= List of Bulgarian films of the 2010s =

A list of the most notable films produced (at least partly) in Bulgaria during the 2010s ordered by year of release. For an alphabetical list of articles on Bulgarian films, see Category:Bulgarian films.

== List ==
=== 2010 ===
Title	English title	Director	Cast	Notes
Хотел Рай	Paradise Hotel	Sophia Tzavella		
Мисия Лондон	Mission London	Dimitar Mitovski	Ralph Brown, Alan Ford	
Лов на дребни хищници	HDSP: Hunting Down Small Predators	Cvetodar Markov		

=== 2011 ===
Title	Title (Latin) English	Director	Length	Cast	Notes
Тилт	Tilt	Viktor Chouchkov			
	Love.net	Ilian Djevelekov			
Kecove	Sneakers	Valeri Yordanov			
Операция „Шменти капели“	Operation Shmenti Capelli	Ivan Mitov			
Лора от сутрин до вечер	Lora from Morning Till Evening	Dimitar Kotzev			
	Avé	Konstantin Bojanov			

=== 2012 ===
Title	Title (Latin) English	Director	Length	Cast	Notes
Sofia's Last Ambulance	Sofia's Last Ambulance	Ilian Metev			

=== 2014 ===
Opening date	Title	Title (Latin) English	Director	Length	Cast and Crew	Studio	Genre	Notes	Ref.
Jan. 06		Kafe Lale - the film	Velizar Borev						
Jan. 17		Rapid Response Corps 2: Nuclear Threat	Stanislav Donchev				Action		
Feb. 14	Живи легенди	Living Legends	Niki Iliev		Niki Iliev		Mystery		
Mar.		Rat poison	Konstantin Burov				Comedy		
Mar. 06	Съдилището	The Judgement	Stephan Komandarev		Assen Blatechki		Drama		
Mar. 09		Immunity	Raymond Steers				Thriller		
Mar. 29		The Savior	Robert Savo				Biography		
Apr. 08	The Expendables 3	The Expendables 3	Patrick Hughes		Sylvester Stallone, Jason Statham, Antonio Banderas, Jet Li, Wesley Snipes, Dolph Lundgren, Kelsey Grammer, Randy Couture, Terry Crews, Kellan Lutz, Ronda Rousey, Glen Powell, Victor Ortiz, Robert Davi, Mel Gibson, Harrison Ford, Arnold Schwarzenegger	Lionsgate	Action		
May 22	Les Ponts de Sarajevo	Bridges of Sarajevo	Aida Begić, Leonardo Di Constanzo, Jean-Luc Godard, Kamen Kalev, Isild Le Besco, Sergei Loznitsa, Vincenzo Marra, Ursula Meier, Vladimir Perišić, Cristi Puiu, Marc Recha, Angela Schanelec, Teresa Villaverde				Documentary		
Jul. 27		Proud Citizen	Thom Southerland						
Aug. 29	Потъването на Созопол	Sinking of Sozopol	Kostadin Bonev	101 minutes	Deyan Donkov, Snezhina Petrova, Svetla Yancheva and Stefan Valdobrev		Drama		
Sep.		Ombre	Zahari Paunov				Drama		
Sep. 04	Урок	The Lesson	Kristina Grozeva, Petar Valchanov	111 minutes	Margita Gosheva, Ivan Barnev, Ivanka Bratoeva, Stefan Denolyubov	Film Movement	Drama	One of three finalists for the European Parliament LUX Film Prize.	
Sep. 20	Autómata	Autómata	Gabe Ibáñez		Antonio Banderas, Birgitte Hjort Sørensen, Dylan McDermott, Robert Forster, Tim McInnerny, Melanie Griffith	Contracorrientes Films	Science fiction, action		
Sep. 30	Sniper: Legacy	Sniper: Legacy	Don Michael Paul		Tom Berenger, Chad Michael Collins, Dominic Mafham, Mercedes Masohn, Doug Allen, Dennis Haysbert	Sony Pictures Home Entertainment	Action		
Sep. 30		Three Days in Sarajevo	Nikolay Todorov				Adventure		
Oct.	Прелюбодеяние	Adultery	Yavor Vesselinov				Drama		
Oct. 19	Киприянови молитви	Cyprian's Prayer	Dobromir Baychev				Drama		
Nov. 21		Soft Bullets	Dimitar Kolev				Action		
Nov. 28	Българ: Филмът	Balgar: The Movie	Nedelcho Bogdanov				Animation		
Dec. 04	Буферна зона	Buferna zona	Georgi Djulgerov				Drama		
Dec. 05	Българска рапсодия	Bulgarian Rhapsody	Ivan Nitchev		Stefan Popov, Kristiyan Makarov, Anjela Nedyalkova	Cinepaz EOOD	Drama		

=== 2015 ===
Title	Title (Latin) English	Director	Length	Cast	Notes
XIa	The 11th Grade	Georgi D. Kostov	84 minutes	Yana Marinova, Nikolai Sotirov, Bashar Rahal, Ralitsa Paskaleva, Boris Kashev, Ioan Lov, Veselin Troyanov, Boyka Velkova, Stanislav Yanevski, Daria Simeonova	
Момичето от НиЗката Земя	The Girl From The Vile Land	Nick Stanchev	100 minutes	Georgi Grozev, Joanna Izabela-Vurbanova, Niki Stanchev and Simeon Vladov	

=== 2016 ===
Title	Title (Latin) English	Director	Length	Cast	Genre(s)	Notes
Слава	Glory	Kristina Grozeva, Petar Valchanov	101 minutes	Stefan Denolyubov, Margita Gosheva	Drama	
Безбог	Godless	Ralitza Petrova	99 minutes	Irena Ivanova, Ivan Nalbantov	Drama	A Bulgarian-Greek coproduction. Hamptons International Film Festival Award for Best Narrative Feature Film
Докато Ая спеше	While Aya Was Sleeping	Cvetodar Markov (also spelled Tsvetodar Markov)	88 minutes	Stefan Denolyubov	Drama	A Bulgarian-Danish-French coproduction. Golden Leopard and various other international awards.
XIa	XIa	Georgi Kostov	83 minutes	Yana Marinova, Bashar Rahal	School Drama	

=== 2017 ===
Title	Title (Latin) English	Director	Length	Cast	Notes
Бензин	Benzin	Asen Blatechki	TBA	Asen Blatechki, Kalin Vratchanski, Sully Erna	Bulgarian "The Fast and the Furious"
	3/4	Ilian Metev			
	Directions				
	Western				
XIIa		Magdalena Ralcheva	93 minutes	Radina Kardzhilova, Maria Kavardzhikova, Aneliya Mangarova, Kal Minev, Deyan Georgiev, Vasilena Atanasova, Maria Bakalova, Darin Angelov, Elena Boycheva	Sequel of The 11th Grade

== See also ==
- Cinema of Bulgaria
- List of Bulgarian submissions for the Academy Award for Best Foreign Language Film
