= Lux Prize =

European film award

LUX Prize
- 2007 logo. The trophy is inspired by-, and the underlying concept of the award is the Tower of Babel.
- Awarded for: Excellence in illustrating the universality of European values and the diversity of European culture
- Country: Countries eligible for the European Commission Media Programme
- Presented by: European Parliament
- First award: 2007
- Final award: 2019
- Website: luxprize.eu

The European Parliament LUX Prize, commonly known as the LUX Prize or LUX Film Prize, was a prize given to a competing film by the European Parliament. Introduced in 2007, the prize is named after the Latin word for "light", lux.

The award was aimed at highlighting films which help to raise awareness of socio-political issues in Europe and to publicise and encourage distribution of European films in the European Union and throughout the world. Open to both fiction (narrative) and documentary films of feature length, entries were limited to films made within Europe and demonstrating European values and/or showcasing European culture. The finalists gained both publicity and enhanced prospects for worldwide distribution through having their films subtitled into the official 24 European languages as part of the award process.

The prize was awarded by the European Parliament and voting was based on voting by Members of the European Parliament. In 2020, it was replaced by the LUX Audience Award, presented alongside the European Film Academy in partnership with the European Commission and Europa Cinemas, with audience voting by the public counting for 50 per cent of the vote.

== History ==
=== Creation and aims ===
The award was created in 2007. The name of the prize originates from the Latin word for "light", lux, with the award named in honour of the Lumière Brothers, who invented cinematography. The word origin is related to the aim of the award, which is to illuminate public debate on European integration and to facilitate the diffusion of European films in the European Union".

The symbol of the LUX Prize is the Tower of Babel, and the trophy reflects the shape of a tower. It is "a symbol of history where linguistic and cultural diversity join forces". It was designed by Belgian artist Jocelyne Coster.

The European Parliament believes that films help to instigate debate and raise awareness of socio-political issues in Europe, especially with regard to European integration, thus helping to forge and celebrate a stronger European identity and values. The prize also helps to publicise and encourage distribution of European films in the European Union and throughout the world, which otherwise may not get widespread distribution owing to language and other barriers.

=== Earlier editions ===
For the first edition of the prize, three films were shortlisted by a 17-member panel, comprising mainly people in the film industry, who viewed 800 feature films produced in Europe in the year from May 2006 to May 2007. The first LUX Prize was awarded to Turkish-born German director Fatih Akin, for his film The Edge of Heaven.

The jury members were appointed by the European Parliament Committee on Culture and Education, and it was planned that a third of the jury would be rotated each year. All members of the European Parliament were able to watch the final three films, but only those who have seen all three qualify for voting rights.

The producers of the ten shortlisted films are required to provide digital copies in the form of DVDs, Vimeo link, or OpenDCP for the members of the European Parliament. In 2015, the shortlisted Son of Saul was disqualified when the production team refused to provide this, fearing that the film copies would be pirated.

In 2019, there were 21 members on the judging panel. The selection of the first 10 films was announced in March of that year, with the final three selected in July and the winner announced in Strasbourg on 27 November.

=== 2020 changes ===
Partly in response to the COVID-19 pandemic in Europe, changes were announced to the name, the selection process and the timetabling of the LUX Award in September 2020. The European Parliament and the European Film Academy would be responsible for the management of the award, in partnership with the European Commission and the Europa Cinemas network. The name was changed to LUX – the European Audience Film Award by the European Parliament and the European Film Academy, with the abbreviated version LUX European Audience Film Award. The new format was announced by Sabine Verheyen, chair of the Culture Committee, at the 77th Venice International Film Festival.

There would henceforth be five nominees competing for the award, which would all be subtitled in 24 European languages, but due to the impact of the pandemic on the film industry, only three would be nominated for the first edition of the new format. The jury would remain similar, but the winner would be selected jointly by MEPs and the public, with each contributing 50 per cent towards the final vote.

== Award process ==
=== Selection criteria ===
As of 2019, films have to meet following eligibility criteria:

- Fiction or documentary films (may be animated)
- Minimum length of 60 minutes
- Produced or co-produced in a European Union country or in Iceland, Norway, Albania, Bosnia and Herzegovina or Montenegro, under the Creative Europe/Media Programme.
- Illustrates the universality of European values and the diversity of European culture, and raise awareness of social or political issues
- Released for the first time between May 1 of the previous year and June 1 of the current year. For the 2021 edition, the release period was expanded, from 1 June 2019 until 12 September 2020, including online releases.

=== Preselection ===
Ten films are shortlisted, and three of these are selected for the final competition. After three (five after 2021) films have been selected from the 10 preselected films, these films are subtitled into the 24 official EU languages, and they are screened in all EU countries during the "LUX Film Days". In the 2020 edition, no preselection was hold, announcing directly the three nominated films.

=== 2020 selection and voting timetable ===
In 2020, the European Film Awards Ceremony was supposed to take place in Reykjavík, Iceland, on 12 December. Due to the COVID-19 Pandemic, the Ceremony took place the scheduled day in a virtual format broadcast and streamed from the European Film Academy site in Berlin, where the three nominated films were announced. The three nominated films were chosen by a selection panel consisting of 21 people.

The nominated films, after subtitling in the 24 official languages, are being screened across Europe until May 2021. Between 10 and 16 May 2021 the "LUX Audience Week" takes place, with simultaneous screenings and debates organised across the continent. The public is able to vote by ranking the nominated films, awarding them one to five stars, and the totals will represent 50 per cent of the vote, with the other 50 per cent going to the MEPs. Voting period closes on 23 May 2021.

The winning film will be announced at the LUX Award Ceremony on 9 June 2021, during a plenary sitting of the European Parliament in Strasbourg, France, as in previous editions. The Parliament President presents the award to the laureate in front of the MEPs and representatives from the other films in competition.

=== 2020 Voting process ===
The audience can cast their votes for all three nominated films from 13 December 2020 until 23 May 2021 on the Lux award website. Audiences will be able to rate each film via this website. Members of the European Parliament will also vote, from March until 23 May 2021 via a dedicated voting page of the institution. Ratings can be changed an unlimited number of times until the voting closes. The last vote counts.

The final ranking will be determined by combining the public vote and the vote by the Members of the European Parliament, with each group weighing 50%.

=== Pre-2020 timetable and process ===
Date	Place	Result	Notes
February		Selection starts	
June–July	Karlovy Vary International Film Festival, Karlovy Vary, the Czech Republic	Launch of the Selection process	Public announcement of the 10-LUX films of the Official Selection
September	Rome, Italy	Selection of the 3 shortlist films	Announcement of the 3 films in the Official Competition
September	Venice Film Festival, Venice, Italy	Special screenings	Venice Days
September–November	LUX Film Days, cities across European Union member states, candidates, European Economic Area, Switzerland	Special screenings	Launched in 2012, the project aims to bring the screenings of the 3 finalists of the award. It is aired mainly in the cinemas that are part of the Europa Cinemas film theatre networks. For most countries, the screenings are also national premieres. Screenings take place also in cooperation with film festivals: • Thessaloniki International Film Festival, • Stockholm International Film Festival, • Tallinn Black Nights Film Festival, • Sevilla Film Festival, • Sofia International Film Festival, • Zagreb Film Festival.
November	internet	final voting	Only Members of the European Parliament, who have seen all three films during the screenings or extra muros, are entitled to vote. Voting takes place electronically via the intranet site at the Parliament. The film which gains the highest number of votes is the winner.
November–December	the Seat of the European Parliament, Strasbourg, France	the formal, official sitting session of parliament, Selection of the winner	LUX Prize Award Ceremony and seminar for journalists

== Winners and nominees ==
Winners are listed first and highlighted in bold.

=== 2000s ===
Year	Result	English title	Original title	Director	Nationality of Director (at time of film's release)	Language	Academy Awards Best Foreign Language Film	European Film Awards Best Film
2007	Winner	**The Edge of Heaven**	**Auf der anderen Seite**	Fatih Akın	Germany	German, Turkish, English	submission	nomination
2007	Top-3 Shortlist	4 Months, 3 Weeks and 2 Days	4 luni, 3 săptămâni şi 2 zile	Cristian Mungiu	Romania	Romanian	submission	won
2007	Top-3 Shortlist	Belle Toujours		Manoel de Oliveira	Portugal	French		
2007	Selection	Das Fräulein		Andrea Štaka	Switzerland	German, Swiss German dialect, Serbo-Croatian		
2007	Selection	Kalinovsky Square	Ploshcha	Jury Chaščavacki	Belarus	Russian, Belarusian, English (subtitles)		
2007	Selection	It Happened Just Before	Kurz davor ist es passiert	Anja Salomonowitz	Austria	German		
2007	Selection	Iska's Journey	Iszka utazása	Csaba Bollók	Hungary	Hungarian, Romanian		
2007	Selection	California Dreamin'	California Dreamin' (nesfârșit)	Cristian Nemescu	Romania	Romanian, English		
2008	Winner	**Lorna's Silence**	**Le Silence de Lorna**	Jean-Pierre Dardenne and Luc Dardenne	Belgium	French, Italian, German		
2008	Top-3 Shortlist	Delta		Kornél Mundruczó	Hungary	Hungarian		
2008	Top-3 Shortlist	Citizen Havel	Občan Havel	Miroslav Janek and Pavel Koutecký	Czech Republic	Czech		
2008	Selection	Revanche		Götz Spielmann	Austria	German, Russian		
2008	Selection	The World Is Big and Salvation Lurks Around the Corner	Светът е голям и спасение дебне отвсякъде	Stephan Komandarev	Bulgaria	Bulgarian, German, Italian, Slovenian		
2008	Selection	Cloud 9	Wolke Neun	Andreas Dresen	Germany	German		
2008	Selection	Tricks	Sztuczki	Andrzej Jakimowski	Poland	Polish		
2008	Selection	Autumn Ball	Sügisball	Veiko Õunpuu	Estonia	Estonian		
2008	Selection	Worlds Apart	To verdener	Niels Arden Oplev	Denmark	Danish		
2008	Selection	The rest of the night	Il Resto della notte	Francesco Munzi	Italy	Italian, Romanian		
2009	Winner	**Welcome**		Philippe Lioret	France	French, English, Kurdish, Turkish		
2009	Top-3 Shortlist	Eastern Plays	Източни пиеси	Kamen Kalev	Bulgaria	Bulgarian		
2009	Top-3 Shortlist	Storm	Sturm	Hans-Christian Schmid	Germany	English, German, Bosnian, Serbian		
2009	Selection	Pandora's Box	Pandora'nın Kutusu	Yeşim Ustaoğlu	Turkey	Turkish		
2009	Selection	35 Shots of Rum	35 Rhums	Claire Denis	France	French, German		
2009	Selection	Ander		Roberto Castón	Spain	Basque, Spanish		
2009	Selection	North	Nord	Rune Denstad Langlo	Norway	Norwegian		
2009	Selection	Katalin Varga		Peter Strickland	United Kingdom	Hungarian, Romanian		
2009	Selection	Lost Persons Area		Caroline Strubbe	Belgium	English, Dutch, Hungarian		
2009	Selection	For a Moment, Freedom	Ein Augenblick Freiheit	Francesco Munzi	Austria	English, Persian, Turkish		

=== 2010s ===
Year	Result	English title	Original title	Director	Nationality of Director (at time of film's release)	Language	Academy Awards Best Foreign Language Film	European Film Awards Best Film
2010	Winner	**When We Leave**	**Die Fremde**	Feo Aladag	Austria	German, Turkish		
2010	Top-3 Shortlist	Akadimia Platonos	Ακαδημία Πλάτωνος	Filippos Tsitos	Greece	Greek, Albanian, German		
2010	Top-3 Shortlist	Illégal		Olivier Masset-Depasse	Belgium	French		
2010	Selection	Medal of Honor	Medalia de onoare	Calin Peter Netzer	Romania	Romanian		
2010	Selection	The Mouth of the Wolf	La bocca del lupo	Pietro Marcello	Italy	Italian		
2010	Selection	Lourdes		Jessica Hausner	Austria	French		
2010	Selection	I Am Love	Io sono l'amore	Luca Guadagnino	Italy	Italian		
2010	Selection	Bibliothèque Pascal		Szabolcs Hajdu	Hungary	Romanian, English, Hungarian		
2010	Selection	R		Tobias Lindholm, Michael Noer	Denmark	Danish, Arabic		
2010	Selection	Eastern Drift	Eurazijos aborigenas	Šarūnas Bartas	Lithuania	French, Lithuanian, Russian		
2011	Winner	**The Snows of Kilimanjaro**	**Les Neiges du Kilimandjaro**	Robert Guédiguian	France	French		
2011	Top-3 Shortlist	Attenberg		Athina Rachel Tsangari	Greece	Greek		
2011	Top-3 Shortlist	Play		Ruben Östlund	Sweden	Swedish		
2011	Selection	Mysteries of Lisbon	Mistérios de Lisboa	Raúl Ruiz	Portugal	Portuguese, French, English		
2011	Selection	Le Havre		Aki Kaurismäki	Finland	French		
2011	Selection	The Turin Horse	A torinói ló	Béla Tarr	Hungary	Hungarian		
2011	Selection	Morgen		Marian Crişan	Romania	Romanian, Hungarian, Turkish		
2011	Selection	Essential Killing		Jerzy Skolimowski	Poland	English, Polish, Arabic		
2011	Selection	We Have a Pope	Habemus Papam	Nanni Moretti	Italy	Italian		
2011	Selection	Pina		Wim Wenders	Germany	German, English, French, Italian, Portuguese, Russian, Slovenian, Korean, Spanish		
2012	Winner	**Shun Li and the Poet**	**Io sono Li**	Andrea Segre	Italy	Italian, Mandarin		
2012	Top-3 Shortlist	Just the Wind	Csak a szél	Benedek Fliegauf	Hungary			
2012	Top-3 Shortlist	Tabu		Miguel Gomes	Portugal			
2012	Selection	Caesar Must Die	Cesare deve morire	Vittorio Taviani, Paolo Taviani	Italy			nomination
2012	Selection	Children of Sarajevo	Djeca	Aida Begić	Bosnia and Herzegovina			
2012	Selection	Barbara		Christian Petzold	Germany		submission	nomination
2012	Selection	Crulic: The Path to Beyond	Crulic - Drumul spre dincolo	Anca Damian	Romania			
2012	Selection	Louise Wimmer		Cyril Mennegun	France			
2012	Selection	Sister	L'Enfant d'en haut	Ursula Meier	France			
2012	Selection	Our Children	À perdre la raison	Joachim Lafosse	Belgium			
2013	Winner	**The Broken Circle Breakdown**		Felix Van Groeningen	Belgium	Dutch	nomination	nomination
2013	Top-3 Shortlist	Miele		Valeria Golino	Italy			
2013	Top-3 Shortlist	The Selfish Giant		Clio Barnard	United Kingdom			
2013	Selection	Fortress	Pevnost	Lukáš Kokeš, Klára Tasovská	Czech Republic			
2013	Selection	A Coffee in Berlin	Oh Boy!	Jan Ole Gerster	Germany			nomination
2013	Selection	The Plague	La Plaga	Neus Ballús	Spain			
2013	Selection	The Great Beauty	La grande bellezza	Paolo Sorrentino	Italy			
2013	Selection	Circles	Кругови	Srdan Golubovic	Serbia			
2013	Selection	In Bloom	გრძელი ნათელი დღეები	Nana Ekvtimishvili, Simon Groß	Georgia Germany			
2013	Selection	Eat Sleep Die	Äta sova dö	Gabriela Pichler	Sweden			
2014	Winner	**Ida**		Paweł Pawlikowski	Poland	Polish, French, Latin	won	won
2014	Top-3 Shortlist	Class Enemy	Razredni sovražnik	Rok Biček	Slovenia			
2014	Top-3 Shortlist	Girlhood	Bande de filles	Céline Sciamma	France			
2014	Selection	White God	Fehér isten	Kornél Mundruczó	Hungary			
2014	Selection	Beautiful Youth	Hermosa juventud	Jaime Rosales	Spain			
2014	Selection	Stations of the Cross	Kreuzweg	Dietrich Brüggemann	Germany			
2014	Selection	The Wonders	Le meraviglie	Alice Rohrwacher	Italy			
2014	Selection	Macondo		Sudabeh Mortezai	Austria			
2014	Selection	Force Majeure	Turist	Ruben Östlund	Sweden			
2014	Selection	Xenia		Panos H. Koutras	Greece			
2015	Winner	**Mustang**		Deniz Gamze Ergüven	Turkey	Turkish	nomination	nomination
2015	Top-3 Shortlist	Mediterranea		Jonas Carpignano	Italy			
2015	Top-3 Shortlist	The Lesson	Урок	Kristina Grozeva and Petar Valchanov	Bulgaria			
2015	Selection	Rams	Hrútar	Grímur Hákonarson	Iceland			
2015	Selection	45 Years		Andrew Haigh	United Kingdom			
2015	Selection	A Perfect Day	Un día perfecto	Fernando León de Aranoa	Spain			
2015	Selection	The Measure of a Man	La Loi du marché	Stéphane Brizé	France			
2015	Selection	Son of Saul	Saul fia	László Nemes	Hungary	German, Hungarian, Polish, Yiddish, Russian, Slovak, Czech, Greek	won	
2015	Selection	Toto and His Sisters	Toto si surorile lui	Alexander Nanau	Romania			
2015	Selection	The High Sun	Zvizdan	Dalibor Matanić	Croatia			
2016	Winner	**Toni Erdmann**		Maren Ade	Germany	German, English, Romanian	won	won
2016	Top-3 Shortlist	As I Open My Eyes	À Peine J'Ouvre Les Yeux	Leyla Bouzid	Tunisia			
2016	Top-3 Shortlist	My Life as a Courgette	Ma Vie de Courgette	Claude Barras	Switzerland			
2016	Selection	A War	Krigen	Tobias Lindholm	Denmark			
2016	Selection	Things to Come	L'Avenir	Mia Hansen-Løve	France			
2016	Selection	Sieranevada		Cristi Puiu	Romania			
2016	Selection	Like Crazy	La pazza gioia	Paolo Virzi	Italy			
2016	Selection	A Syrian Love Story		Sean McAllister	United Kingdom			
2016	Selection	Letters from War	Cartas da Guerra	Ivo Ferreira	Portugal			
2016	Selection	Suntan		Argyris Papadimitropoulos	Greece			
2017	Winner	**Sami Blood**	**Sameblod**	Amanda Kernell	Sweden	Swedish, South Sami		
2017	Top-3 Shortlist	BPM (Beats per Minute)	120 battements par minute	Robin Campillo	France	French		
2017	Top-3 Shortlist	Western		Valeska Grisebach	Germany	German, Bulgarian		
2017	Selection	A Ciambra		Jonas Carpignano	Italy	Italian		
2017	Selection	Glory	Слава	Kristina Grozeva and Petar Valchanov	Bulgaria	Bulgarian		
2017	Selection	Heartstone	Hjartasteinn	Guðmundur Arnar Guðmundsson	Iceland	Icelandic		
2017	Selection	King of the Belgians		Peter Brosens and Jessica Woodworth	Belgium United States	English, Flemish, French, Bulgarian		
2017	Selection	Summer 1993	Estiu 1993	Carla Simón	Spain	Catalan		
2017	Selection	The Last Family	Ostatnia rodzina	Jan P. Matuszynski	Poland	Polish		
2017	Selection	The Other Side of Hope	Toivon tuolla puolen	Aki Kaurismäki	Finland	Finnish, English, Arabic		
2018	Winner	**Woman at War**	**Kona fer í stríð**	Benedikt Erlingsson	Iceland	Icelandic, Spanish, English, Ukrainian	submission	
2018	Top-3 Shortlist	The Other Side of Everything	Druga strana svega	Mila Turajlić	Serbia			
2018	Top-3 Shortlist	Styx		Wolfgang Fischer	Austria			
2018	Selection	Border	Gräns	Ali Abbasi	Denmark	Swedish	submission	nomination
2018	Selection	Girl		Lukas Dhont	Belgium			
2018	Selection	Mug	Twarz	Małgorzata Szumowska	Poland	Polish		
2018	Selection	Utøya: July 22	Utøya 22. juli	Erik Poppe	Norway	Norwegian		
2018	Selection	Donbass	Донбас	Sergei Loznitsa	Ukraine	Russian, Ukrainian	submission	
2018	Selection	Happy as Lazzaro	Lazzaro felice	Alice Rohrwacher	Italy	Italian		nomination
2018	Selection	The Silence of Others	El silencio de otros	Almudena Carracedo and Robert Bahar	Spain United States			
2019	Winner	**God Exists, Her Name Is Petrunija**	Gospod postoi, imeto i' e Petrunija	Teona Strugar Mitevska	North Macedonia	Macedonian		
2019	Top-3 Shortlist	The Realm	El reino	Rodrigo Sorogoyen	Spain	Spanish		
2019	Top-3 Shortlist	Cold Case Hammarskjöld		Mads Brügger	Denmark			
2019	Selection	Clergy	Kler	Wojciech Smarzowski	Poland	Polish		
2019	Selection	Her Job	I douleia tis	Nikos Labôt	France			
2019	Selection	Honeyland		Tamara Kotevska, Ljubomir Stefanov	North Macedonia	Macedonian, Turkish, Bosnian	submission	
2019	Selection	Invisibles	Les invisibles	Louis-Julien Petit	France	French		
2019	Selection	Ray & Liz		Richard Billingham	United Kingdom	English		
2019	Selection	System Crasher	Systemsprenger	Nora Fingscheidt	Germany	German		nomination
2019	Selection	The Man Who Surprised Everyone	Человек, который удивил всех	Natasha Merkulova, Aleksey Chupov	Russia	Russian		

== See also ==
- European Film Academy Lux Award
- European Border Breakers Award
- Film Award of the Council of Europe
- Nordic Council Film Prize
