= List of Bulgarian submissions for the Academy Award for Best International Feature Film =

Best International Feature Film submissions from Bulgaria

Highlights
- Debut: 1971
- Submissions: 37
- Nominations: none
- Oscar winners: none

Bulgaria has submitted films for the Academy Award for Best International Feature Film (Note: The category was previously named the Academy Award for Best Foreign Language Film, but this was changed to the Academy Award for Best International Feature Film in April 2019, after the Academy deemed the word "Foreign" to be outdated.) since 1971. The award is handed out annually by the United States–based Academy of Motion Picture Arts and Sciences to a feature-length motion picture produced outside the U.S. that contains primarily non-English language dialogue. It was not created until the 1956 Academy Awards, in which a competitive Academy Award of Merit was created for non-English speaking films, and has been given annually since.

As of 2026, Bulgaria has submitted thirty-seven films, but none of them were nominated.

== Submissions ==
The Bulgarian films selected for this category generally fall into three categories- those submitted by the Communist People's Republic of Bulgaria (seven films, submitted for the 1972 to 1990 award ceremonies); those made during the Post-Communist transition period where film output was extremely limited (three films, 1991–2000); and films made after the national film industry had recovered. Prior to 2007, the responsibility for selecting the Bulgarian submission went to the Bulgarian National Council on Cinema. From 2007, the Bulgarian submission was chosen by the newly-formed Bulgarian National Film Council.

The World Is Big and Salvation Lurks Around the Corner (2009) advanced to the December shortlists, but it was not nominated.

German filmmaker Valeska Grisebach was the first non-Bulgarian filmmaker selected to the represent the country, for her drama film The Dreamed Adventure (2026), set in Bulgaria.

Most of the films submitted were primarily in Bulgarian, with the exception of Ága (2019), which was in Yakut. Below is a list of the films that have been submitted by Bulgaria for review by the academy for the award by year and the respective Academy Awards ceremony.

Year (Ceremony)	Original title	Film title used in nomination	Language(s)	Director(s)	Result
1971 (44th)	Porcupines Are Born Without Bristles	Таралежите се раждат без бодли	Bulgarian	Dimitar Petrov	Not nominated
1972 (45th)	The Goat Horn	Козият рог	Bulgarian	Metodi Andonov	Not nominated
1974 (47th)	The Last Summer	Последно лято	Bulgarian	Christo Christov	Not nominated
1979 (52nd)	The Barrier	Бариерата	Bulgarian	Christo Christov	Not nominated
1982 (55th)	Khan Asparoukh	Хан Аспарух	Bulgarian	Ludmil Staikov	Not nominated
1988 (61st)	Where Are You Going?	За къде пътувате?	Bulgarian	Rangel Vulchanov	Not nominated
1989 (62nd)	Time of Violence	Време разделно	Bulgarian	Ludmil Staikov	Not nominated
1990 (63rd)	Margarit and Margarita	Маргарит и Маргарита	Bulgarian	Nikolai Volev	Not nominated
1991 (64th)	The Well	Кладенецът	Bulgarian	Docho Bodzhakov	Not nominated
1993 (66th)	Canary Season	Сезонът на канарчетата	Bulgarian	Evgeni Mihailov	Not nominated
2000 (73rd)	Letter to America	Писмо до Америка	Bulgarian, English	Iglika Triffonova	Not nominated
2001 (74th)	Fate as a Rat	Съдбата като плъх	Bulgarian	Ivan Pavlov	Not nominated
2002 (75th)	Warming Up Yesterday's Lunch	Подгряване на вчерашния обед	Bulgarian	Kostadin Bonev	Not nominated
2003 (76th)	Journey to Jerusalem	Пътуване към Йерусалим	Bulgarian	Ivan Nitchev	Not nominated
2004 (77th)	Mila from Mars	Мила от Марс	Bulgarian	Zornitsa Sofia	Not nominated
2005 (78th)	Stolen Eyes	Откраднати очи	Bulgarian, Turkish	Radoslav Spassov	Not nominated
2006 (79th)	Monkeys in Winter	Маймуни през зимата	Bulgarian	Milena Andonova	Not nominated
2007 (80th)	Warden of the Dead	Пазачът на мъртвите	Bulgarian	Ilean Simeonov	Not nominated
2008 (81st)	Zift	Дзифт	Bulgarian	Javor Gardev	Not nominated
2009 (82nd)	The World Is Big and Salvation Lurks Around the Corner	Светът е голям и спасение дебне отвсякъде	Bulgarian	Stephan Komandarev	Made shortlist
2010 (83rd)	Eastern Plays	Източни пиеси	Bulgarian, Turkish, English	Kamen Kalev	Not nominated
2011 (84th)	Tilt	Тилт	Bulgarian	Viktor Chouchkov	Not nominated
2012 (85th)	Sneakers	Кецове	Bulgarian	Valeri Yordanov, Ivan Vladimirov	Not nominated
2013 (86th)	The Colour of the Chameleon	Цветът на Хамелеона	Bulgarian	Emil Hristov	Not nominated
2014 (87th)	Bulgarian Rhapsody	Българска Рапсодия	Bulgarian	Ivan Nitchev	Not nominated
2015 (88th)	The Judgment	Съдилището	Bulgarian	Stephan Komandarev	Not nominated
2016 (89th)	Losers	Каръци	Bulgarian	Ivaylo Hristov	Not nominated
2017 (90th)	Glory	Слава	Bulgarian	Kristina Grozeva and Petar Valchanov	Not nominated
2018 (91st)	Omnipresent	Вездесъщият	Bulgarian	Ilian Djevelekov	Not nominated
2019 (92nd)	Ága	Ага	Yakut	Milko Lazarov	Not nominated
2020 (93rd)	The Father	Бащата	Bulgarian	Kristina Grozeva and Petar Valchanov	Not nominated
2021 (94th)	Fear	Страх	Bulgarian	Ivaylo Hristov	Not nominated
2022 (95th)	In the Heart of the Machine	В сърцето на машината	Bulgarian	Martin Makariev	Not nominated
2023 (96th)	Blaga's Lessons	Уроците на Блага	Bulgarian	Stephan Komandarev	Not nominated
2024 (97th)	Triumph	Триумф	Bulgarian	Kristina Grozeva and Petar Valchanov	Not nominated
2025 (98th)	Tarika	Стадото	Bulgarian	Milko Lazarov	Not nominated
2026 (99th)	The Dreamed Adventure	Das geträumte Abenteuer / Мечтаното Приключение	Bulgarian	Valeska Grisebach	Pending

== Shortlisted Films ==
Since 2014, Bulgaria has occasionally announced a list of finalists or eligible films that varies in number over the years (from 6 to 9 films) before announcing its official Oscar nominee The following films have been shortlisted by the Bulgarian National Film Center:

Year	Film
2014	Alienation · Living Legends · Roseville · The Sixth Day · Viktoria
2016	Adultery · Inches from the Ground · Monkey · Thirst · The Woman of My Life
2017	Benzin · Family Relics · Godless · Holiday Makers · No One · Sex Academy: Men · The Singing Shoes · Voevoda
2022	~~Escape~~ · Fishbone · ~~Mother~~ · Petya of My Petya · Phi 1.618 · Shakespeare Like a Street Dog · SpeculatorS · To Put It Mildly
2025	Don't Close Your Eyes · Gundi: Legend of Love · The Shameless · Wedlock · Wingless

== History ==
=== Communist-era submissions (1971–89) ===
The People's Republic of Bulgaria deemed seven films worthy of Oscar consideration, choosing primarily apolitical films, particularly nationalist dramas showcasing Bulgarian history.

The most famous of these was The Goat Horn, a revenge drama based on a famous Bulgarian folktale and considered one of the greatest Bulgarian films of all time. Set in the 17th century, four bandits rape and kill a woman while her husband is away on work in the presence of her young daughter. The husband then raises his daughter as a boy, specifically to take revenge. “Khan Asparoukh”, is an epic 7th century drama about Bulgaria's greatest Emperor Asparoukh, who fought against the Byzantines and founded the Bulgarian nation. “Time of Violence” is a 17th-century tale about the invasion of a Christian region by the Janissaries - Bulgarian youths kidnapped as children by the Ottoman Turks and raised as Muslims in order to violently convert their home villages. The latter film was selected for the Oscars in the midst of the political turmoil that led to the Communist overthrow.

Three other dramas bordered on the surreal. Two films by Christo Christov were selected in the 1970s: “The Last Summer”, about a rural town whose residents are forced to go elsewhere when a new dam floods the area, and “The Barrier”, a romance between a middle-aged composer and the eccentric (insane?) woman to whom he gives shelter in his home. "Where Do We Go From Here?" is the story of a director cruelly manipulating 26 aspiring actors & actresses trying to win an acting competition.

The first-ever Bulgarian Oscar submission was the children's comedy film “Porcupines Are Born without Bristles”, which was selected in Fall 1971 to compete for the 1972 Oscars.

=== Post-communist transition period (1990–2000) ===
After the fall of Communism and the end of generous state subsidies, Bulgarian film output fell drastically. In 1999, not a single Bulgarian film was released. Those few films that were released took advantage of the new lack of censorship to harshly attack the excesses of the old regime. All three films submitted for consideration to the Oscars in this time period were anti-Communist films. Margarit & Margarita, the story of two rebellious youths who fall in love, was banned shortly before the 1989 Revolution and was released shortly after. The Well tells the story of how Communism was imposed with an iron fist after the end of the Second World War. The Canary Season is about the tragic life story of a woman as retold to her teenage son who wants to know the identity of his real father, in which she recounts her rape and forced marriage at the hands of the regime.

=== Since 2001 ===
Prior to Letter to America, every movie on this list was produced by the respected film studio Boyana Film. Starting with America, films from the new and independent studios began to be chosen for the first time. As the number of internationally recognized Bulgarian films increased, multiple films began to be considered each year. In the 2006–2008 selections, four, five and three semi-finalists were considered respectively.

Since Fall 2000, Bulgaria has never failed to submit a film for consideration in the category. Three out of the ten films were directed by women, including one by Milena Andonova, the daughter of Goat Horn director Melodi Andonov.

Since 2006, nine Foreign Language Film contenders are shortlisted after an initial round of AMPAS screenings. Then a selection of academy members in New York and Los Angeles determine the final five nominees. The World is Big and Salvation Lurks Around the Corner was among the nine films shortlisted in 2009, but it did not make the final five.

In 2022, Mother by Zornitsa Sofia was announced as the submission for the 95th Academy Awards. After asking the Academy of Motion Picture Arts and Sciences to confirm the film's eligibility, it was rejected for having more than 50% of its dialogue in English.

Recent films selected have covered a wide variety of genres, with a special emphasis on stories from the Bulgarian countryside.

- In Letter to America, a man from Sofia is required to visit the ancestral village of his childhood friend in search of a song that will help him recover from an accident suffered in the United States.
- Fate As a Rat is a black comedy about three crass men living in a seaside town in the late 1980s.
- Warming Up Yesterday's Lunch follows a documentary film crew into the forests of Macedonia to track down and interview an elderly woman with a fascinating family history.
- Journey to Jerusalem is about two German-Jewish children escaping the Nazis who end up in Bulgaria during WWII, and the traveling theatrical troupe who tries to help them reach their relatives in Palestine.
- Mila From Mars, arguably the most-awarded film in Bulgaria's recent cinematic history, follows a pregnant teen who escapes to a remote village to give birth to her child.
- Stolen Eyes features an unlikely romance (of sorts) between an ethnic Bulgarian soldier and an ethnic Turkish woman during the Communist regime's assimilation campaign, in which thousands of Turks fled the country.
- Monkeys in Winter is a female-driven film telling the stories of three women living 20 years apart, from the 1960s to the 1980s.
- Warden of the Dead is the story of a telekinetic pre-teen who lives in a cemetery and how he brings together a father and daughter who have never known each other.
- Zift is a black-and-white noir thriller with elements of black comedy, about a man convicted of a murder he didn't commit in 1940s pre-Communist Bulgaria, only to be released in the 1960s during the heyday of Communism.
- The World is Big and Salvation Lurks Around the Corner, the first Bulgarian film to be shortlisted for an Oscar, is a road movie about a Bulgarian grandfather and his amnesiac grandson taking a road trip around the Balkans.
