= CinEast =

Annual film festival in Luxembourg

CinEast (pronounced “Ciné East” [sine i:st]) or the Central and Eastern European Film Festival is an annual non-profit film festival held at various venues around Luxembourg in October.

== Festival ==
The CinEast film festival is dedicated to presenting the current film productions from countries of Central and Eastern Europe, part of what was formerly called the Eastern Bloc. Although focusing on the recent feature films, the festival equally presents the most remarkable documentaries, animated works and short films. Besides film projections, the festival also offers a programme of accompanying events, including concerts, exhibitions, debates and gastronomic accents, as well as support to a charity project. CinEast is organised by the non-profit association CinEast asbl. Since 2010, the festival has also included an official competition.

== History ==
=== 2008–2019 ===
Building on experience gained during Polish Film Days in 2006, the first edition of Central European Film Festival of Luxembourg held in October 2008 presented films from 4 countries (Czech Republic, Hungary, Poland and Slovakia) at the premises of Neumünster Abbey in Luxembourg City.

In 2009, Luxembourg’s Cinémathèque became the second main festival venue and the festival grew in terms of both number of films and spectators.

In 2010, the festival acquired the current name “CinEast” and expanded to numerous new venues, almost doubling in size. Romania became the next featured country and an official competition was introduced.

For the 2011 edition, Bulgaria was added to the countries represented and around 80 projections and many accompanying events were offered, attracting over 7,500 participants.

In 2012, CinEast opened its doors to Baltic countries (Estonia, Latvia, Lithuania) as well as Slovenia, Croatia and Serbia, thus featuring 12 countries in total. The 5th edition of CinEast attracted a total of 7,700 participants. The cinematography of the rest of the ex-Yugoslavia countries has been represented at CinEast since the 6th edition in 2013, which attracted a total of over 9000 people. The 7th edition of CinEast in 2014 presented over 55 feature and 45 short films from 18 countries and attracted 9,800 festival-goers. Ukraine and Moldova were represented for the first time. The 2014 international jury was presided by Sergei Loznitsa, in 2015 by Andrzej Zulawski who had to cancel his visit for health reasons.

Since the 8th edition, the festival has been awarding a Critics Prize, chosen by a press jury. The 2015 edition attracted an audience of 9,500 visitors with more than 50 feature films and 50 short productions.

The 9th edition took place from 6 to 23 October 2016 and presented more than 60 long and 40 short films from 18 countries of the former Eastern Bloc and attracted more than 10,400 visitors to the screenings and events (musical, gastronomical, debates, photography exhibition). The International Festival Jury was presided by actress/director Mirjana Karanović.

The 10th edition of the festival took place from 5 to 22 October 2017 and presented more than 100 films from 19 countries, the selection having been extended by films from Albania this year. This edition attracted a total of over 10,600 participants. The international jury was composed of the film director Anne Fontaine (president of the jury), actor Adrian Titieni, director and producer Bady Minck, producer Philippe Carcassonne and Oliver Baumgarten, the programme director of the Max-Ophüls Preis Festival. The press jury included Pablo Chimienti (Le Quotidien), Valerija Berdi (Radio 100,7) and Matthew Boas (Cineuropa.org). The 11th CinEast (4-21 October 2018) featured the "Identities" thematic cycle as well as a special Focus on Latvia and attracted over 10,400 festival-goers. The international jury was presided over by the Hungarian director Benedek Fliegauf and included actors Arta Dobroshi and Astrid Roos, director Govinda Van Maele and producer/festival organiser Sergej Stanojkovski. The press jury comprised journalists Claude Neu, Charlotte Wensierski and Loïc Millot.

The 12th CinEast (3-20 October 2019) welcomed over 11,200 people, setting a new attendance record, and presented 67 feature and around 50 short films. The edition featured a special Focus on Lithuania and the thematic cycle "Down with Walls". The international jury was led by Jacques Doillon and included Renata Santoro, Marius Olteanu, Sophie Mousel and Adolf El Assal. The press jury was composed of Marc Trappendreher, Cristóbal Soage and France Clarinval.

=== 2020s ===
The 13th "hybrid" edition of CinEast (8-25 October 2020) was adapted to the Covid-19 restrictions, combining 110 screenings in cinemas (limited capacity) and online screenings, with a focus on Hungary and the theme "Planting the Future". This edition attracted a total of over 6,450 participants. The international jury members: Tomasz Wasilewski, Heleen Gerritsen, Jani Thiltges, Zoé Wittock & Boyd van Hoeij. press jury 2020: Yasemin Elçi, António Raúl Reis & Elena Lazic.

The 14th edition of CinEast, also “hybrid”, took place from 7 to 24 October 2021 and was attended by 8,500 people. The central theme of this edition was “Dreams of Escape”, with a focus on Slovenia. Romanian director Radu Jude presided over the international jury, which included Michaela Pavlátová, Nicolas Steil, Larisa Faber, and Céline Masset. The press jury comprised Teresa Vena, Tobias Keßler, and Gabrielle Seil.

In 2021, CinEast introduced the Young Talents Award, presented by the Young Talents Jury; in 2021, its jury members were Alix Andries, Luca Mahnke, Nikola Ozimkiewicz, and Elsa Schweitzer. Every year, the Young Talents Jury is guided by the Luxembourgish director Eric Lamhène. After the Covid-19 pandemic, CinEast kept the hybrid format, proposing a limited number of online screenings (CinEast Online Cinema) in addition to regular screenings in cinemas.

The 15th edition of CinEast took place from 6 to 23 October, 2022 and welcomed 9,850 attendees. Its central theme was “Communities”, with a focus on Czechia. The international jury was led by Macedonian director and scriptwriter Teona Strugar Mitevska and included Luc Schiltz, Erika Hníková, Dawid Nickel, and Marion Guth. The press jury comprised Geoff Thompson, Nora Schloesser, and Valerio Caruso. The Young Talents Jury included Céline Schlesser, Andy-Lee Hoareau, Léa Petitjean, and Kevin Wagner.

The 16th edition of CinEast took place from 5-22 October, 2023 and attracted 10,450 visitors. Its central theme was "Adaptations", with a focus on Ukraine and war refugees. French director Patrice Leconte presided over the international jury, which included Iryna Tsilyk, Andrija Mardešić, Sophie Langevin, and Vincent Quénault. The press jury consisted of Katrin Büchler, Tómas Atli Einarsson, and Isabelle Debuchy. The Young Talents Jury comprised Alyssa Joao, Morgane Verdin-Pol, Ethan Beaufort, and François Sfalcin.

The 17th edition of CinEast (3-20 October 2024) welcomed over 10,550 participants. This edition’s thematic cycle was “United We Stand”, with a special focus dedicated to Croatia. The international jury was presided over by German-Romanian director Alexander Nanau, and included Anna Hints, Szilárd Bernáth, Jacques Molitor, and Hana Sofia Lopes. The press jury consisted of Sevara Pan, Jeff Schinker, and Mike Winter. The Young Talents Jury included Adriano Asola, Antoine Raffaelli, Nadine Van Breda, and Tun Wampach.

The 18th edition of CinEast took place from 10 to 26 October, 2025, and set a new attendance record with 11,500 people. The central theme of this edition was “Disruptions”, with a special focus on Poland. The international jury was led by Bosnian director Danis Tanović, and included Maria Zbąska, Akaki Popkhadze, Sascha Ley, and Adrien Chef. The press jury comprised Olivia Popp, Hendrik Warnke, and Valentin Maniglia. The Young Talents Jury consisted of Nithael Athanasiou, Natalia Dembowska, Viktor Lespagnol, and Louise-Henriane Lestienne.

In 2025, CinEast introduced a 3-day Warm-up Weekend that serves as a prelude to the festival, which is followed by a 2-day break, before the official festival opening, followed by the 11-day main festival block.

The 19th edition of CinEast is scheduled for 9-25 October 2026. This edition will follow the same format as the 2025 one.

== Award winners ==
2025

- Grand Prix – Wind, Talk to Me
- Special Jury Prize – God Will Not Help
- Critics' Prize – Little Trouble Girls
- Young Talents Award – DJ Ahmet
- Audience Award – Fiume o morte!
- Audience Awards for Short Films – Sujip (fiction), Balconada (animated), Confession (documentary)

2024

- Grand Prix – Toxic by Saulė Bliuvaitė
- Special Jury Prize – Windless
- Critics' Prize – Toxic
- Special Mention – Lesson Learned
- Young Talents Award – It's Not My Film
- Audience Award – Waves
- Audience Awards for Short Films – The Man Who Could Not Remain Silent (fiction), Hello Summer (animated), Rising Above (documentary)

2023

- Grand Prix – Citizen Saint
- Special Jury Prize – Blaga's Lessons
- Critics' Prize – Blaga's Lessons
- Special Mention – Smoke Sauna Sisterhood
- Young Talents Award – Larry
- Audience Award – Sisters
- Audience Awards for Best Short Films – Island of Freedom (fiction), Crab (animated), The Silence of the Banana Trees (documentary)

2022

- Grand Prix – Gentle
- Special Jury Prize – 107 Mothers
- Critics' Prize – How Is Katia?
- Young Talents Award – The Uncle
- Audience Award – Sonata
- Audience Award for Best Short Film – Branka (fiction), This Will Not Be a Festival Film (animation), Attention All Passengers (documentary)

2021

- Grand Prix – Murina by Antoneta Alamat Kusijanović
- Special Jury Prize – Never Gonna Snow Again by Małgorzata Szumowska and Michał Englert
- Critics' Prize – Miracle by Bogdan George Apetri
- Young Talents Award – Love Tasting by Dawid Nickel
- Audience Award – Love Around The World by Davor Rostuhar & Andjela Rostuhar
- Audience Award for Best Short Film – Boredom by Alica Bednáriková (fiction), Red Shoes by Anna Podskalská (animation), Stolen Fish by Gosia Juszczak (documentary)

2020

- Grand Prix – Servants by Ivan Ostrochovský
- Special Jury Prize – Mare by Andrea Štaka
- Critics' Prize – Stories from the Chestnut Woods by Gregor Božič
- Audience Award – Collective by Alexander Nanau
- Audience Award for Best Short Film – Lake of Happiness by Aliaksei Paluyan (fiction), Way of Silvie by Verica Pospíšilová Kordić (animation), We Have One Heart by Katarzyna Warzecha (documentary)

2019

- Grand Prix – Oleg by Juris Kursietis
- Special Jury Prize – Corpus Christi by Jan Komasa
- Critics' Prize – Corpus Christi by Jan Komasa
- Audience Award – Honeyland by Ljubomir Stefanov and Tamara Kotevska
- Audience Award for Best Short Film – The Christmas Gift by Bogdan Muresan fiction), Toomas Beneath The Valley Of The Wild Wolves (animation) by Chintis Lundgren, Dancing For You by Katarzyna Lesisz (documentary)

2018

- Grand Prix – One Day by Zsófia Szilágyi
- Special Jury Prize – Winter Flies by Olmo Omerzu
- Critics' Prize – Ága by Milko Lazarov
- Special Mention – Ága by Milko Lazarov
- Audience Award – The Other Side Of Everything by Mila Turajlić
- Audience Award for Best Short Film – A Siege by István Kovács (fiction), Vika by Marta Iwanek and Christian Borys (documentary), The Box by Dušan Kastelic (animation)

2017

- Grand Prix – Birds Are Singing In Kigali by Joanna Kos-Krauze and Krzysztof Krauze
- Special Jury Prize – Soldiers. Story From Ferentari by Ivana Mladenović
- Critics' Prize – Directions by Stephan Komandarev
- Audience Award – The Constitution by Rajko Grlić
- Audience Award for Best Short Film – Into the Blue by Antoneta Alamat Kusijanović (fiction), Close Ties by Zofia Kowalewska (documentary), Gamer Girl by Irena Jukić Pranjić (animation)

2016

- Grand Prix – Mellow Mud (Es Esmu Šeit) by Renars Vimba
- Special Jury Prize – Kills on Wheels by Atila Till
- Critics' Prize – 11 Minutes by Jerzy Skolimowski
- Audience Award – Planet Single by Mitja Okorn
- Audience Award for Best Short Film – Romantik by Mateusz Rakowicz (fiction), Education by Emi Buchwald (documentary), Happy End by Jan Saska (animation)

2015

- Grand Prix – Body by Małgorzata Szumowska
- Special Jury Prize – Babai by Visar Morina
- Critics' Prize – Son of Saul by László Nemes
- Audience Award – Losers by Ivaylo Hristov
- Audience Award for Best Short Film – Shok by Jamie Donoughue (fiction), 2nd floor / 2.em by Hajni Kis (documentary), Nina by Veronika Obertová & Michaela Čopíková (Ové Pictures) (animation)

2014

- Grand Prix – The Way Out by Petr Václav
- Special Jury Prize – Viktoria by Maya Vitkova
- Audience Award – Life Feels Good by Maciej Pieprzyca
- Audience Award for Best Short Film – Little Secret by Martin Krejčí (fiction),

Down On The Corner by Nikola & Corina Schwingruber Ilić (documentary), Baths by Tomasz Ducki (animation)

2013

- Grand Prix – Circles by Srdan Golubovic
- Special Jury Prize – Heavenly Shift by Mark Bodzsar
- Audience Award – Circles by Srdan Golubovic

2012

- Grand Prix – Everybody In Our Family by Radu Jude
- Special Jury Prize – Tilva Rosh by Nikola Ležaić
- Audience Award – Mushrooming by Toomas Hussar
- Audience Award for best short feature – Frozen Stories by Grzegorz Jaroszuk

2011

- Grand Prix – The Mill and the Cross by Lech Majewski
- Special Jury Prize – Adrienn Pál by Ágnes Kocsis
- Audience Award – Czech Made Man by Tomáš Řehořek

2010

- Grand Prix – Morgen by Marian Crişan
- Audience Award – Morgen by Marian Crişan
