= Triumph (2024 film) =

2024 film by Kristina Grozeva and Petar Valchanov

- Promotional release poster
- Directed by: Kristina Grozeva; Petar Valchanov
- Written by: Kristina Grozeva; Decho Taralezhkov; Petar Valchanov
- Produced by: Kristina Grozeva; Petar Valchanov; Maria Bakalova; Julian Kostov
- Starring: Maria Bakalova; Julian Kostov; Julian Vergov; Margita Gosheva
- Cinematography: Krum Rodriguez
- Edited by: Yorgos Mavropsaridis
- Music by: Thodoris Oikonomou
- Production companies: Five Oceans; Abraxas Film; Graal Films
- Release dates: 8 September 2024 (TIFF); 21 March 2025 (Bulgaria)
- Countries: Bulgaria; Greece
- Language: Bulgarian
- Budget: €545,000

Triumph (Bulgarian: Триумф) is a 2024 Bulgarian-Greek black comedy film directed by Kristina Grozeva and Petar Valchanov. The third and final installment of a trilogy of films by the directors, after The Lesson (2014) and Glory (2016), it stars Maria Bakalova, Julian Kostov, Julian Vergov, and Margita Gosheva.

The film premiered at the 2024 Toronto International Film Festival, and was selected as the Bulgarian entry for the Academy Award for Best International Feature Film at the 97th Academy Awards, but was not nominated. It was commercially released in Bulgaria on 21 March 2025.

== Premise ==
In the chaotic aftermath of the fall of communism in the 1990s, a task force composed of high-ranking Bulgarian army officers and psychics embarks on a top-secret military operation in the small village of Tsarichina to dig up an elusive alien artefact that would change the course of history and make Bulgaria great again.

== Cast ==
- Maria Bakalova as Slava Platnikova
- Julian Kostov as Private Georgi
- Julian Vergov as Colonel Platnikov
- Margita Gosheva as Pirina Nyagolova
- Stanislav Ganchev as Major Chernev
- Ivan Savov as General Zlatev
- Ivan Barnev as Minister of Defense

== Production ==
The film received first development support from the Bulgarian National Film Center in 2018. In 2019, Kristina Grozeva and Petar Valchanov announced that Triumph was still in development, with filming expected to begin in late 2020 or 2021. In August 2022, Deadline Hollywood reported that Maria Bakalova and Julian Kostov would co-produce the film and lead the cast.

It is the third and last of Grozeva and Valchanov's "newspaper clippings" trilogy of films based on articles published in the local press, after The Lesson (2014) and Glory (2016).

The film is a co-production between Five Oceans, Abraxas Film, and the Greek production company Graal Films, and was funded by the Bulgarian National Film Center, the Greek Film Centre, Eurimages, MEDIA, the Bulgarian National Television, and ERT. Its budget was €545,000, and filming took place in Bulgaria in 2022 and 2023.

== Release ==
The film premiered in the Platform Prize program at the 2024 Toronto International Film Festival on 8 September 2024.

It was commercially released on 21 March 2025, in Bulgarian cinemas.

== Accolades ==
Triumph was selected as the Bulgarian entry for the Academy Award for Best International Feature Film at the 97th Academy Awards. It was chosen by a unanimous decision of the five-member selection committee appointed by the Bulgarian National Film Center.

=== Awards and nominations ===
Award	Date	Category	Recipient	Result	Ref.
Toronto International Film Festival	15 September 2024	Platform Prize	Kristina Grozeva, Petar Valchanov	Nominated	

== See also ==
- List of submissions to the 97th Academy Awards for Best International Feature Film
- List of Bulgarian submissions for the Academy Award for Best International Feature Film
