= Ivan Barnev =

Bulgarian actor (born 1973)

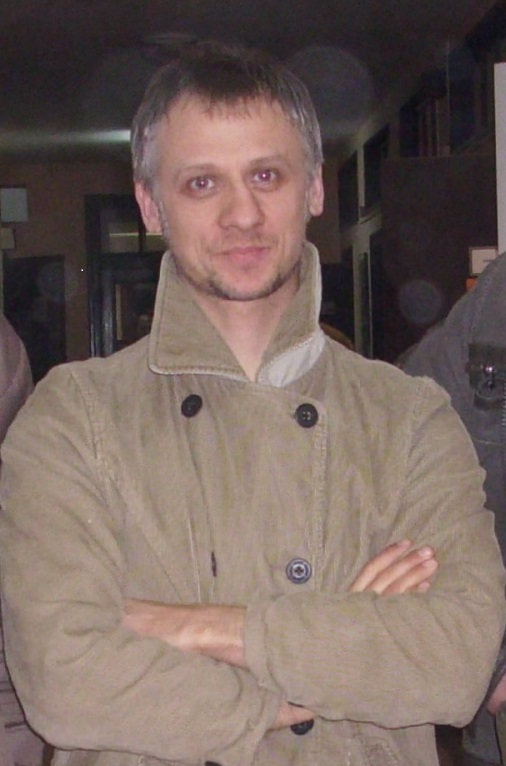
- Barnev in 2009
- Born: July 15, 1973 (age 52); Dobrich, Bulgaria
- Occupation: Actor
- Years active: 1998–present

Ivan Georgiev Barnev (Bulgarian: Иван Георгиев Бърнев; born 15 July 1973) is a Bulgarian actor. He is best known for his performance as Jan Dítě in I Served the King of England (2006), as well as his frequent collaborations with filmmakers Kristina Grozeva and Petar Valchanov in films such as The Lesson (2014), The Father (2019) and Triumph.

== Career ==
Barnev was born in 1973 in Dobrich, and grew up in Varna. He studied at the National Academy for Theatre and Film Arts, initially majoring in drama, before moving to Stefan Danailov's pantomime class and graduating in 1996.

Barnev began his career in theater, and won an Askeer Award for Rising Star for his performance in Dinner of Fools in 2002. In 2011, he won an Askeer Award for Best Actor for his role as Billy Bibbit in One Flew Over the Cuckoo's Nest.

On screen, Barnev has starred in the historical comedy I Served the King of England (2006), the adventure film Sneakers (2011), and the drama films Footsteps in the Sand (2010), The Lesson (2014), Directions (2017) and The Father (2019).

In 2022, Barnev starred in the Spanish-Bulgarian comedy-drama film Vasil, for which he received the award for Best Actor at the Valladolid International Film Festival together with his screen partner Karra Elejalde.

== Acting credits ==
=== Film ===
Year	Title	Role	Notes	Ref.
2006	I Served the King of England	Young Jan Dítě		
2010	Footsteps in the Sand	Slavi		
2011	Sneakers	Ivo		
2014	The Lesson	Mladen		
2017	Directions	Vlado		
2019	The Father	Pavel		
2022	Vasil	Vasil		
2023	Blaga's Lessons			
2024	Because I Love Bad Weather	Radio Host		
2024	Triumph	Minister of Defense		
2026	Black Money for White Nights	Kosyo		

=== Stage ===
- Dinner of Fools (2001)
- One Flew Over the Cuckoo's Nest (2011)
