= Because I Love Bad Weather =

- Theatrical release poster
- Directed by: Yana Lekarska
- Written by: Yana Lekarska
- Produced by: Alexander Kalinov; Bogomil Kalinov; Kalin Kalinov
- Starring: Neda Spasova; Vladimir Mihaylov
- Cinematography: Mladen Minev
- Edited by: Donka Ivanova
- Music by: Boris Karadimtchev
- Production company: Invictus
- Release dates: March 16, 2024 (SIFF); April 5, 2024 (Bulgaria)
- Running time: 100 minutes
- Country: Bulgaria
- Language: Bulgarian

Because I Love Bad Weather (Bulgarian: Защото обичам лошото време) is a 2024 Bulgarian romantic comedy-drama film written and directed by Yana Lekarska in her directorial debut. Starring Neda Spasova and Vladimir Mihaylov accompanied by Boryana Puncheva, Eleni Dekidis, Ivan Barnev and Veselin Rankov.

== Synopsis ==
Irina is a young woman trapped in her own life who longs to be truly happy. She searches for her lost joy and forgotten dreams, she meets again with Boris, an old friend she hasn't seen since her childhood.

== Cast ==
- Neda Spasova as Irina
- Vladimir Mihaylov as Boris
- Boryana Puncheva as Miss Temenuga
- Eleni Dekidis as Maria
- Ivan Barnev as Radio Host
- Veselin Rankov as Dimo

== Production ==
Principal photography began on May 27, 2023, and ended on June 16, 2023, in Varvara, Ahtopol and Sinemorets, Bulgaria.

== Release ==
It had its premiere on March 16, 2024, at the 28th Sofia International Film Festival, then was commercially released on April 5, 2024, in Bulgarian theaters.

== Accolades ==
Year	Award / Festival	Category	Recipient	Result	Ref.
2024	28th Sofia International Film Festival	Grand Prix	Because I Love Bad Weather	Nominated	
2024	28th Sofia International Film Festival	Audience Award	Because I Love Bad Weather	Won	
2024	Vasil Gendov Awards	Best Feature Film	Because I Love Bad Weather	Nominated	
2024	Vasil Gendov Awards	Best Actress	Neda Spasova	Nominated	
2024	Vasil Gendov Awards	Best Actor	Vladimir Mihaylov	Nominated	
2024	Vasil Gendov Awards	Best Screenplay	Yana Lekarska	Nominated	
2024	Vasil Gendov Awards	Best Debut Film	Because I Love Bad Weather	Nominated	
