= 57th Karlovy Vary International Film Festival =

Film festival

- Opening film: Firebrand by Karim Aïnouz
- Closing film: Champions by Bobby Farrelly
- Location: Karlovy Vary, Czech Republic
- Founded: 1946
- Awards: Crystal Globe: Blaga's Lessons by Stephan Komandarev
- No. of films: 170
- Festival date: 30 June–July 8, 2023
- Website: www.kviff.com/en/homepage

KVIFF chronology
- 58th 56th

The 57th Karlovy Vary International Film Festival took place from 30 June to July 8, 2023, in Karlovy Vary, Czech Republic.

== Juries ==
The following were appointed as the juries at the 57th edition:

Crystal Globe Jury

- Patricia Clarkson
- Dora Bouchoucha
- Olmo Omerzu
- John Nein
- Barry Ward

Proxima Jury

- Dana Linssen
- Marija Razgutė
- Šimon Šafránek
- Barbara Wurm
- Meng Xie

The Ecumenical Jury

- Hana Ducho
- Anna Grebe
- Hermann Kocher

Europa Cinemas Label Jury

- Anna-Lena Arreborn
- Ilona van Heeckeren
- Jörg Jacob

== Official selection ==
=== Crystal Globe ===
English title	Original title	Director(s)	Production countrie(s)
Blaga's Lessons	Уроците на Блага	Stefan Komanderev	Bulgaria, Germany
Citizen Saint	მოქალაქე წმინდანი	Tinatin Kajrishvili	Georgia, France, Bulgaria
Dancing on the Edge of a Volcano		Cyril Aris	Germany, Lebanon
Empty Nets	تورهای خالی	Behrooz Karamizade	Germany, Iran
Fremont		Babak Jalali	United States
The Girls Are Alright	Las chicas están bien	Itsaso Arana	Spain
The Hypnosis	Hypnosen	Ernst De Geer	Sweden, Norway, France
Red Rooms	Les Chambres rouges	Pascal Plante	Canada
A Sensitive Person	Citlivý člověk	Tomáš Klein	Czechia, Slovakia
We Have Never Been Modern	Úsvit	Matěj Chlupáček	Czechia, Slovakia
Where the Wind Blows	Il vento soffia dove vuole	Marco Righi	Italy

=== PROXIMA ===
English title	Original title	Director(s)	Production countrie(s)
Arsenie, An Amazing Afterlife	Viața de apoi	Alexandru Solomon	Romania, Luxembourg
Birth		Ji-young Yoo	South Korea
Brutal Heat	Brutální vedro	Albert Hospodářský	Czechia, Slovakia
Dark Matter	Maade tarik	Karim Lakzadeh	Iran
Embryo Larva Butterfly		Kyros Papavassiliou	Cyprus, Greece
Guras		Saurav Rai	India, Nepal
Imago		Olga Chajdas	Poland, Netherlands, Czechia
In Camera		Naqqash Khalid	United Kingdom
Keeping Mum	Maman déchire	Émilie Brisavoine	France
The Lost Children	Les enfants perdus	Michèle Jacob	Belgium
Say God Bye		Thomas Imbach	Switzerland
The Song of the Auricanturi	El canto del Auricanturi	Camila Rodríguez Triana	Colombia, Venezuela

=== Special Screenings ===
English title	Original title	Director(s)	Production countrie(s)
All Men Become Brothers	Všetci ľudia budú bratia	Robert Kirchhoff	Slovakia, Czechia
Facing Darkness		Jean-Gabriel Périot	France, Switzerland, Bosnia and Herzegovina
Restore Point	Bod obnovy	Robert Hloz	Czechia, Slovakia, Poland, Serbia
Scream of My Blood: A Gogol Bordello Story		Nate Pommer, Eric Weinrib	United States
She Came at Night	Přišla v noci	Jan Vejnar, Tomáš Pavlíček	Czechia
Slow		Marija Kavtaradze	Lithuania, Spain, Sweden
Smiling Georgia	Gimiliani Sakartvelo	Luka Beradze	Georgia, Germany
Snake Gas	Hadí plyn	David Jařab	Czechia, Slovakia, Romania
Temporaries	Richelieu	Pier-Philippe Chevigny	Canada

=== Horizons ===
English title	Original title	Director(s)	Production countrie(s)
About Dry Grasses	Kuru otlar üstüne	Nuri Bilge Ceylan	Turkey, France, Germany, Sweden
The Adults		Dustin Guy Defa	United States
Anatomy of a Fall	Anatomie d'une chute	Justine Triet	France
And the King Said, What a Fantastic Machine		Axel Danielson, Maximilien Van Aertryck	Sweden, Denmark
Animalia	Parmi nous	Sofia Alaoui	France, Morocco, Qatar
The Animal Kingdom	Le règne animal	Thomas Cailley	France, Belgium
Autobiography		Makbul Mubarak	Indonesia, France, Singapore, Poland, Philippines, Germany, Qatar
Blackbird Blackbird Blackberry		Elene Naveriani	Switzerland, Georgia
Club Zero		Jessica Hausner	Austria, United Kingdom, Germany, France, Denmark
Dead Girls Dancing		Anna Roller	Germany, France
The Delinquents	Los delincuentes	Rodrigo Moreno	Argentina, Brazil, Luxembourg, Chile
The Edge of the Blade	Une affaire d'honneur	Vincent Perez	France
The Echo	El eco	Tatiana Huezo	Mexico, Germany
Endless Borders	Marzhaye bi payan	Abbas Amini	Germany, Czech Republic, Iran
Fallen Leaves	Kuolleet lehdet	Aki Kaurismäki	Finland, Germany
Fireworks	Stranizza d'amuri	Giuseppe Fiorello	Italy
Goodbye Julia	Wadaan Julia	Mohamed Kordofani	Sudan, Egypt, Germany, France, Saudi Arabia, Sweden
Champions		Bobby Farrelly	United States
If Only I Could Hibernate	Baavgai bolohson	Zoljargal Purevdash	Mongolia, France, Switzerland, Qatar
Inshallah a Boy	Inshallah walad	Amjad Al Rasheed	Jordan, France, Saudi Arabia, Qatar
Inside the Yellow Cocoon Shell	Bên trong vỏ kén vàng	Thien An Pham	Singapore, Vietnam, France, Spain
Iron Butterflies		Roman Liubyi	Ukraine, Germany
Kidnapped	Rapito	Marco Bellocchio	Italy, France, Germany
La chimera		Alice Rohrwacher	Italy, France, Switzerland
Limbo		Ivan Sen	Australia
Luxembourg, Luxembourg	Lyuksemburh, Lyuksemburh	Antonio Lukich	Ukraine
Mami Wata		C.J. Obasi	Nigeria, France, United Kingdom
The March on Rome	Marcia su Roma	Mark Cousins	Italy
Midwives	Sages-femmes	Léa Fehner	France
Monica		Andrea Pallaoro	United States, Italy
Monster	Kaibutsu	Hirokazu Koreeda	Japan
The Mother of All Lies	Kadib abyad	Asmae El Moudir	Morocco, Egypt, Saudi Arabia, Qatar
Mountain Woman	Yama onna	Takeshi Fukunaga	Japan, United States
My Worst Enemy	Mon pire ennemi	Mehran Tamadon	France, Switzerland
The Nature of Love	Simple comme Sylvain	Monia Chokri	Canada, France
No Bears	Khers nist	Jafar Panahi	Iran
Omen	Augure	Baloji Tshiani	Belgium, Netherlands, Democratic Republic of the Congo, France, South Africa
On the Adamant	Sur l'Adamant	Nicolas Philibert	France, Japan
Opponent	Motståndaren	Milad Alami	Sweden
Orlando, My Political Biography	Orlando, ma biographie politique	Paul B. Preciado	France
Passages		Ira Sachs	France
Past Lives		Celine Song	United States, South Korea
Perfect Days		Wim Wenders	Japan, Germany
Perpetrator		Jennifer Reeder	United States
Pornomelancholía		Manuel Abramovich	Argentina, Brazil, France
The Pot-au-Feu	La passion de Dodin Bouffant	Tran Anh Hung	France
Pure Unknown	Sconosciuti puri	Valentina Cicogna, Mattia Colombo	Italy, Sweden, Switzerland
The Quiet Migration	Stille liv	Malene Choi	Denmark
Samsara		Lois Patiño	Spain
Sorcery	Brujería	Christopher Murray	Chile, Mexico, Germany
The Survival of Kindness		Rolf de Heer	Australia
Suzume		Makoto Shinkai	Japan
The Sweet East		Sean Price Williams	United States
A Thousand and One		A. V. Rockwell	United States
Tótem		Lila Avilés	Mexico, Denmark, France
To the North	Spre nord	Mihai Mincan	Romania, France, Greece, Bulgaria, Czech Republic
Umberto Eco – A Library of the World	Umberto Eco – La biblioteca del mondo	Davide Ferrario	Italy
When It Melts	Het smelt	Veerle Baetens	Belgium, Netherlands
When the Waves Are Gone	Kapag wala na ang mga alon	Lav Diaz	Philippines, France, Denmark, Portugal
White Plastic Sky	Műanyag égbolt	Tibor Bánóczki, Sarolta Szabó	Hungary, Slovak Republic

== Awards ==
The following awards were presented:

=== Official selection awards ===
- Grand Prix – Crystal Globe: Blaga's Lessons (Urotcite na Blaga) — Stephan Komandarev
- Special Jury Prize: Empty Nets (Toorhaye khali) — Behrooz Karamizade
- Special Jury Mention: Dancing on the Edge of a Volcano — Cyril Aris
- Best Director: Babak Jalali, Fremont
- Best Actress: Eli Skorcheva, Blaga's Lessons (Urotcite na Blaga)
- Best Actor: Herbert Nordrum, The Hypnosis (Hypnosen)

=== Other statutory awards ===
- PROXIMA Grand Prix: Birth — Yoo Ji-young
- PROXIMA Special Jury Prize: Guras — Saurav Rai
- PROXIMA Special Jury Mention: Brutal Heat (Brutální vedro) — Albert Hospodářský
- Právo Audience Award: The Edge of the Blade (Une affaire d’honneur) — Vincent Perez
- Crystal Globe for Outstanding Artistic Contribution to World Cinema: Russell Crowe
- Festival President's Award: Alicia Vikander, Robin Wright, Ewan McGregor
- Festival President's Award for Contribution to Czech Cinematography: Daniela Kolářová

=== Non-statutory awards ===
- The Ecumenical Jury Award: Blaga's Lessons (Urotcite na Blaga) — Stephan Komandarev
- Commendation of the Ecumenical Jury: Citizen Saint (Mokalake Tsmindani) — Tinatin Kajrishvili
- Europa Cinemas Label Award: The Hypnosis (Hypnosen) — Ernst De Geer
- FIPRESCI Award for Crystal Globe Competition: The Hypnosis (Hypnosen) — Ernst De Geer
- FIPRESCI Award for PROXIMA Competition: Imago — Olga Chajdas
