= 69th Locarno Film Festival =

Film festival in Locarno, Switzerland

- Festival official poster
- Opening film: The Girl With All the Gifts
- Closing film: Mohenjo Daro
- Location: Locarno, Switzerland
- Founded: 1946
- Awards: Golden Leopard: Godless
- Hosted by: Associazione Festival del film Locarno
- Festival date: Opening: 3 August 2016; Closing: 14 August 2016
- Website: Locarno Film Festival

Locarno Film Festival
- 70th 68th

The 69th Locarno Film Festival was held 3 to 13 August 2016 in Locarno, Switzerland. Carlo Chatrian was the festival's Artistic Director.

The Golden Leopard, the festival's top prize, was awarded to Godless, directed by Ralitza Petrova.

The primary Selection Committee included Mark Peranson (Head of Programming), Lorenzo Esposito, Sergio Fant, and Aurélie Godet. The Leopards of Tomorrow section was programmed by Alessandro Marcionni (Head), Gonzalo De Pedro Amatria, Liz Harkman, and Bruno Quiblier. The Retrospective program was curated by Olaf Möller and Roberto Turigliatto.

== Official Jury ==
Headed by Mexican filmmaker Arturo Ripstein, the official selection jury also featured Iranian filmmaker Rafi Pitts, French actress Kate Moran, Brazilian producer Rodrigo Teixeira, and Chinese documentary filmmaker Wang Bing.

== Official Section ==
=== Piazza Grande ===
The following films were selected for the Piazza Grande section:

English title	Original title	Director(s)	Production country
Ceasefire	Cessez-le-feu	Emmanuel Courcol	France
The Day the Rains Came (1959)	Am Tag als der Regen kam	Gerd Oswald	West Germany
Endless Poetry	Poesía sin fin	Alejandro Jodorowsky	France, Chile
The Girl With All the Gifts		Colm McCarthy	United Kingdom, United States
Heaven Will Wait	Le ciel attendra	Marie-Castille Mention-Schaar	France
I, Daniel Blake		Ken Loach	United Kingdom, France, Belgium
Interchange		Dain Iskandar Said	Malaysia, Indonesia
Into the Forest	Dans la forêt	Gilles Marchand	France, Sweden
Jason Bourne		Paul Greengrass	United States
Mohenjo Daro		Ashutosh Gowariker	India
Moka		Frédéric Mermoud	France, Switzerland
Paula		Christian Schwochow	Germany, France
Stefan Zweig: Farewell to Europe	Vor der Morgenröte - Stefan Zweig in Amerika	Maria Schrader	Germany, France, Austria
The Train of Salt and Sugar	Comboio de Sal e Açucar	Licínio Azevedo	Portugal, Mozambique, France, South Africa, Brazil
The Tunnel	터널	Kim Seong-hun	South Korea
Vincent		Christophe Van Rompaey	France, Belgium

=== International Competition (Concorso internazionale) ===
The following films were selected for the Concorso internazionale section:

English title	Original title	Director(s)	Production country
The Apple of My Eye	La prunelle de mes yeux	Axelle Ropert	France
Brooks, Meadows and Lovely Faces	الماء والخضرة والوجه الحسن	Yousry Nasrallah	Egypt
Bangkok Nites		Katsuya Tomita	Japan, France, Thailand, Laos
Correspondências		Rita Azevedo Gomes	Portugal
By the Time It Gets Dark	ดาวคะนอง	Anocha Suwichakornpong	Thailand, Netherlands, France, Qatar
The Dreamed Path	Der traumhafte Weg	Angela Schanelec	Germany
Glory	Slava	Kristina Grozeva, Petar Valchanov	Bulgaria, Greece
Godless	Безбог	Ralitza Petrova	Bulgaria, Denmark, France
Hermia & Helena		Matías Piñeiro	United States, Argentina
The Idea of a Lake	La idea de un lago	Milagros Mumenthaler	Switzerland, Argentina, Qatar
The Last Family	Ostatnia rodzina	Jan P. Matuszyński	Poland
Marija		Michael Koch	Germany, Switzerland
Mister Universo		Tizza Covi, Rainer Frimmel	Austria, Italy
The Ornithologist	O Ornitólogo	João Pedro Rodrigues	Portugal, France, Brazil
Scarred Hearts	Inimi cicatrizate	Radu Jude	Romania, Germany
The Young One	Jeunesse	Julien Samani	France, Portugal
Wet Woman in the Wind	風に濡れた女	Akihiko Shiota	Japan

=== Filmmakers of the Present (Concorso Cineasti del presente) ===
Filmmakers of the Present is the festival's competition for first or second feature films.

English title	Original title	Director(s)	Production country
Afterlov		Stergios Paschos	Greece
Withered Green	Akhdar yabes	Mohammed Hammad	Egypt
Destruction Babies	Disutorakushon beibîzu	Tetsuya Mariko	Japan
Donald Cried		Kris Avedisian	United States
The Human Surge	El auge del humano	Eduardo Williams	Argentina, Brazil, Portugal
The Future Perfect	El futuro perfecto	Nele Wohlatz	Argentina
Still Life	Gorge coeur ventre	Maud Alpi	France
I Had Nowhere to Go		Douglas Gordon	Germany
The Nest	Il nido	Klaudia Reynicke	Switzerland, Italy
Solo, Solitude	Istirahatlah kata-kata	Yosep Anggi Noen	Indonesia
Daydreams	L'indomptée	Caroline Deruas	France
This Time Tomorrow	Mañana a esta hora	Lina Rodríguez	Colombia, Canada
Pescatori di corpi		Michele Pennetta	Switzerland
The Challenge		Yuri Ancarani	Italy, France, Switzerland
Dark Skull	Viejo Calavera	Kiro Russo	Bolivia, Qatar

=== Leopards of Tomorrow (Pardi di domani) ===
Leopards of Tomorrow is the festival's competitive program for short films, with separate international and Swiss sections.

==== International Competition (Concorso internazionale) ====
English title	Original title	Director(s)	Production country
A liña política		Santos Díaz	Spain
À Noite Fazem-se Amigos		Rita Barbosa	Portugal
Fox	Alepou	Jacqueline Lentzou	Greece
An Aviation Field		Joana Pimenta	United States, Portugal, Brazil
Old Luxurious Flat Located in an Ultra-central, Desirable Neighborhood	Apartament interbelic, în zona superbă, ultra-centrală	Sebastian Mihăilescu	Romania
Au loin, Baltimore		Lola Quivoron	France
Cilaos		Camilo Restrepo	France
Clan		Stefanie Kolk	Netherlands
Deep Blue		Joe Nankin	United States
Till the End of the Day	Dgis bolomde	Anna Sarukhanova	Georgia
Each To Their Own		Maria Ines Manchego	New Zealand
Estilhaços		José Miguel Ribeiro	Portugal
Etage X		Francy Fabritz	Germany
Hold Me (Ca Caw Ca Caw)		Renee Zhan	United States
The Committee	Kommittén	Gunhild Enger, Jenni Toivoniemi	Sweden, Norway, Finland
L'immense retour (Romance)		Manon Coubia	Belgium, France
Las vísceras		Elena López Riera	Spain, France
Manodopera		Loukianos Moshonas	France, Greece
Non Castus		Andrea Castillo	Chile
Our Friend the Moon	Nuestra amiga la luna	Velasco Broca	Spain
On The Ropes		Manon Nammour	Lebanon
Long Live the Emperor	Que vive l'Empereur	Aude Léa Rapin	France
Rhapsody		Constance Meyer	France
Setembro		Leonor Noivo	Portugal, Bulgaria
Among the Black Waves	Sredi cheornyh voln	Anna Budanova	Russia
Transition	Tranzicija	Milica Tomovic	Serbia
Umpire		Leonardo Van Dijl	Belgium
Valparaiso		Carlo Sironi	Italy

==== Swiss Competition (Concorso nazionale) ====
English title	Original title	Director(s)	Production country
Cabane		Simon Guélat	France
Côté cour		Lora Mure-Ravaud	Switzerland
The Bridge Over the River	Die Brücke über den Fluss	Jadwiga Kowalska	Switzerland
Digital Immigrants		Norbert Kottmann, Dennis Stauffer	Switzerland
Dormiente		Tommaso Donati	Switzerland
Genesis		Lucien Monot	Switzerland
Iceberg		Mathieu Z’Graggen	France
La femme et le TGV		Timo von Gunten	Switzerland
La Leçon		Tristan Aymon	Switzerland
La sève		Manon Goupil	Switzerland
Les dauphines		Juliette Klinke	Belgium
Lost Exile		Fisnik Maxhuni	Switzerland

=== Signs of Life ===
English title	Original title	Director(s)	Production country
300 Miles		Orwa Al Mokdad	Syria, Lebanon
People That Are Not Me	Anashim shehem lo ani	Hadas Ben Aroya	Israel
Ascent		Fiona Tan	Netherlands, Japan
Beduino		Júlio Bressane	Brazil
Pow Wow		Robinson Devor	United States
All the Cities of the North	Svi severni gradovi	Dane Komljen	Serbia, Bosnia-Herzegovina, Montenegro
Rat Film		Theo Anthony	United States
The Sun, the Sun Blinded Me		Anka Sasnal, Wilhelm Sasnal	Poland, Switzerland

=== Out of Competition (Fuori concorso) ===
==== Feature-length ====
English title	Original title	Director(s)	Production country
Jean Ziegler, the Optimism of Willpower	Jean Ziegler, l'optimisme de la volonté	Nicolas Wadimoff	Switzerland
L'amatore		Maria Mauti	Italy
The Nature of Things	La natura delle cose	Laura Viezzoli	Italy
False Confessions	Les fausses confidences	Luc Bondy	France
Cinema, Manoel de Oliveira and Me	O Cinema, Manoel de Oliveira e Eu	João Botelho	Portugal
Peter Handke: In the Woods, Might Be Late	Peter Handke: Bin im Wald. Kann sein, dass ich mich verspäte...	Corinna Belz	Germany
Journey of Hope [1991]	Reise der Hoffnung	Xavier Koller	Switzerland, Italy, Germany
A Jew Must Die	Un Juif pour l'example	Jacob Berger	Switzerland
A Young Girl In Her Nineties	Une jeune fille de 90 ans	Valeria Bruni Tedeschi, Yann Coridian	France
Zaineb Hates the Snow	Zaineb takrahou ethelj	Kaouther Ben Hania	Tunisia, France, Qatar, Lebanon, United Arab Emirates
Where Is Rocky II? [Art Basel selection]		Pierre Bismuth	France, Germany, Belgium, Italy

==== Shorts ====
English title	Director(s)	Production country
A Brief History of Princess X	Gabriel Abrantes	Portugal, France, United Kingdom
A Train Arrives at the Station	Thom Andersen	United States
Animals Under Anaesthesia: Speculations on the Dreamlife of Beasts	Melanie Shatzky, Brian M. Cassidy	Canada
Festa	Franco Piavoli	Italy
Indefinite Pitch	James N. Kienitz Wilkins	United States
Longe	José Oliveira	Portugal
The Hedonists	Jia Zhang-ke	China
The Hunchback	Ben Rivers, Gabriel Abrantes	Portugal, France

=== Histoire(s) du cinéma ===
Program	English title	Original title	Director(s)	Production country	Year
Alejandro Jodorowsky	The Dance of Reality	La danza de la realidad	Alejandro Jodorowsky	France, Chile	2013
Alejandro Jodorowsky	The Holy Mountain	La montaña sagrada	Alejandro Jodorowsky	Mexico, United States	1973
Alejandro Jodorowsky	Endless Poetry	Poesía sin fin	Alejandro Jodorowsky	France, Chile	2016
Alejandro Jodorowsky	Santa Sangre		Alejandro Jodorowsky	Italy, Mexico	1989
Bill Pullman	Lost Highway		David Lynch	France, United States	1996
Bill Pullman	Zero Effect		Jake Kasdan	USA	1998
David Linde	Crouching Tiger, Hidden Dragon		Ang Lee	Taiwan, Hong Kong, United States, China	2000
David Linde	Y Tu Mamá También		Alfonso Cuarón	Mexico	2001
Howard Shore	Ed Wood		Tim Burton	USA	1994
Howard Shore	Hugo		Martin Scorsese	USA	2011
Howard Shore	The Silence of the Lambs		Jonathan Demme	USA	1991
Howard Shore	Videodrome		David Cronenberg	Canada	1983
Mario Adorf	A cavallo della tigre		Luigi Comencini	Italy	1961
Mario Adorf	The Day the Rains Came	Am Tag als der Regen kam	Gerd Oswald	West Germany	1959
Mario Adorf	The Doctor of Stalingrad	Der Arzt von Stalingrad	Géza von Radványi	West Germany	1958
Mario Adorf	La mala ordina		Fernando Di Leo	Italy, West Germany	1972
Mario Adorf	The Devil Strikes at Night	Nachts, wenn der Teufel kam	Robert Siodmak	West Germany	1957
Roger Corman	The Intruder		Roger Corman	United States	1962
Roger Corman	The Masque of the Red Death		Roger Corman	United States, United Kingdom	1964
Jonas Mekas	Walden		Jonas Mekas	United States	1969
Abbas Kiarostami	Filmando en Cuba con Abbas Kiarostami		Ramiro Pedraza, Martin Snyder, Fatema Abdoolcarim, Kai Tillman, Abbas Kiarostami, Pablo Briones, Alessandro Focareta, Pedro Freire	various	2016
Abbas Kiarostami	Where is the Friend's Home?	Khane-ye doust kodjast?	Abbas Kiarostami	Iran	1988
Clemens Klopfenstein	Geschichte der Nacht		Clemens Klopfenstein	Italy, Switzerland, West Germany, France	1979
Clemens Klopfenstein	Whoafraidwolf	WerAngstWolf	Clemens Klopfenstein	Italy, Switzerland	2000
Jean-Louis Roy	L'inconnu de Shandigor		Jean-Louis Roy	Switzerland	1967
Histoire(s) du cinéma: Special Program	Lovers Are Wet	Koibito-tachi wa nureta	Tatsumi Kumashiro	Japan	1973
Histoire(s) du cinéma	A Destruição de Bernardet		Claudia Priscilla, Pedro Marques	Brazil	2016
Histoire(s) du cinéma	Compêndio da Vida de um Homem Gasto e o Seu Último Desejo Perante Ela		Eugenio Puppo, Ricardo Carioba	Brazil	2014
Histoire(s) du cinéma	Verfluchte Liebe deutscher Film		Dominik Graf, Johannes Sievert	Germany	2016
Histoire(s) du cinéma	Versus: The Life and Films of Ken Loach		Louise Osmond	United Kingdom	2016

=== Retrospective (Retrospettiva) ===
The 2016 retrospective section, Beloved and Rejected: Cinema in the young Federal Republic of Germany from 1949 to 1963, was centered around filmmaking in early West Germany.

English title	Original title	Director(s)	Production country	Year
An Alibi for Death	Ein Alibi zerbricht	Alfred Vohrer	Austria	1963
All Clues Lead to Berlin	Die Spur führt nach Berlin	František Čáp	West Germany	1952
Alvorada - Brazil's Changing Face	Alvorada - Aufbruch in Brasilien	Hugo Niebeling	West Germany	1962
Autobahn		Herbert Vesely	West Germany	1957
Banktresor 713		Werner Klingler	West Germany	1957
Bau 60		Dieter Lemmel	West Germany	1960
Black Gravel	Schwarzer Kies	Helmut Käutner	West Germany	1961
By the Dike Sluice	Am Siel	Peter Nestler	West Germany	1962
The Captain from Cologne	Der Hauptmann von Köln	Slatan Dudow	East Germany	1956
Chased by the Devil	Vom Teufel gejagt	Victor Tourjansky	West Germany	1950
The Condemned Village	Das verurteilte Dorf	Martin Hellberg	East Germany	1952
The Confession of Ina Kahr	Das Bekenntnis der Ina Kahr	G. W. Pabst	West Germany	1954
The Cornet	Der Cornet. Die Weise von Liebe und Tod	Walter Reisch	West Germany	1955
The Day the Rains Came	Am Tag als der Regen kam	Gerd Oswald	West Germany	1959
Den Einsamen allen		Franz Schömbs	West Germany	1962
The Devil Strikes at Night	Nachts, wenn der Teufel kam	Robert Siodmak	West Germany	1957
The Doctor of Stalingrad	Der Arzt von Stalingrad	Géza von Radványi	West Germany	1958
The Dress	Das Kleid	Konrad Petzold	East Germany	1961/1991
Durch Nacht zum Licht		Hans Fischerkoesen	West Germany	1955
The Eighth Day of the Week	Ósmy dzień tygodnia	Aleksander Ford	Polish People's Republic, West Germany	1958
Encounters In The Dark	Spotkania w mroku	Wanda Jakubowska	Polish People's Republic, East Germany	1960
Es muss ein Stück vom Hitler sein		Walter Krüttner	West Germany	1963
Ein Fabeltier fliegt nach Deutschland		Michael Grzimek, Bernhard Grzimek	West Germany	1954
Faces in the Shadow	Ansikten i skugga	Peter Weiss, Christer Strömholm	Sweden	1956
The Fair	Kirmes	Wolfgang Staudte	West Germany	1960
Faust		Peter Gorski	West Germany	1960
Fussball Weltmeisterschaft 1954		Gerhard Grindel, Horst Wigankow, Sammy Drechsel	West Germany	1954
The Glass Tower	Der gläserne Turm	Harald Braun	West Germany	1957
The Haunted Castle	Das Spukschloss im Spessart	Kurt Hoffmann	West Germany	1960
Holiday on Sylt	Urlaub auf Sylt	Annelie Thorndike, Andrew Thorndike	East Germany	1957
The Indian Tomb	Das indische Grabmal	Fritz Lang	West Germany, France, Italy	1959
It Happened in Broad Daylight	Es geschah am hellichten Tag	Ladislao Vajda	Switzerland, West Germany	1958
Jonas		Ottomar Domnick	West Germany	1957
Jungens in den Flegeljahren		Rudolf Werner Kipp	West Germany	1956
Kahl		Haro Senft	West Germany	1961
Kommunikation - Technik der Verständigung		Edgar Reitz	West Germany	1962
Labyrinth		Rolf Thiele	West Germany	1959
Last Stop Love	Endstation Liebe	Georg Tressler	West Germany	1958
Leuchtfeuer		Wolfgang Staudte	East Germany, Sweden	1954
Look at This City	Schaut auf diese Stadt	Karl Gass	East Germany	1962
The Lost One	Der Verlorene	Peter Lorre	West Germany	1951
Machorka-Muff		Jean-Marie Straub, Danièle Huillet	West Germany	1963
Mädchen in Uniform		Géza von Radványi	West Germany, France	1958
Das magische Band		Ferdinand Khittl	West Germany	1959
Many Passed By	Viele kamen vorbei	Peter Pewas	West Germany	1956
Menschen im Werk		Gerhard Lamprecht	West Germany	1957
The Miracle of Father Malachia	Das Wunder des Malachias	Bernhard Wicki	West Germany	1961
Mother Courage and Her Children	Mutter Courage und ihre Kinder	Manfred Wekwerth, Peter Palitzsch	East Germany	1961
Neue Kunst - neues Sehen		Ottomar Domnick	West Germany	1950
No Way Back	Weg ohne Umkehr	Victor Vicas	West Germany	1953
People in the Net	Menschen im Netz	Franz Peter Wirth	West Germany	1959
Die Purpurlinie		Flo Nordhoff	West Germany	1959
Puschkin – Wodka für harte Männer. Elch		Charles Paul Wilp	West Germany	1962
Redhead	Die Rote	Helmut Käutner	West Germany, Italy	1962
The Return of Doctor Mabuse	Im Stahlnetz des Dr. Mabuse	Harald Reinl	West Germany, France, Italy	1961
Roses Bloom on the Moorland	Rosen blühen auf dem Heidegrab	Hans H. König	West Germany	1952
Schichten unter der Dunstglocke		Herbert Viktor	West Germany	1959
Sky Without Stars	Himmel ohne Sterne	Helmut Käutner	West Germany	1955
Speed	Geschwindigkeit	Edgar Reitz	West Germany	1963
Spielbank-Affäre		Arthur Pohl	East Germany	1957
Das Stacheltier: Freie Marktwirtschaft		Richard Groschopp	East Germany	1954
Stalingrad: Dogs, Do You Want to Live Forever?	Hunde, wollt ihr ewig leben	Frank Wisbar	West Germany	1959
Süden im Schatten		Franz-Josef Spieker	West Germany	1962
The Tiger of Eschnapur	Der Tiger von Eschnapur	Fritz Lang	West Germany, France, Italy	1959
The Trapp Family in America	Die Trapp-Familie in Amerika	Wolfgang Liebeneiner	West Germany	1958
Traum in Tusche		Rolf Engler	West Germany	1952
Das Unkraut		Wolfgang Urchs	West Germany	1962
Verstummte Stimmen		Roger Fritz	West Germany	1962
Ein Wagen und sein Werk		Curt A. Engel	West Germany	1953
Weißes Blut		Gottfried Kolditz	East Germany	1959
Werftarbeiter		Wolf Hart	West Germany	1951
Der Wundertisch		Herbert Seggelke	West Germany	1954
You Must Choose Life	Wähle das Leben	Erwin Leiser	Switzerland, Sweden, Austria	1963

=== Open Doors ===
Beginning in 2016, the Open Doors screening and development section initiated a three-year focus on eight South Asian countries: Afghanistan, Bangladesh, Bhutan, Maldives, Myanmar, Nepal, Pakistan and Sri Lanka.

==== Feature-length ====
English title	Original title	Director(s)	Production country	Year
Are You Listening!	Shunte Ki Pao!	Kamar Ahmad Simon	Bangladesh	2012
Hema Hema: Sing Me a Song While I Wait		Khyentse Norbu	Bhutan, Hong Kong	2016
Highway		Deepak Rauniyar	Nepal, United States	2012
The Emerald Jungle	Mya ga naing	Maung Tin Maung	Myanmar	1934
Return to Burma		Midi Z	Taiwan, Myanmar	2011
Television		Mostofa Sarwar Farooki	Bangladesh	2012
The Black Hen	Kalo Pothi	Min Bahadur Bham	Nepal	2015
The Monk		The Maw Naing	Myanmar, Czech Republic	2014
Under Construction		Rubaiyat Hossain	Bangladesh	2015

==== Shorts ====
English title	Original title	Director(s)	Production country	Year
3 Year 3 Month Retreat	Lo Sum Choe Sum	Dechen Roder	Bhutan	2015
720 Degrees		Ishtiaque Zico	Bangladesh	2010
A Forgotten Story		Tashi Gyeltshen	Bhutan	2010
Chandra		Asmita Shrish, Fateme Ahmadi	Nepal, United Kingdom, China	2015
I am Time		Mahde Hasan	Bangladesh	2013
Insein Rhythm		Soe Moe Aung	Myanmar, Germany	2013
Side Glances of Dragon		We Ra Aung	Myanmar	2014
Sweetie Pie		Sai Kong Kham	Myanmar, Germany	2011
The Contagious Apparitions of Dambarey Dendrite		Bibhusan Basnet, Pooja Gurung	Nepal	2013
The Container		Abu Shahed Emon	Bangladesh, South Korea	2012
The Monk in the Forest		Karma Wangchuk	Bhutan	2015
The Shame	Laaz	Sushan Prajapati	Nepal	2015

=== Jury films ===
The festival presents films associated with jurors for the various competitive sections.

English title	Original title	Director(s)	Production country	Year
Bleak Street	La calle de la amargura	Arturo Ripstein	Mexico, Spain	2015
You and the Night	Les rencontres d'après minuit	Yann Gonzalez	France, Switzerland	2013
Soy Nero		Rafi Pitts	Germany, France, Mexico	2016
Frances Ha		Noah Baumbach	United States	2012
Ta’ang		Wang Bing	Hong Kong, France	2016
Suspiria		Dario Argento	Italy	1977
The Lobster		Yorgos Lanthimos	Greece, Ireland, Netherlands, United Kingdom, France	2015
Struggle for Life	La loi de la jungle	Antonin Peretjako	France	2016
Köpek		Esen Isik	Switzerland	2015
Eyes Find Eyes		Sean Price Williams, Jean-Manuel Fernandez	France, United States	2011
Speed	Geschwindigkeit	Edgar Reitz	West Germany	1963
Kommunikation - Technik der Verständigung		Edgar Reitz	West Germany	1962
La herida		Fernando Franco	Spain	2013
Boxcar Bertha		Martin Scorsese	United States	1972
Wolf and Sheep		Shahrbanoo Sadat	Denmark, France, Sweden, Afghanistan	2016
Battle of the Queens	Kampf der Königinnen	Nicolas Steiner	Germany, Switzerland	2011

== Official Awards ==
=== International Competition (Concorso Internazionale) ===
- Pardo d’oro: GODLESS by Ralitza Petrova, Bulgaria/Denmark/France
- Premio speciale della giuria (Special Jury Prize): INIMI CICATRIZATE (Scarred Hearts)by Radu Jude, Romania/Germany
- Pardo per la miglior regia (Best direction): JOÃO PEDRO RODRIGUESforO ORNITÓLOGO, Portugal/France/Brazil
- Pardo per la miglior interpretazione femminile (Best actress): IRENA IVANOVAforGODLESSby Ralitza Petrova, Bulgaria/Denmark/France
- Pardo per la miglior interpretazione maschile (Best actor): ANDRZEJ SEWERYNforOSTATNIA RODZINA (The Last Family) by Jan P. Matuszyński, Poland
- Special Mention: MISTER UNIVERSOby Tizza Covi, Rainer Frimmel, Austria/Italy

=== Filmmakers of the Present Competition (Concorso Cineasti del presente) ===
- Pardo d’oro Cineasti del presente – Premio Nescens: EL AUGE DEL HUMANO by Eduardo Williams, Argentina/Brazil/Portugal
- Premio speciale della giuria Ciné+ Cineasti del presente (Special Jury Prize): THE CHALLENGEby Yuri Ancarani, Italy/France/Switzerland
- Premio per il miglior regista emergente (Prize for the best emerging director): MARIKO TETSUYA for DESTRUCTION BABIES, Japan
- Special Mention: VIEJO CALAVERA by Kiro Russo, Bolivia/Qatar

=== First Feature ===
- Swatch First Feature Award (Prize for Best First Feature): EL FUTURO PERFECTOby Nele Wohlatz, Argentina
- Swatch Art Peace Hotel Award: MAUD ALPI for GORGE CŒUR VENTRE, France
- Special Mention: EL AUGE DEL HUMANO by Eduardo Williams, Argentina/Brazil/Portugal

=== Leopard of Tomorrow (Pardi di Domani) ===
- Concorso internazionale:
- Pardino d’oro per il miglior cortometraggio internazionale – Premio SRG SSR: L’IMMENSE RETOUR (ROMANCE)by Manon Coubia, Belgium/France
- Pardino d’argento SRG SSR per il Concorso internazionale: CILAOSby Camilo Restrepo, France
- Locarno Nomination for the European Film Awards – Premio Pianifica: L’IMMENSE RETOUR (ROMANCE) by Manon Coubia, Belgium/France
- Premio Film und Video Untertitelung: VALPARAISO by Carlo Sironi, Italy
- Special Mention: NON CASTUS by Andrea Castillo, Chile
- Concorso nazionale: Concorso nazionale
- Pardino d’oro per il miglior cortometraggio svizzero – Premio Swiss Life: DIE BRÜCKE ÜBER DEN FLUSSby Jadwiga Kowalska, Switzerland
- Pardino d’argento Swiss Life per il Concorso nazionale: GENESIS by Lucien Monot, Switzerland
- Best Swiss Newcomer Award: LA SÈVE by Manon Goupil, Switzerland
