= Warden of the Dead =

- Directed by: Ilian Simeonov
- Written by: Ilian Simeonov
- Produced by: Dimitar Gochev
- Starring: Vladimir Georgiev; Samuel Finzi; Itzhak Fintzi; Diana Dobreva; Nikolai Urumov
- Cinematography: Dimitar Gochev
- Music by: Theodosii Spassov
- Distributed by: Bulgarska Distributorska Kompanija
- Release date: 2006
- Running time: 105 minutes
- Country: Bulgaria
- Language: Bulgarian

Warden of the Dead (Bulgarian: Пазачът на мъртвите, translit. Pazachyt na myrtvite) is a 2006 Bulgarian film directed by Ilian Simeonov. It was Bulgaria's submission to the 80th Academy Awards for the Academy Award for Best Foreign Language Film, but was not accepted as a nominee.

== Cast ==
- Vladimir Georgiev.....The Boy
- Samuel Finzi.....Ivan
- Itzhak Fintzi.....Angel
- Diana Dobreva.....Maria
- Nikolai Urumov.....Director of the Cemetery

== Awards and nominations ==
Sofia International Film Festival

- 2007: Won, "Burgas Municipality Award 'Silver Sea-Gull'"

== See also ==
- List of submissions to the 80th Academy Awards for Best Foreign Language Film
- List of Bulgarian submissions for the Academy Award for Best Foreign Language Film
