= Tsarichina =

Village in western Bulgaria

Tsarichina is a village in western Bulgaria, located in Kostinbrod Municipality, Sofia Province north of the capital Sofia. In 2021 the village had 72 inhabitants.

== The Tsarichina Hole ==
The town is known for its alleged paranormal activity. In the early 1990s, it was nicknamed "Bulgaria's Area 51" due to the local "Tsarichina Hole". This hole was dug by the Ministry of Defence of Bulgaria, who excavated an area in the center of the village during a project active from 6 December 1990 to 19 November 1992. A group of psychics convinced some influential military members to start an excavation. As the secret "Operation Lightbeam" commenced, the psychics changed their opinion on what to find in Tsarichina several times. They were looking "for a creature – a "yellow-haired monkey", a "Biblical personage", a "hermaphrodite extraterrestrial that would disprove Darwin's theory of evolution and would reveal humanity's extraterrestrial origins", or the hidden treasure of Tsar Samuil. After digging a 160-metre (520 ft) long tunnel at a depth of 70 metres (230 ft) without finding anything for two years, the project was abandoned due to "financial concerns", and the hole was sealed with concrete. It was reported that one psychic committed suicide during the excavation and one involved officer killed himself after the end of the project.

=== In film ===
A 2007 bTV documentary on the Tsarichina project revealed that most of the military documents surrounding the event had disappeared from government archives or had since been destroyed.

Triumph is a 2024 dark comedy/social satire feature film based on the 1990s excavation of the Tsarichina Hole, written and directed by Kristina Grozeva and Petar Valchanov. In the film, the psychic claims to be channelling aliens, and instructs the soldiers to dig for an alien artefact buried long ago, that will make Bulgaria great again.
