= Fear (2020 film) =

2020 film

- Theatrical release poster
- Directed by: Ivaylo Hristov
- Written by: Ivaylo Hristov
- Produced by: Asen Vladimirov
- Starring: Svetlana Yancheva; Michael Flemming
- Cinematography: Emil Christov
- Edited by: Toma Waszarow
- Release date: 2 September 2020
- Running time: 100 minutes
- Country: Bulgaria
- Language: Bulgarian

Fear (Bulgarian: Страх) is a 2020 Bulgarian drama film directed by Ivaylo Hristov. It was selected as the Bulgarian entry for the Best International Feature Film at the 94th Academy Awards, but it was not nominated.

== Synopsis ==
In a Bulgarian village near the Turkish border, an unemployed schoolteacher befriends a refugee from Mali.

== Reception ==
=== Critical response ===
Fear has an approval rating of 100% on review aggregator website Rotten Tomatoes, based on 13 reviews, and an average rating of 8.4/10.

Dennis Harvey, writing for Variety, said the movie was "a disarming, deadpan comedy of xenophobia and resistance."

== Cast ==
- Svetlana Yancheva as Svetla
- Michael Flemming as Bamba

== See also ==
- List of submissions to the 94th Academy Awards for Best International Feature Film
- List of Bulgarian submissions for the Academy Award for Best International Feature Film
