= The Uncle (2022 film) =

- Stric
- Directed by: David Kapac; Andrija Mardešić
- Written by: David Kapac; Andrija Mardešić
- Produced by: Ivan Kelava; Rea Rajčić; Milan Stojanović; Bojan Tišljar; Tina Tišljar; Tomislav Vujić
- Starring: Miki Manojlović; Goran Bogdan; Ivana Roščić; Roko Sikavica
- Cinematography: Miloš Jaćimović
- Edited by: Tomislav Stojanović
- Music by: Miro Manojlović
- Production companies: Eclectica; Sense Production; Croatian Audiovisual Centre; HRT
- Distributed by: Bendita Film Sales
- Release date: 1 December 2022
- Running time: 104 minutes
- Countries: Croatia; Serbia
- Language: Croatian

The Uncle (Croatian: Stric) is a 2022 psychological thriller film written and directed by David Kapac and Andrija Mardešić.

== Plot ==
Set in Yugoslavia during the late 1980s, the film opens with a Croatian family, Father, mother and their adolescent son, hastily preparing for a Christmas Eve dinner where they'll be joined by their Uncle, who is coming to visit from Germany. The family is initially delighted with Uncle's arrival, but their relationship with him appears to be strained. He brings the entire family gifts — Father gets a box of cigarettes, Mother gets a perfume and their Son gets a hunting rifle. They sit down to eat dinner, which is suddenly interrupted by the ringing of a mobile phone, implying a different time period than initially assumed. They spend their evening decorating the Christmas tree, dancing, watching TV and eating biscuits, all of which go wrong in different ways. Finally, the family and Uncle go to bed late at night.

As soon as the lights go out, Uncle gets out of bed, gets into his car and drives off. After his car disappears into the distance, the family starts to plan the same activities for tomorrow. Over the next few days, Christmas Eve seems to repeat indefinitely, becoming progressively more disturbing and surreal, with Uncle using the rifle to threaten the family. The Mother keeps pestering him about the whereabouts of Seka, a relative whom the Uncle is keeping captive in an unknown location. In return for Seka, he is demanding that the family throw a "perfect Christmas party", like the one he remembers from his earlier years, which ended in a family feud and murder. On one occasion, he brings Seka, whom he had been keeping in his car trunk, but only allows her to interact with the family on his own terms. The passing days, marked by violence and increasingly bizarre happenings, finally culminate in a perfect Christmas. The morning of the next day, the joyous family is waving their pleased Uncle goodbye, when he suddenly takes the rifle and shoots Seka, whom the family had forgotten about, and then himself, to the family's dismay. Without a word, they enter his car and drive off, listening to the radio.

== Cast ==
- Miki Manojlović as Uncle
- Goran Bogdan as Father
- Ivana Roščić as Mother
- Roko Sikavica as Son
- Kaja Šišmanović as Seka

== Production ==
Discussing how they came to the original idea for the film, Kapac and Mardešić said: "We realized that we both envied our friends over one thing, which is that during childhood neither of us had an uncle, or a godfather, who lived outside the country and who'd come every holiday and bring gifts, and our friends did. This was the initial idea. When we saw that the film was going to be serious, we remembered all our family situations and realized that the holidays are actually very stressful, even though it is instilled that they must be happy."

The roles of the three family members were written with their respective actors in mind, while the role of Uncle was initially envisioned with a younger actor in mind before it was offered to Manojlović.

== Style and themes ==
When talking about the intended tone and style of the film, the directors noted: "Our film can be all in one, because the beauty and the point of an auteur film is that, as part of the auteur's expression, different poetics, aesthetics, different genres, genre reconstructions and film language reconstructions are incorporated, which is the case with us, because we were inspired by various auteurs, various directions."

The film draws inspiration from and has been compared to the works of Michael Haneke and Yorgos Lanthimos, due to its undertones of social commentary and a tense and unnerving atmosphere. It has been described as absurdist and as holding "not just the family, but the audience [captive] as well", with the constant repetition of psychological violence enacted against the family, as if part of a never-ending loop. Thematically, comparisons have been made between the state of the family and the trauma of their life with Uncle to the history and breakup of Yugoslavia.

== Awards ==
- Sitges Film Festival (2023) — Noves Visions Award for Best Director (David Kapac, Andrija Mardešić)
- Karlovy Vary International Film Festival (2022) — Proxima Competition Special Jury Mention (David Kapac, Andrija Mardešić)
- Pula Film Festival (2022) — Golden Arena for Best Screenplay (David Kapac, Andrija Mardešić) and Best Costume Design (Ana Savić Gecan)
- Fantastic Fest (2023) — Next Wave Award for Best Directors (David Kapac, Andrija Mardešić)
- CinEast (2022) — Young Talents Award (David Kapac, Andrija Mardešić)
