= Blaga's Lessons =

2023 drama film by Stephan Komandarev

- Theatrical release poster
- Bulgarian: Уроците на Блага
- Directed by: Stephan Komandarev
- Written by: Simeon Ventsislavov; Stephan Komandarev
- Produced by: Stephan Komandarev; Katya Trichkova
- Starring: Eli Skorcheva; Stefan Denolyubov; Ivaylo Hristov
- Cinematography: Vesselin Hristov
- Edited by: Nina Altaparmakova
- Music by: Kalina Vasileva
- Production companies: Argo Film; 42film
- Release dates: 3 July 2023 (Karlovy Vary); 17 November 2023 (Bulgaria)
- Running time: 114 minutes
- Countries: Bulgaria; Germany
- Language: Bulgarian
- Budget: €1.14 million

Blaga's Lessons (Bulgarian: Уроците на Блага, romanized: Urotsite na Blaga) is a 2023 drama film directed and produced by Stephan Komandarev, who co-wrote it with Simeon Ventsislavov. The film stars Eli Skorcheva as Blaga, a retired schoolteacher in Shumen, who is grieving the recent death of her husband and falls victim to a criminal scam while trying to raise the money to pay for his gravestone.

Blaga's Lessons premiered at the 57th Karlovy Vary International Film Festival, where it won the Crystal Globe for Best Film. It was selected as the Bulgarian entry for the Academy Award for Best International Feature Film at the 96th Academy Awards. It also fetched Silver Peacock-Best Direction at the 54th International Film Festival of India.

An international co-production of Bulgaria and Germany, the film is the final installment in Komandarev's trilogy on Bulgarian social issues, following Directions (2017) and Rounds (2019).

== Premise ==
Blaga is a retired teacher who falls prey to a cunning phone scam, leaving her penniless. As hope dwindles and her dreams fade away, a tantalizing yet enigmatic job opportunity emerges on her horizon. Once a strict and honest woman, she slowly begins to trample on all her principles.

== Cast ==
- Eli Skorcheva as Blaga
- Stefan Denolyubov
- Ivaylo Hristov
- Ivan Barnev
- Gerasim Gerasimov
- Rozalia Abgarian
- Assen Blatechki
- Irini Zhambonas

== Production ==
=== Development ===
In 2021, it was announced that Stephan Komandarev was working on a film with the working title Hello, which would center around a 70-year-old retired teacher and wrap up his trilogy on Bulgarian societal issues which began with Directions (2017) and Rounds (2019). It was also reported that the film would be Eli Skorcheva's return to acting after a 30-year break.

=== Production ===
Production on the movie was delayed multiple times due to the COVID-19 pandemic. Principal photography eventually began in 2021; however, it experienced further delays after multiple crew members contracted the virus.

== Release ==
Blaga's Lessons premiered in-competition at the 57th Karlovy Vary International Film Festival, where it won the Crystal Globe for Best Film and the Ecumenical Jury Award, and Skorcheva won the award for Best Actress.

The film will receive a theatrical release in Bulgaria on 17 November 2023. It had its North American premiere at the 2023 Calgary International Film Festival, in the International Narrative Competition lineup, and was also screened at the 28th Busan International Film Festival on 6 October, and at the 18th Rome Film Festival, where it was screened in the same month.

== Reception ==
=== Critical response ===
Blaga's Lessons has an approval rating of 100% on review aggregator website Rotten Tomatoes, based on 7 reviews, and an average rating of 7.5/10.

=== Awards and nominations ===
In September 2023, the film was selected as Bulgaria's submission for the Academy Award for Best International Feature Film at the 96th Academy Awards.

It received the Special Jury Prize and the Critics' Prize at the 2023 CinEast Film Festival

== See also ==
- List of submissions to the 96th Academy Awards for Best International Feature Film
- List of Bulgarian submissions for the Academy Award for Best International Feature Film
