= Ága (film) =

2018 film directed by Milko Lazarov

- Promotional release poster
- Directed by: Milko Lazarov
- Written by: Simeon Ventsislavov; Milko Lazarov
- Starring: Mikhail Aprosimov
- Music by: Penka Kouneva
- Release date: 23 February 2018 (Berlin)
- Running time: 96 minutes
- Countries: Bulgaria; Germany; France
- Language: Yakut
- Box office: $78,082

Ága is a 2018 drama film directed by Milko Lazarov and written by Lazarov and Simeon Ventsislavov. It was selected as the Bulgarian entry for the Best International Feature Film at the 92nd Academy Awards, but it was not nominated.

== Plot ==
After his wife Sedna passes away, Nanook sets out to find their daughter Ága who ran away long ago.

== Cast ==
- Mikhail Aprosimov as Nanook
- Feodosia Ivanova as Sedna
- Sergei Egorov as Chena

== Reception ==
Ága has an approval rating of 96% on review aggregator website Rotten Tomatoes, based on 23 reviews, and an average rating of 7.9/10.

The film has gotten 26 wins and 12 nominations at international film festivals.

== See also ==
- List of submissions to the 92nd Academy Awards for Best International Feature Film
- List of Bulgarian submissions for the Academy Award for Best International Feature Film
