= Black Money for White Nights =

2026 Bulgarian tragicomedy film

- Theatrical release poster
- Bulgarian: Черни пари за бели нощи
- Directed by: Petar Valchanov; Kristina Grozeva
- Screenplay by: Petar Valchanov; Kristina Grozeva; Decho Taralezhkov
- Produced by: Petar Valchanov; Kristina Grozeva
- Starring: Tanya Shahova; Ivan Savov; Margita Gosheva; Ivan Barnev; Sibila Petrova
- Cinematography: Alexander Stanishev
- Edited by: Yorgos Mavropsaridis
- Music by: Theodore Oikonomou
- Production companies: Abraxas Film; Graal Films
- Distributed by: Cercamon
- Release date: 6 July 2026 (KVIFF)
- Running time: 94 minutes
- Countries: Bulgaria; Greece
- Language: Bulgarian

Black Money for White Nights (Bulgarian: Черни пари за бели нощи) is a 2026 tragicomedy film directed by Petar Valchanov, and Kristina Grozeva who co-wrote the screenplay with Decho Taralezhkov. Starring Tanya Shahova, Ivan Savov, Margita Gosheva, Ivan Barnev, and Sibila Petrova, the film follows middle-aged couple sixty-year-old Marina and her husband Gosha from Bulgaria, who lose their life savings in a travel scam.

The film, a co-production between Bulgaria, and Greece premiered at the 60th Karlovy Vary International Film Festival on 6 July 2026, where it was nominated for the Crystal Globe.

== Cast ==
- Tanya Shahova as Marina
- Ivan Savov as Gosha
- Margita Gosheva as Lyudmila
- Ivan Barnev as Kosyo
- Sibila Petrova

== Release ==
Black Money for White Nights had its world premiere at the 2026 Karlovy Vary International Film Festival on 6 July 2026 in Crystal Globe Competition. Cercamon has acquired the international sales rights of the film.

The film will be screened at the Warsaw International Film Festival on 11 October 2026. In November, it had its Spanish premiere at the 23rd Seville European Film Festival.

It will be in European Competition at the Arras Film Festival in the first fortnight of November 2026.

== Reception ==
Mariana Hristova, reviewing the film at the Karlovy Vary International Film Festival for Cineuropa, praised the film as a well-crafted social drama that uses an intimate family story to explore wider issues of corruption, morality, and political divisions in contemporary Bulgaria. Hristova also commended the performances of Tanya Shahova and Ivan Savov. Specifically cinematographer Alexander Stanishev's work was praised as it created an atmosphere that shifts between "bittersweet nostalgia" and "stilled, mouldering decay." Hristova concluded that Black Money for White Nights is a "well-scripted, visually impeccable, rhythmically balanced, engaging and bitterly funny," film. She also observed that in spite of this its thematic message leaves relatively little room for alternative interpretations.

== Accolades ==
The film was shortlisted for a nomination at the 39th European Film Awards in the Feature Film category.

| Award | Date of ceremony | Category | Recipient(s) | Result | Ref |
|---|---|---|---|---|---|
| Karlovy Vary International Film Festival | 11 July 2026 | Crystal Globe Grand Prix | Black Money for White Nights | Nominated | |
