= Vasil (film) =

- Theatrical release poster
- Directed by: Avelina Prat
- Written by: Avelina Prat
- Starring: Ivan Barnev; Karra Elejalde; Alexandra Jiménez; Sue Flack; Susi Sánchez
- Cinematography: Santiago Racaj
- Music by: Vincent Barrière
- Production companies: Distinto Films; Diferente Film AIE; Activist 38
- Distributed by: Filmax
- Release dates: October 2022 (Warsaw); 4 November 2022 (Spain)
- Countries: Spain; Bulgaria
- Language: Spanish

Vasil is a 2022 Spanish-Bulgarian comedy-drama film written and directed by Avelina Prat in her directorial feature debut, which stars Ivan Barnev (as the title character), Karra Elejalde, and Alexandra Jiménez alongside Susi Sánchez, and Sue Flack.

== Plot ==
The plot follows the relation of friendship developed between Vasil (an intelligent and charismatic Bulgarian immigrant, as well as skilled player of bridge and chess) and Alfredo, a retired and widowed gruffy architect who welcomes the former into his house, amazement of Luisa (Alfredo's daughter as well as translator and bibliophile) notwithstanding.

== Cast ==
- Ivan Barnev as Vasil
- Karra Elejalde as Alfredo
- Alexandra Jiménez as Luisa
- Susi Sánchez as Carmen
- Sue Flack
- Lorena López
- Pepo Blasco

== Production ==
A Spanish-Bulgarian co-production, the film was produced by Diferente Films AIE and Distinto Films alongside Activist 38. and it had the participation of RTVE, TV3, and À Punt Mèdia and support from ICAA, IVC, ICEC, and Creative Europe's MEDIA. Shooting locations included Valencia, Sueca, Silla and Puerto de Sagunto. Santiago Racaj worked as cinematographer whereas Mónica Bernuy took over art direction.

== Release ==
Vasil had its world premiere at the Warsaw Film Festival. Its festival run also included the Valladolid International Film Festival (Seminci) and the Mostra de València. Originally included in the Seminci's 'Meeting Point' slate, the film was included in the festival's official selection instead upon the disqualification of Jaime Chávarri's La manzana de oro. Distributed by Filmax, it was theatrically released in Spain on 4 November 2022.

== Reception ==
Carlos Marañón of Cinemanía rated the "spoken and delayed film featuring an original rhythm of its own" with 3 out of 5 stars, considering that even if the profusion of certain situations can become somewhat repetitive, the pause and the acting work "leave a strange but addictive peace, very uncommon in recent cinema".

Elsa Fernández-Santos of El País deemed Prat's debut feature to be a "kind story of friendship", otherwise featuring elements of costumbrista comedy and autobiographical tones.

Mariana Hristova of Cineuropa highlighted Elejalde and Barnev for their "organic performance of the graceful nuances in the communication between two people who represent opposing universes", while adding that the indoor settings and warm tones manage to create an "intimate atmosphere".

== Accolades ==
Year	Award	Category	Nominee(s)	Result	Ref.
2022	67th Valladolid International Film Festival	Best Actor	Karra Elejalde & Ivan Barnev	Won	
2022	5th Berlanga Awards	Best Film		Won	
2022	5th Berlanga Awards	Best Director	Avelina Prat	Won	
2022	5th Berlanga Awards	Best Screenplay	Avelina Prat	Won	
2022	5th Berlanga Awards	Best Original Score	Vincent Barrière	Won	
2022	5th Berlanga Awards	Best Sound	Iván Martínez Rufat	Won	
2022	5th Berlanga Awards	Best Production Supervision	Lorena Lluch	Nominated	
2022	5th Berlanga Awards	Best Supporting Actress	Susi Sánchez	Won	
2022	5th Berlanga Awards	Best Costume Design	Giovanna Ribes	Nominated	
2022	15th Gaudí Awards	Best New Director	Avelina Prat	Nominated	
2023	10th Feroz Awards	Best Comedy Film		Nominated	
2023	10th Feroz Awards	Best Actor in a Film	Karra Elejalde	Nominated	

== See also ==
- List of Spanish films of 2022
