= Sneakers (2011 film) =

2011 film

- Theatrical release poster
- Directed by: Valeri Yordanov; Ivan Vladimirov
- Written by: Valeri Yordanov
- Produced by: Kiril Kirilov; Galina Toneva
- Starring: Ivo Arakov
- Cinematography: Rali Raltschev
- Release date: 27 June 2011 (Moscow)
- Running time: 111 minutes
- Country: Bulgaria
- Language: Bulgarian

Sneakers (Bulgarian: Кецове, translit. Kecove) is a 2011 Bulgarian adventure drama film directed by Valeri Yordanov and Ivan Vladimirov. The film won a Special Mention at the 2011 Moscow International Film Festival. It was also selected as the Bulgarian entry for the Best Foreign Language Oscar at the 85th Academy Awards, but it didn't make the final shortlist.

== Plot ==
The characters set off for a vacation at the seaside leaving their problems (family problems, relationship problems, trouble with the police) in the city (Sofia) behind. They meet at a remote beach at the Black Sea and form a band of young people spending time together living on the beach. The film describes their individual personalities, their philosophies and struggles with live and their relationship with the other characters in a hippiesque environment.

== Cast ==
- Ivo Arakov as Wee
- Phillip Avramov as The Bird
- Ivan Barnev as Ivo
- Vasil Draganov as Fatso
- Iva Gocheva as The Barmaid
- Ina Nikolova as Emi
- Yana Titova as Polly
- Marian Valev as H
- Valeri Yordanov as Gray

== See also ==
- List of submissions to the 85th Academy Awards for Best Foreign Language Film
- List of Bulgarian submissions for the Academy Award for Best Foreign Language Film
