= Losers (film) =

2015 film

- Theatrical release poster
- Directed by: Ivaylo Hristov
- Written by: Ivaylo Hristov
- Starring: Elena Telbis
- Release dates: 22 June 2015 (MIFF); 1 April 2016 (Bulgaria)
- Running time: 97 minutes
- Country: Bulgaria
- Language: Bulgarian
- Box office: $103,287

Losers (Bulgarian: Каръци, Karatsi) is a 2015 Bulgarian comedy-drama film directed by Ivaylo Hristov. It won the Golden George at the 2015 Moscow International Film Festival. It was selected as the Bulgarian entry for the Best Foreign Language Film at the 89th Academy Awards but it was not nominated.

== Cast ==
- Elena Telbis
- Deyan Donkov
- Ovanes Torosian
- Georgi Gotzin
- Plamen Dimov

== See also ==
- List of submissions to the 89th Academy Awards for Best Foreign Language Film
- List of Bulgarian submissions for the Academy Award for Best Foreign Language Film
