= Living Legends (film) =

- Film poster
- Directed by: Niki Iliev
- Written by: Niki Iliev
- Release date: 14 February 2014
- Running time: 100 minutes
- Country: Bulgaria
- Language: Bulgarian

Living Legends (Bulgarian: Живи легенди) is a 2014 Bulgarian comedy film written and directed by Niki Iliev. Director Locations = Ivo Atanasiv

== Cast ==
- Orlin Pavlov - Pavel
- Niki Iliev - Boyan
- Sanya Borisova - Chrisi
- Dimo Alexiev - Martin
- Lubomir Kovatchev - Doncho
- Georgi Kadurin - Julian
- Yana Marinova - Monika
- Michele Placido - Cristiano Negri
