= Directions (film) =

2017 film

- Film poster
- Directed by: Stephan Komandarev
- Written by: Simeon Ventsislavov; Stephan Komandarev
- Produced by: Stephan Komandarev; Katya Trichkova; Stelios Ziannis; Vera Weit; Vladimir Anastasov; Angela Nestorovska
- Starring: Vassil Vassilev-Zuek; Ivan Barnev; Assen Blatechki; Dobrin Dosev; Guerassim Gueorguiev-Gero; Irini Zhambonas; Vasil Banov; Troyan Gogov; Dimitar Banenkin; Stefan Denolyubov
- Cinematography: Vesselin Hristov
- Edited by: Nina Altaparmakova
- Release date: 26 May 2017 (Cannes)
- Running time: 103 minutes
- Countries: Bulgaria; Germany; Macedonia
- Language: Bulgarian

Directions (Bulgarian: Посоки - translit. Posoki) is a 2017 Bulgarian drama film directed by Stephan Komandarev. It was screened in the Un Certain Regard section at the 2017 Cannes Film Festival.

The film is the first part of a trilogy about social conditions in Bulgaria, followed by Rounds (V krag) in 2019 and Blaga's Lessons (Urotcite na Blaga) in 2023.

== Cast ==
- Ivan Barnev as Vlado
- Georgi Kadurin as Popov
- Borisleva Stratieva as Lora
- Anna Komandareva as Nikol
- Vassil Vassilev as Misho
