= Sofia International Film Festival =

Film festival in Sofia, Bulgaria

- Location: Sofia, Bulgaria
- Founded: 1997; 29 years ago
- Most recent: 2026
- Awards: Sofia Award; FIPRESCI Platinum Award; Grand Prize
- Hosted by: Art Fest; Sofia Municipality; Ministry of Culture; National Film Center Agency; MEDIA sub-programme of Creative Europe
- Festival date: Opening: 12 March 2026; Closing: 31 March 2026
- Language: International
- Website: siff.bg

Most recent: 30th
- 31st 29th

Sofia International Film Festival (SIFF) (Bulgarian: Международен София Филм Фест, София Филм Фест), also known as Sofia Film Fest, is an annual film festival in Sofia, capital city of Bulgaria, taking place in March each year. It was established in 1997 and is the only film festival in Bulgaria recognised by FIPRESCI.

== History ==
The festival was established in 1997, as a thematic music film festival.

Since 2003, the festival has included an International Competition and has been included in the FIPRESCI calendar. A regional and national competition for short films was introduced in the same year (the Jameson Short Film Award). In 2009 an international documentary film competition was added.

In 2010, SIFF was accredited by FIAPF as a competitive specialised feature film festival, becoming the only Bulgarian film festival to gain such recognition. It is also the only Bulgarian film festival recognised by FIPRESCI.

In 2010, due to the "Year of Bulgarian cinema" initiative, the festival focused on Bulgarian productions. In the same year, SIFF was accredited by the International Federation of Film Producers Associations (FIAPF). Since its creation the director of the festival has been Stefan Kitanov.

The 2020 edition of the festival was postponed from its initial March dates and split into two parts, rolled out in June and September, because of the COVID-19 pandemic. Subsequently, the 2021 edition of the festival, which is also the 25th anniversary edition, was held both online and offline in a hybrid format.

The 31st edition of the festival will be held from 12 to 31 March, 2027.

== Description ==
Featured in Variety's Top 50 film festivals in 2007, the event presents Bulgaria to the world as the host one of the important film festivals in Europe and takes place annually in March. It brings contemporary world cinema to the domestic audience in Bulgaria and the latest in Bulgarian cinema to the rest of the world.

The festival is organised by Art Fest under the auspices of the Municipality of Sofia and in partnership with the Bulgarian Ministry of Culture, the National Palace of Culture, the Bulgarian National Film Center and Bulgarian National Television with the support of the Creative Europe Media, the LUX Film Prize and other corporate and institutional sponsors.

== Past attendees ==
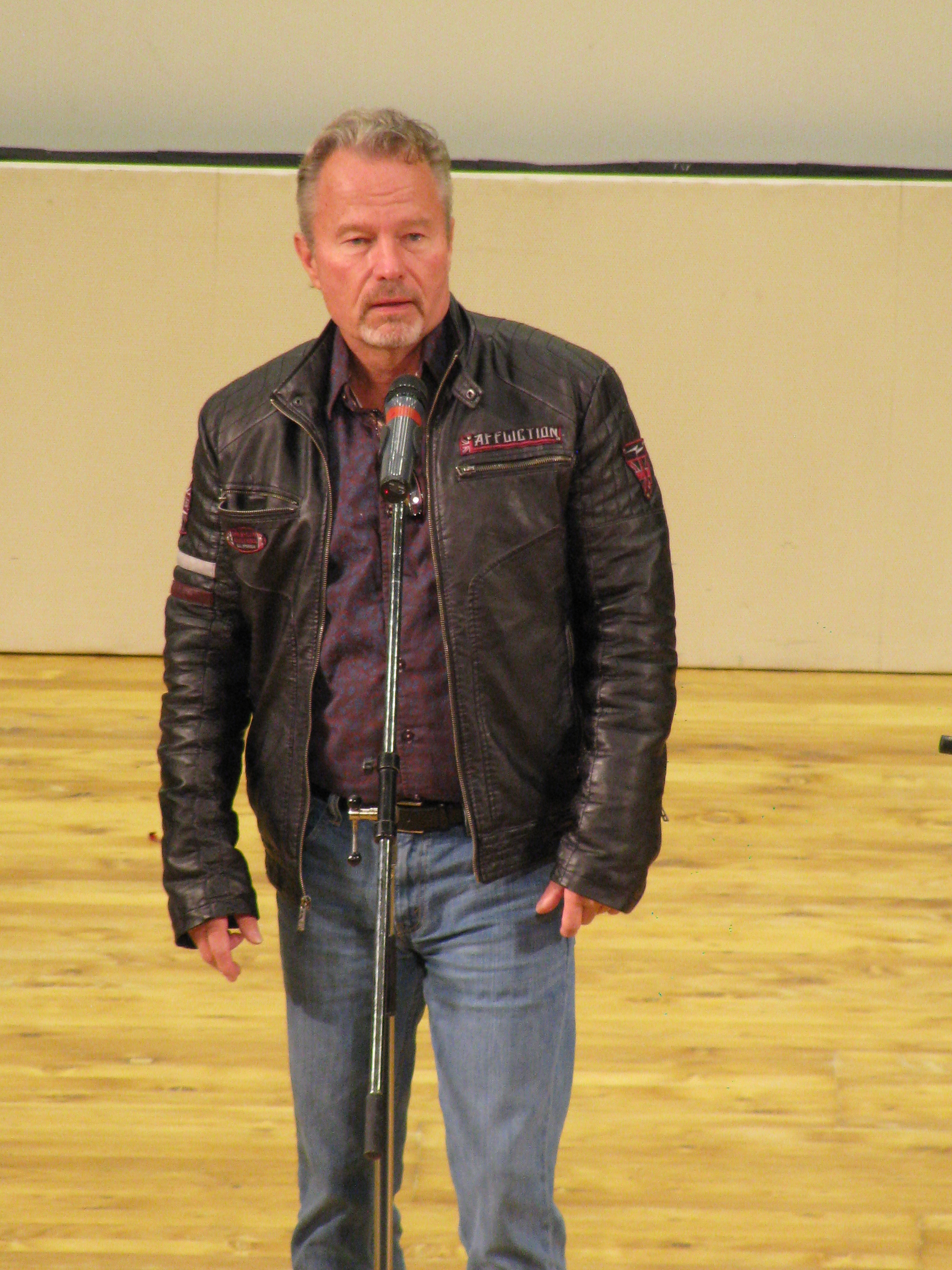
John Savage discussing Hair at Sofia International Film Festival, March 2017

Some of the filmmakers and other professionals who have attended the festival include Zlatko Topčić (Bosnia and Herzegovina), Wim Wenders, Volker Schlöndorff, Katja Riemann and Karl Baumgartner (Germany), Alan Parker, Peter Greenaway, Terry Jones, Michael Palin, Tony Palmer and David Mackenzie (United Kingdom), Nikita Mikhalkov, Andrei Konchalovsky, Karen Shakhnazarov and Bakhtyar Khudojnazarov (Russia), Jiří Menzel, Jan Svěrák, Jan Hřebejk and Petr Zelenka (Czech Republic), Emir Kusturica (Yugoslavia), Krzysztof Zanussi (Poland), Otar Iosseliani (Georgia), Jean-Claude Carrière, Agnès Varda, Siegfried and Jacques Dorfmann (France), Assumpta Serna (Spain), Bent Hamer and Unni Straume (Norway), Jafar Panahi and Babak Payami (Iran), Jerry Schatzberg, Michael Wadleigh and Lech Kowalski (USA), Jos Stelling (the Netherlands), Mika Kaurismäki (Finland), the director of 499, Rodrigo Reyes (Mexico), Friðrik Þór Friðriksson (Iceland), Lone Scherfig (Denmark), Kornél Mundruczó (Hungary), Goran Markovic, Goran Paskaljević, Radivoje Andric, Dusan Milic, Srđan Karanović and Srđan Dragojević (Serbia) and many others.
