= Kristina Grozeva =

Bulgarian filmmaker

- Born: Kristina Yordanova Grozeva; Sofia, Bulgaria
- Education: Sofia University (MJ); National Academy for Theatre and Film Arts (MFA)
- Occupations: Film director; film producer; screenwriter
- Years active: 2004–present
- Partner: Petar Valchanov

Kristina Yordanova Grozeva (Bulgarian: Кристина Йорданова Грозева) is a Bulgarian filmmaker. She is best known for her feature films The Lesson (2014), Glory (2016), The Father (2019), and Triumph (2024).

== Early life and education ==
Kristina Yordanova Grozeva was born in Sofia, Bulgaria.

She has master's degrees in journalism and film and television directing from Sofia University and the National Academy for Theatre and Film Arts, respectively. She completed a degree in directing in the class of Georgi Djulgerov.

== Career ==
Since graduation, Grozeva has been working with her husband, fellow Bulgarian director Petar Valchanov. In 2013, their short film Jump was nominated for Best Short Film at the European Film Awards.

In 2014, they released their first feature film The Lesson, which won awards at the film festivals in San Sebastián, Tokyo, Warsaw, Gothenburg, Thessaloniki, Sofia.

The pair next directed the 2016 drama film Glory, which premiered at the Locarno Film Festival and was positively received by critics.

Their 2019 film The Father, which features a brief appearance by their then-student Maria Bakalova, won the Crystal Globe Award at the Karlovy Vary International Film Festival. Both Glory and The Father were selected as the Bulgarian entries for the Best International Feature Film at the 90th and 93rd Academy Awards, respectively.

The third film of their "newspaper clippings" trilogy (after The Lesson and Glory) is the 2024 comedy Triumph, based on the 1990s excavation of the "Tsarichina Hole" by the Bulgarian military following the instructions of a psychic.

== Recognition ==
Grozeva is a member of the European Film Academy.

== Selected filmography ==
Year	Title	Director	Writer	Producer	Notes
2008	Family Therapy	Yes	Yes	Yes	Short film
2010	Emergency Landing	Yes	No	No	TV film
2012	Jump	Yes	Yes	Yes	Short film
2014	The Lesson	Yes	Yes	Yes	
2016	Glory	Yes	Yes	Yes	
2019	The Father	Yes	Yes	Yes	
2024	Triumph	Yes	Yes	Yes	
2026	Black Money for White Nights	Yes	Yes	Yes	
