= Stephan Komandarev =

Bulgarian film director (born 1966)

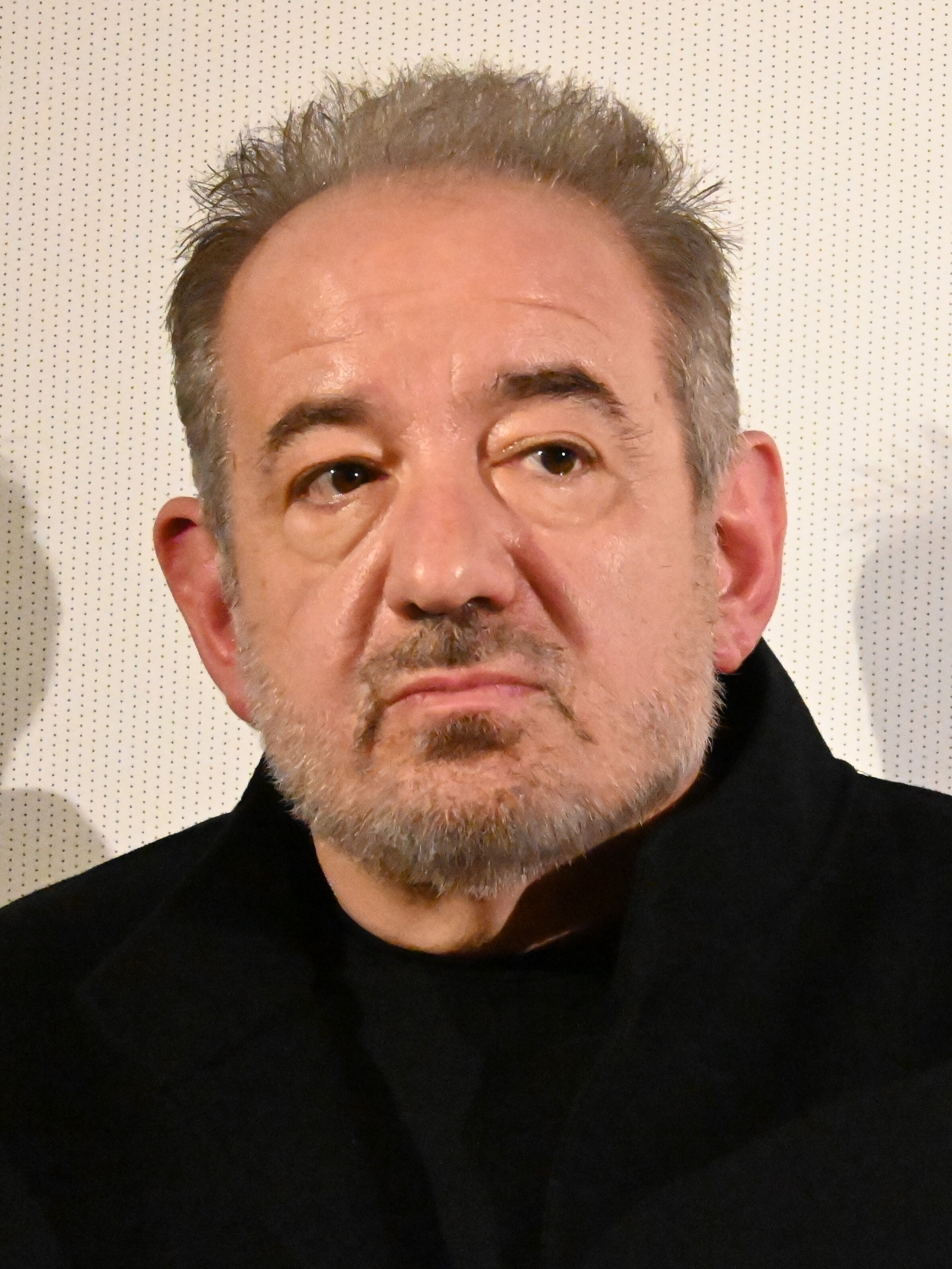
- Komandarev in 2024
- Born: September 28, 1966 (age 59); Sofia, Bulgaria
- Years active: 1990s–present

Stephan Komandarev (born September 28, 1966) is a Bulgarian film director, producer and screenwriter. His films have been selected on three occasions as Bulgaria's submission to the Academy Awards for the Best International Feature Film competition.

== Career ==
Blaga's Lessons won Best Film at Bulgaria’s Golden Rose Film Festival and entered the main competition at the 2023 CinEast film festival. The film also fetched Silver Peacock-Best Director at the 54th International Film Festival of India.

== Films ==
- Dog's Home (Pansion za Kucheta) — 2000
- Bread Over the Fence (Hlyab nad Ogradata) — 2002
- Alphabet of Hope (Azbuka na Nadejdata) — 2004
- The World Is Big and Salvation Lurks Around the Corner (Svetat e golyam i spasenie debne otvsyakade) — 2009
- The Town of Badante Women (Gradat na Jenite Badante) — 2010
- The Judgement (Sadilishteto) — 2014
- Sailor Stories (Moryachki Istorii) — 2016
- Directions (Posoki) — 2017
- Rounds (V krag) — 2019
- Life from Life — 2021
- Blaga's Lessons (Urotcite na Blaga) — 2023
- Made in EU — 2025
