= Glory (2016 film) =

- French theatrical release poster
- Bulgarian: Слава
- Directed by: Kristina Grozeva; Petar Valchanov
- Written by: Kristina Grozeva; Petar Valchanov; Decho Taralezhkov
- Produced by: Kristina Grozeva; Petar Valchanov
- Starring: Stefan Denolyubov; Margita Gosheva
- Cinematography: Krum Rodriguez
- Edited by: Petar Valchanov
- Music by: Hristo Namliev
- Production companies: Abraxas Film; Graal Films; Screening Emotions; Aporia Filmworks; Red Carpet
- Distributed by: Film Movement (United States)
- Release dates: 4 August 2016 (Festival del film Locarno); 22 September 2016 (Golden Rose National Film Festival [Varna, Bulgaria])
- Running time: 101 minutes
- Countries: Bulgaria; Greece
- Language: Bulgarian
- Box office: $92,649

Glory (Bulgarian: Слава, translit. Slava) is a 2016 Bulgarian drama film written and directed by Kristina Grozeva and Petar Valchanov. The second film in the directors' "newspaper-clippings trilogy", the film is a social-realist parable exploring the themes of corruption, class differences, and the rural-urban divide, in contemporary Bulgarian society. It was selected as the Bulgarian entry for the Best Foreign Language Film at the 90th Academy Awards, but it was not nominated.

== Plot ==
Railway trackman Tsanko Petrov discovers a large amount of money in bundles on the tracks, but instead of taking the cash for himself he notifies the authorities. The sophisticated head of PR at Bulgaria's Ministry of Transport, Julia Staykova, takes the opportunity to deflect a brewing corruption scandal by holding a ceremony to hail Tsanko as a working-class hero. Unkempt and dishevelled with a debilitating stutter, Tsanko is ridiculed by Julia's PR team while they parade him for the press as a hero. In order for the Minister to present Tsanko with a new digital watch, Julia removes Tsanko's own Slava-brand watch, an heirloom passed down from his father. However, she then loses it, ignores him when he tries to contact her, and finally replaces the watch with a fake.

In anger, Tsanko goes to the press and exposes the corruption and theft that is endemic in the transportation ministry, and the Minister's complicity in the crime.

In an attempt to save the ministry, Julia arranges for Tsanko to be framed for a crime he did not commit. He is then coerced into retracting his earlier accusations, in exchange for release from prison. On his way home, he is accosted by his co-workers, who are angry with him for exposing their crime ring. It is also implied that Tsanko's beloved rabbits had died from neglect, due to his long absence while in prison.

The following day, Julia reads in the newspaper that a trackman had committed suicide. Racked with guilt for her role in causing the death of a good man, she gets drunk and searches her office desperately for the missing watch. The following morning, she both finds the watch, and receives word that the dead trackman is actually not Tsanko. Feeling relieved, she drives to his home to return the watch personally. Whereupon she finds a severely injured Tsanko, furious with her for having triggered the entire chain of events. The movie ends with a glimpse of Tsanko grabbing his wrench and Julia screaming, while her oblivious husband sits in their car nearby listening to music.

== Cast ==
- Stefan Denolyubov as Tsanko Petrov
- Margita Gosheva as Julia Staykova
- Kitodar Todorov as Valeri
- Milko Lazarov as Kiril Kolev
- Georgi Stamenov as Doctor
- Ivan Savov as Minister Kanchev
- Mira Iskarova as Galya
- Hristofor Nedkov as Porter

== Development ==
An event reported in the Bulgarian press inspired the film. One of the film's directors (Petar Valchanov) stated in an interview:

As is the case with The Lesson, the film starts where the news story ends. We read this story about a lineman who found а huge pile of cash on the railway, gave it to the police and was later given this quasi-award for valor, and we thought it was a very fertile premise for a broader and more revealing plot.

In another interview, the directors elaborated that in constructing the screenplay of the film, they take the superficial parts of real-life stories reported in the news media. A separate real-life event that the directors incorporated into Glory was an incident where an architect is forced to apologize.

== Production ==
The film, originally known as The Pledge, was scheduled to film in July–August 2015, in Sofia and surrounding villages. The budget was reported as €260,000, including a €190,000 grant from the Bulgarian National Film Center.

== Release ==
Relying on the strength of the directors' previous film, Italy's I Wonder Pictures bought the film in February 2016, while Glory was in post-production, Distribution rights for the film were later sold to Filmarti (Turkey), Arti Film (Benelux), La Aventura Audiovisual (Spain), JSC Europos Kinas (Lithuania), Bounty Films (Australia and New Zealand), and Film Movement (United States and English-speaking Canada).

The film had its world premiere at the 2016 Locarno International Film Festival (in Switzerland).

== Reception ==
=== Critical response ===
Glory has an approval rating of 94% on review aggregator website Rotten Tomatoes, based on 32 reviews, and an average rating of 7.6/10. Metacritic assigned the film a weighted average score of 83 out of 100, based on 8 critics, indicating "universal acclaim".

=== Accolades ===
Best International Film won at Kolkata International Film Festival, 2016. At the 2016 Locarno International Film Festival, Glory received a special mention from the International Federation of Film Societies (FICC/IFFS) jury.

At the Avvantura Film Festival in Zadar, Croatia, Glory won the Grand Prix (top prize) as well as the Best Actor award (Stefan Denolyubov).

At the Golden Rose Bulgarian Feature Film Festival in September 2016, Glory won the Special Award of the City of Varna, the Best Screenwriter Award, the Best Cinematographer Award (to Krum Rodriguez for his work on both Glory and Godless), the Union of Bulgarian Filmmakers Award, and the Accredited Journalists' Award.

The film won the top prize at the 2016 Hamptons International Film Festival, the HIFF Award for Best Narrative Feature Film, consisting of a film production-services package worth more than $125,000 along with a $3,000 cash prize.

At the 2016 KineNova film festival in Skopje, Glory won the best film award.

At Film Fest Gent in October 2016, Glory was in official competition and received a special mention from the jury, which said it admired the film "for its humor and its political and moral honesty".

In the 15th edition of Tirana International Film Festival, Glory won the Best Feature Film.

Best International Feature Film, Edinburgh International Film Festival 2017

== See also ==
- Stuttering in popular culture
- The Lesson (2014 Bulgarian film)
- List of submissions to the 90th Academy Awards for Best Foreign Language Film
- List of Bulgarian submissions for the Academy Award for Best Foreign Language Film
