= The Lesson (2014 Bulgarian film) =

2014 film

- Film poster
- Bulgarian: Урок
- Directed by: Kristina Grozeva; Petar Valchanov
- Written by: Kristina Grozeva; Petar Valchanov
- Produced by: Magdelena Ilieva
- Starring: Margita Gosheva; Ivan Barnev
- Cinematography: Krum Rodriguez
- Edited by: Peter Valchanov
- Production companies: Abraxas Film; Graal Films; Little Wing Productions; Screening Emotions
- Distributed by: Film Movement (US)
- Release date: 4 September 2014 (TIFF)
- Running time: 111 minutes
- Countries: Bulgaria; Greece
- Language: Bulgarian
- Box office: $13,953

The Lesson (Bulgarian: Урок, translit. Urok) is a 2014 Bulgarian drama film written and directed by Kristina Grozeva and Petar Valchanov. It was screened in the Contemporary World Cinema section at the 2014 Toronto International Film Festival.

== Plot ==
A middle-school teacher with a young daughter has several stresses in her life: one of her students is a petty thief, her father has taken up with a much younger woman after his wife died, and her husband is an unemployed drunkard who has wasted her earnings, supposedly trying to fix a broken-down camper rather than making the mortgage payments on their home. It has all become too much, as the bank is uncooperative, dismissive, and rigid regarding her situation, so she resorts to drastic measures to save her home from foreclosure.

== Cast ==
- Margita Gosheva
- Ivan Barnev
- Ivanka Bratoeva
- Stefan Denolyubov
- Ivan Savov
- Andreya Todorova
- Poli Angelova as The Secretary

== Release ==
The Lesson premiered at the 2014 Toronto International Film Festival on 4 September 2014 and proceeded to make its rounds at different film festivals for another year.

=== Critical reception ===
The film received generally positive reviews from critics. On review aggregator website Rotten Tomatoes, the film has an 83% rating based on 23 reviews, with an average rating of 7.33/10. Metacritic reports a 68 out of 100 rating based on 7 critics, indicating "generally favorable reviews".

=== Awards and accolades ===
The Lesson was one of the three finalists for the 2015 European Parliament LUX Prize.
