= Petar Valchanov =

Bulgarian filmmaker

- Born: Petar Valchanov; Plovdiv, Bulgaria
- Education: National Academy for Theatre and Film Arts (MFA)
- Occupations: Film director; film producer; screenwriter
- Years active: 2004–present
- Partner: Kristina Grozeva

Petar Valchanov (Bulgarian: Петър Вълчанов) is a Bulgarian filmmaker. He is best known for his feature films The Lesson (2014), Glory (2016), The Father (2019), and Triumph (2024).

== Early life and education ==
Petar Valchanov was born in Plovdiv, Bulgaria.

In 2000, he graduated from the Tsanko Lavrenov Art High School in Plovdiv. In 2008, he graduated from the National Academy for Theatre and Film Arts with a degree in film and television directing in the class of Ludmil Staikov.

== Career ==
Valchanov has worked on many projects alongside his partner Kristina Grozeva, including the short film Family Therapy (2008), the television film Emergency Landing (2010), Samburu (2011), and others.

In 2012, the pair co-wrote and co-directed the short film Jump, which was nominated for Best Short Film at the European Film Awards and won the Grand Prix at the Brussels Short Film Festival as well as best film at the Bulgarian Film Academy Awards in 2013.

Their debut feature film The Lesson (2014) received international recognition at numerous film festivals around the world, including festivals in Toronto, San Sebastián, Warsaw, Tokyo, Thessaloniki, Gothenburg, Sofia and many others, and is the most awarded Bulgarian film of all The Lesson is the first part of a trilogy inspired by newspaper articles. Valchanov and Grozeva were inspired by real events during the development of the script. They recalled:

We are inspired by real stories that are absurd. The absurdity in reality is the element that unleashes our imagination and ignites our creative passion. And there is a lot of it in the newspapers. Tragicomism, the most important ingredient in our films, is born from it. In both The Lesson and Glory, the real story serves us only as a springboard from which to jump and whip up our imagination.

The second film from the trilogy, Glory, which premiered at the Locarno Film Festival was positively received by critics. Its plot revolves around a cantoner who finds millions on a railway line and then hands them over to the police. Glory won awards at many international film festivals and was selected as the Bulgarian entriy for the Best International Feature Film at the 90th Academy Awards.

Before the last film of the trilogy, the pair directed 2019's The Father, which features a brief appearance by their then-student Maria Bakalova and won the Crystal Globe Award at the Karlovy Vary International Film Festival. Although the film is not autobiographical, Grozeva and Valchanov stated that the story was very personal to them and that the script was ready even before that of Glory. The Father wаs selected as the Bulgarian entry for the Best International Feature Film at the 93rd Academy Awards.

The third film of their "newspaper clippings" trilogy (after The Lesson and Glory) is the 2024 comedy Triumph, based on the 1990s excavation of the "Tsarichina Hole" by the Bulgarian military following the instructions of a psychic.

== Selected filmography ==
Year	Title	Director	Writer	Producer	Notes
2008	Family Therapy	Yes	Yes	Yes	Short film
2010	Emergency Landing	Yes	No	No	TV film
2012	Jump	Yes	Yes	Yes	Short film
2014	The Lesson	Yes	Yes	Yes	
2016	Glory	Yes	Yes	Yes	
2016	Stolen Life	Yes	No	No	TV series
2019	The Father	Yes	Yes	Yes	
2024	Triumph	Yes	Yes	Yes	
2026	Black Money for White Nights	Yes	Yes	Yes	
