= 54th Karlovy Vary International Film Festival =

Film festival edition

- Location: Karlovy Vary, Czech Republic
- Founded: 1946
- Awards: Crystal Globe: The Father by Kristina Grozeva and Petar Valchanov
- No. of films: 177
- Festival date: June 28–July 6, 2019
- Website: www.kviff.com/en/homepage

KVIFF chronology
- 55th 53rd

The 54th Karlovy Vary International Film Festival took place from June 28 to July 6, 2019, in Karlovy Vary, Czech Republic.

A total of 177 films were presented at the festival, including 34 world premieres, eight international and six European premieres. Bulgarian-Greek co-produced film, The Father won the Crystal Globe.

== Juries ==
The following were appointed as the juries at the 54th edition:

Grand Jury

- Štěpán Hulík (Czech Republic)
- Annemarie Jacir (Palestine)
- Sergei Loznitsa (Ukraine)
- Angeliki Papoulia (Greece)
- Charles Tesson (France)

FIPRESCI Jury

- Hugo Emmerzael (Netherlands)
- Viktor Palák (Czech Republic)
- Ana Sturm (Slovenia)

Europa Cinemas Label Jury

- Maarten Alexandra (Belgium)
- Carinzia Camilleri (Malta)
- Éva Demeter (Hungary)
- Denis Samardžić (Bosnia and Herzegovina)

East of the West

- Denis Ivanov (Ukraine)
- Juho Kuosmanen (Finland)
- Tomáš Pavlíček (Czech Republic)
- Ioanna Stais (Greece)
- Dagnė Vildžiūnaite (Lithuania)

The Ecumenical Jury

- Alyda Faber (Canada)
- Martin Horálek (Czech Republic)
- Peter Sheehan (Australia)

Documentary Films

- Andreas Horvath (Austria)
- Aline Schmid (Switzerland)
- Gastón Solnicki (Argentina)

FEDEORA Jury

- Maja Bogojević (Montenegro)
- Pavlina Jeleva (Bulgaria)
- Chiara Spagnoli Gabardi (Italy)

== Official selection ==
=== In competition ===
English title	Original title	Director(s)	Production countrie(s)
The August Virgin	La virgen de agosto	Jonás Trueba	Spain
The Father †	Bashtata	Kristina Grozeva, Petar Valchanov	Bulgaria, Greece
Half-Sister	Polsestra	Damjan Kozole	Slovenia, North Macedonia, Serbia
La Belle Indifference	Küçük şeyler	Kıvanç Sezer	Turkey
Lara ‡		Jan-Ole Gerster	Germany
Let There Be Light	Nech je svetlo	Marko Škop	Slovakia, Czech Republic
The Man of the Future	El hombre del futuro	Felipe Ríos	Chile, Argentina
Monsoon		Hong Khaou	United Kingdom
Mosaic Portrait	Ma sai ke shao nü	Zhai Yixiang	China
Ode to Nothing	Oda sa wala	Dwein Baltazar	Philippines
Patrick	De Patrick	Tim Mielants	Belgium
To the Stars		Martha Stephens	United States

Highlighted title and dagger (†) indicates Crystal Globe winner.
Highlighted title and double-dagger (‡) indicates Special Jury Prize winner.

=== Out of competition ===
English title	Original title	Director(s)	Production countrie(s)
Mystify: Michael Hutchence		Richard Lowenstein	Australia
Old-Timers	Staříci	Martin Dušek, Ondřej Provazník	Czech Republic, Slovakia
The True Adventures of Wolfboy		Martin Krejčí	United States

=== East of the West ===
English title	Original title	Director(s)	Production countrie(s)
Aga's House	Shpia e Agës	Lendita Zeqiraj	Kosovo, Croatia, France, Albania
Arrest	Arest	Andrei Cohn	Romania
The Bull †	Byk	Boris Akopov	Russia
A Certain Kind of Silence	Tiché doteky	Michal Hogenauer	Czech Republic, Netherlands, Latvia
Last Visit	Akher Ziyarah	Abdulmohsen Aldhabaan	Saudi Arabia
Mamonga		Stefan Malešević	Serbia, Bosnia and Herzegovina, Montenegro
My Thoughts Are Silent ‡	Moi dumki tikhi	Antonio Lukich	Ukraine
Nova Lituania		Karolis Kaupinis	Lithuania
Passed by Censor	Görülmüştür	Serhat Karaaslan	Turkey, Germany, France
Scandinavian Silence	Skandinaavia vaikus	Martti Helde	Estonia, France, Belgium
Silent Days	Hluché dni	Pavol Pekarčík	Slovakia, Czech Republic
Zizotek		Vardis Marinakis	Greece

Highlighted title and dagger (†) indicates East of the West winner.
Highlighted title and double-dagger (‡) indicates East of the West Special Jury Prize winner.

=== Documentary Films ===
English title	Original title	Director(s)	Production countrie(s)
17 Blocks		Davy Rothbart	United States
Confucian Dream ‡	Kongzi meng	Mijie Li	China
The Fading Village	Chun qu dong lai	Liu Feifang	China
Immortal †	Surematu	Ksenia Okhapkina	Estonia, Latvia
In the Arms of Morpheus	In de armen van Morpheus	Marc Schmidt	Netherlands
The Last Autumn	Síðasta haustið	Yrsa Roca Fannberg	Iceland
Over the Hills	Dálava	Martin Mareček	Czech Republic
Projectionist	Panorama	Yuriy Shylov	Ukraine, Poland
Spoon	Karote	Laila Pakalniņa	Latvia, Norway, Lithuania

Highlighted title and dagger (†) indicates Best Documentary Film winner.
Highlighted title and double-dagger (‡) indicates Documentary Special Jury Prize winner.

=== Another View ===
English title	Original title	Director(s)	Production countrie(s)
Apollo 11		Todd Douglas Miller	United States
Dafne		Federico Bondi	Italy
Die Kinder der Toten		Kelly Copper, Pavol Liška	Austria
A Dog Called Money		Seamus Murphy	Ireland, United Kingdom
Dogs Don't Wear Pants	Koirat eivät käytä housuja	Jukka-Pekka Valkeapää	Finland, Latvia
Fire Will Come	O que arde	Oliver Laxe	France, Luxembourg, Spain
Gold Is All There Is	Tutto l'oro che c'è	Andrea Caccia	Italy, Switzerland, France
In Fabric		Peter Strickland	United Kingdom
Introduzione all'oscuro		Gastón Solnicki	Argentina, Austria
Koko-di Koko-da		Johannes Nyholm	Sweden, Denmark
Lillian		Andreas Horvath	Austria
The Miracle of the Sargasso Sea	To thávma tis thálassas ton Sargassón	Syllas Tzoumerkas	Greece, Germany, Netherlands, Sweden
Monos		Alejandro Landes	Colombia, Argentina, Netherlands, Denmark, Sweden, Germany, Uruguay, United States
Monsters.	Monștri.	Marius Olteanu	Romania
Out of Tune	De frivillige	Frederikke Aspöck	Denmark
Real Love	C'est ça l'amour	Claire Burger	France
The Sharks	Los tiburones	Lucía Garibaldi	Uruguay, Argentina, Spain
Sick, Sick, Sick	Sem seu sangue	Alice Furtado	Brazil, France, Netherlands
Sons of Denmark	Danmarks sønner	Ulaa Salim	Denmark
Stitches	Šavovi	Miroslav Terzić	Serbia, Slovenia, Croatia, Bosnia and Herzegovina
Tlamess		Ala Eddine Slim	Tunisia, France
Tommaso		Abel Ferrara	Italy
The Trial	Process	Sergei Loznitsa	Netherlands
The Unknown Saint	Le miracle du Saint Inconnu	Alaa Eddine Aljem	Morocco, France, Qatar

=== Czech Films 2018–2019 ===
English title	Original title	Director(s)	Production countrie(s)
Another Chance	Začít znovu	Eva Tomanová	Czech Republic
Apart	Spolu sami	Diana Cam Van Nguyen	Czech Republic
Bloody Fairy Tales	Krvavé pohádky	Tereza Kovandová	Czech Republic
The Cage	Klec	Jiří Strach	Czech Republic
Daughter	Dcera	Daria Kashcheeva	Czech Republic
The Fishermen	Rybáři	Bára Anna Stejskalová	Czech Republic
Fruits of Clouds	Plody mraků	Kateřina Karhánková	Czech Republic
Golden Sting	Zlatý podraz	Radim Špaček	Czech Republic, Slovakia
Happy End		Jan Saska	Czech Republic
Hide N Seek	Schovka	Barbora Halířová	Czech Republic
Jan Palach		Robert Sedláček	Czech Republic, Slovakia
Karel, Me and You	Karel, já a ty	Bohdan Karásek	Czech Republic
The Kite	Pouštět draka	Martin Smatana	Czech Republic, Slovakia, Poland
Miss Hanoi		Zdeněk Viktora	Czech Republic, Slovakia
Off Sides	Letní hokej	Rozálie Kohoutová, Tomáš Bojar	Czech Republic
On the Roof	Na střeše	Jiří Mádl	Czech Republic, Slovakia
Woman's Day	Den žen	Evgeny Terpugov	Czech Republic

=== Future Frames: Generation NEXT of European Cinema ===
English title	Original title	Director(s)	Production countrie(s)
Beyond the North Winds: A Post Nuclear Reverie		Natalie Cubides-Brady	United Kingdom
Get Ready with Me		Jonatan Etzler	Sweden
He Was Called Chaos Bērziņš	Viņu sauca Haoss Bērziņš	Signe Birkova	Latvia
The Jarariju Sisters	Soeurs Jarariju	Jorge Cadena	Switzerland, Colombia
Kid		Gregor Valentovič	Slovakia
The Last Children of Paradise	Die letzten Kinder im Paradies	Anna Roller	Germany
Playing	Hra	Lun Sevnik	Czech Republic
Precious	Majkino zlato	Irfan Avdić	Bosnia and Herzegovina
A Siege	Ostrom	István Kovács	Hungary
Touch Me	Was bleibt	Eileen Byrne	Germany, Luxembourg

=== Horizons ===
English title	Original title	Director(s)	Production countrie(s)
Adam		Maryam Touzani	Morocco, France, Serbia
Amazing Grace		Alan Elliott, Sydney Pollack	United States
The Champion	Il Campione	Leonardo D'Agostini	Italy
The Cordillera of Dreams	La Cordillera de los sueños	Patricio Guzmán	Chile, France
The Dead Don't Die		Jim Jarmusch	United States, Sweden
Diego Maradona		Asif Kapadia	United Kingdom
Ghost Town Anthology	Répertoire des villes disparues	Denis Côté	Canada
The Invisible Life of Eurídice Gusmão	A vida invisível de Eurídice Gusmão	Karim Aïnouz	Brazil, Germany
Killing	Zan	Shinya Tsukamoto	Japan
Light of My Life		Casey Affleck	United States
Mid90s		Jonah Hill	United States
Oleg	Oļegs	Juris Kursietis	Latvia, Belgium, Lithuania, France
Our Time	Nuestro tiempo	Carlos Reygadas	Mexico, France, Germany, Denmark, Sweden
Papicha		Mounia Meddour	France, Algeria, Belgium, Qatar
Parasite	Gisaengchung	Bong Joon-ho	South Korea
Rojo		Benjamín Naishtat	Argentina, Belgium, Brazil, Germany, France, Switzerland
System Crasher	Systemsprenger	Nora Fingscheidt	Germany
The Traitor	Il traditore	Marco Bellocchio	Italy, France, Germany, Brazil
Varda by Agnès	Varda par Agnès	Agnès Varda	France
What You Gonna Do When the World's on Fire?		Roberto Minervini	Italy, United States, France
Wherever You Are	Ovunque proteggimi	Bonifacio Angius	Italy
A White, White Day	Hvítur, hvítur dagur	Hlynur Pálmason	Iceland, Denmark, Sweden
Yesterday		Danny Boyle	United Kingdom

=== Imagina ===
English title	Original title	Director(s)	Production countrie(s)
Communion Los Angeles		Adam R. Levine, Peter Bo Rappmund	United States
The Glamorous Boys of Tang	Tang chao chi li nan	Su Hui-Yu	Taiwan
The Grand Bizarre		Jodie Mack	United States
Heimat is a Space in Time	Heimat ist ein Raum aus Zeit	Thomas Heise	Germany, Austria
The Hidden City	La ciudad oculta	Victor Moreno	Spain, France, Germany
Interbeing		Martina Hoogland Ivanow	Sweden
Just Don't Think I'll Scream	Ne croyez surtout pas que je hurle	Frank Beauvais	France
Memento Stella		Takashi Makino	Japan, Hong Kong
Meteorite	Meteorito	Mauricio Sáenz	Mexico
Pareidolia		Nan Wang	Netherlands
Pwdre Ser: the rot of stars		Charlotte Pryce	United States
Walled Unwalled		Lawrence Abu Hamdan	Germany
Water and Clearing		Siegfried A. Fruhauf	Austria
tx-reverse		Virgil Widrich, Martin Reinhart	Austria

=== Liberated ===
English title	Original title	Director(s)	Production countrie(s)
The Flames of Royal Love	V žáru královské lásky	Jan Němec	Czechoslovakia
The Inheritance	Dědictví aneb Kurvahošigutntág	Věra Chytilová	Czechoslovakia
It's Better to Be Wealthy and Healthy Than Poor and Ill	Lepšie byť bohatý a zdravý ako chudobný a chorý	Juraj Jakubisko	Czechoslovakia
Let's All Sing Around	Pějme píseň dohola	Ondřej Trojan	Czechoslovakia
Requiem for a Maiden	Requiem pro panenku	Filip Renč	Czechoslovakia
Smoke	Kouř	Tomáš Vorel	Czechoslovakia
Time of the Servants	Čas sluhů	Irena Pavlásková	Czechoslovakia

=== Midnight Screenings ===
English title	Original title	Director(s)	Production countrie(s)
7 Reasons to Run Away (From Society)	7 raons per fugir (de la societat)	Esteve Soler, Gerard Quinto, David Torras	Spain
Alien		Ridley Scott	United States, United Kingdom
The Fog		John Carpenter	United States
The Lodge		Veronika Franz, Severin Fiala	United States, United Kingdom
The Matrix		The Wachowskis	United States
First Blood		Ted Kotcheff	United States
You Might Be the Killer		Brett Simmons	United States

=== Out of the Past ===
English title	Original title	Director(s)	Production countrie(s)
The Barnabáš Kos Case	Prípad Barnabáš Kos	Peter Solan	Czechoslovakia
Be Prepared!	Buď připraven!	Svatopluk Innemann	Czechoslovakia
The Cremator	Spalovač mrtvol	Juraj Herz	Czechoslovakia
Detour		Edgar G. Ulmer	United States
Husbands		John Cassavetes	United States
Memory: The Origins of Alien		Alexandre O. Philippe	United States
The Other Side of the Wind		Orson Welles	United States, France, Iran
Paths of Glory		Stanley Kubrick	United States
Sátántangó		Béla Tarr	Hungary, Switzerland, Germany
What She Said: The Art of Pauline Kael		Rob Garver	United States
The White Caravan	Tetri karavani	Eldar Shengelaia, Tamaz Meliava	Georgia

=== People Next Door ===
English title	Original title	Director(s)	Production countrie(s)
Carte Blanche		Jacek Lusiński	Poland
Don't Worry, He Won't Get Far on Foot		Gus Van Sant	United States
Marie's Story	Marie Heurtin	Jean-Pierre Améris	France
Mimi & Lisa: Christmas Light Mystery	Mimi & Líza: Záhada vánočního světla	Katarína Kerekesová, Ivana Šebestová	Slovakia, Czech Republic
Rolling to You	Tout le monde debout	Franck Dubosc	France, Belgium
Wonderstruck		Todd Haynes	United States

=== Prague Short Film Festival Presents ===
English title	Original title	Director(s)	Production countrie(s)
Make Aliens Dance		Sebastien Petretti	Belgium, United Kingdom
Reconstruction	Rekonstrukce	Jiří Havlíček, Ondřej Novák	Czech Republic
A Stone Slowly Falls	En sten faller langsomt ned	Kerren Lumer-Klabbers	Norway
Sugar and Salt	Cukr a sůl	Adam Martinec	Czech Republic
Tremors	Drżenia	Dawid Bodzak	Poland

=== Special Events ===
English title	Original title	Director(s)	Production countrie(s)
After the Wedding		Bart Freundlich	United States
The End of Berhof	Zánik samoty Berhof	Jiří Svoboda	Czechoslovakia, Poland
Forman vs. Forman		Helena Třeštíková, Jakub Hejna	Czech Republic, France
Jiří Suchý: Tackling Life with Ease	Jiří Suchý: Lehce s životem se prát	Olga Sommerová	Czech Republic
Late Night		Nisha Ganatra	United States
Learning to Drive		Isabel Coixet	United Kingdom, United States
The Myth of Fingerprints		Bart Freundlich	United States
Pavarotti		Ron Howard	United States
The Sleepers	Bez vědomí	Ivan Zachariáš	Czech Republic
Spider-Man: Far From Home		Jon Watts	United States

=== Tribute to Youssef Chahine ===
This segment was presented as a tribute to Egyptian filmmaker Youssef Chahine.

English title	Original title	Year	Production countrie(s)
Alexandria... Why?	Eskanderija... lih?	1978	Egypt
The Blazing Sun	Siraa fil wadi	1954	Egypt
Cairo Station	Bab el-Hadid	1958	Egypt
Daddy Amin	Baba Amin	1950	Egypt
Dawn of a New Day	Fagr yom gedid	1964	Egypt, USSR
The Devil of the Desert	Shaytan al-sahraa	1954	Egypt
Farewell My Love	Wadda't hubbak	1957	Egypt
My One and Only Love	Enta habibi	1957	Egypt
The Return of the Prodigal Son	Awdat al-ibn al dal	1976	Egypt, Algeria
Saladin	Al-Naser Salah al-Din	1963	Egypt
The Sixth Day	Al-yom al-sadis	1986	Egypt, France

== Awards ==
The following awards were presented at the 54th edition:

=== Official selection awards ===
Grand Prix – Crystal Globe

The Father by Kristina Grozeva and Petar Valchanov

Special Jury Prize

Lara by Jan-Ole Gerster

Best Director

Tim Mielants for Patrick

Best Actress

Corinna Harfouch for Lara

Best Actor

Milan Ondrík for Let There Be Light

Special Jury Mention

The August Virgin by Jonás Trueba
Antonia Giesen for The Man of the Future

=== Other statutory awards ===
East of the West Grand Prix

The Bull by Boris Akopov

East of the West Special Jury Prize

My Thoughts Are Silent by Antonio Lukich

Grand Prix for Best Documentary Film

Immortal by Ksenia Okhapkina

Documentary Special Jury Prize

Confucian Dream by Mijie Li

Právo Audience Award

Jiří Suchý: Tackling Life with Ease by Olga Sommerová

Crystal Globe for Outstanding Artistic Contribution to World Cinema

Julianne Moore (United States)
Patricia Clarkson (United States)

Festival President's Award for Contribution to Czech Cinematography

Vladimír Smutný (Czech Republic)

=== Non-statutory awards ===
Award of International Film Critics (FIPRESCI)

The August Virgin by Jonás Trueba

The Ecumenical Jury Award

Lara by Jan-Ole Gerster

Ecumenical Jury Commendation

Let There Be Light by Marko Škop

FEDEORA Award

Passed by Censor by Serhat Karaaslan

FEDEORA Jury Special Mention

Aga's House by Lendita Zeqiraj

Europa Cinemas Label Award

Scandinavian Silence by Martti Helde
