= Ukrainian cinema since independence =

History of Ukrainian cinema since 1991

Ukrainian cinema of the Independence era is characterized by the collapse of the film industry in the 1990s and attempts to rebuild it in the 2000s and 2010s since the Declaration of Independence of Ukraine after the independence referendum of 1991. Although the centralized film industry was in decline, independent film studios, distribution companies and a network of cinemas were developing. In the 2010s, the number of short films in Ukraine was growing rapidly due to the development of digital technologies and reduced production costs. Although the film industry was making losses at that time, a number of Ukrainian films were successful at international film festivals.

== State policy of Ukraine in the field of cinematography ==
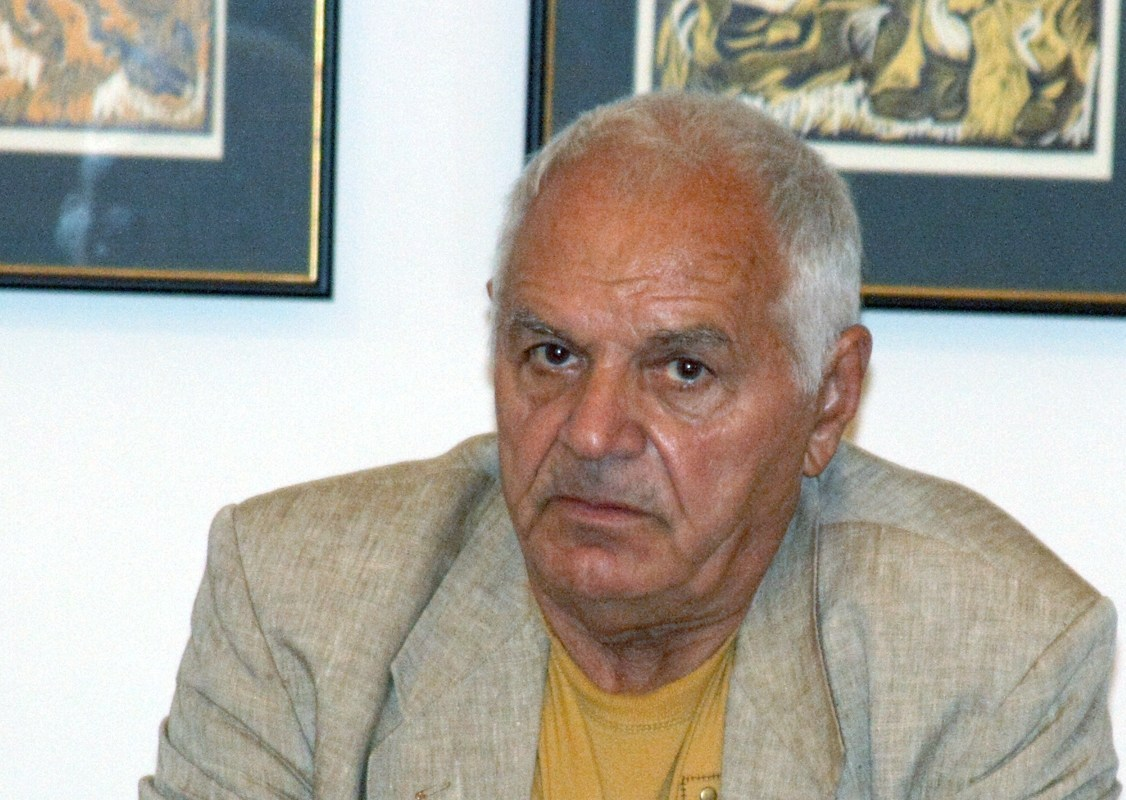
Yuri Ilyenko

On 5 August 1988, the Verkhovna Rada of the Ukrainian SSR liquidated the State Committee for Cinematography, leaving Ukraine without a state body responsible for cinema development. After Ukraine gained its independence, Yuriy Illyenko tried to restore such a structure by creating the State Fund of Ukrainian Cinematography in August 1991, which functioned until May 1993. Derzhkino resumed its activities only in 2005 following the decree of the Cabinet of Ministers of Ukraine of 22 November 2005. Hanna Chmil became the first head of the new Derzhkino.

Regulation of the state policy of Ukraine on cinema was approved on 13 January 1998, when the Verkhovna Rada of Ukraine adopted the Law of Ukraine "On Cinematography". In March 2017, a new Law of Ukraine "On the State support for the cinematography in Ukraine" was adopted, according to which Ukrainian documentaries, educational, animated, children's, auteur and debut films could apply for full state funding of production.

== History of the Ukrainian cinematography of the Independence era ==
=== Ukrainian cinema of the 1990s ===
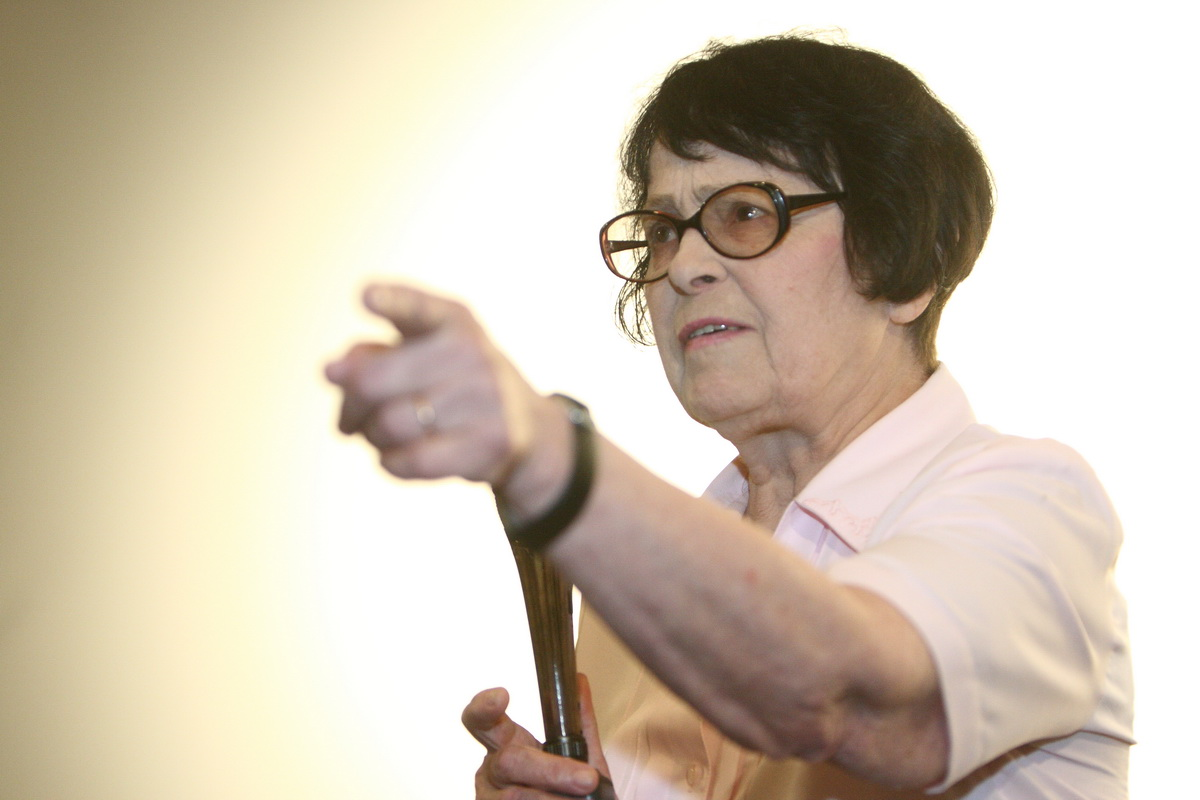
Kira Muratova

In the 1990s, due to the collapse of the Soviet Union and the economic crisis, Ukrainian cinema began to decline.

The number of spectators in cinemas decreased from 552 million a year in 1990 to 5 million – in 1999. At the same time, the audience of TV channels was gradually growing. The number of demonstrators decreased from 27 in 1990 to 8 in 1999. The number of feature films shot in Ukraine per year decreased from 45 in 1992 to 4 in 2000. Out of the 136 films produced in Ukraine in the 1990s, 82 were made in Russian.

In the 1990s, efforts to commercialize Ukrainian cinema were made. Film production was often commissioned and sponsored by business entities. This fact affected the content of films and led them to have more of an entertaining character. Crime dramas, adventure and erotic films were gaining popularity.

The most notable directors of the 1990s were Radomyr Vasylevsky, Mykola Zasieiev-Rudenko, Anatoliy Ivanov, Hryhoriy Kokhan, Oleksandr Muratov, Borys Nebiieridze, Alexander Polynnikov, and Dmytro Tomashpolskyi. Kira Muratova produced as many as five films in the 1990s.

In the early 1990s, TV series were actively filmed for Ukrainian television. Roksolana (Ukrainian: «Роксолана»), directed by Borys Nebiieridze, Love Island (Ukrainian: «Острів любові», tr.: Ostriv Liubovi), directed by Oleh Biyma were among the most popular ones.

=== Ukrainian cinema of the 2000s ===
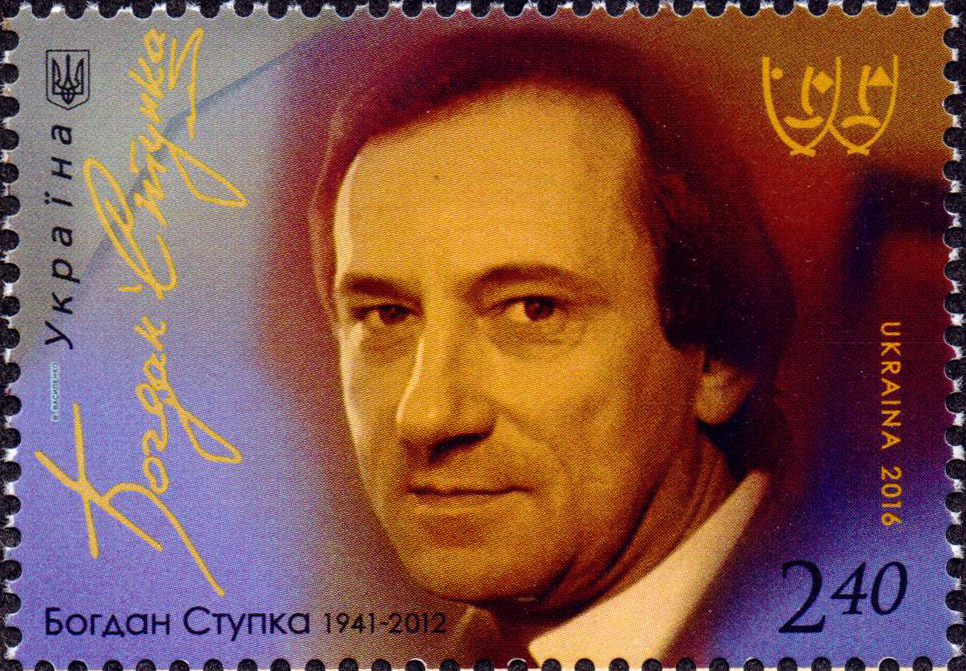
Bohdan Stupka

At the turn of the 2000s, the film With Fire and Sword (Polish: «Ogniem i mieczem») by Polish director Jerzy Hoffman, in which Ukrainian actor Bohdan Stupka played the role of Hetman Bohdan Khmelnytsky, was a huge success. Bohdan Stupka becomes the main hetman of the Ukrainian screen – he also had roles in the historical TV series Black Council (Ukrainian: «Чорна рада») by Mykola Zasieiev-Rudenko (2000) and Yurii Illienko's film A Prayer for Hetman Mazepa (Ukrainian: «Молитва за гетьмана Мазепу») (2001).

Historical themes have also become leading in the work of director Oles Yanchuk. During the 1990s and the first half of the 2000s, he made such films as Famine-33 (Ukrainian: «Голод-33») (1991) about the tragic fate of a Ukrainian family during the Holodomor, Assassination. An Autumn Murder in Munich (Ukrainian: «Атентат –Осіннє вбивство у Мюнхені») (1995), The Undefeated (Ukrainian: «Нескорений») (2000) and The Company of Heroes / The Iron Hundred (Ukrainian: «Залізна сотня») (2004). They were an attempt to convey to the viewer a personal belief of the phenomenon and combat of the Ukrainian Insurgent Army from the eyes of a committed director, presenting an ideological narrative according to Soviet methods.

Since 2004, several films have been made about the Orange Revolution. That time was covered in several films, in particular: The Orange Sky (Ukrainian: «Помаранчеве небо») (2006, directed by Oleksandr Kyryenko), Stop Revolution/Prorvemos! (Ukrainian: «Прорвемось!») (2006, directed by Ivan Kravchyshyn), Orangelove (Ukrainian: «Оранжлав») (2006, by Alan Badoev).

Among the films with the largest budgets of the early 2000s is Sappho (Ukrainian: Сафо) ($ 1.95 million).

=== Ukrainian cinema of the 2010s ===
A gradual increase in film production in Ukraine was in the 2010s. Due to the development of technology, cost reduction and the audience demand for domestic film products (especially after the Revolution of Dignity), the number of films significantly increases. A new generation of filmmakers has come to Ukrainian cinema. The collective projects of Ukrainian directors are appearing: Assholes. Arabesques (Ukrainian: «Мудаки. Арабески»), Ukraine, Goodbye! (Ukrainian: «Україно, goodbye»), Babylon '13 (Ukrainian: «Вавилон’13»).

Ukrainian film festivals, in particular "Molodist", Odesa International Film Festival, DocuDays UA, Wiz-Art, "Open Night", and "86" are becoming important participants in the cinematographic process.

Ukrainian film distribution is experiencing increasing success. The most successful films in Ukrainian cinemas are Forbidden empire/Viy (Ukrainian: «Вій») (box office in Ukraine $ 4.9 million), Love in the Big City 3 (Ukrainian: «Кохання у великому місті 3») ($3.1 million), 8 Best Dates (Ukrainian: «8 кращих побачень») ($3.1 million).

An important event for the functioning of Ukrainian cinema was the new Law "On the State Support for Cinematography" adopted in March 2017, according to which Ukrainian documentaries, educational, animated, children's, auteur and debut films could apply for full state funding for production.

=== Number of Ukrainian releases in film distribution ===
The statistics of Ukrainian full-length movies (feature and animated) releases looks like this:

- 2006 — 4
- 2007 — 5
- 2008 — 5
- 2009 — 2
- 2010 — 0
- 2011 — 1
- 2012 — 6
- 2013 — 12
- 2014 — 16
- 2015 — 24
- 2016 — 30
- 2017 — 34
- 2018 — 35
- 2019 – 33

== Success of Ukrainian cinema at international film festivals ==
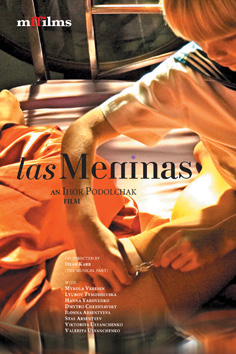
Las Meninas poster

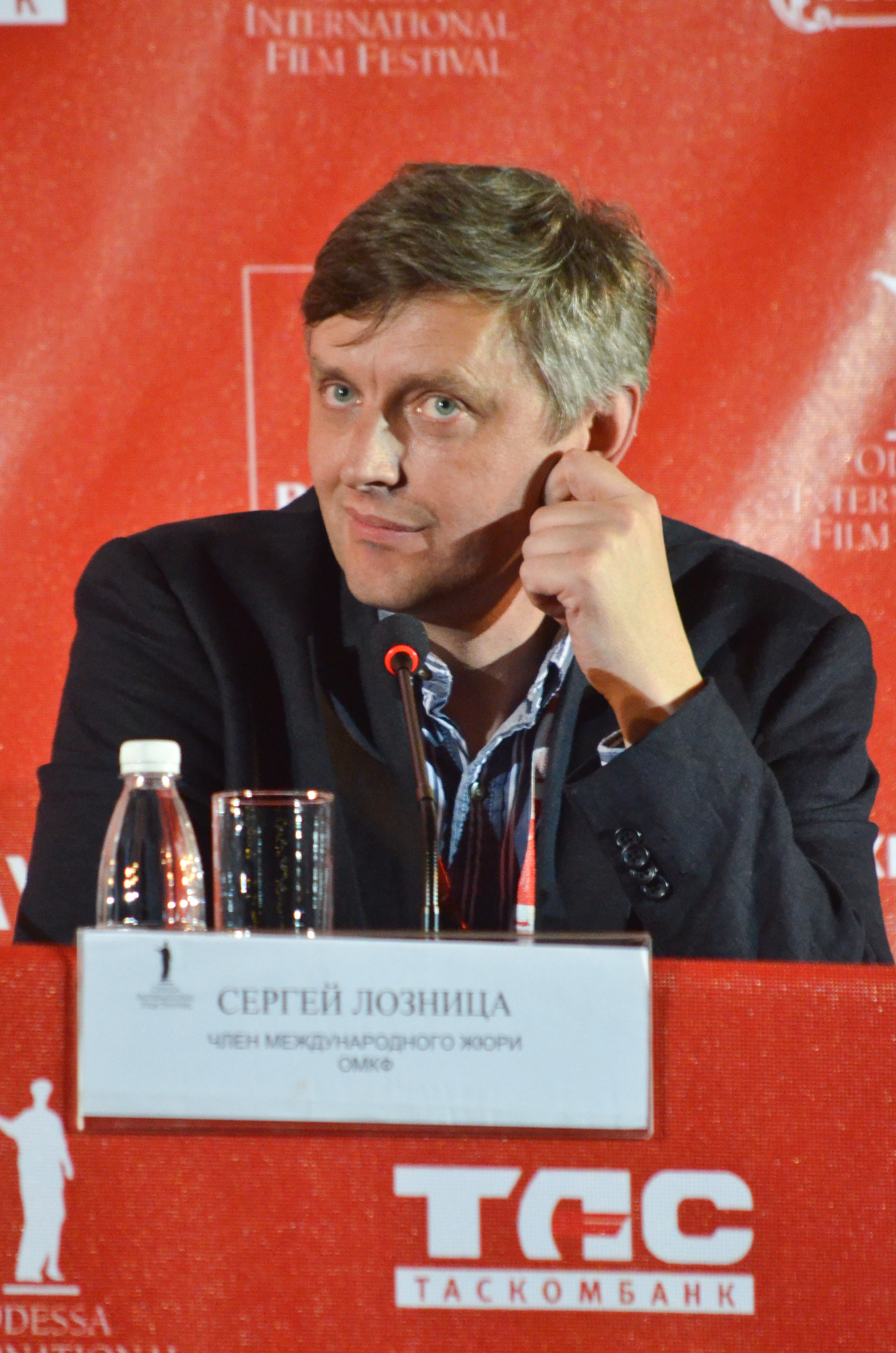
Sergei Loznitsa at the Odesa International Film Festival 2014

In 2001 Taras Tomenko won the Panorama section award of the Berlin Film Festival.

In 2003 in the Main Competition of the same Berlinale (Berlin film festival), the short film Tram No.9 (Ukrainian: «Йшов трамвай 9») by Ukrainian animator Stepan Koval was awarded with Silver Bear.

In 2005 the film Wayfarers (Ukrainian: «Подорожні») by the young Ukrainian director Ihor Strembitsky received the Palme d’Or of the Cannes Film Festival.

In 2008 Ihor Podolchak made his debut at the Rotterdam International Film Festival with the film Las Meninas. Later, the film participated in 27 international film festivals, 10 competition programs and the official selections. In 2013 his second full-length movie Delirium was released. Both of Podolchak's films are considered to be vivid examples of arthouse in Ukrainian cinema by critics.

In 2011 Maryna Vroda received the Palme d’Or at the Cannes Film Festival for the short film Cross-Country Run (Ukrainian: «Кросс»).

In 2009 Myroslav Slaboshpytskyi's second short film, Diagnosis (Ukrainian: «Діагноз»), was shortlisted for the Berlin Film Festival. In February 2010, Slaboshpytskyi's new short work Deafness (Ukrainian: «Глухота») enters the competition program of the Berlinale (Berlin Film Festival).

In 2012, Myroslav Slaboshpytskyi's 23-minute film Nuclear Waste (Ukrainian: «Ядерні відходи»), shot as part of the Ukraine, Goodbye! project (Ukrainian: «Україно, goodbye!»), won the Silver Leopard in the Leopard of the Future competition program at the Locarno International Film Festival.

In 2014 Myroslav Slaboshpytskyi's feature film The Tribe (Ukrainian: «Плем'я») took part in the Cannes Film Festival Critics' Week competition and received three awards at once – the Gan Foundation Prize, the Discovery Prize and the Grand Prix.

In 2017 in the Generation 14plus parallel section of the Berlinale the film School No. 3 (Ukrainian: «Школа №3») directed by Georg Geno and Lisa Smith won the Grand Prix. And Slovak director Peter Bebiak received the Award for Best Director for the Ukrainian-Slovak film Border (Ukrainian: «Межа») at the Karlovy Vary Film Festival.

In 2018 Serhiy Loznytsia's Donbas (Ukrainian: «Донбасс») won the Prize for the best directorial work in the Cannes Film Festival's special program.

In 2019, Antonio Lukich's film My Thoughts are Silent (Ukrainian: «Мої думки тихі») won the Special Jury Prize at the 54th Karlovy Vary International Film Festival.

In 2020 the full-length documentary The Earth Is Blue as an Orange (Ukrainian: «Земля блакитна, ніби апельсин») directed by Iryna Tsilyk received the award for best director at the Sundance Film Festival.

== Filmography of Ukrainian cinema of the Independence era ==
=== Filmography of Ukrainian full-length feature films of the 1990s–2010s ===
Name	Director	Year	Name of the Film Studio
1991
Afghan Афганець	Volodymyr Mazur	1991	Dovzhenko Film Studio Kotra Balt Київська кіностудія художніх фільмів ім. О. П. Довженка, Котра Балт
The Bay of Death Bukhta smerti Бухта смерті	Hryhoriy Kokhan, Tymofiy Levchuk	1991	Dovzhenko Film Studio Skif SPA (Scientific Production Association) (Russia) Київська кіностудія художніх фільмів ім. О. П. Довженка, НВО «Скиф» (Росія)
Rear Window Vikno navproty Вікно навпроти	Eduard Dmytriyev	1991	Ukrtelefilm Укртелефільм
Le siècle des lumières (The age of enlightenment) Vik prosvity Вік просвіти	Humberto Solás	1991	Yalta-Film Instituto Cubano del Arte e Industrias Cinematográficos (ICAIC) Société Française de Production (SFP) Ялта-фільм, ІКАІК (Куба), СФП (Франція)
Loyal Ruslan, A Story of a Guard Dog Вірний Руслан (Історія вартового собаки) Virnyi Ruslan, Istoriya vartovoho sobaky	Volodymyr Khmelnytskyi	1991	Fest Zemlya CPA(Creative Production Association) Ukrainian Cultural Foundation Swea Sov (Sweden) ВТО «Фест-Земля», Український фонд культури, СВЕА-СОВ (Швеція)
Resurrection Воскресіння мертвих, Voskresinnya mertvykh	Dmytro Bohdanov	1991	Kyivnaukfilm
Famine – 33 Holod – 33 Голод — 33	Oles Yanchuk	1991	Dovzhenko Film Studio Fest Zemlya CPA Lisbank Zakarpatskyi Commercial Bank Київська кіностудія художніх фільмів ім. О. П. Довженка, Закарпатський комерційний банк «Лісбанк», ВТО «Фест-Земля»
Lord's fish Hospodnya ryba Господня риба	Viacheslav Kolehaiev	1991	Odesa Film Studio Odisey CPA Одеська кіностудія художніх фільмів, ВТО «Одіссей»
Sin Hrikh Гріх	Oleh Biima	1991	Ukrtelefilm
Deserter Dezertir Дезертир	Vadym Kostromenko	1991	Odesa Film Studio Odisey CPA Одеська кіностудія художніх фільмів, ВТО «Одіссей»
Joker Джокер	Yurii Kuzmenko Yurii Pustovyi	1991	Odesa Film Studio Flora Academy of Sciences of the USSR of Tsedisi «Флора» (Одеса), «Ника» ЦЕДИСИ АН СССР
Road to Paradise Doroha v Paradiz Дорога в Парадіз	Yurii Belyanskyi	1991	Odesa Film Studio Primodesa-Film CPA Одеська кіновідеостудія, «Прімодеса-фільм»
Psychic Екстрасенс Ekstrasens	Gennadi Glagolev	1991	Odesa Film Studio Primodesa-Film CPA Одеська кіновідеостудія, «Прімодеса-фільм»
Woman for all Жінка для всіх Zhinka dlya vsikh	Anatoliy Mateshko	1991	Dovzhenko Film Studio Pіramіda-Menatep CPA (Russia) Київська кіностудія художніх фільмів ім. О. П. Довженка, ВТО «Пирамида-Менатеп» (Росія)
Who belongs in prison Za kym vyaznytsia plache За ким в'язниця плаче	Heorhiy Kevorkov	1991	Odesa Film Studio Arcadia CPA Одеська кіновідеостудія нового типу, ВТО «Аркадія»
In the time of Guyhan Bey За часів Гайхан-бея Za chasiv Huykhan-beya	Yuriy Suyarko	1991	Ukrtelefilm
From the life of Ostap Vyshnia Iz zhuttya Ostapa Vyshni Із житія Остапа Вишні	Yaroslav Lanchak	1991	Dovzhenko Film Studio Soyuztelefilm CPA (Russia) Київська кіностудія художніх фільмів ім. О. П. Довженка, ТВО «Союзтелефільм» (Росія) (телефільм)
And to Hell with Us! I chort z namy І чорт з нами	Oleksandr Pavlovskyi	1991	Odesa Film Studio Sovkhalizh Joint Venture Одеська кіновідеостудія, СП «Совхаліж»
Captain Crocus and the mystery of the little conspirators Kapitan Krokus I Tayemnytsya malen’kykh zmovnykiv Капітан Крокус і Таємниця маленьких змовників	Volodymyr Onyshchenko	1991	Dovzhenko Film Studio Slavutych Film Studio All-Union Centre for Cinema and TV for Children and Youth Всесоюзний центр кіно і телебачення для дітей та юнацтва, «Славутич», Київська кіностудія художніх фільмів ім. О. П. Довженка
Carpathian Gold Karpats’ke zoloto Карпатське золото	Viktor Zhyvolub	1991	Volia-XX Film Studio (Kyiv) «Воля-ХХ» (Київ)
Kitenka Kytsen’ka Киценька	Viktor Vasylenko	1991	Ukrtelefilm Lybid CPA Укртелефільм, ВТО «Либідь»
Cossacks are coming Kozaky idut’ Козаки йдуть	Serhiy Omelchuk	1991	Ros National Cultural Production Centre Kyiv Scientific and Production Association Tsukroburiaky All-Ukrainian Union Svema Національно-культурний виробничий центр «Рось», Київське НВО «Цукробуряки», Шосткінське ВО «Свема»
Blood for Blood Krov za krov Кров за кров	Yurіy Kolcheiev	1991	Odesa CPA Mosfilm ВТО «Одеса», «Мосфільм»
Cruise, or the divorce trip Kruyiz, abo Podorozh rozluchennya Круїз, або подорож розлучення	Oksana Bairak	1991	NEP-Film (Kyiv) «НЕП-фільм» (Київ)
Courier to the east Kuryer na ckhid Кур'єр на схід	Oleksandr Basaty Murat Dzhusoity Олександр Басати, Мурат Джусойти	1991	FB-33 Film Studio «ФБ-33» (Одеса)
Love. A deadly game... Lyubov. Smertel’na hra Любов. Смертельна гра...	Serhіy Ashkenazі Сергій Ашкеназі	1991	Odesa Film Studio Одеська кіновідеостудія нового типу
A man in a green kimono Lyudyna v zelenomu kimono Людина в зеленому кімоно	Tamerlan Karhaiev Borys Kantemyrov Тамерлан Каргаєв, Борис Кантемиров	1991	Odesa Film Studio Skif-Ippon Sports Cooperative Одеська кіновідеостудія, Спортивний кооператив «Скіф-Іппон»
Honeymoon Medovyi misiats Медовий місяць	Serhii Ivanov Сергій Іванов	1991	Panorama International Youth Arts Club (Kyiv) Інтернаціональний молодіжний клуб мистецтв «Панорама» (Київ)
Sweetheart you are mine Malen’kyi ty miy Миленький ти мій..	Tymur Zoloiev Тимур Золоєв	1991	ASK Branch of the Joint Venture in Kyiv Філіал СП «АСК» в місті Києві, МП «Бізнес-АСК» (Київ)
Myna Mazaylo Мина Мазайло	Serhii Proskurnya Сергій Проскурня	1991	Ukrtelefilm Укртелефільм
Sea wolf Morskyi vovk Морський вовк	Іhor Apasyan Ігор Апасян	1991	Odisey CPA ВТО «Одіссей»
My neighbor Moya susidka Моя сусідка	Klym Chymidov Клим Чимідов	1991	Odesa Film Studio Одеська кіностудія художніх фільмів
The bells did not play for us when we were dying Nam dzvony ne hraly koly my vmyraly Нам дзвони не грали, коли ми вмирали	Mykola Fediuk Микола Федюк	1991	Halychyna Film Studio Галичина-фільм
People's Malachi Narodnyi Malakhiy Народний Малахій	Rostyslav Synko Ростислав Синько	1991	Ukrtelefilm Укртелефільм
Unidentified person Nevstanovlena osoba Невстановлена особа	Nataliya Zbandut Наталія Збандут	1991	Odesa Film Studio Одеська кіновідеостудія
Niagara Niahara Ніагара	Oleksandr Vizyr Олександр Візир	1991	Dovzhenko Film Studio Київська кіностудія художніх фільмів ім. О. П. Довженка
Nude in a hat Oholena v kapelyusi Оголена в капелюсі	Alexandr Polynnikov Алєксандр Полинніков	1991	Aura Film Studio (Odesa) Студія «Аура» (Одеса)
Captain Blood: His Odyssey Odisseya kapitana Blada Одіссея капітана Блада	Andriy Prachenko Андрій Праченко	1991	Yalta-Film Société Française de Production (SFP) Ялта-фільм, СФП (Франція), Кіностудія імені Горького (Росія)
Personal weapons Osobysta zbroya Особиста зброя	Anatoliy Bukovskyi Анатолій Буковський	1991	Dovzhenko Film Studio Soyuztelefilm CPA Gorky Film Studio (Russia) Київська кіностудія художніх фільмів ім. О. П. Довженка, Союзтелефільм (Росія)
The last bunker Ostanniy bunker Останній бункер	Vadym Illienko Вадим Іллєнко	1991	Fest Zemlya CPA (Kyiv) ВТО «Фест-Земля» (Київ)
Guardian Okhoronets Охоронець	Anatoliy Ivanov Анатолій Іванов	1991	Dovzhenko Film Studio Pіramіda-Menatep CPA(Russia) Київська кіностудія художніх фільмів ім. О. П. Довженка, ВТО «Пирамида-Менатеп» (Росія)
Pavlo Polubotok Павло Полуботок	Vіktor Rabochek В. Рабочек	1991	Ukrtelefilm Укртелефільм
Exiled Pamyatai/Izhoi Пам'ятай / Ізгой	Volodymyr Saveliev Володимир Савельєв	1992	Fest Zemlya CPA Filmkunst CCC (Germany) ВТО «Фест-Земля», «ССС-Фільмкунст» (Німеччина)
Gentlemen artists Panove artysty Панове артисти	Vasyl Panin Василь Панін	1991	Yalta-Film Americus Enterprise Ялта-фільм, Амерікус Ентерпрайзіс (США)
Birthday gift Podarunok na imemyny Подарунок на іменини	Leonid Osyka Леонід Осика	1991	Dovzhenko Film Studio Київська кіностудія художніх фільмів ім. О. П. Довженка
Poltergeist-90 Polterheist – 90 Полтергейст-90	Vladyslav Semernin Borys Zahriazhskyi Владислав Сємєрнін, Борис Загряжський	1991	Odesa CPA Strannik LLC (Odesa) ТО «Одеса», «Странник» (Одеса)
Postscriptum Postskryptum Постскриптум	Valentyn Voiko Валентин Войко	1991	Dovzhenko Film Studio Київська кіностудія художніх фільмів ім. О. П. Довженка
A kiss from afar Potsilunok zdalya Поцілунок здаля	A. Karpynov А. Карпинов	1991	XXI vik Film Studio «Кіностудія XXI»
Waking up in Shanghai Prokynutysya u Shankhai Прокинутися у Шанхаї	Mykola Siedniev Микола Сєднєв	1991	Flora Film Studio Debyut Creative Association (CA) (Odesa) «Флора», ТО «Дебют» (Одеса), ЮЗО ЦЕДІСІ АН СРСР
Breakthrough Proryv Прорив	Yevhen Sherstobytov Євген Шерстобитов	1991	Kinematohrafist Film Studio (Kyiv) «Кінематографіст» (Київ)
Desert Pustelya Пустеля	Mykhaylo Kats Михайло Кац	1991	Odisey CA Dyahilev-Tsentr International Charitable Foundation Soyuztelefilm CPA ТО «Одіссей» (Одеса), «Дягилев-Центр» (Росія), «Держтелефильм СРСР»
Seven Days with a Russian Beauty Sim dniv z rosiys’koyu krasuneyu Сім днів з російською красунею	Yurіi Volodarskyi Heorhіy Delіiev Юрій Володарський, Георгій Делієв	1991	Golden Duke Audience Center (Odesa) Глядацький центр «Золотий Дюк» (Одеса)
Sniper Snayper Снайпер	Andrіi Benkendorf Бенкендорф Андрій Олександрович	1991	Dovzhenko Film Studio Skif SPA (Russia) Київська кіностудія художніх фільмів ім. О. П. Довженка, НВО «Скиф» (Росія)
Tango of death Tanho smerti Танго смерті	Oleksandr Muratov Олександр Муратов	1991	Ros National Cultural Production Centre Національно-культурний виробничий центр «Рось»
Hold on, Cossack! Trymaysya kozache! Тримайся, козаче!	Vіktor Semanіv Віктор Семанів	1991	Dovzhenko Film Studio Київська кіностудія художніх фільмів ім. О. П. Довженка
Murder in Sunshine-Menor Vbyvstvo v Sanshayn-Menor Вбивство в Саншайн-Менор	Boris Nebіierіdze Борис Небієрідзе	1991	Yalta-Film Kinkom Film Studio (Russia) Ялта-фільм, «Кинком» (Росія)
Kill the Jackal Ubyty shakala Убити «Шакала»	Hrihorіy Kokhan Григорій Кохан	1991	Kyiv- ASK Film Studio Кіностудія «Київ — АСК»
Attention, Witches! Uvaha, vid’my! Увага, відьми!	Oleksandr Amelіn Олександр Амелін	1991	Odesa Film Studio Odissey CPA Одеська кіностудія художніх фільмів, ВТО «Одіссей»
Fandango for a monkey Fandanho dlia mavpochky Фанданго для мавпочки	Oleksandr Burko Олександр Бурко	1991	Odesa CPA ВТО «Одеса»
The Clearing Feofaniya, yaka malyuye smert’ Феофанія, яка малює смерть	Vladimir Alienikov Владімір Алєніков	1991	Odesa Film Studio Babylon Productions Kodak Films «Вавилон», «Кодак-філмз» (США), Одеська кіностудія художніх фільмів
The price of the head Tsina holovy Ціна голови	Mykola Ilyinskyi Микола Ільїнський	1991	Dovzhenko Film Studio Skif SPA (Russia) Київська кіностудія художніх фільмів ім. О. П. Довженка, НВО «Скиф» (Росія)
Werewolf hour Chas perevertnya Час перевертня	Ihor Shevchenko Ігор Шевченко	1991	TIRS Film Production Company (Odesa) Кінофірма «ТІРС» (Одеса)
A miracle in the land of oblivion Chudo v krayu zabuttya Чудо в краю забуття	Natalya Motuzko Наталя Мотузко	1991	Odesa Film Studio Одеська кіновідеостудія
Damn Drunkard Chortiv pyanytsya Чортів п'яниця	Yuriy Manusov Юрій Манусов	1991	Hraal CPA ВТО «Грааль»
1992
American boy Ameryken boy Америкен бой	Borys Kvashniov Борис Квашньов	1992	Ukrtelefilm Lybid CPA Univeks Limited Liability Company Укртелефільм, ВТО «Либідь», «Унівекс»
Bolero, or Provincial Melodrama Bolero, abo provintsiyna melodrama Болеро, або провінційна мелодрама	Mykhaylo Bezchasnov Михайло Безчастнов	1992	Dzerkalo Company (Odesa) Фірма «Дзеркало» (Одеса)
Abduction of Europe Vykradennya Yevropy Викрадення Європи	Murat Dzhusoyti (Dzhusoyev) Мурат Джусоєв	1992	Odesa CA (Odesa) ТО «Одеса» (Одеса)
Cherry nights Vyshnevi nochi Вишневі ночі	Arkadiy Mykulskyi Аркадій Микульський	1992	Ros National Cultural Production Centre Національно-культурний виробничий центр «Рось»
The higher truth of the bomber Alexei /Night of the Sinner Byshcha istyna bombista Oleksiya/Nich hrishnykiv Вища істина бомбіста Олексія / Ніч грішників	Dmytro Kostromenko Дмитро Костроменко	1992	Odisey CPA(Odesa) ВТО «Одісей» (Одеса)
Wedding with death Vinchannya zi smertyu Вінчання зі смертю	Mykola Mashchenko Микола Мащенко	1992	Dovzhenko Film Studio Київська кіностудія художніх фільмів ім. О. П. Довженка, Студія «ХХI вік»
That Part of Heaven... V tiy tsaryni nebes... В тій царині небес...	Ihor Chernytskyi Ігор Черницький	1992	Slavuta Film Production Company (Kyiv), with the participation of the Volgograd Tractor Plant Кінофірма «Славута» (Київ), за участі Волгоградського тракторного заводу
In the mist V tumani В тумані	Serhii Linkov Сергій Лінков	1992	Odesa Film Studio Одеська кіностудія художніх фільмів
The voice of the grass Holos travy Голос трави	Natalya Motuzko Наталя Мотузко	1992	Odesa Film Studio Одеська кіностудія художніх фільмів
Lord, forgive us sinners! Hospody, prosty nas hrishnykh! Господи, прости нас грішних!	Artur Voitetskyi Артур Войтецький	1992	Dovzhenko Film Studio Київська кіностудія художніх фільмів ім. О. П. Довженка
The game is serious Гра всерйоз	Anatoliy Ivanov Анатолій Іванов	1992	Dovzhenko Film Studio Iren World Trade Center (Russia) Київська кіностудія художніх фільмів ім. О. П. Довженка, ВТЦ «Ирен» (Росія)
Black Moon Degree Hradus chornoho misyatsya Градус чорного Місяця	Natalia Kirakozova Наталія Кіракозова	1992	Dovzhenko Film Studio Debyut CA (Odesa) Київська кіностудія художніх фільмів ім. О. П. Довженка, ТО «Дебют»
Storm Over Russia Hroza nad Russyu Гроза над Руссю	Oleksii Saltykov Олексій Салтиков	1992	Hlasnist-5 Producer's Cooperative (Kharkiv) Виробничий кооператив «Гласність-5» (Харків)
Daphnis and Chloe Dafnis I Khloya Дафніс і Хлоя	Yuriy Kuz’menko Юрій Кузьменко	1992	Odesa Branch of Strannik LLC Одеське відділення ТОВ «Странник»
Child by November Dytyna do lystopadu Дитина до листопаду	Oleksandr Pavlovskyi Олександр Павловський	1992	Odesa Film Studio Arcadia CPA Одеська кіностудія художніх фільмів, ВТО «Аркадія»
For the home Dlya domashnyoho ohnyshcha/Dlya simeynoho ohnyshcha Для домашнього огнища / Для сімейного огнища	Borys Savchenko Борис Савченко	1992	Dovzhenko Film Studio Київська кіностудія художніх фільмів ім. О. П. Довженка
The road is nowhere Doroha nikudy Дорога нікуди	Oleksandr Muratov Олександр Муратов	1992	Dovzhenko Film Studio Київська кіностудія художніх фільмів ім. О. П. Довженка
Squadron Eskadron Ескадрон	Juliusz Machulski Юліуш Махульський	1992	Arkadiia CPA (Odesa) Zebra Film Studio (Poland) ВТО «Аркадія» (Одеса), студія «Зебра» (Польща)
Horror Zhakh Жах	Yurіi Suyarko Юрій Суярко	1992	Ukrtelefilm Укртелефільм
For Natusia's sake Zarady Natusya Заради Натуся	Yurіi Suyarko Юрій Суярко	1992	Ukrtelefilm Укртелефільм
A sinister fate Zlovisna dolya Зловісна доля	Yurіi Suyarko Юрій Суярко	1992	Ukrtelefilm Укртелефільм
Ivan and the Mare Ivan ta kobyla Іван та кобила	Volodymyr Fesenko Володимир Фесенко	1992	Ros National Cultural Production Centre Національно-культурний виробничий центр «Рось»
The Ideal Couple Idealna para Ідеальна пара	Aleksandr Polynnikov Алєксандр Полинніков	1992	Aura Studio (Odesa) MIKO Company (Saint-Petersburg) Студія «Аура» (Одеса), фірма «МИКО» (Санкт-Петербург)
Kyiev applicants Kyivski prokhachi Київські прохачі	Rostyslav Synko Ростислав Синько	1992	Ukrtelefilm Укртелефільм
Oxygen Starvation Kysnevyi holod Кисневий голод	Andrіi Donchyk Андрій Дончик	1992	Kobza International Corporation (Canada) Kobza Joint Venture (Ukraine, Canada) Peremoha Fish Farm Кобза Інтернейшнл Корпорейшн (Канада), СП «Кобза» (Україна, Канада), рибоколгосп «Перемога»
The Lame Shall Enter First Kulhavi uviidyt pershi Кульгаві увійдуть перші	Mykhaylo Kats Михайло Кац	1992	Eksperyment Film Studio (Odesa) Кіностудія «Експеримент» (Одеса)
Bench "Ruby and ..." Lavka "Rubinchyk i…" Лавка «Рубінчик і...»	Yuriy Sadomskyi Юрій Садомський	1992	Odesa CPA ВТО «Одеса»
Man K. Liudyna K. Людина К.	Serhii Rakhmanin Сергій Рахманін (кінорежисер)	1992	Odesa CPA under the aegis of the Nord-Bank ВТО «Одеса» під егідою «Норд-банку»
Human happiness Lyudske shchastia Людське щастя	Serhii Dudka Сергій Дудка	1992	Ukrtelefilm Укртелефільм
A melodrama with attempted murder Melodrama iz zamakhom na vbyvstvo Мелодрама із замахом на вбивство	Mykola Maletskyi Микола Малецький	1992	Dovzhenko Film Studio Ekran Studio Promin Kyiv Commercial Centre Київська кіностудія художніх фільмів ім. О. П. Довженка, ТО «Экран», Київський комерційний центр «Промінь»
Dead without burial or Hunting for rats Mertvi bez pokhovannya, abo polyuvannya na patsyukiv Мертві без поховання, або полювання на пацюків	Ihor Apasian Ігор Апасян	1992	TOR Film Studio TIRS Film Production Company (Odesa) Кіностудія «ТОР» фірми «ТІРС» (Одеса)
Sitter Naturnyk Натурник	Victor Vasylenko Віктор Василенко	1992	Ukrtelefilm Укртелефільм
Don't Fly Away, Earthling! Ne vidlitay, zemlyanyn! Не відлітай, землянин	Dmytro Kostromenko Дмитро Костроменко	1992	Soyuztelefilm CPA Odisey CPA ВТО «Одісей» (Одеса), «Союзтелефильм» (Росія)
You're such a witch Nu ty i vidma... Ну ти й відьма...	Eduard Dmytriiev Едуард Дмитрієв	1992	Ukrtelefilm Укртелефільм
Vow Obitnytsya Обітниця	Vasyl Illiashenko Василь Ілляшенко	1992	Dovzhenko Film Studio XXI vik Film Studio Київська кіностудія художніх фільмів ім. О. П. Довженка, Кіностудія «XXI вік»
Web Павутиння	Oleksandr Amelіn Олександр Амелін	1992	Odisey CPA ВТО «Одісей» (Одеса)
Air pirates Povitriani piraty Повітряні пірати	Dmytro Kostromenko Дмитро Костроменко	1992	Odesa CPA Duma LLC with participation of Odesa Film Studio and Odesa Shipyard No.1 ВТО «Одеса» (Одеса), «Дума», за участі Одеського судноремонтного заводу No. 1 та Одеського кіновідеопрокату
Fashionable Po-modnomu По-модньому	Yurіi Nekrasov Юрій Некрасов	1992	Ukrtelefilm
Shot in the coffin Postril v truni Постріл в труні	Mykola Zasieiev-Rudenko Микола Засєєв-Руденко	1992	Dovzhenko Film Studio XXI vik Film Studio Київська кіностудія художніх фільмів ім. О. П. Довженка, Кіностудія «XXI вік»
Ask, and you shall receive Prosit, I bude vam/ Hospody, pochui molytvy moii Просіть, і буде вам / Господи, почуй молитву мою	Natalia Bondarchuk	1992	Odissey Production Company Vyvaton Company Soyuztelefilm CPA
Birds from an invisible island Ptakhy nevydymoho ostrova Птахи невидимого острова	Ye. Zakharevych, I. Korniichuk	1992	Ukrtelefilm
Season of the naked heart Sezon oholenoho sertsia Сезон оголеного серця	Oleksandr Burko Олександр Бурко	1992	Odesa CPA ВТО «Одеса» (Одеса)
Hearts of three Sertsya tryokh Серця трьох	Volodymyr Popkov Володимир Попков	1992	Dovzhenko Film Studio Yalta-film Київська кіностудія художніх фільмів ім. О. П. Довженка, Ялтинська кіностудія
Rural adventures Sil's’ki buval’shchyny Сільські бувальщини	Yurii Nekrasov Юрій Некрасов	1992	Ukrtelefilm Укртелефільм
Seven to forty Sim sorok Сім сорок	Oleksandr Yeremieiev Олександр Єремєєв	1992	TOR Film Studio TIRS Film Production Company (Odesa) Кіностудія «ТОР», «ТІРС» (Одеса)
In the beginning was the word Spochatku bulo slovo Спочатку було слово	Yurii Solomin Юрій Соломін	1992	Odesa Film Studio Hraal CPA (Odesa) Russian National Bank Torras Joint-stock Company Одеська кіностудія художніх фільмів, ВТО «Грааль» (Одеса), Російського Національного банку, АО «Торрас»
The Secret of the Villa Tayemnytsya villy Таємниця вілли	Yurii Zharykov Юрій Жариков	1992	21st Century Studio Студія «ХХI вік»
Hungarian Medea Uhors’ka Medeya Угорська Медея	Volodymyr Zinchenko В. Зінченко	1992	Ukrtelefilm Укртелефільм
Fatal diamonds Fatal’ni diamanty Фатальні діаманти	Boris Nebіierіdze Борис Небієрідзе	1992	Ukrtelefilm Lybid CPA Укртелефільм, ВТО «Либідь»
I Want Your Husband Khochu vashoho cholovika Хочу вашого чоловіка	Serhіi Nykonenko Сергій Никоненко	1992	Odesa Film Studio Arcadiia CPA Одеська кіностудія художніх фільмів, ВТО «Аркадія»
Dandelion Blossom Tsvitinnya kul’baby Цвітіння кульбаби	Oleksandr Іhnatusha Олександр Ігнатуша	1992	Dovzhenko Film Studio Київська кіностудія художніх фільмів ім. О. П. Довженка
Chas Iks X-hour Час Ікс	Oleksandr Burtsev Олександр Бурцев	1992	Odesa Film Studio Одеська кіностудія художніх фільмів
Chench Ченч	Roman Hai Роман Гай	1992	Aspark Film (Odesa) «Аспарк-фільм» (Одеса)
Four sheets of plywood Chotyry lysty fanery Чотири листи фанери	Saido Kurbanov Сайдо Курбанов	1992	Ukrainian Film and Video Company (Kyiv) Українська кіно-відео фірма (Київ)
The Sentimental Policeman Chutlyvyi militsioner Чутливий міліціонер	Kira Muratova Кіра Муратова	1992	Primodesa-Film Production Company (Odesa) ParaMedia (Moscow) «Прімодеса-фільм» (Одеса), «Парамедиа» (Москва)
That we were attacked by money Shchob nan as napaly hroshi Щоб на нас напали гроші	Іhor Kozlov-Petrovskyi Ігор Козлов-Петровський	1992	Iuh-Firm Studio (Odesa) Студія «Юг-фільм» (Одеса)

1993
Brave Guys Bravi khloptsi Браві хлопці	Mykola Zasieiev-Rudenko Микола Засєєв-Руденко	1993	Dovzhenko Film Studio Impex Group LCC Київська кіностудія художніх фільмів ім. О. П. Довженка, «Імпекс група» Лімітед Компані Корпорейшн
Hunt for the Cossack Gold Vpered, za skarbamy hetmana Вперед, за скарбами гетьмана!	Vadym Castelli Вадим Кастеллі	1993	Dovzhenko Film Studio Fest Zemlya CPA Omnisphere Ukraine Investments (USA) Київська кіностудія художніх фільмів ім. О. П. Довженка, «Фест-Земля», Омнісфера Юкрейн Інвестментс (США)
Kleinods of Hetman Hetmanski kleinody Гетьманські клейноди	Leonid Osyka Леонід Осика	1993	Dovzhenko Film Studio Київська кіностудія художніх фільмів ім. О. П. Довженка
Sinner in the Mask Hrishnytsia v mastsi Грішниця в масці	Svitlana Ilinska Світлана Ільїнська	1993	Dovzhenko Film Studio Київська кіностудія художніх фільмів ім. О. П. Довженка
Wild Love Dyka liubov Дика любов	Villen Novak Віллен Новак	1993	Odesa Film Studio Одеська кіностудія художніх фільмів
Spirits of Hell Dukhy pekla Духи пекла	Yurіi Muzyka Юрій Музика	1993	Kaskader Film «Каскадер-фільм»
Jews, Cheers! Yevrei, budmo! Євреї будьмо!	Viktor Vasylenko Віктор Василенко	1992	Ukrtelefilm Zoloti Vorota Studio Partner SE Укртелефільм, Студія «Золоті ворота», МП «Партнер»
Champs Elysees Yelyseiski polia Єлисейські поля	Oleksii Levchenko Олексій Левченко	1993	Dovzhenko Film Studio Ch Studio Київська кіностудія художніх фільмів ім. О. П. Довженка, Студія «Ч»
The Smell of Autumn Zapakh oseni Запах осені	Victor Nozdriukhin-Zabolotnyi Віктор Ноздрюхін-Заболотний	1993	EDF Film Company Кінофірма «ЕДФ»
Hostages of Fear Zaruchnyky strakhu Заручники страху	Oleksandr Vizyr Олександр Візир	1993	Dovzhenko Film Studio Ch Studio, supported by Lisbank Київська кіностудія художніх фільмів ім. О. П. Довженка, Студія «Ч», підтримка «Лісбанку»
The Capture Zakhoplennia Захоплення	Kira Muratova Кіра Муратова	1993	Odesa Film Studio (Ukraine) Nikola-Film Radio and TV Broadcasting (RTB) (Russia) Одеська кіновідеостудія (Україна), РТВ «Нікола-фільм» (Росія)
Marshmallow in Chocolate Zefir v shokoladi Зефір в шоколаді	Oleksandr Pavlovskyi Олександр Павловський	1993	AVA CPA (Odesa) ВТО «АВА» (Одеса)
Conspiracy of Skurlatai Zmova Skurlataiv Змова скурлатаїв	Volodymyr Pozdniakov Володимир Поздняков	1993	Flora (Odesa) «Флора» (Одеса)
Golden Chicken Zolote kurcha Золоте курча	Volodymyr Krainiev Володимир Крайнєв	1993	Slavuta Film Company (Kyiv) Кінофірма «Славута» (Київ)
The Gold of the Party Zoloto partii Золото партії	Anatolii Ivanov Анатолій Іванов	1993	Dovzhenko Film Studio Impex Group LCC Київська кіностудія художніх фільмів ім. О. П. Довженка, «Імпекс група» Лімітед Компані Корпорейшн
Other Inshyi Інший / Другий	Serhii Rakhmanin Сергій Рахманін	1993	Kona-Prim CPA Nord-Bank (Odesa) ВТО «Кона-прим». «Норд-Банк» (Одеса)
Kaidash's Family Kaidasheva simia Кайдашева сім'я	Volodymyr Horodko Володимир Городько	1993	Kozak Consortium Консорціум «Козак»
To Whom Up, to Whom Down Komu vhoru, komu vnyz Кому вгору, кому вниз	Stanislav Klymenko Станіслав Клименко	1993	Ros NCPS Національно-культурний виробничий центр «Рось»
La Cumparsita Cumparsita Кумпарсіта	Alieksandr Polynnikov Алєксандр Полинніков	1993	Aura Studio (Odesa) MIKO Firm (St. Petersburg) Студія «Аура» (Одеса), фірма «МИКО» (Санкт-Петербург)
Lenin in the Ring of Fire Lenin u vohnennomu kiltsi Ленін у вогненному кільці	Nikolai Litus Микола Літус	1993	Istyna Artistic and Creative Association of Writers and Cinematographers Художньо-творче об'єднання письменників і кінематографістів «Істина»
A Night of Questions Nich pytan Ніч питань	Tetiana Mahar Тетяна Магар	1993	Convet Company Фірма «Конвет»
Paid in Advance... Oplacheno zavchasno... Оплачено завчасно...	Oksana Bairak Оксана Байрак	1993	NEP-Film LTD Film Production Company Кінокомпанія «НЕП-фільм ЛТД»
Fuzhou Ochikuiuchy vantazh na reidi Fuzhou Bilia pahody/ Fuzhou Очікуючи вантаж на рейді Фучжоу біля пагоди / Фучжоу	Mykhailo Illienko Михайло Іллєнко	1993	Dovzhenko Film Studio Київська кіностудія художніх фільмів ім. О. П. Довженка
In a Straight Line Po priamii По прямій	Serhii Chliiants Сергій Чліянц	1993	Odyseus CPA (Odesa) ВТО «Одісей» (Одеса)
Passion for Angelica Prystrasti za Anzhelikoiu Пристрасті за Анжелікою	Alieksandr Polynnikov Алєксандр Полинніков	1992	Aura Studio (Odesa) MIKO Firm (St. Petersburg) Студія «Аура» (Одеса), фірма «МИКО» (Санкт-Петербург)
About Mad Love, Sniper and Cosmonaut Pro shalene kohannia, snaipera i kosmonavta Про шалене кохання, снайпера і космонавта	Dmytro Tomashpolskyi Дмитро Томашпольський	1992	Alliance-Concern JSC Arii Studio (Kyiv) АТ «Альянс-Концерн», Студія «Арій» (Київ)
Summertime Sammertaim Саммертайм	Serhii Stasenko Сергій Стасенко	1993	Odyseus CPA (Odesa) ВТО «Одісей» (Одеса)
The Secret Echelon Secretnyi eshelon Секретний ешелон	Yaroslav Lupii Ярослав Лупій	1993	Blahovest Film and Video Studio, commissioned by the State Cinematography Fund of Ukraine, with the participation of Apol, with the assistance of Odesa Film Factory Кіновідеостудія «Благовест», на замовлення Державного фонду кінематографії України, за участі підприємства «Аполь», при сприянні кінокомбінату «Одеса-фільм»
Hearts of Three – 2 Sertsia trokh – 2 Серця трьох – 2	Volodymyr Popkov Володимир Попков	1992	Dovzhenko Film Studio Yalta Film Studio Guild of Film Artists of Ukraine Київська кіностудія художніх фільмів ім. О. П. Довженка, Ялтинська кіностудія, Гільдія художників кіно України
A Method of Murder Sposib vbyvstva Спосіб вбивства	Oleh Hoida Олег Гойда	1993	Dovzhenko Film Studio Ch Studio Київська кіностудія художніх фільмів ім. О. П. Довженка, Студія «Ч»
Istanbul Transit Stambulskyi tranzyt Стамбульський транзит	Hryhorii Kokhan Григорій Кохан	1993	Dovzhenko Film Studio Ch Studio Київська кіностудія художніх фільмів ім. О. П. Довженка, Студія «Ч»
Outsider/ Giraffe Storonnii/ Zhyrafa Сторонній / Жирафа	Volodymyr Klimov Володимир Клімов	1993	Mustang «Мустанг»
Cockroach Races Tarhaniachi perehony Тарганячі перегони	Roman Hai Роман Гай	1993	Prometheus Military Patriotic Association (MPA) of soldiers-internationalists (Odesa) ВПО «Прометей» воїнів-інтернаціоналістів (Одеса)
In Search of a Millionaire U poshykakh milionerky У пошуках мільйонерки	Volodymyr Artemenko Володимир Артеменко	1993	Ukrainian Newsreel Kyiv Theater of Satire «Укркінохроніка», Київський театр сатири
The Formula of Ecstasy Formula ekstazu Формула екстазу	Ihor Kozlov-Petrovskyi Ігор Козлов-Петровський	1993	Yuh-Film Studio (Odesa) Студія «Юг-фільм» (Одеса)
Men's Company Cholovicha kompaniia Чоловіча компанія	Andrii Rostotskyi Андрій Ростоцький	1993	Tonis TV Company (Kyiv) MB Intercom Телекомпанія «Тоніс» (Київ), ПКП «Інтерком»
I Love Ya liubliu Я люблю	Oleksandr Chernykh Олександр Черних	1993	Alina Firm Ekran CA Ostankino TVRC (Russia) Фірма «Аліна», ТО «Экран», ТРК «Останкино» (Росія)
On My Own Ya sama Я сама	Ihor Maksymchuk Ігор Максимчук	1993	Odyseus CPA Dohma (Odesa) ВТО «Одісей», «Догма» (Одеса)
1994
Afghan-2 Afhanets-2 Афганець-2	Volodymyr Mazyr Володимир Мазур	1994	Ukrainian Union of Veterans of Afghanistan Chervona Ruta SE Aval Bank Українська спілка ветеранів Афганістану, МП «Червона Рута», Банк «Аваль»
A Cheerful Trip Veselenka poizdka Веселенька поїздка	Borys Nebiieridze Борис Небієрідзе	1994	CCG Yalta Film RDFTO (Russia) ТОНАП, «Ялта-фильм», РОСТО (Росія)
A Ransom Vykup Викуп	Volodymyr Balkashynov Володимир Балкашинов	1994	Tana-TV Company Nord-Bank Primodesa-Film Телекомпанія «Тана-ТВ», «Норд-Банк», «Прімодеса-фільм»
A Prison Viaznytsia В'язниця	Oksana Abdulaieva Оксана Абдулаєва	1994	Panorama Studio Студія «Панорама»
Down with Shame! Het sorom! Геть сором!	Oleksandr Muratov Олександр Муратов	1994	Dovzhenko Film Studio Київська кіностудія художніх фільмів ім. О. П. Довженка
A Few Love Stories Dekilka liubivnykh istorii Декілька любовних історій	Andrii Benkendorf Бенкендорф Андрій Олександрович	1994	Dovzhenko Film Studio Seelex Firm Київська кіностудія художніх фільмів ім. О. П. Довженка, фірма «Seelex»
A Road to the Sich Doroha na Sich Дорога на Січ	Serhii Omelchuk Сергій Омельчук	1994	Dovzhenko Film Studio Strouks SE Київська кіностудія художніх фільмів ім. О. П. Довженка, МП «Строукс»
A Cruel Fantasy Zhorstoka fantaziia Жорстока фантазія	Olena Demianenko Олена Дем'яненко	1994	Liga-D (Ukraine), with the participation of Kinorama (Lithuania) Ліга-Д (Україна), за участі фірми «Кінорама» (Литва)
Mephistopheles Notes Zapysky kyrpatoho Mefistofelia Записки кирпатого Мефістофеля	Yurii Liashenko Юрій Ляшенко	1994	Dovzhenko Film Studio Київська кіностудія художніх фільмів ім. О. П. Довженка
The Pirate Empire Imperiia pirativ Імперія піратів	Hryhor Hardushian Григор Гардушян	1994	Yalta Film Studio East-West Russian-British CA Golden Duke Audience Center Кіностудія «Ялта-фильм», Російсько-Британська творча Асоціація «Іст-Вест», Глядацький центр «Золотий дюк»
The Man from the Team "Alpha" Liudyna z komandy "Alfa" Людина з команди «Альфа»	Nebiieridze Borys Небієрідзе Борис Костянтинович	1994	Ukrtelefilm Lybid CPA Укртелефільм, ВТО «Либідь»
Monsieur Robin Msie Robina Мсьє Робіна	Oleksandr Burko Олександр Бурко	1994	Beseder (Odesa) «Беседер» (Одеса)
Born of God/Born from Above Narodzheni vid boha/ Narodzheni vyshche Народжені від бога / Народжені вище	Mykola Kosheliev Микола Кошелєв	1994	Odesa Film Studio Одеська кіновідеостудія
The Parable Prytcha Притча	Vasyl Illiashenko Василь Ілляшенко	1994	Dovzhenko Film Studio Київська кіностудія художніх фільмів ім. О. П. Довженка
The Fifth Corner Piatyi kut П'ятий кут	Ihor Kozlov-Petrovskyi, Oleksandr Moriev Ігор Козлов-Петровський, Олександр Морєв	1994	Yuh-Film Studio (Odesa) Фірма «Юг-фільм» (Одеса)
Josephine the Singer and the Mouse People Spivachka Zhozefina I Myshachyi Narod Співачка Жозефіна й Мишачий Народ	Serhii Masloboishchykov Сергій Маслобойщиков	1994	Dovzhenko Film Studio Innoww-Film (Germany) Київська кіностудія художніх фільмів ім. О. П. Довженка, «Інновв-фільм» (Німеччина)
The Hunters and the Hunted Tyhrolovy Тигролови	Rostyslav Synko Ростислав Синько	1994	Ukrtelefilm Укртелефільм
Tryn-bryn Тринь-бринь	Radomyr Vasylevskyi Радомир Василевський	1994	Odesa Film Studio Одеська кіновідеостудія
A Man of Easy Virtue Cholovik lehkoi povedinky Чоловік легкої поведінки	Alieksandr Polynnikov Алєксандр Полинніков	1994	Odesa cpa MIKO Firm (St. Petersburg) ВТО «Одеса», фірма «МИКО» (Санкт-Петербург)
Shamara Shamara Шамара	Nataliia Andriichenko Наталія Андрійченко	1994	Dovzhenko Film Studio Київська кіностудія художніх фільмів ім. О. П. Довженка
1995
Assassination. An Autumn Murder in Munich Atentant – Osinnie vbyvstvo u Miunkheni Атентат — Осіннє вбивство у Мюнхені	Oles Yanchuk Олесь Янчук	1995	Dovzhenko Film Studio Oles-Film Studio Ukrainian Congressional Committee of America Київська кіностудія художніх фільмів ім. О. П. Довженка, Студія «Олесь-фільм», Український Конгресовий комітет Америки
We Will Live Budemo zhyty Будемо жити	Dmytro Tomashpolskyi Дмитро Томашпольський	1995	Dity Meliesa Film Company (Kyiv) Кінокомпанія «Діти Мельєса» (Київ)
Gelli and Nok Helli i Nok Геллі і Нок	Vadym Illienko Вадим Іллєнко	1995	Dovzhenko Film Studio Yalta Film Studio Київська кіностудія художніх фільмів ім. О. П. Довженка, кіностудія «Ялта-фильм»
Gemini Man Dviinyk Двійник	Oleksii Maistrenko, Artur Hural Олексій Майстренко, Артур Гураль	1995	Dovzhenko Film Studio Triuk Maister Film Company Triuk Film Company Maister CA Київська кіностудія художніх фільмів ім. О. П. Довженка, кінокомпанія «Трюк майстер», кінокомпанія «Трюк», ТО «Майстер»
Jesus, the Son of the Living God Isus, syn Boha zhyvoho Ісус, син Бога живого	Fedir Stryhun Федір Стригун	1995	Halychyna-film Галичина-фільм
It Is Better to Be Beautiful and Rich Krashche buty vrodlyvoiu I bahatoiu Краще бути вродливою і багатою	Felix Bayon, Valentyna Kobliuk Фелікс Байон, Валентина Коблюк	1995	Ukrtelefilm Manfred Film (Germany) Dialogue Film (Hungary) DOM Studio (Poland) Polish Television Укртелефільм, «Манфред-фільм» (Німеччина), «Діалог-фільм» (Угорщина), студія «ДОМ» (Польща), Польське телебачення
The Muscovite-Wizard Moskal-charivnyk Москаль-чарівник	Mykola Zasieiev-Rudenko Микола Засєєв-Руденко	1995	Dovzhenko Film Studio Київська кіностудія художніх фільмів ім. О. П. Довженка
A Raid Наліт	Ihor Shevchenko Ігор Шевченко	1995	Orion Film Company, Odesa CPA Кінокомпанія «Оріон», ВТО «Одеса»
Beware! Red Mercury Oberezhno! Chervona rtut Обережно! Червона ртуть	Anatolii Ivanov Анатолій Іванов	1995	Dovzhenko Film Studio Київська кіностудія художніх фільмів ім. О. П. Довженка
The "J" Object Об'єкт «Джей»	Volodymyr Onyshchenko Володимир Онищенко	1995	Ukrtelefilm Tana-TV Company (Ukraine) Carmen (Russia) Укртелефільм, Тана-ТВ (Україна), «Кармен» (Росія)
Score on the Gravestone Partytura na mohylnomu kameni Партитура на могильному камені	Yaroslav Lupii Ярослав Лупій	1995	Odesa Film Studio Blahovist Film Studio with the assistance of Horn RRC Одеська кіновідеостудія, Кіновідеостудія «Благовіст», за сприяння НРЦ «Горн»
A Train to Brooklyn Poizd do Bruklina Поїзд до Брукліна	Valerii Fedosov Валерій Федосов	1995	Odesa Film Studio Budushcheie Film Firm (Odesa) Lingcom (Russia) Одеська кіновідеостудія, Кінофірма «Будущее» (Одеса), «Лингком» (Росія)
A Raid Nalit Наліт	Volodymyr Balkashynov Володимир Балкашинов	1995	Panorama Studio with the participation of the Luhansk Regional Directorate of Aval JSPPB Студія «Панорама», за участі Луганської облдирекції АППБ «Аваль»
Executed Dawns Stracheni svitanky Страчені світанки	Hryhorii Kokhan Григорій Кохан	1995	Dovzhenko Film Studio Київська кіностудія художніх фільмів ім. О. П. Довженка
1996
Without Dog Сollar Bez nashyinyka Без нашийника	Radomyr Vasylevskyi Радомир Василевський	1995	Odesa Film Studio Одеська кіностудія художніх фільмів
Woodcocks Valdshnepy Вальдшнепи	Oleksndr Muratov Олександр Муратов	1996	Dovzhenko Film Studio Київська кіностудія художніх фільмів ім. О. П. Довженка
Kaidash's Family. The Second Film Kaidasheva simia. Film druhyi Кайдашева сім'я. Фільм другий	Volodymyr Horodko Володимир Городько	1996	Berehynia Independent Film Community «Берегиня», Незалежна Кіногромада
Operation Contract / Diversion under Contract Operatsiia Kontrakt/ Dyversiia za kontraktom Операція «Контракт» / Диверсія за контрактом	Tamara Boiko Тамара Бойко	1996	Ukrtelefilm Укртелефільм
Judenkreis, or Eternal Wheel Judenkreis, abo Vichne koleso Judenkreis, або Вічне колесо	Vasyl Dombrovskyi Василь Домбровський	1996	Dovzhenko Film Studio Київська кіностудія художніх фільмів ім. О. П. Довженка
1997
The Princess on Beans Pryntsesa na bobah Принцеса на бобах	Villen Novak Віллен Новак	1997	Odesa Film Studio of Feature Films Shans Studio (Russia), with the participation of TV Center (Russia) Одеська кіностудія художніх фільмів, студія «Шанс» (Росія), за участі компанії ТВ-Центр (Росія)
A Friend of the Deceased Pryiatel nebizhchyka Приятель небіжчика	Viacheslav Kryshtofovych В'ячеслав Криштофович	1997	Dovzhenko Film Studio Київська кіностудія художніх фільмів ім. О. П. Довженка
The Holy Family Sviate simeistvo Святе сімейство	Mykhailo Bielikov Михайло Бєліков	1997	Dovzhenko Film Studio Київська кіностудія художніх фільмів ім. О. П. Довженка
The Seventh Route Сьомий маршрут	Mykhailo Illienko Михайло Іллєнко	1997	Dovzhenko Film Studio Київська кіностудія художніх фільмів ім. О. П. Довженка
Three Stories Try istorii Три історії	Kira Muratova Кіра Муратова	1997	Odesa Film Studio of Feature Films (Ukraine) NTV-Profit (Russia) Одеська кіностудія художніх фільмів (Україна), НТВ-Профіт (Росія)
The Continent of Love Hippiniada abo materyk kohannia Хіппініада або материк кохання	Andrii Benckendorf Андрій Бенкендорф	1997	Dovzhenko Film Studio Київська кіностудія художніх фільмів ім. О. П. Довженка
1998
Two Moons, Three Suns Dva misiatsi, try sontsia Два місяці, три сонця	Roman Balaian Роман Балаян	1998	Illusion Films (Kyiv) «Ілюзіон фільмз» (Київ)
Two Julia Dvi Yulii Дві Юлії	Olena Demianenko Олена Дем'яненко	1998	Dovzhenko Film Studio Київська кіностудія художніх фільмів ім. О. П. Довженка
The Dead-end Tupyk/ Hluhyi kut Тупик / Глухий кут	Hryhorii Kokhan Григорій Кохан	1998	Dovzhenko Film Studio Maister-Video Київська кіностудія художніх фільмів ім. О. П. Довженка, «Майстер-Відео»
The Gravity of the Sun (Dandelion Wine) Tiazhinnia sontsia (Vyno z kulbabok) Тяжіння сонця (Вино з кульбабок)	Ihor Apasian Ігор Апасян	1998	Odissei Stusio Hamaiun Studio ARSTRBC "Russia" Ostankino (Russia) Студія «Одіссей», студія «Гамаюн», ВДТРК «Росія», «Останкино» (Росія)
1999
Ave Maria Ave Mariia Аве Марія	Liudmyla Yefymenko Людмила Єфименко	1999	Dovzhenko Film Studio The Ministry of Culture of Ukraine Київська кіностудія художніх фільмів ім. О. П. Довженка, Міністерство культури і мистецтв України
The Poet and the Kniazhna Poet i kniazhna Поет і княжна	Stanislav Klymenko Станіслав Клименко	1999	Dzherelo RPA Zelenyi Pes Production Agency, with the assistance of Inter TV НПО «Джерело», Продюсерська агенція «Зелений пес», за сприяння телекомпанії «Інтер»
Hello Everyone! Usim pryvit! Усім привіт!	Dmytro Tomashpolskyi Дмитро Томашпольський	1999	Gagarin Media Dovzhenko Kyiv Film Studio of Feature Films TVRC Kyiv «Гагарін Медіа», Київська кіностудія художніх фільмів ім. О. П. Довженка, ТРК «Київ»
A Blacksmith Searches for Happiness Yak koval shxhastia shukav Як коваль щастя шукав	Radomyr Vasylevskyi Радомир Василевський	1999	Odesa Film Studio of Feature Films Одеська кіностудія художніх фільмів
2000
Paradise Lost Vtrachenyi rai Втрачений рай	Valerii Rozhko Валерій Рожко	2000	Dovzhenko Kyiv Film Studio of Feature Films Darzini (Dnepropetrovsk) Київська кіностудія художніх фільмів ім. О. П. Довженка, «Дарзіні» (Дніпропетровськ)
Life is Like a Circus Zhyttia yak zyrk Життя як цирк	Yevhen Shyshkin Євген Шишкін	2000	Sheerar trading Co (Ukraine, USA) «Sheerar trading Co» (Україна, США)
Car Washers Myinyky avtomobiliv Мийники автомобілів	Volodymyr Tykhyi Володимир Тихий	2000	Dovzhenko Kyiv Film Studio of Feature Films Київська кіностудія художніх фільмів ім. О. П. Довженка
The Undefeated Neskorenyi Нескорений	Oles Yanchuk Олесь Янчук	2000	Dovzhenko Film Studio Ukrainian Congressional Committee of America Oles-Film Ivano-Frankivsk Regional Council Halychyna Trading House Київська кіностудія художніх фільмів ім. О. П. Довженка, Український Конгресовий комітет Америки, «Олесь-фільм», обласна рада Івана-Франківська, Торговий Дім «Галичина»
2001
Minor People Druhoriadni liudy Другорядні люди	Kira Muratova Кіра Муратова	2001	Odesa Film Studio of Feature Films Одеська кіностудія художніх фільмів
On the Field of Blood Na poli krovi На полі крові	Yaroslav Lupii Ярослав Лупій	2001	Odesa Film Studio of Feature Films Одеська кіностудія художніх фільмів
2002
A Prayer for Hetman Mazepa Молитва за гетьмана Мазепу	Yurii Illienko Юрій Іллєнко	2002	Dovzhenko Film Studio Київська кіностудія художніх фільмів ім. О. П. Довженка
The Noise of the Wind Шум вітру	Serhii Masloboishchykov Сергій Маслобойщиков	2002	Dovzhenko Film Studio Київська кіностудія художніх фільмів ім. О. П. Довженка
Embroiderer at Dusk Vyshyvalnytsia v sytinkakh Вишивальниця в сутінках	Mykola Sedniev Микола Седнєв	2002	Odesa Film Studio of Feature Films Одеська кіностудія художніх фільмів
Chekhov's Motives Chekhovski motyvy Чеховські мотиви	Kira Muratova Кіра Муратова	2002	Odesa Film Studio of Feature Films (Ukraine) / Nikola-Film (Russia) Одеська кіностудія художніх фільмів (Україна)/ Никола-фильм (Росія)
Atlantis Atlantyda Атлантида	Oleksandr Pavlovskyi Олександр Павловський	2002	Odesa Film Studio of Feature Films (Ukraine) / Film-Pro (Russia) Одеська кіностудія художніх фільмів (Україна)/ Фільм-Про (Росія)
2003
Mamai Mamai Мамай	Oles Sanin Олесь Санін	2003	Dovzhenko Film Studio Zemlia CA Western European Institute, Fresco Film Studio Київська кіностудія художніх фільмів ім. О. П. Довженка, Творче об'єднання Земля, Західно-Європейський інститут, Кіностудія Фрески
2004
The Three Musketeers Try mushketery Три мушкетери	Tina Barkalay Тіна Баркалай	2004	Dovzhenko Film Studio Київська кіностудія художніх фільмів ім. О. П. Довженка
2005
The Brotherhood Bratstvo Братство	Stanislav Klymenko Станіслав Клименко	2005	Dovzhenko Film Studio AUS Prosvita Київська кіностудія художніх фільмів ім. О. П. Довженка, ВТ Просвіта
Second hand Second khend Секонд хенд	Yaroslav Lupii Ярослав Лупій	2005	Odesa Film Studio of Feature Films Одеська кіностудія художніх фільмів
2006
The Murder in Winter Yalta Vbyvstvo u zumovii Yalti Вбивство у зимовій Ялті	Oleksandr Muratov Олександр Муратов	2006	Dovzhenko Kyiv Film Studio of Feature Films named Київська кіностудія художніх фільмів ім. О. П. Довженка
The Two and the War Dvoie i viina Двоє і війна	Vitalii Vorobiov, Yevhen Zvezdakov Віталій Воробйов, Євген Звездаков	2006	Odesa Film Studio of Feature Films Одеська кіностудія художніх фільмів
The Effect of Presence Ефект присутності	Leonid Pavlovskyi Леонід Павловський	2006	Odesa Film Studio of Feature Films Одеська кіностудія художніх фільмів
2007
A Cossack beyond the Danube Zaporozhets za Dunaiem Запорожець за Дунаєм	Mykola Zasieiev-Rudenko Микола Засєєв-Руденко	2007	Dovzhenko Kyiv Film Studio of Feature Films Київська кіностудія художніх фільмів ім. О. П. Довженка
Korolev Korolov Корольов	Yurii Kara Юрій Кара	2007	Dovzhenko Kyiv Film Studio of Feature Films (Ukraine), Master (Russia) Київська кіностудія художніх фільмів ім. О. П. Довженка (Україна), Мастер (Росія)

2008
Bogdan Khmelnytsky Zynovy	Mykola Mashchenko Микола Мащенко	2008	Dovzhenko Film Studio (Київська кіностудія художніх фільмів ім. О. П. Довженка)
Mother of God under the window (Confession) Bogorodytsia pіd vіknom (Spovіd) Богородиця під вікном (Сповідь)	Vasyl Illiashenko Василь Ілляшенко	2008	Dovzhenko Film Studio (Київська кіностудія художніх фільмів ім. О. П. Довженка)
Law Zakon Закон	Vitaliy Potrukh Віталій Потрух	2008	Dovzhenko Film Studio (Київська кіностудія художніх фільмів ім. О. П. Довженка)
Dovzhenko begins, or Sashko-reformer Dovzhenko pochunaietsia, abo Sashko-reformator Довженко починається, або Сашко-реформатор	Vasyl Dombrovskyi Василь Домбровський	2008	Dovzhenko Film Studio (Київська кіностудія художніх фільмів ім. О. П. Довженка)
Metropolitan Andrey Vladyka Andrei Владика Андрей	Oles Yanchuk Олесь Янчук	2008	Dovzhenko Film Studio (Київська кіностудія художніх фільмів ім. О. П. Довженка)
By the river Bіlia rіchky Біля річки	Eva Neiman Єва Нейман	2007	Odesa Film Studio (Одеська кіностудія художніх фільмів
Vorozheya Ворожея	Ihor Shevchenko Ігор Шевченко	2008	Odesa Film Studio (Одеська кіностудія художніх фільмів)
Turquoise Ring Kіlechko z bіriuzoiu Кілечко з бірюзою	Oleksandr Itihilov Олександр Ітигілов	2008	Odesa Film Studio (Одеська кіностудія художніх фільмів)
God's Smile Posmіshka boga Посмішка бога	Volodymyr Alenikov Володимир Алєніко	2008	Odesa Film Studio (Одеська кіностудія художніх фільмів)
Sappers Sapery Сапери	Borys Shcherbakov, Vasilyy Shcherbakov, Victor Kustov Борис Щербаков, Василий Щербаков, Виктор Кустов	2008	Odesa Film Studio (Одеська кіностудія художніх фільмів)
Shoot immediately Strіliay nehaino Стріляй негайно	Villen Novak Віллен Новак	2008	Odesa Film Studio (Одеська кіностудія художніх фільмів)
Las Meninas Las Meninas	Ihor Podolchak Ігор Подольчак	2008	MF Films

2009			
The Day of Defeated Den peremozhenykh День переможених	Valerii Yamburskyi Валерій Ямбурський	2009	Dovzhenko Film Studio Київська кіностудія художніх фільмів ім. О. П. Довженка
May God Judge Them ... Khai Boh rozsudyt yikh... Хай Бог розсудить їх...	Yevhen Khvorostianko Євген Хворостянко	2009	Dovzhenko Film Studio Київська кіностудія художніх фільмів ім. О. П. Довженка
One Day I Will Wake Up Odnoho razu ya prokynus Одного разу я прокинусь	Maryna Kondratieva Марина Кондрат'єва	2009	Dovzhenko Film Studio Київська кіностудія художніх фільмів ім. О. П. Довженка

2010
2011
Bes Por No (Бес Пор No)	Oleksandr Shapiro Олександр Шапіро	2011	
2012
Gaidamak Haidamaka (Гайдамака)	Roman Sinchuk Роман Синчук	2012	Dovzhenko Film Studio Київська кіностудія художніх фільмів ім. О. П. Довженка
Gamer (Гамер)	Oleg Sentsov Олег Сєнцов	2012	Krai Kіnema LLC, Derzhkіno ТОВ «Край Кінема», Держкіно
Mum, I love a pilot Mamo, ya lotchyka lyublyu (Мамо, я льотчика люблю)	Oleksandr Ihnatusha Олександр Ігнатуша	2012	Dovzhenko Film Studio Київська кіностудія художніх фільмів ім. О. П. Довженка
Not a big thing Zvychaina sprava (Звичайна справа)	Valentyn Vasianovych Валентин Васянович	2012	
HeWhoCameThroughFire ToiHtoProyshovKrіzVogon (ТойХтоПройшовКрізьВогонь)	Mykhailo Ilienko Михайло Іллєнко	2012	
Ukraine. Starting point (Ukraine.Tochka vіdlіku) (Україна. Точка відліку)	Serhiy Bukovskyi Сергій Буковський	2012	
Backstreet Champion (Chempіony z pіdvorіttia) (Чемпіони з підворіття)	Akhtem Seitablaiev Ахтем Сейтаблаєв	2012	
Delirium (Delirium)	Ihor Podolchak Ігор Подольчак	2012	MF Films
2013
Brothers. The last confession (Braty.Ostannia spovіd) (Брати. Остання сповідь)	Victoria Trofimenko Вікторія Трофіменко	2015	Pronto Film Derzhkіno (Pronto Film, Держкіно)
Eternal returning Vіchne povernennia (Вічне повернення)	Kira Muratova Кіра Муратова	2013	
Ivan Syla (Іван Сила)	Victor Andriienko Віктор Андрієнко	2013	Іnsaitmedіa LLC Derzhkіno («Інсайтмедіа», Держкіно)
Kredens (Креденс)	Valentyn Vasyanovych Валентин Васянович	2013	Garmata Fіlm Production, Derzhkіno (ТОВ «Гармата фільм продакшн», Держкіно)
Pawnshop Lombard (Ломбард)	Lubomyr Levytskyi Любомир Левицький	2013	Kіnofabryka LLC Derzhkіno (ТОВ «Кінофабрика», Держкіно)
Luka (Diamond Cross, Prelate-Surgeon) Luka (Dіamantovyi hrest, Sviatytel-hіrurg) (Лука (Діамантовий хрест, Святитель-хірург))	Сергій Маслобойщиков, О. Пархоменко Serhii Masloboishchikov, O. Parkhomenko	2013	Patrіot-Fіlm LLC, Derzhkіno (ТОВ «Патріот-Фільм», Держкіно)
I don't want to die (Ne hochu pomyraty) (Не хочу помирати)	Alice Pavlovska Аліса Павловська	2013	
Paradjanov (Параджанов)	Serge Avedikian, Olena Fetisova Серж Аведікян, Олена Фетісова	2013	Іnterfіlm PE Derzhkіno (ПП «Інтерфільм», Держкіно)
Blind Date (Pobachennia naoslіp) (Побачення наосліп)	Levan Koguashvili Леван Когуашвілі	2013	
Synevir (Синевир)	Oleksandr Alioshechkin, Viacheslav Alioshechkin Олександр Альошечкін, В'ячеслав Альошечкін	2013	InQ Production Studio
Such beautiful people (Takі krasyvі liudy) (Такі красиві люди)	Dmytro Moiseiev Дмитро Мойсеєв	2013	Dovzhenko Film Studio (Київська кіностудія художніх фільмів ім. О. П. Довженка, Держкіно)
Do you love me? (Ty mene kohayesh) (Ти мене кохаєш?)	Dmytro Moiseiev, Julia Kurbatova Дмитро Мойсеєв, Юлія Курбатова	2013	
2014
F63.9 The disease of love F63.9 Hvoroba kokhannia) (F63.9 Хвороба кохання)	Dmytro Tomashpolskyi, Olena Demyanenko Дмитро Томашпольський, Олена Дем'яненко	2014	Gagarіn Medіa, Simposiom, Partner, Derzhkіno «Гагарін Медіа», Simposiom, «Партнер», Держкіно
Apart (Апарт)	Oleksandr Shapiro Олександр Шапіро	2014	
Babai (Бабай)	Maryna Medvid Марина Медвідь	2014	
The Green Jacket (Zelena kofta) (Зелена кофта)	Volodymyr Tykhyi Володимир Тихий	2014	Arthaus Trafіk, Derzhkіno «Артхаус Трафік», Держкіно
Kyiv cake (Kyivskyi tort) (Київський торт)	Oleksii Shaparev Олексій Шапарев	2014	Ukrainian Film Distribution
Love me (Liuby mene) (Люби мене)	Марія Ер Горбач, Мехмет Бахадир Ер Mariia Er Horbach, Mehmet Bahadyr Er	2014	Protim Video Production, Tatofіlm LLC, Derzhkіno Protim Video Production, ТОВ «Татофільм», Держкіно
My Mermaid, My Lorelei (Moia rusalka, moia Loreliai) (Моя русалка, моя Лореляй)	Nana Dzordzadze Нана Джорджадзе	2014	The Ministry of Culture of Russian Federation Hronograf, Vіctorіa, First Creative Association (Міністерство культури Російської Федерації, «Хронограф», «Вікторія», Перше творче об'єднання)
Tribe (Plemia) (Плем'я)	Myroslav Slaboshpytskyi Мирослав Слабошпицький	2014	Arthaus Trafіk, Derzhkіno («Артхаус Трафік», Держкіно)
The Guide (Povodyr) (Поводир)	Oles Sanin Олесь Санін	2014	Pronto Film, Derzhkіno (Pronto Film, Держкіно)
Flying golden fly (Polіt zolotoyi mushky) (Політ золотої мушки)	Ivan Kravchyshyn Іван Кравчишин	2014	Trembіta-kіno, Derzhkіno («Трембіта-кіно», Держкіно)
Lonely by Contract (Samotnіi za kontraktom) (Самотній за контрактом)	Yevhen Matviienko Євген Матвієнко	2014	Film.UA, Novyi kanal (Film.UA, «Новий канал»)
Trubach (Трубач)	Anatolii Mateshko Анатолій Матешко	2014	UkrKіno, Derzhkіno ("УкрКіно», Держкіно)
It's me (Tce ya) (Це я)	Anna Akulevych Анна Акулевич	2014	Contakt Film Studio, President Fіlm Ukraine, Derzhkіno (Contakt Film Studio, «Президент фільм Україна», Держкіно)
2015
Z Jock Z Dzhok (Z Джок)	Alexii Zalevskyi Олексій Залевський	2015	
Hetman (Гетьман)	Valerii Yamburskyi Валерій Ямбурський	2015	
Bug Zhuchok (Жучок)	Alla Pasikova, Andrii Rzhanov Алла Пасікова, Андрій Ржанов	2015	
The Lost City (Zahublene mіsto) (Загублене місто)	Vitalii Potrukh Віталій Потрух	2015	Dovzhenko Film Studio (Київська кіностудія художніх фільмів ім. О. П. Довженка,Держкіно")
Battle for Sevastopol (Nezlamna) (Незламна)	Serhii Mokrytskyi Сергій Мокрицький	2015	Kіnorob, Novye liudi, Derzhkіno («Кінороб», «Новые люди», Держкіно)
Under Electric Clouds (Pіd elektrychnymy hmaramy) (Під електричними хмарами)	Oleksii Herman Jr Олексій Герман мол.	2015	Metra Fіlmz, Lіnked Fіlmz, Derzhkіno (Метра Фільмз, Лінкед Філмз,Держкіно)
Song of songs (Pіsnia pіsen) (Пісня пісень)	Eva Neiman Єва Нейман	2015	1+1 Production
Captum (Polon) (Полон)	Anatolii Mateshko Анатолій Матешко	2015	Oleksandr Itygilov & Anton Sladkevych productions
Beyond (Po toi bіk) (По той бік)	Oleksandr Lytvynenko Олександр Литвиненко	2015	S13 Lytvynenko Films
The Deadly Alive (Smertelno zhyvyi) (Смертельно живий)	Maksim Stetskov Максим Стецков	2015	
Now I will love you (Teper ya budu liubyty tebe) (Тепер я буду любити тебе)	Roman Shirman Роман Ширман	2015	Іnterfіlm, Artizm Ltd, Derzhkіno «Інтерфільм», Artizm Ltd, Держкіно
Magical stories. The elixir of Kindness (Charіvnі іstorіi. Elіksyr dobroty) (Чарівні історії. Еліксир доброти)	Liliia Soldatenko Лілія Солдатенко	2015	Carrot Cake Studio
2016
#Futureinthepast	Oleksandr Shapiro Олександр Шапіро	2016	
SelfieParty	Liubomyr Levytskiu Любомир Левицький	2016	Vitamin Film Studio, Solar Media
Blue Dress (Blakytna suknia) (Блакитна сукня)	Ihor Minaiev Ігор Мінаєв	2016	Trempel Fіlmz («Тремпель Фільмз»)
Bremen Bandits Bremenskі rozbyshaky (Бременські розбишаки)	Oleksii Lukianchikov, Sviatoslav Ushakov Олексій Лук'янчіков, Святослав Ушаков	2016	(Star Medіa Dystrybiushn, Central Partnership) «Стар Медіа Дистрибьюшн», «Централ Партнершип»
Eight (Visim) (Вісім)	Oleksandr Shapiro Олександр Шапіро	2016	
The Nest of the Turtledove (Hnіzdo gorlytcі) (Гніздо горлиці)	Taras Tkachenko Тарас Ткаченко	2016	InsightMedіa, 4Rooms, Derzhkіno («ІнсайтМедіа», 4Rooms, Держкіно)
Alive (Zhyva) (Жива)	Taras Khymych Тарас Химич	2016	Invert Pictures
Competitor (Konkursant) (Конкурсант. Смертоносне шоу)	Oleksandr Bieliak Олександр Бєляк	2016	Vait films
The Dragon Spell (Mykyta Kozhumiaka) (Микита Кожум'яка)	Manuk Depoian Манук Депоян	2016	Panama Grand Prix, Derzhkіno
Valentine's night (Nіch sviatogo Valentyna) (Ніч святого Валентина)	Volodymyr Lert Володимир Лерт	2016	Panoptykum, Tauras Films Ukraine («Паноптикум», «Tauras Films Ukraine»)
My grandmother is Fanny Kaplan (Moia babusia Fanі Kaplan) (Моя бабуся Фані Каплан)	Olena Demianenko Олена Дем'яненко	2016	Gagarіn Medіa, Derzhkіno («Гагарін Медіа», Держкіно)
Autumn memories (Osіnnі spogady) (Осінні спогади)	Ali Fahr Mousavi Алі Фахр Мусаві	2016	Wilhelm Creative Center
Servant of the People 2 Sluga narodu 2 (Слуга народу 2)	Oleksii Kyriushchenko Олексій Кирющенко	2016	Kvartal-95 Studio («Студія Квартал-95»)
Chungul (Чунгул)	Oleksandr Alioshechkin, Viacheslav Alioshechkin Олександр Альошечкін, В'ячеслав Альошечкін	2016	Neo Planet
I'm with you (Ya z toboIu) (Я з тобою)	Oleh Turanskyi Олег Туранський	2016	Sister's production
If only (Yakby zh to) (Якби ж то)	Oleh Turanskyi Олег Туранський	2016	Star Media
2017
Infoholik (Інфоголік)	Valentyn Shpakov, Vladyslav Klymchuk Валентин Шпаков, Владислав Климчук	2017	NLO TV, Mamahohotala, Idea Production («НЛО TV», «Мамахохотала», «Idea Production»)
DZIDZIO Contrabass (DZIDZIO Контрабас)	Oleh Borshchevskyi Олег Борщевський	2017	Solar Media Entertainment
Izi (італ. Easy – Un viaggio facile facile Izi (Ізі)	Andrea Maniani Андреа Маньяні	2017	Fresh Production, Держкіно (Derzhkіno), Bartleby Film, Pilgrim Film (Італія)
The Gateway Brama (Брама)	Volodymyr Tykhyi Володимир Тихий	2017	Dyrektorіia Kіno, Derzhkіno («Директорія Кіно», Держкіно)
Frost Іnіi (Іній)	Sharunas Bartas Шарунас Бартас	2017	«Інсайт Медіа»( Іnsight Medіa), Tatofilm, Studija Kinema, КіnоЕlektron, Donten & Lacroix Films, Держкіно(Derzhkіno)
The Tale of Money Kazka pro groshі (Казка про гроші)	Olesya Morgunets Олеся Моргунець	2018	Dovzhenko Film Studio (Національна кіностудія художніх фільмів ім. О. П. Довженка)
Kazka staroho melnyka (Казка старого мельника)	Oleksandr Ityhilov Олександр Ітигілов	2017	Euromedia Company LLC, Derzhkіno (ТОВ «Євромедія Компані», Держкіно)
Cyborgs (Кіборги)	Akhtem Seitablaiev Ахтем Сеїтаблаєв	2017	Іdas Fіlm, Derzhkіno («Ідас філм», Держкіно)
Čiara Mezha (Межа)	Peter Bebiak Петер Беб'як	2017	ТОВ «Гарнет Інтернешнл Медіа Груп»" (Garnet Іnternational Medіa Group LLC) (Україна), Держкіно,( Derzhkіno) Wandal RTVS HomeMedia (Словаччина)
Peace to Your Home! Myr vashomy domy! Мир вашому дому!	Volodymyr Lert Володимир Лерт	2017	Lert Karnovskyi LLC, Derzhkіnо ТОВ «Лєрт Карновський», Держкіно(Derzhkіno)
Thinkers Myslytely (Мислителі)	Vincent Mettel Вінсент Меттель	2017	Guild of Independent Cinema of Ukraine Гільдія незалежного кіно України (ГНКУ)
The Traitor Zradnyk Зрадник	Mark Hammond Марк Гаммонд	2017	«Інсайт-Медіа» (Іnsight Medіa), Prim-Plan Studio, Temple Film, Держкіно(Derzhkіno)
The Fight Rules Pravylo boiu Правило бою	Oleksii Shapariev Олексій Шапарєв	2017	Good Morning Film, Garnet International Media Group
The Strayed Pryputnі Припутні	Arkadii Nepytaliuk Аркадій Непиталюк	2017	Star Media, Держкіно(Derzhkіno)
The Fifth Therapy 5 terapiya П'ята терапія	Alice Pavlovska Аліса Павловська	2017	Trumen production «Трумен продакшн»
Black level Rіven chornogo Рівень чорного	Valentyn Vasianovych Валентин Васянович	2017	Garmata Film
Funny Thing Rzhaka Ржака	Dmytro Tomashpolskyi Дмитро Томашпольський	2017	Gagarіn Medіa, Derzhkіno «Гагарін Медіа», Держкіно
Ugly Sіchen— berezen Січень — березень	Yurii Rechynskyi Юрій Речинський	2017	«Пронто Фільм» (Україна), Держкіно,( Pronto Fіlm (Ukraine), Derzhkіno)Novotny & Novotny Filmproduktion, Ulrich Zeidl Filmproduktion (Австрія)
The Stronghold Storozhova zastava Сторожова застава	Yurii Kovaliov Юрій Ковальов	2017	Kіnorob Studio, Film.ua Group, Derzhkіno Студія «Кінороб», Film.ua Group, Держкіно
Falling Strіmgolov Стрімголов	Maryna Stepanska Марина Степанська	2017	Insight-Medіa, Tatofіlm, Derzhkіno «Інсайт-Медіа», «Татофільм», Держкіно
Taras. Return Taras. Povernennia (Тарас. Повернення)	Oleksandr Denysenko Олександр Денисенко	2017	Insight-Medіa Derzhkіno ТОВ «ІнсайтМедіа», Держкіно
A Lesson of Magic Urok magiy (Урок Магії)	Lilia Soldatenko Лілія Солдатенко	2017	Carrot Cake Studio
Time of Chrysanthemum Chas khryzantem (Час хризантем)	Dmytro Moiseiev Дмитро Мойсеєв	2017	Yizhak-Fіlm «Їжак-фільм»
Red (Chervonyi) (Червоний)	Zaza Buadze Заза Буадзе	2017	Іnsight-Medіa, Odesa Film Studio, Derzhkіno, ARTBOX «Інсайт-Медіа», Одеська кіностудія, Держкіно, АRTBOX (Литва)
Stranger's Prayers Chuzha molytva (Чужа молитва)	Akhtem Seitablaiev Ахтем Сеїтаблаєв	2017	Іdas fіl, Derzhkіno «Ідас фільм», Держкіно
2018
Deserted country 20/20 Bezliudna kraina 20/20 Безлюдна країна	Kornii Hrytsiuk Корній Грицюк	2018	
DZIDZIO First Time DZIDZIO Pershii raz DZIDZIO Перший раз	Mykhailo Khoma, Taras Dron Михайло Хома, Тарас Дронь	2018	Dzidziofilm
Ecce Homo	Ganka Tertiak Ганка Тертяк	2018	Gankafilm
Bobot Бобот	Maksim Ksiondz Максим Ксьонда	2018	«М.Д.С. ЛТД», Держкіно Derzhkіno
The Stolen Princess Vykradena pryntcesa: Ruslan і Liudmyla Викрадена принцеса: Руслан і Людмила	Oleh Malamuzh Олег Маламуж	2018	Animagrad, Держкіно Derzhkіno
German: Vulkan Вулкан	Roman Bondarchuk Роман Бондарчук	2018	Tatofіlm, Derzhkіno «Татофільм», Держкіно
The hero of my time Герой мого часу	Antonina Noiabrova Антоніна Ноябрьова	2018	Держкіно Derzhkіno
Iceland: Kona fer í stríð Woman at war Hіrska zhіnka: na vіinі Гірська жінка: на війні	Benedict Erlingsson Бенедикт Ерлінґссон	2018	Solar Media Entertainment, Держкіно, (Derzhkіno)Slot Machine, Gulldrengurinn (Ісландія)
December's Tale, or St. Mykolai's Adventures Hrudneva kazka, abo Prygody of S. Mykolay Груднева казка, або Пригоди С. Миколая	Semen Horov Семен Горов	2018	Big Hand Films, Держкіно Derzhkіno
Wild Field Dyke pole Дике поле	Yaroslav Lodyhin Ярослав Лодигін	2018	Limelite, Film Brut
Donbas Донбас	Serhii Loznytsia Сергій Лозниця	2018	Arthouse Traffi, Держкіно,( Derzhkіno) Ma.ja.de. Fiction, JBA Production, Granite Film, Wild at Art, Digital Cube
Polish: Eter Efіr Ефір	Krzysztof Zanussi Кшиштоф Зануссі	2019	Іnterfіlm, Derzhkіno «Інтерфільм», Держкіно Derzhkіno
King Daniel Korol Danylo Король Данило	Taras Khymych Тарас Химич	2018	INVERT Pictures
When trees fall Koly padaiut dereva Коли падають дерева	Marysia Nikitiuk Марися Нікітюк	2018	Message Film, Fokus In, Solar Media Entertainment, Держкіно (Derzhkіno)
Legend of the Carpathians Legenda Karpat Легенда Карпат	Serhii Skobun Сергій Скобун	2018	Magnat Media Imprinting Emotions Coffeepost
The Hill of Hell Lysa gora Лиса гора	Roman Perfilev Роман Перфільєв	2018	Mediacont
Odesa Changeling Odeskii pіdkydko Одеський підкидько	Heorhiy Deliev Георгій Делієв	2018	
Call Sign Banderas Pozyvnii Banderas Позивний Бандерас	Zaza Buadze Заза Буадзе	2018	Try-ya-da Production, Derzhkіno «Три-я-да Продакшн», Держкіно
Murder porn Porno z vbyvstvom Порно з вбивством	Damir Yenaliev Дамір Єналієв	2018	Rain Poncho Film
Swingers Свінгери	Andrejs Ekis Андрейс Екіс	2018	F Films
Sex and nothing special Секс і нічого особистого	Olha Riashyna Ольга Ряшина	2018	Star Media «Стар медіа»
Crazy wedding Скажене весілля	Vlad Dykyi Влад Дикий	2018	Film.u», «Прототип продакшн» (Prototype Production), Держкіно (Derzhkіno)
C-note Sotka Сотка	Oleksandr Bielyak Олександр Бєляк	2018	VAIT FILMS
Simon Petliura's secret diary Таємний щоденник Симона Петлюри	Oles Yanchuk Олесь Янчук	2018	Dovzhenko Film Studio, Derzhkino Київська кіностудія художніх фільмів ім. О. П. Довженка, Держкіно
Terra Тера	Nikon Romanchenk Нікон Романченко	2018	Viatel LLC, Derzhkino ТОВ «Віател», Держкіно
Black Cossack Чорний козак	Vladyslav Chabaniuk Владислав Чабанюк	2018	Malva Studio, Toloka Lehedzyne NGO Студія «Мальва», ГО «Толока Легедзине».
Noble tramps Шляхетні волоцюги	Oleksandr Berezan Олександр Березань	2018	Ganza Film
Me. You. He. She Я, ти, він, вона	Volodymyr Zelenskyy, David Dodson Володимир Зеленський, Девід Додсон	2018	Kvartal 95 Studio, Derzhkino «Студія Квартал-95», Держкіно
2019
Morshyn's 11 11 дітей з Моршина	Arkadii Nepytaliuk Аркадій Непиталюк	2019	Solar Media Entertainment
Atlantis Atlantyda Атлантида	Valentyn Vasianovych Валентин Васянович	2019	Studio Garmata Film, Derzhkino «Студія Гармата фільм», Держкіно
Ksenia Guzul Hutsulka Ksenia Гуцулка Ксеня	Olena Demianenko Олена Дем'яненко	2019	Gagarin Media «Гагарін Медіа»
Homeward Dodomu Додому	Nariman Aliev Наріман Алієв	2019	
The Raid EKS Екс	Serhii Lysenko Сергій Лисенко	2019	Держкіно Derzhkino
Forbidden Zaboronenyi Заборонений	Roman Brovko Роман Бровко	2019	UM-GROUP
The Rising Hawk Zakhar Berkut Захар Беркут	Akhtem Seitablaiev Ахтем Сеітаблаєв	2019	Kinorob, Cinema Day «Кінороб», «Cinema Day»
A Meeting of Classmates Zustrich odnoklasnykiv Зустріч однокласників	Valentyn Shpakov, Alya Buhtiiarova Валентин Шпаков, Аля Бухтіярова	2019	
Kruty:1918 Крути 1918	Oleksii Shaparev Олексій Шапарев	2019	Good Morning Films
Morena Морена	Serhii Alioshechkin Сергій Альошечкін	2019	«Ganzafilm Production», Держкіно(Derzhkino)
My Thoughts Are Silent Moi dumky tykhi Мої думки тихі	Antonio Lukic Антоніо Лукіч	2019	Toy Cinema, Держкіно (Derzhkino)
Поліна і таємниця кіностудії Polina and the mystery of a film studio	Olias Barco Оліас Барко	2019	Kinorob, Derzhkino «Кінороб», Держкіно
Producer Продюсер	Serge Vane Сергій Вейн	2019	Firework Sound
The Painted Bird Pofarbovane Ptashenia Пофарбоване пташеня	Václav Marhoul Вацлав Маргоул	2019	Держкіно(Derzhkino)
Swingers 2 Svinhery 2 Свінгери 2	Andrejs Ekis Андрейс Екіс	2019	F Films
Squat32 Сквот32	Oleksandr Lidahovskyi Олександр Лідаговський	2019	Garnet International Media Group, Держкіно (Derzhkino)
Parthenon Stásis Стасіс	Mantas Kvedaravicius Мантас Кведаравічюс	2019	ESSE Production House, Studio Uljana Kim (Литва), Rouge International (Франція), Держкіно(Derzhkino)
Eastman Skhidniak Східняк	Andrii Ivaniuk Андрій Іванюк	2019	
Only a Miracle Tilky dyvo Тільки Диво	Olena Karetnyk Олена Каретник	2019	Kazka Production («Казка Продакшн»), Держкіно (Derzhkino)
Toloka Толока	Mykhailo Illienko Михайло Ілєєнко	2019	Держкіно Derzhkino
Present Continuum Tut i Teper Тут і тепер	Oleksandr Shapiro Олександр Шапіро	2019	
Chola the Bear Ursus Урсус	Otar Shamatava Отар Шаматава	2019	Fresh Production Group, Media Group Ukraine, TRK Ukraina (Ukraine), Studio О (Georgia), Geopoly (Bulgaria), Aktis Film Production (Germany), Georgian National Film Center, German Film Fund MDM (Mitteldeutsche Medienfrderung GmbH), Bulgarian National Film Centre, Derzhkino «Fresh Production Group», «Медіа Група Україна», телеканал «Україна» (Україна), Studio О (Грузія), Geopoly (Болгарія), Aktis Film Production (Німеччина), Національний кіноцентр Грузії, Німецький кінофонду MDM (Mitteldeutsche Medienfrderung GmbH), Болгарський національний центр кіно, Держкіно
Foxter & Max Фокстер і Макс	Anatolii Mateshko Анатолій Матешко	2019	Pronto Film
Mr Jones Tsina Pravdy (Gareth Jones) Ціна правди (Гарет Джонс)	Agnieszka Holland Агнешка Голланд	2019	«Кінороб»(Kinorob), Film.ua Group, Film Production, Crab Apple Film
U312 Cherkasy U311 Черкаси	Tymur Yashchenko Тимур Ященко	2019	

== See also ==
- Cinema of Ukraine
- All-Ukrainian Photo Cinema Administration

== Sources ==
- Госейко Любомир, «Історія українського кінематографа. 1896—1995», К.: KINO-КОЛО, 2005. ISBN 966-8864-00-X.
- «Нариси історії кіномистецтва України», Редкол.: В.Сидоренко та ін., Інститут проблем сучасного мистецтва Академія мистецтв України, Інтертехнологія, 2006.
- Брюховецька Лариса, «Приховані фільми. Українське кіно 1990–х», К.: АртЕк, 2003. ISBN 966-505-043-5.
- Фільми України 1992–1996. Каталог. / К., 1996—112 с.
- Фільми України 1997–2000. Каталог / К. — 2000—214 с.
- Фільми України. 2001–2004. Каталог / К. — 2005—282 с.
- Фільми України. 2005–2008. Каталог / К. — 2009—284 с.
- Фільми України. 2009–2012. Каталог / К. — Національна спілка кінематографістів України, 2013—100 с.
- Ukrainian films 2008–09. Щорічний каталог кінопродукції / Ukrainian Cinema Foundation
- Ukrainian Film Guide. 2011–2012. Berlinale, 2012. Каталог
- Українські фільми 2012–2013. Каталог / Ukrainian State Film Agency
- Ukrainian Documentary Films 2013–2015. Каталог
- Українські фільми 2015/2016
- International Film Guide. 2009. 45th Edition. London & New York: Wallflower Press 2009, ISBN 978-1-905674-99-2
- International Film Guide. 2010. 46th Edition. London & New York: Wallflower Press, 2010, ISBN 978-1-906660-38-3
- Pethő, Ágnes. The Cinema of Sensations. Newcastle upon Tyne: Cambridge Scholars Press, 2015, ISBN 978-1-4438-6883-9, ISBN 1-4438-6883-3
- Anthelme Vidaud (2023). Ciné-Ukraine: histoire(s) d’indépendance (in French). ISBN 978-2-493524-08-9. OL 52236371M. Wikidata Q122988520.
