= Hidden City =

Hidden City or The Hidden City may refer to:

== Film and television ==
- Bomba and the Hidden City, a 1951 American film directed by Ford Beebe
- Hidden City (film), a 1987 British film directed by Stephen Poliakoff
- The Hidden City (film), a documentary film directed by Víctor Moreno
- "The Hidden City", a 1989 episode of science program Nova

== Literature ==
- The Hidden City, an 1891 novel by Walt McDougall
- The Hidden City, a 1930 novel by Philip Gibbs
- The Hidden City, a 1990 novel by Charles de Lint
- The Hidden City (novel), a 1995 fantasy novel by David Eddings

== Other uses ==
- Hidden City (album), a 2016 album by the Cult
- Hidden city ticketing, an airline booking technique
- [Hidden City (video game)] a 2015 game produced by G5 Entertainment
