= Luxembourg, Luxembourg (film) =

- Directed by: Antonio Lukich
- Screenplay by: Antonio Lukich
- Starring: Amil and Ramil Nasirov
- Cinematography: Mykhailo Lubarskyi
- Release date: 2022
- Country: Ukraine
- Language: Ukrainian (including surzhyk)

Luxembourg, Luxembourg (Ukrainian: Люксембург, Люксембург, romanized: Liuksemburh, Liuksemburh) is a 2022 Ukrainian comedy film written and directed by Antonio Lukich.

The film premiered at the Horizons section of the 79th edition of the Venice Film Festival. It was later screened at the Toronto International Film Festival.

== Plot ==
The twin brothers Kolya and Vasya are the sons of a gangster originally from Yugoslavia. The film begins with a flashback to the 1990s, when the brothers were playing hooky at school and Kolya, while playing, found himself in a freight train. Vasya ran to his father for help and he stopped the train. Kolya loved his father, but was ashamed to tell him about it.

The action moves to 2018. Kolya has become a minibus driver, lives with his mother and has a bad back; Vasya is a police officer, he is married and has a small child. After a fight with another driver, his boss (Kolya's stepfather) punishes him by giving him a month's suspension to drive a different route. The very first day turns out to be problematic, with almost all the passengers asking for pension certificates. Meanwhile, Vasya is called to calm down a violent man. Then he visits his wife's father to inform him of his intention to study to become an investigator. The latter is against the training because he believes that Vasya should take care of his family.

Kolya receives a call from the consulate in Luxembourg and is informed that his father is dying. The brothers' mother believes that the bandit father, who abandoned the family, should be left to die. Kolya decides to go to him. Vasya, who is contrary in nature, is convinced that it is unnecessary to visit their father, whom they hardly know.

Against his mother's wishes, Kolya decides to visit his father, whom he sees as his only friend. However, a series of events prevent the trip. While attending back treatment, Kolya meets "Uncle Slava," an acquaintance of his father's who tells him a completely different story from what Kolya knew. Then, while getting on a minibus driven by Kolya, an elderly woman, Larisa Petrovna, is injured. He faces house arrest. After an attempt to escape, Kolya is arrested and fitted with a bracelet to track his whereabouts.

Kolya decides to reconcile with Larisa Petrovna, but he does it awkwardly and she refuses his help. As a result, Vasya is denied a promotion. Larisa Petrovna, who finds it difficult to take care of herself, decides to call Kolya. He cooks her meals, helps her at work in the bakery, and drives her around town. Gradually, he becomes closer to her and her fellow pensioners. Kolya accepts that he may have to take care of his father in the same way. But later it turns out that Kolya was selling drugs. He is now facing a real prison sentence of 5 years. Vasya's colleague advises him to make sure that his brother "disappears" from the police's sight. The situation is complicated by Kolya's quarrel with a toy seller, because Kolya stole the toy (which was defective). Vasya decides to take his brother to Luxembourg as soon as possible.

Finally, the brothers arrive in Luxembourg. Kolya looks for his father without waiting for permission to visit the ward, so the brothers are kicked out of the hospital. Thanks to the help of an embassy employee, the brothers find out that their father died a few days ago. They decide to visit their father's home. Kolya believes that now he will receive a large inheritance. But in reality, their father lived poorly, working as a security guard and losing his salary on bets. The brothers say goodbye to their father's body in the morgue, but it remains in doubt whether it is him (he had a tattoo). Taking Vasya's phone, Kolya accidentally learns about the threat of arrest in Ukraine. He makes peace with his brother, realizing that he wanted to save him from prison, and stays in Luxembourg.

== Cast ==
- Amil Nasirov as Kolya
- Ramil Nasirov as Vasya
- Liudmyla Sachenko as Larysa Petrivna

== Reception ==
On Rotten Tomatoes, the film has an approval rating of 83% based on 6 reviews.
