= The Man of the Future =

- Promotional release poster
- Directed by: Felipe Ríos Fuentes
- Written by: Felipe Ríos Fuentes
- Produced by: Catalina Vergara; Fernando Bascuñán; Pablo Sanhueza
- Starring: José Soza; Antonia Giesen
- Cinematography: Eduardo Bunster
- Edited by: Nicolás Goldbart; Valeria Hernández
- Music by: Alejandro Kauderer
- Production companies: Quijote Films; Sagrado Cine; Unión de los Ríos
- Release dates: July 3, 2019 (Karlovy); August 29, 2019 (Chile)
- Running time: 92 minutes
- Countries: Chile; Argentina
- Language: Spanish

The Man of the Future (Spanish: El hombre del futuro) is a 2019 Chilean-Argentine drama road movie written and directed by Felipe Ríos Fuentes in his directorial debut. Starring José Soza and Antonia Giesen. Its world premiere was at the 54th Karlovy Vary International Film Festival where it competed for the Crystal Globe.

== Synopsis ==
After a forced retirement, the old and lonely trucker Michelsen undertakes one last trip aboard his truck to Villa O'Higgins, the so-called end of the world by the southern truckers. Along the way, he will detach himself from everything that made up his life, turning his last route into a journey of illumination, in which facing the end of the road and the wild nature will allow him to live the present as he always wanted: with his daughter Elena.

== Cast ==
The actors participating in this film are:

- José Soza as Michelsen
- Antonia Giesen as Elena
- Sergio Hernández as Boss
- Rubén Redlich as Gaucho Sheep
- Roberto Farías as Four Fingers
- Amparo Noguera as Nicole
- Giannina Fruttero as Paula
- Jorge Arecheta as Tecla
- Erto Pantoja as Nicole's Husband
- Solange Lackington as Olivia
- María Alché as Maxi
- Nicolás Rojas as Elena's Friend
- Luis Uribe as Trainer

== Release ==
It had its world premiere on July 3, 2019, at the 54th Karlovy Vary International Film Festival, then it was screened on August 21 of the same year at the Santiago International Film Festival. It was commercially released on August 29, 2019, in Chilean theaters.

== Accolades ==
Year	Award / Festival	Category	Recipient	Result	Ref.
2019	Karlovy Vary International Film Festival	Crystal Globe	The Man of the Future	Nominated	
2019	Karlovy Vary International Film Festival	Special Jury Mention - Promising New Talent	Antonia Giesen	Won	
2019	Santiago International Film Festival	Best International Film	The Man of the Future	Nominated	
2021	Caleuche Awards	Best Leading Actress	Antonia Giesen	Won	
2021	Caleuche Awards	Best Leading Actor	José Soza	Won	
