= Bonifacio Angius =

Italian filmmaker (born 1982)

- Born: 12 June 1982 (age 43); Sassari, Italy
- Occupation: Film director

Bonifacio Angius (born 12 June 1982) is an Italian film director, screenwriter and producer.

== Life and career ==
Born in Sassari, Angius studied at the New York Film Academy and at the Catalonian Centre for Cinema Studies. In 2013, he founded the production company Monello Film. After some shorts, he made his directorial feature debut with Perfidia, which premiered at the 67th Locarno Film Festival, in which it won the Youth Jury Award for Best Director. The film was also screened at various international festivals including Montreal International Film Festival and Filmfest Hamburg, and got a Jury Special Mention at the Annecy Italian Film Festival.

Angius's following film, Wherever You Are, premiered at the Torino Film Festival, and was later screened at the 54th Karlovy Vary International Film Festival and at the Santa Barbara International Film Festival, among others. It got Angius a Silver Ribbon nomination for Best Original Story. In 2019, Angius directed the short film Destino, which served as Special closing event of the Critics' Week at the 76th Venice International Film Festival. In 2021, Angius' third feature The Giants premiered at the 74th Locarno Film Festival. For this film, Angius got a Ciak d'Oro nomination for best director.

== Filmography ==
- Perfidia (2014)
- Domenica (short, 2016)
- Wherever You Are (2018)
- Destino (short, 2019)
- The Giants (2021)
- Confession – How I Found Out I Wouldn't Make the Revolution (2025)
