= The Father (2019 film) =

2019 film by Kristina Grozeva and Petar Valchanov

- Theatrical release poster
- Directed by: Kristina Grozeva; Petar Valchanov
- Written by: Kristina Grozeva; Decho Taralezhkov; Petar Valchanov
- Produced by: Kristina Grozeva; Konstantina Stavrianou; Petar Valchanov; Irini Vougioukalou
- Starring: Ivan Barnev; Ivan Savov; Tanya Shahova
- Cinematography: Krum Rogriguez
- Edited by: Petar Valchanov
- Music by: Hristo Namliev
- Production companies: Abraxas Film; Graal Films
- Release dates: 2 July 2019 (Karlovy Vary); 11 September 2020 (Spain)
- Running time: 87 minutes
- Countries: Bulgaria; Greece
- Language: Bulgarian

The Father (Bulgarian: Бащата) is a 2019 Bulgarian-Greek comedy-drama film directed by Kristina Grozeva and Petar Valchanov. The film premiered at the 54th Karlovy Vary International Film Festival where it won the Crystal Globe award for best film. It was selected as the Bulgarian entry for the Best International Feature Film at the 93rd Academy Awards, but it was not nominated.

== Plot ==
Vasil has just lost his long-time partner in life, his wife Valentina. His son, advertising photographer Pavel, who has driven out to his childhood hometown from the city where he works, arrives late to her funeral. Sidling apologetically to the graveside through the thicket of more respectful mourners, he joins his stiffly resentful father Vasil by the open casket. And then his phone, set to a frog-ribbit ringtone, goes off in his pocket. When a woman at the funeral proclaims that the dead woman called her cell phone, Vasil seeks out the help of a well-known psychic in order to contact his wife.

With the very best of intentions, Pavel has lied to everybody: to Vasil about the reason for his wife's absence from the funeral; to his wife, whom he only speaks to on the phone, about where he is and why; and to his assistant at work who is running down the clock on an advertising job with a tricky client. The evasions and falsehoods snow down thicker when Vasil’s unexpected interest in the gimcrackery of a local guru/charlatan, who claims to be able to commune with the dead, means that Pavel has to delay his return. Pavel tries to bring him to his senses, but Vasil stubbornly insists on doing things his own way. Eventually Pavel is trapped in a blizzard of white lies.

== Cast ==
- Ivan Barnev as Pavel
- Ivan Savov as Vasil
- Tanya Shahova as Lyubka
- Hristofor Nedkov as Doctor
- Margita Gosheva as Kalina
- Ivanka Bratoeva as Valentina
  - Maria Bakalova as young Valentina

== Reception ==
=== Critical response ===
On Rotten Tomatoes, the film has an approval rating of 100% based on 14 reviews, with an average rating of 7.4/10.

Jessica Kiang for Variety noted that the film "occupies a lighter, gentler register" than Grozeva and Valchanov's previous works and called it their "most pleasantly accessible film to date". Writing for Screen Daily, Demetrios Matheou found The Father to be "a supremely well-honed comedy, segueing between farce and satire". Anna Smith of Deadline Hollywood praised the film's comedic timing, but critiqued the lack of presence of its female characters. The Hollywood Reporter's Stephen Dalton described the film as a "humane, compassionate, character-driven delight".

=== Accolades ===
Award	Date of ceremony	Category	Recipient(s)	Result	Ref(s)
Karlovy Vary International Film Festival	6 July 2019	Crystal Globe	The Father	Won	
El Gouna Film Festival	27 September 2019	Feature Narrative Competition	The Father	Nominated	
Tirana International Film Festival	3 October 2019	Best Feature Film	The Father	Won	
Golden Rose Film Festival	4 October 2019	Best Film	The Father	Won	
Golden Rose Film Festival	4 October 2019	Best Screenplay	Kristina Grozeva, Decho Taralezhkov, Petar Valchanov	Won	
Golden Rose Film Festival	4 October 2019	Danny Lerner Award	The Father	Won	
Golden Rose Film Festival	4 October 2019	Best Actor Award	Ivan Barnev, Ivan Savov	Won	
Haifa International Film Festival	21 October 2019	Carmel International Competition	The Father	Nominated	
Valladolid International Film Festival	26 October 2019	Golden Spike	The Father	Nominated	
Minsk International Film Festival	8 November 2019	Best Film	The Father	Nominated	
Trieste Film Festival	21 January 2020	Best Feature Film	The Father	Won	
Sofia Film Fest	31 March 2020	Balkan Competition	The Father	Nominated	
Cleveland International Film Festival	5 April 2020	George Gund III Competition	The Father	Nominated	
Grande Prêmio do Cinema Brasileiro	29 November 2021	Best International Film	The Father	Nominated	

== See also ==
- List of submissions to the 93rd Academy Awards for Best International Feature Film
- List of Bulgarian submissions for the Academy Award for Best International Feature Film
