= Lendita Zeqiraj =

Kosovan film director

Lendita Zeqiraj is a film director born in Pristina, Kosovo.

== Career ==
In 2008, she released the short film Balcony. In 2018, her short film Fence ("Gardhi") won Best International Short Film at DokuFest. It also won Best Narrative Short at the Hamptons International Film Festival and the New Orleans Film Festival.

Her debut feature film, Aga's House, is about a young boy looking for his father and about trauma and rape survivors, set after the Kosovo War.
