= Villen Novak =

Ukrainian film director (1938–2026)

- Віллен Новак
- Born: 3 January 1938; Hlezne, Zhytomyr Oblast, Ukrainian SSR, Soviet Union
- Died: 29 March 2026 (aged 88)
- Occupation: Film director

Villen Zakharovych Novak (Ukrainian: Віллен Захарович Новак; 3 January 1938 – 29 March 2026) was a Ukrainian film director. He died on 29 March 2026, at the age of 88.
