= Antonio Lukich =

Ukrainian film director

- Антоніо Лукіч
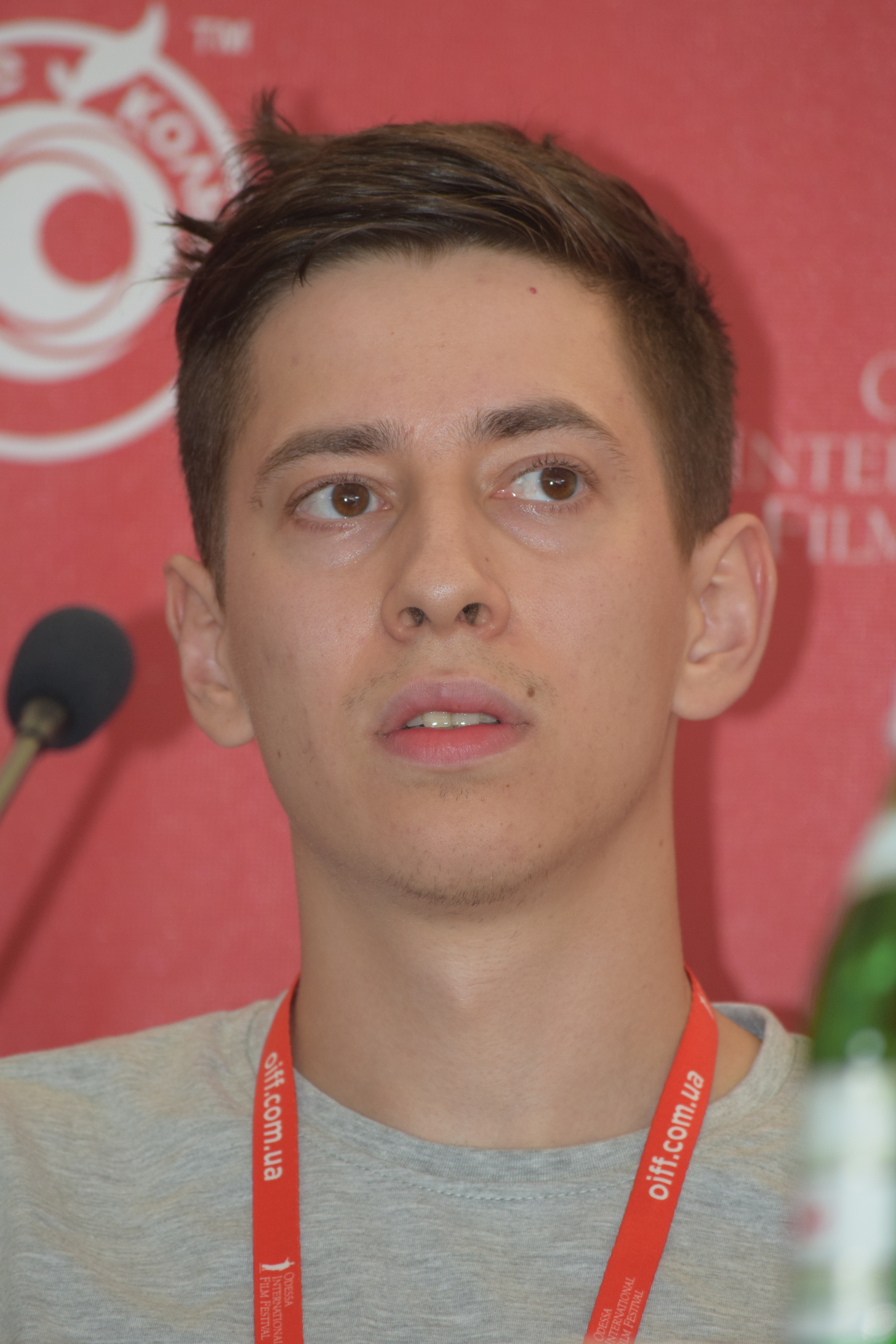
- Born: 1992 (age 33–34); Uzhhorod, Ukraine
- Education: Kyiv National Ivan Karpenko-Karyi Theatre, Cinema and Television University
- Notable work: It Was Showering In Manchester, My Thoughts Are Silent
- Awards: Merited Artist of Ukraine

Antonio Lukić (Ukrainian: Антоніо Лукіч), known professionally as Antonio Lukich, is a Ukrainian filmmaker who was born in Uzhhorod, Ukraine. Throughout his career, Antonio has achieved much success, gaining awards at an international and nationally recognised level. One such award is the Merited Artist of Ukraine awarded to him in March, 2021. This state honorary decoration is awarded to those who make significant contributions and achieve notable success in film and art for the country of Ukraine.

== Biography ==
Antonio was born in 1992 in Uzhhorod. In 2011–2015, he studied at the Karpenko-Karyi Kyiv National University and received a bachelor's degree in directing (studying with Volodymyr Oseledchyk).

Lukich's first film, Fish of Lake Baikal (2014), won the "Best Documentary Award" at the CineRail International Film Festival in Paris. His graduation film, It Was Showering in Manchester, went on to win Best Short Film at the 2016 Odesa International Film Festival.

In 2019, his debut full-length feature film My Thoughts Are Silent was released. In 2023, his second feature film, Luxembourg, Luxembourg premiered in Ukraine.

== Films ==
=== Student films ===
Is It Easy to Be Young? – 2011

Hello, Sister! – 2012

Fish of Lake Baikal – 2013

Who Framed Kim Kuzin? – 2014

It Was Showering in Manchester, 2016 — Best Short Film at the 2016 Odesa International Film Festival.

=== Filmography ===
Рік	Film	Acted as:			Type
Рік	Film	Director	Screenwriter	Actor	Type
2019	My Thoughts Are Silent	Yes	Yes	cameo	Feature film
2019	Kings of Chambers	Yes	—N/a	—N/a	TV series
2020	Sex, Insta, and ZNO	Yes	—N/a	cameo	Web series
2022	Luxembourg, Luxembourg	Yes	Yes	—N/a	Feature film
TBA	My Thoughts Are Silent 2	Yes	Yes	—N/a	Feature film

== Awards and nominations ==
List of awards and nominations
Awards	Year	Category	Nominated work	Rezult	Source
Santa Monica International Film Festival	2021	Best International Feature Film	My Thoughts Are Silent	Won	
Golden Dzyga	2020	Best film	My Thoughts Are Silent	Won	
Golden Dzyga	2020	Best directing	My Thoughts Are Silent	Nominated	
Golden Dzyga	2020	best scenario	My Thoughts Are Silent	Won	
Golden Dzyga	2020	Discovery of the year	My Thoughts Are Silent	Won	
Award from "Ukrainska Pravda"	2020	Artist of the year	My Thoughts Are Silent	Won	
Kinokolo	2019	Discovery of the year	My Thoughts Are Silent	Won	
Kinokolo	2019	Best directing	My Thoughts Are Silent	Nominated	
Kinokolo	2019	Best feature film	My Thoughts Are Silent	Nominated	
Karlovy Vary International Film Festival	2019	East of West Award, special jury prize	My Thoughts Are Silent	Won	
Raindance Film Festival	2019	Discovery award – best debut feature	My Thoughts Are Silent	Won	

== See also ==
- My Thoughts Are Silent
- Luxembourg, Luxembourg
