= My Thoughts Are Silent =

2019 Ukrainian comedy-drama film

- Release poster
- Directed by: Antonio Lukich
- Written by: Valeria Kalchenko; Antonio Lukich
- Starring: Andriy Lidahovskiy; Irma Vitovska-Vantsa
- Release date: July 4, 2019
- Running time: 104 minutes
- Country: Ukraine
- Language: Ukrainian

My Thoughts Are Silent (2019) (Ukrainian: «Мої думки тихі», romanized: Moi dumky tykhi) is a Ukrainian comedy-drama film by director Antonio Lukich. The film was first shown on 4 July 2019, during the East of West (Karlovy Vary) section of the 54th Karlovy Vary International Film Festival, where it won the Special Jury Prize.

The film was released in Ukraine on 16 January 2020. For seven weeks in the box office box office receipts amounted to more than ₴10 million. It ranks 20th in the list of the 100 best films in the history of Ukrainian cinema.

== Plot ==
The film examines the eternal problem of parents and children. The protagonist works as a sound engineer and musician, encounters a lot of problems and has many setbacks. The same crisis awaits him in his personal life. A Canadian company invites him to record the sounds of Ukrainian animals in Transcarpathia. He fulfills the assignment with enthusiasm and creativity, but his mother comes along and constantly disturbs and distracts him. If he manages to record the voice of a rare Rakhiv mallard, he may be able to leave "uncomfortable Ukraine" and travel to "attractive Canada."

== Cast ==
- Andriy Lidahovskiy — Vadim, sound engineer
- Irma Vitovska-Vantsa — Vadim's mom, taxi driver in Uzhhorod

== Production ==
=== Estimate ===
In June 2017, the film was one of the winners of the 10th Derzhkino Competition. The film received state funding of ₴8.9 million out of a total estimate of ₴9.2 million. Filming began in Ukraine in March 2018. Filming took place in Kyiv, in the Carpathians Mountains, and in the Zakarpattia Oblast.

=== Music ===
Most of the money was spent on music, with a total cost of almost $10,000. The authors of the film acquired the rights to the song Spice Girls Viva Forever. The song became the most expensive item of expenses not by chance, because the main character wants to live like Victoria Beckham, because she is in love with her. Because of this, her song was identified as the key in the tape. For this purpose, the female ensemble of the chamber choir “Inspiratum” of the Procathedral Cathedral of St. Alexander, which is located in Kyiv on Kostyolnaya Street, recorded a version for the film. The melody of the mallard's call is from the Rozz Dyliams song "Galeforce Beach". His song "Latitudes" is also played in the movie during the pool scene.

== Release ==
=== Festival release ===
The film was first shown on 4 July 2019 at the East of West section of the 54th Karlovy Vary International Film Festival. There, the movie "My Thoughts Are Silent" received a Special Jury Award. In Ukraine, the premiere of the film took place during the Odesa International Film Festival, where Antonio Lukich's work received the Audience Award, the FIPRESCI Award for Best Ukrainian Film, the Award for Best Actor (Irma VItovska-Vantsa).

=== Movie release ===
The movie rental in Ukraine took place on 16 January 2020. The distributor made a re-release of the tape on 5 March 2020 in Ukraine on the occasion of International Women's Day.

=== Box office ===
The movie was released in Ukraine in 91 cinemas and for the first week from 16 January to 22 January 2020 the comedy was watched by 29 thousand viewers and the fees amounted to almost ₴2.8 million. In the second week film release reduced to 74 cinemas and at the end of the second week, the total number of movie views was 52.3 thousand viewers, and the total box office was ₴5.0 million. Though the film earned more than ₴ 9.4 million at the box office in Ukraine.
