= The Hidden City (film) =

2018 documentary film

- Promotional release poster
- Directed by: Víctor Moreno
- Cinematography: José Ángel Alayón
- Edited by: Samuel M. Delgado
- Production companies: El Viaje Films; Rinoceronte Films; Pomme Hurlante Films; Dirk Manthey Films; Kino Pravda
- Release date: November 2018 (SEFF)
- Running time: 80 minutes
- Countries: Spain; Germany; France
- Language: Spanish

The Hidden City (Spanish: La Ciudad Oculta) is a 2018 documentary film directed by Víctor Moreno. The film explores the underground infrastructure beneath Madrid, Spain, including sewers, pipes, train tunnels, and man-made corridors, with appearances by maintenance workers, animals, and commuters.

An international co-production between Spain, Germany and France, The Hidden City premiered at the Seville European Film Festival in November 2018.

== Synopsis ==
The Hidden City consists primarily of footage of subterranean structures and systems beneath Madrid, Spain, both filmed by director of photography José Ángel Alayón and by surveillance cameras. Elements presented include train tracks and tunnels; sewer pipes and dripping brick walls; underground workers; animals—such as an owl, cockroaches, rats, and feral cats; human commuters travelling by metro; and microscopic views of microorganisms in sewage water. The film features no dialogue aside from occasional commands received by portable communicators.

== Production ==
In a 2019 interview with Variety, Víctor Moreno stated: "There were three particularly significant difficulties [with filming underground]. The first was obtaining permits that were delayed for about a year as they involved many institutions. The second was the long process of searching for locations since it was a very large space, of which there are hardly any references, and which is as big as the above-ground city. And the third was the filming itself, because it involved shooting in spaces with very difficult access, with heavy equipment and little or no mobility."

== Reception ==
On Rotten Tomatoes, the film has a score of 100% based on six reviews, with an average rating of 8.5/10.

Javier Ocaña of El País praised the film for its "formidable photographic and sound work", and wrote that "Víctor Moreno has created an unusual and identifiable style, of extreme solidity and beauty". Cinemanía's Carlos Marañón gave the film a score of four-and-a-half out of five stars, calling it "an underground space odyssey".

Jonathan Holland, writing for The Hollywood Reporter, commended the film's audio as "extraordinary, a detailed and carefully worked symphony of engineering noises", and called the film as a whole "a mood piece that's as much an experience as a movie — [which] has the rare and impressive virtue of slightly rearranging our perspective as we emerge afterwards, blinking." Variety's Jamie Lang wrote that "Moreno goes deep into the unseen tunnels, metros and sewers that support life for the millions above, juxtaposing that world with the one seen every day. Lack of light or color, otherworldly sounds and machinery and nocturnal animals inhabit the dark corridors in a cinematic experience that begs to be enjoyed in a pitch-black theater with high-quality speakers."
