= Undercover (Bulgarian TV series) season 2 =

Undercover
- Season 2
- No. of episodes: 12

Release
- Original network: BNT 1
- Original release: November 20, 2011 – February 5, 2012

Season chronology
- ← Previous; Season 1 Next → Season 3

The second season of Undercover premiered on BNT 1 on November 20, 2011, and ended on February 5, 2012.

== Plot ==
Popov finds out who is Dzharo's inside man, but the inside man is actually inside man of US Secret Service in Dzharo's group. Nikolov and Sunny are killed. Popov's and Dzharo's former college Mironov returns from the dead, Dzharo got a new sociate Anton Damyanov and Neshev replaced Nikolov.

== Cast ==
=== Main ===
- Ivaylo Zahariev as Martin Hristov
- Irena Miliankova as Silvia Veleva - Sunny (episodes 1–9)
- Zahary Baharov as Ivo Andonov
- Vladimir Penev as Inspector Emil Popov
- Mihail Bilalov as Petar Tudzharov - Dzharo
- Hristo Mutafchiev as Alexander Mironov (episodes 1–11)
- Alexander Sano as Zdravko Kiselov - The Hair
- Deyan Donkov as Vasil Nikolov (episodes 1–4)
- Kiril Efremov as Tihomir Gardev - Tisho the Twin
- Ventsislav Yankov as Nikolay Rashev - Niki the Twin
- Tzvetana Maneva as Cveta Andonova (episodes 3–9)
- Petar Popyordanov as Momchil Neshev (episodes 5–12)
- Georgi Staykov as Anton Damyanov (episodes 3–12)
- Marian Valev as Rosen Gatzov - The Hook

=== Recurring ===
- Ivaylo Hristov as Kiril Hristov (episode 5)

== Episodes ==
| No. overall | No. in season | Title | Directed by | Written by | Original release date |
|---|---|---|---|---|---|
| 13 | 1 | "Episode 2.1" | Victor Bozhinov | Vanya Nikolova & Yordan Bankov | November 20, 2011 |
| 14 | 2 | "Episode 2.2" | Victor Bozhinov | Vanya Nikolova & Yordan Bankov | November 27, 2011 |
| 15 | 3 | "Episode 2.3" | Dimitar Gotchev | Vanya Nikolova & Yordan Bankov | December 4, 2011 |
| 16 | 4 | "Episode 2.4" | Dimitar Gotchev | Vanya Nikolova & Yordan Bankov | December 11, 2011 |
| 17 | 5 | "Episode 2.5" | Victor Bozhinov | Vanya Nikolova & Yordan Bankov | December 18, 2011 |
| 18 | 6 | "Episode 2.6" | Victor Bozhinov | Vanya Nikolova & Yordan Bankov | December 25, 2011 |
| 19 | 7 | "Episode 2.7" | Dimitar Gotchev | Vanya Nikolova & Yordan Bankov | January 1, 2012 |
| 20 | 8 | "Episode 2.8" | Dimitar Gotchev | Vanya Nikolova & Yordan Bankov | January 8, 2012 |
| 21 | 9 | "Episode 2.9" | Victor Bozhinov | Vanya Nikolova & Yordan Bankov | January 15, 2012 |
| 22 | 10 | "Episode 2.10" | Victor Bozhinov | Vanya Nikolova & Yordan Bankov | January 22, 2012 |
| 23 | 11 | "Episode 2.11" | Victor Bozhinov | Vanya Nikolova & Yordan Bankov | January 29, 2012 |
| 24 | 12 | "Episode 2.12" | Victor Bozhinov | Vanya Nikolova & Yordan Bankov | February 5, 2012 |
