= Undercover (Bulgarian TV series) season 1 =

Undercover
- Season 1
- No. of episodes: 12

Release
- Original network: BNT 1
- Original release: April 17 – July 3, 2011

Season chronology
- Next → Season 2

The first season of Undercover premiered on BNT 1 on April 17, 2011 and ended on July 3, 2011.

== Plot ==
Martin, the ex-con, is infiltrated by the police into a criminal group owned by Petar Tudzharov "Dzharo" to provide information about them. Martin later informs inspector Popov that Dzharo has an inside man in the police.

== Cast ==
=== Main ===
- Ivaylo Zahariev as Martin Hristov
- Irena Miliankova as Silvia Veleva - Sunny
- Zahary Baharov as Ivo Andonov
- Vladimir Penev as Inspector Emil Popov
- Mihail Bilalov as Petar Tudzharov - Dzharo
- Alexander Sano as Zdravko Kiselov - The Hair
- Deyan Donkov as Vasil Nikolov
- Kiril Efremov as Tihomir Gardev - Tisho the Twin
- Ventsislav Yankov as Nikolay Rashev - Niki the Twin
- Ivaylo Hristov as Kiril Hristov
- Marian Valev as Rosen Gatzov - The Hook

=== Recurring ===
- Hristo Mutafchiev as Alexander Mironov (episodes 10-12)
- Tzvetana Maneva as Cveta Andonova (episodes 2, 6-7, 10, 12)

== Episodes ==
No. overall	No. in season	Title	Directed by	Written by	Original release date
1	1	"Episode 1.1"	Dimitar Mitovski	Teodora Vassileva & Georgi Ivanov	April 17, 2011
2	2	"Episode 1.2"	Victor Bozhinov	Teodora Vassileva & Georgi Ivanov	April 24, 2011
3	3	"Episode 1.3"	Dimitar Gotchev	Teodora Vassileva & Georgi Ivanov	May 1, 2011
4	4	"Episode 1.4"	Dimitar Gotchev	Teodora Vassileva & Georgi Ivanov	May 8, 2011
5	5	"Episode 1.5"	Victor Bozhinov	Teodora Vassileva & Georgi Ivanov	May 15, 2011
6	6	"Episode 1.6"	Victor Bozhinov	Teodora Vassileva & Georgi Ivanov	May 22, 2011
7	7	"Episode 1.7"	Dimitar Gotchev	Teodora Vassileva & Georgi Ivanov	May 29, 2011
8	8	"Episode 1.8"	Victor Bozhinov	Teodora Vassileva & Georgi Ivanov	June 5, 2011
9	9	"Episode 1.9"	Zoran Petrovski	Teodora Vassileva & Georgi Ivanov	June 12, 2011
10	10	"Episode 1.10"	Victor Bozhinov	Teodora Vassileva & Georgi Ivanov	June 19, 2011
11	11	"Episode 1.11"	Victor Bozhinov	Teodora Vassileva & Georgi Ivanov	June 26, 2011
12	12	"Episode 1.12"	Victor Bozhinov	Teodora Vassileva & Georgi Ivanov	July 3, 2011
