= Undercover (Bulgarian TV series) season 4 =

Undercover
- Season 4
- No. of episodes: 12

Release
- Original network: BNT 1
- Original release: January 19 – April 6, 2014

Season chronology
- ← Previous; Season 3 Next → Season 5

The fourth season of Undercover premiered on BNT 1 on January 19 and ended on April 6, 2014.

== Plot ==
Martin begins his first shift as a regular inspector and started a relationship with Popov's daughter Zornica, Dzharo escaped to Turkey and Ivo started a relationship with Dzharo's daughter Nia. The Hook started a killing spree on Turkish mobsters as a revenge for his wife's and son's murder. Popov deals with private tragedy.

Times are getting harder. Martin is now part of the GDBOP team and has to get used to his new way of life. Jaro allies with a powerful Turkish mobster named Farouk, who wants to build the empire, but on his way stands the Hook, whose family was slaughtered in Barcelona by Farouk's men. The Hook returns to Bulgaria and this time there is nothing to lose. He is thirsty for revenge, but he will not be able to get to the culprits alone. Jaro's daughter, Niya, appears out of nowhere, without anyone knowing anything about her. After a series of successful actions of the CDCOC against the Turkish mafia, Farouk decided to organize an assassination attempt against Popov. He assigned this task to Jaro. His daughter Zornitsa died in an attempt to kill Popov. On the day of her funeral, Jaro appears and asks Popov for forgiveness and offers to surrender, helping to capture Farouk. Overwhelmed by the death of his daughter, Popov kills Jaro. Farouk arranges a meeting with Ivo Andonov with the intention of killing him, but The Hook appears instead, ready to take revenge on his family. He later learns that Farouk's son, Bardem, was responsible for their deaths. The Hook killed him, after which he was arrested. Farouk escapes and still decides to start a business with Ivo Andonov. Popov is convicted of Jaro's murder. He admits to Martin that he introduced a man to Farouk's organization, Erol Metin, the new undercover policeman, and entrusts him with the task of continuing the fight against organized crime.

== Cast ==
=== Main ===
- Ivaylo Zahariev as Martin Hristov
- Zahary Baharov as Ivo Andonov
- Vladimir Penev as Inspector Emil Popov
- Mihail Bilalov as Petar Tudzharov - Dzharo
- Marian Valev as Rosen Gatzov - The Hook

=== Guest ===
- Kiril Efremov as Tihomir Gardev - Tisho the Twin (episodes 1–5, 7, 10, 12)
- Boyko Krastanov as Erol Metin (episodes 6–8, 10-12)
- Yoanna Temelkova as Nia Tudzharova (episodes 1–7, 9, 11-12)

== Episodes ==
No. overall	No. in season	Title	Directed by	Written by	Original release date
37	1	"Episode 4.1"	Dimitar Mitovski	Dimitar Mitovski, Alexander Spasov, Vanya Shtzereva & Marian Valev	January 19, 2014
38	2	"Episode 4.2"	Zoran Petrovski	Dimitar Mitovski, Alexander Spasov, Vanya Shtzereva & Marian Valev	January 26, 2014
39	3	"Episode 4.3"	Zoran Petrovski	Dimitar Mitovski, Alexander Spasov, Borislav Zahariev & Marian Valev	February 2, 2014
40	4	"Episode 4.4"	Martin Makariev	Dimitar Mitovski, Alexander Spasov, Borislav Zahariev & Marian Valev	February 9, 2014
41	5	"Episode 4.5"	Martin Makariev	Dimitar Mitovski, Alexander Spasov, Borislav Zahariev & Marian Valev	February 16, 2014
42	6	"Episode 4.6"	Martin Makariev	Dimitar Mitovski, Alexander Spasov, Vladimir Poleganov & Marian Valev	February 23, 2014
43	7	"Episode 4.7"	Dimitar Gochev	Dimitar Mitovski, Alexander Spasov, Borislav Zahariev & Marian Valev	March 2, 2014
44	8	"Episode 4.8"	Dimitar Gochev	Dimitar Mitovski, Alexander Spasov, Vladimir Poleganov & Marian Valev	March 9, 2014
45	9	"Episode 4.9"	Martin Makariev	Dimitar Mitovski, Alexander Spasov, Borislav Zahariev & Marian Valev	March 16, 2014
46	10	"Episode 4.10"	Victor Bozhinov	Dimitar Mitovski, Alexander Spasov, Vladimir Poleganov & Marian Valev	March 23, 2014
47	11	"Episode 4.11"	Victor Bozhinov	Dimitar Mitovski, Alexander Spasov, Vladimir Poleganov & Marian Valev	March 30, 2014
48	12	"Episode 4.12"	Victor Bozhinov	Dimitar Mitovski, Alexander Spasov, Borislav Zahariev & Marian Valev	April 6, 2014
