= Undercover (Bulgarian TV series) season 3 =

Undercover
- Season 3
- No. of episodes: 12

Release
- Original network: BNT 1
- Original release: November 25, 2012 – February 17, 2013

Season chronology
- ← Previous; Season 2 Next → Season 4

The third season of Undercover premiered on BNT 1 on November 25, 2012, and ended on February 17, 2013.

== Plot ==
Martin, Dzharo, The Hair and the Twins are jailed. Ivo is the new boss. The Hook and Adi are on a vacation where The Hook is on a community service and on a parole. Martin is later released from jail, but finds out that Ivo wants to kill him. Dzharo orders Ivo's murder. Niki the Twin dies from injuries, The Hair gets killed and Dzharo had a dream about Mironov and Elica. Ivo is hit by the biggest loss ever - Dzharo ordered his mother's murder. Neshev is shot during an operation and succumbs to his injuries.

== Cast ==
=== Main ===
- Ivaylo Zahariev as Martin Hristov
- Zahary Baharov as Ivo Andonov
- Vladimir Penev as Inspector Emil Popov
- Mihail Bilalov as Petar Tudzharov - Dzharo
- Alexander Sano as Zdravko Kiselov - The Hair (episodes 1–11)
- Kiril Efremov as Tihomir Gardev - Tisho the Twin
- Ventsislav Yankov as Nikolay Rashev - Niki the Twin (episodes 1–6)
- Tzvetana Maneva as Cveta Andonova, Ivo's mother (episodes 1, 3–4)
- Petar Popyordanov as Momchil Neshev (episodes 1–3)
- Marian Valev as Rosen Gatzov - The Hook

=== Guest ===
- Hristo Mutafchiev as Alexander Mironov (episode 11)

== Episodes ==
No. overall	No. in season	Title	Directed by	Written by	Original release date
25	1	"Episode 3.1"	Victor Bozhinov	Alexander Chobanov, Victor Bozhinov & Alexander Spasov	November 25, 2012
26	2	"Episode 3.2"	Victor Bozhinov	Stanimir Velikov, Alexander Chobanov, Alexander Spasov & Victor Bozhinov	December 2, 2012
27	3	"Episode 3.3"	Victor Bozhinov	Vanya Shtzereva, Vladimir Poleganov, Alexander Chobanov, Alexander Spasov & Victor Bozhinov	December 9, 2012
28	4	"Episode 3.4"	Zoran Petrovski	Vanya Shtzereva, Vladimir Poleganov, Alexander Chobanov, Alexander Spasov & Victor Bozhinov	December 16, 2012
29	5	"Episode 3.5"	Zoran Petrovski	Vanya Shtzereva, Vladimir Poleganov, Alexander Chobanov, Alexander Spasov & Victor Bozhinov	December 23, 2012
30	6	"Episode 3.6"	Victor Bozhinov	Stanimir Velikov, Alexander Chobanov, Alexander Spasov & Victor Bozhinov	December 30, 2012
31	7	"Episode 3.7"	Victor Bozhinov	Vanya Shtzereva, Vladimir Poleganov, Alexander Chobanov, Alexander Spasov & Victor Bozhinov	January 6, 2013
32	8	"Episode 3.8"	Victor Bozhinov	Stanimir Velikov, Alexander Chobanov, Alexander Spasov & Victor Bozhinov	January 13, 2013
33	9	"Episode 3.9"	Victor Bozhinov	Stanimir Velikov, Alexander Chobanov, Alexander Spasov & Victor Bozhinov	January 20, 2013
34	10	"Episode 3.10"	Victor Bozhinov	Vanya Shtzereva, Vladimir Poleganov, Alexander Chobanov & Alexander Spasov	February 3, 2013
35	11	"Episode 3.11"	Victor Bozhinov	Vanya Shtzereva, Vladimir Poleganov, Alexander Chobanov & Alexander Spasov	February 10, 2013
36	12	"Episode 3.12"	Victor Bozhinov	Stanimir Velikov, Alexander Chobanov, Alexander Spasov & Victor Bozhinov	February 17, 2013
