= Undercover (Bulgarian TV series) season 5 =

Undercover
- Season 5
- No. of episodes: 12

Release
- Original network: BNT 1
- Original release: March 20 – June 4, 2016

Season chronology
- ← Previous; Season 4 Next → Season 6

The fifth and final season of Undercover premiered on BNT 1 on March 20 and ended on June 6, 2016.

== Plot ==
Martin was promoted to the chief of the department and met with Popov's Erol Metin. The Hook had been in prison, but with Ivo's help he was released. Popov is in prison and Nia was visited by The Lizard's brother and got raked.

== Cast ==
=== Main ===
- Boyko Krastanov as Erol Metin
- Zahary Baharov as Ivo Andonov
- Ivaylo Zahariev as Martin Hristov
- Vladimir Penev as Inspector Emil Popov
- Yoanna Temelkova as Nia Tudzharova
- Marian Valev as Rosen Gatzov - The Hook

=== Guest ===
- Kiril Efremov as Tihomir Gardev - Tisho the Twin (episodes 1-5, 7-12)

== Episodes ==
No. overall	No. in season	Title	Directed by	Written by	Original release date
49	1	"Episode 5.1"	Dimitar Mitovski	Teodora Markova & Georgi Ivanov	March 20, 2016
50	2	"Episode 5.2"	Dimitar Mitovski	Teodora Markova & Georgi Ivanov	March 27, 2016
51	3	"Episode 5.3"	Zoran Petrovski	Teodora Markova & Georgi Ivanov	April 3, 2016
52	4	"Episode 5.4"	Zoran Petrovski	Teodora Markova & Georgi Ivanov	April 10, 2016
53	5	"Episode 5.5"	Victor Bozhinov	Teodora Markova & Georgi Ivanov	April 17, 2016
54	6	"Episode 5.6"	Victor Bozhinov	Teodora Markova & Georgi Ivanov	April 24, 2016
55	7	"Episode 5.7"	Martin Makariev	Teodora Markova & Georgi Ivanov	May 1, 2016
56	8	"Episode 5.8"	Martin Makariev	Teodora Markova & Georgi Ivanov	May 8, 2016
57	9	"Episode 5.9"	Martin Makariev	Teodora Markova & Georgi Ivanov	May 15, 2016
58	10	"Episode 5.10"	Martin Makariev	Teodora Markova & Georgi Ivanov	May 22, 2016
59	11	"Episode 5.11"	Victor Bozhinov	Teodora Markova & Georgi Ivanov	May 29, 2016
60	12	"Episode 5.12"	Victor Bozhinov	Teodora Markova & Georgi Ivanov	June 4, 2016
