= List of Undercover (Bulgarian TV series) characters =

This is the full list of main and recurring characters on the Bulgarian crime drama television series Undercover.

== Overview ==
Actor	Character	Seasons				
Actor	Character	1	2	3	4	5
Ivaylo Zahariev	Martin Hristov	Main	Main	Main	Main	Main
Irena Milyankova	Silvia Veleva	Main	Main	—N/a	—N/a	—N/a
Zahary Baharov	Ivo Andonov	Main	Main	Main	Main	Main
Vladimir Penev	Emil Popov	Main	Main	Main	Main	Main
Mihail Bilalov	Petar Tudzarov	Main	Main	Main	Main	—N/a
Alexander Sano	Zdravko Kiselov	Main	Main	Main	—N/a	—N/a
Deyan Donkov	Vasil Nikolov	Main	Main	—N/a	—N/a	—N/a
Kiril Efremov	Tihomir Gardev	Main	Main	Main	Recurring	Recurring
Ventsislav Yankov	Nikolay Rashev	Main	Main	Main	—N/a	—N/a
Ivaylo Hristov	Kiril Hristov	Main	Guest	—N/a	—N/a	—N/a
Marian Valev	Rosen Gatzov	Main	Main	Main	Main	Main
Hristo Mutafchiev	Alexander Mironov	Recurring	Main	Guest	—N/a	—N/a
Tzvetana Maneva	Cveta Andonova	Recurring	Main	Main	—N/a	—N/a
Georgi Staykov	Anton Damyanov	—N/a	Main	—N/a	—N/a	—N/a
Petar Popyordanov	Momchil Neshev	—N/a	Main	Main	—N/a	—N/a
Boyko Krastanov	Erol Metin	—N/a	—N/a	—N/a	Recurring	Main
Yoanna Temelkova	Nia Tudzharova	—N/a	—N/a	Stand-in	Recurring	Main

== Main characters ==
=== Martin Hristov ===
Martin Hristov (portrayed by Ivaylo Zahariev) is the lead character on the first four seasons of Undercover and the intermittent lead in the fifth and final season. Martin is a policeman and an insider in Petar Tudzharov's group.

=== Silvia Veleva ===
Silvia Valeva, also known as Sunny, (portrayed by Irena Milyankova) is the mistress of Petar Tudzarov and a love interest of Martin Hristov. She is killed on Tudzharov's orders.

=== Ivo Andonov ===
Ivo Andonov (portrayed by Zahary Baharov) is Petar Tudzharov's right-hand man.. In season 2 he goes rogue from Tudzharov and in season 3 he starts his own criminal group. In season 3 he recruits Krum as his right hand.

=== Emil Popov ===
Emil Popov (portrayed by Vladimir Penev) is an inspector and later a commissioner of MDFOC. He had a wife and a daughter. His wife left him and when his daughter was mistakenly killed. She served him with divorce papers. Popov recruited Martin to work for MDFOC.

=== Petar Tudzharov ===
Petar Tudzharov, also known as "Dzharo", (portrayed by Mihail Bilalov) is a former member of MDFOC and a colleague of Popov, Mironov and Inspector Stolarov. After he left MDFOC, Dzharo becomes an influential businessman and the boss of a criminal group. Tudzharov is killed by Popov.

=== Zdravko Kiselov ===
Zdravko Kiselov, also known as "The Hair", (portrayed by Alexander Sano) is a "brigadier" in Tudzharov's group. The Hair is in love with Tudzharov's waitress Adriana. The Hair is transferred later to Ivo Andonov's group. He is killed by Krum on Ivo's orders.

=== Vasil Nikolov ===
Vasil Nikolov
- Undercover character
- First appearance: "Episode 1.1"
- Last appearance: "Episode 2.4"
- Portrayed by: Deyan Donkov

In-universe information
- Gender: Male
- Occupation: Inspector of MDFOC
- Nationality: Bulgarian

Vasil Nikolov (portrayed by Deyan Donkov) is an MDFOC inspector and a colleague of Popov.

In the first season, Nikolov is shown as one of Emil Popov's men in the police. Later, Martin reveals to Popov that he has a mole in the department, so Popov starts to investigate this. Later, it is revealed Nikolov is the mole and, to avoid detection and arrest, he sets up another inspector— Inspector Todor Todorov. Martin later reveals to Popov that Nikolov is the mole. Popov advises Nikolov that he is going to watch him.

In season two, Popov learns that Nikolov is actually a good cop and an insider in Dzharo's group. He learns from the US Secret Service that Nikolov's corruption is one of his covers in Dzharo's group. Later, in Episode 2.4, when Popov, Nikolov and several other policemen storm a factory processing drugs, Nikolov is shot in the neck by one of the perpetrators. Popov kneels down to help him. Another perpetrator shoots the perpetrator who shot Nikolov. Inspector Todorov arrests the second perpetrator. Despite Popov's efforts to save Nikolov he dies in his arms.

Nikolov's place in the police is taken by Momchil Neshev.

=== Tihomir Gardev ===
Tihomir Gardev
- Undercover character
- First appearance: "Episode 1.1"
- Portrayed by: Kiril Efremov

In-universe information
- Gender: Male
- Family: Borislav Gardev (father); Unknown mother
- Nationality: Bulgarian

Tihomir Gardev (portrayed by Kiril Efremov) better known as "Tisho The Twin" is a brigadier in Dzharo's group. His best friend was Niki The Twin. They were so close that Dzharo said they even go to the toilet together.

In season 1, Tisho is a brigadier in Dzharo's group. He is sentenced to eight years in prison in the season 2 finale. Early in season 3 Dzharo gets him out on bail. He then rejoins Dzharo's group. Dzharo's lawyer Boyana obtains information Tisho is an anonymous witness at Dzharo's trial. That information was planted by Ivo Andonov, Dzharo's former right-hand man. Boyana does not know Dzharo ordered his murder and arranges with Tisho and Niki to kill "The Messenger" and for "The Messenger" kill them. But, when Niki and Tisho see that "The Messenger" is actually Martin, the three of them realise that Dzaro set them up. Soon, Dzharo's real assassins appear and the shooting begins. Martin manages to call The Hook and he saves Martin and Tisho. Later, after Niki's cremation, Tisho saus Niki told him that when he died, he wanted Tisho to snort him. In the season 3 finale, Tisho switches to Ivo's group along with The Hook, but in season 4, Tisho complains to The Hook that Ivo humiliates him by giving him the job as his chauffeur.

In Episode 4.3, Tisho drives Dzharo's daughter Nia to the shore. He tells The Hook he thinks that she is seeing someone else. The Hook does not give a damn. In Episode 4.7, Ivo takes Tisho with him to robbing Dzharo's casino. While they enter the casino a man from security approaches Ivo's back. Tisho kills him before the man gets a chance to shoot. During the run, Tisho meets with Martin and tells him to shoot him, but Martin shoots the door behind him and kills Inspector Manolov by mistake.

During season 5, Tisho is removed from the position of chauffeur and now works like the others in Ivo's group. In Episode 5.8, Ivo orders him to watch the warehouse overnight. Tisho goes there and calls Martin to make a deal with the police because he thinks Ivo wants to kill him. He talks with Martin and tells him about the warehouse and asks to be put in the witness protection program. Martin tells him he will help him in exchange for his testimony. Later, Tisho speaks with The Hook. The Hook tells Tisho Ivo does not want to kill him at all. After that, Tisho calls Martin again and cancels the investigation by pretending he does not know Martin or anything about wearhouse. In Episode 5.9, The Hook becomes worried when he learns Tisho wants to sell his car. He calls and identifies himself as a buyer and Tisho tells him he wants to sell his car. Ivo becomes suspicious about this and gives an order that Tisho be brought to him. His men bring Tisho and Ivo tells him anywhere he goes, he will know where he is. Ivo then lets Tisho go.

In Episode 5.10, the relationship between Tisho and Ivo returns normal like it had never changed.

== Recurring characters ==
- Overview

Actor	Character	Seasons				
Actor	Character	1	2	3	4	5
Milena Nikolova	Adriana Ivanova Simeonova	Recurring	Recurring	Recurring	Recurring	
Iskra Radeva	Yoanna Veleva	Recurring	Recurring			
Georgi Borisov	Chavdar	Recurring				
Stanislav Yanevski	Angel Yakimov	Recurring	Guest			
Plamen Manasiev	Mihail Zarev	Recurring	Recurring	Recurring	Recurring	Recurring
Yosif Shamli	Atanas Kirov	Recurring	Recurring	Recurring	Recurring	Recurring
Lyuben Kanev	Todor Todorov	Recurring	Recurring	Recurring	Recurring	Recurring
Ivo Yonchev	Ivo Manolov	Recurring	Recurring	Recurring	Recurring	
Robert Yanakiev	Krastan Grigorov	Guest	Recurring	Recurring	Recurring	
Snezhana Makaveeva	Zornica Popova	Recurring	Recurring	Recurring	Recurring	
Lilia Maraviglia	Margarita Popova	Recurring	Recurring	Recurring	Recurring	
Koyna Ruseva	Boyana Vasileva	Recurring	Recurring	Recurring		
Krasimir Dokov	Slavov	Recurring	Recurring	Guest		
Lyuben Chatalov	Prosecutor; Bogdan Gitev	Recurring	Recurring	Recurring		
Mihail Milchev	Bogdan Benishev	Recurring		Recurring	Recurring	Recurring
Yoanna Bukovska	Ana Nedelcheva	Recurring	Recurring			
Pavel Chernev	Meto Schtangista	Guest	Recurring	Recurring		
Stoyan Cvetkov	Ventzi Venata	Recurring				
Borislav Zahariev	Cholev	Guest				
Valentin Gaysbeyli	Strahil	Guest				
Hristo Petkov	Roni	Guest				Recurring
Eli Atanasova	Nevena Gatzova	Guest	Recurring	Guest	Guest	
Stefan Shterev	Mazniya		Recurring	Guest		
Adria Simeonova	Asya Panteva		Recurring	Recurring		
Teodora Duhovnikova	Elica Vladeva		Recurring	Recurring		
Stefan Iliev	General Penev		Recurring	Recurring		
Valentin Burski	Officer Georgiev		Recurring			
Nikolay Ishkov	Silvio Baichev		Guest	Guest		

=== Adriana Ivanova Simeonova ===
Adriana Ivanova Simeonova, (seasons 1−4; portrayed by Milena Nikolova), better known as "Adi", is a waitress in Dzaro's cafe. She was a best friend of Dzaro's lover Sunny. From the series' premiere, one of the Dzaro's men, The Hair, tried to convince her to be his girlfriend; she had no interest in him because she was in love with another of Dzaro's men, Ivo.

In season 3 premiere, it is revealed she and one of Dzaro's men, The Hook opened a cafe. During her period there, she becomes Ivo's mistress. She realises he will never love her as his girlfriend and she leaves him. In Episode 3.11, The Hair manages to attract her as his girlfriend and they sleep together. He tells her they have to go somewhere else and buys them plane tickets. He also tells her to wait for him on the highway near the airport. She waits for him, but he does not appear. She calls him on his cellphone, but Martin answers and tells her about The Hair's death. She is devastated. She sits outside the car, near the door, and cries.

In season 4, Adi becomes the madame of a local brothel where prostitutes worked for Ivo and his men. One night, Dzharo turns to her for help with Ivo's murder and tells her The Hair's death also affected him; he wants Ivo to pay. In Episode 4.8, Adi manages to take a sample of Ivo's sperm with the help of one of her prostitutes and plants it in a murdered prostitute. In Episode 4.9, Adi confesses to Martin she planted the evidence and the charges against Ivo are dropped. In Episode 4.10, Adi comes into Dzaro's old local, which is now Ivo's, goes to the toilet and points a gun at Ivo. Ivo peacefully takes the gun and slaps her across the face and tells her to go and that he never wants to see her again. Then, Adi leaves.

It is never mentioned what happened to Adi after she leaves Ivo's gang.

=== Yoanna Veleva ===
Yoanna Veleva (seasons 1−2; portrayed by Iskra Radeva) is Sunny's mother. During season 1, when Sunny wants to break up with Dzaro, Yoanna talks to her and explains that it is better for her to be with Dzaro because he is rich. Sunny visits her later while she is hiding from Dzaro and tells her she loves her. When Yoanna asks her what has happened, Sunny tells her she is hiding from Dzaro and asks her not to tell anyone because it is better that way. When Dzaro learns Sunny is still alive, he goes to Yoanna's and demands that she tell him where Sunny is; she cannot tell him because she does not know, so Dzaro leaves.

After that, Yoanna is neither mentioned nor does she appear again; it is not known what happened to her.

=== Chavdar ===
Chavdar (season 1; portrayed by Georgi Borisov) is a drug dealer who works for Dzaro. He is killed as retribution for Ventzi Venata's murder. Ventzi's brother Dimo orders the killing.

=== Angel Yakimov ===
Angel Yakimov (seasons 1−2; portrayed by Stanislav Yanevski), better known as Ghele, is Dzaro's bodyguard and driver. Ghele also drives Sunny from time to time. Near the season 1 finale, Dzaro finds out about the mole in his organisation and orders all his men's homes to be searched. In the season 2 premiere, after the search, Ghele is scared and wants to leave Dzaro's organisation. He is caught by The Twins because Dzaro wrongly believes he is the mole. Ghele is killed and burned.

=== Mihali Zarev ===
Mihail Zarev (portrayed by Plamen Manassiev) is one of Popov's longtime colleagues in MDFOC. In the season 4 finale, like all his colleagues, he is devastated when Popov tells the judge he killed Dzaro. In season 5, when Martin is suspended from duty, Zarev takes over the squad as his temporary deputy. After Martin's murder, Popov returns to the job and Zarev gives him the position of chief of MDFOC.

=== Atanas Kirov ===
Atanas Kirov (portrayed by Yosif Shamli) is one of Popov's colleagues. In the season 4 finale, like all his colleagues, he is devastated when Popov tells the judge he killed Dzaro. In season 5, when Martin takes his men to raid a factory where Ivo makes drugs, they ambush Ivo and his men. But Roni, one of Ivo's men, takes Kirov as a hostage and holds him as they escape from the factory. Because Martin attempts to shoot Roni, Roni shoots Kirov in the head and Ivo and his men escape.

At Kirov's funeral, it is revealed that Kirov has a wife and a son named Plamen.

=== Todor Todorov ===
Todor Todorov (portrayed by Lyuben Kanev) is one of Popov's colleagues in MDFOC. He is one of the younger inspectors. When his colleague Manolov is killed accidentally by Martin during season 4, Todorov is the first colleague who does not want to speak with Martin again. They later reconcile. During season 5, Martin takes Todorov with him on an off-book mission. Todorov is devastated was when his colleague Kirov is killed.

=== Ivo Manolov ===
Ivo Manolov (seasons 1−4; portrayed by Ivo Yonchev) is the youngest of Popov's colleagues in MDFOC. In season 4, Popov sends his men to ambush Farouk's caisson (ammunition chest) which Ivo and his men went to rob. During Ivo and his men's run, Martin stops Tisho the Twin and tells Martin to shoot him; Martin shoots the door behind him instead. A few seconds later, Manolov crawls outside and dies. Martin is horrified when he realises what he has done.

Manolov is not replaced until Episode 5.2 when Yana Taneva is brought in as a replacement.

=== Krastan Grigorov ===
Krastan Grigorov (seasons 1−4; portrayed by Robert Yanakiev) is Popov's former colleague from MDFOC. In season 3, it is revealed that Grigorov is in fact Ivo Andonov's mole so he is fired. Grigorov, later, returns in season 4 because of some of Ivo's business.

=== Zornica Popova ===
Zornica Popova (seasons 1−4; portrayed by Snezhana Makaveeva) is Emil Popov's daughter. She has a boyfriend named Milen in season 1, but she breaks up with him when she realises he is no good for her. In season 2, Zornica graduates from high school. In one of season 3's episodes, Zornica sees Popov enter a museum followed seconds later by Martin. She follows them. Later, she meets Martin. In another season 3 episode, Zornica goes with her friend, Asya, to a hotel where Ivo's men are located. While they are there, Asya gives her cocaine. Soon, one Asya's clients comes and Zornica is almost raped; she manages to escape. While she is running, she is chased by Ivo's men after he found out from The Hair who she really is. She is saved by Martin. After that, Martin takes her to Popov's flat and they kiss in front of the building. In season 4, Zornica catches her father with his new girlfriend after the divorce from her mother and leaves his flat. Later, she sees Martin before he leaves the city. In Episode 4.10, Zornica goes with her father to the dinner. While they are leaving, one of Farouk's men shoots at Popov but accidentally hits her instead. The bodyguards shoot him and Popov checks her and discovers she is dead. Martin comes seconds later. Following her death, Popov is devastated.

In the next episode, Popov and his ex-wife, Margo, identify her body at the morgue. After Zornica's funeral, Dzaro comes to her grave where Popov remains after the funeral ends. He tells Popov he did not kill her. Popov does not believe him because he saw him leaving the scene after the shooting. He pulls his gun out and shoots and kills Dzaro on the spot.

=== Margarita Popova ===
Margarita Popova (seasons 1−4; portrayed by Lilia Maraviglia), better known as Margo, is Popov's wife. In season 2, she meets her school friend, Anton Damyanov, who is Dzaro's business partner. At the time, she does not know this. They talk and she later goes to his place for dinner. Damyanov rapes her. She returns home, but does not tell Popov what has happened. Later, Popov finds out about the rape incident and presses Damyanovs' wound (after Damyanov was shot by Dzaro minutes before Popov and his men came to Damyanov's place) and tells him who he is. In season 3, Popov's and Margo's marriage becomes rocky and, finally, Margo files for divorce and leaves him. In season 4, Zornica sees her with her new boyfriend and becomes angry with her. After Zornica's murder, Margo and Popov identify her body.

Margo last appears at Popov's trial for Dzaro's murder. She is never mentioned nor appears again.
