= Omnipresent (film) =

2017 film

- Theatrical release poster
- Directed by: Ilian Djevelekov
- Written by: Ilian Djevelekov; Matey Konstantinov
- Produced by: Georgi Dimitrov; Ilian Djevelekov; Matey Konstantinov
- Starring: Velislav Pavlov
- Cinematography: Emil Christov
- Edited by: Alexandra Fuchanska
- Production company: Miramar Film
- Release date: 13 October 2017
- Running time: 120 minutes
- Country: Bulgaria
- Language: Bulgarian

Omnipresent is a 2017 Bulgarian drama film directed by Ilian Djevelekov and written by Djevelekov and Matey Konstantinov. It was selected as the Bulgarian entry for the Best Foreign Language Film at the 91st Academy Awards, but it was not nominated.

== Cast ==
- Velislav Pavlov as Emil
- Teodora Duhovnikova as Anna
- Vesela Babinova as Maria
- Anastassia Liutova as Nia

== Awards ==
- Golden Rose Bulgarian Feature Film Festival (2017) for Best Film and Best Actor
- Critics Guild Award

== See also ==
- List of submissions to the 91st Academy Awards for Best Foreign Language Film
- List of Bulgarian submissions for the Academy Award for Best Foreign Language Film
