= Antibody (disambiguation) =

An antibody is a type of protein used by the immune system.

Antibody or antibodies may also refer to:

- Antibodies (film), a 2005 German film
- Antibody (film), 2002 science fiction film
- "Antibodies", a 2000 short science fiction story by Charles Stross
