= Advantage (film) =

1977 film

- Film poster
- Directed by: Georgi Djulgerov
- Written by: Georgi Djulgerov; Rousy Chanev; Petko Zdravkov-Zdravelin
- Produced by: Trayko Ivanov
- Starring: Rousy Chanev
- Cinematography: Radoslav Spassov
- Edited by: Iliana Mikhova
- Release date: 10 October 1977
- Running time: 138 minutes
- Country: Bulgaria
- Language: Bulgarian

Advantage (Bulgarian: Авантаж, translit. Avantazh) is a 1977 Bulgarian drama film directed by Georgi Djulgerov. It was entered into the 28th Berlin International Film Festival, where Djulgerov won the Silver Bear for Best Director.

== Cast ==
- Rousy Chanev - Petela
- Plamen Donchev - Gerchev
- Maria Statoulova - Roumiana
- Plamena Getova - Gela
- Radosveta Vassileva - Uchitelkata
- Dimitr Ganev - Lyubo
- Veljo Goranov - Palikamara
- Diana Chelebieva - Keranka
- Stefan Popov - Zordan
- Mariana Krumova - Kradlata na znameto
- Valcho Kamarashev - Mazhat na Rumiana
- Evtim Kirilov - Starshinata Dryanski
- Kliment Mihaylov - Sluzhitel ot grazhdanckoto otdelenie
- Iskra Yossiffova - Stazhantka
- Krikor Hugasjan - Chichoto na Rumyana
