= The Colour of the Chameleon =

2012 film

- Theatrical release poster
- Directed by: Emil Hristov
- Written by: Vladislav Todorov
- Starring: Lilia Abadjieva
- Cinematography: Krum Rodriguez
- Release dates: 7 November 2012 (Greece); 5 April 2013 (Bulgaria)
- Running time: 111 minutes
- Country: Bulgaria
- Language: Bulgarian

The Colour of the Chameleon (Bulgarian: Цветът на Хамелеона, translit. Tsvetat Na Chameleona) is a 2012 Bulgarian black comedy thriller film directed by Emil Hristov. The film was selected as the Bulgarian entry for the Best Foreign Language Film at the 86th Academy Awards, but it was not nominated.

== Cast ==
- Lilia Abadjieva as Pravda Cherneva
- Mihail Bilalov as Aleko Polyanski
- Rousy Chanev as Mlyakov
- Deyan Donkov as Kokalov
- Samuel Finzi as Chamov
- Hristo Garbov as The Minister of Interior
- Vassilena Getschkova as Diana Manolova
- Vasilena Getskova as Diana Manolova
- Iordanka Ioveva as Tribadzhakova

== See also ==
- List of submissions to the 86th Academy Awards for Best Foreign Language Film
- List of Bulgarian submissions for the Academy Award for Best Foreign Language Film
