= Tilt (2011 film) =

2011 film

- Film poster
- Directed by: Viktor Chouchkov Jr.
- Written by: Borislav Chouchkov; Viktor Chouchkov Jr.
- Produced by: Borislav Chouchkov
- Starring: Yavor Baharov
- Cinematography: Rali Raltschev
- Music by: Viktor Chouchkov
- Release dates: 28 January 2011 (Santa Barbara Film Festival); 11 February 2011 (Bulgaria)
- Running time: 94 minutes
- Country: Bulgaria
- Languages: Bulgarian; German

Tilt (Bulgarian: Тилт) is a 2011 Bulgarian drama film directed by Viktor Chouchkov. The film was selected as the Bulgarian entry for the Best Foreign Language Film at the 84th Academy Awards, but it did not make the final shortlist.

== Plot ==
The film is set in the early 1990s and tells the story of four friends who are trying to make money with the dream to open their own bar, to be called TILT. A chance meeting between Stash (Yavor Baharoff) and Becky (Radina Kardjilova) brings them to a passionate love affair.

Suddenly, they are caught illegally distributing porn films. Becky's father, a police colonel, takes charge of the case and threatens them with prison. The only way to avoid going to jail is for Stash and Becky to stop seeing each other. They decide to run away to a small German village. Being poor emigrants, they find themselves in a series of funny and absurd situations. Stash is constantly trying to reach Becky, but with no luck. The four friends finally decide to go back to Bulgaria. Meanwhile, Bulgaria has changed, and so has Becky.

== Cast ==
- Yavor Baharov as Stash
- Radina Kardjilova as Becky
- Ovanes Torosian as Gogo
- Alexander Sano as B-Gum
- Ivaylo Dragiev as Angel
- Phillip Avramov as Snake
- Joreta Nikolova as Stash's Mother
- Georgi Staykov as Katev
- Georgi Novakov as Grigorov
- Robert Yanakiev as Sgt. Manolov
- Max Reimann as Bar Owner
- Alexander Hegedush as Pizza
- Thomas Frahm as Shopkeeper
- Sabine Neumann as German Girl
- Britta Fleischhut as German Girl

== Release ==
After it premiered in Bulgaria in February, the film was screened at ten international film festivals, including Santa Barbara, Goteborg, Montreal, Singapore, Raindance (London) and Woodstock. Tilt has been very positively received in the USA where it has been selected for five festivals, including the Seattle International Film Festival.

The film won the Best Editing Award at the Woodstock Film Festival. It has also won Best Main Actor, Best Supporting Actor and the Special Jury Award at Golden Rose Film Festival.

== See also ==
- List of submissions to the 84th Academy Awards for Best Foreign Language Film
- List of Bulgarian submissions for the Academy Award for Best Foreign Language Film
