= Warming Up Yesterday's Lunch =

2002 film

- Film poster
- Directed by: Kostadin Bonev
- Written by: Mile Nedelkoski
- Starring: Svetla Yancheva
- Cinematography: Konstantin Zankov
- Music by: Nikolay Ivanov
- Release date: 19 October 2002
- Running time: 98 minutes
- Countries: Bulgaria, Republic of Macedonia
- Language: Bulgarian

Warming Up Yesterday's Lunch (Bulgarian: Подгряване на вчерашния обед translit. Podgryavane na vcherashniya obed; Macedonian: Подгревање на вчерашниот ручек) is a 2002 Bulgarian — Macedonian drama film directed by Kostadin Bonev. It was entered into the 25th Moscow International Film Festival. It was selected as the Bulgarian entry for the Best Foreign Language Film at the 75th Academy Awards, but it was not nominated.

== Cast ==
- Svetla Yancheva as Older Katerina (as Svetlana Yancheva)
  - Bilyana Kazakova as Young Katerina
- Mariya Mazneva as Katerina
- Snezhina Petrova as Tzena
- Rousy Chanev as Grandpa Vande (as Rusi Chanev)
- Atanass Atanassov as Kiril Vandev
- Galin Stoev as The Director
- Dossio Dossev as Bozhin
  - Nikolay Mutafchiev as young Bozhin
- Stoyan Sardanov as Leshko

== See also ==
- List of submissions to the 75th Academy Awards for Best Foreign Language Film
- List of Bulgarian submissions for the Academy Award for Best International Feature Film
