= List of Undercover (Bulgarian TV series) episodes =

Undercover (Bulgarian: Под Прикритие, transcribed: Pod Prikritie, and pronounced:/pɔt pri'kritiɛ/) was a Bulgarian crime drama television series produced by Bulgarian National Television that premiered on BNT 1 on April 17, 2011.

== Review ==
| Season | Episodes | Originally released | |
| Season | Episodes | First released | Last released |
|---|---|---|---|
| 1 | 12 | April 17, 2011 | July 3, 2011 |
| 2 | 12 | November 20, 2011 | February 5, 2012 |
| 3 | 12 | November 25, 2012 | February 17, 2013 |
| 4 | 12 | January 19, 2014 | April 6, 2014 |
| 5 | 12 | March 20, 2016 | June 4, 2016 |
| 6 | 12 | October 10, 2026 | December 26, 2026 |

== Episodes ==
=== Season 1 (2011) ===
| No. overall | No. in season | Title | Directed by | Written by | Original release date |
|---|---|---|---|---|---|
| 1 | 1 | "Episode 1.1" | Dimitar Mitovski | Teodora Vassileva & Georgi Ivanov | April 17, 2011 |
| 2 | 2 | "Episode 1.2" | Victor Bozhinov | Teodora Vassileva & Georgi Ivanov | April 24, 2011 |
| 3 | 3 | "Episode 1.3" | Dimitar Gotchev | Teodora Vassileva & Georgi Ivanov | May 1, 2011 |
| 4 | 4 | "Episode 1.4" | Dimitar Gotchev | Teodora Vassileva & Georgi Ivanov | May 8, 2011 |
| 5 | 5 | "Episode 1.5" | Victor Bozhinov | Teodora Vassileva & Georgi Ivanov | May 15, 2011 |
| 6 | 6 | "Episode 1.6" | Victor Bozhinov | Teodora Vassileva & Georgi Ivanov | May 22, 2011 |
| 7 | 7 | "Episode 1.7" | Dimitar Gotchev | Teodora Vassileva & Georgi Ivanov | May 29, 2011 |
| 8 | 8 | "Episode 1.8" | Victor Bozhinov | Teodora Vassileva & Georgi Ivanov | June 5, 2011 |
| 9 | 9 | "Episode 1.9" | Zoran Petrovski | Teodora Vassileva & Georgi Ivanov | June 12, 2011 |
| 10 | 10 | "Episode 1.10" | Victor Bozhinov | Teodora Vassileva & Georgi Ivanov | June 19, 2011 |
| 11 | 11 | "Episode 1.11" | Victor Bozhinov | Teodora Vassileva & Georgi Ivanov | June 26, 2011 |
| 12 | 12 | "Episode 1.12" | Victor Bozhinov | Teodora Vassileva & Georgi Ivanov | July 3, 2011 |

=== Season 2 (2011–12) ===
| No. overall | No. in season | Title | Directed by | Written by | Original release date |
|---|---|---|---|---|---|
| 13 | 1 | "Episode 2.1" | Victor Bozhinov | Vanya Nikolova & Yordan Bankov | November 20, 2011 |
| 14 | 2 | "Episode 2.2" | Victor Bozhinov | Vanya Nikolova & Yordan Bankov | November 27, 2011 |
| 15 | 3 | "Episode 2.3" | Dimitar Gotchev | Vanya Nikolova & Yordan Bankov | December 4, 2011 |
| 16 | 4 | "Episode 2.4" | Dimitar Gotchev | Vanya Nikolova & Yordan Bankov | December 11, 2011 |
| 17 | 5 | "Episode 2.5" | Victor Bozhinov | Vanya Nikolova & Yordan Bankov | December 18, 2011 |
| 18 | 6 | "Episode 2.6" | Victor Bozhinov | Vanya Nikolova & Yordan Bankov | December 25, 2011 |
| 19 | 7 | "Episode 2.7" | Dimitar Gotchev | Vanya Nikolova & Yordan Bankov | January 1, 2012 |
| 20 | 8 | "Episode 2.8" | Dimitar Gotchev | Vanya Nikolova & Yordan Bankov | January 8, 2012 |
| 21 | 9 | "Episode 2.9" | Victor Bozhinov | Vanya Nikolova & Yordan Bankov | January 15, 2012 |
| 22 | 10 | "Episode 2.10" | Victor Bozhinov | Vanya Nikolova & Yordan Bankov | January 22, 2012 |
| 23 | 11 | "Episode 2.11" | Victor Bozhinov | Vanya Nikolova & Yordan Bankov | January 29, 2012 |
| 24 | 12 | "Episode 2.12" | Victor Bozhinov | Vanya Nikolova & Yordan Bankov | February 5, 2012 |

=== Season 3 (2012–13) ===
| No. overall | No. in season | Title | Directed by | Written by | Original release date |
|---|---|---|---|---|---|
| 25 | 1 | "Episode 3.1" | Victor Bozhinov | Alexander Chobanov, Victor Bozhinov & Alexander Spasov | November 25, 2012 |
| 26 | 2 | "Episode 3.2" | Victor Bozhinov | Stanimir Velikov, Alexander Chobanov, Alexander Spasov & Victor Bozhinov | December 2, 2012 |
| 27 | 3 | "Episode 3.3" | Victor Bozhinov | Vanya Shtzereva, Vladimir Poleganov, Alexander Chobanov, Alexander Spasov & Victor Bozhinov | December 9, 2012 |
| 28 | 4 | "Episode 3.4" | Zoran Petrovski | Vanya Shtzereva, Vladimir Poleganov, Alexander Chobanov, Alexander Spasov & Victor Bozhinov | December 16, 2012 |
| 29 | 5 | "Episode 3.5" | Zoran Petrovski | Vanya Shtzereva, Vladimir Poleganov, Alexander Chobanov, Alexander Spasov & Victor Bozhinov | December 23, 2012 |
| 30 | 6 | "Episode 3.6" | Victor Bozhinov | Stanimir Velikov, Alexander Chobanov, Alexander Spasov & Victor Bozhinov | December 30, 2012 |
| 31 | 7 | "Episode 3.7" | Victor Bozhinov | Vanya Shtzereva, Vladimir Poleganov, Alexander Chobanov, Alexander Spasov & Victor Bozhinov | January 6, 2013 |
| 32 | 8 | "Episode 3.8" | Victor Bozhinov | Stanimir Velikov, Alexander Chobanov, Alexander Spasov & Victor Bozhinov | January 13, 2013 |
| 33 | 9 | "Episode 3.9" | Victor Bozhinov | Stanimir Velikov, Alexander Chobanov, Alexander Spasov & Victor Bozhinov | January 20, 2013 |
| 34 | 10 | "Episode 3.10" | Victor Bozhinov | Vanya Shtzereva, Vladimir Poleganov, Alexander Chobanov & Alexander Spasov | February 3, 2013 |
| 35 | 11 | "Episode 3.11" | Victor Bozhinov | Vanya Shtzereva, Vladimir Poleganov, Alexander Chobanov & Alexander Spasov | February 10, 2013 |
| 36 | 12 | "Episode 3.12" | Victor Bozhinov | Stanimir Velikov, Alexander Chobanov, Alexander Spasov & Victor Bozhinov | February 17, 2013 |

=== Season 4 (2014) ===
| No. overall | No. in season | Title | Directed by | Written by | Original release date |
|---|---|---|---|---|---|
| 37 | 1 | "Episode 4.1" | Dimitar Mitovski | Dimitar Mitovski, Alexander Spasov, Vanya Shtzereva & Marian Valev | January 19, 2014 |
| 38 | 2 | "Episode 4.2" | Zoran Petrovski | Dimitar Mitovski, Alexander Spasov, Vanya Shtzereva & Marian Valev | January 26, 2014 |
| 39 | 3 | "Episode 4.3" | Zoran Petrovski | Dimitar Mitovski, Alexander Spasov, Borislav Zahariev & Marian Valev | February 2, 2014 |
| 40 | 4 | "Episode 4.4" | Martin Makariev | Dimitar Mitovski, Alexander Spasov, Borislav Zahariev & Marian Valev | February 9, 2014 |
| 41 | 5 | "Episode 4.5" | Martin Makariev | Dimitar Mitovski, Alexander Spasov, Borislav Zahariev & Marian Valev | February 16, 2014 |
| 42 | 6 | "Episode 4.6" | Martin Makariev | Dimitar Mitovski, Alexander Spasov, Vladimir Poleganov & Marian Valev | February 23, 2014 |
| 43 | 7 | "Episode 4.7" | Dimitar Gochev | Dimitar Mitovski, Alexander Spasov, Borislav Zahariev & Marian Valev | March 2, 2014 |
| 44 | 8 | "Episode 4.8" | Dimitar Gochev | Dimitar Mitovski, Alexander Spasov, Vladimir Poleganov & Marian Valev | March 9, 2014 |
| 45 | 9 | "Episode 4.9" | Martin Makariev | Dimitar Mitovski, Alexander Spasov, Borislav Zahariev & Marian Valev | March 16, 2014 |
| 46 | 10 | "Episode 4.10" | Victor Bozhinov | Dimitar Mitovski, Alexander Spasov, Vladimir Poleganov & Marian Valev | March 23, 2014 |
| 47 | 11 | "Episode 4.11" | Victor Bozhinov | Dimitar Mitovski, Alexander Spasov, Vladimir Poleganov & Marian Valev | March 30, 2014 |
| 48 | 12 | "Episode 4.12" | Victor Bozhinov | Dimitar Mitovski, Alexander Spasov, Borislav Zahariev & Marian Valev | April 6, 2014 |

=== Season 5 (2016) ===
| No. overall | No. in season | Title | Directed by | Written by | Original release date |
|---|---|---|---|---|---|
| 49 | 1 | "Episode 5.1" | Dimitar Mitovski | Teodora Markova & Georgi Ivanov | March 20, 2016 |
| 50 | 2 | "Episode 5.2" | Dimitar Mitovski | Teodora Markova & Georgi Ivanov | March 27, 2016 |
| 51 | 3 | "Episode 5.3" | Zoran Petrovski | Teodora Markova & Georgi Ivanov | April 3, 2016 |
| 52 | 4 | "Episode 5.4" | Zoran Petrovski | Teodora Markova & Georgi Ivanov | April 10, 2016 |
| 53 | 5 | "Episode 5.5" | Victor Bozhinov | Teodora Markova & Georgi Ivanov | April 17, 2016 |
| 54 | 6 | "Episode 5.6" | Victor Bozhinov | Teodora Markova & Georgi Ivanov | April 24, 2016 |
| 55 | 7 | "Episode 5.7" | Martin Makariev | Teodora Markova & Georgi Ivanov | May 1, 2016 |
| 56 | 8 | "Episode 5.8" | Martin Makariev | Teodora Markova & Georgi Ivanov | May 8, 2016 |
| 57 | 9 | "Episode 5.9" | Martin Makariev | Teodora Markova & Georgi Ivanov | May 15, 2016 |
| 58 | 10 | "Episode 5.10" | Martin Makariev | Teodora Markova & Georgi Ivanov | May 22, 2016 |
| 59 | 11 | "Episode 5.11" | Victor Bozhinov | Teodora Markova & Georgi Ivanov | May 29, 2016 |
| 60 | 12 | "Episode 5.12" | Victor Bozhinov | Teodora Markova & Georgi Ivanov | June 4, 2016 |

=== Season 6 (2026) ===
Undercover (Bulgarian TV series, season 6)
