= Ilian Djevelekov =

Bulgarian film director and producer

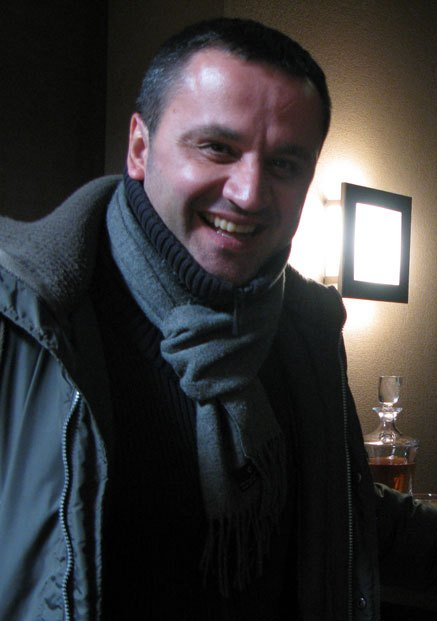
- Ilian Djevelekov, during the filming of LOVE.NET
- Born: 10 May 1966 (age 60); Plovdiv, Bulgaria
- Occupations: Director, Producer
- Writing career
- Period: 1992 – present

Ilian Djevelekov (Bulgarian: Илиян Джевелеков, IPA: [ilijan d͡ʒɛvɛlɛkof]; born 10 May 1966) is a Bulgarian film director and producer.

== Career ==
Djevelekov studied psychology at Sofia University, and graduated in film and television directing from the National Academy for Theatre and Film Arts in Sofia. In 1993, his student film I Want To Be Free won the Best Short Film award at the Golden Rose Film Festival in Varna. From 1994 to 2000, he worked as producer and director at Ku-Ku Film Company. In 2001, he founded the production company Miramar Film, together with Matey Konstantinov and Georgi Dimitrov, which now ranks among Bulgaria's top production companies for feature films, documentaries and TV commercials. Djevelekov has directed and produced tens of TV commercials and documentaries.

=== Producer ===
The feature film Zift by director Javor Gardev was Ilian Djevelekov's first film as producer of full-length features. The film received Silver St. George award for best director at the Moscow International Film Festival 2008. It was acclaimed at festivals such as Toronto IFF, Melbourne, Mar del Plata, Istanbul, etc. and was sold in Europe and in the US to IFC Films. In Bulgaria it was the most successful domestic release for the past 20 years.

=== Director ===
Ilian's first feature film as director - LOVE.NET was released in Bulgarian theaters in 2011 and became number one box office hit for the year. Ilian is also producer and co-writer of the film. LOVE.NET ranked in the top 10 domestic hits of all time and was selected in competition at Bratislava International Film Festival and the Bahamas International Film Festival among others. In 2011 Ilian received the Best Director award from the Bulgarian Film Academy. Currently Ilian is developing a new film project.

== Filmography ==
=== LOVE.NET (2011) ===
Director, Producer, Screenwriter

2010 - Moscow International Film Festival

- Nominated - Official Out of Competition Section

2011 - Bulgarian Feature Film Festival Golden Rose

- Won - Best Screenplay – Nelly Dimitrova, Matey Konstantinov, Ilian Djevelekov
- Won - Best Actress – Lilia Maraviglia
- Won - Debut Award – Ilian Djevelekov

2011 - Bratislava International Film Festival

- Nominated - Main Competition

2011 - Kolkata International Film Festival

- Nominated - International cinema

2011 - Bahamas International Film Festival

- Nominated - Main competition

2011 - Bulgarian Film Academy Awards

- Won - Best Director – Ilian Djevelekov
- Won - Best Director of Photography – Emil Christov (b.a.c.)
- Won - Best Production Designer – Georgi Dimitrov
- Won - Best Editor – Alexandra Fuchanska
- Nominated - Best Picture
- Nominated - Best Actress – Lilia Maraviglia
- Nominated - Best Screenplay – Nelly Dimitrova, Matey Konstantinov, Ilian Djevelekov
- Nominated - Best Original Score – Petko Manchev
- Nominated - Best Costume Designer – Kristina Tomova, Sylvia Vladimirova

2012 - Romania International Film Festival

- Nominated - Main competition

2012 - Cyprus International Film Festival

- Nominated - Main competition

=== Cuba is Music (2009) ===
Director, Producer, Screenwriter

2009 - Sofia International Film Festival

- Nominated - Documentary Program Out of Competition

2009 - Temecula Valley International Film and Music Festival, California

- Nominated – Documentary Program

2009 - Bulgarian Documentary and Animation Film Festival “Golden Rhyton”, Plovdiv

- Nominated – Competition

2009 - International TV Festival “Golden Chest”, Plovdiv

- Nominated – Competition

2009 - EastSilver Film Market, Jihlava

- Nominated – Silver Eye Award

2009 - World Film Festival of Bangkok

- Nominated – Music and Dance Section

2010 - Romanian International Film Festival

- Nominated – CineBlackSea Documentary Competition

2010 - CinePecs International Film Festival

- Nominated – Focus Section

2011 - International Festival of Films about Music KAMERaTON, Poland

- Nominated – Main Competition

=== Zift (2008) ===
Producer

2008 - Moscow International Film Festival

- Won - "Silver St. George" for Best Director in Main Competition - Javor Gardev
- Won - The prize of the Russian Film Clubs Federation for Best Film in Main Competition

2008 - Toronto International Film Festival

- Nominated - Discovery Competition

2008 - Bulgarian Feature Film Festival Golden Rose

- Won - Best Film Award "Golden rose"
- Won - Best Leading Actor Award - Mihail Mutafov
- Won - Best Director of Photography Award - Emil Christov (b.a.c.)
- Won - Best Editor - Kevork Aslanyan
- Won - Special Prize of the Film Critics Association
- Won - Best Producers Special Prize bestowed by New Boyana Film

2009 - Sofia International Film Festival

- Won - Special Award of the International Jury
- Won - Kodak Award for Best Bulgarian Feature Film

2009 - Vilnius International Film Festival “Cinema Spring”

- Won - Best Director Award (Special Mention) - Javor Gardev
