= Rousy Chanev =

Bulgarian actor (born 1945)

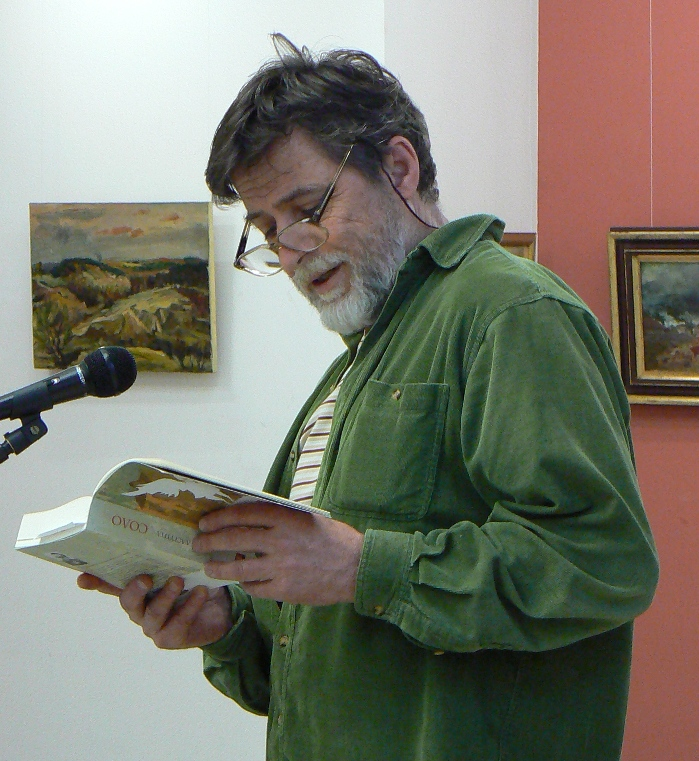
- Born: 18 September 1945 (age 80); Burgas, Bulgaria
- Occupation: Actor
- Years active: 1967-present

Rousy Chanev (Bulgarian: Руси Чанев) (born 18 September 1945) is a Bulgarian actor. He has appeared in 30 films since 1966. He starred in the 1977 film Advantage, which was entered into the 28th Berlin International Film Festival where it won the Silver Bear for Best Director.

== Selected filmography ==
- Torrid Noon (1965)
- Advantage (1977)
- Warming Up Yesterday's Lunch (2002)
- The Colour of the Chameleon (2012)
