= Ties (TV series) =

- Връзки
- Genre: Comedy
- Written by: Vanya Nikolova; Yordan Bankov; Neli Dimitrova
- Starring: Mihail Bilalov; Lilia Maraviglia; Aneta Sotirova; Valeri Yordanov; Yana Marinova; Nikolai Ishkov; Angela Nedyalkova
- Country of origin: Bulgaria
- Original language: Bulgarian
- No. of seasons: 2
- No. of episodes: 20

Production
- Producer: Emo Vision
- Running time: 45 minutes (no ads)

Original release
- Network: bTV (Season 1); Fox Life (Season 2)
- Release: June 3, 2015 – June 6, 2016

Ties is a Bulgarian comedy series emanating for bTV, produced by Emo Vision. It starred Mihail Bilalov, Lilia Maravilya, Lyuben Chatalov, Aneta Sotirova, Valeri Yordanov, Yana Marinova, Nikolai Ishkov, Angela Nedyalkova, Lori Kamburova, and Alex Alexiev. In January, 2016 FOX Networks Group acquired the rights to broadcast the first season of "Ties" for 8 territories in which it operates. Fox Life broadcasting episodes of the second season of the series. The premiere was on April 4, 2016 at 19:30 pm. The show broadcasting simultaneously in Bulgaria, Serbia, Croatia, Slovenia, Macedonia, Bosnia and Herzegovina, Montenegro, Kosovo and Albania.

== Series overview ==
| Seasons | Timeslot | TV Season | Episodes | Premiere | Final | Duration |
|---|---|---|---|---|---|---|
| 1 | Wednesday-Friday, 9:30 PM | 2015 (Summer) | 10 | June 3, 2015 | June 25, 2015 | 45 minutes (no ads) |
| 2 | Monday, 10 PM | 2016 (Spring) | 10 | April 4, 2016 | June 6, 2016 | 45 minutes (no ads) |

== Characters ==
- Mihail Bilalov – Tony, marriage counselor, husband of Mika
- Lilia Maravilya – Mika, architect, wife of Tony
- Aneta Sotirova – Felina, a former actress, mother of Tony
- Valeri Yordanov – Alexander Panov, underground boss, lover Mika and ex-boyfriend of Yasmina
- Yana Marinova – Yasmina, sexologist, mistress of Tony
- Nikolai Ishkov – No. 1, former husband of Mika, father of Leah and Bogdan
- Angela Nedyalkova – Dara, daughter of Tony and Mika
- Lorina Kamburova – Leah, lingerie model, daughter of Mika and No. 1
- Alex Alexiev – Bogdan, journalist, son of Mika, the twin brother of Leah
- Irini Zhambonas – Irina, girlfriend Number 1, Mika's friend
- Ilyana Lazarova – Mika's assistant
