= Tarika (film) =

- Theatrical release poster
- Directed by: Milko Lazarov
- Written by: Ekaterina Churilova; Milko Lazarov; Simeon Ventsislavov
- Produced by: Veselka Kiryakova
- Starring: Vesela Valcheva; Zahari Baharov
- Cinematography: Kaloyan Bozhilov
- Edited by: Veselka Kiryakova
- Music by: Penka Kouneva
- Production companies: Red Carpet; 42film Amour Fou Luxembourg; ZDF/Arte
- Release dates: October 10, 2024 (BFI); February 21, 2025 (Bulgaria)
- Running time: 86 minutes
- Countries: Bulgaria; Germany; Luxembourg
- Language: Bulgarian
- Box office: $27,814

Tarika (Bulgarian: Стадото, romanized: Stadoto, lit. 'The Herd'), also known as The Herd, is a 2024 drama film co-written and directed by Milko Lazarov. It stars Vesela Valcheva and Zahari Baharov.

The film had its world premiere at the Love section of the 68th BFI London Film Festival on October 10, 2024. It was selected as the Bulgarian entry for the Best International Feature Film at the 98th Academy Awards, but it was not nominated.

== Synopsis ==
Tarika has begun to develop butterfly wings, a bone disease inherited from her mother. Ali supports his daughter, willing to do everything to protect her from the intolerance of the town where they live.

== Cast ==
- Vesela Valcheva as Tarika
- Zahari Baharov as Ali
- Ivan Savov as Mayor
- Marko Nokov as Nikola
- Ivan Barnev as Petko
- Mimoza Bazova as Hrisula
- Valeria Varbanova as Maria
- Christos Stergioglou as Thanasis
- Nina Goranovski as Irina
- Julian Vergov as Doctor
- Vesko Petkov as Shepherd
- Petar Sardzhev as Aladin
- Ina Kichkova as Elena
- Maria Lazarova as Fortune teller
- Konstantin Lazarov as Man at the fair

== Release ==
Tarika had its world premiere on October 10, 2024, at the 68th BFI London Film Festival, then screened on November 13, 2024, at the 38th Kinomania Film Festival.

The film was released commercially on February 21, 2025, in Bulgarian theaters.

== Accolades ==
Year	Award / Festival	Category	Recipient	Result	Ref.
2024	30th Kolkata International Film Festival	Best Film - International Competition	Tarika	Won	

== See also ==
- List of submissions to the 98th Academy Awards for Best International Feature Film
- List of Bulgarian submissions for the Academy Award for Best International Feature Film
