= Teodora Duhovnikova =

Bulgarian actress (born 1977)

- Born: Teodora Ivanova; 14 December 1977 (age 47); Sofia, Bulgaria
- Occupation: Actress
- Years active: 2002–present
- Spouse: Stefan Duhovnikov (m. 2009)
- Children: 2

Teodora Duhovnikova (Bulgarian: Теодора Духовникова; née Ivanova; born 14 December 1977) is a Bulgarian actress. She is best known for her roles in the BNT series Undercover (2011–2013), Boyka: Undisputed (2016) and Omnipresent (2017).

== Early life and education ==
Duhovnikova was born on 14 December 1977 in Sofia, Bulgaria. She graduated from the National School for Ancient Languages and Cultures, and later from the National Academy for Theatre and Film Arts.

== Selected filmography ==
=== Film ===
Year	Title	Role	Notes
2002	Antibody	Trechak	
2003	Cult of Fury	Rita	
2007	Trade Routes	Lina Lindy Hammilton	
2008	The Shepherd	Anna-Lucia Ashley	
2008	Forecast	Margarita	
2011	Conan the Barbarian	Nun	
2015	Corpse Collector	Katya	
2016	Boyka: Undisputed	Alma	
2017	Omnipresent	Anna	
2017	Bubblegum	Bilyana	
2017	Day of the Dead: Bloodline	Wendy	

=== Television ===
Year	Title	Role	Notes
2011–2013	Undercover	Elitsa Vladeva	14 episodes
2013	The Tree of Life	Bojura Djevezova-Vulcheva	Main role
2014	Alexander the Great	Olympias	2 episodes
2019	Devil's Throat	Mia Yazova	Main role

=== Voice ===
Year	Title	Role	Notes
2016	Blind Vaysha	Narrator	Bulgarian dub
