= Sevda Shishmanova =

Bulgarian producer

Sevda Shishmanova (born June 2, 1962, in Razgrad) is a Bulgarian producer, director and journalist of Bulgarian Turkish origin.

== Education ==
Shishmanova studied Bulgarian Philology at Sofia University and documentary film directing at Krastyo Sarafov National Academy for Theatre and Film Arts.

== Career ==
Since 1992, she has worked on local and international television and radio assignments for Bulgarian National Television and Economedia Press Group including in Afghanistan, Pakistan, northern Iraq, Macedonia and Turkey.

She is the producer of the award-winning Bulgarian series Undercover for which she was nominated as best producer and the author of more than fifteen documentaries.

In 1996, along with cameraman Hirsto Obreshkov, Shishmanova was arrested in Diyarbakir and interrogated for two days.

From 2010 until 2017 she was program director of BNT 1.

== Recognition ==
- Member of Management Board, Programing director and Head of Film Production of Bulgarian National Television (2006–2010).
- "Johns Hopkins University SAIS – Novartis International Journalism Award" 2001 for the documentary Unfinished War: Macedonia's Unresolved 'Albanian Issue'.
- Unfinished War was nominated in top 10 for international journalism achievements.
- Director of Programme BNT1 and Head of Film Production (2010–2017)
- Member of the National Counsel of Cinema (2006–2008)
- Member of the International jury of Sofia Film Festival 2007
- Member of the International jury of Filmini / short movie film festival 2008
- Member of the Jury of National Film Festival "Golden Rose" 2010
- Member of the Jury of International Students Film Festival "Early Bird" 2016
- Member of the International Jury of Master of Art Film Festival (2016–2017)
- Member of International Jury of Sofia Independent Film Festival

== Filmography ==
- Undercover (2011–2016 5 seasons) as producer
- Fourth Estate (2013) as producer
- The Umbrella (2022) as director
- Remains of Life (2022) as director
