= Operation Shmenti Capelli =

2011 film

- Directed by: Ivan Mitov
- Written by: Vladislav Dimitrov
- Produced by: Vladislav Dimitrov
- Starring: Hari Anichkin
- Cinematography: Kiril Valchanov
- Release date: 4 October 2011
- Country: Bulgaria
- Language: Bulgarian

Operation Shmenti Capelli (Bulgarian: Операция „Шменти капели“) is a 2011 Bulgarian drama film directed by Ivan Mitov.

== Cast ==
- Hari Anichkin as General Gospodinov
- Zahari Baharov as Tatko
- Kiril Efremov as Botora
- Vladislav Karamfilov as Karaduro
- Malin Krastev as Nadejdev
- Rosica Litova as Kalinka
- Plamen Peev as Totsev
- Georgi Penkov as Psychiatrist
- Hristo Shopov as Lyubev
- Stefan Shterev as Gipsa
- Konstantin Slavov as Shopa
- Georgi Stoev as Psychiatrist
- Kitodar Todorov as Verev
- Vladimir Vladimirov as Litseto X
