= Lilia Maraviglia =

Bulgarian actress (born 1969)

Lilia Maraviglia (Bulgarian: Лилия Маравиля; born 18 January 1969, in Varna) is a Bulgarian actress. She is married to Italian banker Luca Maraviglia (2001–present) and they have a daughter named Paola.

== Filmography ==
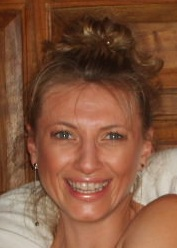

Film

Year	Title	Role	Notes
1991	Native Games	The mute girl	
1994	Forests, woods, light		
2002	Camera-Curtain	The actress	
2005	Icon	Metropol Hotel Reporter #2	
2006	The way to the top		
2011	Love.net	Mila	

TV

Year	Title	Role	Notes
2006	Magna Aura	Elena	13 episodes
2011	Pod Prikritie	Margarita	Recurring cast
2015	Ties	Mika	10 episodes
