= Love.net =

2011 film

- Official poster in Bulgaria
- Directed by: Ilian Djevelekov
- Written by: Nelly Dimitrova; Matey Konstantinov; Ilian Djevelekov
- Produced by: Miramar Film; Matey Konstantinov; Ilian Djevelekov; Georgi Dimitrov
- Starring: Hristo Shopov
- Cinematography: Emil Hristov
- Edited by: Alexandra Fuchanska
- Music by: Petko Manchev
- Distributed by: Miramar Film
- Release date: 1 April 2011
- Running time: 109 minutes
- Country: Bulgaria
- Languages: Bulgarian; English

Love.net is a 2011 Bulgarian drama film directed by Ilian Djevelekov. The film features top Bulgarian actors Hristo Shopov, Vladimir Penev, Zahari Baharov, Lilia Maraviglia, Koyna Ruseva, Diana Dobreva, Dilyana Popova. It is also the first movie appearance of British rock and roll and blues vocalist John Lawton known for his work with Lucifer's Friend, Uriah Heep and the Les Humphries Singers. Love.net is a film about "love at first virtual sight" directed by Ilian Djevelekov. It is produced by the Bulgarian company Miramar Film, and is written by Ilian Djevelekov, Matey Konstantinov, and Nelly Dimitrova. Djevelekov is known for directing one of the most successful recent Bulgarian movies "Zift".

The film won three awards at the 2011 Bulgarian National Film Festival, including Best First Feature Film for Ilian Djevelekov.

== Cast ==
- Hristo Shopov as Filip Bogatev
- Zachary Baharov as Andrey Bogatev
- Lilia Maraviglia as Mila Bogateva
- Koyna Ruseva as Emilia
- Diana Dobreva as Joana
- Dilyana Popova as Niki
- John Lawton as John Johnson
- Lora Cheshmedjieva as Devora
- Yordanka Kuzmanova as Dora
- Vladimir Penev as The Chief
- Teo Avramov as Toni Bogatev

== Casting ==
Ilian Djevelekov came up with the idea for Love.net in 2004. Before developing the script, the team contacted the owners of Elmaz, a Bulgarian dating site which at the time was popular, who agreed to cooperate with them for the unique movie project. In December 2007 and January 2008 every member of Elmaz had the opportunity to submit to the screenwriters of Love.net their most interesting online dating stories; a total of 7,346 stories were submitted, with the directing team being able to draw upon them for their film.

== Awards ==
2010 - Moscow International Film Festival

- Nominated - Official Out of Competition Section

2011 - Bulgarian Feature Film Festival Golden Rose

- Won - Best Screenplay – Nelly Dimitrova, Matey Konstantinov, Ilian Djevelekov
- Won - Best Actress – Lilia Maraviglia
- Won - Debut Award – Ilian Djevelekov

2011 - Bratislava International Film Festival

- Nominated - Main Competition

2011 - Kolkata International Film Festival

- Nominated - International cinema

2011 - Bahamas International Film Festival

- Nominated - Main competition

2011 - Bulgarian Film Academy Awards

- Won - Best Director – Ilian Djevelekov
- Won - Best Director of Photography – Emil Christov (b.a.c.)
- Won - Best Production Designer – Georgi Dimitrov
- Won - Best Editor – Alexandra Fuchanska
- Nominated - Best Picture
- Nominated - Best Actress – Lilia Maraviglia
- Nominated - Best Screenplay – Nelly Dimitrova, Matey Konstantinov, Ilian Djevelekov
- Nominated - Best Original Score – Petko Manchev
- Nominated - Best Costume Designer – Kristina Tomova, Sylvia Vladimirova

2012 - Romania International Film Festival

- Nominated - Main competition

2012 - Cyprus International Film Festival

- Nominated - Main competition
