= Javor Gardev =

Bulgarian film and stage director

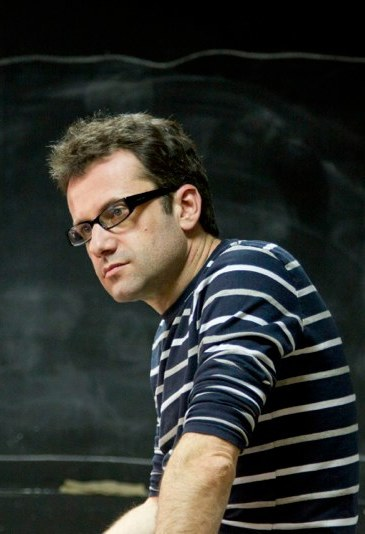
- Born: Javor Gardev Stefanov; February 23, 1972 (age 54); Sofia, Bulgaria
- Occupations: Film and stage director

Javor Gardev (Bulgarian: Явор Гърдев; born February 23, 1972) is a Bulgarian stage and film director, known for his 2008 feature debut film Zift.

== Early life and education ==
Javor Gardev holds a Master’s degree in Philosophy MPhil from Sofia University, and a Master’s degree in Directing (MFA) from the National Academy of Theatre and Film Arts in Sofia. A recipient of the prestigious Fulbright Award, Gardev specialized at Northwestern University’s School of Communication in the United States.

Javor Gardev earned his PhD in Art Studies from the New Bulgarian University, where he successfully defended an interdisciplinary dissertation bridging philosophy, social sciences and theater studies. He currently serves as a director at the National Theatre of Bulgaria and has staged over 50 theatrical productions in Bulgaria and internationally.

== Career ==
Gardev has directed radio-drama and authored performance art and video artworks.

Since 2022 he works as resident stage director at The National Theatre of Bulgaria in Sofia.

He is a member of the European Film Academy since 2009. In 2011 he founded Compania Ecstatica.

=== Theatre ===
Among his most famous stage productions are: The Pillowman (2004), Caligula (2008), A Behanding in Spokane (2011), and Almost an Evening (2013).

=== Film ===
In 2008 Gardev directed his first feature film, Zift. The film was produced by Miramar Film (Bulgaria), with the Bulgarian National Film Center and the Bulgarian National Television as co-producers. Gardev is slated to direct his second film, entitled Theseus, which will be a tale of the Greek mythological hero Theseus.

== Awards ==
Gardev won the Silver St. George for Best Director in Main Competition at the 30th Moscow International Film Festival. Zift was part of the selections of fifty-four international film festivals, including Toronto International Film Festival, 2008 (Official Selection, Discovery). It was Bulgaria's official entry for foreign-language Oscar and part of the Official Selection for the European Film Academy Awards, 2008. Until 2009 when its domestic record was broken, it was the highest grossing Bulgarian feature film since the prior two decades.
