= Antibody (film) =

2002 film directed by Christian McIntire

- Directed by: Christian McIntire
- Written by: Michael Baldwin
- Starring: Lance Henriksen; Robin Givens; Yulian Vergov
- Edited by: Christian McIntire
- Release date: February 8, 2003
- Running time: 91 minutes
- Country: United States
- Language: English

Antibody is a 2002 science fiction thriller film directed and edited by Christian McIntire that debuted as a Sci Fi Pictures TV-movie on the Sci Fi Channel on February 8, 2003.

== Premise ==
A scientist (Lance Henriksen) leads a team in an experimental miniaturized craft injected into the bloodstream of a dying terrorist (Yulian Vergov) whose body conceals a computer chip that will trigger a nuclear explosion in the U.S. Capitol Building in less than 24 hours.

== Cast ==
- Lance Henriksen as Dr. Richard Gaines
- Robin Givens as Rachel Saverini
- William Zabka as Emmerich
- Gaston Pauls as Pacio
- Yulian Vergov as Anthony Moran
- Teodora Duhovnikova as Trechak
- Stella Ivanova as Amanda
- Kathleen Randazzo as Nancy Pearson
- Velizar Binev as Dr. Bickell
- Yulian Vergov as Moran
- Christian McIntire as Agent Roth

== See also ==
- List of films featuring miniature people
