= Emil Hristov =

Bulgarian cinematographer (born 1956)

- Born: 13 August 1956 (age 69); Sofia, Bulgaria
- Occupation: Cinematographer
- Years active: 1983-present

Emil Hristov (born 13 August 1956) is a Bulgarian cinematographer. He contributed to more than fifty films since 1983 including Love.net. Hristov also directed The Colour of the Chameleon.
