= Zift =

- Bulgarian: Дзифт
- Directed by: Javor Gardev
- Written by: Vladislav Todorov
- Based on: Zift by Vladislav Todorov
- Produced by: Georgi Dimitrov; Ilian Dzhevelekov; Matey Konstantinov; Stefan Goranov
- Starring: Zachary Baharov; Tanya Ilieva; Vladimir Penev; Mihail Mutafov; Đoko Rosić
- Cinematography: Emil Hristow
- Edited by: Kevork Aslanyan
- Music by: Kalin Nikolov
- Production companies: Bulgarian National Film Center; Bulgarian National Television; Miramar Film
- Distributed by: Alexandra Films; Miramar Film
- Release dates: 27 June 2008 (Moscow); 25 September 2008 (Bulgaria)
- Running time: 92 minutes
- Country: Bulgaria
- Language: Bulgarian
- Budget: 1,200,000 levs (€600,000)

Zift (Bulgarian: Дзифт, Dzift) is a 2008 black-and-white Bulgarian drama film that combines neo-noir and black comedy with socialist retro motifs; it is based on Vladislav Todorov's 2006 same-named novel and he also wrote the script. Zift was directed by Javor Gardev and premiered on 27 June 2008 at the 30th Moscow International Film Festival, where it won a Silver George for Best Director and the Best Film Prize of the Russian Film Clubs Federation.

The film stars Zachary Baharov as Moth, the main character who organizes a robbery out of love and money and is imprisoned before the 9 September coup d'état for a murder he did not commit. Moth is released from jail in the 1960s to meet the new and unfamiliar reality of socialist Sofia.

Zift's name is derived from the Arabic loanword zift or dzift, meaning "asphalt", "bitumen" or "black pitch", once a popular chewing substance among the gangs in Sofia's asphalt jungle; the word is also said to be urban slang for shit.

== Plot ==
Zift's plot unfolds non-linearly: although the main story after Moth's release from prison is told chronologically, the events leading to his imprisonment are revealed by means of numerous relatively long and not necessarily chronological flashbacks. The story is presented chronologically here.

Moth is an ordinary guy from Sofia, the capital of Bulgaria. At school, he falls in love with the beautiful Ada (Tanya Ilieva), later nicknamed "Mantis". Out of a desire for money, he agrees to work for a shady neighbour known as Slug (Vladimir Penev). The two plot the theft of a black diamond from the white émigré jeweller Vlad the Bijou's house. The robbery ends in failure as Moth is wounded by The Bijou and captured by the police; Slug manages to escape and is never charged. There is no trace of the diamond, and as Vlad is killed by Slug during the robbery, the police never get to know of its existence.

In the Sofia prison, Moth, besides working out to patriotic Soviet music, also befriends his older roommate Van Wurst the Eye (Mihail Mutafov), so nicknamed because he has been wearing an ocular prosthesis after losing one of his eyes during a robbery in Barcelona. Besides being an avid boxer and arm wrestler, Van Wurst also has his philosophical views on life, such as a theory about the destructive power of women, which he shares with Moth. Shortly before being released, Van Wurst hangs himself, claiming "there is no hope outside". While in prison, Moth is informed by Ada that his son Leonid was born and died of lockjaw while still very young.

As Moth is released from prison afterwards, he picks up his civil clothes and his year-old ball of chewing bitumen from the cloakroom and does not miss the chance to swear at an obnoxious guard, who headbutts him to unconsciousness. Outside, Moth is picked by a warrant officer and a younger soldier who drive him in a Chaika to the Baths. In the damp basement of the Baths, he is interrogated and tortured by Slug, now a locally influential member of the communist nomenklatura, who believes Moth knows the location of the black diamond. Moth denies and even doubts the diamond ever existed; he later manages to escape, but not before he consumes iridium-poisoned wine offered to him by Slug.

Wandering drunk and intoxicated around Sofia and seeking his old girlfriend Ada, Moth gets to witness the new socialist reality he had only heard about on the prison radio: the look of the city has changed with The Largo and the Georgi Dimitrov Mausoleum, but the nature of the people has remained essentially the same. The protagonist meets a variety of bizarre characters, such as drug-doing medics, weird patients and local drunks. He ends up in the Saint Nicholas Church, where he meets the priest who had baptized him (Đoko Rosić); the priest points him to Ada's current whereabouts as a performer in a nightclub under the stage name Gilda (a reference to Gilda, as Ada also performs a Bulgarian-language version of Put the Blame on Mame).

Moth finds Ada, who is now living with Slug, and has sex with her. He later reveals to Ada that he is aware of the diamond's location: in Vlad the Bijou's coffin. The two go to the graveyard, where Moth first insists to visit the grave of his son. However, he realizes that it is another Leonid's grave (his mother had been buried in the same grave very recently) and that he never actually had a son. At the same time he notices Slug standing behind him with Ada, who had apparently betrayed him. The three head to The Bijou's grave; while digging, Moth kills Slug with his pickaxe, but is fatally wounded and stunned by Ada a moment later.

Moth wakes up in the gravediggers' shed. Realizing his impending death, he asks for his bitumen in order not to die with foul breath. Tearing the bitumen apart, Moth reveals the black diamond had been stashed within it for all those years. He swallows the diamond and dies.

== Cast and characters ==
- Zachary Baharov as Lev Kaludov Zhelyazkov, better known as Moth (Молеца, Moletsa) or Leo
- Tanya Ilieva as Ada or Mantis (Богомолката, Bogomolkata), Moth's femme fatale pre-prison girlfriend
- Vladimir Penev as Slug (Плужека, Pluzheka), Moth's accomplice in the failed diamond theft and Mantis' later lover
- Mihail Mutafov as Van Wurst the Eye (Ванвурст Окото, Vanvurst Okoto), Moth's prison roommate
- Đoko Rosić as The Priest
- Jordan Mutafov as Vlad the Bijou

== Awards ==
2008 – Moscow International Film Festival

- Won – “Silver St. George” for Best Director in Main Competition – Javor Gardev
- Won – The prize of the Russian Film Clubs Federation for *Best Film in Main Competition

2008 – Toronto International Film Festival

- Nominated – Discovery Competition

2008 – Bulgarian Feature Film Festival Golden Rose

- Won – Best Film Award “Golden rose”
- Won – Best Leading Actor Award – Mihail Mutafov
- Won – Best Director of Photography Award – Emil Christov (b.a.c.)
- Won – Best Editor – Kevork Aslanyan
- Won – Special Prize of the Film Critics Association
- Won – Best Producers Special Prize bestowed by New Boyana Film

2009 – Sofia International Film Festival

- Won – Special Award of the International Jury
- Won – Kodak Award for Best Bulgarian Feature Film

2009 – Vilnius International Film Festival "Cinema Spring"

- Won – Best Director Award (Special Mention) – Javor Gardev

== Broadcasts ==
In May 2009, the film's producers announced HBO had bought the broadcast rights for the film. The film was the first Bulgarian film to be broadcast on HBO.

== See also ==
- List of Bulgarian submissions for the Academy Award for Best Foreign Language Film
- List of submissions to the 81st Academy Awards for Best Foreign Language Film
