= Georgi Staykov =

Bulgarian actor (born 1964)

- Георги Стайков
- Born: 10 August 1964 (age 61); Veliko Tarnovo, Bulgaria
- Occupation: Actor
- Years active: 1985–present

Georgi Nikolov Staykov (Bulgarian: Георги Николов Стайков, born 10 August 1964 in Veliko Tarnovo, Bulgaria) is a Bulgarian actor. He graduated in acting from the National Academy for Theatre and Film Arts, Sofia.

== Professional career ==
His debut in cinema was a minor role in Boris I in 1985. in 1988, Staykov became famous in Bulgaria with "Vchera" (Bulgarian: Вчера, English: Yesterday), where he portrayed Rostislav, a student in an elite high school in Communist Bulgaria, who rebels against the hollowness of the system and the absurd rules.

After the fall of communism, Staykov moved first to London, and later to Stockholm, Sweden. In Swedish cinema, he typically portrays Eastern European villains. "My Serbian friends refer to me as 'the main bad guy,'" he said in a 2007 interview. "I've played this role for all possible languages which has these 'bad guys' - Russian mafia, Hungarian... Serbian of course. Overall, I play Eastern Europeans. All bad guys who eventually die."

Staykov portrays Alexander Zalachenko, a former Soviet spy, in the 2009 film adaptations of the best-selling "Millennium Trilogy" novels. He said he embraces the role of the villain. "Unfortunately, the underlying opinion is that negative roles are very flat and without strong character. But I disagree. On the contrary, all the characters are flesh and blood, and as Socrates said, 'Nobody is born bad — they are bad due to lack of knowledge.'" He reprised the role of Zalachenko in the six-part Millennium television series that was broadcast on Swedish TV in 2010.

He returned to Bulgarian cinema and acted in the comedy Mission London and the drama Tilt. He also starred in the second season of Bulgarian TV series Undercover (Bulgarian: Под Прикритие), as well as Where's Magi? (Bulgarian: Къде е Маги?), a remake of ¿Dónde Está Elisa?.

== Personal life ==
Staykov lives in Stockholm, where he also teaches acting. He was married to a Swedish opera singer, Marion, for 15 years, until they separated in 2011. They have a son, Albert Nicholas, born in February 2007.
