= Silvia Veleva =

- Undercover character
- First appearance: "Episode 1.1"
- Last appearance: "Episode 2.9"
- Portrayed by: Irena Milyankova

In-universe information
- Gender: Female
- Family: Yoana Veleva (mother); Unknown father
- Nationality: Bulgarian

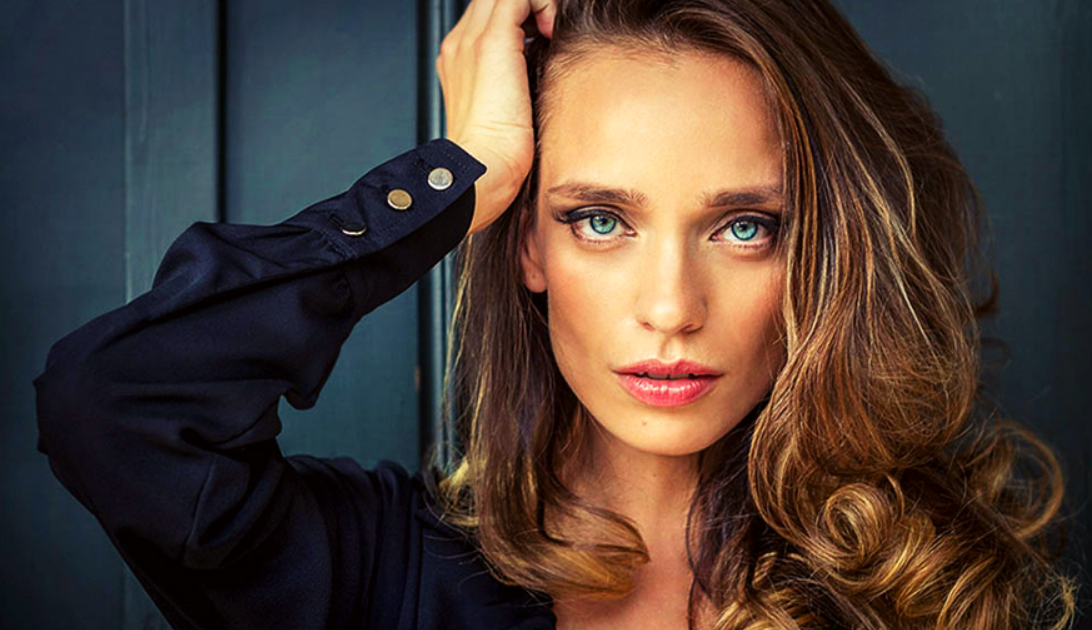
Irena Milyankova-"Sunny"

Silvia Veleva (Bulgarian: Силвия Велева) is a fictional character, one of the main protagonists on the Bulgarian National Television (BNT) crime series Pod Prikritie. She is portrayed by Irena Milyankova. She was Martin Hristov's love interest.

== Life ==
Silvia Veleva, also known as Sunny, is mistress of Petar Tudzarov and, later a lover of Martin Hristov. Her mother, Yoana, believed that it was good for her to be Tudzharov's mistress because in that way she is not going to be poor.

== Description ==
=== Season 1 ===
Sunny met Martin on the night when she was beaten by Tudzharov's men when he saved her. She slept with him in his place that night and vanished the morning after. Sunny later saw Martin in Tudzharov's cafe and realised he is now working for him. She and Martin had a brief strained relationship, but reconciled later and became lovers. Ivo, later, found her bracelet in Martin's bed when places of every male worker of Tudzharov was searched and threat some time Martin. Throughout the first season, Sunny wanted to left Tudzharov and Martin offered her to go with him to Rio. In Episode 1.10, Sunny offered Martin help. She offered him that she wear a bug when go with Tudzharov on a dinner with some powerful people, but Tudzharov found a bug and ordered Ivo to kill her, but instead, Ivo hide her in his house and ordered her not to leave the house.

=== Season 2 ===
In season two, Martin found her and met with her in the night when Ivo was wounded when she went to pharmacy to take some medicines for him. Martin offered her protection in exchange for her testimony, but she refused and told him that she can't testify now. She returned in Ivo's house, where Ivo earlier brought his mother too. When a local criminal was arrested for robbery of the same pharmacy in which Sunny took the medicines, just after she went from there, CCTV footage was shown to criminal's attorney, who happened to be Tudzharov's lawyer too, Boyana Vasileva. Vasileva saw that Sunny is alive and passed it to Tudzharov. Sunny, later, departed Ivo's house and moved to Martin's place. Ivo, then, went to Martin's place and told him to keep her safe and then returned to his house. Tudzharov again ordered her murder. Sunny later agreed to testify and was brought to the court, but was shot and killed by Tudzharov's assassin. Martin chased him to the street where the assassin got hit by the car and died instantly.

In season two finale, Martin was arrested after visiting her grave where he spoke to Ivo.
