= Petar Tudzharov =

- Undercover character
- First appearance: "Episode 1.1"
- Last appearance: "Episode 4.12"
- Portrayed by: Mihail Bilalov

In-universe information
- Gender: Male
- Occupation: Inspector of MDFOC (formerly); Boss of a criminal group
- Family: Nia Tudzharova (daughter)
- Nationality: Bulgarian

Petar Tudzharov also known as "Dzharo" is a fictional character and one of the main antagonists in the BNT crime series Pod Prikritie. He is portrayed by Mihail Bilalov. He was a ruthless Bulgarian gangster who initially served as the loyal member of Bulgarian MDFOC, ex-inspector and wealthy businessman.

== Early life ==
Before he became a Bulgarian crime boss, Tudzharov was an inspector in MDFOC (Main Direction for Fighting Organized Crime) and colleague of inspectors Emil Popov, Mironov and Stolarov. After the incident with some criminals and the deaths of inspector Stolarov and Mironov, Tudzharov left the police end started his own criminal group.

== Description ==
=== Season 1 ===
In the first season Tudzharov was a Bulgarian crime boss. His mistresses was Silvia Veleva better known as Sunny. He went with her on business dinners with his partners in crime. After the incident with bug, Dzharo ordered Ivo Andonov to kill her, but, instead, Ivo hid her in his house and didn't tell Tudzharov what happened with her. After her departure, Dzharo releases a story about her alleged trip to Milano and, later, he got a new mistress, his lawyer Boyana.

=== Season 2 ===
In season two, Dzharo's relationship with Ivo became a little strained, especially when Boyana informed him that Sunny is still alive. Tudzharov again ordered her murder and sent another assassin. The assassin shot and killed her outside of court and later got hit by the car and died instantly. Tudzharov ordered Ivo's murder too which had to look like a car accident, but the attempt failed and Ivo killed his assassin. In season 2 finale, after Martin planted the evidence in his place, Tudzharov and Boyana were arrested. She was shortly after that released and he was brought to the court. When Popov found out about the evidence, Martin offered himself as an anonymous witness and, with his testimony, Tudzharov was sentenced on 37 years of prison.

=== Season 3 ===
In season 3, after Tudzharov was arrested and sentenced, Ivo reunited his crew, The Hook, Adriana, and Zdravko Kiselov, also known as The Hair, and started his own criminal group. Tudzharov, who was in prison, got a new cellmate - a fat prisoner whom Popov sent wired to get a confession from Dzharo, but Dzharo found a microfone. In Episode 3.4, Andonov ordered his murder, but the attempt failed and Tudzharov was hospitalised and, later, sent to house arrest because he paid the judge. After Anvonov's mother Cveta was killed, he became a prime suspect in her murder, but police didn't arrest him because they realised that he had nothing to do with her murder, although, in fact he had everything with her murder - he ordered The Twins to kill her. After the attempt murder on Martin and one of The Twins failed, which Dzharo didn't know, he ordered murder of his lawyer Boyana, too, and, while he listened "The Magic Flute", an unknown assassin killed Boyana. In season 3 finale, Popov found out that Dzharo killed Asya Panteva and reporter Elica Vladeva and ordered a search for him and APB. Dzharo escaped to one hotel, but, there, people who live there found out who he is on news and he was forced to run again. While attempt to start an electric sleds, Ivo, The Hook and Tisho found him and Ivo revealed to him who was the mole all the time. After the brief conversation in which Ivo revealed that what he knows about Dzharo's daughter Nia, Dzharo shot Ivo and ran on electric sleds. The Hook released Martin to go for him. Martin chased Dzharo and, later, the shots were heard, but it is left unknown who was shot.

=== Season 4 ===
In season 4 premiere, Tudzharov was seen in Turkey which means that he succeeded in crossing the border of Bulgaria. There, he dealt a business with his friend Faruk, whose younger son is killed by Ivo. in Episode 4.9, the police break on film shooting where Dzharo was. Dzharo started to run with his partner and they entered the car and escaped, but, during the drive, the car overturned and partner fainted and Dzharo managed to escape, but was injured. Injured, Dzharo was brought in Ivo's house to recover. In Episode 4.10, one of Faruk's men shot on Popov, but killed his daughter instead and Popov saw Dzharo leaving from the scene and marked him as the second assassin. In Episode 4.11, Dzharo's daughter, Nia, was abducted by Faruk's men and Dzharo get the order to come alone and replace daughter. Dzharo came, but also, he called the police and success to release his daughter and ran with her. Later, after Popov's daughter was buried, Dzharo came and said Popov his sorry and that he didn't killed her. They had a brief conversation in which is revealed what happened when shot was heard in season 3 finale. Popov let Dzharo go and promised him, if he comes back in Bulgaria, he is never going to stop chasing him. After that, Tudzharov is killed by Popov because Popov thought he ordered his daughter's murder, although, Tudzharov said him he didn't. In season 4 finale, Martin testified that Dzharo pointed a gun on Popov.

=== Season 5 ===
In season 5 premiere, Dzharo's voice was heard when his daughter, Nia, called the number he left her. On the message to her, it is explained what she has to do. She went in the bank and there, she found her father's legacy. In Episode 5.2, another his message was heard in which it is explained to her what is her legacy left by him.

=== Season 6 ===
In season 6, Dzharo returns through flashbacks that take viewers back to the 2002s, revealing how he built his criminal organisation and became one of the most powerful figures in the underworld. The story explores his early relationships with Ivo and The Hook, the people who helped him rise to power, and the events that shaped his criminal empire. Although Dzharo is dead in the present timeline, his influence continues to affect the lives of the surviving characters.
