= Martin Hristov (Undercover) =

- Undercover character
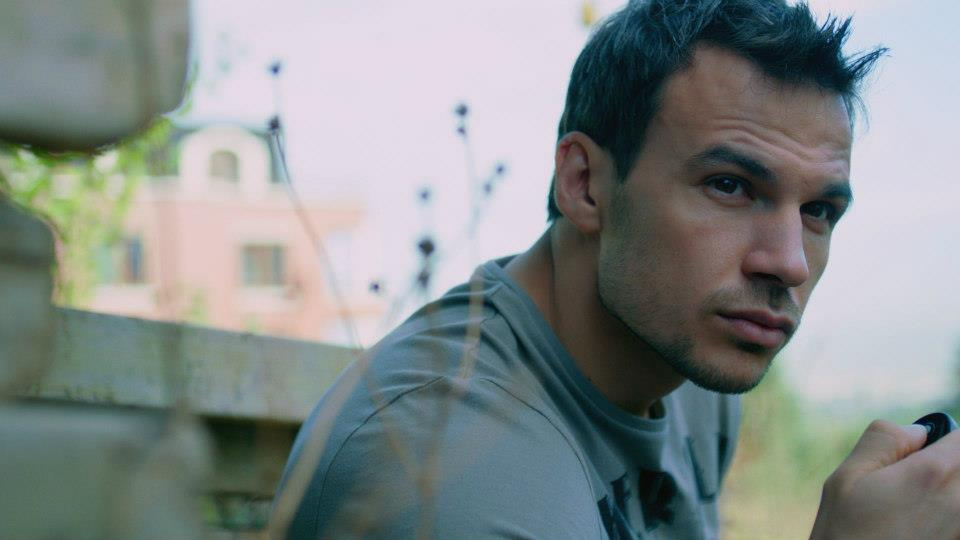
- First appearance: "Episode 1.1"
- Last appearance: "Episode 5.10"
- Portrayed by: Ivaylo Zahariev

In-universe information
- Gender: Male
- Occupation: Main Direction for Fighting Organized Crime
- Affiliation: Bulgarian police
- Family: Kiril Hristov (father, deceased); Unknown mother
- Spouses: Silvia Veleva - Sunny (girlfriend, deceased); Zornica Popova (girlfriend, deceased); Yana Taneva (girlfriend)
- Nationality: Bulgarian

Martin Hristov is a fictional character and one of the main protagonists on the BNT crime series Pod Prikritie. He is portrayed by Ivaylo Zahariev. He is policeman who works for MDFOC.

== Early life ==
When he was a kid, Martin was used by his father as an accomplice in robberies. When Martin and his father got arrested, Martin got in juvenile detention center where he was until he turned 18. When turned 18, Martin was recruited by chief inspector Emil Popov to work for MDFOC (Main Direction for Fighting Organized Crime) as an undercover policeman with code name "Shimmer".

== Description ==
=== Season 1 ===
In series premiere, Popov put him in Petar Tudzharov's group to be an insider and Martin start to reveal informations from the inside of Tudzharov's group about their works. In Episode 1.1, Martin saved Silvia Veleva from being beaten on the street by Tudzharov's men. Martin took her in his place and they had sex. At the end of the same episode, when Martin arrive in cafe owned by Tudzharov, he see Veleva, later revealed to have nickname Sunny, and realises that she is in fact Tudzharov's mistress. Later, he and Sunny became lovers, which was found out by Ivo Andonov, but Ivo didn't tell that anyone. Martin was most upset when Sunny vanished enough to try to persuade Popov in helping him to find Sunny, but Popov refused, so Martin started his own investigation and found out that Sunny is in Ivo's house without Dzharo's knowledge. Martin secretly saw Ivo and Sunny standing on the balcony. Martin than left disappointed. In season one finale, when Martin saved Popov from being killed in fire, Martin was wounded, and when he tried to help Popov, a man put a gun on his had behind him.

=== Season 2 ===
In season two, it is revealed that the man who pointed a gun on Martin is Popov's former colleague Alexander Mironov. Mironov saved Martin and Martin start to work for him too. Mironov used Martin to sabotage Tudzharov's business. Later on, when Tudzharov stopped trusting Ivo, Martin was appointed as his new right hand. In Episode 2.5, Martin was shocked when he saw his father dealing business with Ivo, but Martin and his father behaved as they do not know each other. Later in episode, Martin's father was caught during the mission and that's the last time he and Martin saw each other. In the next episode, Martin revealed to Popov that his father died from heart attack. In Episode 2.11, when Popov and Tudzharov were abducted by Mironov, Martin shot and killed Mironov to prevent him to revealed him as Popov's man in Tudzharov's group. In season two finale, Popov spoke with Martin about arresting Tudzharov and Martin, on his own, planted the evidence in Tudzharov's home and Tudzharov and his lawyer Boyana Vasileva were arrested, but when Popov found out about planting, he told Martin that the judge will most likely dismiss the evidence. Martin voluntarily became an anonymous witness and because of that Tudzharov was sentenced on 37 years. In season two finale, Martin was arrested and sentenced

=== Season 3 ===
In season three premiere, shortly after his arresting, Martin was freed to continue his mission as an insider in Dzharo's group. Popov, who had been promoted to commissioner, had to tell inspector Neshev about Martin's part. When Andonov ordered his murder, Martin began working against him too. In Episode 3.3, when Dzharo was released from prison after the attempted murder on him, he reunited his crew, in which now are Martin and The Twins. In Episode 3.6, Martin saved Popov's daughter Zornica from being killed by Ivo's men. After the attempt murder on him and Tisho The Twin in Episode 3.7, they transferred themselves in The Hook's group in Episode 3.8. In season 3 finale, Martin was kidnapped on Ivo's order and Popov had no choice but to tell that Martin is an undercover cop to the other cops. Martin was tortured by Ivo's man and then, Ivo, The Hook and Tisho drove him with them in mountains to meet with Dzharo. There, Martin was freed by The Hook to go after Dzharo. During the chasing of Dzharo, the shots are heard, but it isn't revealed who was shot.

=== Season 4 ===
In season four, Martin starts to work as a regular inspector in Popov's group. Also, Martin starts a serious relationship with Popov's daughter Zornica which is unknown to Popov. Tisho and The Hook threw out him from their lives and do not to see him anymore. In Episode 4.1, Martin had an incident with one of the inspectors from IAB because Martin hit him in the head. in Episode 4.7, Martin and inspector Manolov were in stake out. When Ivo's men got out of casino they robbed, Martin shot on them, but they managed to escape. Shortly after, Martin met Tisho and Tisho told him to shoot him and he turn his back to Martin. Martin shot the door behind Tisho and the bullets broke through the door and killed Manolov accidentally. Later, Martin resigned from the force. In next episode, Martin drank a full bottle of whiskey. Later, Martin returned on the job. In Episode 4.11, after Popov's daughter was buried he left and Dzharo came. Dzharo and Popov spoke brief and it is revealed what happened in season 3 finale - Dzharo shot Martin, but he didn't kill him and that was the shot heard by Popov and his men. In season finale, after Popov shot Dzharo, Martin saw what happened and staged the scene. Later, Martin and Popov gave their statements, but, after the DA doubted in expertise, Martin pressed the expert to fake another expertise ordered by DA. When Popov was brought in court, Martin testified in his favor, but Popov told the truth and was sentenced. In prison, Popov told Martin he has a man in organization owned by Faruk Aykan, Turkish mobster, - Erol Metin, an undercover cop. Popov also told Martin that Metin is from now his responsibility.

=== Season 5 ===
In season 5 premiere, Martin took over Erol Metin from Popov and the two met in vacant building. Later, Martin was promoted to the chief of the department and replaced Popov. In Episode 5.2, Martin's group got a new colleague, Yana Taneva, but Martin didn't much like her. In Episode 5.5, Martin told her story about his father and relationship with Popov and she told him the story about her parents. During the episode, Martin and Yana started a personal relationship. In Episode 5.6, Martin ended the relationship because, according to him, the relationship with Yana deconcentrates him in business. In Episode 5.7, Martin and his men went in Ivo's factory to apprehend him for drug business, but, one of his men, inspector Kirov was killed during the action and Martin was temporarily removed from chief position and replaced by inspector Zarev in Episode 5.8. In the same episode, Martin managed to convince inspector Todorov to work rogue with him on bringing Ivo down. At the end of episode, Martin and Todorov arrested Erol Metin - undercover cop who working for Martin in Ivo's group. In Episode 5.9, Yana was questioned about Martin's behaviour by IAB and she told the detective that Martin is aggressive and that he has a symptoms of nervous breakdown. Later, Martin got a video of Kirov's killing and his shooting by Roni in factory. After that, he argued with Erol. Later, Martin called Erol on cellphone and told him he sent Ivo a flash with real information about him. In Episode 5.10, Martin was informed by Zarev he is suspended and Martin went first to Popov and they talked. Then, Martin went and bought a bomb. He planted the bomb in Ivo's plane, but Erol came and they started to fight, but Martin knocked Erol down. Martin wanted to detonate the plane, but Erol shot him in the chest. In Episode 5.11, Martin's body was found by the police.

In the same episode, Erol confessed to Popov he killed Martin on the airport and why he killed him.
