= Zahari Baharov =

Bulgarian actor

- Захари Бахаров
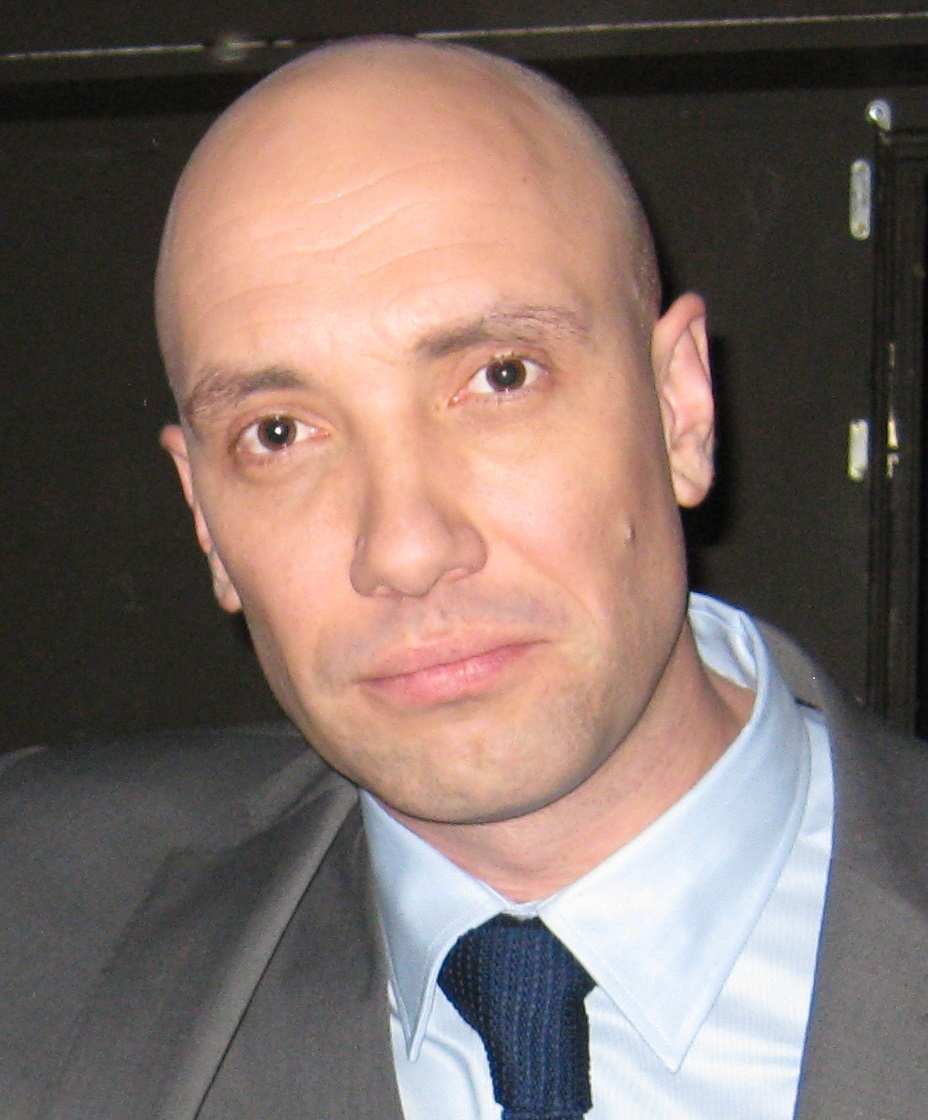
- Baharov in 2013
- Born: Zahari Emilov Baharov; Sofia, Bulgaria
- Occupations: Actor; producer
- Years active: 2003–present
- Children: 2

Zahari Emilov Baharov (Bulgarian: Захари Емилов Бахаров) is a Bulgarian actor, best known for portraying the roles of Moth in Zift (2008), Ivo Andonov in the BNT series Undercover (2011–2016), and Loboda in the HBO series Game of Thrones (2015).

== Early life and education ==
Baharov was raised in the old part of the Ovcha Kupel district. His mother, Müjgan, is of ethnic Turkish origin; she is a philologist and hosts programmes in Turkish on the Bulgarian National Radio.

Baharov attended William Gladstone Secondary School No. 18. After graduating, he majored in acting at the National Academy for Theatre and Film Arts. He has been acting at the Ivan Vazov National Theatre since 2003; his notable theater performances include King Lear (2006), Don Juan (2007), and The Cherry Orchard (2009).

== Career ==
Baharov's first major film role was in Zift (2008), directed by Javor Gardev. After the release of Zift, he quickly gained popularity and won several awards for his performance. In 2011, he starred in Love.net. The following year, he founded the production company Three Bears Entertainment alongside his colleagues and friends Vladimir Karamazov and Yulian Vergov. The company has produced three theatrical productions: Spinach with potatoes by Zoltan Egresi, Art by Yasmina Reza and Dakota by Jordi Galceran.

From 2011 to 2016, Baharov starred in the BNT 1 series Undercover as Ivo Andonov. His performance was positively received by critics, and his character's development was noted as one of the series' highlights. Between 2012 and 2020, he was the host of the television game show National Lottery on Nova. In 2015, Baharov had a one-episode role in the HBO series Game of Thrones, portraying the role of Loboda, the leader of a cannibal tribe.

== Personal life ==
Baharov is in a long-term relationship with Bulgarian journalist Diana Alexieva. They have two children: a son, Maxim (born 2010), and a daughter, Kaya (born 2013).

Baharov's younger brother, Yavor, is also an actor.

== Awards ==
Baharov is the recipient of several accolades, including two Askeers for Best Supporting Actor in King Lear (2006) and Three Days of Rain (2009), an Icarus for Best Supporting Actor in Don Juan (2007), Best Actor at the 2009 Bulgarian Cinema Awards and Best Actor at the 2009 International Film Festival Chungmuro, among more.

== Filmography ==
=== Film ===
Year	Title	Role	Notes
2003	Air Marshal	Mohammed	
2003	Marines	Criminal	Direct-to-video
2006	The Rebel of L	Markucha	
2008	War, Inc.	Video Guy	
2008	Zift	Moth	
2008	Train	Croupier	
2009	Command Performance	Mikhail Kapista	
2009	Universal Soldier: Regeneration	General Topov	
2009	Double Identity	Alexander	
2010	The Glass River	Shepherd Metodi	
2010	The Way Back	Interrogator	
2011	Cold Fusion	Ivo Petchev	Credited as Zahari Emilov
2011	Love.net	Andrey Bogatev	
2011	Operation Shmenti Capelli	Tatko	
2012	El Gringo	Officer Bell	
2012	I Am You	Lachezarov	
2013	Enemies Closer	Saul	
2014	The Monuments Men	Major Elya	
2017	Heights	Ivan	
2019	Uyut	Sabin Palamarkov	
2021	South Wind 2: Speed Up	Kiril	
2024	Tarika	Ali	

=== Television ===
Year	Title	Role	Notes
2003	Marines	Criminal	Television film
2004	Nature Unleashed: Avalanche	Hans	Television film
2005	Locusts: The 8th Plague	Street Preacher	Television film
2006	Joe Petrosino	Guapo alto	Television film
2011–2016	Pod Prikritie	Ivo Andonov	Main role; 60 episodes
2012–2020	National Lottery	Himself (host)	
2015	Game of Thrones	Loboda	Episode: "Hardhome"
2017	Le Bureau des Légendes	Alexei Klebnikov	4 episodes
2017	Genius	Russian General	Episode: ''Einstein: Chapter Six''
2019	Father's Day	Dimo	6 episodes
2019	Baptiste	Nicolae	5 episodes

=== Theater ===
Role	Title	Playwright	Notes
Chance Wayne	Sweet Bird of Youth	Tennessee Williams	Dramatic Theatre Plovdiv
Treplev	The Seagull	Chehov	
Voynitsev	Platonov		Dramatic Theatre Haskovo
Capulets	Romeo and Juliet	Shakespeare	Ivan Vazov National Theatre
Stoyan Popov	Road of Roses and Thorns	Ina Bozhidarova	Ivan Vazov National Theatre
Seaton	Macbeth	Shakespeare	Ivan Vazov National Theatre
Duncan	Macbett	Eugene Ionesco	Ivan Vazov National Theatre
Popcheto	Exiles	Ivan Vazov	Ivan Vazov National Theatre
Vasko	Day Off	Kamen Donev	Ivan Vazov National Theatre
Brides	No Trifling with Love	Alfred de Musset	Ivan Vazov National Theatre
The Fool	King Lear	Shakespeare	Ivan Vazov National Theatre
Sganarel	Don Juan	Moliere	Ivan Vazov National Theatre
	The Old Woman from Calcutta	Sketches by Hanoch Levin; Bulgarian version by Joseph Benatov	Theatre 199
Slavi from "Banishora"	Chamkoriq	Milen Ruskov	Theatre 199
