= Ivo Andonov =

Fictional character

- Undercover character
- First appearance: Episode 1.1
- Last appearance: Episode 6.12
- Portrayed by: Zahary Baharov

In-universe information
- Gender: Male
- Occupation: Right hand man of Petar Tudzharov season 1-2; Leader of a criminal group season 3-5
- Family: Tsveta Andonova (mother, deceased)
- Nationality: Bulgarian

Ivo Andonov is a fictional character and one of the main protagonists of the BNT crime series Undercover (Bulgarian: Pod Prikritie). Andonov is portrayed by Zahari Baharov as an unmerciful and ruthless gangster, who initially served as the loyal right-hand man of a powerful ex-cop, wealthy businessman and Bulgarian mafia boss, Peter Tudzharov (Dzharo). However, Ivo was betrayed by him later.

Andonov eventually takes the seat of his boss as the new ruling crime lord of the Bulgarian mafia after Tudzharov's incarceration and death. Bazarov's performance received critical acclaim, and Andonov's character development was noted as one of the series' highlights as the antithesis to Martin Hristov's character, one of the other main protagonists.

== Early life ==
As the son of a family of physicians, Ivo studied in elite schools and was a university graduate. When he was very young, his parents relocated to Israel for work and Ivo was left in the care of a distant aunt. Eventually, he turned to criminal life among street gangs. This impressed Dzharo, who was in the midst of building a criminal empire.

== Description ==
As Dzharo's violent and feared right-hand man, Ivo is not a typical criminal, viewing everything as a military organization. He is a fan of various terrorist factions and thinks of himself as fighting an unfair system. He uses cocaine and drinks heavily, knowing this enhances his aggression. His greatest fear is that his life might end peacefully in an old-age home. He dreams of dying a heroic death, to be known as a legend to the coming generations.

== Appearances ==
=== Season 1 ===
In the first season, Andonov is introduced as Dzharo's right-hand-man and the leader of Dzharo's gang. Andonov is described as special by Emil Popov, who urges Hristov to be incredibly careful around him. Andonov is portrayed as a sadistic, manipulative, violent, and highly intelligent man. From their first meeting, Andonov guesses correctly that Hristov is actually an undercover cop. Throughout the series, Andonov is the only criminal who knows Hristov's true identity. Because of his disdain for Hristov, Andonov tries to prove to his boss that Hristov is actually a police officer. In Episode 1.2 we are introduced to his mother Cveta whose presence is hidden from everyone, showing a clear sign of weakness. She does not know that her son has turned to crime. Andonov and Tudzharov's relationship becomes increasingly tainted as Hristov starts to outperform him, simultaneously gaining Tudzharov's trust. When Tudzharov orders him to kill Sunny, a woman Andonov is in love with, he defies his boss and keeps her alive and hidden from him.

=== Season 2 ===
In Season 2, Ivo begins to stray bit-by-bit from Tudzharov's path. In Episode 2.6 he concocts a plan with Rosen Gatzov, also known as The Hook, to rob the van transporting cash from the shopping mall to the bank. During the robbery, he and Gatzov are ambushed by police led by Emil Popov. Andonov and Gatzov run and Ivo is injured during the chase. He returns to his house and his mother sends Sunny to the pharmacy for medicine. When a local criminal is arrested for having looted the same pharmacy, the CCTV footage is shown to his defense attorney who also happens to be Tudzharov's lawyer, Boyana Vasileva. Vasileva notifies Tudzharov that Sunny is alive, and Dzharo orders Andonov killed. Ivo is able to kill the assassin and later he leaves Dzharo's group and starts his own. Later on, Sunny moves out of Ivo's house and moves in with Hristov. Ivo then goes to Hristov's place and tells him to keep her safe. As he returns to his home after the conversation with Hristov, Ivo sees that the police had arrested Dzharo.

=== Season 3 ===
In Season 3, after Tudzharov is arrested and sentenced, Ivo reunites his crew; The Hook, Adriana, and Zdravko Kiselov, also known as The Hair, and starts his own criminal group. Later, Ivo recruits a new man, Krum, to be his right hand. In Episode 3.1, Ivo orders Hristov's murder, but the attempt fails. In Episode 3.4, Tudzharov had orders the murder of Ivo's mother. Ivo arrives at his mother's place too late and sees her lying on the floor, dead. He sits down, taking her head in his arms, and weeps. In Episode 3.5, Ivo starts to work as a pimp and VAT fraudster. In Episode 3.8, Ivo is arrested on three counts - VAT fraud, pimping, and murder. During the conversation with inspector Popov, who arrested him, Ivo plays a video of Popov's daughter snorting cocaine. In Episode 3.8, after the conflict with general Penev, Ivo orders his murder and the general is killed outside a restaurant. In Episode 3.9, Ivo plans a gold heist, which was successful, but, later, the police found where the gold was hidden and seized it. In the season 3 finale, Ivo orders Hristov's kidnapping. Later, he meets Dzharo along with The Hook and Tisho and reveals that he knows about Dzharo's daughter Nia. Dzharo, furious, shoots Ivo and escapes. The Hook frees Hristov to go after him and knelt near Ivo. Ivo gives him his cellphone and tells him that he is expecting a call. He closes his eyes and the phone rings. Tisho and the Hook are able to see the identity of the caller. When Popov arrives, Tisho and The Hook have disappeared. Popov has Ivo sent to the hospital.

=== Season 4 ===
It is revealed in Season 4 that Ivo survived the shooting and was in a relationship with Dzharo's daughter, Nia. Ivo was disabled during the assassination attempt and now walks with a cane. In Episode 4.3, Ivo orders Dzharo's murder, but the attempt fails. Ivo tells Nia that he knows of a meeting she had with Dzharo and that he needs to be able to trust her. Later, Ivo is arrested for drug trafficking by Hristov and Inspector Zarev, but he is quickly released. In Episode 4.5, he is abducted by Lizzard's men and is tortured. The Hook manages to free Ivo from his captors. In Episode 4.7, Ivo and his men rob Dzaro's and Bardem's casino. In the next episode, several of Ivo's places are blown up by Dzharo's Turkish men. Later, Ivo is arrested for the murder of one of the prostitutes. Ivo is informed by his lawyer that his semen was found in her vagina, but Ivo tells him that they only had oral sex. The lawyer states that the police could hold him captive for another 72 hours and that the DA will order his arrest. In the same episode, Ivo sends his men a second time, to kill Dzharo but they fail again. In Episode 4.9, Ivo is released after the girl who had testified against him changed her original statement. Hristov found out from Adi that Dzharo had paid the woman to accuse Ivo. Later, she is found dead. In the season finale, Ivo informs The Hook that he was going to meet Faruk, but he sent The Hook to the meeting in his place.

=== Season 5 ===
In the Season 5 Premiere, Ivo takes over Dzharo's heroin business and frees The Hook from prison. In Episode 5.2, Ivo finds out about Dzharo's drug business with Italians and his nickname "Il Cane" (in Italian "The Dog"). Ivo then goes to Rome where he finds out that Nia was already there when she came to meet him. In Episode 5.9, Ivo sends his associate Dimitriev to pay off the customs officer, but Dimitriev and the officer are both arrested. Later, Ivo finds out the officer called Nia five times and went to her apartment, revealing that he knows she is trying to blackmail him. He then assaults and rapes her. In Episode 5.11, after Hristov's body is found, Tower control asks Ivo to return to the airport. He returns to the airport and he and Nia see Hristov's body as they leave the plane. Ivo and Nia return to the cafe. Erol, a policeman Hristov planted in Ivo's gang, visits Ivo and tells him that he killed Hristov.

In the final moments of the final episode, Ivo is shot by a policeman with a sniper rifle.
