= Ivaylo Zahariev =

Bulgarian actor

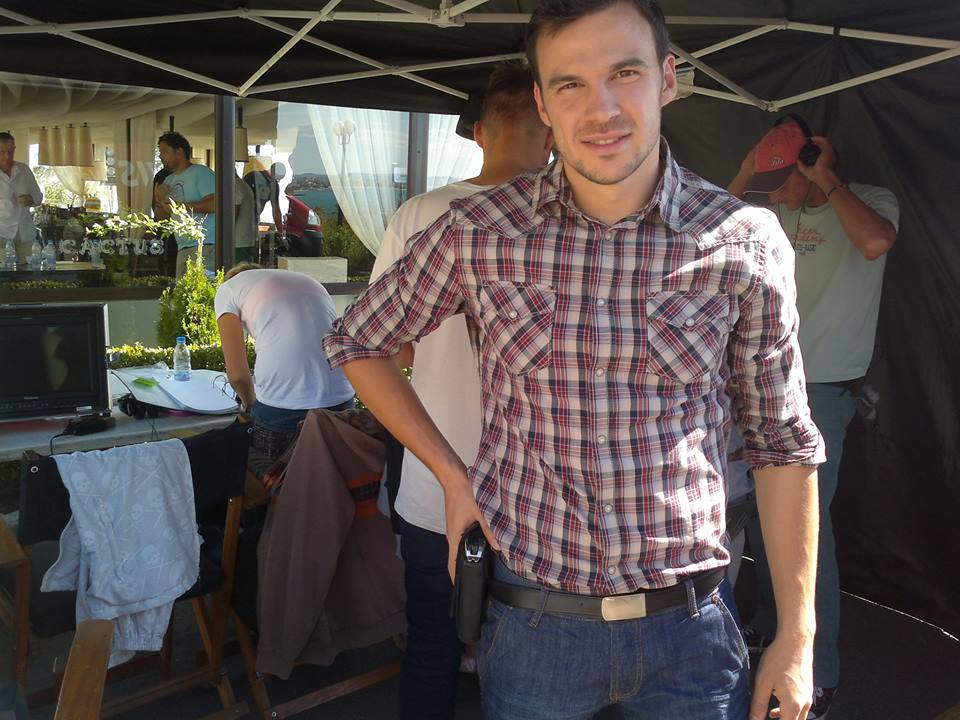
- Zahariev in 2014
- Born: October 4, 1984 (age 42); Sofia, Bulgaria
- Citizenship: Bulgarian
- Occupations: Actor, model
- Years active: 2008-present
- Known for: Pod Prikritie
- Spouse: Stanislava Zahariev
- Children: Philip Zahariev; Damyan Zahariev
- Parent(s): Vasil Zahariev; Rumyanka Zaharieva
- Family: Alexander Zahariev (brother)

Ivaylo Zahariev (Bulgarian: Ивайло Захариев) is a Bulgarian actor, best known for his leading role as the undercover cop Martin in the BNT 1 drama series Pod Prikritie (Undercover) which has been sold to 184 territories across 3 continents. Beyond his acting career Zahariev actively supports various social causes, including addictions prevention, access to information and cultural resources for the Deaf community, children and young people's rights, protection of marriage as a social institution. He also advocates for Christian values and other charitable and social initiatives.

== Early life ==
In 2003, Zahariev graduated 151st Secondary School in Sofia specialising in acting for dramatic theatre. He subsequently studied acting at the "National Academy Krastyo Sarafov" (Krastyo Sarafov National Academy for Theatre and Film Arts), graduating in 2007 under professor Atanas Atanasov. During his studies, he appeared in several theatrical productions including "Manners Table" (as Tom), "Being Dzheymi Fostar" (as Leon), "Ivanov" (in the title role). He also appeared in student films including Good Students (as Leung), based on the story by Boris Vian and directed by Vito Bonev, and "Sofia-Amsterdam" (as the husband), alongside other student productions.

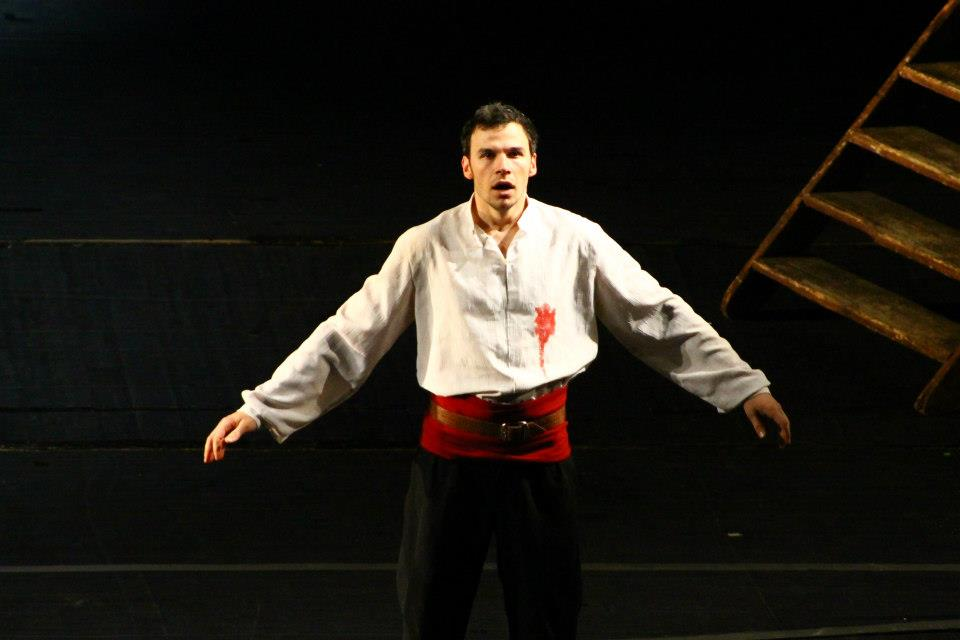
Ivaylo Zahariev as Lazar in Zhelezniyat Svetilnik by Veliko Tarnovo Theatre

After graduating, Zahariev began working as a freelance actor, appearing in independent theatre productions and as a guest performer various in theatre companies. He also appeared in commercials, television programmes and films. In March 2014, he made his debut as guest presenter on the Bulgarian National Television Programme "Up Close with Maria".

Zahariev gained widespread recognition for his leading role in the BNT crime drama series Undercover. He has been a member of the Union of Bulgarian Actors since 2012.

His professional theatre credits include "The Iron Candlestick" directed by Dimiter Sharkov at the Music and Drama Theatre in Veliko Tarnovo, in which he portrayed Lazar; "Saviour" - a production by the theatre company Gang, directed by Valentin Balabanov, in which he played Spas; and "Agents", an adaptation of David Mamet's play Glengarry Glen Ross, staged at the "Vasil Drumev" theatre in Shoumen under the direction of Vladimir Penev, in which he portrayed Ricky Roma. He also participated in several sign language theater productions with the "Mime art" project and others.

== Career ==
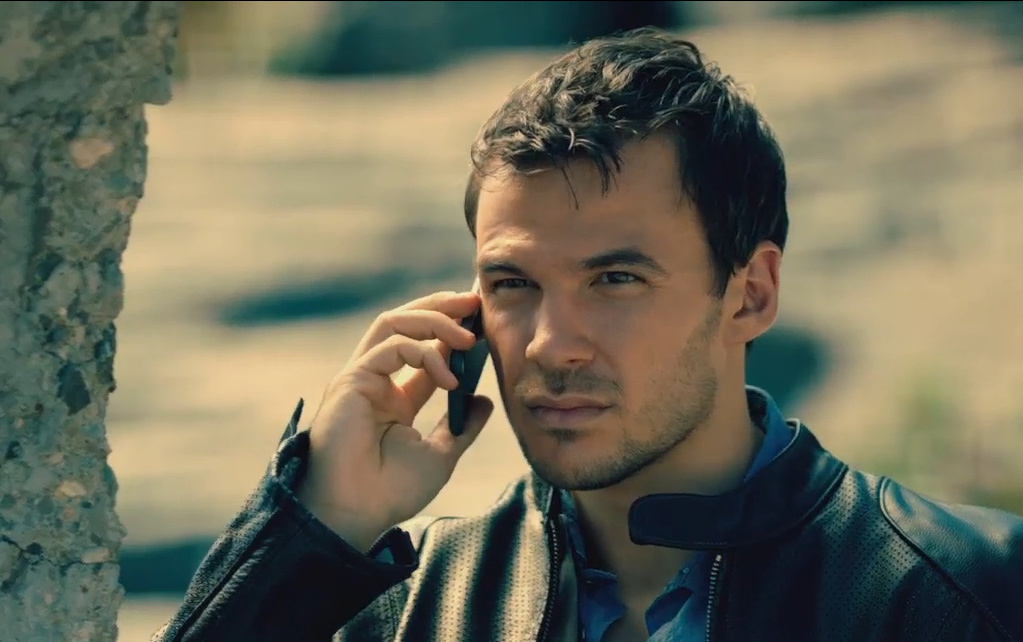
Ivaylo Zahariev as Martin (Pod Prikritie)

Zahariev made his feature film debut as Alex in Number 1, a film produced by Bulgarian National Television (BNT) and directed by Atanas Hristoskov. The film explores the theme of violence among students set against the backdrop of Bulgarian Hip Hop Culture BG Hip Hop.

== Personal life ==
Ivaylo Zahariev was born on 4 October 1984, and grew up in Nadezhda neighborhood of Sofia, Bulgaria with his parents Rumyanka and Vasil Zahariev and his older brother, Alexander. In 2012, he married Miryana after a brief relationship. He has two sons Philip and Damyan.

Ivaylo identifies as Protestant Christian. He speaks openly about his faith in God and regularly attends Sunday church services.

== Filmography ==
=== Film and television ===
Year	Title	Role	Notes
2008	War Correspondent	The Blacksmith	
2010	Hunting Down Small Predators	Small Gravedigger	
2011	Number 1	Alex	
2011–2016	Undercover	Martin Hristov	Lead role; 60 episodes
2011	Love.net	The Waiter	
2012	Pistol, Suitcase and Three stinking barrels	The Beautiful	
2018	South Wind	Hristo	
2019–2021	Road of Honor - Movie series	Kaloyan Stankov	

=== Music video ===
Year	Title	Artist
2013	Souvenir	Miro
2016	If Love Was a Crime	Poli Genova

== Social activities ==
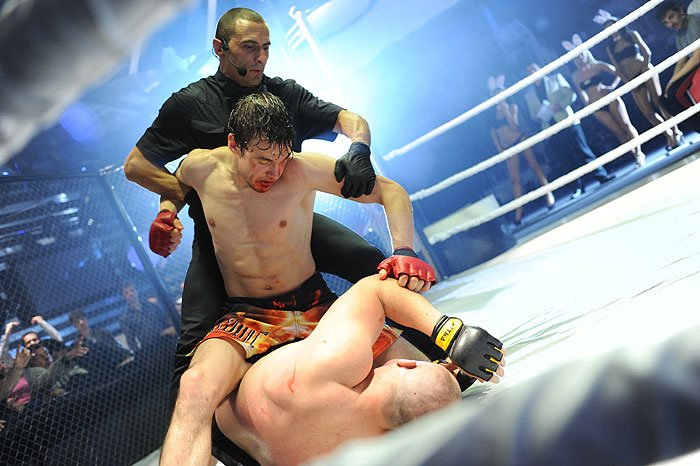
Zahariev in MMA fight (2014)

Ivaylo Zahariev is actively involved in supporting people struggling from substance use disorder (drug addiction) through the ministry "Exit". Together with his best friend Ivo Oreshkov, a wedding photographer, and other volunteers he organise weekly meetings for people seeking help with addiction.

In 2013 and 2014, Zahariev and his family participated in protests against the "Oresharski" government as part of the protest network. He has also been involved in initiatives organised by Foundation for Social Change and inclusion, Teach, Holiday Heroes, the Bulgarian Book Association, az-deteto.com and other organisations.
