= Emil Popov =

- Undercover character
- First appearance: "Episode 1.1"
- Last appearance: "Episode 5.12"
- Portrayed by: Vladimir Penev

In-universe information
- Gender: Male
- Occupation: Inspector of MDFOC (formerly); Commissioner of MDFOC
- Family: Zornica Popova (daughter, deceased)
- Spouse: Margarita Popova (wife, divorced); Dorotea Terziska (girlfriend)
- Nationality: Bulgarian

Emil Popov is a fictional character and one of the main protagonists on the BNT crime series Pod Prikritie. He is portrayed by Vladimir Penev. He is a Bulgarian policeman who works everything by the book.

== Early life ==
As a young policeman, Popov worked with inspectors Tudzharov, Mironov and Stelyanov. But, later, Mironov and Stelyanov were killed and Tudzharov left the police, so, Popov stayed alone.

== Description ==
=== Season 1 ===
In the first season, Popov recruited Martin Hristov to be his insider in Dzharo's group and to pass the informations from the inside. In Episode 1.2, Popov's wife and daughter first appear. It seemed that Popov is having trouble in his marriage, because his wife believed his job is much relevant to him then his marriage. When his daughter brought her boyfriend home to meet her parents, Popov throw him out in the middle of the dinner because he realised that his daughter's boyfriend is a bad for her. In season 1 finale, Popov was kidnaped by Tudzharov's men and brought in the depo where Tudzharov beat him and, later, set up the fire in a tram in attempt to kill him and left. Later, Martin got there and saved him, but was shot. Mironov, who returned in Bulgaria an episode earlier, pointed a gun on a back of his head.

=== Season 2 ===
In season two, Popov continue to manhunt Tudzharov and his men. Popov became a little jealous when his daughter told him about his wife's friend from the school, so Popov one night followed her, but saw that she met with her girlfriend from the school and returned home. Later, Popov found a message on his wife's cellphone from someone named "Tony" and his wife told him that it is her girlfriend Tony. His marriage got even more strained when his wife is raped by her friend from the school Anton Damyanov in Episode 2.9. Popov found out about the event in season 2 finale and, when the police came in Damyanov's apartment and found him lying on the floor shot, he knelt down next to him and pressed his wound hardly and told him who he is. Popov later arrested Tudzharov and brought him to the court where he was sentenced on 37 years of prison.

=== Season 3 ===
In season 3, after Tudzharov was released in a house arrest, Popov continue to investigate him and Ivo too. Popov's marriage fall apart when he found out that his wife left him. In Episode 3.1, after Martin's arrest, Popov was forced to tell Neshev who Martin really is and Neshev started to work with Martin too. In Episode 3.4 and Episode 3.5, Popov became worried when he thought his daughter was missing and didn't know that she actually went with her friend on a party and, later, overslept in her place. Popov, later, found his daughter's note that she is going on a party in mountain and that she is fine. In that moment, he was speaking to a colleague over the phone about starting an investigation about his missing daughter, but, when he read the note, he cancelled the investigation. Popov also informed his wife about her disappearance and, later, when his daughter returned, his wife suggest him that is better for their daughter to come to live with her, but Popov responded that she is big enough to make her own decision about with whom she wants to live. In Episode 3.8, Popov arrested Ivo and Ivo showed him a clip on his cellphone showing Zornica taking drugs and, because of that, Popov let Ivo go. Later, the secretary of police questioned him about fake signature of ex-commissioner Slavov and revealed that the expertise showed it was Popov who faked it. As a result, the secretary suspended Popov from work. In next episode, with the help of Martin, Popov managed to return on his position on the job. In Episode 3.11, he found out that somebody copied Martin's file from his safe and it is revealed in season 3 finale that it was another cop from his group. Popov arrested him and, later, while he spoke with Martin over the cellphone, Martin was kidnapped and Popov started search for Martin and was forced to tell the other colleagues about who Martin is. The search for Martin led Popov on chasing for Ivo and Dzharo too. Near the end of Episode 3.12, Popov found Ivo shot and continue to search for Dzharo, but, during the search, Popov and cops heard the shot and Popov told them to stay and he went alone to find what is going on. It isn't explained what happened in season 3 finale until season 4 finale.

=== Season 4 ===
In season 4, Popov and his group had been moved to a new office where they are now working with Martin too. In Episode 4.3, Popov started to go out with DA Terziska. In Episode 4.5, the two of them had been caught by Popov's daughter, Zornica, in his place. After that, Zornica ran out. In Episode 4.7, after one of Popov's men was killed by mistake by Martin, Martin returned his badge and gun to Popov. In Episode 4.8, Popov went to Martin's place and found Martin drunk. Popov threw him in the shower cabin and poured cold water on him to sober him up. After that, the two talked and Martin later returned to work. After his daughter got mistakenly killed because he was the real target, Popov met with Tudzharov on the cemetery and shot him in the head. Later, he admitted to the court his murder, but Martin testified that Popov shot him because Tudzharov pointed a gun on him. In episode 4.10, Popov was informed by his man in Faruk's group his going to be killed, so Popov was put under protection detail along with his family. When Popov got out of the restaurant with his daughter, Dzharo had to pull the trigger to kill him, but he couldn't, so the other assassin shot. He shot two bodyguards. Popov was shot in the bulletproof, but his daughter was shot too. Popov got up and knelt near her and he found out she died. Seconds later, Martin came. In Episode 4.11, Popov buried his daughter, but at the end of the funeral, Dzharo came. They had a brief conversation and it is revealed what happened in season 3 finale - Popov let Dzharo go and promised him he's not going to stop chasing Dzharo if Dzharo returns in Bulgaria. After that, Popov returned him back, but a few seconds later, he turn over to him, pointed a gun on Dzharo and killed him in cold blood. In season finale, IAB started the investigation about Dzharo's shooting. Popov and Martin gave their statements, but the DA doubt in it, so he arranged another ballistic expertise, but Martin pressed the expert to fake the expertise. Later, Popov is brought to the court where Martin testified in his favor, but the DA called Popov as a witness and asked him what really happened on the cemetery and Popov didn't spoke a few seconds and, finally, he told to the court he killed Petar Tudzharov because he is a criminal and drug dealer and because he killed his daughter. Popov was then arrested. In prison, Popov met with Martin and told him he has a man in organization owned by Faruk Aykan, Turkish mobster, Erol Metin, an undercover cop.

=== Season 5 ===
In season 5, Popov is in prison sentenced for Dzharo's murder. He there had been visited by his girlfriend Dorotea (in Episode 5.1) and Martin (in Episode 5.2). In a visit, Martin told Popov he must get out of prison. In Episode 5.3, Popov had a visit - Yana Taneva - and they talked. Later, Popov asked one of the guards to buy him Verdi's "La traviata" which the guard did. Popov, then, started the CD in the radio and broke the second CD and cut his veins with the sharp part. In Episode 5.4, the guard had been informed about Popov's suicide attempt and he ran into the cell and found Popov unconscious and Popov was immediately hospitalized. In hospital, he was informed by his girlfriend Dorotea that the charges against him are dropped. After he got released from the hospital, Popov moved in Dorotea's flat. In Episode 5.6, Dorotea informed Martin about Popov's disappearance and Martin started to look for him and found him near the lake living in camper and Popov told him he needs to be alone. In Episode 5.7, Popov had two visits - from Erol and from Dorotea. In Episode 5.9, while he was fishing with his new friend, Popov read on one page of newspaper friend was reading, Dorotea became a judge. Popov called her and they talked briefly and Popov ended the call. In Episode 5.11, Popov was visited by Erol and they talked about Martin whereabouts. Moments later, Zarev called Popov on the cellphone and informed him Martin was killed. Popov went outside and was followed by Erol and Popov told Erol he wants son of a bitch who killed Martin. Later, chief Benishev informed the group that Popov returns on the job. Popov returned and led the investigation about Martin's murder. He ordered questioning of every member of Ivo's group. Later, Popov watched the footage from security camera near the airport and saw familiar car and asked Erol to meet with him. They met and Popov told Erol the police is closer to close a case. In the evening, Popov returned to his flat and Erol came to visit him and confessed he killed Martin and why he did it. Then, Popov handcuffed him and called the police to send him a car with the escort.

In season finale, Popov freed Erol Metin, cancelled the police car and sent him in Ivo's group undercover to spy them. After that, Popov started a big investigation and manhunt on Ivo and his men. Ivo ran with Erol, but when they were in a corn field, Ivo realized Erol is a cop and shot them, but didn't kill him. After that, Ivo pointed a gun on a police officers and Popov ordered his hit and officer with sniper rifle killed Ivo instantly. When officers brought wounded Erol, Popov hugged him and told him that his mission is accomplished.
