= Undercover (Bulgarian TV series) =

Bulgarian crime drama television series

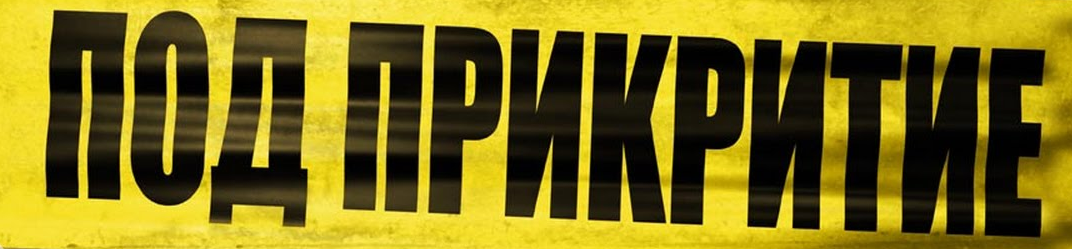
- The logo of the series used for posters and multimedia covers, featuring yellow police tape.
- Bulgarian: Под прикритие
- Genre: Crime drama
- Created by: Dimitar Mitovski
- Starring: Ivaylo Zahariev; Irena Miliankova; Zahary Baharov; Vladimir Penev; Mihail Bilalov; Alexander Sano; Deyan Donkov; Kiril Efremov; Ventsislav Yankov; Ivaylo Hristov; Marian Valev; Hristo Mutafchiev; Tzvetana Maneva; Georgi Staykov; Petar Popyordanov; Boyko Krastanov; Yoanna Temelkova
- Country of origin: Bulgaria
- Original language: Bulgarian
- No. of seasons: 6
- No. of episodes: 72 (list of episodes)

Production
- Executive producer: Elitsa Dimitrova
- Running time: 50 min
- Production companies: Bulgarian National Television; Camera Ltd.

Original release
- Network: BNT 1
- Release: 17 April 2011-

Undercover (Bulgarian: Под Прикритие, romanized: Pod Prikritie, pronounced [ˈpɔt priˈkritiɛ]) is a Bulgarian crime drama television series produced by Bulgarian National Television that premiered on BNT 1 on 17 April 2011. On 20 March 2016, the fifth season premiered on BNT 1. It was announced that it was the final season of the series.

In February 2024 BNT 1 announced that they will start filming a new sixth season of the series. It is expected to broadcast in 2026.

The series tells the story of the undercover police officer Martin Hristov (Ivaylo Zahariev), who infiltrates the gang of Bulgarian mafia boss Petar 'Dzaro' Tudzharov (Mihail Bilalov).

== Plot summary ==
Martin Hristov, a specially trained agent, is appointed to go undercover in the gang of Bulgaria's top mafia boss, Dzharo. On his way he faces numerous challenges in order to completely become part of the criminal world. His task becomes more complicated when he meets the big boss' girl, Sunny. While undercover he gets a promotion in the mafia hierarchy and becomes part of the world full of crime, violence and corruption.

The show is inspired by Martin Scorsese's 2006 film The Departed.

== Cast ==
- Ivaylo Zahariev as Martin Hristov
- Irena Miliankova as Silvia Veleva - Sunny (season 1–2)
- Zahary Baharov as Ivo Andonov
- Vladimir Penev as Inspector Emil Popov
- Mihail Bilalov as Petar Tudzharov - Dzharo (season 1–4)
- Alexander Sano as Zdravko Kiselov - The Hair (season 1–3)
- Deyan Donkov as Vasil Nikolov (season 1–2)
- Kiril Efremov as Tihomir Gardev - Tisho the Twin (main: season 1–3; recurring: seasons 4–5)
- Ventsislav Yankov as Nikolay Rashev - Niki the Twin (season 1–3)
- Ivaylo Hristov as Kiril Hristov, Martin's father (main: season 1; guest: season 2)
- Marian Valev as Rosen Gatzov - The Hook
- Hristo Mutafchiev as Alexander Mironov (main: season 2; recurring: season 1; guest: season 3)
- Tzvetana Maneva as Cveta Andonova, Ivo's mother (main: seasons 2–3; recurring: season 1)
- Georgi Staykov as Anton Damyanov (season 2)
- Petar Popyordanov as Momchil Neshev (season 2–3)
- Boyko Krastanov as Erol Metin (main: season 5; recurring: season 4)
- Yoanna Temelkova as Nia Tudzharova (main: season 5; recurring: season 4)

== Episodes ==
Season	Episodes	Originally released	
Season	Episodes	First released	Last released
1	12	April 17, 2011	July 3, 2011
2	12	November 20, 2011	February 5, 2012
3	12	November 25, 2012	February 17, 2013
4	12	January 19, 2014	April 6, 2014
5	12	March 20, 2016	June 4, 2016
6	12	October 10, 2026	December 26, 2026

== Critical reception ==
Undercover has received critical acclaim as well as becoming a hit with viewers, managing to attract a strong audience from its debut. Critic Emil Antonov said the show "offers viewers a dynamic and tense atmosphere, and interesting characters in a crime drama attractive to much of the native audience. Although many of the stories in the new Bulgarian cinema navigate around the time of transition and development of crime in Bulgaria, Dimitar Mitovski manages to break this pattern. He creates a story that strikes a chord with Bulgarians and is dynamic enough to keep us distracted from our daily lives."

The series received five nominations for the Golden Nymph Award at the 2012 Monte-Carlo Television Festival: Sevda Shishmanova, Dimitar Mitovski and Ivan Doiko as Outstanding European Producer (Drama Series) and Outstanding International Producer (Drama Series); Mihail Bilalov and Zahary Baharov as Outstanding Actor in a Drama Series; and Irena Miliankova as Outstanding Actress in a Drama Series. Undercover also won "The Golden Umbrella" award for Best Series, as well as awards for best cinematography, best musical score and most popular series at the 2012 MediaMixx International Festival, devoted to all forms of media in Central and Eastern Europe.

However, the show has been criticized in Bulgaria for its depiction of graphic violence, sexual situations, profanity and drug use. During the fourth season, BNT head Vera Ankova threatened to pull state funding from the show, putting the series' future in doubt. Additionally, Bulgaria's Council for Electronic Media (CEM) demanded the series be fined for profanity and said its content was not suitable for its 20:45 timeslot. State regulators declined to fine the network so long as the show was moved to a later time slot.

== International broadcast ==
While the first episode was in production, Fox Crime began negotiations to distribute the film internationally in other Balkan nations Romania, Slovenia, Bosnia and Herzegovina, Macedonia, Croatia, Montenegro, Albania and Serbia. The early demand to distribute a series was a first for a BNT production.

In 2012, New Films International announced plans to distribute the series in China, Germany, France, Great Britain, Turkey and throughout Latin America.

In 2014, Netflix released the series in France.
