= Alexandra Feigin =

Bulgarian figure skater (born 2002)

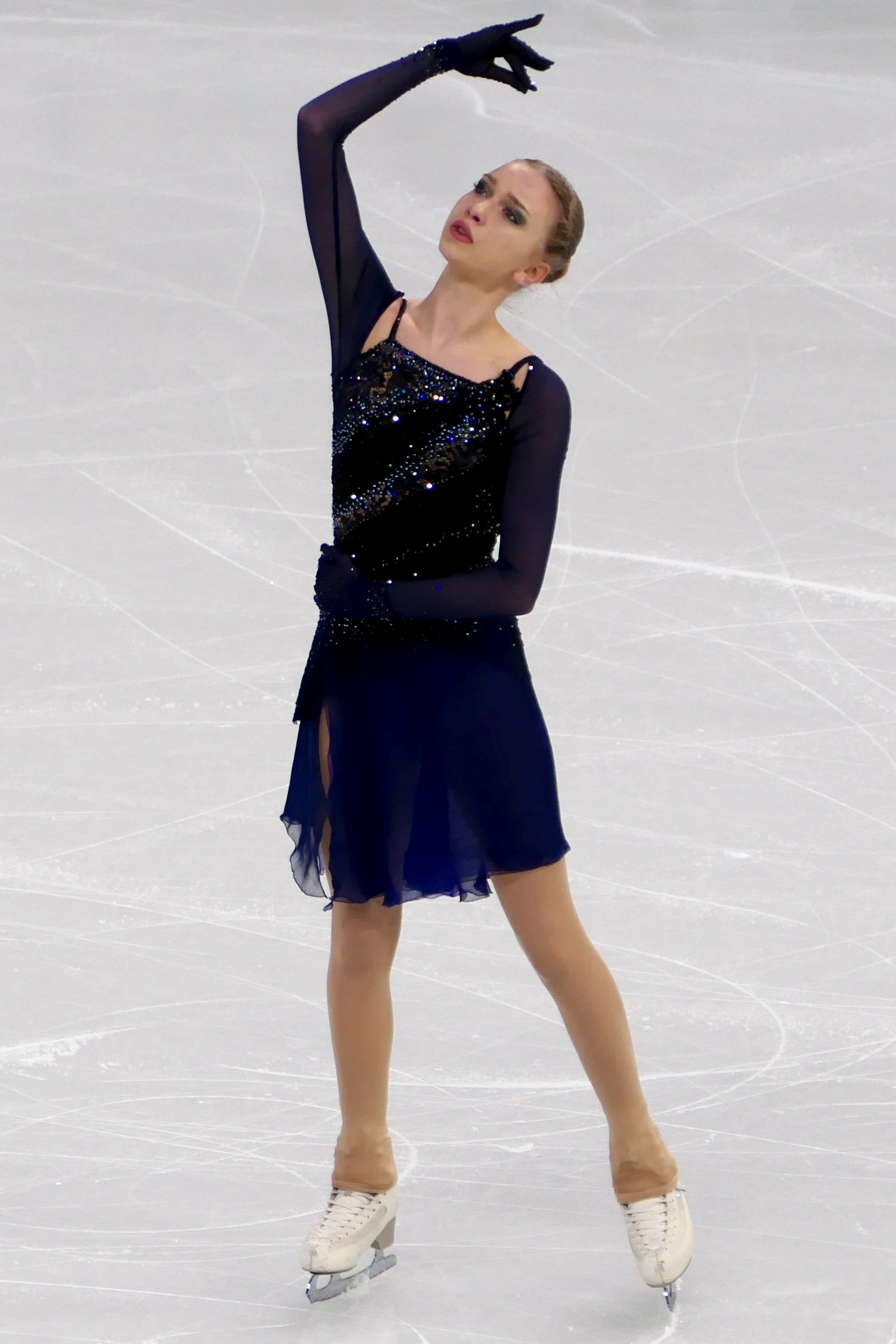
- Alexandra Feigin at the 2024 World Championships

Personal information
- Native name: Александра Фейгин
- Other names: Aleksandra Feygin; Sasha
- Born: 22 December 2002 (age 23) Jerusalem, Israel
- Home town: Sofia, Bulgaria
- Height: 1.69 m (5 ft 7 in)

Figure skating career
- Country: Bulgaria
- Discipline: Women's singles
- Coach: Andrei Lutai; Ina Lutai
- Skating club: Ice Dance Denkova-Staviski Skating Club
- Began skating: 2007
- Highest WS: 28th (2020–21)

Medal record
Bulgarian Championships
| Gold medal – first place | 2017 Sofia | Singles |
| Gold medal – first place | 2019 Sofia | Singles |
| Gold medal – first place | 2020 Sofia | Singles |
| Gold medal – first place | 2023 Sofia | Singles |
| Gold medal – first place | 2024 Sofia | Singles |
| Gold medal – first place | 2025 Sofia | Singles |
| Gold medal – first place | 2026 Sofia | Singles |

Alexandra Feigin (Bulgarian: Александра Фейгин; born 22 December 2002) is a Bulgarian figure skater. She is a two-time Sofia Trophy champion (2019, 2020), the 2019 Denkova-Staviski Cup champion, the 2018 Crystal Skate of Romania champion, and a seven-time Bulgarian national champion (2016, 2018–19, 2022–25). She represented Bulgaria at the 2022 and 2026 Winter Olympics.

== Personal life ==
Feigin was born on 22 December 2002 in Jerusalem, Israel. She moved with her parents to Sofia, Bulgaria at a young age.

== Career ==
=== Early years ===
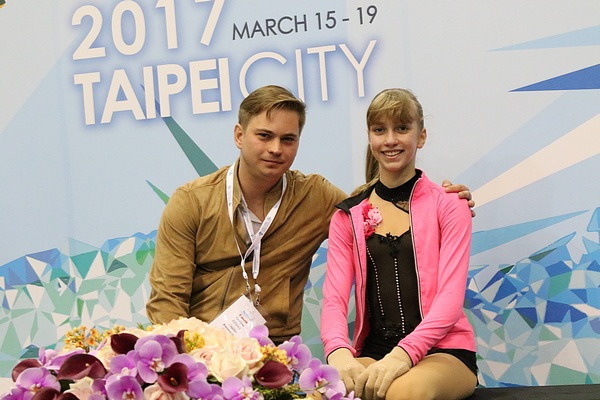
Feigin with longtime coach, Andrei Lutai, at the 2017 World Junior Championships

Feigin started learning to skate in 2009 at the age of five due to her father, a former hockey player, constantly bringing her to the rink with him. In 2010, Feigin began training under coaches, Andrei and Ina Lutai. That same year, she began competing internationally for Bulgaria. From November 2013 through February 2016, she competed in the advanced novice ranks.

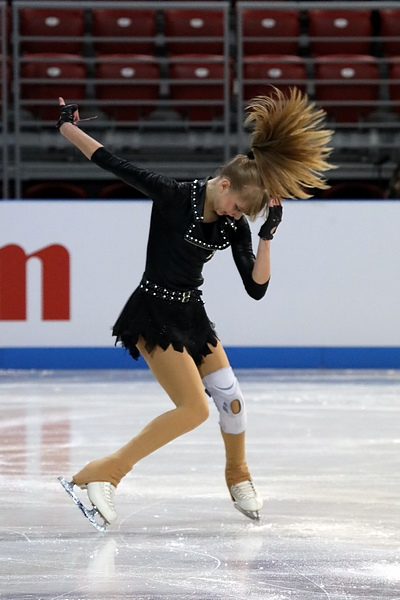
Feigin at the 2018 World Junior Championships

Her ISU Junior Grand Prix (JGP) debut came in August 2016. In March, she competed at the 2017 World Junior Championships in Taipei, Taiwan. She was ranked 25th in the short program and missed the cutoff for the free skate.

Feigin qualified to the final segment at the 2018 World Junior Championships in Sofia, Bulgaria; she finished fifteenth overall after placing seventeenth in the short program and fifteenth in the free skate.

=== 2018–2019 season: Senior international debut ===
Feigin began her season on the JGP series, placing eleventh in Slovakia and eighth in Canada. Making her senior international debut, she won gold at the Crystal Skate of Romania in October and at the Denkova-Staviski Cup in November.

Feigin made her debut at a senior ISU championship at the 2019 European Championships, where she placed eleventh. She placed twenty-second at the 2019 World Junior Championships and then made her senior World Championship debut in Saitama, where she placed seventeenth.

=== 2019–2020 season ===
Feigin started the season by competing on the 2019–20 ISU Junior Grand Prix, finishing eleventh at 2019 JGP United States. She would go on to win medals in several minor senior international events, including bronze at the 2019 Denis Ten Memorial Challenge and gold at the 2019 Denkova-Staviski Cup. She also placed fourth at the 2019 CS Nebelhorn Trophy, narrowly missing the podium. She was seventeenth at the 2020 European Championships. She had been assigned to compete at the World Championships in Montreal, but those were cancelled as a result of the coronavirus pandemic.

=== 2020–2021 season ===
With the pandemic continuing to limit international travel, Feigin competed at a European-only 2020 CS Budapest Trophy, winning the bronze medal, her first on the Challenger series. After winning the Bulgarian national title again, she placed fourth at the 2021 Tallink Hotels Cup. Feigin placed seventeenth at the 2021 World Championships in Stockholm. This result qualified a ladies' berth for Bulgaria at the 2022 Winter Olympics.

=== 2021–2022 season: Beijing Olympics ===
In her only event of the fall season, Feigin finished in fifth at the 2021 CS Denis Ten Memorial Challenge before coming twentieth at the 2022 European Championships to start the new year.

Named to the Bulgarian team for the 2022 Winter Olympics, Feigin placed twenty-second in the short program of the women's event, qualifying for the free skate. She dropped one place in the free skate, finishing twenty-third. Feigin was twenty-eighth at the 2022 World Championships to end the season.

=== 2022–2023 season ===
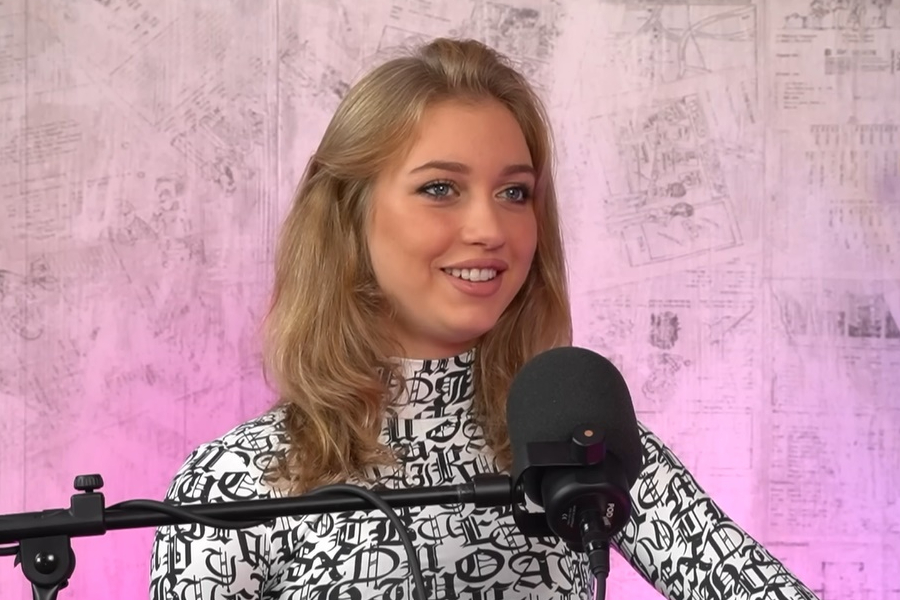
Feigin during a podcast interview in November 2022

Feigin began her season at the 2022 CS Denis Ten Memorial Challenge, coming in fourth, before winning gold at the 2022 Denkova-Staviski Cup and winning her fifth Bulgarian national title. She finished twelfth at the 2023 Winter World University Games, sixteenth at the 2023 European Championships, and twenty-fourth at the 2023 World Championships.

=== 2023–2024 season ===
Feigin started her season by competing at the 2023 Trophée Métropole Nice Côte d'Azur and the 2023 Denkova-Staviski Cup, winning bronze and gold, respectively. She then went on to finish sixth at the 2023 Tallinn Trophy.

In December, Feigin won her sixth national title at the 2024 Bulgarian Championships. Selected to compete at the 2024 European Championships in Kaunas, Lithuania, Feigin finished eighteenth. Two months later, Feigin went on to win the silver medal at the 2024 Sonia Henie Trophy.

At the 2024 World Championships in Montreal, Quebec, Feigin placed twenty-sixth in the short program, failing to advance to the free skate segment.

=== 2024–2025 season ===
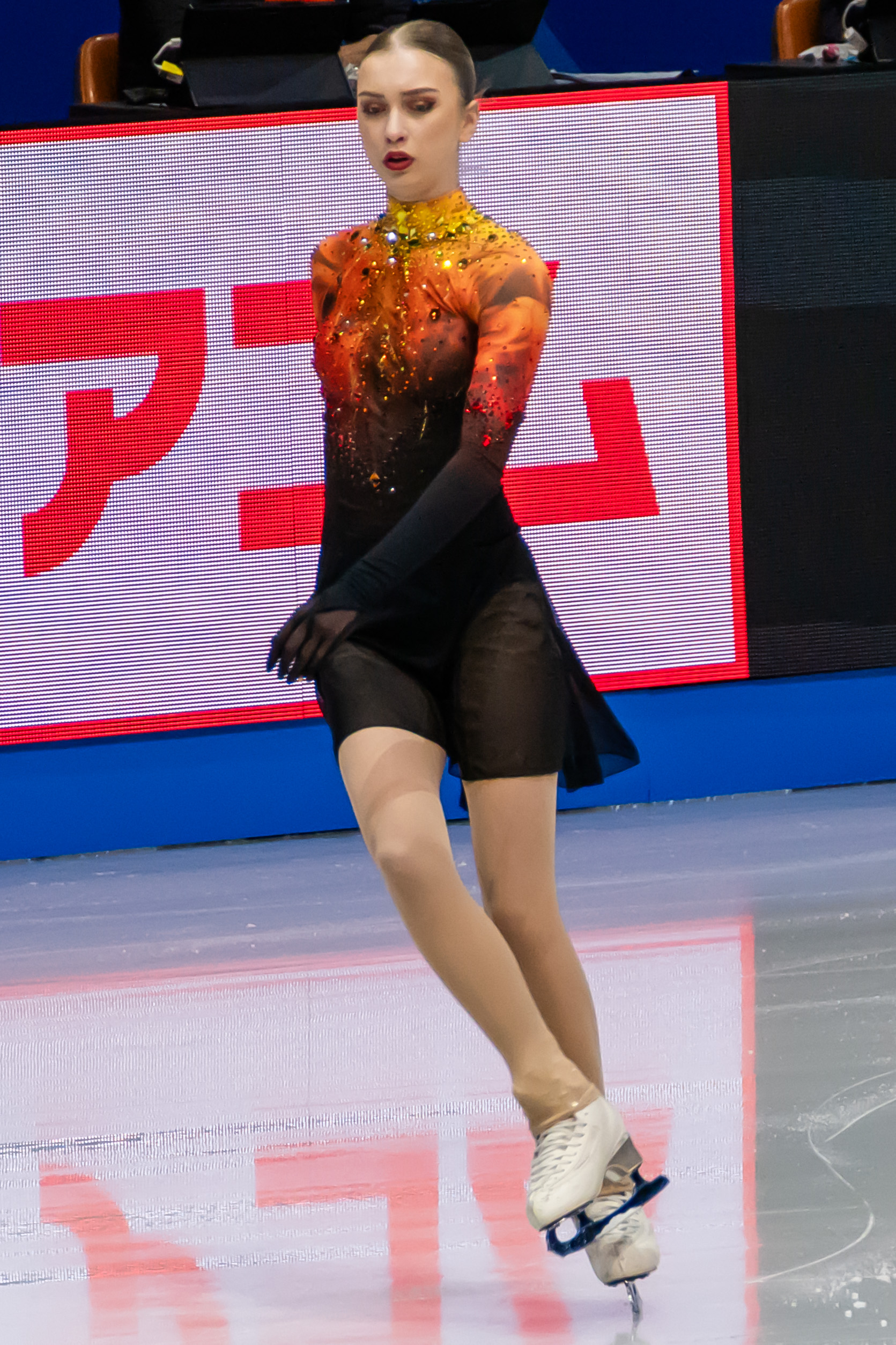
Feigin performing her short program at the 2025 World Championships

Feigin began her season by competing on the 2024–25 ISU Challenger Series, finishing sixth at the 2024 Denis Ten Memorial Challenge and at the 2024 Trophée Métropole Nice Côte d'Azur. She then went on to win silver at the 2024 Denkova-Staviski Cup and gold at the 2024 Bosphorus Cup.

In late December, she won her seventh national title at the 2025 Bulgarian Championships before also winning gold at the 2025 Sofia Trophy.

Selected to compete at the 2025 European Championships in Tallinn, Estonia, Feigin placed fourteenth in the short program, twelfth in the free skate, and fourteenth overall.

In February, Feigin competed at the Road to 26 Trophy, a test event for the 2026 Winter Olympics, where she finished in seventh place. She subsequently went on to place fourth at the 2025 Sonja Henie Trophy.

She closed the season by competing at the 2025 World Championships, held in Boston, Massachusetts, United States, in March. She finished in twenty-first place, and her placement won a quota for Bulgaria at the upcoming 2026 Winter Olympics.

In April, it was announced that she would be performing in an on-ice production of Romeo and Juliet in Plovdiv.

=== 2025–2026 season: Milano Cortina Olympics ===
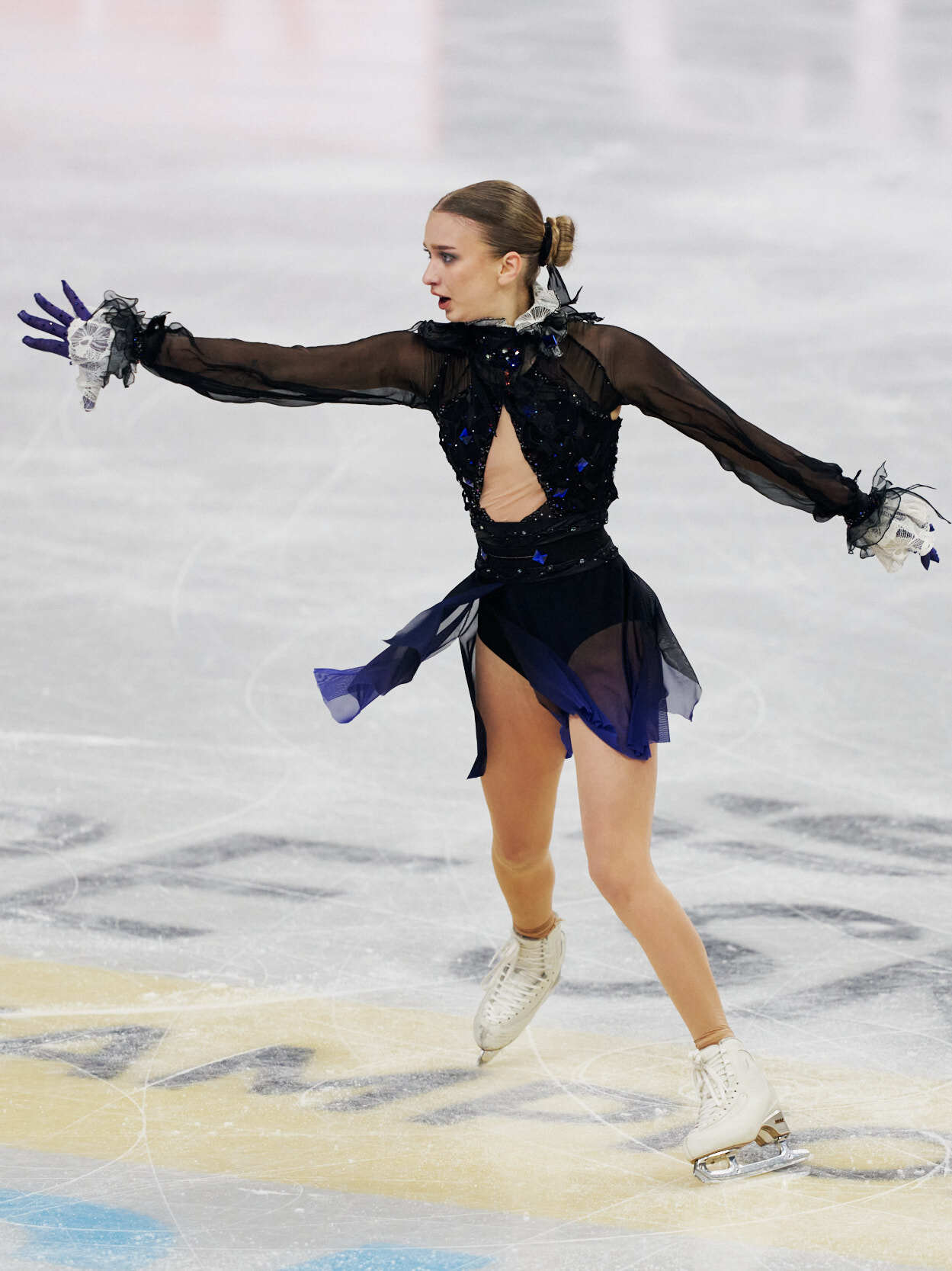
Fegin performing her short program at the 2026 World Figure Skating Championships

Feigin opened her season by winning bronze at the 2025 Trophée Métropole Nice Côte d'Azur. She followed this up by winning silver at the 2025 Denkova-Staviski Cup and finishing twentieth at the 2025 CS Golden Spin of Zagreb. A couple weeks following the latter event, Feigin won her sixth national title at the 2026 Bulgarian Championships.

In January, she placed twenty-fifth in the short program at the 2026 European Championships and did not advance to the free skate segment. A couple weeks later, it was announced that Feigin alongside biathlete, Vladimir Iliev, had been selected to act as Bulgaria's flag bearers during the 2026 Winter Olympic opening ceremony.

At the Olympic Games, Feigin finished in twenty-eighth place in the short program segment, failing to advance to the free skate.

A month later, she competed at the 2026 World Championships in Prague, placing twenty-third overall. She set season's best scores in the short program as well as the free skate, hence also setting a season's best overall score.

== Programs ==
| Season | Short program | Free skating | Exhibition |
|---|---|---|---|
| 2026–2027 | Theme from Schindler's List by John Williams; Forgive Me by Ashram choreo. by Kirill Khaliavin, Nikita Mikhailov; The Feeling Begins (from The Last Temptation of Christ) by Peter Gabriel choreo. by Benoît Richaud | Last Glimmer; Fireflies (from "Black Widow") by Lorne Balfe; Smells Like Teen Spirit by Think Up Anger feat. Malia J, Kurt Cobain | |
| 2025–26 | Theme from Schindler's List by John Williams; Forgive Me by Ashram choreo. by Kirill Khaliavin, Nikita Mikhailov; The Feeling Begins (from The Last Temptation of Christ) by Peter Gabriel choreo. by Benoît Richaud | Melting Waltz; Demimonde (from Penny Dreadful) by Abel Korzeniowski; Shout by Tears for Fears choreo. by Benoît Richaud | |
| 2024–25 | Light of the Seven (from Game of Thrones) by Ramin Djawadi arranged by Cédric Tour choreo. by Benoît Richaud | Because; Get Back; Come Together by The Beatles; Eleanor Rigby by The Beatles performed by Cody Fry, Gary Fry, John Lennon, & Paul McCartney choreo. by Benoît Richaud | |
| 2023–24 | Suite (from Modigliani) by Guy Farley; Cernunnos by Power-Haus, Christian Reindl, and Lucie Paradis choreo. by Nikita Mikhailov | Anna Karenina; Beyond The Stage; Too Late; Overture by Dario Marianelli choreo. by Ina Lutay; You Are So Beautiful by Billy Preston and Bruce Fisher performed by Tommee Profitt; The North Album by Power-Haus, Christian Reindl, and Lucie Paradis choreo. by Ina Lutay | |
| 2022–23 | Onegin's Theme (from Onegin) by Magnus Fiennes; Prodigy by Kotaro Nakagawa choreo. by Nikita Mikhailkov | Money Heist; My Life Is Going On by Cecilia Krull; Berlin by Young DiCaprio; Faithful Fate by Brand X Music; Ti amo by Umberto Tozzi performed by Laura Branigan choreo. by Albena Denkova, Maxim Staviski | |
| 2021–22 | Terry's Theme (from Limelight) by Charlie Chaplin | Supplication of the Firebird (from The Firebird) by Igor Stravinsky | |
| 2020–21 | Schindler's List by John Williams; Horizons by Ashram | Moonlight by Jennifer Thomas, Viktoria Tocca; Moonlight Sonata by Ludwig van Beethoven | |
| 2019–20 | Schindler's List by John Williams; Horizons by Ashram | The Grand Budapest Hotel by Alexandre Desplat; Passagers by The 7 Fingers (Les 7 Doigts) | |
| 2018–19 | Minnie the Moocher by Cab Calloway; Jailhouse Rock by Elvis Presley; Schindler's List; Horizons | The Nutcracker by Pyotr Ilyich Tchaikovsky | |
| 2017–18 | Minnie the Moocher by Cab Calloway; Jailhouse Rock by Elvis Presley | Alice Through the Looking Glass by Danny Elfman; Just Like Fire by Pink | Polka by Stefan Valdobrev |
| 2016–17 | La cumparsita performed by Milva | Alice Through the Looking Glass by Danny Elfman | |

== Competitive highlights ==
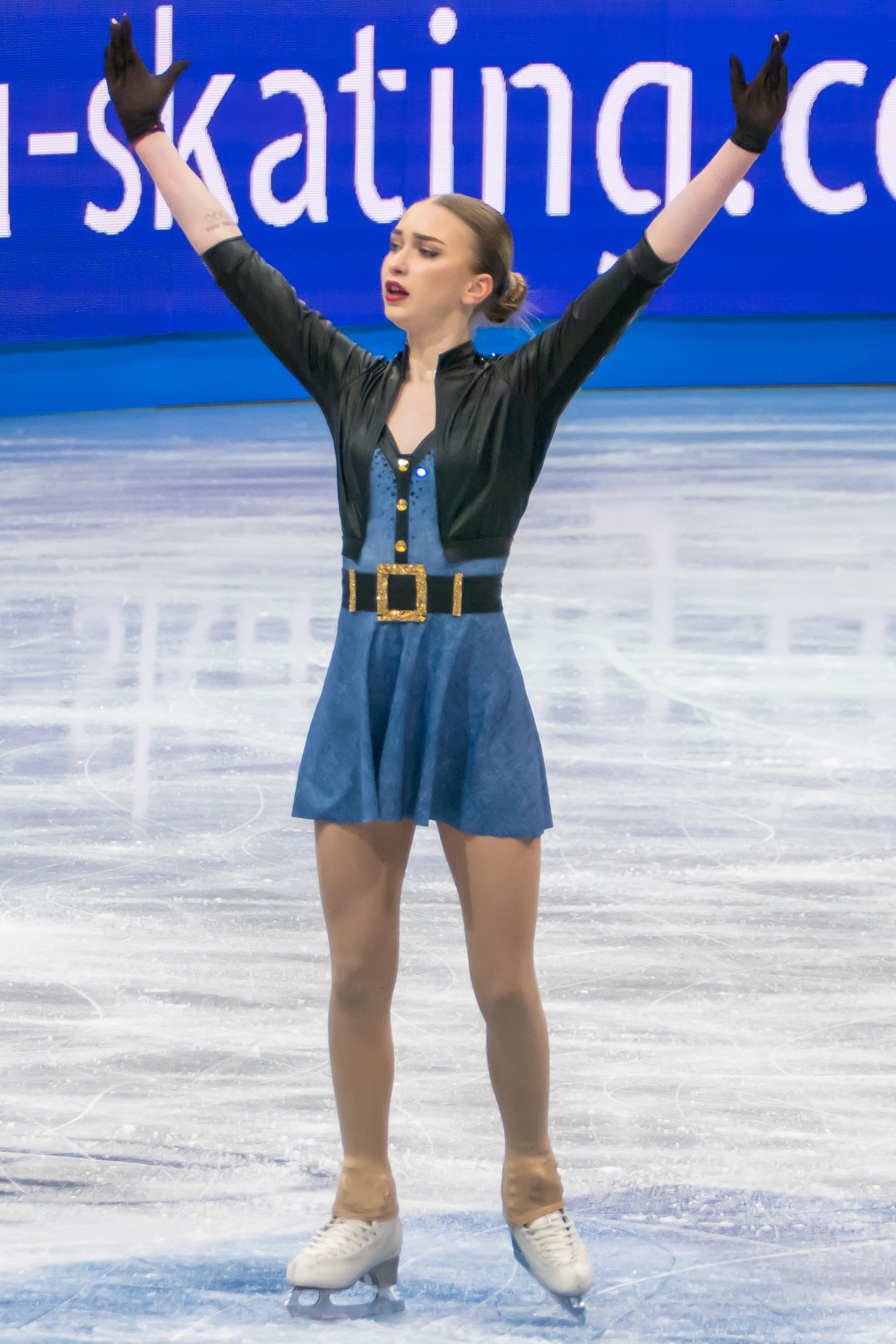
Feigin following her free skate at the 2025 World Championships

- GP – Event of the ISU Grand Prix Series
- JGP – Event of the ISU Junior Grand Prix Series
- CS – Event of the ISU Challenger Series
- TBD – Assigned
- WD – Withdrew from competition
- C – Event was cancelled

Competition placements at senior level
| Season | 2016–17 | 2018–19 | 2019–20 | 2020–21 | 2021–22 | 2022–23 | 2023–24 | 2024–25 | 2025–26 | 2026–27 |
|---|---|---|---|---|---|---|---|---|---|---|
| Winter Olympics | | | | | 23rd | | | | 28th | |
| World Championships | | 17th | C | 17th | 28th | 24th | 26th | 21st | 23rd | |
| European Championships | | 11th | 17th | | 19th | 16th | 18th | 14th | 25th | |
| Bulgarian Championships | 1st | 1st | 1st | C | | 1st | 1st | 1st | 1st | |
| CS Budapest Trophy | | | | 3rd | | | | | | 26th |
| CS Denis Ten Memorial | | | 3rd | | 5th | 4th | | 6th | | |
| CS Golden Spin of Zagreb | | | | | | | | | 20th | |
| CS Nebelhorn Trophy | | | 4th | | | | | | | |
| CS Trophée Métropole Nice | | | | | | | | 6th | | |
| Bosphorus Cup | | | | | | | | 1st | | |
| Crystal Skate of Romania | | 1st | | | | | | | | |
| Denkova-Staviski Cup | | 1st | 1st | | | 1st | 1st | 2nd | 2nd | 3rd |
| EduSport Trophy | | | 2nd | | | | | | | |
| Road to 26 Trophy | | | | | | | | 7th | | |
| Skate Victoria | | 2nd | | | | | | | | |
| Sofia Trophy | | 1st | 1st | 2nd | 2nd | 1st | | 1st | | |
| Sonja Henje Trophy | | | | | | | 2nd | 4th | | |
| Tallink Hotels Cup | | | | 4th | | | | | | |
| Tallinn Trophy | | | | | | | 6th | | | |
| Tayside Trophy | | | | | 2nd | | | | | |
| Trophée Métropole Nice | | | | | | | 3rd | | 3rd | |
| World University Games | | | | | | 12th | | | | |

Competition placements at junior level
| Season | 2014–15 | 2015–16 | 2016–17 | 2017–18 | 2018–19 | 2019–20 |
|---|---|---|---|---|---|---|
| World Junior Championships | | | 25th | 15th | 22nd | |
| Bulgarian Championships | 1st | 1st | | 1st | | |
| JGP Belarus | | | | 13th | | |
| JGP Canada | | | | | 8th | |
| JGP Czech Republic | | | 15th | | | |
| JGP Italy | | | | 15th | | |
| JGP Slovakia | | | | | 11th | |
| JGP Slovenia | | | 9th | | | |
| JGP United States | | | | | | 11th |
| Balkan Games | | | | 1st | | |
| Black Sea Ice Cup | | | | | | 1st |
| Denkova-Staviski Cup | | | 1st | 1st | | |
| NRW Trophy | | | 9th | | 1st | |
| Open Ice Mall Cup | | | | 1st | | |
| Skate Helena | | | 1st | | | |
| Sofia Trophy | | | 2nd | 1st | | |
| Volvo Open Cup | | | 4th | | | |

== Detailed results ==
ISU personal best scores in the +5/-5 GOE System
| Segment | Type | Score | Event |
|---|---|---|---|
| Total | TSS | 177.37 | 2019 CS Nebelhorn Trophy |
| Short program | TSS | 60.90 | 2020 CS Budapest Trophy |
| Short program | TES | 34.38 | 2020 CS Budapest Trophy |
| Short program | PCS | 26.80 | 2019 CS Nebelhorn Trophy |
| Free skating | TSS | 116.62 | 2019 CS Nebelhorn Trophy |
| Free skating | TES | 62.35 | 2019 World Championships |
| Free skating | PCS | 55.04 | 2019 CS Nebelhorn Trophy |

ISU personal best scores in the +3/-3 GOE System
| Segment | Type | Score | Event |
|---|---|---|---|
| Total | TSS | 147.50 | 2018 World Junior Championships |
| Short program | TSS | 51.49 | 2018 World Junior Championships |
| Short program | TES | 31.28 | 2018 World Junior Championships |
| Short program | PCS | 20.21 | 2018 World Junior Championships |
| Free skating | TSS | 96.01 | 2018 World Junior Championships |
| Free skating | TES | 54.68 | 2016 JGP Slovenia |
| Free skating | PCS | 42.89 | 2018 World Junior Championships |

=== Senior level ===
Results in the 2020–21 season
| Date | Event | SP | | FS | | Total | |
| Date | Event | P | Score | P | Score | P | Score |
|---|---|---|---|---|---|---|---|
| 15–17 Oct 2020 | (Hungary) 2020 CS Budapest Trophy | 3 | 60.90 | 3 | 111.78 | 3 | 172.68 |
| 19–21 Feb 2021 | (Estonia) 2021 Tallink Hotels Cup | 4 | 55.94 | 2 | 106.31 | 4 | 162.25 |
| 26 Feb – 3 Mar 2021 | (Bulgaria) 2021 Sofia Trophy | 2 | 60.24 | 2 | 121.51 | 2 | 181.75 |
| 22–28 Mar 2021 | (Sweden) 2021 World Championships | 17 | 59.97 | 18 | 113.55 | 17 | 173.52 |

Results in the 2021–22 season
| Date | Event | SP | | FS | | Total | |
| Date | Event | P | Score | P | Score | P | Score |
|---|---|---|---|---|---|---|---|
| 28–31 Oct 2021 | (Kazakhstan) 2021 CS Denis Ten Memorial Challenge | 5 | 51.98 | 5 | 94.54 | 5 | 146.52 |
| 6–7 Nov 2021 | (United Kingdom) 2021 Tayside Trophy | 2 | 58.74 | 3 | 100.67 | 2 | 159.41 |
| 10–16 Jan 2022 | (Estonia) 2022 European Championships | 20 | 56.78 | 20 | 98.78 | 20 | 155.56 |
| 1–6 Feb 2022 | (Bulgaria) 2022 Sofia Trophy | 2 | 55.21 | 2 | 109.74 | 2 | 164.95 |
| 15–17 Feb 2022 | (China) 2022 Winter Olympics | 22 | 59.16 | 23 | 100.15 | 23 | 159.31 |
| 21–27 Mar 2022 | (France) 2022 World Championships | 28 | 55.01 | —N/a | —N/a | 28 | 55.01 |

Results in the 2022–23 season
| Date | Event | SP | | FS | | Total | |
| Date | Event | P | Score | P | Score | P | Score |
|---|---|---|---|---|---|---|---|
| 26–29 Oct 2022 | (Kazakhstan) 2022 CS Denis Ten Memorial Challenge | 2 | 50.11 | 4 | 90.85 | 4 | 140.96 |
| 1–6 Nov 2022 | (Bulgaria) 2022 Denkova-Staviski Cup | 1 | 58.28 | 2 | 99.48 | 1 | 157.76 |
| 15–18 Dec 2022 | (Bulgaria) 2022 Bulgarian Championships | 1 | 57.38 | 2 | 105.19 | 1 | 162.57 |
| 13–15 Jan 2023 | (United States) 2023 Winter World University Games | 8 | 58.34 | 15 | 88.94 | 12 | 147.28 |
| 25–29 Jan 2023 | (Finland) 2023 European Championships | 17 | 54.31 | 14 | 100.92 | 16 | 155.23 |
| 3–7 Feb 2023 | (Bulgaria) 2023 Sofia Trophy | 1 | 58.89 | 1 | 106.89 | 1 | 165.78 |
| 22–26 Mar 2023 | (Japan) 2023 World Championships | 24 | 54.65 | 23 | 101.09 | 24 | 155.74 |

Results in the 2023–24 season
| Date | Event | SP | | FS | | Total | |
| Date | Event | P | Score | P | Score | P | Score |
|---|---|---|---|---|---|---|---|
| 18–22 Oct 2023 | (France) 2023 Trophée Métropole Nice Côte d'Azur | 2 | 57.41 | 7 | 96.60 | 3 | 154.01 |
| 7–12 Nov 2023 | (Bulgaria) 2023 Denkova-Staviski Cup | 1 | 62.22 | 1 | 113.84 | 1 | 176.06 |
| 21–24 Nov 2023 | (Estonia) 2023 Tallinn Trophy | 6 | 51.59 | 7 | 85.94 | 6 | 137.53 |
| 14–17 Dec 2023 | (Bulgaria) 2023 Bulgarian Championships | 2 | 62.58 | 1 | 99.90 | 1 | 162.48 |
| 10–14 Jan 2024 | (Lithuania) 2024 European Championships | 12 | 57.33 | 19 | 95.71 | 18 | 153.04 |
| 8–10 Mar 2024 | (Norway) 2024 Sonia Henje Trophy | 2 | 55.01 | 2 | 105.22 | 2 | 160.23 |
| 18–24 Mar 2024 | (Canada) 2024 World Championships | 26 | 53.33 | —N/a | —N/a | 26 | 53.33 |

Results in the 2024–25 season
| Date | Event | SP | | FS | | Total | |
| Date | Event | P | Score | P | Score | P | Score |
|---|---|---|---|---|---|---|---|
| 3–6 Oct 2024 | (Kazakhstan) 2024 CS Denis Ten Memorial Challenge | 5 | 59.73 | 6 | 108.60 | 6 | 168.33 |
| 16–20 Oct 2024 | (France) 2024 CS Trophée Métropole Nice Côte d'Azur | 5 | 56.26 | 10 | 101.21 | 6 | 157.47 |
| 5–10 Nov 2024 | (Bulgaria) 2024 Denkova-Staviski Cup | 1 | 66.30 | 2 | 110.96 | 2 | 177.26 |
| 25 Nov – 1 Dec 2024 | (Turkey) 2024 Bosphorus Cup | 1 | 58.02 | 1 | 109.30 | 1 | 167.32 |
| 19–22 Dec 2024 | (Bulgaria) 2024 Bulgarian Championships | 1 | 62.47 | 1 | 127.38 | 1 | 189.85 |
| 7–12 Jan 2025 | (Bulgaria) 2025 Sofia Trophy | 1 | 65.83 | 1 | 126.11 | 1 | 191.94 |
| 28 Jan – 2 Feb 2025 | (Estonia) 2025 European Championships | 14 | 53.32 | 12 | 105.94 | 14 | 159.26 |
| 18–20 Feb 2025 | (Italy) 2025 Road to 26 Trophy | 7 | 53.36 | 8 | 103.28 | 7 | 156.64 |
| 6–9 Mar 2024 | (Norway) 2025 Sonia Henje Trophy | 5 | 53.27 | 3 | 106.44 | 4 | 159.71 |
| 25–30 Mar 2025 | (United States) 2025 World Championships | 18 | 57.22 | 21 | 101.33 | 21 | 158.55 |

Results in the 2025–26 season
| Date | Event | SP | | FS | | Total | |
| Date | Event | P | Score | P | Score | P | Score |
|---|---|---|---|---|---|---|---|
| 1–5 Oct 2025 | (France) 2025 Trophée Métropole Nice Côte d'Azur | 4 | 48.01 | 3 | 94.22 | 3 | 142.23 |
| 7–9 Nov 2025 | (Bulgaria) 2025 Denkova-Staviski Cup | 1 | 57.54 | 2 | 101.67 | 2 | 159.21 |
| 3–6 Dec 2025 | (Croatia) 2025 CS Golden Spin of Zagreb | 26 | 41.78 | 16 | 90.57 | 20 | 132.35 |
| 18–21 Dec 2025 | (Bulgaria) 2025 Bulgarian Championships | 1 | 57.36 | 1 | 112.89 | 1 | 170.25 |
| 13–18 Jan 2026 | (United Kingdom) 2026 European Championships | 25 | 49.70 | —N/a | —N/a | 25 | 49.70 |
| 17–19 Feb 2026 | (Italy) 2026 Winter Olympics | 28 | 53.42 | —N/a | —N/a | 28 | 53.42 |
| 24–29 Mar 2026 | (Czech Republic) 2026 World Championships | 20 | 58.10 | 23 | 97.31 | 23 | 155.36 |

Results in the 2026–27 season
| Date | Event | SP | | FS | | Total | |
| Date | Event | P | Score | P | Score | P | Score |
|---|---|---|---|---|---|---|---|
| Oct 15–18, 2026 | (Hungary) 2026 CS Budapest Trophy | 19 | 51.42 | 28 | 78.64 | 26 | 130.06 |
| Nov 6–8, 2026 | (Bulgaria) 2026 Denkova-Staviski Cup | 2 | 59.47 | 3 | 114.16 | 3 | 173.63 |

2019–2020 season
| Date | Event | SP | FS | Total |
| 12–16 February 2020 | 2020 Sofia Trophy | 1; 64.56 | 1; 130.46 | 1; 195.02 |
| 20–26 January 2020 | 2020 European Championships | 18; 53.87 | 16; 100.56 | 17; 154.43 |
| 8–12 January 2020 | 2020 EduSport Trophy | 3; 61.67 | 2; 117.31 | 2; 178.98 |
| 29 November – 1 December 2019 | 2019 Bulgarian Championships | 1; 65.70 | 1; 119.78 | 1; 185.48 |
| 12–17 November 2019 | 2019 Denkova-Staviski Cup | 1; 65.50 | 1; 126.76 | 1; 192.26 |
| 9–12 October 2019 | 2019 Denis Ten MC | 3; 57.55 | 2; 113.54 | 3; 171.09 |
| 25–28 September 2019 | 2019 CS Nebelhorn Trophy | 4; 60.75 | 3; 116.62 | 4; 177.37 |
2018–2019 season
| Date | Event | SP | FS | Total |
| 18-24 March 2019 | 2019 World Championships | 20; 56.69 | 16; 108.62 | 17; 165.31 |
| 5-10 February 2019 | 2019 Sofia Trophy | 1; 65.26 | 1; 128.14 | 1; 193.30 |
| 21-27 January 2019 | 2019 European Championships | 9; 58.80 | 11; 105.40 | 11; 164.20 |
| 27 November - 1 December 2018 | 2018 Denkova-Staviski Cup | 1; 61.04 | 1; 118.45 | 1; 179.40 |
| 16-18 November 2018 | 2018 Bulgarian Championships | 1; 59.45 | 1; 105.79 | 1; 165.24 |
| 24-28 October 2018 | 2018 Crystal Skate | 1; 55.18 | 1; 100.81 | 1; 155.99 |
2016–2017 season
| Date | Event | SP | FS | Total |
| 16-18 December 2016 | 2016 Bulgarian Championships | 1; 57.95 | 1; 87.13 | 1; 145.08 |

=== Junior results ===
2019–2020 season
| Date | Event | SP | FS | Total |
| 19-22 September 2019 | 2019 Black Sea IG | 1; 57.03 | 1; 111.47 | 1; 168.50 |
| 28-31 August 2019 | 2019 JGP United States | 15; 47.21 | 9; 87.14 | 11; 134.35 |
2018–2019 season
| Date | Event | SP | FS | Total |
| 4-10 March 2019 | 2019 World Junior Championships | 21; 48.45 | 21; 87.24 | 22; 135.69 |
| 12-15 September 2018 | 2018 JGP Canada | 6; 56.83 | 9; 90.70 | 8; 147.53 |
| 22-25 August 2018 | 2018 JGP Slovakia | 17; 44.94 | 11; 87.07 | 11; 132.01 |
| 10-12 August 2018 | 2018 NRW Trophy | 1; 49.45 | 2; 90.96 | 1; 140.41 |
2017–2018 season
| Date | Event | SP | FS | Total |
| 29-30 March 2018 | 2018 Balkan Games | 1; 45.76 | 1; 98.30 | 1; 144.06 |
| 24-17 March 2018 | 2018 Coppa Europa | 1; 54.78 | 1; 101.31 | 1; 156.09 |
| 5-11 March 2018 | 2018 World Junior Championships | 17; 51.49 | 15; 96.01 | 15; 147.50 |
| 6-11 February 2018 | 2018 Sofia Trophy | 1; 56.22 | 1; 105.24 | 1; 161.46 |
| 30 January - 2 February 2018 | 2018 Open Ice Mall Cup | 1; 49.34 | 1; 101.84 | 1; 151.18 |
| 19-21 December 2017 | 2017 Bulgarian Championships | 1; 55.53 | 1; 101.87 | 1; 157.40 |
| 30 October - 4 November 2017 | 2017 Denkova-Staviski Cup | 1; 55.52 | 1; 98.83 | 1; 154.35 |
| 11-14 October 2017 | 2017 JGP Italy | 15; 44.54 | 19; 72.74 | 15; 117.28 |
| 20-23 September 2017 | 2017 JGP Belarus | 18; 39.30 | 11; 84.42 | 13; 124.32 |
2016–2017 season
| Date | Event | SP | FS | Total |
| 30 March - 2 April 2017 | 2017 Coppa Europa | 1; 49.12 | 1; 84.71 | 1; 133.83 |
| 13-19 March 2017 | 2017 World Junior Championships | 25; 44.45 | - | 25; 44.45 |
| 8-12 February 2017 | 2017 Sofia Trophy | 2; 54.23 | 2; 98.63 | 2; 152.86 |
| 20-21 January 2017 | 2017 Skate Helena | 1; 54.31 | 2; 82.01 | 1; 136.32 |
| 30 November - 4 December 2016 | 2016 NRW Trophy | 9; 44.37 | 10; 79.93 | 9; 124.30 |
| 9-13 November 2016 | 2016 Volvo Open Cup | 4; 48.85 | 3; 94.99 | 4; 143.84 |
| 18-23 October 2016 | 2016 Denkova-Staviski Cup | 1; 57.38 | 1; 97.20 | 1; 154.58 |
| 21-24 September 2016 | 2016 JGP Slovenia | 11; 48.43 | 7; 92.87 | 9; 141.30 |
| 31 August - 3 September 2016 | 2016 JGP Czech Republic | 22; 33.31 | 11; 80.34 | 15; 113.65 |

Olympic Games
| Preceded by Maria Zdravkova and Radoslav Yankov | Flagbearer for Bulgaria (with Vladimir Iliev); Milano Cortina 2026 | Succeeded by |
