= Stefan Valdobrev =

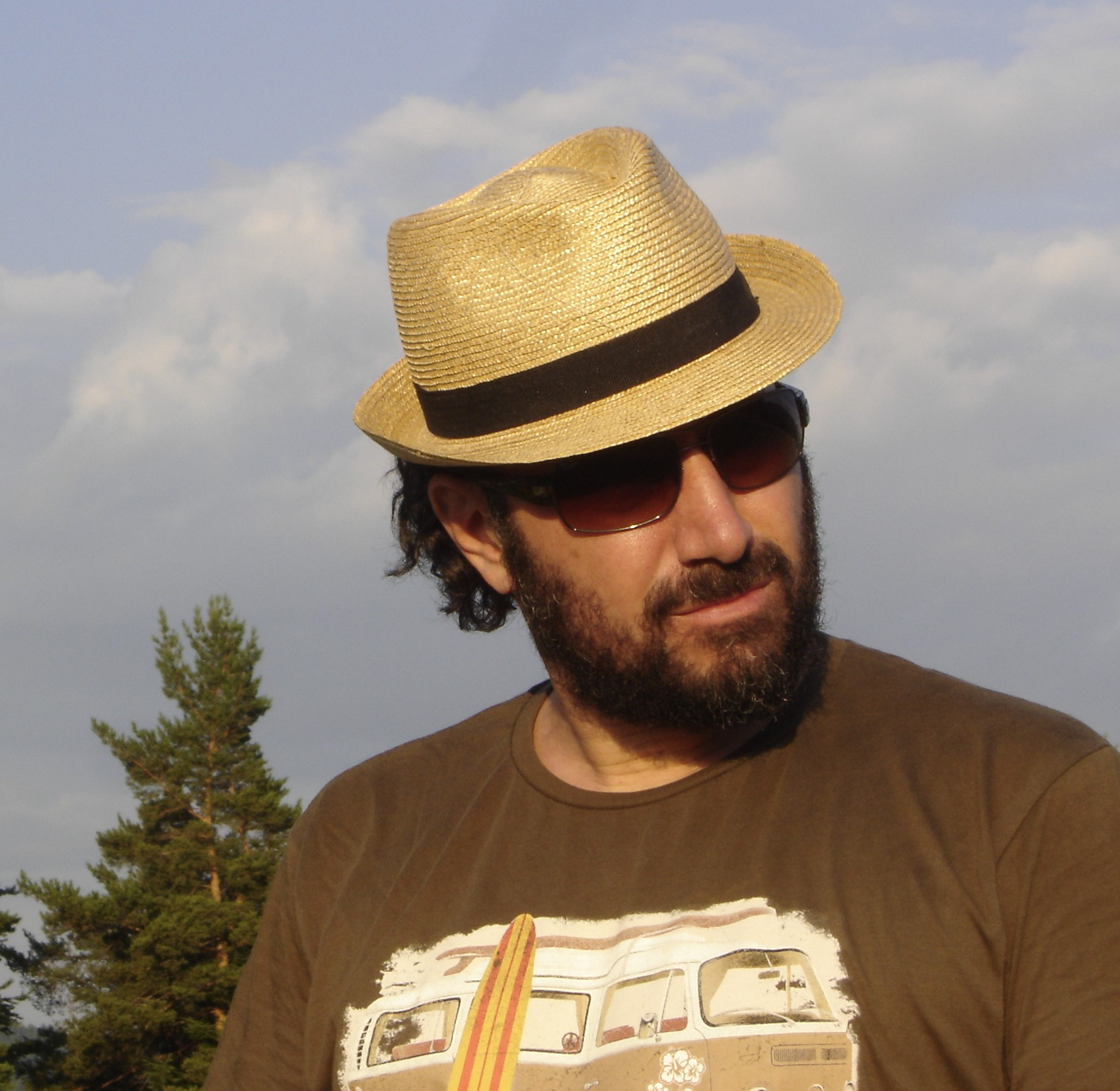

Background information
- Born: Stefan Kostadinov Valdobrev; 20 May 1970 (age 56); Stara Zagora, PR Bulgaria
- Occupations: Actor, composer, musician, filmmaker
- Years active: 1991–present

Stefan Kostadinov Valdobrev (Bulgarian: Стефан Костадинов Вълдобрев; born 20 May 1970) is a Bulgarian actor, film and theatre composer, singer-songwriter and filmmaker. He received classical training at the National Academy of Theatre and Film Arts in Sofia.

Valdobrev rose to prominence in the early 1990s, mainly with his hit songs, which made him extremely popular and gained him idol status in the Bulgarian music scene, twice being awarded as best male artist at the National Music Television ceremonies. Despite that he never quit his acting career and took part in numerous performances which have spanned a wide variety of genres from classical to contemporary drama, and from popular comedies to alternative, non-commercial projects, all staged by the most prominent Bulgarian directors on the most significant theatre stages. At that time Valdobrev gradually entered the world of film and theatre music and since 1992 has gone on to enjoy composing the original scores for more than 70 stage performances and 20 feature and documentary movies, winning many plaudits and awards for his work. In 2000 he received the Golden Rose film award for debut for the Dog's Home original movie soundtrack featuring Arabel Karajan. In 2008 he composed the music for Stefan Komandarev's highly acclaimed film The World is Big and Salvation Lurks Around the Corner, a Bulgarian-German co-production with Miki Manojlovic in the lead role, which won a considerable number of international awards and reached the Short List of The Academy Awards 2010 for Foreign Language film.

Although Valdobrev continued performing in theatre (Shakespeare's Much Ado About Nothing, Dostoyevsky's The Brothers Karamazov, Bulgakov's The Master and Margarita, Muller's Hamletmachine, Anouilh's Eurydice), he gradually moved away from this area, and also from the music stage, to become more established as a film actor. In 2004 he got his break in Burning out, for which he received the Golden Rose for Best Male performance at the National Film Awards.

In 2006-2007 Valdobrev completed a film directing specialization at the Academy of Performing Arts in Prague (FAMU). After graduating from there he directed a few short films, TV programs and music videos. He made his director's film debut in 2010 with the documentary comedy drama My Mate Manchester United. Provided with the cameo appearance of the Bulgarian football superstar Dimitar Berbatov, the film won two international awards and was presented in the competition of the official selection of 21 major world film festivals: IDFA Amsterdam, HotDocs Toronto, ZagrebDox, Sarajevo and Warsaw among them.

After being away from the rock stage for almost a decade in 2012 Stefan Valdobrev decided to rejoin his old band "The Usual Suspects" and to start recording songs and performing live in concerts again.

== Early life ==
Stefan Valdobrev was born in Stara Zagora, Bulgaria, the son of Maria Valdobreva (née Atanassova) and Kostadin Valdobrev, both civil engineers. His mother was descended from Macedonian refugees who settled in the Rhodope Mountains, and his paternal ancestors come from midst of the country, where the Thracian valley meets with the Central Balkan region. Valdobrev has a sister, Iva (born 1965).

Not that he was a bad student, but he found early on that he would rather immerse himself in arts or football than attend to his studies. According to his own account: "The good old socialist block of flats I lived in was in the middle of a magical Bermuda triangle in which I got lost – the stadium, the cinema and the circus. I spent all my time there – playing with a ball, wandering with my friends, sneaking into the ballerinas' trailers, acting scenes from films I'd just watched, so I often forgot to go home until late at night. The school was something in between, but never became a part of this triangle".

He played the piano for quite a long time, but then decided to quit and take up the guitar. He started to take an interest in the theatre and joined a local amateur company at the town's chitalishte – a common Bulgarian Art House, where a variety of different arts could be trained and practiced. Very soon it became like a home to him: rehearsing plays on the stage, studying the guitar in the basement, reading and writing poetry in the attic, writing music for his own lyrics. It was not long before he made his acting debut as the King in Shakespeare's Love's Labour's Lost. At the age of 18 he established himself as a songwriter, performing his first solo concert. Additionally he formed a rock band called "Alleya Alya" which made several studio recording sessions, all of them now missing.

Meanwhile Valdobrev attended the High School for Foreign Languages in Stara Zagora. For a Communist country behind the Iron Curtain which Bulgaria was at that time, this school was like a breath of fresh air – with a discipline not so strict and teachers being lenient and having a personal approach to each of the students. They soon noticed Valdobrev's wandering mind and lack of concentration in class and created a system which tried to help him study the English language better. They gave him constant tasks to listen to and write down lyrics of new songs, perform them with his guitar in the lessons and translate the words for his classmates. These everyday concerts were the real productive education for him and later, when he was traveling over the Black Sea resorts and Germany as a street musician, he already had a set-list of 300 prepared and well-rehearsed world hit songs of any genre.

In 1989 Valdobrev was accepted in Sofia University to study English philology, but soon quit and attended the National Academy for Theatre and Film Arts to become part of what was later called: "the most successful acting class of the two highly praised Bulgarian professors – Krikor Azaryan and Todor Kolev". Together with his fellow actors and directors Galin Stoev, Marius Kurkinski, Kamen Donev, Stefka Yanorova, Koyna Ruseva, Kasiel Noah Asher, Lilia Maraviglia they formed the core of a New Wave in Bulgarian theatre.

== Career ==
=== Acting ===
==== Theatre ====
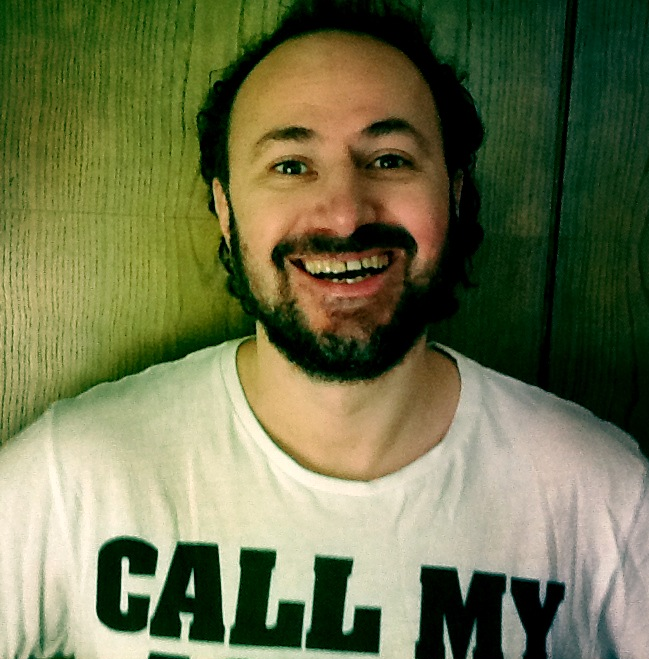
Stefan Valdobrev portraying Sart in People from Oz, 2013

Even before their graduation, Valdobrev and his friends were very active in acting or staging in professional theatres like the Academy Drama Theatre or the Youth Theatre. Such kick-start performances as Sam Shepard's Angel City, Georg Buchner's Leonce and Lena, William Shakespeare's Twelfth Night, Aeschylus' Agamemnon, Goran Stefanovski's Black Hole, Chekhov Revue and others appeared between 1991 and 1993. In June, 1993 Valdobrev became a member of the troupe of the National Theatre, but some time later he had to start serving his 12 months' mandatory military service, so eventually moved to the Bulgarian Army Theatre (actually, a civil repertory theatre sponsored by the Ministry of Defense, with a leading status in the cultural life). He spent there 10 years, taking part in many significant performances like Georg Buchner's Woyzeck, Shakespeare’s Much Ado About Nothing, Eric Bogosian's Suburbia and Jean Anouilh's Eurydice. In 1997 the independent theatre company La Strada, formed by the popular director Tedi Moskov produced three major hit performances in collaboration with the Bulgarian Army Theatre: The Master and Margarita (presented at the official selection of the Avignon Theatre Festival), Commedia del Servitore (a co-production with the Avignon Theatre Festival) and Fantasmagorii. As one of the cast Valdobrev spent the next five years touring and presenting the plays at the most prestigious European theatre festivals.

2007 marked a significant turning point in his career. After an absence from the theatre stage for a few years, Valdobrev returned as a freelance actor for a beneficial collaboration with the Paris-based Comedie-Francaise Bulgarian director Galin Stoev, who started occasionally to return home only to stage the texts of the prominent contemporary young dramatist Yana Borisova. Small Play for a Children’s Room (2008), Pleasantlyscary (2010) and People from Oz (2013) became remarkable events in the theatre life and were many times awarded for best performance, best play, or best director.

==== Film ====
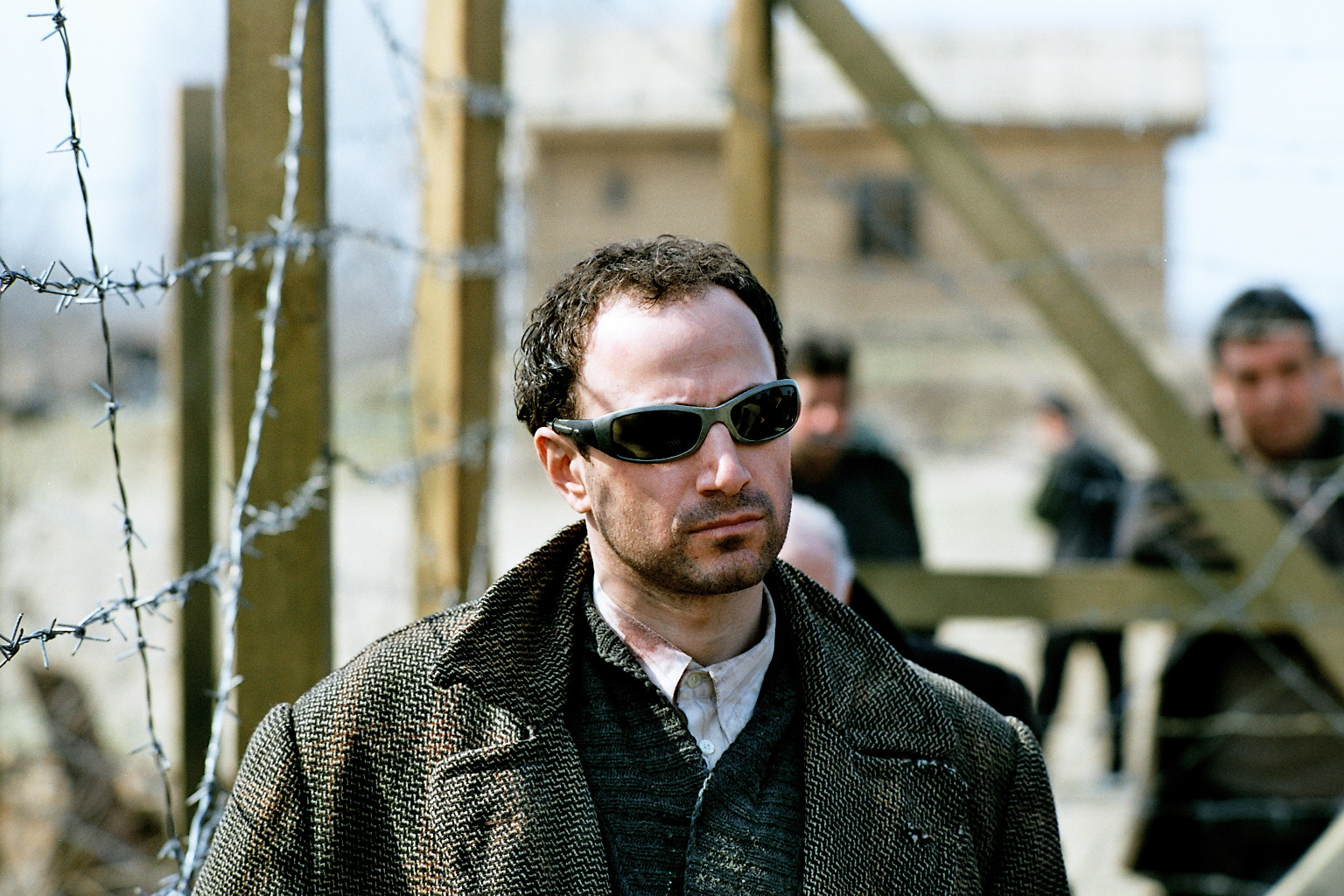
Valdobrev on the set of the film Burning Out, 2003

In the early 1990s Valdobrev made quite a few appearances on Bulgarian National Television, mainly as a participant in a students' show with a cult status named "Coo-Coo". Despite this success he subsequently decided to turn to film for more challenging roles. While struggling to establish himself in cinema, he took small parts in international co-production B movies. His onscreen career began in 2000 with the supporting role of the tricky Communist activist Popadamchev in the Bulgarian-Macedonian production Warming Up Yesterday's Lunch. The TV comedy Encounter (2003) gave him his first leading role as a clumsy journalist who falls in love with his cousin's girlfriend. 2004 was the year of his big movie break when he took on the lead in Burning Out, a love drama by director Stanimir Trifonov, set in the immediate post World War II period. Valdobrev’s performance of the romantic Italian doctor Enrico Corsa, separated from his Bulgarian wife and sent to a Communist prison camp, from which he finally escapes, has been described as fine, deep and centered , and brought him the Best Actor award at the Golden Rose National film ceremony. Valdobrev was cast as Mitko, an expert of campaigns in the team of his American colleague Tim Knight (Ross McCall) in the 2007 United States-Bulgarian political thriller Trade Routes. Taking the chance to play opposite the Italian prominent actor Sergio Castellitto, Valdobrev decided to make a cameo appearance in the 2007 TV war drama L'Aviatore, performing an Italian Jew, rescued by the Genoese skilled-pilot Massimo Teglio (Castellitto).

In 2008 he collaborated with director and friend Stefan Komandarev in his highly acclaimed film The World Is Big and Salvation Lurks Around the Corner, performing the supporting character of the Bulgarian emigrant Stoyan. The film enjoyed a rich festival career, won many nominations and awards, was released theatrically in 72 countries worldwide and reached the Short List of The Academy Awards 2010 for a Foreign Language film. That same year he starred opposite the Bulgarian born French actress Natalia Dontcheva in The Glass River, a mystery film by Stanimir Trifonov in which Valdobrev portrayed the obstinate priest Peter, a hermit who is experiencing a crisis of faith and trying to discover the secret of the Cathar-Bogomils, whilst crossing paths with an unknown visitor to his village, the French symbologist Ellen Tibaud. In 2012 Valdobrev played the lead role in the road comedy drama Migration of the Belted Bonito - a film by the Bulgarian independent and critically acclaimed film-maker Lyudmil Todorov. Valdobrev portrayed the poor and dreamy painter of Orthodox icons Simo, who, together with his close friend and neighbour, finds the most unorthodox way to make ends meet, with them both setting out on a comical journey from their modest village to the Black Sea shore. Critics praised the film as being "one of the finest comedies of the newest Bulgarian cinema".

=== Music ===
==== Film and Theatre ====
When he was still in the Academy of Theatre and Film Arts Stefan Valdobrev was assigned to compose the music for almost every one of the performances he played in. This is how he gained skills directly in practice. By the end of his acting education he had already written the scores for 10 stage performances. His work garnered attention, providing him a long list of commissions to the professional scene. He then enjoyed a long period of productive years, composing the music for more than 70 theatre plays and 20 feature and documentary films, receiving many plaudits, awards and nominations.

In 1999, Valdobrev was approached by director Stefan Komandarev to compose the music for his feature directorial debut, Dog's Home. Valdobrev composed both the film score and the words and music for six songs, performed by some of the most prominent contemporary alternative rock bands. The released Original Soundtrack was actually the first ever released Bulgarian movie soundtrack. It turned out to be a great success. The pilot single Is it me, or is it not? performed by Stefan Valdobrev and featuring his friend and colleague Arabel Karajan became one of the film songs classics. The film’s score earned Valdobrev the Golden Rose for a film debut at the 2000 National Film Awards ceremony. Two years later Komandarev and Valdobrev teamed up again in Komandarev’s second documentary film Alphabet of Hope. Their collaboration resumed with the director’s 2009 hit The World Is Big and Salvation Lurks Around the Corner, based on the best-selling novel by the German author Ilija Trojanow and featuring Miki Manojlovic in the lead role. Both the film and the soundtrack were very successful. The film received numerous international awards and nominations, reaching the Oscars' Foreign Language Films' Shortlist. During the same period Valdobrev started to span his work on mainly European projects. Since 2008 he has provided the music for fiction and documentaries like the Czech films Kulicky (2008), Killing the Czech Way (2010) and Love in the Grave (2012), the Norwegian Can You Talk? (2011) and the Slovenian State of Shock (2011). In 2013 he started to create the score for the Bulgarian National Television series The Ungiven, a somber drama that tells the story of the saving of 48,000 Bulgarian Jews in the years of the Second World War.

His musical style is difficult to catalogue. It varies greatly with the passage of time, play after play and film after film. Working in a wide field of genres, due to the requirements of the dramaturgy or the script, Valdobrev successfully switches from melancholy, delicate and deeply emotional compositions to Balkan gypsy and folk brass music, from classic orchestra scores to ethno-ambient tunes. He sometimes uses a light jazz idiom with a slight hint of the absurd and another time would use examples of circus-like dodecaphonic themes in a gently ironic way. Artistic movements like New Romanticism, Postminimalism and World music are also influential on his work. What may be regarded as a mark of his output is the very occasional use of a memorable leitmotif in each of his compositions.

Based mostly on his twelve years of classical piano and acoustic guitar lessons at school, Valdobrev followed the way to a collaboration and friendship with the most outstanding Bulgarian musicians, jazz and ethno bands, symphony orchestras and conductors. He has often stated that the lack of musical Academy training was of course a disadvantage, but this was compensated by the advantage of being an actor who composes for fellow-actors and senses their need on the stage or on the screen: "After all, if you had the right professors and they were good in a certain art (which was my case) they could teach you the rules of arts in a way to use them in another field of your muses. Because the rules of art are universal. For me there’s no difference if I play a character, compose music or write poetry for my songs, it’s all about telling stories, communication, sharing thoughts and emotions, about the ability to stretch and push the boundaries with visions of your own world".

==== Popular music ====
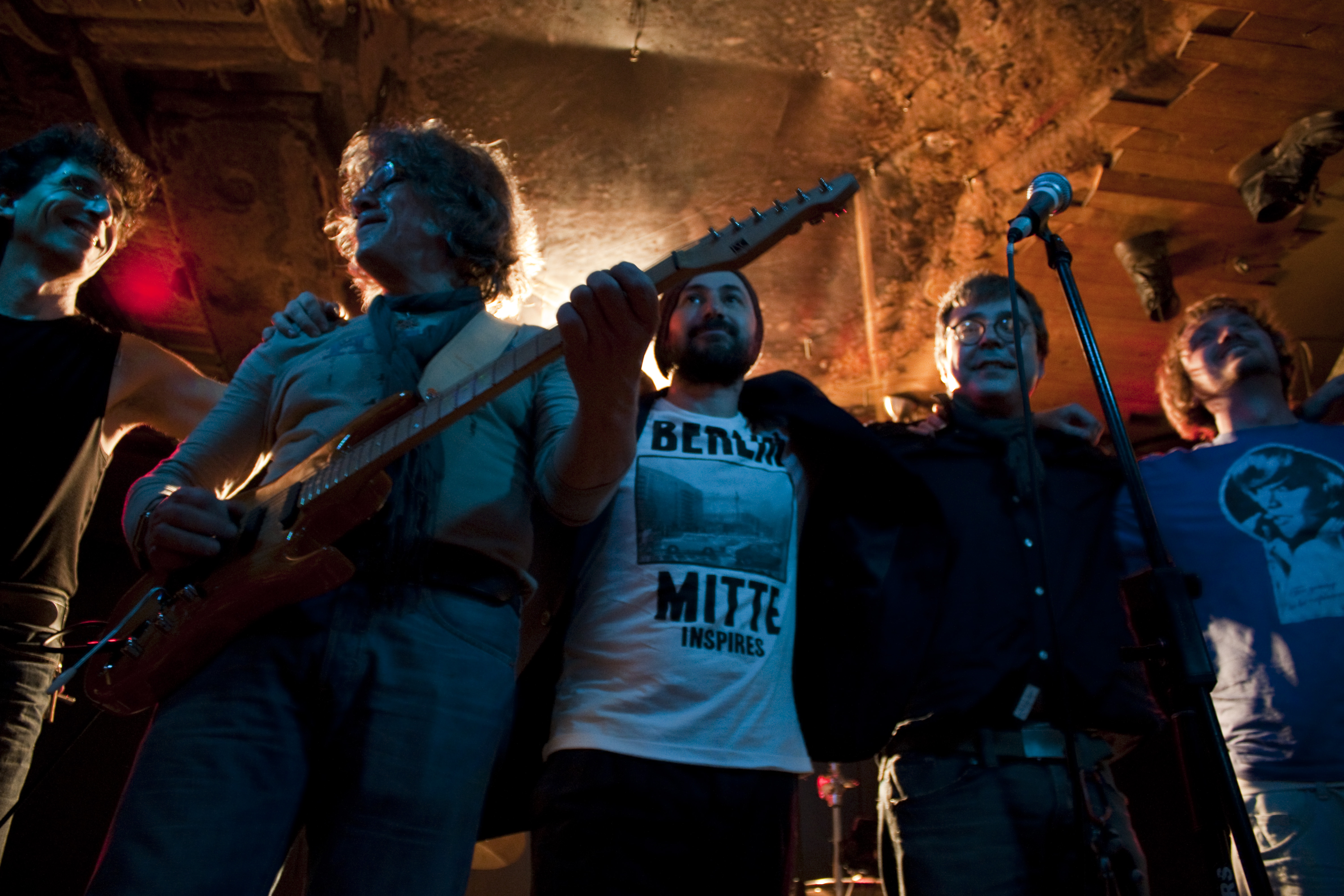
Valdobrev with his band The Usual Suspects, 2012

He began creating songs when he was 17. In the beginning it was more like putting music to his poetry and performing it with a guitar. At the age of 19 he made his first solo concert, which included 22 author songs.

Parallel to this in 1988 he formed a band, named Alleya Alya – a blend of new wave, psychedelic art rock with a hint of ethno-elements. They made some gigs and some recording sessions, unfortunately all the tapes are missing. The group disbanded two years later when Valdobrev was accepted to study acting at the Theatre and Film Academy in Sofia.

Despite his heavy studies there, he never quit his tend for singing and was eager to join the burgeoning Sofia music scene.

In the early 1990s Bulgaria was powered with the spirit of freedom, revolution and exaltation – the perfect background for creating rock music. A lot of new names and bands sprang up, bringing fresh air and sweeping away the old music controlled and censored by the Communist authorities.

His first record was a song called May, a new wave-like, alternative middle tempo record that was premiered and aired on National Radio.

In the next year, while being a member of the student's TV Show Coo-Coo, he garnered attention for a song called Cinema, which had later been added in the company's debut album, and turned out to be Valdobrev’s first released song ever.

In 1993 he started to work on his first solo album. Regarding his ambition in films and theatre he knew he couldn't afford himself to keep a regular band, so he decided to invite highly skilled and established rock and jazz musicians. A large number of performers took part in the album, but there were three of them that formed the core of the future long term partnership in touring and recording studio albums: Ivan Lechev – the guitar player of the Grammy Awarded band FSB, Stoyan Yankoulov – a jazz, rock and ethno drum player, and Vesselin Vesselinov (Eko) – bass-guitar and double-bass. (Later on, in 1999 Miroslav Ivanov - a young and talented guitarist joined the band to stay till the present.)

The music style of the first records was a mixture between alternative rock, new wave and ethno jazz music. But there was an unexpected 'factor' that finally took the lead and cast its mighty shadow over the other songs: a musical joke which Valdobrev created together with friend and colleague Kamen Donev on their way back from a theatre tour in Vienna. Tired of the long and boring trip they took a bunch of keys for percussion and started rapping over a three chord country-like gypsy tune I love you, my dear. Back in Sofia they recorded the song in less than an hour, adding the characteristic voice of their colleague, the young actress Maya Bejanska. Although this ditty was totally different from anything in the album, it was so catchy that the producers decided to release it as a single. In no time it became vastly popular and later gave its name to the album that sold over 130,000 copies. This success almost obliged Stefan, Kamen and Maya to repeat this direction. And in 1996 they joined for a single project – an album called Revolution. It was based on folklore and gypsy songs and used many ethno instruments and elements in a rock context. Meanwhile, in 1995 Valdobrev released a collection of his scores for theatre performances called A Night at the Theatre.

1998 was a turning point for him. When his solo album titled: ...to was released in October that same year, it topped the charts in the country, becoming a big critical and commercial success. The album spawned five number one hits: ...to, Heaven, One, Wolf and Yes and brought Valdobrev the annual music awards for Best Male Artist and Best Album. ...to represented a significant change in musical and thematic direction for Stefan and the band. Sonically the record incorporated influences from the Britpop and alternative rock of the time. And even if there were some songs with an impact from Bulgarian ethno music, the elements were very subtly dispersed into the prevailing guitar sound textures. A good example was the song One, featuring the Goran Bregovic Orchestra's folk singer Snejka Borisova. Until today, Valdobrev’s album ...to' is considered by many to be among the most influential and famous pop albums in the contemporary music scene in Bulgaria.

In the next several years Stefan Valdobrev's career reached its zenith. He has toured extensively for each of his albums and has released a total of 12 number one BG Charts singles. He further incorporated diverse styles into his music. Together with Arabel Karajan he performed the trip hop ballad Is it me, or is it not? for the 1999 film Dog's Home. The song became a major hit and that same year Valdobrev repeated his Best Male artist annual music award. Later he became the first artist to sign a contract with Universal Music Bulgaria.

In 2000 he made a dramatic shift and gradually ventured into more unconventional and more radio-unfriendly works. He focused on experimentation, guitar effects, tape looping, rhythm sequencing and sampling while developing his sixth studio album Propaganda, Chromosomes, Silicon. He sought a harder-hitting sound and headed a direction which was more into industrial music and alternative rock. Thematically it was a more personal and introspective record. Valdobrev’s lyrics have incorporated a variety of social, philosophical and political influences and appealed mainly to a vanishing counterculture in burgeoning hyper-consumerism. This album was unexpectedly darker and yielded decent reviews, but no major hits.

In 2001 Stefan Valdobrev decided to concentrate mainly on his acting career and took a long break from the music scene. For almost a decade he very sporadically released a few singles that became instant hits but it was, as he stated, "just to keep me in form". In 2006 he recorded the blue romantic song Fireworks, in 2009 the reggae-swing chart-topper The Riverbank Most Green, introducing the young future soul star Ruth Koleva.

During that period Valdobrev briefly resumed touring for a series of sold-out concerts, presenting mainly his theatre and film music and working with an orchestra of fifteen jazz, ethno and classical musicians. In 2007 he received a nomination for Best Male Artist of the decade by the National Music Television MM. After being away from the rock stage for nearly ten years, in 2012 Stefan Valdobrev decided to rejoin his old band "The Usual Suspects". They recorded two brand new songs: Helicopter and Snow on the Sahara and started a series of 25 club gigs and theatre hall shows.

=== Directing ===
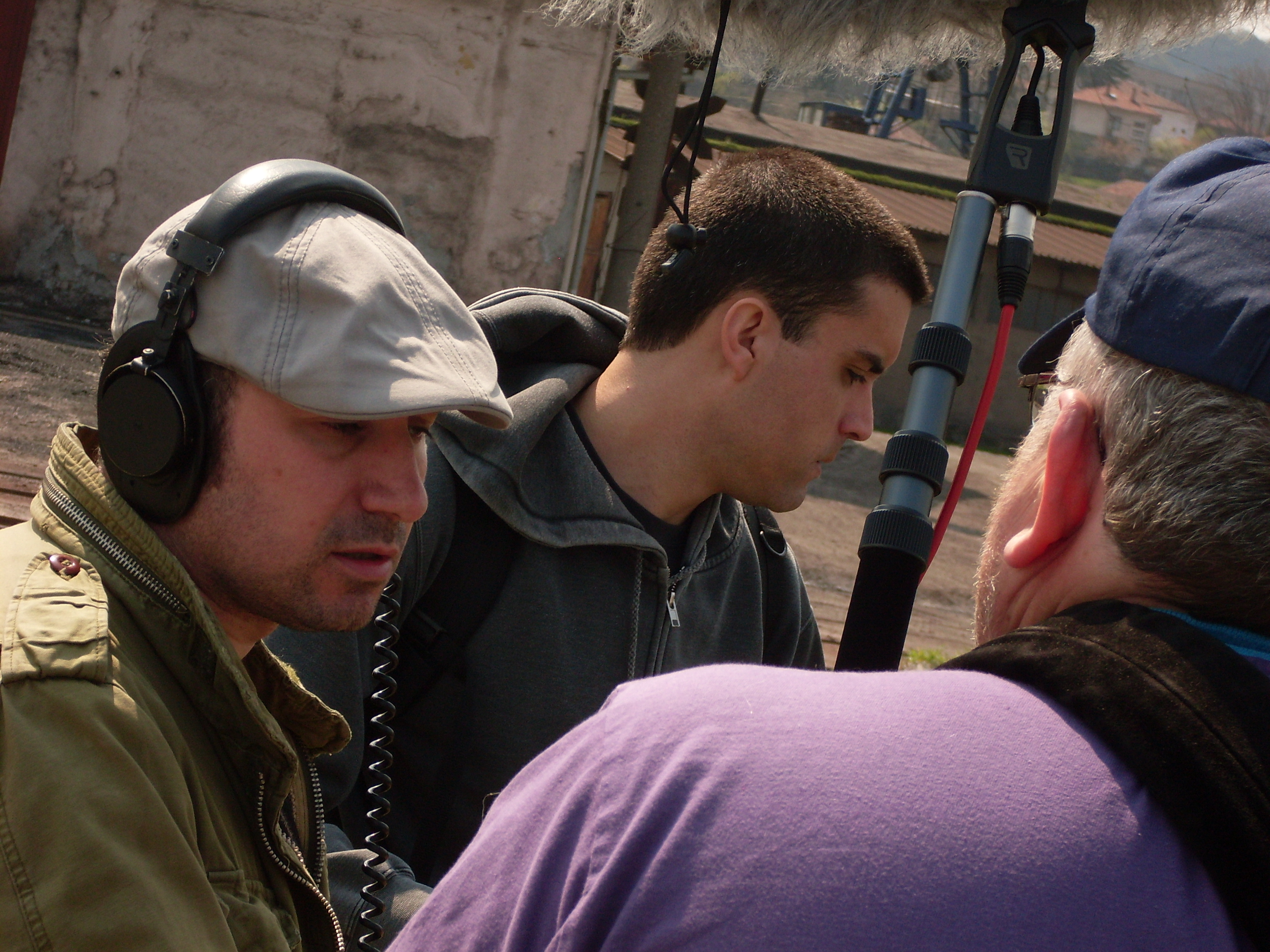
Filming My Mate Manchester United, 2008

In 2006-2007 Valdobrev spent two productive years specializing in film directing at the Academy of Performing Arts in Prague (FAMU). There he made a few short films, attended a Miloš Forman workshop and visited the lectures of Otakar Vavra and Jaromir Sofr. His graduate short film Hide in 2007, marked the beginning of a professional collaboration and friendship with the acclaimed Mexican director of photography Antonio Riestra.

Back in Sofia he started working on a documentary film project named My Mate Manchester United - the story of a 48-year-old football fan who changed his name to Manchester United. Valdobrev, together with the director of photography Krum Rodriguez decided to "follow the quest of this man's awkward dream to be named after his favorite football club and by getting close to the life of a Bulgarian builder and his memorable mates to create a moving social portrait of contemporary Bulgaria with its bewildered and confused people, so disappointed by the life in the country that they migrate to their own substitute reality. The journey started in Svishtov, a small town on the bank of the Danube river, told the story of the protagonist’s struggle with the authorities, lead all the way to Old Trafford Stadium, where he met his idol, the Manchester United top-striker Dimitar Berbatov, and ended up back home, raising questions about identity, about who we are and who we want to be".

Initially launched by Stanimir Trifonov and Vreme Film Studio, the project went through some difficulties, before being successfully finalized by producer Dragomir Keranov with the support of Desislav Dionisiev and Alexander Vrabevski.

The film was premiered on 10 March 2011 at the Sofia International Film Festival and has since then enjoyed a rich festival career, winning two international awards and being presented in the competition or the official selection of 21 major world film festivals: IDFA Amsterdam, HotDocs Toronto, ZagrebDox, Sarajevo and Warsaw among them.

Recently Valdobrev has been developing some feature film projects.

== Personal life ==
In 1996 Valdobrev married his high school love Jana. "We have many shared memories as childhood sweethearts in Stara Zagora. We were 10 when we first met. Our parents were coming back from an excursion, we got off the bus at the same station and headed in different directions. After a few meters I stopped and turned to look back. She had stopped too and was looking at me. We stood like that for a few moments, staring at each other, our parents holding our hands. Growing up with someone's memories and making that journey through adulthood together is probably what makes a relationship strong. No one knows me better than Jana." In 1998 Jana gave birth to their daughter Maria. Three weeks after that Valdobrev had a terrible car accident that almost cost him his life and kept him immovable and out of action for a year. For that reason he couldn’t join Regis Wargnier’s Oscar-nominated film production East/West, for which he'd been cast to play opposite Catherine Deneuve and Sandrine Bonnaire.

== Social life ==
The year of 1989, when Valdobrev attended the National Academy of Theatre and Film Arts, was crucial for the whole of Eastern Europe. The fall of the Communist regime in Bulgaria wasn't enough for the people and they demanded additional democratic reforms. Valdobrev became part of the strong student movement raised to power in the next few years of mass demonstrations, street riots, barricade protests and sieges of parliament. In 1990 the students caused a National strike by occupying all the Universities for more than a month. As a result the recently elected Communist President Petar Mladenov resigned. On the next year a new two-month-long occupation strike inflamed by the Art Academy students led to the resignation of the Communist Prime minister Andrey Lukanov. On 31 December 2006 Valdobrev hosted Bulgaria’s celebration concert for joining the EU. The event was held in Battenberg square in Sofia, and was attended by 80,000 people.

== Filmography ==
=== Actor ===
Year	Title	Role	Notes
1997	Compagnons Secrets	Schwartz	TV film
1999	Bloodsport 4: The Dark Kumite	Gills	Fiction film
2002	Warming Up Yesterday's Lunch	Popadamchev	Fiction film
2003	Encounter	The Journalist	TV film
2003	Pas de Trois	The Lover	Short film
2004	Burning Out	Enriko Corsa	Fiction film Golden Rose Film Festival Award for Best Actor
2007	Trade Routes	Mitko	Fiction film Nominated - Method Fest Independent Film Festival, Los Angeles for Best Ensemble Cast
2008	Escape To Freedom – L'aviatore	Fugitive	TV film
2008	The World Is Big and Salvation Lurks Around the Corner	Stoyan	Fiction film Academy Awards shortlist for Best Foreign Language Film
2010	Kill Me Again	The Husband	Short film
2010	The Glass River	Father Peter	Fiction film
2012	Migration of the Belted Bonito	Simo	Fiction film
2013	The Ungiven	Buko Levy	TV series
2014	Parking	The Driver	Short film
2014	Sinking of Sozopol	Doc	Fiction film Prague Independent Film Festival Grand Prix – Golden Sphinx, Best Director and Best Cinematography; Milano Film Festival Best Cast Award; New York International Film Festival award for Best Foreign Film
2014	She Is Waving from the Train	Village Man	Short film
2018	Away from the shore		Fiction film FUSION Film Fest Valencia - Award for best supporting actor in a foreign film
2019	Strangers		Short film
2019	A Dose of Happiness	Man in a wheelchair	Fiction film
2024	Alpha	Maxim Rusin	TV series

=== Composer ===
Year	Title	Notes
1994	Izmislici-Premislici	TV series
1996	Sindbad	Fiction film
1996	The Green Hedgehog	TV film
1997	The Nest	TV film
1997	Good Life	Fiction film
2000	Dog's Home	Fiction film Golden Rose Film Festival Award for Debut
2001	The Straw Orphan	TV film
2003	Alphabet of Hope	Documentary
2003	Camera, Curtain	TV series
2003	Short Stories	Documentary
2004	The House	TV film
2008	Kulicky	Fiction film
2008	Ogan I Voda	TV film
2008	The World Is Big and Salvation Lurks Around the Corner	Fiction film
2010	I Dream of Mummers	Documentary
2010	Killing In the Czech Way	Documentary
2011	My Mate Manchester United	Documentary
2011	Can You Talk?	Short film
2011	State of Shock	Fiction film
2012	Love in the Grave	Documentary
2013	Otazky pana Lasky	Documentary
2013	The Ungiven	TV series
2014	The Judgement	Fiction film
2019	Father's Day	TV series

=== Director ===
Year	Title	Notes
2002	Chromosomes	Music video
2006	Hana	Short film
2007	Hide	Short film
2009	100 years of Todor Kolev	TV film
2011	My Mate Manchester United	Documentary; Almaty International Film Festival Special Award; Minsk Listapad Film Festival Best Film-Portrait Award; Nominated - ZagrebDox for Best Regional Documentary; Nominated - Warsaw International Film Festival for Best Documentary
2012	Helicopter	Music video

=== Producer ===
2011	My Mate Manchester United	Documentary; Almaty International Film Festival Special Award; Minsk Listapad Film Festival Best Film-Portrait Award; Nominated - ZagrebDox for Best Regional Documentary; Nominated - Warsaw International Film Festival for Best Documentary
2019	Summer of the Usual Suspects	Documentary

== Theatre ==
=== Actor ===
Year	Title	Theatre	Notes
1992	Angel City	NATFIZ	
1993	Twelfth Night	Youth Theatre Sofia	
1993	Black Hole	NATFIZ	A'Askeer Award for Ensemble Cast Debut
1994	Agamemnon	National Palace of Culture	
1994	Woyzeck	Bulgarian Army Theatre	
1995	Learning To Fly	Bulgarian Army Theatre	
1997	Much Ado About Nothing	Bulgarian Army Theatre	
1997	The Master and Margarita	Bulgarian Army Theatre	
1998	Juan in Love	Satirical Theatre Sofia	
1999	And Give Us the Shadows	Bulgarian Army Theatre	
2000	Suburbia	Bulgarian Army Theatre	
2001	La Ronde	Bulgarian Army Theatre	
2001	Commedia del Servitore	Bulgarian Army Theatre	
2002	Eurydice	Bulgarian Army Theatre	
2002	Finale Grande	Bulgarian Army Theatre	
2003	Meteor	Bulgarian Army Theatre	
2004	Fantasmagorii	Bulgarian Army Theatre	
2005	The Brothers Karamazov	Dramatic Theatre Plovdiv	
2007	Small Play for a Children's Room	Theatre 199	
2008	Hamletmachine	Bulgarian Army Theatre; Theater Rampe Stuttgart; Theatre National du Luxembourg	
2009	Pleasantlyscary	Theatre 199	A'Askeer Award for Best Performance
2011	Blue/Orange	Theatre 199	
2013	People from Oz	Theatre 199	
2017	The Boy in the Last Row	Drama Theatre Plovdiv	
2017	Sentimental Tectonics	Drama Theatre Sliven	
2019	Evita	State Opera Plovdiv	
2022	Pieces of a Woman	Ivan Vazov National Theatre	

=== Composer ===
Year	Title	Theatre	Notes
1992	Angel City	NATFIZ	
1992	Chekhov - review	Youth Theatre Sofia	
1993	Twelfth Night	Youth Theatre Sofia	Nominated - A'Askeer Award for Best Original Music
1993	Black Hole	NATFIZ	
1994	The Fall of Ikarus	SFUMATO	
1994	Persifedron	Bulgarian Army Theatre	
1995	Lorenzaccio	National Theatre Bitola	
1996	Long Play	Satirical Theatre Sofia	
1997	Much Ado About Nothing	Bulgarian Army Theatre	
1998	Juan in Love	Satirical Theatre Sofia	
1998	Henry IV	Bulgarian Army Theatre	
1999	An Give Us the Shadows	Bulgarian Army Theatre	
1999	The Powder Keg	Bulgarian Army Theatre	
2000	Troilus and Cressida	Bulgarian Army Theatre	
2000	The Mediterraneans	Satirical Theatre Sofia	
2000	The Heroins	Dramatic Theatre Varna	
2002	Finale Grande	Bulgarian Army Theatre	
2003	The Powder Keg	Moscow Dramatic Theatre	
2003	The Phoney Civilization	Dramatic-puppet Theatre Shumen	
2003	Meteor	Bulgarian Army Theatre	
2003	Night before the Forest	Sofia Theatre	
2003	The Fourth Sister	Bulgarian Army Theatre	
2005	Day-off	Ivan Vazov National Theatre	
2005	Figures in a Love Flight	SFUMATO	Ikarus Theatre Award for Best Original Music
2005	Out of Control	Bulgarian Army Theatre	
2005	January	Youth Theatre Sofia	
2006	A Streetcar Named Desire	Bulgarian Army Theatre	
2006	Zmei	Dramatic-puppet Theatre Shumen	
2006	The Comedy of Errors	Bulgarian Army Theatre	
2006	The Cabinet Minister's Wife	Divadlo Disk	
2007	The Imaginary Invalid	Klicperovo divadlo	
2008	The Cabinet Minister's Wife	Mestske divadlo Most	
2008	Much Ado About Nothing	National Theatre Bitola	
2011	Working Hours	Ivan Vazov National Theatre	
2019	Take It Easy - songs by Stefan Valdobrev	Drama Theatre Plovdiv; Youth Theatre Sofia	

== Discography ==
=== Albums ===
Year	Title	Notes
1994	I love you, my dear	
1995	A Night at the Theatre	
1996	Revolution	
1998	…to	MM Music Award for Best Album; MM Music Award for Best Male Performer 1998; MM Music Award for Best Male Performer 1999; 2018 - remastered and reissued
2000	Dog's Home	Soundtrack
2001	Propaganda, Chromosomes, Silicon	Nominated - BG Radio Music Awards for Best Male Performer; Nominated - MM Music Awards for Best Rock/Alternative Album
2003	Opus Theatrale	
2006	Opus Theatrale 2	
2008	The World Is Big and Salvation Lurks Around the Corner	Soundtrack
2013	Stefan Valdobrev and The Usual Suspects: LIVE	Live album
2016	10½	Nominated - BG Radio Music Awards for Best Album; Nominated - BG Radio Music Awards 2018 for Best Band; Nominated - BG Radio Music Awards 2019 for Best Band

=== Singles ===
Year	Title	Notes
1997	One & Heaven	
2006	Fireworks	
2010	The Riverbank Most Green	feat. Ruth Koleva
2012	Helicopter	
2014	Snow on the Sahara	
2015	Hollywood	
2016	The World is Beroe	feat. the Usual Suspects, Poli Genova, Stanimir Gamov, Vanja Džaferović and fans A song commemorating the centenary of PFC Beroe Stara Zagora
2016	Take It Easy	
2017	This Song is not about Love	
2017	Samonedeymenervirataka (Picnic)	
2018	Just Like That	
2019	Beard Glue	

=== Tours ===
Year	Title	Notes
1996	Revolution Tour	
1999	…to Tour	
2000	Mason's Tour	
2001	Propaganda Tour	
2012	Stefan Valdobrev and The Usual Suspects	
2017	The Bar by the Sea and the Sea by the Bar: Summer tour 2017	
2017	European Tour 2017	
2018	20 Years ...To	
2018	Take It Easy Symphony	
2018	Take It Easy Symphony Christmas Tour	
2019	European Tour 2019	
2019	Five Summer Concerts (To Say Nothing of the Winter One)	

=== Music Videos and Films ===
Year	Title	Notes
1994	I Love you, My Dear	
1994	Alisa Reggae	
1995	Job	
1996	Ivana	
1997	Heaven	
1998	One	
1998	…to	
1999	Wolf	
1999	Yes	
1999	Tummy of a Penguin	music documentary
2000	Is it me, or is it not? (feat. Arabel Karajan)	
2001	Propaganda	
2001	Silicon	
2002	Exploadiram	
2002	Chromosomes	
2006	Fireworks	
2009	Backgammon Dice	
2012	Helicopter	
2014	Snow on the Sahara	
2015	Hollywood	
2016	The World is Beroe	
2016	Take It Easy	
2017	This Song is not about Love	
2017	Samonedeymenervirataka (Picnic)	
2018	Just like that	
2019	Summer of the Usual Suspects	music documentary
