= Every You Every Me (film) =

2024 romance drama film

- Festival release poster
- German: Alle die Du bist
- Directed by: Michael Fetter Nathansky
- Written by: Michael Fetter Nathansky
- Produced by: Virginia Martin; Michael Fetter Nathansky; Lucas Schmidt; Leave Scharpen; Wolfgang Cimera
- Starring: Aenne Schwarz; Carlo Ljubek
- Cinematography: Jan Mayntz
- Edited by: Andrea Mertens
- Music by: Gregor Keienburg
- Production companies: Contando Films (Berlin); Studio Central (Berlin)
- Distributed by: Port au Prince Pictures GmbH [de]
- Release dates: 16 February 2024 (Berlinale); 4 April 2024 (Germany)
- Running time: 104 minutes
- Countries: Germany; Spain
- Language: German

Every You Every Me (German: Alle die Du bist) is a 2024 romantic drama film written and directed by Michael Fetter Nathansky. The film starring Aenne Schwarz and Carlo Ljubek, is set against the industrial backdrop of Europe's largest lignite mining area, about the initial magic of falling in love and the painful process of falling out of love.

It was selected in the Panorama section at the 74th Berlin International Film Festival where it had its world premiere on 16 February 2024. It was theatrically released in Germany on 4 April 2024.

== Synopsis ==
Every You Every Me is a story of love and loss, of how it begins and how it ends. Nadine works hard at the factory, but her love life is falling apart. She wants to feel the same way she used to about her partner, but he seems like a different person now. What changed between them? How can she find the spark that ignited their romance?

== Cast ==
- Aenne Schwarz as Nadine
- Carlo Ljubek as Paul
  - Youness Aabbaz as young Paul
- Sara Fazilat as Ajda
- Naila Schuberth as Mica
- Moritz Klaus as Marco
- Dagmar Sachse as Mareike Schmitz
- David Hurten as Jurgen
- Frank Stüdgens as Dirk
- Peter Brachschuss as Uwe

== Production ==
The second feature film by German film director and screenwriter Michael Fetter Nathansky, working title Mannequins is produced by Studio Zentral/Network Movie and Contando Films with the participation of ZDF – Das kleine Fernsehenspiel.

Filming began in Cologne in North Rhine-Westphalia and the surrounding area from 17 February 2023. After total of 25 days of filming schedule it ended on 29 March 2023.

== Release ==
Every You Every Me had its world premiere on 16 February 2024, as part of the 74th Berlin International Film Festival, in Panorama.

In January 2024, Brussels based independent company 'Be For Films' acquired the international sales rights of the film.

It was released in German theaters on 4 April 2024 by Port-au-Prince Pictures GmbH [de].

== Reception ==
Serena Seghedoni reviewing at Berlinale in Loud And Clear Reviews awarded 3 stars and wrote, "Perhaps the movie would have worked better as a short film, which would have enabled Nathansky to use Paul’s many personas to explore the main theme of the film in more depth before they outstayed their welcome."

Giorgia Del Don reviewing the film at Berlinale for Cineuropa wrote, "Between realism and dream-state, Michael Fetter Nathansky depicts the complex relationship between a woman and her partner whom she can no longer stand but doesn’t dare leave."

== Accolades ==
Every You Every Me won two work-in-progress Awards, under its previous title Mannequins, at the 71st San Sebastián International Film Festival.

Award	Date	Category	Recipient	Result	Ref.
San Sebastián International Film Festival	27 September 2023	WIP Europa Industry Award + WIP Europa Award	Mannequins	Won	
Berlin International Film Festival	25 February 2024	Panorama Audience Award for Best Feature Film	Michael Fetter Nathansky	Nominated	
