= My Mate Manchester United =

- Directed by: Stefan Valdobrev
- Produced by: Stanimir Trifonov; Stefan Valdobrev; Dragomir Keranov; Zornitsa Popova
- Edited by: Kristian Budev
- Music by: Stefan Valdobrev; Comics
- Production companies: Across Works; Vreme Film Studio
- Distributed by: TVF International Ltd.
- Release date: March 10, 2011 (Sofia Film Festival)
- Running time: 55 minutes
- Country: Bulgaria
- Languages: Bulgarian, English

My Mate Manchester United (Bulgarian: Манчестър Юнайтед от Свищов, lit. 'Manchester United from Svishtov') is a Bulgarian documentary film written and directed by Stefan Valdobrev. The film premièred during the 2011 Sofia International Film Festival and went on to air at a number of international festivals around the world, including the Cannes Film Festival. The film follows the story of unemployed construction worker Martin Zdravkov Levidzhov from the Northern Bulgarian town of Svishtov and his struggle to have his name legally changed to that of his favourite football club Manchester United. The story does not concentrate on the fan or sports aspects of the story, but aims at showcasing the contemporary life in remote Bulgarian towns where people are disillusioned with economic woes and do everything possible to escape from the surrounding dire reality. The film raises questions about identity and the dream of being someone else.

My Mate Manchester United is the first documentary directed by Stefan Valdobrev. The director got interested in the story of Mr Levidzhov's struggle with Bulgarian institutions and legal system. Wondering about the motives, the inspiration, and frustration that forced a perfectly normal person to undertake such radical steps in transforming his personality, Valdobrev decided to document Levidzhov's story.

== Synopsis ==
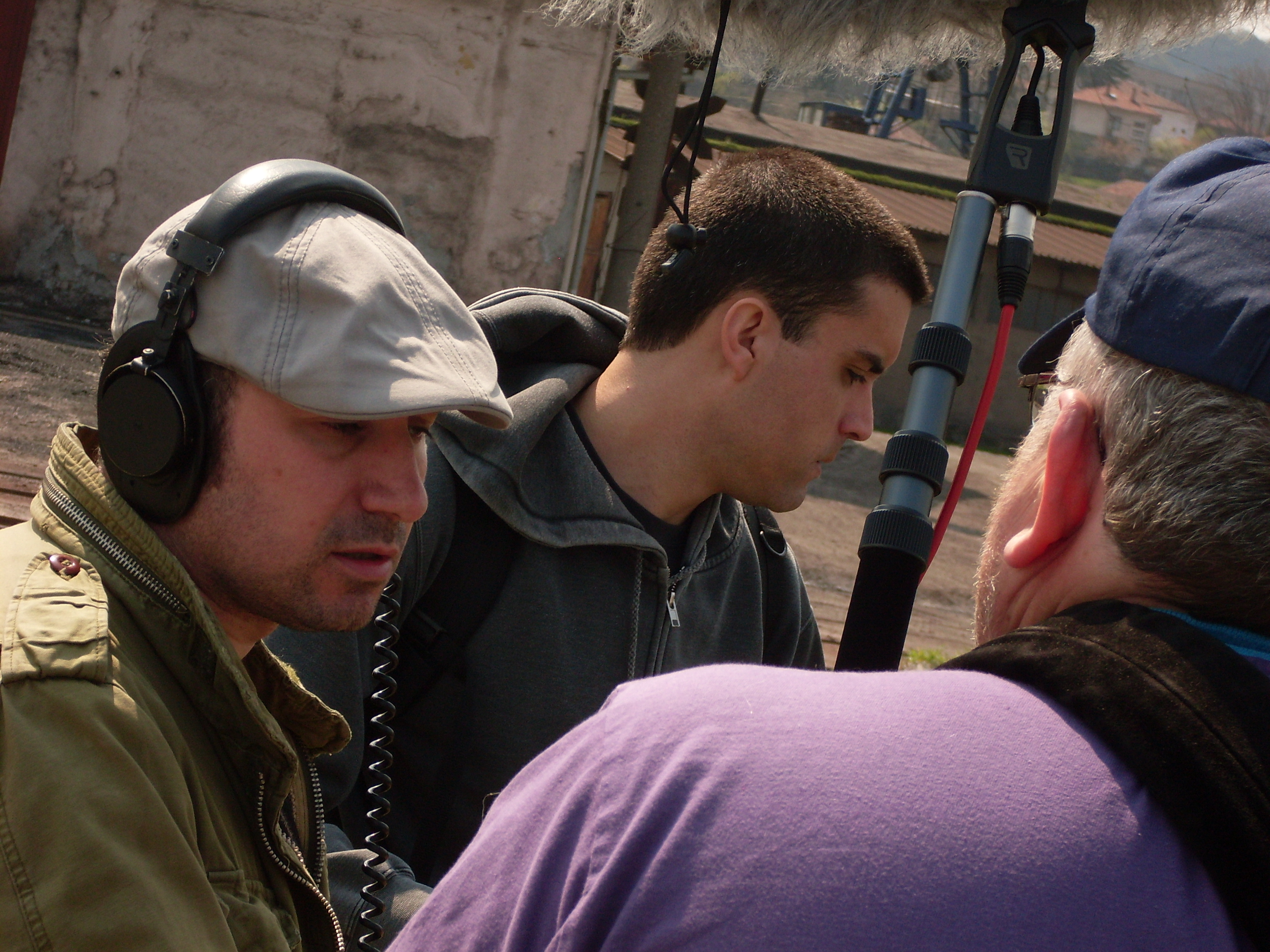
Director Stefan Valdobrev at the set of My Mate Manchester United

Martin Levidzhov's journey to becoming Mr Manchester United begins back in 1999 when he was watching the Champions League final between Manchester United and Bayern Munich. In the 89th minute of the match, he vowed to change his name to Manchester United if his favourite team managed to turn around the 0:1 negative score. The English team did it in the most dramatic of fashions, thus determining Levidzhov's future struggles for the next fifteen years. The protagonist then undertook his fight with the Bulgarian legal system to have his name changed, a right he was repeatedly denied by various court instances.

The majority of the film unfolds in the town of Svishtov located on the banks of the Danube River. Viewers get to know the life of Levidzhov-United, his family, his cat David Beckham (named after the former Man United star), and a multitude of his friends. They are all united in their disillusionment with life in Svishtov and Bulgaria as a whole as well as in their determination to achieve something and to become a someone. Levidzhov-United is himself a construction worker who struggles to secure permanent employment.

The culmination of the film is a phone call Levidzhov-United receives from the agent of then-Bulgaria and Man United star Dimitar Berbatov. The fan is informed he will get to travel to Manchester and watch his favourite team play a match at Old Trafford. The film once again focuses on Levidzhov-United's emotions of having his dream come true. He even gets to meet with Berbatov himself, receiving the shirt the football player wore during the match.

The closing minutes of the film are dedicated to Levidzhov-United's return to his home city where life continues as always, no matter how many of his dreams have come true.

== Nominations and awards ==
My Mate Manchester United was nominated for best documentary at both the Warsaw International Film Festival and ZagrebDox It won the Special Award at the Almaty International Film Festival as well as the Best Film-Portrait Award at the Minsk Listapad Film Festival.
