= Miroslav Ivanov (musician) =

Bulgarian guitar player (born 1977)

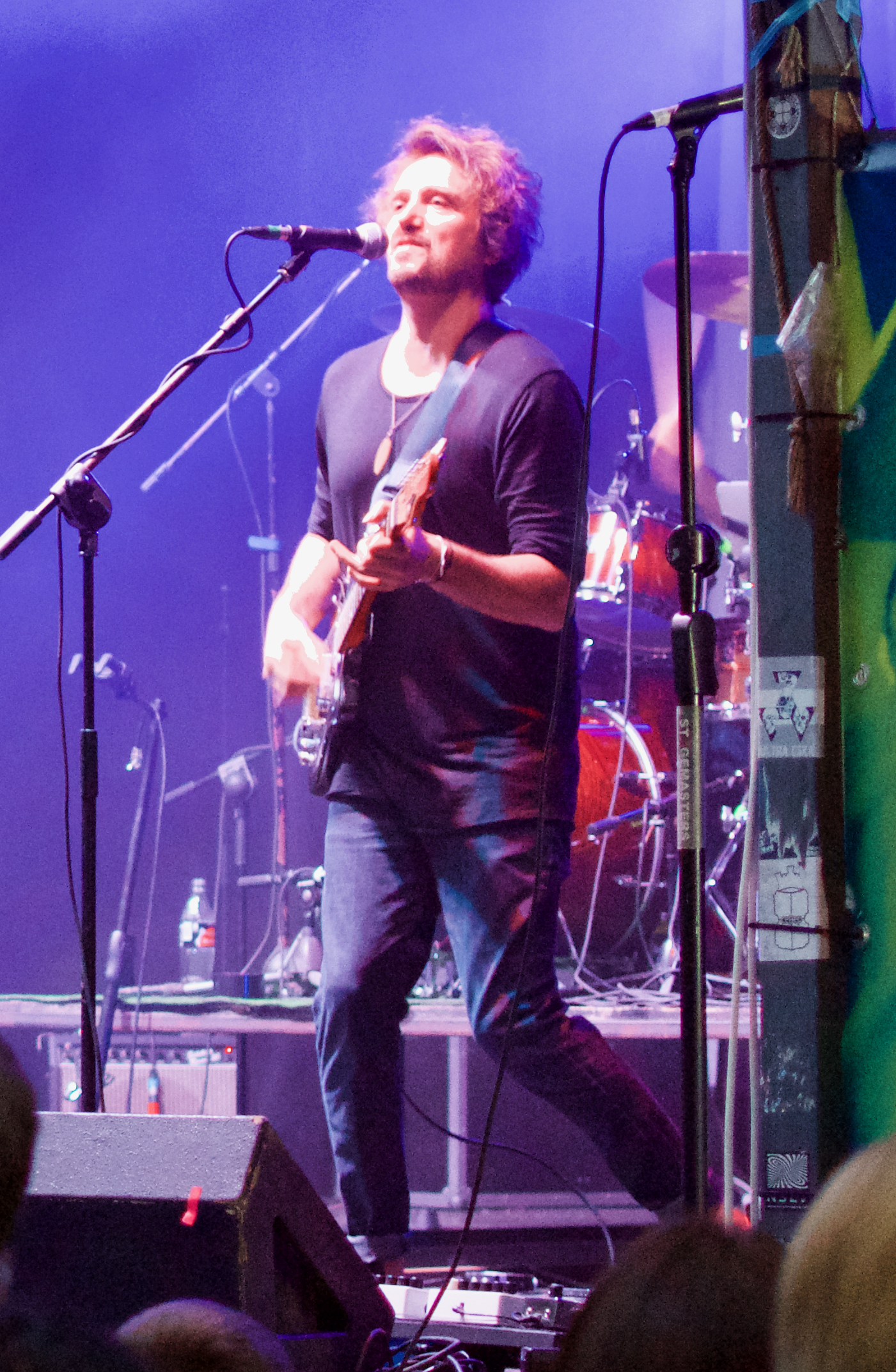
Miroslav Ivanov

Miroslav Ivanov (Bulgarian: Мирослав Иванов) is a Bulgarian guitar player, born on December 26, 1977, in Russe, Bulgaria. He graduated from Music School in Shumen. In his school years, he founded his first band DVX and recorded with them his first album. He obtained his Master of Music degree in Guitar at the National Academy of Music "Pantcho Vladigerov" in Sofia.

== Biography ==
In 1995, still as a student, he gave rise to the project Bals Band (1995) that became an integral part of the popular TV show “Kak Shte Gi Stignem” with Todor Kolev for two years. In 1998 Miroslav Ivanov won the grand prize of the contest Blues Brothers 2000, organized by the French Cultural Center as part of the official promotion of the movie.

In the same year Miroslav Ivanov also founded the well-known Bulgarian funky-jazz band Infinity – where he took on the role of guitarist and composer and released two albums – Happy Man Blues and Kolkoto-Tolkova (As Good as it Gets). Infinity appeared as a regular act at the biggest jazz festivals in Bulgaria and was a special guest at the prestigious Leipzig Book Fair in 1999.

In 2001 Miroslav founded the pop-rock SAFO bаnd and released with the formation his next album Kolelo Ot Sunishta (A Wheel of Dreams). The band was awarded the prestigious prize “Discovery of the Year” by BG Radio in 2003 and “Band the Year” in 2004. The single Pustinna Zemya (Desert Land) topped the chart “Song of the Year” on the Bulgarian National Radio. During this period SAFO performed at the biggest and most prestigious concerts and festivals in Bulgaria. SAFO produced another album in 2005 – Safo Live.

In 2008 Miroslav Ivanov left for Ireland where he joined the award-winning alternative rock band Amoric. As a guitarist and leading composer of Amoric he realised recordings in Dublin's Temple Lane Studios with Grammy-nominated US producer Bruce Sugar. The band recorded another album followed by numerous appearances at festivals in Ireland and Solfest in the UK.

In 2011 Miroslav returned to Bulgaria to proceed working on his own instrumental project Miroslav Ivanov Quartet (also known as Guitar Miro Quartet), focused on jazz, blues and world music. As a result the EP Northern Lights came to life.

In March 2013 Miroslav released his debut instrumental album Directions. The album was recorded under the independent label Music Clinic Records and features most of the best musicians in Bulgaria – Dimitar Semov, Milen Kukosharov, Radoslav Slavchev, Rossen Vatev, Dimitar Karamfilov, Stoyan Yankoulov, Mihail Yossifov. The album promotion was followed by a club tour by Miroslav Ivanov Quartet in the biggest Bulgarian cities with line-up: Miroslav Ivanov (guitar, vocals), Milen Kukosharov (piano), Dimitar Semov (drums), Radoslav Slavchev (bass)/Dimitar Karamfilov (double bass).

From 1997 onwards, Miroslav Ivanov proved to be a sought after guitarist. His live and studio collaborations with musicians on the Bulgarian pop and jazz scene included Arabel Karayan, Lili Ivanova, Vasil Naydenov, Kamelia Todorova, Vassil Petrov, Dynamite Brass Band, Elitza Todorova & Stoyan Yankoulov, Beloslava, Todor Kolev, and Stefan Valdobrev.

Miroslav Ivanov has also performed with German jazz band De-Phazz at their concert in Bulgaria in 2009 with Big Band Brass Association under the direction of maestro Angel Zaberski.

Recently the musician took part in the tribute project ABBA R’n’B Acoustic Tribute, once again in collaboration with leading Bulgarian musicians – Radoslav Slavchev (bass), Rossen Vatev (percussion), Rossen Kukosharov (vocals).

He recorded guitars for various Bulgarian film projects – the soundtrack of the movie Pansion za Kucheta (Dog Boarding School) (2000), and the TV series Hotel Bulgaria (2004) and Nedadenite (The Ungiven) (2013).

In the end of 2013 Miroslav Ivanov released his first independent single “Tsuk” – an experimental blend of pop and avant-garde music. The entire production of the song is his work – he wrote the music, lyrics and arrangement and recorded his vocals on it.

From the beginning of 2014 Miroslav Ivanov is actively playing gigs with his quartet, with funk band Southwick and cross-over string formation Hypnotic. He is as well realizing studio recordings with alternative power-rock trio Saint Electrics.
