= Ashram (band) =

Neoclassical band from Italy

Ashram is a neoclassical band from Italy consists of Sergio Panarella, Luigi Rubino, Alfredo Notarloberti and Leonardo Massa. Their songs typically comprise piano, violin, cello and vocals, and is not to be confused with Indian-European oriental rock band of the same name.

== Discography ==
- For My Sun (2001)
- Ashram (2002)
  - Elisewin
  - For My Sun
  - I′ve Lost Myself
  - Forever at Your Mercy
  - Spirit of the Rising Moon
  - Sweet Autumn
  - Lucky's Song
  - Meditation Song
  - Nevermore Sorrow
  - She's Fiddling
  - Sitar Sniff
  - Fairy Wind
  - Silver Eyes
- Shining Silver Skies (2006)
  - Shining Silver Skies
  - Tango Para Mi Padre Y Marialuna
  - All′Imbrunire
  - Ultima Carillon
  - Rose and Air
  - For Each and Every Child
  - Maria and the Violin's String
  - IL Mostro
  - Sweet Autumn, Part II
  - Last Kiss
  - 5 Steps...
  - Elizabeth
  - Lullaby
  - Lady
- Gathered Under Shining Silver Skies (2010)
- Human and Divine (2017)
  - Spirituality
  - When The Moon Dance
  - Un Tramonto Infinito
  - Elevation
  - Resurrection
  - Marie's sad song
  - Child's heartbeat
  - Shine on me
  - Elisewin 1997
  - Good night
  - Air
  - Marilin
  - Gather all your flowers
