= Carlo Ljubek =

German actor (born 1976)

- Born: 21 May 1976 (age 50); Bocholt, West Germany
- Occupation: Actor

Carlo Ljubek (born 21 May 1976) is a Croatian-German actor.

== Life ==
Carlo Ljubek was born the son of Croatian migrants in Bocholt, Germany. He graduated after his actor's training 2002 in Munich, Germany at the Otto Falckenberg School. At the Munich theatre (Münchner Kammerspiele), which is affiliated to the school, he performed in Shakespeare's What You Will, among other plays. He then performed at the Hessisches Staatstheater Wiesbaden, Germany from 2002 to 2007. Since summer 2007 he has been employed at the Cologne Playhouse (Kölner Schauspiel), where he had successful roles as Siegfried (Nibelungen Saga) and Jason (The Golden Fleece).

After a few appearances on German TV, he further appeared in movie productions, such as Sherry Horman's Guys and Balls and Stefan Komandarev's The World Is Big and Salvation Lurks Around the Corner (based on the novel of Ilija Trojanow).

He is married to the actress Maja Schöne and they have a daughter.^{[2]}

== Theater ==
=== 1999 to 2002, Münchner Kammerspiele ===
- Golem, director: Carsten Dane, Christopher Blenkinsop
- Twelfth Night (or What You Will) (Shakespeare), director: Erich Siedler
- Wegen zu geschlossen, director: Dominik Flaschka

=== 2002 to 2007, Staatstheater Wiesbaden ===
- A Midsummer Night's Dream (Shakespeare), director: Manfred Beilharz, role: Lysander
- Don Carlos (Schiller), director: András Fricsay, role: Don Carlos
- Hamlet (Shakespeare), director: Tilman Gersch, role: Hamlet
- Hase Hase (Coline Serreau), director: Pavel Mikulastik, roles: policeman 1, narrator, little soldier
- Kur Guerilla (John von Düffel), director: Beat Fäh role: Manuel
- Leonce and Lena (Georg Büchner), director: Tilman Gersch, role: Leonce
- Plastilin (Wassilij Sigarew), director: Rüdiger Burbach, role: Maxim
- What You Will (Shakespeare), director: Tillmann Gersch, roles: Fabian, Sebastian

=== 2007 to 2009, Kölner Schauspiel ===
- Die Nibelungen (Friedrich Hebbel), director: Karin Beier, roles: Siegfried, Etzels footman
- The Misanthrope (Molière), director: Karin Henkel, role: Philinte
- The Golden Fleece (Franz Grillparzer), director: Karin Beier, roles: Jason, Phryxus
- Faust Teil 1 (Johann Wolfgang von Goethe), director: Laurent Chétouane
- Spieltrieb (Juli Zeh), director: Jette Steckel, role: Alev

== Film / TV ==
- 2000: Volltanken (short)
- 2000: Meine Tochter darf es nie erfahren
- 2001: Die Verbrechen des Professor Capellari
- 2004: Going Home
- 2004: Affäre zu dritt
- 2004: Guys and Balls
- 2004: Off Beat
- 2005: Gisela
- 2005: Stürmisch verliebt
- 2006: Die Österreichische Methode
- 2006: Wie Licht schmeckt
- 2006: Deutschmänner
- 2004: Rabenbrüder
- 2004: Lulu
- 2006: Stubbe – Von Fall zu Fall: Verhängnisvolle Freundschaft
- 2006: Unter anderen Umständen: Bis dass der Tod euch scheidet
- 2007: Teufelsbraten
- 2007: The World is Big and Salvation Lurks Around the Corner
- 2007: Der Baader Meinhof Komplex (written by Bernd Eichinger)
- 2008: Stolberg: Blutgrätsche
- 2008: Die blaue Periode (short)
- 2008: Jedem das Seine
- 2009: Schuldig
- 2010: Shahada
- 2013: West
- 2017: Luna
- 2024: Every You Every Me
