= The World Is Big and Salvation Lurks Around the Corner =

The World is Big and Salvation Lurks Around the Corner
- Directed by: Stephan Komandarev
- Screenplay by: Yuriy Dachev; Stephan Komandarev; Dušan Milić
- Based on: Die Welt ist groß und Rettung lauert überall by Ilija Trojanow
- Produced by: Stefan Kitanov; Karl Baumgartner; Thanassis Karathanos; András Muhi; Danijel Hočevar
- Starring: Miki Manojlović; Carlo Ljubek; Hristo Mutafchiev; Ana Papadopulu
- Cinematography: Emil Hristow
- Edited by: Nina Altaparmakova
- Music by: Stefan Valdobrev
- Release dates: 14 March 2008 (SIFF); 10 October 2008 (Worldwide)
- Running time: 105 min.
- Countries: Bulgaria; Germany; Slovenia; Hungary
- Languages: Bulgarian; German; Italian; Slovenian

The World is Big and Salvation Lurks Around the Corner (Bulgarian: Светът е голям и спасение дебне отвсякъде, romanized: Svetat e golyam i spasenie debne otvsyakade) is a 2008 drama road movie co-written and directed by Stephan Komandarev, starring Miki Manojlović, Carlo Ljubek, Hristo Mutafchiev and Ana Papadopulu. It is based on the autobiographic novel Die Welt ist groß und Rettung lauert überall by Bulgarian-German writer Ilija Trojanow. It is a co-production between Bulgaria, Slovenia, Germany and Hungary

The film has received generally favorable reviews from film critics and audiences around the world, having received more than 20 festival awards. On January 20, 2010, it was revealed that the film had been selected among the nine films that will advance to the next round of voting in the Foreign Language Film category for the 82nd Academy Awards, but was not nominated.

== Plot ==
In a small Bulgarian provincial town during the 1980s, factory worker Vasil 'Vasko' Georgiev (Hristo Mutafchiev) has problems with the local Communist Party agent (Nikolai Urumov) who wants Vasko to monitor and report on the activities of his father-in-law, Bai Dan (Miki Manojlović). Bai Dan is the local "King of Backgammon" and is accused by the local authorities of conducting an illegal workshop in which he repairs bicycles and manufactures backgammon sets. Facing a moral dilemma, Vasko decides to emigrate beyond the Iron Curtain to Western Europe with his wife Yana (Ana Papadopulu) and his son Aleksander 'Sashko' (played as a child by Blagovest Mutafchiev). The family succeeds in crossing the border to Italy but face the prospect of lengthy detention in a bleak refugee camp until Vasko is able to pay for them to be smuggled into Germany.

The opening sequences jump abruptly from the birth of Sashko to the 2007 autobahn car accident in which his parents are killed on their way back to Bulgaria for the first time since their emigration. Sashko (played as an adult by Carlo Ljubek) is taken to a hospital with amnesia. His grandfather Bai Dan decides to go to Germany and try to help Sashko restore his past. He starts teaching him to play backgammon. After refusing to play, Sashko is forced by his grandfather to leave the hospital and to start a journey with him on a tandem bicycle—a journey back to Bulgaria, to Sashko's past, and to romance and prospects of a happier future.

== Cast ==
Actor	Role
Miki Manojlović	Bai Dan
Carlo Ljubek	Aleksander 'Sashko' Georgiev
Hristo Mutafchiev	Vasil 'Vasko' Georgiev
Ana Papadopulu	Yana Georgieva
Lyudmila Cheshmedzhieva	Baba Sladka
Nikolai Urumov	Agent
Vasil Vasilev-Zueka	Ivo Chikagoto
Dorka Gryllus	Maria
Heinz Josef Braun	Dr. Schreiber
Stefan Valdobrev	Stoyan

== Awards ==
The film has received more than 20 awards at festivals around the world:

=== 2009 ===
- (Italy) Saturno International Film Festival - Saturno d’Oro for Best Film, Best Actor Award for Miki Manojlović
- (Belarus) Minsk International Film Festival - Golden Listopad for Best Film
- (Eritrea) Festival of European Cinema - Audience Award
- (Spain) Benalmadena International Film Festival - Best Film Award, Jury Award
- (Portugal) Festroia International Film Festival - Best Director Award, SIGNIS Award, Audience Award
- (Albania) Duress International Film Festival - Best Director Award
- (Ukraine) Sevastopol Film Festival - Best Actor Award for Miki Manojlović
- (Taiwan) Taipei International Film Festival - Audience Award
- (Kazakhstan) Almaty International Film Festival - Best Actor Award for Miki Manojlović
- (Lithuania) Vilnius International Film Festival - Grand Prix for Best Film, Special Jury Award for Acting to Miki Manojlović

=== 2008 ===
- (Estonia) Black Nights International Film Festival - Jury Special Mention, ‘Don Quijote Award’ of the International Association of the Film Clubs
- (Bulgaria) Film and the City Film Festival - Best Film Award
- (Switzerland) Zurich International Film Festival - Audience Award
- (Bulgaria) Golden Rose National Feature Film Festival - Best Screenplay, Best Cinematographer
- (Poland) Warsaw International Film Festival - Jury Special Award
- (Norway) Bergen International Film Festival - Main Jury Award „Cinema Extraordinaire”
- (Bulgaria) Sofia International Film Festival - Best Bulgarian Film, Audience Award

== See also ==
- List of Bulgarian submissions for the Academy Award for Best Foreign Language Film
- List of submissions to the 82nd Academy Awards for Best Foreign Language Film
