= Angel City (play) =

1976 play written by Sam Shepard

- Written by: Sam Shepard
- Characters: Lanx; Wheeler; Miss Scoons; Rabbit; Tympani; Sax
- Original language: English
- Genre: Drama

Premiere
- Date premiered: 2 July 1976
- Place premiered: Magic Theatre, San Francisco, California, US

Angel City is a play by Sam Shepard. Set in Hollywood, the play concerns an attempted collaboration between Wheeler – a film industry insider – and ambitious newcomer Rabbit.

== Synopsis ==
Rabbit Brown, playwright, is approached by two Hollywood producers who ask him to rescue their eight million dollar movie to save them from bankruptcy. One of the producers develops a green rash – a metaphor for his greed, a condition that Rabbit Brown eventually catches as well.

The play has a cast of one woman and five men. It is a full length political satire.

== Production history ==
Angel City was first produced at the Magic Theatre in San Francisco on July 2, 1976. The cast was as follows:

- Lanx – Jack Thiebeau
- Wheeler – John Nesci
- Miss Scoons – O-Lan Shepard
- Rabbit – Ebie Roe Smith
- Tympani – James Dean
- Sax – Bob Feldman
- Directed by Sam Shepard

Original music for the production was composed and performed by Bob Feldman. In March 1977, the play premiered at the McCarter Theater in Princeton, New Jersey, directed by Michael Kahn. The cast included Christine Baranski as Miss Scoons. In October 1980, a production of the show was performed in the Loeb Experimental theater.

In 1984, the American Repertory Theatre staged a production of Angel City at Hasty Pudding Theater. It was directed by David Wheeler with set design by Kate Edmunds, costume design by Lynn Jeffrey and Elizabeth Perlman, and lighting design by Thom Palm. Music for the production was composed by Joel Press. The cast included Ben Halley, Jr. as Tympani, Harry S. Murphy as Lanx, John Bottoms as Rabbit Brown, Karen MacDonald as Miss Scoons, and Thomas Derrah as Wheeler. In 1989, Ensemble Arts Theatre in Los Angeles ran the show, directed by Ginny-Lynn Safford.

Angel City is licensed by Concord Theatricals. It is available in the collection Fool for Love and Other Plays.
