= Ashram (rock band) =

Indian-European oriental rock band

- Origin: Germany
- Genres: Oriental Rock
- Years active: 2004–present
- Website: www.ashram-music.com

Ashram is an Indian-European oriental rock band based in Austria. They are known for performing music in several jails in Austria, Germany, and India.

== History ==
The band was formed in 2004 during Austrian guitarist Boris Seidl visit to India, where he met Ajaya Gopi. They are considered the successor music band of Fur Balloon.

In 2005, Ashram undertook a seven-week tour throughout Europe. A year, they recorded their debut album in Trivandrum, which they titled Ashram - the spirit, and published it in the same year.

Between 2007 and 2011, Ashram toured three times in Europe and one time in India, performing their released music.

In 2011, their second album, Prison Without Walls, was released. The album was produced by a Grammy winner, Thom Russo.

In 2012, a tour dubbed "Prison Tour" visited a number of jails.

== Albums ==
- Ashram - the spirit (2006)
- Prison Without Walls (2011)
- Siddhartha (2022)

== Awards and recognition ==
- Austrian Band of the Year
