= List of Wesley Snipes performances =

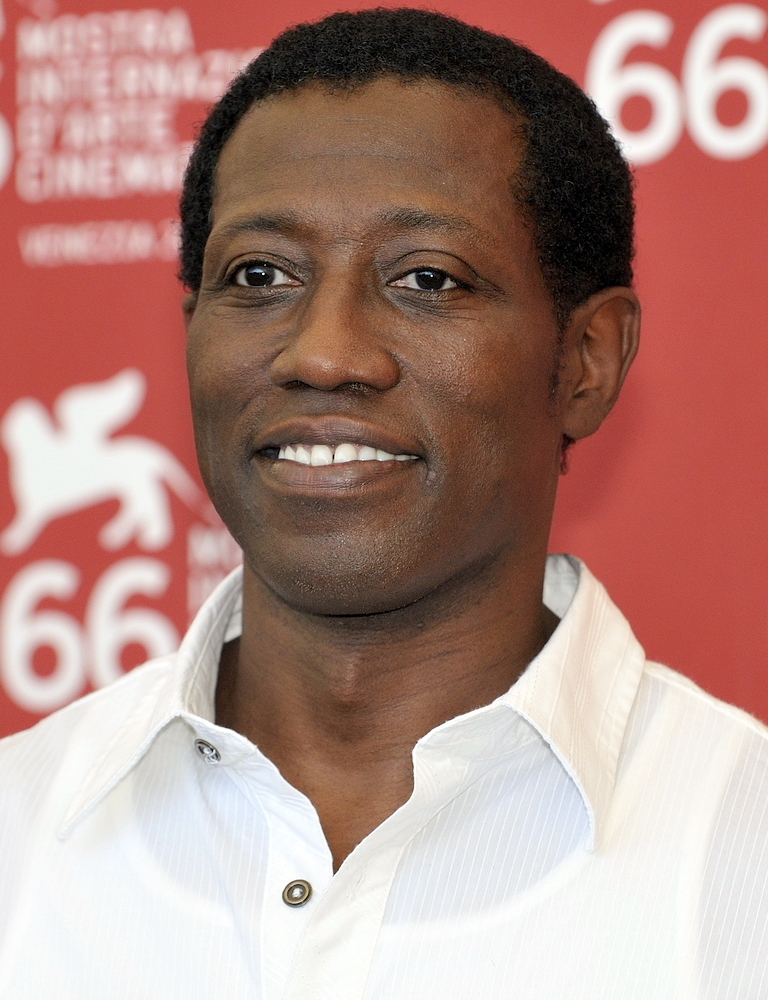
In September 2009

American actor, film producer, and martial artist Wesley Snipes started his acting career in the 1980s with a one episode appearance on the soap opera All My Children (1984). His first film roles were both in 1986 in Wildcats and Streets of Gold. He then appeared as Willie Mays Hayes in the 1989 sports comedy film Major League with Tom Berenger and Charlie Sheen. He had prominent roles in the 1990s, starring in the films: New Jack City with Ice-T (1991), Jungle Fever with Annabella Sciorra and Anthony Quinn (1991), White Men Can't Jump with Woody Harrelson (1992), Rising Sun with Sean Connery (1993), Demolition Man with Sylvester Stallone (1993), To Wong Foo, Thanks for Everything! Julie Newmar with Patrick Swayze and John Leguizamo (1995), and U.S. Marshals with Tommy Lee Jones (1998). Also in 1998, he was cast as Eric Brooks / Blade in the film Blade, based on the Marvel Comics superhero of the same name, a role he went on to reprise in Blade II (2002), Blade: Trinity (2004) and Deadpool & Wolverine (2024).

Snipes had smaller roles during the 2000s, most of them being direct-to-video before returning to the theatrical release, cast as Doctor "Doc" Death in the 2014 action film The Expendables 3 where he was reunited working with Sylvester Stallone. He teamed up with Eddie Murphy to co-star in the biographical comedy film Dolemite Is My Name as D'Urville Martin (2019) and the comedy film Coming 2 America (2021), as General Izzi.

His television work includes multiple episodes in drama series H.E.L.P. (1990), action thriller crime drama series The Player (2015), and drama limited series True Story (2021), opposite Kevin Hart.

== Film ==
Year	Title	Role	Notes	Ref.
1986	Wildcats	Trumaine		
1986	Streets of Gold	Roland Jenkins		
1987	Critical Condition	Ambulance Driver	Cameo	
1989	Major League	Willie Mays Hayes		
1990	King of New York	Detective Thomas Flanigan		
1990	Mo' Better Blues	Shadow Henderson		
1991	New Jack City	Nino Brown		
1991	Jungle Fever	Flipper Purify		
1992	The Waterdance	Raymond Hill		
1992	White Men Can't Jump	Sidney "Syd" Deane		
1992	Passenger 57	Chief John Cutter		
1993	Boiling Point	Agent Jimmy Mercer		
1993	Rising Sun	Lieutenant Webster "Web" Smith		
1993	Demolition Man	Simon Phoenix		
1993	Sugar Hill	Romello "Rome" Skuggs		
1994	Drop Zone	U.S. Marshal Pete Nessip		
1995	To Wong Foo, Thanks for Everything! Julie Newmar	Noxeema Jackson		
1995	Money Train	Officer John Robinson		
1995	Waiting to Exhale	James Wheeler	Uncredited cameo	
1996	The Fan	Bobby Rayburn		
1996	John Henrik Clarke: A Great and Mighty Walk	None	Documentary film; executive producer only	
1997	Murder at 1600	Detective Harlan Regis		
1997	One Night Stand	Maximilian "Max" Carlyle	Limited release	
1998	U.S. Marshals	Mark J. Sheridan / Mark Roberts / Mark Warren		
1998	The Big Hit	None	Producer only	
1998	Down in the Delta	Will Sinclair	Limited release; also producer	
1998	Blade	Eric Brooks / Blade	Also producer and martial arts choreographer	
1999	Play It to the Bone	Ringside Fan	Limited release; cameo	
2000	The Art of War	Agent Neil Shaw	Also executive producer	
2002	Liberty Stands Still	Agent Alex / Joe	Limited release	
2002	Zig Zag	David "Dave" Fletcher	Limited release	
2002	Blade II	Eric Brooks / Blade	Also producer and fight coordinator	
2002	Undisputed	Monroe "Undisputed" Hutchens	Also executive producer	
2004	Unstoppable	Agent Dean Cage	Limited release; also producer	
2004	Blade: Trinity	Eric Brooks / Blade	Also producer	
2005	7 Seconds	Jack Tulliver	Direct-to-video	
2005	The Marksman	Enter "The Marksman" Painter	Direct-to-video	
2005	Chaos	Lorenz / Jason York	Direct-to-video	
2006	The Detonator	Agent Sonni Griffith	Direct-to-video	
2006	Hard Luck	Lucky	Direct-to-video	
2007	The Contractor	Agent James Jackson Dial	Direct-to-video	
2008	The Art of War II: Betrayal	Agent Neil Shaw	Direct-to-video	
2009	Brooklyn's Finest	Casanova "Caz" Phillips		
2011	Game of Death	Agent Marcus Jones	Direct-to-video	
2012	Revelations of the Mayans: 2012 and Beyond	None	Documentary film; executive producer only	
2012	Gallowwalkers	Aman	Direct-to-video	
2014	The Expendables 3	Doctor "Doc" Death		
2015	Chi-Raq	Sean "Cyclops" Andrews	Limited release	
2017	The Recall	"The Hunter"	Limited release; also producer	
2017	Armed Response	Isaac	Direct-to-video; also producer	
2019	Dolemite Is My Name	D'Urville Martin	Limited release	
2020	Cut Throat City	Lawrence	Limited release	
2021	Coming 2 America	General Izzi	Streaming release	
2023	Back on the Strip	Luther "Mr. Big"	Limited release; also producer	
2024	Deadpool & Wolverine	Eric Brooks / Blade		
2025	Another Other	Unknown	Short film	

== Television ==
Year	Title	Role	Notes	Ref.
1984	All My Children	Marty	Episode: "Episode #1.3877"	
1986	Miami Vice	Silk	Episode: "Streetwise"	
1987	Vietnam War Story	Bookman	Episode: "An Old Ghost Walks the Earth"	
1989	A Man Called Hawk	Nicholas Murdock	2 episodes	
1989	The Days and Nights of Molly Dodd	Hood	Episode: "Here's Why You Should Always Make Your Bed in the Morning"	
1990	H.E.L.P.	Officer Lou Barton	6 episodes	
1996	America's Dream	George Du Vail	Television film	
1997	Happily Ever After: Fairy Tales for Every Child	The Pied Piper	Episode: "The Pied Piper"; voice role	
1998	Masters of the Martial Arts Presented by Wesley Snipes	None	Television documentary film; executive producer only	
1998	Futuresport	Obike Fixx	Television film; also producer	
2000	Disappearing Acts	Franklin Swift	Television film; also executive producer	
2001	Dr. Ben	None	Television documentary film; executive producer only	
2003	The Bernie Mac Show	Duke	Episode: "Bernie Mac Rope-a-Dope"	
2015	The Player	Mr. Johnson	9 episodes	
2018	Represent	Unknown	Episode: "Wesley Snipes Talks Blade and Black Panther"	
2019	What We Do in the Shadows	Wesley	Episode: "The Trial"	
2021	True Story	Carlton	7 episodes	
2023	Moon Girl and Devil Dinosaur	Maris Morlak	2 episodes; voice role	
2025–2027	Paper Empire	Damon Moore	2 episodes	

== Theatre ==
Year	Title	Role	Venue	Notes	Ref.
1986	Execution of Justice	Sister Boom Boom	Broadway		

== Music videos ==
Year	Title	Role	Performer	Notes	Ref.
1987	"Bad"	Mini Max	Michael Jackson		

== Soundtrack appearances ==
Year	Title	Song	Notes	Ref.
1986	Wildcats	"Football Rap (End Credits)"	Uncredited	
1990	Mo' Better Blues	"Pop Top 40"		
2015	The Tonight Show Starring Jimmy Fallon	"Fame"	Episode: "Kaley Cuoco-Sweeting/Wesley Snipes/Chris Cornell"; uncredited	

== Video games ==
Year	Title	Voice role	Notes	Ref.
1994	Demolition Man	Simon Phoenix	Live action full-motion video	
2011	Julius Styles: The International	Julius Styles		
