= Expend4bles =

2023 film by Scott Waugh

- Theatrical release poster
- Directed by: Scott Waugh
- Screenplay by: Kurt Wimmer; Tad Daggerhart; Max Adams
- Story by: Spenser Cohen; Kurt Wimmer; Tad Daggerhart
- Based on: Characters by David Callaham
- Produced by: Kevin King-Templeton; Les Weldon; Yariv Lerner; Jason Statham
- Starring: Jason Statham; Sylvester Stallone; Curtis "50 Cent" Jackson; Megan Fox; Dolph Lundgren; Tony Jaa; Iko Uwais; Randy Couture; Andy Garcia
- Cinematography: Tim Maurice-Jones
- Edited by: Michael J. Duthie
- Music by: Guillaume Roussel
- Production companies: Millennium Media; Templeton Media; Grobman Films
- Distributed by: Lionsgate
- Release dates: September 15, 2023 (Mainland China); September 22, 2023 (United States)
- Running time: 104 minutes
- Country: United States
- Language: English
- Budget: $100 million
- Box office: $51 million

Expend4bles (also known as The Expendables 4) is a 2023 American action film a sequel to The Expendables 3 (2014) and the fourth and final installment in The Expendables franchise. The film stars an ensemble cast of largely action film stars, with Jason Statham, Dolph Lundgren, Randy Couture and Sylvester Stallone reprising their roles from previous films while Curtis "50 Cent" Jackson, Megan Fox, Jacob Scipio, Levy Tran, Tony Jaa, Iko Uwais and Andy Garcia appear in new roles. It was directed by Scott Waugh and written by Kurt Wimmer, Tad Daggerhart and Max D. Adams.

Expend4bles was released in China on September 15, 2023, and in the United States a week later, by Lionsgate. The film received negative reviews from critics and grossed $51 million worldwide against a budget of $100 million, making it a box-office bomb. It was nominated for seven Golden Raspberry Awards, winning two, for Worst Supporting Actor and Worst Supporting Actress.

== Plot ==
The Expendables are sent to Libya to prevent mercenary Suarto Rahmat from stealing nuclear warheads for a mysterious terrorist named Ocelot. The team is led by Barney Ross and formed of members Lee Christmas, Toll Road, and Gunner Jensen, with Easy Day and Galan as their recruits. However, they are incapacitated when all of their vehicles are destroyed in the ensuing fight. When Rahmat shoots their plane down, the team finds what appears to be Barney's burned corpse in the wreckage, identified solely by his ring.

At Barney's memorial service, CIA operative Marsh reveals the team will pursue Ocelot and Rahmat, but without Christmas, who jeopardized the mission trying to save Barney. He is replaced by Gina, his former lover, who also brings an operative named Lash into the team. The team travels to Asia, but is secretly tracked by Christmas, who had slipped Gina a tracking device in his knife which he had given to her earlier. Barney's apparent death opened a sealed file which states there is an eyewitness that could identify Ocelot.

Ocelot plans to provoke World War III by letting the nuclear warheads explode in the Russian Far East, transporting them on a ship disguised as an American aircraft carrier. As the Expendables and Marsh board the ship, they are ambushed and taken hostage. Marsh is taken away to negotiate a prisoner-exchange for the eyewitness.

Meanwhile, Christmas travels to Thailand to recruit former Expendable Decha, who has turned towards pacifism but agrees to bring him to the ship to avenge Barney. As Christmas fights his way through the ship, Decha has a change of heart and helps him rescue the rest of the team. They launch an attack on Rahmat's forces, during which Christmas fights and kills him. However, Toll has been severely stabbed and needs immediate medical care.

During the prisoner exchange, Marsh kills the eyewitness, which acknowledges him to be Ocelot. Marsh hopes to profit financially by igniting World War III. While the team leaves on Decha's boat to save Toll, Christmas stays behind to turn the ship around to avoid a global conflict. He confronts Marsh before the latter is killed by Barney, who faked his death by surviving the plane crash. They escape the nuclear explosion and celebrate with the team.

== Cast ==
- Jason Statham as Lee Christmas: The team's knife expert and second in command. As Stallone was looking to pass the franchise's lead on to Statham, he did about 80% of all filming, oversaw post-production, and served as a producer.
- Sylvester Stallone as Barney Ross. Stallone confirmed the film would be his final appearance as Barney Ross, with Statham expecting to take over the series after his departure. Due to this, his role in the film was limited.
- Megan Fox as Agent Gina: A CIA officer and member of the Expendables as well as Christmas' girlfriend.
- Dolph Lundgren as Gunner Jensen: A volatile member of the team, undone by years of combat stress. Lundgren stated his character has been sober for several years now and is on a philosophical soul search.
- Tony Jaa as Decha Unai: A former member of the Expendables.
- Randy Couture as Toll Road: The team's demolitions expert.
- Jacob Scipio as Galan: A new member of the Expendables and son of former member Galgo. Originally, Antonio Banderas was slated to reprise his role as Galgo and his dialogue and character was rewritten into that of Galan when he turned out to be unavailable.
- Levy Tran as Lash: A CIA operator and a new member of the Expendables.
- 50 Cent as Easy Day: A new member of the Expendables and former Army Special Forces operator.
- Iko Uwais as Suarto Rahmat: A mercenary and the secondary antagonist working with Ocelot.
- Andy Garcia as Agent Marsh / Ocelot: A CIA officer who hires the Expendables for contract work.

Additionally, Sheila Shah was cast as Mandy / Adele, alongside Daren Nop as Bok, Rahmats right hand man, and Eddie Hall as a bouncer.

== Production ==
=== Development ===
After The Expendables 3 (2014) underperformed at the box office, the future of the series was left in doubt and production stalled over several years. By November 2014, it was announced the project was being developed with intent to retain its R-rating like the first two films. In December 2016, Sylvester Stallone announced the fourth installment would be the final film in the series, while a scheduled tentative release date was set for 2018. By March 2017, Stallone had left the project and the franchise, due to creative differences over the script and direction for continuing the franchise. In January 2018, after vocal support from other cast members (including Arnold Schwarzenegger), Stallone announced his return to the series with a post to his social media platforms; confirming new developments on the fourth movie.

By August 2020, Vértice Cine announced their involvement as a production studio on the movie, alongside Lionsgate and Millennium Films. They also revealed Patrick Hughes was going to return to the series as director. In November 2020, the president of Millennium Media, Jeffrey Greenstein, stated the studio was continuing to work on The Expendables 4 after various delays within the industry worldwide due to the COVID-19 pandemic. In August 2021, The Hollywood Reporter reported Scott Waugh would be directing the film, replacing Hughes, as well as Statham serving as a producer of the film, while Stallone confirmed his involvement with the project, and The Expendables 4 was the same project as The Expendables: A Christmas Story, previously reported as a spin-off but in fact the film's working-title during development. Stallone further stated production was set to commence in October of that year. According to Dolph Lundgren, the film had a budget of $100 million.

Media Capital Technologies was responsible for co-financing the film.

=== Writing ===
In July 2018, Gregory Poirier announced his role as screenwriter. Production was tentatively scheduled to begin by April 2019, though it wasn't until July of that year Stallone announced he was continuing to work on the script for the project. The script was completed later that year, though negotiations with producers were ongoing. In August 2021, it was announced Spenser Cohen wrote the most recent draft of the script with Max Adams, from a story by Cohen.

=== Casting ===
Over the years, multiple actors reported interest or claimed they were approached to star in a fourth installment. In March 2014, Pierce Brosnan stated he had agreed with producer Avi Lerner to star in a fourth installment. By April of the same year, Sylvester Stallone revealed his first choice for the villain was Jack Nicholson, while mentioning his interest in convincing Clint Eastwood to join the production. According to Jackie Chan, he was approached to star in the film by Stallone but was unsure about having limited screen time in an ensemble film, which is why he had turned down roles in the previous two entries. Dwayne Johnson publicly expressed interest to play a villainous character in a new installment during a 2014 Q&A and reiterated his interest to join the series in 2022. In May 2015, Hulk Hogan claimed he was in talks with Stallone to play the film's main villain.

In June 2020, Jean-Claude Van Damme expressed interest in returning to the franchise, publicly pitching his idea of playing Claude Vilain, the brother to his villain character, Jean Vilain, from The Expendables 2. Despite discontent with how his character was handled in The Expendables 3, Arnold Schwarzenegger proclaimed he was interested in returning to the series if he liked the script. However; on May 29, 2023, Schwarzenegger confirmed he would not be returning to the franchise, citing a general uninterest. While he was not included in the fourth movie, Kellan Lutz proclaimed interest to return in a fifth installment in an Instagram post. On the other hand, Terry Crews, who had starred in all previous films, refused to appear in any new entries after claiming he was sexually assaulted by Stallone's agent, Adam Venit, alleging he was pressured by producer Avi Lerner to drop the case if he wanted to stay in the series.

However, none of the actors mentioned above were subsequently cast, and the cast was announced to include returning stars Sylvester Stallone, Jason Statham, Randy Couture, and Dolph Lundgren, while new cast members were revealed to be Eddie Hall, Curtis "50 Cent" Jackson, Megan Fox, Tony Jaa, Andy García, Sheila Shah, Jacob Scipio and Levy Tran, with Iko Uwais playing the villain.

=== Filming ===
In August 2021, it was stated principal photography would begin in October. Filming officially commenced on September 29, 2021. In October 2021, Stallone announced on social media he had finished filming his scenes for the movie. The film was shot in London and Bulgaria and the Jackie Chan Stunt Team handled stunt choreography. In November 2021, production was shot in Greece, including the city of Thessaloniki. Members of the Greek Armed Forces were used as extras and alleged they were not compensated for their month-long official deployment, despite working overtime. On December 3, 2021, Tony Jaa confirmed filming had wrapped.

=== Post-production ===
The film title had been retitled Expend4bles by June 2023, a name that was widely ridiculed by commentators. (Note: Attributed to multiple sources:) When asked why they chose this title, producer Les Weldon stated it had always been the filmmakers' desire while retaining The Expendables's brand identity.

== Music ==
On April 26, 2023, Guillaume Roussel announced he would be composing the film's score, replacing Brian Tyler from the previous three installments.

=== Track listing ===
Expend4bles
No.	Title	Length
1.	"The New Squad"	2:01
2.	"A Horrible Loss"	2:27
3.	"Here We Go"	1:50
4.	"Introducing Decha"	2:12
5.	"Marsh Runs the Show"	2:40
6.	"Trouble Ahead"	2:14
7.	"Bike, Explosions and Death"	3:13
8.	"Battle on the Deck"	2:12
9.	"The Final Duel"	1:41
10.	"Finding Ocelot"	1:12
11.	"Redemption"	1:57
12.	"Expend4bles Main Theme"	2:43
Total length:		26:22

== Release ==
=== Theatrical ===
Expend4bles was released in mainland China on September 15, 2023, and was theatrically released by Lionsgate Films on September 22, 2023. The film was originally scheduled to be released in 2022.

=== Home media ===
Expend4bles was released for digital platforms on October 13, 2023, followed by a DVD, Blu-ray, and Ultra HD Blu-ray release on November 21, 2023.

=== Marketing ===
In April 2022, the first standee posters for the film were unveiled at CinemaCon. The first teaser trailer footage was released exclusively to the attendees at Lionsgate's presentation at the convention. On June 6, 2023, the first poster for the film was released, with the first trailer releasing a day later. A second trailer advertising the film's R rating was released August 23, 2023.

== Reception ==
=== Box office ===
As of November 5, 2023, Expend4bles has grossed $16.7 million in the United States and Canada, and $34.3 million in other territories, for a worldwide total of $51 million.

In the United States and Canada, Expend4bles was initially projected to gross $15–17 million from 3,518 theaters in its opening weekend. After making $3.1 million on its first day (including $750,000 from Thursday night previews), estimates were lowered, and it went on debut to $8 million, finishing second behind holdover The Nun II. The film fell 69% to $2.5 million in its second weekend, finishing in ninth place.

In China, the film opened to $10.7 million, narrowly finishing first ahead of Chinese crime thriller Dust to Dust.

=== Critical response ===
On the review aggregator website Rotten Tomatoes, 14% of 124 critics' reviews are positive, with an average rating of 3.5/10. The website's consensus reads: "Solid work from Jason Statham and some halfway decent set pieces aren't enough to make up for Expend4bles' lackluster action and cheap-looking effects." Metacritic, which uses a weighted average, assigned the film a score of 30 out of 100, based on 33 critics, indicating "generally unfavorable" reviews. Audiences surveyed by CinemaScore gave the film an average grade of "B–" on an A+ to F scale, the lowest of the series, while those polled at PostTrak gave it a 64% overall positive score.

Owen Gleiberman, writing for Variety, said: "This is true 21st-century trash: a movie in which the action itself is expendable." Referencing the poor CGI effects, Collider wrote Expend4bles was "[o]ften resembling more of a mobile game than a movie"; several reviewers compared it to Hidden Strike, another film by Waugh with similarly bad CGI. Simon Thompson of IGN voiced similar complaints, stating: "the special effects, [...] look either unfinished or just so bad that it's sad, [...] like they were ripped from the graphics package of a mid-to-low-budget video game from the early 2000s".

The acting, plot, dialogue, and violence were criticized by various reviewers. Thompson called the "clunky and uninspired dialogue" awful, concluding the film was overall a "crushing disappointment that lacks any of the nostalgia, charisma, and charm that made the franchise appealing". Todd McCarthy of Deadline criticized saying the movie was lazily executed, feeling especially the final battle was an exact copy of Meg 2, another 2023 action film starring Statham.

Furthermore, multiple reviews criticized the overall weak cast in comparison to its predecessors, with many noting the movie hardly retains the franchise's original selling point of featuring an all-star cast of action legends. A review in Paste noted "Statham opts to accept a promotion to series lead" but added "Refashioning The Expendables into a Statham star vehicle only highlights the wrong kind of expendability from many of his long-time costars; why can't we just watch our man kick ass on his own or in various duos?"

An otherwise negative review at /Film conceded, however, the film might be the best of the franchise, while a review from Digital Spy stated while "the sense of cheesy throwback fun is restored in both the gleefully violent action and the script... It's absolutely not enough to save a movie that is two-thirds boring, but it does at least elevate The Expendables 4 above the irredeemable third movie. You'll be left on such an adrenaline high that you wouldn't be surprised if – like the aforementioned STI – the Expendables will be back for another round."

=== Accolades ===
Award / Film Festival	Date of ceremony	Category	Recipient(s)	Result	Ref.
Golden Raspberry Awards	March 9, 2024	Worst Picture	Kevin King-Templeton, Les Weldon, Yariv Lerner, and Jason Statham	Nominated	
Golden Raspberry Awards	March 9, 2024	Worst Director	Scott Waugh	Nominated	
Golden Raspberry Awards	March 9, 2024	Worst Supporting Actor	Sylvester Stallone	Won	
Golden Raspberry Awards	March 9, 2024	Worst Supporting Actress	Megan Fox	Won	
Golden Raspberry Awards	March 9, 2024	Worst Screenplay	Kurt Wimmer, Tad Daggerhart, Max Adams, and Spenser Cohen	Nominated	
Golden Raspberry Awards	March 9, 2024	Worst Screen Couple	Any two "Merciless Mercenaries"	Nominated	
Golden Raspberry Awards	March 9, 2024	Worst Prequel, Remake, Rip-off or Sequel	Expend4bles	Nominated	
