= The Expendables 2 =

2012 American action film by Simon West

- Theatrical release poster
- Directed by: Simon West
- Screenplay by: Sylvester Stallone; Richard Wenk
- Story by: David Agosto; Ken Kaufman; Richard Wenk
- Based on: Characters by David Callaham
- Produced by: Avi Lerner; Danny Lerner; Kevin King Templeton; Les Weldon
- Starring: Sylvester Stallone; Jason Statham; Jet Li; Dolph Lundgren; Chuck Norris; Jean-Claude Van Damme; Bruce Willis; Arnold Schwarzenegger; Terry Crews; Randy Couture; Liam Hemsworth; Scott Adkins; Amanda Ooms; Charisma Carpenter
- Cinematography: Shelly Johnson
- Edited by: Todd E. Miller
- Music by: Brian Tyler
- Production companies: Millennium Films; Nu Image
- Distributed by: Lionsgate
- Release dates: August 13, 2012 (London); August 17, 2012 (United States)
- Running time: 103 minutes
- Country: United States
- Language: English
- Budget: $100 million
- Box office: $315 million

The Expendables 2 is a 2012 American action film directed by Simon West, written by Richard Wenk and Sylvester Stallone, who also starred in the lead role. The film is based on a story by Ken Kaufman, David Agosto and Wenk. Brian Tyler returned to score the film. It is the sequel to The Expendables (2010), and is the second installment in The Expendables franchise. The film co-stars an ensemble cast of largely action film actors; in addition to Stallone, Jason Statham, Jet Li, Dolph Lundgren, Randy Couture, Terry Crews, Bruce Willis and Arnold Schwarzenegger reprise their roles from the first film, with Liam Hemsworth, Yu Nan, Scott Adkins, Chuck Norris and Jean-Claude Van Damme appearing in new roles. In the film, The Expendables undertake a mission which evolves into a quest for revenge against rival mercenary Jean Vilain, who murders one of their own men and threatens the world with a deadly secret weapon.

Principal photography took place over 14 weeks (beginning in September 2011) on an estimated $100 million budget. Film locations included Bulgaria, Hong Kong and New Orleans. Controversy arose over the accidental death of a stuntman and environmental damage caused during filming in Bulgaria.

The film was released in Europe on August 16, 2012, and in North America the following day. The Expendables 2 grossed $315 million worldwide, with its greatest success outside North America. Critics generally considered the film an improvement over its predecessor due to its increased use of humor and action sequences, but its plot and dialogues received criticism. A tie-in downloadable video game was released on July 31, 2012 as a prequel to the events of the film. A sequel titled The Expendables 3 was released on August 15, 2014.

== Plot ==
The Expendables are sent to Nepal to rescue a Chinese businessman who has been captured by Nepalese militia. The mercenary team includes leader Barney Ross, blade expert Lee Christmas, martial artist Yin Yang, weapons specialist Hale Caesar, demolitions expert Toll Road, the unstable Gunner Jensen, and sniper Billy "The Kid," the group's youngest and newest member. They rescue the businessman and the captured Trent Mauser, Ross's rival. Yang leaves the group to escort the businessman back to China.

After returning to New Orleans, Billy tells Barney that he intends to retire at the end of the month and live with his girlfriend, Sophia. Later, Barney is forced to accept a mission from CIA operative Mr. Church to retrieve an item from a downed airplane in Albania. Church sends technical expert Maggie Chan with the team. In Albania, the Expendables retrieve the item but are ambushed by international criminal and arms dealer Jean Vilain, his right-hand man Hector, and his criminal group, the Sangs, who capture Billy and demand the item in exchange for Billy's life. The team gives up the item, but Vilain betrays them by kicking a knife through Billy's heart and flees with the Sangs by helicopter. Barney recovers a note for Sophia from Billy's body; the team buries their fallen comrade, swearing vengeance on Vilain.

Maggie tells them that the item is a computer, with the location of 5 tons of refined weapons-grade plutonium in a mine abandoned by the Soviet Union after the Cold War. Vilain intends to retrieve, then sell, the plutonium on the black market. The Expendables managed to track the computer's signal and follow Vilain, which leads them to Bulgaria, where they stay overnight at an abandoned USSR military base. The next morning, the Expendables are ambushed by the Sangs and a tank. After the team run out of ammunition, they are saved by Barney's old friend, Booker, who quickly eliminates both the Sangs and the tank. Before he departs, Booker informs the group of nearby villagers who oppose Vilain. Meanwhile, Hector and Vilain dig up the plutonium and begin collecting it.

In the village, the Expendables find armed women guarding their children from Vilain's forces. The women ask for help because local men are being captured and forced into slavery in the mine, never to return. The Sangs arrive to gather villagers but are ambushed and killed by the Expendables. The team locates Vilain and the mine and attack with their plane, which they crash through the adit to gain entry. They rescue the enslaved miners, but Vilain and Hector escape with plutonium. Vilain detonates charges, causing the mine to collapse and trap both the miners and the Expendables.

Church and Trench arrive, freeing the miners and the team, and join the Expendables to pursue Vilain. The group intercepts Vilain and his men at an airport as he prepares to leave by plane. Joined again by Booker, the Expendables, Trench, and Church engage the Sangs in battle. Christmas decapitates Hector while Barney and Vilain fight hand-to-hand. Barney defeats and stabs Vilain, killing him.

In the aftermath, Barney is given an old Antonov An-2 biplane by Church; Church, Maggie, Booker, and Trench part ways with the team. In France, Sophia discovers a box with a large sum of money and Billy's letter on her doorstep. As the Expendables depart on the plane, they make a final toast to Billy.

== Cast ==
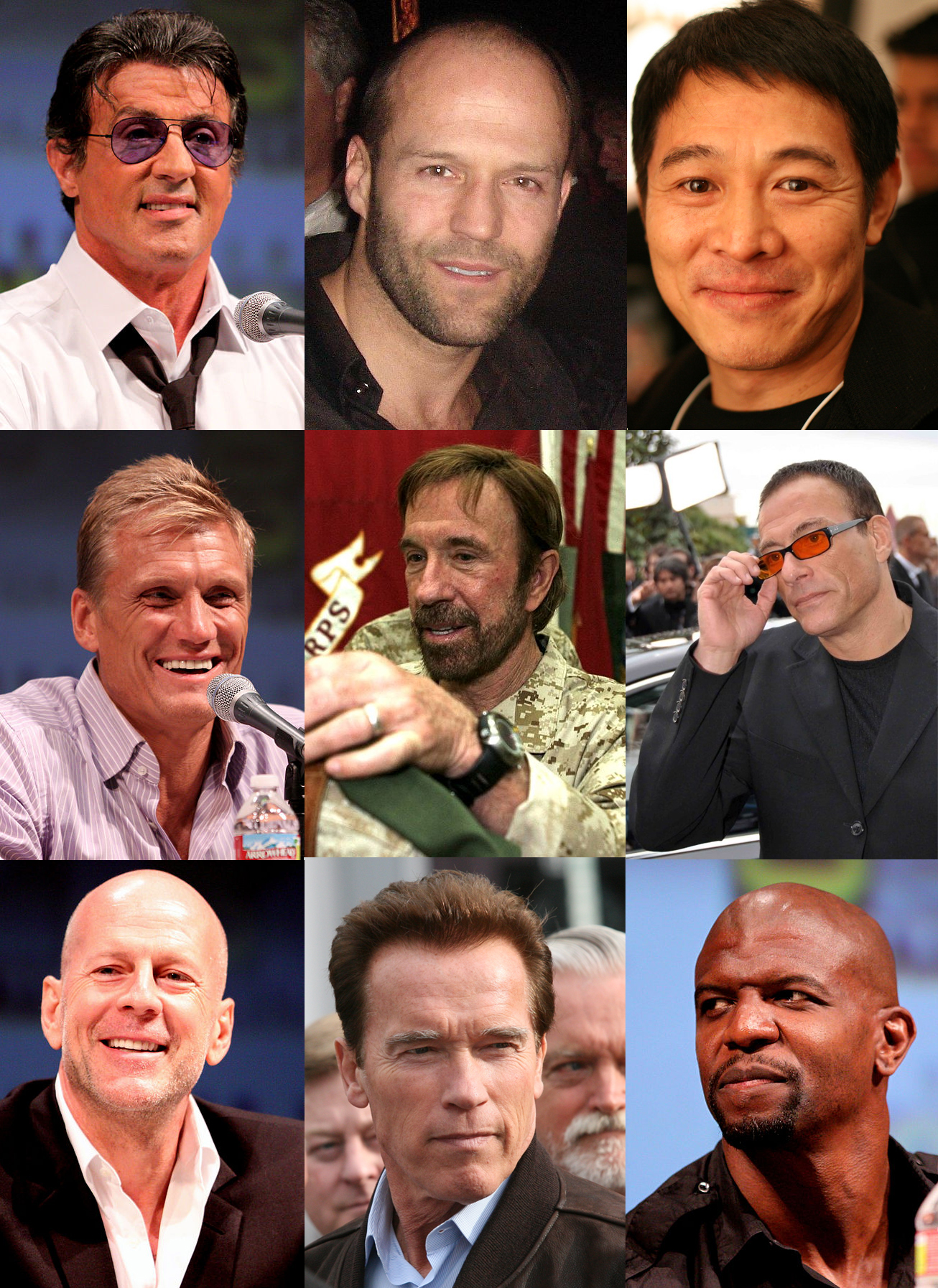
Ensemble cast of action stars, including (left to right) Sylvester Stallone, Jason Statham, Jet Li, Dolph Lundgren, Chuck Norris, Jean-Claude Van Damme, Bruce Willis, Arnold Schwarzenegger and Terry Crews

- Sylvester Stallone as Barney Ross:
  The Expendables' leader, who was USAF pilot and Marine before becoming a mercenary. Stallone insisted on performing his own stunts, ignoring his doctor's advice after several surgeries to repair a broken back and neck injury he received while filming The Expendables.
- Jason Statham as Lee Christmas:
  The team's knife expert and former SAS soldier. Statham described his character as "kind of a workingman's hero… a guy you'd want to go out and have a beer with."
- Jet Li as Yin Yang:
  The Expendables' hand-to-hand combat expert. Schedule conflicts with Flying Swords of Dragon Gate meant Li could only participate in the film's opening.
- Dolph Lundgren as Gunner Jensen:
  A volatile member of the team with degree in chemical engineering, undone by years of combat stress and drugs abuse. Lundgren's personal history (including his chemical engineering degree) were incorporated into the character's story by Stallone. Lundgren was hesitant to participate in the film based on the first script draft; however, rewrites and additional content for his character changed his mind.
- Chuck Norris as Booker:
  A retired military operative on a mission to save his old teammates. The character's name is an homage to the 1978 action film Good Guys Wear Black, where Norris plays John T. Booker. During the film, Booker claims to have been bitten by a cobra and states that the cobra later died as a result; this is a reference to Chuck Norris facts, satirical factoids about the actor.
- Randy Couture as Toll Road:
  The team's demolitions expert and former wrestler. Couture described his character as "the glue that holds all of these dysfunctional guys together".
- Terry Crews as Hale Caesar:
  The Expendables' barrel-weapons specialist.
- Liam Hemsworth as Billy the Kid:
  An ex-SASR sniper, disenchanted after service in Afghanistan. Hemsworth was confirmed for the role on September 19, 2011. He was cast in The Expendables in a similar role as a different character, but his role was written out of the script. Stallone remained in contact with him, offering him a role in the sequel when production began. Stallone described the character as the next generation of the Expendables, who is not as "cynical as the other team members".
- Yu Nan as Maggie:
  Maggie Chan is CIA agent working for Church who teams with the Expendables to retrieve the lost safe.
- Jean-Claude Van Damme as Vilain:
  The leader of an opposing team of mercenaries known as the Sangs, ex-soldier of French Foreign Legion. Van Damme was intentionally distant from the cast and crew during filming to stay in character. Commenting on the role, Stallone said: "We'll have a big showdown between me and Van Damme, which has been anticipated for a long time, so it should be a good one." Van Damme was offered a role in The Expendables, but ultimately turned it down.
- Bruce Willis as Church:
  A secretive CIA agent. In late August 2010, Stallone expressed an interest in having Willis return in the sequel (expanding upon his brief cameo in the original) as a potential "super-villain". Willis was confirmed in a "substantial" role on September 6, 2011, saying, "Hopefully, they'll start shooting it while we're young enough to survive."
- Arnold Schwarzenegger as Trench:
  Ross' arch-rival (and occasional ally). Stallone intended to have Schwarzenegger return for a sequel before the release of The Expendables: "If this works, I would love to get him in the next one". Schwarzenegger's involvement was confirmed on September 6, 2011, his "substantial" role expanding a cameo appearance in the original film. He filmed his scenes in four days.
- Scott Adkins as Hector:
  Vilain's right-hand man. Adkins was offered a role in the original film, but turned it down for Undisputed III: Redemption.

The cast is rounded out by Charisma Carpenter (reprising her role as Christmas's girlfriend, Lacy), Swedish actress Amanda Ooms as Pilar, opposition leader in the enslaved village, and Nikolette Noel as Billy's wife. Bulgarian mixed martial artist Lyubomir Simeonov has a cameo as one of the Sangs. Tennis pro Novak Djokovic filmed a cameo as himself (after being invited to participate by producer Avi Lerner), but his scenes were cut from the film.

At several stages of development, other actors were pursued for the film. In October 2010, Willis said that Steve Austin would reprise his role as villain Dan Paine. In November 2010, Charlie Sheen was reported to be in consideration for the role of a CIA agent hunting down Willis' Mr. Church. In August 2011, Variety reported that actor and martial artist Donnie Yen was offered a role in the film; however, Yen declined the role because he did not find it intriguing.

In September 2011, Stallone confirmed that he was in talks with Nicolas Cage and John Travolta, and scheduling would be the only obstacle to their involvement. In July 2011, Mickey Rourke was stated to be reprising his role as Tool; by late September it was reported that he had dropped out of the film, and on October 18 this was confirmed. Antonio Banderas was reportedly offered a role, but was unable to participate due to other commitments. Jackie Chan said he had been offered a role, but was forced to turn it down due to scheduling conflicts with CZ12.

On his approach to casting, Stallone said that he was looking for actors who had not experienced recent success in film: "I like using people that had a moment and then maybe have fallen on some hard times and give them another shot. So we're always looking for actors like Michael Biehn and Michael Paré. I like those kinds of guys. Someone did it for me and I like to see if I can do it for them."

== Production ==
=== Development ===
Plans for a sequel to The Expendables were in place before the film's release in August 2010; Stallone said, "I have an idea ready to go...I'm going to try to do something that's quite radical". In an interview in August 2010 he noted that he did not have a new script yet, but "It's plotted out in my mind's eye." On April 18, 2011, Stallone confirmed that he would not be repeating his directing duties in The Expendables, making a list of directors to serve as his replacement. In April 2011, the film was given a scheduled release date of August 17, 2012 and a teaser poster for the film was released at the 2011 Cannes Film Festival. In June 2011, Simon West was confirmed as director.

In August 2011, it was reported that Nu Image/Millennium Films was in negotiations with an unnamed Chinese distributor. The distributor would produce the film, in exchange for a Chinese actor (Donnie Yen) being cast and filming in China. The partnership was considered to make a Chinese release of the film easier, and would have granted Millennium Films a larger share of its Chinese revenue. However, the partnership fell apart before production began. However, another Chinese studio, Le Vision Pictures, invested in the film. Lionsgate Films purchased the North American and United Kingdom distribution rights to the film for $35 million.

On January 19, 2012, Stallone stated that the film was being aimed at a PG-13 audience. Unlike the first film (which was restricted to viewers over age 17), this would have made the sequel available to all viewers over 13 years of age (and younger children, with parental consent). The reported change received a negative reception. Speaking to Ain't It Cool News about the change, Stallone said "The PG-13 rumor is true, but before your readers pass judgement, trust me when I say this film is large in every way and delivers on every level." It was reported that the change was requested by Norris before he would take part in the film, because he did not appreciate the swearing in the script. However, these plans for a more family-friendly rating did not succeed and the finished film was rated R. When the adult-oriented rating was confirmed shortly before release, West stated that "the shooting style and the dialogue, from day one, it was R-rated." However, the visual effects supervisor said that The Expendables 2 was shot as a PG-13 film, with all bullet wounds being dust-hits. Once it was decided that the film would be R-rated, blood, decapitations, eviscerations and severed limbs were digitally added in post-production.

Van Damme redesigned his final fight with Stallone, with the latter's approval. Van Damme was unhappy with the scripted fight, which had his character running away and only a brief confrontation between the pair. He felt that the audience wanted a longer fight scene between the two actors.

=== Filming ===
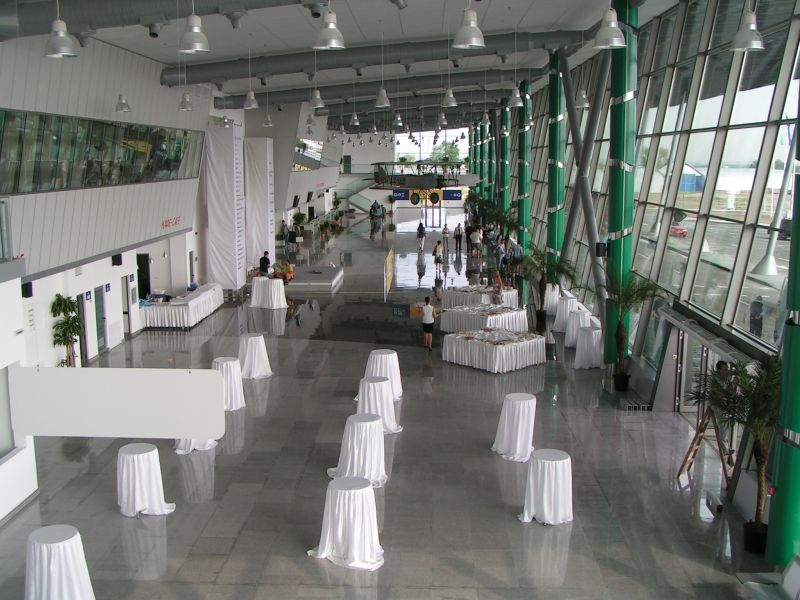
Plovdiv Airport was the background for one of the film's largest action scenes (including the terminal).

On a budget of $100 million, principal photography of The Expendables 2 began on September 29, 2011, and lasted 14 weeks. Filming took place largely in Bulgaria: at the Nu Boyana Film studio in Sofia, the city of Plovdiv and the town of Bansko. One of the film's larger set pieces took place at Bulgaria's second-largest airport (in Plovdiv), including gunfights, explosions and car chases throughout the terminal. On October 27, 2011, while the second-unit stunt team was filming at the Ognyanovo Reservoir 15 miles (24 km) from Sofia, stuntman Kun Liu was killed and another (Nuo Sun), was critically injured in a staged explosion on a rubber boat. Sun underwent a five-hour operation, which left him in stable condition.

Filming also took place at Devetashka Cave in Lovech Province. As part of the cave shoot, BGN600,000 ($408,762) was spent rebuilding a 114 metres (125 yd) bridge from the cave over the Osam River; only the concrete bridge columns remained from the original structure. Nu Boyana Film Studios announced that the bridge would remain after filming, as a gift to Bulgaria.

Other filming locations included Hong Kong and New Orleans, and filming was completed by December 25, 2011. On February 9, 2012, it was reported that The Expendables 2 was in post-production.

=== Visual effects ===
Digital effects were used extensively throughout the film to replace vehicles, achieve stunts and completely reshape the Bulgarian landscape to fit the individual needs of each scene. (0:28)

The Expendables 2 contains approximately 1,547 digital effect shots. The main effects studio was Worldwide FX (WWFX), which produced 1,186 of the shots, and a further 800 shots which were discarded in response to changes to the film's story. Several other studios, including El Ranchito, Malditochrome, Tata Elxsi, Reliance Mediaworks, and R-Team, also produced effects shots for the film through WWFX. Digital effect pre-production began in July 2011 and was completed one year later. WWFX's primary facility is situated in Sofia, allowing them to have constant access to the production, and model assets of the sets before their practical versions were built; this enabled WWFX to raise issues relating to the designs early and develop an optimised construction plan. Anything that was considered to potentially need a computer generated double was photographed and digitally modeled even if it was not scheduled to appear in the film, which later served useful as the film's story was adjusted, requiring WWFX to rebuild entire scenes.

Several sets were rendered digitally, and almost all of the sets had some form of digital enhancement. The largest digital environment was the Devetashka cave, which had to be digitally recreated because of the environmental concerns of filming explosions in the real cave. Using over 5,000 photographs taken at different times of day, the cave was accurately illuminated and rendered down to crevices and moss. The cave's interior containing a concealed nuclear vault was subjected to several changes up to two months before the effects' delivery date based on editorial input, including modifications to its scale. The railcar used within the cave was also digitally built alongside a practical version, but the digital versions versatility saw it largely replace its practical counterpart. The scene featuring the Expendables and prisoners trapped in the cave were shot entirely on Chroma key with the cave background inserted later.

The entire opening sequence of the film was shot in Bulgaria during the winter, but was meant to take place in tropical South Asia. Digital effects were used to remove the snow and deciduous trees present and replace them with tropical flora. The alterations required over 340 shots alone. The scene was further complicated by Jet Li's scheduling conflict, which meant the interior sets had to be shipped to Hong Kong, reassembled and shot with him there, and the exterior sets had to be digitally built and then merged with footage of Li shot on Chroma key. A fish tank in the opening was filled with digital eels based on South Asian river eels, but increased in size by three times, after the real fish died and sank to the bottom. The finale in the airport was another complex digital environment, shot in three entirely differently locations in two seasons, which were then merged to create one seamless location. When the trucks break through glass to exit the airport, the scene is entirely digital and was filmed on Chroma screens in the middle of Sofia. Numerous digital matte paintings were used to modify the winter Bulgarian terrain in different scenes to represent its intended location.

Vehicles also received digital enhancement. For the scene in which the Expendables crash their Canadair CL-215 amphibious plane into a cave, the effects team intended to use Miniature effects, filming using a 1/3 scale model of the 90-feet wing span plane. Production constraints and the limited shooting schedule meant the miniature shoot was abandoned and the entire sequence was rendered digitally. The plane itself was also digitally modified, adding a nose-mounted gun which in practice could have stalled the engine with its recoil. A rear hatch door was required for jet skis to drive into the plane, but the craft's design made such a door impractical; visual trickery was used to obscure this fact and make the door fit into the existing plane design. A helicopter used in the opening sequence was required to perform more dynamic moves, and so it was digitally removed entirely and replaced with a digital recreation that better fit the scene's requirements. The helicopter which decapitates Hector during his fight with Christmas had no rotors, and they were digitally added. WWFX later enhanced it more, modifying lighting and stabilizing the helicopter's body which shook unnaturally when struck during the fight. The Sangs Mi-8 helicopter was a civilian variant, but it was digitally replaced with the gunship variant, the Hip-E, to make it look meaner and more fitting for Van Damme's villainous mercenary, with a black reflective coating and armaments. The T-72 tank used to assault the Expendables would have devastated the set with the resulting concussive wave if it had fired a single shot, so it was replaced in most shots with a digital version that performed the shooting.

=== Controversy ===
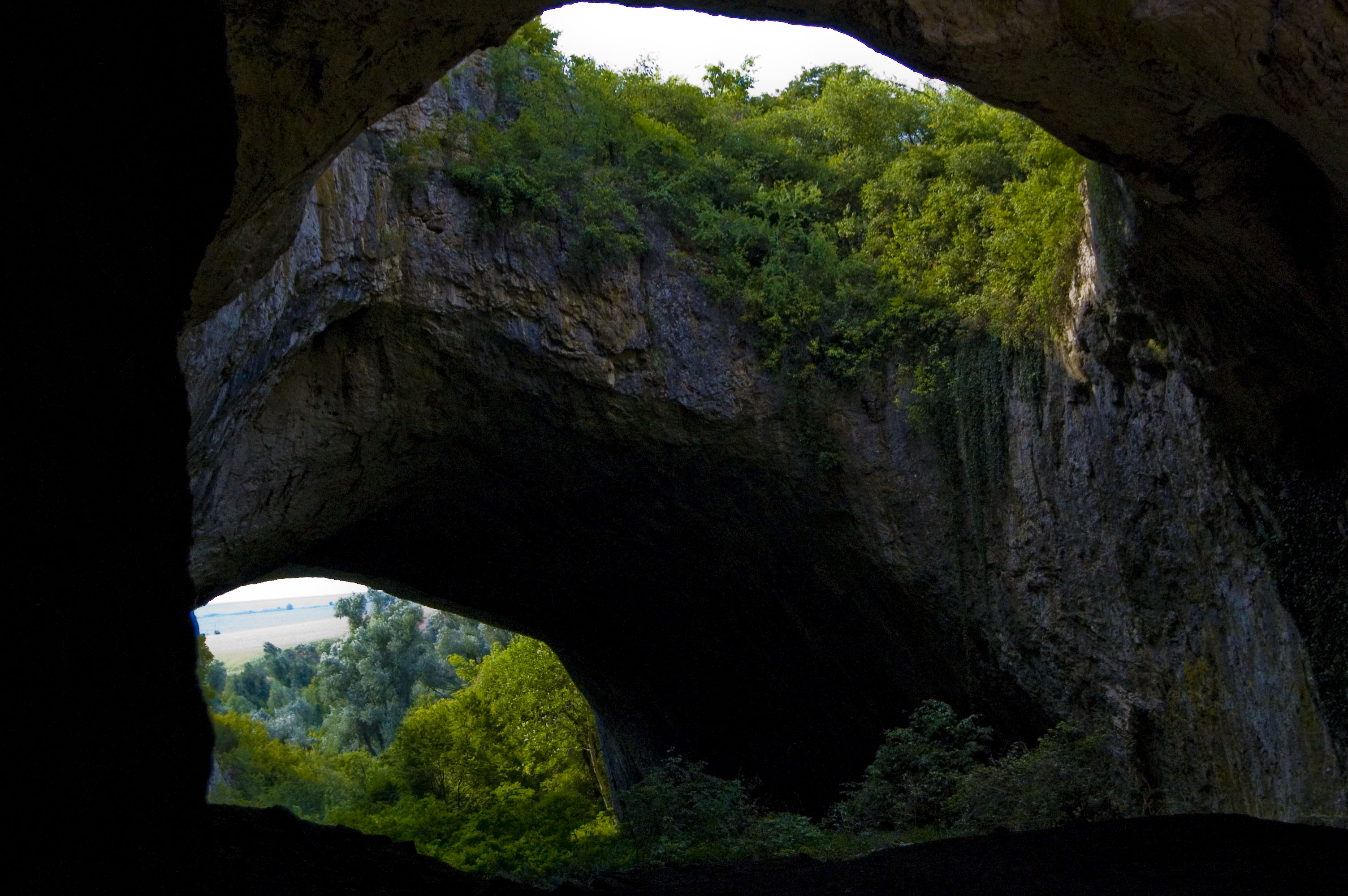
Devetashka Cave in 2009

On November 16, 2011, the production received a fine (between $343–$3,440) from the Bulgarian environmental protection agency for unlawfully removing shrubs and small trees from the entrance of Devetashka Cave. Although permits had been obtained allowing sets to be built in the area (including a bridge to the cave), environmentalists complained that filming could damage the cave (home to about 40 endangered species). To avoid further problems, the producers agreed not to film explosions, car chases and fires near the cave.

However, later that month Bulgarian environmentalists stated that the bat population in the cave had been reduced by up to 75% (from about 30,000 in 2010 to 8,000 in 2011). Nikolay Simov of the Center for Bat Studies and Protection at the Bulgarian Academy of Sciences blamed The Expendables 2's production for the reduction. On January 16, 2012, the Veliko Tarnovo Appellate Prosecutor's Office overturned a ruling by its Lovech equivalent to prevent an investigation of what environmentalists stated to be an "excessive" number of dead bats found in the cave after filming (including several endangered species). The European Commission became involved, contacting the Bulgarian Ministry of Environment and Waters for information about the dead bats; the Bulgarian Ministry and the Bulgarian Academy of Sciences conducted their own probe, stating that the bat kill was within normal parameters. The Veliko Tarnovo Appellate stated that the Lovech Environmental Ministry failed to investigate violations made by The Expendables 2's crew. On February 23, 2012, a Bulgarian court ruled that the crew had violated its filming license.

In July 2012 the family of Kun Liu (the stuntman killed during filming) filed a wrongful death suit against the producers of the film, Nu Image and Millennium Films, and stunt coordinator Chad Stahelski. The suit alleged that conditions for the stunt were unsafe. The Expendables 2 credits contain a dedication to Liu's memory.

== Music ==
Brian Tyler composed the score for The Expendables 2, who scored the original film. His score combined percussion and electronic elements with orchestral music, and was released as the 14-track album The Expendables 2: Original Motion Picture Soundtrack by Lionsgate Records on iTunes on August 14, 2012. Several popular songs also appear in the film, including "The Wanderer" by Dion DiMucci, "Mustang Sally" by Mack Rice, "Crystal Blue Persuasion" by Tommy James & the Shondells, "Groovin'" and "Beautiful Morning" by The Young Rascals, "Rip It Up" by Little Richard, "I Just Want to Celebrate" by Rare Earth, and "You Don't Want to Fight with Me" by Stallone's younger brother Frank Stallone. Empire's Danny Graydon awarded the soundtrack a score of 4 out of 5, and said "Tyler's action fare is, as ever, superbly judged, mixing real thrills with some dramatic weight... resulting in a score that is affectionately nostalgic and not riddled with cliché." Graydon singled out the pieces "Party Crashers" and "Track 'Em Find 'Em Kill 'Em" for praise.

== Release ==
=== Theatrical ===
The film premiered on August 8, 2012, in Madrid, Spain, followed by premieres in Paris on August 9, London on August 13 and Hollywood on August 15. The film was first released on August 16, 2012, with its North American release the following day.

=== Home media ===
The Expendables 2 was released on DVD, Blu-ray Disc, and digital download on November 20, 2012. The Blu-ray disc edition contains the theatrical cut of The Expendables 2, a DVD and digital copy of the film and supplemental material including a director's commentary, deleted scenes, a gag reel, and four featurettes about the film: Gods of War: Assembling Earth's Mightiest Anti-Heroes; Big Guns, Bigger Heroes: The 1980s and the Rise of the Action Film; On the Assault: The Real-Life Weaponry of The Expendables and Guns for Hire: The Real Expendables. The Blu-ray disc version is the first film release to support the 11.1-channel DTS Neo:X sound format.

On September 9, 2023, the film was made available in the Philippines for streaming on YouTube without charge by Viva Films to promote the upcoming release of Expend4bles, slated for release in the country on September 20.

== Reception ==
=== Box office ===
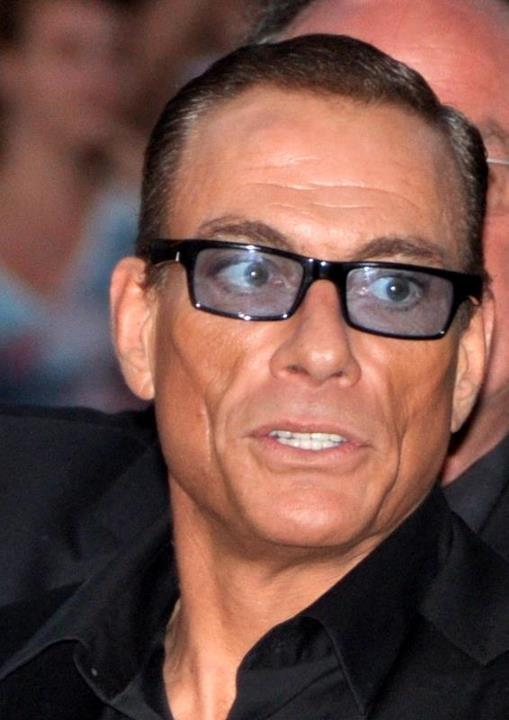
Jean-Claude Van Damme in Paris at the film's French premiere in August 2012

The Expendables 2 earned $85 million in North America and $230 million (73%) in other territories, for a worldwide total of $315 million. This made it the 25th-highest-grossing film of 2012.

In the week before its release, North American pre-release tracking estimated that the film would gross between $30–$38 million, making it the number-one film during its opening weekend. Other tracking showed that up to 17% of North American audiences were reluctant to visit cinemas following the mass shooting in a Colorado cinema in late July 2012, which might affect ticket sales. The Expendables 2 earned $10.5 million on its opening day; during its opening weekend, the film earned $28.59 million in 3,316 theaters (an average of $8,622 per theater) finishing as the weekend's number-one film. The gross was 18% lower than The Expendables' $34.8 million opening in 2010. The largest demographic for its opening weekend was male (63%) over age 25 (65%). During its second weekend, the movie held the number-one spot with $13.4 million. By its third weekend, analysis showed that the film's gross had fallen behind the original at the same time in its release by $16 million.

Outside North America the film grossed $24.7 million during its opening weekend (August 17–19) in 18 markets, including Italy ($1.9 million), Mexico, Russia ($8 million) and the United Kingdom ($3 million). The following weekend (August 24–26) it expanded to a total of 36 markets—including France ($6.1 million), Spain ($2.3 million) and India ($1.8 million)—and grossed approximately $25.9 million to remain the number-one film. The film also had successful September opening weekends in Germany ($4.2 million), Brazil ($3.7 million) and Australia ($3.1 million). Over the September 14–16 weekend, the film's total gross increased to $186 million, outperforming the original film's $171 million. The film was also successful in China, where it grossed approximately $54 million in its first 35 days—making it the eighth-highest-grossing film of 2012 in the country and outperforming The Dark Knight Rises ($52.5 million) and The Amazing Spider-Man ($48.5 million).

=== Critical response ===
On the review aggregator website Rotten Tomatoes the film garnered an approval rating of 68% based on 133 reviews, with an average rating of 5.9/10. The site's critical consensus reads, "Taut, violent, and suitably self-deprecating, The Expendables 2 gives classic action fans everything they can reasonably expect from a star-studded shoot-'em-up — for better and for worse." Metacritic gave it a weighted average score of 51 out of 100, based on 28 critics, indicating "mixed or average reviews". CinemaScore polls reported that moviegoers gave the film an average grade of "A−" on an A+ to F scale, an improvement over the first film's "B+".

Boxoffice's Amy Nicholson compared the film to Fast Five as an "over-the-top sequel [that] caters to the lowest common denominator in the best possible way", appreciating the characters' unique facets and the use of references from the actors' other films. Of the action scenes, Nicholson said "they're glorious nonsense, a guns-blazing bullet barrage". The Hollywood Reporter's Justin Lowe called the film "taut, humorous and attractively packaged". Lowe considered Schwarzenegger's brief role to have the most memorable dialogue, noting that he stole any scene in which he was present. On West's direction and cinematographer Shelly Johnson, he said "the action choreography never disappoints". Variety's Justin Chang appreciated the self-referential humor in each actor's film history and the violent action scenes; however, he felt the scenes were undermined by poor editing and a "grimy" visual scheme throughout the film. Chang commented that the "thrill" of seeing all the actors on screen mitigated plot issues.

Entertainment Weekly's Lisa Schwarzbaum said West's action direction improved upon the previous film's direction by Stallone. Schwarzbaum considered that the film is "excellent crap, fine junk, an exercise in campy movie nostalgia", commenting that while she did not consider the film artistic, she found it enjoyable. USA Today's Claudia Puig considered the shift from the serious tone of the original to an emphasis on humor to be entertaining. Puig said the film was "corny, barbaric and sometimes visually murky. But humor and self-deprecating macho charm make this male pattern badness crowd-pleasing fun." The New York Times' Neil Genzlinger judged the film "pleasantly-dumb fun if you watch with the right mindset", but considered its dialog "embarrassing" (if intended seriously) and the plot formulaic. Rolling Stone's Peter Travers gave the film two (out of four) stars, saying that the film was not even "big, dumb fun" and criticizing the script; it did not "so much defy credulity as bludgeon it to death."

The Daily Telegraph's Robbie Collin gave the film three (out of five) stars. He appreciated the use of stunts and special effects over computerized effects, stating that it "gives proceedings a flame-grilled authenticity". Collin added, "I was thoroughly appalled, mainly at myself for enjoying it." Empire's Nick de Semlyen was more critical, labeling it a "huge, bulging disappointment". Semlyen criticized the plot and what he judged an overuse of references, set pieces and dialogue from the cast's filmography without creating memorable moments of its own. Semlyen praised Van Damme's "grandstanding, plutonium-crazed baddie" and Lundgren's "action-troll" as high points. The Village Voice's Nick Pinkerton found the violence creative, but said that the film was negatively impacted by self-referencing, "joyless one-line nods" and "outright cash-in cynicism" (referring to cameo appearances by some of the actors).

=== Accolades ===
The Expendables 2 received a nomination for Summer 2012 Blockbuster Trailer at the 2012 Golden Trailer Awards; and Best Graphics in a TV Spot, Best Action Poster, and Best Film Festival Poster the following year. Tyler won BMI Film Music Awards at the 2013 BMI Film & TV Awards. (Note: Also for Iron Man 3 (2013) and the television series Hawaii Five-0)

== Sequel ==
A sequel titled The Expendables 3 began filming in August 2013. The film sees the return of several cast members and the addition of new ones including Wesley Snipes, Antonio Banderas, Harrison Ford, and Mel Gibson. The Expendables 3 was released theatrically in the United States on August 15, 2014.

== Video games ==
The Expendables 2 Videogame is a downloadable four-player cooperative shoot 'em up video game. It was published by Ubisoft for PC, PlayStation Network (PSN) and Xbox Live Arcade (XBLA) and released on July 31, 2012, for PSN and August 20 for PC (via Steam) and XBLA. The game's plot is a prequel to The Expendables 2, with Barney Ross, Gunner Jensen, Yin Yang and Hale Caesar appearing as playable characters. Lundgren and Crews voiced their respective characters. According to review aggregators Metacritic and GameRankings, the game received generally negative reviews. The Expendables 2: Deploy & Destroy is a single-player tower defense, real-time strategy online game. Published by Roadshow Films and Soap Creative, the game was released on July 13, 2012. Its plot was derived from village scenes in the film, where players can choose their squad from the cast, set up defences and battle the enemy.
