= List of The Expendables characters =

This is a list of characters in The Expendables franchise.

== Appearances ==
| Character | Films | | | |
| Character | The Expendables | The Expendables 2 | The Expendables 3 | Expend4bles |
The Expendables
| Barney Ross | Sylvester Stallone | Sylvester Stallone | Sylvester Stallone | Sylvester Stallone |
| Lee Christmas | Jason Statham | Jason Statham | Jason Statham | Jason Statham |
| Yin Yang | Jet Li | Jet Li | Jet Li | |
| Gunner Jensen | Dolph Lundgren | Dolph Lundgren | Dolph Lundgren | Dolph Lundgren |
| Toll Road | Randy Couture | Randy Couture | Randy Couture | Randy Couture |
| Hale Caesar | Terry Crews | Terry Crews | Terry Crews | |
| Billy "The Kid" Timmons | | Liam Hemsworth | | |
| Galgo | | | Antonio Banderas | |
| Doctor "Doc" Death | | | Wesley Snipes | |
| John Smilee | | | Kellan Lutz | |
| Luna Maya | | | Ronda Rousey | |
| Thorn | | | Glen Powell | |
| Mars | | | Victor Ortiz | |
| Easy Day | | | | Curtis "50 Cent" Jackson |
| Decha Unai | | | | Tony Jaa |
| Galan | | | | Jacob Scipio |
| Lash | | | | Levy Tran |
Supporting Characters
| Trent "Trench" Mauser | Arnold Schwarzenegger | Arnold Schwarzenegger | Arnold Schwarzenegger | |
| Lacy | Charisma Carpenter | Charisma Carpenter | | |
| Tool | Mickey Rourke | | | |
| Sandra Garza | Giselle Itié | | | |
| Booker "The Lone Wolf" | | Chuck Norris | | |
| Pilar | | Amanda Ooms | | |
| Bonaparte | | | Kelsey Grammer | |
CIA Members
| Agent Church | Bruce Willis | Bruce Willis | | |
| Agent Maggie Chan | | Yu Nan | | |
| Agent Max Drummer | | | Harrison Ford | |
| Agent Gina | | | | Megan Fox |
Primary Antagonists
| Agent James Munroe | Eric Roberts | | | |
| Jean Vilain | | Jean-Claude Van Damme | | |
| Conrad Stonebanks | | | Mel Gibson | |
| Agent Marsh / Ocelot | | | | Andy Garcia |
Secondary Antagonists
| Daniel "Dan" Paine | Steve Austin | | | |
| General Garza | David Zayas | | | |
| Lawrence "The Brit" Sparks | Gary Daniels | | | |
| Hector | | Scott Adkins | | |
| Goran Vata | | | Robert Davi | |
| Suarto Rahmat | | | | Iko Uwais |

== Main ==
All the following characters are all shown to be members of the Expendables at some point in the films.

=== Barney Ross ===
Barney Ross, portrayed by Sylvester Stallone, is the leader of the Expendables, who served as USAF pilot and Marine before becoming a mercenary. He is hired by Agent Church in the first film to investigate suspicious activities on the island of Vilena and take out its fanatical dictator, General Garza. Barney considers abandoning the job after finding out that renegade CIA agent James Munroe is using Vilena as a source of narcotics production. However, he is impressed by the courage of Garza's rebellious daughter and ends up taking down both Garza and Munroe. Though Barney completes his assignment, Church wants compensation for the death of Munroe and hires the Expendables in the second film to recover a briefcase containing sensitive information from a downed plane in Albania . Since the case is locked in a booby-trapped safe, Church forces Barney to take hacker Maggie Chan along for the mission. Barney reluctantly accepts and the mission goes off without a hitch. However, Barney's crew is ambushed by arms-dealer Jean Vilain and his gang, the Sangs. Vilain murders Barney's rookie crew member Billy the Kid and takes the briefcase, which contains a computer map revealing the location of five tons of discarded plutonium. Vowing vengeance, Barney and the crew hunt down Vilain. After a one-on-one battle at an airport, Barney kills Vilain.

In the third film, Barney and his crew, now reinforced by veteran member Doctor Death, are sent to take down an arms dealer who turns out to be Expendables co-founder Conrad Stonebanks. The mission ends in disaster and Hale Caesar is severely injured. Barney is tasked by CIA agent Drummer to arrest Stonebanks and deliver him to the Hague for war crimes; Ross subsequently forms a new Expendables team, disbanding the former members. The new team is initially successful, catching Stonebanks during a deal in Poland, but they were captured when Stonebanks' lackeys come to rescue him. Barney initially plans to go after Stonebanks accompanied only by ex-mercenary Galgo, but the old team rejoins him on a mission to take down Stonebanks in Asmenistan. Barney confronts Stonebanks on the floor level of a demolished hotel in a fist fight that ends with Barney fatally shooting Stonebanks and narrowly escaping the collapsing building.

Barney is very close to his teammates and often worries over their safety, showing great remorse over the death of Billy the Kid and even disbanding his former team after Hale Caesar is hospitalised. He also expresses some regret when it comes to his life choices; when Billy states his intention to retire and live with his girlfriend, Barney shows no ill will towards him and commends his choice, stating that he would likely do the same if given the choice. His signature weapon is a revolver pistol, which he keeps hidden in a holster behind him in order to take targets by surprise, and is also an expert pilot. Barney has an affinity for skulls, which feature prominently in his personal effects. The most notable of these is his lucky ring, which he gives to Hale Caesar while he recovers in hospital.

=== Lee Christmas ===
Lee Christmas, portrayed by Jason Statham, is a former SAS soldier, Barney's closest friend and right-hand man on the Expendables team. Barney frequently trusts Lee with dangerous missions and takes him along on the recon to Vilena. In the first two films, Lee struggles with his commitment to the team and his girlfriend Lacy, whom he initially intends to marry. Lee often questions Barney's decisions but loyally sticks by him regardless. He shows some hostility towards Doctor Death, as they are both expert knife-users. Lee uses throwing knives and can throw them with amazing speed and accuracy, often taking down multiple opponents at the same time; he is also extremely capable in unarmed combat. Lee is constantly the target of good-natured belittling and jokes from other members, especially Barney. He is picked on due to his size, ego, last name (which lends itself to puns) and his accent, which Agent Drummer cannot understand.

=== Galgo ===
Galgo, portrayed by Antonio Banderas, is a former soldier and sharpshooter with the Spanish Legion. He later struggles to find work due to his age, sending many fake resumes to Bonaparte. He meets Barney while the latter is on a recruitment mission to form a new team to take down Conrad Stonebanks, but is rejected. When the new team is captured, Galgo approaches Barney and begs to be allowed to help. Barney agrees and Galgo proves himself useful, despite irritating everyone with his constant talking. Barney eventually deduces that Galgo's incessant chatter is due to survivor's guilt; Galgo then reveals that the other members of his unit were killed during a peacekeeping mission. After Stonebanks' death, Galgo is officially accepted into the Expendables.

Antonio Banderas intentionally played against type in the role of Galgo. Banderas had established himself as a suave and serious Latino lead actor; however, as Galgo he performs exaggerated mannerisms and talks constantly.

=== Yin Yang ===
Yin Yang, portrayed by Jet Li, is another capable unarmed combatant in the team and Kung Fu expert. In the first movie, Yang complains that he should be paid more, due to being smaller than everyone else, and thus having to do more work. He and Gunner are shown to generally dislike one another, although this animosity seems to have eased into a playful rivalry by the time of the second film. Yang is seen at the start of the second film helping to rescue Trench Mauser and an unnamed Chinese hostage (presumably he was being held for ransom, as he is referred to as "moneybags" by Christmas) but leaves the team to escort the billionaire back to China while the others return to the US. Yang returns near the finale of the third film, now in Trench's employ; the two are called in on short-notice by Agent Drummer and Trench Mauser to help the Expendables take down Conrad Stonebanks.

Director Simon West confirms that Jet Li's lessened role in The Expendables 2 was due to scheduling conflicts; as such, Li only appears in the film's opening and in one fight scene.

=== Doctor "Doc" Death ===
Doctor "Doc" Death, portrayed by Wesley Snipes, is a former U.S. Army Special Forces medic, martial arts and knives expert of the team; he is often referred to as simply "Doc". Introduced in the third Expendables film, he was a member of the original Expendables team that was founded by Barney Ross and Conrad Stonebanks, before being imprisoned for 8 years. He is rescued and freed from a prison train by Ross, Christmas, Toll Road and Gunner Jensen. He is often shown in playful competition with Christmas over who is more skilled with knives. He assists the team in Somalia to take down a dealer named Victor Minz, only to be startled in discovering that Minz is really Stonebanks. After Stonebanks wounds Caesar, he, Christmas, Toll Road and Gunner are dismissed by Ross. Later on, they all rejoin Barney to go after Stonebanks.

Wesley Snipes was originally offered the role of Hale Caesar, but was forced to turn it down due to serving a three-year sentence for tax evasion, which is referenced in the third film. Once he was released, Stallone offered him the role of Doc.

=== Gunner Jensen ===
Gunner Jensen, portrayed by Dolph Lundgren, is a heavy weapons expert and member of the Expendables with degree in chemical engineering. It is stated by Barney in the first film that Gunner is a drug user and it is implied that this has affected his mental and emotional stability, leading to Barney reluctantly discharging Gunner from the team after he needlessly tries to hang a Somali pirate at the end of a hostage recovery mission. Gunner is later hired by James Munroe to provide intel on Barney and the Expendables when they begin disrupting his drug operation in Vilena. After a chase and a fight with his former teammate Yin Yang, Gunner is shot by Barney, but survives and gives Barney the info he needs to take Munroe down. He later rejoins the Expendables and participates in their subsequent missions in the next two films, including their missions against Vilain and Stonebanks respectively.

Gunner seems to have overcome his drug problem in the later films, as he is depicted as much more clear-headed. He and Yin Yang share a mutual dislike of each other in the first film, but this has seemingly devolved into good-natured ribbing by the second film. Gunner is often used as comic relief in The Expendables 2, and there are many in-jokes related to Dolph Lundgren's real-life persona, namely his degree in Chemistry, scholarship to MIT and his Swedish heritage; another source of comedy is Gunner's unsuccessful attempts to hit on Maggie Chan. The role of Gunner was retooled for Lundgren after Jean-Claude Van Damme declined the role during production of the first film.

=== Toll Road ===
Toll Road, portrayed by Randy Couture is the demolitions expert of the Expendables team. He has a relatively minor role in all three films, but takes part in the campaigns against Munroe, Vilain and Stonebanks. It is stated in the first film that he wrestled in college and this has left him with a cauliflower ear; he is highly self-conscious of his ear and is easily angered when other team members comment on it.

=== Hale Caesar ===
Hale Caesar, portrayed by Terry Crews, is another heavy weapons expert and the muscle-house of the Expendables team. He is usually given assignments that require amazing feats of strength; in the second film, Caesar holds open one of two spring-loaded doors by himself to allow Maggie Chan access to a safe, while the other door is only held back by the combined strength of Barney and Lee. Caesar is also often used as comic relief (his name is a pun on "hail Caesar") and has some unexpected talents, such as being a good cook. The plot of the third film revolves around Barney and his crew exacting vengeance on Stonebanks, who nearly kills Caesar. After a failed assassination mission, Caesar is shot through the back by Stonebanks with a sniper rifle and left hospitalized. He is recovering well by the film's end, and returns Barney's lucky ring.

=== Billy "The Kid" Timmons ===
Billy "The Kid" Timmons, portrayed by Liam Hemsworth, is an Australian expert sniper and Afghanistan War veteran who is a member of the Expendables during the second movie. An ex-SASR soldier, Billy became disillusioned after a disastrous mission in the Middle East which left many of his former unit dead. When he returned to base, he found that his superior officers had ordered a stray dog he had adopted be put down; seeing this as yet more pointless violence, an angered Billy resigned from the military and eventually joined the Expendables. Billy tells Barney that he intends to leave the team to start a new life with his girlfriend Sophia. However, Billy is taken hostage by Jean Vilain during the Expendables' mission in Albania and killed. His death motivates Barney to hunt down Vilain and exact vengeance.

=== John Smilee ===
John Smilee, portrayed by Kellan Lutz, is a former Force Recon Marine who is recruited to the new Expendables team. He is first approached by Barney and Bonaparte in Mexico after losing an underground fight. He helps Barney and the new team to capture Stonebanks, but later he and the other new Expendables are captured by Stonebanks' mercenaries. Barney and the old Expendables team rescue Smilee and the others and fight Stonebanks' team. At the end of the film he, along with Galgo, Luna, Mars, and Thorn, become members of the Expendables; he jokes to Barney about being the new leader.

=== Luna Maya ===
Luna Maya, portrayed by Ronda Rousey, is the first female member of the Expendables team. A nightclub bouncer, she is introduced to Barney by Bonaparte in the third film, and the two witness her make short work of some unruly patrons. Impressed with her skills, Barney immediately hires her. She along with fellow new members Smilee, Thorn and Mars help Barney capture Stonebanks. However, Stonebanks manages to free himself and his mercenaries capture the new team members. They are all later rescued by Barney and the old members. Galgo is often shown flirting with Luna when the older and younger members team up; like the others, his constant chatter irritates her. Though she is initially put off by some of the older Expendables, most notably Doctor Death, she comes to consider the entire team her family.

=== Thorn ===
Thorn, portrayed by Glen Powell, is an expert hacker, drone pilot and mountain-climber. He is recruited into Barney's new Expendables crew to help capture Conrad Stonebanks in the third film. Thorn is able to hack the security of a building where Stonebanks is having a meeting. He is later captured along with the rest of the new Expendables and used as bait by Stonebanks to capture Barney in Asmenistan. Barney, his old crew and Galgo rescue Thorn and the others, but Stonebanks activates timed explosives inside the building where they were held. Thorn delays the explosives using Gunner's PDA and is able to hold the signal until the PDA's batteries are drained. Thorn and Gunner take an immediate disliking to each other during the first meeting between the new and old Expendables, though meeting Thorn leads Gunner to also get a PDA later. He is frequently put on the spot by his teammates, such as improvising the plot to capture Stonebanks during his meeting. Thorn is also shown to be an expert rock climber, and uses his skills to climb an unfinished elevator shaft unassisted towards the film's end.

=== Mars ===
Mars, portrayed by Victor Ortiz, is one of the four newest members introduced in the third film. A former U.S. soldier, he is recruited by Barney after demonstrating both the capabilities of the latest deadly rifle and his skills with it. He, along with Smilee, Thorn, and Luna, help Barney catch Stonebanks, but the four themselves are captured by Stonebanks' men. They are later rescued by Barney and the older members and Galgo.

== Supporting characters ==
The following characters play a notable role in one or more of the films as assistance to the Expendables, but are not considered part of the team itself.

=== Trent "Trench" Mauser ===
Trent "Trench" Mauser, portrayed by Arnold Schwarzenegger, is the head of a competing mercenary group who turns down the job offer from Church in the first movie. Barney and Trench are old acquaintances, and while they do not consider each other friends, their dialogues imply that there is a mutual respect on some level.

At the beginning of the second film, Barney's crew rescues Mauser, who had become imprisoned in Nepal trying to rescue the same Chinese billionaire the Expendables are there for. Trench lets the Expendables take the hostage and is left indebted to Barney. Trench returns the favour later by rescuing the Expendables, who had been trapped in a mine by Jean Vilain. Trench, Church and the Expendables collectively take down the Sangs and Vilain, who are trying to escape Albania with 5 tons of weaponized plutonium.

Trench helps out Barney on his mission to capture Stonebanks in the third film. The two have seemingly become friends now, though Mauser calls Barney an idiot for planning to go after Stonebanks alone when his second Expendables team is captured. During the finale Agent Drummer, Trench and Yin Yang provide support for the Expendables as they are attacked by the Asmenistan army, controlled by Stonebanks.

Schwarzenegger parodies his own action movie persona with the role of Trench. He is often seen smoking a cigar, a real habit of Schwarzenegger's, and he delivers several lines that are either related to or directly taken from his prior action-movies. Trench's appearance in the first film was limited as Schwarzenegger was still serving as Governor of California during production. This is jokingly referred to in the film, as Barney claims that Trench "wants to become President".

=== Agent Max Drummer ===
Agent Max Drummer, portrayed by Harrison Ford, is Barney's CIA liaison in the third movie. He is revealed to be a former major in the United States Air Force, and it is implied that he was sent in Church's place after Barney first failed to assassinate Stonebanks. After Barney gathers a new crew composed of John Smilee, Mars, Thorn and Luna, Drummer informs Barney that Stonebanks must be captured alive in order to be tried for war crimes. Later, when Barney goes after Stonebanks with his old crew, Drummer takes Trench and Yin Yang along as support; he is shown to be a capable helicopter pilot. Despite Stonebanks' death, he seems to be in good spirits meeting Barney after their escape from Azmenistan, commenting "I haven't had this much fun in years".

Harrison Ford was hired to replace Bruce Willis after Stallone and Willis failed to agree on Willis' salary rate. Ford makes several meta jokes commenting on Church's absence (stating that he is "out of the picture"), Stallone's stroke and Jason Statham's heavy accent.

=== Agent Church ===
Agent Church, portrayed by Bruce Willis, is a CIA agent who hires the Expendables to take out General Garza in Vilena. Barney deduces that Church has been turned down by all other mercenary groups, including Trench Mauser at their first meeting, which is why he demands $5 million, and that half of this be paid in advance. Though Barney and his crew complete Church's assignment, he holds a grudge over the death of James Munroe, a rogue agent and the true mastermind behind Garza's coup. As compensation, he demands Barney deliver a map of an Albanian plutonium dump to him. However, the Expendables deviate from the mission in order to avenge the death of Billy the Kid at Jean Vilain's hands; this leads to an intervention by Church and Trench, who comes along in order to repay a debt to Barney. Church is replaced by Agent Drummer as Barney's CIA liaison in the third film.

Church's real name is unknown. His alias is in direct reference to the place where he and Barney first meet, but he continues to use the alias during his subsequent meetings with Barney. Though accused by Barney as being a man who lets others do his dirty work, he personally comes to the Expendables' aid at the end of the second film. Church is not seen in the third film, seemingly due to Barney's failure to kill Conrad Stonebanks. In truth, Willis did not appear due to disagreements with Stallone over his salary, which led to his role being retooled for the character of Drummer and the casting of Ford to replace him.

=== Tool ===
Tool, portrayed by Mickey Rourke, is a tattoo artist who also serves as a recruitment liaison for the Expendables, and his tattoo parlor doubles as the Expendables' headquarters, although Tool himself no longer gets involved in missions. He regularly participates in knife-throwing competitions with Lee Christmas. Tool served in US Military alongside Barney. While his screen time in the film is limited, Tool plays a crucial role in the plot nonetheless; he confesses to Barney that he allowed a woman to commit suicide instead of saving her during his participation in Bosnian War. The conversation with Tool spurs Barney to return to Vilena to finish his mission and rescue Sandra.

=== Booker "The Lone Wolf" ===
Booker "The Lone Wolf", portrayed by Chuck Norris, is a mercenary who famously acts alone, earning the nickname "The Lone Wolf". Booker rescues a pinned-down Barney and most of the Expendables during a battle with the Sangs mid-way through the second film, and comes to their aid once again at the end of the film, while they are trying to stop Jean Vilain. After the battle with the Sangs, Booker leaves in the company of Church, Maggie and Trench, with Booker stating that he is moving on due to the Sangs no longer being a threat.

Simon West admitted that Chuck Norris was cast due to his recent internet popularity in the form of the Chuck Norris joke memes, one of which made it into the movie as a line suggested by Norris's wife. Booker is called "The Lone Wolf", in reference to Norris character in Lone Wolf McQuade. His leitmotif during appearances is the theme from The Good, the Bad and the Ugly by Ennio Morricone.

=== Bonaparte ===
Bonaparte, portrayed by Kelsey Grammer, is a retired mercenary who is a friend of Barney Ross and ally to the Expendables. He helps Barney recruit a team of younger mercenaries who are efficient in combat, experts in weaponry, and are technology savvy. It is revealed that Bonaparte has two ex-wives and three children.

=== Agent Maggie Chan ===
Agent Maggie Chan, portrayed by Yu Nan, is a martial arts expert and hacker who works with Mr. Church. Introduced in the second film, she is assigned to work with Barney and the rest of the Expendables to fly down to Albania and retrieve a program that carries access to plutonium. Much of Maggie's history is not revealed in the film; however, the character is somewhat of a substitute to Jet Li's character Yin Yang.

== Villains ==
The following characters are antagonists in the film series.

=== Àgent James Munroe ===
Agent James Munroe, portrayed by Eric Roberts, is a rogue CIA agent and the secret benefactor behind General Garza, the military dictator and ruler of the island of Vilena, which Munroe uses as a base for a cocaine operation. The Expendables are hired by Church to kill Garza, although Barney surmises that Munroe is the actual target, and that the CIA cannot target him directly because of the bad press it would bring. After initially passing on the job after scouting the island, Barney, along with the team, goes to Vilena after learning Garza's daughter, who assisted Barney and Lee in scouting the island, has been captured. During the Expendables' attack on the palace, Garza challenges Munroe, resulting in Munroe killing him. This causes the army to attack in retaliation. During the battle, Munroe attempts to flee, but is killed by Barney and Lee.

=== General Garza ===
General Garza, portrayed by David Zayas, is a brutal dictator and ruler of the island nation of Vilena. Garza seemingly came into power with relative ease; Trench Mauser describes the former government as "half-assed". He is introduced in the first film as being in the pocket of James Munroe, and the two disagree on Munroe's drug-related activities, with Garza growing increasingly resentful of Munroe's condescending attitude towards him. His private life is also troubled, as his daughter Sandra regards him as a coward; she actively works against him by assisting Barney and Lee in their reconnaissance of the island. When the Expendables storm the island to rescue a captive Sandra and take down Munroe, Garza openly challenges Munroe's authority and orders his soldiers to take up arms against both Munroe's forces and the Expendables; he is later killed by Munroe.

=== Daniel "Dan" Paine ===
Daniel "Dan" Paine, portrayed by Steve Austin, is Munroe's main henchmen and bodyguard, and apparent second-in-command. Paine is said to have trained Garza's soldiers and is seemingly in charge of them. Paine is always accompanied by "The Brit", who also serves as Munroe's hired muscle. Paine, a tough, dangerous man, fights Barney, ending in Barney getting his "ass kicked", before facing off with Toll Road while trying to escape. After a serious brawl, Toll Road kills Paine after throwing him into a fire.

=== Lawrence "The Brit" Sparks ===
Lawrence "The Brit" Sparks, portrayed by Gary Daniels, is the 2nd of Munroe's henchmen/bodyguards/hired muscle, seemingly the third-in-command under Paine. He is never properly named in the film and is only referred to as "The Brit". He does not get along with Gunner when the latter switches sides, and the two even come to blows during their first meeting. He later attacks Barney after Garza's men capture him, and is finally killed by Yin Yang in a martial arts brawl (both Li and Daniels are former martial arts champions).

=== Jean Vilain ===
Jean Vilain, portrayed by Jean-Claude Van Damme, is the leader of the Sangs, ex-soldier of French Foreign Legion and the main antagonist of the second film. He is a martial artist, mercenary and terrorist leader who plans to bring the world to its knees with five tons of weapons-grade plutonium. He engages in a fight with Barney and is killed by Barney at the end of the film as revenge for Vilain's earlier killing of Billy the Kid.

=== Hector ===
Hector, portrayed by Scott Adkins, is Jean Vilain's henchman and the presumed second-in-command of the Sangs. A sadistic and psychopathic murderer, he rivals Lee Christmas in martial arts and blade combat prowess. He engages Lee in a fight and is killed at the end of the second film when Lee punches him into a rear helicopter propeller.

=== Conrad Stonebanks ===
Conrad Stonebanks, portrayed by Mel Gibson, is an Australian arms trader, former SASR soldier and co-founder of the original Expendables, and was introduced in the third film as the main antagonist. He was originally presumed dead, but was revealed to be alive when he was seen delivering a shipment of bombs to warlords of Somalia under the alias Victor Minz. When Barney Ross discovers him, the current Expendables team engage in a shootout against Stonebanks and his men. In an act of retaliation for Barney's interference, Stonebanks severely wounds Hale Caesar. Planning to pursue Stonebanks, Barney retires the old members and hires a new team of younger Expendables members: Smilee, Luna, Thorn and Mars. They, along with Trench Mauser, manage to track Stonebanks, as he is conducting a business deal in Romania. Stonebanks is then captured by Ross and the new team members, and they attempt to bring him in a van to the International Criminal Court by orders of CIA operative Max Drummer. However, Stonebanks' men manage to catch up to the Expendables, as Stonebanks had a GPS tracker in his possession. Stonebanks escapes and captures Smilee, Luna, Thorn and Mars, and brings them to a building located in the country Asmenistan. Stonebanks then sends Barney a video, challenging Ross to come after him. Now accompanied by his old team members and seasoned new member Galgo, Barney rescues the new recruits, only to be informed by Stonebanks that the building is wired with explosives. Thorn manages to hack into the systems by using a jamming device to stall the timer in the explosives. They are then attacked and ambushed by armed forces sent by Stonebanks. With aid from Drummer, Mauser and Yin Yang, the Expendables manage to fight off the soldiers while Barney faces Stonebanks alone. The two have a massive fight that results in Stonebanks's death, while Barney narrowly escapes the crumbling building. It is revealed that Stonebanks has a daughter.

=== Agent Marsh / Ocelot ===
Agent Marsh / Ocelot, portrayed by Andy Garcia, is a corrupt CIA agent codenamed Ocelot hoping to profit from igniting World War III and the main antagonist of the fourth film. It's likely that Marsh, as Ocelot, did a little groundwork behind the CIA's backs when he and Barney Ross were partners at that time. a long time ago, Marsh was responsible for the sabotage of Barney's mission to cover up his identity, and it resulted in Barney's team dying as a result, which Barney escaped at that time. Marsh reveals himself when he kills Phen Lyong Bai who knows who Ocelot. However, his plans were foiled and he was killed by Barney Ross.
