= The Expendables 3 =

2014 film by Patrick Hughes

- Theatrical release poster
- Directed by: Patrick Hughes
- Screenplay by: Sylvester Stallone; Creighton Rothenberger; Katrin Benedikt
- Story by: Sylvester Stallone
- Based on: Characters by David Callaham
- Produced by: Avi Lerner; Kevin King-Templeton; Danny Lerner; Les Weldon; John Thompson
- Starring: Sylvester Stallone; Jason Statham; Antonio Banderas; Jet Li; Wesley Snipes; Dolph Lundgren; Kelsey Grammer; Randy Couture; Terry Crews; Kellan Lutz; Ronda Rousey; Glen Powell; Victor Ortiz; Mel Gibson; Harrison Ford; Arnold Schwarzenegger
- Cinematography: Peter Menzies, Jr.
- Edited by: Sean Albertson; Paul Harb
- Music by: Brian Tyler
- Production companies: Millennium Films; Nu Image
- Distributed by: Lionsgate
- Release dates: August 4, 2014 (London); August 15, 2014 (United States)
- Running time: 126 minutes
- Country: United States
- Language: English
- Budget: $90–100 million
- Box office: $214.7 million

The Expendables 3 is a 2014 American action film directed by Patrick Hughes and written by Creighton Rothenberger, Katrin Benedikt and Sylvester Stallone. It is the third installment in The Expendables franchise and the sequel to The Expendables (2010) and The Expendables 2 (2012). The film features an ensemble cast of largely action film actors; in addition to Stallone, Jason Statham, Jet Li, Dolph Lundgren, Randy Couture, Terry Crews and Arnold Schwarzenegger reprise their roles from previous films, with Antonio Banderas, Wesley Snipes, Kelsey Grammer, Kellan Lutz, Ronda Rousey, Glen Powell, Victor Ortiz, Robert Davi, Mel Gibson and Harrison Ford appearing in new roles.

The story follows the mercenary group known as The Expendables as they come into conflict with ruthless arms dealer Conrad Stonebanks, the Expendables' co-founder, who is determined to destroy the team. The film premiered in London on August 4, 2014 and was released theatrically on August 15, 2014, by Lionsgate. Unlike the first two films in the franchise, The Expendables 3 received a PG-13 rating instead of an R rating, which upset many fans of the franchise. Partly due to negative critical reviews and being leaked three weeks before its scheduled release, the film grossed $214.7 million worldwide on an estimated $90–100 million budget, becoming the lowest-grossing film of the franchise until its sequel, Expend4bles, was released in 2023.

== Plot ==
The Expendables—led by Barney Ross and formed by Lee Christmas, Gunner Jensen, and Toll Road—extract former member Doctor Death, a medic and knives specialist, from a dictator’s fortress prison-camp during his transfer on a train. They recruit Doctor Death to assist them in intercepting a shipment of bombs meant to be delivered to a warlord in Somalia. Arriving there, they reunite with Hale Caesar, who directs them to the drop point, where Barney is surprised to find out that the arms trader providing the bombs is Conrad Stonebanks, a disgraced former co-founder of the Expendables who went rogue and was presumed dead. In the ensuing firefight, The Expendables kill all but Stonebanks, who shoots Caesar. They are forced to retreat when Stonebanks drops a bomb on them from his helicopter, and Caesar is severely injured.

Back in the United States, CIA operative Max Drummer, the Expendables' new missions manager, gives Barney a mission to capture Stonebanks to bring him to the International Criminal Court to be tried for war crimes. Blaming himself for Caesar's injuries, Barney disbands the Expendables and leaves for Las Vegas, where he enlists retired mercenary-turned-recruiter Bonaparte to help him find a new team of younger mercenaries. The recruits include former U.S. Marine John Smilee, nightclub bouncer Luna, computer expert Thorn, and weapons expert Mars. Skilled sharpshooter Galgo asks to be included in the team, but Barney turns him down.

The four new team members rendezvous with Barney's rival Trench Mauser, returning a favor for Barney. Drummer has traced Stonebanks to Bucharest, where he is set to make an arms deal. Barney and the new recruits infiltrate an office building Stonebanks is using and, having to kill a few men in the process including arms buyer Goran Vata, capture Stonebanks. In transit, Stonebanks taunts Barney and explains why he betrayed the Expendables. Barney nearly kills him to shut him up, but, despite Stonebanks egging him on, he stands down. Stonebanks' men catch up to them, with the aid of his GPS Tracker, and fire a missile at the team's van. Barney is thrown into a river, while Smilee, Luna, Thorn, and Mars are captured by Stonebanks' crew. Barney kills Stonebanks' retrieval team and escapes.

Stonebanks sends Barney a video, challenging Barney to come after him and giving him his location in Azmenistan. While preparing to leave and mount a rescue alone, Barney is found by Galgo, who offers his services again. Barney accepts, later accompanied by the veteran Expendables. They rescue the young mercenaries, only to learn from Stonebanks that he has rigged the place with explosives with only 45 seconds left for them to explode. As both the young and veteran Expendables fight one another, Barney convinces them to work together to take down Stonebanks. As the final battle begins, Thorn uses a jammer device to delay the countdown, giving them just under half an hour before detonation. Stonebanks orders the Azmenistan army to attack the building with full force, including tanks and attack helicopters. Drummer and Trench arrive in a helicopter to help, alongside returning Expendables member Yin Yang.

The new and veteran members of the Expendables work together to kill Stonebanks' men. When a second wave moves in, Drummer lands on the building to evacuate the team. As everyone makes it to Drummer's chopper, Stonebanks personally attacks Barney after shooting him down. Having been forced to remove the armor and his weapon, Barney and Stonebanks engage in hand-to-hand combat. Both are evenly matched, but Barney knocks down Stonebanks before they both reach for their guns. Stonebanks shoots, but Barney gets the better of him. At his mercy, Stonebanks questions Barney about delivering him to the International Criminal Court. Barney coldly shoots Stonebanks in response. Seconds after Stonebanks' death, the batteries of Thorn's device run out, causing the building to explode and collapse. The team makes it to Drummer's helicopter and flies away to safety, as Barney clings to it from the outside. In the aftermath, Caesar recovers from his wounds, and Barney officially accepts Galgo, Smilee, Luna, Thorn, and Mars into the team. They all celebrate at a bar together.

== Cast ==
- Sylvester Stallone as Barney Ross
  The leader of the Expendables.
- Jason Statham as Lee Christmas
  The team's knife expert, hand to hand fighter, former SAS soldier and Second-In-Command.
- Antonio Banderas as Galgo
  A former member of the Spanish Legion, Croatian war veteran, and an expert sharpshooter.
- Jet Li as Yin Yang
  The team's hand-to-hand combat expert, now working for Trench.
- Wesley Snipes as Doctor "Doc" Death
  A former US Army Special Forces medic, knife expert, and one of the original Expendables.
- Dolph Lundgren as Gunner Jensen
  The volatile member of the team with degree in chemical engineering.
- Kelsey Grammer as Bonaparte
  A retired mercenary and ally of the Expendables.
- Randy Couture as Toll Road
  The team's demolitions expert and former wrestler.
- Terry Crews as Hale Caesar
  The team's barrel-weapons specialist.
- Kellan Lutz as John Smilee
  A former Force Recon Marine, expert motorcycle rider, recruited to the Expendables.
- Ronda Rousey as Luna
  An athletic nightclub bouncer recruited by Bonaparte.
- Glen Powell as Thorn
  A highly skilled hacker, climber and drone pilot.
- Victor Ortiz as Mars
  A sharpshooter and lethal ex-U.S. soldier, used to work at DARPA.
- Harrison Ford as Agent Max Drummer
  A CIA field operations officer and ex-USAF pilot who manages the Expendables.
- Arnold Schwarzenegger as Trent "Trench" Mauser
  Barney's former teammate and on and off again friend.
- Natalie Burn as Conrad's wife
- Sarai Givaty as Camilla
- Robert Davi as Goran Vata
  The head of the Albanian mafia.
- Mel Gibson as Conrad Stonebanks
  A ruthless arms dealer who was formerly Australian SAS (SASR) soldier and the co-founder of the Expendables before going rogue.

== Production ==
=== Development and writing ===
In March 2012, cast member Randy Couture said a third installment of The Expendables might begin production in late 2012 after the release of The Expendables 2. In April 2012, Steven Seagal said he was offered a role in a third film. In August 2012, producer Avi Lerner confirmed that Nicolas Cage had been signed for the then-potential sequel. He also said that the producers intended to bring back the series' stars, attempting to have Mickey Rourke reprise his role, and had approached Clint Eastwood, Harrison Ford, and Wesley Snipes to play new roles. Sylvester Stallone said "We are thinking about different concepts—the third one is the hardest. The second is the natural progression. The third, that's when the air gets rare. We're thinking ambitiously about it, you now have to give audiences something they don't expect at all, Maybe, even going into a different genre". Also in August, Chuck Norris said he would not return for a sequel. On August 13, 2012, Jean-Claude Van Damme indicated that Stallone might include him in The Expendables 3 as Claude Vilain, brother of Jean Vilain. On October 31, 2012, it was confirmed that Nu Image and Millennium Films were in the process of pre-selling international distribution rights for The Expendables 3. On December 19, 2012, it was reported that Jackie Chan had agreed to join the sequel on the condition that he would have more than a minor role. Chan later dropped out of the project due to scheduling conflicts.

In March 2013, Stallone confirmed he was writing a script for the sequel and that he intended for the film to be more humorous with moments of drama. Stallone also said that Seagal would not be in the film and that he wanted to cast more young actors in their mid-20s. In April 2013, Stallone announced that Patrick Hughes would direct the sequel. In May 2013, Chan, Snipes, Cage and Milla Jovovich were announced to be in advanced negotiations to join the film. In June 2013, Lionsgate announced that the film would be released on August 15, 2014. In July 2013, it was reported that actor Mel Gibson would portray the film's villain and later that month Stallone confirmed Gibson's involvement. Also in July, actor Kellan Lutz and professional fighters Victor Ortiz and Ronda Rousey were added to the cast. It was revealed that the film would feature several younger and technology-oriented action heroes who clash with the veteran Expendables. In August 2013, it was confirmed that Ford, Antonio Banderas and Glen Powell would join the cast and that Bruce Willis would not be reprising his role as Mr. Church. Willis's lack of involvement was cited as a disagreement over money with production sources indicating that Willis was offered $3 million for four days of shooting in Bulgaria but wanted $4 million. On September 17, 2013, Kelsey Grammer was announced to be in negotiations to join the film.

=== Filming ===
Principal photography began on August 19, 2013, in Bulgaria and at the Nu Boyana Film studio in Sofia and ended on October 22. In September 2013, Terry Crews revealed in an interview that Jason Statham survived an on-set mishap when the truck he was driving plunged into the Black Sea after its brakes had failed. In a November 2013 interview, Randy Couture confirmed that filming had finished and that discussions for a fourth Expendables film were taking place.

== Music ==
The film's score was composed by Brian Tyler. The soundtrack was released by La-La Land Records on August 12, 2014.

== Release ==
=== Marketing ===
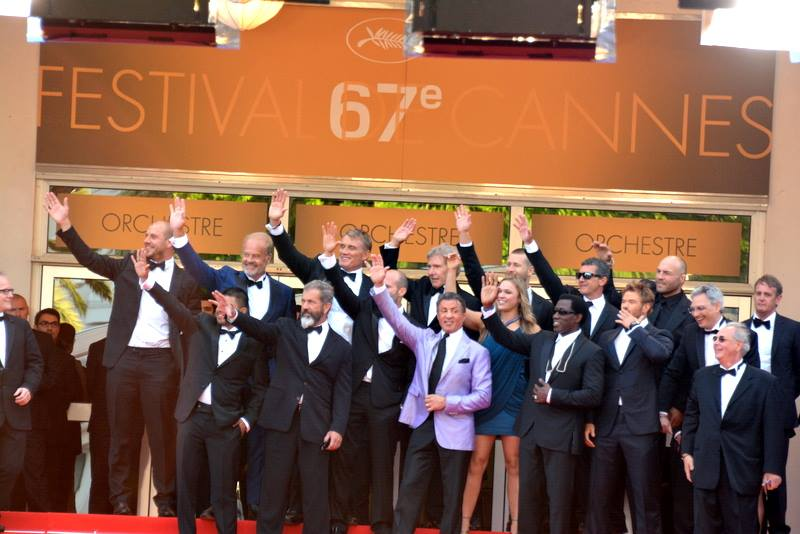
The cast of The Expendables 3 at the 2014 Cannes Film Festival

On December 19, 2013, the first teaser trailer got released with the intent of showcasing the large cast of the movie. At 2014 CinemaCon, the official poster of the film was shown for the first time, although it only slightly differs from material shown before, featuring a white background instead of a black one. The marketing scheme of putting a huge emphasis on the film's ensemble cast of famous action actors was continued in early April when 16 character posters of the film's cast were released and divided over four websites for maximum exposure. One day later, the first trailer with actual footage from the film premiered, again highlighting the film's huge cast, being referred to as a "roll call trailer" by Lionsgate. At the 2014 Cannes Film Festival, Millennium Films hosted a special event promoting the film at the Carlton Hotel with Sylvester Stallone, Jason Statham, Arnold Schwarzenegger, Mel Gibson, Harrison Ford, Wesley Snipes, Antonio Banderas, Dolph Lundgren, Kelsey Grammer, Randy Couture, Kellan Lutz, Victor Ortiz, Glen Powell and director Patrick Hughes attending. The event lasted the entire day and featured the cast driving down the Croisette in tanks.

On June 5, a new TV promo with new footage was released. Instead of highlighting the all-star cast as the previous ones, this trailer focused on the new additions to the cast, prominently Lutz, Ronda Rousey and Ortiz, contrasting their young characters with the more experienced ones of Stallone and Grammer. The same day, Stallone also released a behind the scenes video via his Twitter. On June 17, a long cinematic trailer was released, giving a first look at Gibson as Conrad Stonebanks as well as showcasing the film's story for the first time. A week later on June 23, the new banner was released, featuring all 17 cast members except Robert Davi. On June 4, a new TV trailer was released, containing new footage, although mostly consisting of footage already released. A longer version of the trailer was released a week later and one day after that, another TV trailer, themed to coincide with the 2014 FIFA World Cup, was released. At 2014 ComicCon, 16 new character posters in pop art style were released.

=== Rating ===
Unlike the first two films in the Expendables franchise, this film received a PG-13 rating instead of an R rating, which received backlash from the fans. At the 2014 Cannes Film Festival, Sylvester Stallone announced that he was aiming for a PG-13 rating for the film. Stating that albeit it was close to being rated R, he wanted to reach a younger and broader audience with the new film. However, when Stallone first submitted the film to the MPAA, they assigned it with the usual R rating and had to be trimmed down to be rated PG-13. On July 1, the MPAA granted The Expendables 3 a PG-13 rating; the given description being "violence including intense sustained gun battles and fight scenes and for language."

Since its release, Stallone regrets the PG-13 rating, saying that it was "a horrible miscalculation on everyone's part in trying to reach a wider audience but in doing such, diminish the violence that the audience expects. I'm quite certain it won't happen again."

=== Unauthorized duplication and distribution ===
On July 25, 2014, three weeks ahead of the film's premiere, a DVD-quality illegal leak was downloaded, via file sharing sites, more than 189,000 times over a 24-hour period. After one week, it was estimated that the leak had been downloaded over 2 million times.

On July 31, 2014, the film's studio, Lionsgate, filed a lawsuit in California federal court against ten anonymous individuals for copyright infringement. The studio reported that one digital copy of the film was stolen and uploaded to the Internet. Lionsgate stated they sent demand letters to operators of the sites (Limetorrents.com, Billionuploads.com, Hulkfile.eu, Played.to, Swankshare.com and Dotsemper.com) but received no reply. In August 2014, cloud hosting provider Hulkfile.eu ceased its operations worldwide because the company said it had no other option after it was damaged by the Lionsgate lawsuit. In June 2015, Lionsgate settled out of court with the operators of Played.to, a video hosting site for streaming a leaked copy of the movie.

In March 2016, the California court issued a default judgment to each of the operators of three of the infringing sites (Limetorrents.com, Swankshare.com and Dotsemper.com) to be fined US$150,000 (equivalent to $201,227 in 2025); as of March 2016, only Limetorrents is still operating and all of those sites are located outside the United States; therefore, it is unlikely Lionsgate will collect the fines.

=== Home media ===
The Expendables 3 was released on DVD and Blu-ray on November 25, 2014, by Lionsgate Home Entertainment. The Blu-ray Combo-Pack contains an extended version of the film accompanying the theatrical version as well as behind-the-scenes featurettes, a blooper reel and a Dolby Atmos multi-channel track. The regular DVD release includes only the theatrical cut. A 4K UHD Blu-ray was released in the United States on March 1, 2016.

== Reception ==
=== Box office ===
The Expendables 3 grossed $39.3 million in North America and $175.3 million in other territories for a total gross of $214.6 million.

The film was released on August 15, 2014, in the United States and earned $875,000 during its late night Thursday screenings from 2,200 locations. It did better than its predecessors The Expendables ($870,000) and The Expendables 2 ($685,000). However, its first showing was at 7 P.M., whereas the previous films had their first showings at midnight. It earned $5.9 million on its first day below the $13 million opening day of The Expendables and $10 million opening day of The Expendables 2. The film grossed $5.7 million on its second day and $4.2 million on its third day for a three-day total of $15.8 million.

One possible reason for this loss in ticket sales is because the film leaked three weeks ahead of its release; however, since most downloads were outside the United States, if every downloading American paid to see the movie, it would have made only $4 million more. Another possible reason was the PG-13 cut which was meant to attract younger audiences. Only 34% of viewers were under 25 years old while the less violent cut may have reduced interest from older audiences. Sylvester Stallone later admitted that toning the film down for a PG-13 rating was a mistake.

The film was released in China on September 5, 2014, and topped the box office in its first week's release earning $33.68 million from 231,836 screenings and 6.92 million admissions.

=== Critical response ===
On Rotten Tomatoes, the film holds an approval rating of 32% based on 178 reviews, with an average rating of 4.2/10. The site's critics consensus reads, "Like its predecessors, The Expendables 3 offers a modicum of all-star thrills for old-school action thriller aficionados but given all the talent assembled, it should have been a lot more fun." On Metacritic, the film has a weighted average score of 35 out of 100, based on 36 critics, indicating "generally unfavorable reviews". Audiences polled by CinemaScore gave the film an average grade of "A−" on an A+ to F scale.

=== Accolades ===
Kelsey Grammer won the Golden Raspberry Award for Worst Supporting Actor for his work in the film (along with Legends of Oz: Dorothy's Return, Think Like a Man Too and Transformers: Age of Extinction) while Mel Gibson and Arnold Schwarzenegger were also nominated in that category at the 35th Golden Raspberry Awards.

List of accolades
Award	Category	Recipient(s)	Result
Golden Trailer Awards	Best Summer 2014 Blockbuster Poster	The Expendables 3 "Stallone Teaser" Lionsgate, Ignition	Nominated
Golden Raspberry Awards	Worst Supporting Actor	Mel Gibson	Nominated
Golden Raspberry Awards	Worst Supporting Actor	Kelsey Grammer	Won
Golden Raspberry Awards	Worst Supporting Actor	Arnold Schwarzenegger	Nominated

== Sequel ==
A sequel titled Expend4bles, was released in 2023.

== See also ==
- List of American films of 2014
- Sylvester Stallone filmography
- Arnold Schwarzenegger filmography
- Harrison Ford filmography
- Antonio Banderas filmography
- Jason Statham filmography
- Dolph Lundgren filmography
- Wesley Snipes filmography
- Jet Li filmography
- Mel Gibson filmography
