= After Dark (comics) =

2010 limited comic series

- Cover of After Dark #0, artwork by Francesco "Matt" Mattina

Publication information
- Publisher: Radical Comics
- Schedule: Bi-Monthly
- Format: Graphic novella
- Genre: Post-apocalyptic
- Publication date: August – December 2010
- No. of issues: 3

Creative team
- Created by: Antoine Fuqua & Wesley Snipes
- Written by: Peter Milligan
- Artist: Jeff Nentrup

After Dark is a three-issue, dark science fiction limited series published by Radical Comics in a 56-page graphic novella format. The series concept and characters were created by film director/producer Antoine Fuqua (director of Training Day, Shooter, and Brooklyn's Finest) and actor Wesley Snipes (star of the Blade series, Money Train, and Demolition Man). The series is written by Peter Milligan (best known for Marvel Comics's X-Statix series) and illustrated by Jeff Nentrup.

On June 30, 2010, a "#0" issue was released as a prequel. The official start of the main series is August 2010.

== Publication history ==
The first book is due to be released in August (ISBN 1-935417-15-0) and the second in October (ISBN 1-935417-16-9).

== Plot synopsis ==
The series is set in a post-apocalyptic near-future in which the Earth exists in a state of near-perpetual darkness. Civilization has largely become confined to domed cities in which the populace exists in a state of drug-addled stupor in order to while away time between birth and death.

The rulers of Solar City, the most populated of humanity's remaining bastions, enlist a Bedouin drifter, named simply Omar, to lead a team into the wilds outside of the city in search of the savior they believe may exist somewhere in the sparsely populated wilds.
