= Max D. Adams =

American screenwriter and author

Max D. Adams is an American screenwriter and author. The winner of a Nicholl Fellowship in Screenwriting and an Austin Film Festival screenwriting award early in her career, Adams went on to be dubbed “Red Hot Adams” by Daily Variety.

Adams has worked with Columbia Pictures, Hollywood Pictures, Touchstone Pictures, Universal Pictures, Walt Disney Studios, and TriStar Pictures. Her produced feature films include Excess Baggage, (credited), The Ladykillers, (uncredited), and One For the Money (uncredited).

During Adams early days as a film student at the University of Utah, Adams crewed local films including Trent Harris's Plan Ten From Outer Space and in later years on the comedy circuit in Los Angeles made cameo appearances in indy films including Tony Tarantino's Underbelly Blues.

Adams is the founder of two international online screenwriting workshops, The Left Door and 5150. She is the author of The New Screenwriter's Survival Guide; Or, Guerrilla Meeting Tactics and Other Acts of War., is a former University of Utah adjunct professor and WGA online mentor, and is the founder of The Academy of Film Writing.
