= One Night Stand (1997 film) =

1997 American drama film by British director Mike Figgis

- Theatrical release poster
- Directed by: Mike Figgis
- Written by: Mike Figgis
- Produced by: Mike Figgis; Ben Myron; Annie Stewart
- Starring: Wesley Snipes; Nastassja Kinski; Kyle MacLachlan; Ming-Na Wen; Robert Downey Jr.
- Cinematography: Declan Quinn
- Edited by: John Smith
- Music by: Mike Figgis
- Distributed by: New Line Cinema
- Release date: November 14, 1997 (United States)
- Running time: 102 min.
- Country: United States
- Language: English
- Budget: $23 million
- Box office: $2.6 million (US)

One Night Stand is a 1997 American drama film written and directed by Mike Figgis. The film stars Wesley Snipes, Nastassja Kinski, Kyle MacLachlan, Ming-Na Wen and Robert Downey Jr. The first draft of the screenplay was written by Joe Eszterhas, who had his name removed from the project following Figgis's rewrite.

== Plot ==
Max Carlyle lives in Los Angeles, where he has a successful career directing television commercials and is happily married to Mimi, with whom he has two children. While visiting New York City, Max meets Karen by chance after missing a flight; circumstances keep bringing them together over the course of the evening, and they end up in a steamy one night stand. When he returns home, Max seems distant and unhappy, though Mimi can't tell why and Max won't say. A year later, Max and Mimi fly to New York to visit his close friend Charlie, who is near death from AIDS. Max meets Charlie's brother Vernon and is introduced to his new wife—Karen. Facing Karen sends Max into an emotional tailspin, and he realizes that he must tell Mimi the truth about his indiscretion.

== Cast ==
- Wesley Snipes as Maximilian "Max" Carlyle
- Nastassja Kinski as Karen
- Kyle MacLachlan as Vernon Rivers
- Ming-Na Wen as Mimi Carlyle
- Robert Downey Jr. as Charlie Rivers
- Glenn Plummer as George
- Amanda Donohoe as Margaux
- Thomas Haden Church as Don
- Julian Sands as Charlie's Nurse
- Xander Berkeley as Charlie's friend

== Production ==
=== Development and writing ===
The film was based on a script by Joe Eszterhas then at a career peak due to the success of Basic Instinct (1992). In 1994, Eszterhas sold a four-page outline for One Night Stand to New Line for $2.5 million, with an additional $1.5 million to be paid once filming had started.

"No one has ever paid this for a movie idea," said Eszterhas' agent Guy McElwaine. The previous record was $1.6 million (against $3.4 million) paid to Eszterhas by producer Jon Peters to adapt a book about John Gotti for Columbia Pictures.

Part of the appeal of the deal was Adrian Lyne was attached to direct. Lyne would be paid $250,000 to help develop the script and have a final fee of $7 million.

Robert Shaye of New Line said, "With Joe Eszterhas and Adrian Lyne, you're more than investing in an idea, you're investing in a film with a world-class screenwriter and director who can attract world-class talent." Shaye said he regarded the pitch as "a completed package [rather] than notes on a piece of paper."

Eszterhas says the film was based on the break up of his marriage. When the couple in the film have a one-night stand, "They talk, they have sex, they make love, and I distinguish between the two things. It's not just the sex, it's to do with the heart, not the glands. Now I am 50, I am sure of the difference."

Eszterhas handed in his script in early 1995. According to the Los Angeles Times, his "first draft certainly wasn't the sort of script you'd want to give Bob Dole for bedtime reading. Its first 65 pages are given over to an Olympic decathlon-style sexual encounter between the couple, with almost as much trash talk about sex as sex itself."

=== Pre-production ===
Lyne decided to drop out to helm the remake of Lolita (1997). New Line then approached Mike Figgis who was coming off Leaving Las Vegas. Figgis agreed to direct the film for a fee of around $2.5 million if he could rewrite the script and shoot the film in an informal style, using multiple cameras and allowing improvisation.

"I expect people will look at me like I've defected to the Fascist Party," said Figgis of working on an erotic thriller. "But I'm not going to be swayed by popular opinion. Joe's script had something that was a lot less formulaic than the other scripts I was seeing."

Figgis said he was attracted to the idea of making a big budget film because he could "have a reasonable budget for the music and control of the music" for the first time in his career, and final cut of the film.

New Line's President Mike De Luca said Figgis' reworking of material "fine with us, because [Mike] has a vision of how to bring the most to the material. We wanted an American 'Last Tango in Paris,' a film that explores sexual politics and hypocrisy. Joe's script was about the couple's relationship. Mike's version focuses more on the consequences."

Figgis changed the scripts significantly. The Times said "reading the scripts is like hearing two different versions of the same song, one by Eddie Van Halen, the other by Wynton Marsalis."

Figgis changed key characters and added a subplot about a friend who is dying of AIDS. "A good friend of mine died of AIDS and it had a powerful effect on me," says Figgis. "To me, the character was a catalyst, someone who'd influence the other people in the film."

Eszterhas felt the script had changed so much he asked for his name to be taken off the credits. During filming he said "I have a lot of respect for Mike, so I'm very curious to see how the film will turn out."

=== Casting ===
Wesley Snipes was cast in the male lead. "It's a real British white male part--I almost used an English accent," he said. "But that's what makes it a challenge. There are things in the script that are completely implausible to me. But it's Mike's movie and I respect him, so I don't interject my own perspective."

Nastassja Kinski was Figgis' first choice for the role of Karen. "We asked ourselves how middle America would respond to the casting," said New Line executive vice president Richard Saperstein. "But we felt this wasn't a black and white issue. It's not a film like 'Jungle Fever' that was about interracial love. It's a story about the impact of extramarital love on a relationship."

The making of the film coincided with the peak of One Night Stand actor Robert Downey Jr.'s drug addictions. Mike Figgis recalled Downey showed up to an introductory meeting "barefoot, high and brandishing a handgun." When principal photography was still occurring, Downey was arrested for cocaine/heroin possession and breaking into a neighbor's house. It has been reported that just days after this, Downey startled the crew by showing up to the film's set, and delivered what Figgis described as a "completely mind-blowing" performance. He stated "He was on time and did amazing work. He was quite incredible, not only on the basis of considering that he was going through these problems, just on a very pure level." Critics noted "creepy" similarities between the pale and underweight AIDS afflicted character Charlie and Downey's real life state. At one point Downey's performance in the film was being considered for an Oscar nomination, despite the fact that Downey would have been in prison again when the awards were to take place in early 1998.

== Reception ==
=== Critical response ===
One Night Stand earned a mixed response from critics. On review aggregator website Rotten Tomatoes, the film holds an approval rating of 33%, based on 39 reviews, and an average rating of 5.1/10. Audiences polled by CinemaScore give the film an average grade of "C" on an A+ to F scale. Variety's David Rooney wrote, "as fluid, loose and seductive as the languid jazz riffs with which director Mike Figgis underscores its moods, One Night Stand is a complex, almost existential take on relationships and reassessing life choices." Rooney adds, "while it’s compromised by a far too tidy resolution that will leave many feeling cheated, what comes before is strong enough to ensure a critical support camp, and to put this New Line release across to enlightened urban audiences." CNN's Paul Tatara said in November 1997 that, "One Night Stand [is] worth watching, despite the fact that it is wandering and nearly uneventful." Regarding the performances, he said "the interplay between the Snipes and Kinski characters is charming, tentative, and thoroughly believable", also noting that "Downey's performance is a revelation, completely void of the sort of pathos that usually mar these stories."

A negative review at the time came from Janet Maslin of The New York Times. In November 1997, she said that "Figgis takes a regrettable swan dive with One-Night Stand", claiming that "the screenplay, now credited to Figgis, is at the heart of the problem, being painfully superficial or tongue-tied all of the time. The story was originally written by Joe Eszterhas, himself no master of delicacy, who went so far as to abandon a writing credit. Think about that." Charles Taylor of Salon had a positive view of Snipes' acting in the film, but said "Snipes is stuck in some of the movie's worst scenes. There is some truly terrible comedy with Snipes having to deal with the family dog sniffing his crotch when he returns home, and some even worse moments when he has to show his contempt for his bourgeois co-workers at a dinner party he throws with his wife." On the November 15, 1997 episode of Siskel & Ebert, it received a thumbs down from Gene Siskel and a thumbs up from Roger Ebert.

=== Accolades ===
Wesley Snipes won the Volpi Cup for Best Actor at the 54th Venice International Film Festival.

=== Legacy ===
In a 1999 interview, Figgis was asked if he was surprised that his film Leaving Las Vegas was successful, to which Figgis replied: "Completely! I thought it would bomb horribly and thought that One Night Stand would be a huge commercial hit! (laughs) I'm very glad Leaving Las Vegas did well, and still don't quite know what happened with One Night Stand".

In a June 2017 interview with The Guardian, Figgis named One Night Stand among his favorite films that he had directed. He also praised Wesley Snipes’s performance and acknowledged that the film had received poor reviews in the United States, although he felt it had been better received in Europe.

When ranking the 59 films of Robert Downey Jr. in 2021, Kyle Wilson of Screen Rant placed One Night Stand at 47th. He said, "this drama doesn't really have the bite or sensuality one might hope, but it does boast some extremely good performances, most of all Downey, who brings a soulful sensitivity to the potentially cynical and awards-baiting role of the sick friend."
