= Wesley Snipes =

American actor (born 1962)

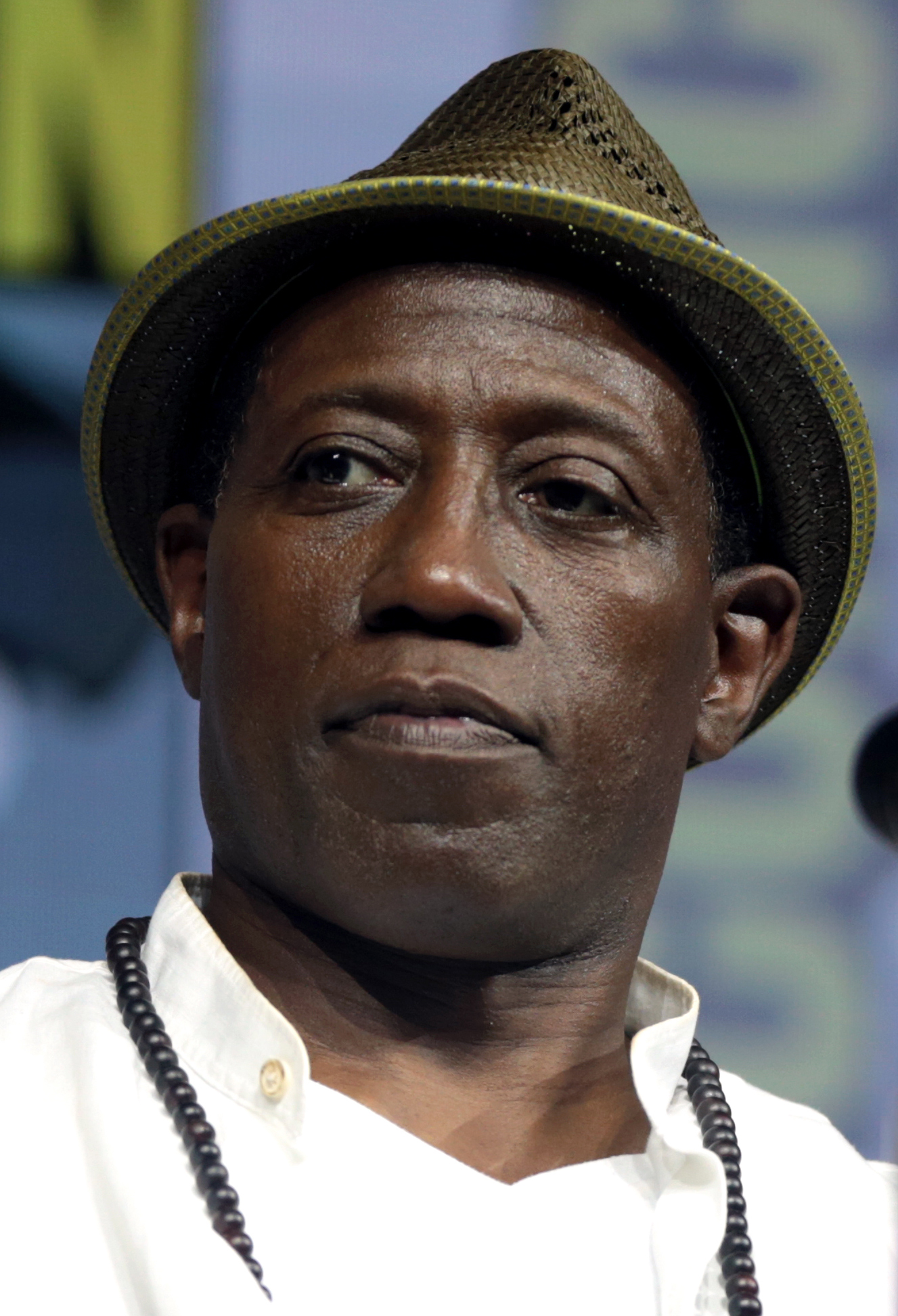
- Snipes in 2018
- Born: Wesley Trent Snipes; July 31, 1962 (age 64); Orlando, Florida, U.S.
- Education: State University of New York at Purchase (BFA)
- Occupations: Actor; producer; martial artist; author
- Years active: 1984–2010; 2013–present
- Works: Full list
- Height: 5 ft 9 in (175 cm)
- Spouses: April Dubois (m. 1985; div. 1990) Nakyung Park (m. 2003)
- Children: 5

Wesley Trent Snipes (born July 31, 1962) is an American actor, martial artist, author, and film producer. In a film career spanning more than forty years, Snipes has appeared in a variety of genres, such as numerous thrillers, dramatic feature films, and comedies, though he is best known for his action films. He was nominated for the Independent Spirit Award for Best Supporting Male for his work in The Waterdance (1992) and won the Volpi Cup for Best Actor for his performance in the film One Night Stand (1997). Films in which he has appeared have grossed over $3.6 billion worldwide.

Snipes had notable parts in the comedy film Major League (1989), the drama Mo' Better Blues (1990), and the crime drama King of New York (1990) before gaining prominence by playing a drug lord in the crime drama New Jack City (1991). He subsequently received more attention for the drama film Jungle Fever (1991), the sports comedy White Men Can't Jump (1992), and the action film Passenger 57 (1992). He has since starred in various genres such as the comedy film To Wong Foo, Thanks for Everything! Julie Newmar (1995), the thriller The Fan (1996), and the drama film Down in the Delta (1998) but mostly established himself as an action star, portraying both heroes and villains in films such as Demolition Man (1993), Rising Sun (1993), Money Train (1995), and U.S. Marshals (1998). Also in 1998, he was cast as Eric Brooks / Blade in the superhero film Blade, based on the Marvel Comics superhero of the same name, a role he went on to reprise in Blade II (2002), Blade: Trinity (2004), and Deadpool & Wolverine (2024).

From the mid-2000s, Snipes appeared in direct-to-video films before returning to theatrical releases with films such as Brooklyn's Finest (2009) and The Expendables 3 (2014). His television work includes the drama series H.E.L.P. (1990), the action series The Player (2015), and the limited series True Story (2021) as well as the romantic drama film Disappearing Acts (2000).

He formed a production company, Amen-Ra Films, in 1991, and a subsidiary, Black Dot Media, to develop projects for film and television. Snipes has been training in martial arts since the age of 12, earning a 5th dan black belt in Shotokan karate and 2nd dan black belt in Hapkido. He is credited with helping popularize martial arts in Hollywood and bringing martial arts to mainstream audiences as well as contributing to the representation of Black actors in action roles, breaking stereotypes. In 2017, Snipes made his debut as a novelist with the urban fantasy Talon of God.

== Early life ==
Wesley Trent Snipes was born on July 31, 1962, in Orlando, Florida, the son of Wesley Rudolph Snipes, an aircraft engineer, and Marian (née Long), a teacher's assistant. He grew up in the James Monroe Houses in Soundview, Bronx, New York City. Snipes attended New York's High School of Performing Arts (later to become part of the Fiorello H. LaGuardia High School of Music & Art and Performing Arts), but returned to Florida before he could graduate. After graduating from Jones High School in Orlando, Snipes returned to New York and attended the State University of New York at Purchase, from which he received a bachelor's degree in fine arts. Snipes also attended Southwestern College in California.

== Career ==
=== Acting ===
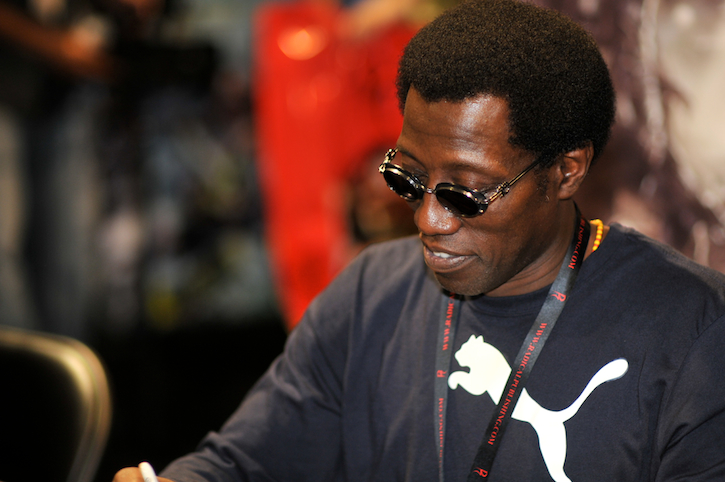
Snipes signing autographs at San Diego Comic-Con in 2010

At the age of 23, Snipes was discovered by an agent while performing in a competition. He made his film debut in the 1986 Goldie Hawn vehicle Wildcats. Later that year, he appeared on the TV show Miami Vice as a drug-dealing pimp in the episode "Streetwise" (first aired December 5, 1986). In 1987, he appeared as Michael Jackson's nemesis in the Martin Scorsese–directed music video "Bad" and the feature film Streets of Gold. That same year, Snipes was also considered for the role of Geordi La Forge in the TV series Star Trek: The Next Generation, but the role eventually went to LeVar Burton. Snipes auditioned and lobbied hard for the role of Leroy Green in the 1985 cult classic movie The Last Dragon, but the role was given to Taimak instead.

Snipes's performance in the music video "Bad" caught the eye of director Spike Lee. Snipes turned down a small role in Lee's Do the Right Thing for the larger part of Willie Mays Hayes in Major League (1989), beginning a succession of box-office hits for Snipes. Lee would later cast Snipes as the jazz saxophonist Shadow Henderson in Mo' Better Blues (1990) and as the lead in the interracial romance drama Jungle Fever (1991). After the success of Jungle Fever, The Washington Post described Snipes as "the most celebrated new actor of the season". He then played Thomas Flanagan in King of New York (1990) opposite Christopher Walken. He played the drug lord Nino Brown in New Jack City (1991), which was written specifically for him by Barry Michael Cooper. He also played a drug dealer in the 1994 film Sugar Hill.

Snipes has played several roles in action films, including Passenger 57 (1992), Rising Sun (1993), Demolition Man (1993) (with Sylvester Stallone), Drop Zone (1994), Money Train (1995), The Fan (1996), U.S. Marshals (1998) and The Art of War (2000), as well as comedies like White Men Can't Jump (1992), and To Wong Foo, Thanks for Everything! Julie Newmar (1995) where he played a drag queen. Snipes has appeared in additional dramas, such as The Waterdance (1992) and Disappearing Acts (2000).

In 1997, Snipes won the Best Actor Volpi Cup at the 54th Venice Film Festival for his performance in New Line Cinema's One Night Stand. In 1998, Snipes had his largest commercial success with Blade, appearing in the title role, based on the Marvel Comics character of the same name. Blade has grossed over $150 million worldwide and the film spawned a franchise. He also received a star on the Hollywood Walk of Fame and an honorary doctorate in humanities and fine arts from his alma mater, SUNY/Purchase. In 2002, Snipes reprised his role in Blade II, and in 2004, starred in a third film, Blade: Trinity, both of which he also produced. In 2005, Snipes sued New Line Cinema and David S. Goyer, the film's studio and director, respectively. He claimed that the studio did not pay his full salary, that he was intentionally cut out of casting decisions, and that his character's screen time was reduced in favor of co-stars Ryan Reynolds and Jessica Biel. The suit was later settled, but no details were released.

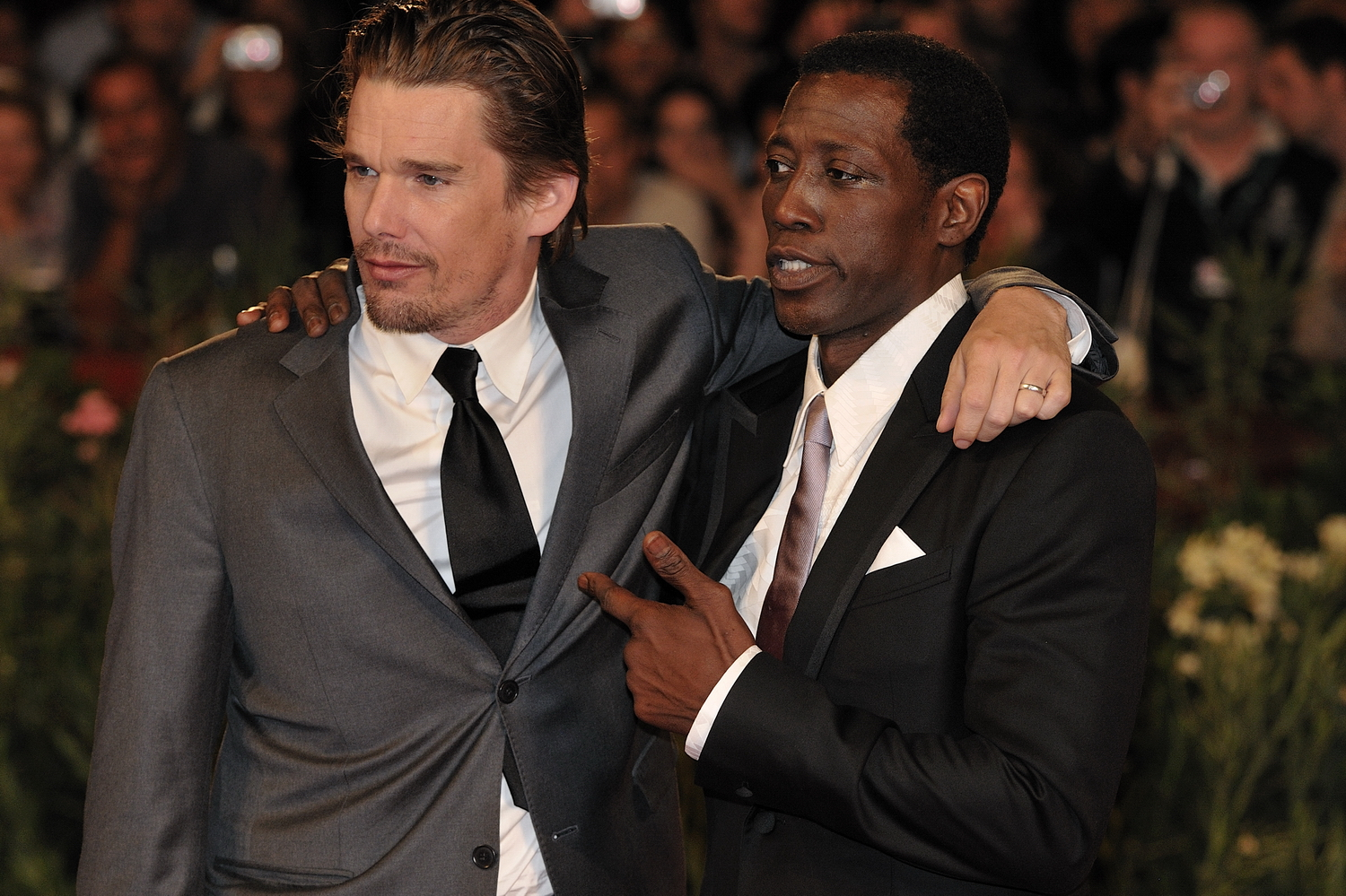
Snipes with Ethan Hawke during the 66th Venice International Film Festival

Snipes later appeared in The Contractor (2007), filmed in Bulgaria and the UK, Game of Death (2010), and Gallowwalkers (2012). Snipes was originally slated to play one of the four leads in Spike Lee's 2008 war film Miracle at St. Anna but had to leave the film due to tax problems; his role eventually went to Derek Luke.

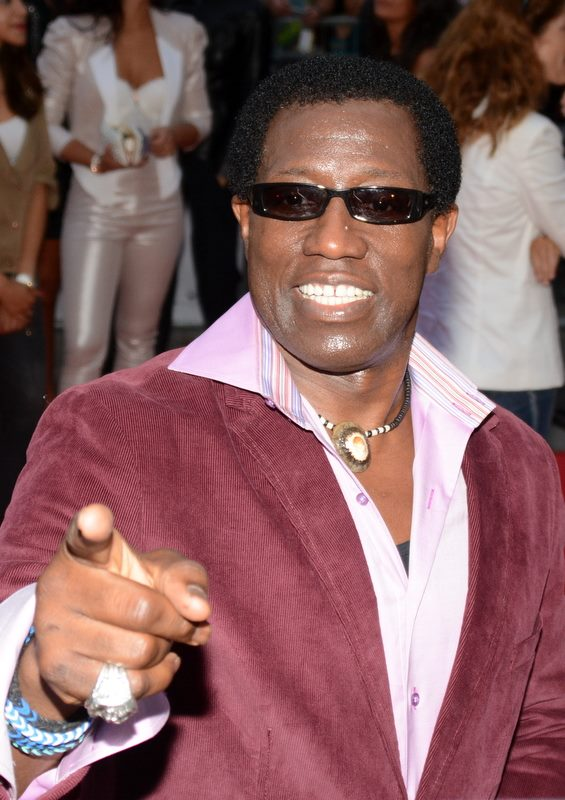
Snipes in 2014, at the French premiere of The Expendables 3

Snipes made a comeback performance in Brooklyn's Finest (2009) as Casanova "Caz" Phillips, a supporting character; it was his first theatrical release film since 2004. He also had to turn down the part of Hale Caesar in The Expendables because he was not allowed to leave the United States without the court's approval. In 2014, he appeared in the sequel The Expendables 3. His comedic role playing D'Urville Martin in Dolemite Is My Name earned him positive reviews and a number of award nominations.

In 2024, Snipes reprised his role as Blade after twenty years in the Marvel Studios film Deadpool & Wolverine, which integrated the character into the Marvel Cinematic Universe and reunited him with former Blade: Trinity co-star Ryan Reynolds. Reynolds texted Snipes about joining the film and he had to keep his appearance a secret from his family; his surprise reappearance in the film led to positive reactions from audiences. Following the film's release, Snipes received two Guinness World Records for the longest career as a live-action Marvel character, beating out Deadpool & Wolverine co-star Hugh Jackman as Wolverine, as well as for the longest gap between character appearances in Marvel films, beating Alfred Molina.

=== Other ventures ===
In the late 1990s, Snipes and his brother started a security firm called the Royal Guard of Amen-Ra, dedicated to providing VIPs with bodyguards trained in law enforcement and martial arts. Amen-Ra is also the name of his film company. In 1996, the first film produced by Amen-Ra was A Great And Mighty Walk – Dr. John Henrik Clarke.

In 2000, the business was investigated for alleged ties to the United Nuwaubian Nation of Moors. It emerged that Snipes had spotted 200 acres (81 ha) of land near their Tama-Re compound in Putnam County, Georgia, intending to buy and use it for his business academy. Both Snipes's business and the groups used Egyptian motifs as their symbols. Ultimately, Snipes and his brother did not buy the land, instead establishing their company in Florida, Antigua, and Africa.

In 2005, Snipes entered into negotiations to fight Fear Factor host Joe Rogan on Ultimate Fighting Match, but the deal fell through.

In 2010, Snipes co-created the sci-fi comic series After Dark with Antoine Fuqua. In 2017, he made his debut as a novelist with the urban fantasy supernatural adventure Talon of God. In 2022, he returned to comics with The Exiled.

== Personal life ==
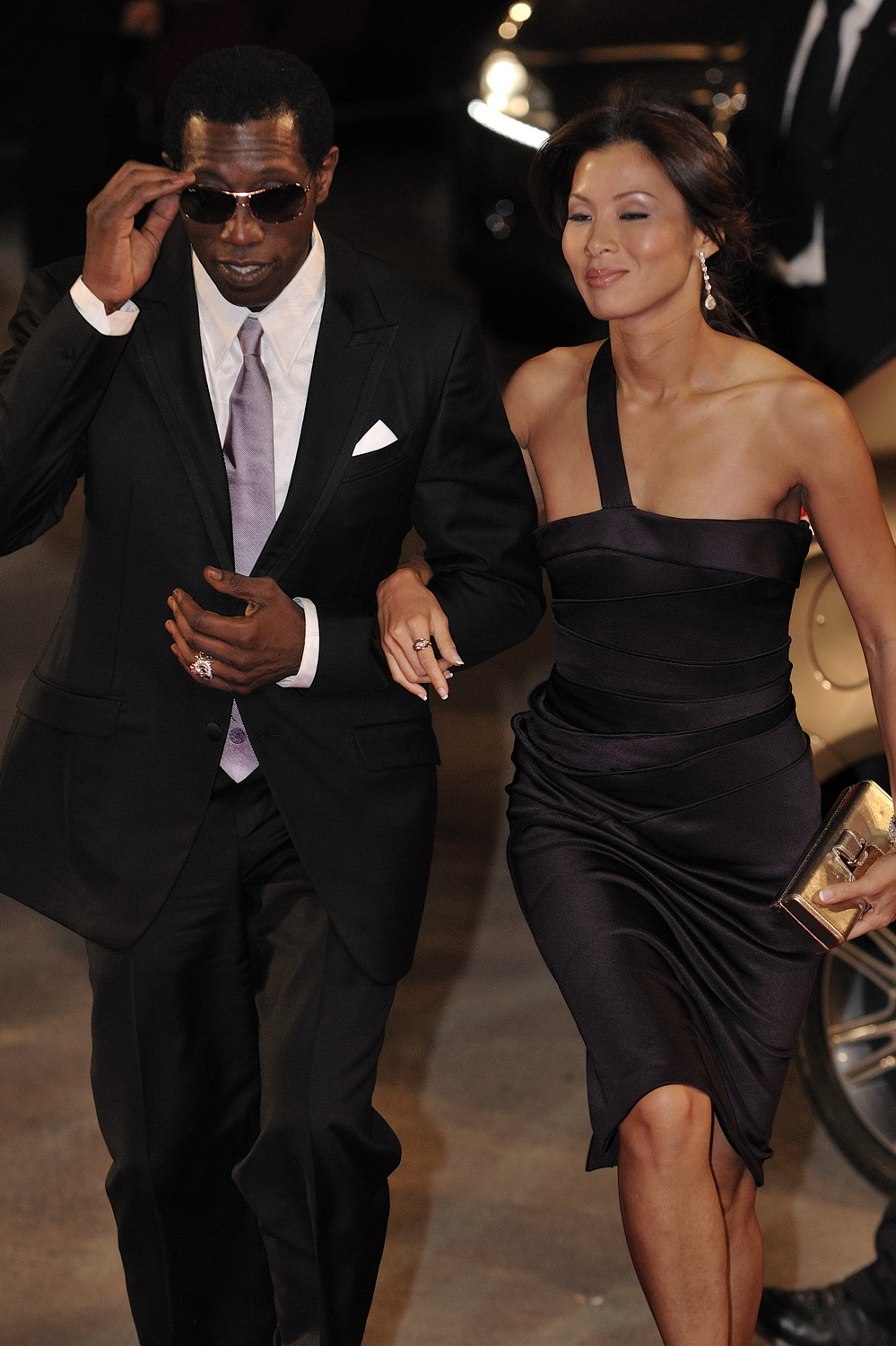
Snipes with wife Nikki Park in 2009

Snipes began training in martial arts when he was 12 years old in 1974. He has a 5th degree black belt in Shotokan karate and a 2nd degree black belt in Hapkido. He has also trained in Capoeira under Mestre Jelon Vieira and in a number of other disciplines including Kung Fu at the USA Shaolin Temple, Brazilian Jiu Jitsu, and kickboxing. During his time in New York, Snipes was trained in fighting by his friend and mentor Brooke Ellis. Snipes is also trained in Arnis.

Snipes, who was raised a Christian, converted to Islam in 1978, but left Islam in 1988. During a 1991 interview, Snipes said "Islam made me more conscious of what African people have accomplished, of my self-worth, and gave me some self-dignity".

Snipes has been married twice, first to April Dubois, with whom he has a son, Jelani Asar Snipes, born in 1988. In 2003, Snipes married painter Nakyung "Nikki" Park, with whom he has four children.

Snipes was known for abusive behavior with women, including allegations made by Halle Berry.

In 2001, Snipes' apartment in New York City was destroyed by the collapse of the World Trade Center during the September 11 attacks. He was on the West Coast at the time.

== Legal issues ==
In 2005, Snipes was investigated by the South African Police Service after he was found to have a counterfeit South African passport while attempting to leave O. R. Tambo International Airport in Johannesburg. As he has a valid and genuine U.S passport, authorities allowed him to depart, but he was classified as an "undesirable person" for immigration purposes by the South African Department of Home Affairs.

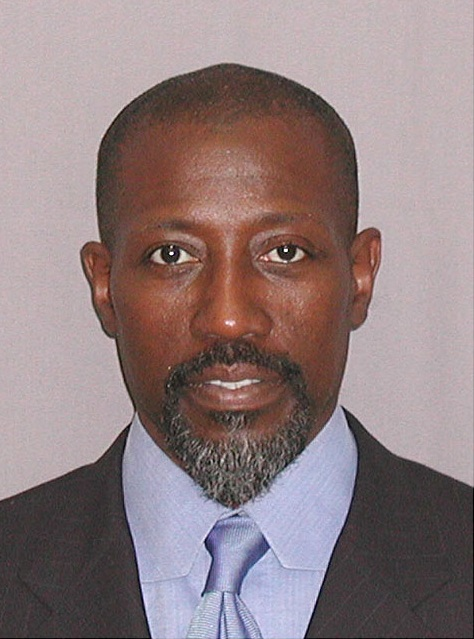
Mugshot of Snipes taken by the United States Marshals Service in 2008

=== Tax evasion and charges ===
In 2008, Snipes was convicted on misdemeanor charges of willful failure to file federal income tax returns, and was sentenced to three years' imprisonment. After an unsuccessful appeal, he served 28 months in federal prison. He was released in April 2013. On October 12, 2006, Snipes, Eddie Ray Kahn, and Douglas P. Rosile were charged with conspiring to defraud the United States and knowingly making or aiding and abetting the making of a false and fraudulent claim for payment against the United States. Snipes was also charged with willfully failing to file timely federal income tax returns.

The conspiracy charge against Snipes alleged that he agreed with Kahn and Rosile to file false amended returns for 1996 and 1997, including false tax refund claims totaling over $11.3 million for the two years. The government alleged that Snipes, on Kahn's advice and with Rosile's assistance, attempted to obtain fraudulent tax refunds using a tax protester theory called the "861 argument" (an argument that the domestic income of US citizens and residents is not taxable). The government alleged that Snipes sent three fictitious "bills of exchange" for $14 million to the Internal Revenue Service (IRS).

The indictment also charged that Snipes failed to file tax returns for any of the years 1999 through 2004. Snipes responded to his indictment in a letter on December 4, 2006, declaring himself to be "a non-resident alien" of the United States for tax purposes; in reality, Snipes is a U.S citizen by birth.

==== Trial and sentencing ====
Following a jury trial, Snipes was acquitted on February 1, 2008, of the felony count of conspiracy to defraud the United States and on the felony count of filing a false claim with the government. He was found guilty on three misdemeanor counts of failing to file federal income tax returns, and acquitted on three other failure-to-file charges. His co-defendants, Douglas P. Rosile and Eddie Ray Kahn, were convicted on the conspiracy and false claim charges.

On April 24, 2008, Snipes was sentenced by Judge William Terrell Hodges to the maximum allowable term of three years in prison for the three misdemeanor counts. Kahn was sentenced to ten years in prison, while Rosile was sentenced to four and a half years in prison. The US Court of Appeals for the Eleventh Circuit affirmed Snipes's convictions in a 35-page decision issued on July 16, 2010.

Snipes reported to federal prison on December 9, 2010, to begin his three-year sentence. He was held at McKean Federal Correctional Institution. On June 6, 2011, the US Supreme Court declined to hear Snipes's appeal, which had challenged the venue for the counts of failure to file returns. Snipes was released from federal prison on April 2, 2013, after serving 28 months, finishing his period of house arrest on July 19, 2013.

== Publications ==
- After Dark (comics, co-created with Antoine Fuqua; 2010)
- Talon of God (novel, co-written with Ray Norman; 2017)
- The Exiled (comics, co-created with Adam Lawson & Keith Arem; 2022)

== Awards and nominations ==
Award	Category	Title	Result
CableACE Awards	Best Actor in a Dramatic Series	Vietnam War Story	Won
MTV Movie Awards	Best Villain	New Jack City	Nominated
Image Awards	Outstanding Lead Actor in a Motion Picture	New Jack City	Won
Gold Special Jury Award	Best Actors (shared with Eric Stoltz and William Forsythe)	The Waterdance	Won
Independent Spirit Awards	Best Supporting Actor	The Waterdance	Nominated
MTV Movie Awards	Best Screen Duo (shared with Woody Harrelson)	White Men Can't Jump	Nominated
MTV Movie Awards	Best Villain	Demolition Man	Nominated
Image Awards	Outstanding Lead Actor in a Television Movie or Mini-Series	America's Dream	Won
Venice Film Festival	Best Actor (Volpi Cup)	One Night Stand	Won
Blockbuster Entertainment Awards	Favorite Duo – Action/Adventure (shared with Tommy Lee Jones)	U.S. Marshals	Nominated
Blockbuster Entertainment Awards	Favorite Actor – Horror	Blade	Won
MTV Movie Awards	Best Fight	Blade	Nominated
Hollywood Walk of Fame	Motion pictures star	All film work	Won
Black Reel Awards	Network/Cable – Best Actor	Disappearing Acts	Nominated
Black Reel Awards	Best Actor (Motion Picture)	Undisputed	Nominated
Black Reel Awards	Best Supporting Actor	Brooklyn's Finest	Won
Image Awards	Outstanding Actor in a Drama Series	The Player	Nominated
DFCS Awards	Best Supporting Actor	Dolemite Is My Name	Nominated
SDFCS Awards	Best Comedic Performance	Dolemite Is My Name	Won
SDFCS Awards	Best Supporting Actor	Dolemite Is My Name	Nominated
SDFCS Awards	Best Supporting Actor	Dolemite Is My Name	Nominated
Black Reel Awards	Outstanding Supporting Actor	Dolemite Is My Name	Won
