= List of Bulgarian films of the 2020s =

A list of the most notable films produced in Bulgaria during the 2020s ordered by year of release. For an alphabetical list of articles on Bulgarian films, see Category:Bulgarian films.

== List ==
=== 2020 ===
Title	English title	Director	Cast	Genre	Notes
Страх	Fear	Ivaylo Hristov	Svetlana Yancheva, Michael Flemming	Drama	Bulgarian entry for the Best International Feature Film at the 94th Academy Awards
Като за последно	Last Call	Ivaylo Penchev	Vasil Banov, Maria Bakalova, Phillip Avramov, Malin Krastev, Stefan Denolyubev, Kitodar Todorov, Svezhen Mladenov, Gerasim Georgiev	Satire, Black comedy, Comedy-drama	Nominated - Best Film at the 2020 Golden Rose Film Festival Winner - Audience Award at the 2020 Golden Rose Film Festival

=== 2021 ===
Title	English title	Director	Cast	Genre	Notes
Докато мога да вървя	As Far as I Can Walk	Stefan Arsenijević	Ibrahim Koma, Nancy Mensah-Offei, Maxim Khalil, Rami Farah	Drama	Winner - Crystal Globe Grand Prix at the 55th Karlovy Vary International Film Festival Winner - Best Actor for Ibrahim Koma at the 55th Karlovy Vary International Film Festival
Рибена кост	Fishbone	Dragomir Sholev	Deyan Donkov, Suzy Radichkova, Valentin Andreev	Fantasy, Drama	Winner - Best Cinematographer at the 2021 Golden Rose National Film Festival Winner - Union of Bulgarian Filmmakers’ Award - Best Feature Film at the 2021 Golden Rose National Film Festival
В сърцето на машината	In the Heart of the Machine	Martin Makariev	Alexander Sano, Hristo Shopov, Igor Angelov, Ivaylo Hristov, Julian Vergov, Hristo Petkov, Stoyan Doychev, Vladimir Zombori, Bashar Rahal	Thriller, Drama	Bulgarian entry for the Best International Feature Film at the 95th Academy Awards Winner - Best Feature Film at the 2021 Golden Rose Film Festival
Петя на моята Петя	Petya of My Petya	Alexander Kossev	Albena Pavlova, Vasil Banov, Yasen Atanasov, Martin Metodiev, Yulian Vergov, Aleksandra Kostova, Alisa Atanasova, Alena Vergova	Drama	Winner - Best First Feature at the 2021 Golden Rose Bulgarian Feature Film Festival Winner - Best Actress for Aleksandra Kostova at the 2021 Golden Rose Bulgarian Feature Film Festival
Жените наистина плачат	Women Do Cry	Vesela Kazakova, Mina Mileva	Maria Bakalova, Vesela Kazakova, Bilyana Kazakova, Iossif Surchadzhiev, Ralitsa Stoyanova, Dobriela Popova, Katia Kazakova, Rositza Gevrenova, Siana Georgieva, Dragomir Kostadinov	Drama	Nominated - Un Certain Regard at the 2021 Cannes Film Festival

=== 2022 ===
Title	English title	Director	Cast	Genre	Notes
Oameni de treaba (Romanian)	Men of Deeds	Paul Negoescu	Iulian Postelnicu, Vasile Muraru, Anghel Damian, Crina Semciuc, Daniel Busuioc, Oana Tudor, Vitalie Bichir	Black comedy, Comedy-drama	
ф 1.618	Phi 1.618	Theodore Ushev	Deyan Donkov, Martina Apostolova, Irmena Chichikova, Nikolay Stanoev	Dystopian, Science fiction, Adventure	Winner - Best Costume Design at the 2022 Cinelibri International Book&Movie Festival Nominated - New Alchemist Award - Feature Film at the 2022 Festival du nouveau cinéma
Шекспир като улично куче	Shakespeare Like A Street Dog	Valeri Yordanov	Vladislav Stoimenov, Zahari Baharov, Vasil Iliev, Eleonora Ivanova	Drama	Winner - Best Director at the 2022 Golden Rose Film Festival Winner - Best Screenplay at the 2022 Golden Rose Film Festival Winner - Best Actor for Vladislav Stoimenov & Vasil Iliev at the 2022 Golden Rose Film Festival
Борсови играчи	SpeculatorS	Georgi D. Kostov	Aleksandar Aleksiev, Daniel Angelov, Boryana Bratoeva, Darin Angelov, Marian Valev, Dimitar Banenkin, Radina Kardjilova	Thriller, Drama	
Vasil		Avelina Prat	Ivan Barnev, Karra Elejalde, Alexandra Jiménez, Susi Sánchez, Sue Flack	Comedy-drama	

=== 2021 ===
Title	English title	Director	Cast	Genre	Notes
Докато мога да вървя	As Far as I Can Walk	Stefan Arsenijević	Ibrahim Koma, Nancy Mensah-Offei, Maxim Khalil, Rami Farah	Drama	Winner - Crystal Globe Grand Prix at the 55th Karlovy Vary International Film Festival Winner - Best Actor for Ibrahim Koma at the 55th Karlovy Vary International Film Festival
Рибена кост	Fishbone	Dragomir Sholev	Deyan Donkov, Suzy Radichkova, Valentin Andreev	Fantasy, Drama	Winner - Best Cinematographer at the 2021 Golden Rose National Film Festival Winner - Union of Bulgarian Filmmakers’ Award - Best Feature Film at the 2021 Golden Rose National Film Festival
В сърцето на машината	In the Heart of the Machine	Martin Makariev	Alexander Sano, Hristo Shopov, Igor Angelov, Ivaylo Hristov, Julian Vergov, Hristo Petkov, Stoyan Doychev, Vladimir Zombori, Bashar Rahal	Thriller, Drama	Bulgarian entry for the Best International Feature Film at the 95th Academy Awards Winner - Best Feature Film at the 2021 Golden Rose Film Festival
Петя на моята Петя	Petya of My Petya	Alexander Kossev	Albena Pavlova, Vasil Banov, Yasen Atanasov, Martin Metodiev, Yulian Vergov, Aleksandra Kostova, Alisa Atanasova, Alena Vergova	Drama	Winner - Best First Feature at the 2021 Golden Rose Bulgarian Feature Film Festival Winner - Best Actress for Aleksandra Kostova at the 2021 Golden Rose Bulgarian Feature Film Festival
Жените наистина плачат	Women Do Cry	Vesela Kazakova, Mina Mileva	Maria Bakalova, Vesela Kazakova, Bilyana Kazakova, Iossif Surchadzhiev, Ralitsa Stoyanova, Dobriela Popova, Katia Kazakova, Rositza Gevrenova, Siana Georgieva, Dragomir Kostadinov	Drama	Nominated - Un Certain Regard at the 2021 Cannes Film Festival

=== 2024 ===
Title	English title	Director	Cast	Genre	Notes
Защото обичам лошото време	Because I Love Bad Weather	Yana Lekarska	Neda Spasova, Vladimir Mihaylov, Boryana Puncheva, Eleni Dekidis, Ivan Barnev, Veselin Rankov	Comedy-drama, Romance	
Стадото	Tarika	Milko Lazarov	Vesela Valcheva, Zahari Baharov, Ivan Savov, Marko Nokov, Ivan Barnev, Mimoza Bazova, Valeria Varbanova, Christos Stergioglou, Nina Goranovski, Julian Vergov, Vesko Petkov, Petar Sardzhev, Ina Kichkova, Maria Lazarova, Konstantin Lazarov	Drama	
Триумф	Triumph	Kristina Grozeva, Petar Valchanov	Maria Bakalova, Julian Kostov, Julian Vergov, Margita Gosheva, Stanislav Ganchev, Ivan Savov, Ivan Barnev	Black comedy	

=== 2026 ===
Title	English title	Director	Cast	Genre	Notes
Bear with Me		Martin Genovski	Maxy Niedermeyer, Natasha the Bear	Documentary	World premiere at the 32nd Sarajevo Film Festival
