= The Tree of Life (TV series) =

- Дървото на живота
- Genre: Drama; Family; History
- Based on: Genesis by Vladimir Zarev
- Written by: Ivan Spasov; Hristina Apostolova; Angel Nakov; Svetoslav Tomov; Kalina Daskalova; Lachezar Avramov; Dimitar Stoyanovich
- Directed by: Todor Chapkunov
- Starring: Iossif Surchadzhiev; Maria Kavardzhikova; Hristo Shopov; Vladimir Karamazov; Bashar Rahal; Monyo Monev; Koyna Ruseva; Ivan Stamenov; Luiza Grigorova; Anastasiya Ingilizova; Aleksandra Lopez; Teodora Duhovnikova
- Country of origin: Bulgaria
- Original language: Bulgarian
- No. of seasons: 2
- No. of episodes: 24

Production
- Executive producer: Dream Team Films
- Producers: Evtim Miloshev; Lyubo Neikov
- Running time: 45 minutes (season 1); 70 minutes (season 2)

Original release
- Network: TV7
- Release: March 3 – December 8, 2013

The Tree of Life on Bulgarian Дървото на живота (Darvoto na zhivota) is a Bulgarian historical drama of TV7. Executive producers are Evtim Miloshev and Lyubomir Neikov with new company Dream Team Films. "The Tree of Life" aired in prime-time on TV7, as the first Bulgarian historical series in the recent history of the country. In the series involved some of the most famous Bulgarian actors. Director of the series Todor Chapkanov and responsible operator Lorenzo Senator.

== Story ==
The story developed after the Independence of Bulgaria - 1908 and ends in 1925 after the Attack in the Church Saint Kral. The action follows the story of a crowded and affluent family background of key Bulgarian history events. In production is entangled many family dramas and wars between family members.

== Seasons ==
Seasons	Timeslot	TV Season	Episodes	Premiere	Final	Duration
1	Sunday, 8 PM	2013 (Spring)	12	March 3, 2013	May 26, 2013	45 minutes (no ads)
2	Sunday, 9 PM	2013 (Fall)	12	September 22, 2013	December 8, 2013	70 minutes (no ads)

On May 22, 2013, start filming the second season of the series.

== Characters ==
- Asen Valchev (Iossif Surchadzhiev) - head of the family
- Petruna Valcheva (Maria Kavardzhikova)
- Panto Valchev (Vladimir Karamazov)
- Yordan Valchev (Hristo Shopov) - officer of the Bulgarian army and rebel in Macedonia
- Hristo Valchev (Bashar Rahal)
- Iliya Valchev (Monyo Monev)
- Bela Valcheva (Koyna Ruseva) - wife of Todor
- Todor Lozanchev (Ivan Stamenov) - born in Ohrid, husband of Bela, an officer of the Bulgarian army and rebel in Macedonia
- General Aleksandar Protogerov (Yozif Shamli) - leader of VMRO
- Yana (Luiza Grigorova) - maid in the home of the family Valchevi
- Anastasiya Ingilizova (Evdokia Hadzhikonstantinova)
- Aleksandra Lopez (Azra Alton)
- Bojura (Teodora Duhovnikova)
- Lawyer Kamenov (Vasil Banov)
- Elena Kamemova (Hristina Apostolova) - secretly infatuated by Hristo Valchev
- Fatih (Velislav Pavlov) - Azra's brother, a traitor to the detachment of Todor and Jordan
- Voiceover (Vasil Binev) - heir of the clan Valchevi, telling family history

== Original sound track ==
The original sound track is created by the Bulgarian composer Georgi Strezov. The series includes the works: "Main Titles", "Todor And Bella", "Family Apart", "Yordan And Azra", "Love", "In the tavern".
