= In the Heart of the Machine =

2022 Bulgarian film by Martin Makariev

- Theatrical release poster
- Directed by: Martin Makariev
- Screenplay by: Boby Zahariev
- Story by: Martin Makariev
- Produced by: Alexander Penev; Martin Makariev
- Starring: Alexander Sano; Hristo Shopov; Igor Angelov; Ivaylo Hristov; Julian Vergov; Hristo Petkov; Stoyan Doychev; Vladimir Zombori; Bashar Rahal
- Cinematography: Andrei Andreev
- Edited by: Nikola Milenov
- Music by: Victor Stoyanov
- Production company: Forward Pictures
- Distributed by: 101 Films International, Silvernoise
- Release dates: 26 September 2021 (Varna); 18 March 2022 (Bulgaria)
- Running time: 115 minutes
- Country: Bulgaria
- Language: Bulgarian
- Box office: $708,260

In the Heart of the Machine (Bulgarian: В сърцето на машината) is a 2021 Bulgarian thriller drama film directed by Martin Makariev from a screenplay co-written with Boby Zahariev. The film features an ensemble cast that includes Alexander Sano, Hristo Shopov, Igor Angelov, Ivaylo Hristov, Julian Vergov, Hristo Petkov, Stoyan Doychev, Vladimir Zombori and Bashar Rahal.

The film won the Best Feature Film award at the 2021 Golden Rose Film Festival and the 2022 Sofia Film Fest. It was selected as the Bulgarian entry for the Best International Feature Film at the 95th Academy Awards, but was not nominated.

== Plot ==
In 1978, Bohemy, a young prisoner serving at the Central Prison in Sofia, is given a chance to shorten his sentence if he gathers a crew to double production during their work at the Kremikovtsi plant. He assembles a team composed of the Hatchet, a terrible double murderer, the problematic criminal the Needle, the elderly Teacher and the gypsy Krasy. Their problems begin when the Hatchet refuses to turn on his lathe because a pigeon is stuck inside it. Despite Captain Vekilsky, the plant's warden, ordering him to turn on the lathe, the Hatchet categorically refuses, takes the rookie warden Kovachky hostage, and announces that he will not start work until the pigeon is rescued.

The situation quickly escalates and becomes increasingly complicated after more guards arrive and the Teacher is killed in an attempt to negotiate with them. Gradually, the prisoners realise that the only way to deal with the situation is to rescue the bird as the Hatchet wishes.

== Cast ==
- Alexander Sano as Bohemy
- Hristo Shopov as Colonel Radoev
- Igor Angelov as Satura / the Hatchet
- Ivaylo Hristov as Daskala / the Teacher
- Julian Vergov as Captain Vekilsky
- Hristo Petkov as Iglata / the Needle
- Stoyan Doychev as Krasy / the Gypsy
- Vladimir Zombori as Private Kovachky
- Bashar Rahal as Captain Kozarev

== Release ==
The film premiered on 26 September 2021 at the 39th Golden Rose Film Festival, and was released in theatres on 18 March 2022.

== Accolades ==
Award	Date of ceremony	Category	Recipient(s)	Result	Ref(s)
Golden Rose Film Festival	29 September 2021	Best Feature Film	Alexander Penev	Won	
Golden Rose Film Festival	29 September 2021	Best Screenplay	Boby Zahariev	Won	
Sofia Film Fest	21 March 2022	Best Feature Film	Alexander Penev	Won	

== See also ==
- List of submissions to the 95th Academy Awards for Best International Feature Film
- List of Bulgarian submissions for the Academy Award for Best International Feature Film
