= Path of Destruction =

Path of Destruction may refer to:

- Path of Destruction (film), a 2005 made-for-TV film
- "Path of Destruction" (Thunderbirds episode)
- Star Wars: Darth Bane: Path of Destruction, a novel
