= Eurimages Audentia Award =

The Eurimages Audentia Award is an annual film award, presented by Eurimages to honour films by emerging women filmmakers. The award is presented at a different international film festival each year, to a film screening within that year's festival program.

== Winners ==
Year	Film	Director(s)	Host festival	Ref
2016	The Magic Mountain	Anca Damian	Istanbul	
2017	Milla	Valérie Massadian	Locarno	
2018	Fig Tree	Alamork Davidian	Toronto	
2019	Lucky One	Mia Engberg	Göteborg	
2020	Garage People (Garagenvolk)	Natalija Yefimkina	Sarajevo	
2021	The Crossing (La Traversée)	Florence Miailhe	FNC Montreal	
2022	Women Do Cry	Vesela Kazakova, Mina Mileva	Trieste	
2023	Smoke Sauna Sisterhood	Anna Hints	Beldocs	
2024	There's Still Tomorrow (C'è ancora domani)	Paola Cortellesi	Haugesund	
2025	Solomamma	Janicke Askevold	Cork	
2026	TBA		Crime and Punishment (Turkey)	
2027	TBA		Reykjavik	
2028	TBA		Sofia DocuMental (Bulgaria)	
2029	TBA		St. John's	
