= Iossif Surchadzhiev =

Bulgarian actor (1945–2026)

Yosif Surchadzhiev
- Йосиф Сърчаджиев
- Born: 2 May 1945; Sofia, Bulgaria
- Died: 1 July 2026 (aged 81); Sofia, Bulgaria
- Education: National Academy for Theatre and Film Arts
- Occupation: Actor
- Years active: 1952–2021
- Children: 2, including Aleksandra

Yosif Stefanov Surchadzhiev (Bulgarian: Йосиф Стефанов Сърчаджиев; 2 May 1945 – 1 July 2026) was a Bulgarian stage and film actor. He appeared in more than fifty films since making his screen debut in 1952.

== Life and career ==
Surchadzhiev was born in Sofia on 2 May 1945, to director Stefan Sarchadzhiev, founder of the Satirical Theatre, and Anna Fadenhecht, daughter of lawyer and politician Yosif Fadenhecht. His mother was of Jewish descent. In 1970, he graduated from the National Academy for Theatre and Film Arts. After graduating, he performed in various stage productions around Bulgaria.

He was a member of the Union of Bulgarian Artists and the Union of Bulgarian Filmmakers since 1973.

In 2004, Surchadzhiev suffered a severe stroke, from which he recovered for years. His wife Raina Tomova, with whom he had a daughter, is a screenwriter. He had an estranged daughter, Aleksandra Sarchadjieva, from his relationship with actress Pepa Nikolova.

In 2013, he appeared in the TV7 period drama series The Tree of Life.

Surchadzhiev died on 1 July 2026, at the age of 81.

== Selected filmography ==
=== Film ===
Year	Title	Role	Notes
1971	Wrathful Journey	Chavdar	
1981	Khan Asparuh	Constantine IV	
1986	Where Are You Going?	Strezov	
1988	Time of Violence	Kara Ibrahim	
2001	Druids	Guistus the Roman	
2011	Avé	Viktor's father	
2021	Women Do Cry	The Father	

=== Television ===
Year	Title	Role	Notes
2013	The Tree of Life	Asen Vulchev	Main role
