= Soundtrack (disambiguation) =

A soundtrack is recorded music accompanying and synchronized to the images of a motion picture, television program or video game.

Soundtrack or The Soundtrack may also refer to:

== Music ==
- Soundtrack (Charles Lloyd album), 1969
- Soundtracks (Can album), 1970
- Soundtrack (Fullerton College Jazz Band album), 1990
- Soundtracks for the Blind, 1996 album by Swans
- Soundtrack (Guy Barker album), 2002
- Soundtrack (Modern English album), 2010
- The Taking (album) (working title: The Soundtrack), an album by Loaded, 2011
- Soundtrack (Wizards of Oz album), 1988
- Soundtrack (EP), a 2022 EP by Fastball
- "Soundtrack", an instrumental song by Linkin Park from the 2011 LP Underground Eleven
- "The Soundtrack" (The Game song), 2014 single

== Other uses ==
- Soundtrack (film), a 2011 Bollywood drama
- Soundtrack Pro, from 2003, an audio editor
- Soundtrack '08, a one-time 2008 music festival
- Soundtrack (TV series), a 2019 Netflix musical drama
- Soundtrack #1, a 2022 South Korean streaming television series
  - Soundtrack #2, a 2023 South Korean streaming television series

== See also ==
- Audio signal, audio channel or audio track, a component of a sound recording
- Original Soundtrack (disambiguation)
- Soundtrack album
