= Mina Mileva =

Bulgarian filmmaker

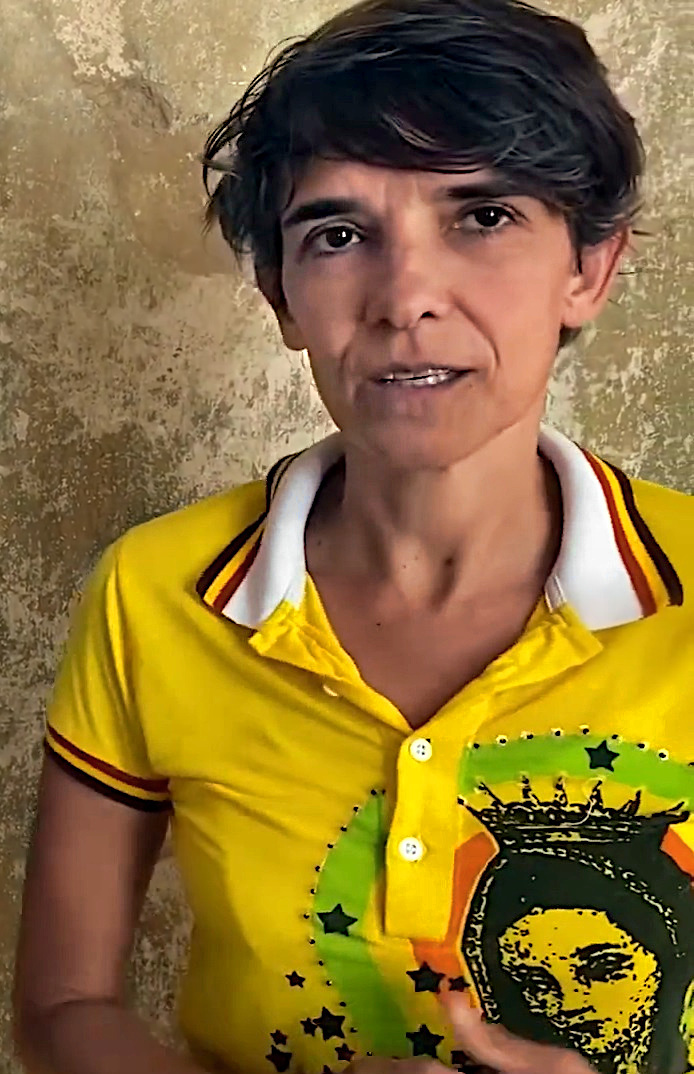
- Mileva in 2020
- Born: Mina Nikolova Mileva
- Education: National Academy for Theatre and Film Arts (BA); La Cambre (MFA)
- Occupations: Animator; screenwriter; director; producer
- Years active: 1999–present

Mina Nikolova Mileva (Bulgarian: Мина Николова Милева) is a Bulgarian director and animator. She is best known for her cinematography in Cat in the Wall (2019) and Women Do Cry (2021) alongside directing partner Vesela Kazakova.

== Life and career ==
Mileva studied animation at the National Academy for Theatre and Film Arts in Sofia, and at La Cambre in Brussels. She has lived in London since 1997, working as a freelance animator. After relocating to the United Kingdom, Mileva entered the British animation industry, and worked as animation director, animator and line producer for films, commercials and TV series. In 2008, she set up the production company Activist 38 with Vesela Kazakova.

The pair's documentary Uncle Tony, Three Fools and the Secret Service (2014) caused major controversy in Bulgaria, but it also achieved prestigious selections and awards. It premiered at Sarajevo Film Festival, and later made it to several other festivals such as Warsaw Film Festival and Cairo Film Festival. Writing for Variety, Jay Weissberg noted that the film made good use of the wealth of material, and praised the music. Uncle Tony, Three Fools and the Secret Service was picked by the American Film Institute for their showcase "Best of European cinema 2014. Despite receiving a lot of controversy, the film was screened in Bulgarian cinemas for seven months and received numerous international awards.

In 2019, she directed Cat in the Wall alongside Kazakova. The film was presented in the official competition of the Locarno Film Festival and at South by Southwest in the United States. It received the FIPRESCI prize from the Warsaw Film Festival.

In 2021, she paired up with Kazakova again to direct Women Do Cry. This film was selected to compete in the Un Certain Regard section at the Cannes Film Festival, and was also screened at South by Southwest and the Glasgow Film Festival. It was the winner of the Eurimages Audentia Award at the Trieste Film Festival in 2022.

== Selected filmography ==
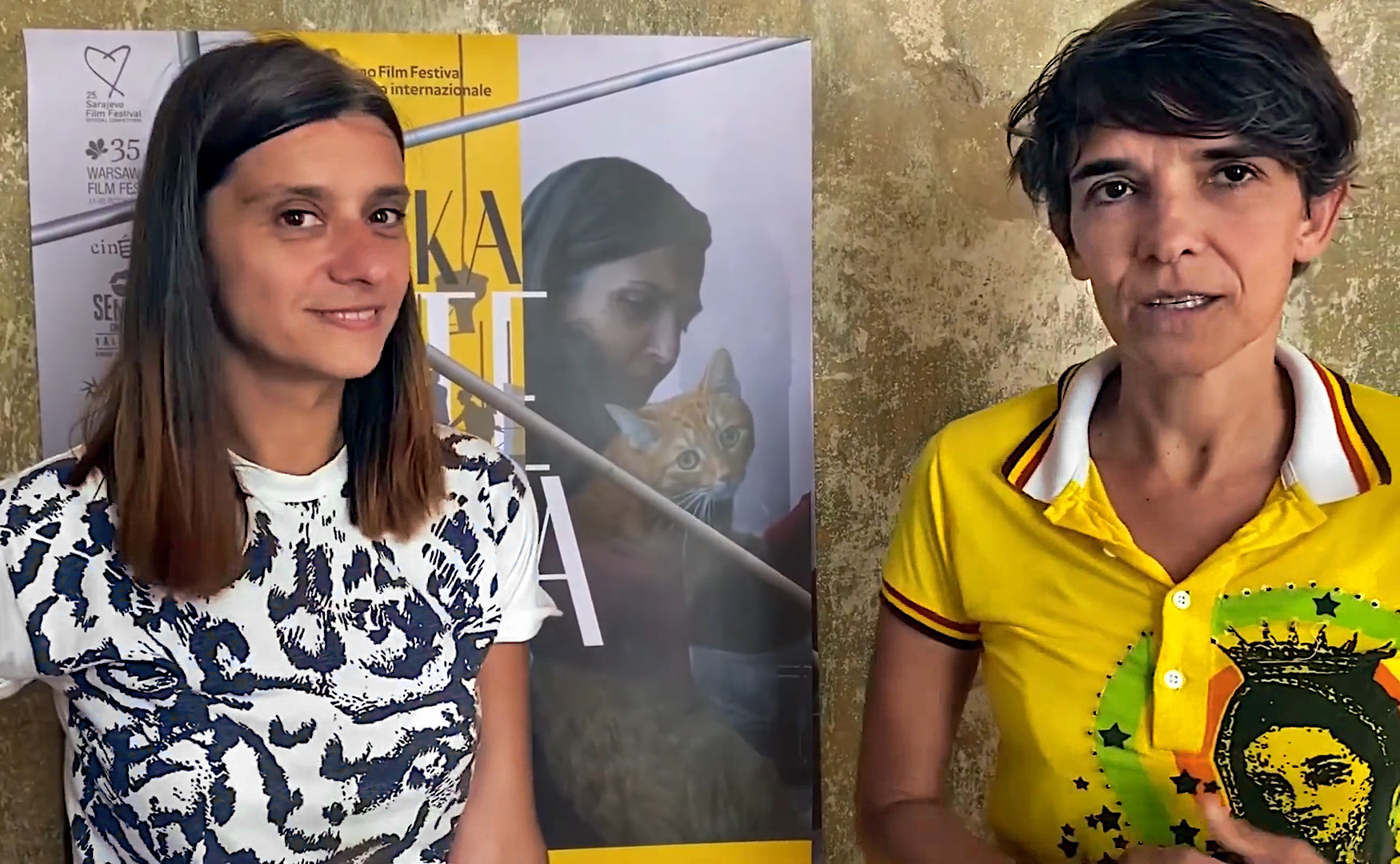
Mina Mileva & Vesela Kazakova represent Cat in the Wall at the 2020 Braunschweig International Film Festival

Year	Title	Credited as		Notes
Year	Title	Director	Writer	Notes
2008	Zaradi lelia Sneje	Yes	No	Documentary
2014	Uncle Tony, Three Fools and the Secret Service	Yes	Yes	Documentary
2016	The Beast is Still Alive	Yes	Yes	Documentary
2019	Cat in the Wall	No	Yes	
2021	Women Do Cry	Yes	Yes	
