= Major Riddle =

American casino owner

Major Arteburn Riddle (born 1906 or 1907; died July 8, 1980) was an American businessperson who owned several casinos in the Las Vegas area.

Riddle was born in Louisville, Kentucky. At the age of 11, he moved with his family to Indianapolis. There, he eventually started working in his father's trucking and manufacturing businesses. By 1936, he was involved in an Indianapolis-area nightclub with illegal gambling, which was linked to mobster Al Capone and his Chicago Outfit. In 1940, he became involved with another gambling club in Moline, Illinois. Around this time, he was romantically linked to mob figure Virginia Hill. Riddle moved to Chicago in the 1940s.

Riddle made a fortune in the 1930s and 1940s with an oil and gas drilling company in Texas. He also owned a trucking company in Evansville, Indiana, from 1937 to 1954.

Riddle started his Las Vegas casino career in 1956, when he took over the Dunes. Riddle and his co-investors substantially expanded the hotel using loans from the mob-influenced Teamsters pension fund. He was also noted for booking the first topless showgirl revue in Las Vegas, Minsky's Follies, into the casino.

He opened the Silver Nugget casino in North Las Vegas in 1964. Around 1975, he took over the Riata Club and reopened it as the Silver City Casino. In 1977, he took over operation of the Thunderbird hotel casino and renamed it as the Silver Bird. In 1978, he opened the casino at the Holiday International, under a lease from the hotel.

In 1963, Riddle wrote The Weekend Gambler's Handbook, a book of advice for casino gamblers. It became popular, despite containing some advice that was based on superstition rather than mathematics. After the book's publication, he appeared as himself on the June 24, 1963, episode of To Tell the Truth, receiving two of the four possible votes.

In the late 1960s, Riddle became romantically involved with Violetta Villas, whom he had helped bring to Las Vegas to perform at the Dunes Hotel and Casino. According to Villas's son, Riddle was a wealthy and influential man who wanted to marry the singer. Riddle was portrayed by Bulgarian actor Hristo Shopov in the 2026 biographical film Violetta Villas.

Riddle's son, Charles, died of suicide in 1966 at the age of 18.

Riddle died on July 8, 1980, at Cedars-Sinai Hospital in Los Angeles, from pneumonia after suffering from a rare blood disease.

Soon after his death, Riddle's casinos went into bankruptcy. The Silverbird and the Holiday International closed down, and the Silver Nugget and Silver City were sold off. Riddle's estate sold his remaining shares in the Dunes around 1984.
