= Ralitsa Stoyanova =

Bulgarian actress

- Ралица Стоянова
- Born: Ralitsa Georgieva Stoyanova; 23 May 1989 (age 35); Sofia, Bulgaria
- Education: National Academy for Theatre and Film Arts (BA)
- Occupation: Actress
- Years active: 2013–present
- Relatives: Vesela Kazakova (aunt)

Ralitsa Georgieva Stoyanova (Bulgarian: Ралица Георгиева Стоянова; born 23 May 1989) is a Bulgarian actress. She is best known for voicing the Bulgarian dub of the titular character in Mulan (2020) and for portraying Lora in Women Do Cry (2021).

== Life and career ==
Stoyanova was born on 23 May 1989 in Sofia. She is the daughter of Georgi Stoyanov, a puppeteer and voice actor, and Ekaterina Kazakova, an actress. In 2013, she graduated from the National Academy for Theatre and Film Arts with a degree in acting for puppet theatre.

Stoyanova is involved in the Bulgarian dubbing of films, series and commercials. Her most popular dubbing role was that of Mulan in Disney's 2020 film of the same name. She made her film debut as Lora in Women Do Cry (2021), starring opposite Maria Bakalova. This film was selected to compete in the Un Certain Regard section at the Cannes Film Festival, and was also screened at South by Southwest and the Glasgow Film Festival.

== Filmography ==
=== Live-action ===
List of acting performances in film
Year	Title	Role	Notes
2021	Women Do Cry	Lora	

=== Voice acting ===
==== Films ====
List of dubbing performances in films
Year	Title	Role	Notes
2013	Despicable Me 2	Other voices	
2014	Big Hero 6	GoGo Tomago	
2015	Aloha	Tracy Woodside	
2015	Blinky Bill the Movie	Nutsy	
2017	My Little Pony: The Movie	Underwater pony	
2018	Peter Rabbit	Additional voices	
2018	The Nutcracker and the Four Realms	Louise Stahlbaum	
2019	Maleficent: Mistress of Evil	Gerda	
2020	Mulan	Mulan	
2021	Earwig and the Witch	Earwig	
