= Lorenzo Senatore =

Italian cinematographer (born 1974)

- Born: 2 March 1974 (age 52); London, England
- Years active: 1993–present
- Organizations: International Cinematographers Guild; Associazione Italiana Autori della Fotografia Cinematografica
- Website: lorenzosenatore.com

Lorenzo Senatore, ICG, AIC (born 2 March 1974 in London, England) is an Italian cinematographer.

== Education and career ==
He studied filmmaking in Rome, and at the age of 25 became the youngest steadicam and camera operator in Italy.

Senatore has served as a camera operator and 2nd unit director of photography on numerous blockbuster films including 300: Rise of an Empire, Spectre, London Has Fallen, Beauty and the Beast, and Wonder Woman.

He has also served as director of photography on a number of Syfy television films.

== Filmography ==
=== Film ===
Short film

| Year | Title | Director |
|---|---|---|
| 2002 | Week-End | Paola Columba |

Feature film

| Year | Title | Director |
|---|---|---|
| 2004 | Post Impact | Christoph Schrewe |
| 2008 | Boogeyman 3 | Gary Jones |
| 2008 | Echelon Conspiracy | Greg Marcks |
| 2009 | The Fourth Kind | Olatunde Osunsanmi |
| 2009 | Double Identity | Dennis Dimster |
| 2011 | True Bloodthirst | Todor Chapkanov |
| 2013 | Spiders 3D | Tibor Takács |
| 2014 | Northmen: A Viking Saga | Claudio Fäh |
| 2014 | Tom Sawyer & Huckleberry Finn | Jo Kastner |
| 2015 | Ruby Strangelove Young Witch | Evgeny Ruman |
| 2016 | Risen | Kevin Reynolds |
| 2017 | Megan Leavey | Gabriela Cowperthwaite |
| 2019 | Hellboy | Neil Marshall |
| 2019 | The Outpost | Rod Lurie |
| 2020 | Ghosts of War | Eric Bress |
| 2022 | The Princess | Le-Van Kiet |
| 2023 | The Offering | Oliver Park |
| 2025 | Red Sonja | M. J. Bassett |
| 2026 | Lucky Strike | Rod Lurie |
| 2026 | Runner | Scott Waugh |

Direct-to-video

| Year | Title | Director | Notes |
|---|---|---|---|
| 2004 | Boa vs. Python | David Flores | |
| 2006 | Behind Enemy Lines II: Axis of Evil | James Dodson | |
| 2007 | Return to House on Haunted Hill | Víctor Garcia | |
| 2008 | Starship Troopers 3: Marauder | Edward Neumeier | With John Murlowski |
| 2009 | Messengers 2: The Scarecrow | Martin Barnewitz | |
| 2009 | Wrong Turn 3: Left for Dead | Declan O'Brien | |
| 2010 | Mirrors 2 | Víctor García | |
| 2011 | Sniper: Reloaded | Claudio Fäh | |
| 2014 | Asylum | Todor Chapkanov | |

=== Television ===
TV movies

| Year | Title | Director |
|---|---|---|
| 2003 | Silent Warnings | Christian McIntire |
| 2003 | Epoch: Evolution | Ian Watson |
| 2004 | Dragon Storm | Stephen Furst |
| 2004 | Phantom Force | Christian McIntire |
| 2004 | Darklight | Bill Platt |
| 2005 | Alien Siege | Robert Stadd |
| 2005 | Crimson Force | David Flores |
| 2005 | Path of Destruction | Stephen Furst |
| 2005 | Locusts: The 8th Plague | Ian Gilmour |
| 2005 | Manticore | Tripp Reed |
| 2006 | Magma: Volcanic Disaster | Ian Gilmour |
| 2006 | S.S. Doomtrooper | David Flores |
| 2007 | Grendel | Nick Lyon |
| 2007 | Reign of the Gargoyles | Ayton Davis |
| 2007 | Lake Placid 2 | David Flores |
| 2008 | Copperhead | Todor Chapkanov |
| 2010 | Monsterwolf | Todor Chapkanov |
| 2010 | Triassic Attack | Colin Ferguson |
| 2010 | Red Faction: Origins | Michael Nankin |
| 2011 | Swamp Shark | Griff Furst |
| 2011 | Miami Magma | Todor Chapkanov |
| 2012 | Arachnoquake | Griff Furst |
| 2013 | Deadly Descent: The Abominable Snowman | Marko Mäkilaakso |
| 2013 | Invasion Roswell | David Flores |

TV series

| Year | Title | Director | Notes |
|---|---|---|---|
| 2012 | Stolichani v poveche | Todor Chapkanov | 3 episodes |
| 2013 | Darvoto na jivota | Martin Makariev | 1 episode |
