= Vesela Kazakova =

Bulgarian filmmaker (born 1977)

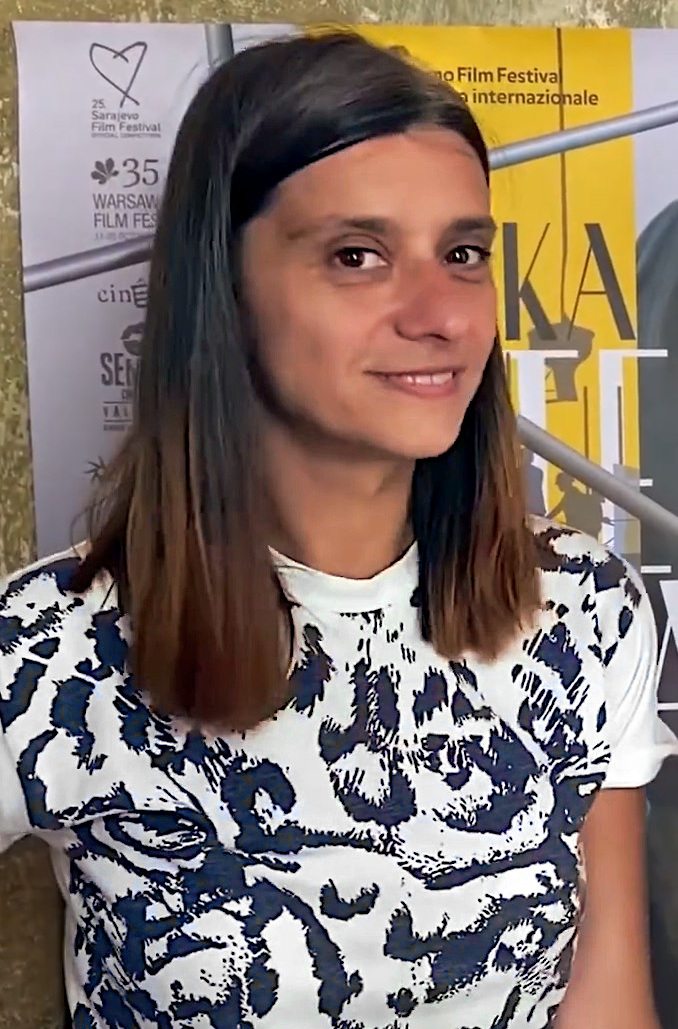
- Kazakova in 2020
- Born: Vesela Yordanova Kazakova; 4 July 1977 (age 49); Sofia, Bulgaria
- Education: National Academy for Theatre and Film Arts (BA); University of National and World Economy (MFA)
- Occupations: Actress; screenwriter; director; producer
- Years active: 1999–present

Vesela Yordanova Kazakova (Bulgarian: Весела Йорданова Казакова; born 4 July 1977) is a Bulgarian actress, screenwriter, director and producer. She is best known for her roles in Mila from Mars (2004) and Stolen Eyes (2005), as well as for her cinematography on films such as Cat in the Wall (2019) and Women Do Cry (2021) alongside directing partner Mina Mileva.

== Life and career ==
Kazakova was born on 4 July 1976 in Sofia. She first appeared on stage at the age of four with her twin sister Bilyana. Both were part of the Kambana children's theatre troupe, founded by their mother Snezhina Kazakova, who was also an actress. She majored in theater at the National Academy for Theatre and Film Arts in the class of Stefan Danailov. While still a student, she made her professional debut in the plays Antigone, produced by Margarita Mladenova, and in The Night Of Rock'n'Roll, directed by Ivaylo Hristov at Theatre 199. In 2000, she played the role of Nina in The Seagull by Anton Chekhov.

In this period, she gained an interest in producing independent theatre plays. For her performances in Stereolove and Nightsongs, she acted as project manager, co-writer, composer and actress. In 2003, she graduated from the University of National and World Economy in Sofia.

In 2001, she played her first major film role in List otbrulen (A Leaf in the Wind), directed by Svetoslav Ovcharov. For her role as a silent young girl, she won the Nevena Kokanova prize for best young actress at the Bulgarian Golden Rose Feature Film Festival in Varna in 2002.

Kazakova has won more than ten awards at Bulgarian and international festivals. In 2019, she directed Cat in the Wall alongside Mina Mileva. The film was presented in the official competition of the Locarno Film Festival and at South by Southwest in the United States. It received the FIPRESCI prize from the Warsaw Film Festival.

In 2021, she paired up with Mileva again to direct Women Do Cry. This film was selected to compete in the Un Certain Regard section at the Cannes Film Festival, and was also screened at South by Southwest and the Glasgow Film Festival. It was the winner of the Eurimages Audentia Award at the Trieste Film Festival in 2022.

== Selected filmography ==
Year	Title	Credited as		Role	Notes
Year	Title	Actor	director	Role	Notes
1999	Hourglass	Yes	No	Enthusiastic worshiper	
2002	List otbrulen	Yes	No	Vesa	
2002	Chervenata shapchitsa	Yes	No	Red Riding Hood	
2004	Toshka and Toshko	Yes	No	Toshka	
2004	Mila from Mars	Yes	No	Mila	
2004	Shantav den	Yes	No	Ina	
2005	Stolen Eyes	Yes	No	Ayten	
2008	I Don't Feel Like Dancing	Yes	No	Mädchen	
2009	Prima Primavera	Yes	No	Jolie	
2010	The Pillow	Yes	No	She	Short film
2010	Ao: The Last Hunter	Yes	No	Unak	
2010	Lin	Yes	No	Vesela	Short film
2012	Because of Mum	Yes	No	The Girl (voice)	
2013	The Enemy Within	Yes	No	Romanian woman	
2014	Uncle Tony, Three Fools and the Secret Service	No	Yes	—N/a	
2019	Cat in the Wall	No	Yes	—N/a	
2021	Women Do Cry	Yes	Yes	Yoana	
