= Michael Cory Davis =

American actor, filmmaker, and activist

Michael Cory Davis is an American actor, filmmaker, and activist.

== Early life and education ==
Born in Brooklyn to Jamaican parents, Davis studied acting at Fiorello H. LaGuardia High School. Upon graduation, he landed a recurring role on All My Children.

== Career ==
He has starred in shows such as Criminal Minds: Beyond Borders, Animal Kingdom, NCIS: LA, The Mentalist, For Better or Worse, and Anger Management with Charlie Sheen. He has also starred in six highly rated made for TV films for the SyFy Channel (Manticore, Raptor Island, Path of Destruction, Alien Siege, Alien Apocalypse, Cerberus) as well as Tyler Perry's For Colored Girls, opposite Thandiwe Newton.

== Filmography ==
=== Film ===
Year	Title	Role	Notes
2001	The Vault	Kyle	Direct-to-video
2003	3 Tables	Phillip	
2010	For Colored Girls	Man #1	
2016	5150	Jacob	
2017	Saturn Returns	James	
2017	Kings	Police Officer #9	

=== Television ===
Year	Title	Role	Notes
2000–2004	The Bold and the Beautiful	Josh / Husband #3	10 episodes
2004	Raptor Island	Marcus	Television film
2005	Alien Siege	Alex	Television film
2005	Alien Apocalypse	Chuck	Television film
2005	Path of Destruction	Eric	Television film
2005	Manticore	Pvt. Davis	Television film
2005	Cerberus	Burke	Television film
2010	Community	Sexy Dreadlocks	Episode: "Contemporary American Poultry"
2010	Law & Order: LA	Surfer	Episode: "Harbor City"
2011	CSI: NY	Bouncer	Episode: "Holding Cell"
2012	The One Percent	James	3 episodes
2012	Private Practice	Intake Nurse	Episode: "The Letting Go"
2012	Up All Night	Guy	Episode: "Jerry Duty"
2013, 2014	For Better or Worse	George	2 episodes
2014	Anger Management	Ballplayer	Episode: "Charlie & the Return of the Danger Girl"
2014	The McCarthys	Referee	Episode: "Arthur and Marjorie's Night Apart"
2015	The Mentalist	Benjamin Bennett	Episode: "Little Yellow House"
2015	Baby Daddy	Agent Lawrence	Episode: "The Mother of All Dates"
2016	Recovery Road	Policeman #2	Episode: "(Be)Coming Clean"
2016	Animal Kingdom	Guard	Episode: "Judas Kiss"
2016	Agents of S.H.I.E.L.D.	Agitator	Episode: "Uprising"
2016	NCIS: Los Angeles	Orderly	Episode: "Crazy Train"
2017	Criminal Minds: Beyond Borders	Jonario Shaw	Episode: "Obey"
2019	Lodge 49	Tuck	Episode: "Conjunctio"
2021	The Upshaws	Dr. Keon Bevans	Episode: "Gloves Off"
2021	Good Girls	Nate	Episode: "Chef Boyardee"
