= Theeran Adhigaaram Ondru (soundtrack) =

Soundtrack album by Ghibran
- Released: 2 November 2017
- Recorded: 2016–2017
- Genre: Feature film soundtrack
- Length: 25:31
- Language: Tamil
- Label: Aditya Music
- Producer: Ghibran

Ghibran chronology
Aramm (2017)	Theeran Adhigaaram Ondru (2017)	Maayavan (2017)

Theeran Adhigaaram Ondru is the soundtrack album composed by Ghibran, for the 2017 Tamil-language action thriller film of the same name directed by H. Vinoth and produced by S. R. Prakashbabu and S. R. Prabhu under the banner Dream Warrior Pictures, starring Karthi. The film is based on incidents from the Operation Bawaria case. The soundtrack consisted of seven songs, with lyrics written by Thamarai, Umadevi, Vivek, Raju Murugan, Ranjith, Udayakumar, Soundararajan and Ghibran himself penning for the album.

Most of the tracks (primary melody numbers) in the film were used as montages, and appear partially in the film, with exception for the sixth track in the album. The soundtrack consisted of varied genres had the aspects of a conventional Tamil film music. It was released at a soft launch on 2 November 2017. Both the albums were distributed and marketed by Aditya Music. The album was positively received, appreciating Ghibran for his work in the soundtrack and score.

== Development ==
The film marks Ghibran in his maiden collaboration with Karthi and H. Vinoth. The soundtrack to the film consisted of three melody songs, an item number, a sad song and an energetic track. Ghibran called Theeran Adhigaaram Ondru as his "first conventional Tamil film he is working after a long time" as his previous films were experimental and situational genres. Besides composing Ghibran had co-wrote lyrics for the track "Sevatha Pulla" with playback singer Ranjith, who also wrote the track. In his maiden attempt as a lyricist, Ghibran wrote few dummy lines, based on his college band experience and later re-wrote the same track with the lines have been alternatively changed.

Ghibran made an extensive research on the film's background score as he felt that it is important as similar to the songs in the film. He further called Theeran, along with Aramm, had a lot of aspects in common like director's clarity of thought, solid script, brilliant team and few others. The songs in the album, focused on the romantic angle in the film between Karthi and Rakul, appeared as sub-plot. It was partially used in the film as montages due to the limited screen time. The item number "Tinga Tinga", featuring Scarlett Mellish Wilson, appeared in full length in the film. It further has two versions: the original version by Namitha Babu, and the dual version sung by Padmalatha, featured lyrics in Hindi.

== Track list ==
No.	Title	Lyrics	Performer(s)	Length
1.	"Sevatha Pulla"	Ghibran, Ranjith	Ranjith	3:54
2.	"Oru Veetil"	Thamarai	Inno Genga, Shashaa Tirupati	4:03
3.	"O Sathiye"	Umadevi	Armaan Malik	3:56
4.	"Laali Laali"	Raju Murugan	Sathyaprakash, Pragathi Guruprasad	3:51
5.	"Theeran Da"	Vivek	Aravind Srinivas, Sarath Santhosh	3:16
6.	"Tinga Tinga" (Hindi)	Udayakumar	Padmalatha	3:16
7.	"Tinga Tinga" (Tamil)	Soundararajan	Namitha Babu	3:17
Total length:				25:31

== Release ==
The music rights of the film were purchased by Aditya Music. The audio launch of the film was scheduled to be held on a grand manner on 2 November 2017, but due to heavy rains prevailing in the Chennai, the makers had to abandon the plans and instead a soft launch was held at Sathyam Cinemas, Chennai with the cast and crew attending the event. The track "Sevatha Pulla" was launched exclusively through the music streaming platform Gaana, a day before the audio launch and received praise for the composition.

== Reception ==
V. Lakshmi, in her review for The Times of India, called the album as "purely commercial with elements of romance intact" and further said "Ghibran's formula (throw in an item song, a pacy number and a few melodies) works well in giving an album that predominantly has memorable tunes". Mridula Ramadugu of Firstpost further stated the soundtrack as "tailor-made" for the film and the cop story that is explored in it. Ramadugu stated "In Theeran Adhigaaram Ondru, Karthi plays the role of a cop for the second time after Siruthai (2011), so listeners expected this album to be a high octane one like the last. But what Ghibran gives us this time is a playlist filled with varied emotions and many subtle tracks rather than a music album of a typical entertainer."

Behindwoods gave the album 2.75 stars (out of 5) stating it as "A pleasant album that is easy on the ears, but lacks the extra punch". In the 3-star rating for the album, Indiaglitz called the album as "hypnotic". Ramesh Kannan of Moviecrow gave three-and-a-half out of five and said "Ghibran delivers an impressive soundtrack for a commercial entertainer, with melodies standing-out in the album". Karthik Srinivasan of Milliblog wrote "Ghibran's music is never uninteresting, but it can be good enough, like this soundtrack". A review from Sify stated "Ghibran's background score is a huge strength for the film, his songs have been only used as montages but his re-recording elevates the chasing sequence to a different level".

== Background score ==
The original soundtrack to Theeran Adhigaaram Ondru was released in two volumes: the first volume was released on 20 January 2018, and the second volume released on 10 February 2018.

Volume 1
No.	Title	Length
1.	"Ain't My End"	01:06
2.	"At the Speed of Light"	01:01
3.	"Bamba Ramba ft. Theeran"	01:08
4.	"Bamba Ramba"	00:28
5.	"Dance of the Angel and Devil"	01:27
6.	"Devil at the Doors"	02:35
7.	"Devils Dance in the Dark"	02:38
8.	"Dews in the Dark"	00:24
9.	"End ain't an Option"	01:09
10.	"Folk on my Foot"	01:06
11.	"Hear my Foot Steps"	00:58
12.	"Here I Come"	01:29
13.	"I See You"	02:18
14.	"Not Today"	00:23
15.	"N-S- E-W"	01:13
Total length:		19:23

Volume 2
No.	Title	Length
1.	"On My Watch"	00:52
2.	"See You In Hell"	00:54
3.	"Sharp My Swords"	00:28
4.	"Sun Shines Through Your Eyes"	00:53
5.	"The Bully Eyes"	00:23
6.	"The Devil High"	00:48
7.	"The Devils Lair"	02:26
8.	"The Devils Orchestra"	02:16
9.	"The Evolved"	01:05
10.	"The Pit Of Death"	01:44
11.	"The Tale Of The Thug"	02:01
12.	"They Call Me Devil"	02:33
13.	"Time Is At My Watch"	01:07
14.	"Touch My Toes"	05:31
15.	"Touch My Toes 2"	00:38
16.	"Trust My Instincts"	01:29
17.	"Watch For My Foot Steps"	00:37
Total length:		25:46
