= Petya of My Petya =

- Theatrical release poster
- Directed by: Alexander Kossev
- Written by: Valentina Angelova; Nelly Dimitrova
- Produced by: Krastyo Lambev; Nikolay Urumov
- Starring: Alexandra Kostova; Alena Vergova; Yasen Atanasov; Martin Metodiev
- Cinematography: Ivan Vatsov
- Edited by: Victoria Radoslavova
- Music by: George Strezov
- Production companies: BOF Pictures; Concept Studio
- Distributed by: Concept Studio
- Release dates: March 20, 2021 (SIFF); January 21, 2022 (Bulgaria); January 28, 2023 (HBO Max)
- Running time: 90 minutes
- Country: Bulgaria
- Language: Bulgarian

Petya of My Petya (Bulgarian: Петя на моята Петя) is a 2021 Bulgarian drama film directed by Alexander Kossev (in his directorial debut) and written by Valentina Angelova and Nelly Dimitrova. It stars Alexandra Kostova, Alena Vergova, Yasen Atanasov and Martin Metodiev. It is inspired by the life and work of the poet Petya Dubarova. The film was named on the shortlist for Bulgarian's entry for the Academy Award for Best International Feature Film at the 95th Academy Awards, but was not selected. It was considered again when Mother was disqualified, however, it was not selected.

== Synopsis ==
Grieved by injustice at school, betrayed by her closest people, 17-year-old Petya dies by suicide. This happened to the talented poet Petya Dubarova in 1979. This also happened in 2019 to an ordinary girl, also named Petya. Different times, different girl, the System that does not tolerate the different remains the same.

== Cast ==
The actors participating in this film are:

- Albena Pavlova
- Vasil Banov
- Yasen Atanasov
- Martin Metodiev
- Yulian Vergov
- Aleksandra Kostova
- Alisa Atanasova as Petya Dubarova
- Alena Vergova

== Release ==
The film had its international premiere on March 20, 2021, at the Sofia International Film Festival. The film was commercially released on January 21, 2022, in Bulgarian theaters. The film was released on January 28, 2023, in some European territories on HBO Max.

== Awards ==
Year	Award	Category	Recipient	Result	Ref.
2021	Golden Rose Bulgarian Feature Film Festival	Best First Feature	Petya of My Petya	Won	
2021	Golden Rose Bulgarian Feature Film Festival	Best Actress	Aleksandra Kostova	Won	
2021	Golden Rose Bulgarian Feature Film Festival	Best Actress - Special Mention	Albena Pavlova	Won	
2021	Sofia International Film Festival	Grand Prix - International Competition	Petya of My Petya	Nominated	
2022	Francofilm Festival	Audience Award	Petya of My Petya	Won	
