= Alien Siege =

- Written by: Bill Lundy; Paul Salamoff
- Directed by: Robert Stadd
- Starring: Brad Johnson; Carl Weathers; Erin Ross
- Theme music composer: Chris Walden
- Country of origin: United States
- Original language: English

Production
- Producer: Jeffery Beach
- Cinematography: Lorenzo Senatore
- Editor: Ken Peters
- Running time: 90 minutes

Original release
- Network: Sci Fi Channel
- Release: February 26, 2005

Alien Siege is a 2005 Sci-Fi Channel Original Movie about an alien race that comes to Earth seeking a cure to a deadly virus, for which the antidote is human blood.

== Plot ==
An alien species called the Kulku demand that eight million human beings be handed over to them to produce a cure for the virus that is killing them. In return, the Kuklu promise not to wipe out the planet and take what they want. While other countries empty their prisons to try to meet their quotas, the U.S. holds a lottery. One of the 8 million humans selected is Dr. Stephen Chase's daughter, Heather. Dr. Chase tries to interfere with the Kulku's plan by joining the human resistance and killing as many of the Kulku as possible. The resistance has some success using a weapon he designs, but Heather is captured and taken to the Kulku mothership in orbit where they discover that just a little bit of her blood, rather than the entirety of it as with other human beings, is enough to cure one Kulku. Jal, the Kulku ambassador, prepares to send her to Kulku. He plans to destroy the Earth with the Kulku's "Raeg" weapon, which will allow her to travel to the Kulku homeworld alive. Meanwhile, after the Kulku start just harvesting humans, U.S. Army forces under Major General Skyler, formerly an enemy to the resistance despite being sympathetic, join forces with the resistance to stop the Kulku. Using an observatory's telescope as a modified version of Chase's weapon, the resistance prepares to use the weapon to destroy the Raeg and save the Earth, but a traitor reveals their plans to Kor, a Kulku sympathetic to humanity's plight, but unwilling to sacrifice his own race. Kor lands a strike team at the observatory to stop the resistance and Chase uses the opportunity to board Kor's ship and force him to fly him to the Kulku mothership to rescue Heather. There, they discover that Jal has slaughtered the other Kulku and plans to return to the Kulku homeworld a hero with Heather. Jal mortally wounds Kor and battles Chase after he frees Heather. Thanks to a distraction by Heather, Chase gains the upper hand and kills Jal, but they are confronted by a dying Kor who tries to detonate the Raeg in order to save his own species. At the observatory all but two of the Kulku and one of the resistance are killed. The weapon is finally ready to be fired, but the two remaining Kulku nearly kill Blair before General Skylar and his men show up and finish them off, allowing Blair to fire the weapon and destroy the Raeg at the last moment. Kor's wound finally catches up to him and he collapses and Heather finishes him off in revenge for what the Kulku did to the people of Earth. Chase manages to fly a Kulku shuttle back to the observatory where the two reunite with Blair and General Skylar. A newsbroadcast at the end reveals that nearly eight million people died as a result of the Kulku invasion and the world is now left to recover while the Kulku presumably die out of the virus on their homeworld.

== Cast ==
- Brad Johnson as Dr. Stephen Chase
- Carl Weathers as Major General Skyler
- Erin Ross as Heather Chase
- Lilas Lane as Blair
- Nathan Anderson as Commander Kor
- Michael Cory Davis as Alex (credited as Cory Michael Davis)
- Gregor Paslawsky as Jal
- Ray Baker as The President
- Vladimir Nikolov as Leon Royce
- Andrew Deutsch as Carl Hadley
- Atanas Srebrev as Tom (credited as Nasko Srebrev)
- Carl Ed as Holbrook
- Ivan Ivanov as Dr. Baker
- Velizar Binev as Foster
- Yulian Vergov as Holland
- Svezhen Mladenov as Corporal (credited as Svejen Mlabenov)
- Panayot Tzanev as Captain
- Boris Pankin as Scientist

== Reception ==
A DVD Verdict review says, "Alien Siege isn't horrible and plays with some interesting ideas but my interest wavered throughout. It's one of the better SciFi originals, but that's not saying much." A Geeks of Doom review says, "Shamelessly ripping off V: The Final Battle and Independence Day, and that is just for starters, Robert Stadd’s made-for-television movie is a thoroughly enjoyable slice of sci-fi pie that knows exactly the demographic it is aiming for (if you perked up a little with the V name-drop, congratulations, you are the target) and hits the bull’s eye pretty much dead center." A DVD Pub review says, "So there’s some good ideas being volleyed around in ALIEN SIEGE, but after a while the movie just does the typical save-my-daughter-and-save-the-world thing."
