= Shakespeare Like a Street Dog =

Shakespeare Like A Street Dog
- Film poster
- Directed by: Valeri Yordanov
- Written by: Valeri Yordanov
- Produced by: George Abrashev; Borislav Chouchkov; Viktor Chouchkov; Kristina Despotova; Gergana Stankova
- Starring: Vladislav Stoimenov; Zahari Baharov; Vasil Iliev; Eleonora Ivanova
- Cinematography: Boris Slavkov
- Music by: Kalin Nikolov
- Production company: Chouchkov Brothers
- Release dates: September 26, 2022 (Golden Rose); February 3, 2023 (Bulgaria)
- Running time: 93 minutes
- Country: Bulgaria
- Language: Bulgarian

Shakespeare Like A Street Dog (Bulgarian: Шекспир като улично куче) is a 2022 Bulgarian drama film written and directed by Valeri Yordanov. Starring Vladislav Stoimenov, Zahari Baharov, Vasil Iliev and Eleonora Ivanova. The film was named on the shortlist for Bulgarian's entry for the Academy Award for Best International Feature Film at the 95th Academy Awards, but it was not selected. It was considered again when Mother was disqualified, however, it was not selected.

== Synopsis ==
A teenager gifted in both acting and street fighting must choose between two paths to save the life of a loved one: fighting in illegal boxing matches for cash or winning a reality television show centered on reciting Shakespeare.

== Cast ==
- Vladislav Stoimenov
- Zahari Baharov
- Vasil Iliev
- Doroteya Toleva
- Nikolay Nikolaev
- Nazam Karakurt
- Eleonora Ivanova
- Yavor Gadzhev

== Release ==
The film had its international premiere on September 26, 2022, at the Golden Rose Film Festival. It was commercially released on February 3, 2023, in Bulgarian cinemas.

== Awards ==
Year	Award	Category	Recipient	Result	Ref.
2022	Golden Rose Film Festival	Best Director	Valery Yordanov	Won	
2022	Golden Rose Film Festival	Best Screenplay	Valery Yordanov	Won	
2022	Golden Rose Film Festival	Best Actor	Vladislav Stoimenov	Won	
2022	Golden Rose Film Festival	Best Actor	Vasil Iliev	Won	
2022	Golden Rose Film Festival	Young Jury Award	Shakespeare Like A Street Dog	Won	
2022	Golden Rose Film Festival	Varna City Award	Shakespeare Like A Street Dog	Won	
2022	Golden Rose Film Festival	Bulgarian Union of Filmmakers Award	Shakespeare Like A Street Dog	Won	
