= Raptor Island =

- DVD cover
- Written by: Stanley Isaacs; Dean Widenmann
- Directed by: Stanley Isaacs
- Starring: Lorenzo Lamas; Steven Bauer; Hayley DuMond
- Music by: Peter Bernstein
- Country of origin: United States
- Original language: English

Production
- Cinematography: David Worth
- Editor: Christopher Roth
- Running time: 89 min.

Original release
- Network: Sci Fi Channel
- Release: August 21, 2004

Related
- Planet Raptor

Raptor Island is a 2004 American science fiction action film directed and co-written by Stanley Isaacs. Produced for television, the film premiered on the Sci Fi Channel on August 21, 2004.

== Plot ==
A team of SEALs chases a group of terrorists onto the island after destroying a weapons cache and rescuing a hostage special agent. While tracking the terrorists, mutated dinosaurs appear and the mission changes into simple survival. The dinosaurs use their skilled sense of smell and ability to swim to hunt down the SEALs and terrorists.

After losing several men to the raptors and killing some of the terrorists, the SEALs manage to rescue the female agent, Jamie, captured by the terrorists. She and the remaining SEALs discover a crash site of a Chinese airplane. Around the site are broken containers that had contained nuclear waste. The team figures the spilled waste caused the local animals to mutate into dinosaurs. The dinosaurs kill all the terrorists and SEALs except Azir, Jamie and the SEAL's leader. After encountering more mutant raptors, the last three SEALs and Jamie find refuge in a cave, which turns out to be the nest of the dinosaurs. In the end, Azir is killed by a mutated Carnotaurus and the island is destroyed as a result of volcanic activity. The last scene is of three raptors escaping the carnage, swimming after the rescue helicopter.

== Cast ==
- Lorenzo Lamas as Hacket
- Steven Bauer as Azir
- Hayley DuMond as Jamie Cole
- Michael Cory Davis as Marcus
- Peter Jason as Captain
- Hristo Shopov as Quinn
- Atanas Srebrev as Simon
- Ivo Tonchev as Rico
- Michail Elenov as Kalif
- Yulian Vergov as Rashid
- Pavil Gavrilov as Yusef
- Velislav Pavlov as Hassan
- Dejan Angelov as Diaz

== Home media ==
Raptor Island was released on DVD on November 14, 2006 by Anchor Bay Entertainment.

== See also ==
- List of films featuring dinosaurs
