= Julian Vergov =

Bulgarian actor (born 1970)

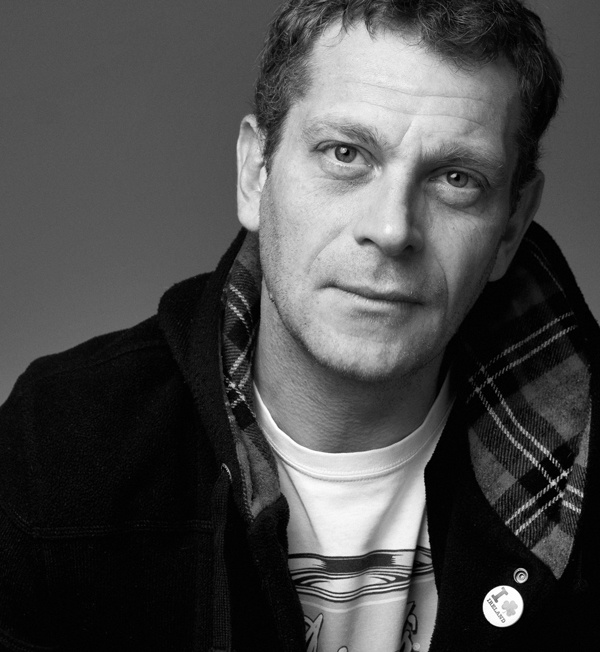
- Vergov in 2016
- Born: Julian Emilianov Vergov; 15 July 1970 (age 55); Sofia, Bulgaria
- Occupation: Actor
- Years active: 2000–present
- Children: 1

Julian Emilianov Vergov (Note: His name is also sometimes transliterated as Yulian Emilianov Vergov or Yuliyan Emilijanov Vergov.) (Bulgarian: Юлиан Емилиянов Вергов; born 15 July 1970) is a Bulgarian actor. He is best known for starring in the drama series Glass Home (2010–2012), and the medical drama Stolen Life (2017–2019).

Vergov made his acting debut in theatre, starring in Lilia Abadjieva's Romeo and Juliet at the Ivan Vazov National Theatre. He later began acting in films and has starred in numerous Bulgarian films, such as Seamstresses (2007), Mission London (2010), Directions (2017) and In the Heart of the Machine (2022), as well as appeared in several Hollywood productions, such as In Hell (2003), Until Death (2007), The Fourth Kind (2014), and Boyka: Undisputed (2017).

== Education ==
Prior to acting, Vergov took four years of engineering studies. In 2001, he graduated from the Lyuben Groys Theatre College in Sofia, where he studied acting in the class of Professor Tzvetana Maneva.

== Career ==
Vergov made his debut on the stage of the Ivan Vazov National Theatre in William Shakespeare's Romeo and Juliet, staged by Lilia Abadjieva. His other theatre performances include The Seagull and Hamlet at the Tear and Laughter Drama Theatre, The Marriage of Figaro at the Small City Theatre Behind the Canal, Platonov at the National Palace of Culture, The Verdict and Crime and Punishment at the Sfumato Theatre and The Goat, or Who Is Sylvia? at the Ivan Vazov National Theatre.

Apart from theatre, Vergov has starred in various television productions, such as the bTV sitcom She and He (2002–2008). In 2010, he starred in the drama series Glass House where he portrayed Nikolai. In 2012, he appeared as Mr. Savov in Revolution Z: Sex, Lies and Music, and between 2017 and 2019, he starred in Nova's medical drama series Stolen Life. In 2019 and 2020, he was a guest panelist on The Masked Singer. In 2020 and 2021, he was a judge on the Bulgarian adaptation of Your Face Sounds Familiar.

== Personal life ==
Vergov is in a long-term relationship with his partner Irina Yalamova. They have a daughter named Alena.

== Awards ==
In 2015, Vergov won an Icarus award for Best Supporting Actor for the role of Boris Sarafov in the Ivan Vazov National Theatre play The Thessaloniki Conspirators. In 2021, he won the Best Actor award at the Riviera International Film Festival for his role in the Bulgarian drama film German Lessons (2020).

== Selected filmography ==
=== Film ===
Year	Title	Role	Notes
2001	Mindstorm	Preznev	
2002	The Good War	Frank	
2003	Antibody	Moran	Direct-to-video
2003	In Hell	Solitary Guard	
2003	Shark Zone	Billy	Direct-to-video
2003	Journey to Jerusalem	Goran	
2005	Raging Sharks	Roosevelt First Officer	Direct-to-video
2005	The Turkish Gambit	Bulgarian Officer	
2005	Submerged	Rollins	Direct-to-video
2007	The Lark Farm	Giovane Turco	
2007	Until Death	Agent 1	Direct-to-video
2007	Seamstresses	Misho	
2009	Command Performance	Command Aide	Direct-to-video
2009	The Tournament	Syndicate Guy	
2009	The Fourth Kind	Will Tyler	
2009	Double Identity	Victor Krastev	
2010	Mission London	Varadin Dimitrov	
2016	Boyka: Undisputed	Slava	Direct-to-video
2017	Directions	Rumen	
2022	In the Heart of the Machine	Captain Vekilsky	
2024	Triumph	Colonel Platnikov	

=== Television ===
Year	Title	Role	Notes
2002	Interceptor Force 2	Rebel Leader	Television film
2002	She and He	Martin	Main role; 103 episodes
2004	Spartacus	Scout	2 episodes
2004	Raptor Island	Rashid	Television film
2004	Darklight	Clerk	Television film
2005	Mansquito	SWAT Member	Television film
2005	Alien Siege	Holland	Television film
2005	A Love to Hide	Johann Von Berg	Television film
2005	Path of Destruction	Lab Worker #2	Television film
2005	Locusts: The 8th Plague	ER Doctor	Television film
2006	Magma: Volcanic Disaster	Radio Operator	Television film
2006	S.S. Doomtrooper	Nazi Guard #1	Television film
2006	Dragon Dynasty	Italian Soldier	Television film
2007	Reign of the Gargoyles	Colonel Schrieber	Television film
2010–2012	Glass Home	Nikolay Zhekov	Main role; 64 episodes
2012–2014	Revolution Z	Nikola Savov	Main role; 50 episodes
2017–2019	Stolen Life	Victor Bankov	Main role; 69 episodes
2019–2020	The Masked Singer	Guest panelist	Season 1–2
2020–2021	Your Face Sounds Familiar	Judge	Season 8–9
2021	The Hunt for Salamander	Kamen Petkov	Main role; 13 episodes
