= Stolen Eyes =

2005 film

- Directed by: Radoslav Spasov
- Starring: Vesela Kazakova; Valeri Yordanov
- Release date: November 2005
- Running time: 102 minutes
- Country: Bulgaria
- Languages: Bulgarian; Turkish

Stolen Eyes (Bulgarian: Откраднати очи, translit. Otkradnati ochi) is a 2005 Bulgarian drama film. It depicts the story fraught romantic relationship between a Christian man and a Muslim Turkish woman in the 1980s amidst the Revival Process.

== Plot ==
Ivan works as a clerk in the local administration where he controls stamps needed to issue new identity documents during the Revival Process. Ayten is a primary school teacher who tries to steal stamps in order to avoid forced name changes. This incident leads to an immediate sense of connection between the two. Ivan is then faced with the choice of whether or not to "rename" Ayten in the face of official consequences. Later, Bulgarian communist special forces kill Ayten's child. Ivan is shocked by this and hospitalized alongside Ayten. The two then gradually overcome bitterness and accept their differences. The movie then explores the varying degrees of acceptance of their relationship from both ethnic Bulgarians and members of the Turkish minority.

== History ==
The movie was Bulgaria's submission to the 78th Academy Awards for the Academy Award for Best Foreign Language Film and it was entered into the 27th Moscow International Film Festival where Vesela Kazakova won the award for Best Actress.

The film's director, Radoslav Spasov, had earlier worked as a cameraman on the Revival Process-era anti-Turkish film Time of Violence.

== Cast ==
- Vesela Kazakova as Ayten
- Valeri Yordanov as Ivan
- Nejat Isler as Bratat / Brother
- Itzhak Finzi as Dyadoto / Grandfather
- Iliana Kitanova as Lekarkata / Lady doctor
- Stoyan Aleksiev as Ofitzer ot DS / KGB police officer
- Maria Kavardjikova as Valya "kosmonavtkata" / Valya "space woman"
- Maria Statulova as Selyanka / Peasant woman

== See also ==
- List of submissions to the 78th Academy Awards for Best Foreign Language Film
- List of Bulgarian submissions for the Academy Award for Best Foreign Language Film
