= Women Do Cry =

2021 film

- Theatrical release poster
- Directed by: Vesela Kazakova; Mina Mileva
- Screenplay by: Vesela Kazakova; Mina Mileva
- Story by: Bilyana Kazakova
- Produced by: Vesela Kazakova; Mina Mileva; Christophe Bruncher; Olivier Père
- Starring: Maria Bakalova; Vesela Kazakova; Bilyana Kazakova; Iossif Surchadzhiev; Ralitsa Stoyanova
- Cinematography: Lionel Kopp; Dimitar Kostov
- Edited by: Donka Ivanova; Yann Dedet
- Music by: Andy Cowton
- Production companies: Activist38; Arte; Ici et Là Productions
- Release dates: 14 July 2021 (Cannes); 17 September 2021 (Bulgaria)
- Running time: 107 minutes
- Countries: Bulgaria; France
- Language: Bulgarian

Women Do Cry (Bulgarian: Жените наистина плачат) is a 2021 Bulgarian drama film written and directed by Vesela Kazakova and Mina Mileva, and starring Maria Bakalova, Vesela Kazakova, Bilyana Kazakova, Iossif Surchadzhiev and Ralitsa Stoyanova. Set in Sofia, the film depicts 19-year-old Sonja, who is diagnosed with HIV, and the women in her family who flock around and support her.

The film premiered at the 2021 Cannes Film Festival, where it competed in the Un Certain Regard section, and was also screened at the Glasgow Film Festival and South by Southwest. It was released in theatres in Bulgaria and France to positive critical reception.

== Plot ==
A promising 19-year-old musician named Sonja learns that she’s contracted HIV. After she drops out of the music conservatory, Sonja is helped out by her practical sister Lora, who supports the family by working as a crane driver, and their hapless mom Anna. Sonja’s crisis brings together two generations of women: sisters and aunts who have experienced relentless misogyny, shaming, and homophobia in turn. The women also share the trauma of violence in their own family, which slowly resurfaces the more time they spend together, learning to speak out and to grieve.

== Cast ==
- Maria Bakalova as Sonja
- Vesela Kazakova as Yoana
- Bilyana Kazakova as Veronica
- Iossif Surchadzhiev as The Father
- Ralitsa Stoyanova as Lora
- Dobriela Popova as Tina
- Katia Kazakova as Anna
- Rositza Gevrenova as Maria
- Siana Georgieva as Katerina
- Dragomir Kostadinov as Drago

== Release ==
The film had its world premiere at the Cannes Film Festival in the Un Certain Regard section on 14 July 2021. Domestically, it was first screened on 15 September 2021 at Sofia Film Fest, and went on to screen at the Cork Film Festival on 7 November 2021, Glasgow Film Festival on 9 March 2022, and SXSW on 12 March 2022. The film was released theatrically in Bulgaria on 17 September 2021, and in France on 9 March 2022.

== Reception ==
On the review aggregator website Rotten Tomatoes, the film has an approval rating of 73% based on 15 reviews, with an average rating of 5.8/10.

It was the winner of the Eurimages Audentia Award at the Trieste Film Festival in 2022.
