= Vladimir Zombori =

Bulgarian actor

- Владимир Зомбори
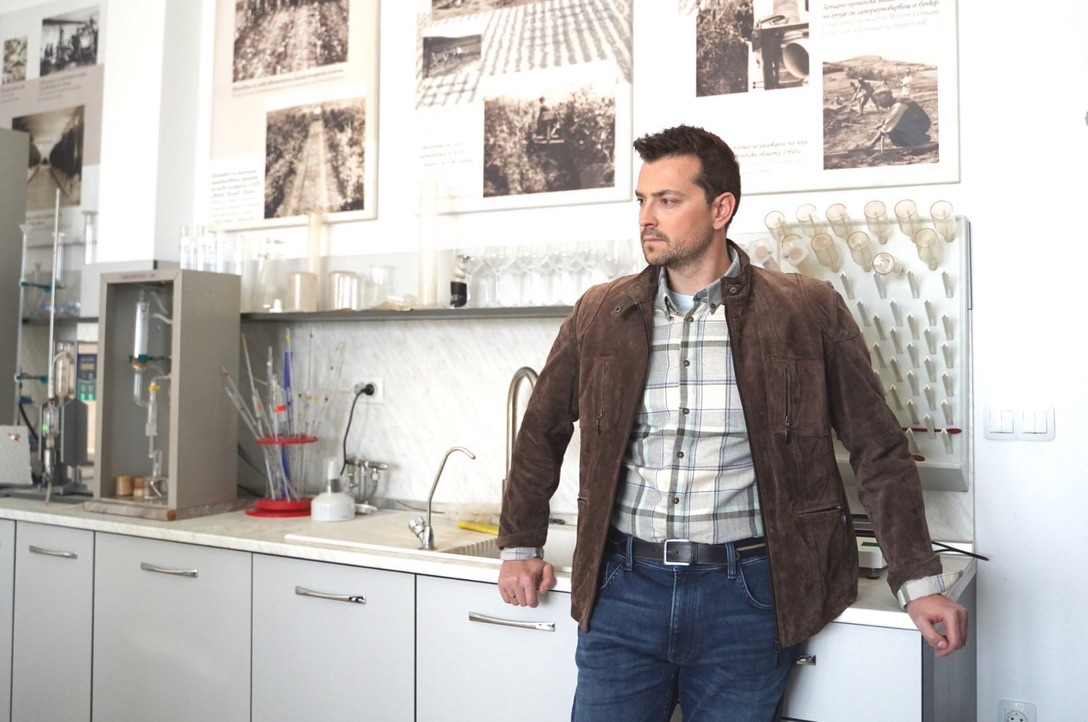
- Born: Vladimir Aleksandrov Zombori; 3 July 1988 (age 38); Plovdiv, Bulgaria
- Education: National Academy for Theatre and Film Arts (BA)
- Occupation: Actor
- Years active: 2011–present

Vladimir Aleksandrov Zombori (Bulgarian: Владимир Александров Зомбори; born July 3, 1988) is a Bulgarian actor.

== Life and career ==
Zombori was born on July 3, 1988, in Plovdiv. He studied production design in National High School of Stage and Film Design. In 2011, he graduated from the National Academy for Theatre and Film Arts with a degree in acting for drama theatre in Atanas Atanasov's class.

In September 2011, Zombori starred in the Bulgarian reality show X Factor.

Zombori owes his family name (from Hungarian Zsombory) to his great-grandfather who arrived in Bulgaria from Austria-Hungary to become court confectioner to Tsar Ferdinand I.

In February 2024, he participated in the twelfth season of Kato Dve Kapki Voda (Your Face Sounds Familiar). After three months, in May he was announced as the winner. The same year, he hosted the eleventh season of Glasat na Bulgaria with Boryana Bratoeva.

== Filmography ==
=== Feature films ===
List of acting performances in film
Year	Title	Role	Notes
2012	Migration of the Belted Bonito	Tisho	
2016	Voevoda	Stoilko	
2017	Bubblegum	Hristo	
2019	Seen	The Man	
2022	In the Heart of the Machine	Kovachki	
2023	Game of Trust	Kamen	

=== Television ===
List of acting performances in film
Year	Title	Role	Notes
2017	Follow Me	Metodi Ivanov	
2019	The Road of Honor	Ognyan	
2022	With River at Heart	Dimitar Draganov	
2023	Vine	Filip	

=== Voice acting ===
==== Films ====
List of dubbing performances in films
Year	Title	Role	Notes
2011	The Muppets	Walter	
2013	Epic	Nod	
2017	Smurfs: The Lost Village	Brainy Smurf	
2017	The Boss Baby	Adult Tim	
2018	Solo: A Star Wars Story	Han Solo	
2018	Spider-Man: Into the Spider-Verse	Miles Morales	
2019	How to Train Your Dragon: The Hidden World	Hiccup	
2019	Aladdin	Prince Anders	
2021	The Boss Baby: Family Business	Tim Templeton	
2022	The Bad Guys	Piranha	
