= Rashid Yassin =

Iraqi journalist and poet

Rasheed Yassin Al-Rabaie
- رشيد ياسين
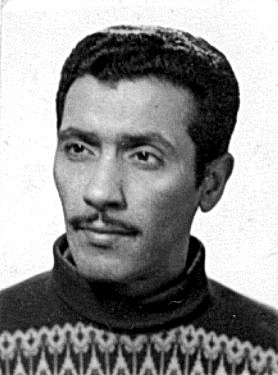
- Born: July 1, 1931; Baghdad, Mandatory Iraq
- Died: April 30, 2012 (aged 80); Central West End, St. Louis, Missouri, United States
- Education: Krastyo Sarafov National Academy for Theatre and Film Arts (B.A., 1969 and M.A., 1971); Sofia University (PhD in philosophy and aesthetics, ca 1990–1997)
- Occupations: Journalist, poet, literary critic, theatre critic, university professor, translator
- Employer(s): Radio Bulgaria (1963–1969) Sana'a University (1997–2004) University of Michigan-Dearborn (2005-ca. 2007)
- Board member of: Union of Iraqi Writers
- Website: Spoken Languages: Arabic, Bulgarian, English

Rashid Yassin Abbas Al-Rabaie (Arabic: رشيد ياسين) (July 1, 1931– April 30, 2012) was an Iraqi journalist, poet, literary critic, and university professor. He was born in Baghdad under Mandatory Iraq, where he completed his primary and secondary education. He then pursued a bachelor's degree in theatre science at Krastyo Sarafov National Academy for Theatre and Film Arts in Bulgaria, and later obtained a postgraduate degree in philosophy and aesthetics from Sofia University.

Al-Rabaie was engaged in national politics from the beginning of the 1950s, living in Syria as a political refugee from 1955 to 1958. He worked as a writer at the Arab Writers Union's Literary Attitude Magazine, the Baghari Popular Front newspaper, the Syrian Soldier, al-Naba 'al-Baghdadi daily newspaper, and The Editor. Later, he became an art adviser of cinema and theatre in Iraq and a consultant for the Arabic Horizon magazine.

Al-Rabaie began publishing his poems in the mid-1940s and was one of the first to renew the rhythm and structure of Arabic poetry. His poetry included Neglected Papers (1972), Death in the Desert (1986) and The Sad Doll.

He left Iraq for Yemen in 1997 to become a professor at Sana'a University. In 2004, he moved to the United States to become a professor of Arabic at the University of Michigan–Dearborn, until his retirement. In 2007, he moved to in Central West End of St. Louis, Missouri, where he died. He was buried in Park Lone Cemetery, Lemay, Missouri.

== Early life ==
Rashid Yassin Abbas Al-Rabaie was born in Baghdad; he was the eldest of six children. His exact date of birth is unknown: reported dates include 1 July 1931 and 7 January 1929.

His father was a Shia, a member of the Rabi'a clan and an entrepreneur who pursued many businesses, including importing household goods.

Al-Rabaie completed his primary and secondary school education in Baghdad. A distant relative of his was a government minister, and his family encouraged him to attend law school and get a government job. But, he knew from high school that he had a knack for poetry, and withdrew from law school in his second year. During this period, he began his political activity and joined demonstrations opposing the British occupation of Iraq.

In 1955, Al-Rabaie then went to Syria as a political refugee, where he worked in literary and political journalism. There, he met Mohammed Mahdi al-Jawahiri and his first wife. He returned home after Iraq's 14 July Revolution in 1958, which overthrew the Hashemite monarchy, but later left Iraq in 1961. Two years later, the Ba'ath Party seized control of the government with the Ramadan Revolution of February 1963.

He continued his education in Bulgaria, completing his higher studies at the Krastyo Sarafov National Academy for Theatre and Film Arts in Sofia in 1969, and was awarded the equivalent of a master's degree in 1971. While in Bulgaria, he was harassed by the Bulgarian Communist Party.

Next, he moved to Syria, where he and his first wife divorced, after which he moved again to Beirut, Lebanon. He left Lebanon in 1976 when the civil war erupted. From there, he returned to Iraq and remarried. He would later return to Bulgaria, after the fall of the communist regime, to finish his doctorate in philosophical sciences at Sofia University.

== Career ==
He began his media career at Baghdad's Popular Front newspaper in 1950 and became responsible for the literary page of al-Naba 'al-Baghdadi daily newspaper the following year. He worked in the Syrian Soldier magazine from 1956 until the revolution of July 14, 1958. After fleeing, he worked as a translator and broadcaster at Radio Bulgaria in Sofia from 1963 to1969. He was editor of the Literary Attitude Magazine of the Arab Writers' Union of Damascus from 1972 to 1973. He was a literary critic for the Lebanese newspaper The Editor from 1973 to 1976. Al-Rabaie served as Chairman of the Cultural Section of the Beirut Newspaper from 1974 until 1976 and served as Head of the Cultural Section of the University Newspaper of the Ministry of Higher Education in 1989.

At the Cultural and Artistic Department, Al-Rabaie served as chief of the Research and Theatre Documentation section of the State Foundation for Cinema and Theatre in Baghdad from 1976 to 1980, then as the foundation's dramatic consultation, until 1983. He became technical adviser to the Film and Theatre Foundation, serving the role until 1985. He was an adviser to the Public Foundation for Cultural Affairs from 1985 to 1988.

He then left Iraq for Yemen and was appointed Professor of Arab Literature at Sana'a university from 1997 to 2004. Then in the United States, he worked as a professor of Arabic at the University of Michigan–Dearborn from 2005 until he retired.

Al-Rabaie was a member of the Union of Iraqi Writers and an honorary member of the Union of Lebanese Literature; he attended a number of literary conferences held in the country, and had debates in the literary press on the theories surrounding art and theatre.

== Death ==
Rashid Yassin Abbas Al-Rabaie died on 30 April 2012 at his home in Central West End, St. Louis, Missouri, United States and was buried in Park Lone Cemetery in Lemay, Missouri. His son, Dr. Nabil Yassin of St. Louis, said that in 2009 he had been diagnosed with progressive supranuclear palsy.

== His work ==
Al-Rabaie translated literary works and studies from English and Bulgarian into Arabic. He also published his own poetry and writings in Iraqi and other Arab newspapers and magazines. In addition to translations, some of the fields he wrote about were theoretical studies and critical articles in literature, theatre, and aesthetics. Some of his works include:

- Discarded Papers, poetry collection, Arab Writers' Union of Damascus, 1972.
- Death in the desert, poetry collection, about the House of Cultural Affairs in Baghdad, 1986.
- From Ulysses Papers in the Journey of Loss, poetry collection, Lebanese Khayal House in Beirut, 2002.
- Invitation to Self-Awareness, Critical Studies and Articles in Theatre, Arab Writers' Union in Damascus, 2000.
- Knight of Death (criticism of Saddam Hussein), Poetry Group, Ayadi Center for Studies and Publishing in Sana'a, 2004.
- Fox that lost its tail, critical studies in poetry and poetry, Abadi Center for Studies and Publishing in Sana 'a, 2004.
