= News7 =

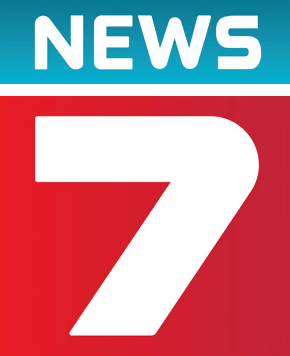
- Country: Bulgaria

Ownership
- Owner: Crown Media
- Sister channels: TV7, Sport7, Super7

History
- Launched: 1996 (as PDM); 2000 (as Demo TV); 3 March 2003 (as BBT); 7 March 2013 (as News7)
- Closed: 16 September 2016; 10 years ago
- Former names: PDM (1996-2000); Demo TV (2000-2003); BBT (2003-2013)

Links
- Website: http://www.news7.bg/

News7 was a Bulgarian television channel, owned by Crown Media along with its sister channels TV7, Sport7 and Super7. It aired news and sports events, such as the Bulgarian Football Championship, and lifestyle bulletins. It was also the main sponsor to the Bulgarian A Professional Football Group. The channel was part of the CNN International network, along with CNN Türk. It launched as the private cable television PDM in 1996 broadcasting in Sofia. It was rebranded to Demo TV in 2000 and to BBT in 2003, when it became a national cable and satellite network, later airing terrestrially in over 50 cities and towns in Bulgaria. The channel was bought by TV7 in 2012 and rebranded as News7 on 7 March 2013. News7 ceased broadcasting of original programming on 1 February 2016 due to bankruptcy. The channel was officially closed down on 16 September 2016, after its broadcasting license was taken down by the Bulgarian Council for Electronic Media.

BBT logo used 2005-2007

BBT logo used 2007-2009

BBT logo used 2009-2013
