= Manticore (2005 film) =

- DVD cover
- Written by: John Werner
- Directed by: Tripp Reed
- Starring: Robert Beltran; Heather Donahue; Chase Masterson; Jeff Fahey
- Theme music composer: David C. Williams
- Country of origin: United States
- Original languages: English, Arabic

Production
- Producers: Jeffery Beach; Phillip Roth
- Cinematography: Lorenzo Senatore
- Editors: David Flores; Tripp Reed
- Running time: 88 minutes

Original release
- Network: Sci-Fi Channel
- Release: November 26, 2005

Manticore is an American Sci-Fi original movie that aired on the Sci-Fi Channel on November 26, 2005. It was directed by Tripp Reed and featured Heather Donahue, Chase Masterson and Robert Beltran. It is about a squad of United States Army soldiers in Iraq that must fight against a resurrected, nearly unstoppable manticore awoken from its slumber by an Iraqi insurgent leader.

== Overview ==
United States Army soldiers with the 10th Mountain Division stationed in Iraq are sent on a search to look for missing journalists. They come to a small Iraqi town and find a man-eating monster instead. The soldiers find out that the residents of the town are dead and discover a living "Weapon of Mass Destruction", a Manticore. The Manticore was awakened from its long slumber by an Iraqi insurgent leader wanting to rid the country of foreign occupation forces at any price. The Manticore goes on a killing rampage and soon, the only ones left are Baxter, Keats, and Ashley Pierce. The Manticore kills Ashley by spitting acid on her face before eating her alive, but Baxter and Keats manage to kill it with a camcorder and a sledgehammer.

== Cast ==
- Robert Beltran as Sergeant Tony Baxter
- Heather Donahue as Corporal Keats
- Chase Masterson as Ashley Pierce
- Jeff Fahey as Major Spence Kramer
- Faran Tahir as Umari
- A. J. Buckley as Private Sulley
- Michael Cory Davis as Private Davis
- Benjamin Burdick as Ryan
- Richard Gnolfo as John Busey
- Edmund Druilhet as Sergeant Cohen
- Michail Elenov as Fathi
- George Zlatarev as Safa
- Jeff M. Lewis as Ortiz
- Tripp Reed as Sergeant Henderson
- Vlado Mihailov as Mickey
- Jonas Talkington as "Mouth"
- Atanas Srebrev as "Charms"
