= Sport7 =

Bulgarian television channel

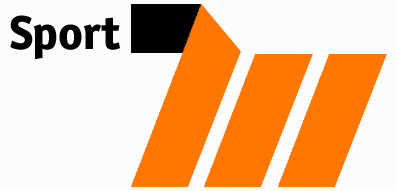
- Country: Bulgaria

Ownership
- Owner: TV7 Group
- Sister channels: TV7, News7, Super7

History
- Launched: 1 September 2008; 18 years ago
- Closed: 31 May 2009; 17 years ago

Links
- Website: http://www.sport7.bg/

Sport7 was a Bulgarian sports television channel, owned by TV7 Group along with its sister channels TV7, News7 and Super7. The channel was first launched in 2008 as a jointventure of TV7 and the cable TV broadcaster Cabletel. It aired sports events like La Liga, Serie A, Formula One, GP2 Series and others. It was closed down on 31 May 2009, as Cabletel withdrew from operating the channel.
