= Margarit and Margarita =

1989 film

- Film poster
- Directed by: Nikolai Volev
- Written by: Nikolai Volev
- Starring: Irini Antonios Zampona
- Release date: 4 December 1989
- Running time: 92 minutes
- Country: Bulgaria
- Language: Bulgarian

Margarit and Margarita (Bulgarian: Маргарит и Маргарита) is a 1989 Bulgarian drama film directed by Nikolai Volev. The film was selected as the Bulgarian entry for the Best Foreign Language Film at the 63rd Academy Awards, but was not accepted as a nominee.

== Plot ==
Margarit and Margarita, students in the last grade of high school, love each other. Proud and independent, they often confront their teachers and parents. They leave the school and their homes for the sake of being free. However they enter in a world full of corruption and brutality.

== Cast ==
- Irini Antonios Zampona as Margarita-Rita
- Hristo Shopov as Margarit
- Rashko Mladenov as Yuliyan the choreographer
- Vassil Mihajlov as Nerizanov
- Veselin Vulkov as Yanev, Margarit's father
- Iliya Raev as the school principal
- Tanya Shahova as Kostova, the head teacher

== See also ==
- List of submissions to the 63rd Academy Awards for Best Foreign Language Film
- List of Bulgarian submissions for the Academy Award for Best Foreign Language Film
