= Alien Apocalypse =

2005 American science fiction TV film

- Promotional poster
- Written by: Josh Becker
- Directed by: Josh Becker
- Starring: Bruce Campbell; Renee O'Connor; Remington Franklin; Michael Cory Davis; Peter Jason
- Theme music composer: Joseph LoDuca
- Country of origin: United States
- Original language: English

Production
- Producers: Jeff Franklin; Bob Perkis
- Cinematography: David Worth
- Editor: Shawn Paper
- Running time: 88 minutes
- Production company: Syfy

Original release
- Network: Sci Fi Channel
- Release: March 26, 2005

Alien Apocalypse is a 2005 Sci Fi channel original movie, directed and written by Josh Becker, and starring Bruce Campbell, Renee O'Connor, Remington Franklin, Michael Cory Davis and Peter Jason. It was released on DVD on March 26, 2005.

== Plot ==
Astronaut and osteopath, Dr. Ivan Hood and his companion Kelly return to Earth after a 40-year space mission with two other astronauts. They are soon captured by human bounty hunters near the ruins of Portland, Oregon and one of their team is killed after sustaining a sprain; Dr. Hood pointed out that it would have healed in a few days. They are taken to a work camp, which to their surprise, is run by giant termite-like aliens. These aliens had arrived 20 years ago to feast on the wood and used E.M.P. bombs to cripple earth before their invasion. The other member of their team is eaten alive by one of the aliens after refusing to work. The camp is supervised by human bounty hunters; they are treated better. After seeing how illiterate and savage humans have become due to the aliens, Dr. Hood and Kelly plan to make an escape the next day after hearing rumors that the President has survived and has an army waiting to strike back.

The escape plan goes off without a hitch, but Kelly is recaptured by the bounty hunters. Dr. Hood travels to find the president and meets other humans who believe the President has survived. Dr. Hood and his convoy reach a secret headquarters to discover remnants of the American government and the President, who is now a shell of his former self. Extremely ticked off, Dr. Hood decides to rally the escaped slaves himself and plans an attack on the bug camp where Kelly is still being held. The attack begins successfully and Kelly (who has lost one of her fingers as punishment for trying to escape) joins in. Things seem hopeless when the bugs bring in heavy artillery, but the President's group arrives and pulls off a sneak attack that blows up the bug's tanks. The other slaves join in and defeat the bugs. Dr. Hood and his rebels then go on a quest to continue killing the bugs and gather more followers from the camps. "In time he (Dr. Hood) became known as The Great Exterminator".

== Cast ==
- Bruce Campbell as Dr. Ivan Hood
- Renee O'Connor as Lieutenant Kelly Lanaman
- Remington Franklin as Alex
- Michael Cory Davis as Captain Chuck Burkes
- Peter Jason as President Demsky
- Vladimir Kolev as Bob "Fisherman Bob"
- Valentin Giasbeily as Tyler
- Velizar Binev as Manager
- Dimiter Kuzov as Bounty Hunter 1
- Krum Iapulov as Bounty Hunter 2
- Jonas Talkington as Bounty Hunter 3
- Zlatko Zlatkov as Bounty Hunter 4
- Chavdar Simeonov as Alien Leader
- Anton Trendafilov as Jeff
- Rosi Chernogova as Bizzy
- Todor Nikolov as Bill "Mountain Man Bill"
- Asen Blatechki as Crazy Man

== Production ==
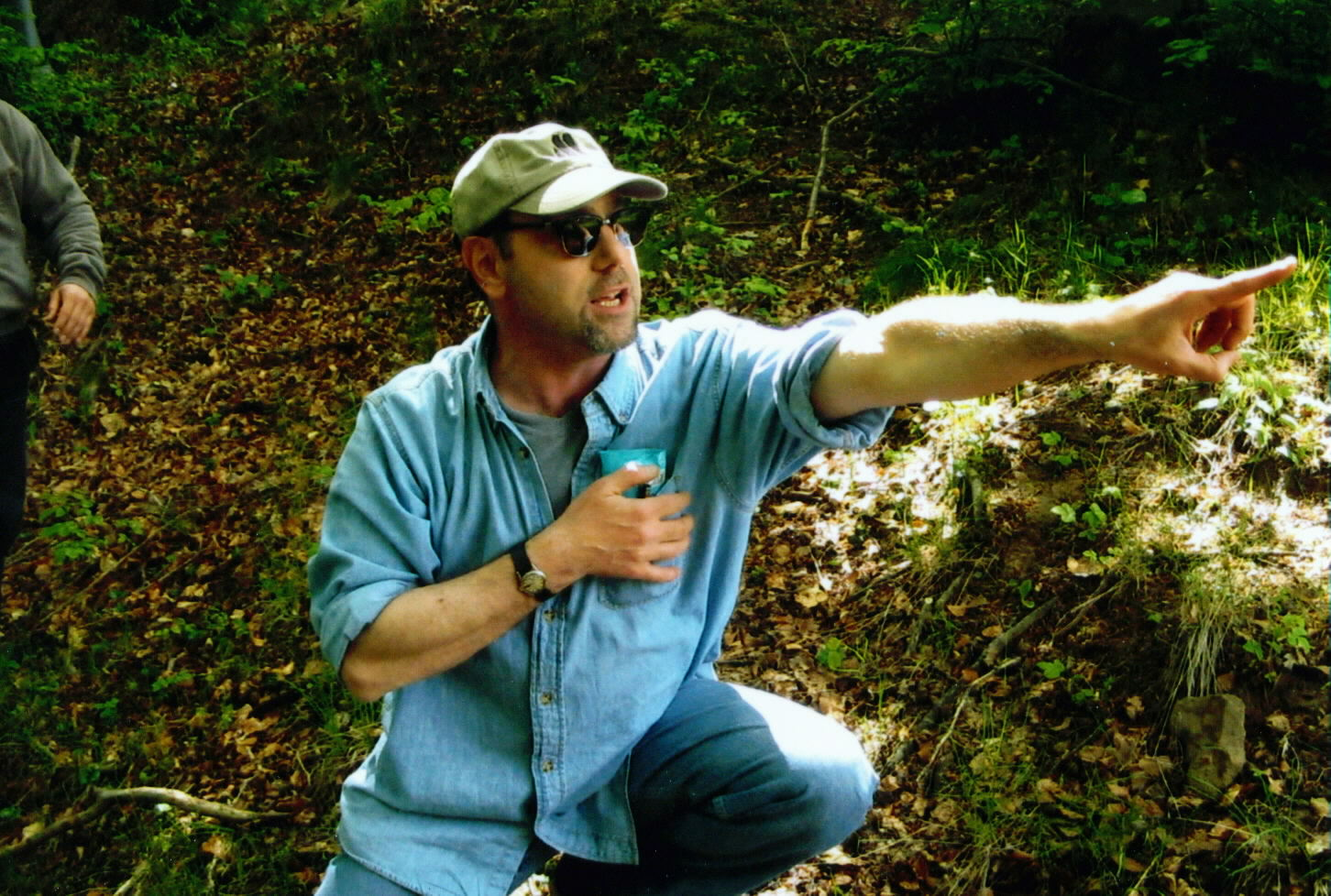
Josh Becker directing Alien Apocalypse.

This film was shot in Bulgaria (as with Man with the Screaming Brain, also starring Campbell). According to the DVD commentary many of the actors in the film were Bulgarian and spoke little English so most of the dialogue was dubbed or "looped" in post-production.

== Reception ==
Alien Apocalypse received mixed reviews from critics and audiences. David Nusair of Reel Film Reviews said "By the time the Spartacus-inspired finale rolls around, it's clear we're not meant to take any of this seriously."

== See also ==
- Planet of the Apes
- Battlefield Earth
- Android Apocalypse
