= Fishbone (2021 film) =

- Theatrical release poster
- Directed by: Dragomir Sholev
- Written by: Emanuela Dimitrova; Georgi Merdzhanov; Dragomir Sholev
- Produced by: Carla Fotea; Ada Solomon; Rossitsa Valkanova
- Starring: Deyan Donkov; Suzy Radichkova; Valentin Andreev
- Cinematography: Nenad Boroevich
- Edited by: Catalin Cristutiu
- Production companies: HiFilm; Klas Film
- Distributed by: Alpha Violet (International); Micro Multilateral (Romania)
- Release dates: September 2021 (Golden Rose); March 25, 2022 (Romania); November 4, 2022 (Bulgaria)
- Running time: 106 minutes
- Countries: Bulgaria; Romania
- Language: Bulgarian

Fishbone (Bulgarian: Рибена кост) is a 2021 Bulgarian-Romanian fantasy drama film directed by Dragomir Sholev and written by Sholev, Emanuela Dimitrova & Georgi Merdzhanov. Starring Deyan Donkov, Suzy Radichkova & Valentin Andreev. The film was named on the shortlist for Bulgarian's entry for the Academy Award for Best International Feature Film at the 95th Academy Awards, but it was not selected. It was considered again when Mother was disqualified, however, it was not selected.

== Synopsis ==
9 situations where people are pushed to react, but they are confused, scared or too busy. 9 viewpoint towards an absurd world, in which people are like a dead dolphin - and nobody knows how to take care of it.

== Cast ==
The actors participating in this film are:

- Deyan Donkov as Ivo
- Suzy Radichkova as Katya
- Valentin Andreev – Rafe as Grandpa Chavo

== Release ==
The film had its international premiere at the end of September 2021 at Golden Rose National Film Festival. The film was commercially released on March 25, 2022, in Romanian theaters and on November 4, 2022, in Bulgarian theaters.

== Awards ==
Year	Award	Category	Recipient	Result	Ref.
2021	Golden Rose National Film Festival	Best Cinematographer	Nenad Boroevich	Won	
2021	Golden Rose National Film Festival	Union of Bulgarian Filmmakers' Award - Best Feature Film	Fishbone	Won	
2022	Sofia International Film Festival	Award of the Bulgarian Guild of Film Critics	Fishbone	Won	
