= Natalija Yefimkina =

Ukrainian-born German filmmaker

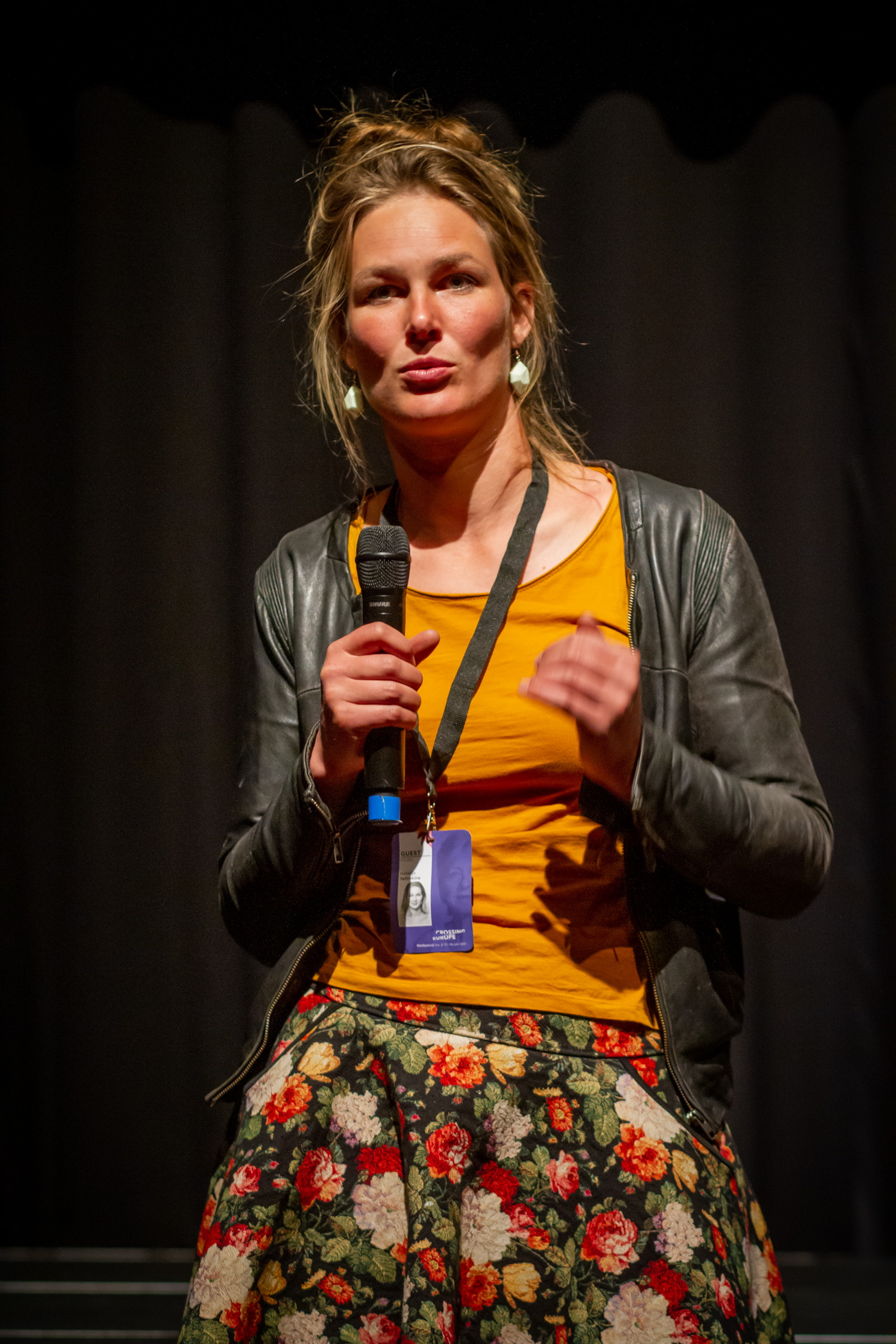
Yefimkina speaking at Crossing Europe Film Festival, Linz, 2021

Natalija Yefimkina (Ukrainian: Наталія Єфімкіна, romanized: Natalija Yefimkina; born 6 July 1983) is a Ukrainian-born German filmmaker. Her documentary Garage People (Garagenvolk) won the Heiner Carow Prize at the 70th Berlin International Film Festival. She is a resident of Berlin.

== Early life ==
Yefimkina was born in Kyiv, then-capital of the Ukrainian SSR, to a Ukrainian academic couple.

In 1986, as a result of the Chernobyl Nuclear Disaster, her and her family left Ukraine, first relocating to Siberia. 1989 the family moved back to Kyiv, where she went to school, before settling in Germany in 1995.

== Career ==
Yefimkina studied history and literature in Berlin before starting her career as an assistant director and production assistant in feature film productions. Her work experience includes being the second assistant director on the feature film Mädchen in Eis (directed by Stefan Krohmer) and the television feature film Zeit der Reife (ARD) in 2014.

She has also directed several short documentary works, such as the reportage Schau in meine Welt (KiKA) in 2015 and worked as a stringer and translator on the series From Amsterdam to Odesa (MDR/Arte) in the same year. In 2019, she served as the first assistant director on Marcus Lenz's feature film Rival.

Her directorial debut is the feature documentary Garage People (2020). She won the Eurimages Audentia Award, the Werner Herzog annual award, and Fairness award from ver.di-FilmUnion and federal acting association (BFFS) 2022.

== Filmography ==
Director

- 2019: 24H Europe: The Next Generation (TV Documentary)
- 2020: Garage People (Documentary) (also screenplay)
