= Violetta Villas (film) =

- Directed by: Karolina Bielawska
- Screenplay by: Karolina Bielawska, Małgorzata Gospodarek
- Produced by: Agnieszka Wasiak; Mariusz Włodarczyk
- Starring: Sandra Drzymalska, Antoni Tyszkiewicz, Jowita Budnik
- Cinematography: Bartosz Świniarski
- Edited by: Agnieszka Glińska
- Music by: Marcin Masecki (arrangements)
- Production company: Lava Films
- Distributed by: Kino Świat
- Release date: 27 November 2026
- Running time: 126 minutes
- Countries: Poland, Bulgaria
- Language: Polish
- Budget: PLN 18 million

Violetta Villas is a 2026 Polish-Bulgarian biographical film directed by Karolina Bielawska, about the life and career of Violetta Villas. The title role is played by Sandra Drzymalska.

The first teaser for the film was presented on 26 May 2026. The film was selected for the Main Competition of the 51st Polish Feature Film Festival in Gdynia, where its festival premiere will take place from 21 to 26 September 2026. Its Polish theatrical release is scheduled for 27 November 2026.

== Film ==
The film is a biographical drama depicting the story of Violetta Villas, one of the best-known Polish singers of the 20th century. The plot focuses on the first ten years of her career, during which the artist progressed from performing in Poland to an international career and appearances on stages in Paris and Las Vegas.

The story is told from the perspective of her son, Krzysztof Gospodarek, who observes both the development of his mother's career and its consequences for family life. The filmmakers focus on Villas's relationship with her son and on the price of fame, portraying the artist both as a singer and as a mother.

The film is directed by Karolina Bielawska, who also co-wrote the screenplay with Villas's daughter-in-law, Małgorzata Gospodarek.

The materials and story used in the making of the film were provided by the artist's son, Krzysztof. Sandra Drzymalska portrays Violetta Villas, with makeup designed by Anne Cathrine Sauerberg, Aneta Brzozowska and Thomas Foldberg.

Sauerberg and Foldberg previously worked on the film The Ugly Stepsister (2025), for which they received a nomination for the Academy Award for Best Makeup and Hairstyling.

The project is a Polish-Bulgarian co-production supported by the Polish Film Institute and the Bulgarian Film Fund.

The film is produced by the Polish company Lava Films. Its co-producers include Krzysztof Gospodarek, EC1 Łódź – City of Culture, Mazowiecki Institute of Culture, Silesia Film, and the Bulgarian production company Contrast Films.

Cinematography by Bartosz Świniarski was carried out in Warsaw, Upper Silesia, and Bulgaria.

The musical arrangements were prepared by Marcin Masecki, who created new arrangements of eight songs from Violetta Villas's repertoire for the film. They were recorded with a 23-member orchestra and combined with archival recordings of the artist's voice.

== Cast ==
The film's cast was compiled based on data from the Filmpolski.pl database.

- Sandra Drzymalska – Violetta Villas
- Kazimierz Radziejewski – Krzysiek, Violetta's son (child)
- Antoni Rembelski – Krzysiek, Violetta's son (teenager)
- Antoni Tyszkiewicz – Krzysiek, Violetta's son (adult)
- Jowita Budnik – grandmother
- Dorota Kuduk – Irena
- Cezary Łukaszewicz – Count William
- Mateusz Banasiuk – Mariusz
- Borys Szyc – Security Service officer
- Hristo Shopov – major
- Leon Zawadka – Staszek
- Michał Pawlik – photographer
- Andrzej Franczyk – doctor
- Agnieszka Gryżewska – nurse
- Jacek Borzęcki – school principal
- Alina Chechelska – housekeeper
- Wojciech Lato – radio announcer
- Dagny Mikoś – singer
- Zbigniew Wróbel – party secretary
- Beata Deutschman – secretary
- Eva Dauriac – French wardrobe assistant
- Jairo Vela – Jimmy
- Jonathan R. P. Taylor – Bob
- Gergana Spiridonova – Jacqueline
