= Hristo Shopov =

Bulgarian actor

- Христо Шопов
- Born: Hristo Naumov Shopov; 4 January 1964 (age 62); Sofia, Bulgaria
- Occupation: Actor
- Parents: Naum Shopov (father); Nevena Simeonova (mother)

Hristo Naumov Shopov (Bulgarian: Христо Наумов Шопов, [ˈxristo nɐˈumof ˈʃɔpof]; born 4 January 1964) is a Bulgarian actor. Shopov's father, Naum Shopov, was a famous Bulgarian actor as well.

He is most noted for his 2004 portrayal of Pontius Pilate in Mel Gibson's The Passion of the Christ. Shopov revived his role as Pilate in the 2006 film The Inquiry. His dual roles as Pilate make him, along with Frank Thring, one of two actors to twice portray a character directly responsible for authorizing the crucifixion of Jesus Christ. He has become one of Bulgaria's most successful actors, making his debut in 1981 with Dishay, choveche (Breathe, Man!). His body of work includes many Bulgarian films such as Vchera (Yesterday) and Sledvay me (Follow Me). He has also appeared in several low-budget US film productions including Phantom Force, Target of Opportunity and Alien Hunter. In his homeland, he is best known for his role in the movie Vchera, which became a symbol of several generations. The movie tells the story of young Bulgarians studying in an elite English language school during Communist rule.

Mary Soan, an assistant director of the film I Am David, suggested that he would be suited for the role of Pilate to Shaila Rubin, who was casting the film. After Hristo and Gibson had a brief conversation, Hristo was given the part. Shopov also played the role of Pontius Pilate in the 2006 film The Inquiry, which also cast Max von Sydow as Emperor Tiberius.

== Selected filmography ==
Year	Title	Role	Notes
1988	Vchera	Ivan	
1989	Margarit and Margarita	Margarit	
1989	Ochite Plachat Razlichno	Vasil	
2000	Death, Deceit and Destiny Aboard the Orient Express	Chief Du Train	
2001	The Grey Zone	Halivni	
2002	Pythons 2	Doctor	
2002	Interceptor Force 2	Commander Gorshkov	
2003	I Am David	The Man	
2003	Dragon Fighter	Capt. Sergei Petrov	
2003	Marines	Vladimir Antonov	
2004	Raptor Island	Quinn	
2004	The Passion of the Christ	Pontius Pilatus	
2004	Phantom Force	Commander Vukorov	
2005	Karol: A Man Who Became Pope	Julian Kordek	
2006	The Inquiry	Pontius Pilatus	
2007	The Lark Farm	Isman	
2008	Resolution 819	Momcilo Draganovic	
2009	Barbarossa	Rinaldo di Dassel	
2009	Command Performance	President Alexei Petrov	
2010	Undisputed III: Redemption	Warden Kuss	
2011	Love.net	Filip Bogatev	
2011	Operation Shmenti Capelli	Lyubev	
2012	Barabbas	Kedar	
2015	Karbala	Getow	
2017	South Wind	Dmitar Mitevski	
2026	Violetta Villas	Major Riddle	
