= SpeculatorS =

- Film poster
- Directed by: Georgi D. Kostov
- Written by: Aleksandar Chobanov; Scarlatov
- Produced by: Nickolay Christov; Martin Iliev Iliev; Scarlatov
- Starring: Aleksandar Aleksiev; Daniel Angelov; Darin Angelov; Pavela Apostolova
- Cinematography: Martin Dimitrov
- Edited by: Julian Minkov
- Music by: Maria Karakusheva
- Production company: Korund X
- Release date: May 20, 2022
- Running time: 106 minutes
- Country: Bulgaria
- Languages: Bulgarian; English

SpeculatorS (Bulgarian: Борсови играчи, lit. 'Stock market players') is a 2022 Bulgarian thriller drama film directed by Georgi D. Kostov and written by Aleksandar Chobanov & Scarlatov. Starring Aleksandar Aleksiev, Daniel Angelov, Darin Angelov and Pavela Apostolova.

The film was named on the shortlist for Bulgarian's entry for the Academy Award for Best International Feature Film at the 95th Academy Awards, but it was not selected. It was considered again when Mother was disqualified, however, it was not selected.

The movie was also nominated for the 2023 annual UBFM Awards (Union of the Bulgarian Film Makers) for Best Picture, Best Costume Design and Best Sound Design.

== Synopsis ==
Victor Angelov, a young finance professor at a top-tier Bulgarian university. His girlfriend Nikol is not happy with their relationship and she starts an affair with the highly successful box fighter Deyan. Crushed by her betrayal, Victor takes a new job at the brokerage company owned by his late father's partner, so that he can try to have Nikol back.

== Cast ==
The actors participating in this film are:

- Aleksandar Aleksiev as Victor Angelov
- Daniel Angelov as Stamen
- Boryana Bratoeva as Nicole
- Darin Angelov as Deyan Valkanov
- Marian Valev as Kamen
- Dimitar Banenkin as Ranghel Valkanov
- Radina Kardjilova as Ralitza Raykova

== Release ==
The official domestic release of the film was on May 20, 2022. It then had a premiere on September 28, 2022, at the Golden Rose Film Festival.
