= Marcin Masecki =

Polish pianist, composer, and conductor

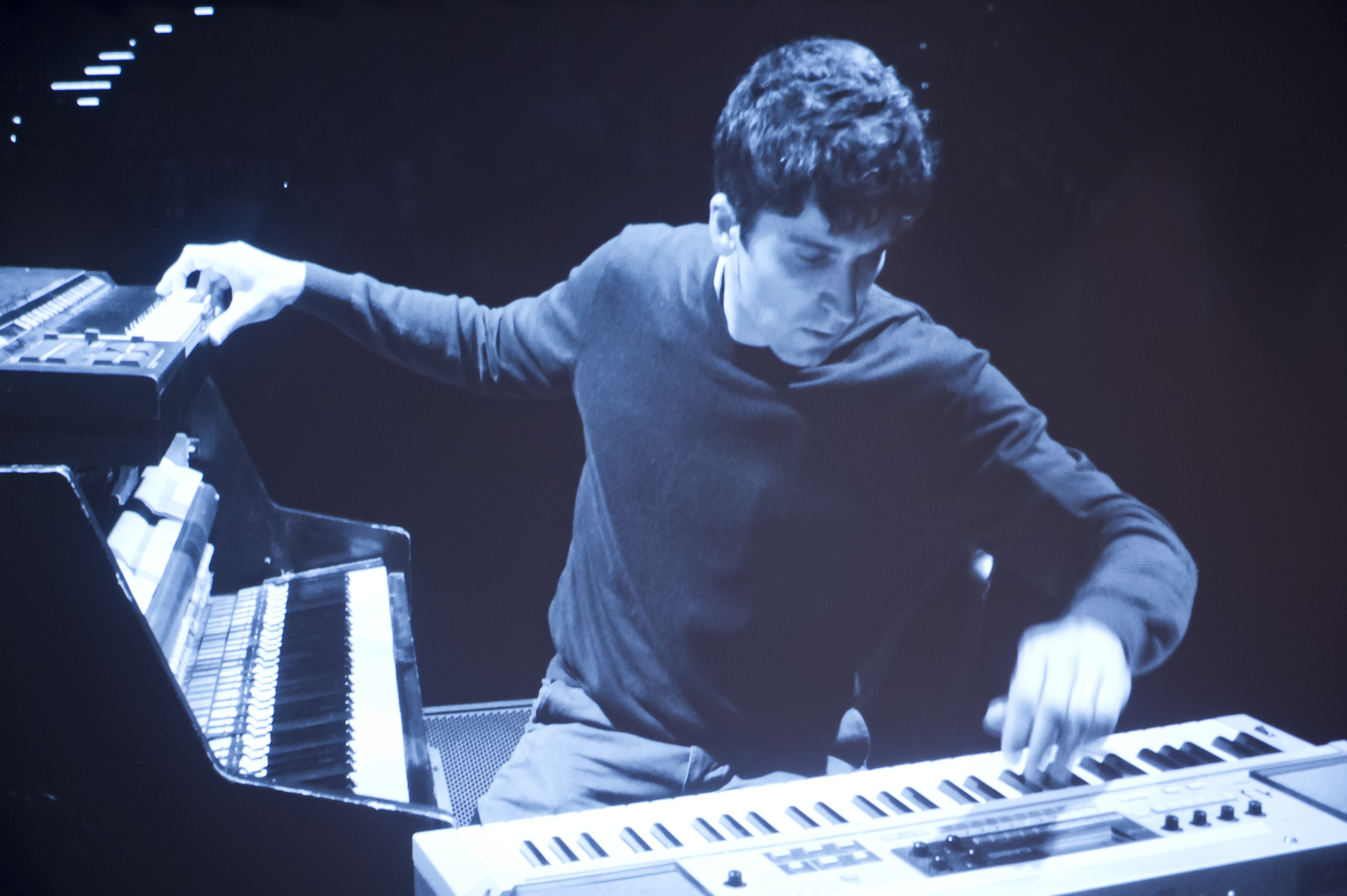

Background information
- Born: 6 September 1982 (age 42); Warsaw, Poland
- Genres: Jazz; classical
- Occupation(s): Pianist, composer
- Instrument: Piano
- Website: www.marcinmasecki.pl

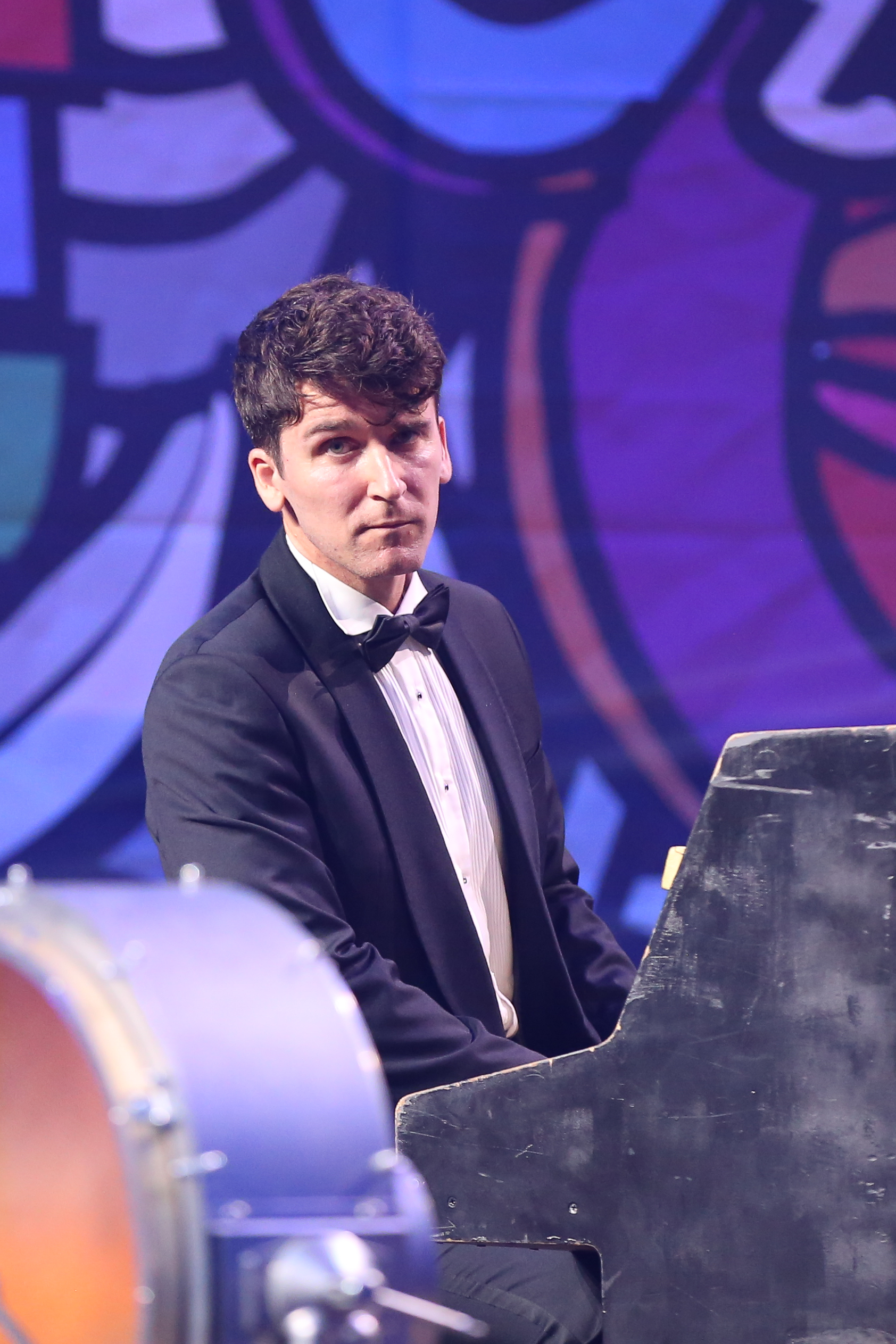
Marcin Masecki at the Pol'and'Rock Festival in 2019

Marcin Masecki (born 6 September 1982 in Warsaw) is a Polish avant garde pianist, composer and conductor. He is a graduate of Berklee College of Music. In 2005 he won the main prize at the International Jazz Piano Competition in Moscow.[1]

== Life and career ==
Masecki started taking music lessons from his father at age three. He took up piano at seven and quickly began showing talent for improvising as well as interpreting classical music. These have proven to be the two main pillars of his activity. He studied classical piano in the Chopin Secondary School in Warsaw under prof. Małgorzata Rawska and jazz piano under Andrzej Jakodziński, graduating in 1998. During his school years he frequented the legendary Wednesday jam sessions at Akwarium Jazz Club. At this time he formed his first jazz trio with Wojciech Pulcyn on bass and Grzegorz Grzyb on drums and joined the band Alchemik. Together they won the Grand Prix at the Europ Jazz Contest Hoeilaart and Masecki won the "Best Soloist" prize.

In 2002 he graduated from Berklee College of Music. Together with Ziv Ravitz and Garth Stevenson he formed the trio TAQ. He also met singer, composer Candelaria Saenz Valiente, his future wife.

Upon returning to Poland he joined the Zbigniew Wegehaupt Quartet, recording two albums "Wege" (2005) and "Tota" (2008). He continued performing with Alchemik, and electric quintet Oxen, as well as occasionally performing with pop-star Edyta Górniak. For the majority of 2008 he was member of the band Pink Freud, culminating in the release of a concert album “Alchemia”. Also in 2008 he started spending time the legendary cafe and artistic meeting hub Chłodna 25. There he met future collaborator Grzegorz Lewandowski and various musicians from the independent label Lado ABC. This marked an explosion of projects and collaborations. Together with his wife and Macio Moretti he formed the avant-pop band Paristetris. They recorded two albums ("Paristetris" 2008 and "Honeydarlin" 2010) and performed extensively. In 2008, he released an improvised concert album from Chłodna 25 with Moretti and Raphael Rogiński called “2525252525”. 2009 saw the release of his first solo album Bob, recorded in his kitchen in Buenos Aires. In 2011, he formed the jazz sextet Profesjonalizm, recording a critically acclaimed album Chopin Chopin Chopin. In 2014, he wrote and recorded a set of polonaises for his new nonet Polonezy. This album won him one of the most prestigious artistic awards in Poland - Polityka's Passport Award for Contemporary Music. Parallel to these he pursued traditional classical projects, often introducing non-classical elements. In 2013, he released Bach's Art of the Fugue recorded on an old tape dictaphone. In 2015, he released “Beethoven: The Last Sonatas” performed with ear stoppers and noise-blocking headphones, in order to experience the perspective of the deaf composer. 2017 saw the release of Chopin: Nocturnes played on his faithful companion - a small 6-octave upright piano which he rarely tunes.

Masecki is also an active composer. In 2015, he was commissioned to write a large piece for the Voluntary Firebrigade Brass Orchestra from Słupca which became his "Symphony nr 1" and was released on CD. He also composed "Wolność" for the cello ensemble Cellonet, performed at Warsaw's Royal Castle at the opening of the IX Witold Lutosławski Competition. More recently he wrote "We Are Crying" for women's choir and brass orchestra on commission from the Jazztopad Festival in Wrocław.

From 2014, he has been involved in Plac Defilad, an outdoor summer programme of Teatr Studio. In the 2015 season he played weekly classical recitals; in 2016, together with Tomasz Pokrzywiński he co-produced “Transkrypcje” a series devoted to Beethoven's complete symphonies in chamber arrangements; in 2017 they hosted a series of classical jam sessions, exploring the possibilities of improvisation within the classical framework. Every year in Plac Defilad he performs a grand ball with his big-band. In 2017 he was joined by singer Jan Młynarski. Together they will be releasing an album of polish jazz from the 20s and 30s.

In 2017 he has started performing ragtimes, his childhood passion. An album with drummer Jerzy Rogiewicz is scheduled for 2018. As session musician he has worked with Tomasz Stańko, Wojciech Waglewski, Zbigniew Namysłowski, Michał Urbaniak and Barry Guy among others. He is also regularly invited to perform with Cracow's period instrument orchestra Capella Cracoviensis.

Masecki writes for theater and film. Together with Candelaria Saenz Valiente he wrote the soundtrack to Strange Heaven by Dariusz Gajewski. In 2012, he wrote the soundtrack for the documentary Fuck the Forest by Michał Marczak. In 2017, he composed music for the film Cold War by Paweł Pawlikowski. His music was featured in plays by Wojciech Urbański (Miron Białoszewski: Tajny Dziennik) and Natalia Korczakowska (Solaris and Pasażerka).

He currently lives in Berlin, Warsaw and Buenos Aires.

== Discography (selected) ==
- “Tribute to Marek & Wacek” (Polonia Records, 1998)
- “Alchemik - Acoustic Jazz Sextet” - (Alchemik, 1999)
- “Gdzie są Te Melodie z Tamtych Lat” (Polish Radio, 2000)
- “Alchemik - Sfera Szeptów” (Alchemik, 2001)
- “Oxen - Nexo” (Alchemik, 2002)
- “Alchemik - Dracul in Bucharest” (Alchemik 2004)
- “TAQ - Live in Mińsk Mazowiecki” (Rubicon Records, 2006)
- "Mięso" (CD-R, 2007)
- “Ragiński / Masecki / Moretti - 2525252525” (Lado ABC 2008)
- “Paristetris" (Lado ABC 2008)
- "Bob" (Lado ABC, 2009)
- "John" (Lado ABC, 2010)
- “Honeydralin” (Lado ABC, 2010)
- "Profesjonalizm - Chopin Chopin Chopin" (Lado ABC 2011)
- "Die Kunst Der Fuge" (Lado ABC. 2012)
- "Polonezy" (Lado ABC, 2013)
- "Scarlatti" (For Tune, 2013)
- "Bach Rewrite - Masecki / Orzechowski / Capella Cracoviensis" - (Universal Music, 2013)
- "El pueblo unido jamas sera vencido" (Bôłt Records, 2014)
- “Saenz Valiente / Masecki - Hymnen” (Bôłt Records, 2014)
- "Mazurki" (For Tune, 2015)
- "Beethoven: Last Piano Sonatas" (Lado ABC, 2015)
- "Symfonia nr. 1 'Zwycięstwo'" with Voluntary Firebrigade Brass Orchestra of Słupca (Turning Sounds, 2016)
- "Chopin: Nokturny" (Lado ABC, 2017)

== See also ==
- Music of Poland
- List of Polish composers
- List of Poles
