= Lilia Abadjieva =

Bulgarian theatre director

Lilia Abadjieva (Bulgarian: Лилия Абаджиева; ) is a Bulgarian theatre director, known for her re-interpretations of Shakespeare's plays. She has taken part in a number of international festivals and received numerous awards.

== Biography ==
Lilia Abadjieva was born in Sofia. In 1998 she was awarded a master's degree in theatre direction by the National Academy of Theatre and Film Arts in Sofia. By 2008, Abadjieva became artist in residence at Westmont College

She has been directing film and theatre productions in Eastern and Central Europe for more than ten years. Many of these productions were re-interpretations of Shakespearian tragedies. Her avant-garde work is unconventional and controversial. She describes herself as l'enfant terrible of Bulgarian theatre.

Abadjieva focusses on deconstructing classic works, then rebuilding them in a form of "cultural travesty". For example, she would rebuild Shakespeare's Othello or Measure for Measure in the style of punk rock, recreating them in a fast-paced montage of selected scenes, in a manner reminiscent of MTV. Her performances have been described as "post-totalitaian 1990s were defined by textually fragmented, physically expressive adaptations" of Shakespeare.

Abadjieva's productions include Shakespeare's Othello, Hamlet, Romeo and Juliet, and Measure for Measure, Gogol's The Government Inspector, Goethe's The Sorrows of Young Werther and Beckett's Waiting for Godot

== Awards ==
Amongst other awards, she received an award from the Ministry of Culture of Bulgaria for developing and disseminating Bulgarian culture, and in 2005 she won the Union of Bulgarian Artist's award for the best play of the season for her production of Othello for the Bulgarian National Theatre.

She also received awards for productions in Egypt, North Macedonia, and Russia.

== See also ==
- List of theatre directors in the 20th and 21st centuries
