= TV7 (Bulgarian TV channel) =

Bulgarian television channel

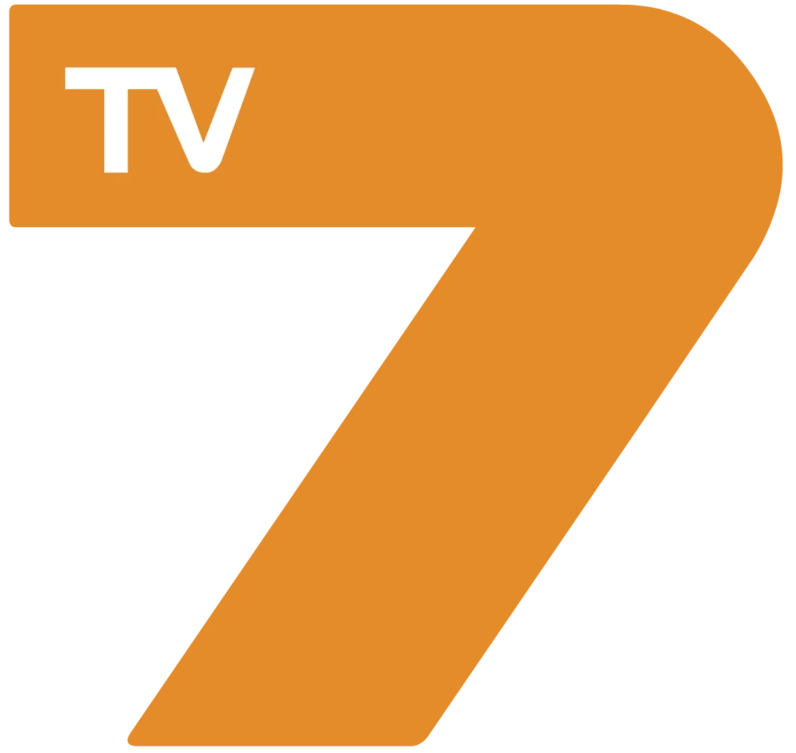
- Country: Bulgaria
- Headquarters: Sofia, Bulgaria

Programming
- Language: Bulgarian
- Picture format: 16:9

Ownership
- Owner: Crown Media EAD (ProSiebenSat.1 Media)
- Sister channels: News7, Sport7, Super7

History
- Launched: 7 November 2005
- Closed: 17 September 2016

Links
- Website: www.tv7.bg

TV7 ("TV sedem") was a Bulgarian television channel, owned by Crown Media EAD (ProSiebenSat.1 Media). It aired entertainment programs, TV series and films, and was also the first Bulgarian station to broadcast in widescreen PAL (16:9, although the aspect ratio was usually left as 4:3, making the image appearing vertically elongated on normal TV sets). The channel was available terrestrially in over 50 cities and towns, thus comprising the fifth national free-to-view TV network in Bulgaria and also on cable television and satellite.

In August 2007 TV7 launched two sister channels: Super7, a kids' channel, and Sport7, a sports channel. Sport7, which was made in partnership with the digital television operator Cabletel was closed in 2009 due to problems with sponsorship. The channel was resumed in 2013. In 2010 the channels changed their graphic design and logos. The channel, along with News7 and Sport7 holds the rights to the Bulgarian Football Championship. On 18 March 2012 the channel changed their graphic design and logos again and began broadcasting in 16:9. On 7 March 2013 it launched a sister news channel – News7. TV7 ceased broadcasting of original programming on 1 February 2016 following its bankruptcy. The channel was officially closed down on 17 September 2016, after its broadcasting license was taken down by the Bulgarian Council for Electronic Media.
