= Original Soundtrack (disambiguation) =

An original soundtrack or simply known as soundtrack is recorded music accompanying and synchronized to the images of a motion picture, television program, or video game.

Original Soundtrack may also refer to the following:

- The Original Soundtrack, a 1975 rock album by 10cc
- Original Soundtrack (album), a 1989 acid house album by S'Express
- Original Soundtracks 1, a 1995 album by U2
