= Path of Destruction (film) =

- Written by: Chase Parker
- Directed by: Stephen Furst
- Starring: Danica McKellar; Chris Pratt; David Keith; Franklin Dennis Jones
- Original language: English

Production
- Producers: Jeffery Beach; Phillip J. Roth; T.J. Sakasegawa
- Running time: 86 minutes
- Production company: United Films Organisation
- Budget: $1.8 million

Original release
- Network: Sci Fi Channel
- Release: September 24, 2005

Path of Destruction is a 2005 made-for-TV Sci-Fi Channel original film. It concerns a nanotechnology experiment gone awry.

== Plot ==
Nanomachines accidentally released into the atmosphere form a large storm disintegrating anything in its way. Colonel Thomas Miller sends groups of fighter jets to destroy the storm, but they fail. As the storm threatens to grow into a worldwide one, Miller proposes destroying it with a nuclear missile. After extensive research, reporter Katherine Stern and meteorologist Nathan S. McCain counterpropose hitting the storm with a giant electromagnetic pulse (EMP), but the military is reluctant to go with the plan. Miller suggests using a specially designed aircraft called Icarus to detonate the EMP. The nuclear missile is launched as Katherine, Nathan, and Miller take off in Icarus.

The nanomachines damage Icarus, preventing it from deploying the EMP device. Miller then has Katherine and Nathan escape in two escape pods while he detonates the EMP manually, killing himself and destroying the storm. The missile strike is then aborted.

The deactivated nanomachines then fall to the ground as Katherine and Nathan crash land in the ocean. Sometime later, Katherine is reporting the story on air, and she and Nathan prepare to go on a date after.

== Reception ==
Sloan Freer of Radio Times rated it 1/5 stars and called it an "increasingly ridiculous sci-fi yarn" with "a laughably unbelievable climax." Matt Paprocki of Blogcritics called it a bland film that borrows from the Michael Crichton's novel Prey.
