= Trieste Film Festival =

Italian film festival

- Official poster for 37th edition
- Location: Trieste, Italy
- Founded: 1989
- Most recent: 2025
- Awards: Premio del pubblico; Premio Trieste; Premio TSFF Corti offerto dalla Fondazione Osiride Brovedani
- Hosted by: The Alpe Adria Cinema Association
- Artistic director: Nicoletta Romeo
- No. of films: 130 in 2025
- Festival date: Opening: 16 January 2026; Closing: 24 January 2026
- Website: www.triestefilmfestival.it

Current: 37th
- 38th 36th

The Trieste Film Festival is an international film festival founded in 1989. Held annually on the third week of January in Trieste, it has become the leading festival of Central and Eastern Europe cinema in Italy.

The 36th edition of the festival took place from 16 to 24 January 2025. The festival dedicated to Central Eastern European cinema presented 130 films. In this edition the festival had double opening: the first evening with Wishing on a Star by Slovak-Hungarian author Peter Kerekes, followed by the Italian premiere of Dying by Matthias Glasner, a German comedy-drama. The festival closed with Crossing by Levan Akin.

The 37th edition of the festival took place from 16 to 24 January 2026. In the Wild Roses section of the festival the focused on the female directors from Slovenia.
