= National Academy for Theatre and Film Arts =

Performing arts institute in Sofia, Bulgaria

Coordinates: 42°41′32.26″N 23°19′33.72″E

- Type: Public
- Established: 1948; 78 years ago
- Rector: Miroslav Datchev
- Academic staff: 259
- Students: 700 (approx.)
- Location: Sofia, Bulgaria
- Campus: Urban
- Affiliations: CILECT; ELIA; Cumulus Association
- Website: www.natfiz.bg

The Krastyo Sarafov National Academy for Theatre and Film Arts (Note: Bulgarian: Национална академия за театрално и филмово изкуство "Кръстьо Сарафов") (commonly referred to as NATFIZ) (Note: An abbreviation of the Academy's name in Bulgarian.) is a performing, cinematic and media arts institution of higher education based in Sofia. It is the first Bulgarian university in the field of theatre and film arts. It was founded in 1948, being the only public and state-run institution of its kind in the country.

The academy enrolls about 120 new students every year, including 20 international students. It is located in three adjacent buildings in downtown Sofia: a Training Drama Theatre (est. 1957), a Training Puppet Theatre (est. 1966), a cinema and video hall and an educational audiovisual centre, as well as an academic information centre that stores 60,000 volumes of Bulgarian and international literature. NATFA has a student dormitory in Studentski grad.

== History ==
After the Second World War, there were changes in the political, economic and social life in Bulgaria. Higher education became free of charge which allowed more young people to pursue a career in theatre. The number of theatres also increased, which led to the need for more actors and directors. The academy started off as a temporary, two-year theatre course at the Ivan Vazov National Theater. Subsequently, as Bulgarian press raised the idea of creating a higher theatre school, it turned into the first Bulgarian State Higher Theater School in 1948.

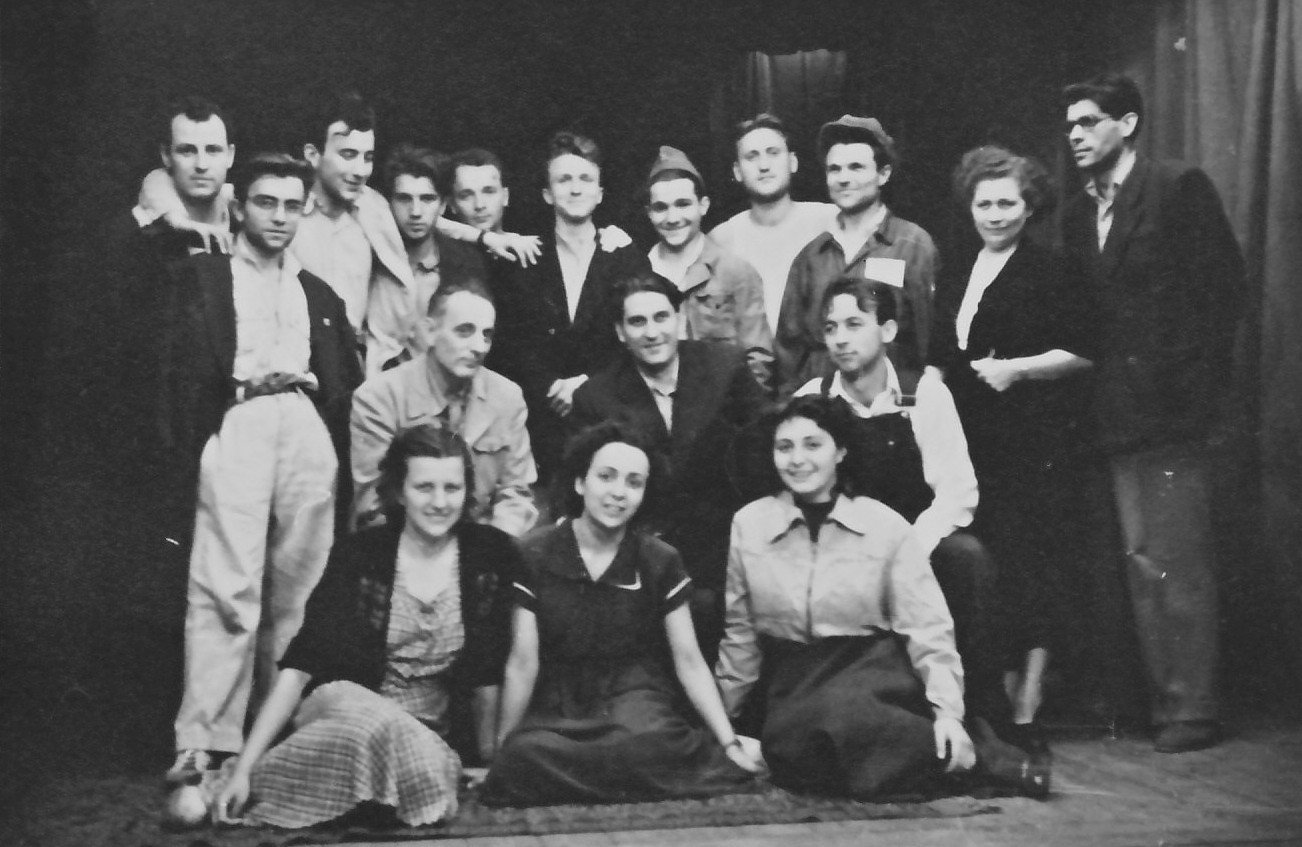
Boyan Danovski's 1952 directing class

In its first class, 22 students were admitted in acting and 9 were admitted in directing, and two years later there were 16 new students in theater studies. Initially, the duration of all courses was four years, but it was later extended to five for directors and theater critics. The school's first seventeen teachers were prominent experts in theater art and theater critics. Over the years, the number of teachers increased and the curriculum improved.

Dimitar Mitov, a prominent author, publicist and literary and theater critic, was appointed as the first rector. The School was initially housed at 43 Vasil Levski Boulevard, but the building turned out to be too small to accommodate all of its students. In 1951, to commemorate the 75th anniversary of Krastyo Sarafov’s birth, the school was named after him, and in 1954 it was renamed to Krastyo Sarafov Higher Institute of Theater Arts.

In 1955, the Institute received a new building with three stages and a larger audience capacity, located at 108A Rakovski Street. The Training Drama Theater, one of the institute's main units, was inaugurated in 1957. The amphitheater hall has 430 seats. In 1962, the Institute introduced a puppetry acting course. A decade later, directing for puppet theater was also added. In 1966, the Training Puppet Theater was inaugurated with a performance of The Carnival of the Animals to the music of Camille Saint-Saëns, directed and written by Nikolina Georgieva. It is located at 20 Stefan Karadja Street and has a hall with 100 seats. In 1973, new courses such as filmmaking and cinematography were added to the institute's curriculum.

On 1 August 1995, the university received its current name: Krastyo Sarafov National Academy for Theater and Film Arts.

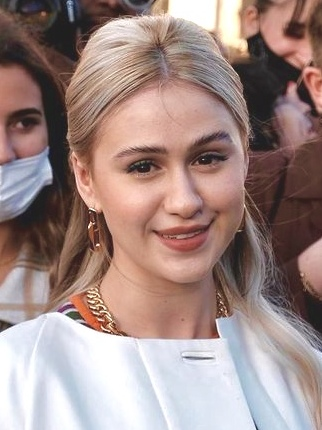
Maria Bakalova, Academy Award-nominated actress

== Notable alumni ==
- Rashid Yassin, (g. 1969) B.A. in theatre science, journalist, poet, and author, (1931–2012).
- Maria Bakalova, (g. 2019) Academy Award-nominated actress, (1996-)
