= Golden Rose Bulgarian Feature Film Festival =

The Golden Rose Bulgarian Feature Film Festival (Bulgarian: Фестивалът на българския игрален филм „Златна роза“) is held in Varna in September or October. Also known as Golden Rose National Film Festival or simply Golden Rose Film Festival, the event was first held in August 1961 under the name "Bulgarian Film Festival"; it ran annually until 1974 (other than 1965) and after that it was usually held every two years. The 34th Golden Rose Film Festival was held September 19 to 25, 2016.

== Awards ==
The first time the festival was held, in 1961, the prize-winning film was We Were Young. The top award was originally called the Special Award of the Festival, but in 1963 the name was changed to "Golden Rose". It is also referred to as the Grand Prix. A statuette for the Golden Rose was designed by sculptor Vezhdi Rashidov. However, for the 40th anniversary of the festival a new statuette was commissioned by the National Film Center to renown artist Nadia Rozeva.

As of 2016, the festival has ten awards determined by its jury, and five other awards:

- Golden Rose Award for Best Feature Film
- Golden Rose Award for Best Short Film
- Special Award of the City of Varna
- Best Director Award
- Best Screenwriter Award
- Best Cinematographer Award
- Best Actress Award
- Best Actor Award
- Best Feature Film Debut
- Honourable Special Prize
- The Union of Bulgarian Filmmakers Award
- The Critics Guild Award (UBF)
- Special Mention for Short Film
- People's Choice Award
- Accredited Journalists' Award
