= Dolph Lundgren on screen and stage =

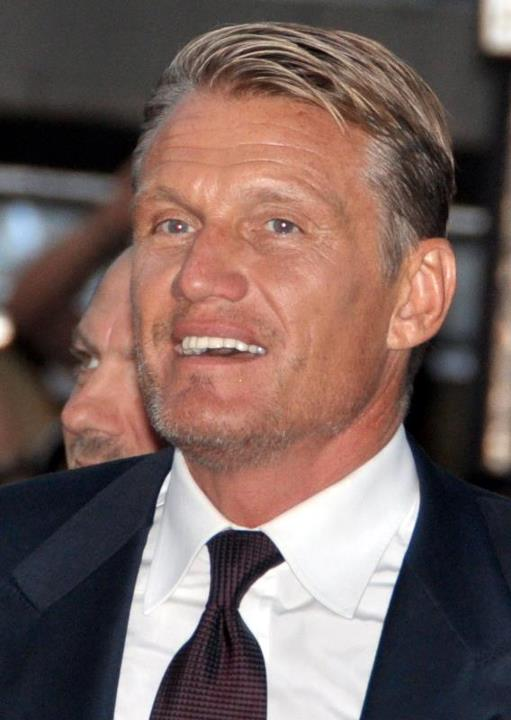
At the premiere of The Expendables 2 in August 2012

Dolph Lundgren is a Swedish actor, filmmaker, and martial artist. Lundgren's breakthrough came in 1985, when he starred in Rocky IV as the imposing Soviet boxer Ivan Drago. Since then, he has starred in more than 93 films, almost all of them in the action genre.

Lundgren received a degree in chemical engineering from the Royal Institute of Technology in the early 1980s and a master's degree in chemical engineering from the University of Sydney in 1982. He holds the rank of 4th dan black belt in Kyokushin karate and was European champion in 1980–81. While in Sydney, he became a bodyguard for Jamaican singer Grace Jones and began a relationship with her. He received a Fulbright scholarship to MIT and moved to Boston. Jones convinced him to leave the university and move to New York City to be with her and begin acting, where, after a short stint as a model and bouncer at the Manhattan nightclub The Limelight, Lundgren got a small debut role as a KGB henchman in the James Bond film A View to a Kill.

After appearing in Rocky IV, Lundgren portrayed He-Man in the 1987 science fantasy film Masters of the Universe, Lt. Rachenko in Red Scorpion (1988) and Frank Castle in the 1989 film The Punisher. Throughout the 1990s he appeared in films such as I Come in Peace (1990), Cover Up (1991), Showdown in Little Tokyo (1991), Universal Soldier film series (1992, 2009, 2012), Joshua Tree (1993), Pentathlon (1994), Men of War (1994), Johnny Mnemonic (1995), The Shooter (1995), Silent Trigger (1996), The Peacekeeper (1997), and Blackjack (1998). In 2004 he directed his first film, The Defender, and subsequently directed The Mechanik (2005), Missionary Man (2007), Command Performance (2009), Icarus (2010), Castle Falls (2021) and Wanted Man (2024), also starring in all of them.

After a long spell performing in direct-to-video films since 1995, Lundgren returned to Hollywood in 2010 with the role of Gunnar Jensen in The Expendables, alongside Sylvester Stallone and an all-action star cast. He reprised his role in The Expendables 2 (2012) and The Expendables 3 (2014). Also in 2014, he co-starred in Skin Trade, an action thriller about human trafficking he co-wrote and produced. He reprised his role of Ivan Drago in Creed II (2018), and reprised his role as Gunner Jensen in Expend4bles. He appears in Sharknado 5: Global Swarming (2017), playing the protagonist's son Gil as an adult, and in Aquaman (2018) as Nereus, the father of Mera. He also had a recurring role in the fifth season of Arrow.

== Film ==
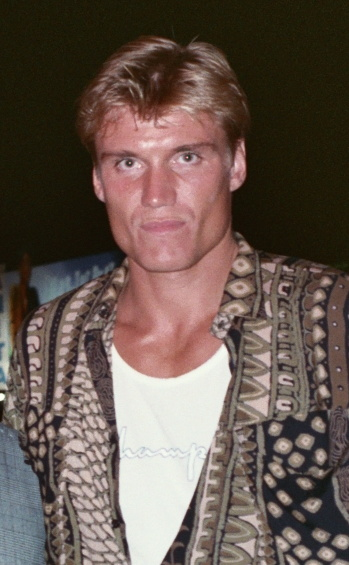
At the premier of Air America in 1990

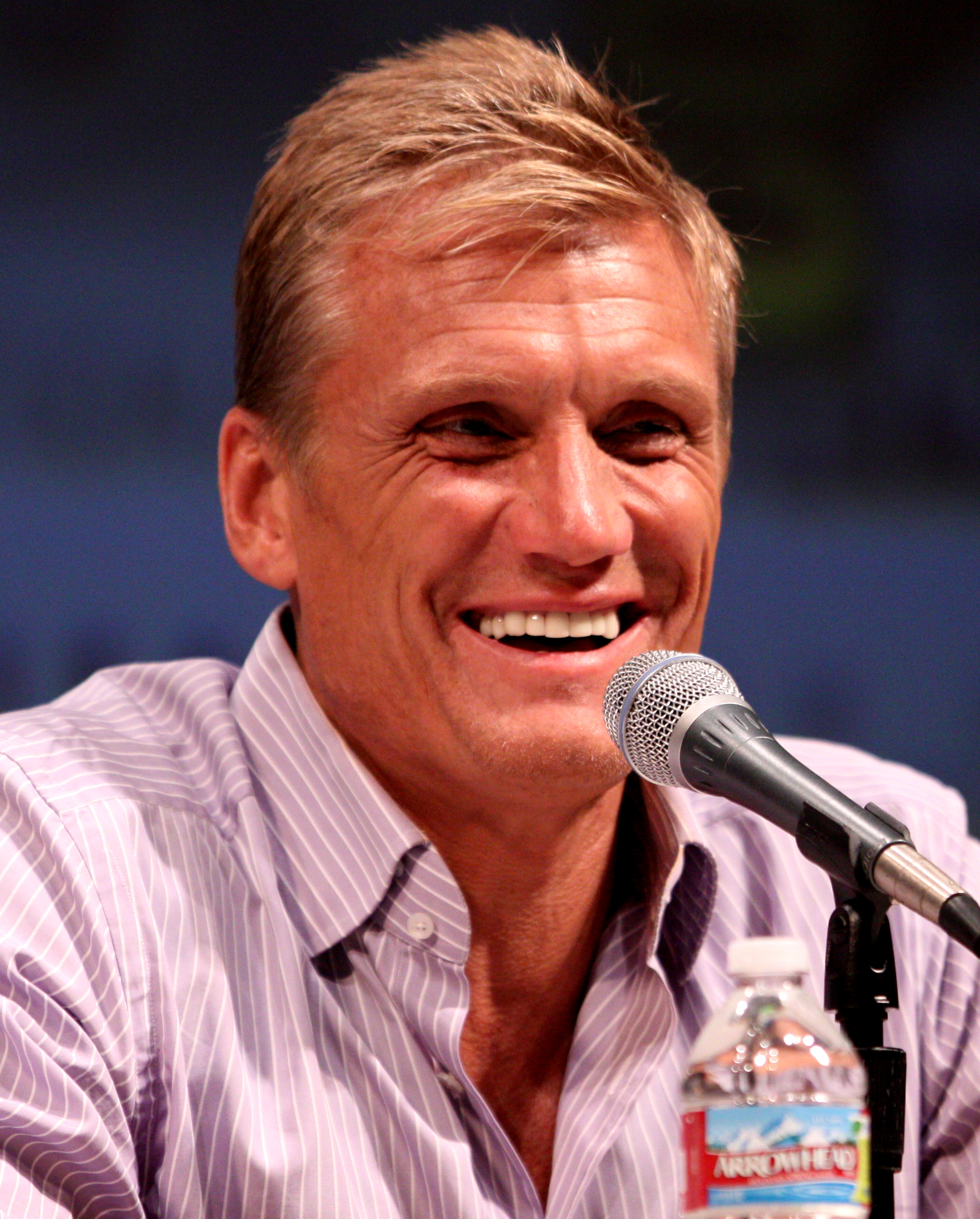
At San Diego Comic-Con in July 2010

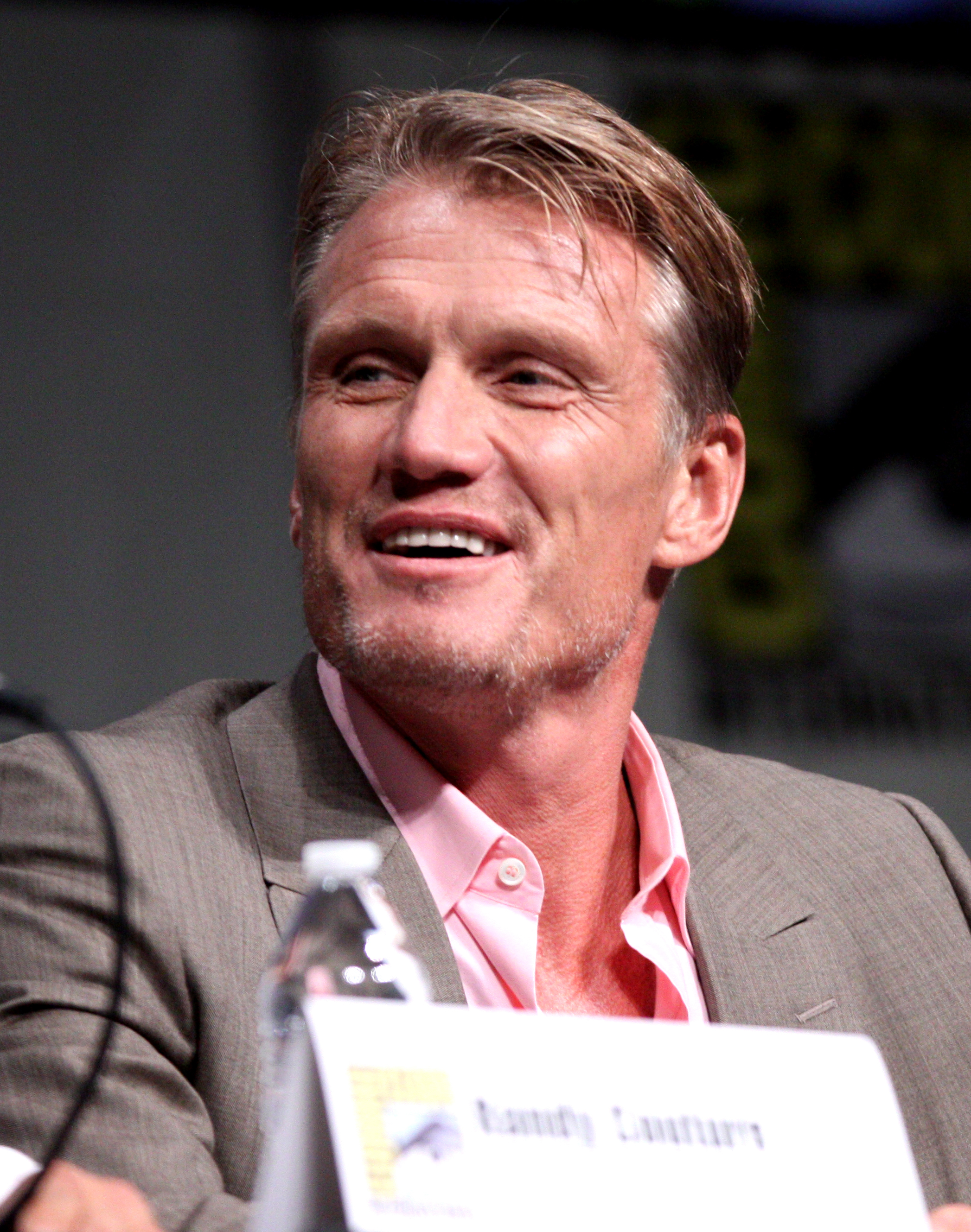
At San Diego Comic-Con in July 2012

Year	Title	Role	Notes	Ref.
1985	A View to a Kill	KGB Agent Venz	Cameo	
1985	Rocky IV	Captain Ivan Drago		
1987	Masters of the Universe	He-Man		
1987	Maximum Potential	Himself	Direct-to-video; also writer	
1988	Red Scorpion	Lieutenant Nikolai Petrovitch Rachenko		
1988	R.P.G. II	Lifeguard	Short film; cameo	
1989	The Punisher	Francis "Frank" Castle / The Punisher	Direct-to-video	
1990	I Come in Peace	Detective Jack Caine		
1991	Cover Up	Mike Anderson	Direct-to-video	
1991	Showdown in Little Tokyo	Sergeant Chris Kenner		
1992	Universal Soldier	Sergeant Andrew Scott / GR13		
1993	Joshua Tree	Wellman Anthony Santee	Direct-to-video	
1994	Sunny Side Up	Himself	Cameo	
1994	Pentathlon	Eric Brogar	Direct-to-video; also executive producer	
1994	Men of War	Nick Gunar	Direct-to-video	
1995	Johnny Mnemonic	Karl "The Street Preacher" Honig		
1995	The Shooter	U.S. Marshal Michael Dane	Direct-to-video	
1996	Silent Trigger	Waxman "Shooter"	Direct-to-video	
1997	The Peacekeeper	Major Frank Cross	Direct-to-video	
1998	The Minion	Lukas Sadorov	Direct-to-video	
1998	Sweepers	Christian Erickson	Direct-to-video	
1999	Bridge of Dragons	Warchild	Direct-to-video	
1999	Storm Catcher	Major Jack Holloway	Direct-to-video	
2000	Jill Rips	Matt Sorenson	Direct-to-video	
2000	The Last Warrior	Captain Nick Preston	Direct-to-video	
2000	Agent Red	Captain Matt Hendricks	Direct-to-video	
2001	Hidden Agenda	NSA Agent Jason Price	Direct-to-video	
2003	Detention	Sam Decker	Direct-to-video	
2004	Direct Action	Sergeant Frank Gannon	Direct-to-video	
2004	Fat Slags	Randy	Cameo	
2004	Retrograde	Captain John Foster	Direct-to-video	
2004	The Defender	Lance Rockford	Direct-to-video; also director	
2005	The Mechanik	Nikolai "Nick" Cherenko	Direct-to-video; also story and director	
2006	The Inquiry	Brixos		
2007	Diamond Dogs	Xander Ronson	Direct-to-video; also uncredited director and executive producer	
2007	Missionary Man	Ryder	Limited release; also writer and director	
2009	Direct Contact	Mike Riggins	Direct-to-video	
2009	Command Performance	Joe Reynolds	Direct-to-video; also writer and director	
2009	Universal Soldier: Regeneration	Sergeant Andrew Scott	Limited release	
2010	Icarus	Edward "Eddie" Genn / Icarus	Limited release; also director	
2010	The Expendables	Gunner Jensen		
2011	In the Name of the King 2: Two Worlds	Granger	Direct-to-video	
2012	Small Apartments	Dr. Sage Mennox	Limited release	
2012	Stash House	Andy Spector	Limited release; also executive producer	
2012	One in the Chamber	Aleksey "The Wolf" Andreev	Direct-to-video	
2012	The Expendables 2	Gunner Jensen		
2012	Universal Soldier: Day of Reckoning	Sergeant Andrew Scott	Limited release	
2012	The Package	"The German"	Limited release	
2013	Legendary	Jim Harker	Direct-to-video	
2013	Battle of the Damned	Major Max Gatling	Limited release; also executive producer	
2013	Ambushed	DEA Agent Evan Maxwell	Direct-to-video; also producer	
2013	Blood of Redemption	Axel "The Swede"	Direct-to-video	
2014	Puncture Wounds	Hollis	Direct-to-video; also producer	
2014	The Expendables 3	Gunner Jensen		
2014	Skin Trade	Detective Nick Cassidy	Limited release; also writer/story and producer	
2015	War Pigs	Captain Hans Picault	Limited release	
2015	The Good, the Bad, and the Dead	DEA Agent Bob Rooker	Direct-to-video	
2015	Shark Lake	Clint Gray	Limited release; also producer	
2015	Riot	Agent William	Direct-to-video	
2015	Malchishnik	Natasha's Husband	Cameo	
2016	Hail, Caesar!	Submarine Commander	Uncredited еxtra	
2016	Kindergarten Cop 2	FBI Agent Zack Reed	Direct-to-video; also executive producer	
2016	Don't Kill It	Jebediah Woodley	Limited release; also executive producer	
2016	Female Fight Club	Sam Holt	Limited release	
2016	Welcome to Willits	Officer Derek Hutchinson	Limited release	
2017	Larceny	Jack	Direct-to-video	
2017	Altitude	Matthew Sharpe	Limited release	
2017	Dead Trigger	Captain Kyle Walker	Limited release	
2018	Black Water	Marco	Limited release	
2018	Creed II	Captain Ivan Drago		
2018	Aquaman	King Nereus		
2019	The Tracker	Aiden Hakansson	Limited release	
2019	Acceleration	Vladik Zorich	Limited release	
2019	Hard Night Falling	Michael Anderson	Direct-to-video; also producer	
2021	Pups Alone	Victor	Limited release	
2021	Seal Team	Dolph	Voice role	
2021	Castle Falls	Richard Ericson	Limited release; also director and producer	
2022	Minions: The Rise of Gru	Svengeance	Voice role	
2022	Section Eight	Captain Tom Mason	Limited release; also executive producer	
2022	Operation Seawolf	Captain Hans Kessler	Limited release	
2022	Come Out Fighting	Major Chase Anderson	Direct-to-video	
2023	The Best Man	Anders	Limited release	
2023	Expend4bles	Gunner Jensen		
2023	Showdown at the Grand	Claude Luc Hallyday	Limited release	
2023	Aquaman and the Lost Kingdom	King Nereus		
2024	Wanted Man	Detective Travis Johansen	Limited release; аlso writer, director and producer	
2025	Dolph: Unbreakable	Himself	Documentary film; also executive producer	
2025	Exit Protocol	Charles Managold	Limited release	
2026	Hellfire	Sheriff Wiley	Streaming release	
2026	Holiguards Saga — The Portal of Force	Monk		
2026	Mike & Nick & Nick & Alice	"The Barron"	Streaming release; cameo	
2026	Masters of the Universe	"Macho-Man"	Cameo	
2026	Straight Shot	Armand Stoker	Streaming release	
2026	One Last Shot	Admiral Mulholland	Streaming release	
TBA	Mutant Year Zero	TBA	Voice role; filming	
TBA	A Man Will Rise	Unknown	Uncompleted	

== Television ==
Year	Title	Role	Notes	Ref.
1998	Blackjack	U.S. Marshal Jack Devlin	Television pilot for an unproduced TV series	
2010	Chuck	Marco	Episode: "Chuck Versus the Anniversary"	
2013–2014	SAF3	Captain John Eriksson	12 episodes	
2015	Workaholics	Himself	Episode: "Blood Drive"	
2015	Sanjay and Craig	Himself	Episode: "Huggle Day"; voice role	
2016–2017	Arrow	Konstantin Kovar	6 episodes	
2017	Tour de Pharmacy	Gustav Ditters	Television film; cameo	
2017	Sharknado 5: Global Swarming	Mature Gil Shepard	Television film; cameo	
2018	Broken Sidewalk	Herb	Episode: "Pilot"	
2019	It's Always Sunny in Philadelphia	John Thundergun	Episode: "Thunder Gun 4: Maximum Cool"; cameo	
2025	The White House Pod - Dare to Dream	Guest	Episode: "The White House Pod - Dare to Dream - With Action Film Superstar, Dolph Lundgren"	
2025	The Rats: A Witcher Tale	Brehen	Netflix television special	
2026	History's Greatest Machines with Dolph Lundgren	Himself - Host	8 episodes; also executive producer for 8 episodes	

== Theatre ==
Year	Title	Role	Venue	Notes	Ref.
1994	Another Octopus	Unknown	Unknown		
1994	Watching Fire	Unknown	Unknown		
1995	Force Majeure	Death-Row Prisoner	Unknown		

== Music videos ==
Year	Title	Role	Performer	Notes	Ref.
1992	"Body Count's in the House"	Himself	Body Count	Uncredited cameo	
2006	"Kosmosa"	Submarine Captain	Irson Kudikova		
2017	"Believer"	Boxer	Imagine Dragons		

== Soundtrack appearances ==
Year	Title	Song	Notes	Ref.
1988	Red Scorpion	"State Anthem of the Soviet Union"		
2009	Command Performance	"Breakdown", "Girl"		
2010	Melodifestivalen 2010	"A Little Less Conversation", "Eye of the Tiger"	2 episodes	
2010	Gylne tider	"Let It Be"	Episode: "Episode #4.3"	

== Video games ==
Year	Title	Voice role	Notes	Ref.
2012	The Expendables 2 Videogame	Gunner Jensen		
2025	Marvel's Deadpool VR	Ultimo		
