= Command performance =

Command performance may refer to:

- Command Performance (1931 film), starring Neil Hamilton and Una Merkel
- Command Performance (1937 film), starring Arthur Tracy and Lilli Palmer
- Command Performance (2009 film), starring Dolph Lundgren and Melissa Smith
- Command Performance (radio series), a US Armed Forces Radio show from 1942 to 1949
- "Command Performance" (The Orville), a 2017 television episode

== See also ==
- Royal Command Performance, a theatrical or musical performance requested by the monarch of the UK
