= Diamond Dogs (film) =

- Official DVD cover
- Directed by: Samuel Dolhasca; Dolph Lundgren (uncredited)
- Written by: Léopold St-Pierre; Frank Valdez
- Produced by: Shimon Dotan; Louis Liu
- Starring: Dolph Lundgren; Yu Nan; Xue Zuren; William Shriver; Raicho Vasilev; Zhang Chunnian
- Cinematography: Xiaobing Rao
- Edited by: Gaétan Huot
- Music by: Larry Cohen
- Production companies: Golden Ocean Entertainment; Moonstone Entertainment
- Distributed by: Moonstone Entertainment; Sony Pictures Home Entertainment
- Release dates: August 31, 2007 (Germany); December 14, 2007 (China); July 2008 (Canada)
- Running time: 94 minutes
- Countries: Canada; China
- Languages: English; Mandarin

Diamond Dogs is a 2007 Canadian-Chinese (American) action film directed by Samuel Dolhasca and uncredited co-directed by Dolph Lundgren, who also starred in the film. The film was released on direct-to-DVD in the United States on April 29, 2008.

== Plot ==
The story of Diamond Dogs concerns a group of American fortune hunters who hire a mercenary called Xander Ronson (Lundgren) to act as their guide and bodyguard, while they search for a priceless Buddhist artifact deep within the Chinese wilderness. They get more than they bargained for, however, as they come face to face with Russian mercenaries also after the artifact.

== Cast ==
- Dolph Lundgren as Xander Ronson
- Yu Nan as Anika
- Xue Zuren as Ang Shaw
- William Shriver as Chambers
- Raicho Vasilev as Zhukov
- Zhang Chunnian as "Eye Patch"

== Production ==
The film was set mostly in Inner Mongolia, from 19 September 2006 and 2 November 2006. The production faced difficult and unanticipated circumstances. Dolph Lundgren stepped up to direct the picture instead of co-producer Shimon Dotan after just a few days into filming.

== Release ==
The film came out as a direct to DVD release. The DVD release dates are as follows:

- Germany – 31 August 2007
- China – 14 December 2007
- Brazil – 17 January 2008
- USA – 29 April 2008
