= Irson Kudikova =

Russian singer (born 1982)

Irson Kudikova Ирсон Кудикова
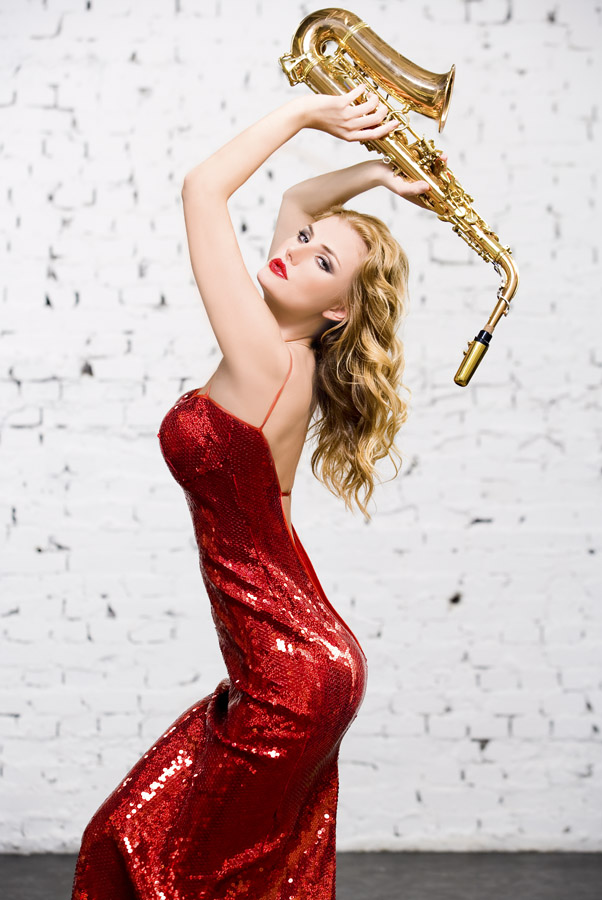
- Irson Kudikova

Background information
- Born: Irina Igorevna Nusinova; 17 September 1982 (age 44)
- Genres: Pop, Russian pop
- Occupations: Singer, model, saxophonist, music producer

Irina Igorevna Nusinova (Russian: Ирина Игоревна Нусинова; born 17 September 1982), better known by her stage name Irson Kudikova (Russian: Ирсон Кудикова), is a Russian pop singer, model, saxophonist, and music producer. She was a contestant in the Russian television music competition, Star Factory-5.

In 2005, Kudikova had a photo shoot for Maxim magazine. Some of her music is featured in the Dolph Lundgren film Command Performance.

== Early years ==
Kudikova was born on 17 September 1982 in Moscow. When she was a child she finished music school for violin, was a "master of sports" in basketball and made the Russian Olympic Reserve.

== Career ==
When Kudikova was 15, she was invited to be the soloist for the group "Children of vinil" with the support of Alexander Tsekalo. She first realized she had a career at being a vocalist after singing in a duet at a concert. She received a praise from the audience for her performance.

After the discovery of Kudikova's, she would go on to start a career as a variety singer. She has received voice training from various vocal teachers and began the saxophone and piano.

== Factory of stars ==
In 2004, Kudikova was a participant in the teleproject "Alla Pugacheva's Star Factory-5". She gained popularity to a wider audience after singing the song "Why" in her first performance in the competition.

Some of the songs performed by Kudikova during "Alla Pugacheva's Star Factory-5" became hits, for instance: "By Long evenings" and "Forgive me". Kudikova performed in duets with other competitors, such as; Alla Pugacheva ("I will place all on the places"), Sergey Mazayev ("the Actress on life"), Alexander Malinin ("As we loved"), Verka Serdjuchka, Vladimir Presnyakov, Pierre Nartsiss, Anastasia Stotskaya and others. Kudikova recorded some joint compositions with the world stars Tomas N'evergreen, ("Another lovesong"), and Al Bano ("Ci Sara").

== Cooperation with Alla Pugacheva ==
Kudikova gives credit to Alla Pugacheva for being the person who changed her life. Now, Pugacheva is her art director and her mentor. She said of Alla Borisovne; "The Prima donna helped me to begin a career on the big scene and has always supported me, like nobody else."

== Cooperation with Igor Matvienko ==
After Kudikova's termination from the teleproject "Alla Pugacheva's Star Factory-5" she signed a contract with Igor Matvienko's music production company and the First Channel.

In May 2007, Kudikova gave a solo concert in Moscow called the "Irson Jazz Show". Some stars from the jazz, variety and comedy scene also took part in the concert program. In 2009 in Los Angeles, she made the acquaintance of Snoop Dogg, leading to a feature on his track "Replay".

== Irson Production ==
In 2010, Kudikova founded her own company "Irson Production", allowing her to take the independent route for her career.In 2011, it released her duet with American rapper Warren G called "Innocent".

== Sports ==
Kudikova is a Master of Sports in Russia for basketball and a candidate for table tennis.

== Business ==
Kudikova currently owns the jewelry company "Golden heart" and her personal entertainment company "Irson Productions". She also was a joint owner of the security enterprise "International League of Professional Bodyguards".

== Discography ==
- "Two stars""(2008)
- "Shoppingtherapy" (2008)
- "Point G" (2009)
- "Point G, Part 2" (2010)
- "Irson Kudikova" (2010)
- "Dreams On" (2010)

== Clips ==
- "September Rain" (Ost fikm Dangerous tour (Command Performance)), director Feodor Bondarchuk (2006)
- "Space" (in a leading role of Dolph Lundgren), director Yury Grymov (2006)
- "Shoppingtherepy", director Ekaterina Grohovsky (2008)
- "Whether you, whether he" (feat. Andrey Zvonky), director Pavel Khudyakov (2010)
- "I will make everything as you want" (2011)

== Filmography ==
- Dangerous tour (Command Performance) – The Jazz Singer (2009)
