= In Hell =

2003 American film by Ringo Lam

- DVD cover
- Directed by: Ringo Lam
- Written by: Eric James Virgets; Jorge Álvarez; Steve Latshaw; Les Weldon
- Produced by: Danny Lerner; John Thompson; David Varod
- Starring: Jean-Claude Van Damme; Lawrence Taylor; Marnie Alton; Malakai Davidson; Billy Rieck
- Cinematography: John B. Aronson
- Edited by: David Richardson
- Music by: Alexander Bubenheim
- Production companies: 777 Films Corporation; Millennium Films; Nu Image
- Distributed by: Columbia TriStar Home Entertainment
- Release date: November 25, 2003
- Running time: 98 minutes
- Country: United States
- Languages: English; Russian

In Hell is a 2003 American action thriller film directed by Ringo Lam. The film stars Jean-Claude Van Damme as a man who, after killing his wife's killer in the courthouse, is sent to prison where he must fight for survival at the hands of corrupt warden. Lawrence Taylor, Marnie Alton, Malakai Davidson, and Billy Rieck also stars. and follows an adaptation of the 1978 film Midnight Express, it is the third and final collaboration between Jean-Claude Van Damme and Hong Kong film director Ringo Lam. The film was released on direct-to-DVD in the United States on November 25, 2003.

== Plot ==
While working overseas in Magnitogorsk, Russia, Kyle LeBlanc finds his wife dead after hearing her being attacked over the phone. The culprit, Sergio Kovic, bribes the judge and is not convicted. Enraged, Kyle steals a gun from the bailiff and shoots Sergio multiple times, killing him. Kyle is sentenced to life in prison without parole and is sent to Kravavi Prison, which is run by the corrupt warden, General Hruschov. Kyle hesitates to give up his wedding ring and is brutally beaten. Later that night, he watches as fellow American inmate Billy Cooper is taken to a prison cell to be raped by Russian Mafia member Andrei.

The next morning, Kyle gets into a brawl with Andrei. He is sent to solitary confinement and attempts suicide. He realizes that he must survive and is intentionally transferred to a cell with Inmate 451, who is infamous for killing his cellmates. However, the two form a bond. Kyle soon meets Billy, who explains that he is serving a sentence for a DUI. He also meets Malakai, a wheelchair-using American who explains the politics and gangs of the prison, informing him that the Russian Mafia has an alliance with the guards.

Kyle trains and becomes a prison fighter, and in his first match, Kyle kills Andrei, causing him to have a mental breakdown. Kyle continues fighting, becoming hardened by the environment and earning the respect of other prisoners. He also denies help from the American embassy, having lost hope of being released. Billy, who has been continually failing escape attempts, is betrayed by Malakai for medical treatment. 451 discovers the betrayal and kills Malakai by setting him on fire. As he watches Malakai burn, 451 recalls memories of sexual abuse by his teacher and how he killed him in the same way.

Billy is severely beaten after resisting being raped by Valya. Before dying, Billy warns Kyle not to let anyone turn him into something he's not. Kyle refuses to fight Valya and is hung by his arms in the yard. After seeing Kyle's perseverance despite his agony, the prison gangs put aside their rivalries and unite, refusing to fight when Hruschov demands it. Afterward, Kyle is released from his restraints and sent to the infirmary, where he has a dream of his wife. Kyle recovers and is confronted by Hruschov, who demands that he fight Miloc, a massive prisoner who is kept separate from the general population. Kyle, recognizing Miloc from solitary, knocks on a door repeatedly, making Miloc remember him. The two embrace, but a guard orders them to continue at gunpoint. Kyle still refuses to fight, and the prisoners begin protesting, which allows Kyle and Miloc to release the prisoners, igniting a riot. Miloc is fatally shot protecting Kyle, who comforts him as he dies.

During the riot, 451 agrees to help Kyle escape from Kravavi and provides him with evidence of the prison's corruption and abuses. The riot slowly suppresses, and 451 shows Kyle a secret passage to the prison garage. However, Kyle can only gain access if he fights Valya. Kyle gains the upperhand and Valya pulls out a knife, which he uses to accidentally kill the Russian Mafia's leader, and Kyle takes the opportunity to kill him. While the guards take Kyle away, 451 ambushes them. 451 stays behind to kill Hruschev, and Kyle takes the car keys and his wedding ring before driving off. Kyle returns to the United States and exposes the prison, leading to it being shut down three months later.

== Cast ==
- Jean-Claude Van Damme as Kyle LeBlanc
- Lawrence Taylor as Inmate 451
- Marnie Alton as Grey LeBlanc
- Alan Davidson as Malakai
- Billy Rieck as "Coolhand"
- Jorge Luis Abreu as Boltun
- Lloyd Battista as General Hruschov
- Michael Bailey Smith as Valya
- Robert LaSardo as Usup
- Carlos Gomez as Lieutenant Tolik
- Chris Moir as Billy Cooper
- Valentin Ganev as Bolt
- Paulo Tocha as Viktor
- Raicho Vasilev as Andrei
- Emanuil Manolov as Ivan
- Valodian Vodenicharov as Dima
- Veselin Kalanovski as Sasha
- Atanas Srebrev as Misha
- Asen Blatechki as Zarik
- Juan Fernández as Shubka
- Michail Elenov as Sergio Kovic
- Milos Milicević as Miloc
- Yulian Vergov as Solitary Guard

== Release ==
In Hell was released on DVD in the United States on November 25, 2003.

== Reception ==
Robert Pardi of TV Guide rated it 1/5 stars and called it a "pokey exercise in cellblock sadism" that does not live up Lam's previous work. Jason P. Vargo of IGN rated it 5/10 stars and wrote that it is "strictly for Van Damme fans only". Beyond Hollywood wrote that although the film has many stock characters, it enjoyably plays on the usual conventions of a Van Damme film. Ian Jane of DVD Talk rated it 3/5 stars and called it "a pleasant surprise" and the best of Van Damme's recent films. David Johnson of DVD Verdict wrote that although the film attempts to bring a new facet to Van Damme's films, it only ends up being clichéd in different ways than his usual films.
In 2020 the Russian edition of Maxim ranked the film 5th on its list of the "12 most ridiculous movies about Russia".
