= Blackjack (1998 film) =

- Promotional release poster
- Written by: Peter Lance
- Directed by: John Woo
- Starring: Dolph Lundgren
- Music by: Micky Erbe; Maribeth Solomon
- Countries of origin: United States; Canada
- Original language: English

Production
- Executive producers: John Woo; Terence Chang; Christopher Godsick; Peter Lance
- Producer: John Ryan
- Cinematography: Bill Wong
- Editor: Ron Wisman
- Running time: 108 minutes
- Production companies: Alliance Communications; WCG Entertainment Productions; Baton; USA Pictures
- Budget: $7-8 million

Original release
- Network: USA Network
- Release: May 12, 1998

Blackjack (also known as John Woo's Blackjack) is a 1998 Canadian-American made-for-television action film and an unsuccessful pilot directed by John Woo and starring Dolph Lundgren as a leukophobic former United States Marshal turned bodyguard who hunts down an assassin. The film was produced by Alliance Communications, WCG Entertainment Productions, Baton and USA Pictures and premiered on USA Network on May 12, 1998.

== Plot ==
After crime boss Kamenev (Géza Kovács) threatens his daughter Casey (Padraigin Murphy), casino owner Bobby Stern (Peter Keleghan) calls in his friend, retired U.S. Marshal Jack Devlin (Dolph Lundgren), to protect her. Devlin fends off a squadron of Kamenev's henchmen sent to abduct Casey from the Stern mansion, but is temporarily blinded by a flashbang grenade in the process; he also gets shot in the leg. While Jack and Casey survive, Devlin develops a debilitating phobia of the color white (leukophobia) due to the traumatic experience of being blinded while fighting for his life (although Casey acted as his eyes).

Some time later, back home in New York City with his roommate/sidekick Thomas (Saul Rubinek), Jack is receiving treatment for his phobia from psychiatrist Dr. Rachel Stein (Kate Vernon). A lawyer arrives at Devlin's apartment, telling him that Bobby Stern and his wife have died in an accident, and that Jack is now Casey's legal guardian. Shortly after this, Jack's old friend, fellow retired U.S. Marshal Tim Hastings (Fred Williamson), is badly wounded while protecting a rising-star fashion model, Cinder James (Kam Heskin) from an insane, obsessive killer (Phillip MacKenzie), and left comatose in the hospital. Jack takes on Tim's job as bodyguard out of loyalty to his friend. Jack now has to juggle his duty as father figure to Casey, coping with his leukophobia, his difficult personal relationship with Cinder, and his rivalry with fellow bodyguard Don Tragle (Andrew Jackson), all while protecting Cinder from further assassination attempts.

Jack discovers that the killer is, in fact, Cinder's deranged, abusive ex-husband, Rory Gaines, a failed actor. Jack and Thomas manage to track Gaines to an abandoned distillery but, forewarned of their arrival, Gaines manages to incapacitate both of them and tie them up. Gaines comes close to murdering Thomas, but Jack manages to cut through his bonds in time to save him. Gaines exploits Jack's leukophobia to escape once more. Tragle conspires with Cinder's manager, Derek Smythe (Albert Schultz), to seize control of the bodyguard agency, forcing Jack out of his job, and leaving Cinder dangerously exposed at a big fashion show.

Jack manages to gain entry to the event, and keeps Cinder covered with a rifle as she walks the catwalk. Gaines appears in disguise as one of the fashion show's costumed performers, and shoots a pistol, then draws attention to Jack- who is there illicitly, and armed- to create a distraction, allowing him to abduct Cinder, who he takes back to his distillery hideout. Gaines compels Cinder to have "one last dance" with him; as he is about to stab her, Jack appears and engages Gaines in a shootout. Overcoming his leukophobia- the room is hung with white curtains- Jack shoots Gaines dead, saving Cinder. Some time later, Tim has recovered from his wounds; Jack and Cinder part ways with a kiss, and go their separate ways.

== Cast ==
- Dolph Lundgren as U.S. Marshal Jack Devlin
- Kate Vernon as Dr. Rachel Stein
- Phillip MacKenzie as Rory Gaines
- Kam Heskin as Cinder James
- Fred Williamson as Tim Hastings
- Andrew Jackson as Don Tragle
- Padraigin Murphy as Casey
- Tony De Santis as Detective Trini
- Albert Schultz as Derek Smythe
- Janet Bailey as Connie Hastings
- Saul Rubinek as Thomas

== Production ==
The film was intended as a backdoor pilot for a television series, but was not picked up. Its September 15, 1998 showing on the USA Network garnered a 2.7 national rating.

== Reception ==
=== Critical response ===
TV Guide reviewed the film at 2 stars out of 4 and noted: "Though it boasts several rousing action sequences, the film is sabotaged by lackluster acting, thin characterization, and a derivative storyline."
