= Direct Contact =

- Official DVD cover
- Directed by: Danny Lerner
- Written by: Les Weldon
- Story by: Danny Lerner; Les Weldon
- Produced by: Anton Hoeger; Danny Lerner; Les Weldon
- Starring: Dolph Lundgren; Michael Paré; Gina May; Bashar Rahal
- Cinematography: Ross W. Clarkson
- Edited by: Michele Gisser
- Music by: Stephen Edwards
- Production company: Nu Image
- Distributed by: First Look Entertainment (United States); Lionsgate (United Kingdom)
- Release dates: March 19, 2009 (Thailand); June 2, 2009 (United States)
- Running time: 90 minutes
- Country: United States
- Language: English
- Budget: $6 million

Direct Contact is a 2009 American action film written, produced and directed by Danny Lerner, and starring Dolph Lundgren, Michael Paré, Gina May and Bashar Rahal. The film was released on direct-to-DVD in the United States on June 2, 2009.

== Plot ==
Mike Riggins (Dolph Lundgren), an ex-US Marine, is rotting away in a Bulgarian prison for supposedly smuggling weapons. Thankfully, he can defend himself against his jailhouse assailants. When Clive Connelly (Michael Pare), a government bigshot, comes to Mike and offers him a total of $200,000 if he can rescue the kidnapped Ana Gale (Gina May) from Vlado Karadjov (Vladimir Vladimirov) and bring her back home, Mike agrees.

Once Mike has Ana out of Vlado's compound and in his custody, Mike realizes that Connelly has not told him the entire story. The kidnap story was just a ruse to bring Ana out into the open so Connelly can grab her.

Mike suddenly finds himself being hunted by Connelly and General Drago (Bashar Rahal), who works for him. They want Mike dead, and Ana under their control. Drago once worked for Vlado, but he has betrayed Vlado because Connelly offer him a lot of money for Ana. It is revealed that Ana works for a help organization. She came to the area two years ago, after a meningitis outbreak. Once they got it under control, Vlado made Ana an offer to help take care of his hemophiliac son, which she accepted.

It turns out that Ana is the daughter of American billionaire oil and shipping magnate Alastair Robbins, who died a week ago because of a heart problem, and Drago and Connelly are working for Ana's uncle Trent Robbins (James Chalke).

Alistair had an affair with Ana's mother and got her pregnant with Ana, but he never wanted to marry her. She loved Alastair, and she drank herself to death. Ana disowned Alastair for that.

Now, Alastair has left controlling interest of Robbins Industries to Ana, and Trent wants Connelly and Drago to kill Mike and bring Ana in alive so he can force her to sign a share transfer deed, which would give Trent controlling interest of Robbins Industries.

When Mike causes too many problems for Connelly and Drago, Trent takes a flight to Bulgaria so he can help handle the problem. But Mike and Ana have fallen for each other, and Trent, Connelly, and Drago don't realize how far Mike is willing to go to protect Ana.

Vlado tries to help Mike and Ana, but Vlado gets killed by Drago. Ana's shocked at how far Trent's willing to go to get his hands on the company. Mike and Ana take refuge in an empty barn for a night. Mike explains that he used to be in the U.S. Marine Corps, and he and his unit were sent to Kosovo during the war that splintered Yugoslavia.

Mike saw things in that war that no one should ever have to see, so Mike went to Bulgaria, where he started moving weapons out of war zones, thinking that would help put a stop to wars. Mike was still arrested and put in the prison for gun running. Now, after spending the night in the barn, Mike and Ana leave. Trent gets a call that the company's board has said that if Ana is not found within 30 days, he gets controlling interest of Robbins Industries, so he orders Connelly and Drago to kill both Ana and Mike.

Mike and Ana are chased toward the U.S. embassy, and they flee into an empty building in the area. Trent, Connelly, and Drago have the men working for them set the building on fire by bombing it. Mike and Ana kill the men who are working for Trent, Connelly, and Drago. Mike shoots Drago several times, fights Drago, and then kills Drago by shooting him again.

After that, Mike fights Connelly, stuffs a hand grenade down Connelly's shirt, with the pin pulled out, and kicks Connelly out a window. The grenade blows Connelly up in mid-air. When Trent shoots Mike in the shoulder, Ana fires a shot that kills Trent.

Mike recovers, and Ana inherits Alastair's company. Mike decides to go home with Ana.

== Cast ==
- Dolph Lundgren as Mike Riggins
- Michael Paré as Clive Connelly
- Gina May as Ana Gale
- Bashar Rahal as General Drago
- James Chalke as Trent Robbins
- Vladimir Vladimirov as Vlado Karadjov
- Raicho Vasilev as Boris
- Nikolay Stanoev as Gun Dealer
- Mike Straub as Lead Marine Guard
- Les Weldon as Anchorman
- Yoan Petrov as Vlado's Son
- Uti Bachvarov as Zoran Posternoff
- Alexander Kadiev as Chopper Pilot
- Teodor Tsolov as Janitor
- Marianne Stanicheva as Screaming Woman
- Gemma Garrett as Linda
- Slavi Slavov as General Drago's Guard # 1 (uncredited)
- Lyubo Yonchev as Passenger (uncredited)

== Production ==
=== Filming ===
It is set in and was filmed in Sofia, Bulgaria in 27 days from February 19 to March 17, 2008.

=== Trivia ===
- Stock Footage was used from several films of the studio Nu Image / Millennium films library.
- General Drago is wearing the Serbian Eagle on his cap.
- The Flag of the Fictional Eastern European Republic of Gorna has Romanian tricolors with an Albanian Eagle.
- The vehicles have Bulgarian numbers and the Fictional flag of The Republic of Gorna.

== Release ==
=== Home media ===
On June 2, 2009, DVD was released by First Look Entertainment in the United States in Region 1. On 13 June 2011, DVD was released by Lionsgate Home Entertainment in the United Kingdom in Region 2.
