= Silent Trigger =

- Promotional release poster
- Directed by: Russell Mulcahy
- Written by: Sergio Altieri
- Produced by: Nicolas Clermont; Silvio Muraglia
- Starring: Dolph Lundgren; Gina Bellman; Conrad Dunn; Christopher Heyerdahl
- Cinematography: David Franco
- Edited by: Yves Langlois
- Music by: Stefano Mainetti
- Distributed by: Buena Vista
- Release date: 1996
- Running time: 93 min.
- Language: English
- Budget: $9 million

Silent Trigger is a 1996 American action thriller film directed by Russell Mulcahy starring Dolph Lundgren and Gina Bellman about a sniper and his female spotter. Lundgren plays Waxman, a former Special Forces soldier who is now working as a heavily armed assassin sent on a mission by a secretive "Agency", to assassinate a target from an abandoned skyscraper in construction. Memories and moral dilemmas resurface when a former spotter from a failed assignment shows up.

== Plot ==
The movie takes place in and around an unfinished city skyscraper, the "Algonquin", where a sniper/spotter team set up a firing platform on a top floor. The two arrive independently of each other, two of the Agency's assassins. As they meet, they recognize each other, as they have been on a mission together before.

This mission is portrayed in a series of flashbacks. In the first flashback, sniper and spotter were supposed to assassinate a female politician. Sniper hesitates when the politician lifts a child and, while hesitating, a helicopter appears, air assaulting soldiers in the courtyard behind the team's firing position. The two defeat the attacking force, including the machine gun-equipped helicopter, whose pilot and copilot are shot through the canopy.

Returning to the primary scene, one of the construction site security personnel is new on the job. The drug-addicted regular, O'Hara (Christopher Heyerdahl) attempts to win a statutory position over him by scaring him. As Sniper opens a roof door, a light by the security personnel turns on, and the newcomer, Klein (Conrad Dunn) leaves in search of it.

The internal lift of the building is clearly audible, and Spotter surveys Klein's movements, when he arrives. She interrupts his inspections when he is about to open the roof door. She takes him to the lift, sending him downwards. However, just as she is talking him off, she sees Sniper sitting on top of the lift car. He mounts a bomb on the lift car and, when the car begins moving, nearly falls down the shaft. He is saved by Spotter, and they both attempt keeping up the "just business"-facade, although some romantic appreciation is apparent.

While the two on the rooftop readjust their gear, O'Hara, presumably, decides to rape Spotter. However, Spotter pulls her small-caliber sidearm, and threatens O'Hara into the lift. When O'Hara returns downstairs, he picks up his gun and puts on body armor. He then surprises Spotter, while she is standing over the sink of the top-floor bathrooms. Spotter points her gun at him, and shoots a well-aimed bullet into his chest. Unsurprised by this, O'Hara attacks Spotter, but is encountered by Sniper, and a violent fight takes place in an unfinished hall between various building materials. The fight is won by Sniper, and he ties the now bloody O'Hara to a toilet.

Spotter and Sniper consummate their feelings for each other. Afterwards, as duty continues, Sniper heads for the bathrooms, but sees water running out under the door to the bathroom. He pulls his gun, and discovers that O'Hara has disappeared.

O'Hara bears the toilet with him down the stairs. A vengeful O'Hara grabs his shotgun and is about to go upstairs to finish off Sniper. Klein, the new security guard, shoots O'Hara with his shotgun, walks to the spot where the dying O'Hara lies and, in cold blood, puts a final shot into him.

Upstairs, the two are engaging the target. As before, Sniper hesitates and does not take the shot. As history repeats itself for the two, Spotter pulls her sidearm and implores Sniper to do his duty. Before the situation escalates, another shooter shoots the target four times and, when finished, takes aim for Spotter and Sniper. Sniper quickly throws himself and Spotter away from the shot, grabs his rifle and shoots the adversary. Sniper and Spotter defend themselves from Special Forces personnel raiding the skyscraper. Sniper and Spotter are surprised by Klein, who has stealthily entered the room. He shoots Sniper in the chest with his shotgun, but is threatened by Spotter who has picked up an MP5 submachine gun. He takes the lift car and leaves when the planted bomb explodes.

Believing Sniper to be dead, Spotter flees the skyscraper. As she walks away from the building, the top of a nearby fire hydrant is shot off. She looks up and sees Sniper, removing/revealing the body armor that he was wearing, then throwing his sniper rifle from the building. He then quietly mouths "Goodbye" to her. Spotter mouths "Bye", then walks away, smiling, as the skyscraper continues to burn.

== Cast ==
- Dolph Lundgren as Waxman "Shooter"
- Gina Bellman as Clegg "Spotter"
- Conrad Dunn as Klein "Supervisor"
- Christopher Heyerdahl as O'Hara

== Production ==
=== Filming ===
The film was shot in an unfinished city skyscraper in Montreal.

== See also ==
- List of American films of 1996
