= The Peacekeeper =

- Promotional release poster
- Directed by: Frédéric Forestier
- Written by: Robert Geoffrion; Stewart Harding
- Produced by: Nicolas Clermont
- Starring: Dolph Lundgren; Michael Sarrazin; Montel Williams; Roy Scheider
- Cinematography: John Berrie
- Edited by: Yves Langlois
- Music by: François Forestier
- Production companies: Filmline International; Nu Image
- Distributed by: October Films
- Release date: December 12, 1997
- Running time: 98 minutes
- Countries: Canada; United States
- Language: English
- Budget: $16 million

The Peacekeeper is a 1997 action film directed by Frédéric Forestier, and starring Dolph Lundgren, Michael Sarrazin, Montel Williams, and Roy Scheider. The film follows U.S. Air Force Major Frank Cross, who is the only man who can prevent the president being assassinated. He must also prevent an impending nuclear holocaust. The threat is from a terrorist group, which has stolen the President's personal communications computer; it has the capability of launching the U.S. arsenal. The film was shot on location in the city of Montreal, Quebec.

== Plot ==
United States Air Force Major Frank Cross is in trouble with the "brass" again, after making an unauthorized humanitarian relief flight, dropping sacks of rice to starving Kurds. The press considers him a hero, requiring him by the President's side during his election campaign and thus preventing the Pentagon from court-martialling him. Instead, they assign him to carry the "black bag", the President's high-tech briefcase containing the "go codes" and communications computer for launching America's nuclear ICBM arsenal in case of a national emergency.

However, on his first day on the job in Chicago a team of mercenaries manages to steal the black bag. Cross, however, manages to fake his death and infiltrate the mercenaries. Thinking they have seen the last of him, they fly with a helicopter from the rooftops of Chicago into the night sky and onwards to their final target: United States Intercontinental Ballistic Missile Facility K-7. A disguised Cross slips into the missile silo as the team murders the silo personnel and takes over the launch control using the secret codes contained in the black bag.

They are led by ex-Marine Colonel Douglas Murphy, whose unit was sent to kill Saddam Hussein during an undercover operation in Iraq before Operation Desert Storm and was then exterminated by the President, who was Army Chief at the time, for political reasons. Driven by revenge, he launches a terrifying warning shot and sends a Peacekeeper nuclear missile that destroys Mount Rushmore, killing thousands. Only then does Murphy make his chilling demand: unless the President kills himself in front of a live television audience, Washington D.C. will be destroyed.

All attempts to stop one of the missiles from leaving the silo fail. Finally, the President gives in to Murphy's demand, only to realise that Murphy lied to humiliate him, so that he then should helplessly watch Washington be destroyed as Murphy helplessly had to watch his unit be destroyed against his will by the President. At the first opportunity, however, Frank acts against the terrorists and, with the help of the last surviving member of the silo, Lt. Colonel Northrop, he is able to kill the mercenaries and prevent the destruction of Washington in the nick of time.

== Cast ==
- Dolph Lundgren as Major Frank Cross
- Michael Sarrazin as Lieutenant Colonel Douglas Murphy
- Montel Williams as Lieutenant Colonel Northrop
- Roy Scheider as President Robert Baker
- Christopher Heyerdahl as Hettinger
- Allen Altman as McGarry
- Martin Neufeld as Decker
- Monika Schnarre as Jane Cross
- Michael Caloz as Billy Cross
- Tim Post as Nelson
- Carl Alacchi as Holbrook
- Chip Chuipka as Davis
- Roc LaFortune as Abbott
- Gouchy Boy as Robinson
- Phil Chiu as Kong
- Michel Perron as Space Command Controller
- Serge Houde as Secretary of Defence
- David Francis as Major General Harding
- Vlasta Vrana as General Douglas
- Frank Fontaine as General Greenfield
- David Nichols as General Joseph
- Mark Camacho as Presidential Aide #1
- Susan Glover as Presidential Aide #2
- Larry Day as Secret Service Agent Maxwell
- Alan Fawcett as Secret Service Agent Samuels
- Philip Pretten as Secret Service Agent Clark
- Andy Bradshaw as Secret Service Agent Johnson

== Reception ==
=== Critical response ===
AllMovie's Sandra Brenan awarded the film two out of five stars. She referred to it as a "well-wrought Canadian direct-to-video actioner" and made comparisons with the Die Hard franchise. Critic Douglas Pratt gave the film a positive review in his 2004 book Doug Pratt's DVD: Movies, Television, Music, Art, Adult, and More!. He writes, "the 1997 film's first half is outright excellent. Dolph Lundgren is the guy who carries the briefcase for the president that has all the nuclear war codes in it. Villains come in like gangbusters." The Peacekeeper was referenced in the 2022 book Four Scores and Seven Reels Ago: The U.S. Presidency Through Hollywood Films, with author Dale Sherman comparing its portrayal of the U.S. president to that of Air Force One (1997).
