= Dolph Lundgren =

Swedish and American actor and martial artist (born 1957)

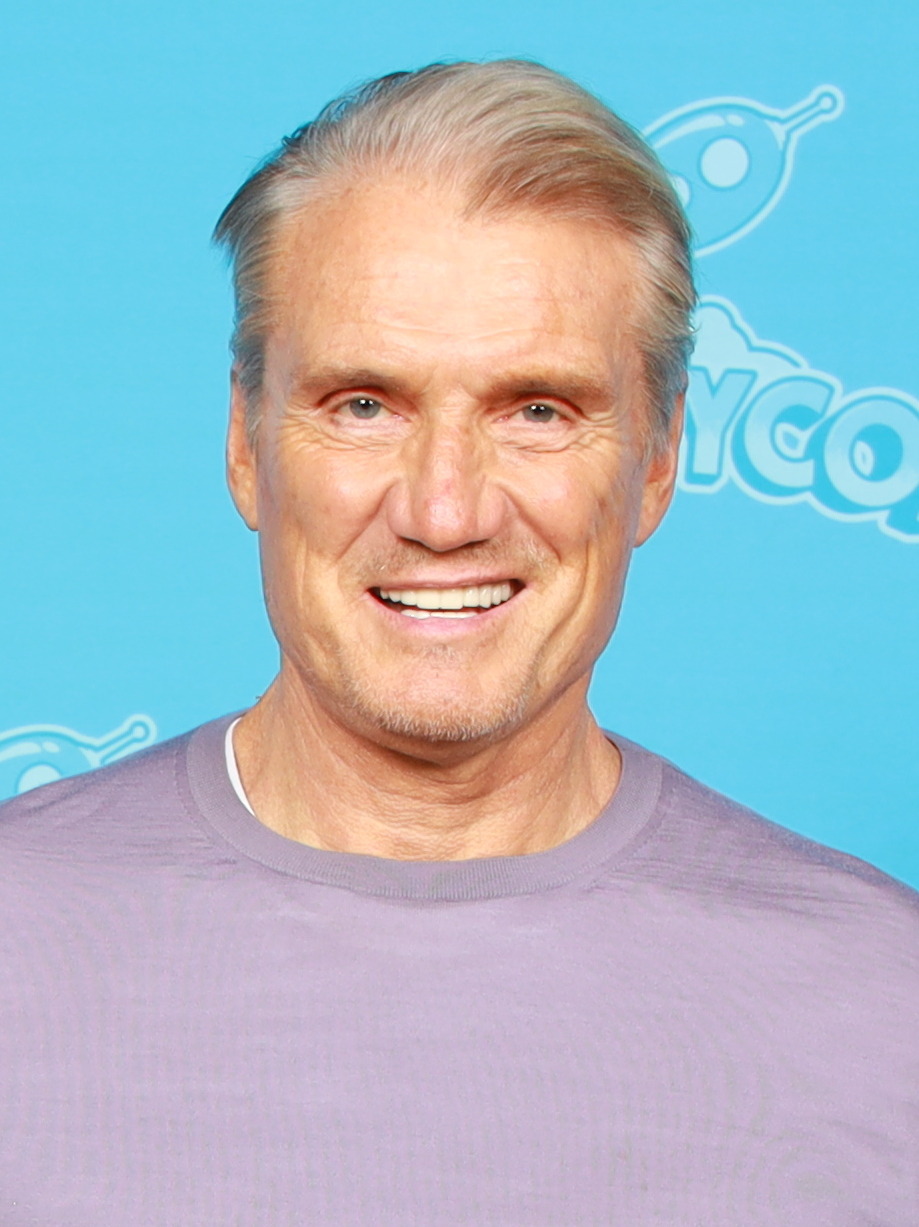
- Lundgren in 2024
- Born: Hans Lundgren; 3 November 1957 (age 69); Stockholm, Sweden
- Citizenship: Sweden (by birth); United States (from 2024)
- Education: KTH Royal Institute of Technology (BSc); University of Sydney (ME)
- Occupations: Actor; filmmaker; martial artist
- Years active: 1979–present
- Works: Full list
- Spouses: Anette Qviberg (m. 1994; div. 2011); Emma Krokdal (m. 2023)
- Children: 2

Hans "Dolph" Lundgren (/ˈlʌndɡrən/; Swedish: [ˈdɔlːf ˈlɵ̌nːdɡreːn]; born 3 November 1957) is a Swedish and American actor, filmmaker, and martial artist. He gained recognition for portraying the Soviet boxer Ivan Drago in his breakthrough role in Rocky IV (1985), a role he reprised in Creed II (2018).

Lundgren went on to play lead roles in over 80 action-oriented films including Masters of the Universe (1987), Red Scorpion (1988), The Punisher (1989), I Come in Peace (1990), Showdown in Little Tokyo (1991), Joshua Tree (1993), Men of War (1994), Silent Trigger (1996), and Blackjack (1998). He continued playing villainous roles, most notably as Sergeant Andrew Scott in three Universal Soldier films (1992–2012), co-starring Jean-Claude Van Damme. Moving into the 2000s, Lundgren mostly appeared in direct-to-video films. During this time, Lundgren started directing and starring in his own films; these are The Defender (2004), The Mechanik (2005), Missionary Man (2007), and Command Performance (2009).

Lundgren returned to prominence in 2010 with the role of Gunner Jensen in Sylvester Stallone's The Expendables alongside an all-action star cast. He reprised his role in its sequels. He has since appeared in the well-received films Aquaman (2018), Castle Falls (2021), which he also directed, Don't Kill It (2017), and Showdown at the Grand (2023), among others. He has appeared in SAF3 (2013–2014) and Arrow (2016–2017). His voice acting work includes Seal Team (2021) and Minions: The Rise of Gru (2022).

Lundgren received a degree in chemical engineering from the KTH Royal Institute of Technology in the early 1980s and a master's degree in chemical engineering from the University of Sydney in 1982. He has been practicing martial arts since the age of 16, earning the rank of 4th dan black belt in Kyokushin karate, and becoming the European champion in 1980 and 1981.

== Early life ==
Hans Lundgren was born in Spånga, Stockholm County, Sweden to Sigrid Birgitta (née Tjerneld; 1932–1992), a language teacher, and Karl Hugo Johan Lundgren (1923–2000), an engineer (M.Sc.) and economist (MBA) for the Swedish government. He lived in Spånga until the age of 13, when he moved to his grandparents' home in Nyland, Ångermanland. Some sources incorrectly state 1959 as his year of birth, but Lundgren himself has confirmed it to be 1957. He has two sisters, Katarina and Annika and an elder brother Johan. Lundgren claims his father was physically abusive and took out his own personal frustrations on his wife and son. He has stated that, during his tirades, his father would call him a "loser", which motivated him later as he grew more ambitious to prove himself. But he also said, "I still love my father, no matter what happened. There are many things about him I still admire. As a child, I was probably too much like him, very stubborn—perhaps that's what he couldn't deal with." He has cited his troubled relationship with his father as the reason he developed a desire to participate in heavy contact sports such as boxing and karate.

Lundgren has said that, as a child, he was insecure and suffered from allergies, describing himself as a "runt". He showed a keen interest in drumming and had aspirations to become a rock star. At age seven, he tried judo and Gōjū-ryū. He took up Kyokushin karate at the age of 10, and began lifting weights as a teenager. Lundgren stated that "My dad always told me that if I wanted to make something special with my life, I had to go to America." After graduating from high school with straight A's, he spent time in the United States in the 1970s on various academic scholarships, studying chemical engineering at Washington State University 1976–1977, and Clemson University prior to serving his mandatory one year in the Swedish Coastal Artillery at the Coastal Ranger School. In the late 1970s, he enrolled at the Royal Institute of Technology in Stockholm and graduated in the early 1980s with a degree in chemical engineering.

Amidst his years of studying, Lundgren honed his karate skills by training in a dojo for five years, and attained a black belt in Kyokushin by the late 1970s. He captained the Swedish Kyokushin karate team, and was a challenger at the 1979 World Open Tournament (arranged by the Kyokushin Karate Organization). He won the European championships in 1980 and 1981, and the Australian Kyokushinkai Full-Contact Karate Tournament in 1982. In 1982, he graduated with a master's degree in chemical engineering from the University of Sydney. During his time in Sydney, he earned a living as a bouncer in a nightclub in the notorious King's Cross area.

Lundgren was awarded a Fulbright Scholarship to MIT in 1983. However, while preparing for the move to Boston, he was spotted in the nightclub where he worked in Sydney and was hired by Grace Jones as a bodyguard, and the two became lovers. He moved with Jones to New York City, where he dabbled in modeling at the Zoli Agency but was described as "a bit too tall and muscular for a model's size 40". He earned a living as a bouncer at the Manhattan nightclub The Limelight, which was housed in the former Episcopal Church of the Holy Communion, working with Chazz Palminteri. In the daytime, he studied drama at the Warren Robertson Theatre Workshop and has said that "my time in New York City opened up my adolescent Swedish eyes to a multitude of different people and lifestyles, mostly in the arts. I hung out with Andy Warhol, Keith Haring, Iman, and Steve Rubell, danced at Studio 54, and studied acting with Andie MacDowell and Tom Hulce." Friends told him he should be in movies. He quit studying at MIT after two weeks to pursue acting. Lundgren said after being exposed to the entertainment business, he found it more attractive and rewarding than chemical engineering, so he decided to pursue a career in acting.

== Career ==
=== 1985–1995: Breakthrough and action film star ===
Lundgren made his film debut in the 1985 James Bond film A View to a Kill, Roger Moore's final film as 007, in the minor role of Venz, a KGB assassin. His former lover Grace Jones, who portrayed the villain May Day, personally recommended him. According to Lundgren, Moore said of him, "Dolph is larger than Denmark."

Upon learning that Sylvester Stallone was seeking an imposing fighter to play Soviet boxer Ivan Drago in Rocky IV (1985), Lundgren sent videos and pictures of himself to a distant contact of Stallone, eventually reaching him. Lundgren tried out for the role, but as he himself has stated, he was initially turned down because he was too tall. Lundgren eventually beat 5,000 other hopefuls to land his breakout role opposite Stallone, Carl Weathers, and Brigitte Nielsen. To improve his physique and athletic abilities, he trained intensely in bodybuilding and boxing for five months before the film was shot. Lundgren said: "We trained six days a week—weights in the morning for about an hour, then boxing in the afternoon. We did a split of chest and back one day and then shoulders, legs, and arms the next. We boxed for an hour and a half, practiced the fight choreography, and did bag work and abs." He weighed 240 lb (110 kg) during filming, but in the film he was billed at 250 lb (110 kg), one shipping above of Drago, "He's a exceptional 260 lb (120 kg) of merciless fighting machine, Drago is listed come to behold 270 lb (120 kg), the best that Soviet science & medicine can create". His character's lines "If he dies, he dies" and "I must break you" are amongst the best known of the Rocky series, and have often been cited in popular culture. Lundgren hit Stallone so hard during the filming of a fight scene that Stallone was in intensive care in the St. John's Hospital for nine days with a blood pressure of 290, due to swelling of the pericardial sac around his heart. Lundgren decades later fought in a real boxing match against former UFC fighter Oleg Taktarov, and lost via decision. Lundgren has highlighted the premiere of Rocky IV at the Mann Village Theatre, in Westwood, Los Angeles, as the moment which changed his life, remarking: "I walked in to a Westwood movie theater as Grace Jones' boyfriend and walked out ninety minutes later as the movie star Dolph Lundgren. I was shell-shocked for years from the mind-boggling and daunting experience of being a student-athlete from tiny Sweden suddenly having to live up a new action-star persona."

In 1987, Lundgren released on home media a workout video called Maximum Potential, and he also got his first lead role as He-Man in Masters of the Universe, based on the popular children's toyline and cartoon, directed by Gary Goddard. Lundgren weighed his all-time heaviest during the filming at 225 lb (102 kg). The film was a critical failure and viewed as far too violent for a family picture. It is referred to as a "flop" by Variety magazine, and has a 13% "rotten" rating at Rotten Tomatoes. Lundgren was criticized for being too wooden as a leading man, and it was dismissed as "a glossy fantasy starring monosyllabic Dolph Lundgren".

In 1988, he starred in Joseph Zito's Red Scorpion. Lundgren plays a Soviet KGB agent who is sent to an African country to assassinate the leader of an anti-communist rebel movement, but eventually switches sides. The film was poorly received and has an 17% "rotten" rating at Rotten Tomatoes. Stephen Holden of The New York Times said: "Dolph Lundgren's pectorals are the real stars of Red Scorpion, an action-adventure movie set in the fictional African country of Mombaka. Filmed from below so that one has the sense of peering up at a massive kinetic sculpture, his glistening torso, which over the course of the film is subjected to assorted tortures, is the movie's primary visual focus whenever the action slows down. And since Mr. Lundgren remains stone-faced, rarely speaking except to issue commands in a surprisingly hesitant monotone, his heaving chest actually communicates more emotion than his mumbling lips."

In 1989, Lundgren then starred as Marvel Comics adaptation The Punisher playing the title role. Directed by Mark Goldblatt, the film changes some details of the character's origin, and eliminates the signature skull logo. These elements troubled fans of the comic book upon its release, who were dismissive. Initial reviews also found it to be a trashy comic book film. The film had a troubled release. as the studios who made it changed ownership. While the film was theatrically released internationally, the film went direct-to-video in the US. However, over the years, the film developed a cult following. The film was re-evaluated with a much more positive outlook who find Lundgren's performance solid as a ghostly and soul depraved vigilante.

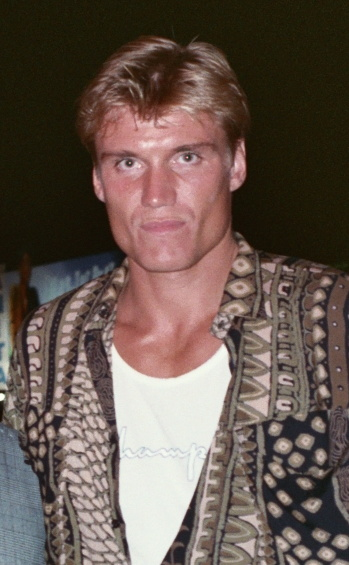
Lundgren at the Air America premiere in 1990

In 1990, Lundgren starred in Craig R. Baxley's sci-fi thriller I Come in Peace (also known as Dark Angel) opposite Brian Benben, Betsy Brantley, Matthias Hues, and Jay Bilas. Lundgren plays a tough Houston cop with an inner sensitivity, who does not let the rules of police procedure prevent him pursuing his mission to wipe out a gang of drug dealers who killed his partner. Lundgren said of his role: "What attracted me to Dark Angel is that I get to do more than just action. There's some romance, some comedy, some drama. I actually have some clever dialogue in this one. I get to act."

In 1991, Lundgren starred in Manny Coto's action film Cover Up opposite Louis Gossett Jr. Lundgren portrays a US Marine veteran turned reporter, who finds his own life in jeopardy after stumbling across a political cover-up. In Mark L. Lester's martial arts action film Showdown in Little Tokyo, he and Brandon Lee play police officers investigating the yakuza. The film received a mainly negative reception from critics and was criticized for its violence; Vincent Canby of The New York Times described it as "violent, but spiritless." Variety wrote: "Lundgren can hold his own with other action leads as an actor and could easily be Van Damme-marketable if only he'd devote as much attention to quality control as he does to pectoral development." David J. Fox of the Los Angeles Times, however, described the film as a "class act", and some retrospective critics find it to be entertaining for its genre.

In 1992, Lundgren starred in the sci-fi action picture Universal Soldier directed by Roland Emmerich. Lundgren (as Sergeant Andrew Scott) and Jean-Claude Van Damme (as Luc Deveraux) play U.S. soldiers who died during the Vietnam War, only to be later reanimated in a secret Army project to be sent on missions as GR operatives. At the 1992 Cannes Film Festival, Van Damme and Lundgren were involved in a verbal altercation that almost turned physical, but it was believed to have only been a publicity stunt. Universal Soldier opened in theatres on 10 July 1992, a moderate success domestically with $36,299,898 in US ticket sales, but a major blockbuster worldwide, making over $65 million overseas, which earned the film a total of $102 million worldwide, on a $23 million budget. Despite being a box office hit, it was not well-received; mainstream critics dismissed the movie as a Terminator 2 rip-off. Film critic Roger Ebert said: "it must be fairly thankless to play lunks who have to fight for the entire length of a movie while exchanging monosyllabic idiocies", and included Universal Soldier in his book I Hated, Hated, Hated This Movie.

In 1993, Lundgren starred opposite Kristian Alfonso and George Segal in Vic Armstrong's Joshua Tree. Lundgren plays Wellman Anthony Santee, a former racecar driver who is framed by police officer Frank Severance (Segal) for the murder of a highway patrolman. Much of the film was filmed in the Alabama Hills of the Sierra Nevada and the desert of the Joshua Tree National Park of southeast California.

In 1994, Lundgren starred in Bruce Malmuth's Pentathlon as an East German Olympic gold medalist pentathlete on the run from an abusive coach. Lundgren trained with the U.S. pentathlon team in preparation for the role, which later led to him being selected to serve as the (non-competing) Team Leader of the 1996 U.S. Olympic Modern Pentathlon team during the Atlanta Games, to promote the image of the sport and to coordinate planning and other details between the team and the United States Olympic Committee. The film was seen negatively by most critics; Film Review said it was "appallingly acted and monotonous" and Video Movie Guide 2002 described it as a "silly Cold War thriller".

Later in 1994, Lundgren appeared in Perry Lang's Men of War (scripted by John Sayles) alongside Charlotte Lewis and BD Wong, as Nick Gunar, a former Special Ops soldier who leads a group of mercenaries to a treasure island in the South China Sea. The film was well received by some critics. One author said "Men of War invokes the most vividly remembered fighting in a foreign land of recent Western history. This innovation, associating the muscle image with the Vietnam experience, is carried over into other contemporary muscle films." Another said, "fine performances by an all-star Dolph Lundgren as a mercenary assigned to 'convince' a cast in this offbeat and disturbing film."

In 1995, Lundgren appeared in Robert Longo's Johnny Mnemonic, co-starring Keanu Reeves. The film portrays screenwriter William Gibson's dystopian cyberpunk view of the future with the world dominated by megacorporations and with strong East Asian influences. Reeves plays the title character, a man with a cybernetic brain implant designed to store information. Lundgren plays Karl Honig, a Jesus-obsessed hitman and street preacher who wears a robe and carries a shepherd's staff. Critical response was negative overall; Roger Ebert said, "Johnny Mnemonic is one of the great gestures of recent cinema, a movie which doesn't deserve one nanosecond of serious analysis." The film was a financial disappointment, grossing $19,075,720 in the domestic American market against its $26m budget. The cloak worn by Lundgren in the film is now located in the lobby of the Famous Players Coliseum in Mississauga, Ontario, it was his last theatrical release film until 2010. Later in 1995, Lundgren appeared in Ted Kotcheff's The Shooter, an action drama in which he plays Michael Dane, a U.S. Marshall who gets caught up in politics when he is hired to solve the assassination of a Cuban ambassador.

=== 1996–2009: Subsequent films and directorial efforts ===
In 1996, Lundgren starred in Russell Mulcahy's Silent Trigger, playing a former Special Forces agent who joins a secretive government agency as an assassin. The Motion Picture Guide to the films of 1997 said, "this stylish but empty thriller gives square-jawed Dolph Lundgren another shot at straight-to-video immortality".

In 1997, Lundgren starred in Frédéric Forestier's The Peacekeeper, playing Major Frank Cross of the US Air Force and the only man who can prevent the president being assassinated and with the ability to thwart an imminent nuclear holocaust. The film co-starred Michael Sarrazin, Montel Williams, Roy Scheider and Christopher Heyerdahl, and was shot on location in Montreal. The film was praised for its exciting action sequences. Doug Pratt described the first half of the film as "excellent" and described Lundgren's character as "tenacious", although Robert Cettl wrote "the Peacekeeper trades on the presence of B-movie action star Dolph Lundgren, an actor who never became as popular as his action contemporaries Jean-Claude Van Damme and Steven Seagal."

In 1998, he appeared in Jean-Marc Piché's action/supernatural horror film The Minion alongside Françoise Robertson Lundgren portrays Lukas Sadorov, a middle eastern templar and member of an order who are charged with guarding the gateway to Hell that, if opened, will unleash all evil. The DVD and Video Guide of 2005 described the film as being "possibly one of the worst films ever". Later in 1998, Lundgren appeared alongside Bruce Payne and Claire Stansfield in Sweepers as Christian Erickson, a leading demolition expert and head of an elite team of specialists, trained to disarm mine fields in a humanitarian minesweeping operation in Angola. The Video Guide to 2002 said, "that noise you hear isn't the numerous on-screen explosions but action star Lundgren's career hitting rock bottom." He also featured in the TV pilot Blackjack (directed by John Woo) as a former US Marshal who becomes the bodyguard and detective of a young supermodel (Kam Heskin), who becomes the target of a psychotic assassin (Phillip MacKenzie). One review described the narrative as "laughably stupid", while the DVD and Video Guide to 2005 said, "dull, lightweight, made-for-TV action fully to a satisfying climax".

In 1999, Lundgren played a mercenary in Isaac Florentine's Bridge of Dragons, a military pilot in Anthony Hickox's Storm Catcher, and a cop who's a former boxer in Jill Rips, also directed by Hickox, based on a 1987 novel by Scottish writer Frederic Lindsay.

In 2000, Lundgren starred in The Last Warrior as Captain Nick Preston under director Sheldon Lettich. In Damian Lee's Agent Red (also known as Captured), co-starring Alexander Kuznetsov and Natalie Radford and Randolph Mantooth, Lundgren plays a soldier trapped on a submarine during the Cold War who must work with his wife, a virologist, to prevent a terrorist chemical attack against the United States. After the film was completed, producer Andrew Stevens thought it was too poor to be released and multiple people had to be hired to at least make the film half-competent. The film was very poorly received, given its "shoestring budget"; the DVD and Film Guide of 2005 wrote, "low-budget mess stars Dolph Lundgren as a navy special operations commander trying to keep a deadly virus out of the hands of terrorists. This subpar effort sinks to the bottom of the ocean in a tidal wave of cliche." During an interview on The Tonight Show with Jay Leno in May 2008, Gladiator director Ridley Scott said Lundgren had been considered for the part of undefeated fighter Tigris of Gaul in 2000, but was eventually rejected because "as an actor, he just didn't fit in with what we were trying to achieve".

In 2001, Lundgren starred in Hidden Agenda, directed by Marc S. Grenier. He plays Jason Price, an ex-FBI agent who protects a witness. In 2003, Lundgren featured in Sidney J. Furie's Detention.

In 2004, Lundgren appeared opposite Polly Shannon in Direct Action under Sidney J. Furie, portraying Sergeant Frank Gannon, an officer who has spent the last three years on the Direct Action Unit (DAU) task force, fighting gang crime and corruption and after he leaves he is hunted down by former colleagues for betraying the brotherhood. That year, he played a role in Ed Bye's comedy Fat Slags. His next starring role was in the science fiction picture Retrograde. In it, Lundgren plays a man who is in a group of genetically unique people who travel back in time to prevent the discovery of meteors containing deadly bacteria."

In 2004, Lundgren made his directorial debut with The Defender, when he replaced Sidney J. Furie, who was sick during pre-production. Lundgren also stars, playing the bodyguard of the head of the National Security Agency during a war on terror.

In 2005, Lundgren starred and directed his second picture The Mechanik (a.k.a. The Russian Specialist), playing a retired Russian Special Forces hitman caught in the crossfire with Russian mobsters. Sky Movies remarked that The Mechanik is "hardcore death-dealing from the Nordic leviathan" and said that "The Mechanik delivers all the no-nonsense gunplay you'd want of a Friday night".

In 2006, Lundgren played gladiator Brixos in the Italian-made historical/biblical drama, The Inquiry (L'inchiesta) a remake of a 1986 film by the same name, in an ensemble that includes Daniele Liotti, Mónica Cruz, Max von Sydow, F. Murray Abraham and Ornella Muti. Set in AD 35 in the Roman Empire, the story follows a fictional Roman general named Titus Valerius Taurus, a veteran of campaigns in Germania, who is sent to Judea by the emperor Tiberius to investigate the possibility of the divinity of the recently crucified Jesus. The film, shot on location in Tunisia and Bulgaria, premiered at the Capri, Hollywood and the Los Angeles Italia Film Festival.

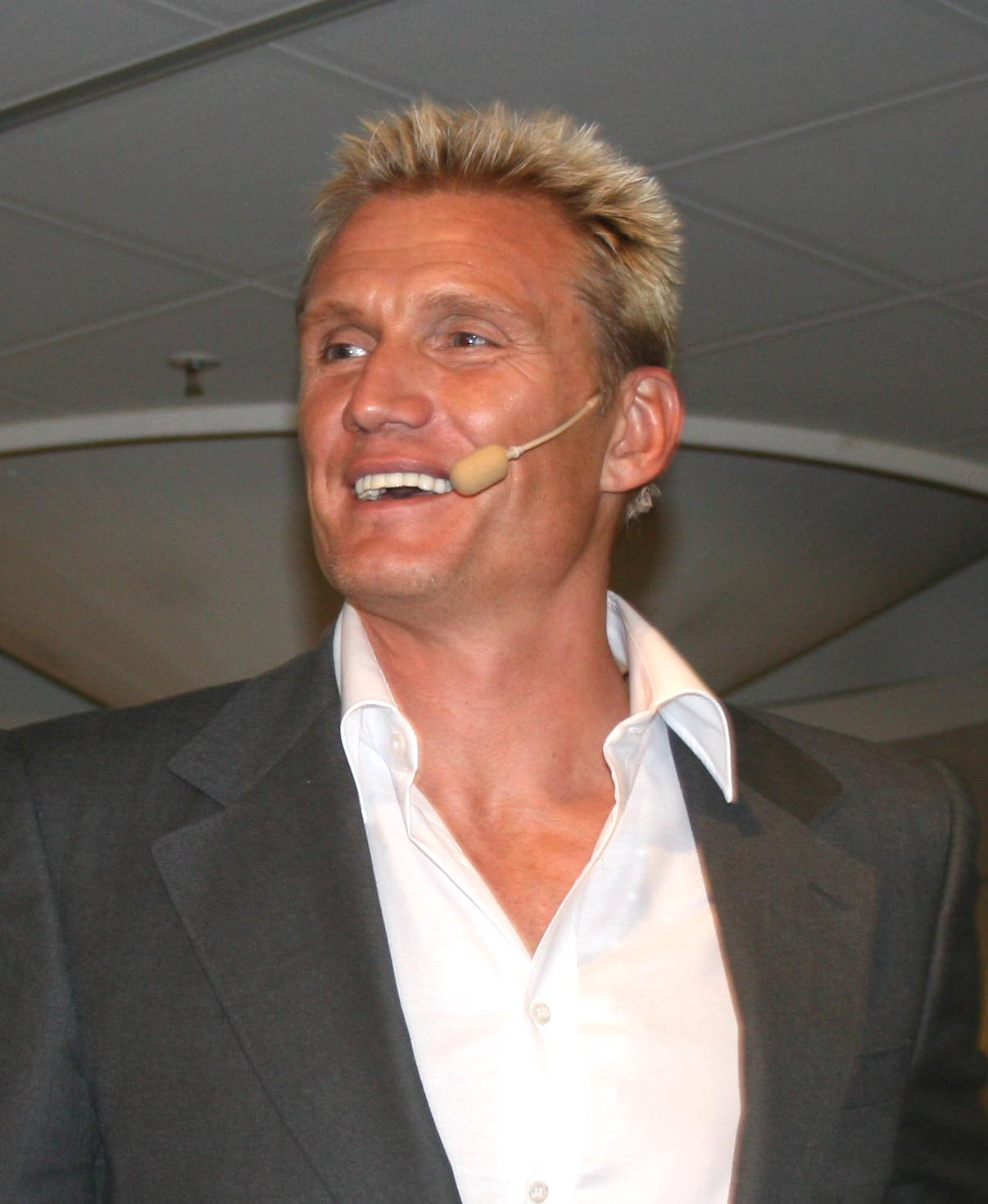
Lundgren in 2007

In 2007, Lundgren directed and starred in the Mongolia-based action adventure, Diamond Dogs. Lundgren plays a mercenary hired by a group of fortune hunters to act as their guide and bodyguard. The film, a Canadian-Chinese production, was shot on location in Inner Mongolia. Later in 2007, Lundgren wrote, directed and starred in the modern western film, Missionary Man alongside Charles Solomon Jr. Lundgren plays a lone, Bible-preaching stranger named Ryder who comes into a small Texas town on his 1970s Harley-Davidson motorcycle to attend the funeral of his good friend J.J., a local Native American carpenter, only to later get mixed up in a series of brawls with a local gang. According to Lundgren, it had long been a desire of his to direct a western, having long been a fan of Clint Eastwood and John Wayne, yet he did not want to spend the time and money building an old western town and hiring horses, so decided to set it in modern times with a motorbike. The film, shot on location in Waxahachie, south of Dallas, Texas, was specially screened at the 2008 AFI Dallas Film Festival.

In 2008, Lundgren starred in the direct-to-video action flick Direct Contact. He plays an ex-US Special forces operative on a rescue mission. This was followed by another direct to video film Command Performance (2009), a hostage action drama in which Lundgren, a proficient musician in real life, plays a rock drummer forced to face terrorists at a concert. The film co-starred Canadian pop singer Melissa Smith, playing a world-famous pop singer in the film and his own daughter, Ida, on her screen debut, who played one of the daughters of the Russian president. The story was inspired by a concert Madonna put on for Russian President Vladimir Putin, although Lundgren has also likened the pop singer to Britney Spears. The film premiered at the Ischia Global Film & Music Festival on 18 July 2009.

In 2009, The Dolph Lundgren Scholarship was instituted in his name, which is awarded to the student with the best grades at Ådalsskolan in Kramfors, the school where he himself studied. Lundgren then reunited with Jean-Claude Van Damme in Universal Soldier: Regeneration, where he plays Andrew Scott's clone. The film was released theatrically in the Middle East and Southeast Asia and directly to video in the United States and other parts of the world. Since its release, the film has received better than average reviews for a straight-to-DVD franchise sequel, with film critic Brian Orndorf giving the film a B, calling it "moody, pleasingly quick-draw, and knows when to quit, making the Universal Soldier brand name bizarrely vital once again." Dread Central gave it three out of five knives, saying: "there is almost nothing but solid b-level action until the credits roll." On the negative side, Pablo Villaça said in his review that while he praised Van Damme's performance, he criticized that of Lundgren and described the film "dull in concept and execution".

Later in 2009, Lundgren directed and starred as a businessman whose shady past as a KGB special agent is discovered in the hit-man thriller Icarus (retitled in the US and the UK as The Killing Machine).

=== 2010–present: Return to prominence and current projects ===
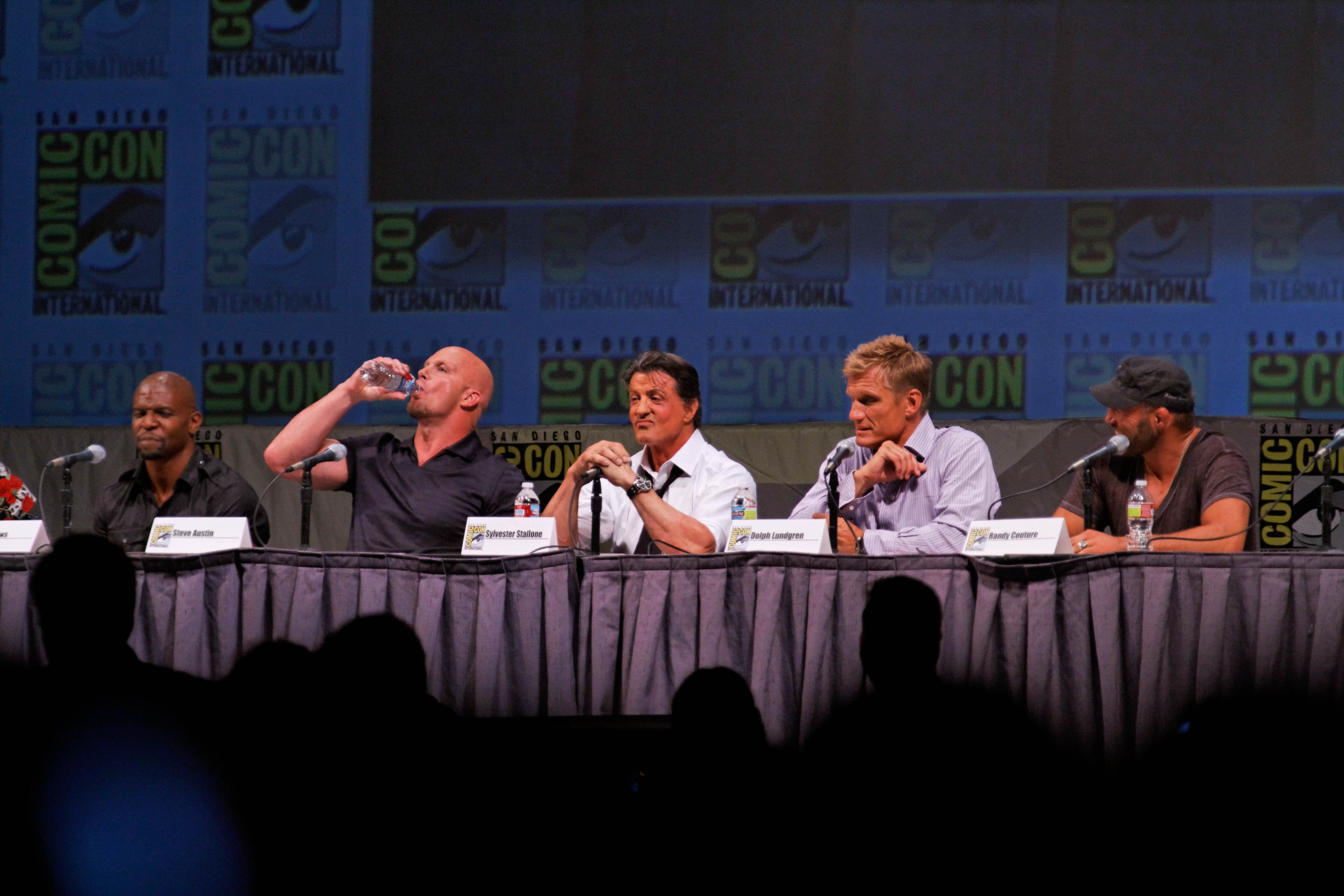
Lundgren with the cast of The Expendables at ComicCon 2010

In 2010, Lundgren made a guest star appearance on the TV series Chuck in the fourth-season premiere episode, "Chuck Versus the Anniversary", as Russian spy Marco, with references to Rocky IV's Ivan Drago. He then played a drug-addled assassin in the ensemble action film The Expendables, in a cast which includes popular action stars such as Stallone, Jason Statham, Jet Li, and Randy Couture as a group of elite mercenaries, tasked with a mission to overthrow a Latin American dictator. It was described by Lundgren as "an old-school, kick-ass action movie where people are fighting with knives and shooting at each other." The film received mixed reviews from critics but was very successful commercially, opening at number one at the box office in the United States, the United Kingdom China and India.

Lundgren was one of three hosts for the 2010 Melodifestivalen, where the Swedish contribution to the Eurovision Song Contest is selected. In the first installation on 6 February, Lundgren co-hosted the competition together with comedian Christine Meltzer and performer Måns Zelmerlöw. Lundgren's appearance was hailed by critics and audience, particularly his rendition of Elvis Presley's "A Little Less Conversation".

Lundgren played the lead role in Uwe Boll's In the Name of the King 2: Two Worlds, and had supporting roles in Jonas Åkerlund's Small Apartments and a thriller called Stash House. Principal photography for Universal Soldier: Day of Reckoning began on 9 May 2011 in Louisiana, and filming wrapped on One in the Chamber (co-starring Cuba Gooding Jr.) around the same time. The Expendables 2 entered principal photography in late September/early October 2011, with Lundgren reprising his role as Gunner Jensen. Filming wrapped in January 2012, and it was released by Lionsgate on 17 August later that year.

In 2013, Lundgren starred alongside Steve Austin in The Package. Directed by Jesse Johnson, principal photography wrapped in March 2012, and the film was released on 9 February 2013. For a direct-to-DVD film, The Package was not a financial success. In its first week of release, the film debuted at no. 81; grossing $1,469 at the domestic box office. He starred in a number of other films later that year, including Legendary, Battle of the Damned, Ambushed, and Blood of Redemption.

In 2014, Lundgren co-starred opposite Cung Le in the action film Puncture Wounds, and reprised his role as Gunner Jensen for the third time in The Expendables 3. He then wrote, produced, and starred alongside Tony Jaa and Ron Perlman in Skin Trade, an action thriller about human trafficking. Principal photography started on 2 February 2014 in Thailand, and wrapped in Vancouver; April the same year. The film received a limited theatrical release, followed by a Blu-ray and DVD release on 25 August 2015. In February, he filmed a cameo for the Coen brothers' 2016 comedy film Hail, Caesar!, portraying a Soviet submarine captain.

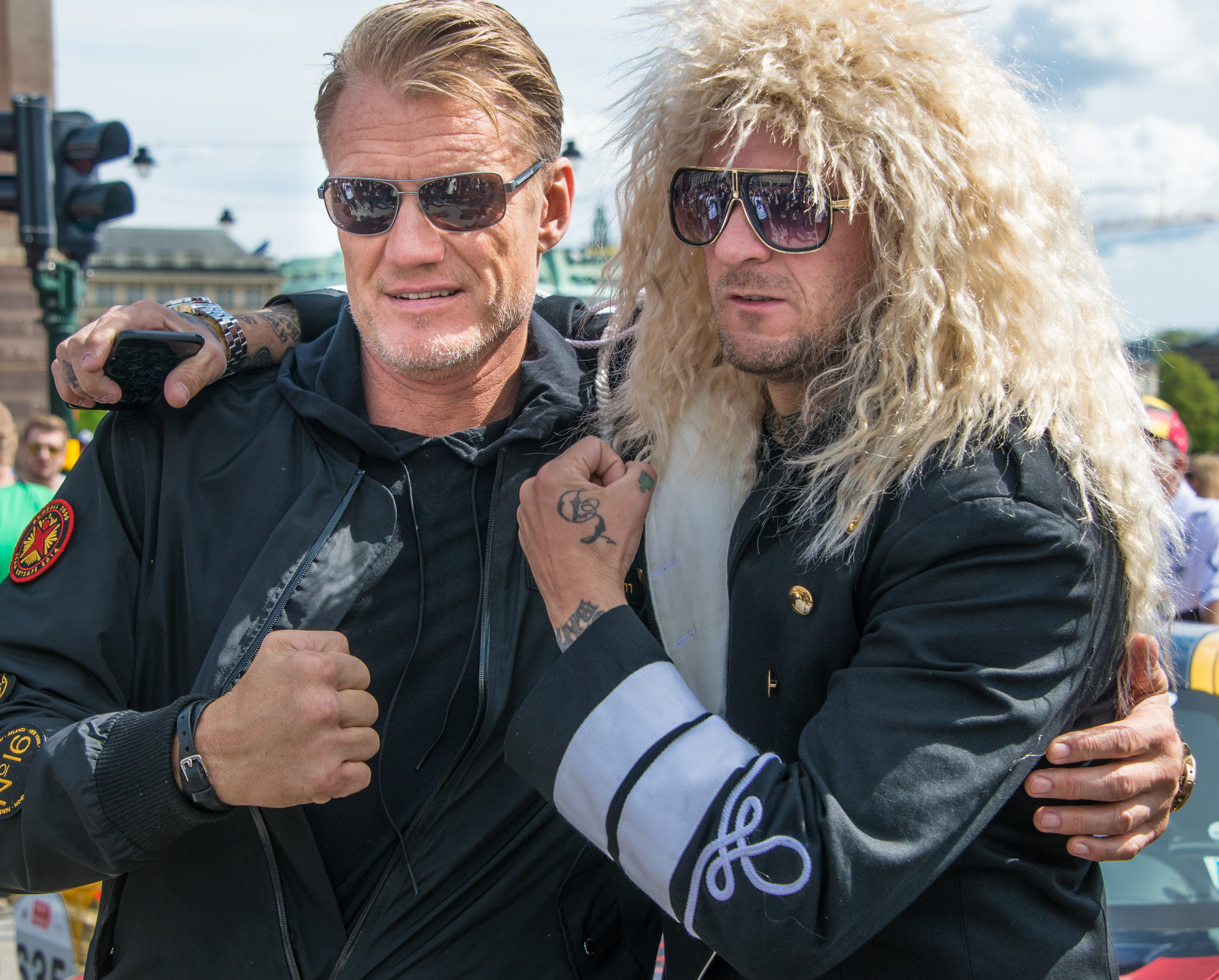
Lundgren and Mathew Pritchard at the 2015 annual Gumball 3000 event in Stockholm, Sweden

On 21 January 2015, Lundgren started filming straight-to-video film Shark Lake on the Mississippi Gulf Coast. This was followed by a further six weeks of filming in the "Reno-Tahoe area". In the film, he portrays Clint Gray, a black-market dealer of exotic species responsible for releasing a dangerous shark into Lake Tahoe. Directed by Jerry Dugan, the film's budget was $2 million. On 23 May, straight-to-video film War Pigs premiered at the GI Film Festival. In the film, Lundgren co-starred (alongside Luke Goss) as Captain Hans Picault, a French Legionnaire who trains a U.S. Army Infantry group to go behind enemy lines and exterminate the Nazis. In August 2015, he started filming Kindergarten Cop 2 in Ontario, Canada, a straight-to-video sequel to the 1990 comedy film that starred Arnold Schwarzenegger. He portrays Agent Reed, a law enforcement officer who must go undercover as a kindergarten teacher, in order to recover a missing flash drive from the Federal Witness Protection Program. Throughout that year, he starred in a number of other straight-to-video films, including the crime thriller The Good, the Bad and the Dead and the prison film Riot. He starred in the music video of Imagine Dragons's Believer, which was released on 7 March 2017. In August 2017, he portrayed the future version of Gil Shepard in the Syfy film Sharknado 5: Global Swarming.

In 2018, Black Water, an action thriller, directed by Pasha Patriki was released. Also starred Van Damme, this was their fifth collaboration between both actors as well as the first time they appear together as on-screen allies. Lundgren reprised his role of Ivan Drago from Rocky IV in Creed II, the 2018 sequel to Creed. He played an older, impoverished Drago in the film, which also introduces the character's son, Viktor. This marked the beginning of what New York has described as Lundgren's "comeback." Also that year, Lundgren appeared in the DC Extended Universe film Aquaman, from director James Wan, as the underwater king Nereus. Later in 2021, Lundgren starred and directed in the 2021 action film Castle Falls as Richard Ericson, in his first feature film as directed in nearly 12 years.

In 2022, Lundgren starred in a series of Old Spice advertisements (via deepfakes) to promote a new antiperspirant line of deodorant spray. The advertisements depicted the 65 year old actor as a young adult doing an "80s action movie spoof." He would later appear in FanDuel's "Powerful Hunch" campaign.

== Training and diet ==
Although Lundgren has never competed as a professional bodybuilder, he has been closely associated with bodybuilding and fitness since his role as Drago in the mid-1980s. Bodybuilding.com said, "Looking like a man in his 30s rather than his 50s, Lundgren is the poster boy of precise nutrition, supplementation and exercise application that he has practiced for over 35 years". In an interview with them, he claimed to often train up to six days a week, usually one-hour sessions completed in the morning, saying that "it's just one hour a day, and then you can enjoy the other 23 hours".

Although he had begun lifting weights as a teenager, he cites co-star Sylvester Stallone as the man who got him into serious bodybuilding for a period in the 1980s after he arrived in the U.S. Stallone had a lasting influence on his fitness regimen and diet, ensuring that he ate a much higher percentage of protein and split his food intake between five or six smaller meals a day. In 2023, he said in an interview that he took anabolic steroids on and off from the mid-'80s to the mid-'90s. Lundgren has professed never to have been "super strong", saying that, "I'm too tall and my arms are long. I think back then [Rocky IV] I was working with around 300 pounds on the bench and squat."

In a January 2011 interview with GQ, he announced he was working on releasing his own range of vitamins and supplements. He wrote an autobiographical fitness book, Train Like an Action Hero: Be Fit Forever, published in Sweden (by Bonnier Fakta) on 9 August 2011, offering tips he learned over the years to work out in various situations (with a busy schedule and a lot of traveling). It also discusses a detailed account of his earlier life and troubles. He cites a better quality of life as having inspired him to maintain his physical fitness.

When in Los Angeles, he trains at the Equinox Gym in Westwood and previously at home in Marbella, Spain, he trained at the Qi Sport Gym in Puerto Banús. Lundgren also spars and practices karate aside from weight lifting. He cites dead lifting and squats as the best exercises for muscle building. Lundgren is not a heavy drinker, but has professed on many occasions to being fond of tequila and cocktails, citing his knowledge in chemical engineering as "making really good drinks".

== Personal life ==
Lundgren splits his time between Stockholm and Los Angeles. In addition to his native Swedish, he speaks English fluently, as well as smaller amounts of French, German, Italian, Japanese, and Spanish, but is not fluent in those five languages as has often been reported.

He is an avid football fan. He supported Everton when he lived in Europe, but developed more of an interest in international football tournaments (such as the UEFA European Championship and the FIFA World Cup) after moving to Los Angeles.

During the 1980s, Lundgren had relationships with Jamaican singer Grace Jones and American model Paula Barbieri. While Lundgren was completing a master's degree in chemical engineering on an exchange program with the University of Sydney in Australia, Jones spotted him at a dance club and hired him as a bodyguard. Lundgren was whisked off to the United States, where he completed his final thesis.

In 1994, he married Anette Qviberg (b. 1966), a jewellery designer and fashion stylist, in Marbella. The couple decided they liked Marbella so much that they rented accommodations there for years, before eventually buying a family home there. They have two daughters: Ida Sigrid Lundgren (b. 1996) and Greta Eveline Lundgren (b. 2001), both born in Stockholm. Lundgren and Qviberg cited the reason for living outside Hollywood was to give their children as normal a childhood as possible. In early May 2009, three masked burglars reportedly broke into Lundgren's Marbella home. The burglars tied up and threatened his wife, but fled when they found a family photo and realized that the house was owned by Lundgren. Lundgren later stated he believed the intruders to be Eastern European and had asked contacts in Bulgaria to investigate them, but to no avail. After the incident, Lundgren's elder daughter, Ida, suffered from PTSD. His wife was the "most traumatized." He and his wife divorced in 2011.

Lundgren was in a relationship with Jenny Sandersson from 2011 to 2017. Lundgren became engaged to Norwegian personal trainer Emma Krokdal in June 2020. They married at their villa in Mykonos on 13 July 2023.

In May 2023, Lundgren revealed that he had been battling kidney cancer since 2015.

In February 2024, Lundgren and his wife, Emma Krokdal, officially became US citizens.

== Awards and honors ==
| Nominated work | Year | Award | Results |
|---|---|---|---|
| Rocky IV | 1985 | Marshall Trophy for Best Actor | Won |

=== Special awards ===
| Ceremony | Year | Award | Results |
|---|---|---|---|
| Málaga International Week of Fantastic Cinema | 2007 | Fantastic Lantern | Won |

| Nominated work | Year | Award | Results |
|---|---|---|---|
| Rocky IV | 2013 | Lifetime Achievement Award Best Actor Historical Blockbuster | Won |

== Exhibition boxing record ==
| 1 fight | 0 wins | 1 loss |
|---|---|---|
| By decision | 0 | 1 |

| No. | Result | Record | Opponent | Type | Round, time | Date | Age | Location | Notes |
|---|---|---|---|---|---|---|---|---|---|
| 1 | Lose | 0–1 | Oleg Taktarov | UD | 5 | 10 June 2007 | 49 years, 7 months, 8 days | Luzhniki Small Sports Arena, Moscow, Russia | |
