= Castle Falls =

2021 American action film directed by Dolph Lundgren

- Theatrical release poster
- Directed by: Dolph Lundgren
- Written by: Andrew Knauer
- Produced by: Andre Relis; Dolph Lundgren; Craig Baumgarten
- Starring: Dolph Lundgren; Scott Adkins; Jim Chandler; Kim Delonghi; Dave Halls; Scott Hunter; Robert Berlin; Ida Lundgren
- Cinematography: Frances Chen
- Edited by: Matthew Lorentz
- Music by: David Rosengren
- Production companies: Bondlt Media Capital; Buffalo 8 Productions; VMI Worldwide; Verdi Productions; Wonder Street; Yale Productions
- Distributed by: Shout! Factory
- Release date: December 3, 2021
- Running time: 89 minutes
- Country: United States
- Language: English
- Budget: $4 million
- Box office: $2,643

Castle Falls is a 2021 American action film starring and directed by Dolph Lundgren. It was produced by Lundgren with Andre Relis and Craig Baumgarten. The film co-stars Scott Adkins, Jim Chandler, Kim Delonghi, Dave Halls, Scott Hunter, Robert Berlin and Lundgren's real life daughter Ida Lundgren.

== Plot ==
Former MMA fighter Mike Wade works on the demolition crew for Castle Heights Hospital, an abandoned facility scheduled to be blown up in just a few hours. The crumbling building hides $3 million in cash stashed away by a now-imprisoned gang leader who intended to retrieve it one day.

Mike discovers the money and decides to take it. Richard Ericson, a corrections officer whose daughter is battling cancer, also learns of the money’s location. Richard heads to the hospital to secure the cash before the building comes down.

The gang that originally hid the money sends a team of armed men to recover the loot before the place is leveled. Mike and Richard cross paths and realize they must work together to survive.

With only 90 minutes left before the demolition, the two unlikely allies navigate the maze-like corridors, fend off attackers, and make tough decisions in a brutal race against time to escape the building alive with or without the money.

Eventually Mike fights Deacon on the rooftop of the building and severely beats him, leaving him writhing on the ground and unable to move. He jumps in a vehicle driven by Ericson as the 90 minutes ran out;the building is detonated, leaving Deacon to die. Deacon's men also die in the climax.

Ericson uses his share of the money to pay for his daughter's medical treatment, while Mike finds a renewed sense of purpose and hope for the future.

== Cast ==
- Dolph Lundgren as Richard Ericson
- Scott Adkins as Mike Wade
- Jim Chandler as Foreman
- Kim Delonghi as Kat
- Dave Halls as Vince
- Kevin Wayne as James
- Scott Hunter as Deacon Glass
- Luke Hawx as Inmate #2
- Billy Culbertson as Inmate / Busted Lip
- Leslie Sides as Mayor's Assistant
- Melanie Jeffcoat as Doctor
- Ida Lundgren as Emily Ericson
- Evan Elise Owens as Cop
- Justin B. Wooten as Duke
- Bill Billions as Walsh
- Evan Dane Taylor as Fighter
- Eric Gray as Lando
- Meagan Bown as News Reporter
- Robert Berlin as Damian Glass
- Vas Sanchez as George
- Alicia Roye as George's Wife
- Meg Deusner as Social Worker
- Nathan Harris as Construction Worker
- Ethan Melisano as MMA Fighter
- Samuel Puccio as MMA Coach
- A. Todd Baker as Mayor Lloyd Holmes
- Hassel Kromer as Construction Worker
- Edward Hall as Security Guard
- Bruce Cooper as Mayor's Security
- Kourtney Harper
- Derrick Goodman Jr. as Prisoner

== Production ==
In early press junkets for the film, the film was to be set in a condominium with Lundgren playing "Shea", one of two rival gang leaders, and Adkins playing an ex-fighter working as a janitor who stumbles upon the cash.

== Release ==
=== Theatrical ===
The film had a limited release in the United States on December 3, 2021.

=== Home media ===
It was released on Blu-ray and video on demand on December 28, 2021.

== Reception ==
=== Critical response ===
On the review aggregator website Rotten Tomatoes, 88% of 8 critics' reviews are positive, with an average rating of 5.50/10.

Debopriyaa Dutta of Screen Rant gave the film a positive review and rated it 2.5 stars out of 5 stars. She wrote, "Sporting skilled choreographed action sequences, Castle Falls offers a mildly satisfying viewing experience despite a weak and muddled storyline". Jacob Walker of Starburst rated the film 3 out of 5 rating and praised the film's thrills, decent action and the chemistry of Lundgren and Adkins: "Once the action kicks off in the last third of the film, however, it’s loads of fun. Adkins delivers his modern blend of taekwondo kicks and MMA techniques with gusto, and the gunfights and battles are relentless until the end. Lundgren and Adkins work really well together, Dolph’s world-weariness complimenting Scott’s energy and determinism. You will be cheering this bromance on until the credits roll, they just needed to be on-screen together a little earlier".

Phil Hoad of The Guardian gave the film a rating of 3 out of 5 and wrote, "Dolph Lundgren and Scott Adkins make a fine odd couple in this meatily satisfying action film - once it gets moving".
