= Raicho Vasilev =

Bulgarian stunt/actor (born 1975)

Raycho Vasiliev
- Born: Raycho Stevanov Vasiliev; 17 September 1975 (age 50); Smolyan, Bulgaria
- Occupations: Actor; Stunt Performer; Stunt Coordinator
- Known for: Gnaeus in the Starz TV series Spartacus: Blood and Sand and its prequel Spartacus: Gods of the Arena.
- Television: Spartacus: Blood and Sand; Spartacus: Gods of the Arena

Raicho Vasilev (Bulgarian: Райчо Василев) is a Bulgarian stuntman/actor best known for his role as Gladiator Gnaeus on the TV series Spartacus: Blood and Sand and its prequel Spartacus: Gods of the Arena.

== Biography ==
Raicho started his professional career in 1999 when he was a stunt performer in the movie Delta Force.

Raicho Vasilev was also Liam McIntyre's stunt double, in the TV Show Spartacus.

== Filmography and Works ==
=== Actor ===
Title	Character	Year
City of Fear	Russian Thug #1	2000
Ogledaloto na dyavola	Bodyguard	2001
Pythons 2	Dirc	2002
In Hell	Andrei	2003
Out for a Kill	Bulgarian Thug	2003
Alien Lockdown	Monie	2004
Control	Vlas	2004
Unstoppable	St. Nevis Guard #1	2004
Man with the Screaming Brain	Bartender	2005
Path of Destruction	Bodyguard	2005
Hammerhead: Shark Frenzy	Guard #2	2005
Submerged	Ender	2005
The Russian Specialist	Ahmed	2005
The Turkish Gambit	Bodyguard	2005
S.S. Doomtrooper	Corporal Potter	2006
Undisputed II: Last Man Standing	Guard	2006
Children of Wax	Skinhead	2007
Diamond Dogs	Zhukov	2007
Grendel	Sigmund	2007
Reign of the Gargoyles	British Soldier	2007
Until Death	Crew Member	2007
Cyclops	Tarquin	2008
Command Performance	Anton	2009
Direct Contact	Boris	2009
Double Identity	Walther	2009
THOR: Hammer of the Gods	Heimdall	2009
It's Not Real Until You Shoot It: Making HILLS RUN RED	Himself	2009
Ninja	Gunman	2009
The Hills Run Red	Babyface Actor	2009
The Immortal Voyage of Captain Drake	Moony	2009
Spartacus: Blood and Sand	Gnaeus	2010
Cold Fusion	Ukrainian Soldier # 1	2011
Conan the Barbarian	City Guard #1	2011
Spartacus: Gods of the Arena	Gnaeus	2011
Re-Kill	Elvis	2012
Undercover	Morskia	2012
Sniper: Legacy	Afghanistan Leader	2014
Mechanic: Resurrection	Fletcher, Crain's Guard	2016
Acts of Vengeance	Timofei	2017

=== Stunt Performer/ Stunt Coordinator ===
Title	Character	Year
Operation Delta Force 4: Deep Fault	Utility Stunts	1999
City of Fear	Video Stunts	2000
For the Cause	Stunt Performer, Stunts, Utility Stunts	2000
Aleph	TV movie Stunts	2000
Death, Deceit & Destiny Aboard the Orient Express	Stunt Double - Uncredited	2001
High Adventure	Stunts	2001
Mindstorm	Stunts	2001
Pechalbata	Stunt Performer, Stunts	2001
Replicant	Stunts	2001
The Gaul	Stunts	2001
The Order	Stunts - Uncredited, Utility Stunts: Bulgaria	2001
U.S. Seals II	Video Stunts	2001
The Grey Zone	Stunts	2001
Antibody	Video Stunts	2002
Caesar	TV movie Stunts	2002
Derailed	Stunts	2002
Interceptor Force 2	TV movie Stunts	2002
Marie Marmaille	TV movie Stunts	2002
Podgryavane na vcherashniya obed	Stunts	2002
Air Marshal	Stunts	2003
Deep Shock	TV movie Stunt Performer	2003
Dragon Fighter	Video Stunt Performer	2003
In Hell	Stunts	2003
Out for a Kill	Video Stunts	2003
Rapid Exchange	Video Stunts	2003
Air Strike	Video Stunt Team	2004
Alien Lockdown	TV movie Stunt Team	2004
Control	Stunts	2004
Dragon Storm	TV movie Stunts	2004
Nature Unleashed: Avalanche	Video Stunts	2004
Puppet Master vs Demonic Toys	TV movie Stunt Coordinator	2004
Spartacus	TV movie Stunt Performer	2004
Unstoppable	Stunt Team	2004
Alien Apocalypse	TV movie Stunt Coordinator	2005
Bullet: Ek Dhamaka	Stunt Coordinator	2005
Man with the Screaming Brain	Stunt Coordinator	2005
Manticore	TV movie Stunts	2005
Nature Unleashed: Volcano	Video Stunts	2005
Target of Opportunity	Stunts	2005
Dragon Dynasty	TV movie Stunts	2006
Eragon	Stunts	2006
The Abandoned	Stunts	2006
Tristan & Isolde	Stunts	2006
The Rebel of L	Stunt Coordinator	2006
Children of Wax	Stunts - As Raycho Vasilev	2007
Kaafila	Stunt Coordinator	2007
The Last Legion	Stunts	2007
Godfather: The Legend Continues	Stunt Performer	2007
War and Peace	TV mini-series Stunts - 3 episodes Stunts - As Raicho Stevanov Vasiliev	2007
Day of the Dead	Stunts	2008
The Chronicles of Narnia: Prince Caspian	Stunts	2008
Spartacus: Vengeance	TV series Stunt Performer - 4 episodes, 2012 Stunts - 1 Episode	2010
Spartacus: Gods of the Arena	TV mini-series Stunt Performer - 6 episodes	2011
Cold Fusion	Fight Stunt Coordinator	2011
Conan the Barbarian	Stunt Performer - Uncredited	2011
Red Faction: Origins	TV movie Stunt Performer	2011
Branded	Stunt Performer	2012
The Expendables 2	Stunt Performer	2012
Taken: The Search for Sophie Parker	fight coordinator / stunt coordinator	2013
The Legend of Hercules	stunt double: Liam McIntyre	2014
Hercules	stunt double: Tobias Santelmann	2014
Game of Thrones	stunt performer - 2 episodes	2015
Ash vs Evil Dead	stunt performer - 2 episodes	2015

=== Commercials ===
Title	Company Type	Year	Country
Chio Chips	Snacks	2010	Bulgaria
Fear 3 ( Computer Game)	Video games	2010	USA
Mobile Company "Vivatel"	Cellphone	2007	Bulgaria
Mobile Company M-Tel	Cellphone	2005	Bulgaria
Beer "Zagorka"	Alcohol Beverage	2004	Bulgaria
Beer "Kamenitza"	Alcohol Beverage	2002	Bulgaria
Chewing Gum "Dental"	Snacks	2002	Bulgaria

=== Music Video Clips ===
Title	Music Group	Year	Country
Тя иска	Дони	2004	-
Fuck Off	Slavi Trifonov and Ku Ku Bend	2003	-
Борбата	Ice Cream	2001	Bulgaria
Cool Spase	Antibiotica	2001	Bulgaria
Devil	666	1999	-
