= The Mechanik =

- Official DVD cover
- Directed by: Dolph Lundgren
- Written by: Dolph Lundgren; Bryan Edward Hill
- Produced by: Anton Hoeger
- Starring: Dolph Lundgren; Ben Cross; Hilda Van Der Meulen; Olivia Lee
- Cinematography: Ross W. Clarkson
- Edited by: Joe Plenys
- Music by: Elia Cmiral
- Release date: October 3, 2005
- Running time: 94 minutes
- Countries: Germany; United States
- Languages: Russian; English

The Mechanik (released under the alternative title known as The Russian Specialist) is a 2005 German-American vigilante action film starring and directed by Dolph Lundgren, who also co-wrote the screenplay with Bryan Edward Hill. The film co-stars Ben Cross, Ivan Petrushinov, Olivia Lee, and Raicho Vasilev. Most of the film was shot in Bulgaria and there are many Bulgarian actors in the cast as well.

== Plot ==
Retired Spetsnaz soldier Nikolai "Nick" Cherenko is a mechanic in the small Russian village of Gorelovo. His wife, Alina and son, Vanya are killed by Russian mob boss Aleksandr "Sasha" Popov when he and his gang start a shootout after a bad drug deal. Nick arms himself and takes his revenge one night, killing five of Popov's men. Finally he shoots Popov in the face, leaving him for dead.

Seven years later, Nick works as a mechanic in Los Angeles. Wealthy widow Mary Abramoff tracks him down and pleads with him to go to Russia and retrieve her daughter Julia, who has been kidnapped and forced into the sex trade. Nick refuses, claiming he is just a mechanic. John Ridley, Mary's attorney reveals that they know his past, but he continues to refuse. Finally he is convinced when Mary reveals that the man who killed her husband and took her daughter is Sasha, still alive, and Nick sets off to St. Petersburg, Russia.

British mercenary William Burton offers to take a prostitute, Natalia, away with him after "a job," but she refuses. He stumbles, drunk, into his apartment, where he is confronted by Nick. After sobering him up, Nick takes him to the club where Sasha hides out. Nick immediately attacks the guards and demands to see Sasha despite Burton's insistence they play it cool. Burton pulls him away and says they will return the next night; Burton fears Nick has compromised their mission.

The following night, Natalia lets Nick, Burton and a group of Russian mercenaries (Yuri, Sergei, Alexi, and Pavel) into the club. They find Julia, strung out, and escape the club in a shootout where only two of the Russian mercenaries, Yuri, and Sergei survive; Sergei has been badly wounded in the leg. They begin driving to the Finnish border and Sasha's thugs give chase. Nick buys them time by luring the thugs into a tunnel, changing cars and setting off a bomb.

The group stop at a farm house to tend to Sergei then proceed to the border which has closed for the night; they stay with their contact, Misha, one of Nick's former Spetsnaz soldiers. Sasha stops at the farm house and determines Nick is headed for the border and he continues to chase them. The next morning, Sergei dies of his injuries, and Sasha arrives and Nick's group (Burton, Yuri, and Misha) prepares for a fight. Sasha tries to lure Burton out by bringing Natalia, whom he kills, angering Burton. Nick and his group split up and begin picking off Sasha's men. Finally, Nick confronts Sasha, who grabs Julia. She scratches his face to distract him and Nick shoots his leg; he crawls away but Nick executes him with a shot to the head.

Burton and Yuri accompany Julia across the border to Finland where she is reunited with her mother. Nick walks away from the village to Saint Petersburg, his path unknown.

== Cast ==
- Dolph Lundgren as Nikolai "Nick" Cherenko
- Ben Cross as William Burton
- Ivan Petrushinov as Aleksandr "Sasha" Popov
- Olivia Lee as Julia Abramoff
- Raicho Vasilev as Ahmed
- Asen Blatechki as Yuri
- Antony Argirov as Serie
- Valeri Yordanov as Alexi
- Dean Angelov as Alexi
- Ivaylo Geraskov as Leo
- Hilda Van Der Meulen as Alina Cherenko
- Naum Shopov as Vanya Cherenko
- Atanas Srebrev as John Ridley
- Levana Finkelstein as Mary Abramoff
- Nikolai Sotirov as Victor Chertoff
- Emil Markov as Misha
- Marianna Stanisheva as Alla
- Teodor Yordanov as Vladimir
- Alexander Tsitkilov as Pushkin
- Anastasiya Panayotova as Hooker
- Barry Evans as Barry
- Rushi Vidinliev as Taxi Driver
- Maria Ilieva as Natalya
- Nikolai Hadjiminev as Garage Boss
- Nikolay Georgiev as Thug
- Youanna Boukovska as Counter Girl
- Stefan Ivanov as Doorman Guard 1
- Chavdar Simeonov as Doorman Guard 2
- Maria Stancheva as Cocaine Girl
- Veneta Harizanova as Cocaine Girlfriend
- Slavi Slavov as Nevsky
- Kiril Efremov as Man 1
- Stefan Shterev as Man 2
- Valentin Burski as German Man 1
- Velizar Binev as German Man 2
- Diyan Machev as Dimitri
- Andrey Slabakov as Gypsy Father
- Asen Mutafchiev as Luda Child
- Victor Boichev as Doctor
- Monika Ivanova as Masha Child
- Nikoleta Stoicheva as Luva Child
- Lubo Ganev as Sasha's Thug # 4
