= Battle of the Damned =

- Theatrical release poster
- Directed by: Christopher Hatton
- Written by: Christopher Hatton
- Produced by: Ehud Bleiberg; Christopher Hatton; Leon Tong
- Starring: Dolph Lundgren; Melanie Zanetti; Matt Doran; David Field
- Cinematography: Roger Chingirian
- Edited by: Danny Rafic
- Music by: Joe Ng Ting; Si Hao
- Production company: Bleiberg Entertainment
- Distributed by: Anchor Bay Entertainment
- Release date: July 12, 2013
- Running time: 89 minutes
- Country: United States
- Language: English
- Budget: $8 million

Battle of the Damned is a 2013 American science fiction horror film written, produced and directed by Christopher Hatton. The film stars Dolph Lundgren, Melanie Zanetti, Matt Doran and David Field. Following a deadly viral outbreak, private soldier Max Gatling (Lundgren) leads a handful of survivors and a team of robots in a fight against an army of the dead.

Lundgren said of the film, "This time I'm up against virus-infected human zombies, 'Eaters' as we call them. Max is sent into an infected, abandoned city to find the daughter of a rich industrialist. He gets more than he bargained for. 'I wish I would've asked for more money', in Max's own words. Fortunately I enlist some kick-ass, run-away robots to help me in the battle".

== Plot ==
A group of mercenaries led by Maj. Max Gatling are fleeing from a failed rescue attempt, having been hired by a rich industrialist to enter a zombie-infested city to rescue his daughter Jude. At the extraction point, Gatling tells the other survivor he is staying to find Jude and complete the mission. He eventually locates Jude and tells her he is going to get her out of the city, and she takes him to other survivors. There, he is introduced to the survivors including group leader Duke, Reese, Elvis, Lynn, and Anna. Jude is revealed to be in a relationship with Reese and pregnant with his child. The next day when Gatling, Jude, and the others go out to retrieve gasoline from a gas station, Gatling attempts to get Jude out of the city by force when she refuses to go without the others. However, he is stopped by the others and left for dead. After discovering Jude is pregnant, Reese rushes to Gatling's aid so that Jude can be taken out of the city. At this point it is revealed that not only is Jude's father some rich industrialist, but he is also the one who caused the zombie pandemic. While returning to the stronghold to get Jude, Gatling and Reese discover a band of prototype non-programmed robots. Gatling reprograms the robots and proceeds to the stronghold. When it is revealed that the city is to be firebombed, Gatling and all of the survivors make preparations to escape.

On the day of the escape, Gatling, Jude, the survivors, and the robots shoot down and kill many zombies along the way. When taking defensive positions while being attacked at a junkyard, Duke ditches them all and hides away. The robots also malfunction and one begins to attack Gatling. Gatling destroys the robot, and the rest of them reboot. Gatling, Jude, Reese, and the remaining survivors escape the junkyard in a car being pushed by the remaining robots. Duke is left behind and eaten by zombies. Gatling and the others then arrive at a car parking complex and go underground while the robots hold back the zombies. Once the Zombies start swarming the car park, Gatling and the others struggle to fight them off. Gatling finds that one of the robots is still functioning and he sends it to find Jude.

As the firebombing starts and reaches the complex, Gatling, Jude, and Reese jump into a partly flooded level of the complex to escape the fire. Once the firebombing ceases, Jude and Reese leave the complex, and all of the city is shown to be entirely destroyed. They meet up with Gatling, who reveals to Reese that his mission is not only to take Jude home, but to kill anybody that can whistle-blow on the outbreak. But knowing that Jude and Reese are expecting, Gatling decides to let Reese live and the three of them leave together with the robot, having survived, who Gatling asks to get him a coffee.

== Cast ==
- Dolph Lundgren as Major Max Gatling
- Melanie Zanetti as Jude
- Matt Doran as Reese
- David Field as Duke
- Jen Kuo Sung as Elvis
- Lydia Look as Lynn
- Oda Maria as Anna
- Jeff Pruitt as Smiley
- Kerry Wong as Dean
- Esteban Cueto as Hernandez
- Broadus Mattison as Broadus
- Timothy Cooper as Robot (Voice)

== Release ==
The film was released on December 26, 2013, in the United Kingdom and February 18, 2014 in the United States.

== Reception ==
=== Critical response ===
Battle of the Damned was met with mixed reviews.

Neil John Buchanan of Starburst gave the movie eight out of ten stars and wrote, "Forget The Walking Dead, Battle of the Damned takes the genre back to its grass roots of horror." JoBlo.com rated it seven out of a possible ten, saying, "Well shot, action packed, with most of the cast being competent (I loved Melanie Zanetti), Battle of the Damned hit the trashy pleasure spot! Sure the middle section got bogged down a bit, the budget constraints sometimes showed, the shaky cam was annoying at times and Oda Maria's top staying on was a travesty (there was no other purpose to that role), but on the whole Lundgren + Zombies + Robots + Mayhem = ALL GOOD! For B Movie lovers only!" Nav Qateel of Influx Magazine rated the movie C+, and wrote that "putting the many faults aside, it still had its moments, and ultimately entertained, thanks to some good acting, not bad action and silly zombies." Ben Bussey of Brutal as Hell wrote, "While it sadly lacks the budget to really do justice to its madcap vision, it doesn’t neglect to bring us a likeable cast and plenty of breezy banter. The end result isn’t likely to become anyone’s new favourite movie, but it’s a diverting enough 90 minutes."

Among the more negative reviews of Battle of the Damned, Brent McKnight of PopMatters rated it three out of a possible ten, and wrote that "the absurdity wears thin and you're left to rely on things like story and character, and there is very, very little of either going on here." Patrick Bromley of DVD Verdict ruled it "not great", and wrote, "Some decent special effects and the presence of Dolph Lundgren make it watchable, though it's mostly for non-discerning genre fans. Horror fans looking for a zombie movie fix will be disappointed." Peter Turner of Filmoria gave the film two out of five stars, and deemed it "damned disappointing", commenting that "Lundgren may be passed [sic] his prime and the zombies far outweigh the robots but Battle of the Damned does give a lot of bang for its limited bucks." Manly Movie rated it three out of a possible ten, and said, "It's a horror show alright, a torture show even, but not for the reasons intended. And they say the best torture makes time drag on. Battle of the Damned is confirmation of this, it's the longest 85 minutes I've experienced in some time."
