= Missionary Man (film) =

- DVD cover
- Directed by: Dolph Lundgren
- Written by: Dolph Lundgren; Frank Valdez
- Produced by: Andrew Stevens
- Starring: Dolph Lundgren
- Cinematography: Bing Rao
- Edited by: Michael Kuge
- Music by: Elia Cmiral
- Production companies: Stage 6 Films; Andrew Stevens Entertainment
- Distributed by: Sony Pictures Home Entertainment
- Release date: November 29, 2007
- Running time: 93 minutes
- Country: United States
- Language: English

Missionary Man is a 2007 American action film co-written, directed by and starring Dolph Lundgren. It was the first film released by Stage 6 Films.

== Plot ==
A stranger named Ryder (Dolph Lundgren) comes into a small Texas town for the funeral of his good friend J.J., a local Native American carpenter. Ryder spends his time in town reading the Bible while drinking straight tequila. Ryder talks to J.J.'s sister Nancy (Kateri Walker) who says that J.J. drowned in a river, but J.J.'s teenage son Junior (John D. Montoya) does not believe that. Local businessman John Reno (Matthew Tompkins) introduces himself to Ryder and tells Murphy (Charles Solomon Jr.), one of his employees, to keep an eye on Ryder. Sheriff Acoma (James Chalke), who seems to be alcoholic, tells Ryder that he should leave town.

Ryder beats up a group of Reno's thugs who are beating a local drug user named Billy (Jonny Cruz). White Deer (August Schellenberg), the father of Nancy and J.J., talks to Nancy's 15-year-old daughter Kiowa (Chelsea Ricketts), who is Junior's older sister. Kiowa believes that J.J., who was a member of the tribal council, was killed because he knew something about Reno. Kiowa thinks that some of the tribal council members might be on Reno's side.

Chief Dan (Richard Ray Whitman) announces that Assistant Chief Lance (Titos Menchaca) has suggested that the council still discuss a proposal for the building of a state-of-the-art casino on tribal property by Lance's construction group. This would bring many new jobs and much revenue for the tribe's people, but the council is concerned with the many negative aspects of it. J.J. had proposed a plan that offers more highly skilled jobs and training for the tribe's people and takes advantage of gaming profits without the negative aspects.

Billy tells Ryder that Reno runs the town and had J.J. murdered. Nancy tells Sheriff Acoma something has to be done about Reno. Sheriff Acoma says that the last time he tried to investigate Reno, a judge quickly called the investigation off. Kiowa and Junior go to a grocery store, where clerk said that J.J. came in and got a case of beer on the day of his death. But Kiowa knows that J.J. did not drink, but Reno is a drinker.

Kiowa goes outside and sees some of Reno's thugs roughing Junior up. They tell Kiowa to tell Nancy to drop J.J.'s proposal that the tribal council is considering. They start roughing up Kiowa, and then Ryder shows up and beats them up. Ryder takes Kiowa and Junior to their home, and they invite him in for dinner. During dinner, Junior says that as soon as he turns 18, he is going to leave the town and not end up like J.J. did. Kiowa admits to Ryder that she never knew her father, and that J.J. took care of her.

That night, Billy witnesses a drug deal between Reno and some Mexican men. Reno has his men kill the Mexican men, and then Reno tells Murphy to find Billy and kill him. Later, Lance says that Reno's ways of doing things attract too much attention. Lance had told Reno that if he got J.J. out of the way, then Lance would get approval to build the casino. Reno plans to kill Nancy and her family in order to make sure no one is in the way.

Ryder is teaching some of the Bible to some kids that White Deer regularly teaches, and Junior yells for Nancy to come down to the old camp ground near their home. Junior has found Billy, who was shot in the arm. They take Billy to the house, and some of Reno's men arrive. Ryder beats them up, and shoots up their vehicles. Ryder has White Deer take Kiowa and Junior to a safe place. Ryder and Nancy find Sheriff Acoma, and tell him that Reno's men shot Billy because Billy witnessed the drug deal. Reno shows up and talks about filing assault charges against Ryder for beating his men up.

Reno offers to let Ryder work for him, but Ryder refuses. One of Reno's men tries to beat Ryder up, but Ryder shoots up Reno's bar. Sheriff Acoma arrives and tells Reno to put the gun down. Reno calls a gang of bikers into town, and the gang is led by a man named Jarfe (John Enos III). They are the bikers that Reno is trying to get the casino built for, and Jarfe had also shot Ryder once before. Jarfe and his gang are also the biker gang that killed Nancy's husband, the father of Kiowa and Junior. By now, Billy is out in the town, and Jarfe finds him and fatally shoots him.

Jarfe heads into the hotel that Ryder is staying in, and Jarfe and his men attack the hotel's owner. They kill a pair of arriving deputies. When Ryder gets into town, Jarfe sees him, and sends his men after him. Ryder starts killing Jarfe's men as they find him. Ryder gets some help from Hoss (Brad Imes), a man who used to work for Reno. Sheriff Acoma finds Reno with his two main henchmen, Murphy and Gomez (Lawrence Varnado). Sheriff Acoma kills Murphy and Gomez, and knocks Reno to the floor. Ryder finds Jarfe and shoots him, using the gun that Jarfe shot Ryder with. Later, Sheriff Acoma locks Reno up, and Ryder leaves town.

== Cast ==
- Dolph Lundgren as Ryder
- Kateri Walker as Nancy
- Chelsea Ricketts as Kiowa
- Matthew Tompkins as John Reno
- John D. Montoya as Junior (credited as John Montoya)
- James Chalke as Sheriff Acoma
- John Enos III as Jarfe
- Lawrence Varnado as Gomez
- Charles Solomon Jr. as Murphy
- Jonny Cruz as Billy
- August Schellenberg as White Deer
- Brad Imes as Hoss
- Morgana Shaw as Tiger

== Production ==
Lundgren shot the film on Super 16. Due to a down-conversion gone wrong from HD to DVD, the picture quality and colors do not match the HD master that was approved by director Lundgren. Lundgren did not use a stunt double and made the film in 24 first unit days and 3 second unit days.

== Release ==
Missionary Man premiered in Dallas, played for an exclusive one-week theatrical engagement in San Diego and was screened at the 2008 AFI Dallas Film Festival.

=== Deleted scenes ===
The DVD features an alternative opening. Another deleted scene features Ryder's Indian friends laughing at the thugs Ryder has defeated and humiliated by making them pull their trousers down and walk away. An unusually happy Ryder enthusiastically shouts, "Let's throw their guns into the river!"

== Reception ==
David Walker of DVD Talk rated it 1/5 stars and called it a "disappointing ripoff" of several better films. Michael Buening of PopMatters rated it 2/10 stars and wrote, "I don’t blame Lundgren for attempting to forge a professional identity more developed than Ivan Drago, but he fails miserably in this overly self-serious quest for maturity."
