= Legendary (2013 film) =

3D science fiction film by Eric Styles

- Directed by: Eric Styles
- Written by: Andy Briggs
- Produced by: Matthew Kuipers; Xiaodong Liu; Christopher Milburn
- Starring: Scott Adkins; Dolph Lundgren; Lydia Leonard; James Lance
- Production companies: Midsummer Films; GFM Films; China Film Group
- Distributed by: China Film Group Corporation (China)
- Release dates: 17 May 2013 (Cannes); 29 July 2014 (United States)
- Countries: China; United Kingdom
- Language: English

Legendary is a 2013 3D science fiction film directed by Eric Styles. The film stars Scott Adkins and Dolph Lundgren and was filmed in China.

== Plot ==
The film follows Travis Preston, a cryptozoologist who travels to China with a team in search of evidence of a legendary creature after a series of mysterious deaths of construction workers.

== Cast ==
- Scott Adkins as Travis Preston
- Dolph Lundgren as Jim Harker
- Yi Huang as Dr. Lan Zeng
- Nathan Lee as Brandon Hua
- James Lance as Doug McConnel
- Lydia Leonard as Katie Langley
- Le Geng as Jianyu
- Murray Clive Walker as Chuck
- Caiyu Yang as Bai Xi
- Shengye Li as Han Wu
- David Thomas Jenkins as Fry
- Tom Austen as Scott
- Victor Sobchak as Vadim
- Paul Philip Clark as Karl
- Ivan Kotik as Greg
- Zhongyou Guo as Coroner
- Bo Xu as Construction Guard
