= Command Performance (2009 film) =

- Promotional release poster
- Directed by: Dolph Lundgren
- Screenplay by: Steve Latshaw; Dolph Lundgren
- Story by: Dolph Lundgren
- Produced by: Les Weldon; Danny Lerner
- Starring: Dolph Lundgren; Melissa Smith; Hristo Shopov; Dave Legeno; Ida Lundgren
- Cinematography: Marc Windon
- Edited by: Peter Hollywood
- Music by: Adam Nordén
- Production company: Nu Image
- Release date: November 3, 2009
- Running time: 93 minutes
- Country: United States
- Language: English
- Budget: $6 million

Command Performance is a 2009 American action film starring and directed by Dolph Lundgren, also written with Steve Latshaw. The film co-stars Melissa Smith, Hristo Shopov, Dave Legeno, and Lundgren's daughter Ida Lundgren in her feature film debut.

== Plot ==
In August 1991, Communist military hard-liners attempted a coup against Soviet President Mikhail Gorbachev. The coup failed, and all its members were arrested; from the ashes of the old Soviet Union, the modern Russian Federation was born.

At the request of Russian president Alexei Petrov, whose daughters Anna and Yana are fans, pop sensation Venus performs a concert in Moscow. The concert turns bloody when armed men led by Oleg Kazov take the concertgoers hostage. It seems that Oleg has a personal vendetta against Petrov. Former biker gang member Joe, the drummer of CMF, the opening rock band, decides to fight the criminals. Back in the US, when Joe was still in the biker gang, Colombian drug dealers wanting to collect a debt went to Joe's apartment and fatally shot his brother. Joe hunted the men down and killed them, and ever since has tried to stay away from guns, because they remind him of his brother's murder.

Most of the civilians and staff, including Venus's manager and brother Enzo, are killed by Oleg's men. The sole survivors are Joe, Venus, news reporter Ali Connor, American ambassador Jim Bradley, Presidential Security Service agent Mikhail Kapista, President Petrov, and his two daughters.

It turns out that Oleg's father was Marshal Dmitri Kazov, a WWII hero in Stalingrad, and former Soviet Minister of Defence, who led the failed coup against Gorbachev in 1991. Oleg was part of the coup as well. After the coup failed, special forces raided the Kazov house; in the chaos, Dmitri killed Oleg's mother and then himself. Oleg, then a captain in the Russian army, immigrated to the United States, where he got arrested for petty crimes, and ended up returning to Russia three weeks prior to the concert. The prosecutor of Marshal Dmitri Kazov, Oleg, and other coup members in 1991 was a young Alexei Petrov, before he became the president of Russia. Oleg thus organised the attack to seek revenge on Petrov, because he blames Petrov for the special forces raid that ended in his parents' deaths; Petrov ordered the raid and followed the troops into the Kazov house.

It is up to Joe and Mikhail make their way through the arena, and bring down Oleg and his men.

== Cast ==
- Dolph Lundgren as Joe Reynolds
- Melissa Smith as Angie / Venus
- Hristo Shopov as President Alexei Petrov
- Dave Legeno as Oleg Kazov
- Clement von Franckenstein as Ambassador Jim Bradley
- James Chalke as Vladimir
- Zahary Baharov as Mikhail Kapista
- Ivaylo Geraskov as Leonid Gordov
- Shelly Varod as Ali Connor
- Katarzyna Wolejnio as Major Pavlikova
- Ida Lundgren as Anna Petrova
- Robin Dobson as Yana Petrova
- Raicho Vasilev as Anton
- Slavi Slavov as Captain Simenov
- Naum Shopov as Peter
- Atanas Srebrev as Enzo
- Vladimir Kolev as Nikolai
- Harry Anichkin as General Voroshilov
- Nikolai Iliev as Aide
- Anna Kulinova as The Bartender
- Darin Angelov as Cameraman
- Dejan Kamenov as Vasily
- Rene Shindarov as Young Oleg Kazov
- Nadejda Ivanova as Pretty Woman
- Nikolai Stanoev as Ali's Soundman
- Yulian Vergov as Command Aide
- Krasimir Todorov as D-2 Cmf
- Yavor Alexandrov as D-2 Cmf
- Alexander Obretenov as D-2 Cmf
- Desislav Semerdjiev as D-2 Cmf
- Dimitar Karnev as D-2 Cmf
- Velislav Pavlov as Merc # 1
- Rosen Kovachev as Merc # 2
- Dimo Dimov as Merc # 3
- Tihomir Tenev as Merc # 4
- Lazar Nikolov as Merc # 5
- Goran Ganchev as Merc # 6
- Pasha as Suit # 1
- Mark Coolidge Johnson as Suit # 2
- Les Weldon as Suit # 3
- Ivaylo Spasimirov as Young President Petrov (uncredited)
- Dimiter Doichinov as Terrorist (uncredited)
- Valentin Ganev as Secretary (uncredited)
- Niki Iliev as Aide (uncredited)
- Andrey Kovalev as 'Pilgrim' Lead Singer (uncredited)
- Kathryn Le as Stage Manager (uncredited)
- Roselbel Rafferr as Rock Girl (uncredited)
- Irson Kudikova as Irson (uncredited)

== Production ==
Filming took place between August and September 2008 in Sofia, Bulgaria and Moscow, Russia.

Dolph Lundgren wanted to use his drumming skills on-screen, and the story was inspired by a concert Madonna did for Russian President Vladimir Putin.

This movie features the songs "Breakdown" and "Girl" ("6" on the album version) from the band D2, Lost In Love from Melissa Smith, "Ne Gasite Svechu / Keep The Candle Burning" from Andrey Kovalev and "September Rain" from Irson Kudikova.

== Release ==
The film premiered at the Ischia Global Film & Music Festival in Italy on July 18, 2009.

It was released on direct-to-DVD in the United States on November 3, 2009.
