= List of Bulgarian films of the 2000s =

A list of the most notable films produced in Bulgaria during the first decade of the 21st century ordered by year of release. For an alphabetical list of articles on Bulgarian films, see Category:Bulgarian films.

== List ==
=== 2000 ===
Title	Title (Latin) English	Director	Length	Cast	Notes
	Death, Deceit and Destiny Aboard the Orient Express	Mark Roper	92 min	Richard Grieco, Christoph Waltz, Romina Mondello, Jennifer Nitsch	thriller, also filmed in US and Canada

=== 2001 ===
Title	Title (Latin) English	Director	Length	Cast	Notes
Съдбата като плъх	Fate as a Rat	Ivan Pavlov			
Писмо до Америка	Letter to America	Iglika Trifonova			drama

=== 2002 ===
Title	Title (Latin) English	Director	Length	Cast	Notes
Подгряване на вчерашния обед	Warming Up Yesterday's Lunch	Kostadin Bonev			Entered into the 25th Moscow International Film Festival

=== 2003 ===
Title	Title (Latin) English	Director	Length	Cast	Notes
	Alien Hunter	Ron Krauss	92 min	James Spader, Leslie Stefanson, Carl Lewis, Nikolay Binev	also partly filmed in USA

=== 2004 ===
Title	Title (Latin) English	Director	Length	Cast	Notes
Мила от Марс	Mila ot Mars; Mila from Mars	Zornitsa Sophia			drama
	The Volcano Disaster	Mark Roper		Chris William Martin, Antonella Elia, Sara Malakul Lane	direct to video thriller

=== 2005 ===
Title	Title (Latin) English	Director	Length	Cast	Notes
Откраднати очи	Stolen Eyes	Radoslav Spassov			Entered into the 27th Moscow International Film Festival

=== 2006 ===
Title	Title (Latin) English	Director	Length	Cast	Notes
	Binka: To Tell a Story About Silence	Elka Nikolova	48 min		documentary on the life of Bulgarian director Binka Zhelyazkova
Разследване	Razsledvane; Investigation	Iglika Trifonova	155 min	Krassimir Dokov, Svetla Yancheva	also filmed in Netherlands and Germany
Маймуни през зимата	Maimuni prez zimata Monkeys in Winter	Milena Andonova			
Пазачът на мъртвите	Pazachat na martvite Warden of the Dead	Ilian Simeonov			

=== 2007 ===
Title	Title (Latin) English	Director	Length	Cast	Notes
	Hitman (2007 film)	Xavier Gens		Timothy Olyphant, Dougray Scott, Robert Knepper, Olga Kurylenko	also filmed in USA, UK and Russia

=== 2008 ===
Title	Title (Latin) English	Director	Length	Cast	Notes
Светът е голям и спасение дебне отвсякъде	Svetat e golyam i spasenie debne otvsyakade The World is Big and Salvation Lurks Around the Corner	Stefan Komandarev	105 min	Miki Manojlović, Carlo Ljubek, Hristo Mutafchiev, Ana Papadopulu	also filmed in Slovenia, Germany and Hungary
Дзифт	Dzift; Zift	Javor Gardev	92 min	Zahari Baharov, Tanya Ilieva, Vladimir Penev, Mihail Mutafov, Đoko Rosić	B&W; 30th Moscow International Film Festival: Silver George for Best Director, Best Film Prize of the Russian Film Clubs Federation
Приключено по давност	Priklyucheno po davnost Closed by Prescription	Malina Petrova			

=== 2009 ===
Title	Title (Latin) English	Director	Length	Cast	Notes
Източни пиеси	Eastern Plays	Kamen Kalev	83 min	Hristo Hristov, Ovanes Torosyan, Saadet Işıl Aksoy, Nikolina Yancheva	4 awards
	The Hills Run Red (2009 film)	Dave Parker	81 min	Sophie Monk, Tad Hilgenbrink, William Sadler, Janet Montgomery	also filmed in USA
