= Lyubomir Neikov =

Bulgarian comedian and actor (born 1972)

- Любомир Нейков
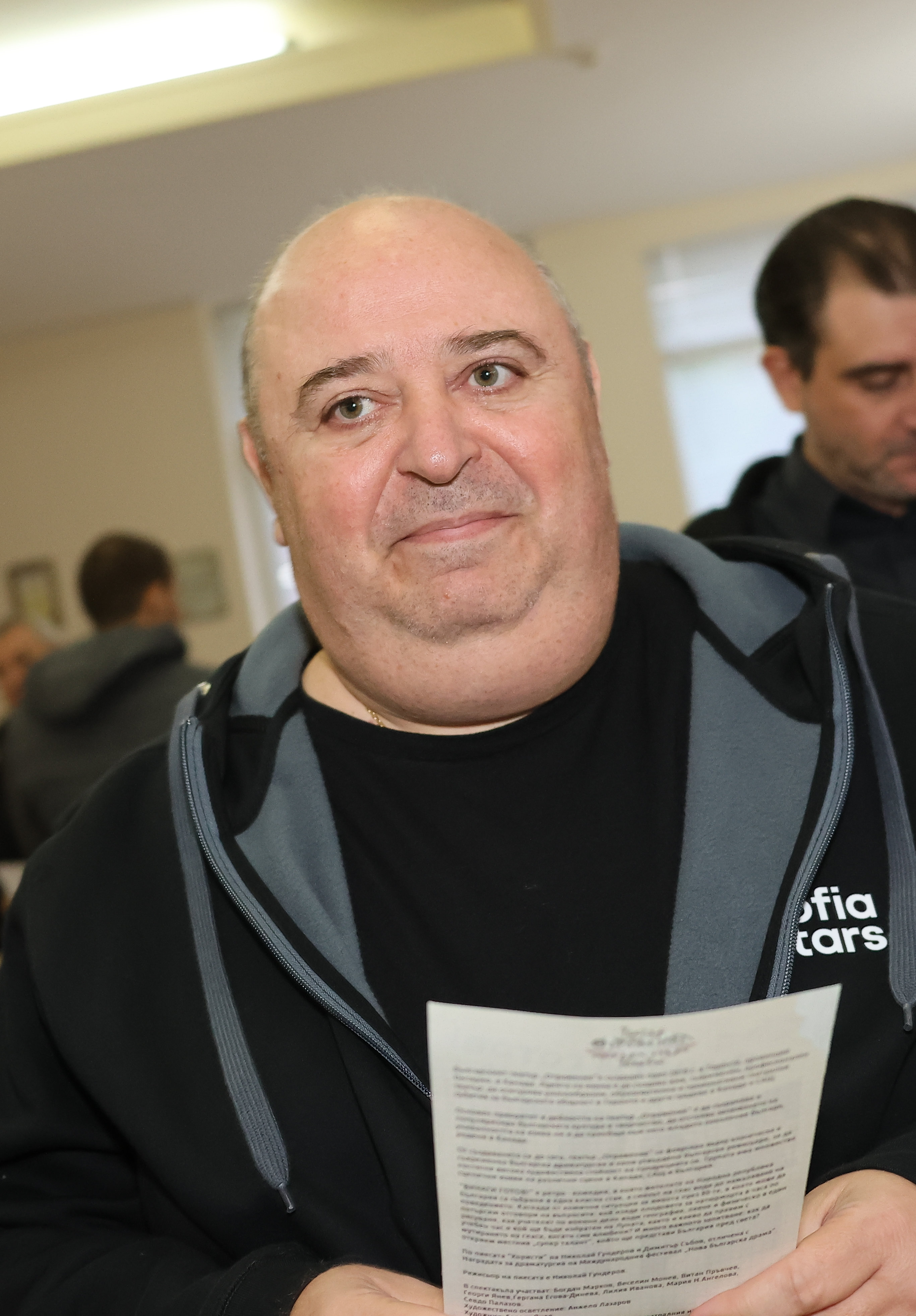
- Lyubomir Neikov
- Born: February 7, 1972 (age 53); Cherven Bryag, Bulgaria
- Occupation(s): comedian, actor

Lyubomir Neikov (Bulgarian: Любомир Нейков; is a Bulgarian comedian and actor.

== Education and Career ==
He is known for his work on television and in theatre. He graduated from the Technical School of electrical engineering and later he graduated from NATFIZ in 1998, specializing in Doll Acting. In 1998 he started working on Slavi's Show, where he was part of "The Actor Trio" together with Krasi Radkov and Viktor Kalev. He portrayed many different characters on the show, including The MC Pharaoh and Bate Boiko. In 2006 he quit the show and the trio disintegrated. In 2007 he started his own show named "Komitsite" (Bulgarian:"Комиците") ("The Comedians" - in English) with the famous Bulgarian actors Hristo Garbov, Chrastio Lafazanov and Ruslan Maynov. This show is in competition with Slavi's Show - the same show where Neykov worked before.

Neikov played the role of Omar Sharif in the 2008 political satire War, Inc., starring John Cusack, Marisa Tomei, Hilary Duff, Ben Kingsley and Dan Aykroyd.

== Filmography ==
Year	Title	Role	Notes
2001-2004	Slavi's Show	Himself	TV show (4 episodes)
2004	Spartacus	Cook	
2006	Investigation	Cheaf of garage	TV movie
2007	Finding Rin Tin Tin	Train station Policeman	
2008	War Inc.	Omar Sharif	
2010	Mission London	Kosta Banicharov	
2011	Great Bulgaria	Various character	12 episodes
2011-presents	Sofia Residents in Excess	Rangel Chekanov	Main Cast (123 episodes)
2014	Autómata	Poot	
2014	Prelyubodeyanie	Mr. Pandzis	
2016	Plebs	Cato	Episode: ''The New Master''
2016	Hristo	Owner of storage	
