= Alexander Voronov =

Bulgarian actor, primarily known for voice acting

- Born: March 8, 1971 (age 55); Pleven, Bulgaria
- Occupation: Actor
- Years active: 1985-present

Alexander Stefanov Voronov (Bulgarian: Александър Стефанов Воронов) (born March 8, 1971) is a Bulgarian actor. He is best known for his voice-over roles in famous television series like Perfect Strangers, Step by Step, ER, The Sopranos, Malcolm in the Middle and Ugly Betty, the animated feature film Aladdin, when he voiced the main character in the same name.

Voronov is the son of the singer Stefan Voronov (1945-1974) and the actress Margarita Pehlivanova.

He graduated from The National School for Ancient Languages and Cultures "Constantine-Cyril the Philosopher"

In 1994, he graduated from VITIZ with a degree in acting in Nadezhda Seikova's class.

== Acting career ==
From 1992-1997 Voronov worked on the stage of theatre "Nikolay Binev", where his father played twenty years earlier.

== Voice acting career ==
Voronov started voicing films, television series and commercials in 1992, when he was invited in Bulgarian National Television by the dubbing director Maria Popova from BNT 1. It is also the voice of the Radio Energy.

In 2010, he was nominated the Icarus award in the category "Golden Voice" for his work on the TV series Mis adorables vecinos, together with Lybomir Mladenov for the same series and Vasil Binev for Yabancı Damat. Vasil Binev have won the Icarus award.

In 2011, he won the Icarus award in the category "Golden Voice" for his work on the TV series Aquí no hay quien viva, when he was nominated together with Ani Vasileva on the same series and Hristina Ibrishimova for Kavak Yelleri.

He is one of the few actors who played the same role four times, namely that of J.T. Lambert of the four Bulgarian dubbings of Step by Step from BNT, Ars Digital Studio, TV7 and VMS.
