= Binev =

Binev may refer to:

- Nikolay Binev, Bulgarian actor
- Slavcho Binev (b. 1965), Bulgarian actor
- Vasil Binev (b. 1957), Bulgarian actor
- Binev, Iran, a city in East Azerbaijan Province, Iran
