= List of Sofia Residents in Excess episodes =

This is a list of episodes of TV series Sofia Residents in Excess with the original dates of broadcasting in Bulgaria on bTV channel. All of the times shown below are UTC+02:00 (local time).

== Broadcast and episodes ==
=== Original broadcast ===
Season	Time slot	TV Season	Episodes	Premiere	Final	Duration
1	Wednesday, 21:00 (UTC+02:00)	2011 (Spring)	10	March 23, 2011	May 25, 2011	45 minutes (free ads)
2	Wednesday, 21:00 (UTC+02:00)	2011 (Fall)	13	September 28, 2011	December 21, 2011	45 minutes (free ads)
3	Wednesday, 21:00 (UTC+02:00)	2012 (Spring)	14	March 7, 2012	June 6, 2012	45 minutes (free ads)
4	Wednesday, 21:00 (UTC+02:00)	2012 (Fall)	14	September 19, 2012	December 19, 2012	45 minutes (free ads)
5	Wednesday, 21:00 (UTC+02:00)	2013 (Spring)	14	March 13, 2013	June 12, 2013	45 minutes (free ads)
6	Wednesday, 21:00 (UTC+02:00)	2013 (Fall)	14	September 18, 2013	December 18, 2013	45 minutes (free ads)
7	Wednesday, 21:30 (UTC+02:00)	2014 (Spring)	13	March 5, 2014	May 28, 2014	45 minutes (free ads)
8	Friday, 21:30 (UTC+02:00)	2015 (Spring)	13	March 6, 2015	May 29, 2015	45 minutes (free ads)
9	Friday, 21:30 (UTC+02:00)	2015 (Fall)	13	September 25, 2015	December 18, 2015	45 minutes (free ads)
10	Friday, 21:30 (UTC+02:00)	2016 (Spring)	13	March 11, 2016	June 3, 2016	45 minutes (free ads)
11	Friday, 21:00 (UTC+02:00)	2017 (Spring)	13	March 10, 2017	June 2, 2017	45 minutes (free ads)
12	Friday, 21:00 (UTC+02:00)	2018 (Spring)		March 2, 2018	June, 2018	45 minutes (free ads)

=== Season 1 ===
Synopsis:

Broadcast	Episode	Rate	Duration
23.03.2011, 21:00-22:00	01	29.36	45 minutes
30.03.2011, 21:00-22:00	02	N/A	45 minutes
06.04.2011, 21:00-22:00	03	N/A	45 minutes
13.04.2011, 21:00-22:00	04	N/A	45 minutes
20.04.2011, 21:00-22:00	05	N/A	45 minutes
27.04.2011, 21:00-22:00	06	N/A	45 minutes
04.05.2011, 21:00-22:00	07	N/A	45 minutes
11.05.2011, 21:00-22:00	08	N/A	45 minutes
18.05.2011, 21:00-22:00	09	N/A	45 minutes
25.05.2011, 21:00-22:00	10	N/A	45 minutes

=== Season 2 ===
Synopsis:

Broadcast	Episode	Rate	Duration
28.09.2011, 21:00-22:00	01	20.96	45 minutes
05.10.2011, 21:00-22:00	02	N/A	45 minutes
12.10.2011, 21:00-22:00	03	N/A	45 minutes
19.10.2011, 21:00-22:00	04	N/A	45 minutes
26.10.2011, 21:00-22:00	05	N/A	45 minutes
02.11.2011, 21:00-22:00	06	N/A	45 minutes
09.11.2011, 21:00-22:00	07	N/A	45 minutes
16.11.2011, 21:00-22:00	08	N/A	45 minutes
23.11.2011, 21:00-22:00	09	N/A	45 minutes
30.11.2011, 21:00-22:00	10	N/A	45 minutes
07.12.2011, 21:00-22:00	11	N/A	45 minutes
14.12.2011, 21:00-22:00	12	N/A	45 minutes
21.12.2011, 21:00-22:00	13	N/A	45 minutes

=== Season 3 ===
Synopsis:

Broadcast	Episode	Rate	Duration
07.03.2012, 21:00-22:00	01	N/A	45 minutes
14.03.2012, 21:00-22:00	02	N/A	45 minutes
21.03.2012, 21:00-22:00	03	N/A	45 minutes
28.03.2012, 21:00-22:00	04	N/A	45 minutes
04.04.2012, 21:00-22:00	05	N/A	45 minutes
11.04.2012, 21:00-22:00	06	N/A	45 minutes
18.04.2012, 21:00-22:00	07	N/A	45 minutes
25.04.2012, 21:00-22:00	08	N/A	45 minutes
02.05.2012, 21:00-22:00	09	N/A	45 minutes
09.05.2012, 21:00-22:00	10	N/A	45 minutes
16.05.2012, 21:00-22:00	11	N/A	45 minutes
23.05.2012, 21:00-22:00	12	N/A	45 minutes
30.05.2012, 21:00-22:00	13	N/A	45 minutes
06.06.2012, 21:00-22:00	14	23.6	45 minutes

=== Season 4 ===
Synopsis:

Broadcast	Episode	Rate	Duration
19.09.2012, 21:00-22:00	01	N/A	45 minutes
26.09.2012, 21:00-22:00	02	N/A	45 minutes
03.10.2012, 21:00-22:00	03	N/A	45 minutes
10.10.2012, 21:00-22:00	04	N/A	45 minutes
17.10.2012, 21:00-22:00	05	N/A	45 minutes
24.10.2012, 21:00-22:00	06	N/A	45 minutes
31.10.2012, 21:00-22:00	07	N/A	45 minutes
07.11.2012, 21:00-22:00	08	N/A	45 minutes
14.11.2012, 21:00-22:00	09	N/A	45 minutes
21.11.2012, 21:00-22:00	10	N/A	45 minutes
28.11.2012, 21:00-22:00	11	N/A	45 минути
05.12.2012, 21:00-22:00	12	N/A	45 minutes
12.12.2012, 21:00-22:00	13	N/A	45 minutes
19.12.2012, 21:00-22:00	14	N/A	45 minutes

=== Season 5 ===
Synopsis:

Broadcast	Episode	Rate	Duration
13.03.2013, 21:00-22:00	01	16.79	45 minutes
20.03.2013, 21:00-22:00	02	N/A	45 minutes
27.03.2013, 21:00-22:00	03	N/A	45 minutes
03.04.2013, 21:00-22:00	04	N/A	45 minutes
10.04.2013, 21:00-22:00	05	N/A	45 minutes
17.04.2013, 21:00-22:00	06	N/A	45 minutes
24.04.2013, 21:00-22:00	07	N/A	45 minutes
01.05.2013, 21:00-22:00	08	N/A	45 minutes
08.05.2013, 21:00-22:00	09	N/A	45 minutes
15.05.2013, 21:00-22:00	10	N/A	45 minutes
22.05.2013, 21:00-22:00	11	N/A	45 minutes
29.05.2013, 21:00-22:00	12	N/A	45 minutes
05.06.2013, 21:00-22:00	13	N/A	45 minutes
12.06.2013, 21:00-22:00	14	N/A	45 minutes

=== Season 6 ===
Synopsis:

Broadcast	Episode	Rate	Duration
18.09.2013, 21:00-22:00	01	N/A	45 minutes
25.09.2013, 21:00-22:00	02	N/A	45 minutes
02.10.2013, 21:00-22:00	03	N/A	45 minutes
09.10.2013, 21:00-22:00	04	N/A	45 minutes
16.10.2013, 21:00-22:00	05	N/A	45 minutes
23.10.2013, 21:00-22:00	06	N/A	45 minutes
30.10.2013, 21:00-22:00	07	N/A	45 minutes
06.11.2013, 21:00-22:00	08	N/A	45 minutes
13.11.2013, 21:00-22:00	09	N/A	45 minutes
20.11.2013, 21:00-22:00	10	N/A	45 minutes
27.11.2013, 21:00-22:00	11	N/A	45 minutes
04.12.2013, 21:00-22:00	12	N/A	45 minutes
11.12.2013, 21:00-22:00	13	N/A	45 minutes
18.12.2013, 21:00-22:00	14	N/A	45 minutes

=== Season 7 ===
Synopsis:

Broadcast	Episode	Rate	Duration
05.03.2014, 21:30-22:30	01	N/A	45 minutes
12.03.2014, 21:30-22:30	02	N/A	45 minutes
19.03.2014, 21:30-22:30	03	N/A	45 minutes
26.03.2014, 21:30-22:30	04	N/A	45 minutes
02.04.2014, 21:30-22:30	05	N/A	45 minutes
09.04.2014, 21:30-22:30	06	N/A	45 minutes
16.04.2014, 21:30-22:30	07	N/A	45 minutes
23.04.2014, 21:30-22:30	08	N/A	45 minutes
30.04.2014, 21:30-22:30	09	N/A	45 minutes
07.05.2014, 21:30-22:30	10	N/A	45 minutes
14.05.2014, 21:30-22:30	11	N/A	45 minutes
21.05.2014, 21:30-22:30	12	N/A	45 minutes
28.05.2014, 21:30-22:30	13	N/A	45 minutes

=== Season 8 ===
Synopsis:

Broadcast	Episode	Rate	Duration
06.03.2015, 21:30-22:30	01	N/A	45 minutes
13.03.2015, 21:30-22:30	02	N/A	45 minutes
20.03.2015, 21:30-22:30	03	N/A	45 minutes
27.03.2015, 21:30-22:30	04	N/A	45 minutes
03.04.2015, 21:30-22:30	05	N/A	45 minutes
10.04.2015, 21:30-22:30	06	N/A	45 minutes
17.04.2015, 21:30-22:30	07	N/A	45 minutes
24.04.2015, 21:30-22:30	08	N/A	45 minutes
01.05.2015, 21:30-22:30	09	N/A	45 minutes
08.05.2015, 21:30-22:30	10	N/A	45 minutes
15.05.2015, 21:30-22:30	11	N/A	45 minutes
22.05.2015, 21:30-22:30	12	N/A	45 minutes
29.05.2015, 21:30-22:30	13	N/A	45 minutes

=== Season 9 ===
Synopsis:

Broadcast	Episode	Rating	Duration
25.09.2015, 21:30-22:30	01	N/A	45 minutes
02.10.2015, 21:30-22:30	02	N/A	45 minutes
09.10.2015, 21:30-22:30	03	N/A	45 minutes
16.10.2015, 21:30-22:30	04	N/A	45 minutes
23.10.2015, 21:30-22:30	05	N/A	45 minutes
30.10.2015, 21:30-22:30	06	N/A	45 minutes
06.11.2015, 21:30-22:30	07	N/A	45 minutes
13.11.2015, 21:30-22:30	08	N/A	45 minutes
20.11.2015, 21:30-22:30	09	N/A	45 minutes
27.11.2015, 21:30-22:30	10	N/A	45 minutes
04.12.2015, 21:30-22:30	11	N/A	45 minutes
11.12.2015, 21:30-22:30	12	N/A	45 minutes
18.12.2015, 21:30-22:30	13	N/A	45 minutes

=== Season 10 ===
Synopsis:

Broadcast	Episode	Rating	Duration
11.03.2016, 21:30-22:30	01	N/A	45 minutes
18.03.2016, 21:30-22:30	02	N/A	45 minutes
25.03.2016, 21:30-22:30	03	N/A	45 minutes
01.04.2016, 21:30-22:30	04	N/A	45 minutes
08.04.2016, 21:30-22:30	05	N/A	45 minutes
15.04.2016, 21:30-22:30	06	N/A	45 minutes
22.04.2016, 21:30-22:30	07	N/A	45 minutes
29.04.2016, 21:30-22:30	08	N/A	45 minutes
06.05.2016, 21:30-22:30	09	N/A	45 minutes
13.05.2016, 21:30-22:30	10	N/A	45 minutes
20.05.2016, 21:30-22:30	11	N/A	45 minutes
27.05.2016, 21:30-22:30	12	N/A	45 minutes
03.06.2016, 21:30-22:30	13	N/A	45 minutes

=== Season 11 ===
Synopsis:

Broadcast	Episode	Rating	Duration
10.03.2017, 21:00-22:00	01	N/A	45 minutes
17.03.2017, 21:00-22:00	02	N/A	45 minutes
24.03.2017, 21:00-22:00	03	N/A	45 minutes
31.03.2017, 21:00-22:00	04	N/A	45 minutes
07.04.2017, 21:00-22:00	05	N/A	45 minutes
14.04.2017, 21:00-22:00	06	N/A	45 minutes
21.04.2017, 21:00-22:00	07	N/A	45 minutes
28.04.2017, 21:00-22:00	08	N/A	45 minutes
05.05.2017, 21:00-22:00	09	N/A	45 minutes
12.05.2017, 21:00-22:00	10	N/A	45 minutes
19.05.2017, 21:00-22:00	11	N/A	45 minutes
26.05.2017, 21:00-22:00	12	N/A	45 minutes
02.06.2017, 21:00-22:00	13	N/A	45 minutes

=== Season 12 ===
Synopsis:
