= Stoyanka Mutafova =

Bulgarian actress (1922–2019)

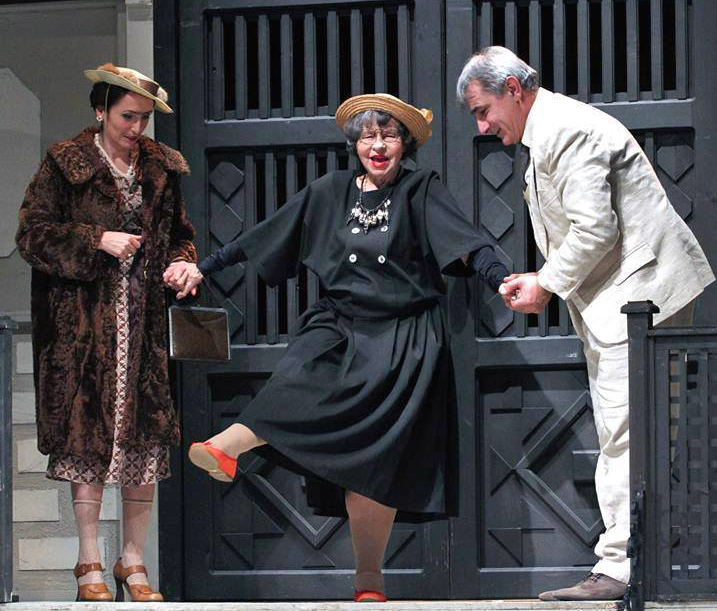
- Mutafova performing in the play Grasshoppers in 2015
- Born: Stoyana-Maria Konstantinova Mutafova; 2 February 1922; Sofia, Kingdom of Bulgaria
- Died: 6 December 2019 (aged 97); Sofia, Bulgaria
- Occupation: Actress
- Years active: 1946–2019
- Children: 1

Stoyanka Mutafova (Bulgarian: Стоянка Мутафова; 2 February 1922 – 6 December 2019) was a Bulgarian actress. During her career, she starred in over 53 theatrical plays and 25 films

Nicknamed Ms. Natural Disaster for a play she performed in and The Queen of Bulgarian comedy, she was an official applicant for a Guinness Book of World Record as the actress with the longest active professional career. At the age of 94 in 2016, she toured the theater halls in major cities of the United States, Canada, the Netherlands, Switzerland, Great Britain and Germany.

== Biography ==
Born in Sofia, she graduated from the University of Sofia with a degree in classical philology. Later, she studied acting in Bulgaria and Prague. From 1949 until 1956 she acted in multiple plays in the "Ivan Vazov" national theatre. She co-founded the Aleko Konstantinov Theatre, where she performed from 1957 to 1991. In 2005, she starred alongside Georgi Kaloyanchev in the play The Astronauts.

She died at the age of 97 on December 6, 2019, as a result of sepsis and pneumonia, brought on by necrosis of the gallbladder.

== Filmography ==
- Item One (1956)
- Lyubimetz 13 (1958)
- Spetzialist po vsichko (1962) as the Hairdresser
- Dzhesi Dzeyms sreshtu Lokum Shekerov (1966) as Lokum's wife
- The Tied Up Balloon (1967)
- Byalata staya (1968) as Rina's Mother
- The Bandit (1969)
- Whale (1970) as Grandma Stoyna
- Ezop (1970) as Casandra
- Byagstvo v Ropotamo (1973) .... Gypsy
- Nako, Dako and Tsako (1974)
- Temnata Koria (1977)
- Toplo (1978)
- Patilansko tsarstvo (1980)
- Bash maystorat nachalnik (1983)
- Naslednicata (1984)
- Bronzoviyat klyuch (1984) as Samsarova
- Federatziya na dinastronavtite (1984) - TV Series
- Pantudi (1993)
- Golemite igri (1999) .... Moni's Grandma
- Stakleni topcheta (1999) .... Albena's Mother
- Rapsodiya v byalo (2002) .... Old lady
- Sofia Residents in Excess (2011-2018) - TV Series
