= Binka: To Tell a Story About Silence =

- Бинка. Да разкажеш приказка за мълчанието
- Directed by: Elka Nikolova
- Written by: Elka Nikolova
- Produced by: Stanimir Trifonov
- Cinematography: Christo Bakalov; Vanyo Georgiev
- Music by: Rumen Boyadzhiev
- Production company: Vreme Film Studio
- Release date: 2006
- Running time: 48 minutes
- Country: Bulgaria
- Language: Bulgarian

Binka: To Tell a Story About Silence (Bulgarian Бинка. Да разкажеш приказка за мълчанието) is a 2006 documentary film directed by Elka Nikolova. It is 48 minutes in length, and was released in Bulgaria in 2006 and in the United States in 2007.

The topic of the film is the life and struggles of Bulgaria's first female film director Binka Zhelyazkova during difficult times politically. The documentary premiered in New York, at the Museum of Modern Art, on April 4, 2007. Later it was shown at many venues such as the Russian Cultural Center In Houston, Texas, Brave Festival in Wrocław, and was also shown at the 2007 South East European Film Festival in Los Angeles, California where it won the Audience Award for best documentary film; it won the award for Best Debut Film at the 2007 Golden Rython Festival for Nonfeature Films; and was also featured in Montreal, Quebec's International Festival of Films on Art.

The film is archived in the Bulgarian National Film Center.
