= 100 Kila =

100 Kila 100 Кила
- Born: Yavor Dimitrov Yanakiev; Varna, Bulgaria
- Origin: Bulgaria
- Genre: Hip hop
- Occupations: Rapper, DJ, actor
- Instrument: Vocals
- Years active: 2002–present
- Labels: Jabulah; Facing The Sun; R&B Records; Virginia
- Website: 100kila.store

Yavor Dimitrov Yanakiev (Bulgarian: Явор Димитров Янакиев), better known by his stage name 100 Kila (Bulgarian: 100 Кила; also stylized as 100KILA), is a Bulgarian rapper, actor, songwriter and entrepreneur from Varna. His stage name is a short form of the phrase "100 kilograms" in Bulgarian.

== Biography ==
=== Early life ===
Yanakiev was born and raised in a Romani neighborhood of concentrated poverty in Asparuhovo, Varna. He lived with his parents and brother, until their father left them. In the mid 90s his mother moved to Greece, in hopes of sustaining her family and to encourage Yavor's education. His parents separated when he was 6. Yavor subsequently moved to his grandmother's home in Targovishte where he studied in school until the 8th grade, before eventually dropping out due to absence and low grades.

=== Career ===
In the early 2000s, Yanakiev started his musical career after meeting prominent Bulgarian rapper Big Sha. He was immediately signed to his record label R&B Records and enjoyed several successful years in the label alongside several other artists such as Vanko 1, Konsa, Gumeni Glavi and Loshite. He also achieved great notoriety with the singles "Vav kluba" featuring Consa and "Chiki-Na-Na" by Gumeni Glavi respectively. He also featured on the Big Sha songs "Ritam basov" (Bass rhythm) and "Kukite me debnat" (The cops are onto me).

Yanakiev also participated in the first season of the Bulgarian version of the show The Mole. He also shot 1 episode for the Bulgarian TV Series Domashen Arest (House Arrest) in 2013. In 2015 he joined Sofia Residents in Excess cast for season 9.

On April 9, 2016, 100 Kila released a remix version of the song "Babuli Jabulah" from his 2013 album ZLA10 as a single featuring American rapper Rick Ross.

== Discography ==
=== Singles ===
Year	Title	Peak chart positions	Album
Year	Title	BUL	Album
2013	"Slivenskiat Kashkaval"	40	—N/a
2013	"Moeto Radio" (feat. Magi Djanavarova)	16	ZLA10
2013	"Chujdi Grehove"	33	ZLA10
2013	"Az sam 6"	4	ZLA10
2015	"100 Gaidi"	14	—N/a
2016	"Babuli Jabulah" (feat. Rick Ross)	TBA	—N/a
2017	"Well Paid"	17	—N/a
2019	" EL TRAFICANTE "	6	—N/a

=== Albums ===
- По-добре гаден, отколкото гладен (2003)
- Прехода на Просветения (2009)
- ZLA10 (2013)

== Filmography ==
Television
Year	Title	Role	Notes
2013	House Arrest	Zara's boyfriend	Special Guest Star; 1 episode
2013	The Mole Bulgaria	Himself	
2015	Sofia Residents in Excess	Tsanko	Special Guest Star; Season 9
