= Silvia Lulcheva =

Bulgarian actress

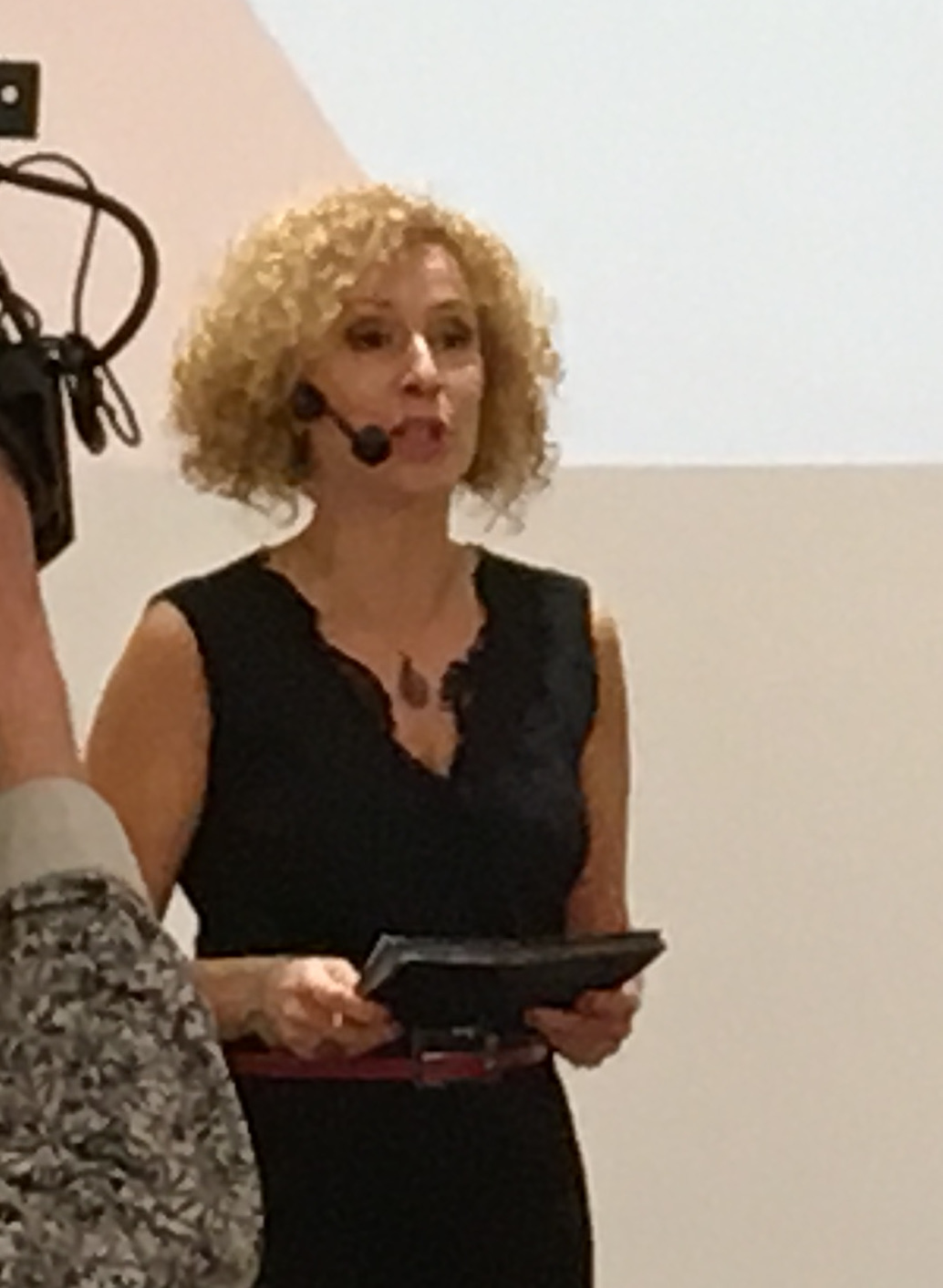
- Born: Silvia Krasteva Lulcheva; August 28, 1969 (age 55); Sofia, Bulgaria
- Occupation: Actress
- Years active: 1991-present

Silvia Krasteva Lulcheva (Bulgarian: Силвия Кръстева Лулчева) (born August 28, 1969) is a Bulgarian actress. She is known for her role as Slavka Lyutova on the bTV series Sofia Residents in Excess (2011–2019), as well as for her voice over roles in famous television series and films.

== Biography ==
Lulcheva is born in August 28, 1969 in Sofia.

In 1992, Lulcheva graduated from VITIZ (National Academy for Theatre and Film Arts), with a degree in acting from Stefan Danailov's class.

== Acting career ==
After graduation she joined the "Nikolay Binev" Youth Theater from 1992 to 2018.

She starred in some Bulgarian movies and series, including the Bulgarian comedy-drama series Sofia Residents in Excess and the Bulgarian drama feature film A Dose of Happiness.

== Voice acting career ==
She started dubbing films and television series into Bulgarian from 1994. Her most popular character dubbed in Bulgarian is Carrie Bradshaw in the HBO series Sex and the City (1998–2004), portrayed by Sarah Jessica Parker.

Other productions which she has dubbed into Bulgarian include the American TV series are: Married... with Children (bTV dub), Grace Under Fire (NOVA dub), CSI: Miami, Cold Case, Rules of Engagement, The Tudors, Frasier, Band of Brothers, Cashmere Mafia, Lipstick Jungle. the Mexican telenovela La viuda de Blanco, the Greek series Lampsi and the Brazilian telenovela O Clone, the American animated series Stuart Little: The Animated Series and The Flintstones, the German animated series Simsala Grimm and Italian animated series Winx Club.

In 2004, Lulcheva won the Icarus award in the category "Golden Voice" for her work on the TV series Married... with Children and Sex and the City.

== Personal life ==
She was married at the age of 23 years and later divorced. In 1997 Lulcheva began a relationship with the actor Vasil Binev. They have a daughter, Elitsa.

== Filmography ==
Films
Year	Title	Original title	Role	Notes
2002	Mrs. Dinosaur	Госпожа Динозавър	Rich Lady	Bulgarian children's film
2008	Une femme à abattre	-	Tamara	French film
2012	Yellow Dog	Жълто куче	The Publisher	Bulgarian short film
2019	A Dose of Happiness	Доза щастие	The Mother	Bulgarian drama film
2020	From the Other Side	От другата страна	Maya Ignatova, the Mother	Bulgarian short film (4 episodes)

Television
Year	Title	Original title	Role	Notes
1991	The Lovers	Любовниците	-	In third episode
2005	Patriarchy	Патриархат	Лунга	7 episodes
2010	Clinic on the Third Floor	Клиника на третия етаж	Mrs. Miteva	In 26th episode
2011-2019	Sofia Residents in Excess	Столичани в повече	Slavka Lyutova	156 episodes
