= Sofia Residents in Excess =

- Столичани в повече
- Created by: Evtim Miloshev; Ivan Spasov; Hristina Apostolova
- Starring: Lyubomir Neikov; Albena Pavlova; Silvia Lulcheva; Krustyo Lafazanov; Stoyanka Mutafova; Hristo Garbov; Ivan Yurukov; Nencho Ilchev
- Country of origin: Bulgaria
- Original language: Bulgarian
- No. of seasons: 13
- No. of episodes: 170

Production
- Producers: Dream Team Productions bTV Media Group
- Running time: 45 minutes (no ads)

Original release
- Network: bTV
- Release: 23 March 2011 – 24 May 2019

Sofia Residents in Excess (Bulgarian: Столичани в повече) is a Bulgarian TV comedy-drama series produced by BTV and Dream Team Production that premiered on BTV on 23 March 2011.

== Plot ==
Two families from the Bulgarian capital – Chekanovi (the Chekanovs) and Lyutovi (the Lyutovs) – are in constant competition among each other. They used to live in the outmost metropolitan district of Izvor, but they have moved to central metropolitan district and are real Sofia residents now.

== Cast ==
=== The Chekanov Family (Chekanovi) ===
- Grandma Mariyka Chekanova (Stoyanka Mutafova) - mother of Rangel
- Rangel Chekanov (Lyubomir Neikov) – former mayor of Izvor, former member of the parliament and former caretaker prime minister
- Galabina Chekanova (Albena Pavlova) - wife of Rangel, housewife
- Radko Chekanov (Vasil Draganov) – the son
- Mariya Chekanova/Lyutova (Violeta Markovska) - the daughter, wife of Andrey Lyutov (season 1-4)

=== The Lyutov Family (Lyutovi) ===
- Yordan Lyutov (Krustyo Lafazanov) - husband of Slaveya, former mayor of Izvor
- Slaveya "Slavka" Lyutova (Silvia Lulcheva) - wife of Yordan, former member of the parliament
- Spas Lyutov (Ruslan Maynov) - eldest son of Yordan and Slaveya; former doctor
- Andrey Lyutov (Ivan Jurukov) - son of Yordan and Slaveya; photographer, TV producer
- Yana Lyutova (Mina Markova) - daughter of Yordan and Slaveya
- Yovka Lyutova (Eva Tepavicharova) - wife of Spas Lyutov

=== Other characters ===
- Dominik Strosran (Ivan Radoev)
- Pop Grigoriy - Grishata (Nencho Ilchev) - local priest
- Zoya (Ernestina Shinova) - wife of Plamen Tsekov
- Plamen (Patso) Tsekov (Hristo Garbov), twin brother of Konstantin Tsekov
- Konstantin Tsekov (Hristo Garbov), twin brother of Plamen Tsekov
- Dimo Tsekov (Ivan Panayotov) – son of Plamen Tsekov, accountant
- Petar 'Pepi' Peychev (Petyo Petkov) - friend of Andrey, TV producer
- Eleonora Veron (Evelin Kostova) - dating Andrey Lyutov
- Kameliya (Daniela Stamova) - Eleonora's best friend, dating Pepi

=== Guest stars ===
- Preslava as herself (season 1)
- Georgi Kaloyanchev as Georgi grandma Mariyka first love (season 2)
- Orlin Goranov as Venelin Draganov, writer (season 2)
- Desi Slava as Vyara Toneva, pop singer (season 3)
- Doni as Toni, pop singer (season 4)
- Ralitsa Kovacheva-Bezhan (season 5)
- Daniel Tsochev (season 5)
- Atanas Mihaylov (season 5)
- Hristo Stoichkov as God (season 5)
- Azis as cook in jail (season 7)
- Dimitar Kovachev - Funky as The Kraut, cellmate of Plamen Tsekov (season 7)
- Maria Ilieva as Mariya Skala, opera singer (season 8)
- Blagoy Georgiev - friend of grandma Mariyka (season 9)
- Evgeni Budinov as lawyer (season 9)
- Robert Yanakiev as prosecutor (season 9)
- 100 Kila as Tsanko, student (season 9)
- Hristina Apostolova as Karolina, Macedonian spy (season 9)
- duet Riton as themselves (season 9)
- Lyubo Ganev as Bulgarian Olympic Committee President (season 10)
- Stefan Danailov (season 10)

== Episodes ==
Season	Time slot	TV Season	Episodes	Premiere	Final	Duration
1	Wednesday, 21:00 (UTC+02:00)	2011 (Spring)	10	23 March 2011	25 May 2011	45 minutes (ads free)
2	Wednesday, 21:00 (UTC+02:00)	2011 (Fall)	13	28 September 2011	21 December 2011	45 minutes (ads free)
3	Wednesday, 21:00 (UTC+02:00)	2012 (Spring)	14	7 March 2012	6 June 2012	45 minutes (ads free)
4	Wednesday, 21:00 (UTC+02:00)	2012 (Fall)	14	19 September 2012	19 December 2012	45 minutes (ads free)
5	Wednesday, 21:00 (UTC+02:00)	2013 (Spring)	14	13 March 2013	12 June 2013	45 minutes (ads free)
6	Wednesday, 21:00 (UTC+02:00)	2013 (Fall)	14	18 September 2013	18 December 2013	45 minutes (ads free)
7	Wednesday, 21:30 (UTC+02:00)	2014 (Spring)	13	5 March 2014	28 May 2014	45 minutes (ads free)
8	Friday, 21:30 (UTC+02:00)	2015 (Spring)	13	6 March 2015	29 May 2015	45 minutes (ads free)
9	Friday, 21:30 (UTC+02:00)	2015 (Fall)	13	25 September 2015	December 2015	45 minutes (ads free)
10	Friday, 21:30 (UTC+02:00)	2016 (Spring)	13	11 March 2016	3 June 2016	45 minutes (ads free)
11	Friday, 21:00 (UTC+02:00)	2017 (Spring)	13	10 March 2017	2 June 2017	45 minutes (ads free)
12	Friday, 21:00 (UTC+02:00)	2018 (Spring)		2 March 2018	June 2018	45 minutes (ads free)

== Official website ==
- Sofia Residents in Excess at IMDb
- Official website on BTV (Bulgarian)
- Sofia Residents in Excess on voyo.bg (Bulgarian)
