= Ruslan Maynov =

Bulgarian actor and singer (born 1976)

Ruslan Maynov Руслан Мъйнов
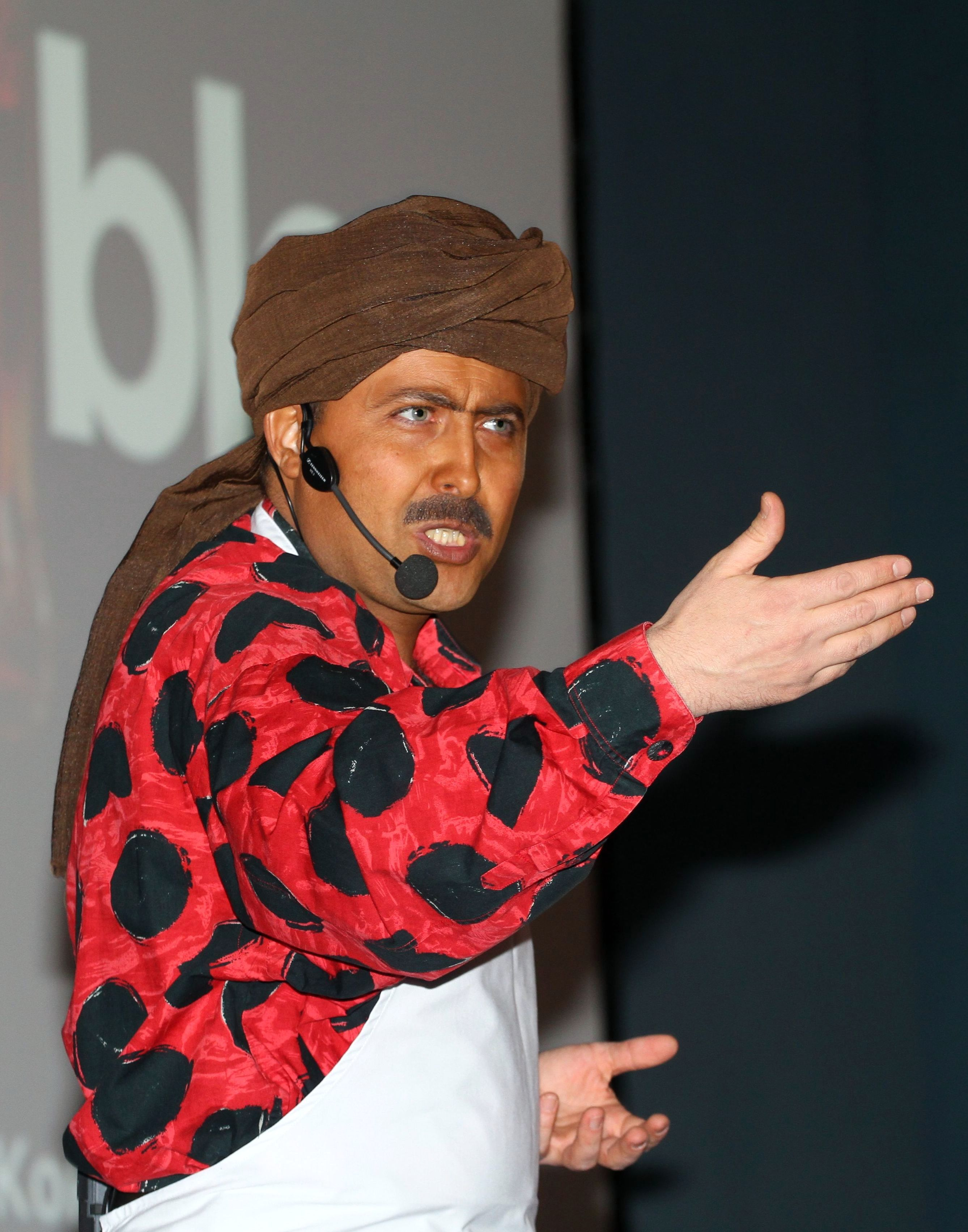

Background information
- Born: 15 November 1976 (age 48); Izmail, Ukrainian SSR, Soviet Union
- Origin: Ukraine, Bulgaria
- Genres: Pop-folk Folk
- Occupation(s): Actor, Singer, songwriter
- Instrument: Vocals
- Years active: 1994–present

Ruslan Maynov (Bulgarian: Руслан Мъйнов; born 15 November 1976) is a Bulgarian actor and singer of Bessarabian Bulgarian origin.

== Biography ==
Maynov was born in Izmail in the region of Bessarabia, Ukrainian SSR (now Ukraine) to a Bulgarian family. He moved to Bulgaria in 1994; he graduated from NATFIZ in 1998 and started working with Slavi Trifonov on his TV shows Hashove and Slavi's Show. He was also a host of Gospodari na efira. In 2007, he joined up with fellow actors Lyubomir Neykov, Krastyo Lafazanov and Hristo Garbov and launched Komitsite (The Comedians), a stand-up comedy show aired on bTV on Friday evening.

Television aside, Maynov has also participated in a number of theatrical plays and has released five music albums.

Discography:

- Руслан Mъйнов Пее Любими Руски Песни (2014)
- Българско Хоро (2017)
