= Stolen Life (Bulgarian TV series) =

- Откраднат живот
- Genre: Drama; Medical
- Created by: Evtim Miloshev
- Written by: Hristina Apostolova; Ivan Spasov; Evtim Miloshev; Angel Nakov; Zdrava Kamenova; Svetoslav Tomov; Alexander Spasov; Boryana Mihaylova (Petkova); Elena Ermova; Stanislav Grozdanov
- Directed by: Zornitsa Sofia; Peter Valchanov; Pavel Vesnakov; Dimitar Dimitrov; Nikolai Kostov
- Starring: Maria Kavardjikova; Yanina Kasheva; Ioana Bukovska-Davidova; Emil Markov; Dimo Aleksiev; Ralitsa Paskaleva; Daria Simeonova
- Country of origin: Bulgaria
- Original language: Bulgarian
- No. of seasons: 11
- No. of episodes: 507

Production
- Executive producer: Dream Team Films
- Producer: Nova Broadcasting Group
- Cinematography: Boris Slavkov; Martin Balkanski; Martin Dimitrov; Vladimir Zahariev
- Running time: 45 minutes

Original release
- Network: NOVA
- Release: 8 March 2016 – 20 May 2021

Stolen Life (Bulgarian: Откраднат живот) is a Bulgarian medical drama series that airs on NOVA, created by Evtim Miloshev directed by Zornitsa Sofia and Peter Valchanov and produced by Alexander Hristov, Evtim Miloshev, Gabriel Georgiev and Ivan Spassov. Participating actors are Stoyan Alexiev, Maria Kavardjikova, Alexander Alexiev, Ianina Kasheva, Ioana Bukovska-Davidova, Emil Markov, Radina Dumanyan, Dimo Alexiev, Vasil Banov, Martina Vachkova, Milena Jivkova and others.

== Series overview ==
| Season | Timeslot | TV Season | Episodes | Premiere | Final |
|---|---|---|---|---|---|
| 1 | Tuesday-Thursday, 8:00 pm | 2016 (Spring) | 42 | 8 March 2016 | 2 June 2016 |
| 2 | Tuesday-Thursday, 9:00 pm Tuesday-Wednesday, 9:00 pm (from episodes 64 to 67) | 2016 (Autumn) | 39 | 13 September 2016 | 14 December 2016 |
| 3 | Monday-Friday, 8:00 pm (from episodes 82 to 86); Tuesday-Friday, 8:00 pm (from episodes 87 to 138) | 2017 (Spring) | 57 | 20 February 2017 | 26 May 2017 |
| 4 | Monday-Friday, 8:00 pm (from episodes 186 to 190); Tuesday-Friday, 8:00 pm (from episodes 139 to 154, from episodes 182 to 185); Tuesday-Thursday, 8:00 pm (from episodes 155 to 181) | 2017 (Autumn) | 52 | 12 September 2017 | 22 December 2017 |
| 5 | Tuesday-Friday, 8:00 pm | 2018 (Spring) | 52 | 27 February 2018 | 29 May 2018 |
| 6 | Tuesday-Friday, 8:00 pm | 2018 (Autumn) | 52 | 11 September 2018 | 7 December 2018 |
| 7 | Tuesday-Thursday, 8:00 pm | 2019 (Spring) | 39 | 26 February 2019 | 23 May 2019 |
| 8 | Tuesday-Friday, 8:00 pm | 2019 (Autumn) | 52 | 10 September 2019 | 6 December 2019 |
| 9 | Tuesday-Friday, 8:00 pm (from episodes 386 to 401, from episodes 420 to 428); Tuesday-Thursday, 8:00 pm (from episodes 402 to 419) | 2020 (Spring) | 43 | 25 February 2020 | 22 May 2020 |
| 10 | Tuesday-Thursday, 8:00 pm | 2020 (Autumn) | 39 | 8 September 2020 | 3 December 2020 |
| 11 | Tuesday-Thursday, 8:00 pm | 2021 (Spring) | 39 | 23 February 2021 | 20 May 2021 |

== Cast and characters ==
- Filip Bukov - Dr. Hadzihristev (9-11)
- Evgeni Budinov - Dr. Emil Petmezov (8-11)
- Liubomira Basheva - Dr. Nora Chilingirova (8-11)
- Ivan Yrukov - Dr. Deian Tabakov (7-8)
- Gergana Stoyanova - Dr. Poli Gruncharova (7-11)
- Vladimir Karamazov - Hristo Karagiozov (6-9)
- Vladimir Penev - Prof. Asen Tsonev (6-11)
- Yulian Vergov - Assoc. Prof. Viktor Bankov (4,6-7)
- Dimo Aleksiev - Dr. Kalin Genadiev (1-5,8)
- Maria Kavardzhikova - Evgenia Genadieva (1-8)
- Yanina Kasheva - Dr. Katya Krasteva (1-11)
- Yoana Bukovska-Davidova - Violeta Zaharieva (1-4)
- Emil Markov - Assoc. Prof. Petar Zahariev (1-11)
- Milena Zhivkova-Geraskova - Dr. Elena Romanova (1-11)
- Diana Dimitrova - Dr. Zornitsa Ognyanova (4-11)
- Velislav Pavlov - Dr. Mario Kovachev (5-6,8-11)
- Dimitar Zahariev - Dr. Anton Kovachev (5-6)
- Martina Vachkova - Zhekova (1-11)
- Angelina Slavova - Neneva (1-11)
- Ralitsa Paskaleva - Dr. Galia Stiliyanova (graduate AG) (1-9)
- Daria Simeonova - Nataliya Pavlova (1-5)
- Desislava Bakardzhieva - Dr. Lora Hinova (1-11)
- Monyo Monev - Assoc. Prof. Stefan Mazov (2-11)
- Tsvyatko Tsenov - Miroslav Terziev (1-2)
- Luiza Grigorova - Dr. Vyara Dobreva (3-4)
- Naum Shopov Jr. - Dr. Boris Tasev (3-11)
- Krasimir Dokov - Yanko Vasilev (1-11)
- Aleksandar Aleksiev - Dr. Aleksandar Vasilev (1-3,8)
- Radina Dumanyan - Dr. Bilyana Zaharieva (1-3,8)
- Stoyan Aleksiev - prof. Ivan Genadiev (1-3)
- Vasil Banov - prof. Georgi Kamburov (mentor Dr. Vassilev) (1-3)
- Aleksander Dimov - Dr. Vladov (1-6)
- Nikola Mutafov - Dr. Penev (1-11)
- Daniel Rashev - Dr. Martin Vrabchev (1-11)
- Tsvyatko Tsenov - Miroslav Terziev (1-2)
- Dimitar Rachkov Jr. - Koko (3-11)
- Vasil Binev - Ivo Fotev (5-11)
- Irina Miteva - Ina Foteva (5-7)
- Ernestina Shinova - Dr. Sofia Stamenova (2-10)
- Darin Angelov - Ivan Genadiev (in the 80s)
- Aleksandra Sarchadjieva - Katya Krasteva (in the 80s)
- Evgeni Budinov - Yanko Vasilev (in the 80s)
- Hristina Apostolova - Evgenia Genadieva (in the 80s)
- Joseph Shamli - Dr. Kamburov (in the 80s)

== Broadcast ==
The premiere of TV series in Bulgaria was on 8 March 2016, broadcast from Tuesday to Thursday from 8.00 pm to 9.00 pm on NOVA. The last 3 series are double and broadcast from 20:00 to 22:00. The final was on 2 June. A few days later they begin filming the second season, which began on 13 September with airtime at 21:00 pm. The second season ended on 14 December at 21:00.

The third season began on 20 February 2017 from Monday to Friday from 20:00 to 21:00. On 28 February episodes already broadcast from Tuesday to Friday also at 20:00.
