= The Bandit (1969 film) =

- Italian film poster by Mario De Berardinis
- Directed by: Carlo Lizzani
- Screenplay by: Ugo Pirro; Carlo Lizzani
- Story by: Ugo Pirro
- Based on: L'amante di Gramigna by Giovanni Verga
- Produced by: Dino De Laurentiis
- Starring: Gian Maria Volonté; Stefania Sandrelli; Ivo Garrani; Luigi Pistilli
- Cinematography: Silvano Ippoliti
- Edited by: Franco Fraticelli
- Music by: Otello Profazio
- Production companies: Dino De Laurentiis Cinematografica; Studiya za igralni filmi
- Distributed by: Paramount Pictures
- Release date: 1969
- Running time: 108 minutes
- Countries: Italy; Bulgaria
- Language: Italian

The Bandit (Italian: L'amante di Gramigna, lit. 'The lover of Gramigna') is a 1969 Italian drama film directed by Carlo Lizzani. For this film Stefania Sandrelli was awarded as best actress at the San Sebastián International Film Festival.

== Cast ==
- Gian Maria Volonté as Gramigna
- Stefania Sandrelli as Gemma
- Luigi Pistilli as Ramarro
- Ivo Garrani as Baron Nardò
- Emilia Radeva as mother of Gemma
- Assen Milanov as the notary
- Marian Dimitrov
- Stizio Mazgalov
- Stoyanka Mutafova
- Vassil Popoliev
- Gianni Pulone
- Peter Petrov Slabakov
- Stoian Stoiciev
- Ivan Dimitrov Penkov
