= Vasil Binev =

Bulgarian actor (born 1957)

- Васил Бинев
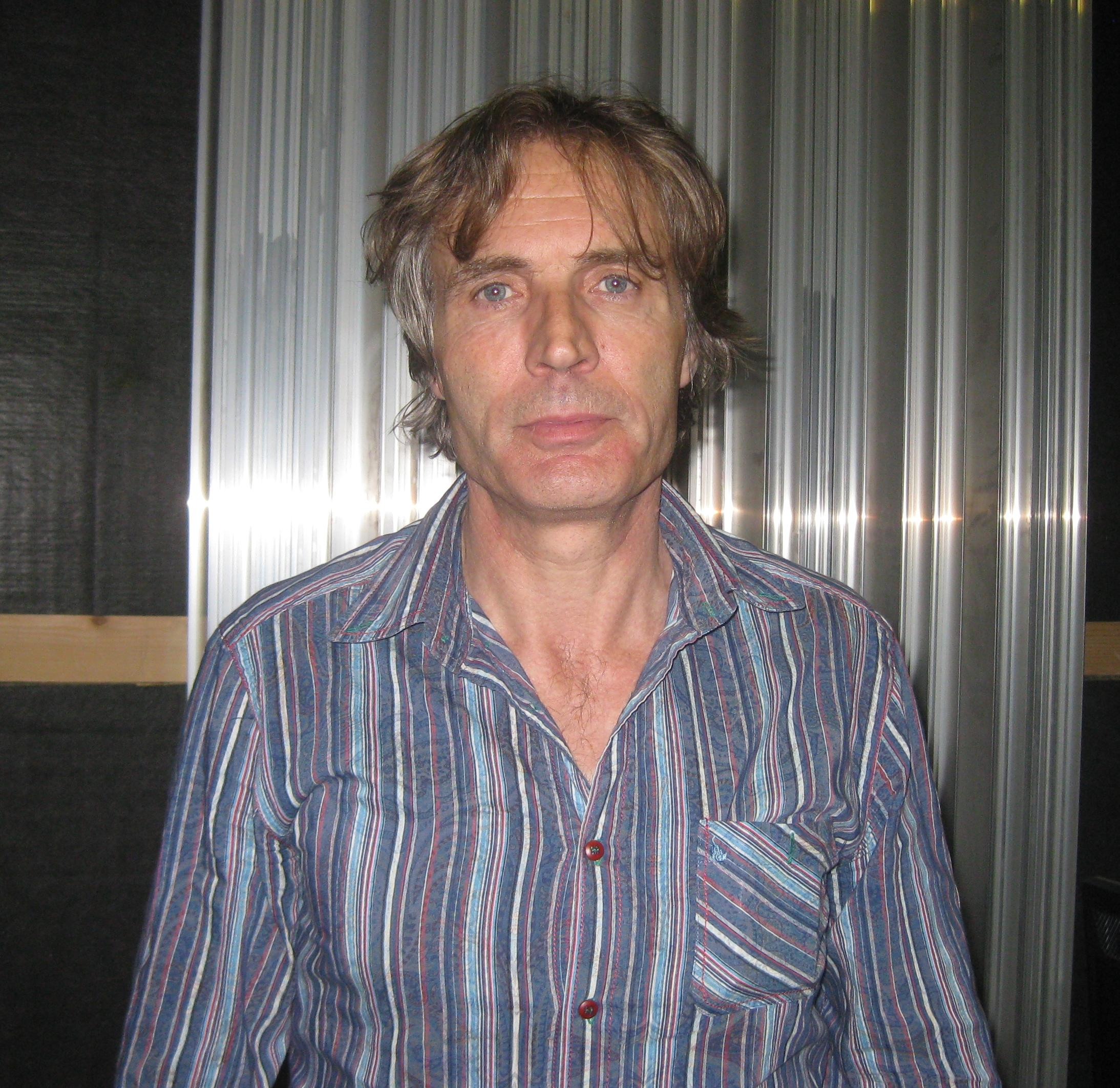
- Binev, 2015
- Born: Vasil Georgiev Binev; October 13, 1957 (age 68); Sofia, Bulgaria
- Education: Krastyo Sarafov National Academy for Theatre and Film Arts
- Occupation: Actor
- Years active: 1980s–present

Vasil Georgiev Binev (Bulgarian: Васил Георгиев Бинев) (born October 13, 1957) is a Bulgarian actor. He is best known for his voice over roles in famous television series and films.

== Acting career ==
In 1986, he graduated from NATFIZ with a degree in acting. From 1986 to 1988 he acted in the Drama Theater "Yordan Yovkov" in Dobrich. From 1988 to 1989 he acted in the Drama Theater "Adriana Budevska" in Burgas. Throughout the 1990s, he starred in plays on the stage of The Bulgarian Army Theater, however he is currently active mostly in voice overs.

In 2018, he played the businessman Ivo Fotev from the fifth and sixth season of Stolen Life in NOVA.

== Voice acting career ==
The productions which he has dubbed into Bulgarian include Dharma and Greg, Farscape, CSI: Miami, Las Vegas, Lost, Desperate Housewives, Prison Break and The Big Bang Theory.

In 2010, he won the Icarus award in the category "Golden Voice" for his work on the TV series Yabanci Damat. He won after being nominated in 2006, 2007 and 2008.

== Personal life ==
He is in a relationship with the actress Silvia Lulcheva. They have a daughter, Elitsa.

== Roles ==
Role	Production	Year
Vesela's Father	A Dose of Happiness (Доза щастие)	2019
Ivo Fotev	Stolen Life (Откраднат живот)	2018
Client	Relationships (Връзки)	2015
Ivan Kibika (Johnny)	Sex, Lies and TV (Секс, лъжи и ТВ: Осем дни в седмицата)	2013
Stefan	Sofia Residents in Excess (Столичани в повече)	2013
Narrator	The Tree of Life (Дървото на живота)	2013
-	Observer (Наблюдателя)	2001
The Father	Santa Claus's Grandson (Внукът на дядо Коледа)	1998
-	Policemen and Criminals (Полицаи и престъпници: Нощта на самодивите)	1995
Zhelyo	Vampire (Вампир)	1991
Zaharia	The Nights of Antimovian Inn (Вечери в Антимовския хан)	1988
