= Investigation (film) =

- Film poster
- Directed by: Iglika Trifonova
- Written by: Iglika Trifonova
- Produced by: Helge Albers; Petra Goedings; Rossitsa Valkanova
- Starring: Krassimir Dokov; Svetla Yancheva
- Cinematography: Rali Raltschev
- Edited by: Yordanka Bachvarova
- Music by: Han Otten
- Distributed by: Phanta Vision Film International B.V.
- Release date: September 2, 2006
- Running time: 155 minutes
- Country: Bulgaria
- Language: Bulgarian

Investigation (Bulgarian: Разследване; Romanisation: Razsledvane) is a 2006 Bulgarian film directed by Iglika Trifonova.

== Plot ==
Parts of a corpse have been found and a suspect, Plamen Goranov (Krassimir Dokov), brother of the murdered man, is detained. He denies any charges and for want of conclusive evidence, the investigation is about to be suspended. Then a new investigator is appointed, Alexandra Yakimova (Svetla Yancheva), who starts everything from scratch. In daytime she interrogates relatives, friends and colleagues of two brothers and at night she questions the suspect. She hasn't got much time left for her family. Solitude has been her own choice and she tries to make up it overburdening herself with more and more work. Loneliness is also eating up Plamen, the tough rogue, who starts cherishing his encounters with the investigator for the chance to talk to her. The film follows the course of the investigation through the filter of its main subject: possible or impossible human communication.

== Cast ==
- Krassimir Dokov - Plamen
- Svetla Yancheva - Alexandra
- Labina Mitevska - Semeyna Priyatelka (Family Friend)
- Kliment Denchev - Sledovatel (Examining magistrate)
- Deyan Donkov - Pomoshtnik (Assistant)
- Hristo Garbov - Saptugat (Husband of Alexandra)
- Emilia Radeva - Maykata (Mother of Plamen)
- Tanya Shahova - Saprugata (Wife of Plamen)
- Margita Gosheva - Sestrata (Sister of Plamen)
- Peter Slabakov - Chichoto (Uncle of Plamen)
- Liubov Liubcheva - Brtatowchedka (Cousin of Plamen)
- Plamen Dimitrov - Sinat na Plamen (Son of Plamen)

== Awards ==
- The film received several awards at the 2006 Golden Rose Bulgarian Feature Film Festival.
