= Brave Festival =

Music festival in Poland

- Genre: World music, rituals, theatre, prayers
- Dates: first half of July
- Locations: Wrocław, Poland
- Years active: 2005–present
- Founders: Grzegorz Bral
- Website: www.bravefestival.pl

Brave Festival – Against Cultural Exile is an annual Polish music festival launched in 2005 by Song of the Goat Theatre Association. It takes place in Wrocław, as well as in other cities in Lower Silesia. Since inception, artists from all over the world have been invited to present their musical/cultural traditions. The festival is intended as an opportunity for attendees to speak about where they come from, their values, their traditions and their spirituality. It aims to save and protect forgotten, abandoned and forlorn cultures. Brave Festival also has a project called Brave Kids, which aims is to introduce, integrate and start a collaboration of artistic groups of children from different continents. Grzegorz Bral is the director of Brave Festival.

In 2011 Brave Festival was included in the official list of The Cultural Programme of the Polish EU Presidency 2011 in the category “Cylic cultural events and festivals organized by local and non-governmental institutions.” The following groups help to support the festival: President of the City of Wrocław - Rafal Dutkiewicz, UNESCO, Marshal of the dolnośląskie voivodeship - Rafał Jurkowlaniec and the Ministry of Culture and National Heritage.

== Idea of Brave Festival ==
Since now there were ten editions of festival: The Magic of Voice (2005), Voices of Asia (2006), Drowned Songs (2007), The Ritual starts it Africa (2008), Prayers of the world (2009), Enchanters (2010), The Mask (2011), Women Initiating (2012), Lost Rhythm (2013), Sacred Body (2014), Griot (2015) and Outcasts (2016). Each edition presents concerts, theatre, performances, rituals, prayers and art of the people, tribes, groups or individuals from all over the world.

During the festival people, who don't agree on exile from their own traditions and sensitivity, share their culture. Brave Festival supports them by concerts, exhibitions, workshops (dance, musical and handicraft ones) and film programs. All those events allow attendees to see and experience what couldn't be seen otherwise.

Festival places were among others: theatres in Wrocław (Teatr Polski, Wrocławski Teatr Współczesny, Teatr Pieśń Kozła), cinemas (Dolnośląskie Centrum Filmowe), galleries (Galeria BWA Design, ArtBrut) and other cultural places (The White Stork Synagogue, the Impart Art Center, Opera Wrocławska, Wytwórnia Filmów Fabulranych). There were also outdoor events.

Brave Festival hosted artists and groups from China, Japan, Korea, Taiwan, Singapore, Russia, Australia, Egypt, Georgia, Bulgaria, India, Mali, Tanzania, Burkina Faso, Chile, USA, Ukraine, Uganda, Kyrgyz Republic, Mongolia, Niger, Azerbaijan, Pakistan, Poland, Corse, Rumania, Israel, Sardinia, Macedonia, Marocco, Grance and other countries.

Revenue from festival ticket sales are designated to support humanitarian activities in Tibet led by the international charity organization, ROKPA.

== Festival main program ==
=== 2018 ===
The thirteenth edition of Brave Festival took place on 13–22 July 2018 and was organized under the slogan "Visible-Invisible", which revealed a number of unique, often difficult to reach to a wider audience, artistic phenomena. The eleven invited artists or creative groups share a decidedly social character and the fact that they all use art – primarily music and theatre – not as entertainment and decoration, but as a tool to influence social change and stagnant reality, and as a weapon against injustice and exclusion.

=== 2017 ===
The festival for 2017 was cancelled due to lack of funding.

=== 2016 ===
12th edition of the festival took place between 1st and 16 July 2016 and was organized under the title "Outcasts - Wykluczeni". It was a significant and symbolic edition, because in 2016 more than any in other year so far it dealt specifically with "exile". Organizers decided to discuss people who have always been different in their own communities or in foreign ones, for which they have been stigmatized. "Outcasts - Wykluczeni" was host to a number of events from across the world showing people whose everyday lives are, for a variety of reasons, very difficult and complicated. Brave Festival showed people who used art to change or even utilize their exclusion.

Artists	Country	Description
Bakri Ki Mashak	India	Gypsies from The States of Rajasthan
Aeham Ahmad	Syria	Pianist and refugee from Syria
Deafbeat	Malaysia	Deaf drummers from Malaysia
21 Theatre	Poland	Theatre of actors with Down syndrome
Blind Ballet Company Fernanda Bianchini	Brazil	Ballet of blind dancers
Candoco Dance Company	United Kingdom	Dance and theatrical group of artists with disabilities
Nalaga'at Theater	Israel	Theatre of blind and deaf actors
Musicians without Borders	Palestine	Musicians and social workers
Ivan Perez i Korzo Producties	Spain	Contemporary dance
Song of the Goat Theatre	Poland	Performance titled Songs of Lear
Song of the Goat Theatre	Poland	Performance titled Crazy God
Song of the Goat Theatre	Poland	Performance titled Portraits of The Cherry Orchard

=== 2015 ===
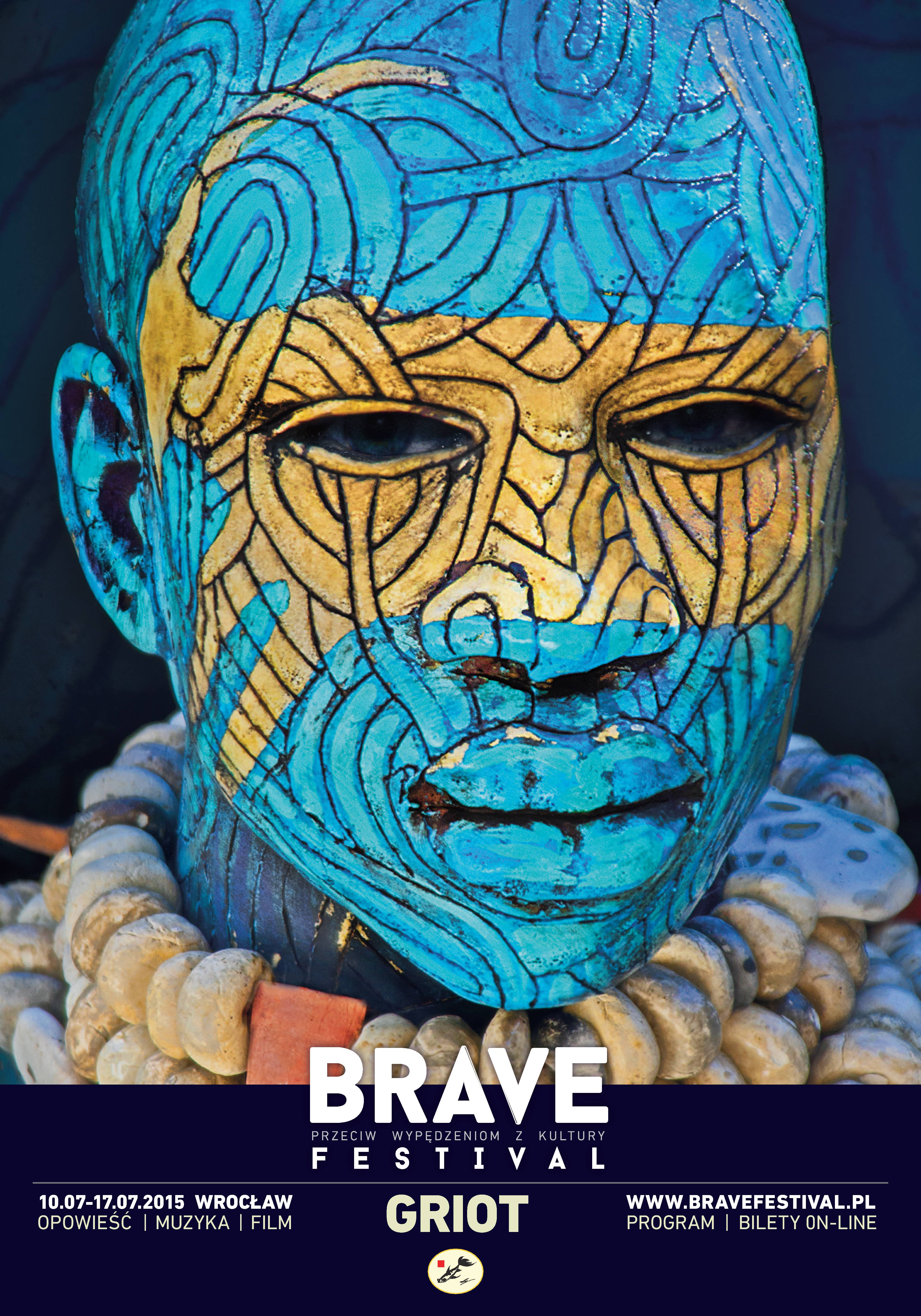
Poster of Brave Festival 2015 "Griot"

11th edition of the festival titled "Griot" took place between 10th and 17 July 2015. In the cultures of West Africa, griots are guardians of tradition, bards, poets, singers, storytellers and musicians, who for ages have had a great significance for the culture mainly from the area of today's Gambia, Mali, Senegal, Burkina Faso, Liberia and Mauretania. Their stories are tightly connected with sounds and rhythm. For centuries, the function of a griot has been reserved exclusively for men born in one of a few clans, where this honourable role was passed on from generation to generation, from a father to a son. The undeniable role, which they play in creating the African culture, especially today, in the times of sudden civilisation changes, when keeping and protection of own heritage are becoming more and more difficult – makes griots ideally align with the mission of Brave Festival. Among invited artists there were: Kassé Mady Diabaté (Mali), Abou Diarra (Mali), Zanzibar Taarab/Kidumbak Ensemble (Zanzibar) czy Coumbane Ely Mint Warakane (Mauritania).

Artists	Country	Description
Balla Kouyaté	Mali	Master of balaphon from Mali
Sona Jobarteh	Gambia	First female kora virtuoso
Abou Diarra	Mali	N'goni virtuoso
Ndima	Congo	Polyphonic sings of pygmies AKA from Congo
Zanzibar Taarab/Kidumbak Ensemble	Tanzania	Guardians of the Zanzibari traditions of taarab and kidumbak
Coumbane Ely Mint Warakane	Mauritania	Mauritanian griot
Kassé Mady Diabaté	Mali	Descendant of one of the most renowned griot families
Vieux Farka Touré	Mali	Desert blues of Mali
Song of the Goat Theatre	Poland	Performance titled Songs of Lear
Griot (film)	United States	Directed by Volker Goetze

=== 2014 ===
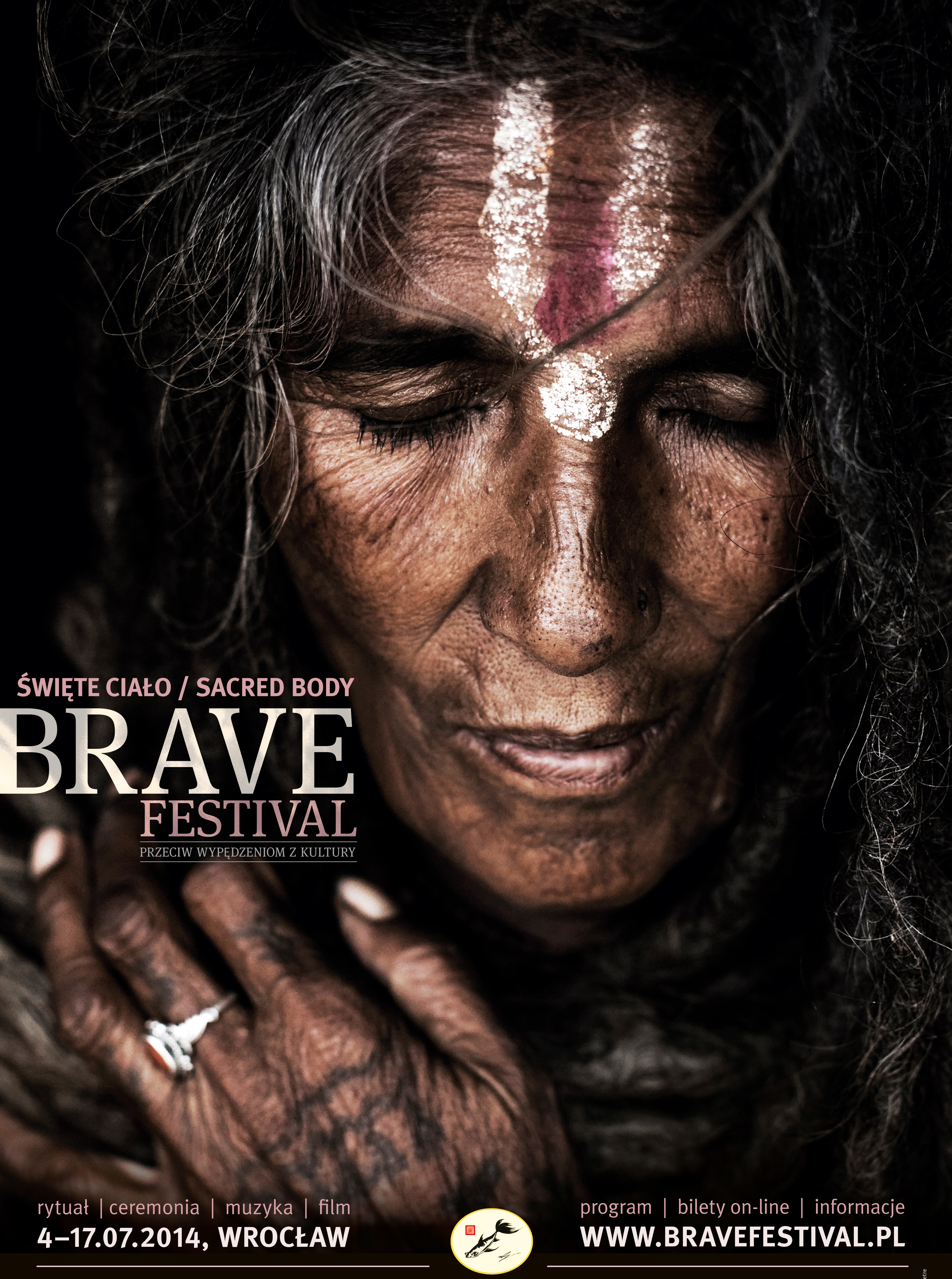
Poster of Brave Festival "Sacred Body" 2014

10th edition of Brave Festival titled "Sacred Body" took place in 4–17 July 2014. The festival's program focused on the theatre, dance and ritual – all of them come from artistic traditions in which the body, the leitmotif, is shown either in a literal or in a symbolic way. Among others were Rama Vaidyanathan – mistress of classical Indian dance Bharata Natjam, Melanie Lomoff – French dancer with ballet education and Koffi Kôkô – voodoo priest and a representative of contemporary African dance. This year's Brave Festival main program was also accompanied by Film Program divided into three theme sections: Brave People Doc, Brave Contexts and Brave Focus, devoted to India. The Festival's opening film was ‘The Light of Asia’ by Franz Osten from 1925 featuring live music – an original score composed and performed by the Divana Ensemble from Rajasthan.

Artists	Country	Description
Balega	Indonesia	Music of the body in the randai tradition of Western Sumatra
Koffi Kôkô	Benin	Choreographies of African voodoo
Melanie Lomoff	France	Modern dance inspired by human figures from triptychs by Francis Bacon
Mudijettu	India	Ritual theatre from the temples of Kerala
Rama Vaidyanathan	India	Indian dance of body and soul Bharata Natjam
Rupinder	India	Ritual songs of India
Sarpam Thullal	India	Ritual devoted to the Serpent Gods from Kerala
Teatr 21	Poland	Performance The Love Boat
Song of the Goat Theatre	Poland	Performance titled Songs of Lear

=== 2013 ===
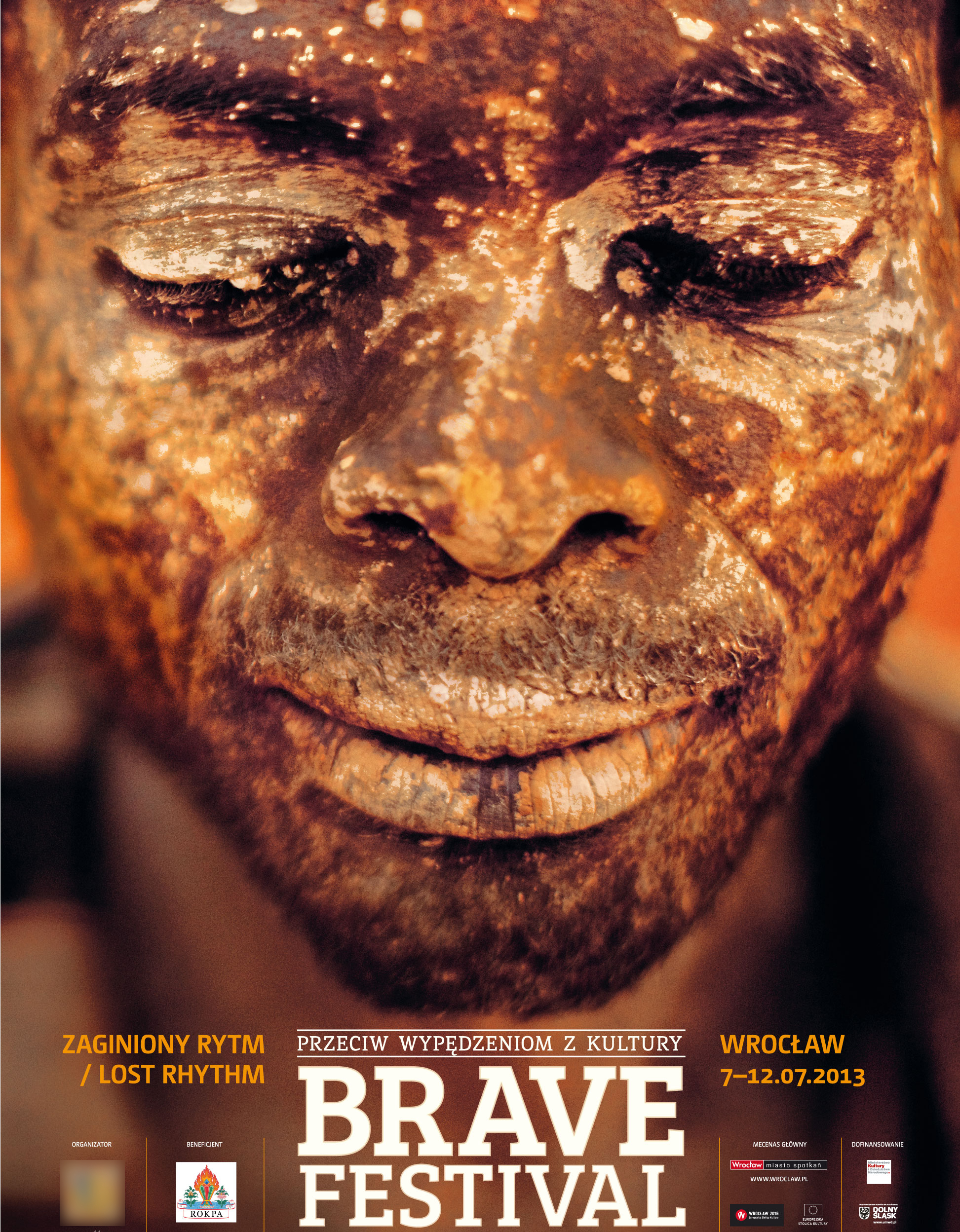
Poster of Brave Festival "Lost Rhythm" 2013

Brave Festival – Against Cultural Exile, 9th edition titled "Lost Rhythm" took place between 7th and 12 July 2013 in Wrocław. The program of the 9th edition of Brave Festival, as each year, consisted of performances, concerts, film screenings, exhibitions, workshops and open forum meetings. During six days many extraordinary artists from all over the world presented a number of authentic and little known rituals, ceremonies, sacred songs and other artistic traditions from Asia, Africa, South Africa and Europe. Among others invited were representatives of various distant cultures (dancers, singers and actors) whose artistic activity circles around rhythm and its meaning. The audience then had a chance to take part in the "One" – performance of Korean group “Cheong-bae” which presented the Yeon-hee style: a combination of ritual, shamanistic music, dance and acrobatics. Among others was Addal, group of women from the Berber people performing the addal dance, a unique form of ahouach and Rotal Drummers of Burundi. This year's Brave Festival main program was accompanied also by a series of meetings under a banner of Brave Meetings . During this year's Brave Festival, the audience had the opportunity to get to know members of the guest performers in Wrocław. In addition to the above, 19 film images were screened as part of Brave Festival film program and each of them referred to this-year theme – the rhythm – in more or less obvious way. Also, the fourth edition of Brave Kids took place 25.06-13.07.2013 in Wrocław, Puszczykowo, Warsaw, Łódź and Krosnice. It gathered 114 kids and leaders from following countries: India, Uganda, Zimbabwe, China, Georgia, Israel, Czech Republic, Laos, Iran, Kyrgyzstan and Poland.

Artists	Country	Description
Addal	Morocco	Moroccan dance of women of the Ameln Valley
Bachu Khan	Pakistan	Moroccan dance of women of the Ameln Valley
Cheong-Bae	South Korea	Korean rituals and ceremonies with a dance Gim Cheonbukchum
Houria Aïchi & L’Hijâz’Car	Algeria	Korean rituals and ceremonies with a dance Gim Cheonbukchum
Mohini Devi	India	Snake dance of the Kalbelias of Rajasthan
Ngqoko Group	South Africa	Women's choir of the Xhosa people from South Africa
Rupinder	India	Music of the proud sons of the Indian Punjab
Sona Jobareth	Gambia	Music of royal kora in feminine interpretation
Song of the Goat Theatre	Poland	Performance titled Songs of Lear
The Drummers of Burundi	Burundi	Royal percussionists

=== 2012 ===
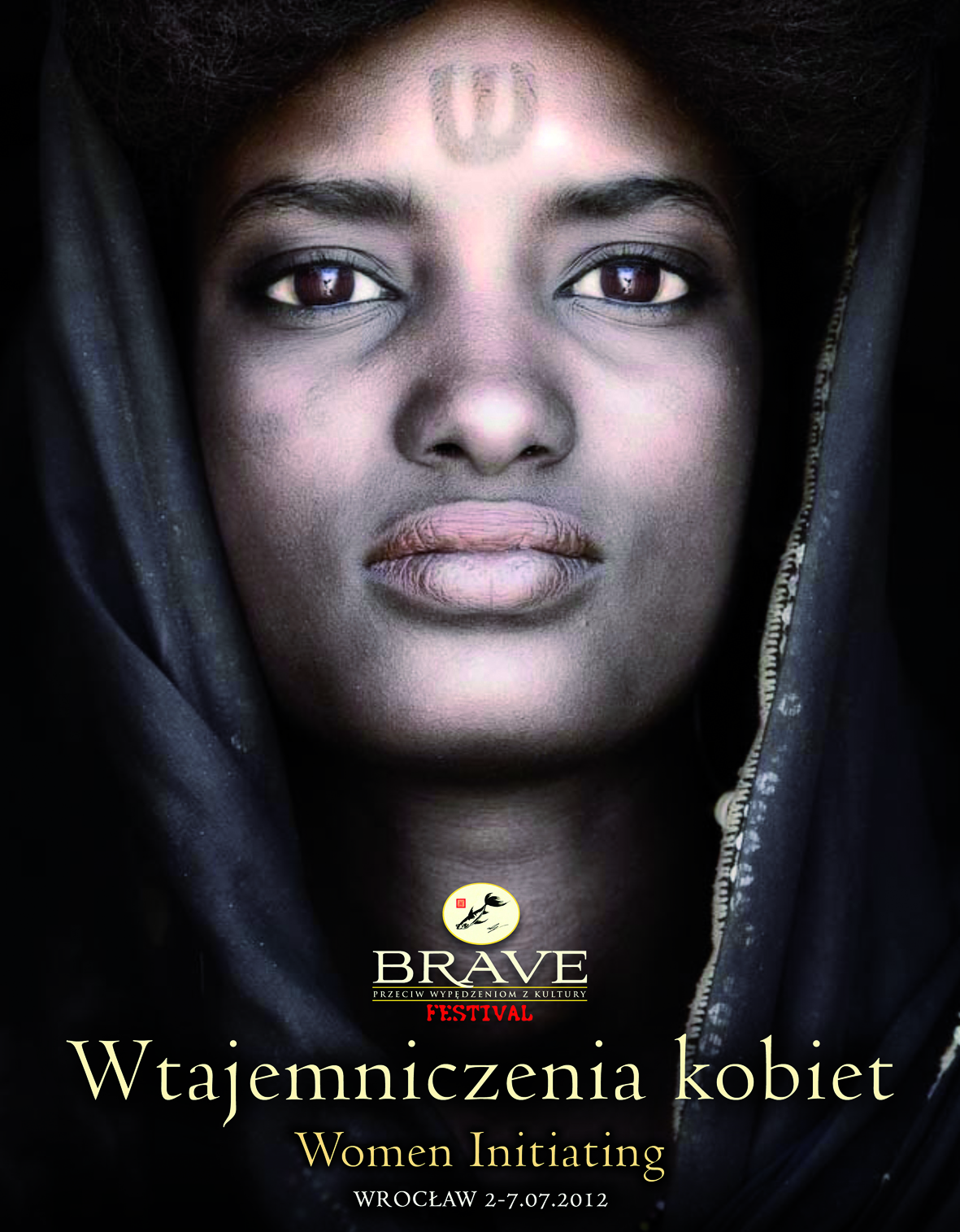
Poster of Brave Festival "Women Initiating" 2012

Between 2 and 7 July 2012 the 8th edition of Brave Festival – festival against cultural exile – one of the most unusual initiatives in Europe, held again in Wrocław (Poland). 2012 year's edition was entitled "Women Initiating". The program included projects presented by women from around the world. Brave Festival is a unique event, as apart from revealing to the audience the secrets of vanishing cultures, it also provides help to others. 100% of the proceeds from ticket sales are donated each year to ROKPA International, an organization that supports children in Nepal, Tibet and African countries. 2012 year's edition saw among others the prenuptial tradition of unyago, presented by Bi Kidude – a one hundred-years’ old drummer from Zanzibar; the voices of the elderly ladies from the Meninas de Sinhá group from Brazil, showed how one can face the adversities of life with the help of singing and playing music; while the descendants of the Tuareg people, whom the members of Tartit group from Mali are drawn from, proved that the blues derives from Africa.

Artists	Country	Description
Ambuya Nyati	Zimbabwe	Mbira music from the tradition of the Shona people
Bi Kidude	Tanzania	Unyago tradition – initiation ritual of Zanzibar
Casletila	Georgia	Female choir of the Svaneti people
Debaa	Mayotte	Female group singing in Sufi tradition
Jukurrpa	Australia	Ceremony of Warlpiri women
Maduma Women's Drumming Group	Tanzania	Music and dance mapelembo tradition
Meninas de Sinhá	Brazil	Vocal group of elder women
Song of the Goat Theatre	Poland	Performance titled Songs of Lear
Tartit	Mali	Hypnotic music of Tuaregs – Saharan ethnic group
Terah Tali	Pakistan	Performance of sound and music by women from Rajasthan

=== 2011 ===
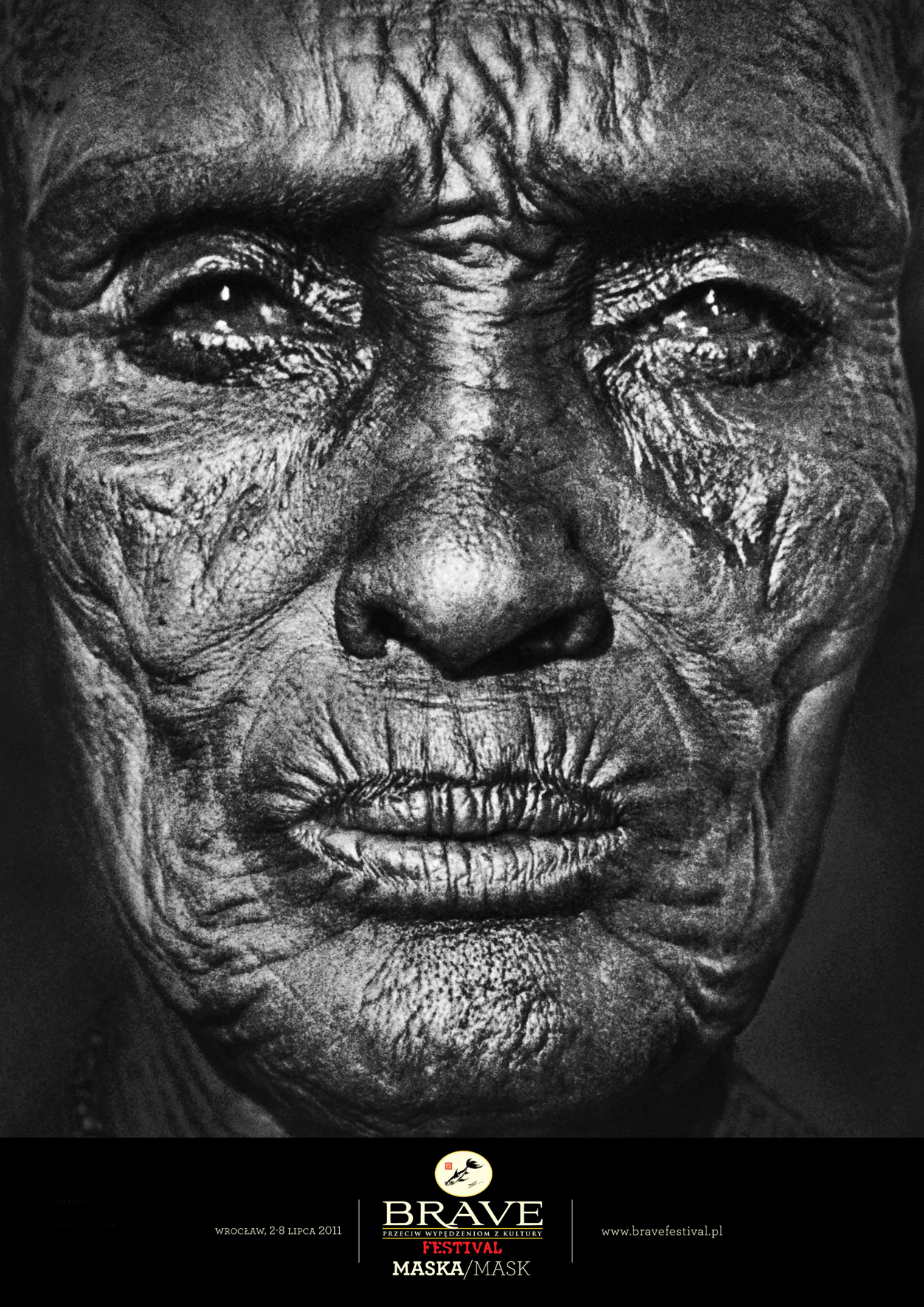
Poster of Brave Festival "The Mask" 2011

7th edition took place from July 2-8, 2011 under the title "Mask." The title Mask brings the rich culture of various parts of the world closer, among others Bali, Sri Lanka, Furkina Faso or Sardinia. In 2011 the audience had a chance to engage with authentic culture, forgotten traditions, mysterious rituals and the art of the most remote regions of the globe. The indigenous artists and representatives of endangered cultures arrived to the capital city of Lower Silesia. The festival audience had the chance to see the representative of the Sardinian carnival – Mamuthones, dancers from Bali, the traditional Hindu drama – Kathakali, or Blind Note – a show by musicians performing, in complete darkness, on traditional, local instruments. The main events were accompanied by a series of documentaries, the Brave Kids project, exhibitions, meetings with the artists, and workshops.

Artists	Country	Description
Ballaké Sissoko & Vincent Segal	Senegal	Virtuosos of Kora and Cello
Bwa Tribe	Burkina Faso	Masks of the Moon – fiery ritual
Be-being	South Korea	Multimedia project devoted to the mask
Blind Note	multicultural group	World Music played in darkness
Kathakli	India	Indian theatre tradition combining drama and dance
Mamuthones	Sardinia	Mask ritual from Middle Ages
Marcin Jarnuszkiewicz	Poland	Suite for an Actor and a Puppet
Reza Mazandarani	Iran	Improvised music
Saharyia	India	Swang Dance
Song of the Goat Theatre	Poland	Performance titled Songs of Lear
Topeng Pejgan – I Made Djimat	India	Mask performance of ten personifications
Tovil Dancers	Sri Lanka	Exorcisms of the Sinhala People

=== 2010 ===
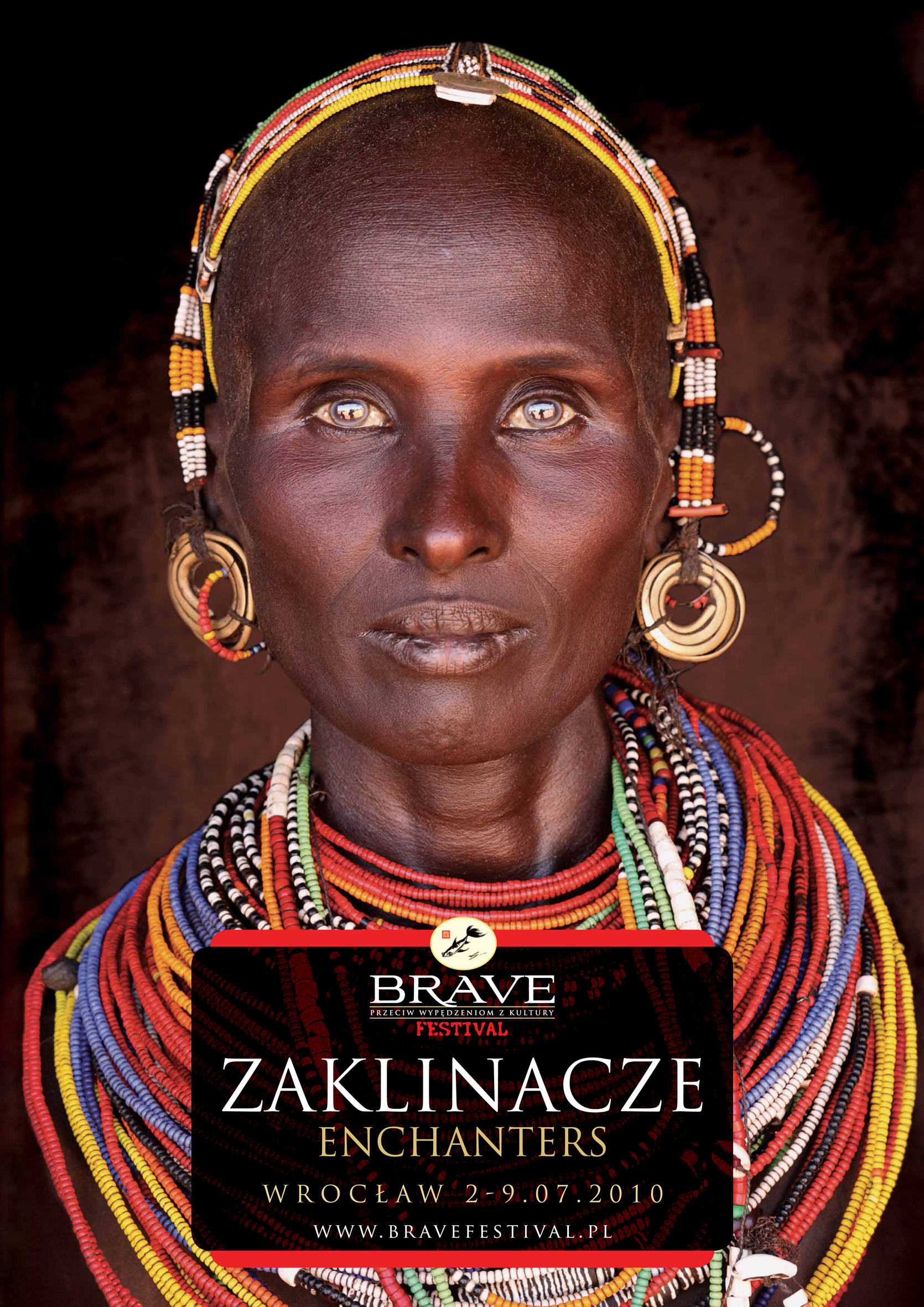
Poster of BraveFestival "Echanters" 2010

The 6th edition of Brave Festival was called "Enchanters" and aimed to focus on the presentation a wide range of traditions in which word has a significant meaning, not being only a sound or an information carrier, traditions that recognize the energy of word and pay a great attention to its poetic, power of expression, melody and rhythm. Invited by organizers to Wrocław came the solo artists and groups from all over the world, among others: Korean mistress of ancient art pansori – Ahn Sook-sun, Bi Kidude – 100 years old diva of taraab music from Zanzibar, Bulgarian group Bistritsa performing Balkan polyphonies and Sekouba Traoré, Malian master of donso n'goni.

Artists	Country	Description
Ahn Sook-sun	South Korea	Old Korean opera tradition – pansori
Bi Kidude	Tanzania	Queen of African music tradition taarab
Bistritsa	Bulgaria	Balkan polyphonic songs of healing
Lorenzo Aillapan	Chile	The Bird-Man – onomatopoeic vocal shows of the Mapuche Indians
Mawawil	Egypt	Improvised ballads of the Egyptian wilderness
Mazaher	Egypt	Forbidden tradition of Zar: a pre-Islamic ritual
Nuna	Burkina Faso	Mask dances
Royal Drummers of Burundi	Burundi	Rhythms from the heart of Africa
Sekouba Traoré	Mali	Virtuoso donso n’goni player
Song of the Goat Theatre	Poland	Macbeth – avant-garde performance

=== 2009 ===
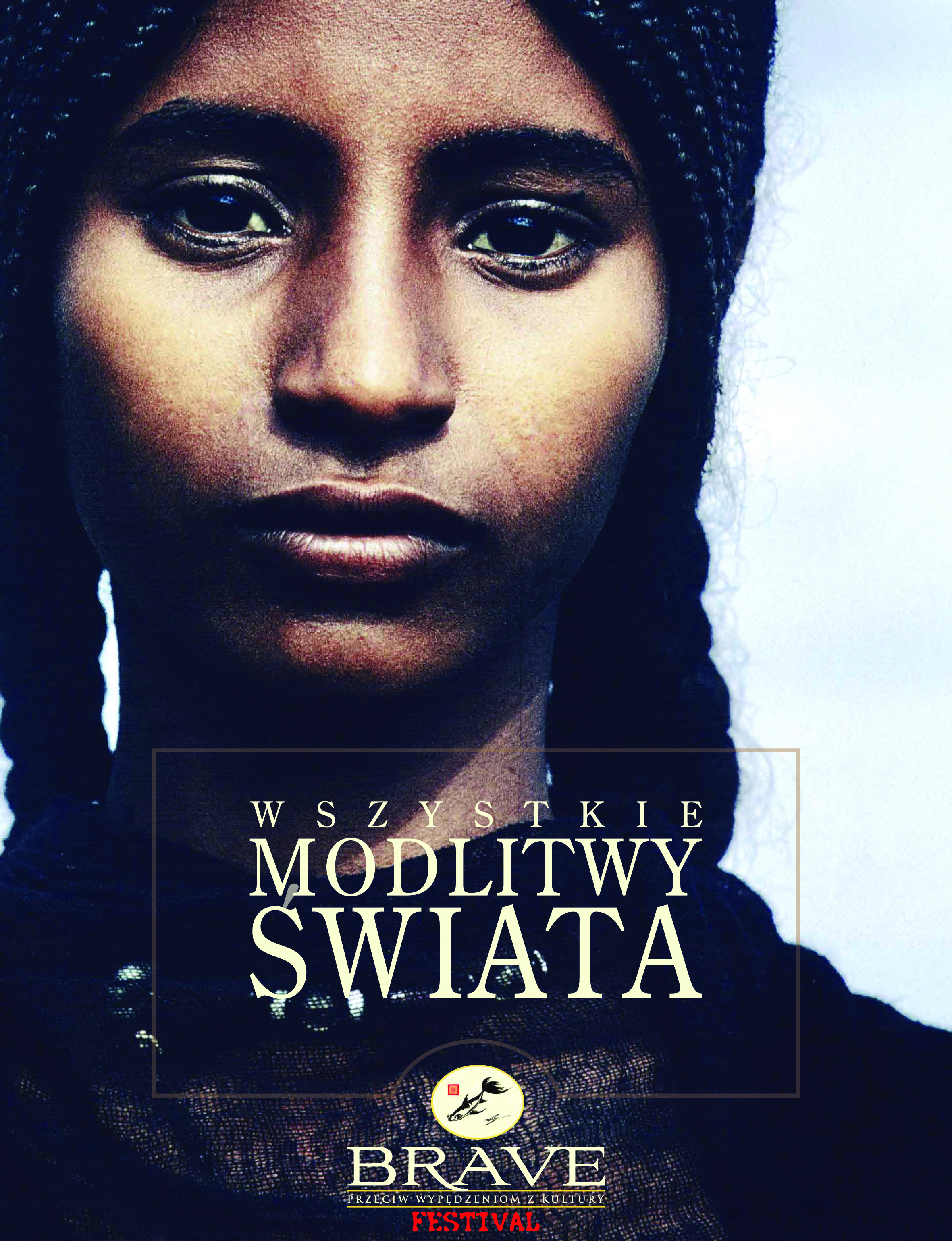
Poster of Brave Festival "Prayers of the World" 2009

The fifth edition of Brave Festival was entitled “Prayers of the World". The festival took place not only in Wrocław, but also in other cities of Lower Silesia, namely Oleśnica, Wołów, Świdnica and Kłodzko. During the event artists and genuine representatives of traditional cultures performed original songs, rituals and ceremonies connected with prayers and observances still practiced in many religions of different cultural regions of the world, from, among others, Asia, Africa and Europe. The audience had the chance to take part in the rituals performed by a Korean shaman, Tibetan monks or Theyyam dancers.

Artists	Country	Description
A Filetta	France	Corsican liturgical songs
Divina	Serbia	Orthodox Liturgies
El Cuadro Flamenco	Spain	Flamenco concert
Gogo Milungu Group	Tanzania	Taming ritual
Monks from the Sherab Ling Monastery	India	Cham dances. Rituals of Tantric Buddhism
Theyyam	India	Dance of incarnated god – ritual from Kerala state
Zikr Ceremony	Georgia	Sufi ritual of the Kist women from the Pankisi Gorge

=== 2008 ===
Poster of Brave Festival "The Ritual Starts in Africa" 2008

The fourth edition of Brave Festival was entitled “The Ritual Starts in Africa". The work of both African artists and others which was presented during this edition enabled spectators to witness new, unknown qualities of the continent and allowed them to discover the core of African culture – the ritual. The festival gave spectators the chance to learn about unique practices, to meet people from culturally distant regions and to learn about various artistic forms of "the dying world". The schedule of the festival consisted of, among other steve.

nts, performances of dancers and musicians of the Fula tribe from Niger, performances by the women of the Tanzanian Wagogo tribe and many concerts, film showings, workshops, meetings and discussions with invited guests.

Artists	Country	Description
A Filetta	France	Corsican liturgical songs
Akhtar Sharif Arup Vale	Pakistan	Concert of Sufi musical tradition Qawwali
Fulbe	Niger	Dance of man beauty
Romafest	Romania	Bohemian music
Wagogo Muheme Group	Tanzania	Initiation ritual
Who I Am - Kyendi Breakdance	Uganda	Breakdance

=== 2007 ===
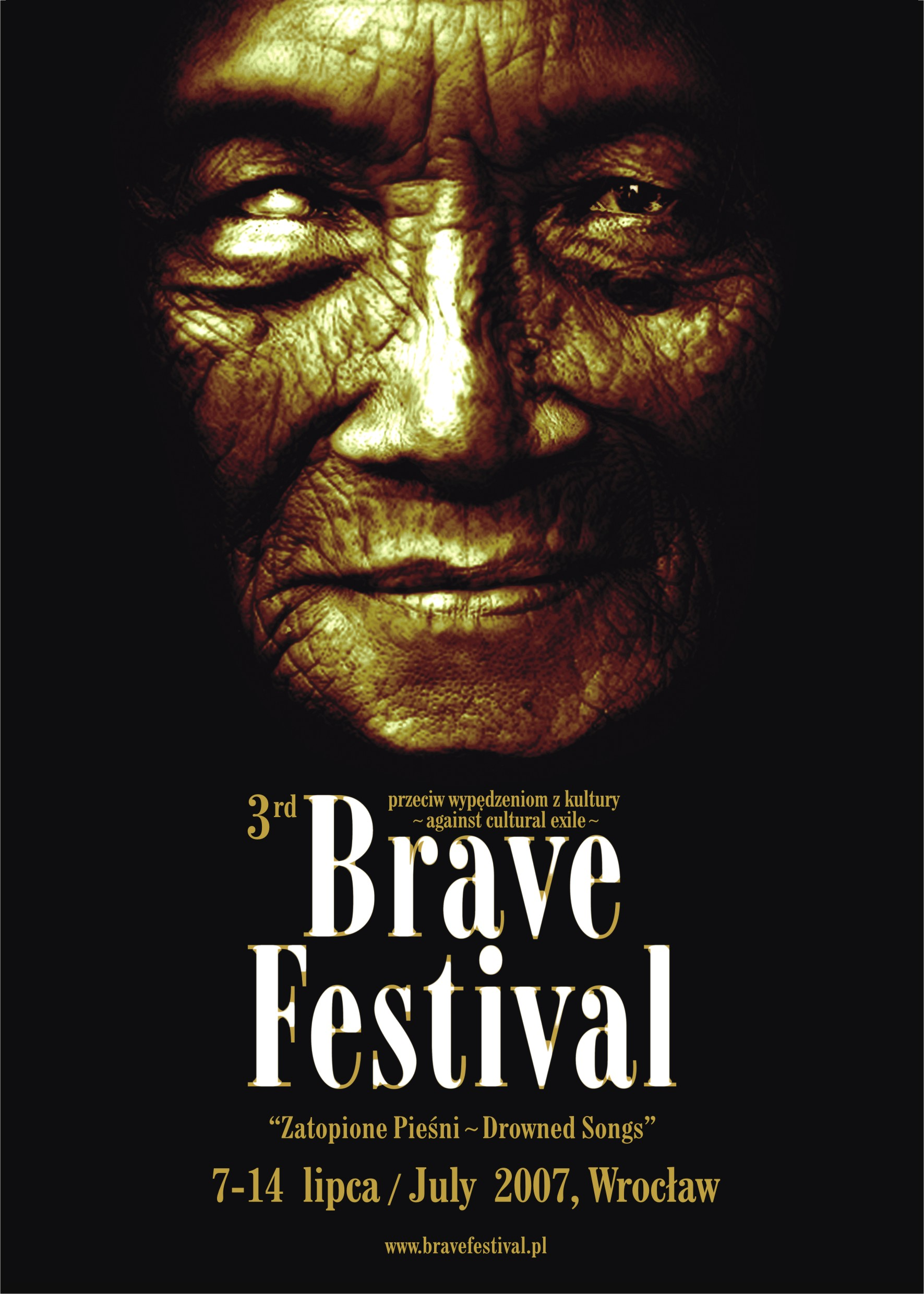
Poster of Brave Festival 2007 "Drowned Songs"

The third edition of the festival was entitled "Drowned Songs". The organizers presented not only songs, performances and films, but also the context and sources from which they came. The artists from faraway corners of the world presented, here in Wrocław, the Berber trans songs of Morocco, the Ukrainian "songs of the marshes", the refined, ancient polyphonies of Caucasus, the polyphonic dialogs of Belgorod, the mystical songs of Sardinia and "shoulder dances" of black Jews from Ethiopia.

Artists	Country	Description
Alim Quasimov	Azerbaijan	Master of mugham – modal singing
Beta Dance Troupe	Israel	Dance of Ethiopian Jewry
Bistri Vodi	Macedonia	Traditional music from Macedonia
Bunun Tribe	Taiwan	Pasibutbut – prayer for a bountiful harvest
Descendance	Australia	Songs and dances inspired by Native Australians
Narodnyj Prazdnik	Russia	Traditional Russian-Ukrainian songs
Nomadic Theatre Sakhna	Kyrgyzstan	Kyrgyz epics shown by theatre, music and sculpture
Roudaniates	Morocco	Roundaniat dance and songs
Song of the Goat Theatre	Poland	Lacrimosa – experimental theatre
Stari Koni	Ukraine	Archaic melodies fromWestern Polesie
Theatre of Eight Day	Poland	Legends of Polish student theatre from 1970s and 1980s
Teatro Actores Alidos	Italy	Songs of Sardinian women
Vakhtanguri	Georgia	Traditional songs from the region of Guria

=== 2006 ===
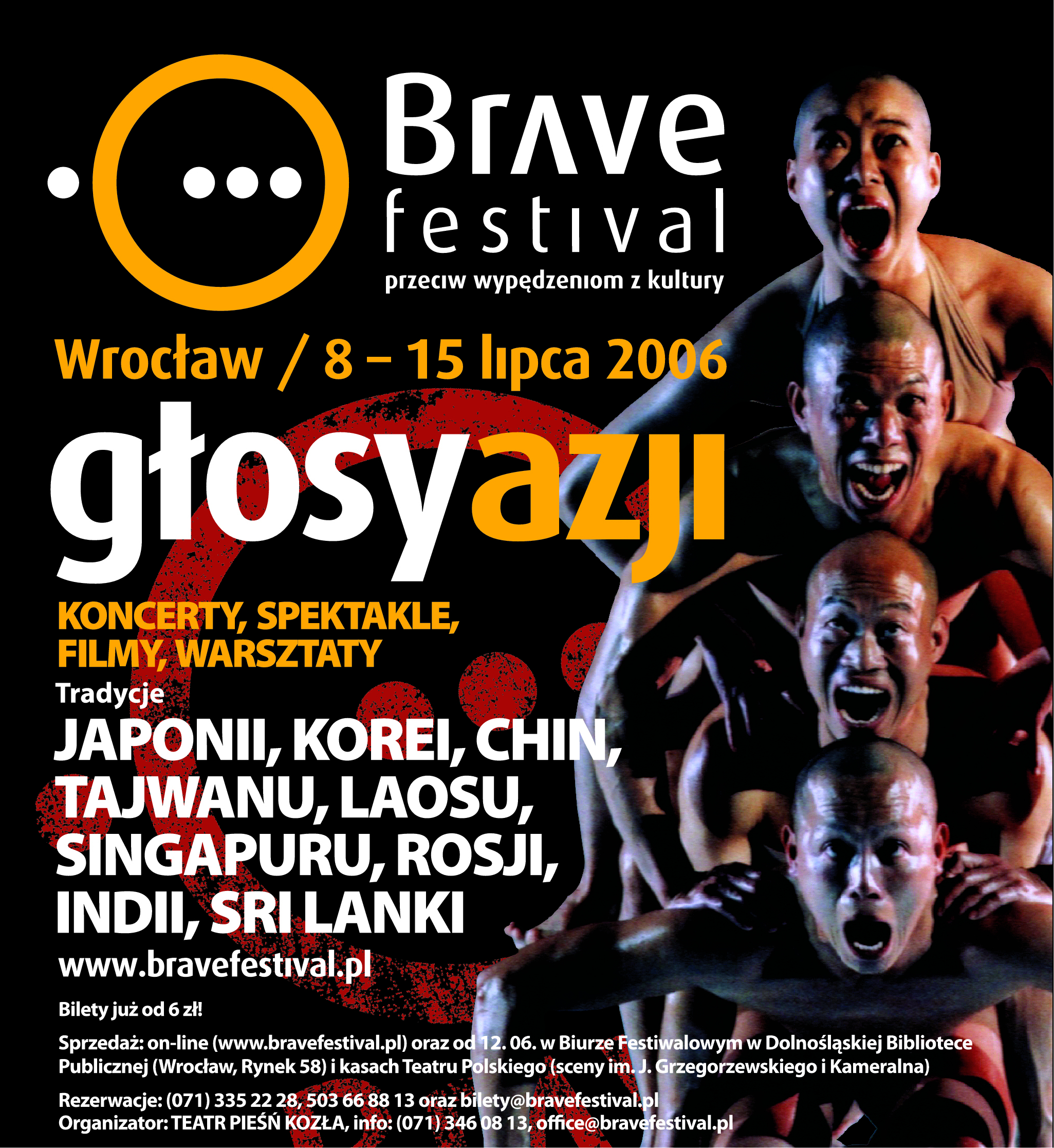
Posters of Brave Festival "Voices of Asia" 2006

"Voices of Asia" was the theme of the second edition of the festival. During this edition the traditions of Laos, Japan, Sri Lanka, Singapore, Taiwan, South Korea and Siberia were presented. In total 13 bands and 99 artists participated. There were performances, concerts and workshops of traditional dancing and singing. A series of Asian films which were accompanied by film workshops devoted to creating intercontinental documentary films and to the way films are shot. The audience were also able to attend lectures and meetings with festival guests.

Artists	Country	Description
Dulsori	South Korea	Dance and musical ritual based on percussion instruments
Gamelan Asmaradana	Singapore	Performance based on folk songs from eastern Asia
Irkuck Ensemble Authentic Music	Russia	Concert of musicians from Irkuck
Joji Hirota and the Taiko Drummers	Japan	Japanese drummers
Majowe Byki	Poland	Concert of music inspired by Africa
Masala Soundsystem	Poland	Musical concert
Noirin Ni Riain and A.M.E.N.	Ireland	Irish songs Sean-Nos
Peter Surasena Dance and Drum Ensemble	Sri Lanka	Dance performance Kandyan
Phalak Phalam Vientiane	Laos	Traditional dance theatre from Laos
Stage Punkgkyung	South Korea	Performance titled Pokojówki
Song of the Goat Theatre	Poland	Spektakl titled Chronicles – A lamentation
Song of the Goat Theatre	Poland	Lacrimosa – experimental theatre
Taipei Dance Circle	Taiwan	Dance performance
Tiat Moo	South Korea	Ritual performance
Uch-Sume-R	Russia	Traditional folk songs from native people from Khakassia
Yasukatsu Oshima Songs of My Island	Japan	Traditional Japanese music based on sanshin
Yerba Mater	Poland	Concert of Polish band inspired by cultures of the Old World

=== 2005 ===
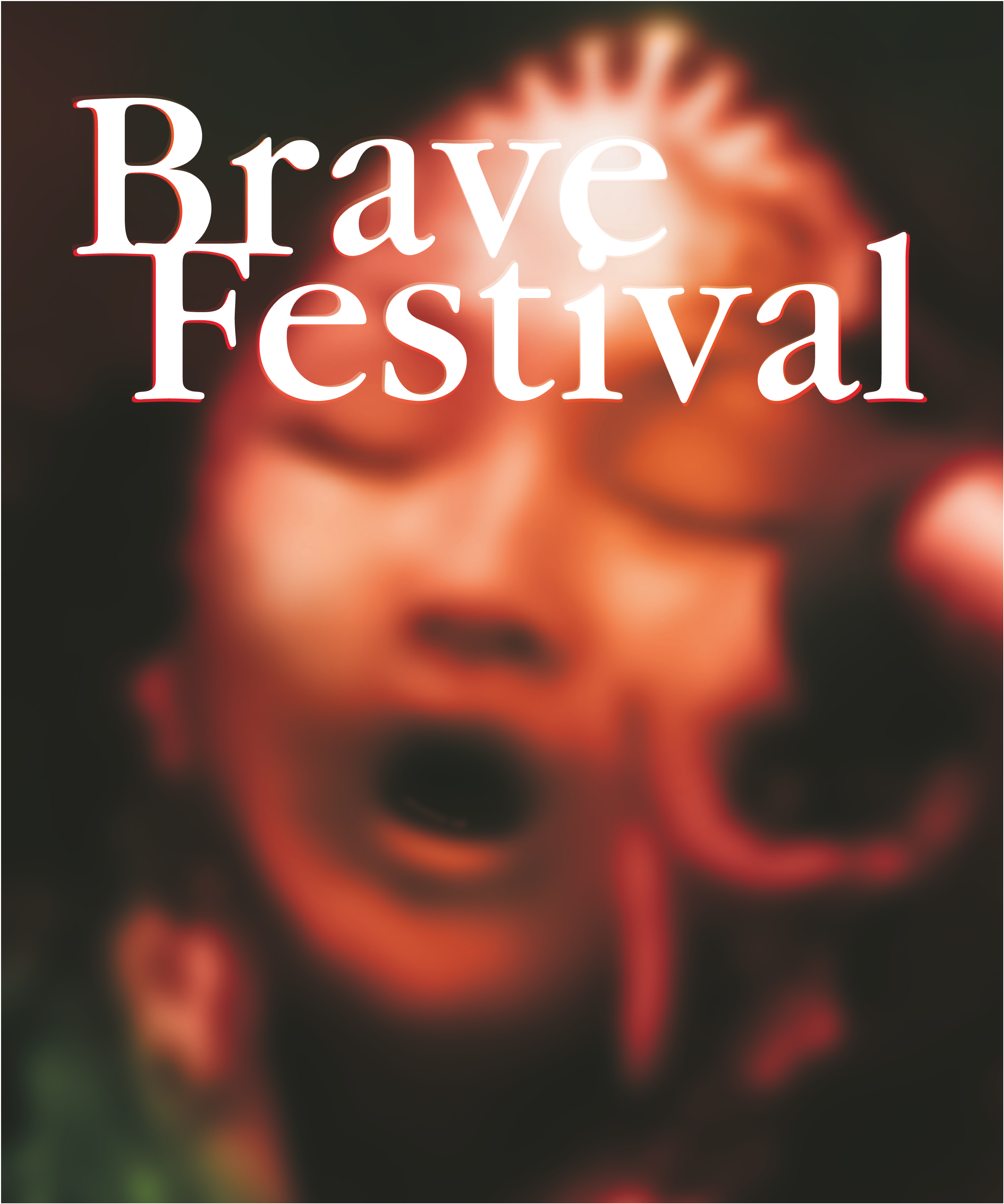
Poster of Brave Festival 2005 "The Magic of Voice"

The first edition of Brave Festival was entitled "The Magic of Voice". It explored the subject of voice – broadly understood – through performances built around songs and through concerts and workshops devoted to various vocal techniques, and to learning how to play traditional instruments mostly from the former Soviet Republics. During the festival, which lasted four days, there were presented, among others, the Siberian ugadan kurduk, singing from Tuva, the music of Svans, Khakassian singing with quarter-tones and semitones, the music of the Sufi tradition, the liturgical songs of monks from Atos, traditional Ukrainian songs, the music of Ancient Greece and African stories.

Artists	Country	Description
Alash	Russia	Concert of traditional instruments from Tuva and chomiej – guttural singing
Abdon Fortune Koumbha Kaf	Congo	Traditional Congo stories
Amelia Cuni and Werner Durand	Italy/Germany	Traditional music from West and East combined with modern sounds
Ayarhaan	Russia	Guttural singing in the dyjeretyi style
Barber Llorenc	Spain	Concert for voices and bells
Charkow Sergiej, Charkow Julia	Russia	Khai and overtone singing
CHOREA Theatre	Poland	Concert and dance performance titled Unknown sources of music and dance from Europe – Ancient Greece
Czejniesz Bajtuszkina, Georgij Bieleckij	Russia	Altaic singing
DahaBraha	Ukraine	Etno-chaos – Ukrainian folk music
Fatima Miranda	Spain	Performance combined with concert
Haig Yazdijan Oriental Project	Armenia/Greece/Iran	Concert inspired by culture of Orient
Irkutsk Ensemble Authentic Music	Russia	Concert of musicians from Irkuck
Oktoich Choir	Poland	Male choir from Wrocław
Song of the Goat Theatre	Poland	Lacrimosa – experimental theatre
ZAR Theatre	Poland	Performance titled Gospels of Childhood
Żar	Russia	Traditional folk songs

== Brave Kids ==
A part of Brave Festival is a project called Brave Kids, which consists of 3-weeks workshops for artistic groups of kids. Those kids come from regions deeply affected by natural disasters, political conflicts, homelessness or poverty. An educative programof Brave Kids has a clear priority in the center of which is a good and care of young person.

The pilot edition of Brave Kids took place in Wrocław in 2009. Organizers have invited children from Nepal and Uganda to participate in a two-week long artistic workshops, which culminated in a final performance prepared together with children from one of Wrocław's day-shelters. The workshop were implemented by Grzegorz Bral, Abraham Tekya and Leya Wyler.

First official edition of Brave Kids happened between 25 June 2010 and 9 July 2010. Artistic groups of kids from 6 different regions of the world, influenced by tragic experiences of historical, social and natural disasters came to Wrocław to create a performance together. Kids from Zimbabwe, Rwanda, Nepal, Sweden Chechnya, Ingushetia and Poland during 2 weeks of workshops were exchanging artistic skills and show their talents. Apart from learning how to deal with cultural and language barrier young artists found out the new ways to build a mutual understanding among each other. 55 participants including children, youth, artistic leaders were working towards international dialogue and got most out of this cultural exchange.

To profound a multicultural dialogue kids were accommodated with 22 host families from Wrocław. The culmination of the project was a common performance of 55 participants within the final concert of Brave Kids in the Impart Art Center.
