= Elka Nikolova =

Bulgarian filmmaker

Elka Nikolova (Bulgarian: Елка Николова) is a New York-based Bulgarian filmmaker.

She has received recognition as the director of her documentary film Binka: To Tell a Story About Silence which has helped to rekindle interest in the work and career of the pioneering Bulgarian film director Binka Zhelyazkova (1923–2011). The film took five years to make and includes interviews with many of Zhelyazkova's collaborators.

The documentary premiered in New York, at the Museum of Modern Art, on April 4, 2007, and was shown at the 2007 South East European Film Festival in Los Angeles, where it won the Audience Award for best documentary film. It also won the award for Best Debut Film at the 2007 Golden Rython Festival for Nonfeature Films, and was featured in Montreal, Quebec's International Festival of Films on Art (FIFA).

Nikolova's current project is a documentary titled, "A Question of Survival" about the plight of Bulgarian Jews in World War II. The first part of this documentary is available.
