= Krustyo Lafazanov =

Bulgarian actor (born 1961)

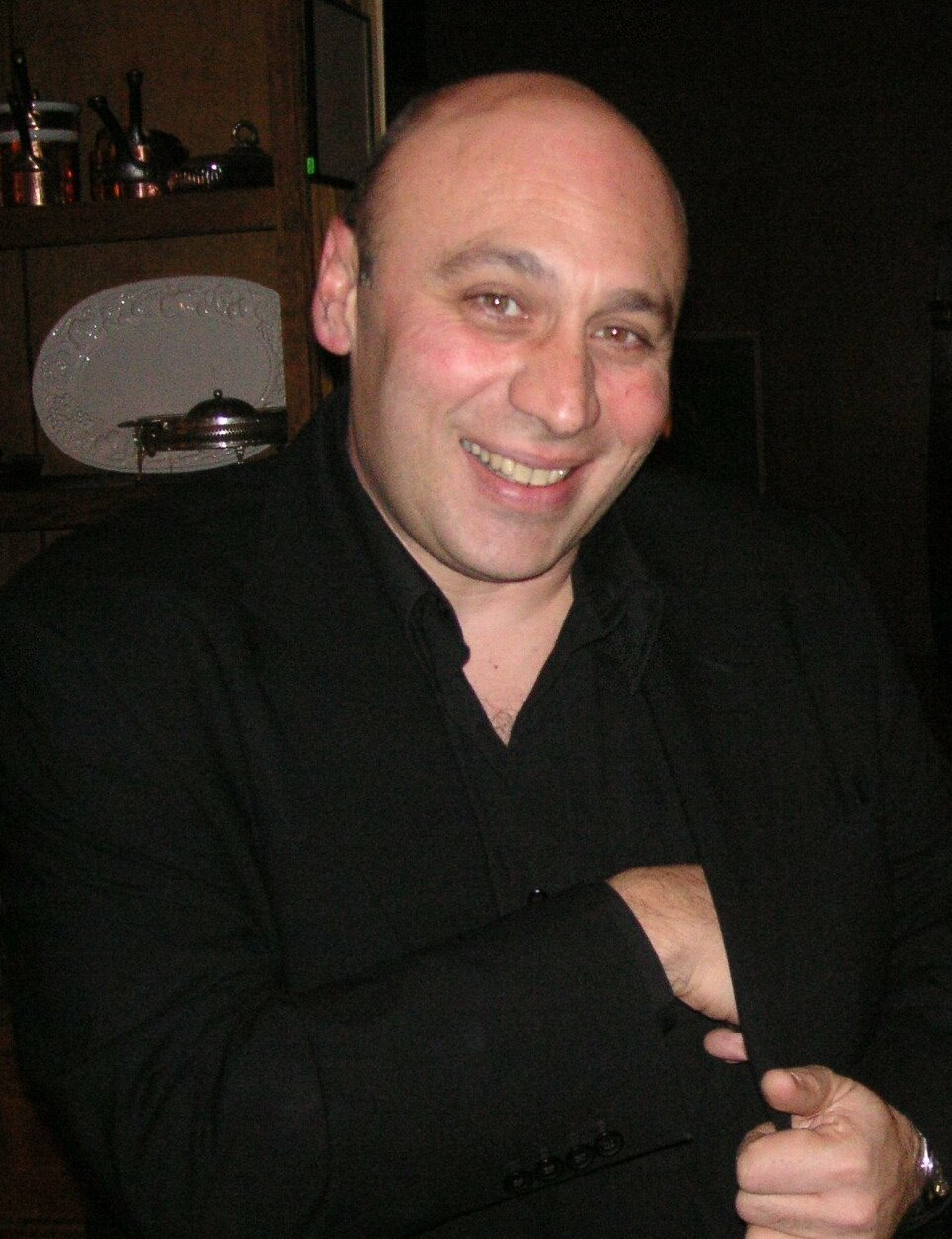
- Born: 18 July 1961 (age 63); Varna, Bulgaria
- Occupation: Actor

Krustyo Vasiiev Lafazanov (Bulgarian:Кръстю Василев Лафазанов) (born 18 July 1961) is a Bulgarian actor.

== Biography ==
Lafazanov was born in 1961 in Varna, Bulgaria. He speaks Russian, English and German. He finished his education in Krastyo Sarafov National Academy for Theatre and Film Arts. He plays in BTV and theater "Ivan Vazov" and others.

== Personal life ==
Lafazanov is married for Elena Nacheva. They met when Elena was a student. Together the family had one daughter, Elitza, and a son, Kristiyan.

== Movies ==
- The Judge(1986)
- Prohibited for adults(1987)
- I, the Countess(1989)
- The friends of Emilia(1996)
- 14 kisses(1997)
- Ice Dream(2005)

== Series ==
- Sea salt(2005)
- Great Bulgaria(2007)
- Sofia Residents in Excess(2011)
- Don't Worry About Me (2022)
