= Letter to America (film) =

2001 film by Iglika Trifonova

- Bulgarian: Писмо до Америка
- Directed by: Iglika Trifonova
- Screenplay by: Iglika Trifonova
- Produced by: Class film (Sofia); Phanta Vision (Amsterdam); Budapest Filmstudio
- Starring: Philip Avramov; Ana Papadopoulou; Peter Antonov; Joreta Nikolova
- Music by: Milcho Leviev
- Release date: 1 February 2001
- Running time: 99 minutes
- Countries: Bulgaria; Netherlands; Hungary; Germany
- Language: Bulgarian

Letter to America (Bulgarian: Писмо до Америка) is a 2001 Bulgarian film directed by Iglika Trifonova. It was Bulgaria's submission to the 73rd Academy Awards for the Academy Award for Best Foreign Language Film, but was not accepted as a nominee.

== See also ==
- Cinema of Bulgaria
- List of submissions to the 73rd Academy Awards for Best Foreign Language Film
- List of Bulgarian submissions for the Academy Award for Best International Feature Film
