= Closed by Prescription =

- Приключено по давност
- Directed by: Malina Petrova
- Written by: Malina Petrova
- Release date: 2008
- Country: Bulgaria

Closed by Prescription (Bulgarian: „Приключено по давност“, Priklyucheno po davnost; English: Statute of Limitations or Closed by Prescription) is a 2009 Bulgarian documentary, written and directed by Malina Petrova.

== Storyline ==
On the night of August 26, 1990, the headquarters of the Bulgarian Communist Party in Sofia, Bulgaria, was set on fire. For 15 years, the case was kept from the courts, and finally it was closed.

18 years later, in an attempt to uncover the truth, documentarian Malina Petrova presents the different perspectives of people directly or indirectly involved in the events.

The documentary invites the audience to become the jury in a trial that never took place.

== Awards ==
In 2009 the film was awarded the Prize of the Bulgarian National Film Archive at the XVII Documentary Film Festival.
