= Iglika Trifonova =

Bulgarian film director (born 1957)

Iglika Trifonova (born 17 February 1957; Bulgarian: Иглика Трифонова) is a Bulgarian film and theater director.

== Selected filmography ==
- 1990: Лето господне 1990, documentary
- 1992: Възможни разстояния, documentary
- 2001: Letter to America, debut feature film
- 2006: Investigation
- 2015:The Prosecutor, the Defender, the Father, and His Son
- 2017: Асансьор за пациенти

== Awards ==
- 2006: Her film Investigation received several awards at the Golden Rose Bulgarian Feature Film Festival
- 2016: Order of Saints Cyril and Methodius of 1st degree
