= Hristo Garbov =

Bulgarian actor (born 1957)

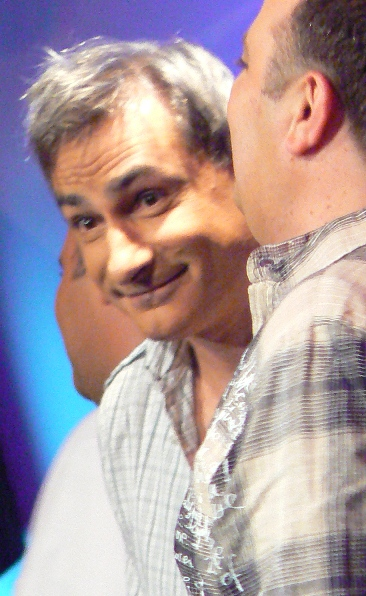
- Born: Hristo Viktorov Garbov; 23 September 1957 (age 68); Varna, Bulgaria
- Occupation: Actor
- Years active: 1981–present

Hristo Viktorov Garbov (Bulgarian: Христо Викторов Гърбов; born September 23, 1957) is a Bulgarian film and television actor. His career started in 1981.

== Biography ==
Hristo Garbov was born in Varna, Bulgaria. Hristo was a student at the Technical University in Varna and later transferred to the Krastyo Sarafov National Academy for Theatre and Film Arts. He married Iglika Trifonova (born 1957), Bulgarian film and theater director.

== Career ==
Hristo is an actor on the comedy show Comitzite on bTV. He acts in the series Sofia Residents in Excess.

== Filmography ==
- Letaloto (1981) - as role of Sirachko
- Orisiya (1983)
- Chernite lebedi (1984)
- Stepni hora (1986) - as role of Ivan
- Sasedkata (1988)
- Slyapa sabota (1988) - as role of Kosta Bikov
- Ivan and Alexandra (1989)
- Byagashti kucheta (1989)
- Journey to Jerusalem (2003)
