= Saadet Aksoy =

Turkish actress (born 1983)

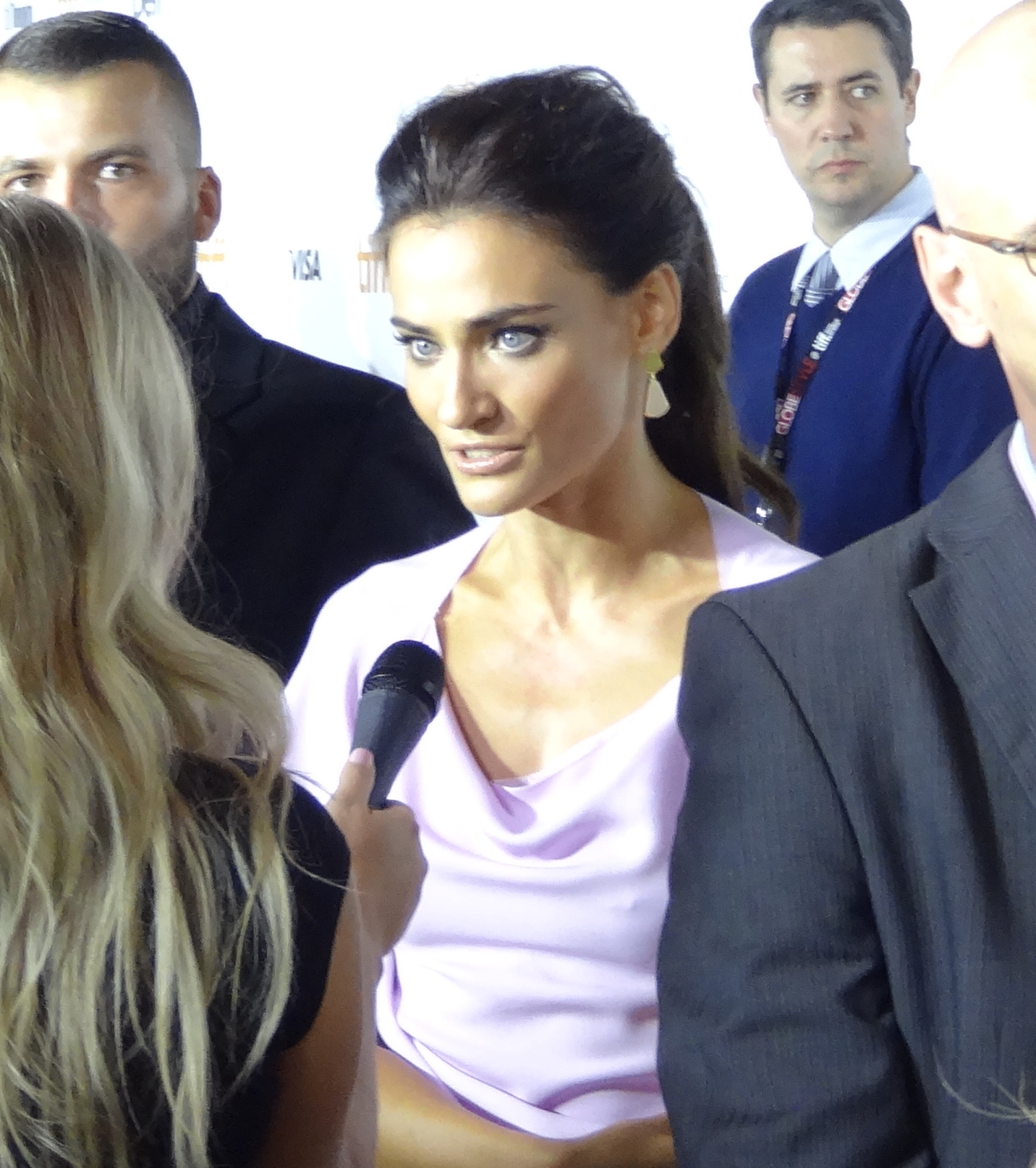
- Aksoy at the 2012 Toronto International Film Festival
- Born: Saadet Işıl Aksoy; 29 August 1983 (age 42); Istanbul, Turkey
- Education: Boğaziçi University
- Occupation: Actress
- Years active: 2003–present
- Known for: Twice Born
- Spouse: Pamir Kıraner (m. 2014)
- Children: 1
- Website: saadetaksoy.com

Saadet Işıl Aksoy (Turkish: [saaːˈdet akˈsoj]; born 29 August 1983) is a Turkish actress, who received critical acclaim with her portrayal of Aska, a red-haired punk trumpet player in Italian actor-director Sergio Castellitto's film Twice Born, in which she co-starred with Penélope Cruz and Emile Hirsch. Christy Lemire described her as "the striking Saadet Aksoy" in her Twice Born review, and film critic David Rooney stated, "Saadet Aksoy brings a subdued fieriness to her scenes as a Bosnian woman" in The Hollywood Reporter. In his article on Variety, Boyd Van Hoeij wrote, "Turkish thesp Saadet Aksoy impresses in a supporting role as a spunky Yugoslav local" about her performance in Twice Born.

Sergio Castellitto explained his first encounter with Aksoy in an article on Vogue Turkey with these words: "Saadet, the first time I met you it was through the internet. I had accidentally 'fallen' on a movie trailer. I actually don't remember anything of that trailer, of that movie. Yet I remember that I saw a woman turning her head abruptly to the camera, her blue eyes burning everything in that framing, blasting the reverse shot."

Her recent performance as Remziye in the 2018 movie Saf was described on Filmuforia as "SAF is carried forward by the sheer brilliance of Saadet Isil Aksoy whose Remziye acts in an enlightened and humanitarian way when the chips are down." In his article about Saf on The Film Stage, Jared Mobarak wrote: "Aksoy carries the rest of the film through an authentic progression from indignation to shame and ultimately to clarity.

Saadet Aksoy has been in the juries of such film festivals as Cairo International Film Festival, Sarajevo Film Festival and Istanbul Film Festival. She became the spokesperson for L'Oreal Paris in Turkey in the year 2013.

== Early life ==
Aksoy was born in Istanbul to İnci Aksoy, a retired chief police inspector, and Anıl Aksoy, a retired police chief. She talks about the strong female figures in her family in an interview saying: "My mom and grandma have been my two role models. Both have stood out in life not only with their physical beauty but they have also been successful in their careers and been respected in life thanks to their identities and personalities." Her grandmother Münire Şahinbaş was one of the first female business magnates in Turkey.

Aksoy has two older brothers. In an interview she described her childhood and what cinema meant for her even at a young age: "There were always certain rules in the family. Even though my brothers and I were having so much fun together, I was also quite introverted. Movies were what took me away to completely different lands, and cinema has always amazed me since my childhood."

She takes her first name Saadet from her paternal grandmother who died before she was born. The word saadet means 'bliss' in English.

== Education and career ==
Saadet Aksoy studied English language and literature at Boğaziçi University in Istanbul. She took part in such TV projects in Turkey as Güz Yangını, Esir Kalpler, Senden Başka, Kalpsiz Adam, Sınıf, Balkan Düğünü and Muhteşem Yüzyıl. Her theatre appearances include the Turkish version of Steel Magnolias staged by the theatre director Mehmet Ergen and the Turkish version of Shoot/Get Treasure/Repeat originally written by British playwright Mark Ravenhill.

She made her film debut with Semih Kaplanoğlu's Egg, which premiered at Directors' Fortnight at Cannes Film Festival in 2007 bringing her several awards at many film festivals such as Valdivia International Film Festival and Sarajevo Film Festival. In 2008, she took part in the following film by Semih Kaplanoğlu, Milk, which was at Venice Film Festival Official Selection. She later worked with Argentinian director Alejandro Chomski in A Beautiful Life, and in 2009, she was in Bulgarian director Kamen Kalev's Eastern Plays, which premiered also at Directors' Fortnight at Cannes Film Festival. Film critic Jay Weissberg praised her performance in Eastern Plays in his article on Variety saying, "All performances are strong, but it's Christov and Aksoy who linger in the memory."

Her 2009 Turkish film Love in Another Language brought her other Best Actress awards at Ankara International Film Festival and Bursa Silk Road Film Festival. Again in 2009, she took part in the Istanbul scene of The Rebound with Catherine Zeta Jones and Justin Bartha by the director Bart Freundlich. Her international breakthrough was after she co-starred with Penélope Cruz and Emile Hirsch in Sergio Castellitto's Twice Born adapted from the novel with the same title by Margaret Mazzantini. The movie premiered at Toronto International Film Festival in 2012. In 2013, Aksoy played a Greek girl Eleni in the Turkish movie Sürgün and in 2015, Rania in Ragion di Stato directed by Marco Pontecorvo for Italian TV network RAI.

Aksoy's latest projects include Saf by Ali Vatansever, which premiered at the Toronto International Film Festival in 2018, Passed by Censor by Serhat Karaaslan, which was released in 2019, and Iguana Tokyo by Kaan Müjdeci, recently in post-production.

In mid-2025, Aksoy landed the female lead opposite actor Serkan Çayoğlu in the third season of the historical fiction series Mehmed: Fetihler Sultanı as the character of Gülbahar Hatun, replacing actress Esila Umut, who formerly portrayed the role in the previous two seasons.

== Filmography ==
=== Film ===
Year	Title	Role	Notes
2007	Egg	Ayla	Directors' Fortnight
2008	Milk	Semra	Venice Film Festival
2008	A Beautiful Life	Denise	
2009	Eastern Plays	Işıl	Directors' Fortnight
2009	Love in Another Language	Zeynep	
2009	The Rebound	Turkish girl in Istanbul	
2012	Twice Born	Aska	Toronto International Film Festival
2013	Sürgün	Eleni	
2018	Ailecek Şaşkınız	Elif	
2018	Saf	Remziye	Toronto International Film Festival
2019	Passed by Censor	Selma	
2019	Iguana Tokyo		
2025	Confidante	Arzu/Sabiha	

=== Television ===
Year	Title	Role	Notes
2005	Güz Yangını	Pınar	
2006	Esir Kalpler	İrem	
2007	Senden Başka	Elif	
2008	Kalpsiz Adam	Feraye	
2008	Sınıf	Duygu	
2009	Balkan Düğünü	Zehra	
2011	Muhteşem Yüzyıl	Victoria (Sadıka)	
2014	Ragion di Stato	Rania	
2016	Kördüğüm	Eylül	
2017	Vatanım Sensin	Lucy	
2024	Shahmaran	Lilith	
2024	Asaf	Rüya	
2024	Mehmed: Fetihler Sultanı	Gulbahar Hatun	

== Awards ==
Year	Organisation	Award	Work	Result
2007	Sarajevo Film Festival	Best Actress	Egg	Won
2007	Antalya Golden Orange Film Festival	Best Newcomer	Egg	Won
2007	Valdivia International Film Festival	Best Actress	Egg	Won
2008	Siyad Awards	Best Actress in a Leading Role	Egg	Won
2008	Yeşilçam Film Awards	Young Talent	Egg	Won
2008	Ankara International Film Festival	Best Female Newcomer	Egg	Won
2008	İsmail Dümbüllü Awards	Best Film Actress	Egg	Won
2009	Ankara International Film Festival	Best Actress	Love in Another Language	Won
2009	Bursa Silk Road Film Festival	Best Actress	Love in Another Language	Won
2019	Ankara International Film Festival	Best Actress	Saf	Won
