= Fikri Karayel =

Turkish-Cypriot singer (born 1987)

- Born: 7 February 1987 (age 39); Zodeia, Cyprus
- Origin: Turkish Cypriot
- Genres: Rock
- Occupations: Singer, songwriter
- Years active: 2014–present
- Label: Dokuz Sekiz Müzik

Fikri Karayel (born 7 February 1987) is a Turkish Cypriot rock singer and songwriter.

== Biography ==
He was born in Zodeia, Cyprus, where he lived throughout his childhood. He was named after his grandfather, Fikri Karayel, a popular sportsman after whom the local primary school and Fikri Karayel Stadium were named. He was inspired and helped by the local band SOS, and he quickly developed a passion for music. He started singing at the fifth year of the primary school and had his first performance to a broad audience at the Orange Festival of Morphou. He went on to study biochemistry at the Kingston University; meanwhile, he joined the band Refik and started composing songs that became popular. He performed before concerts of Turkish bands such as Duman and thus developed a Turkish Cypriot fan base, during this time, he became known in Turkey as Haluk Levent performed one of his songs.

His first popular song was "Şehit" ("Martyr"). "Trenler" ("Trains"), "Hayal Edemezsin" ("You Can't Imagine") and "Morgue" ("Morg") are other popular songs by Karayel; "Hayal Edemezsin" was especially a great hit in Turkey as it became very popular among alternative music listeners, remaining at number 1 on Myspace Turkey for two years. In 2014, he performed the soundtrack for the Turkish-Turkish Cypriot movie Seni Seviyorum Adamım ("I Love You Man") and received the best singer award from the Near East University. In 2015, he released his first album, Zor Zamanlar ("Hard Times") and gave his first concert in Istanbul, Turkey.

== Discography ==
=== Studio albums ===
==== Zor Zamanlar (2014) ====
| # | Title | Length |
|---|---|---|
| 1 | Zor Zamanlar | 5:27 |
| 2 | Döner Başa | 3:26 |
| 3 | Beni Bırakma | 4:09 |
| 4 | Hayal Edemezsin | 3:17 |
| 5 | Senden | 1:38 |
| 6 | Senden Sonra | 4:04 |
| 7 | Küçük Kardeşim | 3:23 |
| 8 | Morg | 4:49 |
| 9 | Vazgeçilmez | 4:26 |
| 10 | Keyfinin Kahyası | 4:05 |
| 11 | Bir Gün | 4:55 |
| 12 | Trenler | 3:18 |

==== Uzaktan (2021) ====
| # | Title | Length |
|---|---|---|
| 1 | Uzaktan | 4:18 |
| 2 | Ne Güzel Oldu | 4:08 |
| 3 | Karanlıkta | 2:47 |
| 4 | Acilen Aşka İhtiyacımız Var | 3:13 |
| 5 | Tutkunum | 2:44 |
| 6 | Kahkahalar | 2:57 |
| 7 | Bitmezse Kış | 3:19 |
| 8 | Bir Şey Var (Demo Version) | 3:15 |
| 9 | İyi Geliyor | 3:31 |

=== Singles ===
| Release | Title | Featured artist | Label | Genre | Length | Notes |
|---|---|---|---|---|---|---|
| 23 March 2018 | Yol | Tolga Erzurumlu | Dokuz Sekiz Müzik | Pop | 4:14 | |
| 22 November 2018 | Yorgunum Çok | —N/a | Dokuz Sekiz Müzik | Pop | 3:11 | |
| 13 September 2019 | Bir Şey Var | —N/a | Dokuz Sekiz Müzik | Pop | 4:04 | |
| 28 February 2020 | Öl De Öleyim | —N/a | Dokuz Sekiz Müzik | Pop | 4:29 | |
| 17 April 2020 | İyi Geliyor | —N/a | Dokuz Sekiz Müzik | Pop | 3:58 | |
| 12 February 2021 | Bitmezse Kış | —N/a | Dokuz Sekiz Müzik | Pop | 3:19 | |
| 25 June 2021 | Ne Güzel Oldu | —N/a | Dokuz Sekiz Müzik | Pop | 4:08 | |

=== Songs written ===
| Release | Title | Artist | Album | Songwriter | Notes |
|---|---|---|---|---|---|
| 6 May 2011 | Bazı Günler | Haluk Levent | Karagöz Ve Hacivat | Fikri Karayel | |
| 09 July 2018 | Zor Kurtarmışım | Genco Ecer | Zor Kurtarmışım | Fikri Karayel | |
| 23 March 2018 | Yol | Fikri Karayel | —N/a | Fikri Karayel | |
| 24 May 2019 | Konumuz Var | Merve Özbey | Devran | Fikri Karayel | |
| 19 July 2019 | Aşk Bu | Murat Boz | —N/a | Fikri Karayel | |
| 18 October 2019 | Efsane | Ayşe Hatun Önal | —N/a | Fikri Karayel | |
