= Nasekomix =

Bulgarian music group

- Origin: Sofia, Bulgaria
- Genres: Indie rock, trip hop, experimental music
- Years active: 2001–present
- Labels: Nasekomix, Art Eternal, ILs
- Members: Andronia Popova (Roni); Michail Yossifov; George Donchev; Alexander Daniel (Sandi)
- Past members: Todor Karastojanov (tkrst); Alexander Yanev

Nasekomix (Насекомикс) was a Bulgarian musical group from Sofia. Their style could be described as an avantgarde minimalistic mixture of electronic music, jazz-rock, punk, indie, fusion' and trip-hop. The group themselves define it as 'melodramatic pop' with drum and bass and electronica influences.

The band's name is a portmanteau of the Bulgarian words nasekomo (insect) and komix (comics).

== Beginning ==
The band was established in 2001 by Andronia "Roni" Popova (Monday Morning), Alexander Yanev (ex Panican Whyasker), Todor "tkrst" Karastoyanov (ex Animacionerite) and Michail Yossifov (Vendetta, SkinFlick, B.F.D.M.). The reason for the assembly was an invitation from a youth music festival in Padua, Italia, received by Monday Morning but rejected by the members apart from Roni, who urgently gathered a new group. Later on Nasekomix were joined by Alexander "Sandi" Daniel (drums, Ambient Anarchist) and George Donchev (electric upright bass, double bass) while Alexander Yanev and tkrst left the band.

== Backgrounds ==
Andronia Popova's background includes graduation of piano and classical singing in secondary school and later art-management in the NBU and vocal pedagogy in the Sofia University, which led to acceptance in the prestigious Mannes College of Music in New York; she failed to graduate due to lack of money to sustain living in New York.

George Donchev studied jazz in the Berklee College of Music, U.S. and had played with famous performers as Nigel Kennedy.

== Discography ==
The band has digitally produced one multimedia album, Insectomix, with the single 'gradAD', meanwhile gathering popularity with the songs 'Inject me with Love' and 'Lady Song' included in the soundtrack of the critically acclaimed film Eastern Plays by Kamen Kalev.

Toward the end of 2009 Nasekomix released their first studio recording LP Adam's Bushes, Eva's Deep, produced by the band in collaboration with the English producer Ilian Walker (a.k.a. DJ iLS) and Anguel Christanov (Art Eternal production house). The album was praised by the critics and soon acquired popularity.

== Concerts ==
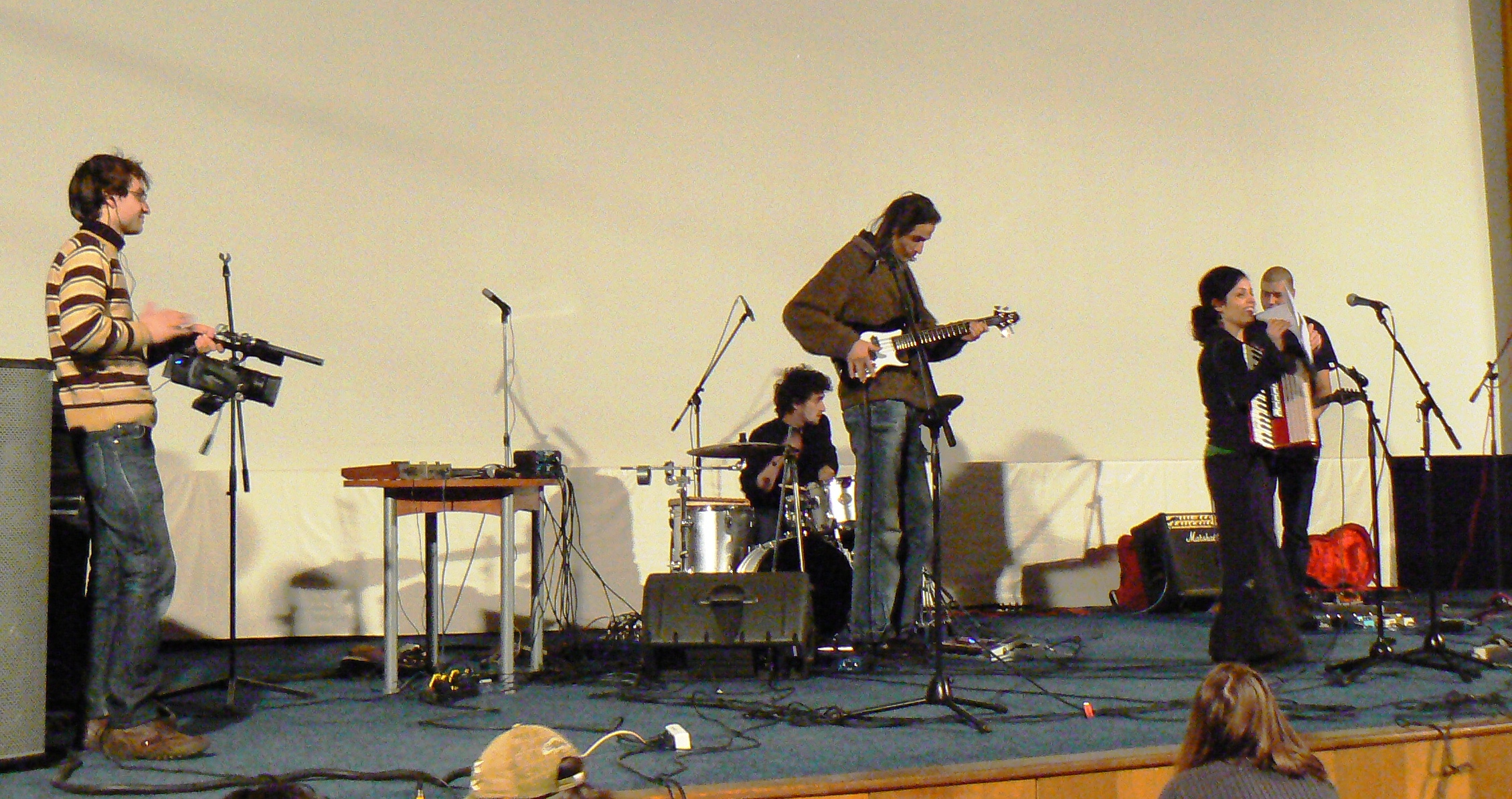
Nasekomix on stage, Cinema House, Sofia, 3 February 2010

Nasekomix have toured with plenty of concerts in Bulgaria but mainly abroad: Italy, France, Spain, Poland.

In 2009 the band performed at the première of Eastern Plays at the Sarajevo Film Festival and the Cannes Film Festival. In March 2010 the band performed for the Paris première of Eastern Plays, and soon afterward participated in the Viennese Balkan Fever Festival 2010 (feminin), having a concert in the OST club, Vienna.

In March 2010 the group toured in concert in Bulgaria: in Varna, Veliko Tarnovo, Rousse, Plovdiv and Sofia.

== Members ==
- Andronia Popova (Roni) — vocals, accordion, keyboards
- Michail Yossifov – guitar, keyboards, backing vocals
- George Donchev — electric upright bass, double bass
- Alexander Daniel (Sandi) — drums

Ex members:

- Todor Karastojanov (tkrst) — keyboards, drums
- Alexander Yanev

Lyrics:

- Mariy Rosen (Help me Jones)
- Andronia Popova (Roni)
