= Carpe Diem (Hande Yener album) =

Studio album by Hande Yener
- Released: 2 October 2020
- Recorded: 2018–2020
- Genre: Pop; electronic
- Length: 35:34
- Label: Poll
- Producer: Polat Yağcı

Hande Yener chronology
| Hepsi Hit Vol. 2 (2017) | Carpe Diem (2020) | Afrodizyak (2023) |

Carpe Diem is the fourteenth studio album by Turkish singer Hande Yener. The first part, Carpe Diem Part I, which contains 10 songs in total, was released on 2 October 2020 by Poll Production. Eight of the songs in the album were written and arranged by Berksan and Misha, while one was prepared by Fikri Karayel and Deeperise, and another by Mete Özgencil and Devrim Karaoğlu. Carpe Diem is a pop and electronic album that also has elements of synth-pop, funky house, deep house and R&B. Unlike Yener's previous works, the eight songs prepared by Berksan were first composed and lyrics were later put on them. Yener explained that she named the album based on the philosophy of "living at the moment, knowing the value of the moment" and then a song with the same name was written and included in the tracking list. The album was set to be released in April 2020 but due to the COVID-19 pandemic, the release date was postponed. It eventually became available in October 2020.

The album received positive feedback from music critics who praised Yener's ability in "renewing herself" and added that the work "surpasses the current typical pop sound". In the first week following its release, Carpe Diem ranked first on D&R's list of best-selling albums and topped the iTunes Turkey chart. The album's first music video was directed by Aytekin Yalçın for the song "Carpe Diem" and released on the same day as the album. The second music video, also directed by Yalçın, was made for the track "Aşk Sandım".

== Background ==
Between 2016 and 2017, Yener produced and released the Hepsi Hit album, which was divided into two volumes (Vol 1. and Vol 2.), and released over the course of two years. After Hepsi Hit Vol 2., she released the single "Beni Sev" in 2018. Meanwhile, she was featured as a guest artist on the tribute albums Yıldız Tilbe'nin Yıldızlı Şarkıları and Alakasız Şarkılar, Vol. 2. Yener also released two English singles, titled "Love Always Wins" and "Gravity" respectively. Additionally, she began preparations for an album to mark the 20th year of her career, and in 2019 released the electronic pop single "Aşk Tohumu", as well as the songs "Krema" and "Kuş".

Yener announced in 2019 that she was preparing an album to celebrate the 20th year of her career. She added that the album would be "innovative pop, far from the standard 130 BPM tempo". She later announced that the new album would be titled Carpe Diem, to emphasize "living in the moment, knowing the value of the moment". It was later made known that artists such as Berksan, Devrim Karaoğlu, Mete Özgencil, Mabel Matiz, Fikri Karayel, Deeperise and Misha would collaborate with her on preparing the album. Yener later added that the new album would be an "upgraded" version of her 2006 electronic pop album Apayrı.

== Development and recording ==
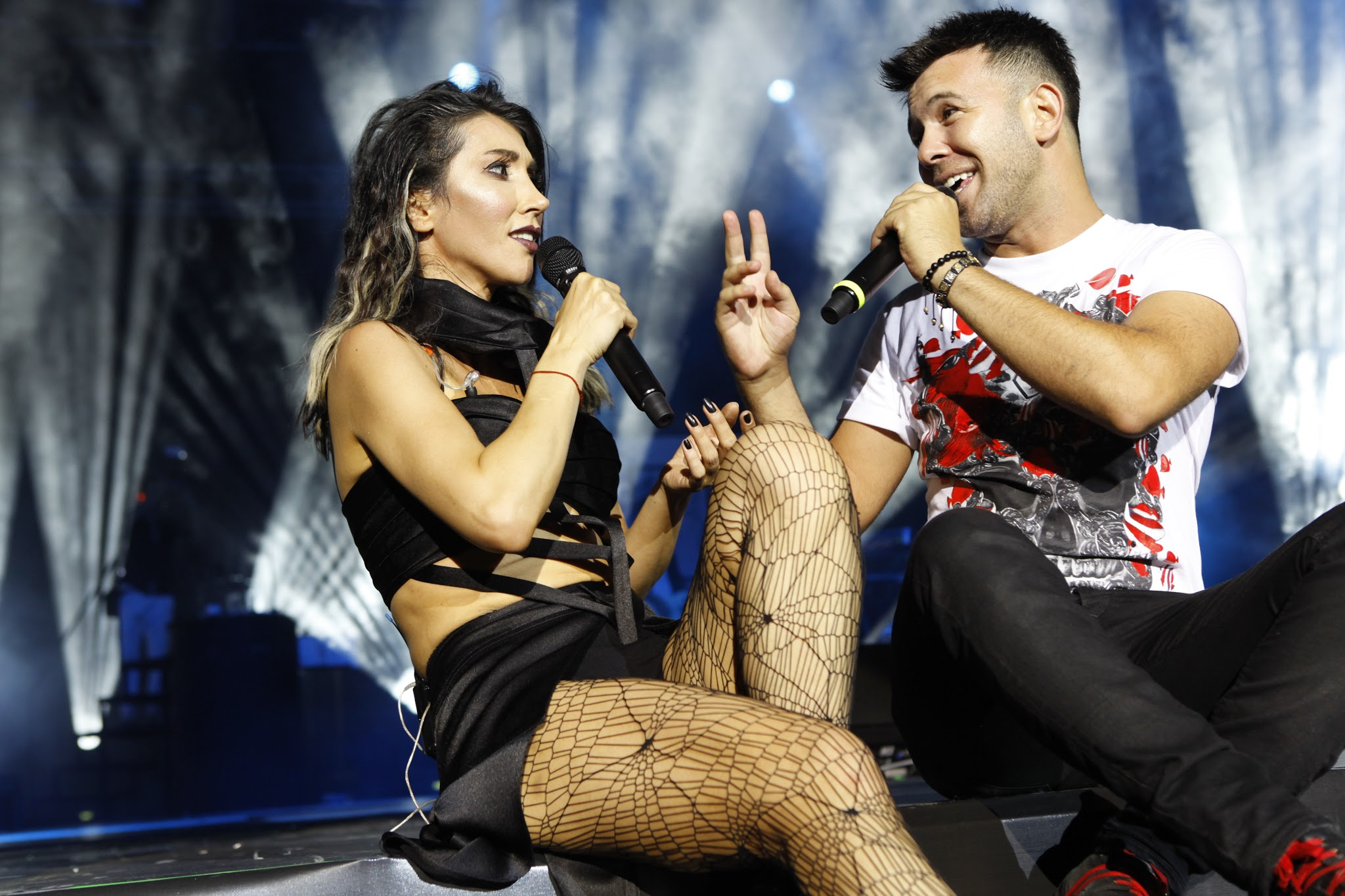
Berksan, who wrote Yener's 2013 song "Ya Ya Ya Ya", wrote eight out of the ten tracks on Carpe Diem.

After the album was released, Yener explained the development process of the album in an interview with Radio Başakşehir on 2 October 2020. She stated that they stayed in the studio with Misha and Berksan before and during the pandemic, and recorded the songs in her home studio as soon as they were written, and that she did not want to use too many effects on her vocals. With ten songs ready in hand, she decided to postpone the release of the album. She said that as the pandemic lasted longer than expected, she added five more songs to the album and named the album as "Carpe Diem" and that a song with the same name was written on Berksan's suggestion. She added that Aytekin Yalçın shot the preview videos, which she shared on social media to promote the album, and full music videos were also recorded for a number of tracks. In the interview she gave on Kafa Radio the same day, she explained the production process of the album as follows:

"In fact, I think one of the most important reasons for the integrity of this album is that we wrote songs on the arrangements. We did not write songs and then arrange them, work was done on the sounds we liked. [...] When composing, the arrangement inevitably limits you, but since we did the opposite, we worked very freely."

For the twentieth year of her music career, she said she thought "ten songs wouldn't be enough, she should have done twenty". She added that she was constantly updating her repertoire after the decision to postpone the album, and in the meantime released the track "Bela" as a single in July. She mentioned she thought the second part of the album would be released after the audience had formed a bond with Carpe Diem Part I. She also stated that the second part is still in the process of being developed and that she can add or remove a new song or try a different style at any time. In an interview with Aleyna Horasan on Radio Mega on 7 October 2020, she talked about the album production process. She said that she met Misha through Deeperise's long collaborator Jabbar, so she listened and chose some of his compositions and infrastructures. Deeperise and Fikri Karayel wrote and composed the song "Aşk Elinde", giving it to Yener who later decided to include it in the album. Yener also added that the track "Boşuna" was recorded together with her single "Beni Sev" in 2018, but she had set it aside to be included in her future album.

Yener stated that besides preparing this album entirely in a home studio, she sang each song once during the album recording, and did not use too many effects on the vocals as the original compositions and sounds were sufficient. She also mentioned that for Part II there would be songs written by herself in the tracking list.

== Title and cover ==
Carpe diem, which means "make the day, enjoy the day, seize the day, live the moment or live the day" in Latin, became Yener's "motto" in this album and the album's title was eventually announced as Carpe Diem. She said she chose this name because it emphasized on "living in the moment, knowing the value of the moment". In an interview with Hürriyet she talked about the album and her choice of name:

I invite everyone to live in the moment. I also had times that I missed the moment in pursuit of other things. But this situation has now created awareness in me. I think I am starting to awaken myself. I also feel that I share the things I have experienced. The songs in the album will also make people turn to themselves. This album can be a good guide for those looking for happiness.

After naming the album as Carpe Diem, she said that it was Berksan who insisted on including a track with the same name in the album, and it was him who eventually wrote the track.

She released the album cover on social media on 11 September 2020. Yener, sitting on a chair in front of a white wall, posed for the cover wearing a one-piece black leather outfit and a black Sombrero-style hat, black high-heeled shoes and braided hair stretching to the floor. The album styling and the style on the cover photo were entrusted to Italian designer Gabriele Papi. Aytekin Yalçın took the album photos and cover photo. Regarding the album photos and cover style, Yener said: "My director Aytekin Yalçın was aware of all the developments of the album. I was sending him every new piece we made. Aytekin was sending me drawings and ideas from Italy with stylist Gabriele Papi. Those drawings increased my excitement a lot. Because it was so suited to the energy of the album. The shootings were completed very smoothly, just like the album recordings. We knew very well what we wanted and didn't want. We shot in Milan, Istanbul and Marmaris bays."

Carpe Diem's cover photo was censored on Iranian music platforms upon its release on 9 October. The album was put up for sale with an image that completely erased Yener in the cover photo and left it blank.

== Music and lyrics ==
Carpe Diem is a pop and electronic album with elements of synth-pop, funky house, deep house and R&B. The album's first track, "Aşk Sandım", features synth-pop and rock elements. The second track, "Bulut", which has "the 80's synthwave and retro tune" has a prodominant guitar sound in its infrastructure. The third track, "Senden Çok", is a synth-pop themed song with a repeating bass line. "Aşk Elinde", written and composed by Fikri Karayel and Deeperise is a dance sing. The fifth track, "Başka Dudaklar", is a Garage house-themed song with more dynamic electronic sounds. The sixth track, "Boşuna", is one of the two tracks not written by Berksan. Written by Mete Özgencil, it is a ballad song. The title track of the album as well as its lead single, "Carpe Diem", also known as "Anı Yaşa", is a track with a medium rhythm. The eighth track, "Melekler ve Şeytanlar", is a high tempo electro-pop song. The critically acclaimed ninth mid-tempo track, "Kaç", was defined by critics as "the combination of all the styles that Yener has tried in her music career". The closing track, "Yolcu", has a trap-pop style.

== Release ==
The album's first promotional single, "Pencere", was released with its music video on 28 March 2020. The song entered national music charts and was also appreciated by the critics for "reflecting on the current social events". A second single, titled "Bela", was released on 3 July 2020. The song ranked second on the official Turkish music chart.

On 12 September 2020, the album's over photo and release date were shared on social media. It was announced that the album would have ten songs and would be released on 2 October 2020. The title of various songs from the album were announced in the subsequent days, including "Aşk Sandım", "Senden Çok", "Carpe Diem", "Kaç", "Aşk Elinde" and "Boşuna". The whole track listing was announced on 14 September 2020 on Instagram. Yener also announced a second album, containing ten more songs, would be released in the near future. On 29 September, Yener shared pictures of the album's package on Instagram. The album was divided into two parts, with Carpe Diem Part I being released in early October 2020. On 2 October 2020, Carpe Diem was made available on streaming platforms and its physical copies were sold in stores across Turkey. The singles "Pencere" and "Bela" were not included in this portion of the album. Carpe Diem was initially set to be released in April but the date was postponed due to the COVID-19 pandemic. In her interview with the Posta newspaper, she stated that her plan was to release the album in 2020: "I always listen to the voice of my heart. My core listeners were waiting for my 20th year album. So even if the world burned, I would release this album."

Regarding when Carpe Diem Part II would be released, Yener said "I think it should come out at a surprising time. It may not be right to give a date. I'm guessing 2021, but I can surprise you. Let everyone get confused. Let me increase the excitement a little bit."

== Critical reception ==
The album was praised by music critics. Mayk Şişman from Milliyet newspaper wrote a positive review about the album. Praising the infrastructure and drawing particular attention to some songs, Şişman wrote, "Carpe Diem, the best quality work of Hande Yener in the last 10 years, is one of the most concrete proofs of why Yener is / remains in the 'Giants League' in Turkish pop. Yener managed to publish what befits one more time by keeping her music alive." Onur Baştürk from Hürriyet newspaper made the following comment, praising the background and lyrics of the album: "Hande Yener seems to have completely recovered from the days when she was buried in the typical Turkish pop waters (worst example: her Kışkış single) with this wonderful album that she celebrates the 20th anniversary of her career with." Hikmet Demirkol from the same newspaper wrote a review in which he praised Yener's choice of electronic style for the album, and added: "I have multiple favorites in Carpe Diem, but for me, 'Başka Dudaklar' and 'Melekler ve Şeytanlar' are the first two specials. I went back to the time of Biraz Özgürlük maxi single with these songs; they are awesome." Again, Sinem Vural from the same newspaper left a positive comment on the album and wrote "It has filtered everything that draws attention in the music industry very well and created an album that appeals to all general tastes." Serhat Tekin from the same newspaper also commented on the album's success and wrote, "Carpe Diem showed its effect on music lovers with the speed of light. Its success in streaming and downloading rates in the lists, and the fact that its name is at the top of the most searched albums and songs are indicative of the great interest among the audience." Uğur Alkapar, from Posta newspaper, praised Carpe Diem and left a positive review about its lyrics: "Carpe Diem is a work far beyond the Turkish pop lines we are accustomed to with its visual integrity and world-class songs. Berksan, who has his signature in the lyrics of many of the pieces, has also surpassed himself. [...] We have been expecting such an album from Hande Yener since Apayrı in 2006. Destiny had it set for the 20th year of her career."

Esin Övet from Habertürk newspaper praised the album and wrote the following in his column: "First, the album is serious in terms of integrity and has a story. While creating its story, they worked with a free spirit on it. It feels seriously serious." Aslıhan Akdağ Türker from Yeni Birlik newspaper praised the album and wrote, "It was full of electronic pop music elements as well as samba instruments and completed with beautiful melodies. Hande Yener has not left us without music since the first day of the pandemic. I really congratulate her for her courage and success. Could it be better? I don't think so ... ". Berk Mühürdaroğlu from the same newspaper evaluated the album with a positive review and wrote, "Hande Yener's new album is an indication that she will initiate a new style in music. Yener, who has always competed with herself for 20 years, proves that she is the Empress of the 21st-century musical understanding with her album Carpe Diem." GZone magazine, examining Carpe Diem Part I in detail, praised Yener's vocals and Misha's production: "Yener, who has raised her musical talent while bouncing between genres over the years and manages to impress us with her magnificent voice every time, is not surprising us here either. The other important player of the album is producer Misha. Misha is the person who made Yener's comeback sound extremely subtle in terms of sound; especially in the first three songs that open the album, he did such a fun job that he managed to turn Yener into a cool rockstar rather than a popstar." Hakan Kanburoğlu from Yeni Çağrı newspaper said, "Hande Yener has made a wonderful album. She did not compromise on quality in a 35-minute album. She put aside commercial concerns, threw away the taboos of simple pop music. It is a work of courage to make such an album in 2020."

== Promotion ==
To promote her upcoming album, Yener released the single "Pencere" together with its music video on 28 March 2020. On 3 July 2020, another single titled "Bela" was released. She performed the latter at the 2020 Golden Butterfly Awards. In September, Yener released short clips recorded for each of the album's songs on her Instagram account. The album became available for preorder on 29 September 2020. On the night of 1 October, Yener opened a live broadcast on Instagram five minutes before the album was released on streaming platforms on the Internet and performed the track "Senden Çok" at home, and when the broadcast ended, the album was released online. The first music video was shot for the song "Carpe Diem" and directed by Aytekin Yalçın. The video was recorded in Italy and Yener's choice of outfits was discussed by the press. The work of Italian stylist Gabriele Papi on Yener's overall style and appearance was also praised by critics. The second music video, "Aşk Sandım", was again directed by Yalçın and released on 21 November 2020. For the 2021 New Year's Eve, Yener appeared on the TV program İbo Show and performed her past hits, including "Ya Ya Ya Ya", "Kelepçe", and "Emrine Amade", as well as the song "Aşk Sandım" from her new album. On 14 February 2021, she released the third music video from the album, "Boşuna", which was directed by Gülşen Aybaba.

== Track listing ==
Credits are taken from the notes available on the Tidal platform.

| No. | Title | Writer(s) | Composer(s) | Length |
|---|---|---|---|---|
| 1. | "Aşk Sandım" | Berksan Özer | Misha Michael Mehdikhan; Berksan Özer | 04:01 |
| 2. | "Bulut" | Özer | Mehdikhan | 03:20 |
| 3. | "Senden Çok" | Özer | Özer | 03:15 |
| 4. | "Aşk Elinde" | Fikri Karayel | Deeperise | 04:36 |
| 5. | "Başka Dudaklar" | Özer | Özer | 04:05 |
| 6. | "Boşuna" | Devrim Karaoğlu; Mete Özgencil | Karaoğlu | 03:53 |
| 7. | "Carpe Diem" | Özer | Özer | 02:39 |
| 8. | "Melekler ve Şeytanlar" | Özer | Mehdikhan; Özer | 04:03 |
| 9. | "Kaç" | Özer | Mehdikhan; Özer | 02:45 |
| 10. | "Yolcu" | Özer | Özer | 02:59 |
| Total length: | | | | 35:34 |

== Personnel ==
- Production: Poll Production
- Producer: Polat Yağcı
- Songwriters: Berksan (1, 2, 3, 5, 7, 8, 9, 10), Fikri Karayel (4), Devrim Karaoğlu (6), Mete Özgencil (6)
- Composers: Berksan (1, 3, 5, 7, 8, 9, 10), Misha (1, 2, 8, 9), Fikri Karayel (4), Devrim Karaoğlu (6)
- Music director: Misha
- Mastering: Çağlar Türkmen
- Art director and photographer: Aytekin Yalçın
- Stylist: Gabriele Papi
- Hair: Giuseppe Lorusso
- Makeup: Serena Congiu
- Graphic design: Ahmet Terzioğlu

== Charts ==
| Chart (2020) | Peak position |
|---|---|
| Turkey (D&R Best-Selling) | 1 |

== Release history ==
| Country | Date | Format(s) | Label | Ref. |
|---|---|---|---|---|
| Turkey | 2 October 2020 | CD · digital download | Poll | |
| Worldwide | 2 October 2020 | Digital download | Poll | |
