= Karayel =

Karayel is a surname of Turkish origin, meaning "northwest wind". Notable people with the surname include:

- Bekir Karayel (born 1982), Turkish middle and long-distance runner
- Cebrail Karayel (born 1994), Turkish footballer
- Emre Karayel (born 1972), Turkish actor and TV presenter
- Fikri Karayel (born 1987), Turkish Cypriot rock singer and songwriter
- Öykü Karayel (born 1990), Turkish actress

== See also ==
- Poyraz Karayel, Turkish drama television series
- Vestel Karayel, a surveillance, reconnaissance, and combat unmanned aerial vehicle
