= Afrodizyak =

Studio album by Hande Yener
- Released: 23 June 2023
- Recorded: 2022–2023
- Genre: Pop; funky house; R&B
- Length: 42:44
- Label: Poll
- Producer: Polat Yağcı

Hande Yener chronology
Carpe Diem (2020)	Afrodizyak (2023)

Singles from Afrodizyak
- 1. "Benden Bir Tane Daha Yok" Released: 20 January 2023

Afrodizyak (Aphrodisiac) is the fifteenth studio album by Turkish singer Hande Yener. It was released on 23 June 2023 by Poll Production.

The album features 4 songs with lyrics by Yener who also composed 3 tracks, as well as lyrics and compositions by Genco Ecer, Berksan, Misha, and Tepki. Misha produced the entire album. Afrodizyak is an album featuring songs in pop, R&B, deep house, and funky house genres. Before its release, Yener stated in an interview that the album's title brought a sense of joy and instant enthusiasm to everyone who heard it. She explained that the album's "aphrodisiac" effect inspired her to name it Afrodizyak.

== Cover and promotion ==
All the photos on the album cover were taken in a black Range Rover. Some were taken inside the car, some outside of it. "HY" was written in a metallic font beneath the photos to represent Yener's name.

Yener gave a concert at the Kuruçeşme Open Air Stage at 9:00 PM the day before the album's release on 22 June 2023. She performed all the songs from the album, including her duet "Vazgeçtim" with her boyfriend Misha. Following the album's release, Yener gave concerts in Istanbul, İzmir, Cyprus, Bodrum and Bulgaria.

== Music videos ==
The first music video of the album was shot for the song "Benden Bir Tane Daha Yok". Murat Joker served as the director. The song was first released as a single well before the album's release date. The second music video of the album was shot for the song "Hop Hop". Tepki was the director and Yener was accompanied by her dancers in the video. The song managed to enter the music charts in Turkey. The third music video of the album was shot for the song "Çatla". Tepki was the director again. Yener was again accompanied by her dancers. The fourth and final music video was shot for the song "Yara". However, it was not released. All of the music videos were shot in Cyprus.

== Reception ==
Writing for Milliyet, Mayk Şişman believed that the album in its entirety could not surpass the success of its first promotional single "Benden Bir Tane Daha Yok" and Yener's adherence to a single formula had made the songs monotonous and eliminated the possibility of them becoming major hits.

== Track listing ==
No.	Title	Writer(s)	Length
1.	"Hop Hop"	Genco Ecer, Misha	2:54
2.	"Öp Beni"	Hande Yener, Misha	2:16
3.	"Yara"	Berksan, Hande Yener	3:44
4.	"Çatla"	Genco Ecer	2:29
5.	"Vazgeçtim" (ft. Misha)	Genco Ecer	2:59
6.	"Denge"	Hande Yener, Misha	2:32
7.	"Sus"	Genco Ecer	2:36
8.	"Havale"	Genco Ecer	2:29
9.	"Belki"	Hande Yener, Misha	2:25
10.	"Oluruna Bıraktım"	Genco Ecer	3:04
11.	"Yoksa"	Hande Yener	3:06
12.	"Değmez"	Tepki	2:36
13.	"Beni Öyle Sev"	Berksan, Misha	3:18
14.	"Hoşçakal"	Genco Ecer	3:49
15.	"Benden Bir Tane Daha Yok"	Genco Ecer	2:19
Total length:			42:44
