= Honey (2010 film) =

2010 film

- Film poster
- Directed by: Semih Kaplanoğlu
- Produced by: Semih Kaplanoğlu; Johannes Rexin; Bettina Brokemper
- Starring: Erdal Beşikçioğlu
- Cinematography: Barış Özbiçer
- Edited by: Ayhan Ergürsel; Suzan Hande Güneri; Semih Kaplanoğlu
- Production company: Kaplan Film Production
- Release dates: 11 February 2010 (Berlin); 9 April 2010 (Turkey)
- Running time: 100 minutes
- Countries: Turkey; Germany
- Language: Turkish

Honey (Turkish: Bal) is a 2010 Turkish drama film directed by Semih Kaplanoğlu, the third and final installment of the "Yusuf Trilogy", which includes Egg and Milk. It premiered on 16 February 2010 in competition at the 60th Berlin International Film Festival, where it became the third Turkish film, after Susuz Yaz in 1964 and Head-On in 2004, to win the Golden Bear award. The film, which went on general release across Turkey on 9 April 2010, was selected as Turkey's official candidate for the Best Foreign Film Oscar at the 83rd Academy Awards but it did not make the final shortlist.

== Plot ==
In the remote and undeveloped eastern Black Sea region, a six-year-old boy (Yusuf) wanders through the woods searching for his lost father, trying to make sense of his life. His father is a beekeeper whose bees have disappeared unexpectedly, threatening his livelihood. A bizarre accident kills the father. There is little dialogue or music in the film. The three main characters (Yusuf and his parents) are all fairly taciturn, and the soundtrack is filled out with the sounds of the forest and the creatures that live there. The environment is a recurring theme.

== Cast ==
- Erdal Beşikçioğlu as Yakup
- Tülin Özen as Zehra
- Alev Uçarer
- Bora Altaş as Yusuf
- Ayşe Altay

== Production ==
Honey is the last installment of Kaplanoğlu's autobiographical "Yusuf Trilogy", named after the central character, preceded by Egg (Yumurta, 2007) and Milk (Süt, 2008). Egg was screened at Cannes, Milk at Venice. The trilogy runs in reverse chronological order, and Honey explores Yusuf's early childhood.

The film was shot in Çamlıhemşin district in Rize Province in northeastern Turkey, and was jointly produced by Turkey's Kaplan Film Production and Germany's Heimatfilm, and shot in the mountains of Turkey. The scriptwriting was supported by a 25,000 Turkish lira grant (approx. €12,000 or $16,500) from Script Development Fund of the Antalya Eurasia Film Festival, while the production was supported by funding from the Council of Europe Eurimages fund, the North Rhine Westphalia Film Foundation and the television stations ZDF and Arte.

== Reception ==
=== Critical response ===
The film received positive reviews from critics. Honey has an approval rating of 85% on review aggregator website Rotten Tomatoes, based on 27 reviews, and an average rating of 6.8/10. Metacritic assigned the film a weighted average score of 70 out of 100, based on 5 critics, indicating "generally favorable reviews".

Katja Nicodemus (Die Zeit) praised the film as an "existential narrative about the world view of a child, about loss and mourning". She picks out the calm rhythm and the landscape photography: "In Bal, you believe you can smell the rain drizzling on the boy on his way to school". Detlef Kuhlbrodt (Die Tageszeitung) spoke of Kaplanoğlu's "meditative" film, while Christina Tilmann (Tagesspiegel) described it as "one of the most beautiful and most intimate films of this festival", made from unspectacular ingredients "... a film that lets the viewer dream. It feels like wind, like oxygen, air that you want to keep with you for as long as you can. Or like the Sun shining in the forest through marvelously tower-high trees."

=== Accolades ===
Honey beat 19 other films from around the world to win the Golden Bear award. Its win was seen as a "surprise" by some. Kaplanoğlu reacted by recalling an encounter with a bear while filming, "The bear is now back." At a press conference the director said: "In the name of Turkish Films, this is a very meaningful prize. It's a help to making better films". It was nominated for Best Film, Best Director and Best Cinematography at the 23rd European Film Awards.

== See also ==
- 2010 in film
- Cinema of Turkey
- Turkish films of 2010
- List of submissions to the 83rd Academy Awards for Best Foreign Language Film
- List of Turkish submissions for the Academy Award for Best Foreign Language Film
