= Egg (2007 film) =

- Film poster
- Turkish: Yumurta
- Directed by: Semih Kaplanoğlu
- Written by: Semih Kaplanoğlu; Orçun Köksal
- Produced by: Semih Kaplanoğlu; Lilette Botassi
- Starring: Nejat İşler; Saadet Aksoy; Ufuk Bayraktar; Tülin Özen; Gülçin Santırcıoğlu; Kaan Karabacak; Semra Kaplanoglu
- Release dates: May 22, 2007 (Cannes); November 9, 2007
- Running time: 97 minutes
- Country: Turkey
- Language: Turkish

Egg (Turkish: Yumurta) is a 2007 Turkish drama film directed by Semih Kaplanoğlu. The film is the first instalment of the Yusuf Trilogy, named after the eponymous lead character of the series, which includes Milk and Honey, filmed and released in reverse chronological order. It was shown Directors' Fortnight at the 60th Cannes Film Festival.

== Plot ==
Poet Yusuf learns about the death of his mother Zehra and goes back to his hometown, Tire, where he had not been for years. In his mother's house, a young girl, his cousin Ayla, awaits him. Yusuf had not been aware of Ayla, who had been living with his mother for five years.

Ayla conveys to Yusuf Zehra's pledge to sacrifice a lamb after her death and tells Yusuf that he has to carry out his mother's wishes. Gradually he succumbs to the memories in the house, and the rhythms of the town, its inhabitants, and the spaces filled with ghosts.

Yusuf and Ayla set off for a saint's tomb, a couple of hours away, for the religious sacrifice ceremony that his mother had pledged. Arriving after the herd from which they had planned to purchase a lamb has gone into the mountains to graze, they are forced to spend the night in a hotel by a nearby crater lake. A wedding ceremony held at the hotel brings Yusuf and Ayla closer.

== Cast ==
- Nejat İşler as Yusuf
- Saadet Aksoy as Ayla
- Ufuk Bayraktar as Haluk
- Tülin Özen as woman in the bookstore
- Gülçin Santırcıoğlu as Gül
- Kaan Karabacak as peasant child
- Semra Kaplanoglu as Zehra

== Awards ==
- 2007 Valdivia International Film Festival - Best Director, Best Actress
- 2007 Sarajevo Film Festival - Best Actress, Heart of Sarajevo: Best Actress
- 2007 Antalya Golden Orange Film Festival - Best Picture, Best Screenplay, Best Camera Direction, Best Art Direction, Best Costume Design, Behlül Dal Digitürk Jury Special Award for Young Talent, NETPAC Jury Award for Best Picture
- 2007 World Film Festival of Bangkok - Best Director (Harvest of Talents competition)
- 2008 Istanbul International Film Festival - Golden Tulip, Radikal People's Choice Award
- 2008 Fajr International Film Festival - Best Director
