= Away from Home (film) =

2001 film by Semih Kapanoglu

- Screenshot of Herkes Kendi Evinde
- Directed by: Semih Kaplanoğlu
- Written by: Özden Cankaya; Semih Kaplanoğlu; Serpil Kırel
- Produced by: Ali Bilgen; Levent Onan; Semih Kaplanoğlu; Leyla Özalp
- Starring: Tolga Çevik; Erol Keskin; Anna Bielska
- Cinematography: Hayk Kirakosyan
- Edited by: Hakan Akol, Onur Tan
- Music by: Selim Atakan
- Release date: 4 May 2001
- Running time: 110 minutes
- Country: Turkey
- Language: Turkish

Away from Home (Turkish:Herkes Kendi Evinde) is a 2001 Turkish drama film directed by Semih Kaplanoğlu. The film won 6 awards including at the Ankara International Film Festival and Istanbul International Film Festival.

== Cast ==
- Tolga Çevik as Selim
- Erol Keskin as Nasuhi
- Anna Bielska as Olga
- Yalçın Akçay
- Şükran Güngör
- Devrim Parscan
- Cüneyt Türel
