= Mert Fırat =

Turkish actor and screenwriter

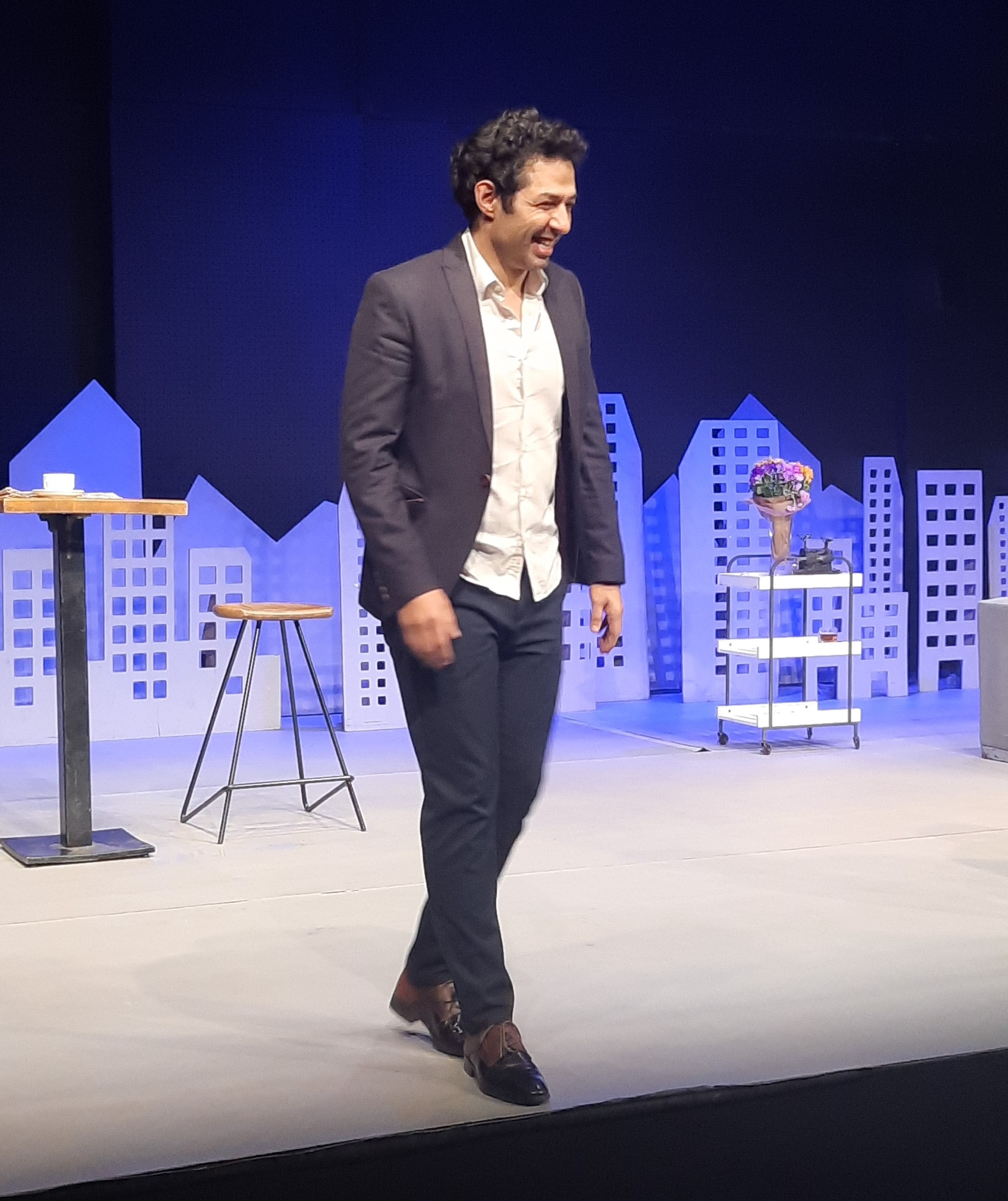
- Born: Şahabettin Mert Fırat; 10 January 1981 (age 45); Ankara, Turkey
- Occupation: Actor
- Years active: 2005–present
- Spouse: İdil Fırat (m. 2018)
- Children: 1

Şahabettin Mert Fırat (born 10 January 1981) is a Turkish actor and screenwriter. He is of Arab descent.

== Life ==
His father is singer Nihat Fırat. After finishing high school, he studied radio and television broadcasting in Sweden. He then returned to Ankara and took acting classes in Ankara University. Fırat graduated from the theatre department of Ankara University and took his master's degree in Film and Drama from Kadir Has University. He founded the "Moda Theatre" and "Das Das" in Istanbul, and "Sanat Mahal" in Bursa. He has appeared in more than fifteen films since 2005 and has won many awards. In October 2017 the United Nations Development Programme (UNDP) Turkey chose Fırat as a Goodwill Ambassador in Turkey.

== Filmography ==
=== Screenwriter ===
- Başka Dilde Aşk (2009)
- Atlıkarınca (2010)
- Bir Varmış Bir Yokmuş (2015)

=== Actor ===
Streaming series
Title	Year	Role	Note
İlginç Bazı Olaylar	2021	Tolgay	
Aşk 101	2021	Adult Kerem	
TV series
Title	Year	Role	Note
Bizim Evin Halleri	2000	Bora	
Binbir Gece	2006–2008	Burak İnceoğlu	
Yersiz Yurtsuz	2007	Hüseyin	
Kapalıçarşı	2009–2010	Arda Güler	
Bir Ömür Yetmez	2011	Ali Akyol	
İntikam	2013–2014	Emre Arsoy	
Serçe Sarayı	2015	Kadir	
Aşk ve Gurur	2017	Kenan	
Ufak Tefek Cinayetler	2017–2018	Serhan Aksak	
Kefaret	2020–2021	Sinan	
Bir Derdim Var	2023	Ömer Atakan	
Films
Title	Year	Role	Note
İşte Benim	2006	Ali	
Hayattan Korkma	2007	Engin	
Başka Dilde Aşk	2009	Onur	
Atlıkarınca	2010	Erdem	
Beni Unutma	2011	Sinan	
Dedemin İnsanları	2011	Hasan	
Devrimden Sonra	2011	Köylü Genç	
Unutma Beni İstanbul	2011		
Kelebeğin Rüyası	2013	Rüştü Onur	
Erkek Tarafı Testosteron	2013	Tankut	
The Water Diviner	2014	Ordu Görevlisi	
Gece	2014	Yusuf	
Bir Varmış Bir Yokmu	2015	Ozan	
Yol Ayrımı	2017		
Her Şey Seninle Güzel	2018		
Arif V 216	2018	Sadri Alışık	
Bembeyaz	2021	Vural Beyaz	
Karanlık Şehir Hikayeleri: Kilit	2021		

== Theatre ==
- Hastalık Hastası (1999–2000, Söder Theatre, İsveç)
- Suç ve Ceza (2001–2004 Ankara Devlet Tiyatrosu)
- Şeyh Bedrettin (2002–2003, Ankara Devlet Tiyatrosu)
- Palyaço Prens (2003–2004, Ankara Devlet Tiyatrosu)
- Atları da Vururlar (2004–2005, Ankara Devlet Tiyatrosu)
- Hırçın Kız (2006–2007, Oyun Atölyesi) – Tranio
- Testosteron (2008–2012, Oyun Atölyesi) – Tretyn
- Antonius ile Kleopatra (2012, Oyun Atölyesi) – Caesar
- Bütün Çılgınlar Sever Beni (2013–) – Janus
- Parkta Güzel Bir Gün (2014–) – Sınır Muhafızı
- En Kısa Gecenin Rüyası (2015–) – Dimitrius
- Joseph k (DasDas, İstanbul)
- Westend / Batının Sonu (DasDas, İstanbul)
- deli bayrami (DasDas, İstanbul)

== Commercial ==
- İş Bankası Maximum Kart
