= Snow (2015 film) =

2015 Bulgarian film

- Directed by: Ventsislav Vasilev
- Release date: October 9, 2015 (Golden Rose Bulgarian Feature Film Festival)
- Country: Bulgaria
- Language: Bulgarian

Snow (Bulgarian: "Сняг", romanized: Snyag, Ukrainian: «Сніг», romanized: Snih) is a 2015 Bulgarian film, a co-production with Ukraine, directed by Ventsislav Vasilev.

The film premiered at the XXXIII edition of the Golden Rose Bulgarian Feature Film Festival in Varna on 9 October 2015. The film participated at the XXXI Warsaw International Film Festival, which took place in October 2015, and at the XXV festival for Eastern European cinema in Cottbus, Germany in November 2015. During the XIV festival for European cinema Cinedays in Skopje in 2015 it won the "Golden Sun" award for the best Balkan film. It participated at the XX Sofia International Film Fest in March 2016.

== Cast ==
- Plamen Velikov
- Ovanes Torosyan
- Krasimir Dokov
- Vladimir Yamnenko
- Ivana Papazova
- Bozhidar Popchev
- Biser Marinov
- Konstantin Asenov
