= Pano Zodeia =

Pano Zodeia: Πάνω Ζώδεια (Greek); Yukarı Bostancı (Turkish)
- Location within Cyprus
- Coordinates: 35°09′49″N 33°00′57″E
- Country (de jure): Cyprus
  - District: Nicosia District
- Country (de facto): Northern Cyprus
  - District: Güzelyurt District
- Time zone: UTC+2 (EET)
  - Summer (DST): UTC+3 (EEST)

Pano Zodeia (Greek: (η) Πάνω Ζώδεια; Turkish: Yukarı Bostancı) is a village on the island of Cyprus, east of Morphou. De facto, it is under the control of Northern Cyprus.

== Green Line crossing ==
Pano Zodeia is the location of one of six Green Line crossings between the Republic of Cyprus and Northern Cyprus. The town on the Republic side of the border is Astromeritis. The crossing is only for vehicular traffic. It was opened on 31 August 2005.
