= Ovanes Torosyan =

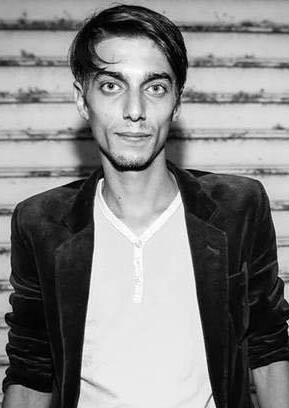
- Born: December 7, 1986; Yerevan, Armenia
- Occupations: Actor, Theater director, Playwright
- Years active: 2008-present

Ovanes Torosyan (Armenian: Հովհաննես Թորոսյան; Bulgarian: Ованес Торосян; born 7 December 1986) is a Bulgarian film and stage actor, theater director and playwright of Armenian origin.

== Career ==
In 1993, because of the military conflict in Nagorno-Karabakh, his family settled in Sofia, Bulgaria. He went to 76 school "William Saroyan" in Sofia. He graduated in acting from National Academy for Theater and Film Arts, Sofia in 2009 in the class of Prof. Plamen Markov and Ivaylo Hristov. In 2016 he graduated theater directing at National Academy for Theatre and Film Arts.

Ovanes Torosyan is a co-founder of Theater "Replica" in Sofia. He is acting on stage with Ivan Vazov National Theatre in Sofia, Drama theater "Stefan Kirov" in Sliven, Satirical Theater "Aleko Konstantinov", Modern Theatre, Theatre Workshop "Sfumato", Red House, Youth Theatre "Nikolay Binev" and theater "Azaryan".

Ovanes Torosian deals with documentary, improvisational theater and directing.

== Filmography ==
Film
Year	Title	Role	Notes
2008	Anything for You		
2009	Eastern Plays	Georgi	
2011	Tilt	Gogo	
2011	Avé	Kamen	
2012	Krapetz		
2012	I Am You	Boyan	
2013	Otchuzhdenie		
2014	The Judgment	Vasko	
2014	Lighthouse Woman		Short
2014	Improvise This		TV movie
2015	Getting Fat in a Healthy Way	Constantine	Short
2015	Adultery	Viktor	
2015	Losers	Viktor	
2015	Banat (Il Viaggio)	Christian	
2015	Forgiveness	Sasho	Short
2015	Snow	Marti	
2015	The Prosecutor the Defender the Father and His Son	Deyan - Miro	
2016	Adam	Adam / Guard	Short

== Awards ==
- In 2010 he was nominated for "Icar" in the "debut" in the role of Michael in "Puheniyat" ("The Pillowman").
- "Golden Rose" (2010) for Best Supporting Actor in "Eastern Plays" and "Tilt"
- Award of the Union of Bulgarian Film Makers (2010) for Best Supporting Actor in "Tilt"
- Award of the Union of Bulgarian Film Makers (2011) for Best Actor in "Ave"
- Tashkend IFF (2012) - Golden Guepard for Best Actor in "Ave"
