= Hepsi Hit Vol. 2 =

Studio album by Hande Yener
- Released: 21 June 2017
- Genre: Pop
- Length: 53:23
- Label: Poll
- Producer: Polat Yağcı

Hande Yener chronology
Hepsi Hit Vol. 1 (2016)	Hepsi Hit Vol. 2 (2017)	Carpe Diem (2020)

Singles from Hepsi Hit Vol. 2
- 1. "Bakıcaz Artık" Released: 23 May 2017

Hepsi Hit Vol. 2 (All Hits Vol. 2) is the thirteenth studio album by Turkish singer Hande Yener. It was released on 21 June 2017 by Poll Production.

== Music and lyrics ==
The fifth song in the album, "Vay", was found similar to Bendeniz's "Güzeller Güzeli" (Zaman, 2001). The album's ninth song, "Faili Meçhul", was compared by some critics to Daft Punk's "The Game of Love".

== Critical reception ==
Hürriyet's Naim Dilmener praised the songs written by Mete Özgencil, but believed that the ones written and composed by Mert Ekren were not suitable for Yener, and added that Ekren had tried to use Altan Çetin's formula for Yener's previous albums in writing and composing the new pieces. Dilmener wrote that Hande Yener was a successful artist with the ability to release hit songs, but added that this album would not become a hit, just like its predecessor Hepsi Hit Vol. 1. He mentioned that Yener "should choose the names she will work with more carefully, and find a way to resist the constraints of the label owners." Habertürk's Oben Burak praised Özgencil for his work on this album and added that it was "so full of good songs."

In his review for Hayat Müzik, Yavuz Hakan Tok wrote: "[In this album] Hande Yener could neither do what we wanted to see her do, nor was she was able to turn herself into what she thought she could become." He liked a part of the album, about which he said: "... in any case, if it was required to necessarily listen to Hande Yener, we could handle it with the likes of 'Ben En Çok', 'Leyla', 'Sana Bir Şey Olmaz', 'Faili Meçhul'. After that? Well, the next step is clear. This is Hande Yener, you know it: Everything changes in five minutes!" Tok also outlined many criticisms that were focused on the album's promotion and emphasized that choosing the name 'Hepsi Hit' for the album was not a good decision, describing the promotional campaign as "A sheer aggressive campaign focused on marketing their own products as 'good' by describing those of others as 'rotten'; a 'dirty' campaign, so to speak."

== Music videos ==
Three of the songs from Hepsi Hit Vol. 2 were turned into music videos. All three music videos were directed by Michael Garcia. The first music video, "Bakıcaz Artık", was recorded in Beverly Hills, Malibu and Hollywood, and released in May 2017. It was nominated for the Best Music Video award at the 44th Golden Butterfly Awards. The song itself was nominated for the Song of the Year award and ranked second on Turkey's official music chart. The second music video, "Benden Sonra", was recorded at the Ali AltaModa store in Şişli, where Yener used to work as a clerk in the 1990s before becoming famous. The music video was released in August. The album's third and final music video was made and released for the song "Vay".

== Track listing ==
No.	Title	Writer(s)	Length
1.	"Alev Alev"	Mert Ekren	3:46
2.	"Bakıcaz"	Mert Ekren	3:42
3.	"Patates"	Mert Ekren	3:01
4.	"Sana Bir Şey Olmaz"	Zeki Güner	4:08
5.	"Vay"	Mert Ekren	3:13
6.	"Benden Sonra"	Mert Ekren	3:24
7.	"Ben En Çok"	Mete Özgencil	4:37
8.	"Leyla"	Mete Özgencil	4:45
9.	"Faili Meçhul"	Mert Ekren	3:08
10.	"Şükür"	Mert Ekren	3:15
11.	"Misafir"	Mert Ekren	3:47
12.	"Alev Alev" (feat. Mert Erken)	Mert Ekren	3:45
13.	"Bakıcaz" (Çağın Kulaçoğlu & Levent Lodos Remix)	Mert Ekren	4:34
14.	"Sana Bir Şey Olmaz" (Çağın Kulaçoğlu & Nurettin Çolak Remix)	Zeki Güner	4:07
Total length:			53:23

== Charts ==
Chart (2017)	Peak position
Turkey (D&R Best-Selling)	4

== Release history ==
Country	Date	Format(s)	Label	Ref.
Turkey	21 June 2017	CD · digital download	Poll Production	
Worldwide	21 June 2017	Dijital indirme	Poll Production	
