= Leyla İpekçi =

Turkish journalist (born 1966)

- Born: 13 October 1966 (age 59); Istanbul, Turkey
- Education: Boğaziçi University; Sociology
- Occupations: Journalist, writer, columnist
- Spouse: Semih Kaplanoğlu

Leyla İpekçi (born 13 October 1966) is a Turkish journalist, screenwriter, and columnist.

== Life ==
Leyla İpekçi, the niece of Abdi İpekçi, graduated from Saint Michel French High School and completed her studies in Sociology at Boğaziçi University. In June 1999, she married director Semih Kaplanoğlu.

=== Writing career ===
She worked as an author for Yeni Yüzyıl in 1995 and Hürriyet in 1996. She has also published articles in Gazetepazar, where she was in charge of the edition management. She wrote for Radikal newspaper until the beginning of 2006, and wrote columns for Zaman newspaper for 2.5 years. Later, in June 2008, she transferred to Taraf newspaper. İpekçi, who wrote the column "Saatler" for Taraf for three years, started publishing her articles in Zaman newspaper in July 2011 where she worked until 2013.

=== Gülen movement ties ===
Leyla İpekçi wrote for both Zaman and Taraf, the two major newspapers affiliated with the Gülen movement. These periodicals facilitated the movement's outreach to a broader public as they gained power in Turkey. The Turkish government closed down both newspapers after the 2016 Turkish coup d'état attempt, for which they held the Gülen movement responsible. İpekçi also participated in the events organized by the Journalists and Writers Foundation [Gazeteciler ve Yazarlar Vakfı] where Gülen serves as the honorary President.

Oray Eğin, columnist of Akşam newspaper, stated in his article dated 26 June 2008, that "she had been educated in the United States by a scholarship with the help of Gülen," to which Leyla İpekçi responded by saying: "I have not stepped in America in my life. I find this kind of news quite ugly." and announced that she would seek her legal rights against this article. For her article "The biggest obstacle in front of the new CHP", published in Taraf on 3 April 2009, a complaint was filed against her, which was found groundless by the Press Council.

== Awards ==
- 1998: Winner of Milliyet Art Magazine's "First Book First Edition" competition with her book "Maya"
- 2007: Turkish Authors' Association "Author of the Year" award
- 2011: 'Best Book of the Year' award from Association of Literary Arts and Cultural Studies (ESKADER) for the book 'Gecenin İkinci Rüyası'

== Works ==
- Maya
- Sinan'ın Mayası
- İlk Kötülük
- Ateş ve Bahçe
- Başkası Olduğun Yer
- Şölen Sofrası / Kadın-Erkek İlişkilerine and Benliğe Dair Denemeler
- Bir Sevgili Gibi Yaşamak / Savaş, Kimlik and Vicdana Dair
- Gecenin İkinci Rüyası
- 5 Vakit İstanbul (written together with Ümit Meriç, Sadettin Ökten, Senai Demirci and Hüseyin Hatemi)
- Şehrim Aşk
