= Commitment Hasan =

2021 film

- Release poster
- Directed by: Semih Kaplanoğlu
- Starring: Umut Karadag
- Release date: 11 July 2021 (Cannes)
- Country: Turkey
- Language: Turkish

Commitment Hasan (Turkish: Bağlılık Hasan) is a 2021 Turkish drama film directed by Semih Kaplanoğlu. In June 2021, the film was selected to compete in the Un Certain Regard section at the 2021 Cannes Film Festival. It was selected as the Turkish entry for the Best International Feature Film at the 94th Academy Awards.

== Plot ==
A farmer reflects on his past as he prepares to make his pilgrimage to Mecca.

== Cast ==
- Umut Karadag as Hasan
- Filiz Bozok as Emine
- Gökhan Azlag as Serdar
- Ayse Gunyuz Demirci as Nisa
- Mahir Günsiray as Muzaffer
- Hakan Altiner as Hakim Mehmet

== Release ==
The film had its release on 11 July 2021 at the 2021 Cannes Film Festival, where it also competed in the Un Certain Regard section. It is also selected to compete in ICFT UNESCO Gandhi Medal at the 52nd International Film Festival of India, where it will be screened in November 2021.

== See also ==
- List of submissions to the 94th Academy Awards for Best International Feature Film
- List of Turkish submissions for the Academy Award for Best International Feature Film
