= The Judgment (2014 film) =

2014 film by Stephan Komandarev

- Bulgarian theatrical release poster
- Directed by: Stephan Komandarev
- Written by: Marin Damyanov; Emil Spahiyski; Stephan Komandarev
- Produced by: Stephan Komandarev; Katya Trichkova; Polly Guentcheva; Alexander Ris; Christine Haupt; Boris T. Matic; Vladimir Anastasov; Angela Nestorovska
- Starring: Assen Blatechki
- Cinematography: Krasimir Andonov
- Edited by: Nina Altaparmakova
- Music by: Stefan Valdobrov
- Release dates: 6 March 2014 (SIFF); 16 October 2014 (Bulgaria)
- Running time: 107 minutes
- Countries: Bulgaria; Germany; Croatia
- Language: Bulgarian

The Judgment (Bulgarian: Съдилището) is a 2014 drama film directed by Stephan Komandarev. It was selected as the Bulgarian entry for the Best Foreign Language Film at the 88th Academy Awards but it was not nominated.

== Plot ==
The film takes place in Bulgaria by the Rhodope Mountains, near the Turkish border. A widower, Mityo, needs money to forestall foreclosure on his home. He drives a milk tanker but business is slow, so he reluctantly accepts a job smuggling migrants over the border into Bulgaria. (A character in the film describes the migrants as "Gypsies, Arabs, and blacks"; many of them are presumably Refugees of the Syrian Civil War.) The work reminds Mityo of his military service in the late 1980s, assigned to the Bulgarian border guard, where his task was to prevent citizens from leaving the Eastern Bloc.

== Cast ==
- Assen Blatechki as Mitio
- Ovanes Torosian as Vasko
- Ina Nikolova as Maria
- Predrag Manojlovic as The Captain
- Paraskeva Djukelova as Kera
- Meto Jovanovski as The Doctor
- Vasil Vasilev-Zueka as Ramadan

== Awards and submissions ==
The film was selected as the Bulgarian entry for the Best Foreign Language Film at the 88th Academy Awards, although it did not receive a nomination.

== See also ==
- List of submissions to the 88th Academy Awards for Best Foreign Language Film
- List of Bulgarian submissions for the Academy Award for Best Foreign Language Film
