= Face Down (film) =

- French release poster
- Directed by: Kamen Kalev
- Written by: Emmanuel Courcol; Kamen Kalev
- Produced by: John Engel; Kamen Kalev; Elitza Katzarska; Jean Labadie
- Starring: Melvil Poupaud; Seher Nebieva
- Cinematography: Julian Atanassov
- Edited by: Xavier Sirven
- Music by: Raf Keunen
- Production companies: Le Pacte; Waterfront Film; Left Field Ventures
- Distributed by: Le Pacte (France)
- Release date: 14 October 2015 (France)
- Running time: 104 minutes
- Countries: France; Belgium; Bulgaria
- Languages: French; Bulgarian

Face Down (French title: Tête baissée) is a 2015 drama film directed by Kamen Kalev and starring Melvil Poupaud and Seher Nebieva. It received the Best Director Award at the Golden Rose Film Festival.

== Cast ==
- Melvil Poupaud as Samy
- Seher Nebieva as Elka
- Lidia Koleva as Snejana
- Sunai Siuleiman as Uhoto
- Aylin Yay as Yanne
- Atanas Asenov as Canko
- Youssef Hajdi as Driss
- Hocine Choutri as Kader
- Johan Carlsson as Brian
- Nadejda Ilieva as Lidiya
