= The Island (2011 film) =

- Bulgarian: Островът
- Directed by: Kamen Kalev
- Written by: Kamen Kalev
- Produced by: Anguel Christanov; Kamen Kalev; Elitza Katzarska; Stela Pavlova; Filip Todorov; Emre Yeksan; Fredrik Zander
- Starring: Thure Lindhardt Laetitia Casta
- Cinematography: Julian Atanassov
- Music by: Jean-Paul Wall
- Release dates: 16 May 2011 (Cannes); 10 October 2011 (Bulgaria)
- Running time: 95 minutes
- Countries: Bulgaria; Sweden
- Languages: Bulgarian, English, French
- Budget: € 1,500,000 (estimated)

The Island (Bulgarian: Островът, romanized: Ostrovăt) is the second film from Bulgarian director Kamen Kalev. It is a Bulgarian-Swedish production about a young Parisian couple vacationing on a small island, off the Bulgarian Black Sea coast. The film premiered on 16 May 2011, at the Directors’ Fortnight in Cannes 2011.

== Synopsis ==
Sophie and Daneel, both in their early thirties, are a close and passionate couple living in Paris. Sophie initiates a surprise journey to Bulgaria. Daneel explicitly refuses to go, but Sophie insists and convinces him to leave. When they arrive, Sophie discovers that Daneel was born there.

After a few hours on the crowded beaches, Daneel leads Sophie to an abandoned island lost in the Black Sea. Once there, Daneel discovers pregnancy tests in Sophie's luggage. The heat and the strange few inhabitants soon alter their behaviors, and the island slowly reveals hidden fears that question their love. To get through it all, they have to jump into the unknown.

== Cast ==
- Thure Lindhardt — Daneel
- Laetitia Casta — Sophie
- Bertille Chabert — Lou
- Rousy Chanev — Pavel
- Olivier Claverie — Simon
- Luben Dilov Son — actor
- Alexander Elenkov — Bellboy
- Alejandro Jodorowsky — Jodo
- Elli Medeiros — Jeanette
- Mihail Mutafov — Ilia
- Valia — actress
- Boyka Velkova — Irina
- Ivan and Andrey — actors

== Awards and nominations ==
Festival participation / Award	Date of ceremony	Category	Recipients and nominees	Result
43rd Directors' Fortnight, Cannes	16 May 2011	Feature films	Kamen Kalev	Nominated
17th Sarajevo Film Festival	24 July 2011	In Focus selection	Kamen Kalev	Nominated
44th Sitges Film Festival	10 October 2011	Noves Visions - Ficció	Kamen Kalev	Nominated
27th Haifa International Film Festival	14 October 2011	Cinematheque	Kamen Kalev	Nominated
30th Golden Rose film festival, Varna	18 October 2011	Best Cinematographer	Julian Atanassov	Won
40th Festival International de Films de Montréal	19 October 2011	International Selection	Kamen Kalev	Nominated
33rd Montpellier Film Festival	23 October 2011	Features - competition	Kamen Kalev	Nominated
52nd Thessaloniki International Film Festival	7 November 2011	Balkan Survey	Kamen Kalev	Nominated
42nd International Film Festival of India, Goa	28 November 2011	Cinema of the world	Kamen Kalev	Nominated
