= Commitment (2019 film) =

2019 film

- Film poster
- Directed by: Semih Kaplanoğlu
- Starring: Kübra Kip
- Release date: 20 September 2019
- Running time: 135 minutes
- Country: Turkey
- Language: Turkish

Commitment (Turkish: Bağlılık Aslı) is a 2019 Turkish drama film directed by Semih Kaplanoğlu. It was selected as the Turkish entry for the Best International Feature Film at the 92nd Academy Awards, but it was not nominated.

== Plot ==
New mother Aslı hires a babysitter named Gülnihal, who also has a baby of her own. Aslı soon confronts her own long-held secrets.

== Cast ==
- Kubra Kip as Aslı
- Umut Kurt as Faruk
- Ece Yüksel as Gülnihal

== See also ==
- List of submissions to the 92nd Academy Awards for Best International Feature Film
- List of Turkish submissions for the Academy Award for Best International Feature Film
