= Emre Karayel =

Turkish actor (born 1972)

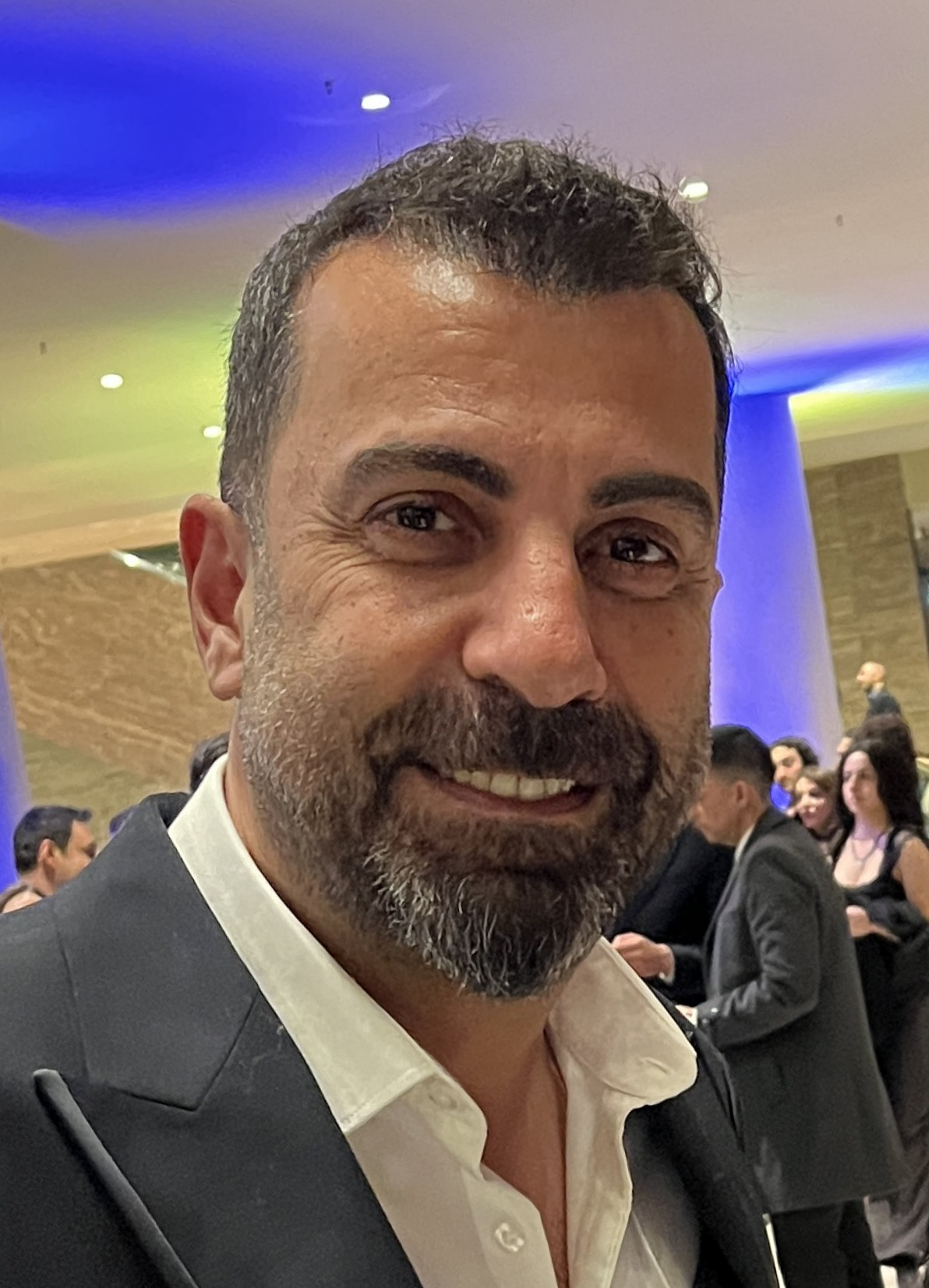
- Born: 18 October 1972 (age 53); Kadirli, Turkey
- Education: Ankara Atatürk Anatolian High School; Gazi University (left); Bilkent University
- Occupations: Actor; TV presenter
- Years active: 2000–present
- Spouse: Gizem Demirci (m. 2020)
- Children: 1

Emre Karayel (born 18 October 1972) is a Turkish actor and TV presenter. He is best known for the rom-com 1 Kadın 1 Erkek, in which he starred for 8 seasons.

== Life and career ==
Emre Karayel was born on 18 October 1972 in Kadirli, a district of Osmaniye. After completing high school at Ankara Atatürk Anatolian High School, he entered Gazi University, School of Economics and Administrative Sciences, Department of Economics. Without completing his studies there, he transferred to Bilkent University, School of Music and Performing Arts, Theatre Department. After graduating from university in 1999, Karayel started working at TRT, hosted and prepared children's programs.

Karayel, who stepped into his professional acting career in 2000 with the TV series Ablam Böyle İstedi, which was broadcast on TRT, continued his career by appearing in the series Kuzenlerim in 2002, and later portrayed the character of "Zekeriya" the 2003 TV series Bir İstanbul Masalı, which brought him fame. He starred in many TV series such as Gümüş, Kurtlar Vadisi Pusu, and Canım Ailem.

Karayel made his cinematic debut with Police, which was directed by Onur Ünlü and released in 2006. It was followed by Zincirbozan in 2007, Usta in 2008 and Başka Dilde Aşk in 2009. In the same year, he acted in the short film Ezber, directed by Tolga Öztor to emphasize the violence against stray animals.

Besides his appearances in cinema and on television, Karayel has taken part in plays as Testosterone, Othello, Ghetto, and Azizname. He was awarded the Most Successful Musical or Comedy Actor of the Year in a Supporting Role at the 13th Afife Theatre Awards for his performance in the play Testosterone staged by Oyun Atölyesi.

Since 2008, Karayel shared the leading role as Ozan with Demet Evgar in the comedy series 1 Kadın 1 Erkek, Star TV's 1 Erkek 1 Kadın and Fox's 1 Erkek 1 Kadın 2 Çocuk series, which came to an end in 2015. In 2017, he began presenting the game show Sıradaki Gelsin on Fox, followed by Çarkıfelek on Kanal D between 2018 and 2020.

Karayel has also been a principal member of the Jockey Club of Turkey since 2020 and has race horses. One of them, Yiğit Kardeş, came first in the race on behalf of the 10th Ottoman sultan Suleiman the Magnificent at the Veliefendi Race Course on 16 October 2022. The thoroughbred Arabian horse named "Yiğit Kardeş" earned him ₺1.7 million.

He was cast in the series Son Yaz.

== Theatre ==
Year	Title	Role	Writer	Director	Venue
2000	Ghetto		Joshua Sobol	Erhan Gökgücü	Ankara State Theatre
2001	Azizname		Aziz Nesin	Yücel Erten	Öteki Theatre
2004	Othello	Othello	William Shakespeare	Kemal Aydoğan	Oyun Atölyesi
2005	The Other Death of Joan of Arc	Executioner	Stefan Tsanev	Kemal Aydoğan	Oyun Atölyesi
2008	Testosterone	Fistach	Andrzej Saramonowicz	Kemal Aydoğan	Oyun Atölyesi
2012	Antony and Cleopatra	Pompeius	William Shakespeare	Kemal Aydoğan	Oyun Atölyesi
2016	El crèdit		Jordi Galceran	İskender Altın	Ankara Art Theatre; Aysa Production Theatre
2018	Erkek Aklı Oksimoron	Semih	Robert Dubac	Erdal Beşikçioğlu	Tiyatro Yeniden

== Filmography ==
=== Television ===
Year	Title	Role	Notes
2000	Saksıdaki Ağaç	Şenol	
2002	Bizim Evin Halleri		
2002–2004	Kuzenlerim	Metin	
2003	Fişgittin Bey		TV film
2003	Ablam Böyle İstedi	Murat	
2003–2005	Bir İstanbul Masalı	Zekeriya	
2004–2005	Sayın Bakanım	Memduh	
2005	Kırık Kalpler Durağı	Hakan	
2005	Körfez Ateşi		
2005–2006	Gümüş	Engin	Episodes 1–63
2006	Acemi Cadı	Ayşegül's father	
2007	Tutsak	Serhat	
2007	Kurtlar Vadisi Pusu	Zafer Sasonlu	Episodes 1–22
2007–2008	Mahşer-Nabucco'nun Zehri	Gökhan	
2008	Paramparça Aşklar	Orhan	
2008–2009	Canım Ailem	Ferdi	Season 1
2008–2011	1 Kadın 1 Erkek	Ozan Karaman	
2012–2013	1 Erkek 1 Kadın	Ozan Karaman	
2014–2015	1 Erkek 1 Kadın 2 Çocuk	Ozan Karaman	
2016	Arkadaşlar İyidir	Tarık Hoca	
2018	Kocaman Ailem	Şinasi Koyuncular	
2021	Son Yaz	Fatih Doğanay	Season 1
2021	Eşkıya Dünyaya Hükümdar Olmaz		
2023–2024	Kardeşlerim	Yaman Soydan	
2024	Kirli Sepeti	Yiğit Karabey	
2024–2025	Bahar	Tolga	

=== Film ===
Year	Title	Role	Notes
2006	Polis	Bekir	
2007	Zincirbozan	Richard Perle	
2008	Usta	Niyazi	
2009	Başka Dilde Aşk	Aras	
2009	Ezber		Short film
2009	Aşkın İkinci Yarısı	Armen	
2012	Ölümden Kalma	Onur	
2013	Erkek Tarafı Testosteron	Kamber	
2015	Robinson Crusoe & Cuma	Robinson'un babası	
2016	El Değmemiş Aşk	Zafer	
2018	Düğüm Salonu	Tarık	
2019	Söz Vermiştin	Nesim	
2022	Uçuş 811	Özkan	
2024	Bir Cumhuriyet Şarkısı	Nuri Conker	

=== Web ===
Year	Title	Role	Notes
2021	Saklı	Murat	Series, guest appearance
2023	Sarmaşık Zamanı	Metin	Series
2024	Ru	Emir	Series

=== TV programs ===
- 2008 - 19th International Ankara Film Festival (with Dolunay Soysert)
- 2011 - Bul Bakalım
- 2014 - Akıl Kârı
- 2015 - Sesi Çok Güzel
- 2017 - Sıradaki Gelsin
- 2018 - 25th International Adana Film Festival (with Burcu Esmersoy)
- 2018–2020 - Çarkıfelek

== Awards ==
- 2009 - 13th Afife Theatre Awards - Most Successful Musical or Comedy Actor of the Year in a Supporting Role - Testosterone
