= Semih Kaplanoğlu =

Turkish film director

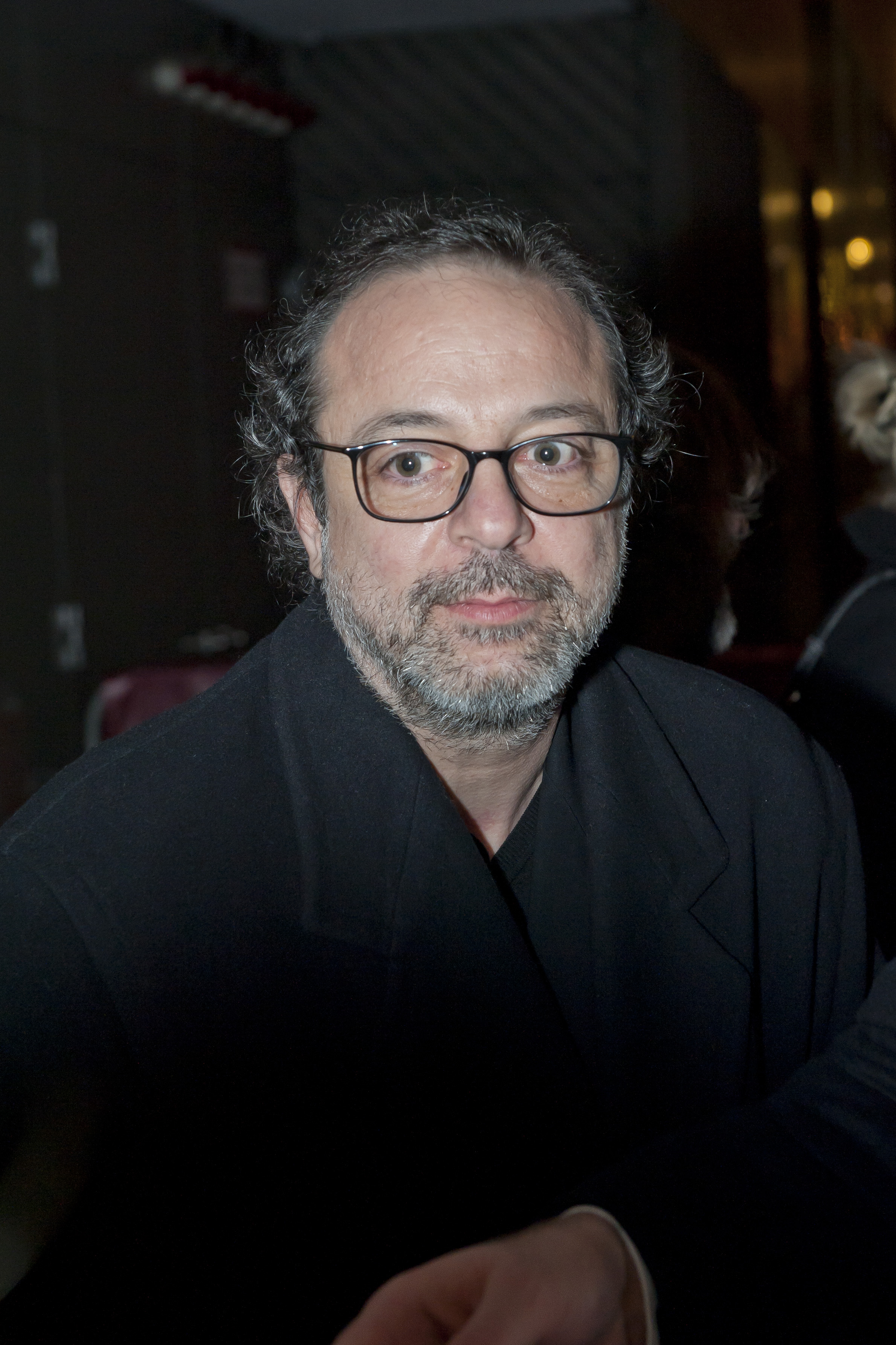
- Kaplanoğlu at the 60th Berlin International Film Festival 2010
- Born: 4 April 1963 (age 63); İzmir, Turkey
- Education: Cinema and television
- Alma mater: Dokuz Eylül University
- Occupations: Screenwriter, film director, film producer, columnist
- Spouse: Leyla İpekçi
- Writing career
- Notable awards: Antalya Golden Orange Award for Best SCreenplay, Bangkok World Film Prize for Best Director, Valdivia International Film Prize for Best Director, Singapore Silver Screen Award for Best Director

Semih Kaplanoğlu (born 4 April 1963) is a Turkish screenwriter, film director and producer.

== Life and career ==
In 1984, Kaplanoğlu moved to Istanbul and worked for a couple of years as a copywriter for advertising companies like Güzel Sanatlar Saatchi & Saatchi and Young & Rubicam.

He switched over to cinema in 1986 to become an assistant cameraman for two award-winning documentary films. In 1994 Kaplanoğlu wrote the script and directed a television series Şehnaz Tango with 52 episodes which was aired on TV channels Show TV and InterStar and became successful.

Kaplanoğlu's debut feature Away From Home was awarded Best Director in Singapore IFF in 2001. His second feature Angel's Fall premiered in 2005 Berlinale Forum and received Best Film Award at Nantes, Kerala and Barcelona Alternativa film festivals.

Between 2005 and 2010 he produced and directed the Yusuf Trilogy. Yumurta (Egg), the first film in the trilogy premiered in Cannes and won Best Director awards in Fajr, Valdivia and Bangkok film festivals. The trilogy’s second film Süt (Milk) premiered in Venice IFF. Bal (Honey), the third part won the Golden Bear Award in 60th Berlinale IFF. His latest film Buğday (Grain) is currently in post-production.

His films are characterized by metaphysical themes and distinctively authored use of cinematography.

Kaplanoglu, who is widely regarded as one of the most accomplished and influential directors in Turkish cinema, has received 28 international awards and 10 nominations worldwide.

He was a jury member in 2013 Cannes Film Festival Cinefondation and Short Films. He also is member of the European Film Academy as well as Asia Pacific Screen Academy.

Besides his main pursuits in cinema, Semih Kaplanoğlu wrote articles between 1987 and 2003 on plastic arts and cinema which were published on arts periodicals and translated into foreign languages. In the years from 1996 through 2000, he had a column named "Karşılaşmalar" in the daily newspaper Radikal.

Kaplanoğlu is noted for his support for the governing Justice and Development Party and the President of Turkey, Recep Tayyip Erdoğan. Kaplanoğlu's critics attributed the generous public funding his production company received in 2019 to his good relationship with the government.

=== Family ===
Kaplanoğlu is married to journalist, author and screenwriter Leyla İpekçi, who is a niece of the assassinated notable journalist Abdi İpekçi. Between 2006 and 2013, Leyla İpekçi wrote for Zaman and Taraf, daily newspapers affiliated with the Gülen movement. At the time, Taraf and Zaman facilitated the movement's outreach to a broader public as they gained power in Turkey in illegal and extralegal ways. The Turkish government closed down both newspapers after the 2016 Turkish coup d'état attempt, for which they held the Gülen movement responsible. Kaplanoğlu claimed that he, like others, was cheated by the Gülen movement.

== Filmography ==
Year	Title	Director	Writer	Producer	Editor
2001	Away from Home	Yes			
2005	Angel's Fall	Yes	Yes	Yes	Yes
2007	Egg	Yes	Yes	Yes	Yes
2008	Milk	Yes	Yes	Yes	
2010	Honey	Yes	Yes	Yes	Yes
2017	Grain	Yes	Yes	Yes	
2019	Commitment	Yes			
2021	Commitment Hasan	Yes			

== Awards ==
- 2001 Ankara International Film Festival - Best Film for Herkes Kendi Evinde
- 2001 Istanbul International Film Festival - Best Turkish Film of the Year for Herkes Kendi Evinde (tied with Dar Alanda Kısa Paslaşmalar (2000))
- 2002 Singapore International Film Festival - Silver Screen Award for Best Director with Herkes Kendi Evinde
- 2005 Istanbul International Film Festival - FIPRESCI Prize for Meleğin Düşüşü
- 2005 Nantes Three Continents Festival - Golden Montgolfiere for Meleğin Düşüşü
- 2006 International Film Festival of Kerala - Golden Crow Pheasant for Meleğin Düşüşü
- 2006 Nuremberg Film Festival "Turkey-Germany" - Prize of the Young Filmmakers for Meleğin Düşüşü
- 2007 Valdivia International Film Festival - Best Director for Egg
- 2007 Antalya Golden Orange Film Festival - Best Picture, Best Screenplay, NETPAC Jury Award for Best Picture for Egg
- 2007 World Film Festival of Bangkok - Best Director (Harvest of Talents competition) for Egg
- 2008 Fajr International Film Festival - Crystal Simorgh for Best Director (for Egg)
- 2010 Golden Bear at the 60th Berlin International Film Festival for Bal

Awards
Preceded by Önder Çakar	Golden Orange Award for Best Screenplay; 2007 for Yumurta shared with Orçun Köksal	Succeeded by Ben Hopkins
