= SOS (Turkish Cypriot band) =

Turkish Cypriot rock band

- Origin: Morphou, Northern Cyprus
- Genres: Rock
- Years active: 1987 – present
- Members: Kamil Atik (guitar); Mehmet Zeyin (guitar); Muhittin Yangın (vocal); Mehmet Özçelik (bass); Tevfik Özberek (drums)

SOS is a Turkish Cypriot rock band from Morphou, Northern Cyprus.

The band was formed in 1987 with its current band members (with the exception of Özberek) with the initiative of the guitarist Kamil Atik in Morphou. The first years of the band was centered on an idealistic ideology, with covers of foreign-language songs and composition of songs about peace. However, the band gradually grew monetary concerns and started to perform popular songs at weddings and profitable locations. During this period, Kemal Dürüst, the former Turkish Cypriot Minister of Education, was part of the group as its keyboardist and violinist, but had to leave because of his university education.

They released their first cassette in 1987, the year the band was established, and have released a number of cassettes since then. They became popular with the Turkish Cypriot youth. The band views rock music as a way of relieving "societal depression". In the 2000s, during the rallies for the Annan Plan for Cyprus, they became symbolic of the support for the plan and performed to audiences exceeding 80,000 people. The group has been active in performing the election songs of political parties. In 2014, they released an album where they interpreted Turkish Cypriot folk songs in their own style. They perform at numerous festivals across Northern Cyprus, along with bars and clubs in North Nicosia and Kyrenia.

The current band members are:

- Kamil Atik – Guitar
- Mehmet Zeyin – Guitar
- Muhittin Yangın – Vocal
- Mehmet Özçelik – Bass
- Tevfik Özberek – Drums
