= Hepsi Hit Vol. 1 =

Studio album by Hande Yener
- Released: 6 June 2016
- Recorded: 2016
- Genre: EDM · pop
- Length: 37:33
- Label: Poll
- Producer: Polat Yağcı

Hande Yener chronology
İki Deli (2015)	Hepsi Hit Vol. 1 (2016)	Hepsi Hit Vol. 2 (2017)

Hepsi Hit Vol. 1 (All Hits Vol. 1) is the twelfth studio album by Turkish singer Hande Yener. It was released on 6 June 2016 by Poll Production. After releasing Mükemmel in 2014, Yener started to collect songs for her upcoming projects, and in mid 2015 she announced that different pieces for her new album were ready and set to be released at an appropriate time. In the early 2016, the title of the album was announced, and the recording phase started at the studio. Out of the 120 songs that she had received, she chose 20 of them for recording and as the production company was satisfied with all the pieces, they decided to release Hepsi Hit in two separate volumes.

Hepsi Hit Vol. 1's lead single, "Mor", was released on 30 May 2016 and ranked first on Turkey's official music chart for three weeks.

== Background ==
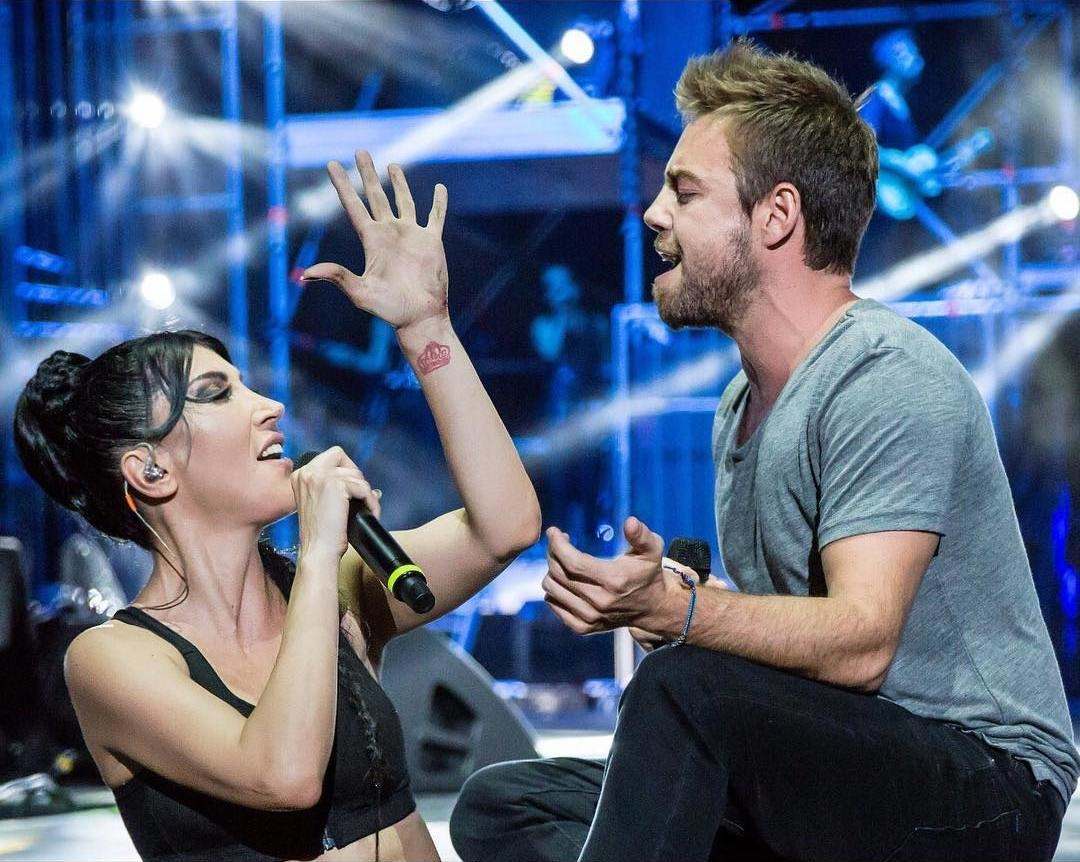
The album marked Yener's first collaboration with Murat Dalkılıç, who wrote the song "Görev" for her new album.

After working with Sinan Akçıl on three of her studio albums, in 2013 Yener started taking songs from Berksan and released the single "Ya Ya Ya Ya". Their collaboration continued on her next studio album Mükemmel (2014). Alongside Berksan, Yener started working with Mert Ekren for her new album and again collected songs written by Altan Çetin, who had written and composed a number of her early hits. 2015 marked another new collaboration for Yener as she started working with Ersay Üner, who wrote and composed the song "Sebastian" for her new album, but with Polat Yağcı's suggestion, Yener added the song to Volga Tamöz's album No. 2 and became one of the featuring artists on this album. All of these names became figures who eventually contributed to Yener's twelfth studio album. In July 2015, Yener discussed her upcoming twelfth studio album and said: "My album's songs are already ready. But I'm not thinking about releasing anything now. [...] At an appropriate time, when I'm done, I'll release them." The next month she released the single "Kışkışşş", and by the end of the year her new duet with Serdar Ortaç, "İki Deli", together with a compilation album with the same title were released. On 20 January 2016, it was announced that the album would be titled Hepsi Hit and released on 6 June 2016.

== Title ==
Yener later said that she had not spent a lot of time on finding a title for the album, and in March 2016, when coming out of the studio where she was recording her new songs, she said: "The songs in the album were all songs that would be hits. When one of my friends also said that these song would all become hits, I decided to title the album as such."

== Music and lyrics ==
Containing 10 songs in total, Hepsi Hit Vol 1.'s lead single, "Mor", was composed by Mert Ekren under inspiration from her 2004 hit "Kırmızı". The chorus of the two songs also resemble each other, with "Kırmızı" containing the lyrics "Sana kırmızı çok yakışıyor. (Red suits you very well.)" and "Mor" having "Yakıştı ama sana mor renk çok. (The color purple suits you very much)". Continuing with "Mor"'s high tempo, Ersay Üner wrote and composed "Emrine Âmâde", in which the singer discusses her admiration for her beloved with a third person point of view and this changes to the first person point of view in the chorus. The fourth song "Kavuşabilir miyiz?", written and composed by Mert Ekren, has a low tempo and was compared by some critics to Yener's 2004 song "Acı Veriyor". The next three songs, "Deli Bile", "Seviyorsun" and "Bilmiyor", were all written by Altan Çetin; the first of this trio is a vibrant song, while the two others have a low tempo. "Seviyorsun" features oriental elements and "Bilmiyor" has elements of Western music. The seventh song, "Vah Vah", composed by Mert Ekren, and "Bu Kafayla", composed by Ersay Üner, are both dance songs. The album's ninth song, "Görev", is a slow song, written and composed by Yener's colleague Murat Dalkılıç. The tenth and final song in the album, "Biri Kaybediyor", was the only piece written by Berksan and has samples from Okay Temiz's song "Denizaltı Rüzgârları" in its composition.

== Critical reception ==
Hepsi Hit Vol. 1 received mixed reviews from music critics. Hürriyet's Naim Dilmener gave the album three out of five and did not find it bad, but believed that the songs were not good enough based on Yener's current status and wrote: "It doesn't seem that this album, or any of the songs in it, will be able to direct our pop music market, make themselves known, or affect millions of listeners. It's become another improper step, and another improper Hande Yener album." A year later, with the release of Hepsi Hit Vol. 2, Dilmener again discussed Hepsi Hit Vol. 1 in his review and wrote: "Forget the whole album, not even a half of it was a hit. Only one of the songs could make itself talked about: Altan Çetin's 'Deli Bile'. And to some extent, 'Mor'." Hayat Müzik's critic Yavuz Hakan Tok believed that the songs in the album resembled Yener's previous works and added: "At least, I'm listening to this album for now. Even if I don't listen to it, I'll be exposed to it at the places where I go in summer anyway, so I'll have fun with it, and even let myself go with it occasionally. I don't expect any more because then I'll be left unsatisfied with my expectations. If Hande Yener is happy with this situation, then it means that there should be no problem. 'They are all hits or not hits, who cares?"

Writing for Dilimin Ayarı Yok, Cem Özsancak liked the album and said: "It is possible to say that Hande Yener did not play the only main role in this album because compared to her previous albums, where the sounds were on the foreground, in Hepsi Hit the focal point has been the compositions and the infrastructures that serve the songs. Together with at least one song that can satisfy all of the audience that she has addressed during her 16-year music career, there is a line, a common spirit, and a sense of integrity in the album despite Yener's musical diversity."

== Promotion ==
=== Live performances ===
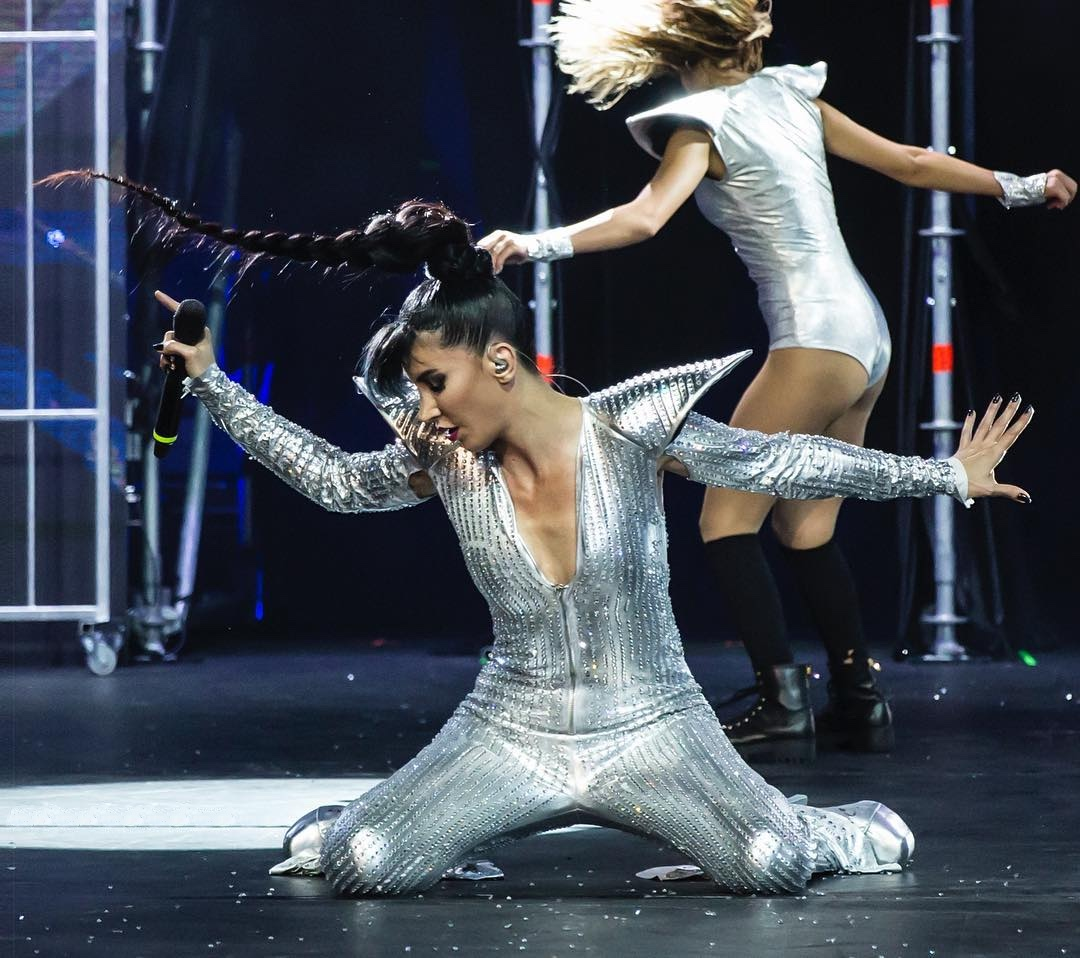
Yener performing "Bu Kafayla" at the Cemil Topuzlu Open-Air Theatre

To promote Hepsi Hit Vol. 1, Hande Yener appeared on a number of television programs and gave various concerts. On 26 June 2016, she appeared on Kanal D's program Kısmetse Olur and performed the song "Mor". On 9 August, she had a concert at the Cemil Topuzlu Open-Air Theatre for the third time during her career and performed all of the songs from her new album. During the concert, Mert Ekren and Murat Dalkılıç made appearances on stage and performed the songs "Kavuşabilir miyiz?" and "Görev" together with Yener. While performing the song "Biri Kaybediyor", Yener's son Çağın accompanied his mother as a DJ. Sözcü noted that Yener's first appearance on stage in a giant cage was similar to the theme that Madonna had used at a number of her shows. Yener's outfits and costumes were also found similar to those of Madonna's. Late on 3 October, Yener appeared at a fundraising event for Kasımpaşa Nursery and performed the songs "Mor", "Emrine Âmâde", "Deli Bile", "Seviyorsun" and "Bu Kafayla". In January 2017, she appeared at the Ülker Sports and Event Hall and performed the songs "Mor", "Deli Bile" and "Emrine Âmâde" at the half-time show organized for the Basketball Super League All-Star.

=== Music videos ===
The first music video for Hepsi Hit Vol. 1, "Mor", was released on 2 June 2016. The video was directed by Gülşen Aybaba and recorded over the course of twelve hours at the Maslak Arena. Yener was accompanied by four male dancers, and Kısmetse Olur's contestant Eser West also made an appearance in the video. The song ranked first on Turkey's official music chart for three consecutive weeks. The next music videos for the album were made for the songs "Deli Bile", "Emrine Âmâde" and "Seviyorsun".

== Track listing ==
No.	Title	Writer(s)	Length
1.	"Mor"	Mert Ekren · Hande Yener	3:08
2.	"Emrine Âmâde"	Ersay Üner	3:39
3.	"Kavuşabilir miyiz?"	Mert Ekren	3:38
4.	"Deli Bile"	Altan Çetin	3:49
5.	"Seviyorsun"	Altan Çetin	3:39
6.	"Bilmiyor"	Altan Çetin	4:05
7.	"Vah Vah"	Mert Ekren	2:45
8.	"Bu Kafayla"	Ersay Üner	4:44
9.	"Görev"	Murat Dalkılıç	3:58
10.	"Biri Kaybediyor"	Berksan · Okay Temiz	4:08
Total length:			37:33

== Personnel ==
- Hande Yener – vocals (all of the songs), songwriter (1), supervisor
- Mert Ekren – songwriter (1, 3, 7), composer (1, 3, 7), arranger (1, 3, 7), vocals (3), bass guitar (3)
- Altan Çetin – songwriter (4, 5, 6), composer (4, 5, 6), arranger (4)
- Murat Dalkılıç – songwriter (9), composer (9), vocals (9)
- Berksan – songwriter (10), composer (10)
- Okay Temiz – composer (10)
- Caner Güneysu – acoustic guitar (1, 3), classic guitar (1, 3)
- Altuğ Öncü – cümbüş (1), oud (3)
- Ersay Üner – songwriter (2, 8), composer (2, 8), arranger (8)
- Gürsel Çelik – arranger (2)
- Catwork – arranger (4)
- Gürsel Çelik – arranger (5, 6)
- Serkan Ölçer – arranger (9), guitar (9), bass guitar (9), piano (9)
- Çağın Kulaçoğlu – arranger (10)
- Gültekin Kaçar – guitar (2, 5, 6)
- Caner Güneysu – electro guitar (7)
- Tarcüş – oud (2)
- Ali Yılmaz – cümbüş (2), oud (5)
- Gündem – bowed string instruments (2, 5)
- Cengiz Ercümer – percussion (2)
- İlker Bayraktar – recording (2, 5, 6)
- Tufan Taş – mixing (1, 2)
- Özer Yener – recording (8), miks (9)
- Özgür Yurtoğlu – mixing (2, 5)
- Mesut Kahramanoğlu – mixing (4), recording (4)
- Murat Yelken – mixing (6)
- Tufan Taş – mixing (7)
- Bora Uzer – mixing (8)
- Ümit Kuzer – mixing (10)
- Göksun Çavdar – brass section (4)
- Tevfik Kulak – brass section (4)
- Anıl Şallıel – brass section (4)
- Türker Dinletir – wind instruments (5)
- Sergei Galinav – violoncello (6)
- Ece Ölçer – accordion (9), bowed string instruments (9)
- Atıl Aksoy – Rhodes (9)
- Çağlar Türkmen – mastering (all of the songs)
- Ömer Sinan Candan – production coordinator
- Hakan Akkaya – concept, costume
- Cem Talu – photographer
- Özge Özel – hair stylist, makeup
- Ahmet Terzioğlu – graphic design

Credits adapted from Hepsi Hit Vol. 1's album booklet.

== Charts ==
Chart (2016)	Peak position
Turkey (D&R Best-Selling)	7

== Release history ==
Country	Date	Format(s)	Label	Ref.
Turkey	6 June 2016	CD · digital download	Poll Production	
Worldwide	6 June 2016	Digital download	Poll Production	
