= Milk (2008 Turkish film) =

- Directed by: Semih Kaplanoglu
- Written by: Semih Kaplanoglu; Orçun Köksal
- Produced by: Semih Kaplanoglu
- Starring: Melih Selcuk; Başak Köklükaya
- Cinematography: Özgür Eken
- Edited by: François Quiqueré
- Release date: 1 September 2008 (VFF)
- Running time: 102 minutes
- Country: Turkey
- Language: Turkish

Milk (Turkish: Süt) is a 2008 Turkish drama film directed by Semih Kaplanoglu.

== Cast ==
- Melih Selcuk - Yusuf
- Başak Köklükaya - Zehra
- Rıza Akın - Ali Hoca
- Saadet Aksoy - Semra
