= Animacionerite =

Bulgarian alternative electronic band

Animacionerite (Bulgarian: Анимационерите) is alternative electronic Bulgarian band from Sofia, under the AveNew label.

The band was established in 1997. In 2000, it won MM award for best alternative rock single for the single "Красива Лулу" and in 2004, award for best Bulgarian album for their album Плюс (Plus). The band reunited to play concerts.

Main members included Georgi Zgurov (a.k.a. Gurko, on lead vocals), Nikolay Bekriev (guitar, lyrics), Tsvetan Methodiev (synthesizers, arranging, programming), Marin Petrov (bass guitar) and Vladimir Vassilev (drums). Other members included Petar Borisov and Georgi Ignatov.

== Discography ==
=== Albums ===
- 2000 - A, 13.04.2000
- 2003 - Plus, 25.11.2003
- 2016 - Animacionerite, 13.05.2016
