= Genco Ecer =

Turkish Cypriot singer and athlete

- Born: 13 December 1985 (age 39); Ankara, Turkey
- Genres: Turkish pop music, dance
- Occupation: Singer-songwriter
- Years active: 2009–present
- Labels: Seyhan Müzik; DMC; Poll Production; PDND Müzik
- Website: gencoecer.com.tr

Genco Ecer (Turkish: [ˈɡendʒo ˈedʒeɾ]; born 13 December 1985) is a Turkish Cypriot singer and athlete. Prior to his music career, Ecer represented Northern Cyprus in its national basketball and swimming team. In 2009, Ecer released his debut album Kandıramazsın. The album is a blend of R&B, funky house, and pop. He gained success with his single "U Dönüşü".

== Biography ==
Ecer was born in Ankara, Turkey to an Ankara-native mother and a Turkish Cypriot father. At a young age he moved with his family to Cyprus. He spent his secondary education at the Bayraktar Türk Maarif Koleji and then the Türk Maarif Koleji. Ecer also studied architecture at the Near East University.

== Discography ==
=== Studio albums ===
- Kandıramazsın (2009)

=== Singles ===
- "U Dönüşü" (2009)
- "Yalvarırım" (2011)
- "Vur" (2017)
- "Zor Kurtarmışım" (2018)
- "Kalp Kıranlara" (2019)
- "Yarım Kalan" (feat. Oneblood) (2020)
- "Oluruna Bıraktım" (2020)
- "Nerede Bu?" (2020)
- "Legal" (2021)
- "Konu O Olunca" (with İrem Derici) (2021)
- "Karma" (with Ece Seçkin and Anıl Piyancı) (2022)
- "OF!OF!OF!" (2023)
- "Yüreğimi Yorma" (2024)
- "Maşallah" (with Aygün Kazımova) (2024)
