= Kamen Kalev =

Bulgarian film director and screenwriter (born 1975)

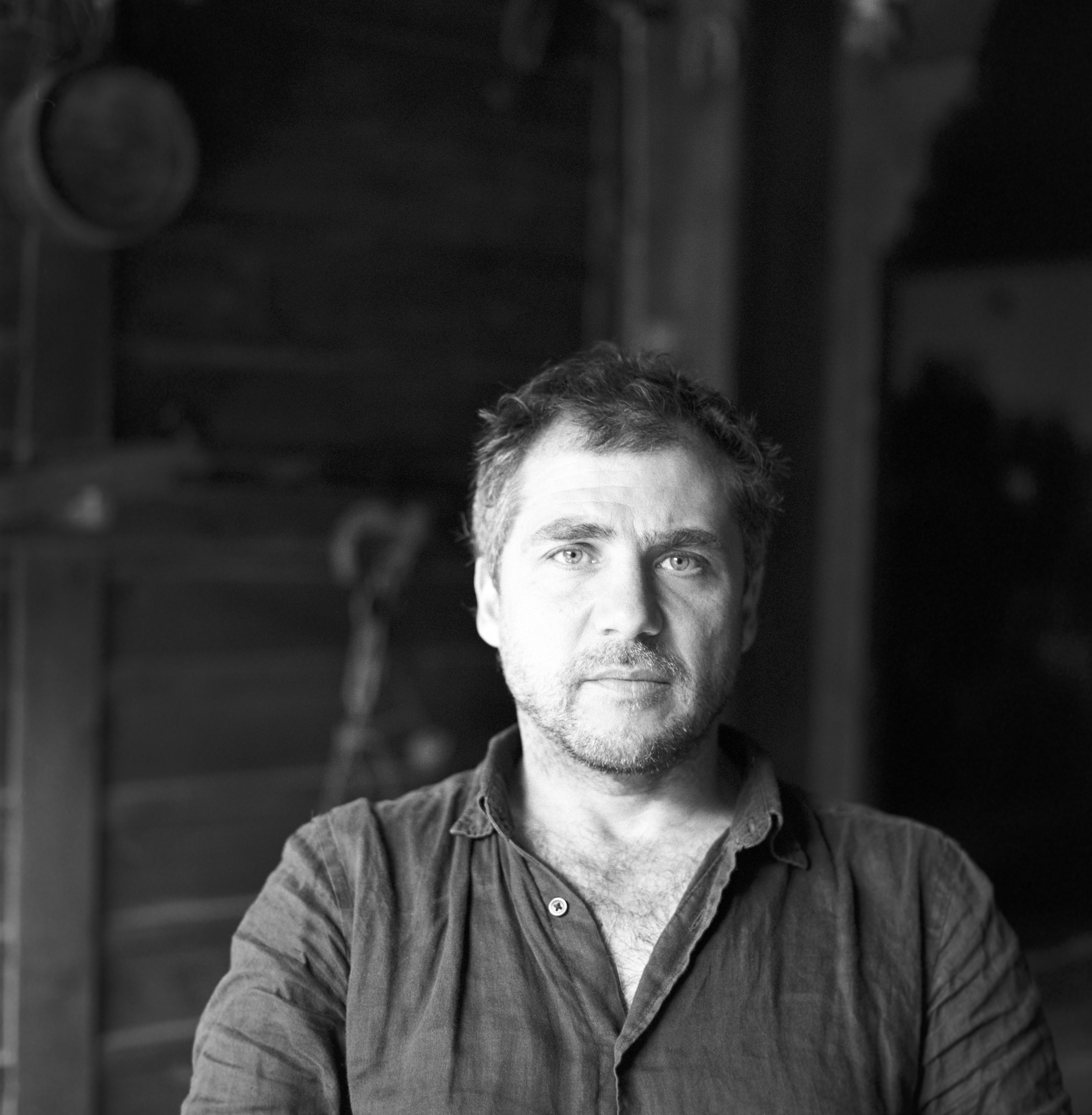
- Kalev in 2021
- Born: 8 June 1975; Bourgas, Bulgaria
- Education: drama school
- Alma mater: La Femis, Paris
- Occupations: film director, screenwriter
- Employer: Waterfront Film
- Notable work: Eastern Plays
- Website: www.waterfrontfilm.net

Kamen Kalev (Bulgarian: Камен Калев) (born 8 June 1975) is a Bulgarian film director and screenwriter. Kalev came to prominence in 2009 with the film Eastern Plays, earning him numerous international film awards as director and screenwriter.

After graduating a high school in his hometown Bourgas, Kamen Kalev spent two years in Krastyo Sarafov National Academy for Theatre and Film Arts in Sofia, Bulgaria, studying at first photography, and then switched to cinematography. During his sophomore year he continued his education in moviemaking in the French state film school La Fémis in Paris. Kalev graduated Le Département Image in 2002.

== Early works ==
As an author of short films, Kamen Kalev participated in numerous movie competitions and film festivals, earning some international recognition. He is also the author of more than sixty music videos and commercials.

In 2005 and 2007, along with co-author Dimitar Mitovski, Kamen Kalev presented two short films at the Cannes Film Festival––Get the Rabbit Back and Rabbit Troubles.

== Feature films ==
Kalev's first feature film, Eastern Plays, had its premiere on 6 October 2009 in Burgas, and was first shown at the Sarajevo Film Festival. It was the first Bulgarian film to be selected for the Cannes Film Festival since 1990. The film participated in the Film Festival's Directors' Fortnight's official selection. Although it did not win an award, the film gained high praise and the afterwards received many awards from international film festivals, becoming one of the most awarded Bulgarian films. As well as being screenwriter and director of Eastern Plays, Kamen Kalev co-produced the movie along with Stefan Pirjov through their partnership production company Waterfront Film. Other film production houses that co-produced the movie were 'Chimney Pot', the Swedish 'Film i Väst' and 'Art Eternal' (Bulgaria).

In the summer of 2010 Kalev started work on his second feature film, The Island, which he wrote, produced and directed. The film, which was mainly shot on St. Anastasia Island in the Black Sea, starred the French super-model Laetitia Casta, filmmaker Alejandro Jodorowsky and the Scandinavian actor Thure Lindhardt. The film premiered on 16 May 2011 in the Directors' Fortnight at the 2011 Cannes Film Festival.

== Filmography ==
=== Short films ===
- Never Stop
- Orpheus
- Maltonius Olbren
- Get the Rabbit Back
- Rabbit Troubles

=== Feature films ===
- Eastern Plays (2009)
- The Island (2011)
- Bridges of Sarajevo (2014)
- Face Down (2015)
- February (2020)

== Awards ==
- Tokyo International Film Festival 2009
  - Award for Best Director
- Warsaw International Film Festival 2009
  - 1-2 Competition Award (competition for directors' first and second feature films)
- International Film Festival Bratislava 2009
  - Best Director
  - Prize of the Ecumenical Jury (Kamen Kalev)
- Las Palmas de Gran Canaria International Film Festival 2010
  - Best First Time Director
