= Morphou =

Morphou: Μόρφου (Greek); Güzelyurt (Turkish)
- Municipality
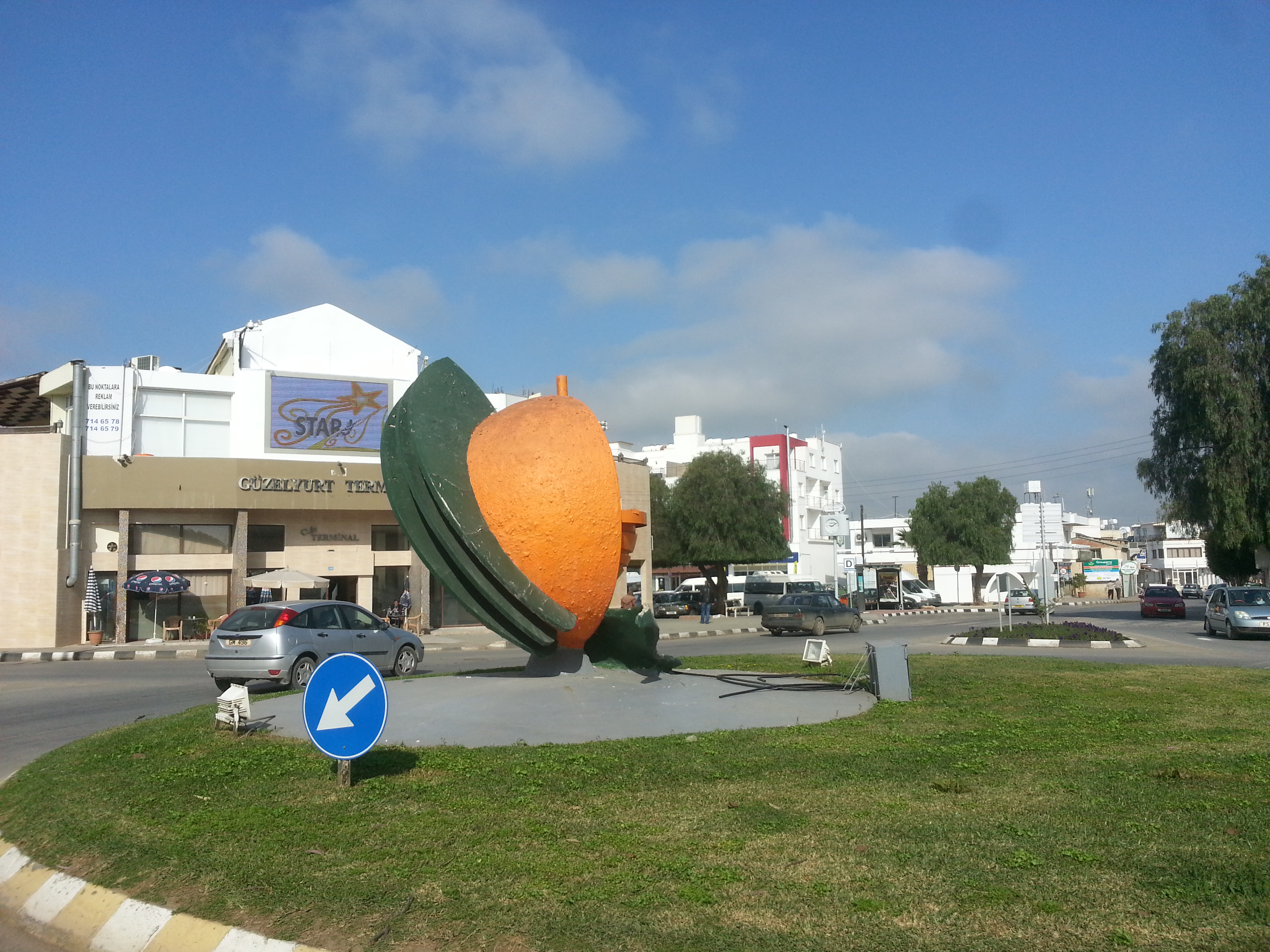
- The symbolic orange monument at the center of Morphou, representing the town's citrus industry

- Morphou in Cyprus.
- Coordinates: 35°11′53″N 32°59′38″E
- Country (de jure): Cyprus
  - District: Nicosia District
- Country (de facto): Northern Cyprus
  - District: Güzelyurt District

Government
  - Mayor (de jure): Victor Hadjiavraam
  - Mayor (de facto): Mahmut Özçınar

Population (2019)
  - Total: 24,070
- Time zone: UTC+2 (EET)
  - Summer (DST): UTC+3 (EEST)
- Website: Morphou Municipality; Municipality of Güzelyurt

Morphou (Greek: Μόρφου; Turkish: Güzelyurt, previously Omorfo) is a town in the northwestern part of Cyprus, under the de facto control of Northern Cyprus. Having been a predominantly Greek Cypriot community before 1974, the town is now inhabited by Turkish Cypriots.

With a population of 18,000 people, the town is famous for its oranges, apples, vegetables, grapefruit and melons. A large proportion of the citrus fruits are exported and the remainder are turned into fruit juice and canned for local consumption and export. Morphou is also famous for its annual Orange Festival, which is a major event lasting two weeks.

== History ==
Morphou was founded by Spartans who brought with them the worship of Aphrodite. In the Middle Ages, the city was referred to as Morphou but also Theomorphou. In the 14th and 15th centuries, Morphou hosted royal casalia, where the profitable cultivation of sugar took place with the encouragement of the kings of Cyprus. The Morphou area grew more than half of Cyprus citrus fruits. In 16th and 17th centuries, during Ottoman period, Morphou was famous for its export of linen.

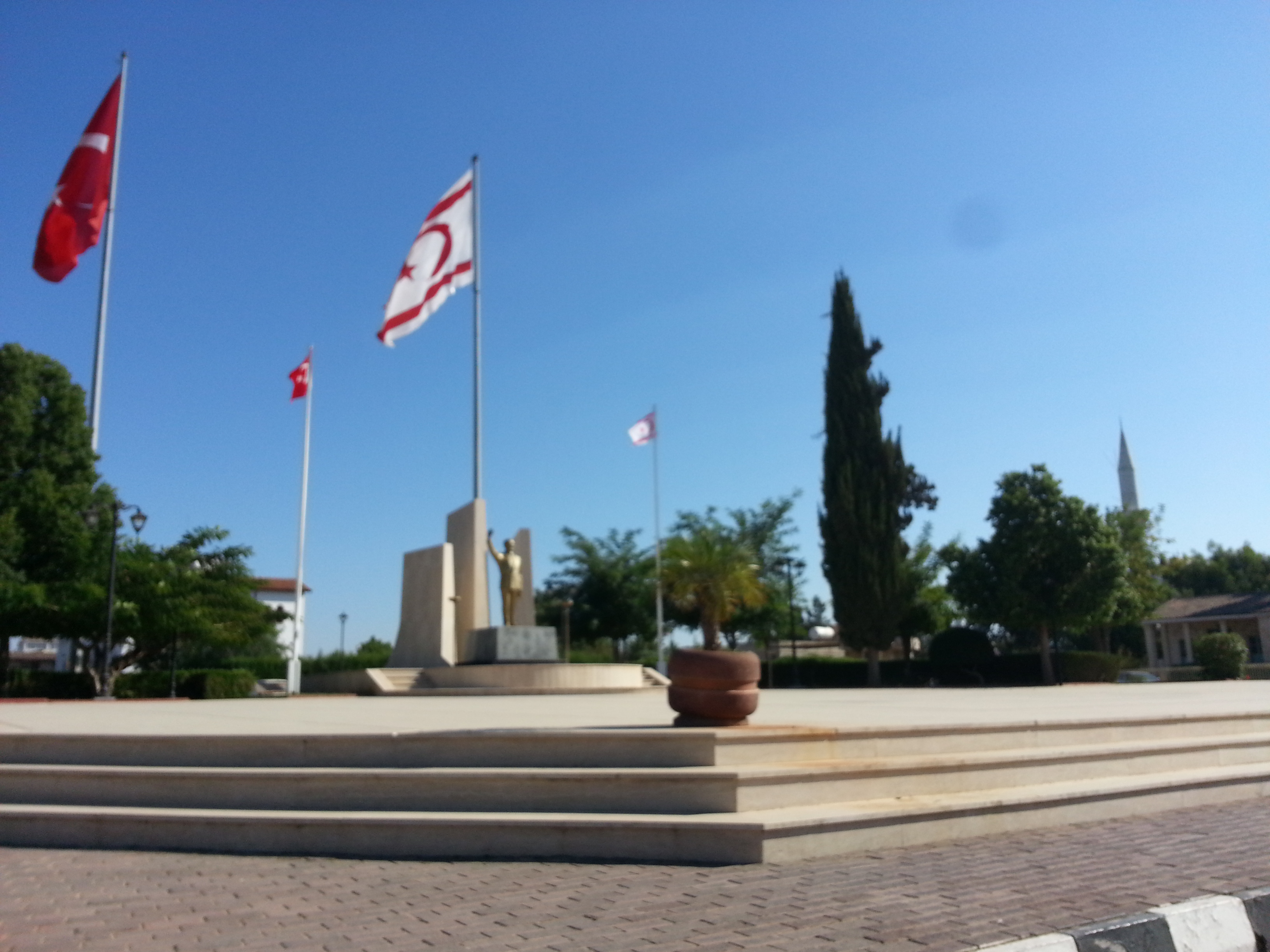
İnönü Square

Between 1907 and 1948, Morphou was one of the prominent stations of the Cyprus Government Railway.

In the wake of the intercommunal violence called "Bloody Christmas", the majority of the Turkish Cypriot population fled the town in January 1964, though one-third remained. As a result of the Turkish invasion of Cyprus in 1974, all of the Greek Cypriots of Morphou fled to the south of the island, and Morphou was inhabited by displaced Turkish Cypriots from the south. These people hailed from various villages in the Paphos district and the town of Paphos, though there were some who came from Limassol and the villages around it. This turned Morphou into a refugee town.

The agriculture in Morphou is expected to be boosted via the increase in irrigated farming by the help of the water pipe-line from Turkey.

=== Population ===
Before 1974, Morphou was an almost entirely Greek Cypriot community. According to the 1960 population census it was inhabited by 6480 Greek Cypriots, 123 Turkish Cypriots and 32 Maronites.

The population of Morphou increased slightly from 2006 to 2011. In 2019, State Planning Organization of Northern Cyprus recorded a population of 24,070 for Morphou.

== Mahalle ==
İsmet Paşa, Lala Mustafa Paşa and Piyale Paşa are quarters (mahalle) of Morphou.

== Education ==
In 2005, a Turkish state university, Middle East Technical University, opened its Northern Cyprus campus near Morphou, after the invitation of the Turkish and Turkish-Cypriot governments in 2000.

In 2016, another university called Cyprus Health and Social Sciences University was established as a private university in Morphou.

== Culture ==
The town is known for the annual Morphou Orange Festival, which has been organized by the municipality since 1977. The festival features local and Turkish singers and bands (the 2015 festival included many bands and singers including Model, Pinhani and SOS), modern and Latin dance shows, plays, fashion shows, traditional music and dance shows, sports competitions in several fields including football and darts and acrobatic shows. Along with the festival, the town annually hosts an Open Golf Tournament.

The town is home to two museums: the Icon Museum at the St Mamas Church and the Morphou History of Natural History and Archaeology. The latter is home to several specimens of native species that lived in Cyprus in different periods, as well as antiquities from the Neolithic Age to the Byzantine period. The St Mamas Church still annually hosts a Greek Cypriot liturgy. Bandabuliya (the closed market) is an important commercial center and was built in the 1930s in the British colonial architecture.

The town is the home of Binatlı Yılmaz S.K., a football club that spent the 2014-15 season in the KTFF 1. Lig, the second highest division. They finished the season in the third place and achieved promotion into the Süper Lig. The town is also home to Baf Ülkü Yurdu S.K., which will play in the 1. Lig in the 2015-16 season.

The municipality also runs the Morphou City Theater, a theatrical group that regularly puts on performances. The Morphou Theater Days are organized annually with the participation of the City Theater and other theaters from Northern Cyprus and Turkey. The organization reached 5000 viewers in 2014.

== Church ==
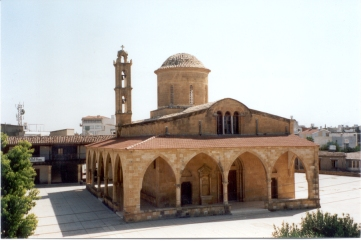
The St Mamas Church

It contains one of the many churches in the country dedicated to St. Mamas, popularly believed to have lived as a hermit in a cave near Morphou. According to local legend, he was a hermit living in very poor circumstances and when the authorities tried to tax him, he evaded them. Soldiers were sent out and captured him but on the way back to town, he saw a lion attacking a lamb, escaped the soldiers, saved the lamb, jumped on the lion's back and in that way came to town. His bravery earned him exemption from tax, hence his traditional attribute.

The church is now an icon museum.

== Notable people ==
- Philoumenos (Hasapis) of Jacob's Well (1913 – 1979), monk and saint
- Loukis Akritas (1908 – 1965), writer and politician

== Climate ==
Morphou has a borderline Mediterranean climate/semi-arid climate as the rest of the island where summers are hot and dry, and winters are cool and wet.

Climate data for Morphou
Month	Jan	Feb	Mar	Apr	May	Jun	Jul	Aug	Sep	Oct	Nov	Dec	Year
Mean daily maximum °C (°F)	16 (61)	16 (61)	17 (63)	21 (70)	26 (79)	28 (82)	31 (88)	32 (90)	30 (86)	26 (79)	22 (72)	18 (64)	24 (75)
Mean daily minimum °C (°F)	7 (45)	7 (45)	8 (46)	11 (52)	15 (59)	19 (66)	21 (70)	22 (72)	19 (66)	15 (59)	12 (54)	9 (48)	14 (57)
Average precipitation mm (inches)	73.6 (2.90)	60.9 (2.40)	60.9 (2.40)	17.7 (0.70)	10.2 (0.40)	0.0 (0.0)	0.0 (0.0)	0.0 (0.0)	5.1 (0.20)	27.9 (1.10)	38.1 (1.50)	109.2 (4.30)	403.6 (15.9)
Average rainy days	6	5	4	2	1	0	0	0	1	2	3	8	32
Average relative humidity (%)	72	70	69	73	70	70	69	69	70	69	72	73	71
Source: Weatherbase
