= 21st Ankara International Film Festival =

2010 film festival in Turkey

- Festival Poster
- Location: Ankara, Turkey
- Festival date: March 11–21, 2010
- Website: http://www.filmfestankara.org.tr/en

Ankara Film Festival
- 22nd 20th

The 21st Ankara International Film Festival was a film festival held in Ankara, Turkey that ran from March 11 to 21, 2010.

This edition of the Ankara Film Festival, organized by The World Mass Media Research Foundation and accredited by FIPRESCI, opened with a gala on the evening of March 10 at the Presidential Symphony Orchestra Concert Hall, at which the foundation special awards were presented, and closed with a screening of The Dust of Time (Greek: Η Σκόνη του Χρόνου) directed by Theodoros Angelopoulos.

11 films competed in the National Feature Competition, 28 films competed in the National Short Film Competition under fiction, experimental and animation categories and 17 films competed in the National Documentary Film Competition under amateur and professional categories. The festival films were shown at three venues, including Batı Movie Theaters, German Cultural Center and Çankata Municipality Contemporary Arts Center with the final awards being given out in a ceremony held at the Presidential Symphony Orchestra Concert Hall.

Among the filmmakers who were present to present their films at the festival were Siddiq Barmak, Aslı Özge and Aku Louhimies.

== Awards ==
=== Foundation special awards ===
- Aziz Nesin Endeavour Award: Turkish actress Filiz Akın
- Mass Media Award: NTV culture and art programme Gece Gündüz produced and presented by Yekta Kopan
- Oak of Art Award: Turkish poet Gülten Akın

=== National feature film competition awards ===
- Best Film Award: Men on the Bridge (Turkish: Köprüdekiler) directed by Aslı Özge
- Best Movie Director Award: Pelin Esmer for 10 to 11 (Turkish: 11'e 10 Kala)
- Best Leading Actor Award: Mert Fırat for Love in Another Language (Turkish: Başka Dilde Aşk)
- Best Leading Actress Award: Saadet Işıl Aksoy for Love in Another Language (Turkish: Başka Dilde Aşk)
- Best Supporting Actor Award: Volga Sorgu for Black Dogs Barking (Turkish: Kara Köpekler Havlarken)
- Best Supporting Actress Award: Selen Uçar for A Step into the Darkness (Turkish: Büyük Oyun)
- Best Screenplay Award: Pelin Esmer for 10 to 11 (Turkish: 11'e 10 Kala)
- Cinema Writers Association Best Film Award: Black Dogs Barking (Turkish: Kara Köpekler Havlarken) directed by Mehmet Bahadır Er and Maryna Gorbach
- Mahmut Tali Öngören Special Award: On the Way to School (Turkish: İki Dil Bir Bavul) directed by Orhan Eskiköy and Özgür Doğan

=== National documentary film competition awards ===
- Best Documentary Film Award: Prison No 5: 1980–1984 (Turkish: 5 Nolu Cezaevi: 1980–84) directed by Çayan Demirel
- Runner-up: The Children of September (Turkish: Eylül Çocukları) directed by Meltem Öztürk and Hülya Karcı

== National Programmes ==
=== National Feature Film Competition ===
==== National Feature Film Competition Jury ====
- Ertan Yılmaz
- Mahir Günşiray
- Tayfun Pirselimoğlu
- Fırat Yücel
- Hasan Ali Toptaş

==== SİYAD Jury ====
- Ali Hakan
- Bülent Vardar
- Elif Tunca

==== Films in Competition ====
- 10 to 11 (Turkish: 11'e 10 Kala) directed by Pelin Esmer.
- Black Dogs Barking (Turkish: Kara Köpekler Havlarken) directed by Mehmet Bahadır Er and Maryna Gorbach.
- How Are You? (Turkish: Kako Si?) directed by Özlem Akovalıgil.
- Love in Another Language (Turkish: Başka Dilde Aşk) directed by İlksen Başarır.
- Men On The Bridge (Turkish: Köprüdekiler) directed by Aslı Özge.
- On the Way to School (Turkish: İki Dil Bir Bavul) directed by Orhan Eskiköy.
- The Pain (Turkish: Acı) directed by Cemal Şan.
- Piano Girl (Turkish: Deli Deli Olma) directed by Murat Saraçoğlu.
- The Ringing Ball (Turkish: Çıngıraklı Top) directed by M. Egemen Ertürk.
- A Step into the Darkness (Turkish: Büyük Oyun) directed by Atıl İnaç.
- There (Turkish: Orada) directed by Hakkı Kurtuluş and Melik Saraçoğlu.

=== Out of Competition Screenings ===
- The Hopeless (Turkish: Umutsuzlar) directed by Yılmaz Güney.
- The Crab Game (Turkish: Yengeç Oyunu) directed by Ali Özgentürk.

=== National Documentary Film Competition ===
==== National Documentary Film Competition Jury ====
- Hakan Aytekin
- Hacı Mehmet Duranoğlu
- Yaprak İşçibaşı
- Özgür Şeyben
- Mutlu Binark

==== Amateur Films in Competition ====
- Baghdad (Turkish: Bağdat) directed by Berrak Samur
- On the Coast (Turkish: Bu Sahilde) directed by Merve Kayan and Zeynep Dadak
- The Silence Time (Turkish: Dema Bêzar) directed by Çiğdem Mazlum and Sertaç Yıldız
- The Wall (Turkish: Duvar) directed by Emre Karadaş and Deniz Oğuzsoy
- A Fatal Dress: Polygamy (Turkish: Kirasê Mirinê: Hewîtî) directed by Müjde Arslan
- The Song Of Romeika (Turkish: Romeyika'nın Türküsü) directed by Yeliz Karakütük
- The Cling (Turkish: Tutunmak) directed by Musa Ak
- The Colors of Zilan (Turkish: Zilan’ ın Renkleri) directed by Nagihan Çakar

==== Professional Films in Competition ====
- Prison No 5: 1980–1984 (Turkish: 5 Nolu Cezaevi: 1980–84) directed by Çayan Demirel
- The Children of September (Turkish: Eylül Çocukları) directed by Meltem Öztürk and Hülya Karcı
- Bullet and Pen (Turkish: Kurşun Kalem) directed by Mustafa Ünlü
- Lady Mukhtar (Turkish: Lady Muhtar) directed by Didem Şahin
- Miraz directed by Rodi Yüzbaşı
- An Argonaut in Ordu (Turkish: Ordu’da Bir Argonot) directed by Rüya Arzu Köksal
- Silicosis (Turkish: Silikozis) directed by Ethem Özgüven, Petra Holzer and Selçuk Erzurumlu
- The Last Season: Shawaks (Turkish: Demsala Dawî: Şewaxan) directed by Kazim Öz
- Coffee Futures (Turkish: Neyse Halim Çıksın Falim) directed by Zeynep Devrim Gürsel

=== Out of Competition Screenings ===
- 4857 directed by Ethem Özgüven, Petra Holzer and Selçuk Erzurumlu
- Thoughts on the Cinema of Halit Refiğ (Turkish: Halit Refiğ Sineması Üzerine Düşünceler) directed by Çetin Tunca.
- Istanbul Is Naked (Turkish: İstanbul Çıplak) directed by Zafer Biçen.
- Leyla and Mecnun Abroad (Turkish: Leyla en Mecnun in den vreemde) directed by Zeynep Özkaya.
- Memduh Ün: Big World Of Small People (Turkish: Memduh Ün: Küçük İnsanların Büyük Dünyası) directed by Çetin Tunca.
- The Losers (Turkish: Kaybedenler) directed by Gül Büyükbeşe Muyan.
- Passion of Metin Erksan (Turkish: Metin Erksan’ın Tutkusu) directed by Sadık Battal.

== International Programmes ==
=== Power and Rebellion ===
Power and Rebellion was selected as the basic theme of the festival in order, according to the organisers, to bring up the need for an uprise to the public agenda of the public, and because, In an era of uncertainty and abdication like today, we all need to watch these films and then think about our future once again.

- The Commute (Spanish: El Tránsito) directed by Elías León Siminiani.
- Rabbit à la Berlin (Polish: Królik po Berlinsku) directed by Bartosz Konopka.
- Living on Your Feet: The Struggles of Cipriano Mera (Spanish: Vivir de Pie: Las Guerras de Cipriano Mera) directed by Valentí Figueres.
- Confessions of an Economic Hitman directed by Stelios Kouloglou.
- Kavalar - The White Zone (German: Kavalar - Die Weisse Zone) directed by Ralf Küster.
- Stammheim (German: Stammheim - Die Baader-Meinhof-Gruppe vor Gericht) directed by Reinhard Hauff.
- If.... directed by Lindsay Anderson.
- Burn! (Italian: Queimada) directed by Gillo Pontecorvo.
- Red Psalm (Hungarian: Még kér a nép) directed by Miklós Jancsó.
- United Red Army (Japanese: 実録・連合赤軍 あさま山荘への道程) directed by Kôji Wakamatsu.
- Rosa Luxemburg directed by Margarethe von Trotta.
- Entranced Earth (Portuguese: Terra em Transe) directed by Glauber Rocha.
- Viva Maria! directed by Louis Malle.

=== Masters ===
The Masters programme exhibited new works by the world's most established and renowned filmmakers such as Robert Guédiguian, Theodoros Angelopoulos, Costa-Gavras, Michael Haneke.

- Achilles and the Tortoise (Japanese: アキレスと亀) directed by Takeshi Kitano.
- The White Ribbon (German: Das Weisse Band - Eine Deutsche Kindergeschichte) directed by Michael Haneke.
- Eden Is West (French: Eden à l'Ouest) directed by Costa-Gavras.
- Rembrandt's J'Accuse...! directed by Peter Greenaway.
- The Army of Crime (French: L'Armée du crime) directed by Robert Guédiguian.
- The Dust of Time (Greek: Η Σκόνη του Χρόνου) directed by Theodoros Angelopoulos.

=== From All Over the World ===
From All Over the World was a collection of premieres and prize-winning film selections which aims to present the best of current international filmmaking.

- Opium War directed by Siddiq Barmak.
- Backyard (Spanish: El traspatio) directed by Carlos Carrera.
- Tales from the Golden Age (Romanian: Amintiri din epoca de aur) directed by Hanno Höfer, Razvan Marculescu, Cristian Mungiu, Constantin Popescu & Ioana Uricaru.
- The Last Days of Emma Blank (Dutch: De laatste dagen van Emma Blank) directed by Alex van Warmerdam.
- The Investigator (Hungarian: A Nyomozó) directed by Attila Gigor.
- Johnny Mad Dog directed by Jean-Stéphane Sauvaire.
- Mary and Max directed by Adam Elliot.
- Metropia directed by Tarik Saleh.
- Breathless (Korean: Ddongpari) directed by Yang Ik-june.
- Tears of April (Finnish: Käsky) directed by Aku Louhimies.
- The Other Bank (Georgian: Gagma Napiri) directed by George Ovashvili.
- Letters to Father Jaakob (Finnish: Postia pappi Jaakobille) directed by Klaus Härö.
- Revanche directed by Götz Spielmann.
- Samson and Delilah directed by Warwick Thornton.

=== A Country: Brazil ===
A Country: Brazil was a lineup of 7 films, which aims to highlight the renaissance Brazilian Cinema has undergone in the 2000s.

- The Year My Parents Went on Vacation (Portuguese: O Ano em Que Meus Pais Saíram de Férias) directed by Cao Hamburger.
- Brainstorm (Portuguese: Bicho De Sete Cabeças) directed by Luiz Bolognesi.
- Estamira directed by Marcos Prado.
- BirdWatchers (Portuguese: La Terra Degli Uomini Rossi) directed by Marco Bechis.
- Estômago: A Gastronomic Story (Portuguese: Estômago) directed by Marcos Jorge.
- Elite Squad (Portuguese: Tropa de Elite) directed by José Padilha.
- Cinema, Aspirins and Vultures (Portuguese: Cinema, Aspirinas e Urubus) directed by Marcelo Gomes.

=== In Memoriam: Eric Rohmer ===
In Memoriam: Eric Rohmer was a selection of two films screened in memory of the new wave auteur Eric Rohmer, who died that year.

- Pauline at the Beach (French: Pauline à la plage) directed by Eric Rohmer.
- The Green Ray (French: Le Rayon vert) directed by Eric Rohmer.

=== Immortals at Cinema's Century ===
Immortals at Cinema's Century was a selection of four films screened to celebrate Akira Kurosawa’s 100th and Luis Buñuel’s 110th birthday.

- The Criminal Life of Archibaldo de la Cruz (Spanish: Ensayo de un crimen) directed by Luis Buñuel.
- Simon of the Desert (Spanish: Simón del desierto) directed by Luis Buñuel.
- Yojimbo (Japanese: 用心棒) directed by Akira Kurosawa.
- Throne of Blood (Japanese: 蜘蛛巣城) directed by Akira Kurosawa.

=== Midnight Cinema ===
Midnight Cinema was a late night screenings of the most bizarre films of the horror and thriller genres.

- Mom (Spanish: Mamá) directed by Andres Muschietti.
- Dead Snow (Norwegian: Død snø) directed by Tommy Wirkola.
- Deadspiel directed by Jay Molloy.
- Full Employment (German: Arbeit für Alle) directed by Thomas Oberlies & Matthias Vogel.

=== Afghan Dreams ===
- Addicted in Afghanistan directed by Jawed Taiman.
- Afghan Chronicles directed by Dominic Morissette.
- Yelda - The Longest Night directed by Roberto Lozano.

=== State of the World ===
- Painful Years (Dutch: Geslagen Jaren) directed by Anne-Mieke van den berg.
- The Heretics directed by Joan Braderman.
- The Real World Of Peter Gabriel directed by Georg Maas & Dieter Zeppenfeld.
- Listening to The Silence directed by Pedro Flores.
- Tobacco Girl (German: Tabakmädchen) directed by Biljana Garvanlieva.

== See also ==
- 2010 in film
- Turkish films of 2010
