= Festival on Wheels =

Film festival in Turkey

- Official Festival Logo
- Location: Turkey
- Awards: Golden Bull
- Website: http://www.festivalonwheels.org/default.aspx?page=about_festival

The Festival on Wheels (Turkish: 16 Gazici Festival) is an annual film festival, organised by the Ankara Cinema Association based in Ankara, Turkey, which has been held since 1995. Its mission is to present outstanding examples of cinema to film enthusiasts in different cities around Turkey and to introduce Turkish cinema to the rest of the world.

During its first 16 iterations the festival has visited the cities of Ankara, Artvin, Baku (Azerbaijan), Bursa, Çanakkale, Drama (Greece), Eskişehir, Gaziantep, Istanbul, Izmir, Kars, Kayseri, Malatya, Mersin, Ordu, Samsun, Sarajevo (Bosnia and Herzegovina) and T’blisi (Georgia).

The festival has held an International Competition since 2007 which currently awards First Prize (€10,000), Second Prize (€5000) and the SİYAD (Turkish Film Critics Association) Prize, as well as the Audience Award, a prize determined by the votes of the public and awarded to a short film screened in the festival.

The festival also puts on a programme of workshops to which it invites a number of filmmakers from Turkey and overseas.

== Editions ==
- 16th Festival on Wheels in Ankara, Artvin and Ordu, Turkey (December 3–9, 2010)

== Current Awards ==
=== Golden Bull Award ===
The Golden Bull is a film award which has been awarded annually since 2009 to the best film at the Festival on Wheels as selected by the international jury and currently carries a cash prize of €10,000.

- Golden Bull Award 2009: Police, Adjective (Romanian: Poliţist, Adjectiv) directed by Corneliu Porumboiu
- Golden Bull Award 2010: Illegal (French: Illégal) directed by Olivier Masset-Depasse

=== Silver Bull Award ===
The Silver Bull is a film award which has been awarded annually since 2009 to the second best film at the Festival on Wheels as selected by the international jury and currently carries a cash prize of €5,000.

- Silver Bull Award 2009: On the Way to School (Turkish: İki Dil Bir Bavul) directed by Orhan Eskiköy and Özgür Doğan
- Silver Bull Award 2010: Chongqing Blues (Chinese: 日照重慶) directed by Xiaoshuai Wang

=== SİYAD Award ===
The SİYAD Award is a film award which has been awarded annually since 2006 to the best film at the Festival on Wheels as selected by The Turkish Film Critics Association's jury.

=== Short Film Audience Award ===
The Short Film Audience Award is a film award which has been awarded annually since 2001 to the best short film at the Festival on Wheels as voted for by the festival going public.

== Former Awards ==
=== Golden Goose Award ===
The Golden Goose was a film award which was awarded annually from 2006 to 2008 to the best film at the Festival on Wheels as selected by the international jury.

=== Silver Goose Award ===
The Golden Goose was a film award which was awarded annually from 2006 to 2008 to the second best film at the Festival on Wheels as selected by the international jury.
