= 46th International Antalya Golden Orange Film Festival =

2009 Turkish film festival

- Festival Poster by Emrah Yucel
- Location: Antalya, Turkey
- Awards: Golden Orange
- Festival date: 10–17 October 2009
- Website: http://www.aksav.org.tr/en/

Antalya Film Festival
- 47th 45th

The 46th International Antalya Golden Orange Film Festival (Turkish: 46. Uluslararası Antalya Altın Portakal Film Festivali) was a film festival held in Antalya, Turkey which ran from 19 to 17 October 2009.

This edition of the International Antalya Golden Orange Film Festival was the first to be organised solely by the Antalya Foundation for Culture and Arts (AKSAV), a cultural body affiliated with the Antalya Greater Municipality, and the first to have an international section within the main body of the festival.

== Awards ==
=== National Feature Competition ===
- Best Film: Bornova Bornova directed by İnan Temelkuran and Cosmos (Turkish: Kosmos) directed by Reha Erdem
- Best First Film: On the Way to School (Turkish: İki Dil Bir Bavul) directed by Orhan Eskiköy and Özgür Doğan
- Best Director: Reha Erdem for Cosmos (Turkish: Kosmos)
- Best Screenplay: Onur Ünlü for Five Cities (Turkish: Beş Şehir)
- Best Actress: Nergis Öztürk for Envy (Turkish: Kıskanmak)
- Best Actor: Öner Erkan for Bornova Bornova
- Best Cinematographer: Florent Herry for Cosmos (Turkish: Kosmos)
- Best Music Score: Mehmet Erdem and Özgür Akgül for Piano Girl (Turkish: Deli Deli Olma)
- Best Supporting Actress: Damla Sönmez for Bornova Bornova
- Best Supporting Actor: Volga Sorgu for Black Dogs Barking (Turkish: Kara Köpekler Havlarken)
- Best Film Editor: Erkan Tekemen for Bornova Bornova
- Best Art Director: Zeynep Koloğlu for The Master (Turkish: Usta)
- Behlül Dal Jury Special Award: Bahadır Karataş for The Master (Turkish: Usta), Evrim Alataş for Min Dît: The Children of Diyarbakır (Kurdish: Min Dît / Turkish: Ben Gördüm), Tansu Biçer for Five Cities (Turkish: Beş Şehir) and Emre Şahin for 40
- Dr. Avni Tolunay Special Jury Award for Best Picture: Cosmos (Turkish: Kosmos) directed by Reha Erdem
