= 54th International Film Festival Rotterdam =

2025 edition of IFFR

- Official poster
- Opening film: Fabula by Michiel ten Horn
- Closing film: This City Is a Battlefield by Mouly Surya
- Location: Rotterdam, Netherlands
- Founded: 1972
- Awards: Tiger Award: Fiume o morte! by Igor Bezinović; Audience Award: I'm Still Here by Walter Salles; Robby Müller Award: Lol Crawley
- No. of films: 482
- Festival date: Opening: 30 January 2025; Closing: 9 February 2025
- Website: IFFR

International Film Festival Rotterdam
- 2026 2024

The 54th International Film Festival Rotterdam, is the 2025 edition of the International Film Festival Rotterdam, which was held from 30 January to 9 February 2025. The complete line-up of films competing in the festival was revealed on 17 December 2024. It opened with Fabula, a Dutch film by Michiel ten Horn.

The festival closed on 9 February 2025 with This City Is a Battlefield, an Indonesian war drama film written and directed by Mouly Surya. Fiume o morte! by Igor Bezinović of Sweden, Finland won the Tiger Award whereas, L’arbre de l’authenticité by Sammy Baloji from Democratic Republic of the Congo and Im Haus meiner Eltern by Tim Ellrich from Germany won the Special Jury Awards. The VPRO Big Screen Award was awarded to Raptures by Jon Blåhed from Sweden, Finland. I'm Still Here by Walter Salles, a Brazil and France co-production won the Audience Award. 482 films from 94 countries were showcased at the festival including 234 features, 248 short and mid-length films.

== Jury ==
=== Tiger Competition ===
- Yuki Aditya, Jakarta-based filmmaker, Festival Director of ARKIPEL International Documentary and Experimental Film Festival.
- Soheila Golestani, Iranian actress, voice actor, director, and writer
- Winnie Lau, Hong Kong singer and actress
- Peter Strickland, British film director and screenwriter
- Andrea Luka Zimmerman, Jarman Award winning artist, filmmaker and cultural activist

=== Tiger Short Competition ===
- Angela Haardt: German curator for media art. She was director of the International Short Film Festival Oberhausen
- Frank Sweeney: Filmmaker and artist
- Yaoting Zhang: An acquisitions and production manager who has previously served as programmer for the Shanghai and Beijing festivals

=== Big Screen Competition ===
- Bero Beyer: Dutch film producer. and former Festival Director of IFFR, from 2015 to 2020.
- Sara Rajaei: Iranian-Dutch video artist and filmmaker
- Dewi Reijs: Dutch-Indonesian filmmaker, actress, writer and director, and founder of Buddy Film Foundation.
- Digna Sinke: Dutch film director, producer and screenwriter
- Jia Zhao: Chinese-Dutch producer of award-winning documentaries like I Am So Sorry (Cannes 2021), Kabul, City in the Wind (IDFA Special Jury Award) and Inner Landscape, which closed IFFR in 2019.

== Official selection ==
=== Opening and closing films ===
English title	Original title	Director(s)	Production countrie(s)
Opening film
Fabula		Michiel ten Horn	Netherlands, Belgium, Germany
Closing film
This City Is a Battlefield	Perang Kota	Mouly Surya	Indonesia, Netherlands, Singapore, France, Norway, Philippines, Cambodia

=== Tiger Competition ===
The following films are selected to compete for the Tiger Award. The line-up was announced on 17 December 2024.

Highlighted titles indicates award winner

- L’arbre De l’Authenticité, Sammy Baloji, (Democratic Republic of the Congo)
- Bad Girl, Varsha Bharath, (India)
- Blind Love, Julian Chou (Taiwan)
- Fiume o morte!, Igor Bezinović (Croatia, Italy, Slovenia)
- La Gran Historia De La Filosofía Occidental, Aria Covamonas (Mexico)
- Guo Ran, Li Dongmei (China)
- Im Haus Meiner Eltern, Tim Ellrich (Germany)
- Perla, Alexandra Makarová (Austria-Slovakia)
- Primeira Pessoa Do Plural, Sandro Aguilar, (Portugal, Italy)
- Tears in Kuala Lumpur, Ridhwan Saidi, (Malaysia)
- Vitrival – The Most Beautiful Village in the World, Noëlle Bastin, Baptiste Bogaert (Belgium)
- Wind, Talk to Me Vetre, pricaj sa mnom, Stefan Djordjevic (Serbia, Slovenia, Croatia)
- Wondrous Is the Silence of My Master, Ivan Salatić (Montenegro)

=== Big Screen Competition ===
Highlighted titles indicates award winner

- Back to the Family - Šarūnas Bartas (Lithuania, France, Poland, Latvia)
- Raptures - Jon Blåhed (Sweden, Finland)
- Gowok: Javanese Kamasutra - Hanung Bramantyo (Indonesia)
- ¡Caigan las rosas blancas! - Albertina Carri (Argentina, Brazil, Spain)
- Our Father - The Last Days of a Dictator - José Filipe Costa (Portugal)
- Orenda - Pirjo Honkasalo (Finland, Estonia, Sweden)
- Yasuko, Songs of Days Past - Kichitaro Negishi (Japan)
- The Puppet’s Tale - Suman Mukhopadhyay (India)
- Bad Painter - Albert Oehlen (Germany, USA)
- Macai - Sun-J Perumal (Malaysia)
- L’oro del Reno - Lorenzo Pullega (Italy)
- De idylle - Aaron Rookus (Netherlands, Belgium, Estonia)
- The Assistant - Wilhelm Sasnal, Anka Sasnal (Poland, United Kingdom)
- Soft Leaves - Miwako Van Weyenberg (Belgium)

=== Tiger Short Competition ===
The following films were selected to compete for the Tiger Short Competition.

Highlighted titles indicates award winner

- Baby Blue Benzo dir. Sara Cwynar (United States, Germany)
- BAN♡ITS dir. Omar Chowdhury (Belgium, Bangladesh, South Korea)
- Bury Us in a Lone Desert dir. Nguyễn Lê Hoàng Phúc (Vietnam)
- Capitol Limited dir. Lily Ekimian Ragheb, Ahmed T. Ragheb (United States)
- Common Pear dir. Gregor Božič (Slovenia, United Kingdom)
- La durmiente dir. Maria Inês Gonçalves (Portugal, Spain)
- Empty Rider dir. Lawrence Lek (Switzerland, United Kingdom)
- The Garden of Electric Delights dir. Billy Roisz (Austria)
- Hepingli Playthrough dir. Zheng Yuan (China)
- I Wan'na Be Like You dir. Margit Lukács, Persijn Broersen (Netherlands, France, Belgium, United Kingdom, Germany)
- Memory Is an Animal, It Barks with Many Mouths dir. Eva Giolo (Belgium, Italy)
- Merging Bodies dir. Adrian Paci (Italy)
- A Metamorphosis dir. Lin Htet Aung (Myanmar)
- Now, Hear Me Good dir. Dwayne LeBlanc (United States)
- Les rites de passage dir. Florian Fischer, Johannes Krell (Germany)
- The Rock Speaks dir. Amy Louise Wilson, Francois Knoetze (South Africa, Spain)
- Suspicions About the Hidden Realities of Air dir. Sam Drake (United States)
- :Temo Re dir. Anka Gujabidze (Georgia)
- Things Hidden Since the Foundation of the World dir. Kevin Walker, Irene Zahariadis (Greece, United States)
- World at Stake dir. Susanna Flock, Adrian Jonas Haim, Jona Kleinlein (Austria)

=== Limelight ===
A programme showcasing cinematic highlights of film festival favourites and international award-winners.

English title	Original title	Director(s)	Production countrie(s)
Beating Hearts	L'Amour ouf	Gilles Lellouche	Belgium, France
This City Is a Battlefield		Mouly Surya	Indonesia
The Killers	더 킬러스	Kim Jong-kwan, Roh Deok, Chang Hang-jun, Lee Myung-Se	South Korea
The Surfer		Lorcan Finnegan	Australia, Ireland
Fabula		Michiel ten Horn	Netherlands, Belgium, Germany
Mariana's Room	La Chambre de Mariana	Emmanuel Finkiel	France
The Illusion	L’abbaglio	Roberto Andò	Italy
All We Imagine as Light		Payal Kapadia	France, India, Netherlands, Luxembourg, Italy
The Count of Monte Cristo	Le Comte de Monte-Cristo	Alexandre De La Patellière and Matthieu Delaporte	France
A Complete Unknown		James Mangold	United States
Get Away		Steffen Haars	United Kingdom
Vermiglio		Maura Delpero	Italy, France, Belgium
Thangalaan	தங்கலான்	Pa. Ranjith	India
Blazing Fists	Blue Fight 〜蒼き若者たちのブレイキングダウン〜	Takashi Miike	Japan
The Last Dance	破·地獄	Anselm Chan Mou Yin	Hong Kong
The Time It Takes	Il tempo che ci vuole	Francesca Comencini	Italy, France
U.S. Palmese		Manetti Bros.	Italy
I'm Still Here	Ainda Estou Aqui	Walter Salles	Brazil, France
Twilight of the Warriors: Walled In	九龍城寨之圍城	Soi Cheang	Hong Kong
Three Friends	Trois Amies	Emmanuel Mouret	France
Spermageddon		Tommy Wirkola, Rasmus A. Sivertsen	Norway
September 5		Tim Fehlbaum	Germany
The Seed of the Sacred Fig	دانه انجیر مقدس	Mohammad Rasoulof	Iran, Germany, France
Maria		Pablo Larraín	Italy, Germany
The Brutalist		Brady Corbet	United States, United Kingdom, Hungary
The Return		Uberto Pasolini	Italy, United Kingdom
Dead Talents Society	鬼才之道	John Hsu	Taiwan
Fly Away	பறந்து போ	Ram	India

=== Bright Future ===
The programme highlights first-feature films from promising filmmakers.

- Girl Infinite, Lilly Hu, United States, Latvia, Singapore
- Camp d’Été, Mateo Ybarra, Switzerland, France
- The Flamenco Guitar of Yerai Cortés (La guitarra flamenca de Yerai Cortés), Antón Álvarez, Spain
- Later In The Clearing, Márton Tarkövi, Hungary, Spain
- Nyamula (Invisible Flame), Oskar Weimar, Kenya
- Rains Over Babel (Llueve sobre Babel), Gala del Sol, Colombia, Spain and the United States
- Your Touch Makes Others Invisible, Rajee Samarasinghe, Sri Lanka, United States

=== Harbour ===
The programme showcases contemporary cinema.

- And The Rest Will Follow, Pelin Esmer, Turkey, Bulgaria, Romania
- Dead Dog, Sarah Francis, Lebanon
- Finding Ramlee, Megat Sharizal, Malaysia
- No Dejes A Los Niños Solos, Emilio Portes, Mexico
- Primitive Diversity, Alexander Kluge, Germany
- Thank You Satan, Hicham Lasri, Morocco, France
- Theatre, Nishanth Kalidindi, India
- Last Song for You, Jill Leung, Hong Kong
- The Night Is Dark and Brighter Than The Day, Christina Friedrich, Germany
- Un Gran Casino, Daniel Hoesl, Austria
- Olivia & the Clouds, Tomás Pichardo Espaillat, Dominican Republic

=== RTM ===
- Traffic, Teodora Ana Mihai, Romania, Belgium, Netherlands

=== Short & Mid-length ===
The Short & Mid-length film programme showcases films under 63 minutes.

- B AND S, Lipika Singh Darai, India
- GERHARD, Ulu Braun, Germany
- THE GREAT NORTH, Jenn Nkiru, United Kingdom
- THE LAST HARVEST, Nuno Boaventura Miranda, Cabo Verde, Portugal
- MY BROTHER, Saad Dnewar and Abdelrahman Dnewar, Egypt, Germany, France
- THE NON-ACTOR, Eliza Barry Callahan, United States
- A RIVER HOLDS A PERFECT MEMORY, Hope Strickland, United Kingdom, Jamaica
- SILVESTERCHLAUSEN, Andrew Norman Wilson, United States, Switzerland
- TELL HER WHAT HAPPENED TO ME, Pethrus Tibúrcio, Brazil
- THOUGHTS ON PEACE IN AN AIR RAID, Vyacheslav Turyanytsya, Ukraine, Netherlands
- A THOUSAND WAVES AWAY, Helena Wittmann, Germany
- UPON SUNRISE, Stefan Ivančić, Serbia, Spain, Slovenia, Croatia
- YOU’RE A SHADOW, Rajee Samarasinghe, Sri Lanka, United States
- IF YOU SEEK AMY, Ela Kazdal, United Kingdom, Turkey

== Awards ==
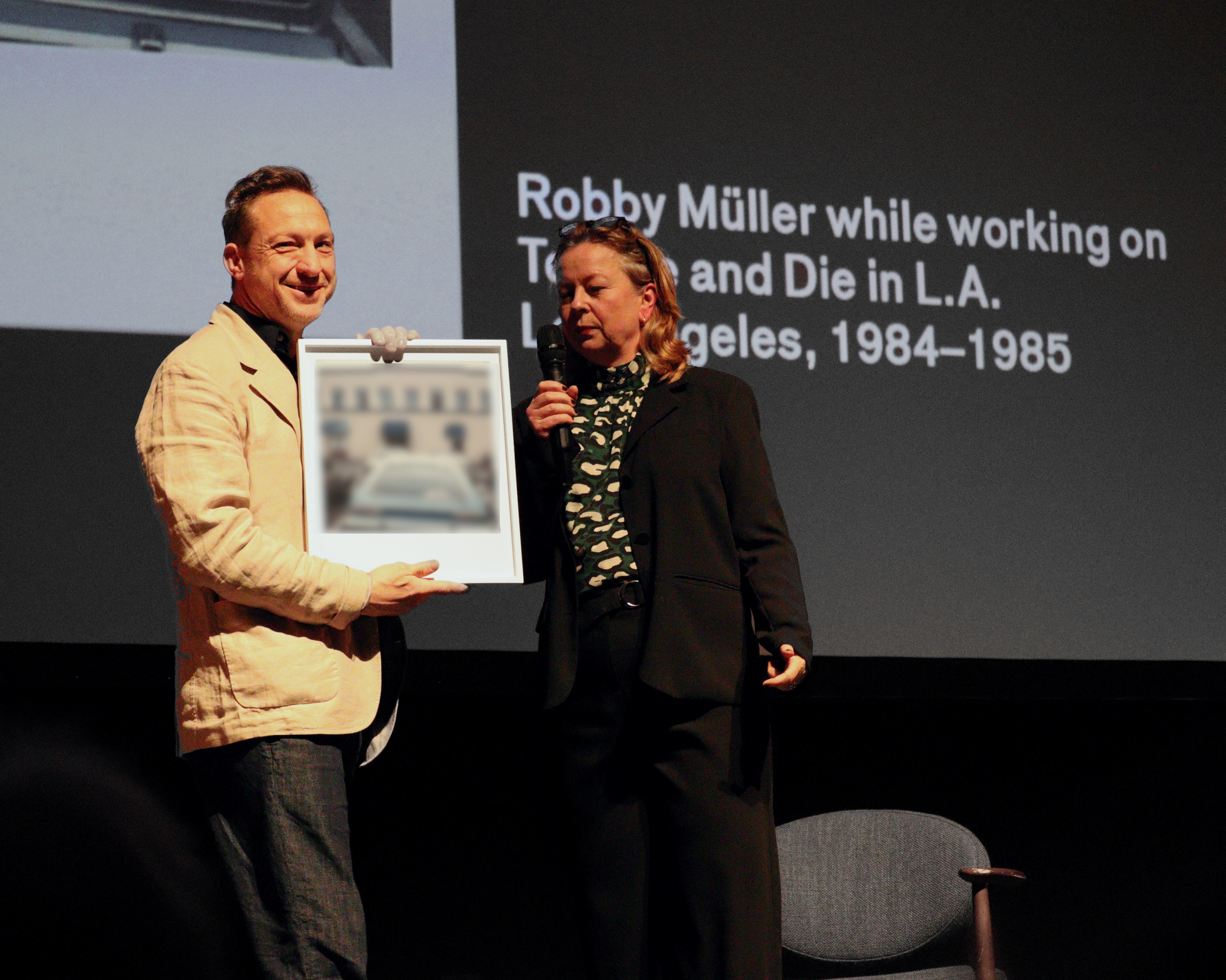
Lol Crawley receiving the Robby Müller Award

- Robby Müller Award: Lol Crawley

=== Tiger Award ===
- Fiume o morte!, Igor Bezinović, Croatia, Italy, Slovenia

Special Jury Awards

- L’arbre de l’authenticité, Sammy Baloji, Congo
- Im Haus meiner Eltern Tim Ellrich, Germany

=== VPRO Big Screen award ===
- Raptures, Jon Blåhed, Sweden, Finland

=== FIPRESCI Award ===
- Fiume o morte!, Igor Bezinović, Croatia, Italy, Slovenia

=== NETPAC Award ===
- Bad Girl Varsha Bharath, India

=== Youth Jury Award ===
- The Visual Feminist Manifesto, Farida Baqi, Syria, Lebanon, Germany, Sweden, Netherlands

=== Audience Award ===
- I'm Still Here by Walter Salles Brazil, France

=== Ammodo Tiger short awards ===
- A Metamorphosis, Lin Htet Aung (Myanmar), World Premiere
- Temo Re, Anka Gujabidze (Georgia), World Premiere
- Merging Bodies, Adrian Paci, (Italy), World Premiere

=== European Short Film Award nomination ===
- La Durmiente, Maria Inês Gonçalves (Portugal, Spain), World Premiere

=== KNF Award 2025 ===
- Temo Re, Anka Gujabidze, Georgia
