= Min Dît: The Children of Diyarbakır =

- Directed by: Miraz Bezar
- Written by: Miraz Bezar; Evrim Alataş
- Produced by: Miraz Bezar
- Starring: Şenay Orak; Muhammed Al; Hakan Karsak; Berivan Ayaz
- Cinematography: Isabelle Casez
- Music by: Mustafa Biber
- Production companies: Bezar Film; Corazón International
- Release dates: September 18, 2009 (San Sebastián); April 2, 2010 (Turkey)
- Running time: 102 mins
- Country: Turkey
- Language: Kurdish
- Box office: US$101,327

Min Dît: The Children of Diyarbakır (Kurdish: Min Dît, lit. 'I saw'), alternatively titled Before Your Eyes, is a 2009 Kurdish-language drama film directed by German-based Kurdish filmmaker Miraz Bezar, based on a story that he co-wrote with journalist and short-story writer Evrim Alataş, about street children in the eastern Turkish city of Diyarbakır. The film, which went on nationwide general release across Turkey on April 2, 2010, was the first Turkish film produced in Kurdish and won awards at film festivals in San Sebastian, where it premiered, Antalya and Istanbul.

== Production ==
Director Miraz Bezar, who was born in Ankara, Turkey but moved to Germany when he was nine years old, knew a lot about the Kurdish issue and the situation in eastern Turkey before he started writing the script. But he didn't want to write a script far away in Germany. I wanted to go to Diyarbakır after I completed my degree at the Berlin Film Academy and experience the situation myself, Inspired by the stories of the people he met there, he started to work with his aunt Evrim Alataş, journalist and short-story writer, to develop the scenario, which was scripted first in Turkish and then translated into Kurdish for filming.

Some in the audience ask if children face these situations in real life,, With some exceptions, all live under such circumstances; they grow up in an atmosphere of peak violence. Hakan Karsak, who features in the film, added, We, in Turkey, try to understand the children in Iraq, Iran, Afghanistan and Palestine, but we never consider the situation of the children living in the kurdish part of Turkey. Now it is time to look at life from the perspective of a kurdish child. In the end this is a film about violence, the history of violence here in Turkey, the director has concluded, I want people to understand that violence produces violence. This is a story of children who want to stop or at least escape this violence.

Miraz Bezar cast the actors himself. Şenay Orak and Muhammed Al were cast after the director met them on a bus trip to Urfa. Their highly acclaimed performances have been attributable to the fact that they are not only very talented child-actors but are also children who suffered experiences similar to the characters in the film.

Hakan Karsak, who plays one of the paramilitary murderers, was cast after the director had seen him on stage and was taken by his passion and talent while other adult performers including Fahriye Çelik, Alişan Önlü, Berivan Eminoğlu and Berivan Ayaz were also recruited locally. Suzan İlir was cast after trying to sell the director a bottle of water in one of the cemeteries in Diyarbakır. She at first did not want to tell me her name, but I finally convinced her that I was going to shoot a film and that I want her to help me.

In order to raise the initial budget of 80,000 euros for the film, Bezar’s mother sold her house and his uncle paid the team’s hotel expenses. Each time I felt like we were at the edge of the abyss some small thing would come and pull us back, a reminder of why it was so important to tell this story, the director has said. There are still team members who have not gotten paid. Most of them did it to support the film. Well-known German-Turkish director Fatih Akın later joined Klaus Maeck as co-producer after he was shown a rough cut of the film.

It was a real challenge to do this film because we never knew if it would make it through the censorship in Turkey, the director has stated, so much of the Turkish state has been built on lies; that there is only one people, only one language. I think that an opening is still too big of a word for what is happening," he has said, "but it's worth remembering that all the things that were taboo when we started writing and shooting the film are now beginning to be talked about. No matter what, I finally did what I wanted to do, this can be a small step in the right direction.

== Synopsis ==
The lives of 10-year-old Gülistan and her brother, Fırat, are turned upside down one quiet and dark night on the Diyarbakır-Batman highway while they’re on their way home with their parents from a wedding in a nearby village. Their father, a journalist working with a local newspaper, and their mother, who gave birth just six months ago to their baby sister, Dilovan, are murdered by paramilitary forces. The kids are taken care of by their aunt, the sister of their late mother. However, a few weeks on, their aunt goes missing, too. Left alone to look after their baby sister at such a young age, when they are not even capable of taking care of themselves, the kids are left penniless, and a few weeks later, they are forced to live on the streets of Diyarbakır, where they will have to fight really hard to survive.

== Release ==
The film received its controversial Turkish premiere at the 46th Antalya Golden Orange Film Festival, where some audience members protested that, There has never been a Kurdish state and there will never be one. To which the director responded, Cinema is a form of art. People do not have to agree with or believe in what they saw. The film was later awarded the grand jury prize.

Out of political reasons no Turkish distributor wanted to distribute the film. So director Miraz Bezar had to distribute the film himself. Nevertheless, the film opened in Turkey on April 2, 2010 on nine Theatres in Ankara, Van, Diyarbakır, Mersin and Urfa and found an audience of 24.000.

== Reception ==
=== Box office ===
The film twice reached number nineteen in the Turkish box office and has made a worldwide total gross of US$101,327.

=== Reviews ===
Andrew Finkel, writing about the film's premiere in Today's Zaman, states, there was a standing ovation for what promises to be the most controversial film of the festival, it is the first feature-length film of Miraz Bezar and one with heart and meaning. The film's young stars were themselves recruited from the bands of young marauding street vendors to whom the film is dedicated, and, he continues, Şenay Orak, who plays the sister, has a face as economical in expression as Robert Mitchum's and a more schooled performers ability to evince a world of emotion with a single blink. Like “Slumdog Millionaire,” the film is uplifting, but, he continues, Unlike “Slumdog,” the plot is not mawkishly sentimental and only a little bit contrived. Not everyone, of course, cheered, he concludes, “Min Dît” is not the sort of story that will comfort the prejudices of a Turkish audience nor is Kurdish a language they expect to hear. We must wait to see what sort of reception it gets.

Emrah Güler, writing in Hürriyet Daily News, describes the film as, the latest in a line of movies focusing on the Kurdish problem in Southeast Anatolia, which he believes indicates that, the Turkish government’s Kurdish initiative seems to be working for Turkish cinema. He warns, those who might find orphaned children on the streets too heavy for weekend entertainment, but recommends the film to, those interested in catching a glimpse of uncharted territory for Turkish cinema.

Emine Yıldırım, writing about the films screening at the Istanbul Film Festival in Today's Zaman, describes the film as, a worthy watch, which might be a personal story, but Turkey is no stranger to its premise; it is successful in bringing to light the plight of many children orphaned in Turkey's southeastern Anatolia region due to political conflicts. Make no mistake, the review continues, this is a tragic tale, but it comes out as truthful as it can and should be, despite Bezar's occasional inclination toward an idealist reductionism on political issues. The review concludes, Perhaps not a perfect film, though such should be accepted of a debut, “Min Dît” is a raw and genuine story. While Yavuz Baydar, in the same publication, calls it, one of the highlights of the festival.

=== Awards ===
- 57th San Sebastián International Film Festival - Gaztea Youth Award (Miraz Bezar)
- 46th Antalya Golden Orange Film Festival - Behlül Dal Special Jury Award for Screenwriting (Miraz Bezar)
- 18th Filmfest Hamburg - Young Talent Award (Miraz Bezar)
- 36th Ghent Film Festival - Special Jury Prize (Miraz Bezar)
- 15th Nuremberg Turkish-German Film Festival - Audience Award
- 17th Febiofest International Film Festival Prague - Grand Prix
- 29th International Istanbul Film Festival - Best Director Award (Miraz Bezar), Best Actress Award (Şenay Orak) & Best Music Award (Mustafa Biber)

== See also ==
- 2009 in film
- Turkish films of 2009
