= Özkök =

Özkök is a Turkish surname. Notable people with the surname include:

- Ertuğrul Özkök (born 1947), Turkish journalist
- Hilmi Özkök (born 1940), Turkish general
- İpek Özkök (born 1982), Turkish actress and model
