= Men on the Bridge =

- Theatrical poster
- Directed by: Aslı Özge
- Written by: Aslı Özge
- Produced by: Fabian Massah
- Starring: Fikret Portakal; Murat Tokgöz; Umut İlker
- Cinematography: Emre Erkmen
- Edited by: Aylin Zoi Tinel; Vessela Martschewski; Christof Schertenleib
- Release dates: April 15, 2009 (Istanbul International Film Festival); March 19, 2010 (Turkey)
- Running time: 87 minutes
- Country: Turkey
- Language: Turkish

Men on the Bridge (Turkish: Köprüdekiler) is a 2009 Turkish drama film directed by Aslı Özge. The film, which tells about the young generation who lives in the suburbs of Istanbul and come to the center of the city to make a living, follows a rose seller, a taxi driver and a traffic police officer whose lives unknowingly intersect every day on the Bosporus Bridge in Istanbul. It "wowed the audience in last year's Locarno and London Turkish film festivals, and won Best Film awards at last year's Istanbul International and Golden Cocoon film festivals", according to Emrah Güler, writing in Turkish Daily News.

== Production ==
The film, which is based on the real lives of three men, with Fikret Portakal and Umut İlker playing themselves, was originally intended to be a documentary film, but after an extensive research period in Istanbul starting in 2006, Özge along with director of photography Emre Erkmen got to know the main characters, who are working around the bridge, and decided to write a script based on the protagonists' own stories.

At certain times of the day I traveled many times from the European side of Istanbul to the Asian side crossing the Bosporus Bridge, where there is a continuous gridlock. Often while I was sitting in the car, I photographed the illegal street hawkers, who sell to the bored drivers bananas, pretzels, water, flowers.... I recognized that police, shared-taxi drivers and street hawkers are the ones, who are working directly at the bridge. It is a kind of microscopic view of Turkey through the social statuses of order-illegal-private. After a while I thought I am always passing them by, why don't I go home with them once. Then I began to get to know the real protagonists.

— Aslı Özge.

The production, which was funded by the Turkish Ministry of Culture, was not granted permission by the Turkish police authorities to feature a real police officer and so Murat Tokgöz, the brother of the real policeman upon whom the character is based, joined the production to play the part, with all other police roles are acted by professionals. Producer Fabian Massah and co-producer Sevil Demirci also joined the production at the beginning of shooting, which was done on location in Istanbul, Turkey.

In April 2008, during the development period, the film was entered into the Pitching du Réel at Visions du Réel Festival, and in November 2008 a rough cut was entered into the Rough Cut Pitching at the International Film Festival Amsterdam, co-producer Mete Gümürhan from Rotterdam-based Kaliber Film subsequently joined the production, which was completed in April 2009.

== Plot ==
Fikret (Fikret Portakal) earns a living by selling roses on the Bosporus Bridge. He also tries working in a restaurant, but it is not an improvement.

Umut (Umut İlker) is a dolmuş driver on the Taksim-Bostancı route. He and his girlfriend struggle to pay their apartment rent from their combined wages.

Murat (Murat Tokgöz) is traffic policeman on the Bosporus Bridge. He has dates with women he knows from chatting on internet. Some women are disappointed about his low wages.

The lives and dreams of these three men who live in the ghettos of the big city intersect unknowingly every day with each other's and those of millions of Istanbulites on the Bosporus Bridge, the heart of the city.

== Release ==
=== Premiere ===
The film had its world premiere on April 15, 2009 in competition at the 28th Istanbul International Film Festival where it was awarded the Golden Tulip Award for Best National Film. The film went on to win the Golden Boll Award for Best National Film at the 16th Altın Koza International Film Festival.

The film had its international premiere at the Locarno Film Festival, and went on to do a tour of the international film festival circuit, picking up additional awards at the London Turkish Film Festival and the 21st Ankara International Film Festival.

=== General Release ===
The film opened in 10 screens across Turkey on March 19, 2010 at number twenty-three in the Turkish box office chart with an opening weekend gross of $3,602.

== Reception ==
=== Reviews ===
Emrah Güler, writing in Turkish Daily News, states that the film contains "similar themes and characters" to the director's debut feature A Little Bit of April (Turkish: Ein bisschen April) but despite being "another movie based on migrant men and machismo", it "impressively blurs the lines between fiction and reality".

=== Awards ===
- 28th Istanbul International Film Festival - Golden Tulip Award for Best National Film
- 16th Altın Koza International Film Festival - Golden Boll Award for Best National Film
- 21st Ankara International Film Festival - Best National Feature Film Award

== See also ==
- 2009 in film
- Turkish films of 2009

Awards
Preceded by Sonbahar	Golden Boll Award for Best Picture; 2008	Succeeded by 11'e 10 Kala
