= İbrahim Selim =

Turkish actor (born 1979)

- Born: 5 October 1979 (age 46); Ankara, Turkey
- Occupations: Actor, TV presenter
- Years active: 2005–present
- Spouse: Ayşe Şeyma Keten (m. 2026)

İbrahim Selim (born 5 October 1979) is a Turkish stage, film, television and voice actor.

In 2016, for his solo performance of Bunu Ben de Yaparım he received the Most Successful Actor of the Year award at the 20th Afife Theatre Awards. Besides his acting, he is also known for his YouTube programs, podcasts and talk shows. He rose to prominence with his YouTube program STOLK.

== Life and career ==
İbrahim Selim was born in 1979 in Ankara. His family is of Laz descent from Arhavi. After finishing high school, he enrolled in the biology program of Hacettepe University but three years later started to study theatre at Hacettepe University Ankara State Conservatory. Between 2003 and 2004, he went on stage with the play The Gift of the Gorgon at the Ankara State Theatre. After graduating from conservatory he continued to live in Ankara for a while and landed small roles in some of TRT's TV series. He then moved to Istanbul, where he began stage and voice acting and appeared in commercials and TV series.

His solo performance of Bunu Ben de Yaparım at DOT Theatre in 2016 earned him the Most Successful Actor of the Year award at the 20th Afife Theatre Awards. In 2017, he shared the leading role with Zerrin Tekindor, Onur Saylak and Şebnem Bozoklu in an adaptation of Tennessee Williams's A Streetcar Named Desire which went on stage at the Beşiktaş Cultural Center. In the same year he went on stage at İş Sanat in Istanbul to perform in the children's theatre play Fantastik Hikayeler Makinesi. In 2019, he appeared as the King in a musical adaptation of Alice's Adventures in Wonderland titled Alice Müzikali.

Aside from his career on stage, Selim has appeared in a number of TV series, including Poyraz Karayel, Şahsiyet and Şubat. His cinematic credits include Kusursuzlar, Sis ve Gece and Rüya. His performance in Kusursuzlar earned him a nomination for the Best Actor award at the 41st Antalya Golden Orange Film Festival.

Selim has also presented YouTube programs, podcasts and talk shows. He became famous through his YouTube program STOLK.

== Filmography ==
Film
Year	Title	Role	Notes
2006	Sınav	Uğur	
2007	Sis ve Gece	Policeman	
2011	Canavarlar Sofrası	J	
2013	Kusursuzlar	Kerim	
2015	Yok Artık	Doctor	
2016	Rüya		
2017	İşe Yarar Bir Şey	İrfan	
2017	Çat Kapı Aşk	Psychologist	
2018	Ölümlü Dünya	Customer	
2018	Son Çıkış		
Television
Year	Title	Role	Notes
2005	Ne Seninle Ne Sensiz	Mustafa	
2007	Ters Yüz	Berk	
2007	Zoraki Koca	Taner	
2008	Vurgun		
2009	Aynadaki Düşman	Zeki	
2012	Çıplak Gerçek	Zihni	
2012–2013	Şubat		
2013	Fatih	Mercan Aga	Supporting role
2014	Ulan İstanbul	Eflatun	Supporting role
2015	Poyraz Karayel		Supporting role
2015	Güllerin Savaşı		Supporting role
2017	Hayati ve Diğerleri	Celal	Supporting role
Musical
Year	Title	Role	Notes
2019	Alice Müzikali	King	Supporting role
Web series
Year	Title	Role	Network
2011	Leyla ile Mecnun		
2018	Şahsiyet	Sefa	puhutv
2022	Uysallar	Mert	Netflix
2022	Erşan Kuneri	Melkan Orsay	Netflix
2022	Benimle Dünya Arasında	Cüneyt	Disney+
Presenter
Year	Title	Role	Network
2016	Stolk	Presenter	YouTube
2019–	İbrahim Selim ile Bu Gece	Presenter	Zorlu PSM / YouTube
2020–	Boom by İbrahim Selim	Presenter	BluTV
2023-	Kelime Oyunu	Presenter	Teve2

== Theatre ==
- Arzu Tramvayı (Mitch) - 2017
- Çirkin (director) - 2017
- Fantastik Hikayeler Makinesi - 2017
- Bunu Ben de Yaparım! (Dave) - 2016
- Tamamen Doluyuz (voiceover) - 2015
- Dövüş Gecesi - 2014
- Makas Oyunları 2 / Köy / Dalgety - 2014
- Makas Oyunları 1 / Şişman Adam / The Fat Man - 2013
- Sarı Ay (stepfather) - 2012
- Öksüzler (Danny) - 2011
- Malafa - 2010
- Alışveriş ve S***ş / Shopping and F***ing - 2009
- Vur / Yağmala / Yeniden / Odýsseia
