= Fabula (film) =

2025 crime comedy film

- International release poster
- Directed by: Michiel ten Horn
- Screenplay by: Michiel ten Horn
- Produced by: Sander Verdonk; Thomas den Drijver; Mariano Vanhoof; Jörg Siepmann; Harry Flöter
- Starring: Fedja van Huêt; Sezgin Güleç; Michiel Kerbosch; Anniek Pheifer; Livia Lamers; Georg Friedrich; David Kross
- Cinematography: Robbie van Brussel
- Edited by: Louis Deruddere
- Music by: Djurre de Haan
- Production companies: New Amsterdam Film Company; Fobic Films; 2Pilots
- Distributed by: The Searchers
- Release dates: January 30, 2025 (IFFR); April 10, 2025 (Netherlands)
- Running time: 125 minutes
- Countries: Netherlands; Germany; Belgium
- Languages: Dutch; English; German
- Box office: $129,276

Fabula is a 2025 absurdist crime comedy film written and directed by Michiel ten Horn, and starring Fedja van Huêt, Sezgin Güleç and Michiel Kerbosch. The film revolves around Jos, who was born into a family haunted by disaster and he determined to find out what caused it meets a series of colourful characters who slowly bring him closer to the explanation he’s been searching for. The Dutch, German and Belgium co-production also have Livia Lamers, Georg Friedrich and David Kross in pivotal roles.

The film premiered at the 54th International Film Festival Rotterdam as opening film on 30 January 2025.

== Synopsis ==
At 55, small-town criminal Jos finds himself utterly sidelined. His daughter shows him no respect, his wife lacks trust in him, and his friends mock him openly. While frantically trying to salvage a botched drug deal, Jos desperately seeks to understand who or what is causing his misfortune.

== Cast ==
- Fedja van Huêt as Jos
- Sezgin Güleç as Özgür
- Michiel Kerbosch as Lei
- Anniek Pheifer as Dien
- Livia Lamers as Linda
- Georg Friedrich as Hendrik
- David Kross as The Grape
- Izabela Gwizdak as Anja
- mark archschoot as paul

== Production ==
The film directed by Michiel ten Horn is produced by New Amsterdam Film Company, Fobic Films and 2Pilots, whereas international sales are handled by The Searchers.

The film was set in forbidding landscape of Limburg (Netherlands) and was shot in November and December, 2023. In the words of the director, "It was grey and rainy all the time, just as we wanted it, and it suited us we wanted it that way." He further explained, "It just had to feel uncomfortable all the time."

Principal photography began on 24 October 2023 on locations in Belgium, Germany - North Rhine-Westphalia, Netherlands. Filming ended on 13 December 2023 with filming locations in the regions of Belgium, North Rhine-Westphalia, and Netherlands.

== Release ==
Fabula had its world premiere on 30 January 2025, as part of the 54th International Film Festival Rotterdam, in Limelight as opening film.

It will be showcased in the official selection Out of competition at the Luxembourg City Film Festival on 8 March 2025.

== Reception ==
Wendy Ide reviewed the film at Rotterdam for ScreenDaily and criticized its pace, writing, "the film’s pacing drags". Ide opined that "Despite the best efforts of the assertively whimsical score, the dated and heavy-handed comedy fails to land". Stating her opinion she said , that the film is "An absurdist, meandering crime comedy" which drifts into fantasy and magical realism, ultimately becoming bogged down by its intricate storyline. Concluding review Ide deemed it "a misfire" and said, "And there’s a curious contradiction at the heart of the picture – the characters are cartoonish and grotesque, but the look of the film is, for the most part, grey-tinged and glumly realist."
