= Gölpınar, Akçadağ =

Village in Turkey

Gölpınar
- Neighbourhood
- Location in Turkey
- Coordinates: 38.303°N 38.033°E
- Country: Turkey
- Province: Malatya
- District: Akçadağ
- Population (2025): 446
- Time zone: UTC+3 (TRT)

Gölpınar is a neighbourhood in the municipality and district of Akçadağ, Malatya Province in Turkey. It is populated by Kurds of the Balan and Kurne tribes and had a population of 446 in 2025.

== Notable people ==
- Evrim Alataş
