= Wild Abandon =

2022 Turkish television series

- Turkish: Uysallar
- Written by: Hakan Günday
- Directed by: Onur Saylak
- Starring: Öner Erkan; Haluk Bilginer; Songül Öden
- Country of origin: Turkey
- Original language: Turkish
- No. of seasons: 1
- No. of episodes: 8

Production
- Running time: 44–62 minutes
- Production company: Ay Yapim

Original release
- Network: Netflix
- Release: 30 March 2022

Wild Abandon (Turkish: Uysallar) is a 2022 Turkish television series starring Öner Erkan, Haluk Bilginer and Songül Öden. The show was released on Netflix on 30 March 2022.

== Cast ==
- Öner Erkan as Oktay Uysal
- Haluk Bilginer as Berhudar
- Songül Öden as Nil Uysal
- Uğur Yücel as Olcay Uysal
- İbrahim Selim as Mert
- Nezaket Erden as Yağmur
- Serkan Altunorak as Suat Uysal
- Umut Yeşildağ as Ege Uysal
- Biljana Jovanovska as Sofia
- Nilay Yeral as Ece Uysal
- Durukan Ordu as Moloz
