= London Turkish Film Festival =

The London Turkish Film Festival is a film festival that takes place every year in London in the United Kingdom. It focuses on Turkish films.

== London Turkish Film Festival Director ==
Vedide Kaymak has been directing the London Turkish Film Festival since 1993. After graduating in Political Science and Journalism, Vedide worked in a variety of Turkish media organisations before moving to London, and a career in the cinema industry. Vedide initially worked with various arts and cultural organisations promoting Turkish culture in the UK, programming for MTV's Turkish channel and co-producing short films. However, it was her work at the Rio Cinema in East London and the subsequent creation of the London Turkish Film Festival that fulfilled her career ambition. With Vedide's leadership, the Festival has grown from a three-day event to an internationally renowned festival. For over a decade, she has also successfully promoted and distributed Turkish films to cinemas throughout the UK. In 2009 Vedide created another Turkish cinema milestone with the introduction of the annual Golden Wings Awards, including the unique Golden Wings Digiturk Digital Distribution Award'which ensures cinema distribution across the UK and Ireland for the winning film.

== Awards ==
=== 15th LTFF 2009 ===
Golden Wings Digital Distribution Award

Men on the Bridge (Köprüdekiler)
Director - Asli Ozge

The People's Choice Award

On the Way To School (İki Dil Bir Bavul)
Directors - Orhan Eskiköy, Özgür Doğan

Life Time Achievement Award

Türkan Şoray

=== 16th LTFF 2010 ===
Golden Wings Digital Distribution Award

Honey (Bal)
Director - Semih Kaplanoğlu

The People's Choice Award

Loose Cannons
Director - Ferzan Özpetek

Life Time Achievement Award

Şener Şen

=== 17th LTFF 2011 ===
Golden Wings Digital Distribution Award

Home (Yurt)
Director - Muzaffer Özdemir

The People's Choice Award

Shadows and Faces (Gölgeler ve Suretler)
Director - Derviş Zaim

Life Time Achievement Award

Hülya Koçyiğit

=== 18th LTFF 2013 ===
Golden Wings Digital Distribution Award

Night of Silence (Lal Gece)
Director - Reis Çelik

The People's Choice Award

The Butterfly's Dream (Kelebeğin Rüyası)
Director - Yılmaz Erdoğan

Life Time Achievement Award

Kadir İnanır

=== 19th LTFF 2014 ===
Golden Wings Digital Distribution Award

Cycle (Devir)
Director - Derviş Zaim

The People's Choice Award

Ayhan Hanim
Director - Levent Semerci

Life Time Achievement Award

Serra Yılmaz

== See also ==
- Istanbul International Film Festival
