= Evrim Alataş =

Kurdish journalist and screenwriter

- Born: April 15, 1976; Gölpınar, Akçadağ, Malatya, Turkey
- Died: April 12, 2010 (aged 33); Diyarbakır, Turkey
- Years active: 2003–2010

Evrim Alataş (born 15 April 1976; Gölpınar, Akçadağ – 12 April 2010; Diyarbakır) was a Kurdish writer, journalist, screenwriter and human rights activist. Alataş is described as the first female Kurdish writer of Turkey. Her works include the film Min Dît: The Children of Diyarbakır from 2009, which won the grand jury prize at the 46th Antalya Golden Orange Film Festival.

Born in the village of Gölpınar in Malatya in 1976 to a Kurdish family, Alataş started her journalism career in 1994 by working as a reporter and editor at various left-wing newspapers such as Yeni Politika, Özgür Bakış, Ülkede Özgür Gündem and later as a columnist for Evrensel and BirGün. Many of her writings for these newspapers were about Kurds in Turkey.

Alataş died in 2010 from cancer in her home in Diyarbakır and was buried in her home village of Gölpınar.

== Literature ==
- Mayoz bölünme hikayeleri (in Turkish). Aram. 2003. ISBN 9789758242665.
- Her dağın gölgesi deniz'e düşer (in Turkish) (2. ed.). İletişim. 2009. ISBN 9789750506963.

== See also ==
- Human rights in Turkey
