= Öner Erkan =

Turkish actor

- Born: 4 January 1980 (age 46); İzmir, Turkey
- Occupation: Actor
- Years active: 1995–present
- Spouse: Sibel Topkaya (m. 2010; div. 2012)

Öner Erkan (born 4 January 1980) is a Turkish actor.

== Biography ==
Öner Erkan was born on 4 January 1980 in İzmir, Turkey. He began acting at the age of 15 and graduated from Department of Theatre, Dokuz Eylül University. He received a master's degree in Bahçeşehir University. Between 2003 and 2004, he acted in various plays by İstanbul City Theatre.

He had guest role in hit sitcom Avrupa Yakası. He played later in popular family comedy series İki Aile as Ferit Pamukçuoğlu. He played in hit sitcom Yalan Dünya as Bora Alsancak from 2012 to 2014. He played two characters in comedy series Üsküdar'a Giderken. He played in period series "Deli Saraylı". He played in crime series Çukur as Selim Koçovalı from 2017 to 2020 recently.

He played in Netflix series "Uysallar", "Bir Başkadır".

He has also appeared in movies such as Organize İşler, Son Osmanlı Yandım Ali, Hırsız Var; and enacted leading roles in Kağıt and 7 Kocalı Hürmüz. In 2009, he won the Golden Orange prize for Best Leading Actor for his role in Bornova Bornova.

He also won the Afife Theater Awards for Best Actor Award for his roles in Babamın Cesetleri and Dünyada Karşılaşmış Gibi.

== Filmography ==
=== Web series ===
| Year | Title | Role | Notes |
|---|---|---|---|
| 2018 | Bartu Ben | Himself | Guest |
| 2020 | Bir Başkadır | Rezan | |
| 2021 | Kefe | Can | Podcast |
| 2022 | Uysallar | Oktay Uysal | |

=== TV series ===
| Year | Title | Role | Notes |
|---|---|---|---|
| 2002 | Kuzenlerim | Murat | |
| 2003 | Gelin | - | |
| 2004 | Metro Palas | Cengiz | |
| 2004 | Canım Benim | - | |
| 2005 | Aşk Her Yaşta | Ömer | |
| 2005 | Avrupa Yakası | Metehan | |
| 2006–2008 | İki Aile | Ferit Pamukçuoğlu | |
| 2009 | Kahve Bahane | Yılmaz | |
| 2010 | Deli Saraylı | Ayyar | |
| 2011 | Üsküdar'a Giderken | Erdem | |
| 2012–2014 | Yalan Dünya | Bora Alsancak | |
| 2015 | Mutlu Ol Yeter | Güneş | |
| 2015 | Analar ve Anneler | Emin | Guest |
| 2017–2021 | Çukur | Selim Koçovalı | Leading role |
| 2019 | Çarpışma | Selim Koçovalı | Guest |

=== Film ===
| Year | Title | Role | Notes |
|---|---|---|---|
| 2005 | Çanta | - | Short film |
| 2005 | Yolculuk | - | TV film |
| 2005 | Organize İşler | Silvio | |
| 2005 | Hacivat Karagöz Neden Öldürüldü? | Tulgar | |
| 2006 | Son Osmanlı Yandım Ali | Jerar | |
| 2008 | Made in Europe | Cem | |
| 2009 | Bornova Bornova | Hakan | |
| 2009 | 7 Kocalı Hürmüz | Hallaç Rüstem | |
| 2011 | Kağıt | Emrah | |
| 2013 | Mutlu Aile Defteri | İsmet E. | |
| 2014 | İtirazım Var | Gökhan Sevinç | |
| 2017 | Kırık Kalpler Bankası | Coşkun | |
| 2017 | Put Şeylere | - | |
| 2018 | Gerçek Kesit: Manyak | - | |
| 2018 | Martı | Rıza | |
| 2018 | Ahlat Ağacı | Nazmi | |
| 2020 | Sarı, Siyam, Kanocular ve Ev Sahibi | - | Short film |
| 2021 | Azizler | Alp | |
