= Nebil Özgentürk =

Turkish journalist and director (born 1959)

- Born: Nebil Özgentürk; 1959 (age 66–67); Adana, Turkey
- Education: İzmir Ege University Faculty of Management
- Occupations: Journalist, writer, documentary director
- Relatives: Ali Özgentürk (brother)
- Website: www.biryuduminsan.com.tr

Nebil Özgentürk (born 1959 in Adana) is a Turkish writer, journalist and director of documentaries.

Özgentürk, who is the brother of director Ali Özgentürk, graduated from the Ege Üniversitesi Faculty of Management in 1981. He started journalism as a correspondent for the Günaydın newspapers' İzmir office. Later he changed to the Sabah newspaper in Istanbul. He was a war correspondent in Romania, Abkhazia and the time of the Gulf War.

In 1992, he started to prepare short documentaries named "Bir İnsan Bir Hayat" which stemmed from the weekly portrait reports he did at the Sabah newspaper. This idea initiated from his book Bir Yudum İnsan. In later years he produced many documentaries. The program named Bir Yudum İnsan which he started in 1994 on ATV and later moved to CNN Türk covered the portraits of known names in art, sports and politics with an emphasis on the lesser known facts and aspects about their lives.

Özgentürk is married and has three children.

== Filmography ==
- Bir Doğum Günü Armağanı – 1998
- Bir Yudum İnsan – 1999–2007 (380 bölüm)
- Rüzgara Karşı Yürüyenler – 2002 (10 bölüm)
- Cumhuriyet Kuşağından 2000'lere Ses – 2002
- Türk Sinemasında İETT Serüveni: Yeşilçam'ın "Yol"culuğu... "Yol"culuğun Yeşilçam'ı – 2003
- Yaşamdan Dakikalar (With Hıncal Uluç, Haşmet Babaoğlu and Kenan Onuk) – 2004
- Konuşan Yeşilçam – 2004–2005 (30 episodes)
- Olimpiyatlar: Atina'dan Pekin'e Uzun İnce Bir Yol – 2006
- Orhan Pamuk: Anılar ve Nobel – 2007
- Basının Kısa Tarihi – 2007 (3 episodes)
- Türkiye’nin Hatıra Defteri – 2007 (14 episodes)
- Yargılardan Türkülere: Ankara Adliyesinin Yıllara Uzanan Öyküsü – 2009
- Anka Kuşu’nun İzinde (İstanbul Kız Lisesi’nin Asırlık Öyküsü) – 2010
- Sanatımızın Hatıra Defteri – 2013 (16 episodes)
- Venüs’ün Seyri (Sinemamızın ve Altın Portakal’ın 50 Yılı) – 2013
- Asırlık Yüzler – 2014 (6 episodes)
- Çağdaşlık İçin Çeyrek Asır – 2014
- Ataol’a Dair (Ataol Behramoğlu) – 2015
- Biz Kültür Yolcuları – 2015 (10 episodes)
- Ali Ekber Çiçek'in Öyküsü – 2015
- Osmanlı’dan Cumhuriyet’e At Sevdası – 2016
- Bir Kent Hikâyesi: Adana – 2016
- Toprak – 2016
- Bilimin Sonsuzluğunda Bir Yaşam: Aziz Sancar – 2016
- İçinden Hüzün Geçen Sevdalar – 2017
- Efsane Aslanlar – 2017 (13 episodes)
- Dersim’in Dersi-Kırık Bir Şehir Hikâyesi – 2017
- Bi'çaresizlikten Bi'çareye – 2017
- Almanya’ya Göçün Hatıra Defteri – 2017 (7 bölüm)
- Gazinin Son Tanıkları Anlatıyor
- Uzay Heparı
- Kenan Sofuoğlu
- Serhan Şeşen
- Zeki Ökten
- Ve Yaşamdan Dakikalar

== Corporate documentaries ==
- Bir Yudum Türkiye
- İlk Durak: İstanbul'un Entelektüel Tarihinden Tanıklıklar (with Can Dündar)
- Güleryüzlü Bir İzmir Şarkısı – 2005
- Olimpiyat: Atina'dan Pekin'e Uzun İnce Bir Yol – 2006
- Documentary of Istanbul University– 2006
- Bir Adana Masalı – 2007
- Cumhuriyet'in Kanatlarında Bir Girişimci: Asım Bey – 2010
- Sanayinin Sonsuz Işığında (Produced by the Istanbul Chamber of Industry) – 2017 (6 episodes)
- Balık Belgeseli
- Eczacıbaşı
- Istanbul Girls High School
- Markalar Şehri Bursa
- İzmir Fair Documentary
- YTONG'la Örülen Yıllar

== Works ==
- Türkiye'nin Hatıra Defteri 1924'ten Günümüze, DenizBank Publications, 2009
- Babayani, Kara Karga Publishers, 2017
- Daima Işık, Kara Karga Publishers, 2018
- Sessiz Gece Yazıları, Kara Karga Publishers, 2018
- Galatasaray Tarihi ve Efsaneleri, Doğan Kitap, 2018
- Masumiyet Çağı İnsanları: Cumhuriyet Yıllarından Özel Hatıralar, Bir Yudum İnsan Publishing House, 2019
- Filmlerle Geçtim Sokağınızdan, Kara Karga Publishers, 2020

== Major awards ==
- Türkiye Gazetecilik Başarı Ödülü Onur Belgesi- Journalist of the Year in the Report Branch 1994
- Türkiye Gazetecilik Cemiyeti Türkiye Gazetecilik Başarı Ödülleri "TV-Kültür-Sanat-Magazin" 2005
- Contemporary Journalists Association Mahmut Tali Öngören Award 2008
- 38. Golden Butterfly Award for Best Contemporary Culture and Art Program for "Yaşamdan Dakikalar"
- Sedat Simavi Award for "Sanatımızın Hatıra Defteri" 2013
