= The Pain (film) =

- Theatrical poster
- Directed by: Cemal Şan
- Written by: Cemal Şan
- Produced by: Cemal Şan
- Starring: Nesrin Cavadzade; Erol Demiröz; Osman Şenel
- Cinematography: Cengiz Uzun
- Edited by: Şenol Şentürk
- Music by: Nail Yurtsever; Cem Tuncer; Engin Arslan
- Production company: San Film
- Distributed by: Cinegroup
- Release date: October 9, 2009
- Running time: 104 minutes
- Country: Turkey
- Language: Turkish
- Box office: $27,488

The Pain (Turkish: Acı) is a 2009 Turkish drama film written, produced and directed by Cemal Şan, which looks at generation gaps through the story of an old man and his granddaughter. The film, which went on nationwide general release across Turkey on October 9, 2009, has been screened at numerous international film festivals. It is dedicated to Engin Çeber who died while he was in custody.

== Plot ==
Nesrin is a young girl fighting for freedom, while the grandfather Hıdır defends the family values. Through the story of Hıdır and Nesrin, the film brings forward the issues of identity, toleration, leniency, cultural differences and ethics. “Pain” is a universal story on the necessity of saying “no!” for a humanely life.

== Release ==
=== General release ===
The film opened in 25 screens across Turkey on October 9, 2009 at number twenty-eight in the Turkish box office chart with an opening weekend gross of $3,067.

=== Festival screenings ===
- 2009
  - Dadaş Film Festival
  - 4th Bursa International Silk Road Film Festival
  - 3rd STEPS International Rights Film Festival
- 2010
  - 28th International Fajr Film Festival
  - 21st Ankara International Film Festival

== Reception ==
=== Box Office ===
The film reached number twenty-seven in the Turkish box office chart and has made a total gross of $27,488.

=== Awards ===
- 2009 Dadaş Film Festival
  - Best Film (Won)
  - Best Director: Cemal Şan (Won)
  - Best Actress (Won)
- 3rd STEPS International Rights Film Festival
  - Best Screenplay: Cemal Şan (Won)
  - Best Music: Nail Yurtsever, Cem Tuncer & Engin Arslan (Won)
- 28th International Fajr Film Festival
  - Firuze Award (Won)

== See also ==
- 2009 in film
- Turkish films of 2009
