= Fiume o morte! =

2025 film by Igor Bezinović

- Festival poster
- Directed by: Igor Bezinović
- Written by: Igor Bezinović
- Produced by: Vanja Jambrović; Tibor Keser
- Cinematography: Gregor Božič
- Edited by: Hrvoslava Brkušić
- Music by: Giovanni Maier; Hrvoje Nikšić
- Production companies: Restart; Videomante; Nosorogi; Croatian Radiotelevision
- Release dates: 2 February 2025 (Rotterdam); 8 February 2025 (Croatia)
- Running time: 113 minutes
- Countries: Croatia; Italy; Slovenia
- Languages: Fiuman; Croatian; Italian

Fiume o morte! (Italian for 'Rijeka or death!') is a 2025 comedy docudrama film written and directed by Igor Bezinović. A co-production of Croatia, Italy and Slovenia, it features reenactments and reconstructions of Gabriele D'Annunzio's occupation of Rijeka.

It premiered at the 54th International Film Festival Rotterdam, where it won the Tiger Award. At the 72nd Pula Film Festival, the film won six Golden Arenas, including Best Director for Bezinović. At the 38th European Film Awards, it won Best Documentary. It was selected as the Croatian entry for Best International Feature Film at the 98th Academy Awards, but was not nominated.

== Plot ==
In present-day Rijeka, director Igor Bezinović asks local residents what they know about Gabriele D'Annunzio, the Italian poet and nationalist who occupied the city, then known as Fiume, after the First World War. Their responses introduce an account of D'Annunzio's presence in the city and its place in local memory.

The film reconstructs the occupation through archival photographs and footage, narration, documentary sequences, and staged reenactments performed largely by residents of Rijeka. Several participants portray D'Annunzio, while others take the roles of soldiers and people connected with the events. The film also shows auditions, rehearsals, preparations, and discussions about the historical material used to stage the reenactments.

The narrative follows D'Annunzio's arrival in Fiume in September 1919 and his campaign to annex the disputed city to Italy. Using contemporary locations and archival material, the film recreates speeches, military gatherings, ceremonies, and other episodes from the occupation. It also addresses the establishment of the Italian Regency of Carnaro and the conflict between D'Annunzio and the Italian government.

The occupation ends with the confrontation between D'Annunzio’s forces and the Italian military in December 1920. The film then returns to present-day Rijeka and to the residents who participated in the reenactments, connecting the historical events with contemporary recollections of the city’s past.

== Cast ==
- Actors portraying Gabriele D'Annunzio:
  - Ćenan Beljulji
  - Tihomir Buterin
  - Andrea Marsanich (also a narrator)
  - Izet Medošević
  - Massimo Ronzani
  - Milovan Večerina Cico
  - Albano Vučetić
- Lovro Mirth as Guido Keller and a narrator
- Tonka Mršić as Luisa Baccara
- Renzo Chiepolo as Vittorio Emanuele Pittaluga and a narrator
- Goran Pavlić as Antonio Grossich
- Nikola Tutek as Guglielmo Marconi

== Production ==
Director Igor Bezinović grew up in Rijeka. Regarding his approach for the film, he stated, "It's like a history lesson but retold in a fun way. In high school, I didn't like history that much because I didn't have a good storyteller, and history is basically about the art of telling a story. You can combine storytelling with facts, and it doesn't have to be terribly boring. It can be fun." Bezinović has said he was struck by how differently D'Annunzio is remembered depending on who is telling the story: in Rijeka's Italian-language schools he is studied as a literary figure, while in the city's Croatian-language schools, attended by the majority of residents, he is not taught at all.

Bezinović began researching D'Annunzio and developing the film in 2015 after securing development funding, and started filming test material in 2018. An open call inviting Rijeka residents to take part was published in local media in 2020, and principal photography began in earnest in 2021 with the large pool of participants the production had already assembled. During casting, Bezinović approached middle-aged men who, like D'Annunzio, happened to be bald, and asked whether they would be willing to portray him, and gave particular attention to residents who still spoke Fiuman, the Venetian-derived dialect once prevalent in the city but now spoken by few, weaving their voice-over narration into the film's soundtrack.

Principal photography was completed by mid-July 2022. The film was shot in Rijeka and Trieste, as well as at the Vittoriale degli Italiani in Gardone Riviera and in the Italian part of the Karst Plateau.

== Release ==
The film premiered at the 54th International Film Festival Rotterdam on 2 February 2025, where it won both the Tiger Award and FIPRESCI Award. The film opened theatrically in Croatia on 8 February 2025, and in Italy it opened on 24–26 February 2025 in a release organised in collaboration with the Pordenone Docs Fest, preceded by preview screenings in Venice, Trieste, Udine and Pordenone. By the beginning of July 2025, it had attracted 27,052 viewers in Croatian cinemas, making it the most-watched documentary film since Croatia's independence in 1991, surpassing earlier record-holders such as Novo, novo vrijeme and Sretno dijete. By mid-January 2026, its cumulative Croatian cinema audience had grown to 38,948, surpassing Fahrenheit 9/11 (34,389 admissions) to become the best-attended documentary in Croatian cinemas since independence.

== Reception ==
=== Critical response ===
On the review aggregator website Rotten Tomatoes, the film holds an approval rating of 94% based on 17 reviews, with an average rating of 8.2/10.

Wendy Ide of Screen Daily called the film "forthright, unflinching and very funny" and "a gloriously punk spin on the historical documentary genre". Guy Lodge of Variety called the film "both compelling and very amusing". Writing in The New Yorker on the occasion of the film's American premiere at New Directors/New Films, Richard Brody said Bezinović "confronts [the problem of dramatizing distant history] boldly and brilliantly", and that its re-creations, "however derisive, are chilling".

=== Accolades ===
Award	Year (Note: Indicates the year of ceremony. Each year is linked to the article about the awards held that year, wherever possible.)	Category	Recipient(s)	Result	Ref.
International Film Festival Rotterdam	2025	Tiger Award	Fiume o morte!	Won	
International Film Festival Rotterdam	2025	FIPRESCI Award	Fiume o morte!	Won	
Pula Film Festival	2025	Best Makeup	Ivana Pralija	Won	
Pula Film Festival	2025	Best Costume Design	Tajči Čekada and Manuela Paladin	Won	
Pula Film Festival	2025	Best Production Design	Anton Spazzapan	Won	
Pula Film Festival	2025	Best Casting	Sara Jakupec	Won	
Pula Film Festival	2025	Best Production	Vanja Jambrović and Tibor Keser	Won	
Pula Film Festival	2025	Best Director	Igor Bezinović	Won	
Yerevan International Film Festival	2025	Golden Apricot	Fiume o morte!	Won	
Vukovar Film Festival	2025	Golden Barge	Fiume o morte!	Won	
CinEast Film Festival	2025	Audience Award	Fiume o morte!	Won	
Adriatic Film & TV Awards	2025	Best Film	Fiume o morte!	Won	
Adriatic Film & TV Awards	2025	Best Director	Igor Bezinović	Won	
Adriatic Film & TV Awards	2025	Best Screenplay	Igor Bezinović	Won	
European Film Awards	2026	Best Film	Fiume o morte!	Nominated	
European Film Awards	2026	Best Documentary	Fiume o morte!	Won	
Millennium Docs Against Gravity	2026	FIPRESCI Documentary Grand Prix	Fiume o morte!	Won	

== See also ==
- Fiume question
- List of submissions to the 98th Academy Awards for Best International Feature Film
- List of Croatian submissions for the Academy Award for Best International Feature Film
