= Damla Sönmez =

Turkish actress (born 1987)

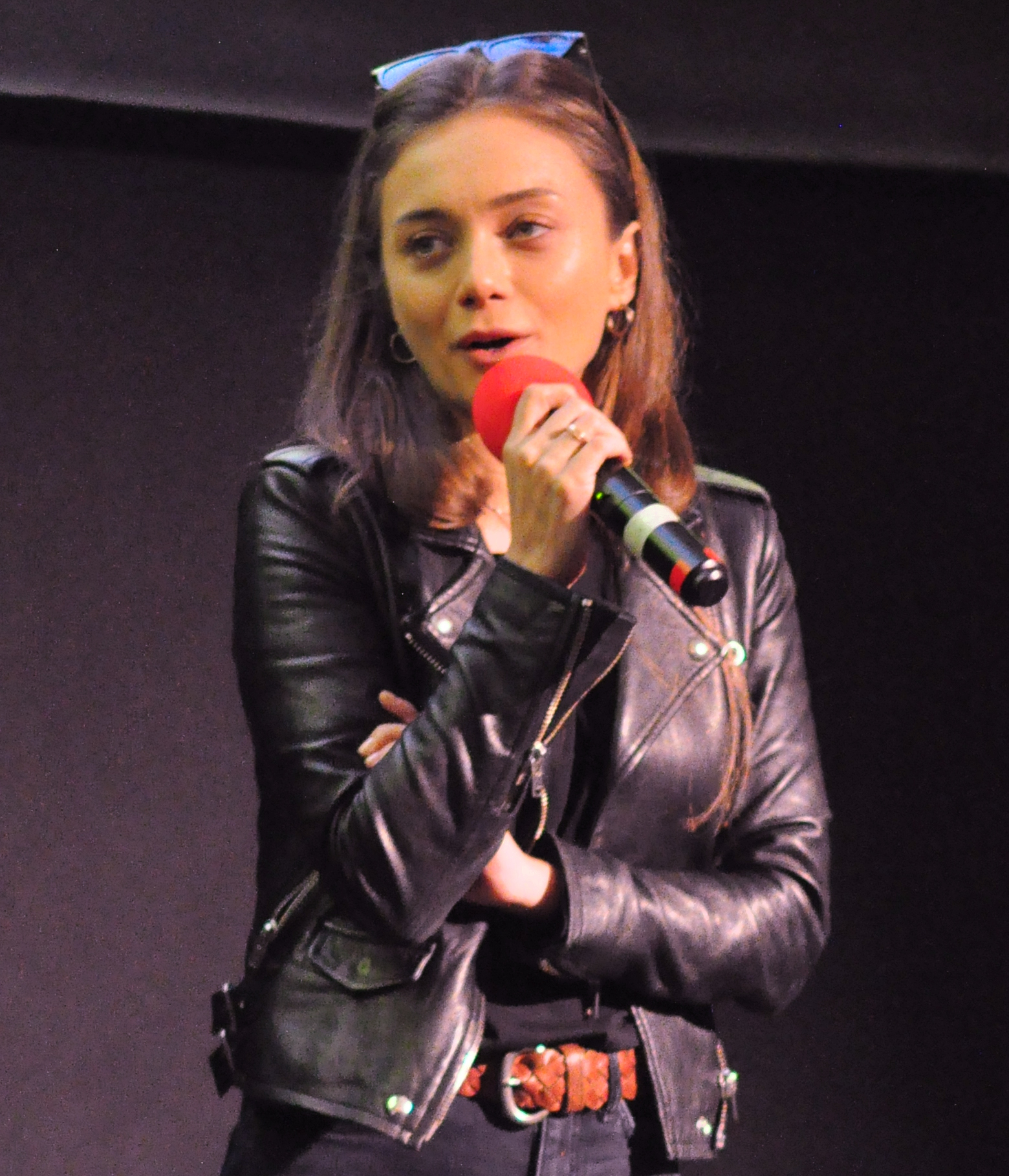
- Sönmez in 2019
- Born: Tilya Damla Sönmez; 3 May 1987 (age 38); Istanbul, Turkey
- Citizenship: Turkish
- Education: St. Joseph High School; Mimar Sinan University State Conservatory; Paris Sorbonne University; Yeditepe University; London School of Dramatic Art
- Occupation: Actress
- Years active: 2004–present
- Website: www.damlasonmez.com.tr

Tilya Damla Sönmez (born 3 May 1987) is a Turkish actress and voiceover artist. She gained worldwide recognition for her movies Sibel and I Am You. Her prominent TV roles include Ceylan in Bir Aşk Hikayesi, Gülru in Güllerin Savaşı, and Efsun in Çukur.

== Early life and education ==
Damla Sönmez is an only child. Her maternal family is Abkhazian immigrants. Her paternal grandparent is of Circassian descent who immigrated to Diyarbakır from Syria. Her father is an engineer and programmer, and her mother works as an architect. Her biggest passion as a child was theater and cinema. She began to study at theater studios early on. During school years, Damla constantly played on stage, and began to appear in commercials on television. In those years she was promised a great future already.

After graduating from Saint Joseph French High School in Istanbul, she was accepted to Université de La Sorbonne Nouvelle Paris in the Theatre department. She studied for a year in Paris before being awarded a scholarship to the Yeditepe University Fine Arts Theatre Department in Istanbul. Sönmez also studied semi-timed 2 years violin and 1 year piano in Mimar Sinan University State Conservatory. She had later attended Jillian O’Dowd's Contemporary Acting Workshop at the London Dramatic School of Art and worked with Stuart Burney at the Black Nexxus Academy in New York.

== Career ==
=== Films ===
In 2009, she starred in Bornova Bornova and won the "Best Supporting Actress" at the 46th Golden Orange Film Festival, alongside other awards at the Sadri Alışık Awards and the Flying Broom International Women's Film Festival. She became the Young President of the festival at the 18th Broom Broom Women Films Festival in 2015 and she won the 21st Golden Boll Film Festival and the Best Actress Award at the Milano International Film Festival (MIFF) for her role in the film "Sea Level (Deniz Seviyesi)". She starred in film Sibel about Turkish bird language and released many international festivals. She won "Sadri Alışık Best Actress Award". With Ali Atay, she played in the surreal art house film Sen Aydınlatırsın Geceyi which was released at the Toronto International Film Festival and period film Ayla which was selected as the Turkish entry for the Best Foreign Language Film at the 90th Academy Awards.

=== Television series ===
In her television career, she played supporting roles in hit series Emret Komutanım, Gece Gündüz, and Türkan. A turning point in her television career was when she was cast as a bride who suffers from loss of memory in the series Şubat. Her first leading role was Bir Aşk Hikayesi, an adaptation of I'm Sorry, I Love You, where she played the role of Ceylan alongside actor Seçkin Özdemir.

In 2014, she starred in the TV series Güllerin Savaşı as Gülru alongside Canan Ergüder. In 2019, she joined season 3 of Çukur portraying Efsun Kent, a character that gained a lot of media attention. Sönmez sang many classic Turkish arabesque songs as part of her role in Çukur including "Durdurun Dünyayı", "Su Ver Leyla", "Sen Affetsen Ben Affetmem", "Sorma", and "Son Mektup". In 2021, it was announced that she will star in the TV series Aziz as Dilruba alongside actor Murat Yıldırım.

=== Web series ===
In 2017, she played the main role in an episode of BluTV's anthology series 7 Yüz (7 Faces). In 2020, she portrayed Ana in Netflix's historical docudrama Rise of Empires: Ottoman. In 2021, she joined season 2 of BluTV's hit series Saygı (Respect) as Arya Şahin, a public prosecutor.

== Filmography ==
Cinema
Year	Title	Role
2009	Kampüste Çıplak Ayaklar	Ebru
2009	Bornova Bornova	Özlem
2010	Çakal	Deniz
2010	Mahpeyker: Kösem Sultan	Kösem Sultan
2012	Kurtuluş Son Durak	Tülay
2012	Uzun Hikâye	Ayla
2013	Sen Aydınlatırsın Geceyi	Defne
2014	Deniz Seviyesi	Damla
2017	Taksim Hold'em	Defne
2017	Ayla: The Daughter of War	Nuran
2018	Sibel	Sibel
2019	I Am You	Aisha
2024	Tezgah	
2024	Seni Bıraktığım Yerdeyim	Nihan
Web series
Year	Title	Role
2017	7 Yüz	Pınar
2019	Rise of Empires: Ottoman	Ana
2021	Saygı	Arya Şahin
TBA	Çırak	Hacker
Television
Year	Title	Role
2004	Camdan Pabuçlar	Gülçin
2004	Omuz Omuza	Pelin
2005	Kapıları Açmak	Gülşen
2006	Pertev Bey'in Üç Kızı	Nermin
2006	Şarkılar Susmasın	Aycan
2006	Sahte Prenses	Sedef
2006–2007	Fırtınalı Aşk	Melda Talay
2008	Emret Komutanım	Karamel
2008–2009	Gece Gündüz	Pınar
2010–2011	Türkan	Turhan
2012	Şubat	Gelin
2013–2014	Bir Aşk Hikâyesi (A Love Story)	Ceylan German
2014–2016	Güllerin Savaşı	Gülru Çelik Sipahi
2017	Aşk ve Gurur	Zeynep
2018	Masum Değiliz	Selin
2019–2021	Çukur	Efsun
2021–2022	Aziz	Dilruba
2023	Maviye Sürgün	Defne Boz
2024	Kötü Kan	Nazan Kaya
Short film
Year	Title	Role
2008	The Irony Series 1: Hope	Damla
2011	Alala	Kardeş (sister)
2011	Korkuluk	Kadın (woman)
2019	The Cut	Journalist
2020	Don't Get Me Wrong But	Günseli
2020	The Second Night	Leyla
Advertisement
Year	Title	Notes
2004	Orkid	
2016	LCW - Geri Sayım Başladı	dubbing
2017	Becel - Kalbini Sev	dubbing
2017	Dogadan	voiceover
2017	Modacruz	voiceover
2017	Vestel	voiceover
2019	Bosch	voiceover
2020	L'Oréal	
2021	Biscolata	voiceover

== Theater ==
Year	Title	Writer	Director	Role	Notes
2008	Sürmanşet	Sinan Tuzcu	Arif Akkaya		Director Assistant
2009	Alışveriş ve S***ş / Shopping and F***ing	Mark Ravenhill	Murat Daltaban		Project Design / Dramaturg
2012	Yalnız Batı	Martin McDonagh	Serkan Üstüner	Girleen	
2014	Savaş	Lars Noren	Serdar Biliş	Benina	
2016	Parçacıklar	Nick Payne	Tamer Can Erkan	Marianne	
2017	Bi Parça Plastik	Marius von Mayenburg	Sündüz Haşar		Project Coordinator
2021	Hamlet	William Shakespeare	İbrahim Çiçek	Ophelia	Digital theater

== Awards and nominations ==
Year	Awards	Category	Works	Result
2009	Antalya Golden Orange Film Festival	Best Supporting Actress	Bornova Bornova	Won
2010	Ankara Flying Broom International Women's Film Festival Young Witch Award	Best Actress	Bornova Bornova	Won
2014	Adana Film Festival Golden Boll in National Feature Film	Best Actress	Deniz Seviyesi	Won
2018	Adana Film Festival Golden Boll in National Feature Film	Best Actress	Sibel	Won
2018	Kayseri Film Festival	Best Actress	Taksim Hold'em	Won
2018	London Film Week	Best Acting	Sibel	Won
2015	Milano International Film Festival Awards (MIFF Awards) Leonardo's Horse	Best Actress	Deniz Seviyesi	Won
2018	Asia Pacific Screen Awards	Best Performance by an Actress	Sibel	Nominated
2020	Florence Film Awards	Best Actress	I Am You	Won
2018	Kayseri Film Festival Golden Sycamore	Best Actress	Taksim Hold'em	Won
2010	Sadri Alisik Theatre and Cinema Awards	Promising Actor Award	Bornova Bornova	Won
2019	Sadri Alisik Theatre and Cinema Awards	Best Performance by an Actress in a Motion Picture - Drama	Sibel	Won
2019	Seattle International Film Festival Golden Space Needle Award	Best Actress	Sibel	Won
2019	Turkish Film Critics Association (SIYAD) Awards	Best Actress	Sibel	Won
2013	Turkish Film Critics Association (SIYAD) Awards	Best Supporting Actress	Sen Aydinlatirsin Geceyi	Nominated
2009	Turkish Film Critics Association (SIYAD) Awards	Best Supporting Actress	Bornova Bornova	Nominated
2009	Yesilçam Award	Best Young Talent	Bornova Bornova	Nominated
2010	Yesilçam Award	Best Young Talent	Mahpeyker - Kösem Sultan	Nominated
2014	Yeni Tiyatro Dergisi Emek ve Başarı Awards	Most Successful Actress of the Year in a Supporting Role	Savaş	Won
2018	Ulusal Yarışma	Best Actress	Sibel	Won
2018	6th Muret Film Festival (France)	Best Actress	Sibel	Won
2018	Eskisehir International Film Festival	Best Performance of the Year	Sibel	Won
2019	Mef Schools - Changemakers Award	Changemaker		Won
2019	Frankfurt Turkish Film Festival	Best Actress	Sibel	Won
2018	Afife Theater Awards	Best Supporting Actress of the Year	Bi Parça Plastik	Nominated
