= The Ringing Ball =

- Theatrical poster
- Directed by: Mahir Egemen Ertürk
- Written by: Mahir Egemen Ertürk
- Produced by: Pelin Ertürk; Mahir Egemen Ertürk
- Starring: Burak Önal; İpek Özkök; Zihni Göktay
- Cinematography: Ulaş Zeybek
- Edited by: Mustafa Preşeva
- Music by: Ilker Yurtcan
- Release date: September 18, 2009
- Country: Turkey
- Language: Turkish
- Box office: $67,352

The Ringing Ball (Turkish: Çıngıraklı Top) is a 2009 Turkish comedy film written and directed by Mahir Egemen Ertürk, about a team of blind football players who want to attend the 2004 Summer Paralympics in Athens. The film, which went on nationwide general release across Turkey on September 18, 2009, has been screened at film festivals in Ankara and Salonika.

== Production ==
The film was shot on location in Istanbul, Turkey.

== Plot ==
The film follows a handful of blind people, including a fisherman, a call-center agent and a man who sells lottery tickets on the street, from the Bosporus Society for the Blind, training to compete in the soccer category at the Paralympics. Kerem (Burak Önal), a former soccer star who has become an alcoholic coaches the team and falls in love with the beautiful Semra (İpek Özkök), a young woman works for the society. Unfortunately, Kerem has some thugs on his tail due to his past debts and his weakness for wine puts his coaching activities in danger.

== Release ==
=== General release ===
The film opened in 45 screens across Turkey on September 18, 2009 at number sixteen in the Turkish box office chart with an opening weekend gross of $12,819.

=== Festival screenings ===
- 21st Ankara International Film Festival
- 50th Selanik International Film Festival

== Reception ==
=== Box Office ===
The film has made a total gross of $67,352.

=== Reviews ===
Emine Yıldrım, writing in Today's Zaman, describes the film as, "a borderline emotion exploiter that performs quite pleasantly despite some of its excesses until that point at the very end in which the filmmakers transform their cute story into a slice of unnecessary arabesque." "The film", he continues, "has a lot of funny and sweet moments thanks to the enthusiasm of the actors who are playing the blind team members, and director Ertürk should be congratulated for portraying them with respect instead of pity", and, "I was smiling with amusement as I was watching this quasi-sports comedy until I was subjected to the bombardment of sentiment in the movie's final 10 minutes, thus I regret to say that I couldn't help ending up cowered with a sour expression on my face. They had taken away my feel-good moment, and I don't even know for what purpose." He concludes that the film, "has the potential to reach the hearts of enough audience members; it tries to illustrate a positive message - anyone can do anything. It's just that no one wants to watch an alcoholic overcome with self-pity if they're in the mood for regaining hope."

== See also ==
- 2009 in film
- Turkish films of 2009
