= And the Rest Will Follow (film) =

And The Rest Will Follow
- Turkish: O da Bir Şey mi
- Directed by: Pelin Esmer
- Written by: Pelin Esmer
- Produced by: Kerem Çatay; Pelin Esmer; Dilde Mahalli
- Starring: Timuçin Esen; Merve Asya Özgür; İpek Bilgin; Nur Sürer; Mehmet Kurtuluş; Şebnem Hassanisoughi; Asiye Dinçsoy
- Cinematography: Barbu Balasoiu
- Edited by: Özcan Vardar
- Release dates: February 1, 2025 (Rotterdam); April 19, 2025 (İstanbul)
- Running time: 114 min.
- Countries: Turkey; Bulgaria; Romania
- Language: Turkish

And The Rest Will Follow (Turkish: O da Bir Şey mi) is a 2025 Turkish, Bulgarian, and Romanian co-produced drama film, directed and written by Pelin Esmer. Starring Timuçin Esen, Merve Asya Özgür, İpek Bilgin, and Nur Sürer, the film focuses on the story of director Levent (Timuçin Esen), who has been invited to the Söke Film Festival, and Aliye (Merve Asya Özgür), a housekeeping staff member at the hotel where he is staying. The film had its world premiere on February 1, 2025, at the 54th International Film Festival Rotterdam.

== Cast ==
- Timuçin Esen as Levent
- Merve Asya Özgür - as Aliye
- İpek Bilgin as Nigâr
- Nur Sürer as Gülistan
- Mehmet Kurtuluş as Lawyer Ahmet Sönmez
- Şebnem Hassanisoughi as Aynur
- Asiye Dinçsoy as Emine
