= Erol Demiröz =

Turkish actor (1940–2021)

- Born: 1 January 1940; Diyarbakır, Turkey
- Died: 17 April 2021 (aged 81); Ankara, Turkey
- Occupation: Actor
- Years active: 1979–2021

Erol Demiröz (1 January 1940 – 17 April 2021) was a Turkish actor. He appeared in more than twenty films.

Demiröz died in 2021 from COVID-19.

== Selected filmography ==
Year	Title	Role	Notes
1979	The Herd		
1983	A Season in Hakkari		
2007	The White Angel		
2009	The Pain		
1987	Çark	Alamanci Recep	
1998	Avci	Dede	
2005	Balans ve manevra	Nihat	
2006	Çinliler Geliyor	Haci	
2008	Son cellat	Cellat Basi	
