= Cemal Toktaş =

Turkish actor

- Born: 14 January 1983 (age 43); Istanbul, Turkey
- Occupation: Actor
- Years active: 2003–present
- Spouse: Nergis Öztürk (m. 2014)
- Children: 1

Cemal Toktaş (born 14 January 1983) is a Turkish actor. He is a graduate of Istanbul University State Conservatory. Toktaş started his career in 2003 by appearing in the TV film Evlat. He made his cinematic debut with the movie Kara Köpekler Havlarken. Toktaş was also cast in Mahsun Kırmızıgül's Güneşi Gördüm, in which he portrayed the character of Kadri. For his role in this movie, he received the Sadri Alışık Award for Best Supporting Award.

== Filmography ==
Year	Film	Role	Notes
2003	Evlat	Barış	TV film
2004	24 Saat		TV series
2004	Şeytan Ayrıntıda Gizlidir	Mümtaz	TV series
2006–2007	Sıla	Azad	TV series
2009	Kara Köpekler Havlarken	Selim	
2009	Güneşi Gördüm	Kadri	
2009	Adını Sen Koy	Ilgaz	Film
2010	Doktorlar	Ozan Ertürk	TV series
2011	Tövbeler Tövbesi	Mahir	TV series
2012–2014	Böyle Bitmesin	Yusuf	TV series
2014–2015	Yılanların Öcü	Kara Bayram	TV series
2014	Köpek	Murat	Film
2017–2018	Meryem	Oktay Şahin	TV series
2018	Bizim Hikaye	Ömer Duraner	TV series
2019	Vurgun	Turan Vardar	TV series
2020	Uyanış: Büyük Selçuklu	Al-Ghazali	TV series
2020	Kar Kırmızı		Film
2021	Yalancı	Murat Özdal	TV series
2022	Garip Bülbül Neşet Ertaş	Burhan Bayar	Film
2022–	Yürek Çıkmazı	Kıvanç	TV series
