= Bornova Bornova =

- Theatrical Poster
- Directed by: İnan Temelkuran
- Written by: İnan Temelkuran
- Produced by: İnan Temelkuran
- Starring: Öner Erkan; Damla Sönmez; Nazlı Gonca Vuslateri; Selen Uçer; Erkan Bektaş; Kadir Çermik
- Cinematography: Enrique Santiago Silguero
- Edited by: Erkan Tekemen
- Music by: Harun Iyicil; Ferit Özgüner
- Distributed by: Tiglon, Filmpot
- Release date: 13 November 2009
- Running time: 92 minutes
- Country: Turkey
- Language: Turkish

Bornova Bornova is a 2009 Turkish drama film, written, produced and directed by İnan Temelkuran, depicting a day in the lives of three young men from the same neighborhood in İzmir's Bornova district. The film, which went on nationwide general release across Turkey on November 13, 2009, won several awards, including the Golden Orange and Turkish Film Critics Association awards for Best Film, at the 46th Antalya "Golden Orange" International Film Festival.

== Plot ==
One day in the lives of three young men from the same neighborhood in İzmir's Bornova district. Hakan (Öner Erkan) is a young man who spends his entire day in front of the neighborhood's grocery shop with Salih (Kadir Çermik), thinking, “If we were just given the chance…” Salih, the neighborhood's psychopathic rogue, is like an older brother to Hakan, who has just returned home after completing his mandatory military service. Hakan does not have a job, but he plans to become a taxi driver to be able to realize all he wants in this life: to earn just enough money to be able to decently look after a small family and to marry the girl he secretly adores. Salih is the only person who listens to Hakan and gives him advice. Although Salih has grown up in a respectable, educated family, he's involved in every kind of illegal business in the neighborhood. Everybody in the neighborhood is scared of him, including high school student Özlem (Damla Sönmez). Hakan is crazy about Özlem, but he never had the courage to talk to her in person. In the meantime, Murat (Erkan Bektaş), Salih's childhood friend and a doctoral student in philosophy, makes a living through writing erotic fantasies. He tells Hakan about an erotic fantasy that he wrote based on an event involving Salih and Özlem. Disappointed and confused, Hakan heads toward Özlem's house to learn about the whole thing.

== See also ==
- 2009 in film
- Turkish films of 2009
