= Sibel (film) =

2018 film

- Film poster
- Directed by: Çagla Zencirci; Guillaume Giovanetti
- Written by: Çagla Zencirci; Guillaume Giovanetti; Ramata-Toulaye Sy
- Produced by: Marie Legrand; Rani Massalha; Michael Eckelt; Johannes Jancke; Marsel Kalvo; Nefes Polat; Christel Henon; Lilian Eche
- Starring: Damla Sönmez
- Cinematography: Eric Devin
- Edited by: Véronique Lange
- Music by: Bassel Hallak, Pi
- Release dates: 3 August 2018 (Locarno); 22 February 2019 (Turkey)
- Running time: 95 minutes
- Countries: France; Germany; Luxembourg; Turkey
- Language: Turkish

Sibel is a 2018 award-winning Turkish drama film starring Damla Sönmez and directed by Çagla Zencirci and Guillaume Giovanetti It was screened in the Contemporary World Cinema section at the 2018 Toronto International Film Festival.

== Plot ==
25 years old Sibel lives with her father and sister in a remote village in the mountains of Turkey's Black Sea region. She is mute and communicates by using the ancient whistled language of their region.

Despised by her fellow villagers, she relentlessly hunts down a wolf sneaking in the neighboring forest, sparking off fears and fantasies among the villagers. There she crosses path with an injured and vulnerable fugitive, who is the first one to see her differently.

== Cast ==
- Damla Sönmez as Sibel
- Emin Gürsoy as Emin
- Erkan Kolçak Köstendil as Ali
- Elit Iscan as Fatma
- Meral Çetinkaya as Narin

== Reception ==
On review aggregator website Rotten Tomatoes, the film holds an approval rating of 75% based on eight reviews, with an average rating of 7.3/10. On Metacritic, the film has a weighted average score of 65 out of 100 based on 4 reviews.ing "generally favorable reviews".

Jay Weissberg of Variety magazine praised Sibel's folklore and gender roles, while Jordan Mintzer of The Hollywood Reporter called it "a potent real-world feminist fable".
