= Nezaket Erden =

Turkish actress (born 1990)

- Born: 16 June 1990 (age 34); Mersin, Turkey
- Education: Galatasaray University
- Occupation: Actress

Nezaket Erden (born 16 June 1990) is a Turkish actress.

She is one of the founders of the professional theatre group Tiyatro Hemhal that operates in Istanbul. She won the Best Supporting Actress Award at the 57th and 58th Antalya Golden Orange Film Festival in recognition of her work on different cinematic productions.

== Life and career ==
Erden was born on 16 June 1990 in Mersin. After completing her primary and secondary education in Mersin, she settled in Istanbul and studied philosophy at Galatasaray University. She entered the drama club in college. After appearing on stage for her university theatre, she studied at Akademi 35.5 Art House with a scholarship.

In 2016, she completed Kadir Has University's Film and Drama-Acting Program. As a graduation project, she worked with Hakan Emre Ünal, who was a graduate student at the same university at the time, to adapt Latife Tekin's novel Dear Shameless Death for the stage. She also staged the one-man play Dirmit, based on the main character in the novel. For her role in this play, she was received a nomination for the Most Successful Actress of the Year at the 23rd Afife Theatre Awards. In 2018, together with Hakan Emre Ünal and Ayşe Draz, she founded the professional theatre group Tiyatro Hemhal in Istanbul.

In the 2020 movie İnsanlar İkiye Ayrılır she portrayed the character of Tilbe. For this role, she shared the Best Supporting Actress award at the 57th Antalya Golden Orange Film Festival with Nalan Kuruçim. In 2021, she played the character Serpil in Selman Nacar's first feature film İki Şafak Arasında, for which she was awarded the Best Supporting Actress award at the 58th Antalya Golden Orange Film Festival.

== Filmography ==
Television
Year	Title	Role	Network
2020	Baraj	Nermin	FOX
2021	Misafir	Betül	FOX
Streaming series and films
Year	Title	Role	Network
2022	Uysallar	Yağmur	Netflix
TBA	Bihter	Peyker	Netflix
Film
Year	Title	Role	Notes
2020	İnsanlar İkiye Ayrılır	Tilbe	
2020	Climate Change	İklim	Short film
2020	Nasipse Adayız	Nurse Pınar	
2021	İki Şafak Arasında	Serpil	
2021	Aykut Enişte 2	Selvi	

== Theatre ==
Theatre
Year	Title	Role	Venue
2017	Sevgili Arsız Ölüm		Sarı Sandalye Theatre
2018	Tırnak İçinde Hizmetçiler		Tiyatro Hemhâl
2018	Sevgili Doktor		Tiyatro Hemhâl

== Awards and nominations ==
Year	Organization	Category	Work	Result	Reference
2019	23rd Afife Theatre Awards	Best Actress	Sevgili Arsız Ölüm: Dirmit	Nominated	
2020	57th Antalya Golden Orange Film Festival	Best Supporting Actress	İnsanlar İkiye Ayrılır	Won	
2021	58th Antalya Golden Orange Film Festival	Best Supporting Actress	İki Şafak Arasında	Won	
2022	54th Turkish Film Critics Association (SİYAD) Awards	Best Supporting Actress	İnsanlar İkiye Ayrılır	Won	
