= Ali Özgentürk =

Turkish film director, screenwriter and film producer (1945–2025)

- Born: Ali Habib Özgentürk; 4 November 1945; Adana, Turkey
- Died: 15 May 2025 (aged 79); Istanbul, Turkey
- Occupations: Film director, screenwriter, film producer
- Family: Nebil Özgentürk (brother)

Ali Özgentürk (4 November 1945 – 15 May 2025) was a Turkish film director, screenwriter and producer.

== Life and career ==
Özgentürk was born in Adana, Turkey on 4 November 1945. After studying philosophy and sociology at Istanbul University, he became involved in theater, as an actor, director, and playwright. He founded Istanbul's first street theater troupe in 1968. He began working in the Turkish film industry in 1974 as a camera assistant, and eventually became an assistant and screenwriter for famous Kurdish film directors such as Atıf Yılmaz and Yılmaz Güney.

In 1977, Özgentürk wrote the screenplay for director Atıf Yılmaz's film Selvi Boylum, Al Yazmalım (The Girl with the Red Scarf), which would go on to become a major hit in Turkey. In 1979, Özgentürk directed his first feature, Hazal, which he co-wrote with Onat Kutlar. The film won awards at the Mannheim Film Festival, Prades Film Festival, and the Best New Director award at the San Sebastián International Film Festival. Ozgenturk followed it in 1982 with At (The Horse), which screened at the Cannes Film Festival and won major awards at the Valencia Film Festival and the Tokyo International Film Festival, which awarded it the Ozu Award, carrying a cash prize of $250,000. His third feature, 1985's Bekςi (The Guardian), an adaptation of Turkish novelist Orhan Kemal's classic novel Murtaza, is the first Turkish film to screen in competition at the Venice Film Festival.

Özgentürk courted controversy with his fourth film, Su da Yanar (Water Also Burns, 1987), which concerned a director attempting to make a film about the life of controversial Turkish poet Nâzım Hikmet.

In 2000, Özgentürk directed Balalayka, which would go on to become a major box office hit in Turkey. The film ran into trouble early in its production when its original lead actor, Kemal Sunal, died of a heart attack while boarding a plane to the film's location in Trabzon. He was replaced in the part by the Turkish actor Uğur Yücel.

Özgentürk wrote and directed Yengeç Oyunu (The Crab Game), a 2009 film shot on location in Egypt, Alexandria. It opened in 51 screens across Turkey on 3 April 2009 at number thirteen in the Turkish box office chart with an opening weekend gross of $14,095. Yengeç Oyunu was later screened at the 21st Ankara International Film Festival in March 2010.

== Death ==
Özgentürk died on 15 May 2025, at the age of 79.

== Filmography ==
- At (The Horse) (1982)
- Bekci (The Guardian) (1985)
- Hazal (1979)
- Su da yanar (Water Also Burns) (1987)
- Ciplak (The Nude) (1991)
- Sir (1997)
- Mektup (1998)
- Yengeç Oyunu (The Crab Game) (2009)

== Awards ==
- 1980 Prades Film Festival First Prize for Hazal
- 1980 Mannheim Film Festival Golden Ducat Award for Hazal
- 1980 Mannheim Film Festival Ecumenical Jury Award for Hazal
- 1980 Mannheim Film Festival Audience Award for Hazal
- 1980 San Sebastian Film Festival Best New Director Award for Hazal
- 1982 Valencia Film Festival Second Place Prize for At (The Horse)
- 1983 São Paulo Film Festival Second Place Prize for At (The Horse)
- 1983 Lecce Film Festival Grand Prize for At (The Horse)
- 1985 Tokyo Film Festival Yasujirō Ozu Award for At (The Horse)
- 1986 Strasbourg Human Rights Film Festival Second Place Prize for Bekci (The Guardian)
- 1993 Antalya Film Festival Special Jury Prize for Ciplak (The Nude)
