= Savaş =

Savaş is a Turkish masculine given name that means "war, battle, fighting, warfare". It is also used as a surname. Notable people with the name are as follows:

== Given name ==
=== First name ===
- Savaş Ay (1954–2013), Turkish journalist
- Savaş Buldan (1964–1994), Turkish drug trafficker
- Savaş Dinçel (1942–2007), Turkish actor
- Savaş Kaya (born 1986), Turkish boxer
- Savaş Polat (born 1997), Turkish football player
- Savaş Yılmaz (born 1990), Turkish football player
- Kool Savas, stage name of Savaş Yurderi (born 1975), German rapper and hip hop artist of Turkish descent

=== Middle name ===
- Asaf Savaş Akat (born 1943), Turkish economist and academic
- Hakan Savaş Mican (born 1978), German-Turkish filmmaker, playwright and director

== Surname ==
- Ayşegül Savaş, Turkish writer
- Lütfü Savaş (born 1965), Turkish politician and physician
- Oğuz Savaş (born 1987), Turkish basketball player
- Perihan Savaş (born 1957), Turkish actress
- Ragıp Savaş, Turkish actor and singer
- Sadık Savaş (born 1987), Turkish paralympic archer
- Vahit Emre Savaş (born 1995), Turkish volleyball player

== See also ==
- Siyâvash, similar Persian name.
