= Gece Gündüz =

Turkish police procedural television series

- Genre: Police procedural soap opera
- Written by: Sevgi Saygi
- Directed by: Metin Balekoglu; Sarp Levendoğlu; Oguzhan Tercan
- Starring: Sarp Levendoğlu; Settar Tanrıöğen; İpek Özkök; Bülent Şakrak; Ushan Çakır; Damla Sönmez; Ayşen Gruda
- Theme music composer: Âşık Veysel Şatıroğlu
- Opening theme: "Gündüz Gece"
- Composer: Mehmet Can Erdogan
- Country of origin: Turkey
- Original language: Turkish
- No. of seasons: 1
- No. of episodes: 29

Production
- Production company: Altıoklar Productions

Original release
- Release: 4 July 2008 – 22 March 2009

Gece Gündüz is a Turkish police procedural soap opera produced by the Altıoklar Productions. The main characters are Aslan Aydemir (portrayed by Sarp Levendoğlu) and Kemal (portrayed by Settar Tanrıöğen). They both work at the Istanbul Organized Crime section of the police force. The series finished on its 33rd episode.

The main characters are police officers Aslan Aydemir (portrayed by Sarp Levendoğlu) and Kemal (portrayed by Settar Tanrıöğen), alongside journalist Alev (portrayed by İpek Özkök); the series premiered on Kanal D on 4 July 2008.

== Characters ==
- Sarp Levendoğlu - Chief inspector Aslan Aydemir

Aslan is a hotshot police officer around his early-30s. He lost his wife in a terrorist action while serving in the army (It is unknown as what though) against the PKK. He then has a romantic involvement with one of the other characters (Alev) and this later turns into a serious romance relationship towards the middle of the soap.

- Settar Tanrıöğen - Chief Inspector Kemal

Kemal is an elder police officer more calmer than Aslan and has a family. He has a wife and three children, a male (Toprak) and two females (Lale and Akasya). CI Kemal always complains that he's retirement is coming up and then he wants to leave the force because he is so burned out and because Aslan is a crazier police officer, Kemal is a bit upset. He claims once that "I am not going to live to 2010" at the second episode.

- İpek Özkök - Alev

At the start of the soap, Alev was an ordinary news reporter. She was relentless and wanted to be one of the shining stars in the job. At first, she has a couple of run-ins that leave Aslan in hot water but as the soap progressed her love is surfaced.

- Damla Sönmez - Pınar

She is rarely seen at the start and she later seems to dissolve throughout the middle of the soap. She is the sister of Alev. She, at first, was the more younger and casual person. Aggressive and non-responsible, it later affects her life badly. After the bad effect, she decided to put her life straight and studied more.

- Bülent Şakrak - Sipsi

Sipsi is the non-police source of Aslan. As Sipsi is more into the gangs and the back alleys of Istanbul. Sipsi supplies Aslan with information about the criminals that Aslan is trying to apprehend. The latest is that he supplied Aslan and Kemal an energy efficient jeep looking van and that Aslan and Kemal always has problems with it.

- Ushan Çakır - Yavuz

Yavuz is another police officer that work in the same department as Aslan and Kemal. He is around the same age as Aslan and is in love with Akasya, Kemal's daughter, that Kemal later finds out. Akasya is having problems with Yavuz about her work. This hinders their relationship and it seems that, at the current state, their relationship is at a breaking point. Kemal always refers to Yavuz as "Crazy Mad Guy" and "The second Aslan".

- Ceren Olcay - Akasya

Akasya is the elder sister of Lale and Kemal's elder daughter. She has a relationship with Yavuz which seems to be in jeopardy. Akasya is an amateur actress, later turns professional, and that she started to show up in soaps and films. She spends most of her time on her work and this means that she has less time to spend with Yavuz as Yavuz always complains about this, it was him who put the ordering line and probably the end of the relationship. "Make a decision, Your job or your family & friends (including me) life" The soap hints that she picks her job and finalizes the relationship.

- Okan Albayrak - Optik

Optik, as referred by Aslan, is the technical member of the Organized Crime section. His job is mainly on the PC, which he at first complained about but as the soap progressed he is involved in the team, and he has a Platonic-style love against Yağmur.

- Gül Onat - Neriman

Neriman is Kemal's wife and the mother of Akasya, Toprak and Lale. Because Kemal's age he has some health issues that she overtly tries to help him regain. These include just giving him vegetables, which draws complaints from Kemal, etc.

- Ruken Demirer- Nazlı

Nazlı is Sipsi's female assistant. She makes Sipsi angry when she shows some promiscuous act against the crazy cop Aslan.

- Ayşen Gruda - Hayriye

Hayriye is Aslan's landlord and it seems that she also has an interest with him at first but this is later changed to show as she claimed at one point "I hired the house to you because you're a police officer" when Aslan was told about a theory that there was a robber in the apartment. Hayriye had serious romantic feelings towards Kemal and when she learned out that Kemal is married to Neriman, she starts to play around and call Neriman, Keriman, which is another traditional Turkish female and both given name and surname.
