= Zeynel Doğan =

- Born: 10 October 1979 (age 46); Elbistan, Kahramanmaraş, Turkey
- Education: Anadolu University
- Occupations: Film director, actor, executive editor
- Years active: 2002–present
- Awards: The Golden Boll for Best Film (Voice of My Father, 2012); The Golden Boll for Best Screenplay (Voice of My Father, 2012); Istanbul Film Festival Best Screenplay Award (Voice of My Father, 2012)

Zeynel Doğan (pronounced [zejnel doan]; born 10 October 1979) is a Kurdish actor and film director.

Doğan graduated with a degree in Journalism from Anadolu University in 2002. In conjunction with Özgür Doğan and Orhan Eskiköy, he founded the initiative Perişan Film. He also coordinates the Diyarbakır Media Center, which trains local youth in contemporary video practice.

== Filmography ==
Feature films

- Voice of My Father, as Mehmet, 2012 (also credited as director)

== Awards ==
As director

- The Golden Boll for Best Film (Voice of My Father, 2012)
- The Golden Boll for Best Screenplay (Voice of My Father, 2012)
- Istanbul Film Festival Best Screenplay Award (Voice of My Father, 2012)
