= Voice of My Father =

- Turkish: Babamın Sesi
- Kurdish: Dengê Bavê Min
- Directed by: Orhan Eskiköy; Zeynel Doğan
- Written by: Orhan Eskiköy
- Produced by: Özgür Doğan
- Starring: Basê Doğan; Zeynel Doğan; Hasan Doğan; Gülizar Doğan
- Cinematography: Emre Erkmen
- Edited by: Orhan Eskiköy; Çiçek Kahraman
- Production company: Perişan Film
- Distributed by: Tiglon Film
- Release date: January 29, 2012 (World Premiere)
- Running time: 88 minutes
- Countries: Turkey; Germany; France
- Languages: Kurdish; Turkish

Voice of My Father (Turkish: Babamın Sesi, Kurdish: Dengê Bavê Min) is a 2012 drama film directed by Orhan Eskiköy and Zeynel Doğan and written by Eskiköy. Its world premiere took place in the International Rotterdam Film Festival on 29 January 2012. A Germany, France and Turkey co-production filmed in Diyarbakır and Elbistan, Voice of My Father tells the story of a Kurdish-Alevi family affected by the Maraş Massacre. Having won the "Best Film" and "Best Screenplay" awards in The Golden Boll and another "Best Screenplay" in Istanbul Film Festival, the film is based on actual events which, film's co-director and lead actor, Zeynel Doğan's family had gone through and its central story is focused on actual tapes left from his father.

== Synopsis ==
Basê lives in Elbistan by herself. She wants her eldest son Hasan to return home and establish a new life. She also believes the silent phone calls which she receives frequently are from Hasan. Her younger son Mehmet lives in Diyarbakır and Mehmet learns that he's about to become a father. He moves to a new house and while moving finds a tape in between his belongings, recorded to be sent to his father, that contains his and his mother's voice. Mehmet then leaves to Elbistan to find out the tapes his father recorded and to persuade his mother to live with him in Diyarbakır. However, he finds his mother thinking about nothing but Hasan and slowly starts to enter his mother's world. He repairs stuff that his mother asked him to and does all the gardening work. At the same time keeps looking for the tapes, his father had sent. Although Basê tries to distance him from the existence of the tapes by telling him that there are no such tapes left, she fails to deter. As Mehmet continues looking for the tapes, he begins learning things about his family he didn't know before.

== Cast ==
- Zeynel Doğan as Mehmet
- Basê Doğan as Basê
- Gülizar Doğan as Gülizar
- Hasan Doğan as Hasan

== Awards ==
- 19th International Adana Golden Boll Film Festival (17–23 September 2012)
  - Best Screenplay (Won), Best Film (Won)
- 31st International Istanbul Film Festival (31 March - 14 April 2012)
  - Best Screenplay (Won)

== See also ==
- 2012 in film
- Turkish films of 2012
