= Rabbit à la Berlin =

2009 film by Bartosz Konopka

Rabbit à la Berlin (Polish: Królik po berlińsku, Deutsch: Mauerhase) is a 2009 documentary film, directed by Bartosz Konopka. The script was written by Konopka and Mateusz Romaszkan, and the movie was a joint German-Polish production with the producers Heino Deckert and Anna Wydra. It was nominated for an Oscar in 2010 for Best Documentary, Short Subject. It has also won awards at the Kraków Film Festival and the Hot Docs Canadian International Documentary Festival.

The film tells the story of the Berlin Wall but from point of view of a group of wild rabbits that inhabited the zone between the two walls separating West Berlin from East Germany during the Cold War.

== See also ==
- Involuntary park
