= Aslı Özge =

Turkish director, scenarist and producer (born 1975)

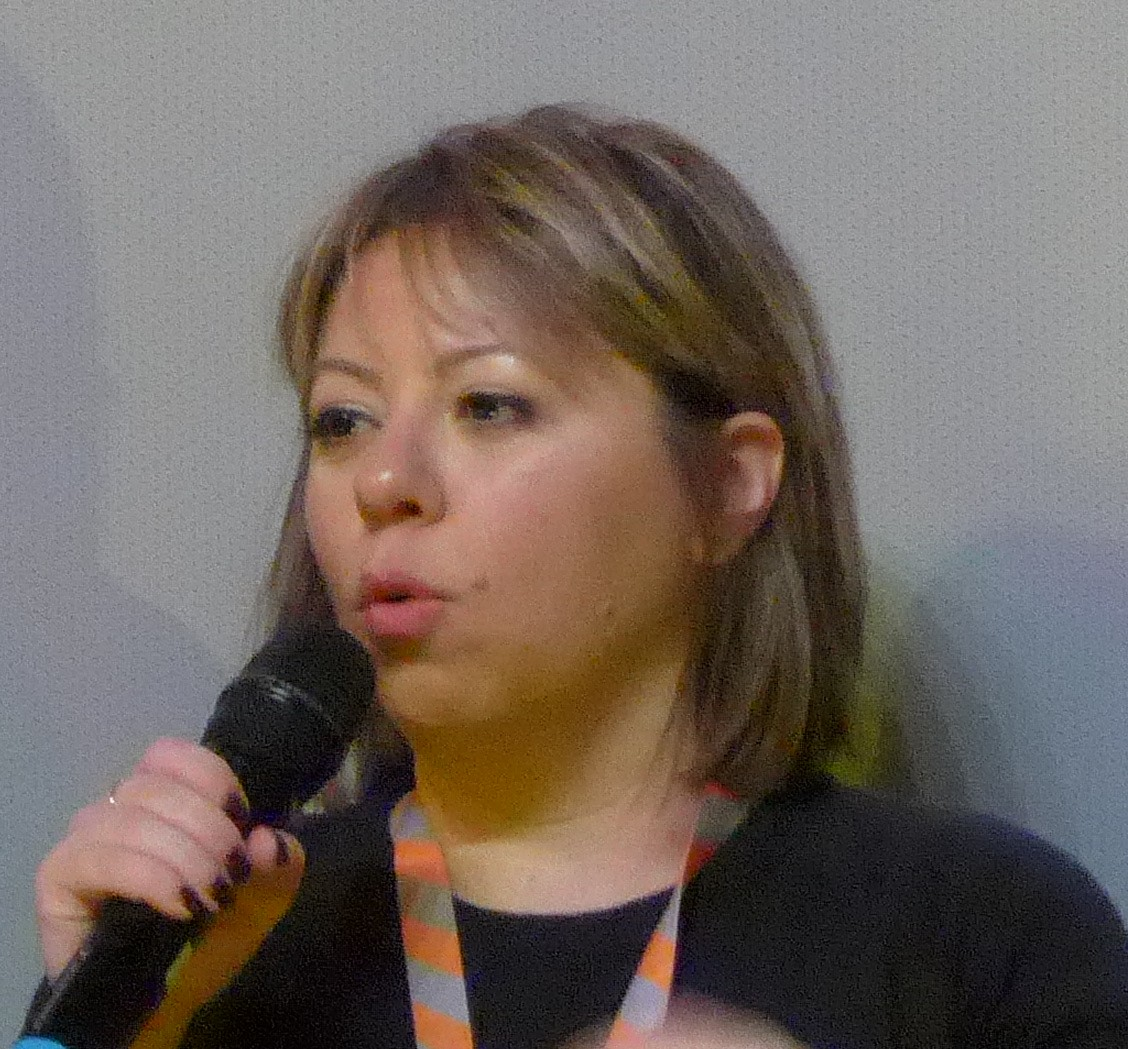
- Özge in 2016
- Born: 3 July 1975 (age 50); Istanbul, Turkey
- Occupations: Director, scenarist, producer
- Years active: 2003–present

Aslı Özge (born 3 July 1975 / 1 January 1975 (?)) is a Turkish director, scenarist and producer.

== Early life ==
Özge was born on 1 January 1975 (?) in Istanbul. She graduated from Marmara University, Faculty of Fine Arts, Department of Cinema and Television. During her time as a student, her short film Capital C was shown at many festivals and won prizes. After graduation, she settled in Berlin where she studied philosophy.

== Career ==
In 2003, she directed her feature film April with the support of German Film and Television Academy and a German TV channel. This film was not released in Turkey.

In 2005, she completed the filming of her documentary titled Hesperos'un Çömezleri in Istanbul. Her feature film Soluksuz was awarded the Balkan Fund Script Development Award at the 46th International Thessaloniki Film Festival.

In 2009, he wrote and directed the film titled Men on the Bridge.

She has continued to work in both Turkey and Germany, and her movie Lifelong (Hayatboyu) was released in 2013.

== Filmography ==
=== Feature films ===
- Men on the Bridge (Köprüdekiler) (2009)
- Lifelong (Hayatboyu) (2013)
- All of a Sudden (Auf Einmal) (2016)
- Black Box (2023)
- Faruk (film) (2024)

=== Television ===
- Ein Bisschen April (Biraz Nisan) (TV Film) (2003)

=== Documentary films ===
- Hesperos'un Çömezleri (2005)

=== Short films ===
- Capital C (2000)
- Zamana dair Parçalar (2000)
- Quirck (1999)
- 3 ETC (1998)
- Aslında (1997)

== Awards ==
Year	Nominee / work	Award	Result
2000	Capital C	22nd İFSAK National Short Film and Documentary Competition, Fiction Video, Best Film Award	Won
2009	Men on the Bridge	16th Golden Boll Film Festival, Grand Jury Best Film Award	Won
2009	Men on the Bridge	28th International Istanbul Film Festival, Best Turkish Film	Won
2010	Men on the Bridge	21st International Ankara Film Festival, Best Film	Won
2013	Lifelong	32nd International Istanbul Film Festival, Best Director	Won
2016	All of a Sudden	35th International Istanbul Film Festival, FIPRESCI Award	Won
2016	All of a Sudden	International Berlin Film Festival	Won
