= İpek Özkök =

Turkish actress and model (born 1982)

İpek Özkök (born 17 April 1982 in Istanbul) is a Turkish actress and model.

== Career ==
Of Circassian descent, she is best known for hit police series "Gece Gündüz" and hit crime series "Kurtlar Vadisi Pusu". Özkök began modeling in 2003 and appeared in many commercials. A gifted diatonic button accordion player, she founded an all-female ensemble, "Warada Mızıka", dedicated to Circassian music.

== Filmography ==
Film
Year	Title	Role	Notes
2009	The Ringing Ball	Semra	

Television
Year	Title	Role	Notes
2004	Camdan Papuçlar		
2005	Beyaz Gelincik	Aslı	
2005	Güz Yangını	Naz	TV mini-series
2007	Son Tercih	Nil	
2007	Yalan Dünya	Filiz	
2008	Aman Annem Görmesin	Ebru	
2008	Gece Gündüz	Alev Tuna	
2009–2010	Aşk Bir Hayal	Nevin	
2013–2014	Huzur Sokağı	Hacer	
