= On the Way to School =

- Theatrical poster
- Directed by: Orhan Eskiköy; Özgür Doğan
- Written by: Orhan Eskiköy; Özgür Doğan
- Produced by: Orhan Eskiköy; Özgür Doğan
- Cinematography: Orhan Eskiköy
- Edited by: Thomas Balkenhol
- Production company: Peri-San Film
- Distributed by: Tiglon Film
- Release dates: November 25, 2008 (IDFA Festival); October 23, 2009 (Turkey)
- Country: Turkey
- Language: Turkish
- Budget: €209,000 (estimated)
- Box office: $399,581

On the Way to School (Turkish: İki Dil Bir Bavul) is a 2008 Turkish documentary film directed by Orhan Eskiköy and Özgür Doğan. It has attracted 78,000 people in eight weeks, an impressive showing for a documentary.

The film is an openhearted account of a young Turkish teacher during a school year in a Kurdish village in southeastern Turkey.

== Production ==
Film production began in September 2007 and was completed in June 2008.

== Release ==
=== General release ===
The film opened in 22 screens across Turkey on October 23, 2009 at number five in the Turkish box office chart with an opening weekend gross of $60,387.

== Reception ==
=== Box office ===
The film debuted number five in the Turkish box office chart and has made a total gross of $399,581.

=== Awards ===
- 3rd International Middle East Film Festival (9-17 Oct, 2009) - Black Pearl Award for best Middle Eastern documentary film (Won)
- 46th Antalya Golden Orange Film Festival (10-17 Oct, 2009) - Golden Orange for Best First Film: Özgür Dogan & Orhan Eskikoy (Won)
- 21st Ankara International Film Festival (11–21 March 2010) - Mahmut Tali Öngören Special Award (Won)

== Locations ==
The film was photographed mostly in Demirci village which is in Şanlıurfa, Turkey.

== See also ==
- 2008 in film
- Turkish films of 2008
