= Dieter Zeppenfeld =

Dieter Zeppenfeld from the University of Wisconsin–Madison, was awarded the status of Fellow in the American Physical Society, after they were nominated by their Division of Particles and Fields in 1999, for pioneering contributions to the theoretical formulation of effective electroweak gauge boson interactions in a model-independent way and in the linear-sigma model, which initiated phenomenological and experimental studies of gauge boson anomalous coup.

== See also ==
- List of fellows of the American Physical Society (1998–2010)
