= Güllerin Savaşı =

Turkish television series

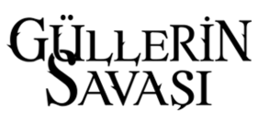
- Genre: Romance; Drama
- Written by: Sırma Yanık
- Directed by: Emre Kabakuşak
- Starring: Damla Sönmez; Canan Ergüder
- Theme music composer: Cem Tuncer; Nail Yurtsever; Ercüment Orkut
- Country of origin: Turkey
- Original language: Turkish
- No. of seasons: 2
- No. of episodes: 68

Production
- Producer: Fatih Aksoy
- Production company: Med Yapım

Original release
- Network: Kanal D
- Release: 8 July 2014 – 6 February 2016

Güllerin Savaşı, is a Turkish television series, produced by Med Yapım and broadcast on Kanal D from July 8, 2014 to February 6, 2016. It starred Damla Sönmez as Gülru Çelik and Canan Ergüder as Gülfem Sipahi.

== Plot ==
Gülru was born in one of the slums of Istanbul and then grew up in a high class neighborhood in a mansion where her father works as a gardener. From the age of 6, Gülru lives the dream of being like Gülfem. In order to live in a great mansion, Gülru learns to balance the differences of a lifestyle in which she was born and the other lifestyle that she finally lives.

From a very early age, Gülru and Mert had a sweet childhood love. Years later, when Gülfem returns home, Gülru remembers her childhood dream. When Gülru and Gülfem meet Omer, tension begins to accumulate in the mansion and in the neighborhood, confusing Gülru. At the same time that it allows to feel loved, dreams and reality fade away. With Gülfem at the climax of her life and Gülru living her dreams, this story will continue as a war of passions, affecting the lives of everyone else.

== Cast ==
- Damla Sönmez - Gülru Çelik
- Canan Ergüder - Gülfem Sipahi
- Barış Kılıç - Ömer Hekimoğlu
- Sercan Badur - Cihan Sipahi
- Yiğit Kirazcı as Mert Gencer
- Atilla Şendil - Salih Çelik
- Arif Pişkin - Şevket Hekimoğlu
- Arsen Gürzap - Cahide Hekimoğlu
- Meltem Pamirtan - Mesude Çelik Yıldırım
- Münire Apaydın - Mebrure Hekimoğlu
- Zeynep Köse - Yonca Çelik
- Turgay Tanülkü - Recep Gencer
- Berk Yaygın - Yener Yıldırım
- Aslı İçözü - Halide Demir
- Pınar Afsar - Ayla Sipahi
- Feyza Civelek - Çiçek Çelik
- Uğur Kurul - Taner Hekimoğlu
- Güzin Alkan - Naciye Gencer
- İsmail Oral - İsmail
- Çisem Çancı - Ceylan Gencer
- Ceren Koç - Mine
- Serap Aksoy - Cahide Hekimoğlu

== Episodes ==
Season	Episodes	Range of episodes	Original broadcast	
Season	Episodes	Range of episodes	Start	End
1	48	1–48	July 8, 2014	June 13, 2015
2	20	49–68	September 5, 2015	February 6, 2016

== See also ==
- Television in Turkey
- List of Turkish television series
- Turkish television drama
