= Temo Re =

- Georgian: თემო რე
- Directed by: Anka Gujabidze
- Written by: Temo Rekhviashvili; Anka Gujabidze; Salome Asatiani
- Starring: Temo Rekhviashvili; Natalia Gabisonia; Mikheil Abramishvili; Sandro Kalandadze; Tamara Chumashvili
- Release date: 2025
- Running time: 50 minutes
- Country: Georgia
- Language: Georgian

Temo Re (Georgian: თემო რე) is a Georgian film by Anka Gujabidze. The film premiered in 2025 at International Film Festival Rotterdam, where it won two awards: the Tiger Short Award and the KNF Award

== Plot ==
Temo Re is an adaptation of Temo Rekhviashvili's debut novel Courier's Tales. The film is constructed as a black-and-white photomontage and combines elements of fiction and documentary cinema.

Temo is an actor who also works as a courier. Over the course of a single day, he travels across Tbilisi on a moped and performs in a suburban theatre in the evening. The poverty, injustice, corruption, and alienation he encounters during the day gradually transform into disturbing visions that haunt him at night.

== Cast ==
- Temo Rekhviashvili as Temo Re
- Mikheil Abramishvili as Forest Spirit
- Sandro Kalandadze as The Craftsman
- Natalia Gabisonia as The Manager
- Tamara Chumashvili as The Manager’s Assistant
- Davit Gabunia as District Governor’s Bodyguard
- Gaga Shishinashvili as The District Governor
- Gigi Rekhviashvili as Brother
- Nanita Rekhviashvili as Sister
- Akaki Sioridze as Theatre Actor
- Ilia Korkashvili as Boy in the Forest
- Beka Khachidze as Boy in the Forest
- Tamar Davladze as Mother
- Neli Chichinadze as Grandmother on the Balcony
- Gvantsa Enukidze as Journalist in the Square
- Anano Makharadze as Journalist in the Square
- Irakli Sirbilashvili as Cameraman in the Square
- Davit Khorbaladze as Cameraman in the Square
- Lana Kavrelishvili as Camerawoman in the Square
- Irakli Grdzelishvili as Audience Member in the Theatre
- Avto Diasamidze as Audience Member in the Theatre
- Nino Zhvania as Audience Member in the Theatre
- Anano Alavidze as Journalist in the Square

== Awards ==
- Tiger Short Award
- KNF Award
- SFCC Critics’ Award
- Golden Prometheus – Best Fiction Short Film
