= Orhan Eskiköy =

Turkish film director

- Born: January 1, 1980; Istanbul, Turkey
- Occupation: Director

Orhan Eskiköy (born 1 January 1980) is a Turkish director.

He studied at the Faculty of Communication at Ankara University. In the second grade, he took part in a project with Özgür Doğan. In this period, he decided to make documentary films as an amateur.

In 2003, together with Özgür Doğan, they decided to make a film about "miscommunication", but when financial problems intervened, they postponed the film. In September 2007, they began the film with their own efforts, and later received support from the Greenhouse Documentary Development Workshop, the Sundance Documentary Fund and the Dutch Jan Vrijman Fund. After nine months of work, they completed the documentary film On the Way to School. The film received several awards from various festivals, including the Best Film Award at the Golden Orange Film Festival.

As Sundance aimed to create an environment in which new talents can develop original film projects and work with leading writers and directors, it initiated Sundance Lab in Istanbul and chose four directors to oversee the project, one of whom was Eskiköy.

In 2012, he shot a film called Voice of My Father with Zeynel Doğan about the story of a Kurdish-Alevi family affected by the Maraş massacre.

== Filmography ==
- İki Dil Bir Bavul (2008)
- Babamın Sesi (2011)
- Başgan (2016)
- Taş (2017)
