= Özgür Doğan =

Kurdish filmdirector

- Born: January 1, 1978 (age 48); Muş, Turkey
- Education: Master in Media and Culture Studies
- Occupation: Filmirector

Özgür Doğan (1 January 1978) is a Kurdish filmdirector. His works include On the Way to School and Voice of My Father.

== Biography ==
Özgür Doğan was born in a Kurdish village in Varto, Muş. He spoke only in Kurdish until the age of 6, and started to learn Turkish after that age. He stayed there until he was 10. Because they only had a primary school in the village, he and his four siblings alternately studied with their uncles. After finishing middle school in Trabzon, due to the poor financial situation of his uncle there, Doğan went to stay with his other uncle in Konya. After two years of studying there, he went to Ankara to attend high school. In 2001, he graduated from Ankara University Faculty of Communication. When his brother was in prison, he started to work with Orhan Eskiköy on a project called Hayaller Birer Kırık Ayna. In 2001, he became a research assistant at the Middle East Technical University. In 2004, he got his master's degree in Media and Cultural Studies at the same university.

In 2003, together with Özgür Doğan, they decided to make a film about "miscommunication", but when financial problems intervened, they postponed the film. In September 2007 they began the film with their own efforts, and later received support from the Greenhouse Documentary Development Workshop, the Sundance Documentary Fund and the Dutch Jan Vrijman Fund. After nine months of work, they completed the documentary film On the Way to School. The film received several awards from various festivals, including the Best Film Award at the Golden Orange Film Festival.
