= Pelin Esmer =

Turkish screenwriter and director

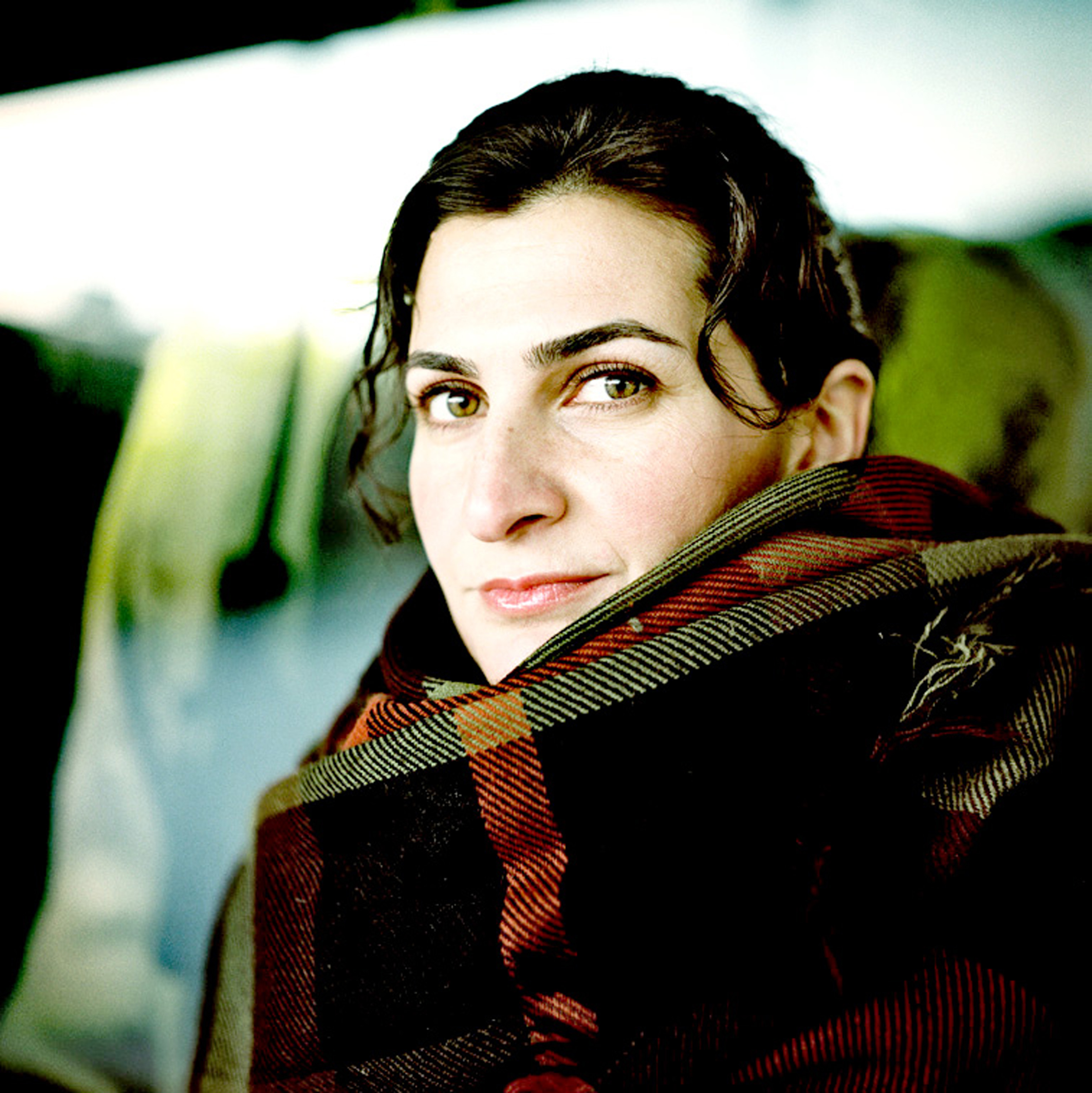
- Pelin Esmer in 2019.
- Born: 3 May 1972 (age 54); Istanbul, Turkey
- Education: Boğaziçi University
- Occupations: Film director, screenwriter, film producer
- Years active: 1995–present
- Website: pelinesmer.com

Pelin Esmer (born 3 May 1972, Istanbul) is a Turkish Film director, screenwriter and film producer.

== Career ==
Pelin Esmer studied sociology at the social sciences department of Boğaziçi University in Istanbul. She made her first short documentary, Koleksiyoncu (The Collector) about her uncle Mithat Esmer, who is also the main character of her first fiction feature, 10 to 11 (2009). Her 2005 work, Oyun, was filmed in Arslanköy and documents the efforts of a group of peasant women who produce a play based on their lives. Her 2012 film, Watchtower, earned five awards, including Best Director at the Adana Golden Boll Film Festival.

== Filmography ==
- 2002 Koleksiyoncu: The Collector (documentary)
- 2005 Oyun (documentary)
- 2009 10 to 11
- 2012 Watchtower
- 2017 Something Useful
- 2019 Queen Lear
- 2025 And The Rest Will Follow

== Awards ==
- Yilmaz Güney Award at the Adana Golden Boll Film Festival 2006 (for Oyun)
- Best film from the Black Sea region 2006 (for Oyun)
- Best film and best script at the Adana Golden Boll Film Festival 2009 (for 10 to 11)
- Best young filmmaker from the Middle East region at the Middle East Film Festival Abu Dhabi in 2009 (for 10 to 11)
