= List of LGBTQ-related films of 2019 =

This is a list of lesbian, gay, bisexual, transgender or queer-related films released in 2019. It contains theatrically released films that deal with important gay, lesbian, bisexual, transgender or queer characters or issues and may have same-sex romance or relationships as a plot device.

== Films ==
Title	Director	Country	Genre	Cast	Notes	Ref
1 Versus 100	Bruno Kohfield-Galeano	United States	Drama	Anna McClean, Charla Cochran, Walter Mecham, Jill Adler, Whitney Palmer, Danny Royce		
The Acrobat (L'Acrobate)	Rodrigue Jean	Canada	Drama	Sébastien Ricard, Yury Paulau		
Adam	Rhys Ernst	United States	Comedy	Nicholas Alexander, Bobbi Salvör Menuez (credited as India Menuez), Leo Sheng	Screenplay by Ariel Schrag, based on her novel of the same name	
Alice Júnior	Gil Baroni	Brazil	Comedy	Anna Celestino Mota, Emmanuel Rosset, Surya Amitrano		
And Then We Danced	Levan Akin	Sweden; Georgia	Drama	Levan Gelbakhiani, Ana Javakishvili		
Before We Grow Old (Heute oder morgen)	Thomas Moritz Helm	Germany	Drama	Tala Gouveia, Paula Knüpling, Maximilian Hildebrandt		
Before You Know It	Hannah Utt	United States	Comedy	Mandy Patinkin, Hannah Utt, Jen Tullock, Judith Light		
Bit	Brad Michael Elmore	United States	Supernatural drama			
The Blonde One (Un rubio)	Marco Berger	Argentina	Drama			
The Blue Flower of Novalis (A rosa azul de Novalis)	Gustavo Vinagre, Rodrigo Carneiro	Brazil	Drama			
Blue Boy	Manuel Abramovich	Argentina	Short, Documentary			
Brief Story from the Green Planet (Breve historia del planeta verde)	Santiago Loza	Argentina; Germany; Brazil; Spain	Drama	Romina Escobar, Paula Grinszpan, Luis Sodá		
Booksmart	Olivia Wilde	United States	Comedy	Kaitlyn Dever, Beanie Feldstein	Wilde's directorial debut	
Circus of Books	Rachel Mason	United States	Documentary			
Cousins	Mauro Carvalho, Thiago Cazado	Brazil	Drama	Thiago Cazado, Paulo Sousa, Denis Camargo		
A Dog Barking at the Moon	Xiang Zi	China	Drama	Naren Hua		
Docking	Trevor Anderson	Canada	Experimental short			
Downton Abbey	Michael Engler	United Kingdom, United States	Drama	Hugh Bonneville, Jim Carter, Michelle Dockery, Elizabeth McGovern, Maggie Smith, Imelda Staunton, Penelope Wilton	A historical drama film which continues the storyline from the series of the same name.	
Drag Kids	Megan Wennberg	Canada	Documentary			
Driveways	Andrew Ahn	United States	Drama	Hong Chau, Brian Dennehy		
Easy Love	Tamer Jandali	Germany	Drama			
Elisa & Marcela	Isabel Coixet	Spain	Drama	Natalia de Molina, Greta Fernández	Based on the first same-sex marriage in Spain	
End of the Century (Fin de siglo)	Lucio Castro	Argentina	Drama	Juan Barberini, Ramon Pujol, Mía Maestro		
False Belief	Lene Berg	Norway	Documentary			
From Zero to I Love You	Doug Spearman	United States	Drama	Scott Bailey, Darryl Stephens		
Fuccbois	Eduardo Roy Jr.	Philippines				
Gay Chorus Deep South	David Charles	United States	Documentary			
Greta	Armando Praça	Brazil	Drama			
The Ground Beneath My Feet (Der Boden unter den Füßen)	Marie Kreutzer	Austria	Drama	Valerie Pachner, Pia Hierzegger, Mavie Hörbiger		
Halston	Frédéric Tcheng	United States	Documentary			
Hector	Victoria Giesen Carvajal	Chile	Short, Drama			
Holy Beasts	Laura Amelia Guzman, Israel Cárdenas	Argentina	Drama			
Jim French: The Art of Masculinity	Sean Boyle	United States	Documentary		A positive look at the photographic career of Jim French, the creator and photographer behind Colt Studios	
Killing Patient Zero	Laurie Lynd	Canada	Documentary	Gaëtan Dugas		
Knives and Skin	Jennifer Reeder	United States	Drama	Raven Whitley, Ty Olwin, Marika Engelhardt		
Ek Ladki Ko Dekha Toh Aisa Laga	Shelly Chopra Dhar	India	Romantic comedy, drama	Anil Kapoor, Juhi Chawla, Sonam Kapoor		
Last Ferry	Jaki Bradley	USA	Drama	Ramon O. Torres, Sheldon Best, Myles Clohessy, Gabriel Sloyer, Larry Owens		
Lemebel	Joanna Reposi Garibaldi	Chile	Documentary			
Lingua Franca	Isabel Sandoval	United States, Philippines	Drama	Isabel Sandoval, Eamon Farren, Lynn Cohen, Lev Gorn		
Love, Spells and All That (Aşk, Büyü vs.)	Ümit Ünal	Turkey	Drama	Selen Uçer, Ece Dizdar, Ayşenil Şamlıoğlu		
Marco	Saleem Haddad	United Kingdom, Lebanon, Syria	Short, Drama	Zed Josef, Marwan Kaabour, Amal Haddad		
Matthias & Maxime	Xavier Dolan	Canada	Drama	Xavier Dolan, Gabriel D'Almeida Freitas		
Memories of My Body (Kucumbu Tubuh Indahku)	Garin Nugroho	Indonesia	Drama	Muhammad Khan, Randy Pangalila		
Moffie	Oliver Hermanus	South Africa	Drama	Kai Luke Brümmer, Ryan de Villiers, Matthew Vey		
Nagarkirtan	Kaushik Ganguly	India	Drama	Riddhi Sen, Ritwick Chakraborty		
A Night at Switch n' Play	Cody Stickels	United States	Documentary			
The Obituary of Tunde Johnson	Ali LeRoi	United States	Drama	Steven Silver, Nicola Peltz, Spencer Neville, Sammi Rotibi, Tembi Locke		
Our Dance of Revolution	Phillip Pike	Canada	Documentary	Angela Robertson, Rinaldo Walcott		
The Pit	Hristiana Raykova	Germany	Documentary			
Port Authority	Danielle Lessovitz	United States	Drama	Fionn Whitehead, Leyna Bloom, McCaul Lombardi		
Portrait of a Lady on Fire (Portrait de la jeune fille en feu)	Céline Sciamma	France	Drama	Adèle Haenel, Noémie Merlant, Valeria Golino		
Queering the Script	Gabrielle Zilkha	Canada	Documentary		Documentary about LGBTQ representation in media	
Rialto	Peter Mackie Burns	Ireland	Drama	Tom Vaughan-Lawlor, Tom Glynn-Carney		
Riot Girls	Jovanka Vuckovic	Canada	Science fiction	Madison Iseman, Paloma Kwiatkowski, Munro Chambers		
Rocketman	Dexter Fletcher	United Kingdom	Drama	Taron Egerton, Jamie Bell, Richard Madden, Bryce Dallas Howard	Based on the life and music of Elton John	
Saint Frances	Alex Thompson	United States	Drama			
Second Star on the Right	Ruth Caudeli	Colombia	Drama			
Sequin in a Blue Room	Samuel Van Grinsven	Australia	Thriller, drama, coming-of-age story	Conor Leach, Simon Croker, Jeremy Lindsay Taylor, Anthony Brandon Wong		
Shannon Amen	Chris Dainty	Canada	Animated short			
The Shiny Shrimps (Les crevettes pailletées)	Maxime Govare, Cédric Le Gallo	France	Comedy	Nicolas Gob, Alban Lenoir, Michaël Abiteboul, Geoffrey Couët		
Spiral	Kurtis David Harder	Canada	Horror	Jeffrey Bowyer-Chapman, Ari Cohen		
Standing on the Line	Paul-Émile d'Entremont	Canada	Documentary	David Testo, Anastasia Bucsis, Brock McGillis	Documentary about homophobia in sports	
The Strong Ones (Los fuertes)	Omar Zúñiga Hidalgo	Chile	Drama	Samuel González, Antonio Altamirano	Theatrical release in 2020. Based in the 2015 Teddy Award winner for Best Short Film, San Cristóbal.	
Take Me to Prom	Andrew Moir	Canada	Documentary			
Tremors (Temblores)	Jayro Bustamante	Guatemala; France	Drama	Juan Pablo Olyslager, Diane Bathen, Mauricio Armas Zebadúa		
The Two Lives of Li Ermao	Jia Yuchuan	China	Documentary		Released in 2019, it tells the story of a trans migrant worker named Li Ermao who "transitions from male to female, then back to male."	
Variações	João Maia	Portugal	Drama, Biography	Sérgio Praia, Victória Guerra, Filipe Duarte		
Velvet Buzzsaw	Dan Gilroy	United States	Horror	Jake Gyllenhaal, Rene Russo, Toni Collette, Daveed Diggs, Nitya Vidyasagar, Tom Sturridge, Natalia Dyer, Billy Magnussen, Mig Macario, John Malkovich		
Village of the Missing	Michael Del Monte	Canada	Documentary			
We Are the Radical Monarchs	Linda Goldstein Knowlton	United States	Documentary			
White Lie	Yonah Lewis and Calvin Thomas	Canada	Drama	Kacey Rohl, Amber Anderson, Martin Donovan		
Your Turn (Espero tua (re)volta)	Eliza Capai	Brazil	Documentary			
