= Dana Aliya Levinson =

Actor, writer, trans advocate

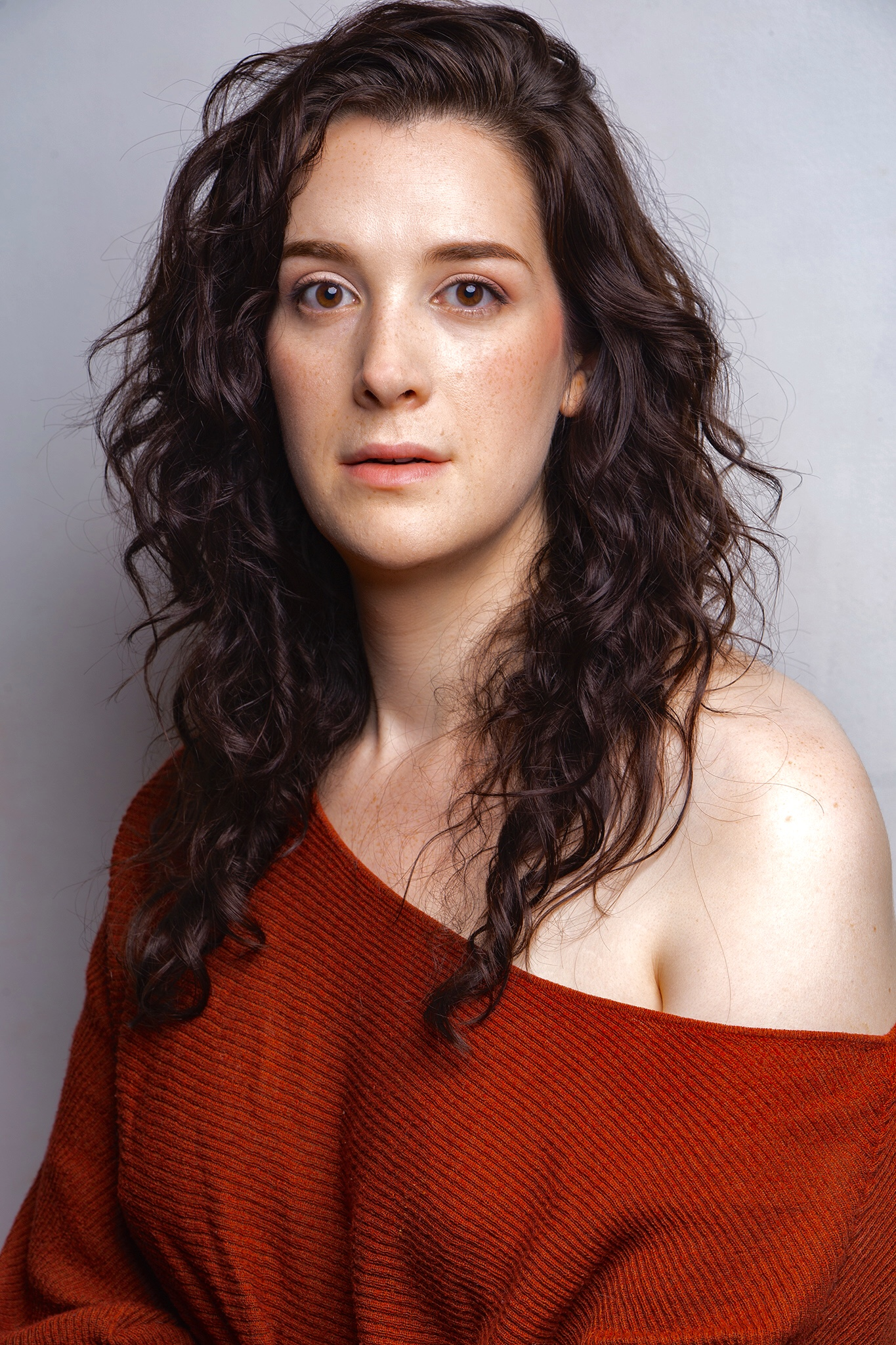

Dana Aliya Levinson (עברית: דנה עליה לוינסון), born in 1992, is a television writer, actress, and Jewish transgender advocate best known for her roles as Toni Rykener on the television series American Gods, Sadie Lipton in The Good Fight, and Hazel in the independent film Adam which had its world premiere at the 2019 Sundance Film Festival.

== Early life ==
Levinson was born in Great Neck, New York to father Lee Levinson, a dentist, and mother, Amy Levinson, a jewelry designer. She has two brothers, Daniel Levinson, who is a published author, and Michael Levinson, who is a comedian and writer. Levinson's maternal grandfather, Vic Cowen, was a comedy writer for Bob and Ray.

Levinson has spoken extensively about how her Jewishness and upbringing in a majority Jewish town has deeply affected her creative perspective and voice as a writer.

Levinson attended Great Neck South High School as well as The Village School. For undergraduate studies, she attended the New School.

== Professional life ==
Levinson studied music theory, composition, and piano, from a young age. While in undergrad, she began writing musical theater and corralling her fellow students into recording demos for her. Her first full-length musical as a composer and lyricist, 5th Republic, written with Stacey Weingarten, premiered at the New York Musical Festival (NYMF) in 2011 under the title Les Enfants de Paris. A demo recording of select songs from the show sung by Farah Siraj, Santino Fontana, Derek Klena, Laura Osnes, Alexander Gemignani, Kareem Youssef, Mariana Saba, and also the late Bassam Saba on Oud and Ney, was released online in 2014. Her second musical, MADAME, written with Stacey Weingarten and L Morgan Lee, was given a developmental reading at NYMF in 2012.

Levinson was selected as a 2014-2015 Dramatists Guild Fellow alongside her writing partner, Stacey Weingarten. There, she continued to develop both shows under the mentorship of Michael Korie. 5th Republic went on to have further development with the Musical Theater Factory, and Broadway au Carré in Paris, culminating in a concert version of the show at Comédie Nation featuring Lisandro Nesis, Maxime Guerville, Manon Taris, Kaïna Blada, Perle Solves, and Bastien Jacquemart as the show's leads.

Levinson also received an honorable mention for the inaugural Billie Burke Ziegfeld Award, which recognizes female musical theater writers.

Levinson wrote all of the musical arrangements, as well as collaborating with Stacey Weingarten on additional story, for the world premiere of LUDO's Broken Bride at NYMF, based on the band's concept album of the same name. The show had been previously developed as part of Ars Nova's ANTFest, as well as in a staged concert at The Cutting Room.

After years of only writing, Levinson began acting in 2017 with her first professional lead role, Grace, in the world premiere of the play Ballast by Georgette Kelly at Diversionary Theater in San Diego. This was soon followed by her role as Hazel, a trans lesbian political activist and girlfriend of Casey (played by Margaret Qualley), in the film Adam, directed by Rhys Ernst, and produced by Howard Gertler and James Schamus. Soon after, she landed the role of Toni Rykener, a trans woman demigoddess and protector of queer love, in the series American Gods on Starz. The episode garnered a Directors Guild of Canada Award for its director, Tim Southam. About the role, Levinson said:

There is something radical about a queer character being granted eternal life when the world does all it can to make sure we don't live on at all. To LGBTQ fans of American Gods, I love you and you too are sacred.

Levinson also appeared alongside Rob Reiner, Audra McDonald, Lorraine Toussaint, and Delroy Lindo in The Good Fight as Sadie Lipton, a trans woman swimmer who is attempting to qualify for the Olympics as well as the short films November 9, and The Dress You Have On, which premiered at OutFest in 2018. Levinson's writing efforts have also refocused toward film and television, and she has worked in developmental writer's rooms, most recently for ViacomCBS.

== Personal life ==
Levinson is a non-binary trans femme person and uses she and they pronouns.

Levinson is a big fan of the Harry Potter franchise. When its author, JK Rowling, posted a series of transphobic statements online, Levinson wrote an open letter to her which was published on The Huffington Post. This letter landed Levinson on season 5, episode 16 of the podcast Dan Fogler's 4D Experience, hosted by Dan Fogler who plays Jacob Kowalski in the Fantastic Beasts franchise. There, she discussed her experience with the Harry Potter series, as well as how Rowling's words were providing fodder for transphobic legislation that puts trans people's lives at risk.

== Short films ==
- November 9
- The Dress You Have On
