= James Schamus =

American filmmaker (born 1959)

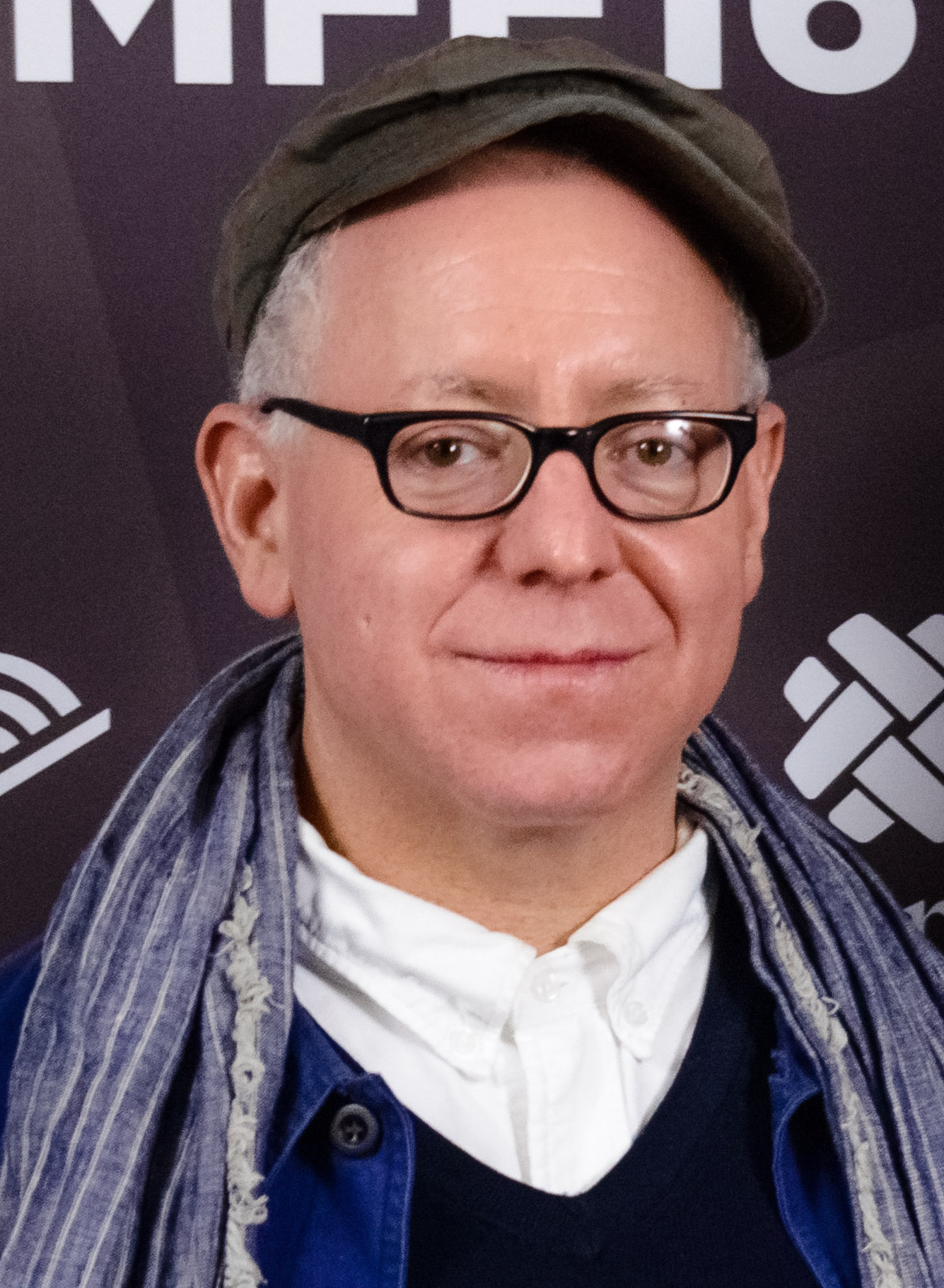
- Schamus in 2016
- Born: James Allan Schamus; September 7, 1959 (age 67); Detroit, Michigan, U.S.
- Education: University of California, Berkeley (BA, MA, PhD)
- Occupations: Producer; screenwriter; director
- Spouse: Nancy Kricorian
- Children: 2

James Allan Schamus (born September 7, 1959) is an American screenwriter, producer, business executive, film historian, professor, and director. He is a frequent collaborator of Ang Lee, the co-founder of the production company Good Machine, and the co-founder and former CEO of motion picture production, financing, and worldwide distribution company Focus Features, a subsidiary of NBCUniversal. He is currently president of the New York–based production company Symbolic Exchange, and is Professor of Professional Practice at Columbia University, where he has taught film history and theory since 1989.

== Life and career ==
Schamus was born in Detroit, Michigan, to a Jewish family. He is the son of Clarita (Gershowitz) Karlin and Julian John Schamus, and was raised in Los Angeles. He is married to writer Nancy Kricorian, with whom he has two children.

His output includes writing or co-writing The Ice Storm, Eat, Drink, Man, Woman, Crouching Tiger, Hidden Dragon and Hulk (all directed by Ang Lee), and producing Brokeback Mountain and Alone in Berlin. At Focus he oversaw the production and distribution of Lost in Translation, Milk, Eternal Sunshine of the Spotless Mind, Coraline, and The Kids Are All Right. In addition to his tenure at Columbia University, he has also taught at Yale University and at Rutgers University. He is the author of Carl Theodor Dreyer's Gertrud: The Moving Word, published by the University of Washington Press. He earned his BA, MA, and Ph.D. in English from University of California, Berkeley.

Schamus made his feature directorial debut with Indignation, an adaptation of Philip Roth's novel of the same name. Schamus also wrote the script for the film, which stars Logan Lerman, Sarah Gadon, and Tracy Letts, and is the story of a Jewish student at an Ohio college in 1951. The film premiered at the 2016 Sundance Film Festival, and was theatrically released by Roadside Attractions on July 29, 2016.

He was president of the jury for the 64th Berlin International Film Festival. He has also been on the jury of the New York International Children's Film Festival, and has served on the editorial boards of Film Quarterly and Cinema Journal, as well as on the board of Creative Capital and the Heyman Center for the Humanities. In 2016, Outfest established the James Schamus Ally Award to honor individuals who give prominence to LGBTQ narratives, with winners including James Franco, Rita Moreno, Sandra Oh, Octavia Spencer, Andra Day, Melissa McCarthy and Ben Falcone, and Shirley MacLaine.

He is a signatory of the Film Workers for Palestine boycott pledge that was published in September 2025.

== Filmography ==
Year	Title	Producer	Writer	Director	Notes
1990	The Golden Boat	Yes	No	Raúl Ruiz	
1991	Pushing Hands	Yes	Yes	Ang Lee	Also additional scenes
1991	Poison	Executive	No	Todd Haynes	
1991	Keep It For Yourself	Yes	No	Claire Denis	
1991	Angry	Yes	No	Nicole Holofcener	Short film
1991	Homage By Assassination	Yes	No	Elia Suleiman	
1991	Thank You and Good Night	Co-producer	No	Jan Oxenberg	Documentary
1991	I Was on Mars	Co-producer	No	Dani Levi	Also line producer
1991	Chicken Delight	Yes	No	Adam Isidore	Short film
1991	Warrior: The Life of Leonard Peltier	Executive	No	Suzie Baer	Documentary
1992	Swoon	Executive	No	Tom Kalin	
1992	Punch and Judy Get Divorced	Yes	No	David Gordon and Mark Pellington	
1992	Ambition	Yes	No	Hal Hartley	Short film
1992	Surviving Desire	Executive	No	Hal Hartley	
1992	In the Soup	Associate	No	Alexandre Rockwell	
1993	Terminal USA	Executive	No	Jon Moritsugu	
1993	Dottie Gets Spanked	Executive	No	Todd Haynes	Also line producer
1993	Night Ride	Executive	No	Andy Garrison	Also line producer
1993	The Secret Life of Houses	Executive	No	Adrian Velicescu	
1993	A Psychic Mom	Executive	No	Steve Busa	
1993	Love Potion	Executive	No	Ayoka Chenzira	
1993	Family Remains	Executive	No	Tamara Jenkins	
1993	The Wedding Banquet	Yes	Yes	Ang Lee	
1994	Eat Drink Man Woman	Associate	Yes	Ang Lee	
1994	Dark Waters	Yes	No	Kutluğ Ataman	
1994	Roy Cohn/Jack Smith	Yes	No	Jill Godmilow	
1994	What Happened Was	Executive	No	Tom Noonan	
1995	Sense and Sensibility	Co-producer	No	Ang Lee	
1995	Greetings from Africa	Yes	No	Cheryl Dunye	
1995	Safe	Executive	No	Todd Haynes	
1995	The Brothers McMullen	Executive	No	Edward Burns	
1996	She's the One	Yes	No	Edward Burns	
1996	Walking and Talking	Yes	No	Nicole Holofcener	
1997	Love God	Executive	No	Frank Grow	
1997	The Myth of Fingerprints	Executive	No	Bart Freundlich	
1997	Arresting Gena	Executive	No	Hannah Weyer	
1997	Wonderland	Executive	No	John O'Hagan	Documentary
1997	Office Killer	Executive	No	Cindy Sherman	
1997	The Ice Storm	Yes	Yes	Ang Lee	
1998	Happiness	Executive	No	Todd Solondz	
1999	Lola and Billy the Kid	Executive	No	Kutluğ Ataman	
1999	The Lifestyle	Executive	No	David Schisgall	Documentary
1999	Ride with the Devil	Yes	Yes	Ang Lee	
2000	Crouching Tiger, Hidden Dragon	Executive	Yes	Ang Lee	Also songwriter
2001	Buffalo Soldiers	Executive	No	Gregor Jordan	
2002	Auto Focus	Executive	No	Paul Schrader	
2003	Hulk	Yes	Yes	Ang Lee	
2005	Brokeback Mountain	Yes	No	Ang Lee	
2007	Lust, Caution	Yes	Yes	Ang Lee	Also songwriter
2009	Taking Woodstock	Yes	Yes	Ang Lee	
2014	That Film About Money	Yes	Yes	Himself	Short film
2015	Alone in Berlin	Yes	No	Vincent Perez	
2015	Suffragette	Executive	No	Sarah Gavron	
2015	Junction 48	Executive	No	Udi Aloni	
2016	Indignation	Yes	Yes	Himself	Directorial debut
2017	Casting JonBenet	Yes	No	Kitty Green	Documentary
2017	Dayveon	Executive	No	Amman Abasi	
2017	A Prayer Before Dawn	Executive	No	Jean-Stéphane Sauvaire	
2018	Benji	Executive	No	Brandon Camp	
2018	Furlough	Executive	No	Laurie Collyer	
2019	Adam	Yes	No	Rhys Ernst	
2019	The Tomorrow Man	Yes	No	Noble Jones	
2019	Driveways	Yes	No	Andrew Ahn	
2019	The Assistant	Yes	No	Kitty Green	
2019	Frames	Yes	Yes	Himself	Short film
2022	The King's Daughter	No	Yes	Sean McNamara	
2024	We Grown Now	Executive	No	Minhal Baig	
2024	McVeigh	Executive	No	Mike Ott	
2025	The Wedding Banquet	Yes	Yes	Andrew Ahn	
2026	The Boroughs	Consulting	Yes	Kyle Patrick Alvarez	TV series Episode: "The Grey Rebellion"

== Awards and nominations ==
Year	Title	Awards/Nominations
1997	The Ice Storm	Prix du Scénario (Best Screenplay Award); Nominated – BAFTA Award for Best Adapted Screenplay; Nominated – WGA Award for Best Adapted Screenplay
2000	Crouching Tiger, Hidden Dragon	Nominated – Academy Award for Best Adapted Screenplay; Nominated – Academy Award for Best Original Song; Nominated – BAFTA Award for Best Adapted Screenplay; Nominated – WGA Award for Best Adapted Screenplay Nominated – Grammy Award for Best Song Written for a Motion Picture, Television, or Other Visual Media
2005	Brokeback Mountain	BAFTA Award for Best Film; Golden Globe Award for Best Motion Picture – Drama; Independent Spirit Award for Best Film; Nominated – Academy Award for Best Picture
2007	Lust, Caution	Nominated – Golden Globe Award for Best Foreign Language Film
2016	Indignation	Nominated – Berlin International Film Festival Best First Feature Award

== Career recognition and honors ==
- Galway Film Festival Award for Outstanding Achievement, June 2019
- AACTA Award, Best Feature Length Documentary, "Casting JonBenet," December 2017 19th Annual GLAAD (Gay Lesbian Alliance Against Discrimination) Media Awards, Golden Gate Award, May 2008
- Golden Horse Award, Best Film, Best Screenplay Adaptation (James Schamus and Wang Hui-ling), "Lust, Caution," 2007
- Producers Guild of America, Darryl Zanuck Award for Producer of the Year, 2005
- Los Angeles Film Critics Association, Best Picture of the Year, "Brokeback Mountain," 2005
- New York Film Critics Circle, Best Picture, "Brokeback Mountain," 2005
- Out Magazine, Out 100 Award, 2005
- Grammy Award Nomination, Best Song Written For A Motion Picture, Television, Or Other Media, "A Love Before Time" from Crouching Tiger, Hidden Dragon, 2002
- Hugo Award, Best Dramatic Presentation for Crouching Tiger, Hidden Dragon, 2001
- The Philip and Ruth Hettleman Award, Columbia University School of General Studies, 1996
- Independent Spirit Brian Greenbaum Memorial Award for Producing, 1994

== Writing ==
=== Books ===
- Taking Woodstock. New York: Newmarket Press, 2009. Screenplay and Introduction.
- Carl Theodor Dryer's Gertrud: The Moving Word. Seattle: University of Washington Press, 2008.
- Lust, Caution. New York: Pantheon, 2007. Screenplay (with Wang Hui-Ling) and Introduction.
- The Hulk. New York: Newmarket Press, 2003. Screenplay and Introduction.
- Crouching Tiger, Hidden Dragon: Portrait of the Ang Lee Film. New York: Newmarket Press, 2000. Screenplay (with Wang Hui-Ling) and Notes.
- Ride With the Devil. London: Faber & Faber, 1999. Screenplay, Introduction, and Notes.
- The Ice Storm. New York: Newmarket Press, 1997. Screenplay, Introduction, and Notes.
- Two Films By Ang Lee: "Eat Drink Man Woman" and "The Wedding Banquet". New York: The Overlook Press, 1994. Introduction and Screenplays (with Ang Lee, Neal Peng, and Wang Hui-Ling).

=== Essays and articles ===
- "The 'Blurred Lines' of Columbia University's Task Force on Antisemitism", Mondoweiss, May 28, 2024.
- “Hollywood thinks it can divide and conquer the writers’ strike: It won’t work", The Guardian, May 5, 2023.
- “Rewriting Trauma: The Business of Storytelling in the Age of the Algorithm”, Literary Hub, December 12, 2018.
- “42 Directors Pick Their Favorite Movies of 2017", IndieWire, December 29, 2017.
- “Rise of the Machines: Cathy O’Neil and James Schamus on How Algorithms are Changing Society — and Filmmaking”, Filmmaker (magazine), September 14, 2017.
- "23 Fragments on the Future of Cinema", Filmmaker (magazine), Winter 2015.
- "Hollywood is Not American", The Hollywood Reporter, October 17, 2014.
- "James Schamus Reveals Secrets of the Oscar Voting System", Variety (magazine), January 8, 2014.
- "Raul Ruiz Remembered by James Schamus", Filmmaker (magazine), August 19, 2011.
- "The Apartment". The New York Times. November 4, 2007.
- "'Brokeback Mountain': An Exchange", The New York Review of Books, April 6, 2006.
- "Oy", Filmmaker, March 24, 2006.
- "Aesthetic Identities: A Response to Kenneth Chan and Christina Klein", Cinema Journal, Summer 2004, Volume 43, Number 4.
- "Sing to Us, Muse, of the Rage of the Hulk", The New York Times, May 11, 2003.
- "Talking Pictures", Filmmaker, Winter, 2001.
- "HOLIDAY FILMS; The Polyglot Task of Writing the Global Film", The New York Times, November 5, 2000.
- "IFP Rant", Filmmaker, Spring, 2000.
- "The Pursuit of Happiness: Making an Art of Marketing an Explosive Film", The Nation, April 5–12, 1999.
- "Long Live Indie Film", Filmmaker, Fall, 1995.

=== Profiles and interviews ===
- “This is Who We Are: James Schamus” Columbia University School of the Arts, December 1, 2023.
- “Hollywood On Strike!” Film Quarterly Webinar, 4 August 2023.
- “Writers Strikes Throughout History” Let’s Talk Film podcast, Woodstock Film Festival, July 13, 2023.
- “In the Footsteps of Giants: James Schamus - A Banquet of Inclusion,” Produced By: The Official Magazine of the Producers Guild of America, June/July 2023, p. 62.
- “The Ice Storm: Interview with James Schamus and Ted Hope,” Hollywood Gold Podcast, March 1, 2023.
- “Entertainment Educators of the Year: Entertainment Educators Discuss Teaching Cinema’s Next Gen and the Importance of Diverse and Impactful Storytellers” Variety, April 28, 2022.
- "The Aesthetics of Cinema: Interview with James Schamus" Gadfly Magazine, March 1, 2021.
- "James Schamus: financial models of SVoD giants cannot be sustained" Screen Daily, October 12, 2020.
- "James Schamus' New Short Film Explains the 124-Year-Old History of Cinema in 3 Minutes" Indiewire, November 27, 2019.
- “Filmmaker James Schamus Slams ‘Predator’ Harvey Weinstein and His ‘Factory of Abuse" The Hollywood Reporter, October 11, 2017
- “Berlin: Kitty Green and James Schamus on doc Casting JonBenet” Screen Daily, February 14, 2017.
- “James Schamus Interview: There are Two Kinds of Asshole Directors” Independent, November 15, 2016.
- “Ang Lee, James Schamus, and Sony Pictures Classics’ Michael Barker Reminisce About Crouching Tiger, Hidden Dragon” The Playlist, October 20, 2016.
- “Interview: James Schamus (Indignation)” OnWriting, WGA East, September 13, 2016.
- "Indignation director James Schamus: Film is Dead, And That's Okay" Indiewire. August 1, 2016.
- "Indignation Interview" Indiewire. February, 2016.
- "James Schamus Directing Debut Indignation Wins Over Sundance Audience" The Wrap. January 24, 2016.
- "Indignation: Sundance Review" The Hollywood Reporter. January 25, 2016.
- "Accidental CEO The College. Summer 2014.
- "Case Study: James Schamus", Produced By. October 2014.
- "James Schamus: 'The job is an ego crushing ass-kick to the soul. I love it!'", The Guardian. January 28, 2014.
- "On James Schamus and Focus Features", Filmmaker. October 3, 2013.
- "The Professor of Micropopularity", The New York Times. November 26, 2010.
- "Ang Lee + James Schamus: A Pinewood Dialogue", Museum of the Moving Image. November 9, 2007.
- "The Professor in the Back Lot", The New York Times. September 17, 2006.
- "A Conversation with Tony Kushner," On Writing (Writers Guild of America, East): New York. Fall, 2005.
