= Ayça Varlıer =

Turkish actress and singer (born 1977)

- Born: Ayça Elif Varlıer; 7 May 1977 (age 48); Ankara, Turkey
- Genres: Pop; jazz; funk; musical
- Occupations: Actor; singer; composer; TV presenter
- Years active: 1998–present
- Labels: TMC

Ayça Elif Varlıer (born 7 May 1977) is a Turkish actress, singer, composer and TV presenter.

Born in 1977 in Ankara, while she was going to high school she moved to the United States and finished her education there. She later graduated from University of Hartford Hartt School. She worked in a number of plays during her time in the US and returned to Turkey in 2000. In 2004, she got her first television role in Karım ve Annem. Her breakthrough came in 2005 with her role in Gümüş. In 2007, she got a leading role in the play Hisseli Harikalar Kumpanyası. She had her first leading role on TV in Son Bahar (2008). In 2010, for her role in the musical Leyla'nın Evi she won an Afife Theater Award, a Sadri Alışık Award and a Vasfi Rıza Zobu Theater Award. In 2013, her first studio album Elif was released. In the following years she got main roles in the movies Taş Mektep (2013), Günce (2013), Olur Olur (2014) and Mavi Gece (2015). In 2015, for her performance in the play Fosforlu'nun Hikayesi she won another Sadri Alışık Award. As of 2017, Varlıer stars in the TV series Kalk Gidelim.

== Early life and education ==
Varlıer was born on 7 May 1977 in Ankara as the second daughter of ballerina Duygu Varlıer and economist Oktay Varlıer. She has an older sister named Aslı. While at the second year of high school, she went to New Jersey as part of a student exchange program. After graduating from high school, she studied musical theater at University of Hartford Hartt School. Later she participated in a mutual program between Harvard University and Moscow Art Theatre School and studied acting for 4 months in Moscow.

== Career ==
=== 1998–2004: Early works ===
By the end of her studies, she was chosen by The Acting Company to work in a number of theater plays. Spring Awakening, Cher Molière, Man of La Mancha, Carnival, Guys and Dolls, Working, 42nd St., Henry IV, Battleship Potemkin and Virgin Trunk were among the musicals and plays in which she played a role. After September 11 attacks her visa was not renewed and she returned to Turkey. Following her return, she accompanied pianist Fahir Atakoğlu as a soloist. In 2004, she made her television debut with Kanal D's series Karım ve Annem as Doctor Buket.

=== 2005–2010: Rise to fame and first leading roles ===
From January 2005 to June 2007 she portrayed the character of Pınar in Kanal D's series Gümüş. Due to the series popularity in the Arab World, she became a familiar name in the households. On 15 February 2005, she had portrayed the character of Anita in Leonard Bernstein's musical West Side Story, which was directed by Altan Günbay. In 2005, she portrayed Cinderella in an episode of Anlat İstanbul and also starred as Evrim in the movie O Şimdi Mahkum. In 2007, she portrayed Burcu in Turkmax's TV film Havva Durumu. She appeared on stage on 26 June 2007 in Haldun Dormen's musical Hisseli Harikalar Kumpanyası and played the character of Süheyla. On 13 August 2007, she appeared on stage again at Cemil Topuzlu Open-Air Theatre in the rock musical Rock Müzikaller. In 2008, she portrayed the character of Doctor Neşe in the second season of Show TV's Kurtlar Vadisi Pusu; during the same period, from March to June 2008, she played as Gizem in ATV's series Limon Ağacı. In August 2008, together with her family she found the WAMP management, organization and designing company.

In September 2008, she got her first leading role in TV as Sabiha Yılmaz in Star TV's Son Bahar. She played opposite Erkan Petekkaya and the series finished in October 2008. From 2009 to 2010, she portrayed the character of Doctor Hayat in a number of episodes of Kanal D's Geniş Aile. On 24 March 2010, she portrayed the character of an ill person with MS in Haldun Durmen's play Sil Baştan.

=== 2010–2014: First studio album ===
On 6 May 2010, she started appearing on stage at Tiyatrokare as Roxy in the musical Leyla'nın Evi, based on Zülfü Livaneli's novel of the same name and directed by Nedim Saban. For her performance in this musical; on 21 March 2011, she won the Best Comedy and Musical Actress award at the 15th Afife Theater Awards. On 25 April 2011, she won the Best Actress award at the 16th Sadri Alışık Award, followed by another award at the Vasfı Rıza Zobu Theater Awards ceremony. She later got a role in Engin Alkan's musical Hekate'nin Şarkısı, which was organized by Istanbul City Theatres and first went on stage on 10 May 2010 at the 17th International Istanbul Theater Festival. She later recorded the song "Bir Zaman Hatası" for Emir Ersoy & Projecto Cubano's compilation album Yaşama Bir Şans Ver, which was released by Soulfulworks Records on 6 August 2010.

From 2010 to 2011, she portrayed the character of Bahar in a number of episodes of Star TV's Behzat Ç. Bir Ankara Polisiyesi. From January to April 2012, she played opposite Bülent Emin Yarar as Buket in Star TV's series Kalbim 4 Mevsim. She later recorded the song "Sil Baştan" for Emir Ersoy & Projecto Cubano's new compilation album Karnaval which was released by TMC on 12 May 2012. On 6 February 2013, her first studio album Elif was released by TMC. The album contained 8 songs, 5 of which were composed by herself.

From February to April 2014 she portrayed the character of Yıldız Gökçener in Kanal D's Zeytin Tepesi. At the same year, she starred as Azra in Kerem Çakıroğlu's movie Olur Olur!. The following year, he played the role of Doctor Emel in Ahmet Hoşsöyler's Mavi Gece, a fantasy comedy movie in which she starred opposite Fırat Tanış. In 2015, she participated in a project for Hope Foundation for Children with Cancer and read Emre Kalcı's poet "Anlama Hâli" on the song "Zamansız", which was performed by Işın Karaca and included in the album Emre Kalcı Şiirleriyle... Aşkın On Hâli. It was released by DMC on 2 June 2015.

=== 2015–present ===
In 2015, she portrayed the character of Fosforlu Cevriye in the musical Fosforlu'nun Hikayesi, based on Suat Derviş's novel Fosforlu Cevriye and directed by Serkan Üstüner. It was organized by Tuncer Cücenoğlu and went on stage at Tiyatrokare on 12 September 2015. For her performance, she won the Best Comedy and Musical Actress at the 21st Sadri Alışık Theater and Cinema Awards on 2 May 2016. From March to June 2016, she starred as Leyla Bozoğlu in ATV's series Kehribar. At the same year, she appeared as Ayla Öker in one episode of Mordkommission Istanbul, which aired on Das Erste in Germany. On Valentine's Day 2017, she released a music video for her song "Hoşçakal" on YouTube, which was written by herself. She later made a guest appearance in Kanal D's Hayat Şarkısı as the character Mahsa. On 24 April 2017, she presented the 21st Afife Theater Awards at Haliç Congress Center.

Since November 2017, she has been starring in TRT 1's series Kalk Gidelim as Nurcan Dal. She also appeared as Zühre, in the musical Tahir ile Zühre, which was directed by Onur Turan and written by Şefik Onat. The show first went on stage on 19 December 2017.

== Personal life ==
She has an older sister named Aslı Varlıer Pelit. Varlıer lives with her family in a villa in Beykoz, Istanbul.

== Theater ==
Date	Title	Role	Notes
	Spring Awakening	Fanny Gabor	
	Cher Molière	Elmire	
	Man of La Mancha	Aldonza/Dulcinea	
	Carnival		
	Guys and Dolls		
	Working		Musical
	42. St.		
	Enrico IV		
	Battleship Potemkin		
	Virgin Trunk		
15 February 2005	West Side Story	Anita	Musical
13 August 2007	Rock Müzikaller		Tek gösterimlik müzikal
26 June 2007	Hisseli Harikalar Kumpanyası	Süheyla	Musical
6 May 2010	Leyla'nın Evi	Roxy	Müzikal
10 May 2010	Hekate'nin Şarkısı		Musical
24 March 2010	Sil Baştan		Play
12 September 2015	Fosforlu'nun Hikayesi	Fosforlu Cevriye	
19 December 2017	Tahir ile Zühre	Zühre	Musical

== Filmography ==
Year	Title	Role	Notes
2004	Karım ve Annem	Doctor Buket	TV series
2004	Anlat İstanbul	Cinderella	
2005	O Şimdi Mahkum	Evrim	
2005–2007	Gümüş	Pınar	TV series
2007	Havva Durumu	Burcu	TV film
2008	Kurtlar Vadisi Pusu	Doctor Neşe	TV series, 2nd season
2008	Limon Ağacı	Gizem	TV series
2008–2009	Son Bahar	Sabiha Yılmaz	TV series
2009–2010	Geniş Aile	Doctor Hayat	TV series
2010–2011	Behzat Ç. Bir Ankara Polisiyesi	Bahar	TV series
2012	Kalbim 4 Mevsim	Buket	TV series
2013	Taş Mektep	Güzide	
2013	Günce	Melike	
2014	Zeytin Tepesi	Yıldız Gökçener	TV series
2014	Olur Olur!	Azra	
2015	Mavi Gece	Emel	
2016	Kehribar	Leyla Bozoğlu	TV series
2016	Mordkommission Istanbul	Ayla Öker	TV series, 1st episode
2017	Hayat Şarkısı	Mahsa	TV series
2017–2020	Kalk Gidelim	Nurcan Dal	TV series
2021	Menajerimi Ara	Herself	TV series

== Discography ==
Studio album

- Elif (2013, TMC)

Single

- "Hoşçakal" (2017)

As featured artist

- Yaşama Bir Şans Ver (2010, Emir Ersoy & Projecto Cubano, Soulfulworks Records)
- Karnaval (2012, Emir Ersoy & Projecto Cubano, TMC)
- Emre Kalcı Şiirleriyle... Aşkın On Hâli (2015, DMC)
