= Selen Uçer =

Turkish actress

- Born: Leyla Selen Uçer; 5 May 1973 (age 53); Turkey
- Education: Boğaziçi University
- Occupation: Actress

Leyla Selen Uçer (born 5 May 1973) is a Turkish actress, best known for her role in the movie Ara and the play Bug.

== Life and career ==
Uçer's parents were chemical engineers. She studied at St. George's Austrian High School and graduated from Boğaziçi University with a degree in chemistry. During her university years, she joined the Boğaziçi University acting club. She also attended the Istanbul University State Conservatory Singing Department. She studied at the Academy Istanbul with a scholarship for a year. She also completed her master's degree at Roosevelt University in Chicago with a scholarship. The play she wrote, American Dream, was staged by Ensemble Theater on Off-Broadway.

Upon returning to Turkey, she was cast in the movie Anlat İstanbul, written by Ümit Ünal, in 2004. She also appeared in Külkedisi, directed by Selim Demirdelen. She then took part in DOT's adaptation of Bug. With her performance in Haldun Dormen's Kantocu at Istanbul City Theatres, she was nominated for the Best Supporting Actress in a Musical or Comedy award at the Afife Jale Awards. She had a leading role in the 2007 movie Ara, directed by Ümit Ünal, portraying the character of Gül. For this role, she shared the Best Actress award at the 15th International Adana Film Festival with Ayça Damgacı. In 2008, she appeared as a prostitute in O... Çocukları. In 2009, she played the role of Emel in Binbir Gece. In the same year, she was cast in Hanımın Çiftliği as Asuman. In 2019, with her role in Ümit Ünal's Aşk, Büyü, vs., she won the Golden Orange Award for Best Actress.

== Awards ==
- 39th International Istanbul Film Festival: "Best Actress" - Aşk Büyü vs. - 2020
- 15th Afife Theatre Awards: "Best Supporting Actress in a Musical/Comedy" - Cam, Aysa Production Theatre - 2011
- 21st Ankara International Film Festival: "Best Supporting Actress" - 2010
- 15th Adana Golden Boll Film Festival: "Best Actress" - Ara - 2008
- 20th Sadri Alışık Theatre and Cinema Awards: "Best Theatre Actress in a Supporting Role" (Comedy or Musical) - Kurusıkı, BKM

== Theatre ==
- Kurusıkı : Levent Kazak - 2014
- Kuçu Kuçu : Fabrice Roger-Lacan - Aysa Production Theatre - 2012
- The New Tenant : Eugène Ionesco - Bi Theatre - 2012
- Cam : Levent Kazak - Aysa Production Theatre - 2010
- Bug : Tracy Letts - DOT - 2005
- Kantocu : Haldun Dormen - Istanbul City Theatres - 2005

== Filmography ==
- Bir Derdim Var (2023)
- Oregon - Şermin (2023)
- Kara Tahta - Münevver (2022)
- Dilberay (2022)
- Leyla ile Mecnun - Feraye (2021)
- Evlilik Hakkında Her Şey - Songül (2021–2022)
- Masumiyet - Yelda Demirci (2021)
- Menajerimi Ara (2020)
- Love, Spells and All That (Aşk, Büyü vs.) - Ümit Ünal (2019)
- Leke - Serpil Zengin (2019)
- Koca Koca Yalanlar - Nilgün (2018)
- Altınsoylar - Şaziye (2016)
- Beni Böyle Sev - Eda (2013–2015)
- İffet : Faruk Teber - Gülin
- Hanımın Çiftliği : Faruk Teber - Asuman
- Deli Saraylı : Tarkan Karlıdağ - Servant Kiraz
- Büyük Oyun : Atıl İnanç - Amira
- Kıskanmak : Zeki Demirkubuz
- 11'e 10 Kala : Pelin Esmer - Mahinur
- Bornova Bornova : İnan Temelkuran - Senem
- Kahve Bahane : Deniz
- Ses : Ümit Ünal
- Binbir Gece : Kudret Sabancı - Emel
- O... Çocukları : Murat Saraçoğlu - Selvi
- Düğün Şarkıcısı : Burcu
- Zincirbozan : Atıl İnanç - Aynur
- Dicle :
- Ara : Ümit Ünal - Gül
- Fedai : Gülşen
- Karınca Yuvası : Zerrin
- Anlat İstanbul : Selim Demirdelen - Rahşan
- Bir İstanbul Masalı : Ömür Atay
- Böyle Bitmesin (guest appearance)
