= Ara (film) =

- Promotional poster for Ara
- Directed by: Ümit Ünal
- Written by: Ümit Ünal
- Produced by: Ümit Ünal; Mustafa Uslu
- Starring: Erdem Akakçe; Betül Çobanoğlu; Serhat Tutumluer; Selen Uçer
- Cinematography: Gökhan Atılmış
- Edited by: Çiçek Kahraman
- Music by: Özgür Yılmaz (musician)
- Distributed by: Bir Film
- Release date: March 21, 2008
- Running time: 89 minutes
- Country: Turkey
- Language: Turkish

Ara is a 2008 Turkish drama film directed by Ümit Ünal, starring Erdem Akakçe, Betül Çobanoğlu, Serhat Tutumluer, and Selen Uçer, all originally stage actors.

The film's plot spans a decade and evolves around the relations of two middle class, urban couples, Veli and Selda, Veli's business partner Ender and Gül. Selda is romantically and sexually involved with Ender, while Gül and Veli are also in an extramarital relationship. The film examines Turkey's financial and cultural turmoils of the past 20 years through these four middle-class people who search for their own places and stances in society, and through their romantic, friendly and treacherous relations.

The film is set in a single apartment, however, because the plot spans a decade, and the apartment is used as a set for music videos, commercials or TV serials, those images seep into the film's imagery while the decoration of the house continuously changes throughout. The film was shot completely digitally in an 80 square meter (861 square feet) flat at the Kuledibi neighbourhood in Beyoğlu, Istanbul. The film's title "Ara" means "between", "space", "distance" in Turkish, and it is a reference to the main characters' "in between-ness" in society and their own relationships.

== Plot ==
Ara tells the story of two couples over a period of about 10 years. The men are close friends, and so are their partners, thanks to them. One of the women, Gül, is half French half Turkish living in Istanbul. She rents her house to film crews to shoot commercials, movies, TV series and music videos. When the homes of her friends Ender, Veli, and Selda, are flooded, they also stay in her flat. The film follows these four friends living in this house from 1998 until 2008.

== Production ==
=== Script ===
Writer-director Ümit Ünal was expected to shoot Sultan Mutfakta after he completed Istanbul Tales, but preferred to make Ara instead for budgetary reasons. Ünal constructed the script especially for two actors, who both turned the offer down. The script was completed in the summer of 2006.

Ünal first came up with the idea of making a film on relations at a single setting, in one house, after moving out from his home where he lived with his ex-wife. According to Ünal, the script has autobiographical elements, "but rather the autobiography of a generation that is in its 40s now." Ünal also was inspired by English playwright Harold Pinter's 1978 play Betrayal that deals with an affair that entangles a married couple. The Ender character corresponds to the director Ümit Ünal, if he had studied Economics, instead of Fine Arts.

=== Shooting and editing ===
Shooting began on May 10, 2007, and both shooting and editing were completed in only 13 days, due to the being done on a daily basis as the shooting went on (a standard feature film usually takes from one month up to a year for the editing to be completed).

== Reception ==
Ara was generally well received by critics in Turkey, however audience numbers were quite low compared to blockbusters (9,332 in 13 weeks as opposed to 102,900 by The Bank Job in 17 weeks). The film was released in 18 theaters, most of them art house cinemas. At the 2008 Istanbul International Film Festival, Ara received the Special Prize of the Jury in the National Competition and Serhat Tutumluer won the Best Actor Award.

== Controversy ==
A controversy arose when Ara was not selected to compete at the 44th Antalya Golden Orange Film Festival. Ümit Ünal sent a public letter to the festival director Engin Yiğitgil protesting that Ara was eliminated as contender by a pre-jury whose members were not revealed, and without a rationale. Ünal added that he will not have any of his future films screened at Antalya as long as the current festival structure is maintained. Ünal also turned to the Turkish film organisations Scriptwriters' Association and Film Works Owners' Association. On September 30, 2007, another director, Ali Özgentürk, in support of Ünal, accused the festival as being undemocratic and that Golden Orange "has been using Turkish cinema as an extra for the last few years. Directors Engin Ayça, whose Suna, Selma Köksal, whose Fikret Bey, and Mehmet Eryılmaz, whose A Fairground Attraction were not nominated, also protested and accused the festival for not showing the necessary attention to Turkish cinema. The Golden Orange Film Festival administration did not reveal the reasons for Ara not being included in its competition, how many films applied to the competition of how many were eliminated.
