= Menajerimi Ara =

Turkish television series

- Genre: Comedy drama
- Based on: Call My Agent!
- Written by: Yelda Eroğlu (1–7); Yeşim Çıtak (1–7); Emine Yıldırım (3–7); Ekin Atalar (8–34); Sema Ergenekon (35–41); Uğraş Güneş (35–45)
- Directed by: Ali Bilgin (1–9); Deniz Çelebi Dikilitaş (10–45)
- Starring: Barış Falay; Canan Ergüder; Fatih Artman; Serhat Teoman; Ahsen Eroğlu; Deniz Can Aktaş; Ayşenil Şamlıoğlu; Özge Borak
- Theme music composer: Uğur Ateş, Saki Çimen
- Composers: Saki Çimen; Uğur Ateş
- Country of origin: Turkey
- Original language: Turkish
- No. of seasons: 1
- No. of episodes: 45

Production
- Producer: Kerem Çatay
- Production location: Istanbul
- Running time: 150 minutes
- Production company: Ay Yapım

Original release
- Network: Star TV
- Release: 25 August 2020 – 11 July 2021

Menajerimi Ara (transl. "Call My Manager") is a Turkish comedy drama television series signed by Ay Yapım, directed by Deniz Çelebi Dikilitaş, script written by Uğraş Güneş and Volkan Yazıcı, first episode aired on 25 August 2020. Blending drama and comedy, the series centers around the lives of four managers with their assistants at a prestigious talent agency. With each episode, actors from the cinema and television industry participate in the series as guests and portray themselves. Adapted from the French TV series Dix pour cent. The series ended with its 45th episode, which was broadcast on July 11, 2021.

== Plot ==
Four managers of talent agency Ego, namely Kıraç (Barış Falay), Feris (Canan Ergüder), Çınar (Fatih Artman) and Peride (Ayşenil Şamlıoğlu), deal with difficult situations and defend their business visions. They combine art and business, and their private and professional lives sometimes come into conflict. The managers and their assistants are shown working in the world of famous actors, where laughter, emotions, intrigue, disappointment and tears collide. Dicle (Ahsen Eroğlu), Kıraç's neglected daughter, enters this world, starting as Feris's assistant in her struggle against personalities with large egos.

== Shots ==
While the building where the imaginary talent agency EGO is located is 42 Plaza (Note: 1st and 2nd episode series footage) in Istanbul - Maslak, the house where the Dicle character stayed for the first 3 episodes is in the Kurtuluş district of Şişli district. Some of the interior shots took place at the Beykoz Shoe Factory.

== Cast and characters ==
- Kıraç Özdal (Barış Falay): One of the managers of EGO and Dicle's father. (1-45)
- Çınar Bilgin (Fatih Artman): One of the managers of EGO. (1-45)
- Dicle Ertem (Ahsen Eroğlu): Feris's assistant and Kıraç's Daughter. (1-45)
- Barış Havas (Deniz Can Aktaş): One of the actors that Feris manages, and later Dicle's boyfriend. (1-45)
- Peride Şener (Ayşenil Şamlıoğlu): One of the managers of EGO. (1-45)
- Feris Dikmen (Canan Ergüder): One of the managers of EGO. She is self-confident and has a tough personality. Dicle's boss. She went to the US for 6 months with Serkan. (1–45)
- Serkan Tahtacı (Serhat Teoman): Former EGO Agency manager who returned home from the USA. Owner of Berlin Agency. He and Kıraç can't get along. Later, he buys EGO Agency from Mayda's father and decides to merge the two agencies. He returned to the US with Feris. (12–45)
- Ceyda Yücesoy (Özge Borak): Serkan's old friend. EGO's partner and later new owner. A manipulative and pretentious person who often resorts to dirty and dishonest tactics, she's not liked by anyone at EGO. (29-45)
- Gulin Yetik (Gamze Karaduman): Kıraç's assistant. (1-45)
- Emrah Ayoglu (Semi Sirtikkizil): Çinar's assistant. (1-45)
- Aydin Havas (Beran Kotan): Barış's brother. (1-45)
- Beren Özdal (Yaprak Medine): Kıraç's step daughter, Mayda's daughter and Barış's co-star and asumed girlfriend among the media. At first friendly with Dicle, she turns into her enemy after learning that she's Kıraç's daughter and for her relationship with Barış, trying to sabotage and incriminate Dicle on several occasions. (1-45)
- Jülide Tirmik (Nazli Senem Ünal) (1-45)

=== Guest artists ===
The artists listed below have appeared in one episode in which they portrayed themselves or fictional characters.

Actor	Episode	Year
Alican Yücesoy	1	2020
Tuba Büyüküstün	1	2020
Ali Bilgin	2	2020
Nebahat Çehre	2	2020
Nükhet Duru	2	2020
Melisa Damla Öykü	2	2020
Orhan Deniz	2	2020
Ceylan Özgün Özçelik	3	2020
Çağatay Ulusoy	3	2020
Derya Baykal	3	2020
Müjgan Ferhan Şensoy	3	2020
Ercan Kesal	3	2020
Edis	4	2020
Melisa Şenolsun	4	2020
Demet Akbağ	4	2020
İrem Derici	5	2020
Şükran Ovalı	5	2020
Mesut Can Tomay	5	2020
Ali Biçim	5	2020
Rıza Kocaoğlu	6	2020
Boran Kuzum	6	2020
Gökçe Bahadır	7	2020
Ahmet Rıfat Şungar	7	2020
Burçin Terzioğlu	8	2020
Hazal Kaya	8	2020
Bilge Şen	8	2020
Feyyaz Yiğit	9	2020
Ali Yoğurtçuoğlu	9	2020
İlkin Tüfekçi	9	2020
Sadi Celil Cengiz	10	2020
Aslı İnandık	11	2020
Arif Erkin Güzelbeyoğlu	11	2020
Pınar Deniz	12	2020
Arif Erkin Güzelbeyoğlu	12	2020
Yılmaz Gruda	12	2020
Tilbe Saran (Sabiha)	12	2020
İrem Derici	13	2020
Ozan Dolunay	14	2020
Murat Dalkılıç	15	2020
Selen Uçer	15	2020
Melis Birkan	16	2020
Ushan Çakır	16	2020
Yetkin Dikinciler	17	2020
Erhan Yazıcıoğlu	17	2020
Hayrettin Karaoğuz	17	
Bora Akkaş	18	
Tuğba Çom Makar	19	2021
Perihan Savaş	19	2021
Perihan Savaş	20	2021
Tamer Levent	21	2021
Ege Kökenli	21	2021
Şerif Erol	22	2021
Gülben Ergen	23	2021
Serdar Ortaç	23	2021
Ece Dizdar	23	2021
Aslı Tandoğan	24	2021
Başak Karahan	24	2021
Serdar Ortaç	25	2021
Almila Ada	25	2021
İrem Derici	26	2021
Kalben	26	2021
Levent Ülgen	27	2021
Yaşar Üzer	27	2021
Şenay Gürler	28	2021
İbrahim Kutluay	28	2021
Sedef Avcı	29	2021
Defne Kayalar	30	2021
Aydan Şener	31	2021
Serdar Ortaç	31	2021
Rahmi Dilligil	31	2021
Selda Alkor	32	2021
Tugay Mercan	32	2021
Ayça Varlıer	33	2021
Yağmur Tanrısevsin	33	2021
Ceren Taşçı	34	2021
Devin Özgür Çınar	35	2021
Zeynep Köse	35	2021
Kemal Başar	35	2021
Burcu Altın	36	2021
Bala Atabek	36	2021
Onur Büyüktopçu	37	2021
Ruhi Sarı (Erdem)	37	2021
Çağrı Çıtanak (Murat)	37	2021
Erdem Akakçe (Alper)	37	2021
Gülden Avşaroğlu	37	2021
Ayça Ayşin Turan	38	2021
Alp Navruz	38	2021
Beyti Engin	38	2021
Mustafa Kırantepe	39	2021
Nihan Büyükağaç (Didem)	39	2021
Fatih Al (Timur)	39	2021
Defne Yalnız	40	2021
Serkan Tınmaz (Görkem)	40	2021
Burak Altay (Fırat)	40	2021
Fatih Ürek	41	2021
Gürgen Öz	42	2021
Bahtiyar Engin	42	2021
Sinem Öztürk	42	2021
Cem Belevi	43	2021
Nursel Köse	43	2021
Mehmet Esen	43	2021
Murat Dalkılıç	44	2021
Yasemin Allen	44	2021
Emre Bey	45	2021

== International broadcasting ==
Call My Agent gained a lot of popularity among Turkic countries (especially in Azerbaijan), Iran (especially Iranian Azerbaijan), Balkans, Latin America (especially Colombia and Argentina), and Pakistan where it has been a complete success, and Arab countries.

Country	Network	Local title	Series premiere	Timeslot
Chile	Mega	Llama a Mi Agente	20 April 2024	22:30; 23:30
United States	Pasiones TV	Llama a Mi Agente	6 February 2024	19:00pm
Argentina	TNT	La Agencia	12 December 2023	22:30
Colombia	Caracol TV	Llama a Mi Agente	28 May 2024	15:30
Peru	Latina televisión	La Agencia	soon (2024)
