= 9 (2002 film) =

- Directed by: Ümit Ünal
- Starring: Ali Poyrazoğlu; Cezmi Baskın
- Release date: 15 November 2002 (Turkey)
- Running time: 1h 31min
- Country: Turkey
- Language: Turkish

9 is a 2002 Turkish crime film directed by Ümit Ünal. The film was Turkey's official submission for the Academy Award for Best Foreign Language Film at the 76th Academy Awards, but it was not nominated.

== Cast ==
- Ali Poyrazoğlu - Firuz
- Cezmi Baskın - Salim
- Serra Yılmaz - Saliha
- Fikret Kuşkan - Tunç
- Ozan Güven - Kaya
- Esin Pervane - Kirpi (Spiky)

== See also ==
- List of submissions to the 76th Academy Awards for Best Foreign Language Film
- List of Turkish submissions for the Academy Award for Best Foreign Language Film
