= The Voice (2010 film) =

- Theatrical poster
- Directed by: Ümit Ünal
- Written by: Uygar Şirin
- Produced by: Ersan Çongar
- Starring: Selma Ergeç; Mehmet Günsur; Işık Yenersu; Eylem Yıldız; Serra Yılmaz
- Cinematography: Türksoy Gölebey
- Edited by: Cicek Kahraman; Natalin Solakoglu
- Music by: Mehmet Cem Unal
- Production company: Bir Film
- Distributed by: Tiglon Film
- Release date: March 5, 2010
- Country: Turkey
- Language: Turkish
- Box office: $235,316

The Voice (Turkish: Ses) is a 2010 Turkish horror film, directed by Ümit Ünal, about a young woman who begins to hear a strange voice whispering to her. The film opened on nationwide general release across Turkey on March 5, 2010.

== Plot ==
Derya (Selma Ergeç) works in a bank's call centers to support her elderly mother. One day her life is suddenly turned upside down as she begins to hear a strange voice whispering to her. The source of the voice is a mystery and it tells her things and facts no one else would know. Word gets out, and many in the community start to believe she is receiving messages from the divine. But soon the voice starts to become louder and louder, its tone becomes more and more threatening and Derya's life starts spiraling into a nightmare.

== Cast ==
- Selma Ergeç – Derya
- Mehmet Günsür – Onur
- Isık Yenersu – Aysel
- Eylem Yıldız – Filiz
- Selen Uçer – Ses
- Serra Yılmaz – Cahide
- Hakan Karahan – Sait
- Emre Akay – Sinan
- Levent Yılmaz – Fotografci
- Köksal Yılmaz – Taner

== Production ==
Director Ümit Ünal explained his surprise decision to collaborate with film-critic and novelist Uygar Şirin on this film by stating that, “The script is the best I’ve seen.”

The film was shot on location in Istanbul, Turkey.

== Release ==
The film opened in 77 screens across Turkey on February 12, 2010 at number eleven in the Turkish box office chart with an opening weekend gross of $92,751.

== Reception ==
=== Box office ===
The movie has made a total gross of $235,316.

=== Reviews ===
Emine Yıldırım, writing for Today's Zaman, states, Surely the film does not present anything new to the genre, but it at least does not smell like a rotten Hollywood rip-off thanks to its spatter of local motifs and cultural references without the usual misogyny of female torture. The strong and weak points of “Ses” seem to stem from the same place -- its high regard for illustrating an intelligent and psychological thriller of depth where the expected scares serve the purpose of the main human story of dysfunctional and traumatized families -- yet the scenes which specifically highlight the drama and not the suspense tend to perform weakly as the emotional dynamic between the characters could have been more engaging, the reviewer adds, before going on to state, For the most part, the film’s real theme (which cannot be revealed at this point for spoilers) is so familiar to Turkish culture that it achieves in portraying a remarkable zeitgeist that no other films of related genres have been able to present. The reviewer concludes, All things considered, Ünal brings a well-crafted tale of agony (the kind of agony that’s worth pondering) with the help of astounding cinematography from Türksoy Gölebeyi, tight editing from Çiçek Kahraman and Natalin Solakoğlu, mesmerizingly painful art direction from Elif Taşçıoğlu and not to mention the powerful sound design (which holds the motif skeleton of the film) by Burak Topalakçı and Sascha Walker. Kudos to the cast and crew, who bring a film catering to all tastes, mainstream and independent.

Emrah Güler, writing for Hürriyet Daily News, calls the film, One of the most anticipated Turkish films of the year, and recommends it to, Those who have become sick of Turkish horror movies with Islamic motifs and poor stories and want to try a fresh look at the genre.

Todd Brown, writing for Twitch Film, describes the film as, An atmospheric thriller with dark supernatural overtones, that is, The latest title to try to be a true breakout hit to put Turkey on the map for genre film lovers, and comments that it, boasts a very aggressive trailer that promises good things.

Deljhp, writing for 24Framespersecond.net, writes that the film, looks beautifully shot, and absolutely chock full of atmosphere, that really seems to upped the ante again, and also commenting on the trailer adds, Whoever did sound production and score for this, really knows their stuff.

== See also ==
- 2010 in film
- Turkish films of 2010
