= How Beautiful the Ordinary =

2009 anthology of LGBT short stories by Michael Cart

How Beautiful the Ordinary: Twelve Stories of Identity
- Cover illustration of the anthology How Beautiful the Ordinary, edited by Michael Cart
- Author: Michael Cart, editor
- Language: English
- Genre: Young adult novel
- Publisher: HarperTeen
- Publication date: 2009
- Publication place: United States
- Media type: Print (hardback)
- Pages: 364
- ISBN: 0-06-115498-9

How Beautiful the Ordinary: Twelve Stories of Identity is an anthology of LGBTQ short stories for young adults edited by American author Michael Cart. It was first published in 2009. The anthology contains an introduction by Cart, 11 short stories, and one novella by acclaimed lesbian and gay authors.

The book was a Lambda Literary Award finalist for LGBT Children's/Young Adult literature. Booklist added the work to its Rainbow List 2010, a bibliography of young adult books which include significant gay, lesbian, bisexual, transgender, or questioning content.

== Contents ==
The anthology contains an introduction by editor Michael Cart, and the 12 stories. Cart's six-page introduction declares the theme of the anthology to be "what it might mean to be gay, lesbian, or transgender." The introduction introduces each author, briefly describes their story entry, and provides a very brief note about how the story confronts the concept of sexual identity. Three stories feature transgender characters, and two explore how nationality and language barriers interact with sexual orientation. Most of the stories are written from the perspective of people in their late teens or 20s.

The title of the anthology is taken from David Levithan's short story, "A Word From the Nearly Distant Past", which is the first short story in the book: "He has no idea how beautiful the ordinary becomes once it disappears."

The short stories in the book are:

- "A Word From the Nearly Distant Past" by David Levithan—Written as if it were a message from gay men in the past to gay teens today, this story is told in flashback. The unnamed narrators (the plural pronoun "we" is used throughout the work) describe how a few young men are seen in the present going to a boyfriend's house, dancing alone, attending an LGBTQ prom, etc. The narrators express knowledge about how these young men feel, and urge them to live life fully. The story is 13 pages long. David Levithan wrote the novel Two Boys Kissing as a full-length version of this story.
- "Happily Ever After" by Eric Shanower—This short story is told in comic book format. Two high school teenage boys seem to be in love, but their relationship is in trouble because Mark has difficulty accepting he is gay. The two discover a genie (the comically named Genie-Fouadi-Wadi-Wasr-Ras-Daroun-Boun-Ali-Meht-Ma-Hani-Pal the Perspicacious) in a bottle who grants them each a wish. The unnamed narrator wants Mark to love him, but a horrified Mark demands that the genie remove his homosexuality. The genie grants each teen his wish. Three years pass. Both men (now in college) are miserable, but because "when a genie grants a wish, it comes true" the genie must intervene again. The story is 13 pages long.
- "My Life As A Dog" by Ron Koertge—At first, this is a fantasy story told in the first-person singular by Noah, a dog with very human emotions and intelligence. But at points throughout the story, the text changes to look like a screenplay. The screenplay describes a teenage boy, Noah, who has apparently been hit by a car. Noah has quarrelsome parents, and his father is particularly homophobic. The screenplay-like text reveals that Noah is closeted and has a boyfriend, Robbie, who is not. Noah and Robbie quarrel over whether Noah should come out, but Noah refuses because his father already treats him like a dog. The reality of Noah's situation becomes apparent through the story, as well as the truth about Noah's accident. The short story is 26 pages long.
- "Trev" by Jacqueline Woodson—Trev Louis Johnson is a six-year-old transgender boy. He is biologically female but already Trev knows he is a boy. Trev knows he is "wrong down there" but his father and brother have a great deal of difficulty handling Trev's gender identity. Trev himself struggles to understand his gender as he begins first grade, and learns the story of his great-aunt Dane. This story is nine pages long.
- "My Virtual World" by Francesca Lia Block—Primarily written as a series of e-mails from "Boy Blue" to "Ms. R.E." (i.e., misery), this story tells about the growing friendship between Garret and Rebecca, two people who have never met and communicate primarily online. Over the course of the emails, Garret reveals that he is a transsexual who was born female, and who may have attempted suicide. Rebecca also has a secret (revealed in part at the end of the story), and has engaged in cutting. The two emotionally troubled people bond, with their future revealed in a traditionally-written narrative text. The short story is 13 pages long.
- "A Dark Red Love Knot" by Margo Lanagan—Tom Coyne is an English teenager living in the past (possibly the 17th century). He works as a stableboy at a local inn. The first-person narrative briefly describes how Tom saw Bess (the innkeeper's daughter) meeting with her lover (a handsome highwayman) one night in the stables. Tom tells how he recently lost his sexual virginity to a soldier in the King's army. Desiring to see his lover again, Tom tells the innkeeper about his daughter's sexual indiscretion in the hopes this will bring the King's men to the inn. Consumed only by his own desire to see his soldier, Tom does not consider the consequences of his actions (which lead to tragedy). The short story is 29 pages long and based on the poem "The Highwayman" by Alfred Noyes.
- "Fingernail" by William Sleator—Lep is a young Thai with little education who speaks no English. Although he has had homosexual sex with other Thai men, it is unsatisfying to him. He meets Bernard, a French tourist. They make love and spend much time together. Bernard returns to France, and Lep works hard to learn English. Bernard returns to Thailand, but Lep realizes Bernard is insanely jealous. He accuses Lep of having sex with other men all the time, and one night tries to smother him in bed. Lep forgives Bernard. Bernard's jealousy worsens. After a final act of treachery, Lep refuses to see Bernard any longer. Lep must decide whether his love for Bernard was real, and whether knowing Bernard was worth it. The story is told in broken English, as if written by a non-native speaker of English. The story is 22 pages long.
- "Dyke March" by Ariel Schrag—Told in comic book format, this short story depicts the major events that occur every half hour one evening as an unnamed lesbian attends a pride parade. Various events occur (planning for the parade, texting friends, dancing, etc.) and she experiences various emotions (eagerness, paranoia, awe, hunger, etc.). Her ability to deal with the things she sees and experiences, conveyed comically and primarily in visual form, is the basis of the story. This story is five pages long, and is the shortest in the book.
- "The Missing Person" by Jennifer Finney Boylan—Written in the first-person, the narrator of this story, Jimmy, is a boy who, during the summer between the eighth and ninth grade, decides he wants to be a girl. The story describes "Jenny's" first experience as she dresses in girls' clothing that belongs to her older sister and goes to a local fair. A subplot about a Taiwanese exchange student who becomes trapped in a wall bookends the narrative, providing a metaphor for what the transsexual narrator feels. The story is 18 pages long.
- "First Time" by Julie Ann Peters—Jesi and Nicolle are two lesbians about to have their first sexual encounter. The short story is told in the first-person narrative by both people. The text is split into two columns, with Jesi's narrative on the left and Nicolle's on the right. Each girl remembers important things which have happened during their relationship (such as the first time they hugged) as they prepare to engage in sex, engage in foreplay, and consummate the sex act. The text is somewhat sexually explicit (primarily the description of body parts). The story is 31 pages long.
- "Dear Lang" by Emma Donoghue—This short story is written in the form of a letter from a 40-year-old dyke (a masculine lesbian) to her 16-year-old daughter, Lang. The woman reveals that she used to be partnered with Lang's mother, Cheryl. Cheryl received artificial insemination and gave birth to Lang when the narrator was 24 years old. Two years later, the two women's relationship ended and Cheryl won custody of Lang. The narrator reveals much of her own life story and her current situation through the letter, and talks about the hopes she has as a parent for both Lang and for her own child (her current partner is pregnant). The story is 35 pages long.
- "The Silk Road Runs Through Tupperneck, N.H." by Gregory Maguire—Faroukh Rahmani is an 18-year-old Iranian American. In danger of losing his college scholarship after failing a class, he takes a make-up summer course in music at the fictional Tupperneck College in Tupperneck, New Hampshire. He meets the impossibly handsome, muscular, and talented Blaise D'Anjou, a French American music student. Faroukh struggles with poverty, family relationships, and his own sexual desire for the emotionally cold, distant Blaise. But the revelation of a tragedy in Blaise's family brings the two men together. This first-person narrative is interspersed with a third-person singular narrative, describing events 15 years later as Faroukh brings his two young children to New Hampshire to attend a concert at Tupperneck College. The sacrifices a gay person makes for one's family, in the face of tragedy, and to secure a career form the basis of both narratives, which are tied together at the end of the novella. The story is 117 pages long.

== Critical reception ==
A review in the School Library Journal called the anthology "refreshing" and chose the stories by Lanagan and Maguire. The review cited the main character in William Sleator's "Fingernail" as "compelling", and said Ron Koertge's "My Life as a Dog" contained "an ingenious metaphor for coming out". Kirkus Reviews concluded that the book contained "[p]rovocative, quality content." The journal cited Shanower's "Happily Ever After" and Block's "My Virtual World" as the best stories in the collection. Reviewer Gillian Engberg, writing in Booklist, found the experimentation in narrative styles "inventive" and the stories "raw [and] moving", and concluded the anthology was "a groundbreaking addition to young-adult literature". Erin Williams, reviewing the book of the PFLAG National Blog, found the collection "unique" because "...the stories vary from spiritually philosophical to personal histories to comic strips—all dealing with teen GLBT experiences."
