= Aslı İnandık =

Turkish actress (born 1989)

- Born: 3 October 1989 (age 36); Ankara, Turkey
- Other name: Aslı İnandık Kazmaz
- Occupation: Actress
- Years active: 2014–present
- Spouse: Ahad Kazmaz
- Awards: Golden Orange Award for Best Supporting Actress (2019)

Aslı İnandık (born 3 October 1989) is a Turkish actress and writer.

== Life and career ==
İnandık was born on 3 October 1989 in Ankara. After finishing her primary and secondary education, she studied music at the Ankara Fine Arts High School and later continued her studies at Gazi University. She then studied acting at Ankara University.

While continuing her acting education, she started posting videos of herself character acting on Vine and Instagram and later on YouTube. She started her TV career in 2014 with a small role in the final episode of Yalan Dünya, after Gülse Birsel saw these videos and offered the role to her.

She played numerous roles in theatrical sketches Güldür Güldür in 2017. She continued her TV appearances with her role as Feraye in Yıldızlar Şahidim and as Saniye Doğan in Benim Tatlı Yalanım.

İnandık made her cinematic debut with the movie Şevkat Yerimdar 2 in 2015, in which she played the character of Buket. In 2018, she appeared on stage in the play Köleler Adası. At this point, she stated that she wanted to write a script about the characters she had previously created and portrayed on social media and shoot a movie based on that.

In 2019, she fulfilled this wish and played her first leading role by playing the character of Aslı in the movie Aslı Gibidir, in which she portrayed eight different characters. It was the first time in Turkish cinema's history that an actor played eight different characters in a movie. In the same year, for her role as Aslı in the movie Soluk, she won the Best Supporting Actress award at the 56th Antalya Golden Orange Film Festival.

== Theatre ==
Year	Title	Role
2018	Köleler Adası	
2020	Waterproof	Merlin

== Filmography ==
=== Television ===
Year	Title	Role
2014	Yalan Dünya	
2017	Güldür Güldür	Gülşen
2017	Yıldızlar Şahidim	Feraye
2019	Benim Tatlı Yalanım	Saniye Doğan
2020	Menajerimi Ara	Herself

=== Film ===
Year	Title	Role	Notes
2016	Şevkat Yerimdar 2	Buket	
2018	Cici Babam	girl at the airport	
2019	Aslı Gibidir	Aslı	
2019	Soluk	Aslı	
2022	Bir Türk Masalı		Initially set for release on 23 April 2020, but was postponed due to the COVID-19 pandemic.
2023	Oregon		

== Reception ==
The characters created and the comments made by İnandık and shared by her on social media have been among the subjects covered by columnists. In his column in the Hürriyet newspaper, Onur Baştürk described the characters of Ms. Salkım, meditation teacher and housewife as "awesome" and "ideal for laughing." Melike Karakartal wrote that İnandık is "one of the most talented and funny actors in recent years." In another article, she stated that watching İnandık made her "laugh until tears came to her eyes" and that she was "very talented", adding "I haven't met anyone in a long time who can turn into the person she is imitating." She described İnandık's role in the play Waterproof as "a very surprising performance with a very different character."
