= Ali Biçim =

Turkish actor

- Born: 17 April 1987 (age 39); İzmit, Turkey
- Education: Beykent University
- Occupations: Actor, influencer

Ali Biçim (born 17 April 1987) is a Turkish actor and influencer.

== Television programs ==
Television
| Year | Title | Network | Notes |
|---|---|---|---|
| 2011–2012 | Medya Kralı | TV8 | Actor |
| 2011–2012 | Disko Kıralı | TV8 | Actor |
| 2014 | Ali Biçim Show | FOX | Presenter |

== Filmography ==
Television
| Year | Title | Role |
|---|---|---|
| 2018 | Tam Kafadan | Şenol |
| 2013 | Babam Sınıfta Kaldı | Yazgan |
| 2020 | Menajerimi Ara | Himself |

Film
| Year | Title | Role |
|---|---|---|
| 2019 | Sar Başa | Oral |
| 2016 | Propaganda 2 | - |

== Discography ==
=== Single ===
- "Yanmayalım Mı Ertan" (2020)

== Other works ==
Music video
| 2011 | Just Pide |
| 2011 | Ellerim Nasırlı |

Book
| 2017 | Bu Ne Biçim Hikâye Böyle |
