= Gümüş (TV series) =

- Genre: Romance, Family drama
- Written by: Eylem Canpolat; Sema Ergenekon
- Directed by: Tarık Alpagut; Kemal Uzun
- Starring: Kıvanç Tatlıtuğ; Songül Öden
- Theme music composer: Cem Erman
- Country of origin: Turkey
- Original language: Turkish
- No. of episodes: 100

Production
- Producer: İrfan Şahin
- Running time: 90 minutes
- Production company: D Productions

Original release
- Network: Kanal D
- Release: January 20, 2005 – June 16, 2007

Gümüş (Turkish for "silver") is a Turkish television drama that originally aired on Kanal D from 2005 to 2007. The series was broadcast in the Arab world under the title Noor, where it became particularly popular. Its finale reportedly attracted approximately 85 million viewers across the region in August 2008.

== Plot ==
After the death of his girlfriend in a car accident, Mehmet's grandfather suggests that he marry Gümüş, who has loved Mehmet since childhood. Initially happy about the marriage, Gümüş despairs when she realizes that his heart is not in it. Eventually, Mehmet falls in love with her, and her dream comes true.

== Cast ==
| Actor | Character |
|---|---|
| Songül Öden | Gümüş Şadoğlu |
| Kıvanç Tatlıtuğ | Mehmet Şadoğlu |
| Ekrem Bora | Mehmet Fikri |
| Güngör Bayrak | Şeref Şadoğlu |
| Funda İlhan | Esra |
| Ayça Varlıer | Pınar |
| Serdar Orçin | Onur |
| Kayra Simur | Defne |
| Laçin Ceylan | Gülsün |
| Sevinç Gürsen Akyıldız | Bahar |
| Kamil Güler | Gökhan |
| Soydan Soydas | Berk |
| Ayla Arslancan | Safiye |
| Tarık Ünlüoğlu | Tarık |
| Sema Mumcu | Tuğçe |
| Türkan Kılıç | Zeynep |
| Barış Bağcı | Emir |
| Cüneyt Çalışkur | Ahmet |
| Alper Düzen | |
| Hilal Uysun | Nihan |
| Barış Hayat | Ilker |
| Burak Yavas | Mehmet Can |
| Uğur Aslan | Orhan |
| Yeliz Başlangiç | Rukiye |
| Emre Karayel | Engin |
| Tayfun Eraslan | Levent |
| Hikmet Karagöz | Osman |
| Elif Aksar | Kader |
| Cansın Özyosun | Didem |
| Faik Ergen | Berk II |
| Murat Onuk | Cihan |
| Füsun Erbulak | Dilruba |
| Zuhal Tasar Gökhan | Billur |
| Erdal Cindoruk | Kenan |
| Göktug Alpasar | Selim |
| Yonca Oskay | Nilüfer |
| Meltem Ören | Beril |
| Dilek Serbest | Derin |
| Murat Akdağ | Köylü |
| Çiğdem Batur | Dilek |

== Popularity ==
In Saudi Arabia, three to four million viewers reported watching the program daily on the Saudi-owned MBC channel. The show's final episode attracted a record 85 million Arab viewers when it aired on August 30, 2008. The success of Gümüş for MBC sparked a boom in dubbed Turkish dramas across many leading Arab sat-casters. MBC even launched a pay-TV channel in partnership with pay-TV platform Showtime Arabia entirely dedicated to Gümüş that allows viewers to watch episodes of the sudser around the clock.

In Bulgaria, Gümüş was also very popular and every episode was watched by at least 2 million viewers. As a result of its popularity, Songül Öden came to Bulgaria and was a guest in the Bulgarian TV shows "Dancing Stars 2" and "Slavi Show". She also visited Albania as a guest in the "Kënga Magjike" festival in 2011. It is above average in Pakistan and was airing on Geo Tv but was transferred on Geo Kahani in Pakistan. The series was also popular in Macedonia. Gümüş was one of the first series shown in Macedonia, and now the popularity of the Turkish series in Macedonia is growing. In 2020, Gümüş was again featured on the online Urdu dubbing YouTube channel Drama Central.

== Reception and influence ==
Gümüş and Mehmet observe Ramadan, and their marriage is arranged by Mehmet's grandfather but the characters break with tradition in other ways. Characters are shown drinking wine with dinner, partying, and kissing onscreen which has been deemed inappropriate for younger audiences such as children. Mehmet is depicted to have had sex (and an illegitimate child) before marrying Gümüş, and one of his cousins has an abortion. Perhaps most significantly, Gümüş and Mehmet's marriage is depicted (in an idealized way) as a modern partnership between equals, in which Mehmet supports his wife's career ambitions as a fashion designer. The AP reports that the show "seems particularly effective in changing attitudes because it offers new content in a familiar setting: Turkey is a Muslim country, inviting stronger viewer identification than Western TV imports."

Maternity wards report a rise in the baby names Noor and Mohannad, the names of Gümüş and Mehmet in the Arabic dub.

Clothing stores throughout the Middle East report brisk sales of blouses and dresses seen on the television series.

The show encouraged Arabs to visit Turkey. The success of Noor in the Arab world was partly attributed to the fact that it was dubbed into the Syrian dialect—a widely understood living variety of Arabic—and not into the little spoken formal Arabic which had hitherto been used to dub Mexican telenovelas.

== The final episode ==
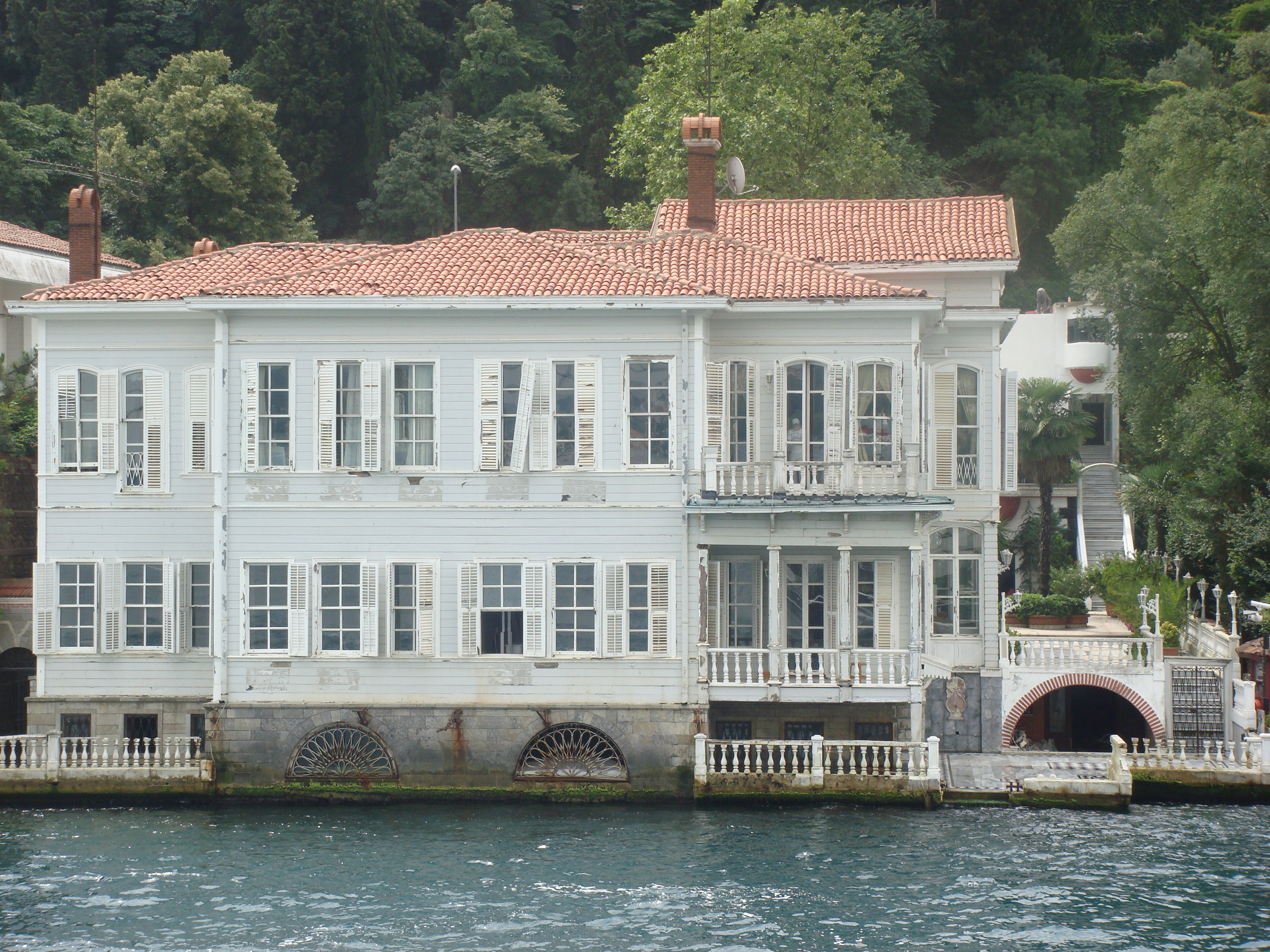
Palace

In the final episode of the series, the time is moved forwards to 14 years later and the audience sees that everyone has grown up and are all living a happy life. Gümüş is writing in her diaries about what has happened for the past 13 years and shows us how all the characters have grown up and changed including her current pregnancy.

== Series overview ==
| Season | No. of Episodes | Day and Time of Broadcasting | Start of the Season | End of the Season | Episodes | TV Season | TV Channel |
|---|---|---|---|---|---|---|---|
| 1 | 21 | Thursday 20:00 | January 20, 2005 | June 23, 2005 | 1-21 | 2005 | Kanal D |
| 2 | 40 | Thursday-Wednesday 20:00 | August 2005 | June 28, 2006 | 22 - 61 | 2005-2006 | Kanal D |
| 3 | 39 | Saturday 22:00 | September 2006 | June 16, 2007 | 62 - 100 (Final) | 2006-2007 | Kanal D |
