= Leo Sheng =

Chinese-American actor and activist

- Born: 1996 (age 28–29); Hunan, China
- Education: University of Michigan (BA)
- Occupations: Actor, activist

Leo Sheng (born 1996) is a Chinese American actor and activist known for playing Micah Lee on The L Word: Generation Q.

== Early life and education ==
Sheng was born in Hunan, China and was adopted and raised in Ypsilanti, Michigan by an American lesbian couple. He first came out as trans at age 12.

He received his Bachelor of Science degree in sociology from the University of Michigan in 2017. Sheng was accepted to the school's social work graduate program and planned to enroll, but left because he was cast in his first professional acting role in Adam.

== Career ==
Sheng first gained attention when he was 17 and used YouTube and Instagram to document his transition. In 2018, he acted in his first lead role in Rhys Ernst's Adam. He also appeared in the documentary Disclosure. He is a lead character on Showtime's The L Word: Generation Q as Micah Lee, who is also a trans man. When he was 11, Sheng watched a clip of a transmasculine character, Max, on the original L Word series and came out as trans shortly after.

== Personal life ==
Sheng resides in Los Angeles. He is queer and a trans man.

== Filmography ==
=== Film ===
Year	Title	Role	Notes
2019	Adam	Ethan	
2020	Disclosure: Trans Lives on Screen	—	Also creative consultant
2021	The Matrix Resurrections	N/A	Assistant

=== Television ===
Year	Title	Role	Notes
2019–23	The L Word: Generation Q	Micah Lee	19 episodes
