= Ece Dizdar =

Turkish actress

- Born: 23 November 1981 (age 43); Istanbul, Turkey
- Occupation: Actress
- Years active: 2002–present
- Spouse: Serdar Orçin (m. 2025)
- Website: ecedizdar.com

Ece Dizdar (born 23 November 1981) is a Turkish actress.

== Life and career ==
Dizdar was born in Istanbul. During her childhood, her father went on missions as a submarine worker and she moved with him to different cities across Turkey and stayed in countries such as Pakistan, Belgium, and the UK. She usually studied at DoDDS American schools where she traveled. During her secondary school years, she studied musicals and dance in Belgium, and appeared on the stage by joining the children's conservatory for 2 years. After graduating from Marmara University Faculty of Communication, she moved to London, completed her acting education at the ARTSED acting academy with a scholarship and started her professional acting career. Ece Dizdar translated plays such as Shopping and F… ing and Festen for Dot Theatre. She later worked as a voice actress for professional commercials and promotional works. She then continued her stage career in Turkey and England, and soon appeared in television and cinematic productions.

Dizdar first became known through her role in the 2002 En Son Babalar Duyar TV series. She continued her career in TV with a role in the 2003 TV series Esir Şehrin Gözyaşları. After appearing in the TV series Hayalet in 2004, she took a break from acting. She returned to TV screens in 2011 after being cast in the series Karakol. In 2012, she played the role of Yeşim in the TV series Şubat. She then portrayed the character of Melda in the series Güneşi Beklerken and in 2015 appeared as Şevval in the series Beş Kardeş.

== Theatre ==
- Yutmak, Craft Theatre, 2017
- Altın Ejderha, Dot Theatre, 2012–2013
- İki Kişilik Bir Oyun, İKSV Salon-Dot Theatre, director: Bülent Erkmen
- Shopping And F…ing, Dot Theatre, director: Murat Daltaban, 2009–2011
- Vur/Yağmala/Yeniden, Dot Theatre, director: Murat Daltaban, 2009
- Kız Tavlama Sanatı, Talimhane Theatre, director: Mehmet Ergen, 2008
- My Name İs Red, BBC Radio Theatre, director: John Dryden, 2008
- Startle Response, Young VIC Theatre, director: Samantha Ellis, 2007
- Sugar And Snow, BBC-Radio 4 Theatre, 2006
- Birds Without Wings, Eastern Angles Theatre, director: Ivan Cutting, 2006
- Leyla, National Theatre Studios, director: Robin Hooper, 2005
- Release The Beat, Arcola Theatre, director: Mehmet Ergen, 2004
- Pof ve Paf, Istanbul State Theatre, 2003

== Filmography ==
=== Film ===
- 2019 - Love, Spells and All That (Aşk, Büyü vs.) - director: Ümit Ünal
- 2019 - Küçük Şeyler - director: Kıvanç Sezer
- 2013 - Çekmeceler - director: Mehmet Binay, Caner Alper
- 2007 - Getting It On - director: Chris Menaul
- 2005 - Percy Circus - director: Kenny Strickland
- 2004 - Simbiyotik

=== Television ===
- 2022 - Gizli Saklı (Nehir)
- 2021–2022 - Yasak Elma (Feyza)
- 2021 – Menajerimi Ara (herself / guest appearance)
- 2017–2018 - Siyah Beyaz Aşk (İdil)
- 2016 - Arkadaşlar İyidir (Leyla)
- 2015 - Beş Kardeş (Şevval)
- 2013 - Güneşi Beklerken (Melda)
- 2012 - Şubat (Yeşim)
- 2011–2012 - Al Yazmalım (Nermin)
- 2011 - Karakol (Dicle)
- 2004 - Hayalet (Funda)
- 2003 - Esir Şehrin Gözyaşları (Patrick's wife)
- 2002 - En Son Babalar Duyar

=== Web series ===
- 2021 - Yetiş Zeynep (Beril)
- 2020 - Alef
- 2017 - Görünen Adam (Zühtü)
- 2017 - Fi (Nazlı)

== Awards ==
- 21st Sadri Alışık Theatre and Cinema Awards: Most Successful Actress of the Year (Drama) (Çekmeceler)
- 39th Istanbul Film Festival: Best Actress (Aşk, Büyü vs.)
