= Cousins (2019 film) =

2019 Brazilian film

- Directed by: Thiago Cazado; Mauro Carvalho
- Starring: Thiago Cazado; Paulo Sousa
- Release date: 29 May 2019
- Running time: 1h 23min
- Country: Brazil
- Language: Portuguese

Cousins (Portuguese: Primos) is a 2019 Brazilian comedy-drama film directed by Thiago Cazado and Mauro Carvalho. The film follows the romance that blossoms between cousins Lucas and Mario after they are left alone at their aunt's house.

The feature film stars Thiago Cazado who, in addition to being the screenwriter and director of the film, also played one of the protagonists, Mário. The cast also includes: Paulo Sousa, Juliana Zancanaro, Denis Camargo, Eduarda Esteves and Carmen Lutcha.

== Cast ==
- Thiago Cazado – Mario Hantz
- Paulo Sousa – Lucas Hantz
- Juliana Zancanaro – Tante Lourdes
- Duda Esteves – Julia
- Denis Camargo – Emilio

== Reception ==
Enrique Acosta of Film Threat rated it 6 out of 10, and wrote, "peppered with some really charming or romantically charged scenes that are dragged down by its more poorly executed moments and a less than competent translation, I'd suggest waiting for the remake." Carlos Aguilar of Los Angeles Times wrote that, "artistically awkward, Brazilian gay teen romance (...) still charms".

== See also ==
- List of LGBTQ-related films of 2019
