= Love, Spells and All That =

2019 Turkish drama film

- Turkish: Aşk, Büyü vs.
- Directed by: Ümit Ünal
- Written by: Ümit Ünal
- Produced by: Ümit Ünal
- Starring: Selen Uçer; Ece Dizdar
- Cinematography: Türksoy Gölebeyi
- Edited by: Melike Kasaplar
- Music by: Ümit Ünal
- Production company: MTAFilm
- Distributed by: TLA Releasing
- Release date: 29 October 2019 (Antalya)
- Running time: 96 minutes
- Country: Turkey
- Language: Turkish

Love, Spells and All That (Turkish: Aşk, Büyü vs.) is a Turkish drama film, written and directed by Ümit Ünal and released in 2019. The film stars Selen Uçer as Reyhan and Ece Dizdar as Eren, two women in a small Turkish town who had a love affair as teenagers but were separated when Eren went away to university in Paris; now, 20 years later, Eren returns wanting to rekindle their relationship, but Reyhan is uncertain even though she had once cast a love spell to make Eren love her forever.

The film's cast also includes Ayşenil Şamlıoğlu, Uygar Özçelik, Emrah Kolukisa, Damla Ersan, Tonguç Rador, Murat Toprak, Sirzat Bilallar, Melisa Demir, Gizem Katmer, Rohat Culum, Ramazan Alkan, Serhat Gonen, Eyüp Kelen, Onur Alkan, Alaattin Ekin, Muharrem Dursun, Kasim Arli, Yilmaz Arli, Melik Alkan, Kerim Ünal, Ilhan Alkan and Görkem Mertsöz.

The film premiered at the Antalya Golden Orange Film Festival in 2019. It was picked up for international distribution by TLA Releasing in 2021.

== Awards ==
Award	Date of ceremony	Category	Recipient(s)	Result	Ref(s)
Antalya Golden Orange Film Festival	2019	Best Film	Ümit Ünal	Nominated	
Antalya Golden Orange Film Festival	2019	SIYAD Jury Award	Ümit Ünal	Won	
Antalya Golden Orange Film Festival	2019	Dr. Avni Tolunay Jury Award	Ümit Ünal	Won	
Antalya Golden Orange Film Festival	2019	Best Actress	Selen Uçer	Won	
Istanbul Film Festival	2020	Golden Tulip for Best Film	Ümit Ünal	Won	
Istanbul Film Festival	2020	Best Screenplay	Ümit Ünal	Won	
Istanbul Film Festival	2020	Best Actress	Selen Uçer	Won	
Istanbul Film Festival	2020	Best Actress	Ece Dizdar	Won	
Inside Out Film and Video Festival	2021	Audience Award	Love, Spells and All That	Won	
Outfest	2021	Best International Screenplay	Ümit Ünal	Won	
Turkish Film Critics Association	2022	Best Film	Love, Spells and All That	Won	
Turkish Film Critics Association	2022	Best Director	Ümit Ünal	Nominated	
Turkish Film Critics Association	2022	Best Actress	Selen Uçer	Won	
Turkish Film Critics Association	2022	Best Actress	Ece Dizdar	Nominated	
Turkish Film Critics Association	2022	Best Screenplay	Ümit Ünal	Won	
Turkish Film Critics Association	2022	Best Cinematography	Türksoy Gölebeyi	Nominated	
Turkish Film Critics Association	2022	Best Music	Ümit Ünal	Nominated	
