= Love God (1997 film) =

- Directed by: Frank Grow
- Written by: Frank Grow
- Produced by: Frank Grow
- Starring: Will Keenan; Shannon Burkett; Kymberli Ghee; Kerri Kenney; Michael Laurence; Dale Soules; Yukio Yamamoto; Vin Knight; Christine Holt
- Cinematography: Terry Stacey
- Edited by: Davey Frankel
- Release date: 1997
- Running time: 82 minutes
- Country: United States
- Language: English

Love God is a 1997 American comedy-drama film and the sole narrative feature of director Frank Grow. The film is the first dramatic feature shot on video to premiere at Sundance Film Festival and is recognized for its unconventional narrative structure and surreal, experimental visuals.

== Plot ==
The story follows Larue, who suffers from schizophrenia and has a compulsive reading disorder, as he attempts to reintegrate into society after a stint in a mental institution. His attempts at reintegration are complicated when he begins to be haunted by Hindu deities, as well as mutated worms.

== Cast ==
- Will Keenan as Larue
- Shannon Burkett as Helen
- Kymberli Ghee as Kathleen / Kali
- Kerri Kenney as Darla
- Michael Laurence as Victor
- Dale Soules as Connie
- Yukio Yamamoto as Dr. Noguchi
- Vin Knight as Christian
- Christine Holt as Red Haired Hooker

== Production ==
The film was independently produced and received attention for its experimental approach and surreal aesthetic. The film's high energy soundtrack features music from Lubricated Goat, Joan Jett, Bad Brains, Unsane, Cranes and Rocket From the Crypt.

== Release and reception ==
=== Festivals ===
Love God was selected and screened at the following film festivals:

- 1997 Sundance Film Festival
- 1997 Toronto International Film Festival
- 1997 Thessaloniki International Film Festival
- 1997 Helsinki International Film Festival
- 1997 International Film Festival Rotterdam

=== Critical response ===
Critical response to Love God was mixed. Fred Camper of The Chicago Reader described the film as "wildly inventive." Anita Gates of The New York Times was critical of the film, stating that it was "all-surface copycatting, weirdness for the shock value alone" and "very taken with its own cleverness." Godfrey Cheshire of Variety called the film "imaginative and expertly executed." Steven Puchalski of Shock Cinema said of the film that it was "dazzling, frustrating and altogether original."

While not a commercial success, Love God has gained a cult following for its unconventional storytelling, heavy use of special effects, and colorful visual aesthetic. It is also recognized as an important contribution to the low budget independent films of the 1990s and a live-action feature shot entirely on digital and transferred to film.
