= Adam (2019 American film) =

2019 film directed by Rhys Ernst

- Theatrical release poster
- Directed by: Rhys Ernst
- Written by: Ariel Schrag
- Based on: Adam; 2014 novel by Ariel Schrag
- Produced by: Howard Gertler; James Schamus
- Starring: Nicholas Alexander; Bobbi Menuez; Leo Sheng; Chloe Levine; Margaret Qualley; Colton Ryan
- Cinematography: Shawn Peters
- Edited by: Joe Murphy
- Music by: Jay Wadley
- Production companies: Little Punk; Symbolic Exchange; Meridan Entertainment
- Distributed by: Wolfe Releasing
- Release dates: January 25, 2019 (Sundance); August 14, 2019 (United States)
- Running time: 95 minutes
- Country: United States
- Language: English

Adam is a 2019 American comedy-drama film directed by Rhys Ernst, from a screenplay by Ariel Schrag, based upon the novel of the same name by Schrag. It stars Nicholas Alexander, Bobbi Menuez, Leo Sheng, Chloe Levine, and Margaret Qualley.

It had its world premiere at the Sundance Film Festival on January 25, 2019. It was released on August 14, 2019, by Wolfe Releasing.

== Plot ==
In 2006, shy and nerdy cisgender teenager Adam spends his last high school summer in New York City with his older sister, who is part of the local lesbian and trans activist scene. Adam meets and develops a crush on a lesbian named Gillian at an LGBTQ+ party. Gillian assumes that he is a trans man, and Adam confirms the lie, running with the deception in order to win her affection. Adam's struggle and guilt over his deceit increases as the relationship between him and Gillian deepens, eventually leading him to admit that he is not trans. Gillian accepts both this and him, having realized that she is bisexual rather than lesbian. They break up, however, as the relationship was based on lies, though Adam gains a deep regard toward trans people.

== Cast ==
- Nicholas Alexander as Adam Freeman
- Bobbi Menuez as Gillian
- Leo Sheng as Ethan
- Chloe Levine as June
- Margaret Qualley as Casey Freeman
- Jari Jones as Schuyler
- Michaela Jaé Rodriguez as Emma
- Colton Ryan as Brad
- Dana Aliya Levinson as Hazel
- Alisha B. Woods as Jackie
- Rachel Burkhardt as Nadia
- Melanie Hinkle as Kate
- Ashlie Atkinson as Bound Emcee
- Ana Gasteyer as Mom
- Yva Las Vegass as club bouncer

== Production ==
In November 2016, it was announced Desiree Akhavan would direct the film, from a screenplay by Ariel Schrag, based upon her novel of the same name. James Schamus and Howard Gertler would produce the film, while Joe Pirro would serve as an executive producer under their Symbolic Exchange banner. However, Akhavan had to drop out of the film due to scheduling conflicts, and Rhys Ernst ended up directing the film.

The film's original score was composed by Jay Wadley, with additional guitar performances contributed by David Veslocki.

== Release ==
It had its world premiere at the Sundance Film Festival on January 25, 2019. Shortly after, Wolfe Releasing acquired distribution rights to the film. It was released on August 14, 2019.

== Critical reception ==
Adam holds a 74% approval rating on review aggregator website Rotten Tomatoes, based on 23 reviews, with an average of 6.9/10. The site's critical consensus reads, "Much like its well-meaning but clueless protagonist, Adam occasionally seems to be in over its head -- but its good intentions make those fumbles easier to forgive." On Metacritic, the film holds a rating of 64 out of 100, based on 10 critics, indicating "generally favorable" reviews.

=== Controversy ===
Because gender deception is a major plot element of the film (and the novel upon which it is based), it has been the subject of controversy. Director Rhys Ernst, a trans person himself, has acknowledged the criticism of the source material, but says "a primary condition to my working on the project was that I would tell it from a trans perspective" and that "the changes address many of the concerns that have been raised about the novel", as well as stating "the things that people are afraid of, who haven't seen the movie, none of those things are in the movie." He also stated, "There were a lot of changes between the book and the script, so I didn't really dwell on the book that much. I'm seeing my role and vision in this to create a whole new work that's jumping off from the script but not the book so much."

Ernst also responded to online calls to boycott the film, saying, "the idea of boycotting or condemning projects before they're released is not progressive or beneficial. It reminds me of Gamergate, of attempts to shut down a female Ghostbusters movie [...] I don't think I believe in boycotts of cultural products, of art. There are other ways of engaging. I think, you know, burning a book, even the most vile book I can think of — I find that too close to fascism. I'm sorry. I don't believe in that."
