= Ayşenil Şamlıoğlu =

Actress, theatre director, and author

- Born: 20 March 1956 (age 69); Istanbul, Turkey
- Occupation(s): Actress, theatre director, author
- Years active: 1985–present

Ayşenil Şamlıoğlu (born 20 March 1956) is a Turkish actress, theatre director, and author.

In 1974, she enrolled in the Istanbul University School of Journalism and Public Relations but left the university and moved to Germany to take foreign language lessons in Frankfurt. Şamlıoğlu soon became interested in theatre and participated in works with amateur theatre groups. Upon returning to Turkey, Şamlıoğlu became enrolled in METU School of Architecture but left the school for the second time to join Anadolu Agency. After working there for a year, she joined a commercial agency as a drawer. She eventually graduated from Hacettepe University Ankara State Conservatory with a degree in theatre studies and in 1982 began working for Adana State Theatre as an actress and director.

Between 1988 and 1989, she gave theatre lessons at Hacettepe University and for a while worked as the general secretary for state theatre. Şamlıoğlu also authored Kaçıklık Diploması, which was adapted into a movie by Tunç Başaran. Her breakthrough came with her roles in the series Ferhunde Hanımlar and Bizim Evin Halleri. Her role in Yol Arkadaşım as "Hafize" made her widely known in Turkey. Alongside her career as an actress, she has worked in Istanbul City Theatres and Semaver Company as both a director and actress. In May 2009, Şamlıoğlu was appointed as the general art director for Istanbul City Theatres.

She is the daughter of the former President of the Court of Accounts Servet Şamlıoğlu (1926–1991). She also served as a judge at the 17th Afife Theatre Awards.

== Theatre ==
=== As director ===
- Kozalar : Adalet Ağaoğlu - Pangar - 2016
- Dil Kuşu : Pelin Temur - Destar Theatre - 2015
- Bana Mastikayı Çalsana : Nilbanu Engindeniz - Aysa Production Theatre - 2007
- Dünyanın Ortasında Bir Yer : Özen Yula - Istanbul State Theatre - 2007
- The Condemned of Altona : Jean-Paul Sartre - Ankara State Theatre - 2006
- Süleyman ve Öbürsüler : Max Frisch \ Yavuz Pekman - Semaver Company - 2005
- Gayri Resmi Hürrem : Özen Yula - Istanbul City Theatres - 2004
- Külhan Beyi Operası : Ülkü Ayvaz - Antalya State Theatre - 2002
- Bina : Behiç Ak - Sivas State Theatre - 2001
- The Good Soldier Švejk : Bertolt Brecht - Antalya State Theatre - 2001
- The Wasps : Aristophanes - Ankara State Theatre - 2000
- Pazartesi Perşembe : Musahipzade Celal - Adana State Theatre - 1999
- Frank V : Friedrich Dürrenmatt - Adana State Theatre - 1998
- Kozalar : Adalet Ağaoğlu - Istanbul State Theatre - 1997
- Ölüler Konuşmak İster : Melih Cevdet Anday - Istanbul State Theatre - 1997
- Ich Feuerbach : Tankred Dorst - Ankara State Theatre - 1995

=== As actress ===
- Öldün, Duydun mu? : Yiğit Sertdemir - Altıdan Sonra Theatre - 2013
- Evaristo : Civan Canova - Altıdan Sonra Theatre - 2013
- Geyikler Lanetler : Murathan Mungan - Ankara State Theatre
- Gılgameş : Zeynep Avcı - Ankara State Theatre - 1996
- Hüzün Coşkusu Altındağ : Yaşar Seymen\Adem Atar - Ankara State Theatre - 1992
- Deli Dumrul : Güngör Dilmen - Ankara State Theatre - 1990
- Aşkımız Aksaray!ın En Büyük Yangını : Güngör Dilmen - Ankara State Theatre - 1989
- Afife Jale : Nezihe Araz - Ankara State Theatre - 1987
- Detective Story : Sidney Kingsley - Ankara State Theatre - 1985

== Filmography ==
=== Film ===
- Love, Spells and All That (Aşk, Büyü vs.) - 2019
- İşe Yarar Bir Şey : Pelin Esmer - 2017 Gülistan
- Sen Aydınlatırsın Geceyi : Onur Ünlü - 2013 Şevket
- Eyyvah Eyvah 3 : Hakan Algül - 2013 Necla
- Eyyvah Eyvah 2 : Hakan Algül - 2010 Necla
- Prensesin Uykusu : Çağan Irmak - 2010
- Ay Lav Yu : Sermiyan Midyat - 2009
- Meleğin Sırları : Aclan Büyüktürkoğlu - 2008
- Sınav : Ömer Faruk Sorak - 2006
- İnşaat : Ömer Vargı - 2003
- O da Beni Seviyor : Barış Pirhasan - 2001
- Kaçıklık Diploması : Tunç Başaran - 1998

=== Television ===
- Gül Masalı (2022) - Fatma
- Yargı (2021–2022) - Şahver
- Bunu Bi' Düsünün (2021) - Münevver
- Menajerimi Ara (2020–2021) - Peride Sener
- Hizmetçiler (2020) - Nimet Atahanli
- Jet Sosyete (2018–2020) - Zahide Özpamuk
- Tatlı İntikam (2016) - Meliha Yılmaz
- Kocamın Ailesi (2014)
- Medcezir (2014)
- Bebek İşi (2013)
- Galip Derviş(2013)
- Aldırma Gönül (2013)
- Kötü Yol (2012)
- Bizim Yenge (2011)
- Sen de Gitme (2011)
- Çakıl Taşları (2010)
- Yol Arkadaşım (2008)
- Fikrimin İnce Gülü (2007)
- Kabuslar Evi (2006)
- İlk Aşkım (2006)
- Taşların Sırrı (2006)
- Doktorlar (2006)
- Nefes Nefese (2005)
- Avrupa Yakası (2004)
- Bizim Evin Halleri (2000)
- Ferhunde Hanımlar (1993)

== Awards ==
- 1988, The Art Society's Best Supporting Actress award (Afife Jale)
- 1997, The Art Society's Director of the Year award (Pierre Ray)
- 1998, İsmet Küntay Best Director award (Kozalar)
- 1998, İsmet Küntay Best Director award (Ölüler Konuşmak İster)
- 2000, İsmet Küntay Best Director award (Pazartesi Perşembe)
- 2000, Çırağan Lions Club - Türkan Kahramankaptan Best Production award (Pazartesi Perşembe)
- 2000, The Art Society's Best Production award (Pazartesi Perşembe)
- 2000, The Critics Association Best Director award (Pazartesi Perşembe)
- 2000, Afife Most Successful Director award (Gayrı Resmi Hürrem)
