= Yelda Reynaud =

Turkish-Austrian actress (born 1972)

- Born: Yelda Kaymakçı; 17 January 1972 (age 54); Vienna, Austria
- Years active: 1992–present

Yelda Reynaud (born Kaymakçı on 17 January 1972) is a Turkish-Austrian actress.

== Filmography ==
Film
| Year | Film | Role | Notes |
|---|---|---|---|
| 2007 | Auf der anderen Seite | Emine | |
| 2007 | Living & Dying | Det. Catherine Pulliam | |
| 2005 | Gece 11:45 | Zeynep | |
| 2005 | Yolda – Rüzgar geri getirirse | | |
| 2005 | Anlat Istanbul | Banu | |
| 2004 | Hosgeldin hayat | | |
| 2003 | Çamur | | |
| 2001 | Roberto Succo | Mylène | |
| 2000 | Girls Can't Swim | Solange | |
| 1999 | The Wound | Hülya | |

=== Television ===
| Year | Film | Role | Notes |
|---|---|---|---|
| 2009 | Parmakliklar Ardinda | | seasons 1 and 2 |
| 2005 | Sessiz gece | Reyhan | |
| 2003 | Kasabanin incisi | Inci | |
| 1996 | Berjac: Coup de théâtre | Zaza Lanquet | |
