= Ümit Ünal =

Turkish film director and writer

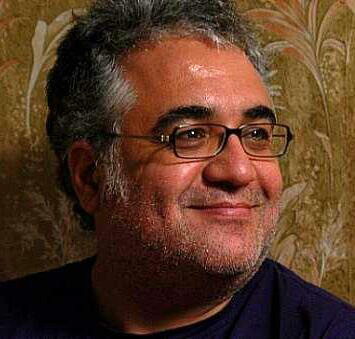
Ümit Ünal

Ümit Ünal (born 14 April 1965 in Tire, İzmir) is a Turkish film director, screenwriter and author. He is the scriptwriter for eight Turkish feature films including Teyzem (My Aunt) (1986), Hayallerim, Askim ve Sen (My Dreams, My Love and You) (1987). His first feature film as a director is 9 which won many awards in various film festivals and was the Official Turkish Entry for the 2003 Academy Award for Best Foreign Language Film. He wrote and directed ten feature films including Istanbul Tales (Anlat İstanbul), Ara, Gölgesizler (Shadowless), Ses (The Voice), Nar (The Pomegranate), Serial Cook (Sofra Sırları), Love, Spells and All That (Aşk, Büyü vs) and Playroom (Evcilik).

He has published five books.

As an artist/illustrator his credits include two personal exhibitions and four illustrated books.

He currently works as a freelance director/writer, living in Glasgow since 2020.

== Filmography ==
=== As director ===
- 9 (2001)
  - 2002 Istanbul International Film Festival – Best Turkish Film of the Year, Best Actress (Serra Yılmaz)
  - 2002 Ankara Film Festival – Best Screenplay, Best Actor – Fikret Kuşkan
  - 2002 14. Ankara Film Festival – Onat Kutlar Best Script, Promising Director
- Istanbul Tales (Anlat İstanbul) (2005)
  - 2005 Istanbul International Film Festival – Best Turkish Film of the Year, Best Actress (Yelda Reynaud)
  - 2005 Adana Golden Boll International Film Festival – Best Film, Best Editing, Best Director of Photography
  - 2005 MedFilm Festival-Rome – Artistic Expression (Original Idea) Award
  - 2006 Bangkok International Film Festival – Jury's Special Mention of Excellence
- Ara (2007)
  - 2008 Istanbul International Film Festival – Special Prize of the Jury, Best Actor (Serhat Tutumluer)
  - 2008 Adana Golden Boll International Film Festival – Best Screenplay, Best Editing, Best Actress (Selen Uçer)
- Shadowless (Gölgesizler) (2009)
- Kaptan Feza (Captain Space) (2010)
- SES (The Voice) (2010)
- NAR (The Pomegranate) (2011)
  - 2011 Antalya Golden Orange Film Festival – Special Jury Award
- Sofra Sırları (Serial Cook) (2018)
  - 2018 Istanbul Film Festival
    - Special Jury Award
    - Best Screenplay
    - Best Actress (Demet Evgar)
    - Best Editing
  - 2019 Yala International Film Festival, Nepal – Best Director
  - 2019 Dhaka International Film Festival, Bangladesh – Best Actress
- Love, Spells and All That (Aşk, Büyü vs.) (2019)
  - 2020 Istanbul Film Festival
    - Best Screenplay
    - Best Actress (Selen Ucer – Ece Dizdar)
  - 2020 Antalya Golden Orange
    - Best Actress (Selen Ucer)
    - SIYAD Turkish Film Critics Association Best Film Award
  - 2020 KAV Foundation The Director of The Year Award
  - 2021 Mostra Fire!! Barcelona LGBT+ Film Festival – Best Film
  - 2021 Inside Out, Toronto 2SLGBTQ+ Film Festival – Audience Award
  - 2021 Outfest LA Grand Jury Award – Outstanding Screenwriting in an International Feature
  - 2021 aGliff/ Prism Austin – All Genders, Lifestyles, and Identities Film Festival – Best Narrative Jury Prize
- Playroom (Evcilik) (2024)
  - 2024 Antalya Golden Orange Film Festival
    - Best Screenplay
    - Best Actor (Nejat İsler)
  - 2025 Nuremberg Turkish German Films Festival
    - Best Actress (Deniz Işın)
    - Best Actor (Nejat İsler)

=== As writer ===
- Teyzem (My Aunt) (1986) (Director: Halit Refiğ) (Milliyet Newspaper Screenplay Competition, First Prize)
- Milyarder (The Billionaire) (1987) (Director: Kartal Tibet)
- Hayallerim, Aşkım ve Sen (My Dreams, My Love and You) (1987) (Director: Atıf Yılmaz)
- Arkadaşım Şeytan (The Devil My Friend) (1988) (Director: Atıf Yılmaz)
- Piano Piano Bacaksız (Piano Piano Shorty) (1989) (Director: Tunç Başaran)
- Berlin in Berlin (1992) (Director: Sinan Çetin)
- Amerikalı (The American) (1993) (Director: Şerif Gören)
- Yaz Yagmuru (Summer Rain) (1993) (Director: Tomris Giritlioğlu)

== Published books ==
- Amerikan Güzeli (American Beauty) (1993) (Stories, Oglak Publishing)
- Aşkın Alfabesi (The Alphabet of Love) (1996) (Novel, İyi Seyler Publishing)
- Kuyruk (The Tail) (2001) (Novel, Oglak Publishing)
- Işık Gölge Oyunları (Light And Shadow Play) (2012) (Autobiography, Yapı Kredi Publishing)
- Bana Göre Kıyamet (Apocalypse For Me) (2018) (Novel, Everest Publishing)

== Exhibitions ==
- Mahlukat Bahçesi (The Garden of Oddities - Drawings) (2016) (Joint Idea Gallery, Curated by: Işık Gençoğlu/ Zeki Coşkun)
- Kuşlar, Yüzler ve Diğer Şeyler (Birds, Faces and Other Things (2018) (Istanbul Concept, Curated by: Işık Gençoğlu)
- Fotoğraflar (Photographs) (2001) (2018) (Istanbul Concept, Curated by: Işık Gençoğlu)
