= Ariel Schrag =

American cartoonist and television writer

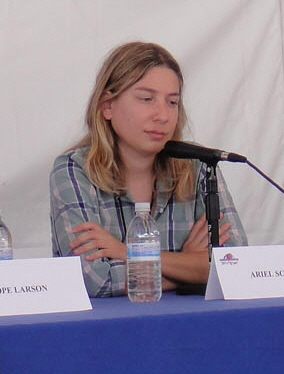
- Ariel Schrag at the WeHo Book Fair 2010
- Born: December 29, 1979 (age 46) Berkeley, California
- Areas: Cartoonist, Writer, Artist
- Notable works: Definition, Awkward, Potential, Likewise

Ariel Schrag (born December 29, 1979) is an American cartoonist and television writer who achieved critical recognition at an early age for her autobiographical comics. Her novel Adam provoked controversy with its theme of a heterosexual teenage boy becoming drawn into the LGBTQ community of New York. Schrag accepts the label of ‘dyke comic book artist’.

== Career ==
While attending Berkeley High School in Berkeley, California, Schrag self-published her first comic series, Awkward, depicting events from her first year, originally selling copies to friends and family. Schrag then published three more graphic novels based on her next three years of school: Definition, Potential, and Likewise. The comics describe Schrag's experiences with family life, going to concerts, drug-taking, high school crushes, and coming out as bisexual and later as lesbian.

Schrag graduated from high school in 1998. She graduated from Columbia University with a bachelor's degree in English in 2003, and has continued to work as a cartoonist and writer. Schrag was a writer for the third and fourth seasons of the Showtime series The L Word, and for the second season of the HBO series How To Make It in America.

The documentary Confession: A Film About Ariel Schrag was released in 2004. It explores the then-23-year-old Schrag's world in which she "negotiates fame, obsesses about disease, and discusses the way she sees as a dyke comic book artist."

Schrag is a part-time faculty member at The New School in Manhattan, where she teaches in the writing program. Schrag participates in the artistic community Yaddo, and the queer-centric creative retreat Radar Lab. In 2014, Schrag published her novel Adam, which in 2019 was adapted into a film of the same name.

== Works ==
=== High school comics ===
Slave Labor Graphics subsequently reprinted Awkward as a graphic novel. Her follow-up works Definition, Potential, and Likewise were republished by Touchstone/Simon & Schuster in 2008 and 2009.

In 2008 it was announced that Schrag had written the screenplay for Killer Films movie adaptation of Potential.

=== Adam ===
Adam is a coming-of-age story which follows Adam, a seventeen-year-old boy who comes to New York City to live with his older sister for the summer of 2006. Adam is straight and cisgender, but is introduced to the LGBTQ community of New York through his sister, an LGBTQ advocate. During his stay, he becomes attracted to a gay woman. After being mistaken for a transgender man, he decides to maintain the deception to date the woman.

In an interview with The Rumpus, Schrag stated that she was inspired to write Adam while working on the third season of The L Word. All of the writers on that season were lesbian women except one straight, cisgender man, Adam Rapp. Schrag found the situation unusual and imagined Rapp going to gay bars pretending to be a transgender man to collect material for writing on the show. She decided to write a novel based on the concept, initially picturing the character Adam as an adult male. Eventually she decided that it would be in poor taste, and revised the character as a love-struck teenager, stating she believed it was more sympathetic that way because "a teenager is clueless". She also mentioned having lesbian friends who were attracted to trans men, and thought that "a teenage boy could clean up if he got in there." Overall she was interested in the challenge of trying to write about a character doing inappropriate things but remaining sympathetic. In an interview with Brooklyn, she stated she was "intrigued by the idea of taking a standard YA formula — awkward teen boy finds love for the first time — and subverting it with unexpected explicit and hopefully thought-provoking content about gender and sexuality."

In addition to being inspired by co-worker Adam Rapp, Schrag drew inspiration from her experiences in the New York LGBT scene around 2006, while she was in her 20s. She started writing the book in 2007, and retained the setting even though the book was not released until 2014; it wound up a period piece as a result. Schrag has stated she feels this is to the book's benefit, as transgender issues were much less visible during the 2000s, meaning that Adam's ignorance about the transgender community was much more justifiable than it would be in a modern setting.

Schrag was also interested in exploring her perceptions of the LGBT community and the subtle prejudices its members may hold. Schrag addressed biphobia and heterophobia through the character Gillian, who was inspired by Constance McMillen. In 2010, McMillen was barred from attending her school's prom with her girlfriend. Schrag wondered how McMillen would feel if she later discovered she was attracted to men despite the heavy coverage of her as "a proud lesbian", and explored that through Gillian, a lesbian who comes to date Adam.

In an interview with Diva magazine, Schrag discussed the controversy generated by the story's unusual premise. She explained that the book was intended to be "satirical and nuanced", rather than being a typical story about the experience of being transgender. Speaking to Lambda Literary, she declared that the novel was intended to be provocative, for the purpose of sparking discussions about gender and sexual identity. She felt it was particularly important to write characters who acted realistically "obnoxious, self-involved, self-righteous, or entitled," regardless of their gender or sexuality. Some characters display prejudiced behaviors, even towards groups that they may be a part of, which Schrag included to highlight the hypocrisy of such behavior from people who may themselves be marginalized. Schrag has expressed frustration with people who have criticized the book's premise without first reading it; she feels it is unfair to do so and has asked people to refrain from forming an opinion before reading the book.

== Bibliography ==
- Definition, (1997, Slave Labor Graphics, ISBN 0-943151-14-7)
- Awkward, (1999, Slave Labor Graphics, magazine format)
- Potential, (2000, Slave Labor Graphics, ISBN 978-0-943151-04-5)
- Likewise (2000, Slave Labor Graphics, magazine format)
- Stuck in the Middle: Seventeen Comics From an Unpleasant Age (editor), (2007 Viking Press, May, ISBN 978-0-670-06221-8)
- Awkward and Definition: The High School Comic Chronicles of Ariel Schrag (2008, Touchstone, ISBN 978-1-4165-5231-4)
- Potential: The High School Comic Chronicles of Ariel Schrag (2008, Touchstone, ISBN 978-1-4165-5235-2)
- Likewise: The High School Comic Chronicles of Ariel Schrag (2009, Touchstone, ISBN 978-1-4165-5237-6)
- Adam: A Novel (2014, Houghton Mifflin Harcourt, ISBN 978-0-5441-4293-0)
- Part of It: Comics and Confessions (2018, Mariner Books)

=== Anthologies ===
- Juicy Mother, edited by Jennifer Camper, (2005, Soft Skull Press ISBN 1-932360-70-0)
- Juicy Mother 2: How They Met, edited by Jennifer Camper, (2007, Manic D Press, ISBN 978-1-933149-20-2)
- "Dyke March", in How Beautiful the Ordinary: Twelve Stories of Identity edited by Michael Cart, (2009, HarperTeen, 2009 ISBN 0-06-115498-9)
- No Straight Lines: Four Decades of Queer Comics, edited by Justin Hall, (2012, Fantagraphics Books, ISBN 9781606995068)

== In popular culture ==
Her name appears in the lyrics of the Le Tigre song "Hot Topic".

== See also ==
- LGBT culture in New York City
- List of LGBT people from New York City
- Alternative comics
