= Rhys Ernst =

American filmmaker

- Born: North Carolina, United States
- Education: Hampshire College (BA); California Institute of the Arts (MFA)
- Occupations: Director, producer
- Known for: Transparent (2014–2019); Adam (2019)

Rhys Ernst is an American film producer and director. A trans man, his work explores transgender identity. He is best known for his work on transgender-related television shows, serving as an associate producer on Transparent and the director of its documentary spin-off This is Me. He is also known for his controversial debut feature film Adam.

== Early life and education ==
Ernst transitioned at the age of 25. He has explained that media was his way of discovering queer identities, particularly MTV in his childhood and New Queer Cinema as he got older; these films also helped him "imagine a future" that seemed otherwise inaccessible from his hometown in North Carolina. He graduated from Hampshire College in 2004, with a BA in film; his graduation film was "The Drive North", which won an award at the Chicago International Film Festival. He then received a Master of Fine Arts from CalArts in 2011. His thesis film, "The Thing", premiered at Sundance Film Festival in 2012. Between degrees, he served as associate producer of the Logo series Coming Out Stories.

== Career ==
For several years, Ernst frequently creatively collaborated with Zackary Drucker, a trans woman who was also his partner at the time. They were included in the first iteration of the Hammer/LAX Art biennial in 2012, premiering the film "She Gone Rogue"; the film was also included in Outfest 2013. In 2014, Drucker and Ernst exhibited "Relationship" at the Whitney Museum of American Art, as part of the Whitney Biennial, through a series of photos that chronicled the process and evolution of the couple's relationship and gender transitions. In 2016, "Relationship" was released as a book.

The couple began working on Transparent early in its production after Ernst met creator Joey Soloway at Sundance in 2012. They came on as associate producers, working in the production, casting and writing departments, as well as helping design the title sequence, which features archival footage from trans moments in history including parts of 1968 film The Queen. Ernst was also involved editing the title sequence and can be briefly seen in it. According to The New York Times Magazine, Drucker and Ernst's goal with the show was to ensure that trans people are depicted authentically on screen, including doing research as to the historic distinctions and identities in transgender and cross-dressing communities. In 2015, Ernst directed This is Me, a series of short documentaries inspired by a line said when the main character in Transparent comes out and executive produced by Soloway. This is Me "expands on the transgender issues" explored in Transparent's first season. Drucker stars in an episode of the series, for which they were nominated for the Primetime Emmy Award for Outstanding Short Form Nonfiction or Reality Series.

In 2016, Ernst created another short documentary series. Called We've Been Around, the six episodes detail moments in trans history and look at how trans individuals were excluded from lesbian and gay spaces. His motivation to create the series was to open up trans history, an interest he says he naturally held as a trans person but was exaggerated when he couldn't find trans masculine role models. For the show, he brought on historians and they "worked hard to find the best and most complete stories [with] diversity across race, gender, era and region", but still acknowledged it was quite US-centric.

His directorial debut feature film was Adam in 2019. About half of the film's cast and crew were trans, with a majority of the cast being queer. The film received positive critical reviews upon its release at Sundance, but the outlook became more negative soon thereafter and the film was seen as controversial due to "queer missteps". Before the film was released, Ernst wrote a Medium article about his own apprehension about receiving the script and thinking it would be offensive, saying he was "pleasantly surprised". Ernst and the film were compared by them.'s Sarah Fonseca to Rainer Werner Fassbinder's Fox and His Friends (1975) and Jamie Babbit's But I'm a Cheerleader (2000) because of this negative response from the queer community it aims to represent. Adam is based on Ariel Schrag's 2014 novel of the same name, which was received with outcry from the trans community, as it follows a privileged white, heterosexual, cisgender man as he pretends to be a trans man so that he can date a lesbian. There were also "accusations of questionable on-set conduct." However, some queer critics also defended the film as art.

Ernst and critics defend Adam as having a nuance and being a reminder to trans people that life improved significantly in the time between its 2006 setting and 2019 release. Ernst has claimed that queer audiences at screenings react positively while the response from reviewers online "is so totally disparate and opposite from that. It's almost like cognitive dissonance", telling them. that appreciating the film is "really hard until people have a chance to see the film for themselves and really be able to have a real conversation about it", saying that he wants to start a conversation through the film. Hundreds of Twitter and Instagram posts, as well as several Change.org petitions, have called for the film to be boycotted or banned, due to being "deeply transphobic and lesbianphobic". BuzzFeed News describes the film as a "boundary-pushing artwork by and about underrepresented communities", with a representative of its distributor Wolfe Releasing and Ernst both saying they want to open a space for queer artists to tell whatever stories they want, with Ernst saying he especially does not want to be restricted to positive trans stories.

== Personal life and views ==
Ernst met Drucker when she had recently graduated from the School of Visual Arts in New York. Ernst had never dated a woman before, and Drucker had never dated a man. After they broke up, the former couple published photographs of them together from "Relationship" in 2016, which The New York Times stated was an important public record for transgender life.

While working on Transparent, Ernst spoke about his disappointment that though trans stories were increasingly being told in media, these were almost always stories of trans women, saying that, "within the trans community, there's a bit of pressure for trans masculine people to take the back seat." In the same interview, when asked about the casting of cisgender actor Jeffrey Tambor in the lead role, Ernst opined that when it is clear a work (comparing Transparent to Boys Don't Cry) has put in effort to be inclusive behind the camera and work on advancing trans causes, "the casting becomes less consequential".

== See also ==
- List of transgender film and television directors
