= Istanbul Tales =

- Theatrical Poster
- Directed by: Selim Demirdelen; Kudret Sabancı; Ümit Ünal; Yücel Yolcu; Ömür Atay
- Written by: Ümit Ünal
- Produced by: Erol Avcı
- Starring: Altan Erkekli; Özgü Namal; Azra Akın; Erkan Can; Hasibe Eren; Mehmet Günsur; Ozan Güven; Vahide Gördüm; Çetin Tekindor; Güven Kıraç; Nejat İşler; Yelda Reynaud; Nurgül Yeşilçay; Fikret Kuşkan
- Cinematography: Mehmet Aksın
- Music by: Gökhan Kırdar
- Production company: TMC Film
- Distributed by: Ishak Films
- Release date: 11 March 2005
- Running time: 99 minutes
- Country: Turkey
- Language: Turkish

Istanbul Tales (Turkish: Anlat İstanbul) is a 2006 Turkish drama-anthology film, directed by Selim Demirdelen, Kudret Sabancı, Ümit Ünal, Yücel Yolcu and Ömür Atay, which tells five interconnected stories set in modern-day Istanbul based on the fairytales Snow White, Cinderella, Pied Piper, Sleeping Beauty and Little Red Riding Hood. The film, which went on nationwide general release on 11 March 2005, won several awards including Best Film at the 24th International Istanbul Film Festival.

== Awards ==
The film won the Best Film of the Year and Best Actress (Yelda Reynaud) awards at the 2005 Istanbul International Film Festival, Special Jury Prize at the 2006 Bangkok International Film Festival and Jury Prize of "Artistic Expression" (Original Idea) at the 2005 MedFilm Festival in Rome.

== Cast ==
- Altan Erkekli as Hilmi, the Clarinetist
- Özgü Namal as Senay, his Wife
- Mehmet Günsür as Rifki, her Lover
- Erkan Can as Erkan, the Drummer
- Azra Akın as Idil
- Çetin Tekindor as Ihsan, the Mafia Boss
- Vahide Gördüm as Hurrem, the Wicked Queen
- Nejat İşler as Ramazan, the Killer
- Hilal Aslan as Dwarf #8
- Yelda Reynaud as Banu, the Transsexual
- Şevket Çoruh as Recep, her Pimp
- Given Kirac as Mimi, the Transvestite
- İsmail Hacıoğlu as Fiko
- Selen Ucer as Prostitute
- Hasibe Eren as Prostitute
- Nurgül Yeşilçay as Saliha, the Aristocrat
- Selim Akgul as Musa, the Kurd
- Erdem Akakce as Recai, Saliha's Brother
- İdil Üner as Melek
- Fikret Kuşkan as Rafet
- Ahmet Memtaz Taylan as TV Journalist
- Ece Hakim as Melek's Daughter
