= Umut Aral =

Turkish film director, screenwriter, producer

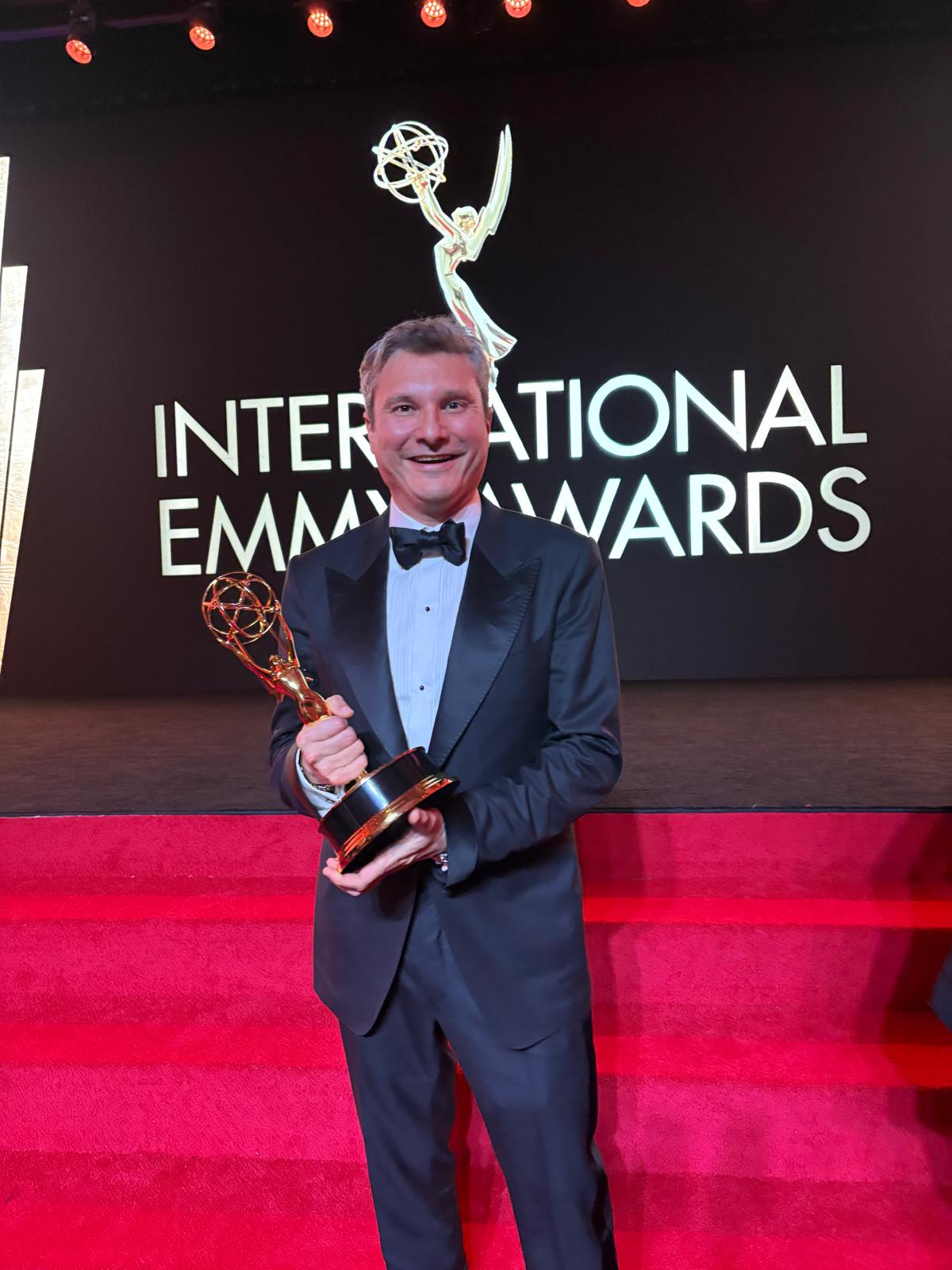
- International Emmy Awards December 2025
- Born: 26 June 1976 (age 50); Istanbul, Turkey
- Education: Galatasaray High School; Boğaziçi University
- Occupations: Film director, Screenwriter, Producer
- Website: umutaral.com

Umut Aral (born 26 June 1976) is an International Emmy Award winner Turkish film director, producer, and screenwriter best known for the Netflix Original The Protector., Love 101, Who Were We Running From? and his feature debut on esports 'Good Game: The Beginning'.

== Early life ==
Umut Aral was raised in Istanbul, Turkey. He attended Galatasaray High School and studied management at Boğaziçi University. He began making filmmaking at a young age. Started shooting short films at the age of thirteen. He can speak English, French and Turkish.

== Career ==
He is an established director in the commercial world, directed 300+ TV commercials, working for clients such as Coca-Cola, Pepsi, Mercedes-Benz, McDonald's, Nivea, Vodafone, Unilever, Nestle Nutricia and QMobile.

In 2017 Aral directed a docudrama for Galatasaray S.K. Museum. and also one episode of Turkish streaming platform BluTV original anthology series 7 Faces streaming on SBS Australia and HBOMax Latam.

In 2018, Aral directed the first Turkish language Netflix Series The Protector starring Çağatay Ulusoy, Ayca Aysin Turan, Hazar Erguclu and Okan Yalıbık for 4 consecutive seasons. The Protector became the 6th of most watched ‘Non- English TV shows’ in UK and 10th in US. The same year he also directed the first licensed esports feature film Good Game: The Beginning starring Mert Yazıcıoğlu, Afra Saraçoğlu and Kerem Bürsin. Aral has won The Best Director Award with Good Game: The Beginning in 46th Paladino d'Oro Sport Film Festival in 2025.

In 2020, Aral directed 4 episodes for the second and final season of Netflix Original Love 101 a Turkish teen comedy-drama, starring Mert Yazıcıoğlu, Kubilay Aka, Alina Boz, Selahattin Paşalı, İpek Filiz Yazıcı, Pınar Deniz, Kaan Urgancıoğlu and Ece Yüksel.

In 2022, he directed 4 episodes for Yakamoz S-245, the spin-off of Belgian apocalyptic sci-fi thriller Into The Night starring Kivanc Tatlitug, Ozge Ozpirincci and Ertan Saban. Yakamoz S-245 has been watched 22 million hours in four days following its global launch on Netflix. The series was reported to be the third most watched non-English TV series on Netflix.

In 2023, he directed the limited series, a psychological thriller based on Perihan Magden's book Who Were We Running From? starring Melisa Sözen and introducing Eylül Tumbar. The story of the series is about a mother (unnamed) and daughter (named Bambi) running from a mysterious past. The series was ranked #3 in the US, #4 in the UK, #2 in France and globally #1 as Non-English TV Shows on Netflix and stayed in the list for 4 weeks. The series has achieved a high viewership, accumulating almost 93 million hours on the platform.

In 2024, he produced and directed a feature length sports documentary 'Arda Turan: Confrontation' for Amazon Prime about the controversial football player Arda Turan. The documentary features international football superstar guest speakers from Atletico Madrid and FC Barcelona such as Neymar, Andrés Iniesta, Gerard Pique, Koke, Ivan Rakitic, Filipe Luis, Diego Simeone, and Miguel Ángel Gil Marín.

In 2024 and 2025, he directed the TV series Deha (also known as The Good and the Bad) for Show TV. Starring Aras Bulut İynemli, Uğur Polat, Taner Olmez, Onur Saylak, Melis Sezen, and Ahsen Eroğlu, The Good & The Bad premiered in September, delivering the strongest debut of the season. Additionally, the show ranked among the top five series with the highest rating increases in its second episode. The series won the Best Series Award at the Seoul International Drama Awards and the International Emmy Award for Best Telenovela.

He has been a speaker and educator, invited as a guest speaker to global organizations like YPO and by universities to run workshops on filmmaking.

Umut Aral is also The Chairman of Board of Members of Mithat Alam Education Foundation and Mithat Alam Film Center - the 'cinematheque', a prestigious cultural center in Istanbul.

== Filmography ==
Year	Title	Director	Writer	Producer	Notes
2000	thirtyfour	Yes	Yes	Yes	Short Film
2006	Crash	Yes	Yes	Yes	Short Film
2017	7 Faces	Yes	No	No	BluTV SBS HBOMax TV Series
2018	Good Game: The Beginning	Yes	No	No	Feature Debut
2018-2020	The Protector	Yes	No	No	Netflix Original
2021	Love 101	Yes	No	No	Netflix Original
2022	Yakamoz S-245	Yes	No	No	Netflix Original (Spin-off of Into The Night)
2023	Who Were We Running From?	Yes	No	No	Netflix Original adapted from Perihan Mağden
2023	Karantina	Yes	No	No	Created by Adi Hasak starring James Franco
2024	Arda Turan: Confrontation	Yes	No	Yes	Amazon Prime Documentary
2024-2025	Deha	Yes	No	No	Show TV TV Series

== Awards ==
=== Deha (aka The Good & The Bad) (2024-2025) ===
Awards include the Best Series Award at the Seoul International Drama Awards as well as the International Emmy Award for Best Telenovela.

=== Good Game: The Beginning (2018) ===
Awards include Best Director Award in Paladino d'Oro Sport Film Festival, Best Feature Film Award in Beirut International Children & Family Film Festival, Special Jury Remi Award (Family /Children Section) in WorldFest-Houston International Film Festival, Young Audience Award (Teen Arena) in Sarajevo International Film Festival, Award of Excellence Special Mention (Children / Family Programming) in Accolade Global Film Competition.

=== Crash (2006) ===
Awards include Best Director Award in L'Isola del Cinema Festival Del Corto, Global Audience Award in CON-CAN Movie Festival, Best Foreign Film Award in Action/Cut Short Film Competition, Best Fiction & Special Audience Awards in Boston Turkish Film Festival, Best Film Award in Metro Group National Short Film Competition, Best Film Golden Cat Award in Izmir International Short Film Festival, Jury Special Award in !f Istanbul AFM International Independent Film Festival and official selections in Locarno International Film Festival, Drama International Short Film Festival, Raindance Film Festival.

=== thirtyfour (2000) ===
Awards include Best Short Film Award in İFSAK Short Film Festival, Best Short Film Award in Cine5 National Short Film Competition and Best Short Film Award in Marmara University Short Film Competition.
