= CON-CAN Movie Festival =

Online international short film festival

Coordinates: 35°40′36″N 139°42′29″E

- Type: Film festival produced by Media Research, Inc.
- Industry: Film festival, Motion pictures
- Founded: Sendagaya, Tokyo, Japan (2005)
- Headquarters: Sendagaya, Tokyo, Japan
- Key people: Masahiro Yoshino, Chairman; Nofil Iqbal, Director
- Website: http://en.con-can.com

CON-CAN Movie Festival (CON-CAN) is an audience-interactive online international short film festival which aims to “discover hidden creative talent from all over the world, enabling image creators and a global audience. To share the underlying messages and sheer creativity expressed in profound short movie productions”. Founded in 2005, the short film festival enables users to watch short movies for free on its site. The festival's award ceremony is held annually in Tokyo, Japan.

== History ==
The idea for the CON-CAN Movie Festival was founded by Masahiro Yoshino, CEO of Media Research, Inc. Media Research, Inc. launched the festival online in 2005. The name CON-CAN was first thought of in Japanese (魂観). CON(魂) is said to represent the soul and CAN(観) to represent viewers watching with “true appreciation”.

The first CON-CAN Movie Festival was held in 2005 with two types of awards; one, an Audience Award that is presented by viewers, the other a “Grand Prix” award (awarded to the best short movie). Two “Tamashii” awards (special jury awards decided by the CON-CAN International Jury). A total of 151 short movies from 25 countries were submitted. Since then, CON-CAN was reported to have received over 550 submissions from over 50 countries in 2008.

== Selection process ==
Once the submission deadline passes, the process of selecting the movies for the movie festival begins. The programming department at CON-CAN is responsible for a preliminary screening of the movies. The most highly ranked 80 movies out of all the submitted movies are selected to be part of the festival.

The movie festival then branches off into two parts. One part consists of the 80 movies being passed through a first round evaluation and judged by a domestic (Japanese) jury. These preliminary jury members select 20 movies to be considered for the final evaluation process. In the final evaluation round, international jury members selected by the CON-CAN staff select the top three nominations to be awarded the Grand Prix award (the best short movie) and the two Tamashii awards (special jury awards). The winner of the Grand Prix award and the two Tamashii award winners are invited to Tokyo with travel and accommodations paid for in order to attend the award ceremony. The award ceremony hosts famous people from the movie industry and notable news networks.

Another part consists of the 80 movies being categorized into four groups. Each group is independently displayed on CON-CAN's website. During this time, registered voters are able to watch free movies and animations, rate the movies and comment on them. The movie with the highest rating in each category is awarded an Audience Award.

== Awards ==
=== Grand Prix Winners ===
Year	Movie	Director	Nationality of Director (at time of movie's release)
2009	Fleeting Images	Edmund Yeo	Malaysia
2008	Ata	Cagla Zencirci & Guillaume Giovanetti	France
2007	The Pond	Huang Ying	China
2006 (October)	Gospel of The Creole Pig	Michelange Quay	France
2006 (April)	Perkele	Arto Tuohimaa	Finland
2005	Ohayo	Shinya Okada	Japan

=== Tamashii Award Winners ===
Year	Movie	Director	Nationality of Director (at time of movie's release)
2008	Chain Gestures (Gestos em Cadeia)	Carla Mota	Portugal
2008	On Earth as It Is in Heaven	Hervé Demers	Canada
2007	Nasja	Rios Guillermo	Spain
2007	A Shift in Perception	Dan Monceaux	Australia
2006 (October)	Broad Day	Rajeev Ahuja	India
2006 (October)	Love Me or Leave Me Alone	Duane Hopkins	United Kingdom
2006 (April)	The Chamber	Yu Seock-hyun	Republic of Korea
2006 (April)	Sister	Daniel Mulloy	United States
2005	Demon	Irina Evteeva	Russia
2005	Djamel's Eyes	David Casals-Roma	Spain

=== Audience Award Winners ===
Year	Movie	Director(s)	Nationality of Director(s) (at time of movie's release)
2010 (December)	In my prison	Alessandro Grande	Italy
2008	Walk with her	Yoshiki Uematsu	Japan
2008	Ata	Cagla Zencirci & Guillaume Giovanetti	France
2008	Ersatz	Alexander Adler	Israel
2008	EL VESTIDO	Evelyne Pegot-Ogier	Peru
2007	4 1/4	Aundre Johnson	United States
2007	A Shift in Perception	Dan Monceaux	Australia
2007	The Clearing	Pedro Touceda	Spain
2007	The Spirit Child	Elinor Geller	United Kingdom
2006 (October)	Crash	Umut Aral	Turkey
2006 (April)	Sister	Daniel Mulloy	United Kingdom
2005	Hair Sapiens	Tsuyoshi Nakakuki	Japan
2005	Out of Time	Blake Ritson; Dylan Ritson	United Kingdom

== Jury ==
The international jury which chooses the three movies during the final evaluation round features famous people from the movie industry. Below are the juries from previous years.

=== The 6th CON-CAN Movie Festival ===
- Chris Fujiwara (Film critic)
- Jukka-Pekka Laakso (Chairman of the Tampere Film Festival)
- Ngo Phuong Lan (Chairperson of the Council of Theory and Criticism at the Vietnam Cinema Association)
- Naomi Kawase (Filmmaker)
- Matthieu Darras (Programmer of the Cannes Critics' Week)

=== The 5th CON-CAN Movie Festival ===
- Chris Fujiwara (Film critic)
- Jukka-Pekka Laakso (Chairman of the Tampere Film Festival)
- Kitaro Kanematsu (President of the Japanese Society of Cinematographers (Japan))
- Michael Renov (Professor of Critical Studies and Associate Dean of the University of Southern California School of Cinematic Arts)
- Hui-jun Zhang (President of the Beijing Film Academy)

=== The 4th CON-CAN Movie Festival ===
- Jukka-Pekka Laakso (Chairman of the Tampere Film Festival)
- Chihong (Lecturer at the Beijing Film Academy)
- Vincent Malausa (Film critic for Cahiers du cinéma)
- Tapan Sinha (Film director for the Bengali film industry)
- Chris Fujiwara (Film critic)

=== The 3rd CON-CAN Movie Festival ===
- Jean-Michel Frodon (Journalist, film critic and cinema historian)
- Masahiro Kobayashi (Film director in Japan)
- Jukka-Pekka Laakso (Chairman of the Tampere Film Festival)
- Dennis Lim (Film critic and film editor for Village Voice)
- Amir Naderi (Film director in Iran/USA)

=== The 2nd CON-CAN Movie Festival ===
- Babak Payami (Film director in Iran/Canada)
- Dennis Lim (Film critic and film editor for Village Voice)
- Hou Hsiao-hsien (Film director in Taiwan)
- Jean-Michel Frodon (Journalist, film critic and cinema historian)
- Jukka-Pekka Laakso (Chairman of the Tampere Film Festival)
- Peter Millynn (Production executive at the Australian Film Television and Radio School)
- Teruyo Nogami (Production manager of Kurosawa Production Co. (Japan))

=== The 1st CON-CAN Movie Festival ===
- Babak Payami (Film director in Iran/Canada)
- Dennis Lim (Film critic and film editor for Village Voice)
- Fei Zhao (Professor at the Beijing Film Academy)
- Jean-Michel Frodon (Journalist, film critic and cinema historian)
- Jukka-Pekka Laakso (Chairman of the Tampere Film Festival)
- Peter Millynn (Production executive at the Australian Film Television and Radio School)
- Shoichiro Sasaki (Director of Audio and Visual Images)
