= Arda Anarat =

Turkish actor

- Born: 2 April 1999 (age 27); Istanbul, Turkey
- Occupation: Actor
- Years active: 2012–present

Arda Anarat (born 2 April 1999) is a Turkish actor.

== Life and career ==
Anarat was born in Istanbul and is originally from Bafra, Samsun. He moved to central Turkey for his acting career, later returning to Istanbul. Anarat graduated from Notre Dame De Sion French High School and started his acting career in the TV series Muhteşem Yüzyıl with the role of Şehzade Mehmed. Arda Anarat, who starred in the famous TV-series Diriliş: Ertuğrul for two seasons, played the role of Umut in Tek Yürek, Efe in Çukur, and Berk in Bilmemek which came to the screens in 2019. Between 2021 and 2024, he portrayed Çınar Kaya in the Turkish drama series Yargı alongside Pınar Deniz and Kaan Urgancıoğlu.

== Filmography ==
Films
Year	Title	Role
2018	Zomerbroeders	Tolga
2023	Nefes: Yer Eksi Iki	Ali
Television
2012	Muhteşem Yüzyıl	Şehzade Mehmed
2014	Galip Derviş	Young Musa Kilimder
2014–2016	Diriliş: Ertuğrul	Dündar Bey
2017	Nomad	Karan
2017	Damat Takimi	Liseli Ömer
2018	Wounded Love	
2017–2018	Çukur	Efe
2019	Tek Yürek	Umut Kara
2021–2024	Yargı	Çınar Kaya
2022	Sıcak Kafa	Arif
2025–present	Taşacak Bu Deniz	Young Adil Koçari
