= Helin Kandemir =

Turkish actress (born 2004)

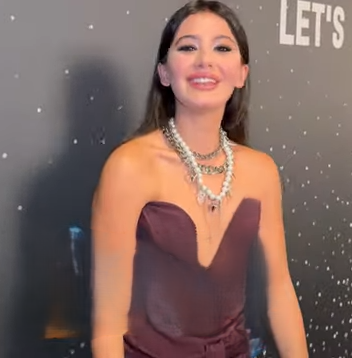
- Born: 2 June 2004 (age 22); Istanbul, Turkey
- Occupations: Actress; model
- Years active: 2017–present
- Height: 1.67 m (5 ft 5.75 in)

Helin Kandemir (born 2 June 2004) is a Turkish actress and model.

== Early life ==
Helin Kandemir was born on 2 June 2004, in Istanbul, Turkey, to mother, Ebru Uğurlu, and father, Murat Kandemir. The latter died on 27 February 2023, at the age of forty-seven, while undergoing treatment for leukemia. She also has a younger sister.

== Career ==
Helin Kandemir started acting at the age of nine on stage and graduated from high school in 2017. In the same year, she made her acting debut after being cast as Pelin Akıncı in the series aired on Kanal D İsimsizler. In 2018, she voiced the character of Ezran in the Netflix animated web series Ejderhalar Prensi, the character of Sam in the film Hızlı ve Öfkeli: Hobbs ve Shaw (Fast & Furious Presents: Hobbs & Shaw) and the character of Genç Shirley in the Netflix web series The Haunting: Tepedeki Ev (The Haunting of Hill House).

In 2018 and 2019 she played the role of Elif Yürekli in the Kanal D series Bir Litre Gözyaşı and the role of Ceylan in the Netflix web series The Protector (Hakan: Muhafız). In 2019, she lent her voice to the character of Nala as a child in the animated film Aslan Kral (The Lion King). In the same year she played the role of Havva in the film A Tale of Three Sisters (Kız Kardeşler) directed by Emin Alper. For the latter film, she won the Best Actress award at the International Istanbul Film Festival.

From 2019 to 2021 she was chosen to play the role of Kibrit / Dilara in the series broadcast on TV8 Doğduğun Ev Kaderindir, in which she co-starred with actors Demet Özdemir, İbrahim Çelikkol and Engin Öztürk. In 2020, she voiced the character Daphne as a child in the animated film ¡Scooby! (Scoob!) and the character of Madeleine in the Netflix web series La Révolution. The following year, in 2021, she played the role of Cemre Fırtına in the series aired on Star TV Kağıt Ev and the role of Mevsim Baykan in the series aired on Fox Elbet Bir Gün. In the same year, she played the role of Cansu in the Netflix film Stuck Apart (Azizler) directed by Durul Taylan and Yağmur Taylan.

In 2022 she joined the cast of the series broadcast on Star TV Duy Beni (in the role of Leyla Pinar) and the cast of the Netflix web series Rise of Empires: Ottoman (in the role of Elena). In the same year she played the role of Hande in the Netflix film Private Lesson (Özel Ders) directed by Kivanç Baruönü. In the same year she voiced the character of Meilin "Mei" Lee in the animated series Kırmızı (Turning Red), the character of Erin Tieng in the Prime Video web series Paper Girls, the character of Gaby in the Netflix web series Cennete Hoş Geldiniz (Welcome to Eden), the character of María Guadalupe in the Disney+ web series Siempre fui yo (It Was Always Me), the character of Carol in the Disney+ web series All the Same... or Not, the character of Moya in the Netflix animated film Riverdance: Animasyon Macera and the character Gia in the Netflix web series Boo, Bitch. In 2023, she won the Altın 61 Award for Best Supporting Actress of the Year for the series Duy Beni, the web series Rise of Empires: Ottoman and the film Private Lesson (Özel Ders). In the same year she played the role of Nihal in the Prime Video film Bither directed by Mehmet Binay and Caner Alper.

== Filmography ==
=== Actress ===
==== Film ====
Year	Title	Role	Director
2019	A Tale of Three Sisters (Kız Kardeşler)	Havva	Emin Alper
2021	Stuck Apart (Azizler)	Cansu	Durul Taylan and Yagmur Taylan
2022	Private Lesson (Özel Ders)	Hande	Kivanç Baruönü
2023	Bihter	Nihal	Mehmet Binay and Caner Alper
2025	İstanbul Ansiklopedisi	Zehra	Selman Nacar
2025	Aşkin Yüzü	Özlem Demiray	Emre Erdogdu
2026	Djinn Wedding (Cinlerin Düğünü)		Ferit Karahan

==== Television ====
Year	Title	Role	Network	Notes
2017	İsimsizler	Pelin Akıncı	Kanal D	13 episodes
2018–2019	Bir Litre Gözyaşı	Elif Yürekli	Kanal D	15 episodes
2019–2021	Doğduğun Ev Kaderindir	Kibrit / Dilara	TV8	34 episodes
2021	Kağıt Ev	Cemre Fırtına	Star TV	8 episodes
2021	Elbet Bir Gün	Mevsim Baykan	Fox	6 episodes
2022	Duy Beni	Leyla Pinar	Star TV	20 episodes
2024–2025	Şakir Paşa Ailesi: Mucizeler ve Skandallar	Sümbül	NOW	15 episodes
2026–present	Sevdiğim Sensin	Dicle Aldur (née Demir)	Star TV	

==== Web series ====
Year	Title	Role	Platform	Notes
2018–2019	The Protector (Hakan: Muhafız)	Ceylan	Netflix	6 episodes
2022	Rise of Empires: Ottoman	Elena	Netflix	4 episodes
2026	Çiçekçi Kiz	Nilüfer	TOD (Streaming Platform)	13 episodes (In production)

=== Voice actress ===
==== Film ====
Year	Title	Role	Director
2018	Hızlı ve Öfkeli: Hobbs ve Shaw (Fast & Furious Presents: Hobbs & Shaw)	Sam	David Leitch
2019	Aslan Kral (The Lion King)	Nala child	Jon Favreau
2020	¡Scooby! (Scoob!)	Daphne child	Tony Cervone
2022	Kırmızı (Turning Red)	Meilin "Mei" Lee	Domee Shi
2022	Riverdance: Animasyon Macera	Moya	Dave Rosenbaum

==== Web series ====
Year	Title	Role	Platform
2018	Ejderhalar Prensi	Ezran	Netflix
2018	The Haunting: Tepedeki Ev (The Haunting of Hill House)	Genç Shirley	Netflix
2020	La Révolution	Madeleine	Netflix
2022	Paper Girls	Erin Tieng	Prime Video
2022	Cennete Hoş Geldiniz (Welcome to Eden)	Gaby	Netflix
2022	Siempre fui yo (It Was Always Me)	María Guadalupe	Disney+
2022	All the Same... or Not	Carol	Disney+
2022	Boo, Bitch	Gia	Netflix

== Awards ==
Year	Award	Category	Trabajo	Result	Notes
2019	International Istanbul Film Festival	Best actress	A Tale of Three Sisters (Kız Kardeşler)	Won	
2023	Altın 61 Award	Best supporting actress of the year	Duy Beni	Won	
2023	Altın 61 Award	Best supporting actress of the year	Rise of Empires: Ottoman	Won	
2023	Altın 61 Award	Best supporting actress of the year	Private Lesson (Özel Ders)	Won	
