= Ece Yüksel =

Turkish actress

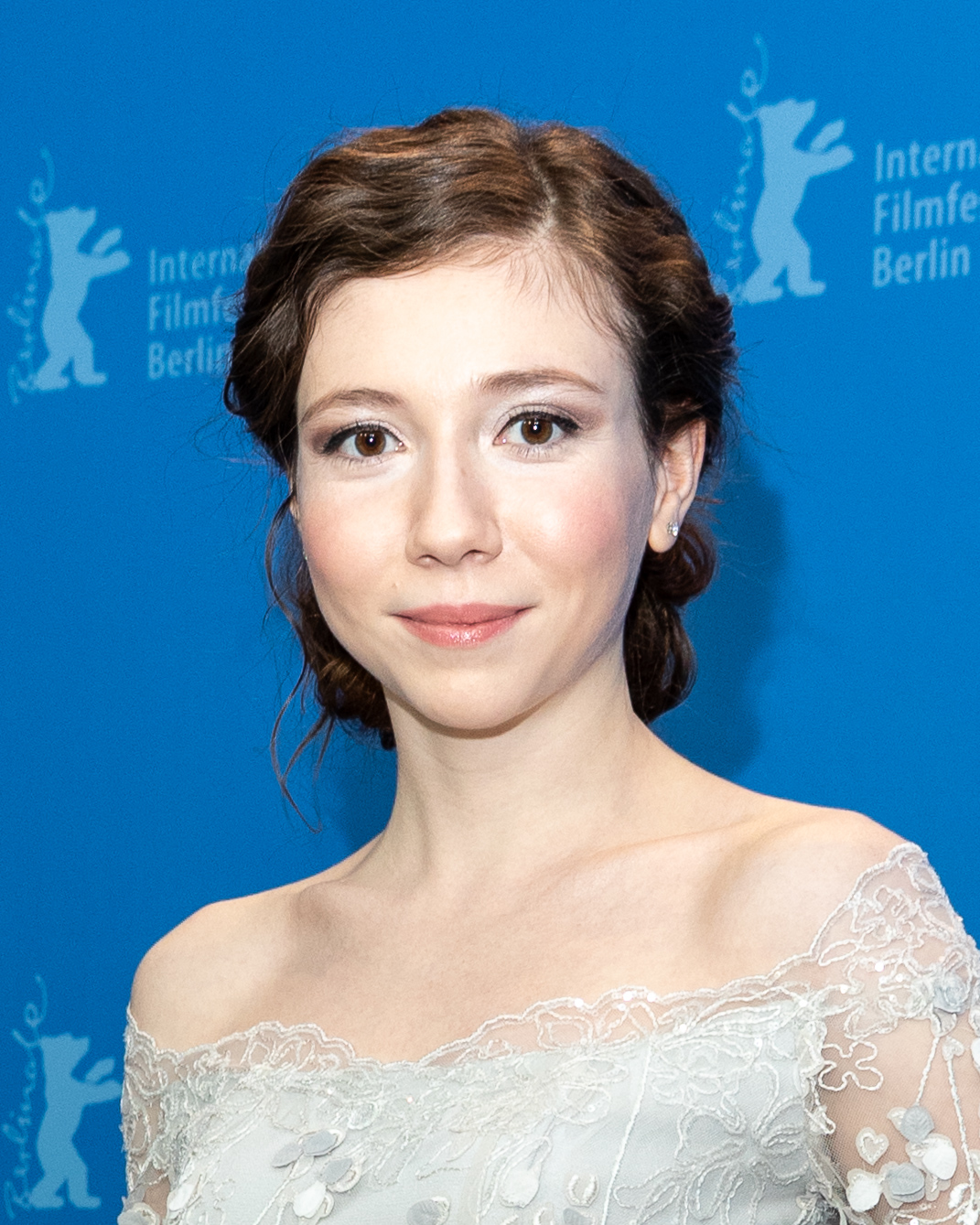
- Ece Yüksel, 2019
- Born: 6 October 1997 (age 28); Istanbul, Turkey
- Education: Kadir Has University
- Occupation: Actress
- Years active: 2008–present
- Spouse: Martin Wevers (m. 2022)

Ece Yüksel (born 6 October 1997) is a Turkish actress best known for her roles in the movie Kız Kardeşler (2019) and the Netflix original series Aşk 101 (2021).

== Life and career ==
Yüksel was born in 1997 in Istanbul. She had a degree in theatre studies from Kadir Has University. In 2014, she received acting lessons at Craft Acting Workshop before taking courses at Erasmus University Rotterdam. Her parents initially did not encourage her to pursue a career in acting, but due to her persistence they had her registered for theatre workshops at the age of 7. Her first role in front of the camera was an appearance in the TV series Bıçak Sırtı. She made her cinematic debut in 2010 with the movie Av Mevsimi in which she had the role of İdris's daughter. Her breakthrough came with the movie Nefesim Kesilene Kadar (2015) for which she received multiple accolades. In 2021, she had a leading role in the second and final season of Netflix original series Aşk 101. She is portraying İnci in the Turkish drama series Yargı alongside Pınar Deniz and Kaan Urgancıoğlu.

== Filmography ==
=== Film ===
| Year | Title | Role | Notes | Ref(s) |
|---|---|---|---|---|
| 2010 | Hunting Season | | | |
| 2015 | Nefesim Kesilene Kadar | Funda | | |
| 2015 | Çekmeceler | | | |
| 2016 | Davetsiz Misafir | | Short film | |
| 2019 | A Tale of Three Sisters | Nurhan | | |
| 2019 | Commitment | Gulnihal | | |
| 2020 | Mamaville | Ferah | Short film | |
| 2020 | Benden Korkmana Gerek Yok | | Short film | |
| 2022 | Ela with Hilmi and Ali | Ela | | |
| 2022 | Three Thousand Years of Longing | Gülten | | |
| 2023 | Behind Closed Doors | | | |
| 2024 | 8x8 | Eda | | |

=== Television ===
| Year | Title | Role | Notes | Ref(s) |
|---|---|---|---|---|
| 2008 | Bıçak Sırtı | Ömür | | |
| 2009 | Güldünya | | | |
| 2012 | The Magnificent Century | | Cameo | |
| 2015 | Cherry Season | Senacan Karayli | | |
| 2021 | Yargı | İnci | | |
| 2021 | Aşk 101 | Elif | | |
| 2024 | My Wonderful Life | Deniz Karaca | | |

== Awards ==
- 22nd Golden Boll Film Festival - Türkan Şoray Promising Young Actress Award (Nefesim Kesilene Kadar)
- 19th Flying Broom International Women's Film Festival - Young Witch Award (Nefesim Kesilene Kadar)
- 21st Sadri Alışık Theatre and Cinema Awards - Ekrem Bora Promising Actor Award (Nefesim Kesilene Kadar)
