= UFO (2022 film) =

2022 Turkish film

- Directed by: Onur Bilgetay
- Written by: Meryem Gültabak
- Starring: İpek Filiz Yazıcı; Mert Ramazan Demir; Ferit Aktuğ
- Distributed by: Netflix
- Release date: 23 February 2022
- Running time: 109 minutes
- Country: Turkey
- Language: Turkish

UFO is a 2022 Turkish film directed by Onur Bilgetay, written by Meryem Gültabak and starring İpek Filiz Yazıcı, Mert Ramazan Demir and Ferit Aktuğ. The film was released on 23 February 2022 on Netflix.

== Cast ==
- İpek Filiz Yazıcı
- Mert Ramazan Demir
- Ferit Aktuğ
- Nilsu Yılmaz
- Elif Çakman
- Cemile Çiğdem Canyurt
- Eda Akalın
- Mekin Sezer
- Enes Küllahçi
- Kerem Alp Kabul
- Görkem Ökten
