= A Tale of Three Sisters =

2019 film

- Film poster
- Turkish: Kız Kardeşler
- Directed by: Emin Alper
- Written by: Emin Alper
- Starring: Cemre Ebuzziya
- Release date: 11 February 2019 (Berlin)
- Country: Turkey
- Language: Turkish

A Tale of Three Sisters (Turkish: Kız Kardeşler, lit. 'Sisters') is a 2019 Turkish drama film directed by Emin Alper. It was selected to compete for the Golden Bear at the 69th Berlin International Film Festival.

== Cast ==
- Cemre Ebuzziya as Reyhan
- Ece Yüksel as Nurhan
- Helin Kandemir as Havva
- Müfit Kayacan as Sevket
