= Midnight at the Pera Palace =

Turkish TV series

- Turkish: Pera Palas'ta Gece Yarısı
- Genre: Period drama
- Based on: Midnight at the Pera Palace: The Birth of Modern Istanbul by Charles King
- Written by: Elif Usman
- Directed by: Emre Şahin; Nisa Dağ
- Starring: Hazal Kaya; Tansu Biçer; Selahattin Paşalı; James Chalmers
- Country of origin: Turkey
- Original language: Turkish
- No. of seasons: 2
- No. of episodes: 16

Production
- Production companies: Netflix; Karga Seven Pictures

Original release
- Network: Netflix
- Release: 3 March 2022 – present

Midnight at the Pera Palace (Turkish: Pera Palas'ta Gece Yarısı), is a Turkish time travel historical drama television series directed by Emre Şahin starring Hazal Kaya, Tansu Biçer, Selahattin Paşalı and James Chalmers. The show was released on Netflix on March 3, 2022, with the first season consisting of 8 episodes. Centered around the real-life Pera Palace Hotel, the series was inspired by the 2014 historical non-fiction book Midnight at the Pera Palace: The Birth of Modern Istanbul by Charles King. The series was renewed for a second season, which aired on September 12, 2024.

== Premise ==
Esra, a young orphaned journalist in modern-day Istanbul, is assigned to write an article about the upcoming 130th anniversary of the Pera Palace Hotel. At the hotel, she meets its manager, Ahmet, who shows her around and explains the history of the Pera Palace and some of its famous guests. Esra is particularly intrigued by the story of Peride, a young woman who apparently saved Mustafa Kemal from an assassination plot orchestrated by the British in 1919, during the occupation of Istanbul.

What Ahmet conceals from her is that, in combination with a mysterious key, one of the hotel's rooms becomes a time-travelling portal. That night, Esra accidentally time travels back to 1919, where she is soon mistaken for her apparent doppelgänger, Peride. Her encounters with men such as George, a scheming British officer, Halit, an enigmatic nightclub owner, and Reşat, a police officer in love with Peride leave her struggling to know whom to trust. Together with Ahmet, however, she must find a way to stop the assassination attempt on Mustafa Kemal and preserve the course of Turkey's independence.

== Cast and characters ==
=== Main ===
- Hazal Kaya as Esra, an orphaned journalist in 2022 who is accidentally transported to the year 1919. As a result of her traveling, she alters the timelines and falls in love with Halit. She struggles to find the true identity of her birth parents and how she is related to Peride.
  - Eslem Kazacan portrays a young Esra in season 2.
  - as Peride, a young woman who had saved Mustafa Kemal's life in the original timeline, but is murdered as a result of Esra's time traveling (season 1)
- Tansu Biçer as Ahmet, the manager of the modern Pera Palace and the son of Halit and Sonia
- Selahattin Paşalı as Halit, a nightclub owner that mysteriously knows Esra upon their first meet
- Yasemin Szawlowski as Sonia, a maid at the Pera Palace in 1919 that is in love with Halit (main season 1; guest season 2)
- Engin Hepileri as Reşat, a police officer that was in love with Peride (season 1)
- James Chalmers as George, a British Army officer that was plotting the assassination of Mustafa Kemal (season 1)
- Güven Murat Akpınar as Mümtaz, the leader of a misogynistic cult that wishes to revoke all women's rights (season 2)

=== Recurring ===
- Ebrar Alya Demirbilek as young Leyla, the daughter of Peride (season 1)
  - Bilgesu Akin as adult Leyla (guest season 1; recurring season 2)
- Nergis Öztürk as Madame Eleni, the owner of a lady's house and a landlord
- Hakan Dinçkol as Mustafa Kemal Atatürk, the future founder of the Republic of Turkey (season 1)
- Ahmet Varlı as Dimitri, a fellow timetraveler and guardian of the keys (season 1)
- Osman Albayrak as Naim Efendi, an Ottoman Turkish mintmaster and the father of the socialite Peride (season 1; guest season 2)
- Nezaket Erden as Meliah, a journalist investigating the mysterous disappearances of women in 1944 (season 2)
- Erol Babaoğlu as Kadri, a police officer in 1944 (season 2)
- Tülin Özen as Lili, a singer at the Pera Palace in 1944 and Ahmet's love interest (season 2)
- Haydar Deniz Şahin as Selahattin, a photographer in 1944 (season 2)
- Daniel Copeland as Alfred Hitchcock, famed director that is residing at the Pera Palace and getting his film idea's from his experiences (season 2)

=== Guest ===
- Clare Louise Frost as Agatha Christie (season 1)
- Ergün Metin as Fahrettin, an Ottoman Army officer and Turkish nationalist (season 1)

== Episodes ==
Season	Episodes	Originally released
1	8	March 3, 2022
2	8	September 12, 2024
