= Engin Hepileri =

Turkish actor and theatre director (born 1978)

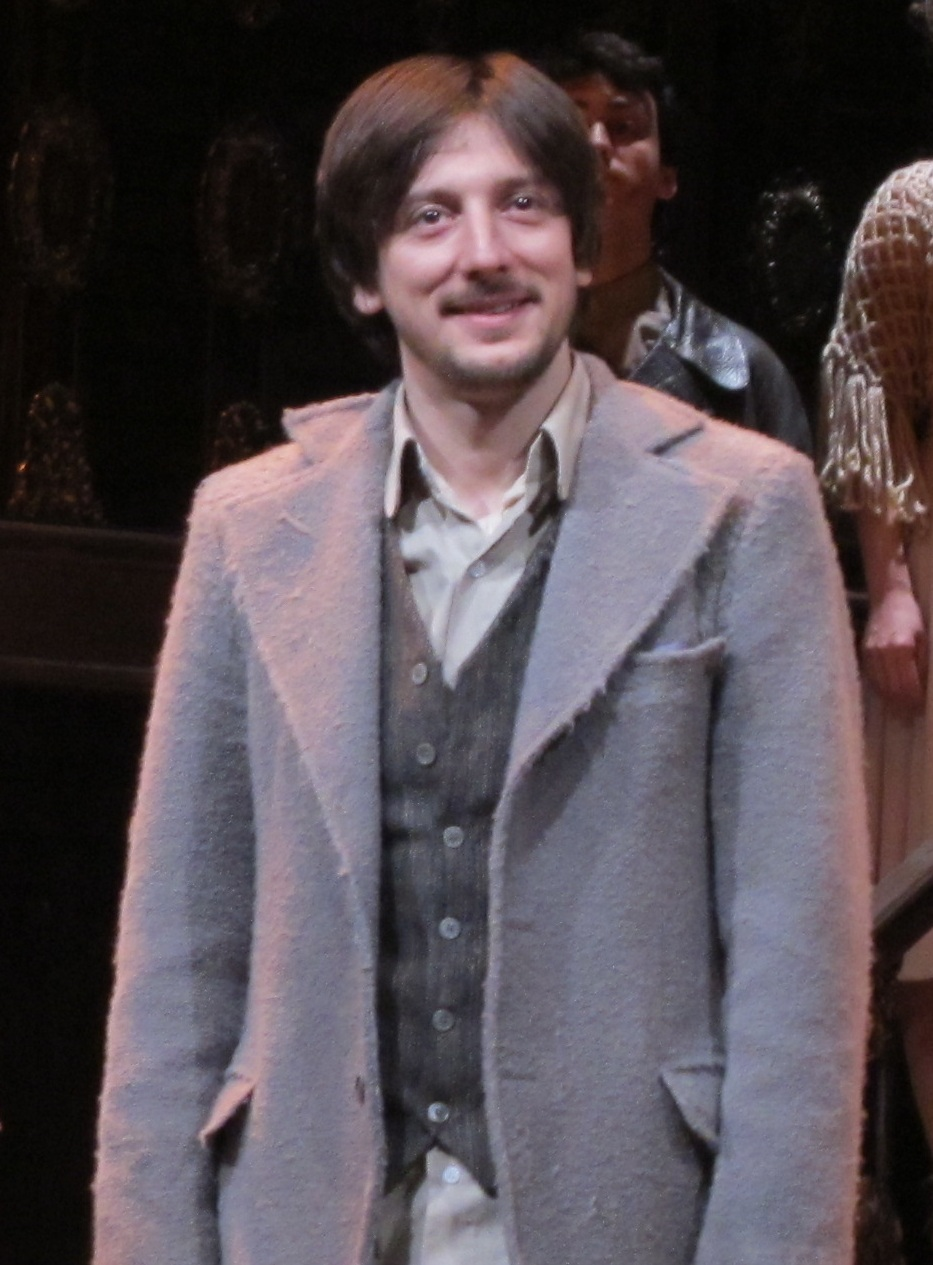
- Hepileri performing on stage in 2012
- Born: 3 March 1978 (age 47); Istanbul, Turkey
- Occupations: Actor, theatre director, TV presenter
- Years active: 1996–present
- Spouses: Ayşe Topçu (m. 2011; div. 2014) Beyza Şekerci (m. 2015)
- Children: 1

Engin Hepileri (born 3 March 1978) is a Turkish actor and theatre director.

He is best known for hit military comedy "Emret Komutanım", youth series "Kampüsistan" and İntikam adaptation of Revenge. He portrayed singer Kazım Koyuncu and played in many festival films. He also had guest roles in many hit series "Yılan Hikayesi", "Yedi Numara", "Gece Gündüz", "Bu Kalp Seni Unutur Mu", "Yaprak Dökümü", "Hürrem Sultan", "Gönül Çelen", "Kızlar Yurdu".

After joining the cast of Kent Oyuncuları on stage, he started to appear in various theatre plays. In 2008 he started working as a theatre director. He also briefly worked as a TV presenter on TRT 1, presenting the Altın Petek TV program.

== Career ==
Hepileri had his first experience on stage while being a student at Cağaloğlu Anadolu Lisesi, and in 1996 he enrolled in the Istanbul University State Conservatory. In 2002, he started studying for a master's degree in acting in the same institution and worked there as a research assistant until 2005.

While in high school, he appeared in four plays organized by the Turkish State Theatres. In 1998, he was cast in the Anlat Şehrazat musical and later played a character in the play Ölümsüzler at Theatre Fora. In the same year, he joined the cast of Kent Oyuncuları and appeared in 20 plays organized by this company. Meanwhile, he started to pursue a career in cinema and television.

In 2008, he began directing theatre plays and worked as a faculty member for Istanbul University and Academy Kenter. Between 2011 and 2012, he presented a culture-art themed program during weekdays on TRT Okul channel.

== Filmography ==
=== Film ===
- Gülüm (2002)
- Beyza'nın Kadınları (2005) - Hüseyin
- Gelin (2006)
- Başımın Belası (2007)
- Şöhretin Bedeli (2007)
- Son Ders: Aşk ve Üniversite (2007) - Hakan/Saffet
- İdam (2007)
- Nefes (2009)
- Başımın Belası (2010) - Onur Öztürk
- Av Mevsimi (2010) - Asiye's boss
- Tek Ölüm Yetmez Kısa Film (2011) - Cem
- Celal Tan ve Ailesinin Aşırı Acıklı Hikayesi (2011) - Deputy Commissioner Arkibiyades
- Ferahfeza (2012) - Sex shop owner
- Bana Adını Sor (2014) - Hakan
- Çalsın Sazlar (2014)
- Yağmur: Kıyamet Çiçeği (2014) - Kazım Koyuncu
- Anka (2022)
- Tamirhane (2022) - Gürdal
- Prestij Meselesi (2023) - Hilmi Topaloğlu
- Aybüke: Ben Öğretmen Oldum (2023) - District governor
- Zaferin Rengi (2024) - Rauf Orbay

=== TV series ===
- İki Arkadaş (1998) - Rıza
- Yılan Hikayesi (2000) - Police
- Yedi Numara (2000)
- Beşik Kertmesi (2002)
- Canım Kocacığım (2002)
- Hürrem Sultan (2003) - Şehzade Cihangir
- Kampüsistan (2003) - Oğuz
- Emret Komutanım (2005) - Senor Seyfi
- Kızlar Yurdu (2006) - Çavuş Seyfi Sarsılmaz
- Çemberin Dışında (2007) - Kıvanç Özyurt
- Yasak Elma (2007) - Teoman
- Gece Gündüz (2008) - Police Tekin
- Aile Saadeti (2009) - Mahir
- Bu Kalp Seni Unutur Mu? (2009) - Engin Doğan
- Yaprak Dökümü (2009) - Waiter Emir
- Küstüm Çiçeği (2010) - Semih
- Gönülçelen (2010) - Burhan's youth
- Koyu Kırmızı (2012) - Ufuk
- İntikam (2013–2014) - Hakan Eren
- Kara Ekmek (2015) - Taylan
- Kimse Bilmez (2019) - Uygar Sarıkaya
- Doğduğun Ev Kaderindir (2019–2020) - Faruk
- Evlilik Hakkında Her Şey (2021) - Koray
- Midnight at the Pera Palace (2022) - Reşat
- Bir Derdim Var (2023) - Savaş Dönmez

=== Music videos ===
- Mor ve Ötesi - "Son Giden" (2001)
- Gökhan Türkmen - "Bir Öykü" (2014)
- Nilüfer - "Seni Kimler Aldı" (2017)

=== TV programs ===
- Altın Petek (2016)

== Awards ==
- 2004 - 8th Afife Theatre Awards, "New Generation Special Award in Theater"
- 2010 - 15th Sadri Alışık Acting Awards, "Best Actor in a Supporting Role in Theater Comedy"
- 2011 - 18th Adana Golden Boll Awards, "Jury Special Collective Performance Award (shared with the cast)"
- 2015 - 20th Sadri Alışık Cinema Awards, "Ayhan Işık Special Award" (Çalsın Sazlar/Yağmur: Kıyamet Çiçeği)
