= James Chalmers (actor) =

English actor

- Born: September 1974 (age 52); York, England
- Education: Bradfield College; University of Edinburgh; London Academy of Music and Dramatic Art
- Occupations: Actor, Director, Producer
- Years active: 2000–present
- Height: 5 ft 11 in (1.80 m)
- Children: 2

James Robert Alexander Chalmers (born September 1974) is an English actor who has performed in film, television and theatre. Chalmers graduated from the University of Edinburgh and continued his training at the London Academy of Music and Dramatic Art. He first performed with the Royal Shakespeare Company in Spanish Golden Age productions and made his West End debut when the season transferred to the Playhouse Theatre in 2005. He has performed with Shakespeare's Globe and the Read Not Dead project, Royal Court Theatre, Northcott Theatre, Royal National Theatre (studio), Theatre503, and the Park Theatre (London).

== Early life ==
Chalmers was educated at Eagle House School in Berkshire and Bradfield College. He went on to study at the University of Edinburgh from 1994 to 1998, where he was awarded a BSc in Civil Engineering. He then trained at the London Academy of Music and Dramatic Art (LAMDA), London, where fellow students included Daisy Haggard and Benedict Cumberbatch, graduating in 2000.

== Selected career ==
=== Film ===
In 2008 he was main cast in the British zombie movie Within The Woods directed by Luke Massey. In 2019 he was main cast in the independent feature film Kill Ben Lyk.

=== Television ===
In 2006 he guest starred in The Bill as Environmental Protection Officer Alistair Maddison. In 2008 he guest starred in the Casualty as the scam artist Steve Denver. In 2020 he played the role of William Ponsonby (British Army officer) in Belgravia (TV series). In 2022 he played the role of George in Midnight at the Pera Palace on Netflix.

=== Theatre ===
He is most known on stage, for his role in Tamar's Revenge (by Tirso de Molina 2004) performed by the Royal Shakespeare Company, where he played the lead role of Absalom. In that season he also appeared in Pedro, the Great Pretender (by Miguel de Cervantes), Dog in a Manger (by Lope De Vega), and House of Desires (by Sor Juana Ines de la Cruz).

In 2016 he appeared in The Patriotic Traitor with Tom Conti and Laurence Fox, written and directed by Jonathan Lynn.

== Filmography ==
=== Film ===
Year	Title	Role	Notes
2010	A Good Life	Policeman	Short film by Rowan Athale
2016	Daisy	Dad	Nominated Best Supporting Actor Idyllwild International Festival of Cinema
2017	Choke	John	Nominated Best Actor 48 Film Festival
2017	The Current War	South Dakota Delegate	
2018	Kill Ben Lyk	Scott	

=== Television ===
Year	Title	Role	Notes
2001	The Vice	Police Recruit	
2006	The Bill	Alistair Maddison	
2008	Casualty	Steve Denver	
2009	Doctors	Felix Bell	
2015	EastEnders	Clerk of the Court	
2018	Vanity Fair	Vicar	under production by ITV and Amazon Studios,
2020	Belgravia	Sir William Ponsonby	
2022	Midnight at the Pera Palace	George	Released on Netflix Worldwide 3 March 2022

== Theatre ==
=== Selected stage credits ===
Year	Title	Role	Notes
2004	Tamar's Revenge	Absalom (lead)	RSC - directed by Simon Usher
2004	Pedro The Great Pretender	Diego Tarugo	RSC - directed by Mike Alfreds
2004	Dog In A Manger	Antonelo	RSC - directed by Laurence Boswell
2006	The Daughter In Law	Joe	
2008	Warm	Man 2	By Jon Fosse, directed by Simon Usher
2010	If So, Then Yes	Robert/Kevin/Robin	By N.F. Simpson, directed by Simon Usher
2012	Richard III	Buckingham	
2014	Othello	Duke of Venice/Montano	
2016	The Patriotic Traitor	General Le Gallet/Captain De Courcel	Written and directed by Jonathan Lynn, with Tom Conti and Laurence Fox
