= Ufuk Beydemir =

Turkish singer (born 1992)

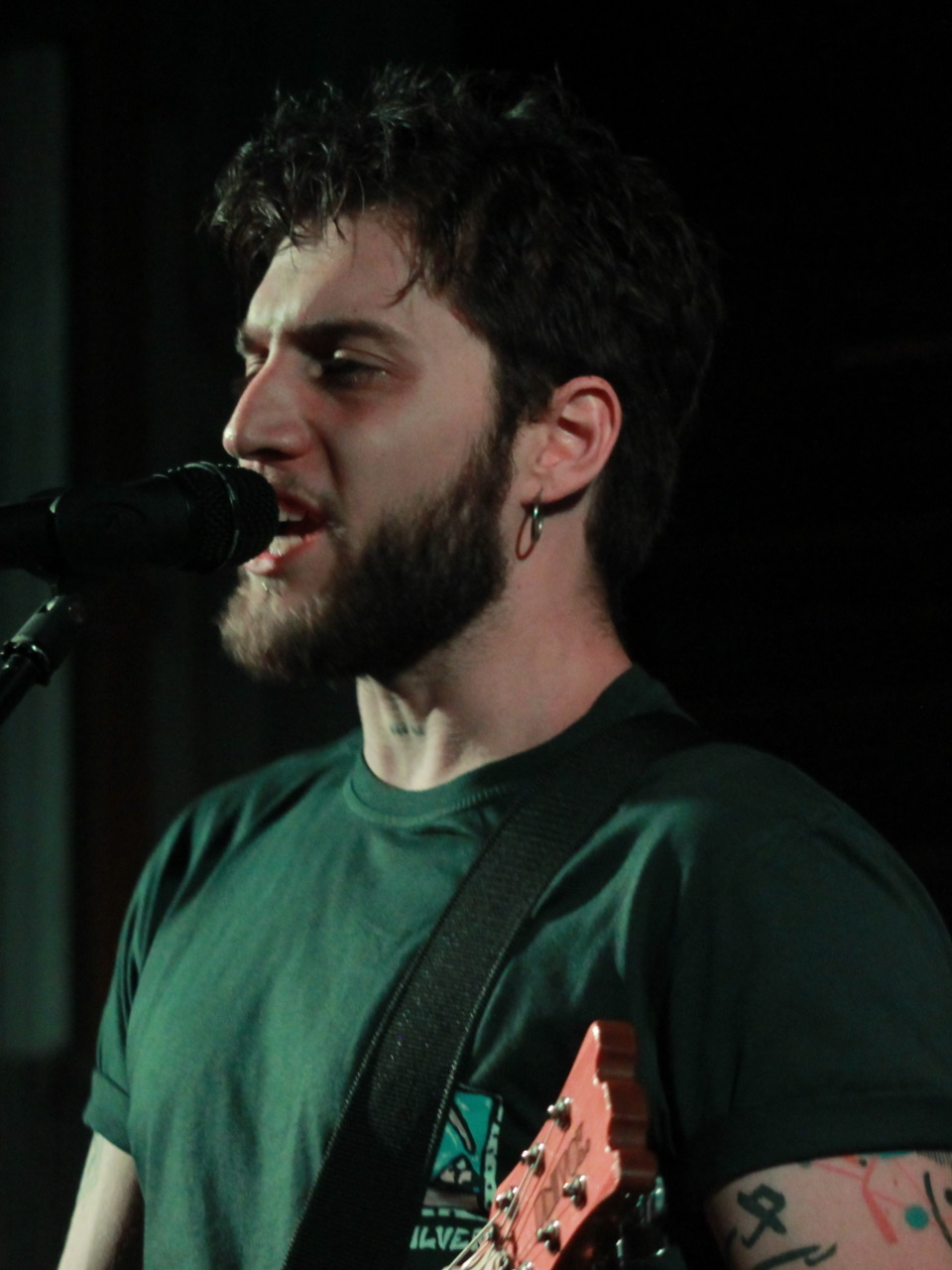
- Beydemir in August 2019
- Born: 14 April 1992 (age 34); Istanbul, Turkey
- Education: Istanbul Gelisim University
- Occupations: Singer, songwriter, musician
- Years active: 2018–present
- Spouse: İpek Filiz Yazıcı (m. 2022; div. 2025)

Ufuk Beydemir (born 14 April 1992) is a Turkish singer, songwriter and tennis coach. He became known in Turkey with the release of his song "Ay Tenli Kadın". In 2018, Beydemir ranked third on the list of nominees for "Musician of the Year Award" at the GQ Men of the Year awards by GQ Türkiye. Beydemir, who released his first album Sevda Gibi in 2018, was given the "Most Powerful Newcomer-Singer" award at the 2019 PowerTürk Music Awards.

== Discography ==
Albums

- Sevda Gibi (2018)
- Kristal Oda (2020)

EPs

- Akustik (2019)

Singles

- "HİÇ" (2021)
- "HİÇ (Can VS Remix)" (2021)
- "Biri Var" (2021)
- "Tamirci Çırağı" (2021)
- "Ellerin Uzansa" (2021)
- "Aklımda Bir Dünya" (2022)
- "Ben Bir Kek Miyim?" (2022)
- "Derdini Bana Anlat" (2022)
- "Galiba (Jeremy Version)" (2022)
- "Ta-Da (Jeremy Version)" (2022)

== Awards and nominations ==
- 2019 – PowerTürk Music Awards – "Most Powerful Newcomer-Singer"
