= Love 101 (TV series) =

Turkish television series

- Turkish: Aşk 101
- Genre: Period teen drama; Comedy drama
- Written by: Meriç Acemi; Destan Sedolli
- Directed by: Ahmet Katıksız; Deniz Yorulmazer; Gönenç Uyanık; Umut Aral
- Starring: Mert Yazıcıoğlu; Kubilay Aka; Alina Boz; Selahattin Paşalı; İpek Filiz Yazıcı; Pınar Deniz; Kaan Urgancıoğlu; Ece Yüksel
- Narrated by: Bade İşçil
- Composer: Marios Takoushis
- Country of origin: Turkey
- Original language: Turkish
- No. of seasons: 2
- No. of episodes: 16

Production
- Producer: Kerem Çatay
- Editor: Ahmet Can Çakırca
- Running time: 33–48 minutes
- Production company: Ay Yapım

Original release
- Network: Netflix
- Release: 24 April 2020 – 30 September 2021

Related
- Doraemon

Love 101 (Turkish: Aşk 101) is a Turkish teen comedy-drama, starring Mert Yazıcıoğlu, Kubilay Aka, Alina Boz, Selahattin Paşalı, İpek Filiz Yazıcı, Pınar Deniz, Kaan Urgancıoğlu and Ece Yüksel (2nd season). Its first season, which consists of 8 episodes, is directed by Ahmet Katıksız and Deniz Yorulmazer, written by Meriç Acemi and Destan Sedolli. The series started streaming on Netflix on 24 April 2020.

The second and final season premiered on 30 September 2021. It's directed by Umut Aral and Gönenç Uyanık and consists of 8 episodes.

== Plot ==
The story begins in today's Istanbul when a woman called Işık (Bade İşçil) arrives at an old house. There she recalls the past and friends of her youth.

Back in 1998, a group of young people (Eda, Osman, Sinan, and Kerem) studying in a school of Istanbul are at risk of expulsion because of their poor behavior. They are very different from their classmates, therefore, very lonely. The headmaster and most of the teachers are against them, only one teacher by the name of Burcu (Pınar Deniz) does her best to protect the teenagers. However, they find out that Burcu will be relocated, which means that all of them would be expelled after her relocation. In order to prevent this, the students unite and make a plan. The students discover that according to the law, she can choose the place of work by herself if she is married. They decide that they will try to make Burcu fall in love with the new sports teacher, Kemal (Kaan Urgancıoğlu), so that she can stay in Istanbul. Soon enough they discover that Burcu is already in a "happy" relationship and that it won't be easy to make her stay. They ask for help from Işık (İpek Filiz Yazıcı), an excellent student and a girl with a big heart. Soon she becomes a part of their group. This union helps the students change for the better, understand themselves, realize the importance of true friendship, find love and their own way in life. Eda (Alina Boz) aspires to be a graphic designer, even though her family wants her to make money and move up in society. Osman (Selahattin Paşalı) is a young entrepreneur, trying to hustle his way out of poverty by always finding gigs. Sinan (Mert Yazıcıoğlu) struggles to keep his life together, always sipping from his hip flask as he continues living with his senile grandfather since he was 14 after his family's divorce. Kerem (Kubilay Aka), a basketball player who gets kicked out of the school team also endeavors the struggles of being the son of a very famous person in Turkey.

== Cast ==
=== Main ===
- Mert Yazıcıoğlu as Sinan
- Kubilay Aka as Kerem
- Alina Boz as Eda
- Selahattin Paşalı as Osman
- İpek Filiz Yazıcı as Işık
- Pınar Deniz as Burcu
- Kaan Urgancıoğlu as Kemal
- Ece Yüksel as Elif (season 2)

=== Recurring ===
- Müfit Kayacan as Necdet
- Fatih Al as Yıldıray (season 2)
- Bade İşçil as adult Işık
- Tuba Ünsal as adult Eda
- Mert Fırat as adult Kerem (season 2)
- Fatih Artman as adult Osman (season 2)
- Uraz Kaygılaroğlu as adult Sinan (season 2)
- Ali Il as Tuncay
- Merve Akkaya as Billur

== Episodes ==
Season	Episodes	Originally released
1	8	April 24, 2020
2	8	September 30, 2021

=== Season 1 (2020) ===
No. overall	No. in season	Title	Directed by	Written by	Original release date
1	1	"The First Moment"	Ahmet Katıksız	Meriç Acemi	April 24, 2020
2	2	"Admiration"	Ahmet Katıksız	Meriç Acemi	April 24, 2020
3	3	"Lust"	Ahmet Katıksız	Meriç Acemi	April 24, 2020
4	4	"Longing"	Ahmet Katıksız	Meriç Acemi	April 24, 2020
5	5	"Affection"	Deniz Yorulmazer	Meriç Acemi	April 24, 2020
6	6	"Fun"	Deniz Yorulmazer	Meriç Acemi	April 24, 2020
7	7	"A Turn"	Deniz Yorulmazer	Meriç Acemi	April 24, 2020
8	8	"A Special Moment"	Deniz Yorulmazer	Meriç Acemi	April 24, 2020

=== Season 2 (2021) ===
No. overall	No. in season	Title	Directed by	Written by	Original release date
9	1	"Episode 1"	Gönenç Uyanık	Meriç Acemi	September 30, 2021
10	2	"Episode 2"	Gönenç Uyanık	Meriç Acemi	September 30, 2021
11	3	"Episode 3"	Gönenç Uyanık	Meriç Acemi	September 30, 2021
12	4	"Episode 4"	Gönenç Uyanık	Meriç Acemi	September 30, 2021
13	5	"Episode 5"	Umut Aral	Meriç Acemi	September 30, 2021
14	6	"Episode 6"	Umut Aral	Meriç Acemi	September 30, 2021
15	7	"Episode 7"	Umut Aral	Meriç Acemi	September 30, 2021
16	8	"Episode 8"	Umut Aral	Meriç Acemi	September 30, 2021

== Filming ==
The principal photography for the first and second seasons took place at Akif Tunçel Vocational and Technical Anatolian High School in Şişli, Istanbul.

== Reaction ==
Before the series' premiere, it was claimed that the character Osman was being used for "homosexual propaganda" and "deviance". Netflix denied these claims. The critics, who watched the first 8 episodes of the series and wrote about it in their columns, stated that there is no such character in the series.
