= Doğduğun Ev Kaderindir =

Turkish television series

- Doğduğun Ev Kaderindir
- Genre: Drama; Romance
- Based on: Camdaki Kız de Gülseren Budayıcıoğlu
- Written by: Eylem Canpolat (ep. 1-27); Ayşenur Sıkı (ep. 1-27); Defne Gürsoy (ep. 1-27); Doruk Erengül (ep. 2, 5-27); Seray Şahiner (ep. 1-33); Selcan Özgür (ep. 33-43); Berrin Tekdemir (ep. 37-43); Firuze Engin (ep. 38-43)
- Directed by: Çağrı Bayrak
- Starring: Demet Özdemir; İbrahim Çelikkol; Engin Öztürk; Zuhal Gencer; Senan Kara; Elif Sönmez; Hülya Duyar; Fatih Koyunoğlu; Naz Göktan; İncinur Sevimli; Helin Kandemir; Kaan Altay Köprülü; Hakan Salınmış; Nurşim Demir; Zeynep Kumral; Engin Hepileri; Kazım Sinan Demirer
- Composer: Fırat Yükselir
- Country of origin: Turkey
- Original language: Turkish
- No. of seasons: 2
- No. of episodes: 43

Production
- Producer: Onur Güvenatam
- Production location: Istanbul
- Running time: 130 minutes
- Production company: OGM Pictures

Original release
- Network: TV8
- Release: December 25, 2019 – May 12, 2021

Doğduğun Ev Kaderindir is a Turkish romantic drama series that broadcast on TV8 betweewn December 25, 2019 and May 12, 2021 and stars Demet Özdemir, İbrahim Çelikkol and Engin Öztürk. It was adapted from the book Camdaki Kız by the writer Gülseren Budayıcıoğlu.

== Plot ==
Zeynep Göksu is a girl born into a poor family with few opportunities in life. Her father is a violent alcoholic, her mother weak and her older brother dies from lack of medical care. But her luck suddenly changes when the family that employs her mother as her maid offers to adopt the girl. Her parents agree in hopes of giving their daughter a better life. Innocent Zeynep becomes an intelligent, educated and beautiful young woman engaged to be married to a high society dream man. However, her life takes an unexpected turn when her biological mother reappears, trying to take back control of her life as a child and bring her back to the home where she was born.

== Cast ==
=== Main characters ===
Actor/Actress	Character	Episodes
Demet Özdemir	Zeynep Göksu	1-43
İbrahim Çelikkol	Mehdi Karaca	1-37
Engin Öztürk	Barış Tunahan	15-43
Zuhal Gencer	Sakine	1-43
Senan Kara	Nermin	1-43
Elif Sönmez	Cemile Karaca	1-43
Hülya Duyar	Sultan	1-43
Fatih Koyunoğlu	Nuh	1-43
Naz Göktan	Emine	1-43
İncinur Sevimli	Benal	1-39, 43
Helin Kandemir	Kibrit / Dilara	1-34
Kaan Altay Köprülü	Savaş Tunahan	24-43
Hakan Salınmış	Ali Rıza Dayı	27-43
Nurşim Demir	Zeliha Karaca	1-12
Zeynep Kumral	Müjgan Karaca	1-23
Engin Hepileri	Faruk	1-18
Kazım Sinan Demirer	Bayram Göksu	1-27

=== Secondary characters ===
Actor/Actress	Character	Episodes
Nail Kırmızıgül	Ekrem	1-12
Kayra Zabcı	Yasemin	1-12
Beren Nur Karadis	Zeynep Göksu child	1, 3, 6–7, 10, 16-17
Alp Akar	Remzi	1-12
Mehmet Korhan Fırat	Celal	1-4, 7, 10
Ali Oğuz Şenol	Tolga	1-3
Sultan Köroglu Kiliç	Duriye	1-3
Cengiz Aydoğan	Man of Celal	1-2, 7
Emir Talha	Yaldiz Ali	1-22
Hilal Uysun	Meltem	5-10, 38, 40-42
Cihangir Kose	Lawyer Hüseyin	5-6, 8, 18–19, 25-28
Bahar Gökçeri	Assistant	7
Basak Aygün	Selin	12-15
Binnur Kaya	Doctor Manolya Yadigaroglu	13
Gülçin Kültür Şahin	Secretary Tuna	13
Gulru Sinem Akkaya	Beril	15-17, 19–24, 26–28, 30, 33, 38–39, 43
Aysegul Turkoglu	Ceren	13-17, 19–28, 31, 36–37, 43
Teoman Kumbaracıbaşı	Burhan	16-22
Macit Taştan	Murat	16-28
Kübra Balcan	Seyhan	16, 19, 24, 26–28, 30
Ayşe Akın	Nazli	18-22, 24
Selin Selvi	Cathy	24-25, 27
Coraline Chapatte	Aleksandra	28-38, 40-43
Rıza Akın	Cengiz	28, 30–33, 36-37
Ebru Cündübeyoğlu	Özlem Tunahan Poyraz	29-35
İnanç Konukçu	Meto / Metin	32-37
Erkan Petekkaya	Sadi	37
Gülcan Arslan	Nesrin / Gülbin Göksu	38-43
Fırat Doğruloğlu	Tarik	39-43
Latife Burcu Arslan	Asli	40-41, 43
Eftelya Bilen	Nesrin / Gülbin Göksu child	42

== Series overview ==
Season	Episodes	Originally released	
Season	Episodes	First released	Last released
1	12	December 25, 2019	July 1, 2020
2	31	September 30, 2020	May 12, 2021

== Production ==
The series is directed by Çağrı Bayrak, written by Eylem Canpolat, Ayşenur Sıkı, Defne Gürsoy, Doruk Erengül, Seray Şahiner, Selcan Özgür, Berrin Tekdemir and Firuze Engin and produced by OGM Pictures. Also, it was adapted from the book Camdaki Kız by writer Gülseren Budayıcıoğlu.

=== Filming ===
The series was filmed in Istanbul, specifically in the locations of Pier Loti, Beykoz district, Bosphorus beach, Balat district, Eyüpsultan district and on the coast of Üsküdar, next to the Maiden's Tower.

== Distribution ==
In Turkey the series aired on TV8 from December 25, 2019 to May 12, 2021: the first season aired from December 25, 2019, to July 1, 2020, while the second season aired from September 30, 2020 to May 12, 2021.

Episodes composition

In Turkey the series consists of two seasons of 43 episodes, each of which lasts approximately 130 minutes: the first season includes the first 12 episodes (episodes 1–12), while the second season includes the remaining 31 (episodes 13- 43).

== Awards ==
Year	Award	Category	Name yourself	Result
2020	International Izmir Film Festival	Best television series	Doğduğun Ev Kaderindir	Nominated
2020	International Izmir Film Festival	Best actress in a television series	Demet Özdemir	Nominated
2020	International Izmir Film Festival	Best actor in a television series	İbrahim Çelikkol	Nominated
2020	International Izmir Film Festival	Best supporting actor in a television series	Engin Hepileri	Nominated
2020	International Izmir Film Festival	Best supporting actress in a television series	Zuhal Gencer	Nominated
2020	International Izmir Film Festival	Best director in a television series	Çağrı Bayrak	Won
2020	International Izmir Film Festival	Best writing in a television series	Eylem Canpolat, Ayşenur Sıkı, Defne Gürsoy, Doruk Erengül and Seray Şahiner	Won
2020	PRODU Awards	Best actress in a foreign series	Demet Özdemir	Nominated
2020	Turkey Youth Awards	Best television actress	Demet Özdemir	Nominated
2021	Ayakli Gazete TV Stars Awards	Best actress in a television series	Demet Özdemir	Nominated
2022	Turkey Youth Awards	Best television actress	Demet Özdemir	Nominated
