= Ezgi Şenler =

Turkish actress (born 1993)

- Born: 28 January 1993 (age 33); Ankara, Turkey
- Education: Hacettepe University Ankara State Conservatory
- Occupation: Actress
- Years active: 2016–present

Ezgi Şenler (born 28 January 1993) is a Turkish Actor.

== Life and career ==
Ezgi Şenler was born on 28 January 1993 in Ankara. At the age of 9, she studied ballet at the Ankara State Opera and Ballet Department for two years. She is a graduate of Hacettepe University Ankara State Conservatory with a degree in Modern dance. She made her television debut in 2016 with a recurring role in the Kanal D series Bodrum Masalı. Şenler continued her career with the Star TV series Nefes Nefese before being cast in a leading role in the ATV series Canevim as Müjgan Haksever. In 2021, she was cast in a leading role in the action drama series Teşkilat.

== Filmography ==
=== Television ===
Television
Year	Title	Role	Notes
2016	Bodrum Masalı	Aslı	Leading role
2018	Nefes Nefese	Mercan	Leading role
2019	Canevim	Müjgan Hakseven	Leading role
2020	Çatı Katı Aşk	Ayşen Yılmaz	Leading role
2021–2022	Teşkilat	Pınar Gümüş	Leading role
2023	Üvey Anne	Nisan Gencer	Leading role
2026-	Evlilik Güzeldir	Çağla	Leading role

=== Film ===
Film
Year	Title	Role	Notes
2022	Sen Yaşamaya Bak	Fatoş	Supporting role
