= In Good Hands =

- Turkish: Sen Yaşamaya Bak
- Directed by: Ketche
- Written by: Hakan Bonomo
- Produced by: Timur Savcı; Cemal Okan
- Starring: Aslı Enver; Kaan Urgancıoğlu
- Production company: TAFF Pictures
- Distributed by: Netflix
- Release date: 21 March 2022
- Running time: 104 minutes
- Country: Turkey
- Language: Turkish

In Good Hands (Turkish: Sen Yaşamaya Bak) is a 2022 Turkish film directed by Ketche, written by Hakan Bonomo and starring Aslı Enver, Kaan Urgancıoğlu and Mert Ege Ak.

== Cast ==
- Aslı Enver as Melisa
- Kaan Urgancıoğlu as Firat
- Mert Ege Ak as Can
- Ezgi Şenler as Fatoş
- Vural Şahanoğlu
- Latif Koru
- Gizem Özmen
- Sertaç Güder
- Defne Ayşe Özpirinç as Ayşe
