= Family Secrets (2021 TV series) =

Turkish television series

- Promotional poster
- Also known as: The Judiciary (literal translation)
- Turkish: Yargı
- Genre: Psychological thriller; Police procedural; Crime
- Written by: Sema Ergenekon
- Directed by: Ali Bilgin (episodes 1–95); Beste Sultan Kasapoğulları (episodes 20–95)
- Starring: Kaan Urgancıoğlu; Pınar Deniz
- Music by: Toygar Işıklı
- Country of origin: Turkey
- Original language: Turkish
- No. of seasons: 3
- No. of episodes: 95

Production
- Executive producer: Kerem Çatay
- Production location: Istanbul
- Cinematography: Yalçın Avcı
- Running time: 140 minutes
- Production company: Ay Yapım

Original release
- Network: Kanal D
- Release: September 19, 2021 – May 26, 2024

Family Secrets (Turkish: Yargı; lit. 'The Judiciary') is a Turkish psychological thriller television series developed by Ay Yapım, written by Sema Ergenekon and directed by Ali Bilgin that aired between September 19, 2021 and May 26, 2024. It stars Kaan Urgancıoğlu and Pınar Deniz. In 2023, it was named the Best Telenovela at the 51st International Emmy Awards in New York City.

== Premise ==
The series starts when Ilgaz (Kaan Urgancıoğlu), a respected public prosecutor, and Ceylin (Pınar Deniz), a young attorney, cross paths due to a murder case and are forced to work together in order to uncover the real culprit behind the event that caused irreversible changes in both of their lives.

== Cast ==
Character	Portrayed by	Season		
Character	Portrayed by	1	2	3
Main
Ilgaz Kaya	Kaan Urgancıoğlu	Main	Main	Main
Ceylin Erguvan	Pınar Deniz	Main	Main	Main
Yekta Tilmen	Uğur Polat	Main	Main	Main
Eren Duman	Uğur Aslan	Main	Main	Main
Metin Kaya	Hüseyin Avni Danyal	Main	Main	Recurring
Pars Seçkin	Mehmet Yılmaz Ak	Main	Main	
Recurring
Çınar Kaya	Arda Anarat	Recurring	Recurring	Recurring
Inci Erguvan	Ece Yüksel	Recurring		Guest
Engin Tilmen	Onur Durmaz	Recurring		Guest
Neva Seçkin	Başak Gümülcinelioğlu	Recurring	Guest	
Derya Ihdal	Șukran Ovalı	Recurring	Recurring	Guest
Merdan Kaya	Cezmi Baskın	Recurring	Recurring	Recurring
Zafer Erguvan	Ali Seçkiner Alıcı	Recurring		Guest
Gül Erguvan	Zeyno Eracar	Recurring	Recurring	Recurring
Aylin Erguvan	Pınar Çağlar Gençtürk	Recurring	Recurring	Recurring
Osman Yılmaz	Onur Özaydın	Recurring	Recurring	Recurring
Parla Yılmaz	Zeynep Atılgan	Recurring	Recurring	Recurring
Defne Kaya	Beren Nur Karadiș	Recurring	Recurring	Recurring
Makbule Kaya	Özlem Çakar	Recurring		
Laçin Gökmen	Nilgün Türksever	Recurring	Recurring	Recurring
Tuğçe Duman	Merve Ateș	Recurring	Recurring	Recurring
Serdar Denzi	Eray Ertüren	Recurring	Recurring	
Merve Demetoğlu	Zeynep Parla	Recurring	Recurring	Guest
Rıdvan	Yiğit Kalkavan	Recurring	Recurring	Guest
Zümrut	Esma Yesim Gül	Recurring		Recurring
Cüneyt Ozgan	Hakan Dinçkol	Recurring		
Seda Gökmen	Nergis Öztürk	Recurring		
Özge Ișıklı	Dilara Çakır	Recurring	Recurring	Recurring
Burak Yıldırım	Samet Kaan Kuyucu		Recurring	
Ayten Suat Ezin	Elif Melda Yılmaz		Recurring	
Tolga Çırmak	Emir Özden		Recurring	
Haluk Yıldırım	Kenan Bal		Recurring	
Rafet Günbay	Muttalip Müjdeci		Recurring	Guest
Çetin Sarioglu	Merih Ermakastar		Recurring	
Turgut Ali Duymaz	Yurdaer Okur		Recurring	
Ömer Tilmen / Yakup Atamer	Doğac Yıldız		Recurring	
Eyüp Böceli / Gökhan Denzi	Alper Çankaya		Recurring	
Efe Ekneraz	Ulvi Kahyaoğlu			Recurring
Nil Barkın	Müge Bayramoğlu			Recurring
Mercan Kaya	Eylül Uğur			Recurring
Elif Yılmaz	Gece Ișık Demirel			Recurring
Nadide Baksı	Ayșen Sezerel			Recurring
Yiğit	Alican Altun			Recurring
Ela Özbay	Çağla Demir			Recurring
Kadir Adarlı	Arif Pișkin			Recurring
Iclal Zerden	Defne Kayalar			Recurring
Minor
Umut	Onur Tekin	Recurring	Recurring	Recurring
Göksu Alptug	Duygu Serin	Recurring	Recurring	Recurring
Anil Tayan	Tolga Canbeyli	Recurring	Recurring	Recurring
Ozan Güney	Özay Özgüler	Guest		
Șahver Yengi	Ayșenil Șamlıoğlu	Recurring		
Özlem Kartal	Pınar Töre	Recurring		
Fatih Kartal	Selahattin Töz	Recurring		
Niyazi Karaçam	Ilker Kalay	Recurring		
Özcan Sandık	Serdar Orçin		Recurring	
Esin Atamer	Sevinç Erol		Guest	
Yüksel	Șerif Erol		Guest	
Gonca	Burcu Altın Deprem			Guest
Dilek Oknaz	Seda Türkmen			Recurring
Filiz Bağcı	Özlem Türay			Recurring
Macit Tura	Macit Koper			Guest
Can Aynar	Ferit Kaya			Recurring

== Overview ==
Season	Episodes	Originally released		Time slot
Season	Episodes	First released	Last released	Time slot
1	34	September 19, 2021	May 29, 2022	Sunday at 20:00 (Kanal D)
2	29	September 18, 2022	May 7, 2023	Sunday at 20:00 (Kanal D)
3	32	September 24, 2023	May 26, 2024	Sunday at 20:00 (Kanal D)

== Episodes ==
=== Season 1 (2021–2022) ===
Ep.	#	Quote	Directed by	Screenwriter	Original release date
1	1	"An executioner glances through the eyes of every judge." (Friedrich Nietzsche)	Ali Bilgin	Sema Ergenekon	September 19, 2021
2	2	"Like water in water, everything I knew became invisible." (William Shakespeare)	Ali Bilgin	Sema Ergenekon	September 26, 2021
3	3	"Every sinner has a future." (Oscar Wilde)	Ali Bilgin	Sema Ergenekon	October 3, 2021
4	4	"No crime is forgotten as long as the conscience still remembers it." (Stefan Zweig)	Ali Bilgin	Sema Ergenekon	October 10, 2021
5	5	"The essential is invisible to the eye." (Antoine de Saint-Exupéry)	Ali Bilgin	Sema Ergenekon	October 17, 2021
6	6	"Do not think that everyone who pats you on the back is a friend, maybe they are looking for a place to stab you." (Ali)	Ali Bilgin	Sema Ergenekon	October 24, 2021
7	7	"When the water rises, the fish eats the ants; when the water recedes, the ants eat the fish. The 'flow of the water' decides who will eat whom." (Plato)	Ali Bilgin	Sema Ergenekon	October 31, 2021
8	8	"Three things can't be kept hidden for long: the sun, the moon and the truth." (Gautama Buddha)	Ali Bilgin	Sema Ergenekon	November 7, 2021
9	9	"When it snows on the mountain you trust, the best solution is to leave the mountain and the snow alone. When the day comes and the snow melts, the best answer is to greet the mountain that watches your path from another mountain." (Șems-i Tebrîzî)	Ali Bilgin	Sema Ergenekon	November 14, 2021
10	10	"It is not fire that burns a person, but their own negligence. They see the faults in everyone, but look at themselves through tinted glasses." (Mevlânâ Celâleddîn-i Rûmî)	Ali Bilgin	Sema Ergenekon	November 21, 2021
11	11	"When a person can't face their own wrongdoings, they keep playing with other people's mistakes." (Oscar Wilde)	Ali Bilgin	Sema Ergenekon	November 28, 2021
12	12	"There are two perfect people in the world: the one who is dead and the one who has not been born yet." (Chinese proverb)	Ali Bilgin	Sema Ergenekon	December 5, 2021
13	13	"Before you embark on a journey of revenge, dig two graves." (Confucius)	Ali Bilgin	Sema Ergenekon	December 12, 2021
14	14	"Killing a person is easy, but the blood splatters into the soul. The soul of a murderer bleeds." (Lev Tolstoy)	Ali Bilgin	Sema Ergenekon	December 19, 2021
15	15	"If you fall, I'll pick you up, if not, I will lay down with you." (Julio Cortázar)	Ali Bilgin	Sema Ergenekon	January 9, 2022
16	16	"Mild sorrows speak, but deeper ones are silent." (Seneca)	Ali Bilgin	Sema Ergenekon	January 16, 2022
17	17	"To find the right path, you just need to get lost." (Italo Calvino)	Ali Bilgin	Sema Ergenekon	January 23, 2022
18	18	"When I had all the answers, the questions changed." (Paulo Coelho)	Ali Bilgin	Sema Ergenekon	January 30, 2022
19	19	"The hardest thing to learn in life is which bridge to cross and which one to burn." (David Russell)	Ali Bilgin	Sema Ergenekon	February 6, 2022
20	20	"A bird sitting on a tree is never afraid of the branch breaking, because its trust doesn't lay in the branch but in its own wings." (Henrik Ibsen)	Ali Bilgin; Beste Sultan Kasapoğulları	Sema Ergenekon	February 13, 2022
21	21	"Sheep spend their lives in fear of the wolf. However, it is the shepherd who eats them in the end." (Thomas Hobbes)	Ali Bilgin; Beste Sultan Kasapoğulları	Sema Ergenekon	February 20, 2022
22	22	"Sometimes, life feels like a hail hit just when everything was about to bloom after being patient for a winter!" (José Mauro de Vasconcelos)	Ali Bilgin; Beste Sultan Kasapoğulları	Sema Ergenekon	February 27, 2022
23	23	"I bear the wounds of all the battles I avoided." (Fernando Pessoa)	Ali Bilgin; Beste Sultan Kasapoğulları	Sema Ergenekon	March 6, 2022
24	24	"How many lies have been told on earth; with words, with writing, with paintings or wordlessly." (Yusuf Atılgan)	Ali Bilgin; Beste Sultan Kasapoğulları	Sema Ergenekon	March 13, 2022
25	25	"Even within the most beautiful landscape, in trees, under the leaves, the insects are eating each other." (Francis Bacon)	Ali Bilgin; Beste Sultan Kasapoğulları	Sema Ergenekon	March 20, 2022
26	26	"Opened my breath, my mind, my deep heart. I loved my father the most in my life!" (Can Yücel)	Ali Bilgin; Beste Sultan Kasapoğulları	Sema Ergenekon	March 27, 2022
27	27	"There's daggers in people's smiles. The near in blood, the nearer bloody." (William Shakespeare)	Ali Bilgin; Beste Sultan Kasapoğulları	Sema Ergenekon	April 3, 2022
28	28	"In this world, don't depend too much on anyone, because even your own shadow leaves you when you are in darkness." (La Edri) (Note: The word laedri is used for "anonymous person" in Arabic and was written as La Edri in the series.)	Ali Bilgin; Beste Sultan Kasapoğulları	Sema Ergenekon	April 10, 2022
29	29	"How can I keep my soul to myself, so that it doesn't touch your soul? How can I raise it high enough, past you, to other things?" (Rilke)	Ali Bilgin; Beste Sultan Kasapoğulları	Sema Ergenekon	April 17, 2022
30	30	"Putting something together after you broke it doesn't make it whole again." (Ibn Rushd)	Ali Bilgin; Beste Sultan Kasapoğulları	Sema Ergenekon	April 24, 2022
31	31	"Three things tire a person the most; to forgive, to keep silent while burning inside, and to dream even when one knows it won't happen." (Chuck Palahniuk)	Ali Bilgin; Beste Sultan Kasapoğulları	Sema Ergenekon	May 8, 2022
32	32	"My heart is a broken clock, it always stops at you..." (Turgut Uyar)	Ali Bilgin; Beste Sultan Kasapoğulları	Sema Ergenekon	May 15, 2022
33	33	"Some doors seem closed to us because we stand behind them and not in front of them." (Ahmet Hamdi Tanpınar)	Ali Bilgin; Beste Sultan Kasapoğulları	Sema Ergenekon	May 22, 2022
34	34	"When a chord breaks, the harmony ceases forever." (Yahya Kemal Beyatlı)	Ali Bilgin; Beste Sultan Kasapoğulları	Sema Ergenekon	May 29, 2022

=== Season 2 (2022–2023) ===
Ep.	#	Quote	Directed by	Screenwriter	Original release date
35	1	"Yes, a person can lie by being silent." (Stefan Zweig)	Ali Bilgin; Beste Sultan Kasapoğulları	Sema Ergenekon	September 18, 2022
36	2	"And I can fight for everything and for everyone that I find true, just and beautiful..." (Nâzım Hikmet)	Ali Bilgin; Beste Sultan Kasapoğulları	Sema Ergenekon	September 25, 2022
37	3	"The cowards put traps, the brave fight with their hearts." (Ceylin Erguvan Kaya)	Ali Bilgin; Beste Sultan Kasapoğulları	Sema Ergenekon	October 2, 2022
38	4	"If I built the wall, you gave me the bricks." (Kemalettin Tuğcu)	Ali Bilgin; Beste Sultan Kasapoğulları	Sema Ergenekon	October 9, 2022
39	5	"Was this a one-man city? It is empty since you left." (Özdemir Asaf)	Ali Bilgin; Beste Sultan Kasapoğulları	Sema Ergenekon	October 16, 2022
40	6	"You may think wrong, you may understand wrong or you may do wrong; but you can't feel wrong." (Edith Wharton)	Ali Bilgin; Beste Sultan Kasapoğulları	Sema Ergenekon	October 23, 2022
41	7	"Every person eventually makes up a story that they think is their own life..." (Max Frisch)	Ali Bilgin; Beste Sultan Kasapoğulları	Sema Ergenekon	October 30, 2022
42	8	"Whenever we run from something, we run straight into something else." (Michael Balint)	Ali Bilgin; Beste Sultan Kasapoğulları	Sema Ergenekon	November 6, 2022
43	9	"Life is a very cruel teacher. It gives the exam first, then gives the lesson." (André Gide)	Ali Bilgin; Beste Sultan Kasapoğulları	Sema Ergenekon	November 13, 2022
44	10	"The heaviest burden is a secret, love be for those who can carry it." (La Fontaine)	Ali Bilgin; Beste Sultan Kasapoğulları	Sema Ergenekon	November 20, 2022
45	11	"Snowflakes in the avalanche do not know that they are the cause of it." (Oscar Wilde)	Ali Bilgin; Beste Sultan Kasapoğulları	Sema Ergenekon	November 27, 2022
46	12	"I don't wish to know anyone well enough to understand when they are lying." (Tezer Özlü)	Ali Bilgin; Beste Sultan Kasapoğulları	Sema Ergenekon	December 4, 2022
47	13	"...unspoken pain shatters the heart..." (William Shakespeare)	Ali Bilgin; Beste Sultan Kasapoğulları	Sema Ergenekon	December 11, 2022
48	14	"You think you escaped and then you collide with yourself." (James Joyce)	Ali Bilgin; Beste Sultan Kasapoğulları	Sema Ergenekon	December 18, 2022
49	15	"You're a knife that I turned straight towards myself!" (Franz Kafka)	Ali Bilgin; Beste Sultan Kasapoğulları	Sema Ergenekon	December 25, 2022
50	16	"To stand upright; you don't know how many defeats, how many tears, how many heartaches it takes!" (Frida Kahlo)	Ali Bilgin; Beste Sultan Kasapoğulları	Sema Ergenekon	January 15, 2023
51	17	"I don't know how to love less, and it's because I love so much that I don't get hurt as much." (Didem Madak)	Ali Bilgin; Beste Sultan Kasapoğulları	Sema Ergenekon	January 22, 2023
52	18	"All that I left behind is ashes. So I am the fire!" (Friedrich Nietzsche)	Ali Bilgin; Beste Sultan Kasapoğulları	Sema Ergenekon	January 29, 2023
53	19	"With every inner struggle, the heart loses a drop of blood." (William Shakespeare)	Ali Bilgin; Beste Sultan Kasapoğulları	Sema Ergenekon	February 5, 2023
54	20	"When you become the ice you never feel cold again." (Karl Georg Büchner)	Ali Bilgin; Beste Sultan Kasapoğulları	Sema Ergenekon	February 26, 2023
55	21	"One can go from the best to the worst in one step." (Ahmet Hamdi Tanpınar)	Ali Bilgin; Beste Sultan Kasapoğulları	Sema Ergenekon	March 5, 2023
56	22	"...I keep thinking, how much we died to live." (Onat Kutlar)	Ali Bilgin; Beste Sultan Kasapoğulları	Sema Ergenekon	March 12, 2023
57	23	"Everything goes away, a thick sadness remains..." (Turgut Uyar)	Ali Bilgin; Beste Sultan Kasapoğulları	Sema Ergenekon	March 19, 2023
58	24	"A port is not chosen in a storm!" (Irvine Welsh)	Ali Bilgin; Beste Sultan Kasapoğulları	Sema Ergenekon	March 26, 2023
59	25	"A person does not drown because they fall into the water, they drown because they can't get out of the water." (Mevlânâ)	Ali Bilgin; Beste Sultan Kasapoğulları	Sema Ergenekon	April 2, 2023
60	26	"What makes love real is struggle, you can't leave your loved ones in the hands of fate." (Lev Tolstoy)	Ali Bilgin; Beste Sultan Kasapoğulları	Sema Ergenekon	April 9, 2023
61	27	"Wherever people go, they go towards their death!" (Kemal Tahir)	Ali Bilgin; Beste Sultan Kasapoğulları	Sema Ergenekon	April 16, 2023
62	28	"Then cities will come between us, we will never meet. Even coincidences won't be able to bring us together. Then maybe one of us will die, the other will never know." (Nâzım Hikmet)	Ali Bilgin; Beste Sultan Kasapoğulları	Sema Ergenekon	April 30, 2023
63	29	"If you don't go through pain, you can't get out..." (Prosecutor of the Republic Ilgaz Kaya)	Ali Bilgin; Beste Sultan Kasapoğulları	Sema Ergenekon	May 7, 2023

=== Season 3 (2023–2024) ===
Ep	#	Quote	Directed by	Screenwriter	Original release date
64	1	"Because pain is not the story of what is gone, but the story of what remains, and the stories belong to those who remain." (Stefan Zweig)	Ali Bilgin; Beste Sultan Kasapoğulları	Sema Ergenekon	September 24, 2023
65	2	"In the same city, you are there, so am I, but we're not." (Cemal Süreya)	Ali Bilgin; Beste Sultan Kasapoğulları	Sema Ergenekon	October 1, 2023
66	3	"By drowning in the deepest seas, you learn to live with a single breath." (Friedrich Nietzsche)	Ali Bilgin; Beste Sultan Kasapoğulları	Sema Ergenekon	October 8, 2023
67	4	"The thorns that sting your feet are the harbingers of the rose you are looking for." (Mevlânâ)	Ali Bilgin; Beste Sultan Kasapoğulları	Sema Ergenekon	October 15, 2023
68	5	"When you look for light, you first fall into even deeper darkness." (Carl Gustav Jung)	Ali Bilgin; Beste Sultan Kasapoğulları	Sema Ergenekon	October 22, 2023
69	6	"There are no hopeless situations. There are hopeless people. I never lost hope." (Mustafa Kemal Atatürk)	Ali Bilgin; Beste Sultan Kasapoğulları	Sema Ergenekon	October 29, 2023
70	7	"A person looks at the thing they value with their eyes and carries it with their heart." (Neşet Ertaş)	Ali Bilgin; Beste Sultan Kasapoğulları	Sema Ergenekon	November 5, 2023
71	8	"We're like islands in the sea, separate on the surface but connected deep down..." (William James)	Ali Bilgin; Beste Sultan Kasapoğulları	Sema Ergenekon	November 12, 2023
72	9	"Something happens in the past and its shadow fall on the present." (Beliz Gücbilmez)	Ali Bilgin; Beste Sultan Kasapoğulları	Sema Ergenekon	November 19, 2023
73	10	"In this little world, everyone is hurt, nameless, everyone is at the wrong place..." (Fernando Pessoa)	Ali Bilgin; Beste Sultan Kasapoğulları	Sema Ergenekon	November 26, 2023
74	11	"In the hopeless conditions one finds oneself in, sometimes one thinks that one can break a chain with a strand of hair." (Victor Hugo)	Ali Bilgin; Beste Sultan Kasapoğulları	Sema Ergenekon	December 3, 2023
75	12	"Sometimes fate puts us in such situations that we end up doing the wrong thing by doing the right thing." (Irvin D. Yalom)	Ali Bilgin; Beste Sultan Kasapoğulları	Sema Ergenekon	December 10, 2023
76	13	"Maybe this world is another planet's hell." (Aldous Huxley)	Ali Bilgin; Beste Sultan Kasapoğulları	Sema Ergenekon	December 17, 2023
77	14	"Try to repair it as much as you want, the crack is still a crack..." (Mahatma Gandhi)	Ali Bilgin; Beste Sultan Kasapoğulları	Sema Ergenekon	December 24, 2023
78	15	"My soul is cold; I don't know how to cover myself properly." (Fernando Pessoa)	Ali Bilgin; Beste Sultan Kasapoğulları	Sema Ergenekon	January 14, 2024
79	16	"What determines fate is choice, not luck!" (Aristotle)	Ali Bilgin; Beste Sultan Kasapoğulları	Sema Ergenekon	January 21, 2024
80	17	"If you build walls between us now, I'll still paint them the color you like." (Didem Madak)	Ali Bilgin; Beste Sultan Kasapoğulları	Sema Ergenekon	January 28, 2024
81	18	"I know well those who don't belong anywhere. They act like they belong everywhere." (Hakan Günday)	Ali Bilgin; Beste Sultan Kasapoğulları	Sema Ergenekon	February 4, 2024
82	19	"...personality; In its immutability, it enters a different mold according to each relationship, and emerges slightly changed from each relationship..." (Bilge Karasu)	Ali Bilgin; Beste Sultan Kasapoğulları	Sema Ergenekon	February 11, 2024
83	20	"Even those who sleep on the same pillow don't know each other's dreams..." (Ahmet Hamdi Tanpınar)	Ali Bilgin; Beste Sultan Kasapoğulları	Sema Ergenekon	February 18, 2024
84	21	"After all, doesn't everyone carry within themselves that accursed stone that they will trip over?" (Heinrich von Kleist)	Ali Bilgin; Beste Sultan Kasapoğulları	Sema Ergenekon	February 25, 2024
85	22	"...everyone carries their own cross on their back." (Samuel Beckett)	Ali Bilgin; Beste Sultan Kasapoğulları	Sema Ergenekon	March 3, 2024
86	23	"What we secretly fear always happens to us." (Cesare Pavese)	Ali Bilgin; Beste Sultan Kasapoğulları	Sema Ergenekon	March 10, 2024
87	24	"Evil knows goodness, but goodness does not know evil." (Franz Kafka)	Ali Bilgin; Beste Sultan Kasapoğulları	Sema Ergenekon	March 17, 2024
88	25	"If the heart could think, it would give up on beating." (Fernando Pessoa)	Ali Bilgin; Beste Sultan Kasapoğulları	Sema Ergenekon	March 24, 2024
89	26	"It's not the presence of the window, but the absence of the wall that illuminates the room." (Lao Szu)	Ali Bilgin; Beste Sultan Kasapoğulları	Sema Ergenekon	April 14, 2024
90	27	"No one is as blind as someone who does not want to see." (Ibn-i Sina)	Ali Bilgin; Beste Sultan Kasapoğulları	Sema Ergenekon	April 21, 2024
91	28	"Iron, they forged it with iron; one was hot, the other was cold. Human, they shattered it with another human; one was hungry and the other was full." (Pir Sultan Abdal)	Ali Bilgin; Beste Sultan Kasapoğulları	Sema Ergenekon	April 28, 2024
92	29	"Like a snail, a crime leaves behind a silver smear." (Malavi Atasözü)	Ali Bilgin; Beste Sultan Kasapoğulları	Sema Ergenekon	May 5, 2024
93	30	"Dear death... I haven't lived yet." (Max Frisch)	Ali Bilgin; Beste Sultan Kasapoğulları	Sema Ergenekon	May 12, 2024
94	31	"For every event in the world, countless possibilities sleep in the world of examples..." (Mevlânâ)	Ali Bilgin; Beste Sultan Kasapoğulları	Sema Ergenekon	May 19, 2024
95	32	"Everything begins so it can end..." (Cicero)	Ali Bilgin; Beste Sultan Kasapoğulları	Sema Ergenekon	May 26, 2024

== Viewership ==
Yargı : Turkey viewers per episode (millions)

Season	Episode number																																		Average
Season	1	2	3	4	5	6	7	8	9	10	11	12	13	14	15	16	17	18	19	20	21	22	23	24	25	26	27	28	29	30	31	32	33	34	Average
1	2.90	5.71	7.22	7.07	7.66	9.14	9.72	9.58	9.66	9.19	9.96	9.33	10.60	9.85	10.81	10.39	11.27	10.96	9.23	10.27	10.05	8.96	10.61	10.33	9.22	9.30	9.12	8.89	9.43	9.33	8.71	9.46	7.65	7.94	9.10
2	6.18	7.27	6.64	7.19	7.67	8.28	7.88	8.69	8.48	8.21	8.17	9.28	8.19	8.19	8.14	7.49	7.64	7.62	9.01	8.02	7.25	6.30	5.85	7.40	7.28	7.13	7.54	6.78	7.07	–					7.61
3	6.03	6.34	6.17	6.27	6.85	6.78	7.33	7.29	7.74	7.50	7.01	7.44	5.97	6.44	6.40	6.13	4.96	6.10	5.95	5.71	5.59	5.93	5.19	6.68	6.36	5.82	5.67	5.11	4.52	4.28	5.42	4.49	–		6.10

Source: AB category

=== Season 1 (2021–2022) ===
Ep.	Original release date	Viewers (millions) (TOTAL)	Ranking (TOTAL)	Viewers (millions) (AB)	Ranking (AB)	Viewers (millions) (ABC1)	Ranking (ABC1)
1	September 19, 2021	3.49	2nd	2.90	2nd	3.90	2nd
2	September 26, 2021	5.03	2nd	5.71	2nd	5.91	2nd
3	October 3, 2021	7.02	2nd	7.22	2nd	7.47	2nd
4	October 10, 2021	7.51	2nd	7.07	2nd	7.96	2nd
5	October 17, 2021	6.84	2nd	7.66	2nd	8.34	2nd
6	October 24, 2021	7.71	2nd	9.14	1st	9.50	1st
7	October 31, 2021	7.45	2nd	9.72	2nd	9.64	2nd
8	November 7, 2021	7.33	2nd	9.58	1st	9.12	2nd
9	November 14, 2021	8.40	2nd	9.66	1st	10.38	1st
10	November 21, 2021	7.63	2nd	9.19	2nd	9.66	1st
11	November 28, 2021	8.34	2nd	9.96	1st	10.43	1st
12	December 5, 2021	7.55	2nd	9.33	2nd	9.71	2nd
13	December 12, 2021	8.29	2nd	10.60	1st	10.39	1st
14	December 19, 2021	9.39	2nd	9.85	2nd	10.91	1st
15	January 9, 2022	8.35	1st	10.81	1st	10.24	1st
16	January 16, 2022	7.98	3rd	10.39	1st	10.34	1st
17	January 23, 2022	8.53	2nd	11.27	1st	10.58	1st
18	January 30, 2022	8.40	2nd	10.96	1st	9.72	1st
19	February 6, 2022	7.87	3rd	9.23	1st	9.42	1st
20	February 13, 2022	8.17	2nd	10.27	1st	10.36	1st
21	February 20, 2022	7.69	2nd	10.05	1st	9.69	1st
22	February 27, 2022	6.89	2nd	8.96	1st	9.14	1st
23	March 6, 2022	8.14	1st	10.61	1st	10.27	1st
24	March 13, 2022	7.94	1st	10.33	1st	10.56	1st
25	March 20, 2022	7.30	3rd	9.22	1st	9.21	1st
26	March 27, 2022	6.48	3rd	9.30	1st	8.78	1st
27	April 3, 2022	6.59	2nd	9.12	1st	8.21	1st
28	April 10, 2022	5.86	2nd	8.89	1st	7.60	1st
29	April 17, 2022	6.64	1st	9.43	1st	8.99	1st
30	April 24, 2022	6.33	1st	9.33	1st	8.60	1st
31	May 8, 2022	6.47	1st	8.71	1st	8.51	1st
32	May 15, 2022	6.35	1st	9.46	1st	8.49	1st
33	May 22, 2022	6.16	2nd	7.65	1st	8.07	1st
34	May 29, 2022	5.71	1st	7.94	1st	7.31	1st

=== Season 2 (2022–2023) ===
Ep.	Original release date	Viewers (millions) (TOTAL)	Ranking (TOTAL)	Viewers (millions) (AB)	Ranking (AB)	Viewers (millions) (ABC1)	Ranking (ABC1)
35	September 18, 2022	4.43	1st	6.18	1st	6.18	1st
36	September 25, 2022	5.14	2nd	7.27	1st	6.54	2nd
37	October 2, 2022	4.93	2nd	6.64	2nd	6.38	2nd
38	October 9, 2022	5.52	2nd	7.19	2nd	6.83	2nd
39	October 16, 2022	6.04	2nd	7.67	2nd	7.41	2nd
40	October 23, 2022	6.37	1st	8.28	1st	8.88	1st
41	October 30, 2022	6.76	2nd	7.88	1st	9.36	1st
42	November 6, 2022	6.84	1st	8.69	1st	9.24	1st
43	November 13, 2022	6.80	2nd	8.48	1st	8.25	1st
44	November 20, 2022	6.84	2nd	8.21	2nd	8.43	2nd
45	November 27, 2022	6.75	2nd	8.11	2nd	8.22	2nd
46	December 4, 2022	6.74	1st	9.28	1st	8.77	1st
47	December 11, 2022	6.29	4th	8.19	2nd	7.90	2nd
48	December 18, 2022	6.20	4th	8.19	4th	7.93	4th
49	December 25, 2022	6.48	2nd	8.14	1st	8.09	1st
50	January 15, 2023	6.19	3rd	7.49	2nd	7.62	2nd
51	January 22, 2023	6.40	2nd	7.64	1st	8.16	1st
52	January 29, 2023	6.83	1st	7.62	1st	7.93	1st
53	February 5, 2023	7.06	1st	9.01	1st	8.63	1st
54	February 26, 2023	6.03	2nd	8.02	1st	7.60	1st
55	March 5, 2023	6.32	2nd	7.25	1st	7.63	1st
56	March 12, 2023	5.62	2nd	6.30	1st	7.20	1st
57	March 19, 2023	5.56	2nd	5.89	2nd	6.47	2nd
58	March 26, 2023	5.79	1st	7.40	1st	7.09	1st
59	April 2, 2023	5.50	1st	7.28	1st	7.11	1st
60	April 9, 2023	5.65	1st	7.13	1st	7.11	1st
61	April 16, 2023	5.33	1st	7.54	1st	6.88	1st
62	April 30, 2023	5.72	2nd	6.78	1st	6.71	1st
63	May 7, 2023	6.55	1st	7.07	1st	7.69	1st

=== Season 3 (2023–2024) ===
Ep.	Original release date	Viewers (millions) (TOTAL)	Ranking (TOTAL)	Viewers (millions) (AB)	Ranking (AB)	Viewers (millions) (ABC1)	Ranking (ABC1)
64	September 24, 2023	4.99	1st	6.03	1st	6.56	1st
65	October 1, 2023	4.97	1st	6.34	1st	6.80	1st
66	October 8, 2023	5.61	1st	6.17	1st	6.68	1st
67	October 15, 2023	5.69	2nd	6.27	2nd	6.91	2nd
68	October 22, 2023	5.72	1st	6.85	1st	7.16	1st
69	October 29, 2023	5.73	1st	6.78	1st	6.81	1st
70	November 5, 2023	6.04	1st	7.33	1st	7.79	1st
71	November 12, 2023	5.88	2nd	7.29	1st	7.39	1st
72	November 19, 2023	6.07	2nd	7.74	1st	8.24	1st
73	November 26, 2023	5.53	2nd	7.50	1st	7.40	1st
74	December 3, 2023	5.93	1st	7.01	1st	7.25	1st
75	December 10, 2023	6.00	2nd	7.44	1st	7.50	1st
76	December 17, 2023	5.64	3rd	5.97	1st	6.66	1st
77	December 24, 2023	5.24	3rd	6.44	1st	6.03	2nd
78	January 14, 2024	4.87	4th	6.40	1st	6.03	2nd
79	January 21, 2024	4.90	4th	6.13	1st	6.39	1st
80	January 28, 2024	4.50	4th	4.96	2nd	5.64	2nd
81	February 4, 2024	4.88	5th	6.10	2nd	6.05	2nd
82	February 11, 2024	4.48	4th	5.95	2nd	5.87	2nd
83	February 18, 2024	4.49	4th	5.71	2nd	5.33	2nd
84	February 25, 2024	4.52	3rd	5.59	1st	5.28	3rd
85	March 3, 2024	4.58	4th	5.93	1st	5.96	2nd
86	March 10, 2024	4.10	5th	5.19	2nd	4.98	3rd
87	March 17, 2024	5.11	5th	6.68	1st	6.25	1st
88	March 24, 2024	5.38	2nd	6.36	1st	6.85	1st
89	April 14, 2024	5.05	2nd	5.82	1st	6.23	1st
90	April 21, 2024	4.70	4th	5.67	1st	5.77	2nd
91	April 28, 2024	4.40	3rd	5.11	1st	5.43	1st
92	May 5, 2024	4.21	4th	4.52	2nd	5.19	2nd
93	May 12, 2024	4.26	3rd	4.28	2nd	5.32	1st
94	May 19, 2024	4.54	2nd	5.42	1st	6.02	1st
95	May 26, 2024	3.85	4th	4.49	2nd	5.34	1st

== Adaptations ==
- Greece – Παγιδευμένοι (Pagidevmenoi; lit. 'Trapped'), airing on ANT1
- Italy – Segreti di Famiglia, aired on Canale 5 (episodes 1-45, 45 minutes long), currently on Rete 4 (episodes 46-, 45 minutes long), published on Mediaset Infinity (complete series)
- Mexico – Secretos de Sangre, airing on Telemundo

== Accolades ==
Year	Award ceremony	Category	Recipient(s)	Result
2022	48th Golden Butterfly Awards	Best Series	Yargı	Won
2022	48th Golden Butterfly Awards	Best Actor	Kaan Urgancıoğlu	Won
2022	48th Golden Butterfly Awards	Best Actress	Pınar Deniz	Won
2022	48th Golden Butterfly Awards	Best Screenwriter	Sema Ergenekon	Won
2022	48th Golden Butterfly Awards	Best Director	Ali Bilgin	Won
2022	48th Golden Butterfly Awards	Best Couple	Pınar Deniz & Kaan Urgancıoğlu	Nominated
2023	51st International Emmy Awards	Best Telenovela	Yargı	Won
2023	49th Golden Butterfly Awards	Best Series	Yargı	Nominated
2023	49th Golden Butterfly Awards	Best Actor	Kaan Urgancıoğlu	Nominated
2023	49th Golden Butterfly Awards	Best Actress	Pınar Deniz	Won
2023	49th Golden Butterfly Awards	Best Screenwriter	Sema Ergenekon	Nominated
2023	49th Golden Butterfly Awards	Best Director	Ali Bilgin	Nominated
2023	49th Golden Butterfly Awards	Best Couple	Pınar Deniz & Kaan Urgancıoğlu	Nominated
2023	49th Golden Butterfly Awards	Achievement Award	Yargı	Won
