= İpek Filiz Yazıcı =

Turkish actress (born 2001)

- Born: 6 October 2001 (age 24); Istanbul, Turkey
- Occupation: Actress
- Years active: 2016–present
- Spouse: Ufuk Beydemir (m. 2022; div. 2025)

İpek Filiz Yazıcı (born 6 October 2001) is a Turkish actress.

== Life and career ==
Her family is from Of, Trabzon. She had her television debut in 2016 with the series Babam ve Ailesi. In 2017, she was cast in Fox TV series Kayıtdışı alongside Songül Öden, Erkan Petekkaya and Dolunay Soysert and played the character of "Tuğba Ateş". She continued her television career by a role in the TV series Elimi Bırakma, in which she had the role of "Ceyda".

She had her first leading role with the Netflix original series Aşk 101 and portrayed the character of "Işık". She was also set to have a role in the upcoming TV series Yeni Hayat, but the shooting was postponed following the measures taken due to the COVID-19 pandemic in Turkey.

Aside from her acting career, Yazıcı has appeared in commercials for LC Waikiki and Çokokrem.

== Personal life ==
In September 2020, Yazıcı tested positive for coronavirus, along with her castmates Alina Boz and Kubilay Aka, who also tested positive for the virus. In April 2021, she confirmed that she was in a relationship with singer Ufuk Beydemir. They married on 22 October 2022. The couple divorced in October 2025.

== Filmography ==
=== Television ===
Television
Year	Title	Role	Notes
2016	Babam ve Ailesi	Elif	Guest appearance
2017	Kayıtdışı	Tuğba Ateş	Supporting role
2018–2019	Elimi Bırakma	Ceyda	Supporting role
2020	Yeni Hayat	Gökçe Karatan	Supporting role
2022	Son Nefesime Kadar	Hazan	Supporting role
2022	İçimizdeki Ateş	Hale Vural	Leading role

=== Web series ===
Web series
Year	Title	Role	Notes
2017	7 Yüz	-	-
2020–2021	Aşk 101	Işık	Leading role

=== Films ===
Films
Year	Title	Role	Notes
2021	UFO	Deniz	Leading role
