= Chihong Zinc and Germanium =

Yunnan Chihong Zinc and Germanium Company Limited 云南驰宏锌锗股份有限公司
- Type: State-owned enterprise
- Industry: Zinc and germanium mining
- Founded: 2000
- Headquarters: Qujing, Yunnan, People's Republic of China
- Area served: People's Republic of China
- Key people: Chairman: Mr. Dong Ying
- Website: Yunnan Chihong Zinc and Germanium Company Limited

Yunnan Chihong Zinc and Germanium Company Limited (SSE: 600497) is the state-owned enterprise engaged in the processing, extracting, and prospecting and trading of zinc, lead, germanium, and sulfuric acid products.

The company was founded in Qujing, Yunnan, China, in 2000. It was listed on the Shanghai Stock Exchange in 2004.

In 2010, Chihong's Canadian subsidiary, Chihong Canada Mining, closed a joint venture with Selwyn Resources Ltd. for the development of a zinc-lead mining operation in the Yukon. The transaction cost CDN$100 million to complete.
