= All the Same... or Not =

Children's television series

- Portuguese: Tudo Igual... SQN!
- Genre: Comedy drama
- Based on: Na porta ao lado by Luly Trigo
- Written by: André Rodrigues; Luly Trigo
- Directed by: Juliana Vonlanten
- Starring: Gabriella Saraivah; Ana Jeckel; Duda Matte; Clara Buarque; Guilhermina Libanio; Guthierry Sotero; Ronald Sotto; Daniel Botelho; Kiko Pissolato; Miá Mello
- Country of origin: Brazil
- Original language: Portuguese
- No. of seasons: 2
- No. of episodes: 18

Production
- Production location: Rio de Janeiro
- Running time: 35–46 minutes
- Production company: Cinefilm

Original release
- Network: Disney+
- Release: May 25, 2022 – September 27, 2023

All the Same... or Not (Portuguese: Tudo Igual... SQN!) is a Brazilian comedy-drama television series for children and adolescents, which is produced by Cinefilm for Disney+. The series is based on the youth book novel Na porta ao lado by the Brazilian writer Luly Trigo. In Brazil and Portugal, the ten-part first season of the series was released on May 25, 2022, on Disney+. In the rest of the world, the show premiered on July 20, 2022.

The series was renewed for a second season, which premiered in 2023.

== Plot ==
16-year-old Carol is going through a period of major changes in her life. On one hand, Carol has to deal with her mother's marriage to her new boyfriend and the impending relationship with her future stepbrother. On the other hand, a new school year begins in high school, in which Carol starts her first real relationship and experiences various situations with her long-time friends that also put their friendship to the test. Carol faces the typical challenges of being a teenager and experiences feelings that she has never felt in this form before and learns that the first step to happiness is to know yourself and also to respect your own feelings, even if you make one or two mistakes on the way there.

== Cast ==
- Gabriella Saraivah as Carol
- Ana Jeckel as Beta
- Duda Matte as Trix
- Clara Buarque as Amanda
- Guilhermina Libanio as Pri
- Guthierry Sotero as Bruno
- Ronald Sotto as Bernardo
- Daniel Botelho as Tomás
- Kiko Pissolato as Carlos
- Miá Mello as Beth
- Julia Cortez as Tássia

== Episodes ==
No. overall	No. in season	Title	Directed by	Written by	Original release date
1	1	"Just one More Year… or Not" "É Só Mais Um Ano... SQN!"	Unknown	Unknown	May 25, 2022
2	2	"Everything Will Be Okay… or Not" "Vai Dar Tudo Certo... SQN!"	Unknown	Unknown	May 25, 2022
3	3	"Just a Friendship… or Not" "É Só Amizade... SQN!"	Unknown	Unknown	May 25, 2022
4	4	"Everything Went Wrong… or Not" "Deu Tudo Errado... SQN!"	Unknown	Unknown	May 25, 2022
5	5	"The Best Decisions… or Not" "As Melhores Escolhas... SQN!"	Unknown	Unknown	May 25, 2022
6	6	"No Secrets... or Not" "Sem Segredos... SQN!"	Unknown	Unknown	May 25, 2022
7	7	"Best Friends Forever… or Not" "Amigas Para Sempre... SQN!"	Unknown	Unknown	May 25, 2022
8	8	"Completely Lost… or Not" "Completamente Perdida... SQN!"	Unknown	Unknown	May 25, 2022
9	9	"Things Begin to Calm Down… or Not" "A Poeira Baixou... SQN!"	Unknown	Unknown	May 25, 2022
10	10	"The End… or Not" "É o Fim... SQN!"	Unknown	Unknown	May 25, 2022

== Production ==
The series was announced in December 2020 by series protagonist Gabriella Saraivah. In the video, Gabriella and the author of the series Lully Trigo, talk about the experience of recording for Disney+. The series adaptation was developed by André Rodrigues and Luly Trigo with production by Cinefilm. The recordings officially started in March 2021, in São Paulo. Due to the worsening of the COVID-19 pandemic, the recordings were suspended and resumed on May 17 and ended on July 8 of the same year. On May 6, 2022, Disney confirmed the production's premiere for May 25 of the same year. On May 10, the official poster and trailer was released.
