= Selahattin Paşalı =

Turkish actor

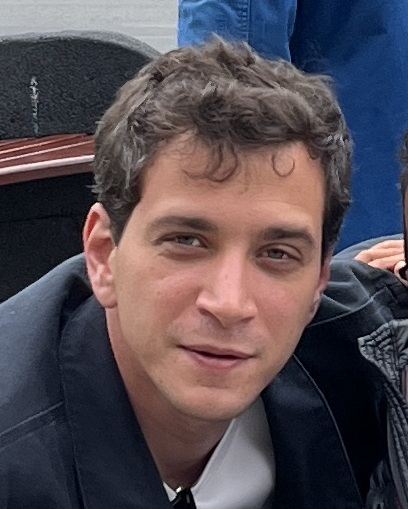
- Paşalı in 2023
- Born: 2 February 1990 (age 36); Bodrum, Turkey
- Occupation: Actor
- Years active: 2017–present
- Spouse: Lara Tümer (m. 2022)
- Children: Leyla Pera Paşalı

Selahattin Paşalı (born 2 February 1990) is a Turkish actor.

== Early life and education ==
Paşalı was born on 2 February 1990 in Bodrum. He joined Darüşşafaka Sports Club at the age of 14 and served as a team captain during his time there. He completed his education by studying Art Management in Budapest. Then he got acting training in Craft Atölye. He stepped away from sports to pursue Art Management, completing his university degree in Budapest, Hungary. He didn't begin formal acting training at the Craft Atelier in Istanbul until he was 27.

== Career ==
Paşalı made his television debut in 2017 with Show TV series Kalp Atışı. The next year he was cast in the TV series Bir Umut Yeter. In 2019, he acted in Kanal D series Leke. In 2020, he appeared in a recurring role in the TV series Babil, starring Halit Ergenç and Ozan Güven. Paşalı's breakthrough came in the same year after appearing in a main role in Netflix original series Aşk 101, portraying the character of Osman. He then appeared in the Netflix series Midnight at the Pera Palace.

== Filmography ==
=== Film ===
Year	Title	Original title	Role	Director	Notes	Ref(s)
2022	The Resistance	Mukavemet	Rahmi	Soner Caner	Leading role	
2022	Burning Days	Kurak Günler	Emre Gündüz	Emin Alper	Leading role	

=== Web ===
Year	Title	Original title	Role	Notes	Platform	Ref(s)
2020–2021	Love 101	Ask 101	Osman Demirkan	Main role; 16 episodes	Netflix	
2022–2024	Midnight at the Para Palace	Pera Palas'ta Gece Yarisi	Halit	Leading role; 14 episodes	Netflix	
2026	The Museum of Innocence	Masumiyet Müzesi	Kemal	Leading role; miniseries	Netflix	

=== Television ===
Year	Title	Original title	Role	Notes	Network	Ref(s)
2017–2018	Heartbeat	Kalp Atışı	Alp Sungur	Supporting role; 28 episodes	Show TV	
2018	Waves of Hope	Bir Umut Yeter	Arda Özkan	Supporting role; 6 episodes	Kanal D	
2019	Tainted Love	Leke	Arda Yenilmez	Supporting role; 9 episodes	Kanal D	
2020	The Choice	Babil	Hakan Yavuncu	Supporting role; 20 episodes	Star TV	
2023–2024	Ömer	Ömer	Ömer Ademoğlu	Leading role; 54 episodes	Star TV	
