= Broad Day =

Broad Day may refer to:

- "Broad Day", song from Hit-Boy on the Judas and the Black Messiah film soundtrack
- "Broad Day", song from Offset album Set It Off
- Broad Day, 2025 film starring Karon Riley
