= Kubilay Aka =

Turkish rap singer and actor (born 1995)

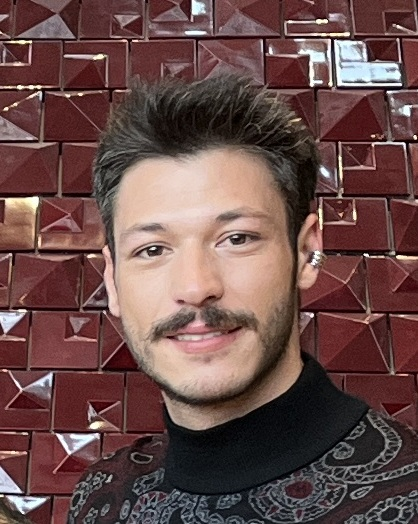
- Born: 12 April 1995 (age 31); Istanbul, Turkey
- Occupation: Actor
- Years active: 2016–present

Kubilay Aka (born 12 April 1995) is a Turkish actor.

== Life and career ==
Kubilay Aka was born in 1995. He has a degree in Airport Management from Anadolu University. He later took acting lessons and worked at an airline in Muğla before making his television debut with Kanal D series Vatanım Sensin as Ali Kemal. He had another supporting role in the popular series Çukur, in which he portrayed the character of Celasun. He had a small role in the 2017 movie Arif V 216. He was cast in a leading role in the 2018 movie Aşk Bu Mu? alongside Afra Saraçoğlu. In 2020, he had one of the main roles in Netflix original series Aşk 101, playing the role of Kerem.

== Filmography ==
=== Television ===
Television
Year	Title	Role	Notes
2016–2017	Vatanım Sensin	Ali Kemal	Supporting role
2017–2021	Çukur	Celasun	Supporting role
2021	Çok Güzel Hareketler 2	Himself	Guest appearance
2021	Cam Tavanlar	Cem	Leading role
2022	Maske Kimsin Sen?	Kuzgun	Contestant
2022	Oğlum	Bulut Yalçın	Leading role
2023	Dokuz Oğuz	Batur Karanlık	Leading role
2024–2026	İnci Taneleri	Cihan Seyhan / Özgür Yücedağ	Leading role
2026	Mercan Köşk	Aras Akıncı	Leading role

=== Film ===
Film
Year	Title	Role	Notes
2017	Arif V 216	Yakışıklı Kemal	Supporting role
2018	Aşk Bu Mu?	Umut	Leading role
2023	Sevda Mecburi İstikamet	Jön Selim	Leading role
2023	Annesinin Kuzusu	Murat Akçadağ	Leading role
2024	Zaferin Rengi	Galip Kulaksızoğlu	Leading role

=== Web series ===
Web
Year	Title	Role	Notes
2020–2021	Aşk 101	Kerem	Leading role
2021	Bunu Bi Düşünün	Cenk	Leading role
2022	Sadece Arkadaşız	Ozan	Leading role
2023	İstanbul Üçlemesi: Meze, Müzik, Muhabbet	Selim	Leading role
2024	Esas Oğlan	Tolga	Supporting role

== Theatre ==
- Hücreler – written by Engin Günaydın – BKM – 2024
- Fora – written by Hikmet Hükümenoğlu – directed by Mert Öner – Luz Creative – 2025
