= Pınar Deniz =

Turkish actress (born 1993)

- Born: 4 November 1993 (age 32); Adana, Turkey
- Education: Istanbul University
- Occupation: Actress
- Years active: 2014–present
- Spouse: Kaan Yıldırım (m. 2024)
- Children: 1

Pınar Deniz (born 4 November 1993) is a Turkish actress.

She is best known for her roles in Wounded Love (2016–2018), Love 101 (2020–2021), and Family Secrets (2021–2024), a series that won an International Emmy Award. In 2022 and 2023, she won the Golden Butterfly Award for Best Actress for her role in Family Secrets. Deniz earned two Turkish Film Critics Association Award nominations for her performances in Two Types of People (2020) and Black Night (2022).

== Life and career ==
Was born on 4 November 1993 in Adana. Her family is of Lebanese descent. Her family is one of the Arab families in the ancient and multicultural city of Mardin. She stated that she could speak Arabic as a child, but now she has forgotten it. She moved with her family to Tarabya, İstanbul, where she grew up. She graduated from the Istanbul University School of Public Relations and Advertising. She lost her maternal grandmother during the COVID-19 pandemic in Turkey.

She made her television debut in 2014 with the high school series Sil Baştan, in which she portrayed the character of Evrim. She later appeared in a music video for Murat Dalkılıç's song, "Yani". Her breakthrough came with the popular TV series Vatanım Sensin, in which she had the role of Yıldız. In 2021, she shared the leading role with Kaan Urgancıoğlu in the TV series Yargı, with whom she had previously co-starred in the Netflix original series Aşk 101.

== Personal life ==
After meeting on the set of the 2018 series Bir Deli Rüzgar, Deniz and her co-star, Berk Cankat, began a relationship. They broke up due to undisclosed reasons around December 2019.

In the summer of 2022, Deniz had been in a relationship with actor Kaan Yıldırım. They got married on 17 September 2024 in Italy.

== Filmography ==
=== Film ===
Year	Title	Original title	Role	Director	Notes
2017	My Brother 2	Kardeşim Benim 2	Didem	Mert Baykal	Supporting role
2020	Two Types of People	İnsanlar İkiye Ayrılır	Ceren	Tunç Sahin	Supporting role
2022	Doom of Love	Aşkın Kıyameti	Lydia	Hilal Saral	Leading role
2022	Black Night	Karanlık Gece	Sultan	Özcan Alper	Supporting role

=== Television ===
Year	Title	Original title	Role	Network	Notes
2014	Fresh Start	Sil Baştan	Evrim	Star TV	Leading role
2015	White Lie	Beyaz Yalanlar	Azra	Show TV	Supporting role
2015	Sunflower	Günebakanlar	Sinem	ATV	Supporting role
2016–2018	Wounded Love	Vatanım Sensin	Yıldız	Kanal D	Supporting role
2018	A Crazy Wind	Bir Deli Rüzgar	Gökçe Yücel	Fox	Leading role
2020	Call My Manager	Menajerimi Ara	Herself	Star TV	Cameo
2021	The Red Room	Kırmızı Oda	Nazlı Gündoğan	TV8	Cameo
2021–2024	Family Secrets	Yargı	Ceylin Erguvan Kaya	Kanal D	Leading role

=== Web Series ===
Year	Title	Original title	Role	Platform	Notes
2020–2021	Love 101	Aşk 101	Burcu	Netflix	Main role
2021	Think About This	Bunu Bi' Düşünün	Yağmur	BluTV	Cameo
2023	Actress	Aktris	Yasemin Derin	Disney+	Leading role

== Awards and nominations ==
Name of the award ceremony, year presented, category, nominee of the award, and the result of the nomination
Award	Year	Category	Nominated Work	Result
IKU Career Honorary Awards	2017	Most Successful Breakthrough Actress	Wounded Love	Won
IKU Career Honorary Awards	2022	Best Couple – Television Series	Family Secrets	Won
Turkish Film Critics Association Awards	2021	Best Supporting Actress	Two Types of People	Nominated
Turkish Film Critics Association Awards	2024	Best Supporting Actress	Black Night	Nominated
IMK Social Media Awards	2021	Best Actress	Family Secrets	Won
Disabled Life Foundation Awards	2022	Best Actress – Television Series	Family Secrets	Won
Disabled Life Foundation Awards	2023	Best Actress – Television Series	Family Secrets	Won
YTU Stars of the Year Awards	2022	Most Admired Cinema Actress	Two Types of People	Won
International Crystal Awards	2022	Best Couple – Television Series	Family Secrets	Won
IEEE METU Social Media Awards	2022	Most Successful Actress	Family Secrets	Won
Dizilah Güzel Awards	2022	Performer of the Year	Family Secrets	Won
Elle Style Awards	2022	Stylish Actress of the Year	Herself	Won
Face To Fast Awards	2022	Best Couple – Television Series	Family Secrets	Won
GSÜ EN Awards	2022	Best Actress – Television Series or Film	Family Secrets	Won
International Summit Awards	2022	Best Actress of the Year	Family Secrets	Won
Quality of Magazine Awards	2022	Top Quality Actress	Family Secrets	Won
Turkey Crystal Ball Awards	2022	Best Couple – Television Series	Family Secrets	Won
Yeditepe Women in Business Awards	2022	Top Working Women	Herself	Won
YTÜ Stars of the Year Awards	2022	Most Favorite Actress of the Year	Family Secrets	Won
MGD Golden Lens Awards	2022	Best Actress of the Year	Family Secrets	Won
International Izmir Film Festival Golden Artemis Awards	2022	Best Actress – Film	Two Types of People	Won
Golden Butterfly Awards	2022	Best Actress of the Year	Family Secrets	Won
Golden Butterfly Awards	2022	Best TV Couple	Family Secrets	Nominated
Golden Butterfly Awards	2023	Best TV Couple	Family Secrets	Nominated
Golden Butterfly Awards	2023	Best Actress of the Year	Family Secrets	Won
Golden 61 Awards	2022	Best Actress – Television Series	Family Secrets	Won
Produ Awards	2023	Best Actress in Foreign Series	Family Secrets	Won
