= Kaan Urgancıoğlu =

Turkish actor (born 1981)

- Born: 8 May 1981 (age 45); İzmir, Turkey
- Education: Marmara University
- Occupation: Actor
- Years active: 2002–present
- Height: 6 ft 0 in (183 cm)
- Spouse: Burcu Denizer (m. 2023)
- Parents: Serdar Urgancioglu (father); Serap Carfi (mother)

Kaan Urgancıoğlu (born 8 May 1981) is a Turkish actor. He is best known for his role as Emir Kozcuoğlu in the TV series Endless Love that was sold to more than 110 countries worldwide as well as his role as Ilgaz Kaya in Family Secrets, for which he won a Golden Butterfly Award for Best actor. Both of his series are the only Turkish series that have won an International Emmy Award.

== Life and career ==
Kaan Urgancıoğlu was born on 8 May 1981 in İzmir, Turkey. On his father's side he is of Turkish descent and on his mother's side he is of Albanian and Syrian descent. He went to the Private Turkish College Secondary School and the American College. After graduating from highschool, he moved to Istanbul in 2000 and studied at the Marmara University's Finance Department. Urgancıoğlu started to study cinema as well as university education. He graduated after 7 years. In 2002, while still at university, he started to work as an actor on the recommendation of actress Demet Akbağ, a family friend.

Urgancıoğlu had his first role as the lead actor in a series based on the historical comic book Karaoğlan. He then had a role in the youth series Kampüsistan. He played in many popular series and films afterwards. In 2008 he went to the United States and studied acting there for 6 months. He is best known for playing Emir Kozcuoğlu in Kara Sevda (Endless Love), one of the most successful Turkish series internationally and first Turkish series in history to win the International Emmy Award for "Best Telenovela", along with two other international awards. He also starred in the Netflix original series Aşk 101, which premiered in 2020. In 2021, he began starring in Yargı (Family Secrets) and shared the leading roles with Pınar Deniz, with whom he had previously co-starred in Aşk 101(Love 101). Yargı was second Turkish series in history to win the International Emmy Award for "Best Telenovela". The only two Turkish series ever to win an International Emmy Award both starred Kaan Urgancioglu in a leading role. He also took part in the movie "Operation Fortune", directed by Guy Ritchie and starring Jason Statham and Hugh Grant.

== Personal life ==
Urgancıoğlu married Burcu Denizer on 19 June 2023 in Athens, Greece.

== Filmography ==
Film			
Year	Title	Role	Notes
2005	Ispanaktan Nağmeler	-	Guest role
2006	İlk Aşk	Arif Ege	Supporting role
2007	Son Ders: Aşk ve Üniversite	Ulaş Atilla	Leading role
2009	Büşra	Titrek	Supporting role
2010	Peşpeşe	Harun	Supporting role
2014	Panzehir	Mehmet	Supporting role
2015	Uzaklarda Arama	Tayfun	Leading role
2019	Baron 2	Ehsan	Leading role/Uzbek film
2019	Gerçek Olamaz	Murat	Leading role
2022	Sen Yaşamaya Bak	Fırat	Leading role
2022	Alias Baron	Ehsan	Supporting role
2023	Operation Fortune: Ruse de Guerre	Casa	Supporting role
2024	Sen Büyümeye Bak	Fırat	Leading role
Streaming Series
Year	Title	Role	Notes
2011	Leyla ile Mecnun	Berkcan	Joined
2018	Jack Ryan	Deniz	Guest role
2020–2021	Aşk 101	Kemal	Leading role
TV series
Year	Title	Role	Notes
2002	Karaoğlan	Karaoğlan	Leading role
2003	Kampüsistan	Tolga	Leading role
2005	Yeniden Çalıkuşu	Ali	Leading role
2005	Sessiz Gece	Anıl	Supporting role
2005	Seni Çok Özledim	Ateş Erturç	Leading role
2005	Körfez Ateşi	-	Guest role
2006	Gülpare	-	Guest role
2006	Ah Polis Olsam	Nezih	Supporting role
2006	Azap Yolu	Yiğit	Supporting role
2007	Tutsak	Mehmet	Leading role
2008	Limon Ağacı	Kaan	Leading role
2009	Ayrılık	Deniz	Leading role
2009	Avrupa Yakası	Himself	Guest role
2010	Canım Ailem	Talat	Guest role
2010	Düriye'nin Güğümleri	Ümit	Supporting role
2011	Bir Ömür Yetmez	Eren	Supporting role
2012	Son	Tayfun	Supporting role
2012	Düşman Kardeşler	Mehmet	Leading role
2013	A.Ş.K.	Can	Leading role
2015	Filinta	Otto Petrovic	Supporting role
2015–2017	Kara Sevda	Emir Kozcuoğlu	Leading role
2021–2024	Yargı	Ilgaz Kaya	Leading role

== Awards and nominations ==
Year	Awards	Category	Work	Result	Ref.
2015	Ayaklı Newspaper Awards	Best Supporting Actor	Endless Love	Won	
2022	12th Unimpeded Life Foundation	Best Actor	Yargı	Won	
2022	48th Golden Butterfly Awards	Best Actor	Yargı	Won	
