= Cannon (surname) =

Cannon is a surname of Gaelic origin: in Ireland, specifically Tir Chonaill (Donegal) (North West Ireland). It is also a Manx surname, where it arose from the Goidelic "Mac Canann" meaning "son of a whelp or wolf", related to the Anglo-Irish "Mac Connon", "Connon" and similar names.

People with the surname include:

- Abraham H. Cannon (1859–1896), American Mormon leader
- Ace Cannon (1934–2018), American musician
- Aileen Cannon (born 1981), American judge
- Annie Jump Cannon (1863–1941), American astronomer
- Annie Wells Cannon (1859–1942), American politician
- Anthony Cannon (born 1984), American football player
- Arik Cannon (born 1981), American wrestler
- Barbara-Kimberly B.K. Cannon (born 1990), American actress
- Ben Cannon (born 1976), American teacher and politician
- Berry L. Cannon (1935–1969), American aquanaut
- Brendan Cannon (born 1973), Australian Rugby Union player
- Billy Cannon (1937–2018), American football player
- Catríona Cannon (born 1968), librarian and academic
- Cavendish W. Cannon (1895–1962), American diplomat
- Charles Cannon (Manitoba politician) (1866–1951), British-Canadian politician
- Charles Albert Cannon (1892–1971), American politician
- Chris Cannon (born 1950), American politician
- Ciaran Cannon (born 1965), Irish politician and publican
- Clarence Cannon (1879–1964), American politician
- Danny Cannon (born 1968), British screenwriter, director and producer
- David Cannon (disambiguation), multiple people
- Don Cannon (born 1979), American DJ, songwriter, and record producer
- Dottie Cannon, American model
- Drew Cannon (born 1990), American statistical analyst and sports writer
- Dyan Cannon (born 1937), American actress
- Edwin Bennion Cannon (1910–1963), American politician
- Ellis Cannon (born 1959), American television personality
- Emma Cannon (born 1989), American basketball player for the Israeli team Elitzur Ramla
- Ernestine Cannon (1904–1969), American ceramicist
- Esma Cannon (1905–1972), Australian actress and comedian
- Frank J. Cannon (1859–1933), American politician
- George H. Cannon (1915–1941), American Marine Corps Medal of Honor recipient
- George Q. Cannon (1827–1901), British-American religious leader and politician
- Glenn Cannon (1932–2013), American actor
- Glyn Cannon (born 1976), British playwright
- Gus Cannon (c. 1883 – 1979), American musician
- Howard Cannon (1912–2002), American politician
- Ida Maud Cannon (1877–1960), American social worker
- J. D. Cannon (1922–2005), American actor
- James Cannon (1740–1782), Scottish-American mathematician
- James Cannon Jr. (1864–1944), American bishop
- James P. Cannon (1890–1974), American politician
- James W. Cannon (born 1943), American mathematician
- James William Cannon (1852–1921), American industrialist
- Jean Cannon (1941–2005), American model
- Jim Cannon (footballer, born 1953) (born 1953), Scottish footballer
- Jimmy Cannon (1909–1973), American sports journalist
- Joe Cannon (soccer) (born 1975), American soccer player
- John Cannon (disambiguation), multiple people
- Jonathan Cannon (born 2000), American baseball player
- Joseph A. Cannon (born 1949), American businessman and politician
- Joseph Gurney Cannon (1836–1926), American politician
- Kessler R. Cannon (1915–1986), American politician
- Kevin Cannon, American cartoonist and illustrator
- Larry Cannon (disambiguation), multiple people
- Lawrence Cannon (born 1947), Canadian politician
- Lawrence A. D. Cannon (1877–1939), Canadian lawyer and politician
- Lawrence John Cannon (1852–1921), Canadian lawyer and judge
- Leslie Cannon (1920–1970), British politician
- Lou Cannon (1933–2025), American journalist, non-fiction author and biographer
- Lucien Cannon (1887–1950), Canadian lawyer and politician
- Marcus Cannon (born 1988), American football player
- Marion Cannon (1834–1920), American politician
- Marion Wadsworth Cannon (1905–1996), American poet, civil rights activist
- Martha Hughes Cannon (1857–1932), Welsh-American politician and physician
- Mary Antoinette Cannon (1884–1962), American social worker
- Max Cannon, American cartoonist
- Michael R. Cannon (born 1953), American businessman
- Newton Cannon (1781–1841), American politician
- Nick Cannon (born 1980), American actor and rapper
- Parker Cannon (born 1992), American singer
- Patrick Cannon (born 1966), American politician
- Peter Cannon (born 1951), American scholar
- Philip Cannon (composer) (1929–2016), British composer
- Philip L. Cannon (1850–1929), American politician
- Reggie Cannon (born 1998), American soccer player
- Robert Cannon (Behram Pasha) (1811–1882), British lieutenant general
- Sean Cannon (born 1940), Irish musician
- Steve Cannon (disambiguation), multiple people
- Sylvester Q. Cannon (1877–1943), American businessman and religious leader
- T. C. Cannon (1946–1978), American artist
- Tanya Cannon (born 1974), known professionally as Lezley Zen, American pornographic actress
- Tina Cannon, American politician
- Toronzo Cannon, American Blues musician
- Thomas Cannon (1720–?), English author
- Thomas Cannon (philanthropist) (1925–2005), American philanthropist
- Trenton Cannon (born 1994), American football player
- Tyrone Cannon, American psychologist
- Walter Bradford Cannon (1871–1945), American physiologist
- William Cannon (disambiguation), multiple people
- Zander Cannon (born 1972), American cartoonist

== See also ==
- General Cannon (disambiguation)
- Governor Cannon (disambiguation)
- Judge Cannon (disambiguation)
- Senator Cannon (disambiguation)
- Cannan
