= Popstar Türkiye =

Turkish music competition television series

- Genre: Reality competition
- Created by: Fremantle Media & Kanal D
- Presented by: Haldun Dormen; Gamze Özçelik
- Judges: Armağan Çağlayan; Ercan Saatçi; Ahmet San; ~~Deniz Seki~~; Zerrin Özer
- Country of origin: Turkey
- Original language: Turkish
- No. of seasons: 1
- No. of episodes: 47

Production
- Production location: Various
- Running time: 120 minutes (incl. adverts)

Original release
- Network: Kanal D
- Release: October 4, 2003 – February 7, 2004

Related
- Türkstar; Pop Idol

Popstar Türkiye (transl. Popstar Turkey) was a Turkish music competition television series based on the international franchise Popstars. The show was hosted by Haldun Dormen and Gamze Özçelik on Kanal D. The judges were Armağan Çağlayan, Ercan Saatçi, Ahmet San, and Deniz Seki later replaced by Zerrin Özer.

The TV show was a big hit on Turkish television when it was aired.

The winner of the show was Abidin Özşahin, Firdevs Güneş got second place, and Bayhan Gürhan third place. The winner was going to be sent to the United States for a musical education. But one of the judges also proposed to send the runner-up to get the same education and offered to pay for the expenses.

After Popstar Türkiye a spin-off was created named Türkstar which was broadcast on Show TV, and after that another spin-off was created named Popstar Alaturka which focused on Arabesque music. The television series also released a CD album with each contestant singing a song, and later also a Top 10 album with the best songs of each contestant.

== Auditions ==
To attract contestants, the preliminary rounds were in August and the first half of September in 2003 promoted on TV and application forms were distributed in newspapers by Kanal D under the slogan "the popstar of the future". The requirements to participate was to be at least 18 years old. A total of 3,000 people had applied to participate.

The auditions were held at:

- 2 September 2003 - İzmir Crowne Plaza
- 5 September 2003 - Antalya IC Airport
- 7 September 2003 - Adana Hilton Hotel
- 10 September 2003 - Malatya Altın Kayısı Hotel
- 12 September 2003 - Ankara Hilton Hotel
- 15 September 2003 - Samsun Büyük Samsun Hotel
- 17–18 September 2003 - Istanbul Sürmeli Hotel

Kanal D started to air the auditions on TV under the name of Popstar Aranıyor (transl. In search of the Popstar) 4 October 2003.

== Controversy ==
During the elimination rounds quite a few controversial moments happened:

- 4th week: It was revealed that Bayhan had a criminal record. And spend four years behind bars for murder.
- 5th week: After Bayhan won the first place Deniz Seki started criticizing the voters. She thought that someone with such a criminal past shouldn't be able to become a popstar. The audience started booing her, so she left the show.

That week shots were also fired on Ahmet San's jeep.

- 6th week: Zerrin Özer replaced Deniz Seki as a judge. This week also a semi-nude picture of Barış posing for the Aktüel magazine was revealed which was heavily criticized by the judges.

== Elimination chart ==
Colour key

| – | Contestant received the most public votes |
| – | Contestant received the fewest public votes and was eliminated |
| – | No elimination happened this week |

| Contestant | 1st Week 16 November 2003 | 2nd Week 23 November 2003 | 3rd Week 30 November 2003 | 4th Week 7 December 2003 | 5th Week 14 December 2003 | 6th Week 21 December 2003 | 7th Week 28 December 2003 | 8th Week 4 January 2004 | 9th Week 10 January 2004 | 10th Week 17 January 2004 | 11th Week 24 January 2004 | 12th Week 31 January 2004 | 13th Week 7 February 2004 |
|---|---|---|---|---|---|---|---|---|---|---|---|---|---|
| Abidin Özşahin | 2nd 14.14% | 2nd 13.75% | 5th 11.16% | 5th 7.56% | 3rd 9.27% | 5th 12.24% | 3rd 14.81% | 4th 16.34% | 3rd 20.28% | 2nd 26.90% | 1st 42.01% | | Winner; 52.87% |
| Firdevs Güneş | 12th 1.72% | 11th 2.67% | 6th 4.72% | 9th 2.66% | 5th 7.30% | 3rd 16.52% | 5th 14.69% | 5th 16.02% | 4th 19.63% | 1st 36.91% | 2nd 32.23% | | Runner-up; 47.13% |
| Bayhan Gürhan | 4th 10.39% | 3rd 12.17% | 2nd 15.79% | 2nd 15.63% | 1st^{(1)} 27.37% | 4th 13.51% | 4th 14.81% | 3rd 17.00% | 1st 23.04% | 3rd 20.26% | 3rd 25.76% | Eliminated (11th week) | |
| Barış Kömürcüoğlu | 3rd 12.47% | 4th 9.30% | 4th 11.31% | 1st 35.65% | 2nd 23.27% | 2nd 18.37% | 2nd 17.16% | 1st 18.50% | 2nd 21.36% | 4th 15.93% | Eliminated (10th week) | | |
| Elena Kryuchkova | 8th 2.92% | 5th 7.02% | 9th 4.20% | 7th 5.27% | 6th 6.68% | 6th 6.93% | 6th 9.20% | 2nd 18.08% | 5th 15.69% | Eliminated (9th week) | | | |
| Eser Bayar | 7th 3.06% | 10th 2.89% | 7th 4.66% | 8th 3.56% | 8th 6.30% | 1st 23.53% | 1st 21.30% | 6th 14.06% | Eliminated (8th week) | | | | |
| Selçuk Yapar | 10th 1.94% | 9th 3.48% | 10th 3.31% | 4th 10.53% | 7th 6.56% | 7th 4.64% | 7th 5.92% | Eliminated (7th week) | | | | | |
| Serkül Kan | 1st 36.21% | 1st 30.79% | 1st 25.54% | 3rd 10.81% | 4th 8.29% | 8th 4.26% | Eliminated (6th week) | | | | | | |
| Aydan Kaya | 5th 8.43% | 6th 6.50% | 3rd 11.35% | 6th 5.83% | 9th 4.96% | Eliminated (5th week) | | | | | | | |
| Alpay Kulay | 9th 2.80% | 8th 3.58% | 8th 4.66% | 10th 2.50% | Eliminated (4th week) | | | | | | | | |
| Evren Mevlanaoğlu | 6th 4.07% | 7th 5.27% | 11th 3.30% | Eliminated (3rd week) | | | | | | | | | |
| Ceyda Mazalto | 11th 1.72% | 12th 2.58% | Eliminated (2nd week) | | | | | | | | | | |
| Müge Ökten | 13th 0.83% | Eliminated (1st week) | | | | | | | | | | | |

Note

- ^{1} Judge Deniz Seki criticized Bayhan over his criminal past when he won the first place, the crowd booed her which made her leave the TV show on the spot, not wanting to return as judge as long as Bayhan was still a contestant on the show. The next week she was replaced by Zerrin Özer.

== Discography ==
- Popstar Türkiye - Various artists (December 2003)
- Popstar Top 10 En İyi Performans Şarkıları - Various artists (2004)
