= Canaan (disambiguation) =

Canaan (Hebrew: כנען) (Arabic: كنعان) was the ancient region of the Levant. It is also a Semitic personal name or surname used by Arabic and Hebrew-speaking people.

Canaan may also refer to:

== Places ==
=== Canada ===
- Rural Municipality of Canaan No. 225, Saskatchewan
- Canaan, New Brunswick
- Canaan River, New Brunswick
- Canaan, Kings County, Nova Scotia
- Canaan, Lunenburg County, Nova Scotia
- Canaan, Yarmouth County, Nova Scotia

=== United States ===
- Canaan, Connecticut, a town
- Canaan (CDP), Connecticut, a village in the town of North Canaan
- Canaan, Indiana
- Canaan, Maine
- Canaan, Mississippi
- Canaan, New Hampshire, a New England town
  - Canaan (CDP), New Hampshire, the main village in the town
- Canaan, New York
- Canaan, Pennsylvania
- Canaan, Vermont, a New England town
  - Canaan (CDP), Vermont, a village in the town
- Canaan, West Virginia
- Canaan Township, Athens County, Ohio
- Canaan Township, Madison County, Ohio
- Canaan Township, Morrow County, Ohio
- Canaan Township, Wayne County, Ohio
- Canaan Valley, West Virginia
- New Canaan, Connecticut
- North Canaan, Connecticut
  - Canaan (village), Connecticut
- South Canaan Township, Wayne County, Pennsylvania
- Canaan Township (disambiguation)

=== West Indies ===
- Canaan, Trinidad, a town in Trinidad and Tobago
- Canaan, Tobago
- Canaan, United States Virgin Islands
- Canaan, Haiti
- Colinas de Canaan, a neighborhood in Santo Domingo, Dominican Republic

== People and biblical figures ==
- Tawfiq Canaan (1882–1964), Palestinian physician and researcher of popular heritage
- Isaiah Canaan (born 1991), American basketball player
- Islam Cana'an (born 1983), Palestinian-Israeli footballer
- Canaan Banana (1936–2003), first president of Zimbabwe
- Canaan (son of Ham), son of Ham and grandson of Noah in the Old Testament

== Video games ==
- Canaan, a location in Final Fantasy III, a role-playing video game
- The Mystical Land of Canaan, a location in Tales of Xillia 2
- Canaan, the biblical setting for The Settlers of Canaan, a multiplayer board game
- Canaan, a character in the Xenosaga video game series
- Canaan, one of many visitable "Anteverses" in Abiotic Factor, a first-person survival video game

== Other uses ==
- Canaan (TV series), a 2009 action/adventure anime based on the 428: Shibuya Scramble video game
- Canaan Creative, a computer hardware manufacturer making bitcoin miners
- Canaan Dog, the national dog breed of Israel
- Canaan Records, a Christian record label

== See also ==
- Canaanism, a Jewish cultural and ideological movement founded in 1939
- Cannan, a surname of Manx origin
- K'naan, stage name of Canadian-Somalian hip-hop artist Keinan Abdi Warsame (born 1978)
- Kanaan, a surname
- Kanan (disambiguation)
