= Bayhan Gürhan =

Turkish arabesque singer (born 1980)

- Born: 14 March 1980 (age 45); Adana, Turkey
- Occupation: Singer-songwriter
- Musical career
- Genres: Arabesque
- Years active: 2003–present
- Label: DMC
- Website: www.bayhangurhan.com

Bayhan Gürhan (born 14 March 1980) is a Turkish arabesque singer who became famous after participating in Popstar Turkey.

== Personal life ==
Bayhan Gürhan was born on 14 March 1980 in Adana. At an early age, he was interested in arabesque, Indian, and Arabic music. At the age of six he lost his mother and with the remaining of his family moved to Germany. There he learned to speak German. At the age of nine, he was taken into custody by the German Child Protective Services. He had a good ear for music which did not go unnoticed. Because of that he was allowed to perform on his flute from time to time at the church of the CPS, and briefly took piano lessons there. He eventually returned to Turkey in 1991. Between 1998 and 2000 he had spent time in prison for murder of his cousin.

In 2003 he was a contestant in the first season of Popstar Turkey on Kanal D with judges Ercan Saatçi, Deniz Seki, and Armağan Çağlayan. After the third week of the show, it was revealed that Gürhan had spent time in prison for killing a woman. When this got revealed in the media he was devastated. In the fourth week of the show judge Deniz Seki started to criticize him in the show over this. In the fifth week of the show he won the first place. This time Seki started to criticize the voters. The audience started to boo her which made her leave the contest. She was replaced in the sixth week by Zerrin Özer. Gürhan eventually finished in third place.

After the contest he released an album named Hayal Edemiyorum in 2004 and Kısa Veda in 2009.

In 2010 he performed at the Afyon Jazz Festival singing songs of Frank Sinatra, Andy Williams, and Louis Armstrong. In 2012 he appeared on STV in Hamdi Alkan's TV series Kendimize Doğru. He also appeared on Kanal D's TV series Ankara'nın Dikmen'i as a guest actor. In 2013 he presented the documentary Benim Yolum (English: My Way) about street musicians. In 2015 during the month of Ramadan, he played the character of Bekir in the radio show Direkler Arası on TRT İstanbul Kent Radio. In October 2016 he appeared on Star TV's Zuhal Topal'la İzdivaç (English: Marriage with Zuhal Topal), because he wanted to get married, but later left the show.

In 2017 Gürhan had sent a wreath of flowers to Deniz Seki's concert. Seki had recently been released from prison for drug trafficking. She responded on social media by stating that it had been a while since she made amends with Gürhan over her behavior in Popstar Turkey. She appreciated the gesture and said that they were on good terms now.

== Discography ==
=== Albums ===
Year	Title
2004	Hayal Edemiyorum
2008	Vurdumduymaz
2009	Kısa Veda
2011	Yalan
2011	Yenildim
2011	Cezayir Menekşesi
2013	Şafak Türküsü

=== Collaborative albums ===
Year	Title
2003	Popstar Türkiye
2004	Popstar Top 10 En İyi Performans Şarkıları

=== Singles ===
Year	Title
2008	Hoşgörülü Olmalıyız
2008	Bir Ben Mi
2008	Fırtına Sevda
2008	Kısa Sevda
2008	İnceden
2008	Hiç Bir Affın Yok

== Filmography ==
=== TV series ===
Year	Title	Role	Notes
2012	Kendimize Doğru	Ayhan	First role
2013	Arif Pancar	Arif Pancar	–
2014	Ankara'nın Dikmen'i	Himeself	Guest actor
2025	Gassal	Soloist	Second season

=== Television appearance ===
- Popstar Turkey (2003) – Contestant
- Mavi Şeker (2008) – Guest
- Akşam Keyfi (2009) – Guest
- Çarkıfelek (2012)
- Arım Balım Peteğim (2011) – Duet with Azer Bülbül
- Ben Burdan Atlarım (2013)
- Benim Yolum (2013) – Himself (host)
- Gündem Özel (2014)- Guest
- İnsanlık Hali (2016) – Guest
- Zuhal Topal'la İzdivaç (2016) – Candidate
