= Thomas Cannon =

Thomas Cannon may refer to:

- Thomas Cannon (author), 18th-century British author
- Tom Cannon Sr. (1846–1917), British flat racing jockey and trainer
- Tom Cannon (wrestler) (born 1852), British wrestler
- Tom Cannon (footballer, born 1891), English footballer, see List of Bury F.C. players (1–24 appearances)
- Thomas Cannon (philanthropist) (1925–2005), American philanthropist
- Tommy Cannon (born 1938), British comedian
- Tom Cannon (footballer) (born 2002), Irish footballer
- T. C. Cannon (Tommy Wayne Cannon, 1946–1978), Native American artist
