= Ebru Cündübeyoğlu =

Turkish actress, singer and writer (born 1974)

- Born: 10 September 1974 (age 51); Heilbronn, West Germany
- Education: Uludağ University School of Economics and Administrative Sciences
- Occupation: Actress
- Years active: 1997–present
- Spouse: Güçlü Mete (m. 2003; div. 2022)
- Children: 1
- Awards: Full list

Ebru Cündübeyoğlu (born 10 September 1974) is a Turkish actress, singer, and writer.

She became widely known at a young age by hosting television programs, and subsequently worked as a theatre, film, and television actress. She published her first poetry book in 2005 and her first novel in 2019.

== Life ==
=== Early life and education ===
She was born on 10 September 1974, in Heilbronn, West Germany. She is the only child of dentist Ertuğrul Cündübeyoğlu and Hülya Cündübeyoğlu, who was one of the 1970 Turkish beauty queens. She completed her secondary education in Istanbul and Adapazarı, and completed her higher education in the Economics Department of the Faculty of Economics and Administrative Sciences at Uludağ University.

=== Career ===
In 1993, she participated in the Turkish beauty pageant and, in the same competition in which her mother had been fourth in 1970, she was also selected as the fourth Turkish beauty queen. She began working in television that same year. Between 1993 and 1997, she hosted and worked on numerous entertainment programs, beginning with the program Bir Başka Gece, which was broadcast on TRT. By hosting the weekday live current-affairs and entertainment program Sabah Şekerleri, she became known to a large audience in Turkey while still in her twenties.

She began her television acting career in 1997 with her role in the series Gülüm, and began her theatre acting career in 1999 by playing the role of Mihriban in the comedy Fehimpaşa Konağı, staged by the Sadri Alışık Theatre. Some of her television roles include lawyer Ayşegül in Deli Yürek, teacher Deniz in Koçum Benim, Sevilay in Omuz Omuza, İpek in Yalancı Romantik, Gülbahar in Avrupa Avrupa, and Seray in Evli ve Öfkeli. She continued her theatre career in 2008 with roles such as Feride during the period when she goes to Anatolia in the play Çalıkuşu, staged by Tiyatro Kedi, and Nicole in Kibarlık Budalası. In 2018, she continued with roles such as the character Cansu in the comedy Ölü'n Bizi Ayırana Dek, staged by Gergedan Yapım.

Cündübeyoğlu, who wrote poetry in the early 2000s, published her first poetry book, Aşılı Kolum, in 2005. Her poems explored themes including longing for childhood, love, separation, aging, and the transience of life.

In 2013, to mark her 20th year in the arts, she released the Turkish classical music album Sevdiğim Şarkılar. In subsequent years, she released the singles Dertlerimi Zincir Yaptım and Kalbimin Efendisi. The album Sevdiğim Şarkılar included a song composed by her, Neyledin Yar.

At the age of 40, she realized that she had dyslexia. She sought to raise awareness about dyslexia and learning difficulties by giving talks and sharing her own story.

Her first novel, Ferda, was published in 2019. In the novel, she tells in the inner voice of the character the story of a woman with Alzheimer's disease who is a writer.

=== Personal life ===
In 2003, she married radio presenter Mert Güçlü Mete. The couple divorced in 2022. The couple had a daughter named Duru in 2005.

== Theatre ==
Year	Title	Role	Writer	Venue
1999–2000	Fehim Paşa Konağı	Mihriban	Turgut Özakman	Tiyatro Bakış Akatlar Cultural Centre
xxx	Deliler			
2002–2003	Yalandan Kim Ölmüş			
2007	Le Bourgeois gentilhomme		Molière	Kedi Sahne Sanatları; Duru Ataşehir
2008	Çalıkuşu		Reşat Nuri Güntekin	Kedi Sahne Sanatları
2015	Ölün Bizi Ayırana Dek		Murat Dişli; Alper Atalan; Zeki Enes Akkan	Watergarden Performance Centre
2017	Lost in Yonkers		Neil Simon	Tiyatrokare

== Filmography ==
Year	Title	Role	Notes
1998	Ruhsar	Diana	
1998	Gülüm		
1999	Güneşe Doğru	Ufuk, the Journalist	
1999–2002	Deli Yürek	Ayşegül	
2002–2003	Koçum Benim	Deniz	
2003	Çınaraltı		
2004–2005	Omuz Omuza	Sevilay	
2006	Gizli Patron	Türkan	
2007	Şöhret Okulu	Jale	
2007–2008	Kuzey Rüzgârı	Mukadder	
2008	Komedi Dükkanı		Appeared as a guest actor in the second season.
2008–2010	Yalancı Romantik	İpek Gökova	Appeared in seasons 1 and 2.
2011	Kalbim Seni Seçti	Handan	
2011–2013	Avrupa Avrupa	Gülbahar Koparan	Appeared in seasons 1 and 2.
2012	Yalan Dünya		Appeared as a guest actor.
2012	Hititya: Madalyonun Sırrı	Anne	
2014	Galip Derviş	Pelin Öztürk	Appeared as a guest actor in the third season.
2015	Kocan Kadar Konuş	Nur	
2015	Mu Tiya Mu the Mysterious Melody	Asya	
2015–2016	Evli ve Öfkeli	Seray	
2016	Kocan Kadar Konuş: Diriliş	Nur	
2018	Gülizar	Suzan	
2019	Solgun Ağaçlar Altında		
2021	Doğduğun Ev Kaderindir	Özlem	
2022	Senden Daha Güzel	Pervin Soylu	
2022	Çakallarla Dans 6	Manolya	
2023	Altın Kafes	Nalan Beyoğlu	
2024–2026	Arka Sokaklar	Candan Ceylanlı	
2024	Gassal	Buse, the mobster's wife	

Programs hosted
Year	Program	Network
1993	Bir Başka Gece	TRT 1
	Pazar Şöleni	Star TV
	Salı Pazarı	Star TV
	Şamata	Star TV
	Yakın Takip	
	Magazinname	
	Çalar Saat	
1996	Sabah Şekerleri	atv

=== Music videos ===
Albums
Year	Title	Label	Ref.
2013	Sevdiğim Şarkılar	Poll Production	
2015	Dertlerimi Zincir Yaptım (single)	Poll Production	

== Bibliography ==
Year	Title	Publisher	Ref.	ISBN
2005	Aşılı Kolum (poetry book)	Pınar		ISBN 978-9753481991
2019	Ferda	Hep Kitap		ISBN 978-6051922904

== Awards ==
Year	Award	Category	Work	Ref.	Result
1993	Miss Turkey Beauty Pageant	4th runner-up			
2022	2nd International Diamond Awards	Theatre Actress of the Year	Ölün Bizi Ayırana Dek		Won
