= Furfur =

Goetic demon

Seal of Furfur (Ars Goetia)

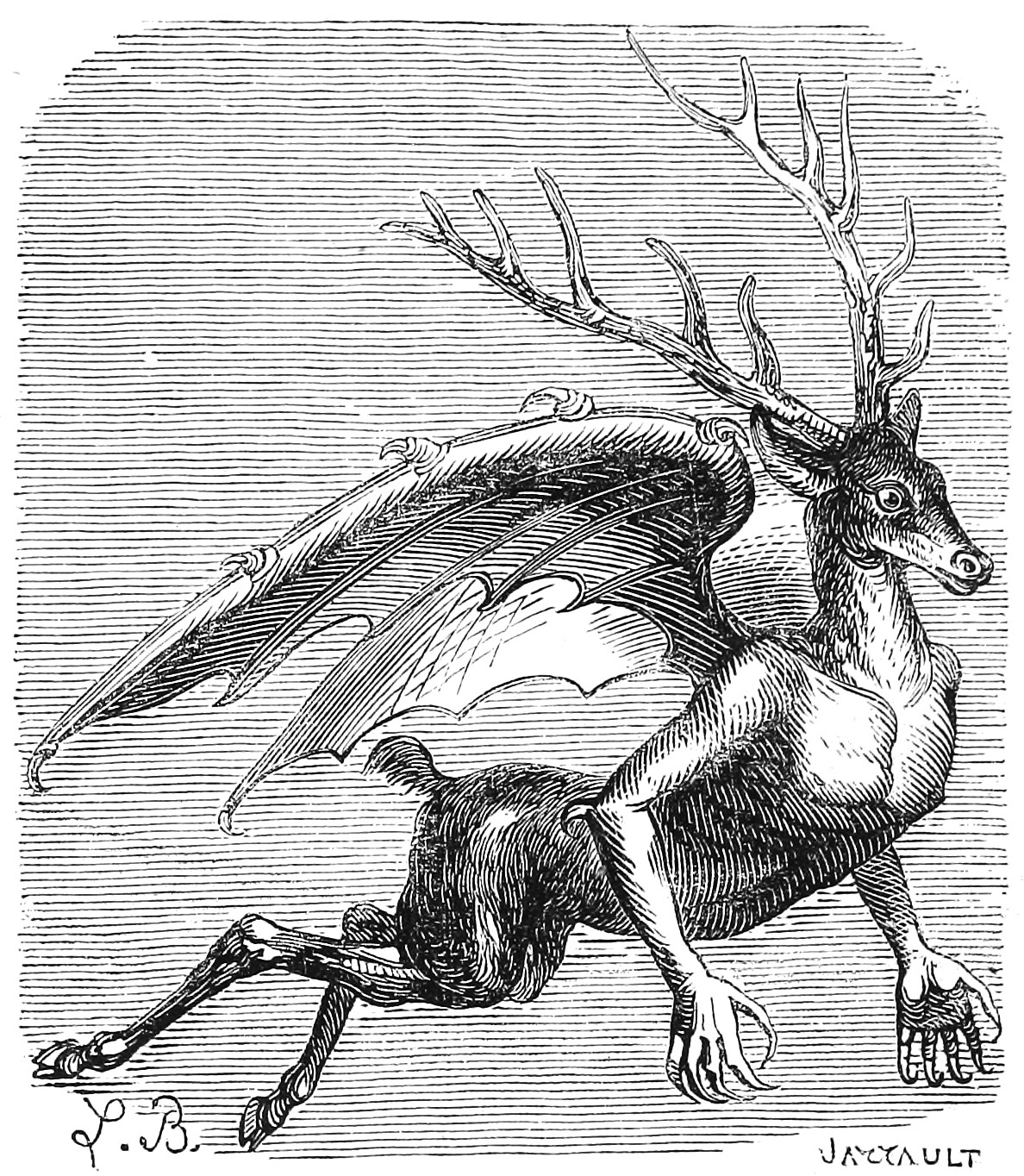
Image of Furfur from Collin de Plancy's Dictionnaire Infernal.

In demonology, Furfur (other spelling: Furtur, Ferthur) is a powerful Great Earl of Hell, being the ruler of twenty-six legions of demons. He is a liar even when compelled to enter a magic triangle, where he answers questions, speaking with a rough voice. Furfur causes love between two people, creates storms, tempests, thunder, lightning, and teaches on secret and divine things.

He is depicted as a deer or winged deer, and also as an angel. To some authors he changes from deer into angel when compelled to enter the magic triangle.

== Furfur in Latin ==
'Furfur' or 'furfures' in Latin means "bran". However it seems more likely that the name is a corruption of 'furcifer', the Latin word for scoundrel.

== In popular culture ==
- Furfur is portrayed as a horned, red-skinned man in the anime and manga series Welcome to Demon School! Iruma-kun.
- Furfur is a high-level demon depicted using lightning abilities in the anime and manga series Blue Exorcist.
- He makes brief optional appearances as a passive antagonist in the video game Voices of the Void. As part of a crossover, he also appears in Abiotic Factor.
- Furfur is also a character in the comedy-fantasy TV series Good Omens portrayed by Reece Shearsmith, and is depicted as a demon working for hell.
- Furfur and Zepar are depicted in Umineko When They Cry as androgynous twin demons who are friends of the witch Beatrice.
- Furfur, in student folklore at The University of Missouri-Columbia, is said to be responsible for the campus fire in 1892, and is frequently blamed for mischief, small fires, and misfortune around campus. He is regularly featured in student jokes on social media, and is a popular Halloween costume for students.

== See also ==
- The Lesser Key of Solomon
- Peryton

== Sources ==
- S. L. MacGregor Mathers, A. Crowley, The Goetia: The Lesser Key of Solomon the King (1904). 1995 reprint: ISBN 0-87728-847-X. Page 45
