= Türkstar =

- Created by: Simon Fuller
- Starring: Haldun Dormen; Gamze Özçelik; Zerrin Özer
- Country of origin: Turkey
- No. of seasons: 1

Original release
- Network: Show TV
- Release: 2004 – 2004

- Finalists (with dates of elimination)
Emrah Keskin	Winner
Simge Bağdatlı	19 June
Sertaç Yanmaz	12 June
Ufuk Çakir	5 June
Abedin Sakirov	29 May
Faruk Emre Kürklüoğlu	22 May
Ahmet Gülsen	15 May
Meltem Denizci & Emrah Gökelma	8 May
Sevil Kul	1 May
Seçil Hüner Ünsal	24 April
Açelya Kılıç	17 April
Yusuf Emre Uzunca	10 April
Banu Ekşi	3 April

Türkstar is a 2004 Turkish reality television singing competition show based on the British show Pop Idol. It was hosted by Seray Sever, Gamze Özçelik and Haldun Dormen. It had extremely low ratings and only lasted one season.

Türkstar is notable for being the only Idol franchise to have featured a singing duo (Meltem Denizci and Emrah Gökelma).

== Auditions ==
The first series of Türkstar had nine audition cities to find the best talent in all of Turkey, including:

- Adana
- Ankara
- Antalya
- Diyarbakır
- Edirne
- Istanbul
- İzmir
- Trabzon
- Munich, Germany

== Türkstar Jury ==
- Zerrin Özer - Turkish singer.
- Armağan Çağlayan - A&R BMG France.
- Ercan Saatçi - Songwriter & musician.
- Ahmet San - Musician & choreographer.

== Contestants ==
Meltem Denizci & Emrah Gökelma until now remain as the only duo to participate on an Idol show worldwide (auditioned, performed and got voted off together).

Two members of the top 3, Simge Bağdatlı and Sertaç Yanmaz, were born and raised in Germany. The latter was a semifinalist on the first season of Türkstars German equivalent Deutschland sucht den Superstar.

== Semi Final Qualifyings ==
Top 30
Format: 4 out of 10 making it in each week + one Wildcard

Date	First	Second	Third	Fourth
March 11	Meltem Denizci & Emrah Gökelma	Simge Bağdatlı	Emrah Keskin	Faruk Emre Kürklüoğlu
March 18	Ahmet Gülsen	Açelya Kılıç	Yusuf Emre Uzunca	Banu Ekşi
March 25	Sertaç Yanmaz	Abedin Sakirov	Ufuk Çakir	Sevil Kul
Wildcard	Seçil Hüner Ünsal			

== Finalists ==
(ages stated at time of contest)

Contestant	Age	Hometown	Voted Off	Liveshow Theme
Emrah Keskin	19	Trabzon	Winner	Grand Finale
Simge Bağdatlı	26	Germany	June 19, 2004	Grand Finale
Sertaç Yanmaz	21	Germany	June 12, 2004	
Ufuk Çakir	29		June 5, 2004	
Abedin Sakirov	17	Germany	May 29, 2004	
Faruk Emre Kürklüoğlu	21	Ankara	May 22, 2004	
Ahmet Gülsen	23	İzmir	May 15, 2004	
Meltem Denizci & Emrah Gökelma	22 & 24	Edirne	May 8, 2004	
Sevil Kul	21	Germany	May 1, 2004	
Seçil Hüner Ünsal	30	Antalya	April 24, 2004	
Açelya Kılıç	20	İzmir	April 17, 2004	
Yusuf Emre Uzunca	22	Ankara	April 10, 2004	
Banu Ekşi	24	İzmir	April 3, 2004	
