= Gassal =

- Series poster
- Genre: Comedy; Drama
- Created by: Sümeyye Karaarslan
- Screenplay by: Sümeyye Karaarslan
- Directed by: Selçuk Aydemir (1-20); Onur Tan (21-); Sümeyye Karaarslan (21-)
- Starring: Ahmet Kural; Hande Soral
- Opening theme: "Tebessüm" by Antalya Children's Choir
- Composers: Şahin Kendirci; Suat Sakarya
- Country of origin: Turkey
- Original language: Turkish
- No. of seasons: 4
- No. of episodes: 40

Production
- Producer: Seyma Eraz Çelik
- Production locations: Istanbul; Kocaeli
- Running time: 30–35 minutes
- Production company: Zera Medya

Original release
- Network: tabii
- Release: 21 December 2024 – 19 November 2026

Gassal (The Late Offices) is a Turkish drama and comedy web series produced in 2024 and released on TRT's streaming platform tabii. Ahmet Kural stars in the lead role joined by Hande Soral in the second season.

== Plot ==
Baki, whose profession is being a gassal (ritual body washer), searches for someone to wash his own funeral while also questioning his loneliness after facing death.

== Cast ==
- Ahmet Kural as Baki
- Hande Soral as Nihan
- Erdal Cindoruk as Aziz
- Ebru Cündübeyoğlu as Mafia wife Buse
- Mesut Akusta as Haris
- Serkan Ercan as Nazım
- Demir Karahan as Hüseyin
- Hakan Vanlı as Nizammeddin
- Begüm Öner as Çiğdem
- Serhat Kılıç as Muzaffer
- Ceren Soylu as Feyruz
- Zerrin Sümer as Emine
- Kenan Çoban as Mülayim
- Nazan Kesal as Saniye
- Ercan Kesal as Melih
- Timuçin Esen as Kadir
- Yunus Emre Yıldırımer as Güngör
- Öykü Gürman as Güzel
- Yasemin Sakallıoğlu as nurse Tutku
- Sibel Aytan as Elif
- Muharrem Türkseven as Ahmet
- Ezgi Özyürekoğlu as Neslihan
- Mehmet Güzel as Merdan
- Ferhan Vural as Nadir
- Safa Tabur as Çetin
- Serkan Kuru as Fatih
- Emir Benderlioğlu as Affan
- Teoman Akı as Erdem (Season 1)
- Mete Akı as Erdem (Season 2)
- Yağız Ata Dinçer as Ali
- Afra Zeynep Taşkın as Zeynep Neva
- Mazlum Kiper as Doctor
- Meral Çetinkaya as Hatice

== Series overview ==
Season	Episodes	Originally released	Network
1	10	December 21, 2024	tabii
2	10	May 24, 2025	tabii
3	10	April 10, 2026	tabii
4	10	November 19, 2026	tabii

Each episode ends with a song performed by the main singer of that season.

=== Season 1 (2024) ===
No. overall	No. in season	Title	Song Title	Artist	Original release date
1	1	Ben, Gassal	"Çocuk Oldum"	Şahin Kendirci	December 21, 2024
2	2	Kim Ölecek, Kim Kalacak Nazım?	"Gülüm Benim"	Şahin Kendirci	December 21, 2024
3	3	Helvalar ve Sırları	"Benim İçin Üzülme"	Şahin Kendirci	December 21, 2024
4	4	Ölünün Manzaraya İhtiyacı Olmaz	"Bu Şehir Beni Boğuyor"	Şahin Kendirci	December 21, 2024
5	5	Merak Ettim... Neden Evlenmezmişsin Benimle?	"Bana Sor"	Şahin Kendirci	December 21, 2024
6	6	Servis, Cüzdan, Aşk ve Ölüm	"Kaderimin Oyunu"	Şahin Kendirci	December 21, 2024
7	7	Kimsenin İstemediği Bir Adam	"Yıkılmışım Ben"	Şahin Kendirci	December 21, 2024
8	8	Herkes Gitti, Ben Kaldım	"İçim Yanar"	Şahin Kendirci	December 21, 2024
9	9	Hiç Bilmeseydim Özgürdüm...	"Sevme"	Şahin Kendirci	December 21, 2024
10	10	Sen, Ben ve Çocuklar	none		December 21, 2024

=== Season 2 (2025) ===
No. overall	No. in season	Title	Song Title	Artist	Original release date
11	1	9 Ay Beklememiş Bir Baba	"Efendim İşitmedim"	Bayhan	May 24, 2025
12	2	Gül Suyu ve Zemzemin Muhteşem Aroması	"Vay Delikanlı Gönlüm"	Bayhan	May 24, 2025
13	3	Şöyle Görkemli Bir Cenaze	"Gülpembe"	Bayhan	May 24, 2025
14	4	Burçların En Güzeli	"Salını Salını"	Bayhan	May 24, 2025
15	5	Ölen Anneanneler, Öldüren Anneanneler	"Mesele"	Bayhan	May 24, 2025
16	6	Benim Adım Neden Baki?	"Olmaz Olsun"	Bayhan	May 24, 2025
17	7	Aşktan Başka Sebepler	"Müjgan"	Bayhan	May 24, 2025
18	8	Güler Yüzün Yakışmadığı Meslek	"Seni Anan Benim İçin Doğurmuş"	Bayhan	May 24, 2025
19	9	Teneşirde Ölenler, Teneşirde Doğanlar	"Yol Arkadaşım"	Bayhan	May 24, 2025
20	10	Çirkin Değiliz... Hiçbirimiz	"Rüzgar"	Bayhan	May 24, 2025

=== Season 3 (2026) ===
No. overall	No. in season	Title	Song Title	Artist	Original release date
21	1	Sosyal Perdeler ve Sümüklü Böcek Yalnızlığı	Kiraz Dalı	Kubat	10 April 2026
22	2	Menemenler ve Sofralar	Değme Felek	Kubat	10 April 2026
23	3	Pratik İşlere Yer Yok	Yekte	Kubat	10 April 2026
24	4	Gassal Olunmaz Doğulur	Gönlüm Ataşlara Yandı	Kubat	10 April 2026
25	5	Bana Ölümden Bahset. Bir de Ağlamaktan...	Yüce Dağ Başında (Perişanım)	Kubat	10 April 2026
26	6	Tek Bir Taş	Evlenmirem	Kubat	10 April 2026
27	7	İnsan Dediğin Çocukluğu Kadar	Mevlam Birçok Dert Vermiş	Kubat	10 April 2026
28	8	Bir Anne Neden Ölür?	Babuba	Kubat	10 April 2026
29	9	Son Akşam Yemeği	Ayletme Beni	Kubat	10 April 2026
30	10	Ölüm, Dilime Dolanan Bir Şarkı Gibi...	Çalın Davulları; Sen Gideli	Kubat	10 April 2026
