= Kanaan =

Kanaan may refer to:

== Surname ==
Kanaan is a surname. Notable people with the surname include:

- Ahmad Kanaan (born 1965), Palestinian Arab painter and sculptor
- Ghazi Kanaan (1942–2005), Syrian interior minister from 2004 to 2005 and long-time head of Syria's security apparatus in Lebanon
- Ibrahim Kanaan (born 1962), Maronite Lebanese politician
- Michael Kanaan (born 1975), Australian gangster and murderer
- Mohammed Kna'an or Kanaan (born 2000), Palestinian footballer
- Ramsey Kanaan, Lebanese-Scottish publisher and distributor of anarchist literature, former singer of the Scottish anarcho-punk band Political Asylum
- Seif Adnan Kanaan (died 2004), Iraqi citizen who was abducted in Iraq and beheaded
- Taleb Kanaan (born 1974), Lebanese journalist
- Tony Kanaan (born 1974), Brazilian race car driver

== Given name ==
Kanaan is a given name. Notable people with the name include:

- Kanaan Carlyle (born 2004), American basketball player

== See also ==
- Canaan (disambiguation)
- Cannan, a surname of Manx origin
