= Edwin Cannon =

Edwin Cannon may refer to:

- Edwin Bennion Cannon (1910–1963), Utah politician
- Edwin Q. Cannon (1918–2005), Utah politician and businessman
