= Filiz Taçbaş =

Turkish actress and tennis player

- Born: 1964 (age 61–62); İzmir, Turkey
- Occupations: Actress, tennis player
- Years active: 1986–present
- Spouse: Cahit Yavuz (m. 2000; div. 2011)
- Children: 1

Filiz Taçbaş (born 1964) is a Turkish film and television series actress and former national tennis player.

== Early life ==
Filiz Taçbaş was born in İzmir, Turkey in 1964. She is of Azerbaijani descent.

Already at age ten, she appeared as child actress in the film Bacım (literally "My Sister"), written and directed by Bilge Olgaç. In 1981, she won the first place in the "Fresh Faces" beauty contest organized by the children's magazine Saklambaç. She started acting in the Theatre Abdullah Şahin. She played on stage with Defne Yalnız, Müjdat Gezen, Abdullah Şahin, Enis Fosforoğlu and Teoman Aksoy. She also worked as a model at the fashion shows of fashion designer Zühal Yorgancıoğlu abroad.

== Actress ==
She continued her acting career in films after a long break. In 1987, she appeared in the film Aile Pansiyonu with Adile Naşit.

Her recognition by a wide audience came in 1992 with her role in the TV series Mahallenin Muhtarları (literally: "Representatives of the Neighborhood"). She played the character "Behiye" in the TV series until 2002. Between 2006 and 2014, Taçbaş played in the TV crime series Arka Sokaklar ("Back Streets") in the role of teacher "Ayla Soylu", the wife of Chief Superintendent "Rıza Soylu", played by Zafer Ergin. She acted in the TV series Ah Neriman with Perran Kutman in 2014. In 2020, she joined the cast of the TV series Çukur ("Pit").

== Tennis player ==
Taçbaş played tennis professionally. In 2007, after getting a high score, she was admitted to the national team qualifiers, and became a member of the Turkey national team. She also writes columns on tennis in newspapers. She was the tennis partner of Hülya Avşar.

== Private life ==
In 2000, she married tennis coach and tennis court manager Cavit Yavuz, whom she met during a tennis tournament about a year before. She gave birth to their daughter Selin in 2002. The couple divorced in 2011.

Tired of city life, in early 2020 Taçbaş moved to Aliağa in İzmir Province, where she purchased 1.5 daa (0.37 acres) of agricultural land. She obtained a farming certificate from the local Directorate of Agriculture, Forestry and Rural Affairs. She started agriculture farming by growing olive, lemon, and various fruits in her field.

For her acting career, she commutes between Aliağa and the film set in Istanbul.

== Filmography ==
=== Films ===
Year	Title
1974	Bacım
1979	Önce İnsan
1986	Korkusuz
1986	İntikamcı
1986	Asi Kabadayı
1987	Aile Pansiyonu
1988	Ferman
1988	Bacım
1989	Elveda Mutluluklar
1989	Bu Şehrin Geceleri
1990	Ölürayak
1990	Eskici ve Oğulları
1990	Afacan Ateş Parçasi
1992	Fırtına Kuşu
1992	Bizim Eller
1994	Gönül Bahçelerinde
1999	Yaşama Hakkı
2018	Moral Compensation

=== Short films ===
Year	Title
1993	Ömer Seyfettin: Bomba
	Wrinkle

=== Videos ===
Year	Title
(1987)	Randevu
1987	Alman Gelin
1988	Belalı Gelin
1990	İşte Suzan

=== TV series ===
Year	Title
1989	Doktorlar
1992 2002	'Mahallenin Muhtarları
1994 1995	Geçmişin İzleri
	Şimdiki Aklım Olsaydı
2002 2004	Koçum Benim
2004	Bütün Çocuklarım
2006 2011	Arka SokaklarFirst Ayla
2012 2013	İşler Güçler
2014	Ah Neriman
2015 2016	Eve Dönüş
2017	Klavye Delikanlilari
2019 2020	Vuslat
2020 2021	Çukur
