= Jack Cannon =

Jack Cannon may refer to:

- Nelson DeMille (1943–2024), American author who used the pseudonym Jack Cannon
- Jack Cannon (American football) (1907–1967), American football player
- Jack Cannon, protagonist of a popular children's book series written by a patient in the American medical drama House

== See also ==
- John Cannon (disambiguation)
