= Senator Cannon =

Senator Cannon may refer to:

== Members of the United States Senate ==
- Frank J. Cannon (1859–1933), U.S. Senator from Utah from 1896 to 1899
- Howard Cannon (1912–2002), U.S. Senator from Nevada from 1959 to 1983

== United States state senate members ==
- Edwin Bennion Cannon (1910–1963), Utah State Senate
- Franklin Cannon (1794–1863), Missouri State Senate
- George Mousley Cannon (1861–1937), Utah State Senate
- James E. Cannon (1873–1942), Virginia State Senate
- Martha Hughes Cannon (1857–1932), Utah State Senate
- Newton Cannon (1781–1841), Tennessee State Senate
