= Canaan, Kings County, Nova Scotia =

Community in Nova Scotia, Canada

Canaan in Nova Scotia

Canaan is a community in the Canadian province of Nova Scotia, located in Kings County. Canaan is home to the Third Horton (Canaan) Baptist Church, the Canaan community centre and the Annapolis Valley Shooting Sports Club.

On April 27, 1944, two World War II Hawker Hurricane aircraft based out of Greenwood, Nova Scotia, collided over Canaan killing both pilots.

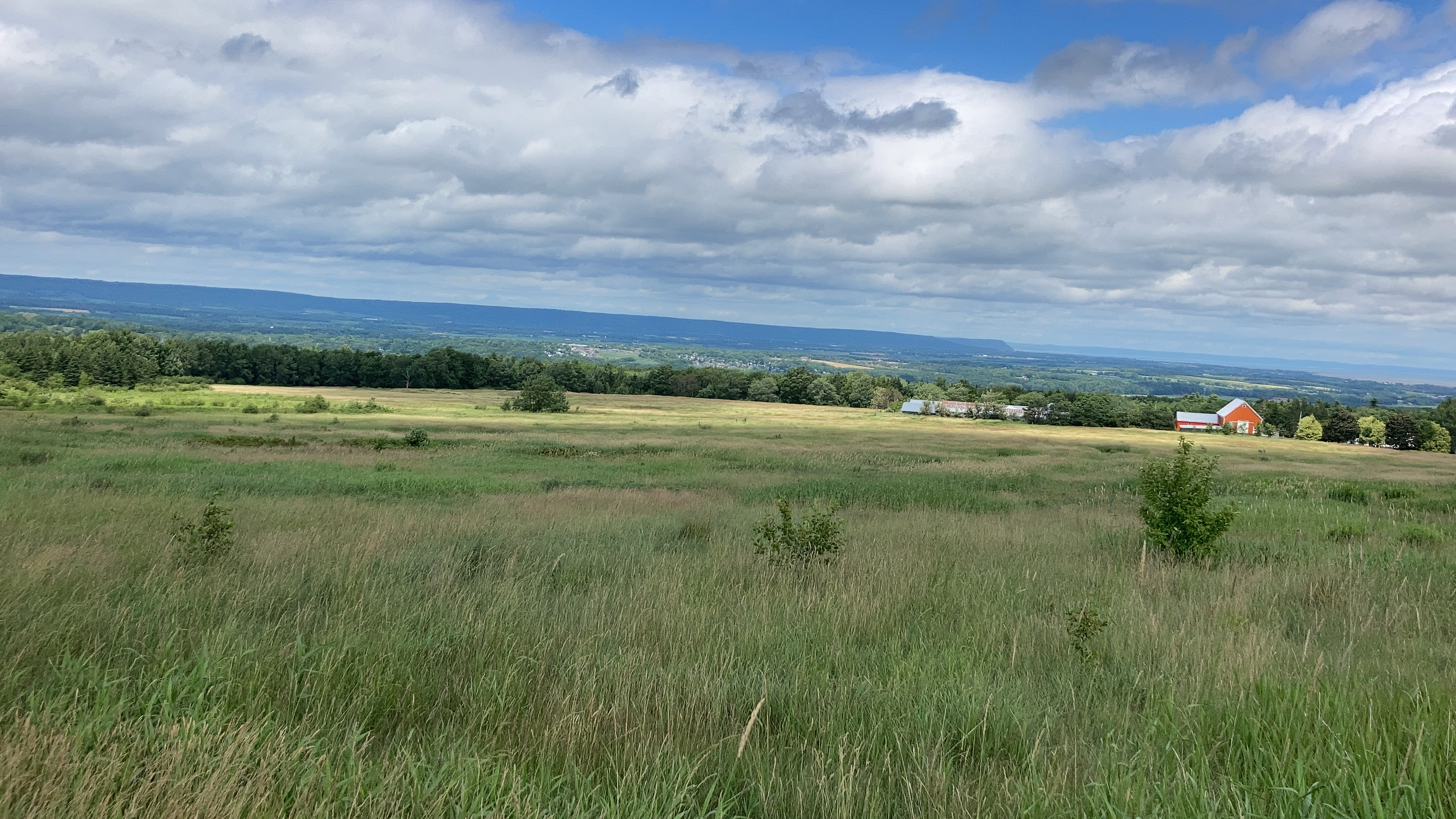
View from top of Canaan Mountain, July 2020

On July 2, 2016 Canaan hosted the first Canaan Country Music festival. The concert was headlined by Brett Kissel, George Canyon, Wes Mack, Jason Benoit and Jess Moskaluke.

On August 11, 2018, Canaan hosted a second festival renamed the Canaan Mountain Music Festival held over two days. The headline performers included the Canadian country rock band Blue Rodeo, Tim Hicks, River Town Saints, Jimmy Rankin and Tristan Horncastle.
