= Canan =

Canan or Janan is a Turkish female name from Persian origin, meaning beloved, it may refer to:

== Given name ==
- Aslı Canan Sabırlı (born 1991), Turkish women's footballer
- Canan Bayram (born 1966), German lawyer and politician
- Canan Dağdeviren (born 1985), Turkish materials scientist and academic
- Canan Ergüder (born 1977), Turkish actress
- Canan Kaftancıoğlu (born 1972), Turkish physician and politician
- Canan Karatay (born 1943), Turkish professor, medical doctor
- Canan Öztoprak (born 1955), Turkish Cypriot politician
- Canan Senol (born 1970), Turkish-Kurdish visual artist
- Canan Tolon (born 1955), Turkish artist

== Surname ==
- Janine Canan, American poet and editor
- Samuel Canan, 34th Governor of American Samoa

== See also ==
- Canan Station, Pennsylvania
- Cannan
- Canaan
- Canan (film)
