= Canan (TV series) =

Television series

- Genre: Drama
- Based on: Canan (1925) by Peyami Safa
- Story by: Hakan Haksun; Yelda Eroğlu; Mert Meriçli; Ayşe Bengi
- Directed by: Bahadır İnce
- Theme music composer: Cem Tuncer; Engin Arslan; Nail Yurtsever
- Country of origin: Turkey
- Original language: Turkish
- No. of episodes: 28

Production
- Producer: Ata Türkoğlu

Original release
- Release: March 2011

Canan (2011) is a Turkish television series, the chief executive officer of which is Bahadır İnce. The production of this series was supported financially by Koliba Film Yapım and Fox Broadcasting Company.

== Plot ==
The serial was inspired by Peyami Safa's novel Canan, published in 1925. The series broadly outlines the hard life of a woman overwhelmed by vicissitudes encountered in the past.

At an early age, Canan was taken forcibly from her mother's arms by Renknaz Karahan, a conceited and vain woman. Canan was adopted into the Karahan family in order to keep the company of Renknaz's heartsick daughter. During her time at the Karahan mansion, she went through repulsive events, such as the rape that was witnessed by her best friend Bedia. Bedia remained silent, never giving away the name of Canan's rapist. The rape left Canan pregnant and subsequently she was banished from the Karahan mansion by Renknaz. In order to preserve the family honor Renkaz made Canan marry a seedy man, Kazim, who abused Canan constantly. Kazim, her husband lied to her that her daughter was stillborn when in fact the little girl was left in an orphanage by Renknaz Karahan. After this Canan left her evil husband which forced her to live on the streets again. There She met Mahir, an amiable teenager, who helped her out for several months. But soon he got a job in France where he also managed to find a babysitting job for Canan.

Several years later Canan, now a very wealthy woman, returns set on revenge. Once Canan discovers that her daughter is alive things take an unexpected turn. Canan gives up her plans of revenge and makes every effort to find her daughter. She is determined to retrieve affection, friends and dignity lost in her obscure past. It turns out that Elif, Selim's adopted daughter is Canan's lost daughter. Selim was the great love of Canan's life and he was her boyfriend at the time of the rape. Canan tries to approach Elif but her efforts are stonewalled by Elif due to the lies told by Renkaz Karahan.

Karahan family is the subject of a series of misfortunes which are all being blamed on Canan. Blinded by vengeance and malice, Abdullah and Karahan spouses plan to get rid of Canan. But events take an inescapable turn, Canan being ravished by ruffians paid by Abdullah.

== Cast ==
=== Main characters ===
The protagonists are Canan (Gamze Özçelik Pektaş) and Selim (Erdinç Gülener), being present in all episodes. Harika Uygur drafted the casting for this TV series.

| Character | Actor |
|---|---|
| Ayşe Canan Bernard | Gamze Özçelik Pektaş, Özlem Conker |
| Selim Soyer | Erdinç Gülener |
| Abdullah | Şemsi İnkaya |
| Renknaz Karahan | Neriman Uğur |
| Şakir Karahan | Mehmet Atay |
| Lami | Evren Bingöl |
| Bedia | Deniz Bolışık |
| Şemsi | Fatih Sönmez |
| Perihan | Gözde Türkpençe |
| Orhan | Haldun Boysan |
| Ali | Bekir Çiçekdemir |
| Carla | Keiko Belir Altay |
| Elif Soyer | Büşra Ayaydin |
