= William Cannon (disambiguation) =

William Cannon (1809–1865), was an American politician.

William Cannon (or variants) may also refer to:

== Sports ==
- Bill Cannon (footballer) (born 1956), Australian rules footballer for St Kilda
- Billy Cannon (1937–2018), American football player
- Billy Cannon Jr. (born 1961), his son, American football player
- William Cannon (cricketer) (1871–1933), Australian cricketer
- Willie Cannon (American football), American arena football player (see: Denver Dynamite (arena football))
- William Cannon (dancer) from Dance Magazine's "25 to Watch"

== TV and film ==
- William Cannon (director) (1907–1990), American director
- William Cannon (actor), American actor in Days of Darkness (2007 American film)
- William Cannon (writer), TV show writer (Going Bananas)

== Others ==
- William Cannon (pioneer) (1755–1854), Oregon Country pioneer
- William Ragsdale Cannon (1916–1997), American bishop
- Will Cannon, Sr. and Will Cannon, Jr., architects, founders of CannonDesign

== See also ==
- Doran William Cannon (1937–2005), American screenwriter
- James William Cannon (1852–1921), American industrialist, founded the Cannon Mills Corporation
