= Uğur Pektaş =

Turkish actor (born 1979)

- Born: 16 April 1979 (age 47); Istanbul, Turkey
- Occupation: Actor
- Years active: 2005–present
- Spouse: Gamze Özçelik (m. 2008; div. 2012)
- Website: ugurpektas.com (in Turkish)

Uğur Pektaş (born 16 April 1979) is a Turkish actor.

He is known for his role in the television crime series Arka Sokaklar, which co-stars his ex-wife Gamze Özçelik. Arka Sokaklar is the longest-running Turkish series.

He portrayed Omar al-Mukhtar in the historical series Mahsusa: Trablusgarb.

Pektas played in the series Kuşdili. He played in the series Düşler ve Gerçekler with Gamze Özçelik.

He was a competitor in the reality-television series Survivor Turkey finals, winning the first degree in the program, which was shown on Star TV at the time.

== Personal life ==
Pektas's maternal family is of Albanian descent.

== Filmography ==
Television

- Survivor Turkey (2005; champion)
- Düşler ve Gerçekler (2005)
- Kuşdili (2006)
- Arka Sokaklar (2006–2009, 2010–2014, 2015–2016)
- Survivor Turkey (2020; withdrawn)
- Mahsusa: Trablusgarb (2023–2024)
- Kuruluş Orhan (2025-2026)

== See also ==
- List of Turkish actors
- List of people from Istanbul
