= Çelik Erişçi =

Turkish singer-songwriter (born 1966)

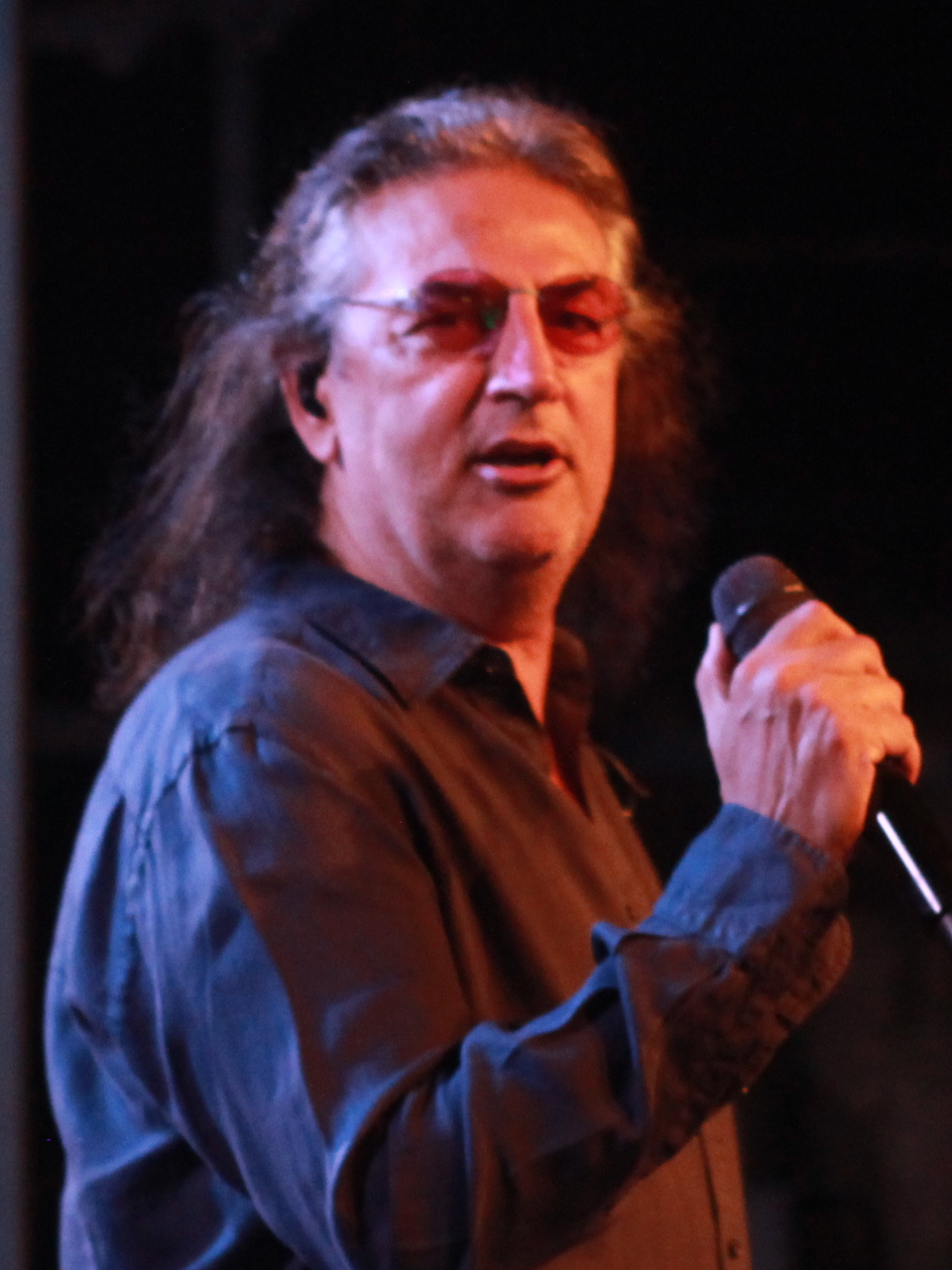
- Çelik in 2026

Background information
- Born: 12 May 1966 (age 60); Istanbul, Turkey
- Occupations: Singer-songwriter; composer
- Spouse: Buket Saygı (m. 2002–2005)
- Musical career
- Genres: Pop; adult contemporary; pop rock
- Years active: 1985–present
- Labels: Raks; Plaza; Universal; Artistanbul; Seyhan; Statü; Eflatun; Avrupa; DMC
- Website: celikerisci.com

Çelik Erişçi (born 12 May 1966), better known by his stage name Çelik, is a Turkish singer-songwriter. Since the early 1990s, with the successful sales of his albums, he has been a prominent figure of pop music, recognized in Turkey.

== Discography ==
=== Albums ===
- 1991: Özledim (İzel-Çelik-Ercan)
- 1994: Ateşteyim
- 1995: Benimle Kal
- 1996: Yaman Sevda
- 1997: Sevdan Gözümün Bebeği
- 1998: Sevgilerimle
- 1999: Onu Düşünürken
- 2000: Unutamam
- 2001: 8inci
- 2002: Yol
- 2003: Affet
- 2005: Gariban
- 2006: Kod Adı Aşk
- 2012: Milat
- 2023: İz Düşümü

=== Compilation Albums ===
- 2013: Selam Söyle
- 2013: Best of
- 2022: Hediye

=== EPs ===
- 2011: Kalp Gözü
- 2017: İyi Günde, Kötü Günde
- 2019: Üstü Açık Araba

=== Singles ===
- 2014: Cici Kız (with Dj Hakan Küfündür)
- 2015: Benimki de Kalp
- 2018: Tövbe Ettim
- 2019: Ara Ara
