= David Cannon =

David Cannon may refer to:

- David Cannon (athlete) (born 1950), English long-distance runner
- David Cannon (Idaho politician), member of the Idaho House of Representatives
- David Cannon (West Virginia politician), member of the West Virginia House of Delegates
- David J. Cannon (1933–2011), American attorney
- Whirlwind (comics), comic book villain with the real name David Cannon
