= Tristan Horncastle =

Canadian country music singer-songwriter (born 1986)

- Born: March 23, 1986 (age 39); Fredericton, New Brunswick, Canada
- Genres: Country
- Occupation: Singer-songwriter
- Years active: 2012–present
- Labels: Royalty
- Website: tristanhorncastle.ca

Tristan Horncastle (born March 23, 1986) is a Canadian country music singer-songwriter. Horncastle signed to Royalty Records in November 2013. His first single for the label, "A Little Bit of Alright", was released in January 2014. It peaked at number 34 on the Billboard Canada Country chart. Horncastle's debut album, A Little Bit of Alright, was released via Royalty on May 27, 2014 and distributed by Sony Music Canada.

== Discography ==
=== Extended plays ===
Title	Details
Good Kinda Crazy	Release date: September 2012; Label: self-released

=== Studio albums ===
Title	Details
A Little Bit of Alright	Release date: May 27, 2014; Label: Royalty Records
Turnin' Up a Sundown	Release date: February 2016; Label: Royalty Records

=== Singles ===
Year	Single	Peak positions	Album
Year	Single	CAN Country	Album
2013	"She Brings the Beer"	—	A Little Bit of Alright
2014	"A Little Bit of Alright"	34	A Little Bit of Alright
2014	"That Was Before"	—	A Little Bit of Alright
2014	"You Want"	—	A Little Bit of Alright
2015	"Recreation Land"	—	A Little Bit of Alright
2015	"Drinkin' Girl"	—	Turnin' Up a Sundown
2016	"On My Way Girl"	—	Turnin' Up a Sundown
2016	"Long as I'm Alive"	—	Turnin' Up a Sundown
"—" denotes releases that did not chart

=== Guest singles ===
Year	Single	Artist	Album
2015	"Whiskey Won't Fix Me"	Amy Metcalfe	TBD

=== Music videos ===
Year	Video	Director
2015	"Drinkin' Girl"	Rich Misener

== Awards and nominations ==
Year	Association	Category	Result
2015	Canadian Country Music Association	Rising Star	Nominated
2017	East Coast Music Awards	Country Recording of the Year – Turnin' Up A Sundown	Won
