= Voices of the Void =

Early-access video game

- Developer: MrDrNose a.k.a. EternityDev (Note: Voices of the Void's opening sequence lists "EternityDev" as an alternative name.)
- Engine: Unreal Engine
- Platform: Windows
- Release: 4 August 2022 (first version); 30 March 2026 (0.9.0, latest version)
- Genres: Horror; simulation
- Mode: Single-player

Voices of the Void (VotV) is a horror and simulation video game in which the player controls astronomer Dr. Kel, tasked with operating an isolated radio observatory in the fictional Dunkeltaler National Park in rural Switzerland to detect and record radio signals from outer space. As time passes, the player experiences progressively more unusual events, encountering extraterrestrials, robotic space probes, possessed mannequins and other paranormal phenomena.

Voices of the Void was released in early access for Windows in August 2022 on Itch.io by MrDrNose. Its latest version, 0.9.0, was released in March 2026.

== Gameplay ==
The main computer in Voices of the Void 0.9.0, where signals are detected, downloaded, listened to, and processed.

Gameplay is centered around the operation and maintenance of the radio array and machinery, using the main building's terminals to locate, record, and download various interstellar radio signals from interstellar objects such as stars, exoplanets, satellites, and sometimes alien ships or space probes.

While operating the observatory, the player must manage their hunger and sleep. Machinery may also break down, reducing the observatory's processing power and possibly requiring the player to perform physical repairs. When the player completes tasks, they are given points that serve as the game's currency for buying items like food, machinery upgrades, or decorations.

In the process, the player may experience unusual events, including deadly weather events and encounters with extraterrestrial life and supernatural anomalies that can harm the player, damage equipment, or crash the game in a scripted sequence.. The game contains references to demonology and paranormal phenomenon, referencing demons such as Stolas and Furfur, and contains an old area of a cult compound. Other entities include wisps and ghost deer that attack the player. Voices of the Void currently has over 45 days in story mode, with a multitude of unique events and over 200 unique signals, with some referencing other games, media, or paranormal phenomenon. Other events reference real life events, such as cardboard standees depicting Hopkinsville aliens or the McEwen Heart.

== Reception ==
In an August 2022 Dread Central article, Jesse Grodman commended Voices of the Void's story, gameplay, and detail, but also said that the game "went on a little too long".

In October 2022, Alice O'Connor of Rock Paper Shotgun also praised the game for its suspense and unconventionality, and said that, while some of its aspects are objectionable, "it's not worth quibbling too much at this stage of development. I am excited to see what this game will become".
