= Michael R. Cannon =

American technology business executive

Michael R. Cannon (born 1953) is the former CEO of Solectron. He currently serves as the chairman of Seagate's board of directors since July 2020.

Prior to joining Solectron, Cannon was president, CEO and director of Maxtor Corporation. Previously, Cannon was with IBM's Storage Systems Division, where he held several senior leadership positions, including vice president of the Personal Storage Systems Division, vice president of product design and vice president of worldwide operations. Prior to IBM, Cannon worked at several companies in the disk drive industry, including Control Data Corporation's Imprimis Technology spin-off. Cannon began his career at The Boeing Company, where he held engineering and management positions in the Manufacturing Research and Development Group. Cannon studied mechanical engineering at Michigan State University and attended the six-week Advanced Management Program at Harvard Business School.
