= John Cannon =

John Cannon may refer to:

- John Cannon (American football) (born 1960), former member of the Tampa Bay Buccaneers
- John Cannon (historian) (1926–2012), British historian
- John Cannon (politician) (died 1833), Canadian builder and politician
- John Cannon (racing driver) (1933–1999), Canadian auto racer
- John Cannon (rugby union) (1980–2016), Canadian rugby union player
- John Cannon (weightlifter), Scottish weightlifter
- John K. Cannon (1892–1955), U.S. Air Force general
- John Q. Cannon (1857–1931), American newspaper editor and general authority of The Church of Jesus Christ of Latter-day Saints
- Ace Cannon (John Cannon, 1934–2018), American saxophonist

== See also ==
- Jack Cannon (disambiguation)
- John Canon (died 1798), founder and namesake of Canonsburg, Pennsylvania
- John Cannan
