= Judge Cannon =

Judge Cannon may refer to:

- Aileen Cannon (born 1981), judge of the United States District Court for the Southern District of Florida
- Robert C. Cannon (1917–2008), judge of the Wisconsin Court of Appeals

== See also ==
- Lawrence Arthur Dumoulin Cannon (1877–1939), justice of the Supreme Court of Canada
