= Canaan Township =

Canaan Township may refer to the following townships in the United States:

- Canaan Township, Henry County, Iowa
- Canaan Township, Gasconade County, Missouri (inactive)
- Canaan Township, Athens County, Ohio
- Canaan Township, Madison County, Ohio
- Canaan Township, Morrow County, Ohio
- Canaan Township, Wayne County, Ohio
- Canaan Township, Wayne County, Pennsylvania

== See also ==
- South Canaan Township, Wayne County, Pennsylvania
