= Steve Cannon =

Steve Cannon may refer to:

- Steve Cannon (radio) (1927–2009), Minnesota radio personality on WCCO-AM
- Steve Cannon (writer) (1935–2019), novelist, playwright, poet and professor from the City University of New York
- Steve Staley, American voice actor whose stage name is Steve Cannon
