= Arka Sokaklar =

Turkish crime drama television series

- Also known as: Back Streets
- Genre: Detective; Action; Comedy-drama
- Developed by: Erler Film (2006–2022); D Media (2023–2026)
- Written by: Ahmet Yurdakul; Ozan Yurdakul; Sinan Yurdakul; Metin Arslan
- Directed by: Orhan Oğuz (2006–2024); Baran Özçaylan (2024–2026)
- Starring: Zafer Ergin; Şevket Çoruh; Özgür Ozan; Ozan Çobanoğlu; Alp Korkmaz; Ebru Cündübeyoğlu; Sarp Levendoğlu; Felicia Sağnak
- Theme music composer: Murat Evgin
- Ending theme: Bambaşka Bir Şehir (A Different City)
- Country of origin: Turkey
- Original language: Turkish
- No. of seasons: 20
- No. of episodes: 751

Production
- Producers: Türker İnanoğlu (2006–2022); Ali Cengiz Deveci (2023–2026)
- Production location: Istanbul
- Running time: 135 minutes

Original release
- Network: Kanal D
- Release: 31 July 2006 – 5 June 2026

Arka Sokaklar (English: Back Streets) was a television crime series that was broadcast on Kanal D on 31 July 2006. In its 20 consecutive seasons the series has become a success story with its TV ratings despite being criticized for continuity/logic errors, near superhero abilities of main characters, overused lines of dialogue, and excessive use of zoom.

In the series, the family lives of the police officers working in a special team in the Public Security Branch of the Istanbul Police Department and the adventures on the streets of Istanbul are told. The team encounters different and varied human stories during their missions. Istanbul Police Chief Rıza Soylu (Zafer Ergin), who approaches these stories with the experience and fatherhood of his professional years, and also guides the other young members of the team.

== Characters ==
Actor	Character	Episodes	Notes
Zafer Ergin	Rıza Soylu	1–751	He head of the team. Chief of police (4th Degree) of the Istanbul Police Department, Public Order Section. A well-experienced and successful cop. He is the chief of his team and is also called Rıza Baba (Father Rıza) by his teammates. He died as a result of the bomb attack.
Özgür Ozan	Hüsnü Çoban	1–751	Chief Inspector. Joined the team as an Inspector. A very successful cop who often gets awards from the Police Department. He has a large family containing a wife, 5 children and also his wife's aunt. Despite the hard life in Istanbul and the troubles his wife or sons cause him, he never gives up the life. He is one of the primal members of the team alongside Rıza, Mesut and Murat. He got promoted to Chief Inspector of the team in the 398th episode. He died as a result of the bomb attack.
Şevket Çoruh	Mesut Güneri	1–632, 672–751	Inspector. He served in the Special Forces as a bomb expert against the terror on the East and returned to Istanbul with the mental trauma due to the side effects of his mission. Although he's tough in his career and private life, he's quite friendly and somewhat sarcastic among the family, or the team. He has a son named Tunç whom he raised, and still raising all by himself. Like Hüsnü, he's one of the oldest members of the team. He had a brain hemorrhage and went to America for treatment. He come back in the 672th episode. He died as a result of the bomb attack.
Uğur Pektaş	Murat Ateş	1–125, 173–336, 377–385	Inspector. A successful cop. He was married with Inspector Zeynep Akyüz. They have children named Ömer. He then left the team a few times and then returned. He's both ambitious and hard-working at his job. Although he looks quite, he can be troublesome if he loses his temper. After the death of his wife from the gunfight, he closes his heart to the love But later In 9th season he was married with Inspector Leyla and they moved to Izmir. Then he came back to the team but He left the team shortly after due to his appointment to Antalya.
Gamze Özçelik	Zeynep Akyüz Ateş	1–126, 210–292	Inspector. A young cop. Her father was a narc cop. She was the wife of the Inspector Murat Ateş. They have children named Ömer. She then left the team a few times and then returned. She was shot by the ear during a gunfight and later died due to cerebral hemorrhage.
Alp Korkmaz	Ali Akdoğan	1–594 600,718–751	Inspector. A young cop. He is married to Rıza's daughter. Due to being the youngest member of the team, his teammates often have fun with him and call him 'Tulip'. He serves in the team as a sniper. It is known that he died by everyone as a result of the bomb attack during his duty in Antalya, but he is alive. He was kidnapped by terrorists and lost his sanity. He died as a result of the bomb attack.
Özlem Çınar	Aylin Aydın	1–521, 639–710	Inspector. Hakan's ex-wife. She was serving in the team as the monitor and technician. She was martyred as a result of being shot by a sniper.
İlker İnanoğlu	Engin Balkan	44–172, 210–214, 358–376, 493–679, 700	Chief of police(2th degree). He served as the chief of security at the Turkish Consulates of Washington DC and Madrid. He first joined the team as chief commissioner in the 2nd season. He then left the team a few times and then returned. He is head of the team after Rıza Baba. His wife is Lawyer Başak. He formed a new team with Kadir, Seval and Mehmet for a special mission and due to left the team. He came to Istanbul to support Mesut after Tunç was seriously injured in the 700th episode. Then he went back.
Çağla Kubat	Elif Doğan Bahadır	126–209	Inspector. Her father is a retired superintendent in the Istanbul Police Department. She was engaged with Inspector Sinan Bahadır. At the day of her wedding, she was attacked by a criminal who stabbed the knife into her stomach and later died in the hospital due to heavy bloodloss.
Berk Oktay	Sinan Bahadır	126–250	Inspector. He has similar characteristics with Murat and they become good friends sometime after his return. After Elif was killed during the day of their wedding, he almost gave up everything but was convinced to rejoin the team. He was later appointed to the Diyarbakır Narcotics Department.
Zeynep Beşerler	Melek Serter	168–293	Deputy Inspector. She formerly worked as a narc. She had married once and later divorced. She has a daughter named Şirin. Initially, she was disliked by Mesut but the two later became good friends. She has feelings towards Mesut. She left the team due to her appointment to Bursa.
Gülcan Arslan	Leyla Candaş	294–336	Inspector. She used to be an inspector at the homicide desk. She's expert at crime scene investigation. In 9th season she was married with Inspector Murat and they moved to Izmir.
Gizem Soysaldı	Muazzez "Muzo" Kaplan	294–336	Inspector. She's a bomb expert. She left the team due to her appointment.
Can Başak	Arif Sağlam	294–521, 574–576, 639–680	He was included in the series as the Chief of Police in the 294th episode, which was the beginning of the 8th season. He is also the uncle of Commissioner Bahar. He retired.
Tunç Oğuz	Arda Atik	294–433, 445–680	Deputy Inspector. He and Volkan are good friends. In episode 433, he was called to France for an education and went. He returned to the team in episode 445. After Ali was martyred in the 600th episode, after the 601st episode, he occasionally takes the duty of sniper like Ali in the operations. He left the team due to his appointment to Bursa.
Buse Varol	Yasemin Güçlü	294–376	Deputy Inspector. She left the team due to her appointment.
Beril Kayar	Deniz Gençoğlu	337–376	Deputy Inspector. With his success in an operation, Rıza Baba took him to her team. She had a love with Engin for a while and she left the team due to her appointment.
Can Nergis	Onur Yalçın	337–376	Deputy Inspector. He grew up in an orphanage. Before joining the team, he was working in the Narcotics branch. Later, he joined Rıza Baba's team. Afterwards, he was suspended because he had something to do with his brother Baran as a result of an operation. But then, when the original event emerges, it returns to the team again. He has a relationship with the Ece and leaves the team when this relationship ends badly.
Müge Boz	Ece Dündar	337–376	Inspector. She was called to the team by Rıza Baba, and he accepted this offer. She has established good relations with the team over time. She has a relationship with the Onur. She left the team due to her appointment.
Oya Okar	Selin Demirci Güneri	377–638, 674–751	Inspector. She joined the series in season 10. Mesut's wife. For a while she went to America to Mesut. She come back in the 674th episode. She died as a result of the bomb attack.
Boğaç Aksoy	Volkan Acar	377–521	Deputy Inspector. He and Arda are good friends. He is in love with Hande and he was shot and killed in the clash with the drug gang.
Ozan Çobanoğlu	Hakan Çınar	389–751	Inspector. He is an experienced commissioner who previously worked at terror Branch. Rıza Baba thought that he was a successful policeman and took him to his team. After coming to the team, he married Aylin. Aylin's ex-husband. He died as a result of the bomb attack.
Beste Seyhan Şamcı	Eda Bulut	400–521	Deputy Inspector. She is assisting Aylin in monitoring. She left the team due to her appointment.
Başak Atıcı	Hande	400–521	Constable. Her colleagues are sometimes making fun of her, because her lack of experience. She is in love with Volkan. She left the team in episode 521 due to Volkan's death.
Merve Oflaz	Bahar Ayan	449–594	Deputy Inspector. Arif's nephew. She joined the team and the series in season 12. She had a very short relationship with Hakan. The fire that broke out in Gazi Cafe affected Bahar badly, and Bahar could not handle what happened and asked for an appointment.
Yiğitcan Ergin	Cemal Şahin	522–632	Deputy Inspector. He is in love with Ezgi. He left the team due to his appointment.
Ela Yörüklü	Ezgi Vural	523–632	Deputy Inspector. She is in love with Cemal. She left the team due to her appointment.
Gizem Terzi	Sinem	557–650	She is a computer specialist. She died as a result of a bomb explosion in the car she was riding.
Oğuz Peçe	Emre Gürbüz	595–680	Deputy Inspector. In the 16th season, Emre fell in love with Aslı. In the 17th season, Emre fell in love with Nurcan. In the 18th season, Emre fell in love with Cansu. He left the team because he went to duty abroad.
Deniz Çatalbaş	Aslı Atalay	595–632	She joined the team in season 16. She previously worked in Narcotics. She is in love with Emre and she left the team due to her appointment.
Ali Haydar Çataltepe	Alper	628–650	Deputy Inspector. He died as a result of a bomb explosion in the car he was riding.
Cansın Çekili	Ayşe Arıcan	633–638	Inspector. She transferred from the Netherlands to Rıza Baba's team and served at Interpol. She did not return to the team after going to the earthquake area for help.
Batuhan Ekşi	Yavuz Aslan	633–638	Inspector. He is an experienced commissioner who previously worked at Narcotics Branch. He did not return to the team after going to the earthquake area for help.
Sebahat Kumaş	Nurcan Gök	633–638	Deputy Inspector. She did not return to the team after going to the earthquake area for help.
Yılmaz Tüzün	Kadri Keser	637–638	He is the chief commissioner and he is an experienced person. At the request of Rıza Baba joined the team for a while. He left after staying in the team for a short time.
Hasan Denizyaran	Kadir Korkmaz	639–677	Inspector. He knew his brother's death from the team and had hostility to the team. Later, He starts to agree with Rıza Baba and they get better. He joined the newly established team of Engin and left Rıza Baba's team.
Cansu Fırıncı	Ünal Kalafat	639–670	He is the former supervisor of the InspectorKadir . When the team disbanded, Ünal replaced Rıza Baba and his team with his own team. He was arrested for working with the team's enemies. He later regretted it and now works with the team. It provides Intelligence to the team. He left the team due to his appointment to Sinop.
Sinem Reyhan Kıroğlu	Birce Yaman	639–663	Deputy Inspector. She worked in Izmir before. Rıza Baba and his team meet while working in the Narcotics Branch. When he hears about the achievements of Rıza Baba and his team, she joins them. She also worked in intelligence with Aylin before. She asks for his appointment to Hatay and stays there.
Gizem Birdan	Arzu	639–680	A computer specialist is a policeman. She left the team in episode 680.
Ece Aydemir	Cansu Toprak	640–680	Crime scene expert. She is in love with Emre. She left the team because she went to duty abroad.
Pamir Pekin	Mehmet Bozok	653–677	Inspector. He has been meeting Rıza Baba and Mesut for a long time. Rıza Baba called him to the team. Later he joined the newly established team of Engin and left Rıza Baba's team.
Burcu Kara	Seval Aslan	655–677	Inspector. Rıza Baba called her to the team. Later she joined the newly established team of Engin and left Rıza Baba's team.
Burak Satıbol	Zeki Çevik	672–751	Inspector. They encounter Hüsnü during an operation. Hüsnü considers himself suitable for the team and tells Rıza Baba and is taken to the team. He died as a result of the bomb attack.
Ebru Cündübeyoğlu	Candan Ceylanlı	681–751	Chief of Police and new member of the team. She previously served in Antalya. Since Rıza Baba was in prison and Engin left the team, she became the head of the team for a short time. Later, when Rıza Baba was released from prison, She joined the team and replaced Engin. She died as a result of the bomb attack.
Felicia Sağnak	Merve Yalçın	681–751	Police officer.
Tolga Kandemir	Melih Demircan	681–751	Police officer.
Aslı Şimşek	Edanur Kocakaya	681–727	Police officer. She was martyred while on duty.
Orhan Alp	İzzet Yıldırım	681–751	Police officer.
Burak Alkaş	Fikri Yeniceli	685–706	Inspector. He is a previously worked in the Narcotics Branch. He met the team while on a secret mission. Later, joined the team at the request of the Candan and Rıza Baba. He left the team due to his appointment to Antalya.
Yasemin Allen	Gökçe Kurt	711–717	Inspector. She is a previously worked in the Anti-Smuggling and Organized Crime Unit. She left the team at her own request.
Sarp Levendoğlu	Barış Bozoğlu	718–751	Inspector. He participated in a joint operation with the team. Then he was transferred to the team. He died as a result of the bomb attack.
Burak Apak	Ufuk Akgöl	718-751	Police officer.
Damla Aslanalp	Sude	718-751	She is Barış's ex-wife. She is a former inspector. She was suspended from the police office for using drugs. Then it will be treated and heals. She works with the Narcotics Branch.
Derin Su Tekemen	Dilek	738-748	Police officer.
Figen Evren	Suat Çoban	1–447	Hüsnü's wife. She is loyal to her husband but she often gets him into trouble unintentionally. On the day of her son Metin's wedding she was attacked by car, which was being used by an escaping criminal, and died.
Onur Bay	Tekin Çoban	1–594	Hüsnü's younger son and 3rd child of the family. He and his brother often cause troubles for their father. He is mainly responsible. He is also a perversive womanizer even attempting to flirt with females who are way older than him including his elder sister's friends. He is trying to become a famous actor in a theatre. He went to Germany.
Furkan Göksel	Metin Çoban	1–522, 595–751	Hüsnü's elder son and 2 child of the family. He and his brother often cause troubles for their father. His brother is mainly responsible. He has a better behaviour than his brother. Now working in a restaurant.
Yüsra Geyik	Zeliha Çoban	1–594	Hüsnü's elder daughter and the eldest child of the family. After university, she is now working as a journalist. Often quarrels with her brothers. She went to Germany.
Kerimhan Duman	Tunç Güneri	1–751	Mesut's son and best friends with Hüsnü's sons. He lost his mother at a young age. Unlike Hüsnü's sons, he is calm well-behaved and also very intelligent. He has a very good relationship with his father. He's also quite hard-working and very successful at his school.
İlker Yiğen	Yavuz Ateş	1–336, 399–401	Doctor. Murat's younger brother.
Nazlı Tosunoğlu	Nazike	126–751	Suat's aunt. Hüsnü strongly dislikes her.
Filiz Taçbaş (1–250) Hülya Kalebayır (251–751)	Ayla	1–667, 680–751	Rıza is Baba's wife.
Pınar Aydın (1–86) Sitare Bilge (87–125) İpek Yaylacıoğlu (126–521) Elvan Dişli (522–667,698,720–751 )	Pınar	1–667,698,720–751	Rıza Baba's daughter. Teacher. First, she was in love with Murat. Then they married Ali. They have 2 children. After Ali's death, they became a in love and engaged to Doctor Yağız in episode 645. She married yağız in episode 666. Then she returned to Istanbul.
Perihan Ünlücan	Başak Balkan	557–661	She is a lawyer who is Engin's wife. She was killed by the team's enemies.
Gaye Gürsel	Esra	565–751	She is Hüsnü's wife after Suat. They met Hüsnü as a result of a minor accident in the 565th episode.
Balemir Emren	Yağız	645–667,725-743	The Doctor and Pınar's husband. He married Pınar in episode 666. When they find a very well-paid job in Ankara, they went Ankara with Pınar. Then he returned to Istanbul. He was killed by a criminal gang in episode 743.

=== Changed Characters ===
Actor	Birthday	Character	Role number	Role order	Notes	Episodes	Total episode	Seasons	Total season	Years	Total year
Pınar Aydın	16 July 1981	Pınar Soylu	ONE	FIRST	Rıza's daughter and Ali's wife. She is rather snobbish and quick-tempered. She sometimes criticizes Ali but loves him very much.	1–86	86	1–2	2	2006–2007	2
Sitare Bilge	28 November 1983	Pınar Soylu	TWO	SECOND	Rıza's daughter and Ali's wife. She is rather snobbish and quick-tempered. She sometimes criticizes Ali but loves him very much.	87–125	39	3	1	2008	1
İpek Yaylacıoğlu	31 July 1984	Pınar Soylu	THREE	THIRD	Rıza's daughter and Ali's wife. She is rather snobbish and quick-tempered. She sometimes criticizes Ali but loves him very much.	126–521	396	4–13	10	2009–2018	10
Elvan Dişli	2 May 1987	Pınar Soylu	FOUR	FOURTH	Rıza's daughter and Ali's wife. She is rather snobbish and quick-tempered. She sometimes criticizes Ali but loves him very much.	522–638	117	14–17	4	2019–2022	4
Özge Özbütün	16 December 2000	Şule Çoban	ONE	FIRST	Hüsnü's younger daughter and the 4th child of the family.	1–209	209	1–5	5	2006–2010	5
Manolya Aşık	23 March 2000	Şule Çoban	TWO	SECOND	Hüsnü's younger daughter and the 4th child of the family.	210–521	312	6–13	8	2011–2018	8
Ecem Öz	18 April 2004	Şule Çoban	THREE	THIRD	Hüsnü's younger daughter and the 4th child of the family.	522–638	117	14–17	4	2019–2022	4
Filiz Taçbaş	1964	Ayla Soylu	ONE	FIRST	Rıza's wife, Pınar's mother and Efe & Zeynep's (Zeyno) grandmother.	1–250	250	1–6	6	2006–2011	6
Hülya Kalebayır	23 February 1969	Ayla Soylu	TWO	SECOND	Rıza's wife, Pınar's mother and Efe & Zeynep's (Zeyno) grandmother.	251–638	388	7–17	11	2012–2022	11

== International broadcasters ==
Country	Local name	Network	Premiere date
Northern Cyprus	Arka Sokaklar	Kanal D	31 July 2006
Bulgaria	Опасни улици	bTV	24 March 2011
Iraq	كۆڵانه‌كانى پشته‌وه‌	NRT2	2 August 2015

== See also ==
- Television in Turkey
- List of Turkish television series
- Turkish television drama
