= Abiotic Factor =

2025 survival video game

- Developer: Deep Field Games
- Publisher: Playstack
- Producer: Henry Feltham
- Designer: Geoff "Zag" Keene
- Programmer: Jacob "Abiscuits" Kemp
- Artist: Connor "MadDok" Moran
- Writer: Henry Feltham
- Engine: Unreal Engine
- Platforms: PlayStation 5; Windows; Xbox Series X/S
- Release: 22 July 2025
- Genre: Survival
- Modes: Single-player, multiplayer

Abiotic Factor is a 2025 survival game developed by New Zealand-based independent studio Deep Field Games and published by Playstack. Set in 1993, players assume the role of scientists stranded in a vast underground research facility in the Australian outback. Players must salvage furniture, collect office supplies, craft tools, build fortifications, defend against paranormal containment breaches, and travel through interdimensional portals in an effort to escape to the surface.

Development began in early 2022 and was conducted remotely by a team of around ten developers. Its co-op gameplay was influenced by titles such as Valheim and Sea of Thieves, while its art direction and setting drew inspiration from Valve's Half-Life series. Abiotic Factor was released for Windows, PlayStation 5, and Xbox Series X/S on 22 July 2025, following an early access release in May 2024. During its stage in early access, the game has received three major updates: "Crush Depth" on 12 August 2024, "Dark Energy" on 4 February 2025, and, along with its full release on 22 July 2025, "Cold Fusion".

Abiotic Factor received critical praise for its genre-blending design, narrative, and multiplayer integration. The game received an overwhelmingly positive reception on Steam and was nominated for "Best Multiplayer Game" at the 2024 Golden Joystick Awards.

== Gameplay ==
Abiotic Factor is a survival game played in a first-person perspective. As scientists trapped in an underground research complex called the GATE Cascade Research Facility in the year 1993, players must craft tools and weapons, fight various alien creatures, and build their own home bases, alone or online with up to five additional players. The game's low-resolution stylised three-dimensional graphics and sense of humour are inspired by Half-Life.

Players create their own character and assign them one of various science-inspired specialisations which determine their attributes and may add permanent buffs or debuffs. The game features a role-playing games-style experience system and a skill tree, allowing players to upgrade their characters after the initial character creation.

While exploring and progressing through the GATE complex, players need to manage their personal needs—such as hunger, thirst, continence, and fatigue—as well as their protection from environmental factors like temperature and radiation. A day-night cycle determines the players' access to power; at night, all lights in the research facility are turned off and interdimensional portals may appear around player bases, allowing enemies to attack them. To defend against these raids and various alien creatures, as well as robotic and human threats roaming the facility, players need to disassemble furniture and collect items in order to craft improvised weapons and gear.

Abiotic Factor's linear story leads players through several sectors of the underground complex, which can be unlocked by crafting specialised tech, and through multiple alternate dimensions (called "Anteverses") accessible via portals. These portal worlds range in style and function and offer unique resources. Unlike the main building, they also reset twice a week. Players are thus encouraged to repeatedly visit and gather crafting materials from these worlds. The game's plot is conveyed through audio logs and emails found on numerous terminals throughout the facility; voiced non-player characters (NPCs) provide additional exposition and guidance for progressing the story. It takes about 50 to 60 hours to complete the game.

== Synopsis ==
=== Setting ===
Abiotic Factor takes place in 1993 within the GATE Cascade Research Facility, a vast underground research facility run by Garrick Advanced Technology Enterprises (GATE). Built to contain and study anomalous objects and entities, the facility houses a wide array of researchers across laboratories, power reactors, residences, and manufacturing sectors. Following the invention and successful testing of the "Dark Lens" in 1988—which enabled both temporal and spatial travel—the facility shifted its focus to studying "perforations" and the flora and fauna of the so-called "Anteverses". These rifts allow instantaneous travel across Earth, to distant exoplanets, into the past or the future, and even to parallel universes.

Several factions operate within or against GATE during the events of Abiotic Factor. The Gatekeepers, a branch of GATE's internal security force, who were originally tasked with protecting researchers and containing anomalous entities. While most continue to obey orders from Keystone, the executives of GATE, a Gatekeeper squad known as "The Unlost" emerged, convinced that resisting the flow of fate is meaningless and that humanity's role is predetermined. "The Order" is a rival organization with origins in an ancient scholarly sect dedicated to the study and suppression of anomalous phenomena. By the late 20th century, it had transformed into a secretive paramilitary group, clashing with GATE and attempting to shut down and seize control of perforation technology to safeguard it from humanity. A recurring threat from the Anteverses is the Exor, an alien species designed to colonise universes on behalf of an unknown higher intelligence which also created the "Wayseeker" to aid in this purpose.

=== Plot ===
Abiotic Factor opens in the Western Australian outback, where the player begins their first day as a scientist at the GATE Cascade Facility. Beneath a remote mining shack lies a sprawling underground facility built into a former lithium mine. After a brief orientation, an emergency diverts the player into the Office Sector, where a sudden rift causes the death of researcher Dr. Jager. Survivors explain that GATE has long studied "perforations", portals to parallel worlds known as Anteverses, and that an opposing paramilitary faction called the Order has infiltrated the complex. Attempting escape, the player is drawn into Flathill, a fog-shrouded research site in South Dakota accessible through Silo 3, where they learn the consequences of GATE's first perforation experiment. They regroup with survivors Abe and Janet, whose plan to flee to the surface through Manufacturing fails, forcing cooperation with Dr. Frake, who overloads a synchrotron to breach into Cascade Laboratories. Along the way, the player discovers GATE's history: the Dark Lens, built in 1988, easily opened perforations and initiated decades of research into alien ecosystems and entities. In the Laboratories the player encounters Dr. Cahn, once presumed dead but later revealed to be a shapeshifting anomaly and immurement subject (IS) called IS-0012. Cahn aids in reaching the main elevator in the Defense Sector, though it malfunctions, leaving the only escape route through the hydroplant.

The hydroplant helps powers the entire complex but has been partially seized by the Order. Abe and Janet are stranded there after their planned submarine escape fails. The player once again meets Dr. Elanor Newman, creator of the Dark Lens, who explains that the only remaining portal equipment lies within the nearby Reactors, accessible through a blocked spillway. To clear the path the player, recovers materials from both the hydroplant and a Swiss facility called Voussoir, accessible via a perforation. Along the way the player assists Kylie Muir, a cancer patient whose mind was transferred into a neural device.

The power services area above the Reactors is overrun by alien flora. Guided by K18, a reprogrammed security robot otherwise known as Waterbot, the player enters a perforation to recover antifungal chemicals. Inside, they encounter signs of an intelligent Exor society and briefly glimpse the "Wayseeker", a higher entity linked to their spread. Returning, they clear the infestation and enter the Reactors, where Dr. Cahn explains that four reactors must be reactivated to restore portal systems shut down by the Gatekeepers. As the player fights Order troops, Exor, and hostile Gatekeepers, a Gatekeeper squad called the "Unlost" offers cryptic reflections, suggesting the journey is guided by fate. With the reactors restored, a portal opens to a GATE facility located in Finland, which contains especially dangerous anomalies including the Wayseeker. Urged by Cahn, the player banishes the entity and briefly passes through the Order's headquarters, uncovering its origins as an ancient religious sect that has long suppressed anomalous knowledge. They discover the "Sun Disk", an alien reply to the Voyager Golden Records, which had been intercepted by the Order.

Empowered by the Sun Disk, the player enters the Residence Sector, frozen solid after a portal opened above linked to a frozen world. Amid glacial ruins and frozen survivors, the player discovers the Dark Lens suspended in a vast void where the Gatekeepers prepare their escape and learn that Dr. Cahn attempted to redirect the player to him for the rest of their induction to the Cascade facility. Passing through portals, the player glimpses an alternate future of GATE, an apocalyptic wasteland and a technologically advanced timeline. The path leads to a polar island near South Georgia, where the player confronts the Wayseeker. After its defeat, the entity summons a massive perforation, releasing the energy of thousands of Anteverses onto Earth. After the finale, Dr. Cahn reveals himself as a servant of an unknown master.

== Development ==
An 'exor' fires radioactive projectiles at a scientist fighting another monster from a containment breach. Moodlets on the left side of the screen indicate status effects.

Abiotic Factor was developed entirely remotely by a team of around ten. Managing time zone differences posed a challenge for the New Zealand-based studio, but this approach also enabled collaboration with creative talent from around the world.

At the 2024 New Zealand Game Developers Conference (NZGDC), Narrative Designer Henry Feltham recounted the origin story of Abiotic Factor. In 2020, when Feltham worked on a game for RocketWerkz, he met Geoff "Zag" Keene—who worked on the social deduction game Unfortunate Spacemen at the time—and Kate Colvin. Feltham later joined Keene and Colvin at Deep Field Games in early 2022.

Deep Field Games decided to develop a "vibey" game with a heavy focus on co-op play, stating that multiplayer titles like Valheim, Sea of Thieves, and Hell Let Loose had kept them "sane" throughout the COVID-19 pandemic. Abiotic Factor was one of a handful of game ideas prototyped for this purpose. The team sought to infuse the survival game genre with elements from both cozy and horror games that they personally enjoyed playing and combine them with a retro aesthetic.

Before development began, Abiotic Factor received funding from Alt Ventures' "Kiwi gaming fund". In June 2022, the New Zealand government-backed Centre of Digital Excellence (Code) provided Deep Field Games with a NZ$150,000 grant and covered the team's expenses to attend PAX Australia in October 2022, where an early demo was on show and playable. Aware of the game's resemblance to the Half-Life series, the team pitched their game to attendees as follows:

It's scientists in an underground lab. You make crazy shit to escape to the surface. But you're scientists. You're not Gordon Freeman, Doom Guy, Master Chief. [...] You're smart; but you're not strong.

— Henry Feltham, at NZGDC 2024

By the end of 2022, due to their appearance at PAX Australia, Deep Field Games had received some publishing offers. They ultimately decided to team up with Playstack, who also ended up publishing Balatro. On 23 August 2023, Abiotic Factor was a featured game at the "Future Games Show" at Gamescom 2023.

One of the challenges for the team was reversing the "power fantasy" trope common in many video games by slowing down progress and providing solutions to early game challenges that prioritise brain over brawn. The concept of "Anteverses", alternate dimensions that serve as dungeons, was incorporated early in development, giving the team freedom in the range of worlds they could create.

Abiotic Factor's director Geoff "Zag" Keene cites Half-Life and its second expansion Half-Life: Blue Shift as core inspirations for their game. The game features many elements adapted from the Half-Life series, such as trams, vending machines and lab coats. The game's setting, the GATE research facility, is built to structurally resemble Half-Life's Black Mesa Research Facility. The crafting system, which required players to drag materials into slots to find a valid combination and unlock an item, is loosely based on the puzzle game Wordle.

Keene criticised the survival genre's "grindy" nature in an interview with PC Gamer. As a result, one goal during the development of Abiotic Factor was to create a slower, less punitive style of gameplay that focused on exploration, adventure, and role-playing. Keene said the team was inspired by The Indie Stone's Project Zomboid and its "Moodle" system, which reduces reliance on meters, instead using voice lines and HUD pop-ups. In the same interview, he also noted that immersive sims had an unintended influence on the game. In an interview with Edge, Keene elaborated on the fragile nature of survival games and how the team distinguished Abiotic Factor from the genre. He stated, "[Survival games] release and get 100 reviews on Steam, if they’re lucky, and then they just fall off the map. [...] You’ve got to do something different with it."

== Release ==
The game entered a brief playtest period from 12 December 2023 to 1 January 2024 before being released into early access on Steam on 2 May 2024. During early access, Abiotic Factor functioned like an episodic video game, with its story and content being amended through the addition of three major "chapters", each of which added about two more sectors to the game's world. The game launched fully on 22 July 2025.

=== Early access ===
While in early access, the game received three larger updates.

- "Crush Depth" (released 12 August 2024), expanded the playable facility with the Security Sector and Hydroplant reservoir zone, and introduced new mechanics and items such as drivable vehicles, fishing, jetpacks, and a laser katana. The update also added new portal worlds containing alien environments, enemies, and resources. Alongside these features, the temperature system was reworked, additional crafting stations and deployable structures were introduced, and performance improvements were made.
- "Dark Energy" (released 4 February 2025), introduced the Reactors sector and its sub-area, Power Services, a new environment featuring bioluminescent flora. The update also added the hostile faction known as the Gatekeepers, along with new mechanics including teleporter pads and hard light bridge technology. Additional content included new weapons and equipment (such as a retractable harpoon spear, explosives, and a construction gauntlet), a new pet, expanded fishing zones, and improvements to existing areas. The patch also overhauled the trader system, allowing traveling merchants to be relocated to player bases.
- "Cold Fusion" (released 22 July 2025), the final early access update, which marked the game's transition out of early access and into version 1.0. The update introduced the Residence Sector, a frozen zone with extreme weather hazards and new anomalies. It added the Enhancement Bench, a system for upgrading weapons, armor, and biometric gear, including access to Artifact weapons previously used by the Gatekeepers. Other additions included new environmental threats such as blackouts, black fog, and energy-leeching entities, as well as an overhaul of base assaults and several quality-of-life improvements. The update also added new creatures, including the Moving Box, a mimic-like companion that collects items for players.

=== Full release ===
Sony announced that Abiotic Factor would be available on PlayStation Plus at the 2025 State of Play on 12 February 2025, citing a summer 2025 release date. After more than a year of updates introducing new mechanics and ecosystems, the "Cold Fusion" update was announced in June 2025 for release the following month, marking the game's transition out of early access. Alongside this, PlayStation 5 and Xbox Series X/S versions were confirmed. The console versions of the game were ported by a partner.

The full release on 22 July 2025 also saw the game added to PlayStation Plus and Xbox Game Pass at launch. By August 2025, Abiotic Factor had sold 1.5 million copies. On 4 May 2026, the "Cosmic Companions" update was released, which reworked pets, added a chemistry system, and various new items. The update also featured a collaboration with the horror simulation video game Voices of the Void, including various items from the game as well as a smaller version of the Dunkeltaler Forest map seen in Voices of the Void.

== Reception ==
Reception

Aggregate scores
Aggregator	Score
Metacritic	(PC) 88/100
OpenCritic	83% recommend

Review scores
Publication	Score
PC Gamer (UK)	92%
Game8	86/100

=== Critical response ===
Abiotic Factor received critical acclaim upon its full release. On the review aggregation website Metacritic, as of August 2025, the game holds a score of 88/100 based on 4 critic reviews. As per OpenCritic, 83% of the six critics recommend it.

Morgan Park of PC Gamer described it as "one of the greatest survival crafting games ever made" and a "classic in the making", awarding it a score of 92%. He praised the game for its unique portal worlds, breadth of content and intriguing combat options but noted that combat can feel clunky at times. PC Gamer later awarded the game as the best co-op game for PCs of 2025. XboxEra scored Abiotic Factor 8.2 out of 10, describing it as a "charming take on the survival genre, full of great mechanics and systems, an engaging story and world" and praised it as "an absolute blast to play with friends". Game8 awarded Abiotic Factor a score of 86/100, commending its blend of "humour, tension, and sci-fi chaos", as well as its replayability. However, Game8 also notes a couple of rough edges—some mechanics remain unexplained, and solo play can feel overwhelming—although these issues do not detract from the overall satisfying experience.

Abiotic Factor had an "Overwhelmingly Positive" rating on Steam in early access and at launch, with a 95.5% player satisfaction rating from over 24,000 reviewers at the time of the game's full release.

=== Sales ===
Abiotic Factor's early access launched with 200,000 wishlists on Steam and sold 250,000 copies in the first eight days. Within the first three months of early access, the game had sold 600,000 copies. The full launch of the title brought that number up to 1.5 million, in addition to the revenue from the PlayStation Plus and Xbox Games Pass launch deals. Deep Field Games, based in Dunedin, Otago, achieved international success with Abiotic Factor. A majority of the game's players are located in the United States (38%) and China (21%).

=== Awards ===
Year	Award	Category	Result	Ref.
2024	Golden Joystick Awards	Best Multiplayer Game	Nominated	
2024	NZ Game Awards (The Pavs)	Grand Prize	Won	
2024	NZ Game Awards (The Pavs)	Excellence in Design	Won	
2024	NZ Game Awards (The Pavs)	Excellence in Narrative	Nominated	
2024	NZ Game Awards (The Pavs)	Excellence in Accessibility	Nominated	
2025	Golden Joystick Awards	Best Indie Game	Nominated	
2025	Golden Joystick Awards	PC Game of the Year	Nominated	
