= William Cannon (cricketer) =

Australian cricketer

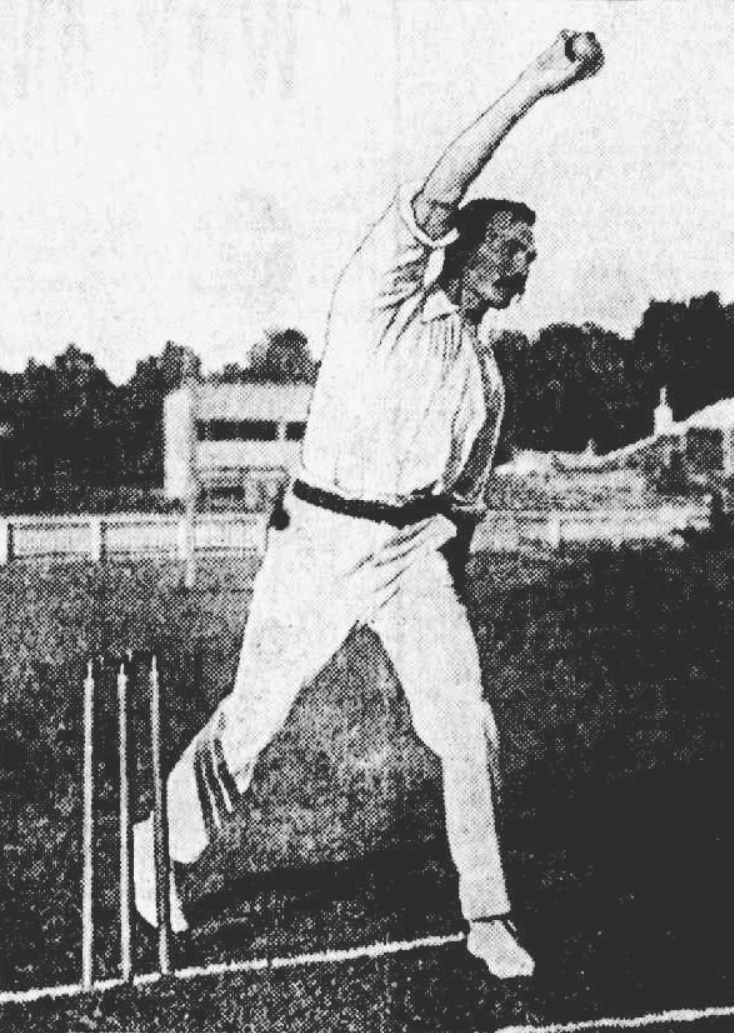

Personal information
- Born: 11 September 1871; Eaglehawk, Victoria, Australia
- Died: 29 April 1933 (aged 61); Melbourne, Australia

Domestic team information
- Years: Team
- 1912-1914: Victoria
- Source: Cricinfo, 16 November 2015

William Cannon (11 September 1871 – 29 April 1933) was an Australian cricketer. He played seven first-class cricket matches for Victoria between 1912 and 1914.

== See also ==
- List of Victoria first-class cricketers
