= Zafer Ergin =

Turkish actor

- Born: 30 August 1942 (age 83); Ankara, Turkey
- Occupation: Actor
- Years active: 1958–present
- Spouses: Melek Baykal (m. 1975; div. 1979) Binnaz Ergin (m. 1986)

Zafer Ergin (born 30 August 1942) is a Turkish actor who appears in Arka Sokaklar.

== Filmography ==
- Sümela'nın Şifresi: Temel – 2011
- Akasya Durağı – 2008 (guest appearance)
- New York'ta Beş Minare – 2010
- Güneşi Gördüm – 2009
- Ankara Cinayeti – 2006
- Arka Sokaklar – 2006–2026 – Rıza Soylu
- Büyük Buluşma – 2006 – Eren
- Döngel Karhanesi – 2005 – TMSF President
- Kanlı Düğün – 2005 – Cemal Bey
- Zalim – 2003 – Şanlı Bey
- Kurtlar Vadisi – 2003–2005 – Mehmet Karahanlı
- Hırsız – 2001
- Deli Yürek: Bumerang Cehennemi – 2001 – Şeref
- Sir Dosyasi – 1999
- Berlin in Berlin – 1993
- Bir Tren Yolculuğu – 1988
- Yaprak Dökümü – 1987
- Çalıkuşu – 1986
- Bağdat Hatun – 1981
