= Tabii =

Turkish digital video platform

tabii
- Website type: Digital content platform
- Available in: Turkish; English; Spanish; Arabic; Urdu
- Owner: TRT
- Website: tabii.com
- Registration: Required
- Launched: 2 May 2023
- Current status: Active

tabii is the international digital video platform of the Turkish Radio and Television Corporation. It was launched following its introduction on 2 May 2023.

TRT İzle, established on 22 March 2020, was a website where viewers could watch reruns of programs broadcast on TRT channels or watch the channels live. On 7 May 2023, Tabii began broadcasting with five different language options. It was initially announced that Tabii would be available free of charge in Turkey. It was planned to be made available to international users later in 2023. On 23 December 2023, TRT İzle was merged with Tabii. As of the new programming period beginning on 21 August 2024, a paid subscription service, Tabii Premium, was introduced for viewers.

The platform's subscriber base has increased over time, surpassing 5 million subscribers as of July 2024 and exceeding 10 million as of January 2025. With the goal of reaching more users globally, the platform made its first international expansion into the Middle East, followed by expansion into the European and North American markets.

tabii Çocuk is a digital children's channel that launched in Turkey on 23 April 2025, National Sovereignty and Children's Day.

== UEFA broadcasting rights ==
It was announced that, beginning with the 2024–25 season, UEFA Champions League, UEFA Europa League, and UEFA Conference League matches would be officially broadcast in Turkey by TRT and the tabii platform for three seasons.

According to a statement from TRT, matches involving Turkish teams would be available free-to-air on TRT 1 and TRT Spor. A larger number of matches would be available through TRT's digital platform, "tabii".
