= General Cannon =

General Cannon may refer to:

- Howard Cannon (1912–2002), U.S. Air Force Reserve major general
- Jerry Cannon (fl. 1960s–2020s), U.S. Army major general
- John K. Cannon (1892–1955), U.S. Air Force general
- Robert Cannon (Behram Pasha) (1811–1882), British lieutenant general
- Robert Milchrist Cannon (1901–1976), U.S. Army lieutenant general

== See also ==
- Fernando Canon (1860–1938), Filipino revolutionary general
