= Governor Cannon =

Governor Cannon may refer to:

- Newton Cannon (1781–1841), 8th Governor of Tennessee
- William Cannon (1809–1865), 40th Governor of Delaware
