= Cannan =

Cannan is a surname of Manx origin, and may refer to:

- David Cannan
- Denis Cannan
- Edwin Cannan, British economist
- Gilbert Cannan
- James Harold Cannan
- Joanna Cannan
- John Cannan, a British convicted murderer
- May Wedderburn Cannan
- Ron Cannan

== See also ==
- Cannon (surname)
- Cannan (region)
- Canaan (disambiguation)
- Canan
