= Larry Cannon =

Larry Cannon may refer to:

- Larry Cannon (basketball) (1947–2024), retired American basketball player
- Larry Cannon (racing driver) (1937–1995), American racecar driver
- Lawrence Cannon (born 1947), Canadian politician
