= Gamze Özçelik =

Turkish actress, model and TV hostess (born 1982)

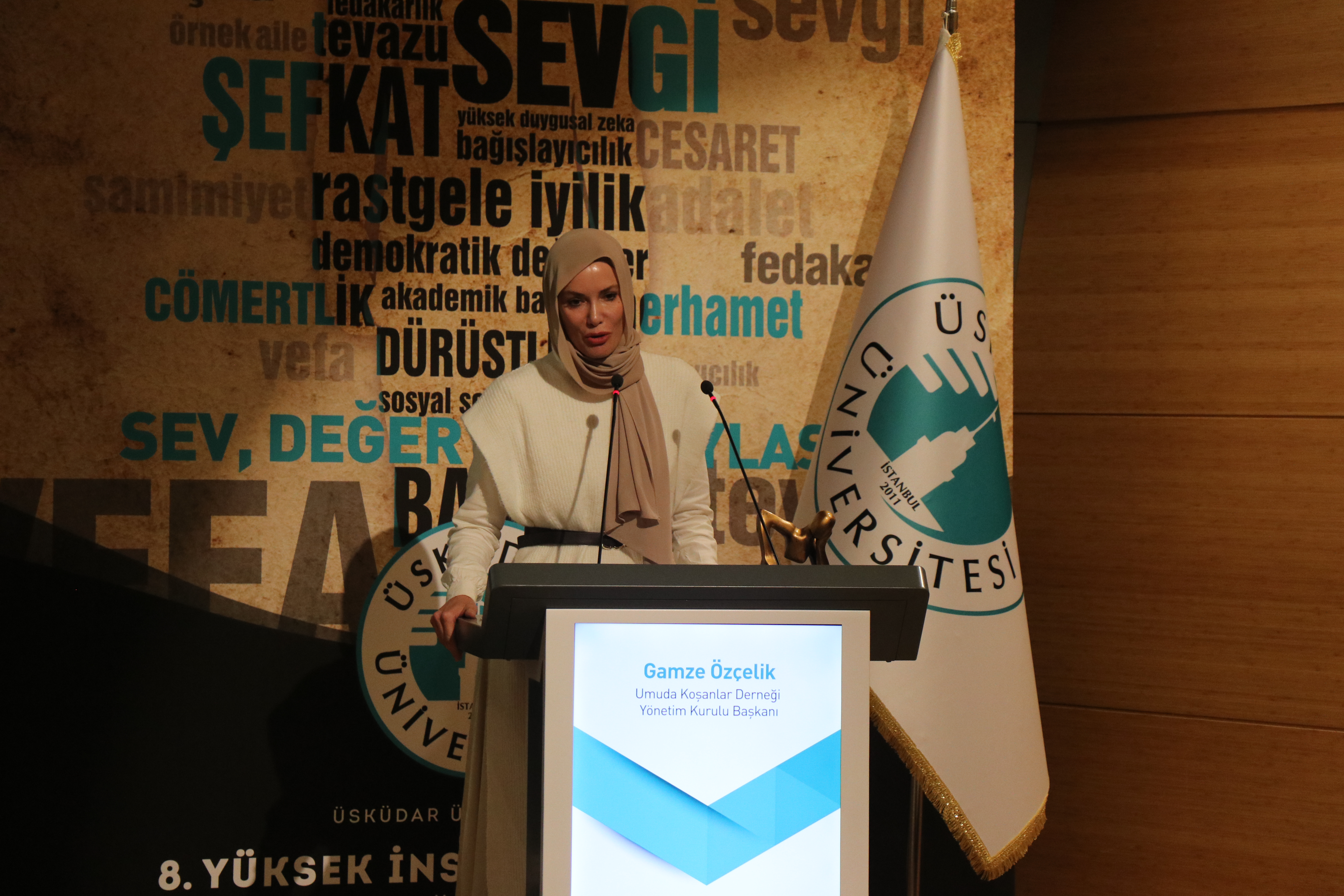
- Özçelik in 2023
- Born: 26 August 1982 (age 43); Istanbul, Turkey
- Occupations: Actress, model
- Years active: 1998–present
- Spouse(s): Uğur Pektaş (m. 2008; div. 2012) Reshad Strik (m. 2024)
- Children: 1

Gamze Özçelik (born 26 August 1982) is a Turkish actress, model and TV hostess. She is best known for hit crime series Arka Sokaklar which also starred her former husband Uğur Pektaş. Arka Sokaklar is known for being the longest running Turkish series. She played in series Serseri with Okan Yalabık. Her other popular series are series Tatlı Hayat (Turkish remake of The Jeffersons), Canan and historical series Mehmetçik Kut'ül Amare.

== Biography ==
Her maternal is of Turkish origin who immigrated from Thessaloniki, Ottoman Empire (now in Greece). She studied at Maltepe Anatolian High School, and went on to graduate from Istanbul Bilgi University. She won the Elite Model look 1999. After this she ventured into acting. Gamze was also a co-host of the Turkish version of Popstars, Popstar 1 and afterwards Pop Idol, Türkstar.

In 2004, she starred in a movie named Hırsız Var. In 2006, she played the role of a secretary in the play Seni Seviyorum staged by Tiyatrokare.

She became known for her character Zeynep Akyüz Ateş in the police series Arka Sokaklar. She married Uğur Pektaş, her co-star in this series. A son was born from this marriage. The couple divorced in 2011. She played the character of Elizabeth in the series Mehmetçik Kut'ül Amare. In 2017, she founded the aid association "Umuda Koşanlar."

== Filmography ==
=== Series ===
Year	Title	Role	Note
2000	Eyvah Kızım Büyüdü	Alt Komşu	
2001	Cinlerle Periler	Yasemin Barın	
2001–2003	Tatlı Hayat	Pelin (2)	
2003–2004	Serseri	Sibel	
2005	Düşler ve Gerçekler		
2005	Savcının Karısı	Melda	
2006–2009	Arka Sokaklar	Komiser Zeynep Akyüz Ateş	
2011–2013	Arka Sokaklar	Komiser Zeynep Akyüz Ateş	
2011	Canan	Ayşe Canan Bernard	
2013	Böyle Bitmesin	Emel (Guest role)	1 ep (48th)
2013	Fatih	Çiçek Hatun	
2018	Mehmetçik Kut'ül Amare	Elizabeth	

=== Cinema ===
- Hırsız Var! (2004)

== Personal life ==
Gamze Özçelik was raped by basketball player Gökhan Demirkol, and the video was uploaded to the internet in 2005. His conviction was overturned twice before being sentenced in 2015 to 8 years and 9 months prison. According to the trial, she was greatly affected by the rape.
