= Canaan Creative =

Singapore-based computer manufacturer

Canaan, Inc.
- Trade name: Canaan Creative
- Type: Public
- Traded as: Nasdaq: CAN
- Industry: Consumer electronics; Computer hardware
- Founded: 2013; 13 years ago
- Founder: N.G. Zhang
- Headquarters: Singapore
- Area served: Globally
- Key people: N.G. Zhang
- Products: Computer processors; Computer hardware
- Number of employees: >300
- Website: canaan.io

Canaan Inc., doing business as Canaan Creative and known simply as Canaan, is a Singapore-based computer hardware manufacturer. Established in 2013 by N.G. Zhang, Canaan specializes in Blockchain servers and ASIC microprocessors for use in bitcoin mining.

== History ==
In 2013, while still studying for a doctor's degree, N.G. Zhang established Canaan Creative in China, where he was chairman and CEO.

In 2016, Canaan attempted a reverse takeover for $466 Millions USD by Shandong Luyitong, a public company listed on the Shenzhen Stock Exchange.

In January 2019, reports surfaced that Canaan was considering an IPO in the United States. Canaan raised $90 million in their November 2019 IPO on the Nasdaq Global Market.

In 2022, Canaan's headquarters in Singapore were established.
