= Thomas Cannon (philanthropist) =

American philanthropist (1925–2005)

Thomas C. Cannon Sr.
- Tombstone of Thomas Cannon
- Born: August 3, 1925; Richmond, Virginia, US
- Died: July 2, 2005 (aged 79); Richmond, Virginia, US
- Occupation: Postal worker
- Spouse: Princetta Cannon
- Children: 2

Thomas C. Cannon Sr. (August 3, 1925 – July 2, 2005) was an American philanthropist. In 2004 he co-authored the book Poor Man's Philanthropist: The Thomas Cannon Story with the photojournalist Sandra Waugaman.

== Background ==
Cannon was born on August 3, 1925, to Eliza Cannon. Along with his mother and three siblings, Cannon moved to Chase City, Virginia after the death of Cannon's father, a Holiness minister, to live with his grandmother in a shack with no running water or electricity. He received his primary education at Chase City Graded School and attended the Thyne Institute. Both schools were segregated and Thyne required that students pay for tuition, book costs, and other expenses. As Cannon's family could not afford these expenses, Cannon dropped out in the seventh grade and began working a series of odd jobs to support his family. During this time he would make occasional visits to see his brother in Richmond, where he met Princetta (who was eleven at the time), who would eventually become his wife.

Around the early 1940s Cannon began working on a construction crew at Camp Pickett, where he dug ditches and served as a water boy. When he turned seventeen Cannon had his mother sign enlistment papers so he could join the United States Navy and serve during World War II. While in the Navy Cannon learned Morse code, which enabled him to serve as a signalman - a position that was not frequently held by black American soldiers during that time period. In 1944 he was sent to attend gunnery school, during which time his military unit was ordered to load a munitions ship that exploded, killing 322 soldiers. During his service Cannon was twice transferred to different ships, each of which was involved in accidents shortly after his transfer. Cannon would later credit these three incidents, along with several incidents where he narrowly escaped harm, as influential in his philanthropy, stating "Such escapes made me believe that I was being preserved for something".

After he returned from duty Cannon enrolled in the eighth grade in order to finish his schooling and received a high school equivalency degree. He also married his childhood friend Princetta and went on to attend Hampton University, where he graduated with a degree in fine arts in 1954. Prior to joining the US Postal Service in 1957, Cannon briefly served as an art consultant to Richmond schools. In the 1990s Cannon began serving as the full-time caretaker of Princetta, whose health began to decline in the beginning of the decade. This put a large financial strain on the family's finances and in 1995 a local Richmond developer began a benefit fund to raise money to provide the Cannons with a new home and help with Princetta's medical care.

In his later life Cannon developed colon cancer and he died on July 2, 2005.

== Philanthropy ==
Cannon first began donating money in 1972 and he frequently chose people that he had heard about in the news. In 1974 he sent a donation of $50 to each United States governor in honor of the United States Bicentennial and received letters from many of them, including future President Ronald Reagan. Cannon continued to send in donations to people he saw or read about in the news, accompanying each donation with a letter, poem, and a "hug coupon". Typical recipients of Cannon's philanthropy were people who had been featured in the news for having experienced hardship or for performing acts of heroism, generosity, or nobility. Most recipients were not independently wealthy, although Cannon would reward wealthy persons that he felt displayed good qualities. Over his lifetime Cannon is believed to have given away an estimated $156,000.

== Awards and honors ==
- Humanitarian Award from the Virginia Center for Inclusive Communities (1978)
- America's Award (1997)
- Strong Men & Women in Virginia History from the Library of Virginia (2016)
