= Ercan Saatçi =

Turkish singer-songwriter (born 1968)

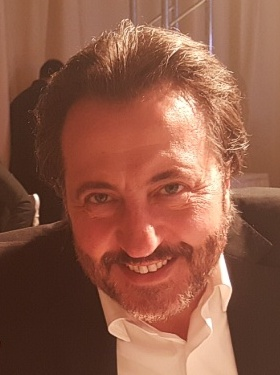
- Born: 13 March 1968 (age 58); Kemerburgaz, Eyüp, Göktürk, Istanbul, Turkey
- Education: Haydarpaşa High School, Istanbul Technical University Turkish Music State Conservatory
- Occupations: Musician, record producer
- Spouse: Gülümsün Özkök (1997-2009)
- Children: 2
- Musical career
- Years active: 1985–present
- Labels: Raks; DMC; Türker Prodüksyon; Prestij Müzik; Banko Müzik; Rec by Saatchi

Ercan Saatçi, born on 13 March 1968, is a distinguished Turkish musician and record producer. Hailing from parents with roots in Bayburt, he has become a prominent figure in the Turkish music scene, particularly within Grup Vitamin, gaining widespread recognition since the early 1990s due to the successful sales of his albums.

He was known for being a member of "İzel-Çelik-Ercan", together with İzel and Çelik, who announced they would make a comeback in 2022. Saatçi owns "Rec by Saatchi", his own record label. Saatçi wrote columns at Hürriyet and Fanatik.

== Discography ==
Source:

== Albums ==
- 1991: Özledim (as İzel-Çelik-Ercan, feat. İzel and Çelik)
- 1993: İşte Yeniden (as İzel-Ercan, feat. İzel)
- 1995: Sayenizde
- 1998: Manşet
- 2003: Laila Orient

== Singles ==
- 1996: Tam On Dört Saat Oldu
- 2020: Kara Kışlar

== Compilation albums ==
- 2001: Laila
