= Thomas Cannon (author) =

English author (1720–??)

Thomas Cannon (1720–?) of Gray's Inn was an English author of the 18th century. He wrote what may be the earliest published defence of homosexuality in English, Ancient and Modern Pederasty Investigated and Exemplify'd (1749) and may also have collaborated with John Cleland, author of Fanny Hill.

== Life ==
A son of Robert Cannon, Dean of Lincoln, Cannon had a serious falling out with Cleland which indirectly led to his prosecution. In 1748, Cleland was sent to prison for failing to pay debts to Cannon and another man. It was while in prison that Cleland published Fanny Hill. Just before the second volume appeared, Cannon lodged a legal complaint against Cleland, claiming that he was now sending anonymous letters containing abusive and slanderous accusations. Cleland accused Cannon of attempted murder, and of being homosexual.

"That celebrated passion, sealed by sensualists, espoused by philosophers, enshrined by kings, is now exploded with one accord and disowned by the meanest beggar. Wherefore since fashion discountenances, law punishes, God forbids, the detested Love, we may sure discuss it with freedom and the most philosophical exactness. Every dabbler knows by his classics that it was pursued and praised with the height of liberty, boy love ever was the top refinement of most enlightened ages. Unnatural Desire is a Contradiction in Terms; downright Nonsense. Desire is an amatory Impulse of the inmost human Parts: Are not they, however constructed, and consequently impelling, Nature? Nature sometimes assumes an unusual appearance, but the extraordinary pederast seeing fruition is as naturally acted as the ordinary woman’s man in that pursuit."

Ancient and Modern Pederasty Investigated and Exemplify’d, 1749

A few weeks after Cleland's accusations, Cannon arranged the printing of Ancient & Modern Pederasty. Despite its illegal subject matter, the pamphlet might never have come to the attention of the authorities had it not been for the embittered Cleland who, after being released from prison for debt, was re-arrested in 1749 for obscenity due to Fanny Hill. Cleland vindictively wrote to the Duke of Newcastle's law clerk drawing his attention to Cannon's pamphlet. This prompted a letter from Newcastle to the Attorney General, requesting the prosecution of Cannon.

Cannon and his printer were arrested but released on bail of £400 each. Cannon fled abroad for three years. The printer was sent to trial, found guilty, and fined, imprisoned for a month, and also subjected to the public torture of the pillory.

Cannon's mother successfully petitioned the Duke of Newcastle for the charges against her son to be dropped, claiming he was repentant, and indeed, wished to return to England not only because of financial necessity, but in order to publish a retraction or recantation of the original pamphlet. No such text has ever come to light. After returning to England, Cannon lived quietly at Windsor with his mother and sisters, and never returned to public life again.

No copies of Cannon's pamphlet appear to have survived. The text was presumed lost to history until 2003 when what is presumed to be the majority of the work was discovered as quoted extracts in the original indictment against the printer, which survived in the records of the King's Bench. The text was finally published in Eighteenth-Century Life magazine in 2007.

What remains of Ancient and Modern Pederasty Investigated and Exemplify'd shows that rather than being a dry treatise, it is a somewhat gossipy and jokey anthology of homosexual advocacy, written with an obvious enthusiasm for its subject. It contains the words: "Unnatural Desire is a Contradiction in Terms; downright Nonsense. Desire is an amatory Impulse of the inmost human Parts: Are not they, however constructed, and consequently impelling, Nature?"

== Bibliography ==
- Hal Gladfelder, In search of lost texts: Thomas Cannon's Ancient and modern pederasty investigated and exemplify'd, "Eighteenth-century life", XXXI 2007 (n. 1), pp. 22–38.
- Hal Gladfelder, The indictment of John Purser, containing Thomas Cannon's Ancient and modern pederasty investigated and exemplify'd, "Eighteenth-century life", XXXI 2007 (n. 1) pp. 39–61.
- Thomas Cannon, Ancient and Modern Pederasty Investigated and Exemplify'd (excerpts) on WikiSource.
