= Zerrin Özer =

Turkish pop singer (born 1957)

- Born: 4 November 1957 (age 68); Ankara, Turkey
- Genres: Turkish pop; Anatolian rock; Arabesque; Turkish folk; pop-folk; Turkish classical
- Occupation: Singer
- Years active: 1975–present
- Labels: Kent; Fono; Tempa & Foneks; Prestij; Kiss; Class; Tan; TMC; Ozan Video; Atlas; PDND; Poll; Kemal Aslan
- Website: Official website

Zerrin Özer (born 4 November 1957) is a Turkish pop singer. She has been called Turkey's Janis Joplin by several fans. She has many famous hits such as "Gönül" (Heart), "Son Mektup" (The Last Letter), "Dayanamıyorum" (I Can't Stand It), "Dünya Tatlısı" (World Sweet), "Paşa Gönlüm" (My Great Heart), "Kıyamam", and "Ah İstanbul".

== Biography ==
She was born in 1957 in Ankara, Turkey. Between 1978 and 1980, she worked with İstanbul Gelişim Orchestra on jazz and dance music projects. In 1980, Özer won a "Golden Album" award with her song "Gönül". In 1982, she performed "Binbir Gece" ("Thousand and one nights") concerts at the Eiffel Tower in Paris, France. A year later Özer performed in Olympia Hall in Paris. She released "Dayanamıyorum" in 1987 and "Dünya Tatlısı" in 1988. In 1990, Özer married Alper Önal, but they divorced a year later. She won the "Best Album" award once more with her album "İşte Ben" in 1991. Her elder sister Tülay Özer was also a singer and was famous in the 1970s and 1980s. Tülay Özer recorded her last album in 1993.

In 2000, Zerrin Özer released a best-of album titled "Bir Zerrin Özer Arşivi". She married Levent Süren in 2006, but they divorced two years later. In 2006, she published her autobiography Bir Sarışın Küçük Kız. She appeared in "Orhan Gencebay ile Bir Ömür" ("A Life with Orhan Gencebay"), Orhan Gencebay's tribute album, and performed the song "Sev Dedi Gözlerim" ("My Eyes Said Love").

During an operation on her leg a scalpel was left inside her body, and later she underwent another surgery to remove the scalpel, which was unsuccessful and damaged her spinal cord. After using a wheelchair for 1.5 years, she was able to walk again following treatment.

On 16 June 2019, she married Murat Akıncı, who was 27 years her junior. After one day, Özer filed for divorce, as Akıncı faced allegations of fraud and connection to Adnan Oktar, a cult leader in Turkey. Their divorce was finalized on 30 January 2020.

== Discography ==
Albums (LP)

- Seni Seviyorum (1980)
- Sevgiler (1980)
- Ve Zerrin Özer (1981)
- Gelecek misin? (1982)
- Modern Arabesk (1982)
- Mutluluklar Dilerim (1984)
- Kırmızı (1985)
- Evcilik Oyunu (1985) (Has been released without the permission of the artist.)
- Dayanamıyorum (1987)

Albums (CD)

- Dünya Tatlısı (1988)
- İşte Ben (1990)
- Sevildiğini Bil (1991)
- Olay Olay (1992)
- Zerrin Özer (1996)
- Zerrin Özer '97 (1997)
- Ölürüm Ben Sana (2003)
- Ve Böyle Bir Şey (2005)
- Zerrin Özel (2007)
- Ömür Geçiyor (2007)
- Emanet (2009)

Compilations

- Bir Zerrin Özer Arşivi (2000)
- Ben (2002) (Has been released without the permission of the artist.)

Singles

- "Sizler ve Bizler / Yalvarırım" (1976)
- "Gönül / Yaman Olurum" (1979)
- "Dünya Tatlısı" (2001)
- "Yerin Hazır" (2010)
- "Fire" (2010)
- "Alim" (2010)
- "Giden Gitti" (2012)
- "Keşke" (with Ensar Cantürk) (2014)
- "Sevda Zindanları" (2014)
- "Yağmurlar (with İlker Özdemir)" (2015)
- "Zerrin Özer ve Saz Arkadaşları" (2016)
- "1 Şarkı 2 Zerrin" (2017)
- "Beni Tanıma" (2018)
- "Arap Kızı" (with Bohem) (2020)
- "Ben Hep Buralardayım" (2021)
- "Can Hüseyin" (2022)
- "Basit Numaralar" (2023)
- "Harbiden Git" (feat. Saz Arkadaşları) (2023)
- "Külfet" (2023)
- "Yamalı Yüreğim" (2023)
- "Ne Hâlin Varsa Gör" (2024)
- "Denizsiz Liman" (feat. Mehmet Elmas) (2024)
- "Her Gün Olay" (2024)
- "Affet" (2024)
- "Akıllı Ol" (feat. Serap Zincir) (2025)
- "İtirazım Var" (feat. Eypio) (2025)

== See also ==
- List of Turkish musicians
- Turkish music
