= Armağan Çağlayan =

Turkish attorney (born 1966)

- Born: Ali Armağan Çağlayan; 8 April 1966 (age 59); Istanbul, Turkey
- Occupation(s): Television producer, lawyer, author, academic

Ali Armağan Çağlayan (born 8 April 1966) is a Turkish television producer and lawyer.

== Career ==
Çağlayan taught Creativity in Communication as a research assistant at the Faculty of Art and Design at Istanbul Kültür University and lectured at the Public Relations and Advertising and Visual Communication departments at Beykent University.

He later worked as a columnist and conducted interviews for Radikal newspaper. On 3 February 2016, he started writing for Nokta magazine.

In April 2017, Çağlayan continued his career by preparing reports for Posta, and a month later left his position as a journalist and joined Kanal D on 8 June 2017. 17 Following the sale of Kanal D to Demirören Media Group on 17 May 2018, he was dismissed along with many other media employees. On 14 March 2018, he joined Popstar 2018 singing contest as a judge. However, this program did not reach the required rating and made an early final on 23 May 2018.
