= Edwin Bennion Cannon =

American politician

Edward Bennion Cannon

Member of the Utah State Senate from the 6th district
- In office January 8, 1951 – 1954

Personal details
- Born: January 2, 1910 Salt Lake City, Utah, U.S.
- Died: November 12, 1963 (aged 53) Salt Lake City, Utah, U.S.
- Party: Republican
- Spouse: Beth Christensen (m. 1938)
- Children: 4
- Relatives: John K. Cannon (brother); Angus M. Cannon (grandfather)
- Education: University of Utah
- Occupation: Attorney

Edwin Bennion "Ted" Cannon (January 2, 1910 – November 12, 1963) was an American attorney who served as a member of the Utah State Senate from 1951 until 1954 as a member of the Republican Party.

Cannon was born in Salt Lake City to a family with strong connections in the Church of Jesus Christ of Latter-day Saints (LDS Church), being related to Mormon pioneers like Angus M. Cannon and George Q. Cannon. After serving as a missionary and receiving a law degree, he worked as an attorney in Utah and later served one term in the Utah State Senate as a representative for Salt Lake County.

== Early life ==
=== Family background ===
Edwin Bennion Cannon was born in Salt Lake City on January 2, 1910, to John Mousley Cannon and Zina Cannon (née Bennion). His father was a Utah attorney and ranch owner who was active within the Church of Jesus Christ of Latter-day Saints (LDS Church), serving as counselor to Granite Stake president Frank Young Taylor at the time of his death. His mother was a theology teacher and administrator of Mormon groups within the Salt Lake City area. Cannon's paternal grandfather was Angus Munn Cannon, a brother of George Q. Cannon and president of the Salt Lake City Stake. Angus and George's parents (George Cannon and Ann Quayle) were British converts who had been baptized by John Taylor in 1840 before immigrating to the United States.

Cannon's parents John and Zina were married in 1893, and gave him ten siblings: sisters Beatrice, Mary, Lenore, Anne; and brothers John, Milton, Paul, Angus, Clarence and Sterling. During this period, John Mousley Cannon was also in a relationship with Margaret Cannon (née Peart) and fathered or adopted several children. These include United States Air Force general John K. Cannon, Marguerite, Jasmine Miller, Hyrum P. and Clyde Peart. (Note: Hyrum P. Cannon is the only one of these offspring mentioned in Cannon's Salt Lake Tribune obituary.) Cannon's father was also in a relationship with Harriet Seymour Cannon (née Neff) and fathered or adopted several more children.

=== Mission and education ===
In 1930, Cannon was called to volunteer with the Northwestern States Mission. His farewell event was attended by prominent church members including Hugh B. Brown and Milton Bennion. While working as a missionary in Alaska, Cannon took part in the state's rededication ceremony alongside then-mission president William R. Sloan and was a cofounder of an LDS Sunday School in Juneau during April 1932. He remained involved with the mission until at least March 1933.

In May 1935, Cannon was elected to the honor society of Phi Kappa Phi as a student of the University of Utah. He was also a member of the Pi Kappa Alpha and Delta Phi fraternities. He passed the bar later that year as a graduate of the University of Utah's law school.

== Career ==
Cannon officially joined the Utah State Bar as an attorney in January 1936. He was admitted to practice in federal court in September of that year following a recommendation from the District of Utah assistant attorney Scott M. Matheson.

In 1941, Cannon was associated with the law firm of Stewart and Hurd (formerly Stewart, Hurd and Parkinson). In 1944, he was elected treasurer of the Salt Lake County Bar Association.

=== Political career ===
In May 1950, Cannon was one of six candidates chosen by the Salt Lake County Republicans to go forward for the Utah State Senate primary elections. He finished the September primary elections with the second highest number of votes for a Republican and was one of three candidates chosen to go forward for the general election. Cannon was elected in November of that year to serve as one of three State Senators for Salt Lake County, alongside fellow Republican candidate Elias Day and Democratic Party candidate Edward H. Watson.

Cannon took his seat on January 8, 1950 and was appointed to Governor J. Bracken Lee's advisory committee. In January 1953, he began serving as chair of the Senate Judiciary Committee. The following month, he was one of seven senators appointed to a sifting committee, responsible for managing the 100+ bills and resolutions on the calendar.

His term as a state senator ended in 1954.

== Personal life ==
In September 1938, Cannon's engagement to fellow University of Utah graduate Beth Christensen was announced in The Salt Lake Tribune. They married on October 1 that year at the Salt Lake Temple with temple president Stephen L. Chipman as the officiant. The couple had two daughters (Carol and Elizabeth Jayne) and two sons (James E. and Drew D.).

=== Death ===
On November 11, 1963, Cannon received a basal skull fracture after falling down the stairs at his home. He died the following day at a hospital in Salt Lake City.

He was buried at Wasatch Lawn Memorial Park in Salt Lake City, following a funeral service on November 15.
