= The Cleaning Lady =

The Cleaning Lady may refer to:

- Cleaning lady, a woman who works as a cleaner
- The Cleaning Lady (Argentine TV series) (Spanish: La chica que limpia), a 2017 drama series
- The Cleaning Lady (Mexican TV series) (Spanish: La muchacha que limpia), a 2021 adaptation of the Argentine series
- The Cleaning Lady (American TV series), a 2022 adaptation of the Argentine series
- "Sadie (The Cleaning Lady)", a 1967 song by Johnny Farnham

== See also ==
- Cleaner (disambiguation)
- Custodian (disambiguation)
- Janitor (disambiguation)
