= Muchacho =

Muchacho (Spanish, 'young man', or 'boy') may refer to:

== Arts and entertainment ==
- Muchacho (album), a 2013 studio album by the American band Phosphorescent
- Muchacho, a 1970 album by Sandro de América
- Muchacho (song), a song by Kings of Leon from the 2016 album Walls
- Muchacho (film), a 1970 film with Olinda Bozán and Sandro de América
- Muchacho, a 2009 novel by LouAnne Johnson

== Other uses ==
- Leonardo Muchacho (born 2000), Brazilian footballer
- 2946 Muchachos, minor planet

== See also ==
- Adiós muchachos (disambiguation)
- Muchacha (disambiguation)
- Chacho (disambiguation)
