= Muchacha =

Muchacha (Spanish for 'young woman', or 'girl') may refer to:

== Films and television ==
- La Muchacha del arrabal, a 1922 Argentine silent film
- La Muchacha del circo, a 1937 Argentine film
- Muchachas que estudian, a 1939 Argentine film
- Muchachas de Uniforme, a 1951 Mexican film
- La Muchacha del cuerpo de oro, a 1967 Argentine film
- Muchacha italiana viene a casarse (1971 TV series), a 1971 Mexican telenovela
- Una muchacha llamada Milagros, a 1974 Venezuelan telenovela
- Muchacha de barrio, a 1979 Mexican telenovela
- Muchacha italiana viene a casarse (2014 TV series), a 2014 Mexican telenovela

== Music ==
- "Muchacha Triste", a 1993 song by Venezuelan group Los Fantasmas del Caribe
- "Muchacha" (song), a 2020 song by Cuban band Gente de Zona and American singer Becky G

== See also ==
- La muchacha que limpia (disambiguation)
- Muchacho (disambiguation)
