= Bahar (TV series) =

Turkish television series

- Genre: Drama; Comedy; Medical
- Based on: Doctor Cha
- Written by: Ayça Üzüm; Atasay Koç; Deniz Akçay Katıksız
- Directed by: Neslihan Yeşilyurt
- Starring: Demet Evgâr; Buğra Gülsoy; Mehmet Yılmaz Ak
- Composer: Aytekin Ataş
- Country of origin: Turkey
- Original language: Turkish
- No. of seasons: 3
- No. of episodes: 64

Production
- Executive producer: Asena Bülbüloğlu
- Cinematography: Ahmet Bayer
- Editors: Şöhret Tandoğdu; Şenay İnce; Gizem Tekin
- Production company: MF Yapım

Original release
- Network: Show TV
- Release: 13 February 2024 – 28 December 2025

Bahar (English title: Blooming Lady) is a Turkish drama television series based on the 2023 South Korean series Doctor Cha. It aired on Show TV from 13 February 2024 to 28 December 2025. The series stars Demet Evgâr, Buğra Gülsoy and Mehmet Yılmaz Ak.

== Cast ==
- Demet Evgar as Bahar Özden
- Buğra Gülsoy as Evren Yalkın
- Mehmet Yılmaz Ak as Timur Yavuzoğlu
- Ecem Özkaya as Rengin Wallace
- Hatice Aslan as Nevra Yavuzoğlu
- Füsun Demirel as Gülçiçek Özden Saygın
- Elit Andaç Çam as Çağla Sert
- Mert Turak as Harun Demirsoy
- Demirhan Demircioğlu as Aziz Uras Yavuzoğlu
- Nil Sude Albayrak as Seren Tekin Yavuzoğlu
- Alisa Sezen Sever as Umay Yavuzoğlu
- Hasan Şahintürk as Reha Saygın
- Sena Kalip as Parla Yavuzoğlu
- Ege Erkal as Doruk Özdemir
- Doğan Can Sarıkaya as Cem Yalkın
- Mert Öner as Ferdi Çakır
- Emre Karayel as Tolga Okaner
- İrem Kahyaoğlu as Ahu
- Özgü Delikanlı as Yıldırım
- Başak Akan as Suzan
- Esra Ruşan as Naz Irmaksoy
- Can Kızıltuğ as Yusuf
- Büşra Pekin as Süreyya Biçer
- Elçin Afacan as Eylem
- Sumru Yavrucuk as Leyla Yavuzoğlu
- Nihal Yalçın as Efsun Köksal
- Ümmü Putgül as Fidan
- Sonat Tokuç as Candaş Korkmaz
- Uygar Özçelik as Selim Çevik
- Zeynep Atılgan as Kiraz
- Nizam Namidar as Rıza Tekin
- Devrim Kabacaoğlu as Uğur Aydın
