= Yusuf Çim =

Turkish actor, singer, TV presenter and model (born 1991)

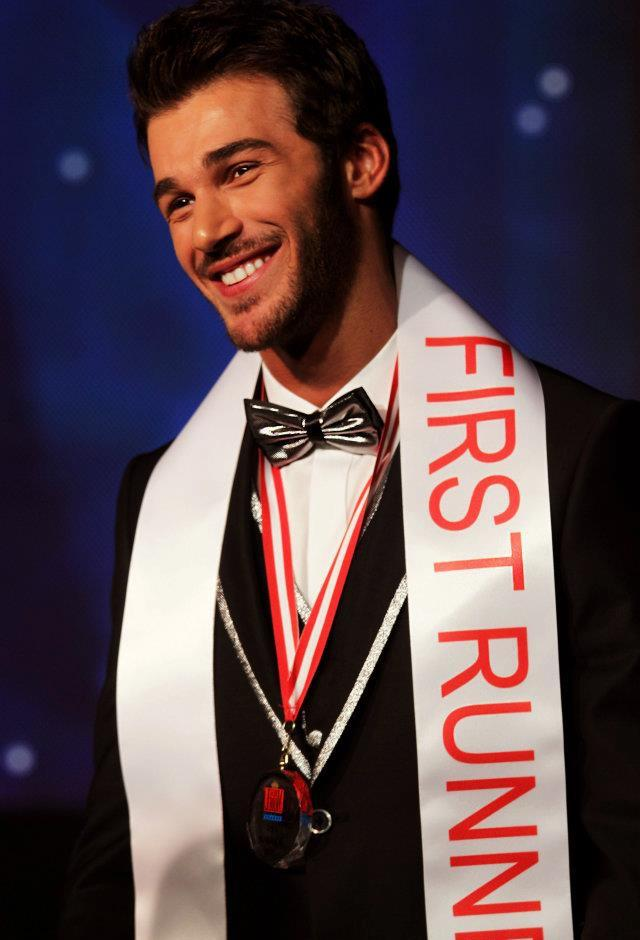
- Pronunciation: You-soof Chim
- Born: 26 September 1991 (age 34); Istanbul, Turkey
- Citizenship: Turkish
- Occupations: Actor, singer, tv presenter and model
- Years active: 2013–present
- Notable work: Çilek Kokusu
- Height: 1.88 m (6 ft 2 in)
- Awards: 1

Yusuf Çim (born 26 September 1991) is a Turkish actor, singer, TV presenter and model.

== Personal life ==
He was born on 26 September 1991 in the Fatih district of Istanbul. He is originally from the Alucra district of Giresun. Çim is the youngest member of a family of 3 children.

== Education ==
He graduated from Beyoğlu Anatolian Technical and Industrial Vocational High School, Department of Computer Technology.

He also received acting training at Akademi 35 Buçuk Art House.

== Career ==
=== Modelling career ===
Both before and after the 2011 Best Model of Turkey competition Çim appeared in many fashion shows. He has appeared on fashion shows such as Fashion Week, Günsel Ülkü, Forever Young and walked on the podium for well-known brands like Damat, Kiğili, Tween, Ralph Lauren, Hatemoğlu, Polo, Mango, Marks & Spencer.

=== Music career ===
His music career began in August 2013 with his EP album Olsun Bi Kere. The album features 4 different versions of the same song.

=== Acting career ===
Çim started his acting career by signing a contract with Leo Medya Production. His first role was on the TV series Ezra, written and directed by Tayfun Güneyer, in which he played the role of Superintendent Mustafa. The series premiered in December 2014 on Show TV. He then appeared in Gold Production's 2015 series Çilek Kokusu opposite Demet Özdemir and portrayed the character of "Burak Mazharoğlu". In 2016, he starred in another series produced by Gold Production, titled Hanım Köylü, and played opposite Gülsim İlhan Ali.

=== Television career ===
Çim started his career as a TV presenter with the program Piramit, which was produced by C Production and aired on Show TV in 2015. He was the main presenter of the competition program in which Evrim Akın and Gökhan Yıkılkan were the main coaches. He also presented Show TV's special 2016 New Year program, 'Sibel Can ile Yılbaşı Özel'.

== Other ventures ==
- Aside from his professional life, Çim has taken part in a number of charitable activities. With the help of the Down Syndrome Association, he created a project titled "Don't Forget This Year!" to help children with Down Syndrome.
- In 2016, Çim became the advertising face of the Loft brand, and had previously been included in the catalog shoot of the same brand.

== Filmography ==
Films
Year	Title	Role	Notes
2019	Bana Bir Aşk Şarkısı Söyle		Leading role
2019	Hababam Sınıfı Yeniden	Yakışıklı	Leading role
2021	Hababam Sınıfı Yaz Oyunları	Yakışıklı	Leading role
2026	Kıbrıs Türküsü	Cengiz Topel	Guest appearance
Web series
Year	Title	Role	Notes
2022	Hayaller ve Hayatlar	Sergen	Leading role
2022	Sonsuza Dek Nedime	Poyraz	Leading role
2023–2025	Mevlânâ Celâleddîn-i Rûmî	Sultan Walad	Supporting role
TV series
Year	Title	Role	Notes
2014	Ezra	Superintendent Mustafa	Leading role
2015	Çilek Kokusu	Burak Mazharoğlu	Leading role
2016	Hanım Köylü	Ferit Sabit	Leading role
2017	İçimdeki Fırtına	Emre Bademli	Leading role
2017	Seven Ne Yapmaz	Ozan Ekinsoy	Leading role
2018	Servet	Can Yiğit	Leading role
2019	İyi Günde Kötü Günde	Ediz	Guest appearance
2020–2021	Akrep	Aras	Leading role
2022–2024	Aldatmak	Ozan Yenersoy	Leading role
2024	Kirli Sepeti	Mert Karabey	Supporting role
2026	Evlilik Güzeldir	Can Ateş	Leading role

== Discography ==
Year	Title	Label	Sales
2013	Olsun Bi Kere	Poll Production	

== Awards ==
Year	Award-giving organization	Category	Source	Conclusion
2014	20th MGD Golden Lens Awards	Best Breakthrough Artist		Won
