= Love Tactics 2 =

Turkish comedy film

- Turkish: Aşk Taktikleri 2
- Directed by: Recai Karagöz
- Written by: Pelin Karamehmetoğlu
- Produced by: Mine Yilmaz
- Starring: Demet Özdemir; Şükrü Özyıldız; Atakan Çelik
- Cinematography: Olcay Oguz
- Edited by: Zeki Öztürk
- Music by: Jingle Jungle; Mert Oktan
- Production company: Lanistar Media
- Distributed by: Netflix
- Release date: 14 July 2023
- Running time: 98 minutes
- Country: Turkey
- Language: Turkish

Love Tactics 2 (Turkish: Aşk Taktikleri 2) is a Turkish film directed by Recai Karagöz, written by Pelin Karamehmetoğlu. It is the sequel to the 2022 film Love Tactics, and features Demet Özdemir, Şükrü Özyıldız and Atakan Çelik. The film was released on 14 July 2023 on Netflix.

== Cast ==
- Demet Özdemir as Aslı
- Şükrü Özyıldız as Kerem
- Atakan Celik
- Deniz Baydar
- Hande Yilmaz
- Bora Akkaş
- Melisa Döngel
- Jeyhun Mengiroglu
- İpek Tuzcuoğlu
- Kerem Atabeyoğlu

== Production ==
The film was announced by Lanistar Media on Netflix. Demet Özdemir, Şükrü Özyıldız and Atakan Çelik reprised their roles from the 2022 film. Principal photography commenced in 2023 and was mainly shot in Istanbul, Turkey.

== Reception ==
Barbara Shulgasser-Parker of Common Sense Media awarded the film 2/5 stars. Anweshak Tejendra of The Envoy Web rated the film 2.5/5 stars.

The film was also reviewed by Liz Kocan for Decider, and Amanda Guarragi for Ready Steady Cut.
