= Ekin Mert Daymaz =

Turkish actor

- Born: 2 December 1990 (age 35); Arnhem, Netherlands
- Occupations: Actor, model
- Years active: 2014–present

Ekin Mert Daymaz (born 2 December 1990) is a Turkish actor and model.

== Life ==
Daymaz was born in Arnhem, the Netherlands, to a family who were originally from Sivas. He later became a contestant on Best Model of Turkey and ranked 3rd. As of 2018, he has appeared in five different series. His debut is youth series Not Defteri (2014). The next summer, he portrayed the character of Volkan Mazharoğlu on Çilek Kokusu. It was followed by his role on FOX's romantic comedy series Hayat Sevince Güzel, in which he appeared in a leading role. He joined in 100th episode of the military series Savaşçı.

Daymaz studies coaching and fitness at Haliç University.

== Filmography ==
Films
Year	Title	Role	Notes
2018	Prangalı Yarim	Bahri	TV film
2018	Aşktroloji	Cem	TV film
2019	Mirasyedi	Ozan	TV film
2023	Her Şeye Rağmen	Orhan	Supporting role
2024	Biricik Sevgilim	Mesut	Lead role
Web series
Year	Title	Role	Notes
2022	Hayaller ve Hayatlar	Emre	Lead role
2023	Rüyanda Görürsün	Emre	Supporting role
2024	Esas Oğlan	Tarık	Guest appearance
TV series
Year	Title	Role	Notes
2014	Not Defteri	Egemen Şanoğlu	Lead role
2015	Çilek Kokusu	Volkan Mazharoğlu	Lead role
2016	Hayat Sevince Güzel	Savaş Göçer	Lead role
2017	Kırlangıç Fırtınası	Şahin Turaboğlu	Lead role
2018	Ağlama Anne	Mert Bayer	Lead role
2019	Payitaht: Abdülhamid	Gazeteci Arif	Supporting role
2020	Gençliğim Eyvah	Ahmet Asmalı	Lead role
2021	Savaşçı	Görkem İlbeyli	Lead role
2022	Seni Kalbime Sakladım	Civanmert	Lead role
2024	Bir Sevdadır	Tufan Karlıca	Lead role
2024–2025	Kuruluş Osman	İlbay	Supporting role
2026	Yeraltı	Ferhat Hanoğlu	Supporting role
