= Şükrü Özyıldız =

Turkish actor

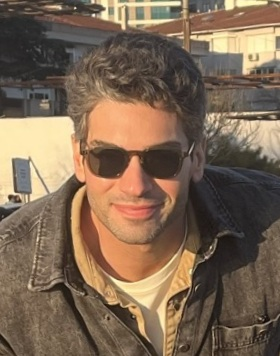
- Özyıldız in Nefes Nefese TV series
- Born: February 18, 1988 (age 38); İzmir, Turkey
- Occupation: Actor
- Years active: 2011–present

Şükrü Özyıldız (born 18 February 1988) is a Turkish actor.

== Early life ==
Özyıldız was born in İzmir. The maternal side of his family is of Rûm descent who immigrated from Rhodes, and his father is from Trabzon.

He studied Business Administration at Ege University before traveling to Portugal as part of the Erasmus program. Since his youth, he has been interested in martial arts and competed in cage fighting in abroad. He later took acting workshops at the Müjdat Gezen Art Center.

== Career ==
=== TV series ===
Özyıldız made his debut with the daily series Derin Sular in 2011 alongside Hilal Altınbilek. He had guest roles in series "Çalıkuşu", "Uçurum".

He played Efe and followed it up by portraying Mete in Kış Güneşi opposite Aslı Enver. He starred in Tatlı Küçük Yalancılar, an adaptation of Pretty Little Liars. With Kerem Bürsin, Burcu Biricik, Yasemin Allen, he played Şeref Meselesi adaptation of Italy series.

Özyıldız has appeared in several television series like Çoban Yıldızı, Benim Hala Umudum Var, and Nefes Nefese. He also starred in the series Akıncı, based on a superhero concept.

In 2023, he starred as intelligence agent Onur Karasu in the romantic comedy drama series Ruhun Duymaz opposite Burcu Özberk.

He is currently playing a role of Commander Flavius in Kuruluş: Orhan Series.

=== Films and web series ===
He had guest role in Gülse Birsel's comedy series Jet Sosyete. In film, he played in the romantic comedies Her Şey Aşktan alongside Hande Doğandemir and Sevimli Tehlikeli alongside Ayça Ayşin Turan.

He appeared in Yılmaz Erdoğan's period film Ekşi Elmalar and portrayed the famous actor Ayhan Işık in the surreal comedy Arif V 216. In 2022, he starred in the Netflix film Aşk Taktikleri alongside Demet Özdemir.

=== Theatre ===
He performed in Who's Afraid of Virginia Woolf? (Kim Korkar Hain Kurttan) alongside Zerrin Tekindor. He also played the Mad Hatter in Alice Müzikali, a major musical adaptation based on Alice in Wonderland which later premiered on Disney+.

== Filmography ==
=== Films ===
Year	Title	Role
2013	Neva	Ilgın
2015	Sevimli Tehlikeli	Zarok
2016	Her Şey Aşktan	Burak
2016	Ekşi Elmalar	Özgür
2018	Cebimdeki Yabancı	Sinan
2018	Arif V 216	Ayhan Işık
2022	Aşk Taktikleri	Kerem
2023	Aşk Taktikleri 2	Kerem
2023	Alice Müzikali	Hatter
2026	D.I.S.C.O.	Agent 9

=== Television ===
Year	Title	Role
2011	Derin Sular	Toprak
2012	Uçurum	Attorney Tolga
2013	Çalıkuşu	Murat
2013–2014	Benim Hala Umudum Var	Ozan
2014	Ulan İstanbul	Emir
2014	Şeref Meselesi	Emir
2015	Tatlı Küçük Yalancılar	Eren
2016	Kış Güneşi	Efe / Mete
2017	Çoban Yıldızı	Seyit
2018	Nefes Nefese	Yusuf Alıcan
2021	Akıncı	Fatih / Akıncı
2022	Masumlar Apartmanı	Himself
2023	Ruhun Duymaz	Onur Karasu
2024	Karadut	Tayfun Karca
2024	Karşılaşmalar	Bülent
2024	Esas Oğlan	Ozan
2025	Zamanın Kapıları	Mert
2025–2026	Kuruluş: Orhan	Commander Flavius/Evrenos
2026	Mehmed: Fetihler Sultanı	Uzun Hasan
2026	Zeytin Ağacı	Özgür

== Awards ==
Year	Award	Category	Title	Result
2019	Watsons Awards	Most Beautiful Smile	—N/a	Won
2023	Golden Butterfly Awards	Best Romantic Comedy Actor	Ruhun Duymaz	Nominated
2023	Golden Butterfly Awards	Best Couple (with Burcu Özberk)	Ruhun Duymaz	Nominated
