= Miranda Kwok =

Canadian screenwriter, television producer, and actress

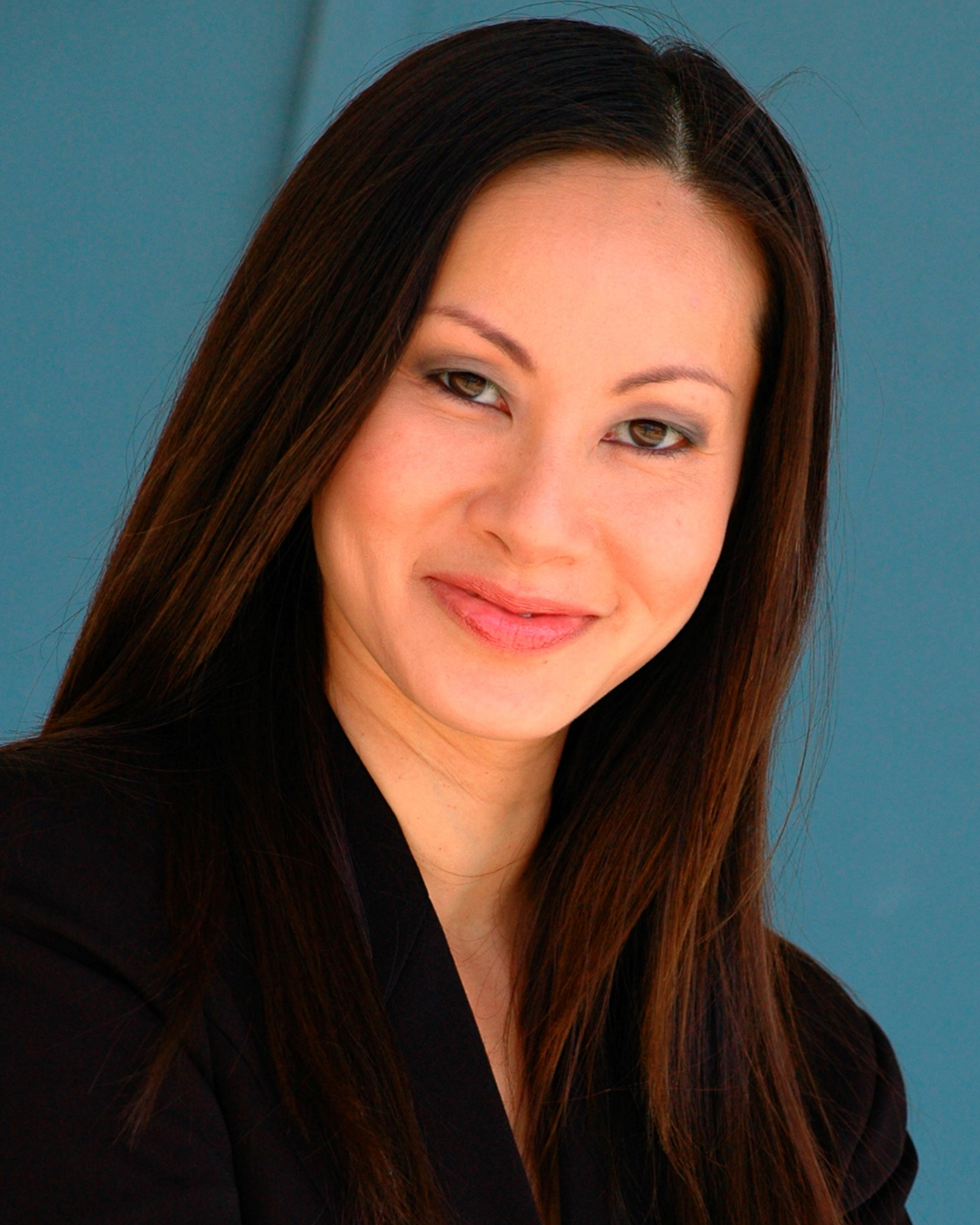
- Kwok in 2012
- Born: Canada
- Occupations: Screenwriter; actress; television producer
- Known for: The Cleaning Lady
- Website: mirandakwok.com

Miranda Kwok is a Canadian-American screenwriter, actress, and television producer best known as the creator, showrunner, and executive producer of the Fox drama series The Cleaning Lady, which premiered on January 3, 2022. Kwok won the 2023 Gracie Awards for her work on the show, in the Writer Scripted – Drama (TV – National) category.

== Studies and early work ==
Kwok began her studies in the arts at the age of ten when she attended the Claude Watson School for the Arts in Toronto, Canada. She majored in visual arts and minored in drama and dance. She made her television debut at the age of thirteen and has performed in several leading, supporting, and guest-starring roles in film, television, and theatre.

Kwok continued her education at Earl Haig Secondary School, where she completed the Claude Watson Arts Program as well as the Academy Program for the intellectually gifted. She also completed an Honors Bachelor of Arts in philosophy and psychology at the University of Toronto.

Kwok was a participant in Project: Involve, a mentorship program at the IFP in Los Angeles. Through its directors, she was recommended for and subsequently won a full scholarship award at the Los Angeles Film School in the Feature Development Program, which she completed with honors.

Kwok won the grand prize in the Slamdance Screenplay Competition for a historical drama entitled Song of Silence.

She is an honoree of the 2021 WGA's Showrunner Training Program., the 2010 WGA Writer Access Project for professional screenwriters, and the 2009 CBS Diversity Initiative Writers Mentoring Program.

== Writing career ==
Kwok worked as a staff writer on the first season of Spartacus: Blood and Sand, a 2010 original television drama on Starz. She wrote episode 105, "Shadow Games", and co-wrote episode 110, "Party Favors".

In 2014, Entertainment One Television acquired format rights to the Finnish fantasy drama series Nymphs, in order to develop and produce a US version, which was to be written by Kwok.

In 2016, Kwok joined the writing staff of the television series The 100 on the CW Network, where she worked as a writer and producer for four seasons, ultimately serving as supervising producer in 2020.

=== The Cleaning Lady ===
Kwok created the American drama television series The Cleaning Lady, based on the 2017 Argentinian television show La Chica Que Limpia. The Cleaning Lady premiered on Fox on January 3, 2022, as a midseason entry during the 2021–22 television season.

Warner Bros. had acquired the remake rights to the Spanish-language television series, and on October 22, 2019, it was announced that an English-language adaptation was being developed for Fox, with Kwok set to write the pilot script. Kwok was also attached to executive-produce with Melissa Carter and Shay Mitchell.

On January 23, 2020, Fox gave the project a pilot order, the first for the network's 2020–21 television season, with Fox Entertainment and Warner Bros. set as co-production partners.

The series was ultimately pushed back to the 2021–22 television season due to the COVID-19 pandemic, with Fox giving a series greenlight consisting of ten hour-long episodes on May 7, 2021. The show premiered on January 3, 2022.

On August 25, 2022, it was announced that Kwok was promoted to showrunner on The Cleaning Lady. On May 12, 2024, Deadline Hollywood announced that the show had been renewed for a fourth season but that Kwok and her co-showrunner and co-executive producer Jeannine Renshaw would not be returning.

Kwok won the 2023 Gracie Award for her work writing the show's pilot episode, in the Writer Scripted – Drama (TV – National) category.

Kwok, Mitchell, and Carter were listed in Variety magazine's 2022 TV Producers Impact List.

== Awards ==
- Women's Image Network Awards – Show Producer, for The Cleaning Lady (2022)
- Gracie Award – Writer Scripted – Drama (TV – National) (2023)

== Selected filmography ==
- Spartacus: Blood and Sand, "Shadow Games" – writer (2010)
- Spartacus: Blood and Sand, "Party Favors" – co-writer (2010)
- The 100 – executive story editor (2017)
- The 100, "DNR" – writer (2017)
- The 100, "Sic Semper Tyrannis" – writer (2018)
- The 100, "The Old Man and the Anomaly" – writer (2019)
- The 100, "The Queen's Gambit" – writer (2020)
- The Cleaning Lady – creator, executive producer, writer (2022–2025)
