= Sera Kutlubey =

Turkish actress (born 1997)

- Born: 24 October 1997 (age 28); Ankara, Turkey
- Occupation: Actress
- Years active: 2016–present

Sera Kutlubey (born 24 October 1997) is a Turkish actress.

== Life and career ==
Kutlubey studied at the Haliç Üniversitesi in Istanbul. Her career began with her debut in the 2016 series Kehribar. Later, she appeared in Babam ve Ailesi, before playing a supporting role in the series İsimsizler. Kutlubey's breakthrough was in the TV series Zalim İstanbul as "Cemre Yılmaz". She currently plays in the ongoing TV series Iyilik since 2022.

In 2022, she published her first book, Plüton'un Düş'üşü (Pluto‘s Dream).

== Filmography ==
TV series
Year	Title	Role	Notes
2016	Kehribar	Young Leyla	Supporting role
2016	Babam ve Ailesi	Hasret	Supporting role
2017	İsimsizler	Seher	Supporting role
2019-2020	Zalim İstanbul	Cemre Yılmaz	Leading role
2021	Hercai	Azra	Supporting role
2022-2023	İyilik	Damla Dinçer	Leading role
2023	Adım Farah	Merjan Azadi	Supporting role
2024	Inci Taneleri	Nehir Yücedağ	Supporting role

== Awards and nominations ==
Year	Award	Category	Work	Result
2019	Pantene Altın Kelebek	Best couple in a television series (with Ozan Dolunay)	Zalim İstanbul	Nominated
2020	Altın Zirve ve Kariyer Ödülleri	Best actress of the year	Zalim İstanbul	Won
