= The Cleaning Lady (Mexican TV series) =

Mexican crime drama television series

- La muchacha que limpia
- Genre: Drama
- Based on: La chica que limpia
- Starring: Damayanti Quintanar; Gustavo Sánchez Parra
- Country of origin: Mexico
- Original language: Spanish
- No. of seasons: 1
- No. of episodes: 8

Production
- Production companies: WarnerMedia Latin America; BTF Media

Original release
- Network: HBO Latin America
- Release: June 20, 2021

Related
- The Cleaning Lady (US); The Cleaning Lady (Argentina)

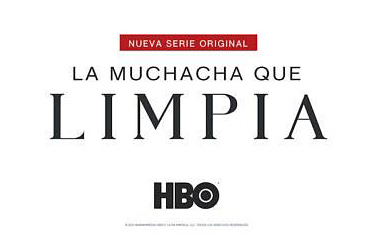
Spanish logo "La muchacha que Limpia"

The Cleaning Lady (Spanish: La muchacha que limpia) is a Mexican crime drama television series co-produced by WarnerMedia Latin America and BTF Media. The series is based on the similarly named Argentina series La Chica Que Limpia, winner of the Martín Fierro Federal de Oro award. It consists of eight one-hour episodes of and was originally scheduled to premiere on TNT Latin America, but it was moved to HBO and premiered on June 20, 2021.

The series stars Damayanti Quintanar and revolves around Rosa, a servant who witnesses a crime, and to save her life and her freedom she decides to become complicit to the murderers.

== Cast ==
- Damayanti Quintanar as Rosa
- Gustavo Sánchez Parra as Correa
- David Montalvo as Francisco
