= Erkenci Kuş =

Turkish television series (2018–2019)

- Genre: Romantic comedy
- Written by: Aslı Zengin; Banu Zengin Tak; Ayşe Kutlu
- Directed by: Çağrı Bayrak
- Starring: Demet Özdemir; Can Yaman; Özlem Tokaslan; Cihan Ercan; Öznur Serçeler; Birand Tunca; Berat Yenilmez
- Composer: Cem Öget
- Country of origin: Turkey
- Original language: Turkish
- No. of seasons: 1
- No. of episodes: 51

Production
- Executive producer: Faruk Turgut
- Production company: Gold Film

Original release
- Network: Star TV
- Release: June 26, 2018 – August 6, 2019

Erkenci Kuş (transl. The Early Bird; English title: Daydreamer) is a Turkish television series that aired on Star TV from June 26, 2018 to August 6, 2019. The series stars Demet Özdemir and Can Yaman.

== Plot ==
Sanem is a young woman who aspires to be a writer and wants to live on the Galápagos Islands. Despite working at her father's grocery store, she is forced by her parents to choose between an arranged marriage with her neighbor Muzaffer and finding a suitable job. Sanem lands a job at Fikri Harika, one of Turkey's leading advertising agencies, where Leyla, her sister, is an executive assistant. The owner of the advertising agency, Aziz Divit, has two sons, Emre and Can. Emre wants to take over the company, but his father believes Can is a better fit for the job and he appointed Can as the manager temporarily . Can has what his father wants for the company, but Can prefers to take photos in remote locations. Upon learning of his father's health problems, Can eventually agrees to run the company until his father returns for his trip. Aziz also tells Can to find the spy in the company who is helping their rival, Aylin. Emre doesn't like the idea of his brother being the manager, and believes that he should have the position. Emre's plan is to make him fail, to run the company himself. Sanem bumps into Can on a dark balcony at an opera party celebrating the company's 40th anniversary. Can thinks she is his girlfriend Polen, so he kisses her. Sanem realizes that she is fascinated by the stranger who kissed her on the balcony, and she gives him the codename Albatross. Sanem meets Can but doesn't care for him Emre makes her believe that Can only wants to increase the value of the company so that it can be sold. Can soon finds out the person he kissed was Sanem, he is interested to know her and falls in love with Sanem. There is a moment where he finds out she has a fiance and cannot reveal himself fully. So starts the young lovers finding their way through jealousy, family drama, corporate money issues. The show has lots of highs and lows. Erkenci Kus is drama, comedy all roll into one.

== Cast ==
- Demet Özdemir as Sanem Aydın: Intern and scriptwriter at Fikri Harika. She is Nihat and Mevkibe Aydın's daughter, Leyla's younger sister.
- Can Yaman as Can Divit: General manager, director and head of Fikri Harika agency, Emre's elder brother, Aziz and Hüma's son
- Özlem Tokaslan as Mevkibe Aydın: Sanem and Leyla's mother, Nihat Aydın's wife
- Cihan Ercan as Muzaffer "Zebercet" Kaya: Fellow resident of the Aydın's community. He seems to have one-sided love interest in Sanem.
- Öznur Serçeler as Leyla Aydın: Finance assistant at the Fikri Harika agency. Nihat and Mevkibe Aydın's daughter, Sanem's elder sister.
- Berat Yenilmez as Nihat Aydın: Mevkibe Aydın's husband, Sanem and Leyla's father
- Birand Tunca as Emre Divit: Finance Manager of Fikri Harika agency, Can's younger brother, Aziz and Hüma's son.
- Sevcan Yaşar as Aylin Yükselen: Ex-fiancé of Emre Divit
- Anıl Çelik as Cengiz "Ceycey" Özdemir: Employee at Fikri Harika, Sanem's best friend
- Tuğçe Kumral as Deren Keskin: Creative Director of Fikri Harika
- Ceren Taşçı as Ayhan Işık: Sanem's best friend, younger sister of Osman Işık, fellow resident of the Aydın's community
- Sibel Şişman as Güliz Yıldırım: Ex-Assistant of Aziz Divit, employee at Fikri Harika
- Tuana Tunalı as Metin Avukat: One of Can's best friends, lawyer of Fikri Harika
- Ali Yağcı as Osman Işık: Elder brother of Ayhan Işık, fellow resident of the Aydın's community
- Tolga Bayraklı as Akif: One of Can's best friends, owner of a printing company
- Asuman Çakır as Aysun Kaya: Fellow resident of Aydın's community, Muzaffer Kaya's mother
- Oğuz Okul as Rıfat
- Feri Baycu Güler as Melahat: Fellow residents of Aydın's community, owner of a salon
- Ahmet Somers as Aziz Divit: Can and Emre's father, ex-head and general director/manager of Fikri Harika
- Kimya Gökçe Aytaç as Polen: Can's ex-girlfriend, physicist in Europe
- Ayşe Akın as Arzu Taş: Model
- Baki Çiftçi as Levent Divit
- Aslı Melisa Uzun as Gamze: Employee at Compass Sports, Can's university friend
- İpek Tenolcay as Hüma Divit Erdamar: Can's and Emre's mother, Aziz Divit's ex-wife
- Dilek Serbest as Ayça
- Utku Ateş as Yiğit: Polen's brother, head of a writing and publishing company
- Tufan Günaçan as Samet Hoca
- Gamze Topuz as Ceyda: CEO of Compass Sports
- Özgür Özberk as Enzo Fabri: Head of a perfume manufacturing company
