= Gizem Karaca =

Turkish actress and model (born 1992)

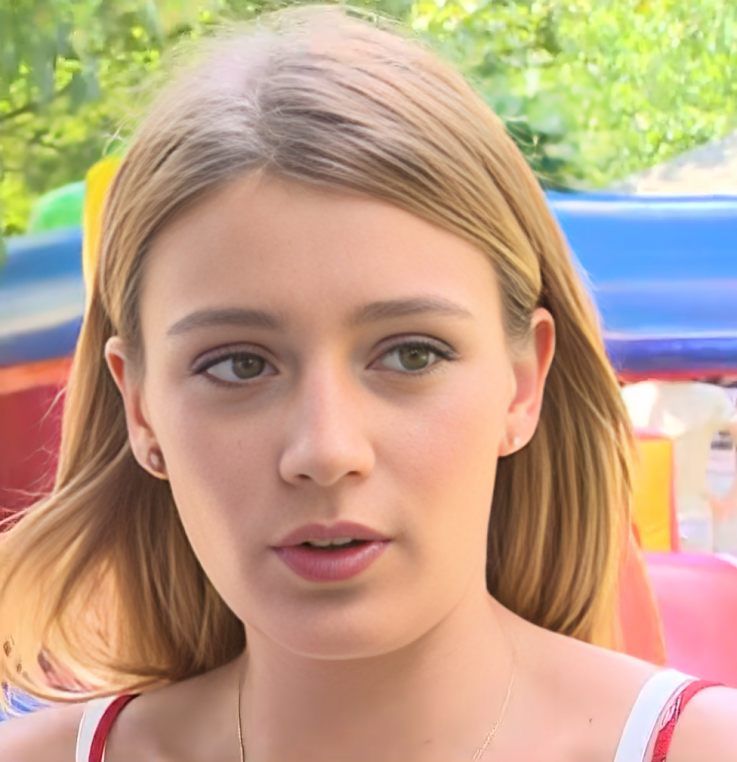
- Gizem Karaca in 2017
- Born: 7 September 1992 (age 34); Istanbul, Turkey
- Education: American Academy of Dramatic Arts
- Occupations: Actress; model
- Years active: 2014–present
- Height: 1.70 m (5 ft 6.93 in)
- Spouse: Kemal Ekmekçi (m. 2017)
- Beauty pageant titleholder
- Title: Miss Turkey World 2011
- Hair color: Blonde
- Eye color: Hazel
- Major competitions: Miss Turkey 2011 (1st Runner-up); Miss World 2011

Gizem Karaca (born 7 September 1992) is a Turkish actress and model who represented her country at the Miss World 2011 competition.

Karaca competed at the Miss Turkey competition held on 2 June 2011 at TIM Show Centre and finished second overall, which qualified her as Turkey's representative for Miss World.

She is best known for her roles in the series kara sevda Benim Hala Umudum Var, Alparslan: Büyük Selçuklu, Eve Düşen Yıldırım, and Adını Feriha Koydum: Emirin Yolu. She also starred in the movie Hürkuş, based on the life of aviator Vecihi Hürkuş.

== Life and career ==
Born on 7 September 1992 in Istanbul, Gizem Karaca is the daughter of Münevver and Cüneyt Karaca. Her family background is a blend of Balkan heritage; her paternal side consists of Turkish immigrants from Thessaloniki (modern-day Greece) who arrived following the fall of the Ottoman Empire, while her maternal lineage is of Albanian descent.

Due to her family's relocation during her youth, she spent her formative years in North America, attending elementary school in the United States and secondary school in Canada.

Upon returning to Turkey, Karaca enrolled at Istanbul University, where she studied French Language and Literature. Seeking a creative diversion from her rigorous academic schedule, she entered the Miss Turkey 2011 pageant, ultimately securing the second-place position. Following her graduation, she furthered her professional development by studying acting at the New York Film Academy in the summer of 2013. In her personal life, she married Kemal Ekmekçi on 16 September 2017.

== Filmography ==
=== Web series ===
Year	Title	Role	Network
2023	Bozkır		Blu TV
2023	Deneme Cekimi	Ece	Blu TV

=== TV series ===
Year	Title	Role	Network
2011	Muhteşem Yüzyıl	Cariye (guest)	Show TV
2012	Eve Düşen Yıldırım	Muazzez	Show TV
2012	Emir'in Yolu	Güneş Sancaktar	Show TV
2013–2014	Benim Hala Umudum Var	Umut Özden/Korkmaz	Star TV, Fox
2014–2015	Güzel Köylü	Gül Sümbül	Star TV
2016	İstanbul Sokakları	Nazlı	Show TV
2017	İçimdeki Fırtına	Deniz	Star TV
2017	Kara Sevda	Mercan (guest)	Star TV
2018	İnsanlık Suçu	Suna Değirmenci	Kanal D
2019–2020	Şampiyon	Elisa (guest)	TRT 1
2020–2021	Baraj	Bahar Özsoy (guest)	Fox
2021–2022	Alparslan: Büyük Selçuklu	Eudokia Makrembolitissa	TRT 1
2023-2024	Safir	Güneş (supporting actor)	ATV

=== Films ===
Year	Title	Role
2014	Seni Seviyorum Adamım	Ezel
2017	Küçük Ortak	Ceren
2017	Ay Lav Yu tuu	Sultan
2018	Hürkuş: Göklerdeki Kahraman	Hadiye
2018	Sosyetik Gelin	Selin
2018	Organik Aşk	Merve
2020	Bizim Semtin Çocukları	
2021	Dayı: Bir Adamın Hikayesi	Hatice
2021	Yağmur Rengi	Yağmur
2021	Elli Kelimelik Mektuplar	Güzide Duru
2023	Özür Dilerim	Merve

== Awards and nominations ==
- Miss Turkey 2011, first runner-up.
- Miss World 2011, the Best Dressed award.
