= Chacho =

Chacho is a male nickname in Spanish-speaking countries, often a diminutive form of "muchacho". It may refer to:

== People ==
- Chacho Peñaloza (1796–1863), Argentine military officer and politician
- Chacho (footballer) Eduardo González Valiño (1911–1979), Spanish footballer
- Chacho Vega (1945–2012), Bolivian footballer
- Chacho Álvarez (born 1948), Argentine politician
- Chacho Gaytán (born 1969), Mexican musician and composer

== Other ==
- Chachos, tortilla chip snacks by Keebler

== See also ==
- Muchacho (disambiguation)
