= Çilek Kokusu =

Turkish romantic comedy series

- Turkish: Çilek Kokusu
- Genre: Romantic comedy
- Written by: Banu Zengin Tak; Asli Zengin
- Directed by: Adnan Güler; Filiz Gulmez Pakman
- Starring: Yusuf Çim; Demet Özdemir; Ekin Mert Daymaz
- Opening theme: "Çilek Kokusu" by Esin İris
- Composer: Alp Yenier
- Country of origin: Turkey
- Original language: Turkish
- No. of seasons: 1
- No. of episodes: 55

Production
- Producer: Faruk Turgut
- Production locations: Bodrum; Istanbul
- Running time: 110 minutes
- Production company: Gold Film

Original release
- Network: Star TV
- Release: June 24 – November 27, 2015

Çilek Kokusu (English: Strawberry Smell) is a Turkish romantic comedy drama television series produced by Gold Film, starring Demet Özdemir, Yusuf Çim and Ekin Mert Daymaz. It was broadcast on Star TV in 2015.

== Synopsis ==
Asli Koçer (Demet Özdemir) loses her job after she meets with an accident because of a rich spoilt Burak Mazharoğlu (Yusuf Çim). However, things take an unusual turn when she finds herself applying for a job at his father's hotel in Bodrum.

== Cast and characters ==
Actor/actress	Character	Episode
Demet Özdemir	Aslı Koçer Mazharoğlu	1-23
Yusuf Çim	Burak Mazharoğlu	1-23
Ekin Mert Daymaz	Volkan Mazharoğlu	1-23
Gözde Kaya	Çağla	1-23
Mahir Günşiray	Nihat Mazharoğlu	1-23
Laçin Ceylan	Selda Mazharoğlu	1-23
Murat Başoğlu	Sinan Mazharoğlu	1-23
Mine Tugay	Elçin Mazharoğlu	1-23
Ugur Demirpehlivan	Emel Koçer	1-23
Zeynep Tugçe Bayat	Gonca	1-23
Anil Çelik	Erdem	1-23
Idil Sivritepe	Eda Mazharoğlu	1-23

== Episodes ==
Season	Episodes	Originally Aired		
Season	Episodes	First Aired	Last Aired	Network
1	23	June 24, 2015	November 27, 2015	
