= Birand Tunca =

Turkish actor and model (born 1990)

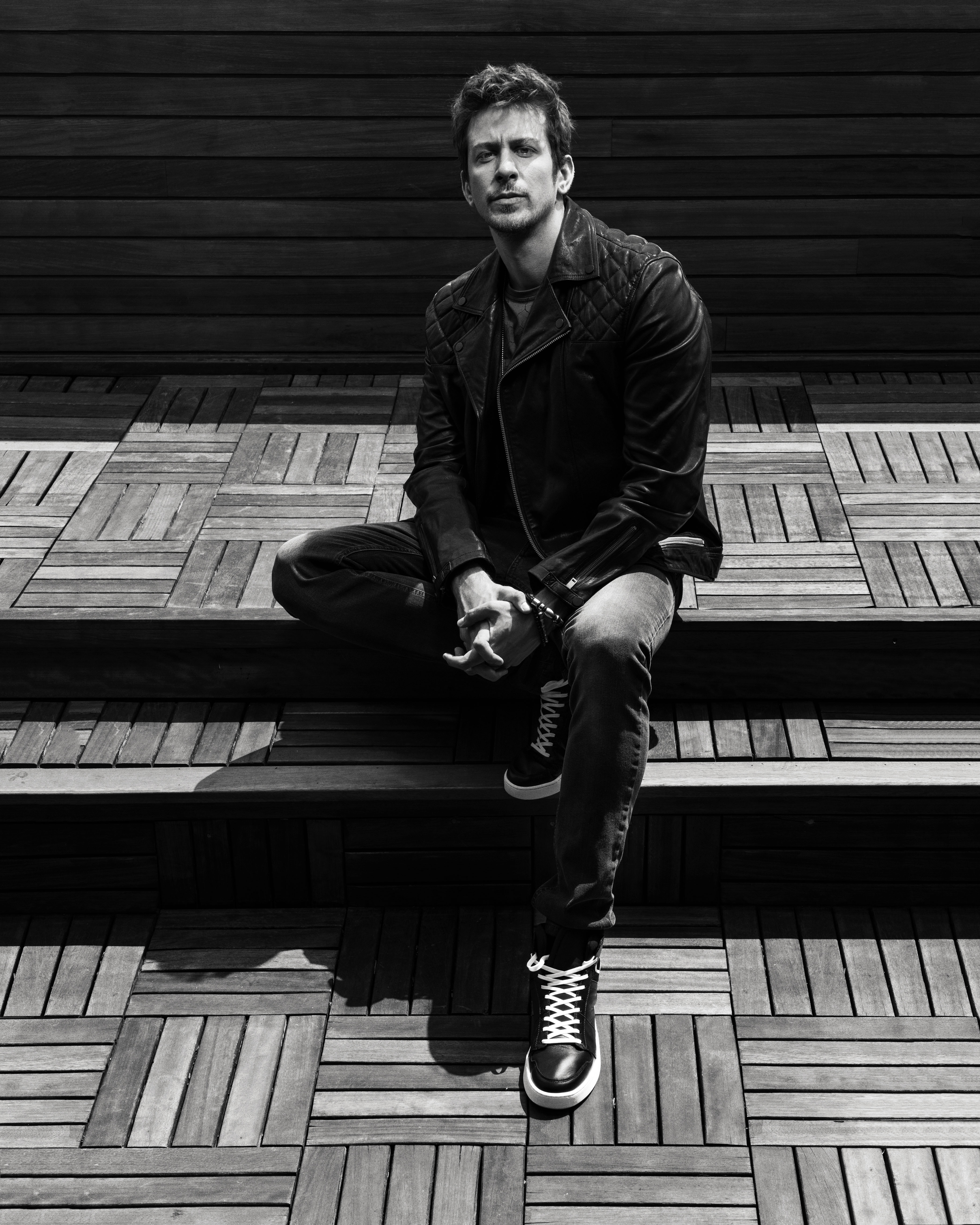
- Born: 5 October 1990 (age 36); Istanbul, Turkey
- Occupation: Actor
- Years active: 2014–present

Birand Tunca (born 5 October 1990) is a Turkish actor and model.

Born and raised in Istanbul, Tunca became interested in acting and modelling during his high school years. He studied theatre at the Müjdat Gezen Sanat Center Conservatory. Tunca made his debut in 2014 with a role in the historical drama series Diriliş: Ertuğrul. He first became noted for his role in the Aşk Laftan Anlamaz series in 2016. His breakthrough came with a recurring role in the romantic comedy series Erkenci Kuş, in which he portrayed the character of Emre.

== Filmography ==
- Kavak Yelleri (2008) – Ramazan
- Diriliş: Ertuğrul (2014) – Bisol
- Yunus Emre (2015–2016) – Alaiyeli Derviş Çağrı
- Aşk Laftan Anlamaz (2016–2017) – Emre
- Mehmetçik Kûtü’l-Amâre (2018) – Wilson
- Erkenci Kuş (2018–2019) – Emre Divit
- Aşk Oluversin Gari (2021) – Güney
- Biz Kimden Kaçıyorduk Anne? (2023) - Bionde Commisar
- Yardımcı Oyuncu (2023) - Servet
- Ayazın Sonu Güneş (2024) - Ayaz Ersoy
- Cennetin Çocukları (2025-2026) - Bekir
- Aynı Yağmur Altında (2026) - Kerem Aydan
- Muhabir (2026)
- Kızılcık Şerbeti (2026) - Ali Murat
