= Benim Hala Umudum Var =

- Genre: Drama romance
- Directed by: Deniz Akçay
- Creative director: Nisan Akman
- Starring: Gizem Karaca; Berk Oktay; Şükrü Özyıldız; Laçin Ceylan; Buse Arslan; Kağan Uluca
- Composer: Alp Yenier
- Country of origin: Turkey
- Original language: Turkish
- No. of seasons: 1
- No. of episodes: 33

Production
- Producer: Faruk Turgut
- Production location: Istanbul
- Running time: 90 minutes
- Production company: Gold Film

Original release
- Network: Star TV; Fox TV
- Release: July 1, 2013 – April 25, 2014

Benim Hala Umudum Var (transl. I Still Have Hope) is a Turkish television drama starring Gizem Karaca, Berk Oktay and Şükrü Özyıldız. It was broadcast on Star TV, and later on Fox TV between 2013 and 2014. The series is written by Deniz Akçay. The story takes place in one of the modest neighborhoods of İstanbul, following the life of a 23-year-old woman, Umut (Gizem Karaca). Her life takes a turn when she meets Ozan (Şükrü Özyıldız), an energetic and attractive young man at a hair salon. Suddenly, her life changes into something she has only seen on the theater stage or in movies.

== Cast ==
Actor	Role
Gizem Karaca	Umut Özden/Korkmaz
Berk Oktay	Hakan Demirer
Şükrü Özyıldız	Ozan Korkmaz
Laçin Ceylan	Asude
İpek Elban	Duygu
Buse Arslan	Beril
Savaş Alp Başar	Rüzgar Demirer
Efe Şengün	Mert Türkoğlu
Pınar Göktaş	Melis

== Series overview ==
Season	No. of Episodes	Start of the Season	End of the Season	Episodes	TV Channel
1	64	July 1, 2013	April 25, 2014	1 - 64	Star TV; Fox TV

== International broadcasters ==
Country	Network	Premiere date
Northern Cyprus	Star TV; Fox TV	July 1, 2013
Arab League	MBC4	October 21, 2013
Bulgaria	Diema Family	April 4, 2014
Romania	Kanal D	June 18, 2014
Pakistan	A-Plus TV	2014
North Macedonia	Kanal 5	2015
Poland	TVP2	September 1, 2017
