= Aslı Sümen =

Turkish model and actress

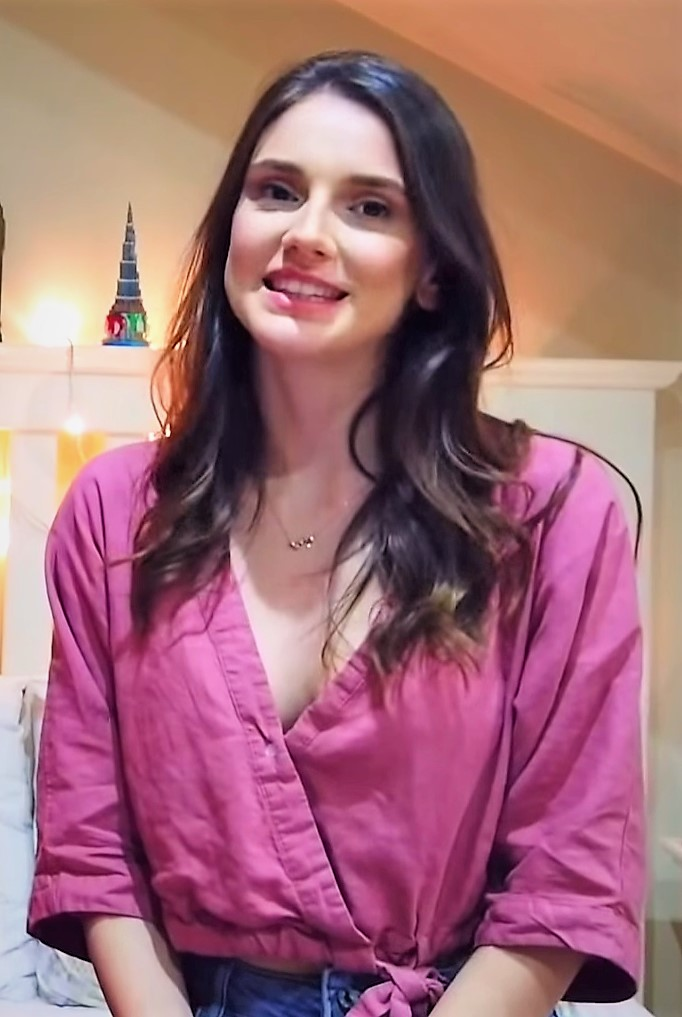
Sümen in 2019

Aslı Sümen is a Turkish actress, model and beauty pageant titleholder who was selected as Miss Turkey 2017.

Aslı Sümen was born in Mersin in 1993 or 1994, and graduated from Middle East Technical University in Business Administration. She is a dancer and a model.

Itır Esen was originally selected as Miss Turkey 2017 and Aslı Sümen was a runner up, but Esen was dethroned after a controversial tweet about the 2016 Turkish coup d'état attempt. Sümen was enthroned as Miss Turkey 2017 and represented Turkey at Miss World 2017 on 18 November 2017.

== Career ==
In 2021, she starred in TV series Baht Oyunu as Tuğçe Dikman alongside Cemre Baysel, Aytaç Şaşmaz and İdris Nebi Taşkan. In 2022, she had role in digital series Erkek Severse as Ezgi Uysal. Next she portrayed character of Ayşegül in TV series Gülümse Kaderine, which was unfortunately cancelled after 5th episode.

== Filmography ==
TV series
| Year | Title | Role | Note | Channel |
|---|---|---|---|---|
| 2021 | Baht Oyunu | Tuğçe Dikman | Leading role | Kanal D |
| 2022 | Erkek Severse | Ezgi Uysal | Supporting role | beIN CONNECT |
| 2022 | Gülümse Kaderine | Ayşegül | Supporting role | FOX |
| 2023 | Süper Kahramanlar – Altay | Selin | Supporting role | tabii |
| 2023 | Ruhun Duymaz | Hilal Koral | Supporting role | FOX |
