= Demet Özdemir =

Turkish actress (born 1992)

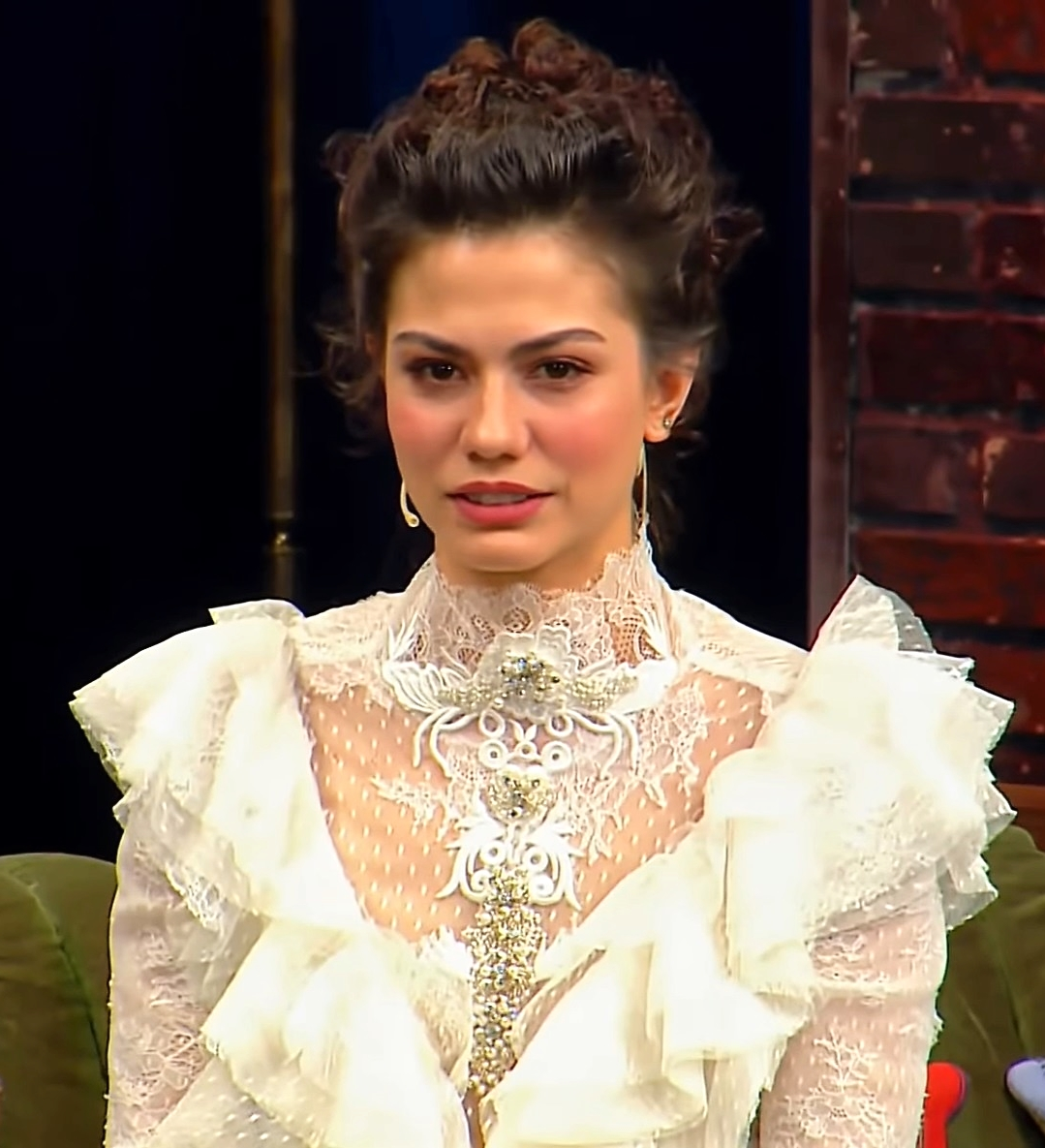
- Özdemir in 2018
- Born: 26 February 1992 (age 34); İzmit, Turkey
- Occupation: Actress
- Years active: 2013–present
- Spouse: Oğuzhan Koç (m. 2022; div. 2023)

Demet Özdemir (born 26 February 1992) is a Turkish actress and former dancer. She rose to international prominence with the romantic comedy television series Erkenci Kuş (2018–2019), which was broadcast internationally and contributed to the growing global popularity of Turkish television dramas. She has since starred in television dramas and streaming productions, including the Netflix film Love Tactics (2022) and Disney + miniseries Between the World and Us (Dunyayla Benim Aramda) (2022).

== Personal life ==
Özdemir was born on 26 February 1992 in İzmit, Kocaeli, and is the youngest of three children. She is of Bulgarian Turkish descent. Following her parents' separation, she moved to Istanbul with her mother and siblings.

On 28 August 2022, she married musician and actor Oğuzhan Koç. They divorced on 8 May 2023.

== Dance career ==
Özdemir began her career as a dancer at the age of 16, working while continuing her studies to support her family. She worked as a backup dancer for singer Bengü and later joined the dance group Efes Kızları. She appeared in music videos for Mustafa Sandal ("Ateş Et ve Unut") and Bengü ("Hodri Meydan").

== Acting career ==
=== Early career (2013–2017) ===
Özdemir studied acting at Şahika Tekand Studio for two years (between 2011 and 2013).

Özdemir made her acting debut in the 2013 fantasy series Sana Bir Sır Vereceğim alongside Ekin Koç, playing the Aylin.

She later appeared as a supporting character, Alya, in the historical series Kurt Seyit ve Şura (2014). She appeared as Demet in the movie Tut Sözünü. In 2015, she had her first leading role in the romantic comedy series Çilek Kokusu.

Between 2016 and 2017, she starred in No 309, one of her first long-running leading roles in a romantic comedy format. It ended on 25 October 2017 with 65 episodes.

In 2017 she played in the dance-comedy film Sen Kiminle Dans Ediyorsun written by Burak Aksak, writer of the hit surreal comedy Leyla ile Mecnun.

=== Breakthrough and international success (2018–2019) ===
From 2018 to 2019, Özdemir starred as Sanem Aydın in the romantic comedy series Erkenci Kuş, opposite Can Yaman. The role marked her breakthrough as a leading actress in Turkish television. The series was broadcast internationally and contributed to the wider distribution of Turkish television dramas. Her performance earned her several awards, including Best Actress award at Murex d'Or in Lebanon. The series achieved notable popularity in Italy, where it aired daily on the national broadcaster Canale 5 and was later scheduled in prime-time slots following its success. Also, Pájaro soñador (Erkenci Kuş) became the first Turkish romantic comedy broadcast by UniMás in the United States. In Brazil, it stood out as Globoplay's most popular Turkish productions.

She also performed the theme song "Günaydın" ("Good Morning"), composed by Cem Öget.

=== Transition to dramatic roles (2019-2021) ===
From 2019 to 2021, she played the lead role of Zeynep in the drama series Doğduğun Ev Kaderindir, which focused on themes of family and social issues. The series was directed by Çağrı Bayrak. The script was inspired by Gülseren Budayıcıoğlu's novel Camdaki Kız which is based on a true story. The series achieved broad international distribution, being licensed in more than 90 countries worldwide, and was later made available on streaming platforms including HBO Max.

=== Streaming projects (2022–2023) ===
In 2022, Özdemir starred in the Netflix romantic comedy film Love Tactics (Aşk Taktikleri ), which was released internationally. She played the lead role of Aslı Yıldırım alongside actor Şükrü Özyıldız. She also appeared in the internationally released Disney+ drama series Dunyayla Benim Aramda with Bugra Gülsoy, Hafsanur Sancaktutan, Zerrin Tekindor and Metin Akdülger. It follows the character of İlkin (Özdemir) who worries that the love of her life, a famous actor, is no longer in love with her. In 2023 the Netflix film Love tactics 2 (Aşk Taktikleri 2) was released as a sequel to Love Tactics.

=== Projects since 2023 ===
In 2023, she starred in Adım Farah opposite to Engin Akyürek. Adım Farah is adaption of the award-winning Argentinian series La Chica Que Limpia. For her role as Farah, Özdemir was awarded the 2025 PRODU award for Best Actress in a Contemporary Non-Spanish Language Telenovela.

Since March 2025, she has been portraying the lead character Nisan Akyol alongside Çağatay Ulusoy (Eşref Tek) in the TV series Eşref Rüya. The character Nisan Akyol is a singer and because of that Özdemir has performed several songs in the series, including "Aşiyan" (lyrics and composition by Afra, arrangement by Mustafa Ceceli). Özdemir together with singer Afra released the song "Şimdi Böyle Biriymiş" (lyrics and composition by Afra, arrangement by Mustafa Ceceli).

On 18 September 2025, Özdemir released a single "Ah Yar" by Tiizz Records with lyrics and music by Zeynep Melisa Gülen, arrangement by Mustafa Ceceli. On 2 January 2026 Özdemir released a single "Gözü Kara" by Tiizz Records & Demet Özdemir with lyrics and music by Zeynep Melisa Gülen, arrangement by Bertin Yıldız and video by Meryem Baburoğlu. She performed the both songs as part of the soundtrack for Eşref Rüya.

In 2026, Özdemir released a cover of "Kime Zarar" as part of Eda & Metin Özülkü Şarkıları, a tribute project celebrating songwriters Eda and Metin Özülkü's 50th anniversary in music, in which around 30 actors recorded new interpretations of the duo's songs.

In 2024, Özdemir appeared as Ceren in Djinn Wedding (Turkish Cinlerin Düğünü), directed by Ferit Karahan. In 2026, the film was selected for the Platform Competition at the Toronto International Film Festival (TIFF), where it is scheduled to have its world premiere.

=== International recognition ===
She received the Best Actress award at the 2019 Murex d’Or Awards for her role in Erkenci Kuş.

In September 2023 Özdemir participated in the 80th edition of the Venice Film Festival where she received the Kinéo Award for Best International Actress for the series Kurt Seyit ve Şura, and the movies Love Tactics and Love Tactics 2.

In November 2024 Özdemir was awarded during the 8th Edition of the Distinctive International Arab Festivals Awards - DIAFA 2024 with an honorary award for her professional career as Best International Actress.

For her role as Farah, Özdemir was awarded the 2025 PRODU award for Best Actress in a Contemporary Non-Spanish Language Telenovela.

== Public image ==
Özdemir has been associated with television, fashion, and advertising campaigns in Turkey and internationally. Between 2019 and 2024, she appeared in campaigns associated with Pantene Turkey and participated in projects related to women's self-confidence and social awareness

She has also presented and hosted in segments of the Pantene Golden Butterfly Awards ceremony, one of Turkey’s major television and music award events.

Following the 2023 Turkey–Syria earthquakes, Özdemir took part in charity and aid initiatives supporting earthquake victims.

Özdemir has appeared in international entertainment and fashion publications, including ''Elle'', ''Madame Arabia'', and Özdemir has appeared in international entertainment and fashion publications, including Elle, Madame Arabia, and No Manners Magazine.

She was part of the jury of the 21st Cinema of the Future Competition (Geleceğin Sineması Yarışması), which was organized with contributions from the Ministry of Culture and Tourism and aims to discover new talents of cinema.

== Filmography ==
Film
Year	Title	Role	Notes
2015	Tut Sözünü	Demet	lead role
2017	Sen Kiminle Dans Ediyorsun	Aysel	lead role
2022	Love Tactics (Aşk Taktikleri)	Asli	Netflix film
2023	Love Tactics 2 (Aşk Taktikleri 2)	Asli	Netflix sequel
2026	Djinn Wedding (Cinlerin Düğünü)	Ceren	Platform Competition, Toronto International Film Festival

Web series
Year	Title	Role	Notes
2022	Between the World and Me (Dünyayla Benim Aramda)	İlkin	lead role, Disney+ series
	Grand Maison İstanbul	Defne	lead role, upcoming Prime Video series

Television
Year	Title	Role	Notes
2013	Sana Bir Sır Vereceğim	Aylin	lead role (29 episodes)
2014	Kurt Seyit ve Şura	Alya	supporting role (21 episodes)
2015	Çilek Kokusu	Aslı	lead role (23 episodes)
2016–2017	No: 309	Lale	lead role (65 episodes)
2018–2019	Erkenci Kuş	Sanem	lead role (51 episodes)
2019–2021	Doğduğun Ev Kaderindir	Zeynep	lead role (43 episodes)
2020	Kırmızı Oda	Zeynep	guest role (1 episode)
2023	Adım Farah	Farah	lead role (27 episodes)
2025-2026	Eşref Rüya	Nisan	lead role (47 episodes)

Theatre
Year	Title	Role	Notes
2018	Tolgshow	guest, improvisation	
2021	Çok Güzel Hareketler 2	guest	

Commercials
Year	Commercial	Role	Notes
2012	Pegasus Hava Yolları	-	
2015	Fresh Company	brand ambassador	
2017	Garnier	brand ambassador	
2018	Turkish Economy Bank platform CERTETEB	Demet Özdemir & Can Yaman	
2019–2024	Pantene Türkiye	brand ambassador	
2019	#ALLFOR1TURKEY dance challenge (in cooperation with Nike)	voluntary supporter	
2021	8th Pink Ball on the Field (8. Pembe Top Sahada)	voluntary supporter	
2022	Disney+ Türkiye	brand ambassador	
2023	ETİ Browni Intense	advertising face	
2023	"Continue Education" charity campaign (FOX and Turkish Education Foundation) (Eğitime Devam Now TV (FOX) ve Türk Eğitim Vakfı)	face of the campaign	
2024–	Konfor Mobilya	brand face	
2026	Trendyolmilla	brand ambassador	
2026	İpana	brand face together with Kerem Bürsin	

TV and YouTube programs
Year	Title	Role	Note
2015, 2017	Beyaz Show	guest	
2016–2017	3 Adam	guest	
2018, 2020	O Ses Türkiye yılbaşı özel	guest	
2019	Umut Yeşerten Şarkılar NTV (Songs That Bring Hope NTV)'	guest	
2020	Verissimo	guest	
2021–2022	Ibrahim Selim ile Bu Gece	guest	
2023	Oğuzhan Uğur'la P!NÇ	guest	
2024	Empati	guest	

As dancer
Year	Artist	Role	Notes
2009	Mustafa Sandal	dancer support	"Ateş Et ve Unut" music video
2012–2013	Efes Kızları	dancer team member	
2016	Bengü	guest star	"Hodri Meydan" music video

== Awards and recognitions ==
Awards
Year	Award	Category	Work	Result	
2014	StarMetre Fan Factor 2 Crystal Awards	Crystal Award	Sana Bir Sır Vereceğim	Won	
2018	45th Golden Butterfly Awards	Best Actress in a Romantic Comedy Series	Erkenci Kuş	Won	
2018	45th Golden Butterfly Awards	Best Romantic Comedy Series	Erkenci Kuş	Won	
2018	Media and Arts Awards	Best TV series couple Demet Özdemir & Can Yaman	Erkenci Kuş	Won	
2018	19th Internet Media Best of the Year Awards	The Best On-Screen Duo of the Year Demet Özdemir & Can Yaman	Erkenci Kuş	Won	
2018	19th Internet Media Best of the Year Awards	Youth Series of the Year	Erkenci Kuş	Won	
2019	Türkiye Youth Awards	Best Female TV Actor	Erkenci Kuş	Won	
2019	Türkiye Youth Awards	Best TV Series	Erkenci Kuş	Won	
2019	Murex d'Or Awards	Best International Actress	Erkenci Kuş	Won	
2019	10th Quality Awards	Best Quality Female Actor	Erkenci Kuş	Won	
2022	48th Golden Butterfly Awards	Best Digital Series	Dünyayla Benim Aramda	Won	
2023	Türkiye Youth Awards	Best Digital Platform Series	Dünyayla Benim Aramda	Won	
2023	Kineo Awards 21st Edition of Venice Biennale	Best International Actress Award	honorary award for her professional career	Won	
2024	8th Edition of the Distinctive International Arab Festivals Awards DIAFA 2024	Best international actress	honorary award for her professional career	Won	
2025	PRODU Awards	Best Actress in a Contemporary Non-Spanish Language Telenovela Award	Adım Farah	Won	.
2025	11th Altin 61 Awards	Most Inspiring Woman of the Year	-	Won	

Nominations
Year	Award	Category	Work	Result
2016	43th Golden Butterfly Awards	Best Comedy Actress	No: 309	Nominated
2018	45th Golden Butterfly Awards	Best Couple (TV Series) Demet Özdemir & Can Yaman	Erkenci Kuş	Nominated
2019	46th Golden Butterfly Awards	Best Actress in a Romantic Comedy Series	Erkenci Kuş	Nominated
2019	46th Golden Butterfly Awards	Best Couple (TV Series) Demet Özdemir & Can Yaman	Erkenci Kuş	Nominated
2020	PRODU Awards	Best Actress in a Foreign Language Series	Doğduğun Ev Kaderindir	Nominated
2022	48th Golden Butterfly Awards	Best TV Actress	Dünyayla Benim Aramda	Nominated
2022	48th Golden Butterfly Awards	Best Couple (TV Series) Demet Özdemir & Buğra Gülsoy	Dünyayla Benim Aramda	Nominated
2023	49th Golden Butterfly Awards	Best Couple (TV Series) Demet Özdemir & Engin Akyürek	Adım Farah	Nominated

== Other honors ==
Other honors

University and student-voted awards

University and student-voted awards
Year	Awarding body	Category	Work	Result	
2017	Gelişim University 6th Media Awards	Best TV Actress of the Year	No: 309	Won	
2024	İKÜ Career Honorary Awards Istanbul Kültür University	Best Actress	Honorary award for her professional career	Won	64
2025	EİK Ödül Sabancı University Economics and Business Club	Best Actress	Honorary award for her professional career	Won	
