= Miss Turkey 2017 =

Beauty pageant edition

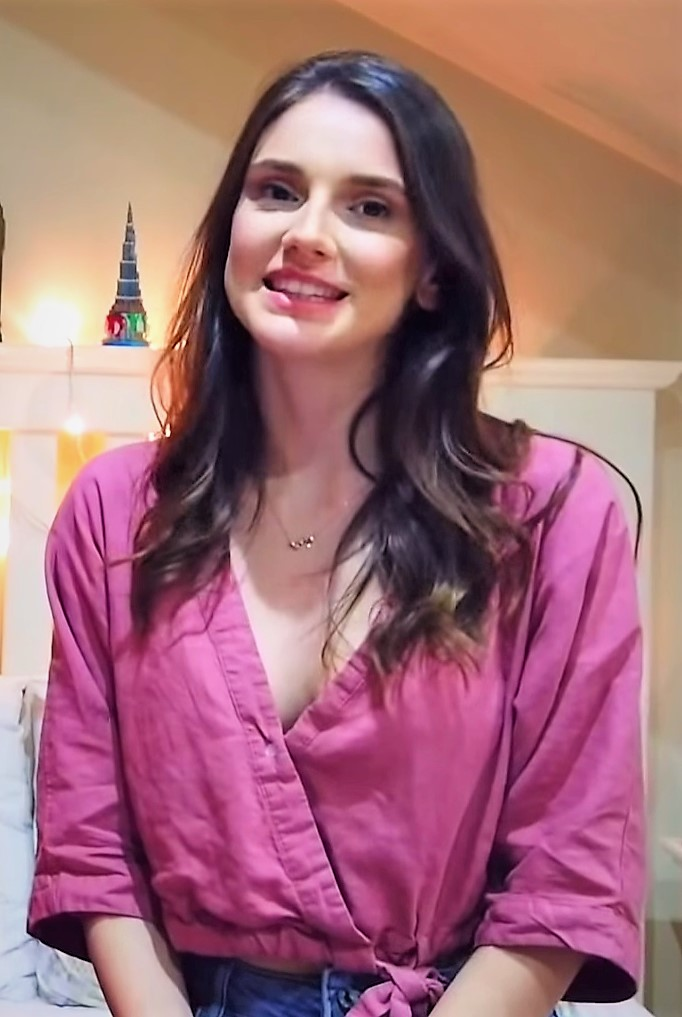
- Aslı Sümen, Miss Turkey 2017, in 2019
- Date: September 21, 2017
- Venue: Grand Hotel de Pera, Istanbul, Turkey
- Broadcaster: 1AN TV
- Entrants: 20
- Placements: 10
- Winner: Itır Esen (Dethroned); Replaced by Aslı Sümen; Istanbul - 1

The Miss Turkey 2017 held on September 21, 2017 in the Grand Hotel de Pera in Istanbul, Turkey concluded with the crowning of Itır Esen as the Miss World Turkey 2017. Miss Turkey organizers said the 18-year-old Itir Esen was dethroned on Friday, a day after she won the contest and the right to represent Turkey at the Miss World contest in China. The organizers said in an emailed statement that her title was revoked because of a tweet in July that they described as unacceptable. Runner-up Asli Sumen will now represent Turkey in China and also Pınar Tartan who was crowned Miss Supranational Turkey 2017 will now compete at Miss Universe 2017 after this dethroned happened.

== Winner and runners-up ==
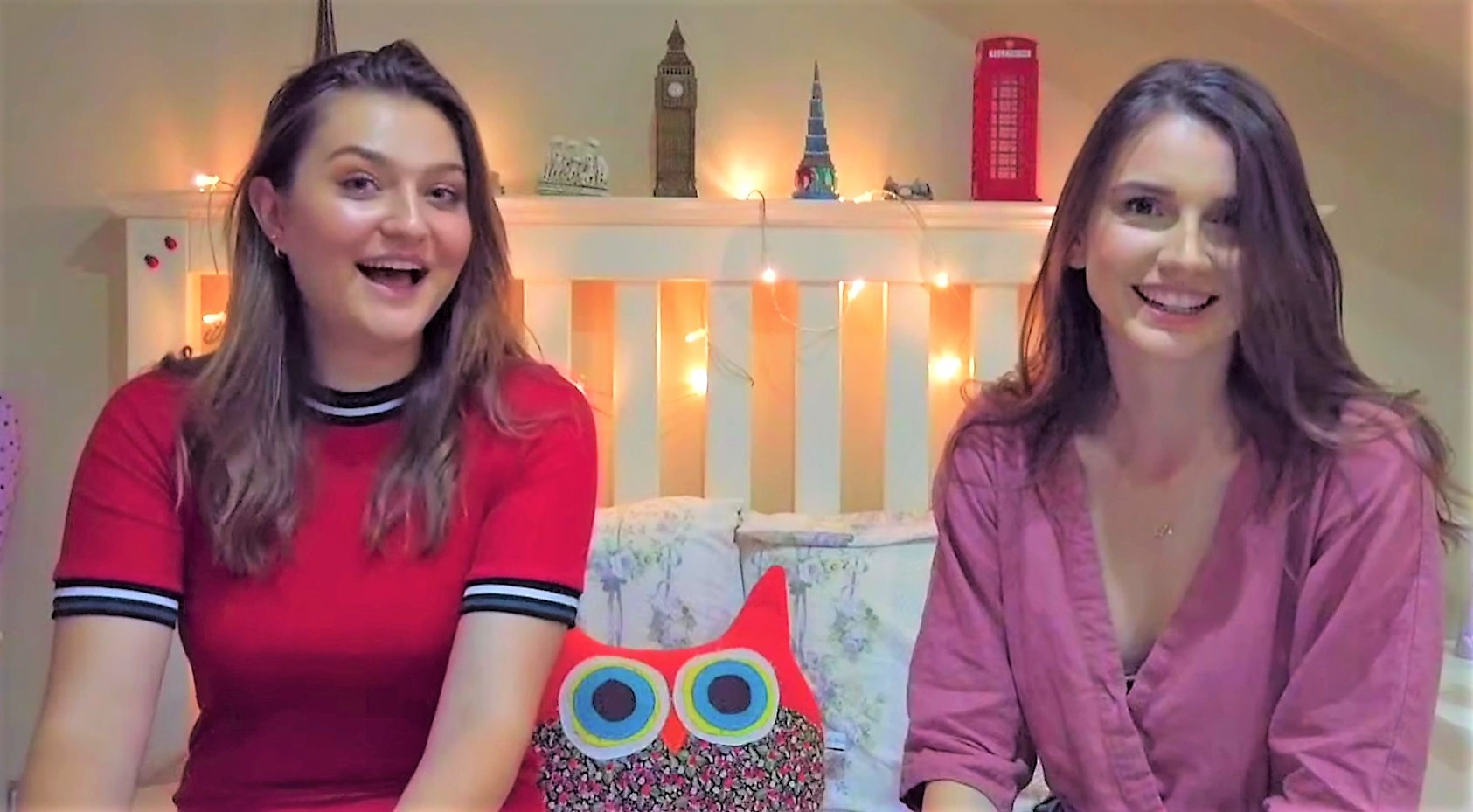
Yasemin Çoklar (left), Miss Turkey Supranational 2017, Aslı Sümen, Miss Turkey 2017, in 2019

Final Results	Contestant
Miss Turkey/ World 2017: (Dethroned)	1 – Itır Esen
Miss Turkey/ Universe 2017: (Assumed Miss Turkey/ World title)	12 – Aslı Sümen
Miss Turkey/ Supranational 2017: (Assumed Miss Turkey/ Universe title)	20 – Pınar Tartan
Top 10	3 – Gözde Baddal; 4 – Özge Türk Yılmaz; 6 – Ceren Baykan; 8 – Beril Altuntaş; 10 – Buse Çekmeceli; 15 – Suna Yıldırım; 19 – Yasemin Çoklar (Assumed Miss Turkey/ Supranational title)

== Contestants ==
The official Top 20 Candidates of Miss Turkey 2017:

No.	Name	Age	Height	Hometown
1	Itır Esen	18	180 cm (5 ft 11 in)	Istanbul
2	Alara Kaya	21	177 cm (5 ft 9 1/2 in)	Istanbul
3	Gözde Baddal	23	177 cm (5 ft 9 1/2 in)	İzmir
4	Özge Türk Yılmaz	21	175 cm (5 ft 9 in)	Istanbul
5	Emire Cansu Kurtaran	21	178 cm (5 ft 10 in)	Bursa
6	Ceren Baykan	20	176 cm (5 ft 9 1/2 in)	Istanbul
7	Ekinsu Kansu	21	177 cm (5 ft 9 1/2 in)	Ankara
8	Beril Altuntaş	18	173 cm (5 ft 8 in)	Giresun
9	Deniz Görgülü	20	173 cm (5 ft 8 in)	Bursa
10	Buse Çekmeceli	21	170 cm (5 ft 7 in)	Istanbul
11	Merve Argun	19	172 cm (5 ft 7 1/2 in)	Istanbul
12	Aslı Sümen	23	173 cm (5 ft 8 in)	Mersin
13	Hazal Karasıkı	21	175 cm (5 ft 9 in)	Balıkesir
14	Bahar Gençalp	20	174 cm (5 ft 8 1/2 in)	Istanbul
15	Suna Yıldırım	23	177 cm (5 ft 9 1/2 in)	Giresun
16	Bahar Merve Zırhlı	20	175 cm (5 ft 9 in)	Istanbul
17	Betül Ekşi	19	180 cm (5 ft 11 in)	Istanbul
18	Andrea Raema Mungiu	20	180 cm (5 ft 11 in)	Istanbul
19	Yasemin Çoklar	19	178 cm (5 ft 10 in)	Istanbul
20	Pınar Tartan	20	183 cm (6 ft 0 in)	İzmir
