= Zeynep Tuğçe Bayat =

Turkish actress (born 1990)

- Born: 8 February 1990 (age 36); Mersin, Turkey
- Occupation: Actress
- Years active: 2009–present
- Spouse: Cansel Elçin (m. 2020)
- Children: 1
- Website: www.zeyneptugcebayat.com

Zeynep Tuğçe Bayat (born 8 February 1990) is a Turkish actress. She is known for her role as "Targun Hatun" in Kuruluş: Osman and in other series such as Afili Aşk, Teşkilat, Baba, and Çilek Kokusu.

== Biography ==
Bayat was born in Mersin. Through generations of her family is nomad Turks in Taurus Mountains. Her surname Bayat is the one of 12 Oğuz tribes . After, she graduated law at Marmara University. She graduated from theatre department of Anadolu University State Conservatory. During her university education, she worked behind the scenes in private theatres, which led to her even winning an award for one of her plays called Closer. She went to Spain to study acting at a higher level after a period of internship. Zeynep went on the TV screens for the first time in a series called Beyaz Gelincik, which was broadcast in 2006 and is now starring in the popular Turkish TV series, Teşkilat. Also, she wrote and played in short series Dünyayı Kurtaran Kadın.

=== Personal life ===
On 24 August 2020, she married the Turkish actor Cansel Elçin. The couple welcomed a son in January 2025.

== Filmography ==
Film
Year	Title	Role	Ref.
2017	Şansımı Seveyim	Yaprak	
2018	Akvaryum	Defne	Short film
2024	Adresi Olmayan Ev	Defne	
Web series
2021	Senkron	Şebnem	
2021	Dünyayı Kurtaran Kadın	Herself	writer, actor
2023	Hür	Banu	
2024–2025	Prens	Caren	
2024	Kimler Geldi, Kimler Geçti	Beliz	
TV series
2006	Beyaz Gelincik	Kız	
2009	Arka Sıradakiler	Öğrenci	
2010–2011	Gönülçelen	Nevra	
2011	Yıldız Masalı	Pelin	
2014	Ah Neriman	Yeşim	
2015	Çilek Kokusu	Gonca	
2016	Seviyor Sevmiyor	Buket	
2019	Afili Aşk	Ceyda Aran	
2020	Kuruluş: Osman	Targun Hatun	
2022	Baba	Şahika Saruhanlı	
2023	Teşkilat		
2024	La Pasión Turca	Tuba	

== Theatre ==
Year	Title	Role	Venue	Notes
2017	The Tempest	Miranda	Moda Sahnesi	Leading role
2018	Closer - Sevgi Neden Yetmez	Alice	İkinci Kat	Leading role

== Discography ==
Year	Single	Notes
2015	Hep O Küçük Şeyler	
2016	Karlar Kraliçes	

== Awards and nominations ==
Year	Awards ceremony	Category	Project	Result	Ref.
2019	7th Ekin Literary Friends Theatre Awards	Best Actress	Closer	Won	
2024	50th Golden Butterfly Awards	Best Actress in a Comedy	Prens	Nominated	
