= Adım Farah =

Turkish television series

- Genre: Drama
- Created by: Deniz Dargı; Cem Görgeç; Cenk Boğatur
- Based on: La Chica que Limpia by Greta Molas
- Directed by: Recai Karagöz
- Starring: Demet Özdemir; Engin Akyürek
- Composer: Aytekin Ataş
- Countries of origin: Turkey and Iran
- Original language: Turkish
- No. of seasons: 2
- No. of episodes: 27

Production
- Producer: Saner Ayar
- Production location: Istanbul
- Cinematography: Veysel Tekşahin
- Camera setup: Single-camera
- Running time: 140 minutes
- Production company: O3 Medya

Original release
- Network: FOX
- Release: March 1 – December 30, 2023

Adım Farah (translated title: My Name is Farah) is a Turkish-Iranian drama television series produced by O3 Medya. The series was set to premiere on March 1, 2023. It is directed by Recai Karagöz and written by Deniz Dargı, Cem Görgeç, and Cenk Boğatur. The show is adapted from the 2017 Argentine TV series La Chica que Limpia. which is also known as The Cleaning Lady. The lead roles are portrayed by Demet Özdemir and Engin Akyürek.

== Plot ==
Drawing inspiration from the highly acclaimed Argentinian series La chica que limpia, this captivating Turkish adaptation centres around Farah (Demet Özdemir), an Iranian woman who escapes her homeland to find solace in Istanbul. Working as a cleaning lady, she works tirelessly to fund her son's vital medical treatment. However, her life takes an unexpected twist when she accidentally becomes a witness to a murder.

=== Season one ===
The story begins with Farah struggling between staying silent or speaking up for justice, while Tahir is faced with deciding the fate of an innocent woman and child for the first time in his life. Farah once again finds herself caught by Tahir, unable to escape her destiny. While saving Ali Galip's life keeps her temporarily safe, she awaits Tahir and Ali Galip's decision regarding her. The decision Ali Galip makes about this woman who saved his life but also threatens his son's life offers Farah a temporary respite, yet an uncertain future lies ahead.

With the news of a donor coming from Tahir, Farah decides to forgo testifying against Mehmet. However, Mehmet has no intention of letting Farah go. After the events, Aga and Tahir engage in a fierce confrontation, leading Tahir into an uncertain period where he must protect Farah and himself. Realizing that Farah's determination cannot be broken easily, Mehmet decides to play a tougher game.

Upon discovering Farah's lie, Tahir experiences a deep disappointment. Thinking that she cannot stay at Tahir's place anymore, Farah prepares to return home but finds Tahir in her way. Although Tahir offers her another chance, Farah cannot deviate from her truth, leading to an inevitable confrontation. With no other choice but to give a statement, Farah's door is unexpectedly knocked by an unforeseen guest to resolve all her problems.

Accepting Ali Galip's order to kill Chief Inspector Mehmet is difficult for Tahir. On the other hand, getting rid of Mehmet will be the key to starting a new life for Tahir. While struggling with this dilemma, Farah also finds herself dealing with entirely different feelings. She realizes that she is starting to fall for Tahir.

The donor's death changes everything. Farah senses that this death wasn't a simple accident. Despite Tahir's efforts to keep it from her, he's determined to find the perpetrator and instigator. Tahir's daring move turns everything upside down. Tahir and Farah are compelled to seek refuge in the more secure AGA house.

Upon hearing about the attack on the vehicle containing Bade and Farah, Mehmet and Tahir rush to the hospital where they've been taken. Farah is in shock over the incident. Bade, on the other hand, undergoes a serious surgery. Tahir's determination to find the attacker and involve him in the larger plan, alongside Bade and Mehmet, falls to Farah to calm him down. However, Tahir has his own plan in mind, involving giving Ali Galip the punishment he believes he deserves.

== Cast and characters ==
- Demet Özdemir as Farah Erşadi
- Engin Akyürek as Tahir Lekesiz
- Feyyaz Duman as Behnam Azadi
- Fırat Tanış as Mehmet Koşaner
- Senan Kara as Vera Akıncı
- Lale Başar as Perihan Koşaner
- Oktay Çubuk as Kaan Akıncı (1-14)
- Mert Doğan as Bekir Akıncı
- Derya Pınar Ak as Gönül Koşaner
- Kemal Burak Alper as İlyas
- Rastin Paknahad (Iranian) as Kerimşah
- Mustafa Avkıran as Ali Galip Akıncı (1-14)
- Alper Türedi as Hamza
- Ali Sürmeli as Orhan Koşaner
- Sera Kutlubey as Merjan

== Overview ==
Season	Episodes	Originally released		
Season	Episodes	First released	Last released	Network
1	14	March 1, 2023	May 31, 2023	FOX
2	13	September 27, 2023	December 30, 2023	FOX

== See also ==
- Television in Turkey
- List of Turkish television series
- Turkish television drama
