= Ruhun Duymaz =

- Genre: Romance; Comedy; Drama
- Written by: Ayşe Üner Kutlu
- Story by: Deniz Dargı; Cem Görgeç; Cenk Boğatur; Ayşe Üner Kutlu
- Directed by: Aytaç Çiçek
- Starring: Şükrü Özyıldız; Burcu Özberk
- Composers: Ercan Saatçi; İlker Yeter
- Country of origin: Turkey
- Original language: Turkish
- No. of seasons: 1
- No. of episodes: 9

Production
- Producer: Saner Ayar
- Production location: Istanbul
- Running time: 120 minutes
- Production company: O3 Medya

Original release
- Network: Fox
- Release: 24 July – 23 September 2023

Ruhun Duymaz (transl. Your Soul Doesn't Hear) ("Love Undercover" is the English name) is aTurkish rom-com drama television series produced by O3 Medya. Created by Aytaç Çiçek, it stars Şükrü Özyıldız and Burcu Özberk as Onur Karasu and Ece Çetinel. It premiered on Fox Turkey on July 24, 2023.

== Plot ==
Onur Karasu is a successful intelligence agent who becomes the head of his department at a young age. His target is Civan Koral, the owner of Turkey's largest jewelry company, who is involved in illegal activities. Onur believes that he keeps incriminating documents about his illegal business at a safe in his house.

In order to gain access to the mansion, Onur fakes a romantic relationship with Hilal, Civan's sister. His focus is get to infiltrate Civan's life and activities. In the process, he meets Ece Cetinel, a skilled thief who ends up working with him on the mission. They end up falling madly in love with each other despite trying to ignore their feelings throughout the operation.

== Cast ==
=== Main ===
- Şükrü Özyıldız as Onur Karasu: a leading agent of MIT; chief of his intelligence team; jewelry maker; Bayhan's son; Ece's boyfriend
- Burcu Özberk as Ece Çetinel: a skilled thief; a gourmet chef; Elif's sister; Onur's girlfriend

=== Recurring ===
- Tuğrul Tülek as Civan Koral: head of the Koral jewelry company; a diamond smuggler; Hilal and Murat's brother; Ece's one-sided lover
- Aslı Sümen as Hilal Koral: a major in business administration; core member of the Koral jewelry company; Civan and Murat's sister; Onur's former fake fiance
- Ülkü Duru as Ayla Karasu: first female agent of MIT; member of Onur's intelligence team; Bayhan's sister; Mufit's fiancée; Onur's aunt
- Şehsuvar Aktaş as Müfit: a jewelry expert; Bayhan's childhood best friend; Ayla's fiancé; Onur's foster parent
- Kadir Polatçı as Ali: an agent in Onur's intelligence team; Melek's love interest
- Ilgaz Kaya as Melek: an agent in Onur's intelligence team; Ali's love interest
- Burak Acar as Melih: an agent in Onur's intelligence team; Melek's one-sided lover
- Mert Oner as Musti: Ece's childhood best friend and foster brother
- Serkan Beşiroğlu as Kadir Turan: a security agent; Civan and Hilal's personal bodyguard
- Gürsu Gür as Murat Koral: Civan and Hilal's brother; Selvi's husband
- Funda Kadıoğlu as Selvi Koral: Murat's wife
- Sena Kalip as Elif Çetinel: Ece's sister; Civan, Hilal, and Murat's adoptive sister
- Emre Özcan as Hazar: a drugs and weapons smuggler; Ece and Musti's foster keeper
- Zuhal Gencer as Handan Koral: Civan, Hilal and Murat's mother; Elif's adoptive mother
- Alper Türedi as Firuz: President of the MIT intelligence agency; Ayla's friend
- Beren Tektas as Young Ece "Mavi" Çetinel: Elif's sister; Musti's best friend
- Ali Cesim Yildiz as Young Musti: Ece's best friend and foster brother
- Yunus Emre Orhan the character Ethem as Hazar's goon

== Episodes ==
No.	Title	Directed by	Written by	Original release date
1	"You'll Never Know"	Aytaç Çiçek	Ayşe Üner Kutlu	July 24, 2023
Onur Karasu, a successful agent, has been pursuing diamond smuggler Civan Koral for months. He fakes a relationship with Civan's sister Hilal to gain access to their house. He maintains a distant relationship with her since he is only pretending to be with her to achieve his goal. Onur's plan to capture Civan hits a snag when he meets Ece, Hilal's friend. Ece is suspicious of Onur and they unknowingly become entangled in his covert operation, causing chaos and upheaval.
2	"Robbery"	Aytaç Çiçek	Rahşan Çiğdem İnan	July 31, 2023
Turns out, Ece is actually a thief. Civan starts falling for Ece thus giving her the opportunity to enter the Koral house and gain information for the operation. Onur and Ece decide to team up.
3	"Pride Escape Plan"	Aytaç Çiçek	Ayşe Üner Kutlu	August 7, 2023
Onur decides to steal the famous diamond necklace of the Kameryan family from the auction organized by the Koral family. His goal is to ruin Civan's prestige, and prevent him from fleeing abroad. While Ece and Onur are planning the heist, Ayla confronts Onur. She warns him about the troubles working with a thief can bring. She also questions him about his blooming feelings for Ece. Onur denies it and maintains they are merely working together for the success of the operation.
4	"Honor Shot"	Aytaç Çiçek	Ayşe Üner Kutlu	August 14, 2023
Ece and Onur successfully steal the valuable Kameryanlar necklace, but Ece accidentally drops it during their attempt to flee. Onur and Ece disguise themselves to retrieve the necklace. Both of them feel drawn to one another in their attempts to fulfill the mission.
5	"Onur Lied to Ece"	Aytaç Çiçek	Ayşe Üner Kutlu	August 21, 2023
Onur saves Ece's life when Hazar's armed men arrive at Ece and Civan's dinner meeting. Civan and Hilal become suspicious of Onur. Ayla is worried about Onur risking the operation and his life for Ece. She warns him that he has a weakness for her. Despite resisting, Onur realizes he can't stop his feelings for Ece. Both Onur and Ece's feelings for one another only grow further as they get to know one another better amidst close proximity.
6	"EcNur couldn't resist love!"	Aytaç Çiçek	Ayşe Üner Kutlu	August 27, 2023
Onur lies to Ece that Elif is not her sister so she doesn't leave the operation and his side. Ece is heartbroken and cries. His conscience is shattered when she hugs and thanks him for his help. Hilal sees them but Onur makes up a story. She is not 100% convinced about Ece's motives so Hilal hires a private detective and asks him to spy on her.
7	"Why Here?"	Aytaç Çiçek	Ayşe Üner Kutlu	September 9, 2023
After Ece and Onur succumb to a kiss during the warehouse mission, their feelings are at an all-time high. They secure evidence against Civan and Onur heads to Bulgaria to catch Hazar. Ayla and Ece rush to the hospital when they find out somebody got injured. Ece is relieved to find out Onur is not hurt.

== Production ==
=== Filming ===
Ruhun Duymaz is filmed in Istanbul, Turkey. It features various iconic locations in Istanbul, including Beşiktaş and Galata.

== Awards and nominations ==
Year	Award	Category	Nominee	Result	Reference
2023	Golden Butterfly Awards	Best Romantic Comedy Actor	Şükrü Özyıldız	Nominated	
2023	Golden Butterfly Awards	Best Romantic Comedy Actress	Burcu Özberk	Nominated	
2023	Golden Butterfly Awards	Best Couple	Şükrü Özyıldız and Burcu Özberk	Nominated	
2023	Golden Butterfly Awards	Best Romantic Comedy Series	Ruhun Duymaz	Nominated	
2023	Golden Butterfly Awards	Best Director	Aytaç Çiçek	Nominated	
2023	Golden Butterfly Awards	Best Screenwriter	Ayşe Üner Kutlu	Nominated	
2023	Altin 61 Ödülleri	Best Romantic Comedy Actor of the Year	Şükrü Özyıldız	TBA	
2023	Altin 61 Ödülleri	Best Romantic Comedy Actress of the Year	Burcu Özberk	TBA	
2023	Altin 61 Ödülleri	Best Couple of the Year	Şükrü Özyıldız and Burcu Özberk	TBA	
2023	Mevcut Bilgi Yilin En'leri Ödülleri	Best Actress of the Year	Burcu Özberk	TBA	
2023	Mevcut Bilgi Yilin En'leri Ödülleri	Best Romantic Comedy Series of the Year	Ruhun Duymaz	TBA	
