= Love Tactics =

- Turkish: Aşk Taktikleri
- Directed by: Emre Kabakuşak
- Written by: Pelin Karamehmetoğlu
- Starring: Demet Özdemir; Şükrü Özyıldız; Deniz Baydar; Özgür Ozan
- Distributed by: Netflix
- Release date: 11 February 2022
- Running time: 98 minutes
- Country: Turkey
- Language: Turkish

Love Tactics (Turkish: Aşk Taktikleri) is a 2022 Turkish film directed by Emre Kabakuşak, written by Pelin Karamehmetoğlu and starring Demet Özdemir, Şükrü Özyıldız, Deniz Baydar and Özgür Ozan. The film was released on 11 February 2022 on Netflix.

== Plot ==
Aslı Yıldırım (Demet Özdemir) is 28 years old and is Glamour brand's chief designer. She also has a blog named Love Tactics where she advises her followers on relationships. One night, one of her followers challenged her to use these tactics to make a guy fall in love with her.

Meanwhile, Kerem Aksoy (Şükrü Özyıldız) is 30 years old and an advertising executive. Kerem loses a potential project to his friend and colleague Tuna. Tuna agrees to give Kerem back his project, but on one condition. Kerem has to make a girl fall in love with him

Aslı and Kerem both accept the challenge and start looking for a potential target at a party with their friends. Coincidentally, they both make each other their targets and do a little flirting with each other using their tactics. The next day they plan to have a "chance encounter" with each other. But they have to attend the same work party unbeknownst to the both of them. In order to avoid a clingy girl, Kerem leaves the party early and Aslı accidentally spills wine on someone and she leaves early too. They both sit in the same cab and decide to go to a fancy restaurant for dinner.

Aslı accidentally leaves her cardigan in the cab and Kerem keeps it seeing it as a window of opportunity. He gets it delivered and both Kerem and Aslı wait for the other to call. Days pass and nothing happens. Kerem and Aslı have to go for work in Cappadocia. They meet again on the airplane. The new partner, Servet, of Aslı's firm takes interest in her making Kerem uncomfortable. Servet's daughter, Meltem, is the same clingy girl Kerem was trying to avoid.

Servet and Meltem take Kerem and Aslı out for dinner. Aslı tries to make Kerem jealous with Servet and Kerem with Meltem. Servet and Meltem both get super drunk and pass out, thanks to Kerem and Aslı. Kerem takes Aslı to an old place in Cappadocia that he used to visit. There Aslı gets to know that Kerem's father died when he was a child. She finds him in a pottery basement and Kerem gives her a small vase and helps her make her own pottery. Kerem then takes her to a hot air balloon ride not knowing that Aslı has a fear of heights. Aslı freaks out but Kerem calms her down and they enjoy the view.

The next morning they leave. Kerem then invites Aslı for dinner at his place. He cooks for her and sets up a projector film in the backyard for Aslı. In the movie, when the main protagonists kiss under the rain, Kerem sets off the sprinklers and they share a passionate kiss. They proceed towards a bedroom. Aslı feels uncomfortable so they talk and she gets to know that Kerem and his mother used to play the piano, but ever since she left he neither has been able to throw out the piano fearing he may be letting her go nor does he let anyone touch it or play it himself fearing he might forgive her.

They continue to talk and eventually speak. Kerem wakes up in the middle of the night to see Aslı playing the piano. They share and kiss and proceed towards the bedroom.

The next day, they both admit to their respective friends that they kissed. Tuna reaches the conclusion that Kerem is in love and he doesn't deny it. Aslı's friend Cansu also states the same when Aslı says that she doesn't want to continue the blog. Her other friend Hande reveals that she got ghosted by a guy a few months back and Kerem was the guy.

On her dinner date with Kerem, Aslı breaks his heart on live and reveals to him about her blog which is seen by Meltem. Since she is obsessed with Kerem, she gets Aslı fired from her job. Kerem is furious and makes her offer Aslı her job back on the condition that he will go to London with her. Aslı turns the offer down. As she is coming out of the office, she is alerted by her and Kerem's friends what happened with Meltem.

She races towards the airport and confesses her love for Kerem on her blog. Kerem sees this while on the airplane. Meanwhile, Aslı buys the flight ticket and gets to the gate, but the ticket she bought is for the next flight. She dodges the security and enters the gate. Kerem read Aslı's blog and is overjoyed and deviates the plane. Kerem and Aslı meet and kiss each other while confessing their feelings. They both get arrested by the security and are escorted out of the airport while laughing at the situation.

== Cast ==
- Demet Özdemir as Aslı
- Şükrü Özyıldız as Kerem
- Deniz Baydar as Cansu
- Özgür Ozan as Servet
- Doğukan Polat as Emir
- Yasemin Yazıcı as Meltem
- Hande Yılmaz as Ezgi
- Atakan Çelik as Tuna
- Muhammad Abdullah as Abdullah
