= Sena Kalıp =

Turkish actress (born 2000)

- Born: 18 May 2000 (age 26); Istanbul, Turkey
- Education: Özyeğin University
- Occupation: Actress
- Years active: 2023–present

Sena Kalıp (also known as Sena Mia Kalıp; born 18 May 2000) is a Turkish actress.

== Early life and education ==
Kalıp was born in Istanbul, Turkey. She studied industrial engineering at Özyeğin University and received acting training at Akademi 35 Buçuk Sanat Evi.

== Career ==
Kalıp began her acting career in 2023 with the Turkish television series Ruhun Duymaz. In 2024, she appeared in the television drama Bahar. In interviews, Kalıp stated that she joined the production of Bahar after receiving an offer while she was in London and returned to Turkey to participate in the project. She went on to star in the 2026 hit summer series Altı Üstü İstanbul.

== Filmography ==
TV Series
Year	Title	Role
2023	Ruhun Duymaz	Elif
2024-2025	Bahar	Parla
2026-present	Altı Üstü İstanbul	Melek Toprak
