= Janitor (disambiguation) =

A janitor is a person who takes care of a building.

Janitor may also be:

- Janitor fish, Pterygoplichthys
- Janitor Joe, a DOS game
- Janitor Joe, an American noise rock band
- Janitor (Scrubs), a character on the NBC television comedy series Scrubs
- Janitors Of Tomorrow, album released by the band Gas Huffer in 1991
- President (game), a card game sometimes known as "Janitor" where players race to get rid of all their cards
- The New Janitor, comedy from Keystone Studios featuring Charlie Chaplin
- The Janitor, also known as Roger, an antagonist in Little Nightmares
