= Adiós muchachos =

Adiós muchachos may refer to:

- Adiós muchachos (tango), classic tango song by Julio César Sanders and César Felipe Vedani
- Adiós muchachos, 1994 novel by Daniel Chavarría
- Adiós muchachos, political memoir by Sergio Ramírez 1999
- Adiós muchachos (film) 1955
