= The Cleaning Lady (Argentine TV series) =

Argentine drama television series

- Spanish: La chica que limpia
- Genre: TV drama
- Written by: Irene Gissara; Lucas Combina
- Directed by: Lucas Combina
- Country of origin: Argentina
- Original language: Spanish
- No. of seasons: 1
- No. of episodes: 13

Production
- Executive producer: Paolo Suarez
- Running time: 30-minute timeslot
- Production companies: Germina Films; Jaque Content

Original release
- Network: Cine.ar Play
- Release: 21 August 2017

Related
- La Muchacha Que Limpia (2021); The Cleaning Lady (2022) Adım Farah (2023)

La Chica que Limpia, also known in English as The Cleaning Lady, is a Spanish-language Argentine dramatic television show. The television series has been remade as La muchacha que limpia in Mexico,, as The Cleaning Lady in the United States, and a third one, in Turkey, from 2023, titled Adım Farah, translated as: My Name is Farah. It debuted in 2017 on CINE.AR Play, and later aired on Canal 10 Cordoba. The series is composed of 13 episodes for a 30-minute timeslot. The television program won the Martín Fierro de Oro award in 2018.

The show was filmed in Córdoba, Argentina, and stars Antonella Costa as the titular cleaning lady, Rosa.

== Synopsis ==
Single mother Rosa, a cleaning lady, is obsessive about her cleaning method, due to her 7-year-old son Felipe having an immunodeficiency disorder and needing to live in a sterile bubble. Her cleaning method comes to the attention of some of the ruthless gangsters in the city, who start using her as crime cleanup. She uses the large remuneration of her criminal cleaning jobs to help pay for her son's expensive medical treatments, which also puts her family's safety at risk. The series shows sexual exploitation, drug trafficking, sex trafficking, people trafficking, and does not show the protagonist always choosing the right side.

== Cast of characters ==
Character	Synopsis	Actor	Notes
Rosa	The titular cleaning lady	Antonella Costa	
Felipe	Rosa's immunocompromised son		

== Awards and honours ==
- On 23 June 2018, the TV show won the Martín Fierro Federal de Oro award for televised fiction.

== Legacy ==
- The show was remade for Mexican television as La Muchacha que Limpia, starting airing in 2021.
- The show was remade for American television as The Cleaning Lady, starting airing in 2022.
