= The Cleaning Lady (American TV series) =

American crime drama TV series

- Genre: Crime drama; Serial drama
- Based on: La chica que limpia
- Developed by: Miranda Kwok
- Showrunners: Melissa Carter; Miranda Kwok; Jeannine Renshaw; Daniel Cerone
- Starring: Élodie Yung; Adan Canto; Oliver Hudson; Martha Millan; Sebastien LaSalle; Valentino LaSalle; Sean Lew; Faith Bryant; Eva De Dominici; Naveen Andrews; Kate del Castillo; Santiago Cabrera; Khalen Roman Sanchez
- Music by: Mark Isham; Allison Cantor; Diwa de Leon
- Country of origin: United States
- Original language: English
- No. of seasons: 4
- No. of episodes: 46

Production
- Executive producers: Rose Marie Vega; Paola Suárez; Shay Mitchell; David Dean Portelli; Michael Offer; Miranda Kwok; Melissa Carter; Timothy Busfield; Jeannine Renshaw; Daniel Cerone; Eddie Serrano
- Producers: Stewart Lyons; Joe Lotito; Michael Notarile; Hynndie Wali; Élodie Yung; Suzanne C. Geiger
- Cinematography: Marshall Adams; Vanessa Joy Smith; Alan Caudillo; Juergen Heinemann; Ana Amortegui; Paul Elliott
- Editors: Luyen Vu; Diva Magpayo; Dan Downer III; Mats Abbott; Lois Blumenthal; Richard Glazerman; Lane Baker; Joshua Carrillo; Shonnard Hedges; Elena Maganini
- Running time: 43–45 minutes
- Production companies: Shadow Dance Pictures; Fox Entertainment; Warner Bros. Television; Amore+Vita; Laughing Monkeys

Original release
- Network: Fox
- Release: January 3, 2022 – June 3, 2025

The Cleaning Lady is an American crime drama television series developed by Miranda Kwok, based on the 2017 Argentine television series La chica que limpia. The series premiered on Fox on January 3, 2022. It aired for four seasons until June 2025, when the series was canceled.

== Premise ==
The Cleaning Lady centers on Thony De La Rosa, a Cambodian-Filipino former surgeon who is currently working and living in Las Vegas. She is in the US on an expired visa with her five-year-old son Luca, who has a rare and life-threatening medical disorder for which he needs a cutting-edge bone marrow treatment, which is only available in Las Vegas. In order to do so, Thony makes a living as a cleaning service worker alongside her sister-in-law, Fiona. After Thony witnesses a murder and is discovered by Arman Morales, the perpetrator, she is offered a job both as a cleaner and a doctor within Arman's criminal organization that could pay well enough to help her son and her family. As a result, Thony begins living a double life, keeping secrets from her family, while cleaning up crime scenes and evading the law.

== Cast and characters ==
=== Main ===
- Élodie Yung as Thony De La Rosa, formerly a Cambodian-Filipino surgeon in one of Manila's best hospitals, now trapped in Las Vegas as an undocumented immigrant due to her visa expiring. She becomes a cleaner for the mob in order to gain the connections needed to procure treatment for her sick son.
- Adan Canto as Arman Morales (seasons 1–2), a gangster associated with a powerful Armenian crime family operating in Las Vegas. He agrees to protect Thony and help her son in exchange for her services as a cleaner.
- Oliver Hudson as Garrett Miller (seasons 1–2), an FBI agent who goes after Thony in his effort to bring down Arman
- Martha Millan as Fiona De La Rosa, Thony's sister-in-law and closest friend, with whom she and her son live.
- Sebastien and Valentino LaSalle (seasons 1–3) and Khalen Roman Sanchez (season 4) as Luca De La Rosa, Thony's son. He suffers from a rare autoimmune illness that forces Thony to keep him hidden from the outside world to protect him from contagion.
- Sean Lew as Chris, Fiona's son
- Faith Bryant as Jaz, Fiona's daughter
- Eva De Dominici as Nadia Morales (seasons 2–3; recurring season 1), Arman's wife
- Naveen Andrews as Robert Kamdar (season 2)
- Kate del Castillo as Ramona Sanchez (seasons 3–4)
- Santiago Cabrera as Jorge Sanchez (seasons 3–4)

=== Recurring ===
- Navid Negahban as Hayak Barsamian (seasons 1–2), Arman's boss
- Ivan Shaw as Marco De La Rosa (seasons 1–2), Thony's abusive husband and Fiona's brother
- Jay Mohr as Councilman Eric Knight (season 1)
- Liza Weil as ASAC Katherine Russo (seasons 1–3; guest starring season 4), Garrett's boss at the FBI
- Shiva Negar as Isabel Barsamian (season 1; guest starring seasons 2–3), Hayak's daughter
- Chelsea Frei as Maya Campbell (season 2), an informant of Garrett
- Alberto Isaac as Jacinto "Lolo" De La Rosa (seasons 2–3), Fiona's father
- Princess Punzalan as Alma "Lola" De La Rosa (seasons 2–3), Fiona's mother
- K.C. Collins as Tyler Jefferson (season 2), an FBI colleague of Garrett
- Ryan Sands as JD Harris (seasons 2–4), Jaz's father
- JB Tadena as Paolo Belleza (season 3), Fiona's ex-boyfriend in Manila, who is revealed to be Chris's father
- Jacqueline Obradors as Teresa Morales (season 3), Arman's mother
- Jason Manuel Olazabal as Eduardo Morales (season 3), Arman's father
- Clayton Cardenas as Dante (season 3), Ramona's right-hand man
- Brandon Jay McLaren as Jeremy Dolan (season 3), an FBI agent who poses as a handyman in order to spy on Thony
- Alain Uy as Feng (season 4), an associate of the Sin Cara cartel
- Patricia De León as Chiqui (season 4), the prison leader who threatens Ramona
- Brian Norris as Cowboy Hat (season 4), Ramona's enforcer
- Yancey Arias as Neto (season 4), an old associate of Jorge
- Daniel Bonjour as Dr. Dupont (season 4), an attending physician who is Thony's boss at the clinic
- Rita Volk as Hunter Heller (season 4)
- Chau Long as Benny (season 4), the computer hacker that Thony rescued who now works with Fiona
- Robert Cicchini as Joel Herman (season 4), the assistant district attorney who is trying to cut Thony a deal
- John Pyper-Ferguson as Samuel Heller (season 4)

=== Special guest stars ===
- Lou Diamond Phillips as Joe Fabroa (season 1)
- Lea Salonga as Rose (season 4)

== Episodes ==
=== Series overview ===
Season	Episodes	Originally released	
Season	Episodes	First released	Last released
1	10	January 3, 2022	March 14, 2022
2	12	September 19, 2022	December 12, 2022
3	12	March 5, 2024	May 21, 2024
4	12	March 25, 2025	June 3, 2025

=== Season 1 (2022) ===
No. overall	No. in season	Title	Directed by	Written by	Original release date	Prod. code	U.S. viewers (millions)
1	1	"TNT"	Michael Offer	Teleplay by : Miranda Kwok	January 3, 2022	T54.10002	3.65
While working as a cleaning woman, Thony De La Rosa witnesses mobsters killing her friend Theo, who failed to properly fix a cage match. After the mobsters discover her, a desperate Thony offers to erase all evidence of Theo's murder. Impressed, mobster Arman Morales later learns that Thony is an illegal immigrant whose son, Luca, needs expensive medical treatment. He leverages this information to get Thony to work for him as a professional cleaner. Thony's sister-in-law, Fiona, gets a job dealing ecstasy as a casino waitress; Thony objects, and Fiona angrily tells her to leave her house. Arman gets Thony to help him clean Theo's hideout when his body is discovered by the police; Arman's boss then informs him that a bomb has been planted to kill Thony, whom he regards as a liability. Arman eventually rescues her, but the explosion leaves shrapnel embedded in his leg. Thony cleans the wound and forces Arman to accept a new deal: he will protect her and treat her with respect. Meanwhile, Fiona quits her new job. She tells this to Thony, and they reconcile by building a new clean room so Luca can go outside. FBI agents are secretly monitoring Thony.
2	2	"The Lion's Den"	Jon Amiel	Miranda Kwok & Melissa Carter	January 10, 2022	T54.10102	3.28
FBI agent Garrett Miller is investigating Theo's death. Theo was working as an FBI informant and spying on Arman's boss, Hayak, and his illegal weapons operation. Garrett interrogates Thony and Fiona about the night Theo died. Thony denies knowing Arman and his men. However, Garrett, who has seen Thony with them, does not believe her. Fiona tells her son Chris that he was born in the Philippines and is also undocumented, like herself. Arman discovers that some of Hayak's gun shipments have gone missing. Luca becomes sick. Desperate for help, Thony brings him to the private club that Arman and his wife Nadia manage for Hayak. Arman takes Luca to Hayak's doctor, Dr. Sorayan, for treatment. Luca pulls through after receiving treatment for his infection. Hayak learns that Arman had brought Luca to Dr. Sorayan and that Thony is still alive. Before Hayak pulls the trigger to kill her, Thony says that while she was cleaning for Arman, she saw a man secretly unloading something from his trucks. Arman finds and kills the thief. As a reward for her information, Hayak allows Thony to continue working for them.
3	3	"Legacy"	Marisol Adler	Denise Hahn	January 24, 2022	T54.10103	3.22
Luca's recent infection has severely damaged his liver, which disqualifies him from participating in the stem cell treatment trial. He now needs a liver transplant to survive. Garrett tells Thony that he knows that she is lying about not knowing Arman and threatens to deport her unless she becomes his new informant. She initially refuses but after witnessing Arman's violent side, she agrees, in exchange for protection and his promise not to deport her. While helping Nadia at Hayak's daughter's wedding, Thony obtains a list of corrupt politicians and government officials who are working with Hayak. But instead of handing the list over to Garrett, she keeps it to herself. At her wedding reception, Hayak's daughter Isabel reminisces with Arman about their past romance and confesses she only broke off their relationship because her father forced her to. Meanwhile, Fiona consults an immigration lawyer to apply for legal status for her son Chris.
4	4	"Kabayan"	Lisa France	Raf Green	January 31, 2022	T54.10104	3.55
To fix Luca's immune system, Thony and Fiona seek out Joe Fabroa, the one who originally agreed to donate bone marrow to Luca. He says that his estranged daughter signed him up as a donor. He never wanted to be involved, even for fellow Filipinos, and turns down Thony's request. Arman and his assistant Carlos kidnap Joe and try unsuccessfully to force him to agree. Thony asks Arman to let Joe go and personally drives him home. En route, Thony sings a Filipino lullaby to Luca, the same one Joe's wife used to sing to his daughter. Moved by the song and Thony's story about her father, Joe agrees to help Luca. Meanwhile, Garrett asks Thony to secretly record meetings between Arman and corrupt city councilor Eric Knight. When the FBI uses the recordings to execute a search warrant on the apartment of Knight's girlfriend, Arman asks Thony to pose as a maid and steal a laptop with information linking Arman to Knight from there. Thony evades the FBI agents at the apartment but not before losing her Buddha pendant at the scene, which Garrett finds and recognizes as hers.
5	5	"The Icebox"	Milan Cheylov	Eddie Serrano	February 7, 2022	T54.10105	3.32
6	6	"Mother's Mission"	Marie Jamora	Michael Notarile	February 14, 2022	T54.10106	3.12
7	7	"Our Father, Who Art in Vegas"	Ken Biller	Denise Hahn & Celena Cipriaso	February 21, 2022	T54.10107	3.01
8	8	"Full on Gangsta"	Marisol Adler	Raf Green & Charli Engelhorn	February 28, 2022	T54.10108	2.62
9	9	"Coming Home Again"	Steven DePaul	Melissa Carter	March 7, 2022	T54.10109	2.94
Nadia and Arman go into hiding after a failed attempt on Arman's life. Nadia urges Arman to take advantage of the incident to renew their marriage and cut Thony out of their lives. Arman suspects Hayak is behind the attack, even though the latter feigns ignorance when asked. Arman tells Hayak about the $6 million deal he has already arranged, hoping it would tempt Hayak to spare both his and Nadia's lives. Still stuck in Mexico, Thony reluctantly contacts Garrett to help get her back into the US. Without his supervisor's approval, Garrett drives to meet Thony in Mexico. She urges him to leave immediately so she can be reunited with her son. Garrett drives back to the border, with Thony hiding in the trunk of his car. She is discovered and arrested by Homeland Security, however, and now faces criminal charges and deportation. Nadia and Arman return home, only to find Carlos's corpse, delivered in a box as a warning.
10	10	"The Crown"	Milan Cheylov	Miranda Kwok	March 14, 2022	T54.10110	2.75
Arman and Thony come up with a plan to resolve their problems with Hayak and the FBI. With Arman's help, Garrett and the FBI arrest Hayak in the act of selling illegal weapons to Arman's buyer. The FBI confiscates the weapons, but the cryptocurrency used as payment is missing. Garrett realizes too late that Arman had Thony and Fiona, disguised as hotel maids, steal a thumb drive containing the money during the raid. Arman is sent to prison along with Hayak, despite Garrett's earlier promise not to arrest Arman. Thony, now responsible for protecting Arman's assets, purchases a dilapidated building, which she and Fiona intend to use as a front for a back-alley clinic to both provide employment for their friends and treat local residents who don't have insurance, while also selling drugs and laundering the profits. Marco wants Thony and Luca to return to the Philippines with him. When Thony refuses, Marco abducts Luca.

=== Season 2 (2022) ===
No. overall	No. in season	Title	Directed by	Written by	Original release date	Prod. code	U.S. viewers (millions)
11	1	"Sins of the Father"	Milan Cheylov	Melissa Carter	September 19, 2022	T54.10201	2.40
12	2	"Lolo and Lola"	Eric Dean Seaton	Miranda Kwok	September 26, 2022	T54.10202	2.24
13	3	"El Diablo Que Conoces"	TJ Scott	Eddie Serrano	October 3, 2022	T54.10203	2.31
14	4	"Bahala Na"	Marie Jamora	Michael Notarile & Celena Cipriaso	October 10, 2022	T54.10204	2.26
15	5	"The Brit"	Lou Diamond Phillips	Denise Hahn & Ross Knight	October 17, 2022	T54.10205	2.11
16	6	"Paradise Lost"	S. J. Main Muñoz	Jen Klein & Charli Engelhorn	October 24, 2022	T54.10206	2.22
17	7	"Truth or Consequences"	Ben Hernandez Bray	Eddie Serrano & Sophie Hessekiel	November 7, 2022	T54.10207	2.28
18	8	"Spousal Privilege"	Chi-Yoon Chung	Michael Notarile	November 14, 2022	T54.10208	2.07
19	9	"The Ask"	Loren Yaconelli	Denise Hahn	November 28, 2022	T54.10209	2.19
20	10	"Trust"	Tawnia McKiernan	Jen Klein	December 5, 2022	T54.10210	1.54
21	11	"Sanctuary"	Timothy Busfield	Melissa Carter	December 12, 2022	T54.10211	2.09
22	12	"At Long Last"	Milan Cheylov	Miranda Kwok	December 12, 2022	T54.10212	2.09

=== Season 3 (2024) ===
No. overall	No. in season	Title	Directed by	Written by	Original release date	Prod. code	U.S. viewers (millions)
23	1	"Arman"	Timothy Busfield	Miranda Kwok	March 5, 2024	T54.10301	1.83
24	2	"For My Son"	Timothy Busfield	Denise Hahn & Celena Cipriaso	March 12, 2024	T54.10302	1.42
25	3	"El Camino del Diablo"	Batán Silva	Jen Klein & Charli Engelhorn	March 19, 2024	T54.10303	1.50
26	4	"Agua, Fuego, Tierra, Viento"	Batán Silva	Eddie Serrano	March 26, 2024	T54.10304	1.24
27	5	"All of Me"	Melissa Carter	Michael Notarile & Yael Zinkow	April 2, 2024	T54.10305	1.22
28	6	"El Reloj"	Catriona McKenzie	Jeannine Renshaw	April 9, 2024	T54.10306	1.14
29	7	"Velorio"	Timothy Busfield	Jen Klein	April 16, 2024	T54.10307	1.31
30	8	"Know Thy Enemy"	Mo McRae	Eddie Serrano & Charli Engelhorn	April 30, 2024	T54.10308	1.24
31	9	"From the Ashes"	Jennifer Phang	Yael Zinkow & Patrick Emralino	May 7, 2024	T54.10309	1.11
32	10	"Smoke and Mirrors"	Samir Rehem	Denise Hahn	May 14, 2024	T54.10310	1.11
33	11	"Fight or Flight"	Ramaa Mosley	Jeannine Renshaw	May 21, 2024	T54.10311	0.85
34	12	"House of Cards"	Tawnia McKiernan	Miranda Kwok	May 21, 2024	T54.10312	0.85

=== Season 4 (2025) ===
No. overall	No. in season	Title	Directed by	Written by	Original release date	Prod. code	U.S. viewers (millions)
35	1	"My Way"	Timothy Busfield	Daniel Cerone	March 25, 2025	T54.10401	1.30
36	2	"Le Medecin"	Timothy Busfield	Kelli Breslin	April 1, 2025	T54.10402	1.15
37	3	"Mercy"	Romeo Tirone	Eddie Serrano	April 8, 2025	T54.10403	1.00
38	4	"Suspicious Minds"	Melissa Carter	Helen Childress	April 15, 2025	T54.10404	0.97
39	5	"Wrecking Ball"	Lou Diamond Phillips	Thomas Wong	April 22, 2025	T54.10405	1.02
40	6	"Money, Power & Respect"	Alan Caudillo	Joelle Luman	April 29, 2025	T54.10406	1.21
41	7	"Keep the Family Close"	Mo McRae	Kelli Breslin	May 6, 2025	T54.10407	1.10
42	8	"I Heard It Through the Grapevine"	Élodie Yung	Noah Schechter	May 13, 2025	T54.10408	1.00
43	9	"Hearts on Fire"	Ramaa Mosley	Patrick Emralino	May 20, 2025	T54.10409	1.06
44	10	"Queen for a Day"	Lisa Demaine	Helen Childress	May 27, 2025	T54.10410	1.17
45	11	"Killer Queen"	Tawnia McKiernan	Eddie Serrano	June 3, 2025	T54.10411	1.24
46	12	"As Time Goes By"	John Terlesky	Daniel Cerone	June 3, 2025	T54.10412	1.24

== Production ==
=== Development ===
On October 22, 2019, it was announced that Warner Bros. Television Studios had acquired the remake rights to the Spanish-language Argentine television series La Chica Que Limpia and was developing an English-language adaptation for Fox, with a script commitment attached. Miranda Kwok was set to write and develop the series adaptation, with Kwok also attached to executive produce with Melissa Carter and Shay Mitchell. On January 23, 2020, Fox gave the project a pilot order, the first for the network's 2020–21 television season, with Fox Entertainment and Warner Bros. Television Studios set as co-production partners. The series was ultimately pushed back to the 2021–22 television season due to the COVID-19 pandemic, with Fox giving a series greenlight consisting of ten hour-long episodes on May 7, 2021. Carter was set as showrunner and executive producer along with Kwok, and Michael Offer was also announced as director and executive producer of the pilot. On May 17, 2021, during Fox's Upfront presentation, it was confirmed the series would premiere as a midseason entry during the 2021–22 television season.

On April 7, 2022, Fox renewed the series for a second season. On August 25, 2022, it was reported that Kwok was promoted to showrunner, alongside Carter, for the second season. On February 1, 2023, Fox renewed the series for a third season, and Jeannine Renshaw joined as an executive producer and co-showrunner. The series was renewed for a 12-episode fourth season on May 12, 2024, with a new showrunner to be announced. On July 10, 2024, Daniel Cerone joined the series as an executive producer and the new showrunner for the fourth season. On June 6, 2025, the series was canceled after four seasons.

=== Casting ===
In March 2020, Shannyn Sossamon, Adan Canto, Ginger Gonzaga, and Vincent Piazza were cast in main roles for the pilot. However, Sossamon exited the project after the pilot's initial table read. On April 6, 2020, Élodie Yung was cast to replace Sossamon in the lead role. It was announced that the ethnicity of Yung's character would be changed to match Yung's Cambodian background, but that aspects of Filipino culture would still be integrated. On July 2, 2020, Fox extended the cast options for the pilot through September 30, with the previous option having expired on June 30. Due to the pandemic, cast options were extended further on October 2, 2020. Upon the series order announcement, it was publicized that Martha Millan had replaced Gonzaga in the series and that Piazza had dropped out. In addition, twins Sebastien and Valentino LaSalle were also cast in a shared starring role. On July 13, 2021, Oliver Hudson was cast to replace Piazza. On September 21, 2021, Shiva Negar and Jay Mohr joined the cast in recurring roles. On December 14, 2021, Liza Weil and Eva De Dominici were cast in recurring capacities. In August 2022, De Dominici was promoted to a series regular, while Chelsea Frei was cast in a recurring role and Naveen Andrews joined as a series regular for the second season. On September 27, 2022, K.C. Collins joined the cast in a recurring role for the second season. In December 2023, Kate del Castillo, Santiago Cabrera, and Clayton Cardenas were cast as new series regulars for the third season. The same month, Jacqueline Obradors and Jason Manuel Olazabal joined the cast in recurring roles for the third season. Canto died on January 8, 2024, at the age of 42, from appendix cancer. On January 31, 2024, Brandon Jay McLaren and JB Tadena were cast in recurring capacities for the third season. On November 11, 2024, Yancey Arias joined the cast in a recurring role, while Khalen Roman Sanchez came onboard as a new series regular in a recasting, replacing the LaSalle twins for the fourth season. On November 25, 2024, Daniel Bonjour and Alain Uy were cast in recurring capacities for the fourth season. On March 18, 2025, Patricia De León and Robert Cicchini joined the cast in recurring roles, while Lea Salonga joined as a guest star for the fourth season.

=== Filming ===
The pilot originally started filming on March 10, 2020, in New Mexico, but production was suspended three days later due to the COVID-19 pandemic. By July 2020, Fox had committed to filming the pilot alongside the network's five other pilots ordered for the 2020–21 television season, with production set to resume that summer. However, filming was delayed again to October 5, 2020, and again to February 2021.

== Broadcast ==
The first season of The Cleaning Lady premiered on January 3, 2022, and concluded on March 14, 2022, on Fox. The second season debuted on September 19, 2022, and concluded on December 12, 2022. The third season premiered on March 5, 2024, and concluded on May 21, 2024. The fourth season premiered on March 25, 2025. The series is available to stream on Max.

== Reception ==
=== Critical response ===
The review aggregator website Rotten Tomatoes reported a 60% approval rating based on 15 critic reviews, with an average rating of 6.8/10. The website's critics consensus reads, "Elodie Yung is winning as a resourceful protagonist in over her head, but The Cleaning Lady needs to polish its clichés into something more substantial if it wants to truly sparkle." Metacritic, which uses a weighted average, assigned a score of 53 out of 100 based on 9 critics, indicating "mixed or average reviews".

=== Ratings ===
==== Overall ====
Viewership and ratings per season of The Cleaning Lady
Season	Timeslot (ET)	Episodes	First aired		Last aired		TV season
Season	Timeslot (ET)	Episodes	Date	Viewers (millions)	Date	Viewers (millions)	TV season
1	Monday 9:00 p.m.	10	January 3, 2022	3.65	March 14, 2022	2.75	2021–22
2	Monday 9:00 p.m. (1–10, 12); Monday 8:00 p.m. (11)	12	September 19, 2022	2.40	December 12, 2022	2.09	2022–23
3	Tuesday 8:00 p.m.	12	March 5, 2024	1.83	May 21, 2024	0.85	2023–24
4	Tuesday 8:00 p.m. (1–11); Tuesday 9:00 p.m. (12)	12	March 25, 2025	1.30	June 3, 2025	1.24	2024–25

==== Season 1 ====
Viewership and ratings per episode of The Cleaning Lady
No.	Title	Air date	Rating (18–49)	Viewers (millions)	DVR (18–49)	DVR viewers (millions)	Total (18–49)	Total viewers (millions)
1	"TNT"	January 3, 2022	0.5	3.65	0.2	1.53	0.7	5.18 (Note: Live+7 ratings were unavailable, so Live+3 ratings have been used instead.)
2	"The Lion's Den"	January 10, 2022	0.5	3.28	—N/a	—N/a	—N/a	—N/a
3	"Legacy"	January 24, 2022	0.5	3.22	0.2	1.85	0.8	5.02
4	"Kabayan"	January 31, 2022	0.7	3.55	—N/a	—N/a	—N/a	—N/a
5	"The Icebox"	February 7, 2022	0.5	3.32	—N/a	—N/a	—N/a	—N/a
6	"Mother's Mission"	February 14, 2022	0.4	3.12	—N/a	—N/a	—N/a	—N/a
7	"Our Father, Who Art in Vegas"	February 21, 2022	0.4	3.01	—N/a	—N/a	—N/a	—N/a
8	"Full on Gangsta"	February 28, 2022	0.4	2.62	0.2	1.54	0.6	4.16
9	"Coming Home Again"	March 7, 2022	0.4	2.94	0.3	1.82	0.7	4.76
10	"The Crown"	March 14, 2022	0.4	2.75	0.2	1.90	0.6	4.66

==== Season 2 ====
Viewership and ratings per episode of The Cleaning Lady
No.	Title	Air date	Rating (18–49)	Viewers (millions)	DVR (18–49)	DVR viewers (millions)	Total (18–49)	Total viewers (millions)
1	"Sins of the Father"	September 19, 2022	0.4	2.40	0.2	1.48	0.5	3.79
2	"Lolo and Lola"	September 26, 2022	0.3	2.24	0.2	1.46	0.5	3.70
3	"El Diablo Que Conoces"	October 3, 2022	0.4	2.31	0.2	1.60	0.5	4.00
4	"Bahala Na"	October 10, 2022	0.4	2.26	0.2	1.34	0.5	3.56
5	"The Brit"	October 17, 2022	0.3	2.11	0.2	1.38	0.5	3.49
6	"Paradise Lost"	October 24, 2022	0.3	2.22	0.2	1.30	0.5	3.52
7	"Truth or Consequences"	November 7, 2022	0.3	2.28	0.2	1.45	0.5	3.73
8	"Spousal Privilege"	November 14, 2022	0.3	2.07	0.2	1.30	0.4	3.38
9	"The Ask"	November 28, 2022	0.3	2.19	—N/a	—N/a	—N/a	—N/a
10	"Trust"	December 5, 2022	0.2	1.54	—N/a	—N/a	—N/a	—N/a
11	"Sanctuary"	December 12, 2022	0.3	2.09	—N/a	—N/a	—N/a	—N/a
12	"At Long Last"	December 12, 2022	0.3	2.09	—N/a	—N/a	—N/a	—N/a

==== Season 3 ====
Viewership and ratings per episode of The Cleaning Lady
No.	Title	Air date	Rating (18–49)	Viewers (millions)
1	"Arman"	March 5, 2024	0.2	1.83
2	"For My Son"	March 12, 2024	0.2	1.42
3	"El Camino del Diablo"	March 19, 2024	0.2	1.50
4	"Agua, Fuego, Tierra, Viento"	March 26, 2024	0.2	1.24
5	"All of Me"	April 2, 2024	0.2	1.22
6	"El Reloj"	April 9, 2024	0.1	1.14
7	"Velorio"	April 16, 2024	0.2	1.31
8	"Know Thy Enemy"	April 30, 2024	0.2	1.24
9	"From the Ashes"	May 7, 2024	0.1	1.11
10	"Smoke and Mirrors"	May 14, 2024	0.2	1.11
11–12	"Fight or Flight / House of Cards"	May 21, 2024	0.1	0.85

==== Season 4 ====
Viewership and ratings per episode of The Cleaning Lady
No.	Title	Air date	Rating (18–49)	Viewers (millions)
1	"My Way"	March 25, 2025	0.2	1.30
2	"Le Medecin"	April 1, 2025	0.1	1.15
3	"Mercy"	April 8, 2025	0.1	1.00
4	"Suspicious Minds"	April 15, 2025	0.1	0.97
5	"Wrecking Ball"	April 22, 2025	0.1	1.02
6	"Money, Power & Respect"	April 29, 2025	0.2	1.21
7	"Keep the Family Close"	May 6, 2025	0.1	1.10
8	"I Heard It Through the Grapevine"	May 13, 2025	0.1	1.00
9	"Hearts on Fire"	May 20, 2025	0.2	1.06
10	"Queen for a Day"	May 27, 2025	0.1	1.17
11	"Killer Queen"	June 3, 2025	0.2	1.24
12	"As Time Goes By"	June 3, 2025	0.2	1.24

== Sexual abuse charges ==
In January 2026, an arrest warrant was issued against Timothy Busfield for sexually abusing twin boys he met on the set of The Cleaning Lady (the LaSalle twins). The accusers stated that the abuse occurred while the show was still airing from November 2022 to early 2024, with the alleged abuse also first being reported in November 2024, just after their roles were recast. New Mexico judge Joseph Montano dismissed the charges against Busfield October 16, 2026, citing prosecutorial partiality during the Grand Jury proceedings to obtain the indictment, particularly with respect to procedural instructions provided to the jurors. The judge's order does not prevent the prosecution from filing another case against Busfield.
