= Black Cloud (disambiguation) =

Black Cloud is a 2004 American drama film, which was directed, and written, by Rick Schroder, and starring Eddie Spears, Julia Jones, Russel Means, and Tim McGraw.

Black Cloud may refer to:

== Books ==
- The Black Cloud, a 1957 a science fiction novel by British astrophysicist Fred Hoyle
- Black Cloud, a 2017–2018 comic book series published by Image Comics
- Black Cloud, a story collection by Juliet Escoria
- Black Cloud: The Deadly Hurricane of 1928, by Eliot Kleinberg
- Pierrot the Clownfish: The Black Cloud, by Franck Le Calvez

== Music ==
=== Albums ===
- Black Cloud, album by Davina and the Vagabonds, 2011
- David Bazan's Black Cloud, working title for an album by David Bazan
- Black Cloud, mixtape album by Hell Rell

=== Songs ===
- "Black Cloud", a song by The Amity Affliction from the album Misery
- "Black Cloud", a song by The Choir from the album Love Songs and Prayers: A Retrospective
- "Black Cloud", a song by Converge from the album You Fail Me
- "Black Cloud", a song by Crazy Town from the album The Gift of Game
- "Black Cloud", a song by DJ Format from the album If You Can't Join 'Em... Beat 'Em
- "Black Cloud", a song by Erra from the album Silence Outlives the Earth
- "Black Cloud", a song by Flotsam and Jetsam from the album The Cold
- "Black Cloud", a song by Honeyblood
- "Black Cloud", a song by Leroy Van Dyke
- "Black Cloud", a song by Louis Armstrong from the album Louis 'Country & Western' Armstrong
- "Black Cloud", a song by Morrissey on the album Years of Refusal
- "Black Cloud", a song by Onion from the album Made from Plate
- "Black Cloud", a song by Operator from the album Soulcrusher
- "Black Cloud", a song by Pink Floyd keyboard player Richard Wright on the 1996 album Broken China
- "Black Cloud", a song by SNFU from the album If You Swear, You'll Catch No Fish
- "Black Cloud", a song by Trapeze from the album Welcome to the Real World
- "Black Cloud", a song produced by Megaman & Zalezy from the compilation mixtape album Mood Muzik 4: A Turn 4 the Worst
- “Black Cloud”, a song by Nottingham band The Chase in 2021.

=== Other music ===
- Black Cloud Music, an American independent music label based in San Bernardino, California
- Black Cloud Collective, former name for Hell or Highwater, music side project by Brandon Saller

== Film ==
- Karmegham, English title Black Cloud, a 2002 Tamil drama film directed by S. P. Rajkumar

== Characters ==
- Black Cloud, as part of the Navajo creation story Diné Bahaneʼ
- Black Cloud, a character from the 1932 film My Pal, the King, portrayed by Jim Thorpe
- Black Cloud, a character from the 1953 Western film Last of the Comanches
- Black Cloud, a character from the 1955–56 television series Brave Eagle, portrayed by Pat Hogan
- Black Cloud, a character from the 1956 Western film Comanche
- Black Cloud, an organization in the animated television series MetaJets

== Other uses ==
- Black Cloud, or Software Defined Perimeter (SDP), an approach to computer security
- Karabulut, Turkish proper noun for Black Cloud
- Black Cloud Trail, a climbing trail on Mount Elbert
- Black Cloud mine, in the Leadville mining district
- Black Cloud, the title for the 2019 edition of the Kyiv Biennial
- Black Cloud Project, exhibition by Vibha Galhotra
- Black Cloud, exhibition by Carlos Amorales
- "The Black Cloud", an episode from the animated television series Fantaghirò

== See also ==
- Black Clouds (disambiguation)
- Cloud, an atmospheric phenomenon
- Dark Cloud (disambiguation)
- List of cloud types
