= Finding Nemo =

2003 film by Andrew Stanton

- Theatrical release poster
- Directed by: Andrew Stanton
- Screenplay by: Andrew Stanton; Bob Peterson; David Reynolds
- Story by: Andrew Stanton
- Produced by: Graham Walters
- Starring: Albert Brooks; Ellen DeGeneres; Alexander Gould; Willem Dafoe; Geoffrey Rush
- Cinematography: Sharon Calahan; Jeremy Lasky
- Edited by: David Ian Salter
- Music by: Thomas Newman
- Production company: Pixar Animation Studios
- Distributed by: Buena Vista Pictures Distribution (Note: Distributed under the Walt Disney Pictures banner.)
- Release dates: May 18, 2003 (Los Angeles); May 30, 2003 (United States)
- Running time: 100 minutes
- Country: United States
- Language: English
- Budget: $94 million
- Box office: $940.3 million

Finding Nemo is a 2003 American animated comedy-drama film directed by Andrew Stanton, who co-wrote it with Bob Peterson and David Reynolds. Produced by Pixar Animation Studios for Walt Disney Pictures, the film stars the voices of Albert Brooks, Ellen DeGeneres, Alexander Gould, Willem Dafoe, and Geoffrey Rush. It tells the story of an overprotective clownfish (Note: resembling an ocellaris or orange clownfish) named Marlin (Brooks) who, along with a forgetful regal blue tang named Dory (DeGeneres), finds for his long-lost son Nemo (Gould). Along the way, Marlin learns to take risks and comes to terms with Nemo taking care of himself.

Pre-production of the film began in 1997. The inspiration for Finding Nemo sprang from multiple experiences, going back to Stanton's childhood, when he loved going to the dentist to see the fish tank, assuming that the fish were from the ocean and wanted to go home. To ensure that the movements of the fish in the film were believable, the animators took a crash course in fish biology and oceanography. Thomas Newman composed the score for the film.

First premiering at the El Capitan Theatre in Los Angeles on May 18, Finding Nemo was released in theaters in the United States on May 30. Upon its release, it received widespread acclaim from critics, who praised the visual elements, screenplay, animation, Newman's score and characters who have been cited as entertaining to both children and adult moviegoers. It became the highest-grossing animated film at the time of its release, and the second-highest-grossing film of 2003, as well as the seventh-highest-grossing film overall at the time of its release, earning a total of $871 million worldwide by the end of its initial theatrical run. The film received four nominations at the 76th Academy Awards, and won the award for Best Animated Feature, becoming the first Pixar and Disney film to do so. In 2008, the American Film Institute named it as the 10th greatest American animated film as part of their 10 Top 10 lists. Since then, it has been widely regarded as one of the greatest animated films of all time.

Finding Nemo is the best-selling DVD title of all time, with over 40 million copies sold as of 2006, and was the highest-grossing G-rated film of all time before Pixar's own Toy Story 3 overtook it in 2010. The film was re-released in 3D in 2012. A sequel, Finding Dory, was released in June 2016.

== Plot ==
Marlin and Coral, a clownfish couple who are waiting for their eggs to hatch, live on the edge of the Great Barrier Reef. After a barracuda knocks Marlin unconscious, Marlin awakens to find Coral and all but one of the eggs devoured. Marlin names the surviving child Nemo and vows to keep him safe.

Years later, Marlin and Nemo live in a secluded sea anemone. Nemo is eager to start school and explore the outside world; however Marlin remains anxious and hyperprotective of his son. While dropping Nemo off at school, Marlin warns the teacher of Nemo's deformed pelvic fin. After discovering Nemo's class will be visiting the "drop-off", where the reef meets the open sea, Marlin panics and tries to withdraw Nemo from school. Nemo defiantly swims to a nearby speedboat to prove his independence and is captured by a pair of scuba divers.

Marlin frantically races after the boat, disappearing into the horizon. He meets Dory, a blue tang with short-term memory loss who offers to help him locate his son. The pair encounter Bruce, a great white shark who is part of a support group of sharks trying to abstain from eating fish. At the meeting, Marlin finds a diver's mask from the boat with an address written on it. When Marlin accidentally injures Dory, Bruce smells her blood and relapses into a rampage that sets off old naval mines. As they escape, Dory recalls that she can read the address.

Meanwhile, Nemo is placed in a fish tank in dentist Philip Sherman's office in Sydney. He meets the "Tank Gang", led by Gill, a scarred Moorish idol and consisting of Peach the Sea Star, Deb the striped damselfish, Gurgle the royal gramma, Bloat the pufferfish, Bubbles the yellow tang, and Jacques the cleaner shrimp. They inform him that Sherman plans to gift Nemo to his hyperactive niece, Darla, who has an infamous history of killing her pet fish. To prevent this, Gill hatches an escape plan: Nemo, the smallest of the gang, will clog the tank's filter, forcing Sherman to clean it and bag the fish. Then, they can roll their bags out of the window and into the harbour. Nemo attempts the plan but is nearly killed by the filter's machinery in the process, causing Gill to feel deeply regretful.

Dory accidentally drops the mask into an abyss and encourages Marlin to help her search for it. They find the mask but are attacked by an anglerfish. Dory exploits the anglerfish's light to read the address while Marlin traps the anglerfish with the mask. Their victory boosts Marlin's confidence and helps Dory remember the address. Marlin tries to continue his search without Dory until she convinces a school of moonfish to give them directions to the East Australian Current. On their way, Marlin and Dory become trapped in a forest of jellyfish. While trying to escape, they are both stung and fall unconscious.

Marlin and Dory awaken in the East Australian Current with a large group of sea turtles, including Crush and his son, Squirt. Crush teaches Marlin to relax and be less worried about Nemo. News of Marlin's journey spreads across the ocean and reaches Nigel, a pelican who regularly converses with the Tank Gang. Nigel informs Nemo of Marlin's efforts; inspired, Nemo successfully clogs the filter and the tank quickly becomes covered in green algae. However, this plan is foiled due to the dentist cleaning the tank while the fish sleep and installing a newer filtration system.

After leaving the current, Marlin and Dory become lost and are consumed by a blue whale. Marlin fears the worst, but Dory urges him to trust the whale, which safely expels them through its blowhole into Sydney Harbour. Nigel rescues Marlin and Dory from a flock of seagulls and delivers them to Sherman's office, where they see Nemo playing dead to fake out Darla. Sherman forces Nigel out and Gill helps Nemo escape down the sink drain and into the harbour.

Believing Nemo is genuinely dead, Marlin says goodbye to Dory and leaves, but Dory soon finds Nemo and reunites them. A fishing trawler captures Dory and a school of groupers. Nemo persuades Marlin to let him swim into the net and lead the groupers down; the fish in turn break the trawler, freeing Dory. Marlin praises Nemo's bravery and tells him about his own journey.

Weeks later, Marlin drops Nemo off at school, and Dory arrives shortly afterward. Nemo and Marlin share a warm hug before Marlin waves goodbye to Nemo and tells him to "go have an adventure".

In a pre-credits scene, Gill and the Tank Gang manage to finally escape the tank after breaking the new filtration system. After they fall into the harbour, still in their bags, Bloat asks what they should do next.

== Voice cast ==
- Albert Brooks as Marlin, a clownfish and Nemo's overprotective father.
- Ellen DeGeneres as Dory, a regal blue tang with short-term memory loss.
- Alexander Gould as Nemo, Marlin's only surviving son, who is excited about life and exploring the ocean, but gets captured and domesticated as a pet.
- Willem Dafoe as Gill, a scarred Moorish idol fish living in an aquarium in Philip Sherman's dentistry clinic, and the leader of the Tank Gang.
- Brad Garrett as Bloat, the aquarium's pufferfish.
- Allison Janney as Peach, the aquarium's sea star.
- Stephen Root as Bubbles, the aquarium's bubble-obsessed yellow tang fish.
- Austin Pendleton as Gurgle, the aquarium's obsessive-compulsive royal gramma fish.
- Vicki Lewis as Deb, the aquarium's striped damselfish.
  - Lewis is also credited for voicing "Flo", the name Deb gives her reflection that she believes is her twin sister.
- Joe Ranft as Jacques, the aquarium's cleaner shrimp.
- Geoffrey Rush as Nigel, an Australian pelican, who often visits the dentist clinic and is friends with the aquarium fish.
- Andrew Stanton as Crush, a green sea turtle.
- Elizabeth Perkins as Coral, Marlin's wife and Nemo's mother.
- Nicholas Bird as Squirt, Crush's son.
- Bob Peterson as Mr. Ray, a spotted eagle ray and Nemo's schoolteacher.
- Barry Humphries as Bruce, a great white shark, who, despite abstaining from eating fish, continues to fight his instinctive will to eat them; he is also friends with Anchor and Chum.
- Eric Bana as Anchor, a hammerhead shark who is friends with Bruce and Chum.
- Bruce Spence as Chum, a mako shark who is friends with Bruce and Anchor.
- Bill Hunter as Philip Sherman, a dentist who keeps Nemo and the Tank Gang in an aquarium.
- LuLu Ebeling as Darla, Sherman's rambunctious young niece.
- Jordan "Jordy" Ranft as Tad, a butterfly fish fingerling and Nemo's school friend.
- Erica Beck as Pearl, a young flapjack octopus and Nemo's school friend.
- Erik Per Sullivan as Sheldon, a young seahorse, and Nemo's school friend.
- John Ratzenberger as the school of moonfish.

== Production ==
=== Development ===
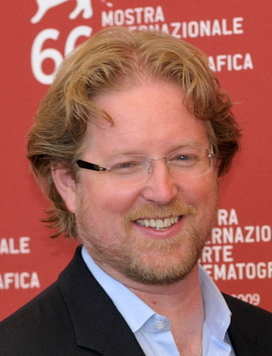
Andrew Stanton wrote and directed the film.

The inspiration for Finding Nemo sprang from multiple experiences, going back to director Andrew Stanton's childhood, when he loved going to the dentist to see the fish tank, assuming that the fish were from the ocean and wanted to go home. In 1992, shortly after his son was born, he and his family took a trip to Marine World. There, after seeing the shark tube and various exhibits, he felt that the underwater world could be done beautifully in computer animation. Later, in 1997, he took his son for a walk in the park but realized that he was overprotecting him and lost an opportunity to have a father-son experience that day.

In an interview with National Geographic magazine, Stanton said that the idea for the characters of Marlin and Nemo came from a photograph of two clownfish peeking out of an anemone:

It was so arresting. I had no idea what kind of fish they were, but I couldn't take my eyes off them. And as an entertainer, the fact that they were called clownfish—it was perfect. There's almost nothing more appealing than these little fish that want to play peekaboo with you.

In addition, clownfish are colorful, but do not tend to come out of an anemone often. For a character who has to go on a dangerous journey, Stanton felt a clownfish was the perfect type of fish for the character. Pre-production of the film began in early 1997. Stanton began writing the screenplay during the post-production of A Bug's Life. As a result, Finding Nemo began production with a complete screenplay, something that co-director Lee Unkrich called "very unusual for an animated film". The artists took scuba diving lessons to study the coral reef.

Stanton originally planned to use flashbacks to reveal how Coral died but realized that by the end of the film there would be nothing to reveal, deciding to show how she died at the beginning of the movie. The character of Gill also was different from the character seen in the final film. In a scene that was eventually deleted, Gill tells Nemo that he's from a place called Bad Luck Bay and that he has brothers and sisters in order to impress the young clownfish, only for the latter to find out that he was lying by listening to a patient reading a children's storybook that shares exactly the same details.

=== Casting ===
William H. Macy was the first actor cast as Marlin. Although Macy had recorded most of the dialogue, Stanton felt that the character needed a lighter touch. Stanton then cast Albert Brooks in the role, and in his opinion, it "saved" the film. Brooks liked the idea of Marlin being this clownfish who isn't funny and recorded outtakes of telling very bad jokes.

The idea for the initiation sequence came from a story conference between Stanton and Bob Peterson while they were driving to record the actors. Although he originally envisioned the character of Dory as male, Stanton was inspired to cast Ellen DeGeneres when he watched an episode of Ellen in which he saw her "change the subject five times before finishing one sentence". The pelican character named Gerald (who in the final film ends up swallowing and choking on Marlin and Dory) was originally a friend of Nigel. They were going to play against each other with Nigel being neat and fastidious and Gerald being scruffy and sloppy. To maintain the film's pace, Gerald's role was minimized after filmmakers struggled to integrate him effectively.

Stanton himself provided the voice of Crush the sea turtle. He originally did the voice for the film's story reel and assumed they would find an actor later. When Stanton's performance became popular in test screenings, he decided to keep his performance in the film. He recorded all his dialogue while lying on a sofa in Unkrich's office. Crush's son Squirt was voiced by Nicholas Bird, the young son of fellow Pixar director Brad Bird. According to Stanton, the elder Bird was playing a tape recording of his young son around the Pixar studios one day. Stanton felt the voice was "this generation's Thumper" and immediately cast Nicholas.

Megan Mullally was originally going to provide a voice in the film. According to Mullally, the producers were stunned to learn that the voice of her character Karen Walker on the television show Will & Grace was not her natural speaking voice. The producers hired her anyway, and then strongly encouraged her to use her Karen Walker voice for the role. When Mullally refused, she was dismissed.

=== Animation ===
To ensure that the movements of the fish in the film were believable, the animators took a crash course in fish biology and oceanography. They visited aquariums, went diving in Hawaii, and received in-house lectures from an ichthyologist. As a result, Pixar's animator for Dory, Gini Cruz Santos, integrated "the fish movement, human movement, and facial expressions to make them look and feel like real characters." Production designer Ralph Eggleston created pastel drawings to give the lighting crew led by Sharon Calahan ideas of how every scene in the film should be lit.

The great white shark, Bruce, is in reference to the animatronic shark used in the Universal Pictures film Jaws (1975). The shark they had used on set was nicknamed "Bruce" after Bruce Ramer, who was Steven Spielberg's lawyer. The line "Here's Brucey!" is a reference to the line "Here's Johnny!" from the 1980 horror film, The Shining, where it's spoken by Jack Nicholson's character Jack Torrance. Additionally, the music that plays for the dentist's niece Darla is Bernard Herrmann's theme music from the 1960 Alfred Hitchcock film, Psycho. The seagulls in the film were modeled after Feathers McGraw in the 1993 Wallace & Gromit short film, The Wrong Trousers.

The film was dedicated to Glenn McQueen, a Pixar animator who died of melanoma in October 2002. Finding Nemo shares many plot elements with Pierrot the Clownfish, a children's book published in 2002, but allegedly conceived in 1995. The author, Franck Le Calvez, sued Disney for infringement of his intellectual rights and to bar Finding Nemo merchandise in France. The judge ruled against him, citing the color differences between Pierrot and Nemo.

=== Localization ===
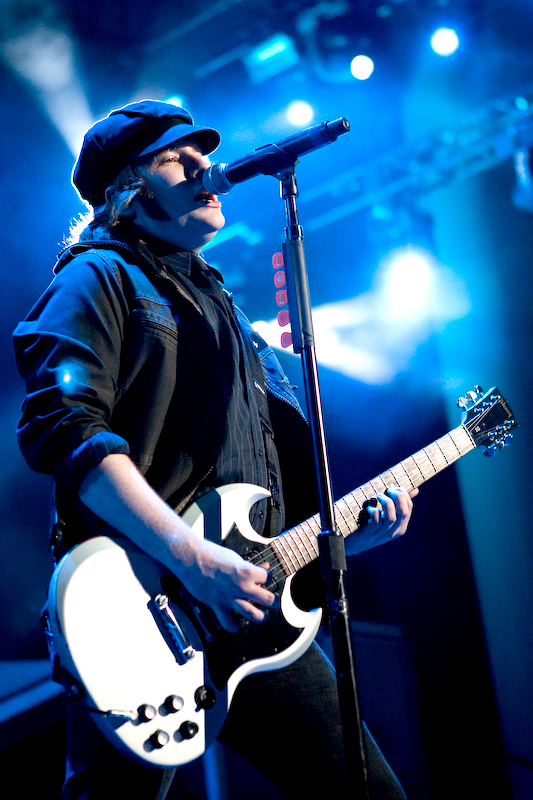
Patrick Stump performed a Navajo version of the end-credits song Beyond the Sea.

In 2016, Disney Character Voices International's senior vice president Rick Dempsey, in collaboration with the Navajo Nation Museum, created a Navajo dubbing of the movie titled Nemo Há'déést'íí which was released in theaters March 18–24 of the same year. The project was thought as a means to preserve Navajo language, teaching the language to kids through a Disney movie. The studio held auditions on the reservation, but finding an age-appropriate native speaker to voice Nemo was hard, Dempsey said, as the majority of native Navajo speakers are over 40 years old. The end credits version of the song "Beyond the Sea", covered in the English version by Robbie Williams, was also adapted into Navajo, with Fall Out Boy's lead singer Patrick Stump performing it. In 2016, Finding Nemo was the second movie to receive a dub in Navajo, after Star Wars.

== Soundtrack ==
Finding Nemo was the first Pixar film not to be scored by Randy Newman. The original soundtrack album was instead scored by Thomas Newman, his cousin, and released on May 20, 2003. The score was nominated for the Academy Award for Original Score, losing to The Lord of the Rings: The Return of the King.

== Release ==
=== Marketing ===
McDonald's restaurants began to sell eight Happy Meal toys based on the film. At the 100th North American International Toy Fair event in New York City, Hasbro unveiled a variety of Finding Nemo toys. A cereal themed to the film was released by Kellogg's, consisting of naturally sweetened oats with fish-shaped marshmallows. Finding Nemo was advertised as promotional partners on other companies, like Frito-Lay, Keebler, Pepsi, Ralphs, Dreyer's, Jel Sert, Airheads, Orville Redenbacher's, and THQ. Before May 26, 2003, stickers on over 50 million bags of potato chips alerted consumers to a sweepstakes dangling a trip for four to Sydney, Australia with a visit to the Great Barrier Reef. On May 17, 2003, Frito-Lay hosted an event at each of the Walmart stores, where kids could use 3D goggles to find hidden images of Nemo. Kellogg's packed eight different water toys depicting film characters inside Frosted Flakes, Rice Krispies, Honey Smacks and Cocoa Rice Krispies cereal boxes. The Honey Smacks, Frosted Flakes, Cinnamon Crunch Crispix and Froot Loops boxes also carried a Nemo memory card game on back panels. Plus, a Nemo-themed Marshmallow Froot Loops cereal featured four of the film's characters. Consumers could mail in two UPCs from the three Kellogg's cereals to receive a large beach towel. Besides this, the company unveiled a new type of Pop-Tarts inspired by Finding Nemo. Known as the Great Berry Reef Pop-Tarts, they had a wild berry filling and fish sprinkles. A pool raft was available with two Pop-Tart UPCs and shipping, handled by Draft Worldwide of Chicago. Eggo waffles would offer holographic swimming goggles with the purchase of two of its products with shipping and handling. For their snacks division, Kellogg's offered consumers who purchased two packages of select products and two gallons of milk with a giant inflatable shark. The company advertised the film on Vanilla Wafers, Chips Deluxe, Mini Fudge Shoppe Fudge Stripes, Soft Batch Chocolate Chip Cookies, Rice Krispies Treats and limited edition Nemo-themed cookies.

On May 20, 2003, Kellogg's recalled Frosted Flakes cereal boxes due to their extremely close resemblance of a Hasbro memory card game. A lawsuit was filed against the company, which included a full-page reproduction of the front of a Frosted Flakes box with the cereal's familiar Tony the Tiger mascot grinning next to Nemo, Dory and Crush from the film. Disney had licensed the characters to use on the game cards. Hasbro had filed the suit to protect its trademark against blatant infringement.

=== Theatrical ===
Finding Nemo was not only the fifth Pixar film, but was also the first one to be released during the domestic summer instead of November, as its four predecessors were. The film premiered in Los Angeles on May 18, 2003, and opened in theaters alongside The Italian Job and Wrong Turn on May 30, 2003.

=== Home media ===
Finding Nemo was released on VHS and DVD on November 4, 2003, both being THX-certified and taken from the digital source. On the 2-disc Collector's Edition DVD release, the first disc features a widescreen version, documentaries, galleries and an audio/visual commentary, and the second disc features a full-frame version, games, sneak peeks of other films (including The Incredibles and Home on the Range), bonus shorts (Knick Knack, which was shown alongside the film in theaters, and Exploring the Reef), and the advertising campaign. Both discs also feature introductions from Stanton and Unkrich and "virtual aquariums" based on the film's various settings.

The film's DVD release sold more than 8 million copies on its first day of release, breaking Spider-Man's record for having the highest single-day DVD sales. It also surpassed Monsters, Inc. for having the highest single-day record for an animated movie. Within two weeks, it went on to become the best-selling DVD of its time, selling over 15 million copies and beating The Lord of the Rings: The Fellowship of the Ring. With over 40 million copies sold, Finding Nemo currently holds the record for the best-selling DVD release of all time. For DVD rentals, the film beat Legally Blonde 2: Red, White & Blonde, Hulk and 28 Days Later to reach the number one spot on the chart in its first week, generating $6.5 million. By December 2003, Finding Nemo had already sold 16.4 million copies and earned $398.3 million in sales revenue, surpassing The Lord of the Rings: The Two Towers to become the highest-selling home video release of 2003. In total, it sold 18.5 million DVD copies and 3.7 million VHS copies, making it the best-selling DVD and VHS titles of that year, overtaking The Two Towers and Harry Potter and the Chamber of Secrets respectively.

The film was then released on both Blu-ray 3D and Blu-ray on December 4, 2012, with both a 3-disc and a 5-disc set. In 2019, Finding Nemo was released on 4K Ultra HD Blu-ray. The film was included on the 100-disc Disney Legacy Animated Film Collection Blu-ray box set, which was released on November 14, 2023.

== Reception ==
=== Box office ===
==== Original theatrical run ====
During its original theatrical run, Finding Nemo grossed $339.7 million in the United States and Canada and $531.3 million in other territories, for a worldwide total of $871.0 million. It was the second-highest-grossing film of 2003, behind The Lord of the Rings: The Return of the King. Finding Nemo also defeated The Matrix Reloaded to become the highest-grossing film of the 2003 summer season. The film sold an estimated 56.4 million tickets in the United States during its initial theatrical run.

On its opening weekend, Finding Nemo earned $70.6 million in the United States and Canada. Upon its debut, it was ranked number one at the box office, dethroning Bruce Almighty and The Italian Job. Additionally, it surpassed its predecessor Monsters, Inc. for having the highest domestic opening weekend for an animated film. It would hold this record until Shrek 2 took it the following year. Finding Nemo achieved the third-highest opening weekend for a 2003 film at the time of its release, behind The Matrix Reloaded and X2. During its second weekend, the film dropped to second place behind 2 Fast 2 Furious. It declined by 34% while making $45.8 million. Nevertheless, the film returned to the number one spot the following week. At that point, it earned $29.2 million, bringing the total domestic gross to $192.3 million. Finding Nemo was the first film to reclaim the number one spot since Die Another Day and Harry Potter and the Chamber of Secrets in 2002. It would also outgross the weaker openings of Rugrats Go Wild, Hollywood Homicide and Dumb and Dumberer: When Harry Met Lloyd. By the film's 20th day of release, Finding Nemo had earned over $200 million. During the film's fourth weekend, it was overtaken by Hulk. Despite this, Finding Nemo continued to draw in large crowds and families throughout the summer season while outgrossing another animated film, Sinbad: Legend of the Seven Seas.

By early July 2003, Finding Nemo had earned $274.9 million, replacing The Matrix Reloaded as the top-grossing movie of the year domestically. The film even surpassed Shrek to become the second highest-grossing animated film. Later that month, the film had earned over $300 million, becoming the highest-grossing animated film in the United States and Canada, surpassing The Lion King. By the end of the summer season, Finding Nemo was one of five films to reach $200 million at the box office in a single summer season, with the others being X2, The Matrix Reloaded, Bruce Almighty and Disney's own Pirates of the Caribbean: The Curse of the Black Pearl. At the end of its theatrical run, Finding Nemo grossed $339.7 million in the United States and Canada and $531.3 million in international territories, totaling $871.0 million worldwide. In all three occasions, it had outgrossed The Lion King to become the highest-grossing animated film. It stayed in the Top 10 until August 14 (11 weeks total). In North America, it was surpassed by both Shrek 2 in 2004 and Toy Story 3 in 2010. Finding Nemo would hold the record for having the highest international gross for an animated film until 2009 when it was taken by Ice Age: Dawn of the Dinosaurs. Outside North America, it stands as the fifth highest-grossing animated film. Worldwide, it currently ranks as the ninth highest-grossing animated film. Moreover, it was the highest-grossing Disney film for three years before Pirates of the Caribbean: Dead Man's Chest surpassed it. Finding Nemo was also the fourth animated film to make $500 million worldwide, joining Monsters, Inc., Aladdin and The Lion King.

The film had impressive box office runs in many international markets. In Japan, its highest-grossing market after North America, it grossed ¥11.2 billion ($102.4 million), becoming the highest-grossing foreign animated film in local currency (yen). It has only been surpassed by Frozen (¥25.5 billion). Plus, Finding Nemo was the second film by Buena Vista Pictures to reach $100 million in the country, just after Armageddon in 1999. For its Japanese opening weekend, the film earned $10 million, reaching the number one spot ahead of The Last Samurai. In Mexico, it earned $4.7 million, making it the country's second-highest opening weekend, behind Spider-Man. Finding Nemo generated $12.9 million in Germany, surpassing Ice Age to have the country's highest opening weekend for an animated film, as well as securing the third-highest overall, after Harry Potter and the Chamber of Secrets and its predecessor Harry Potter and the Sorcerer's Stone. The film also grossed £37.2 million ($67.1 million) in the U.K., Ireland, and Malta. It first generated a total opening weekend gross of £7.4 million ($12.3 million), making it the second-highest of the year, after The Matrix Reloaded. At the Manchester UCI Cinemas, it made a total three-day opening gross of £17,150 ($28,583), becoming the theater's highest-grossing digital film at the time, surpassing Star Wars: Episode II – Attack of the Clones and numerous other releases. Making £28.7 million ($35.7 million), Finding Nemo was the highest-grossing film released in October 2003 in the region, beating Bad Boys II. Following in biggest grosses are France and the Maghreb region ($64.8 million), Germany ($53.9 million), and Spain ($29.5 million).

==== 3D re-release ====
After the success of the 3D re-release of The Lion King, Disney re-released Finding Nemo in 3D on September 14, 2012, with a conversion cost estimated to be below $5 million. For the opening weekend of its 3D re-release in North America, Finding Nemo grossed $16.7 million, debuting at the No. 2 spot behind Resident Evil: Retribution. The film earned $41.1 million in North America and $28.2 million internationally, for a combined total of $69.3 million, and a cumulative worldwide total of $940.3 million.

=== Critical response ===
On the review aggregator website Rotten Tomatoes, 99% of 266 critics' reviews are positive, with an average rating of 8.7/10. The website's consensus reads, "Breathtakingly lovely and grounded by the stellar efforts of a well-chosen cast, Finding Nemo adds another beautifully crafted gem to Pixar's crown." Metacritic (which uses a weighted average) assigned the film a score of 90 out of 100 based on 38 reviews, indicating "universal acclaim". Audiences polled by CinemaScore gave the film a rare "A+" grade on an A+ to F scale. Finding Nemo was the third Pixar film to achieve this score, following Toy Story 2 in 1999 and Monsters, Inc. in 2001.

Perfect scores, most commonly four-out-of-four-star reviews were given by Roger Ebert, among others. Critics claimed Finding Nemo to be the best big-budget release of 2003, the best animated film with an underwater setting since The Little Mermaid (1989). While the Houston Chronicle suggested Finding Nemo lived up to Pixar's high standards, critics such as Stephen Holden considered its overall quality slightly under that of the Toy Story and Monsters, Inc. In an A-graded review for Entertainment Weekly, Lisa Schwarzbaum called Finding Nemo as "marvelously soulful and innately, fluidly American as jazz."

Several critics were wowed by the film's visuals, especially with the ocean and underwater settings. Ebert called it "one of those rare movies where I wanted to sit in the front row and let the images wash out to the edges of my field of vision". Some, like Sandra Hall, called the environment an undersea Fantasia. Ed Park of The Village Voice called it "an ocean of eye candy that tastes fresh even in this ADD-addled era of SpongeBob SquarePants", and The New Yorker suggested Pixar continued to "lent an indispensable vigor and wit to the sagging art of mainstream animation".

The characters were praised as relatable and more developed than human characters in other films like those in the Mission: Impossible series. As Kenneth Turan described them, "Nemo erupts with sea creatures that showcase Stanton and company's gift for character and peerless eye for skewering contemporary culture." Brooks' performance was the "showstopper" for David Edelstein, who described it as "tender, cranky, hysterical, yet somehow lucid". The humor was another source of praise. Associated Press opined it was "laced with smart humor and clever gags, and buoyed by another cheery story of mismatched buddies." The Detroit News labeled the film, "a simple test of humanity: If you don't laugh aloud while watching it, you've got a battery not a heart."

The 3D re-release prompted a retrospective on the film nine years after its initial release. Stephen Whitty of The Star-Ledger described it as "a genuinely funny and touching film that, in less than a decade, has established itself as a timeless classic." On the 3D re-release, Lisa Schwarzbaum of Entertainment Weekly wrote that its emotional power was deepened by "the dimensionality of the oceanic deep" where "the spatial mysteries of watery currents and floating worlds are exactly where 3D explorers were born to boldly go". Pete Vonder Haar of Houston Press also gave the film a scoring of four out of five on the 3-D release, stating that "Gill is Platoon's Sgt. Elias if he'd survived Sgt. Barnes' treachery and returned to civilian life weary and hard-bitten from his experiences. And also a fish."

Finding Nemo was included on a number of best-of lists. The film appeared on professional rankings from BBC and The Independent based on retrospective appraisal, as one of the greatest films of the twenty-first century. Several publications have listed it as one of the best animated films, including: IGN (2010), Insider, USA Today, Elle (all 2018), Parade, Complex, and Time Out New York (all 2021). In December 2021, the film's screenplay was listed number 60 on the Writers Guild of America's "101 Greatest Screenplays of the 21st Century (So Far)". In June 2025, actress Rachel Zegler and filmmaker Rob Marshall cited the film as among their favorites of the 21st century. In July 2025, it was one of the films voted for the "Readers' Choice" edition of The New York Times' list of "The 100 Best Movies of the 21st Century", finishing at number 152.

=== Accolades ===
At the 76th Academy Awards, Finding Nemo became the first Pixar film to win the Best Animated Feature category, defeating Brother Bear and The Triplets of Belleville. The film received three more Academy Award nominations for Best Original Screenplay, Best Original Score and Best Sound Editing. It also won the award for Best Animated Film at the Kansas City Film Critics Circle Awards, the Saturn Awards the Las Vegas Film Critics Society Awards, the National Board of Review Awards, the Online Film Critics Society Awards, and the Toronto Film Critics Association Awards. The film received many other awards, including: Kids Choice Awards for Favorite Movie and Favorite Voice from an Animated Movie (Ellen DeGeneres), and the Saturn Award for Best Supporting Actress (Ellen DeGeneres).

The film was also nominated for two Chicago Film Critics Association Awards, for Best Picture and Best Supporting Actress (Ellen DeGeneres), a Golden Globe Award for Best Motion Picture – Musical or Comedy, and two MTV Movie Awards, for Best Movie and Best Comedic Performance (Ellen DeGeneres).

In June 2008, the American Film Institute revealed its "Ten Top Ten", the best 10 films in 10 "classic" American film genres, after polling over 1,500 people from the creative community. Finding Nemo was acknowledged as the 10th best film in the animation genre. It was the most recently released film among all 10 lists, and one of only three movies made after the year 2000 (the others being The Lord of the Rings: The Fellowship of the Ring and Shrek).

American Film Institute recognition:

- AFI's 100 Years…100 Movies – Nominated
- AFI's 10 Top 10 – No. 10 Animated film

=== Environmental concerns and consequences ===
The film's use of clownfish prompted concerns of mass purchases of the fish breed as pets in the United States – later dubbed the "Nemo effect" –, even though the story portrayed the use of fish as pets negatively and suggested that saltwater aquariums are notably tricky and expensive to maintain. The demand for clownfish was supplied by large-scale harvesting of tropical fish in regions like Vanuatu.

Demand for tropical fish skyrocketed after the film's release, causing reef species decimation in Vanuatu and several other reef areas. After seeing the film, some aquarium owners released their pet fish into the ocean, but failed to release them into the correct oceanic habitat, which introduced species that are harmful to the indigenous environment, a practice that is harming reefs worldwide.

A 2017 study by researchers from James Cook University in Australia found little evidence for a so-called fan-based "Nemo effect" purchases of wild-caught fish immediately (within 1.5 years of release) following the film. A followup study in 2019 by zoologists at the University of Oxford studied sales after the release of Finding Dory and found no increase in sales of the fish and instead found "information seeking behaviour."

=== Film related tourism ===
The Australian Tourism Commission (ATC) launched several marketing campaigns in China and the United States to improve tourism in Australia, many of them utilizing Finding Nemo clips. Queensland used Finding Nemo to draw tourists to promote itself to vacationers.

== Legacy ==
=== Sequel ===
A spin-off sequel (Note: Though some sources called Finding Dory a spin-off, others referred to as a sequel.) to this film was released in June 2016, titled Finding Dory. It focuses on Dory having a journey to reunite with her parents (Diane Keaton and Eugene Levy).

=== Short films ===
Two short films, an educational documentary, Exploring the Reef with Jean-Michel Cousteau (2003) and Marine Life Interviews (2016), were released as part of the home releases for Finding Nemo and Finding Dory, respectively. In April 2026, Pixar announced that a new short film set in the world of Finding Nemo is in development, with DeGeneres returning to reprise her role.

=== Video games ===
A video game based on the film was released in 2003, for Microsoft Windows, Xbox, PlayStation 2, GameCube, and Game Boy Advance. The goal of the game is to complete different levels under the roles of Nemo, Marlin or Dory. It includes cut scenes from the movie, and each clip is based on a level. It was also the last Pixar game developed by Traveller's Tales. Upon release, the game received mixed reviews. A Game Boy Advance sequel, titled Finding Nemo: The Continuing Adventures, was released in 2004.

=== Theme park attractions ===
Finding Nemo has inspired numerous attractions and properties at Disney Parks around the world, including: Turtle Talk with Crush, which opened in 2004 at Epcot, 2005 in Disney California Adventure Park, 2008 in Hong Kong Disneyland, and 2009 in Tokyo DisneySea; Finding Nemo Submarine Voyage, which opened in 2007 in Disneyland Park; The Seas with Nemo & Friends, which opened in 2007 at Epcot; Finding Nemo – The Musical, which opened in 2007 in Disney's Animal Kingdom; and Crush's Coaster, which opened in 2007 at Walt Disney Studios Park.
