= Henrike Naumann =

German contemporary installation artist (1984–2026)

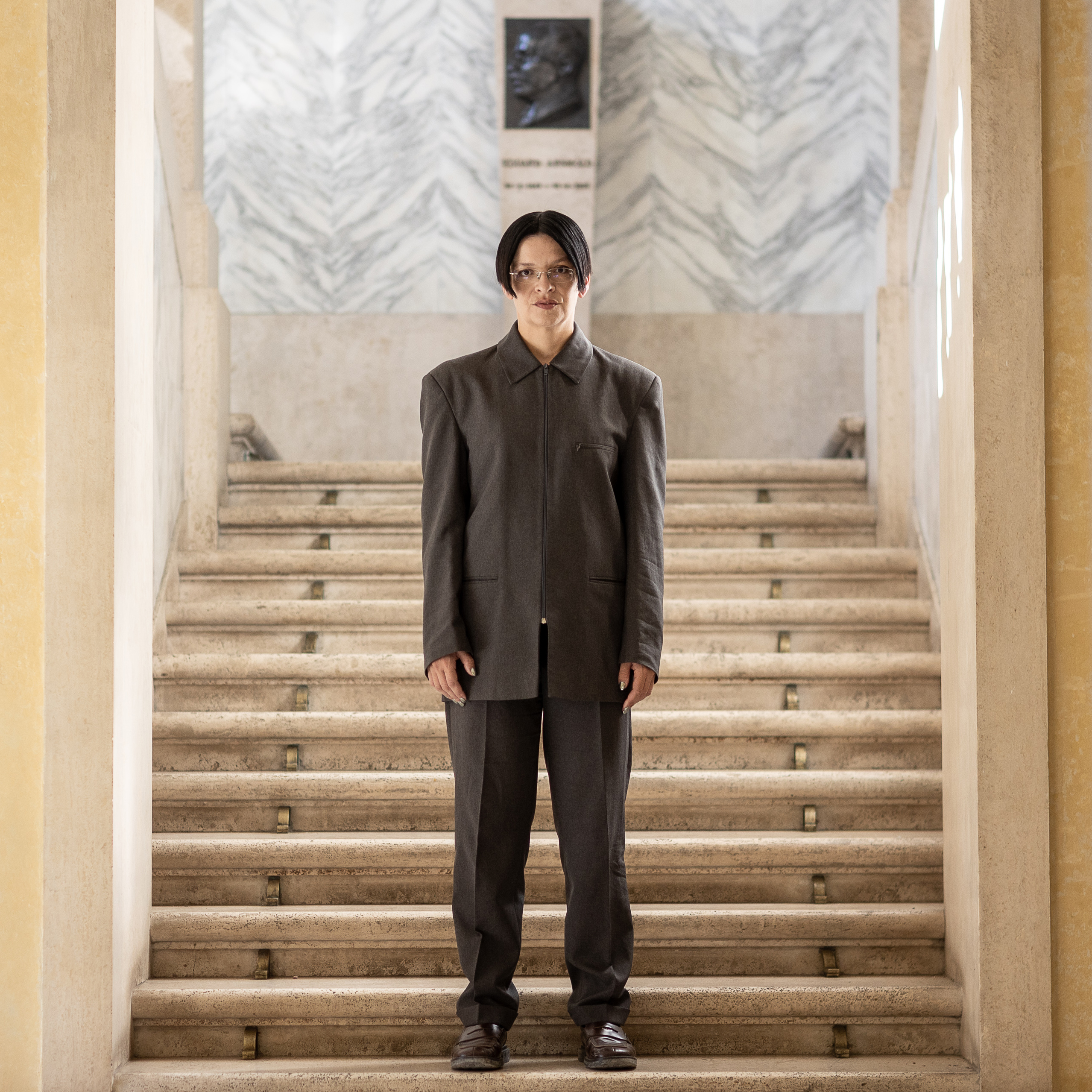
- Naumann in 2025
- Born: 1984; Zwickau, East Germany
- Died: 14 February 2026 (aged 41); Berlin, Germany
- Education: Dresden Academy of Fine Arts; Konrad Wolf Film University of Babelsberg
- Occupation: Artist
- Known for: Installation art
- Website: henrikenaumann.com

Henrike Naumann (1984 – 14 February 2026) was a German installation artist. She became known for her furniture installations, often made from wall units from the 1990s. In her work, she explored the relationship between furniture and interior design with political and social issues. Her unconventional approach to complex political issues has garnered broad media attention. Naumann received numerous awards, including the Karl-Schmidt-Rottluff Fellowship, the Max Pechstein Prize from the city of Zwickau, and the Villa Aurora Scholarship from the Thomas Mann House, Los Angeles. Major exhibitions of her work have taken place at the SculptureCenter in New York, the Haus der Kunst in Munich, Documenta in Kassel and the Kyiv Biennal in Ukraine. At the 61st Venice Biennale in summer 2026, Naumann was set to design the German pavilion together with Sung Tieu.

== Life and career ==
Naumann was the granddaughter of artist Karl Heinz Jakob, who was also awarded the Max Pechstein Prize. She studied stage and costume design at the Dresden Academy of Fine Arts and scenography at the Konrad Wolf Film University of Babelsberg.

She described the arson committed by and subsequent arrest of Beate Zschäpe on 4 November 2011 – during the exposure of far-right terrorist group National Socialist Underground – as having been a key moment in her artistic development. At the time, Naumann was only a few hundred meters away, visiting her grandmother in the Weißenborn district. Deeply affected by these events, she addressed the origins of the National Socialist Underground in post-reunification East Germany in her thesis project Triangular Stories.

Naumann's first international exhibition took place at the 2015 Ghetto Biennale in Port-au-Prince, Haiti. The Museum of Trance, created in collaboration with Bastian Hagedorn, marked a shift from earlier works integrating video and sound, towards objects that speak for themselves.

In her 2017 work Das Reich, Naumann recreated Stonehenge made of wall units at the Kronprinzenpalais in Berlin to address the Reichsbürger movement at the historic site where the Unification Treaty was signed. Her 2019 exhibition Ostalgie reflected on the legacy of the GDR during the 1990s. It demonstrated Naumann's radical approach to architecture by covering gallery's concrete walls with carpet and using them as flooring for her furniture, tilted at 90 degrees.

In 2021, several of Naumann's works were exhibited simultaneously in Ukraine and Russia, including at the PinchukArtCentre in Kyiv and the Tretyakov Gallery in Moscow. Following Russia's invasion of Ukraine in 2022, the exhibitions were closed. One of her works was evacuated from Kyiv through the war zone. That same year, Naumann held her first solo exhibition Re-Education in the United States at the SculptureCenter in New York, where she used her experience with German history to examine U.S. politics. Her installation Rustic Traditions (2022) explores the role of furniture in the 2021 storming of the United States capitol.

Naumann combined her artistic work with lecturing and teaching. In her lecture What Comes After Postmodernism (2023) at the Bundeskunsthalle in Bonn, she reflected on her work at the 2023 Kyiv Biennal and the topic of art and war. Starting in the winter semester of 2026, she was to take up a professorship in sculpture at the University of Fine Arts Hamburg. She lived in Berlin.

Naumann died from cancer in Berlin, on 14 February 2026, at the age of 41.

== Projects ==
=== Selected works ===
- 2023 Breathe dealt with mobilization and Decommunization in Ukraine in form of a performance in the Drama Theater Ivano-Frankivsk.
- 2022 Rustic Traditions focuses on the January 6 United States Capitol attack and the role played by Federal Style furniture.
- 2020 Die Monotonie des Yeah Yeah Yeah deals with the history of Ostalgie raves based on Walter Ulbricht's quote about “Yeah”. In the video work of the same name, the Town Musicians of Bremen unite with dinosaurs to bring down the Berlin Wall.
- 2019 Ruinenwert is an exploration of the ideology and history of National Socialism and its aesthetics based on the work of Hitler's interior designer Gerdy Troost. In 2021, Naumann adapted the work for her solo exhibition Einstürzende Reichsbauten at Kunsthaus Dahlem, the former studio of Nazi sculptor Arno Breker.
- 2019 Ostalgie deals with the politics of memory of the GDR through a comparison with The Flintstones and the “primal society” according to Friedrich Engels. Today, the work is in the collection of the Busch-Reisinger Museum at Harvard.
- 2019 Tag X is based on the Hannibal network of prepper groups and stages a memorial in which home accessories and design classics interpreted as weapons are exhibited, such as the Wassily Chair by Marcel Breuer and the lemon squeezer by Philippe Starck for Alessi. The work was exhibited at Berlin's Alexanderplatz as part of the 30th anniversary of the Peaceful Revolution of 1989.
- 2018 2000 relates the Expo 2000 to German reunification. The work was exhibited at the Busan Biennale in 2018 and discussed in the context of the division of Korea. During the Russian invasion of Ukraine in 2022, the installation was exhibited at the PinchukArtCentre Kyiv and was evacuated to the Martin-Gropius-Bau in Berlin.
- 2018 DDR Noir exhibits works of Naumann's own grandfather, the GDR graphical artist Karl Heinz Jakob amidst furniture of the period after reunification The work was conceived for the municipal gallery Galerie im Turm at Frankfurter Tor, which was the exhibition space of the Association of Visual Artists of the GDR.
- 2018 Eurotique, created as part of the first Riga International Biennial of Contemporary Art, deals with the phenomenon of “eiroremonts” (Latvian for “euro repair”). Today the work is in the collection of the Museum of Modern Art Warsaw.
- 2018 14 Words refers to the racist formula of Fourteen Words and depicts a former East German retail store with reference to the National Socialist Underground and its victims, most of whom were self-employed and shot in their own businesses.
- 2018 Anschluss ‘90 explores the idea that Austria would have “rejoined” the German Reich in 1990, the year of German reunification. As part of steirischer herbst, Naumann opened a furniture store in Graz where people could set themselves up for the “reunification”.
- 2017 Das Reich displays far-right ideology and the Reichsbürger movement symbolized in a spatial installation in the form of a Stonehenge made of wall units.
- 2016 Aufbau Ost considers the transformation of the GDR and the integration of East and West Germany using the aesthetics of everyday items.
- 2015 The Museum of Trance is a fictional ethnological museum about German trance music, which Henrike Naumann opened in 2015 with the musician Bastian Hagedorn as part of the Ghetto Biennale in a Vodou temple in Port-au-Prince, Haiti (reflections on spirituality, rave culture, exoticism, etc.). This was followed in 2021 by a multimedia installation filmed in the former Tresor with Mark Reeder as a trance archaeologist, and in 2022 by an adaptation of the work in the form of a trance organ in the church of St. Kunigundis in Kassel as part of the documenta at the invitation of Ghetto Biennale and Atis Rezistans. The exhibition was named the best exhibition of 2022 by the German section of the AICA (Association des Critiques d'Art).
- 2012 Triangular Stories contrasts hedonistic and neo-Nazi youth culture in the 1990s in the form of a fictitious youth room of Beate Zschäpe, in which staged home movies shot on VHS from the youth of the National Socialist Underground are integrated.

=== Selected solo exhibitions ===
- 2024 Innere Sicherheit, Wall Memorial of the Bundestag
- 2023 Westalgie , IKOB International Art Centre, Eupen, Belgium
- 2022 Re-Education, SculptureCenter, New York
- 2022 2000 – Back Home, Gropius Bau, Berlin
- 2022 Westalgie, CAC – la synagogue de Delme, France
- 2021 Einstürzende Reichsbauten, Kunsthaus Dahlem, Berlin
- 2019 2000, LVZ-Kunstpreis, Museum der bildenden Künste, Leipzig
- 2019 2000 – Mensch. Natur. Twipsy., Kunstverein Hannover
- 2019 Das Reich, Belvedere 21, Vienna
- 2019 Ostalgie, KOW Berlin
- 2018 DDR Noir, Galerie im Turm, Berlin
- 2018 2000, Abteiberg Museum, Mönchengladbach
- 2016 Intercouture, Musée d'Art Contemporain et Multimédia Echangeur de Limete, Kinshasa, Democratic Republic of the Congo
- 2016 Aufbau Ost, Galerie Wedding, Berlin
- 2013 Generation Loss, Freunde Aktueller Kunst, Zwickau

=== Selected works in public collections ===
- Harvard Art Museums, US
- Bundeskunstsammlung
- MMK Museum für Moderne Kunst Frankfurt
- Belvedere 21 Vienna, AT
- Lentos Linz, AT
- Mudam Luxemburg, LU
- IKOB Eupen, BE
- Kunstsammlung Nordrhein-Westfalen
- Kunstsammlungen Chemnitz
- Staatliche Kunstsammlungen Dresden
- Kunstpalast Düsseldorf
- Städtische Kunstsammlungen Zwickau
- Museum Abteiberg Mönchengladbach

=== Lecture series ===
- What comes after Postmodernism?, Bundeskunsthalle, Bonn 2023
- Foreign Agent, Tbilisi Photography & Multimedia Museum, Tbilisi 2024
- Breathe, Screening und Gespräch mit Vasyl Cherepanyn, Kyiv Biennale, Berlin 2024
- Ossification, Harvard Art Museums, Boston 2024
- Orcs from the East, HFG Offenbach 2025

=== Publications ===
- Henrike Naumann – Concepts, Bierke Books, Berlin 2024, ISBN 978-3-948546-18-2
- Henrike Naumann, Angela Schönberger, Andreas Brandolini (authors), Matthias Kliefoth (publisher): Einstürzende Reichsbauten, DISTANZ Verlag, Berlin 2021, ISBN 978-3-95476-358-0.
- Henrike Naumann – 2000, Spector Books, Leipzig 2019, ISBN 978-3959053570
- Henrike Naumann - The Effects Can Last Forever, Goldrausch, Berlin 2014
- Henrike Naumann – Triangular Stories, Diplomarbeit an der Hochschule für Film und Fernsehen “Konrad Wolf”, Potsdam-Babelsberg 2012

=== Selected prizes, grants and residencies ===
- 2024/2025 Berliner Programm Künstlerische Forschung
- 2024 Villa Aurora / Thomas Mann House
- 2019 Max-Pechstein-Prize
- 2019 Arts̶ prize of the Leipziger Volkszeitung
- 2018 Karl-Schmidt-Rottluff-Stipendium
- 2017 Global cultural exchange grant of the Senate of Berlin
- 2016 Residency of the Goethe-Institut Kinshasa
- 2015 Maroc Artist Meeting, Marrakesh, Marokko
- 2015 German Embassy, Port-au-Prince, Haiti
- 2014 Goldrausch Künstlerinnenprojekt
- 2013 Expanded Media Award, Filmwinter Stuttgart

=== Selected group exhibitions ===
- 2025 The Impermanent – Four Takes on the Collection, Museum of Modern Art Warsaw, Poland
- 2024 Made in Germany? Art and Identity in a Global Nation, Busch-Reisinger Museum, Harvard Art Museums, Cambridge, Massachusetts, USA
- 2024 Die Reise der Bilder , Lentos Linz, Austria
- 2023 On the Periphery of War, Kyiv Biennial, Iwano-Frankiwsk, Ukraine
- 2023 Channeling, Museum für Moderne Kunst, Frankfurt/Main
- 2023 Illiberal Lives in Ludwig Forum Aachen, with Pauline Curnier Jardin, Johanna Hedva, Ho Rui An, Blaise Kirschner, Jota Mombaça, Henrike Naumann, Melika Ngombe Kolongo, Bassem Saad, Mikołaj Sobczak and Jordan Strafer, with five installations by Henrike Naumann
- 2022 A War in the Distance, stierischer herbst, Graz, Austria
- 2022 Atis Rezistans / Ghetto Biennale, documenta fifteen, Kirche St. Kunigundis, Kassel
- 2021 Future Generation Art Prize, PinchukArtCentre, Kyiv, Ukraine
- 2021 Illiberal Arts, Haus der Kulturen der Welt, Berlin
- 2019 Innenleben, Haus der Kunst, Munich
- 2019 Point of No Return, Museum der Bildenden Künste Leipzig
- 2018 Because I Live Here, Museum für Moderne Kunst, Frankfurt/Main
- 2018 Volksfronten, stierischer herbst, Graz, Austria
- 2018 Divided We Stand, Busan Biennale, South Korea
- 2017 5th Ghetto Biennale, Port-au-Prince, Haiti
- 2017 3. Berliner Herbstsalon, Kronprinzenpalais, Berlin
