= Entertainment center =

Furniture to house electronic appliances

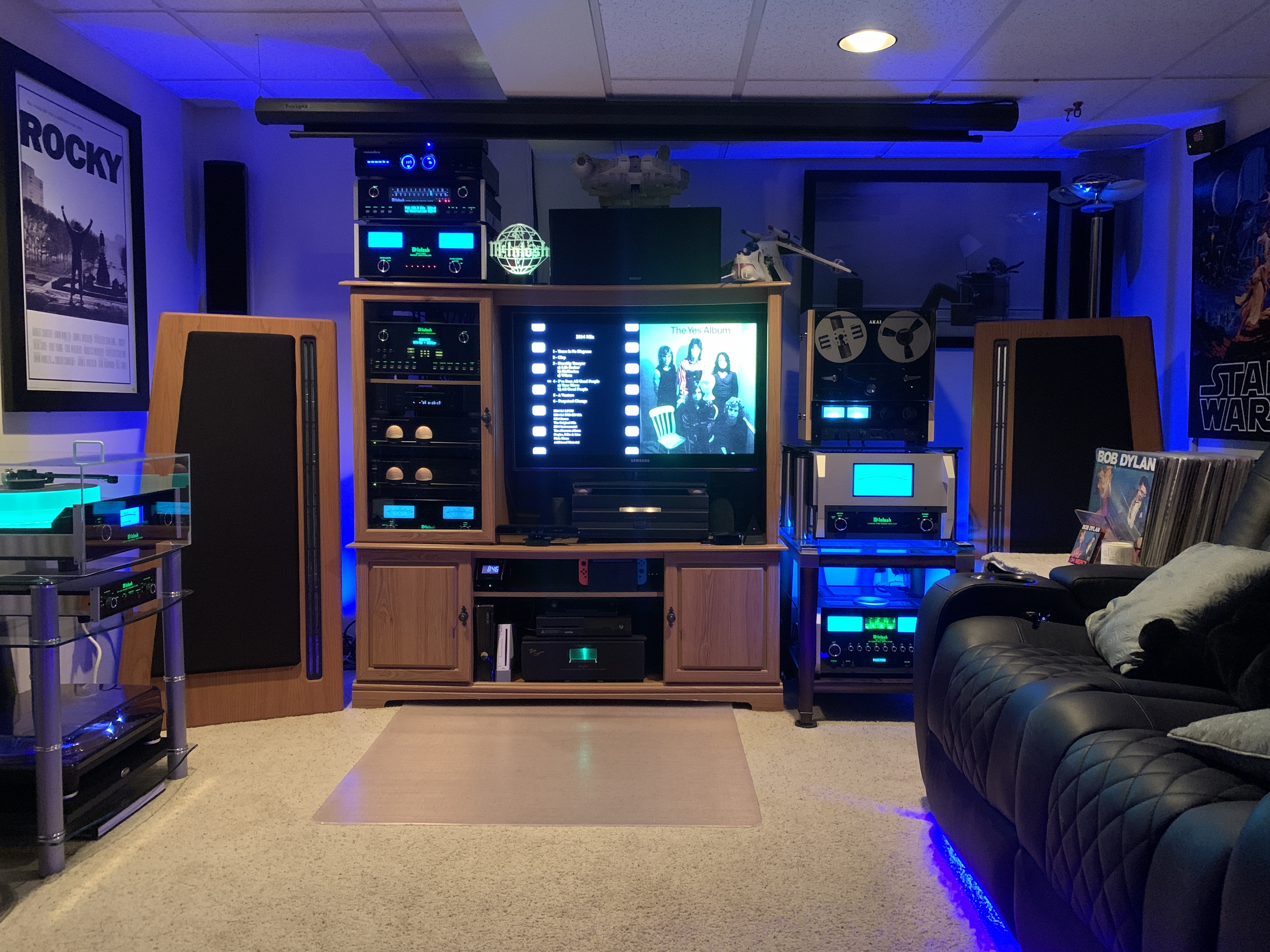
Home entertainment center.

An entertainment center (or centre), also known as an entertainment complex or a home entertainment center, is a piece of furniture designed to house consumer electronic appliances and components. It is sometimes a large cabinet with an exterior styled to appear like upscale furniture and an interior dedicated to electronic gear, such as home audio, television sets and video game equipment.

Antique or modern reproduction armoires or standing cabinets are used for entertainment centers, as are shelves and shelving systems. Part of the purpose of an entertainment center is to neatly house the many wires and cables that are associated with audio and video components, and they often contain dedicated areas (either drawers or other spaces) for storage of records, videotapes, CDs and/or DVDs.

Contemporary TV stand.

A TV stand is usually a smaller item of furniture, large enough to support an average television of the 1970s or 1980s (with a boxy footprint), often with some additional media components in a cabinet below, such as a stereo amplifier or a DVD player. These were often made of wood and equipped with casters. Wheels allowed access to the cabling from behind, access for cleaning behind and beneath, and permitted temporary relocation of the television for specific viewing scenarios. As televisions became larger, they became unwieldy to move, and less in need of being moved due to better viewing at a distance. Also becoming at the same time much thinner, and more suited to permanent fixture. During this transition, TV stands gave way to entertainment centers in many homes.

In many homes, an entertainment center is often placed in the living room, family room, recreation room, or bedroom. Audioholics reviewer James Larson criticized entertainment centers for causing bad performance in speaker systems, poor ventilation of electronics, poor access to cables and connections, and restrictions on television sizes. According to Larson, a better choice is "a low-profile, minimalist TV stand".

== See also ==
- Home cinema
- Wall unit
- Radiogram
