= Black Clouds =

Black Clouds may refer to:

== Music ==
=== Albums ===
- Black Clouds, an album by Outrage (1988)
- Black Clouds, an album by Grant Nicholas (2015)

=== Songs ===
- "Black Clouds", a song by D-Black (2013)
- "Black Clouds", a song by NCT 127 from 2 Baddies (2022)
- "Black Clouds", a song by Nesey Gallons from Two Bicycles (2009)
- "Black Clouds", a song by The String Cheese Incident from Born on the Wrong Planet (1997)
- "Black Clouds", a song by Wiz Kilo (2014)

== See also ==
- Black Clouds & Silver Linings, an album by Dream Theater
- Black Cloud (disambiguation)
- Dark Cloud (disambiguation)
