= Dark Cloud (disambiguation) =

Dark Cloud is the first in a series of console role-playing games. Its spiritual sequel is Dark Cloud 2 or Dark Chronicle.

Dark cloud or dark clouds may also refer to:

- Dark nebula or dark cloud, a type of interstellar cloud
- Dark Cloud (actor), a Native Canadian silent film actor
- Dark Cloud (activist), an Indigenous rights activist
- "Dark Cloud", a 2020 song by Younha from Unstable Mindset
- "Dark Clouds" (Rod Wave song), a song by Rod Wave
- "Dark Clouds" (Space song), a song by Space
- "Dark Clouds", a song by Rudimental from the album Toast to Our Differences
- "Dark Cloud", 212th episode of Adventure Time
- Dark Cloud, a fictional character in the 2000 film Crouching Tiger, Hidden Dragon

== See also ==
- Black Cloud (disambiguation)
- Black Clouds (disambiguation)
- Dark Nebula (disambiguation)
- Kali Ghata (disambiguation) (lit. 'Dark Clouds'), Indian films
- List of cloud types
