= Ginesi =

Ginesi is an Italian surname. Notable people with the surname include:

- Edna Ginesi (1902–2000), British artist
- Veriano Ginesi (1907–1989), Italian actor

== See also ==
- Gini (disambiguation)
