= Dark Nebula =

A dark nebula is a type of interstellar cloud.

Dark Nebula may also refer to:

- Dark Nebula (video game), an action video game by Swedish studio 1337 Game Design
- Dark Nebula (board game), a 1980 board wargame by Game Designers' Workshop
- Dark Nebula (Kirby), a character in the Kirby video game series

== See also ==
- Dark Cloud (disambiguation)
