= Chachos =

Tortilla chip snack produced by Keebler

Chachos were tortilla chip snacks produced by Keebler in the late 1980s/early 1990s. They were flour-based, as opposed to most common tortilla chips, which are corn-based (notably Tostitos). Chachos were available in three varieties: Cheesy Quesadilla, cinnamon Crispana, a particularly beloved flavor by chip enthusiasts, and Restaurant Style Original.

As of 2006, Chachos were no longer produced or available in stores. Similar to Chachos, Keebler produced a savory potato chip known as O'Boisies. These were no longer on the market until 2010, when they were brought back due to popular demand. Now, O'Boises are only sold in select stores.

Chachos is a registered trademark in Malaysia and Singapore for a food product made from "masa corn flour imported from USA". The product line was launched in 1997. The product line includes three flavors: Cheesy Cheese, BBQ Bonanza, and Spicy Curry.
