= Somewhere We Both Walk =

Studio album by Nesey Gallons
- Released: April 15, 2009; March 13, 2015 (2015 Reissue)
- Length: 28:06
- Labels: Hurrah for Karamazov; Carousel Breakfast (2015 Reissue)
- Producer: Nesey Gallons

Nesey Gallons chronology
Two Bicycles (2009)	Somewhere We Both Walk (2009)	Eyes & Eyes & Eyes Ago (2009)

Somewhere We Both Walk is a second self-released work from Maine's Nesey Gallons. It was put together in a limited edition, CD-R format of Eyes & Eyes & Eyes Ago with homemade packaging along with Two Bicycles and includes a booklet of something written by Gallons herself. It is "a cdr of a phase piece i recorded in brooklyn with a little booklet of a "love story" written at the same time. im the only one who plays on it (bowed things out of phase) but it was recorded in the apartment where julian and i lived when a lot of fine work was done on clouds and tornadoes. its meant to be played impossibly loud through speakers while reading the "story". i hope this clarifies things a bit."

On March 13, 2015, the book and CD-R were reissued by the Michigan label Carousel Breakfast.

== Track listing ==
1. "Somewhere We Both Walk" – 28:06
