= Gini =

Gini may refer to:

- Gini coefficient (also the Gini index) in economics, an indicator of income inequality
- G.I.N.I., a predecessor organization to Post-Polio Health International
- Gini (soft drink), a French brand of soft drink
- A jinni, or djinni or genie, a member of the jinn supernatural beings

== People ==
=== Given name ===
- Gini Koch, American fantasy/SF writer
- Gini Reticker, American film director
- Gini Cruz Santos (born 1966), Filipina animator at Pixar
- Gini Graham Scott (born 1942), American non-fiction author in various fields

=== Surname ===
- Corrado Gini (1884–1965), Italian statistician, demographer, sociologist and developer of the Gini coefficient
- Luis Gini (born 1935), Paraguayan footballer
- Mahabub Ara Begum Gini (born 1961), Bangladeshi politician
- Marc Gini (born 1984), Swiss alpine skier
- Maria L. Gini, Italian-American scientist in AI/robotics
- Gjini family, prominent Albanian family of the 16th-17th centuries
