= Kali Ghata =

Kali Ghata (lit. 'Dark Clouds') may refer to these Indian films:

- Kali Ghata (1951 film), a 1951 Hindi film directed by Kishore Sahu and starring Kishore Sahu, Bina Rai, and Asha Mathur
- Kali Ghata (1980 film), a 1980 Hindi film directed by Ved Rahi and starring Shashi Kapoor and Rekha

== See also ==
- Dark Cloud (disambiguation)
