= Pizzarias =

American snack chips made from pizza dough

Pizzarias Pizza Chips were a line of snack chips made by the Keebler Company and were developed by Adam Burck, Keebler's New Product Development Manager at the time.

== History ==
Pizzarias were made in a novel process from fresh pizza dough and were available in three flavors: Cheese Pizza, Pizza Supreme, and Zesty Pepperoni. Launched in 1991, Pizzarias were reported to be the most successful snack food launch in Keebler's history, earning wholesale revenue of $75 million in their first year. Due to the success of the Pizzarias launch, Keebler was named "New Product Marketer of the Year" in 1992 by the American Marketing Association. Pizzarias also earned a Gold Edison award from the AMA for marketing excellence.

Pizzarias was supported by an extensive marketing campaign, including a series of three television commercials introducing the first teenage Keebler Elves, JJ and Zoot, with slang catchphrases such as "Radical grub!" and the tagline: "Tastes like real pizza, only louder."

Although the brand was ultimately discontinued after the sale and breakup of Keebler in the late 1990s, Pizzarias developed a cult following. At least two Pizzarias fan groups on Facebook, such as "Bring back Pizzaria Chips made by Keebler" and "Bring Keebler Pizzaria's Back" are lobbying Utz Quality Foods, the current owner of the trademark, to relaunch the brand; as of October 2023, the groups had over 10,000 Followers. Retrobrands America LLC has a pending application for the Pizzarias Trademark as of August, 2026.

=== Pizzarias in Popular Culture ===
Pizzarias were mentioned in the Netflix original series, Everything Sucks! and "rank high on the list of snack foods that still haunt ’90s kids as adults."

In 2017, The Daily Meal included Pizzarias in its list of the most popular snack foods in the last ten decades.
