= Gini Cruz Santos =

Filipina animator (born 1966)

Gini Santos
- Born: 1966 (age 59–60) Pasay, Rizal, Philippines
- Notable works: Dory on Finding Nemo
- Awards: Annie nomination (2003); VES nomination (2004)

Gini Cruz Santos (born 1966) is a Filipina animator at Pixar based in the San Francisco Bay Area. She worked on numerous Pixar animated films including Toy Story 2, Monsters, Inc., Finding Nemo, A Bug's Life, The Incredibles, Ratatouille, Toy Story 3, Up, Lifted, and Brave. She was nominated in 2004 for an Annie award for her detailed lifelike animation on Finding Nemo, and was nominated by the Visual Effects Society for an award for this project as well.

== Early life and education ==
Santos was born in Pasay in the Philippines. She moved to Guam after age three but returned to study in the Philippines. She studied Fine Arts at the University of Santo Tomas with a major in advertising. She earned a Master of Fine Arts degree in Computer Arts from the School of Visual Arts in New York City.

== Career ==
Santos worked as an art director at an advertising agency. In 1996, she was hired by Pixar after submitting her short feature reel entitled The Eclipse without submitting her resume; her reel focused on human relationships. Her animation of Dory, voiced by Ellen DeGeneres, on the film Finding Nemo was praised for integrating "fish movement, human movement, and facial expressions to make them look and feel like real characters". She was the supervising animator on the Pixar short film entitled Lifted. She was lauded for her work in Brave. She is sometimes described as a Pixnoy: a Filipino-American or Fil-am artist working at Pixar.

== Filmography ==
- A Bug's Life (1998): additional animator
- Toy Story 2 (1999): animator
- Monsters, Inc. (2001): character developer, animator, additional layout artist
- Finding Nemo (2003): animator
- The Incredibles (2004): animator
- Cars (2006): additional animator
- Lifted (2006): supervising animator
- Ratatouille (2007): animator
- Your Friend the Rat (2007): 3D animator
- Presto (2008): animator
- WALL-E (2008): additional animator
- Up (2009): animator
- Toy Story 3 (2010): animator
- Cars 2 (2011): animator
- Toy Story Toons (2011):
  - Hawaiian Vacation (2011): special thanks
- Brave (2012): animator
- Inside Out (2015): promotional animation
- The Good Dinosaur (2015): additional directing animator
- Coco (2017): supervising animator
- Toy Story 4 (2019): animator
- Soul (2020): directing animator, cultural trust
- Pixar Popcorn (2021):
  - Dory Finding (2021): animator, writer
- 22 vs. Earth (2021): animator
- SparkShorts (2021):
  - Nona (2021): animator
- Inside Out 2 (2024): additional animator
- Dream Productions (2024):
  - Part 1: The Dream Team (2024): additional animator
  - Part 2: Out of Body (2024): additional animator
  - Part 3: Romance! (2024): additional animator
  - Part 4: A Night to Remember (2024): additional animator
- Win or Lose (2025):
  - Coach's Kid (2025): animation supervisor
  - Blue (2025): animation supervisor
  - Raspberry (2025): animation supervisor
  - Pickle (2025): animation supervisor
  - Steal (2025): animation supervisor
  - Mixed Signals (2025): animation supervisor
  - I Got It (2025): animation supervisor
  - Home (2025): animation supervisor
- Hoppers (2026): crowds animation supervisor
- Toy Story 5 (2026): animator
