= Wheatables =

Brand of snack crackers

Wheatables were baked snack crackers made by the Keebler Company (a subsidiary of the Kellogg Company).

They were available in Original Golden Wheat, Toasted Honey Wheat, as well as Wheatables Nut Crisps varieties in Roasted Almond and Toasted Pecan. A Seven Grain variety was also introduced but had previously been discontinued.

Wheatables were introduced in 1988 as a healthier alternative to fried snacks. In 2003, Wheatables and the Susan G. Komen Foundation worked together on a breast cancer awareness campaign.

Wheatables were discontinued in July 2014.

== Nutritional information ==
Serving size about 19 Crackers or 1.1 ounces

=== Nutrients ===
- calories – 140 mg
- protein – 2,000.00 mg
- sugars – 5,000.00 mg
- fat – 4,000.00 mg
- carbohydrates – 22,000.00 mg
- dietary fiber – 1,000.00 mg

=== Minerals ===
- Sodium-320.00 mg

=== Fatty acids ===
- Saturated fats – 1,000.00 mg

== See also ==
- List of brand name snack foods
