= Keebler Company =

American cookie and former cracker manufacturer

- Type: Subsidiary
- Industry: Food processing
- Founded: July 19, 1853; 173 years ago Philadelphia, Pennsylvania, U.S.
- Founder: Godfrey Keebler
- Headquarters: Battle Creek, Michigan, U.S.
- Area served: Nationwide
- Products: Cookies; Crackers; Ice cream cones
- Parent: United Biscuits (1974–1995); Flowers Industries (1995–1998); Kellogg's (2001–2019); Ferrero SpA (2019–present)
- Website: keebler.com

The Keebler Company is an American cookie and former cracker manufacturer. Founded in 1853, it has produced numerous baked snacks, advertised with the Keebler Elves. Keebler had marketed its brands such as Cheez-It (which bear the Sunshine Biscuits brand), Chips Deluxe, Club Crackers, E.L. Fudge Cookies, Famous Amos, Fudge Shoppe Cookies, Murray cookies, Austin, Plantation, Vienna Fingers, Town House Crackers, Wheatables, Sandie's Shortbread, Pizzarias Pizza Chips, Chachos and Zesta Crackers, among others. Keebler slogans have included "Uncommonly Good" and "a little elfin magic goes a long way". Tom Shutter and Leo Burnett wrote the familiar jingle.

The cookie and cracker lines were separated when Kellogg's sold the cookie line and the rights of the Keebler name to Ferrero SpA in 2019. The cracker lines are now marketed under the Kellogg's or Sunshine names.

== Company history ==
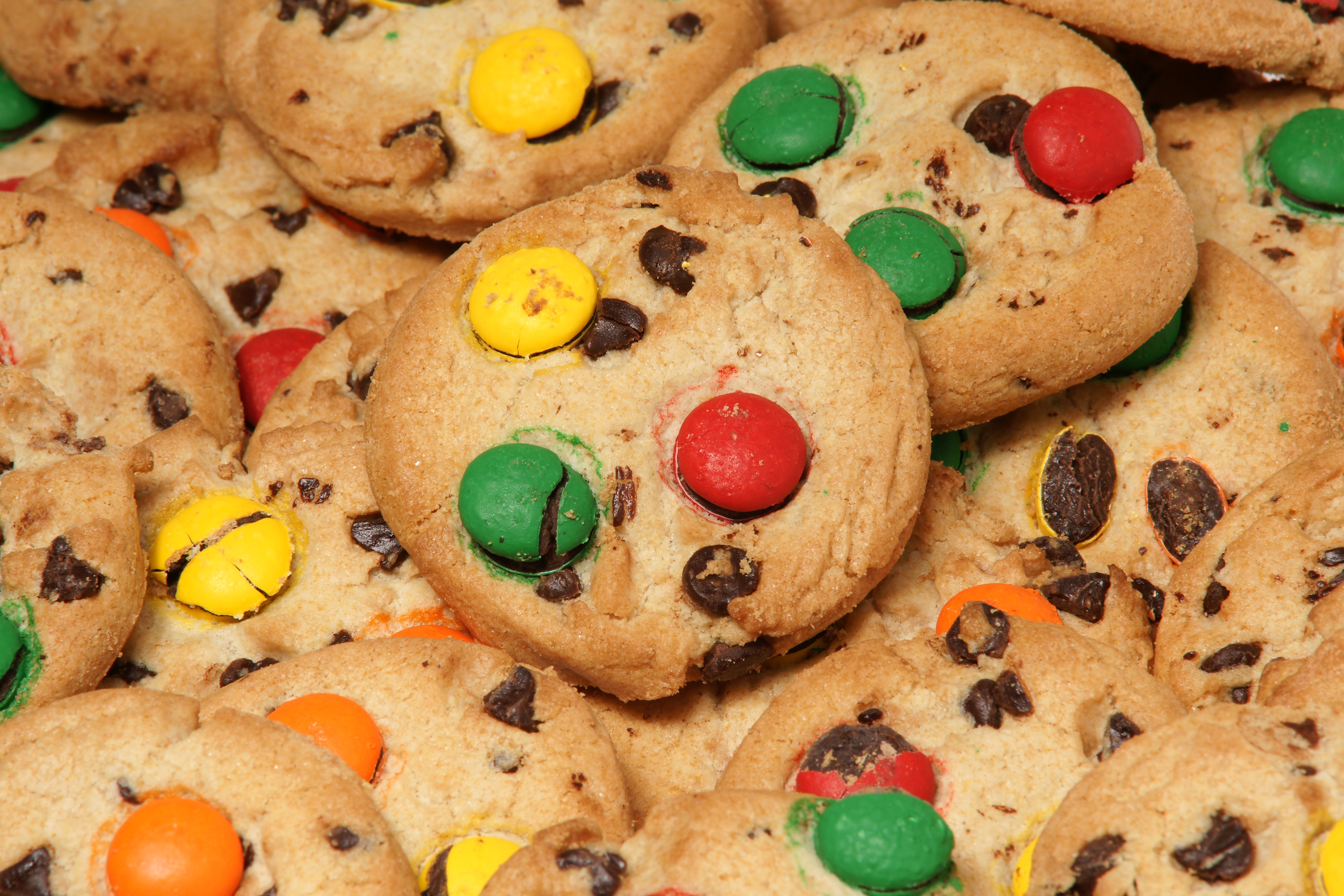
Keebler Chips Deluxe Rainbow cookies

Godfrey Keebler, of German descent, opened a bakery in Philadelphia, Pennsylvania, in 1853. His bakery networked with several other local bakeries and others around the country over the years, and in 1927 they merged into the United Biscuit Company of America.

United Biscuit operated regional bakeries which included not only Keebler, but also Hekman Biscuit Company of Grand Rapids, Michigan, the Strietmann Biscuit Company of Mariemont, Ohio, Merchants Biscuit Company of Denver, and the Bowman Biscuit Company of Denver which used the Supreme brand name. By 1963, United Biscuit introduced the Kitchen Rich brand nationally while still utilizing the regional brand names. In 1966, United Biscuit decided to adopt a uniform brand name and chose Keebler as the national brand and the name of the company.

Keebler did adopt Streitmann's Zesta saltine brand as Keebler's national brand of saltine crackers. The Zesta brand name dates back to 1926, when it was chosen as the winning entry in a naming contest held by Strietmann. Joseph B. Rosenthal of Cincinnati received the grand prize of $100 (equivalent to $1,819 in 2025) for suggesting the name "Zesta", as a replacement for Strietmann's previous brand of soda crackers, "Prize".

Keebler-Weyl Bakery became the official baker of Girl Scout Cookies in 1936, the first commercial company to bake the cookies (the scouts and their mothers had done it previously). By 1978, four companies were producing the cookies. Little Brownie Bakers is the Keebler division still licensed to produce the cookies.

In 1974, Keebler was acquired by United Biscuits, a British multinational food manufacturer, headquartered in West Drayton, Middlesex, England. By the 1980s, Keebler had expanded into the bagged salty snack market, launching a string of successful and innovative snack chips such as Tato Skins, O'Boisies, and Pizzarias. In 1995, United Biscuits announced plans to spin off the snack chip business, but ended up selling the entire company to a partnership between Flowers Industries and Artal Luxembourg, a private equity firm. Artal Luxembourg sold its holdings in Keebler in an IPO in 1998.

The Keebler Company purchased Sunshine Biscuits in 1996.

In 2000, the Keebler Company acquired a license to produce snacks based on the popular children's show Sesame Street.

In March 2001, The Keebler Company was acquired by the Kellogg Company. At that time, headquarters were located in Elmhurst, Illinois.

On April 1, 2019, Kellogg announced that it was selling Keebler cookies and other related brands to Ferrero SpA for $1.3 billion. The acquisition is a part of Ferrero's strategy to buy brands which have been neglected within broader food companies' portfolios. Kellogg retained the rights to other Keebler products, such as crackers, either under the Kellogg's or Sunshine names. The acquisition closed on July 29, 2019.

== Keebler Elves ==
The animated Keebler Elves, led by "Ernest J. 'Ernie' Keebler", rank among the best-known characters from commercials. Ernie is the head elf and the friendliest of the bunch. The elves have appeared in countless television advertisements throughout the years (most of them animated at FilmFair), shown baking their unique products. In the commercials, the Keebler tree logo is often turned into the tree in which the elves reside.

Leo Burnett Worldwide, an advertising agency, created the elves in 1968, calling the bakery "The Hollow Tree Factory."

J.J. Keebler was the original "king elf" in 1969, and was featured in a classroom film about how animated commercials are made, "Show and Sell", with J.J.'s voice performed by Alan Reed, Sr. Ernie Keebler became "head elf" in 1970. White-haired Ernie wears a green jacket, a white shirt with a yellow tie, a red vest, and floppy shoes.

Ernie Keebler was voiced by Parley Baer from 1969 until he suffered a stroke in 1997. He was followed by Walker Edmiston, who voiced the character from 1997 to 2007. Andre Stojka portrayed the character from 2007 to 2009. Richard Henzel has voiced the character since 2016.

Other elves were Fryer Tuck (who promoted "Munch-ems"), Ernie's nephews Zoot and J.J. (known for Pizzarias Pizza Chips), Ernie's mother Ma Keebler, young Elmer Keebler, Buckets (who threw fudge on the cookies), Fast Eddie (who wrapped the products), Sam (the peanut butter baker), Roger (the jeweler), Doc (the doctor and cookie maker), Zack (the fudge shoppe supervisor), Flo (the accountant), Leonardo (the artist), Elwood (who ran through the dough), Professor, Edison, Larry and Art. Frank Welker voiced a number of the Elves. Many of the Keebler commercials were narrated by the announcer Danny Dark. The first Keebler elves were drawn by children's author/illustrator and commercial artist Roger Bradfield.

== Selected products ==
Examples of Keebler products include:

- 100-Calorie Right Bites
- Chips Deluxe Chocolate Lovers cookies
- Chips Deluxe Rainbow cookies
- Dunkin Delights
- E.L. Fudge
- Grasshopper Mint & Fudge cookies
- Frosted Animals cookies
- Fudge Shoppe cookies
- Fudge Stripe Cookies
- Krunch Twists
- Keebler Ice Cream Cones
- Magic Middles
- Munch'Ems
- O’Boisies Potato Chips
- Sesame Sticks
- Pizzarias Pizza Chips
- Rich 'n' Chips
- Ready Crust® pie crusts
- Sandies cookies
- Simply Made cookies
- Sweet Spots
- Tato Skins
- Vienna Fingers cookies
