= Two Bicycles =

Studio album by Nesey Gallons
- Released: April 15, 2009
- Recorded: 2002
- Label: Hurrah for Karamazov
- Producer: Nesey Gallons

Nesey Gallons chronology
| Two Bicycles (2009) | Somewhere We Both Walk (2009) |

Two Bicycles is a self-released studio album from Maine's Nesey Gallons. It was put together in a limited edition, CD-R format of Eyes & Eyes & Eyes Ago with homemade packaging along with Somewhere We Both Walk. It was recorded when Gallons was eighteen years old.

== Track listing ==
1. "Cold Weather Bring Your Arms" – 5:03
2. "Lonesome Death" – 1:51
3. "If I Were You" – 2:36
4. "Planes Reminiscings" – 4:34
5. "Bicycle Laughing Street" – 5:25
6. "I've Been So Blue" – 7:27
7. "Januaries Januaries" – 9:10
8. "What Next What Now" – 2:57
9. "Traintrack Laughter" - 5:51
10. "Horseshoe Throwers Blues (Pianolessly)" – 4:30
11. "'Don't Go to the Ocean Without Me'" – 9:47
12. "Oh Moon" - 7:23
13. "On Sleepy Islands" - 5:17
14. "Black Clouds" - 3:52
