= Dark Cloud (activist) =

First Nations storyteller and activist

- Makadayannaquad
- Born: Aaron Quissess; December 15, 1967 (age 58); Thunder Bay, Ontario, Canada
- Occupation: Indigenous rights activist
- Website: cloudbristol.com

Dark Cloud (born December 15, 1967) is a First Nations storyteller and Sixties Scoop survivor. Dark Cloud is believed to be the sole representative of First Nation heritage residing in Bristol, England.

== Biography ==
Dark Cloud, whose birth name is Aaron Quissess, was born in the Chippewa Nation on December 15, 1967. When he was two years old, he and his sisters were taken from their mother, separated, and adopted. Dark Cloud was adopted by a British family living in Canada. In 1977, the family immigrated to Singapore, then later to Manila. Throughout his childhood, Dark Cloud frequently ran away and abused alcohol. As a teenager, he frequented "shanty towns" and lived on a private island called "white sands" making a living giving tourists boat rides.

At some point, Dark Cloud learned that his birth mother committed suicide in 1985 after her attempts to reunite with her children failed.

Dark Cloud ran away from his family and hitchhiked from a London market to Dover and then onto France before traveling throughout Europe. He tried to reconnect with his family in the 1990s, though they had returned to Oshawa, Ontario.

During his efforts at rehabilitation, he moved to a sober house in Bristol. While there, he attended the City of Bristol College to receive his General Certificate of Secondary Education, after which he studied counselling at university.

Dark Cloud later became involved in the illicit hashish trade; he was eventually arrested and received a suspended sentence in 2011. He completed 250 hours of community service at the SS Great Britain museum ship. After his conviction, he stopped all illegal activities and engaged in raising awareness around the Sixties Scoop.

In 2018, Dark Cloud returned to Canada to connect with the Ojibwe Nation and its heritage. His arrival was met with resentment from some who brand the Sixties scoop survivors as "split feathers", viewed as fortunate for escaping the oppressed and impoverished reserves. However, the elders embraced him, imparting traditional knowledge and sacred items, including an eagle feather, a blessed drum, and ceremonial tools.

== Legacy ==
Dark Cloud, 60s Scoop Survivor, a documentary about Dark Cloud's life produced by local students, was released in October 2020. It sought to shed light on his journey and the broader issues faced by Indigenous communities.

In July 2022, BBC Radio 4's William Crawley interviewed Dark Cloud, focusing on Pope Francis's visit to Canada and the Catholic Church's apology for its role in the Canadian Indian residential school system. The discussion also touched upon reconciliation efforts with the country's Indigenous peoples.

In March 2023, it was reported that artist Richard Mossman had crafted a life-sized sculpture of Dark Cloud which could be cast in bronze.
