= Karabulut =

Karabulut is a Turkish proper noun (meaning "black cloud") and may refer to:

== Places ==
- Karabulut, Akşehir
- Karabulut, Edirne
- Karabulut, Mazgirt

== Surnames ==
- Arzu Karabulut (born 1991), Turkish-German women's footballer
- Aydın Karabulut (born 1988), Turkish-German footballer
- Özkan Karabulut (born 1991), Turkish footballer
- Sadet Karabulut (born 1975), Dutch politician of Kurdish-Turkish descent
