= Pierrot the Clownfish =

French children's book

- Cover of the book
- Author: Franck Le Calvez
- Original title: Pierrot le poisson clown
- Illustrator: Robin Delpuech; Thierry Jagodzinski
- Language: French
- Genre: Children's literature
- Publisher: Éditions Flaven Scène
- Publication date: November 2002
- Publication place: France
- ISBN: 2-9519138-1-8

Pierrot the Clownfish is a French children's book by author Franck Le Calvez.

== Plot ==
Pierrot is a young clownfish living with his parents in an anemone. One day, a starfish feasts on the clownfishes' anemone, while a scorpionfish named Liona eats Pierrot's father. Pierrot's mother tells him that he is now on his own. Pierrot, who is now on his own, meets a yellow tang named Arthur, who tells the grieving clownfish to appreciate the beautiful ocean atmosphere. After failing to find a new anemone, Liona returns, forcing Pierrot to hide in a cave. He meets a family of mandarinfish, who tell Pierrot about a place called the Anemone Gardens. However, Liona's home is not very far from the Anemone Gardens. Anna, the mother mandarinfish, introduces Pierrot to a shrimp named Victor, who can help him. Victor scratches the back of a large moray eel named Mia, who agrees to keep Liona at bay while Pierrot searches for the Anemone Gardens. When Mia does not show up in time, Pierrot is chased by Liona, who is scared away by the eel. At the Anemone Gardens, Pierrot is reunited with his mother.

== Disney lawsuit ==
In 2003, Le Calvez filed suit against Pixar and its distribution company Walt Disney Pictures, claiming that the story and the characters from this book were plagiarized in the film Finding Nemo. The author and his lawyer, Pascal Kamina, demanded from Disney a share of the profits from merchandising articles sold in France. Le Calvez and Kamina lost the lawsuit on 12 March 2004 and intended to file an appeal on 5 October 2004; however, to date there has been no further action taken against Pixar on the matter.
