= Chips Deluxe =

Chocolate chips cookie brand

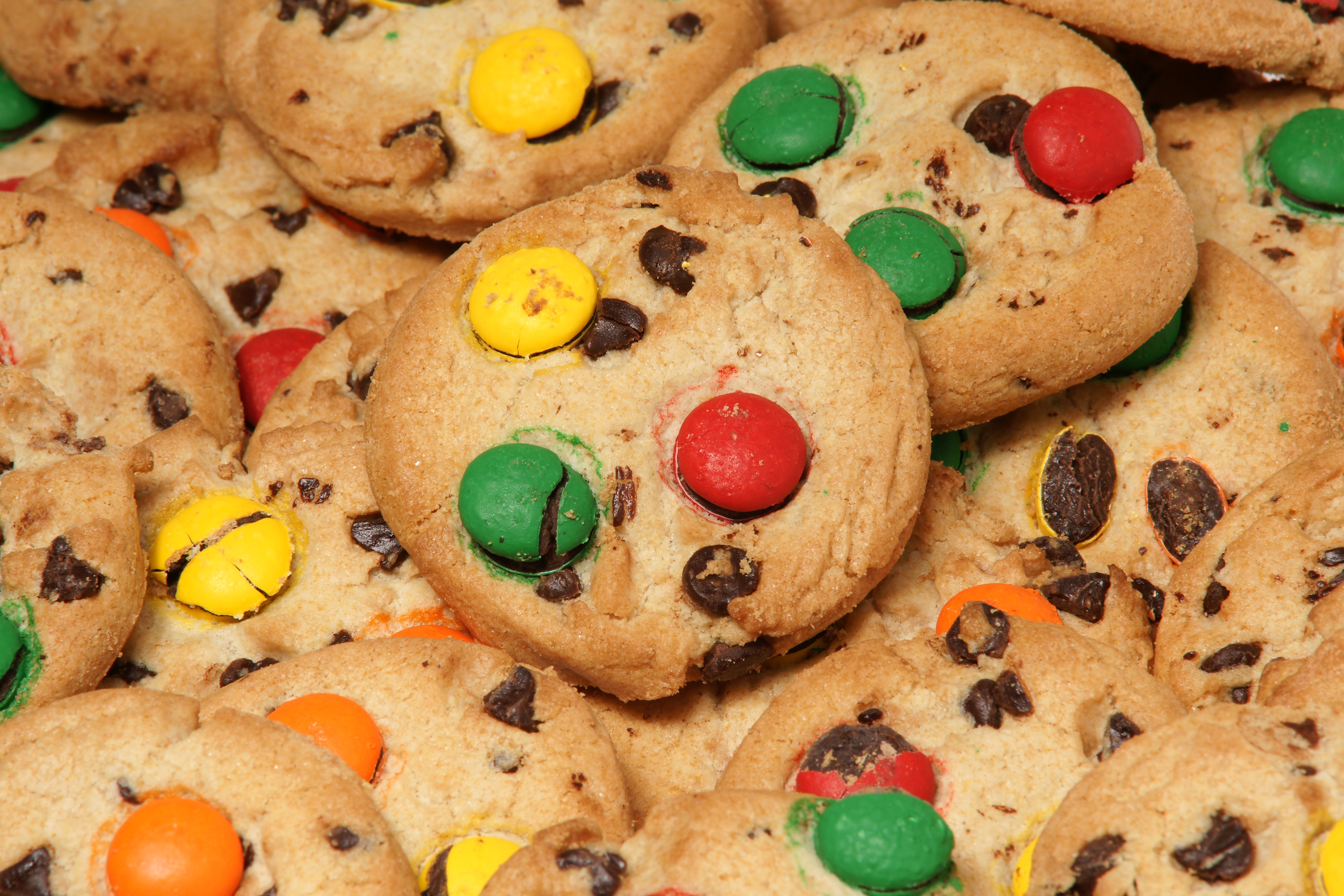
- Product type: Cookie
- Current owner: Ferrero SpA
- Produced by: Keebler
- Related brands: Chips Ahoy!
- Previous owners: Kellogg Company
- Website: keebler.com/chipsdeluxe

Chips Deluxe is a brand of cookies made by the Keebler Company (a division of the Ferrara Candy Company, itself a subsidiary of Ferrero SpA) and distributed in the United States.

== Varieties ==
Originally released as a chocolate chip cookies, the Chips Deluxe have evolved to other variations, also featuring M&M's multicolored chocolate candies.

- Original Chips Deluxe
- Rainbow Chips Deluxe
- Soft 'n' Chewy Chips Deluxe
- Chocolate Lovers Chips Deluxe
- Peanut Butter Cups Chips Deluxe
- Dark Chocolate Chunk Chips Deluxe
- Coconut Chips Deluxe
- Mini Rainbow Chips Deluxe
- Oatmeal Chips Deluxe

== See also ==
- Chips Ahoy!
