= Juliet Escoria =

American writer

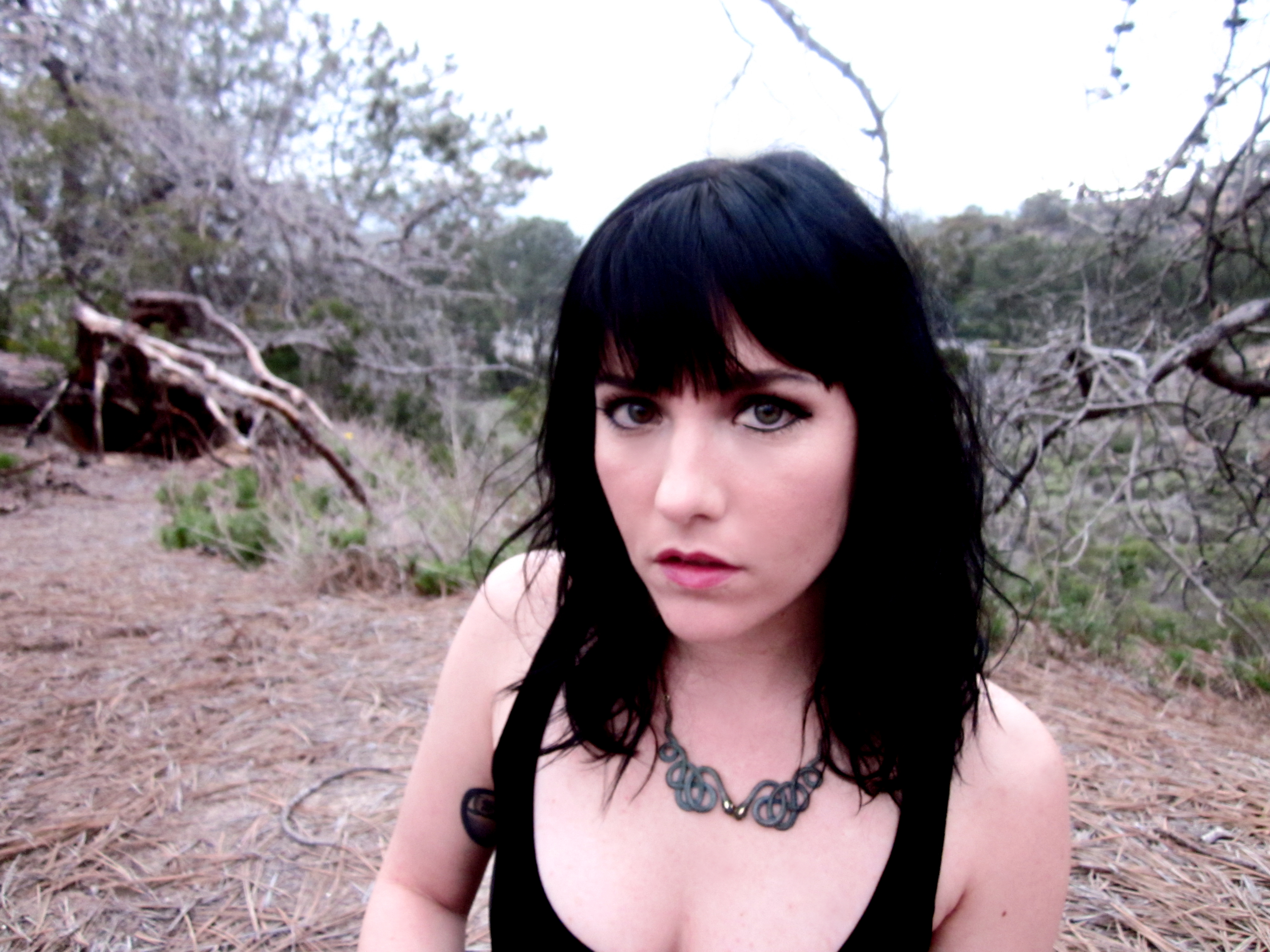
- Escoria in 2014
- Education: Brooklyn College (MFA)
- Occupations: Writer, artist
- Writing career
- Genre: Literary Fiction
- Website: julietescoria.com

Juliet Escoria is an American writer. She was born in Australia, raised in San Diego, and lives in West Virginia with her husband, the writer and martial artist Scott McClanahan.

She published a collection of stories with accompanying videos titled Black Cloud (2014). Black Cloud received positive reviews at Flavorwire, Bullet Magazine and Volume 1 Brooklyn It was mentioned in the lists of best books of 2014 at The Fader, Salon, and Flavorwire.

Escoria's work has appeared in publications such as Electric Literature, Hobart, VICE The Believer, and Guernica. Escoria holds an MFA in Fiction Writing from Brooklyn College.

Escoria also created companion videos to accompany the stories in Black Cloud.

== Critical response ==
In his positive review of Juliet the Maniac for NPR, Gabino Iglesias said, "Juliet The Maniac is a heartfelt, raw, powerfully told story about surviving mental illness and learning to cope with inner demons. Escoria is a talented writer who's not afraid to write her truth, even when it will scrape viciously at the souls of readers." In her review for The New York Times, Elizabeth Nicholas compared the novel to Sylvia Plath, Joan Didion, and Ottessa Moshfegh, adding, "Juliet Escoria’s autofictive debut novel, Juliet the Maniac, is a worthy new entry in that pantheon of deconstruction. Told in a series of fragments spanning the teenage years in which bipolar Juliet’s life unravels, it is a narrative that insists on its own severity."

== Bibliography ==
- Black Cloud (2014, Civil Coping Mechanisms)
- Witch Babies (2015, Holler Presents)
- Witch Hunt (2016, Lazy Fascist)
- Juliet the Maniac (2019, Melville House)
- You Are the Snake (2024, Soft Skull Press)
