= Dark Nebula (video game) =

- The app icon for the iOS release of Dark Nebula - Episode One
- Developer: 1337 Game Design
- Publisher: 1337 Game Design
- Platforms: iOS, Android
- Release: Episode One: August 2009; Episode Two: August 2010
- Genre: Skill-based action game

Dark Nebula is an action mobile game developed by Swedish studio 1337 Game Design for the iOS and Android. It was released in two episodes: Dark Nebula - Episode One in August 2009, and Dark Nebula - Episode Two in August 2010, which was re-released by Free Lunch Design studio with improved graphics in 2013. The soundtrack for the game was written by Calle Hansson.

== Gameplay ==
In Dark Nebula, the player's gaming device serves as a motion controller that tracks tilting motions in order to control the movement of a ball across 10 levels in Episode One and nineteen in Episode Two (excluding level twenty, which does not contain the prior movement elements). Each level is designed in a dark sci-fi style, with a variety of obstacles throughout a labyrinth (laser fire, triggering switches, spikes). There are a limited number of balls that transfer from one stage to another. For a certain number of collected yellow orbs, an extra ball is gained.

== Critical reception ==
=== Episode One ===
Noting the obscurity of the first episode, in IGN's review of Episode Two, it wrote "So, there is now an episode two of Dark Nebula. I know, you missed episode one. Now is your chance to make up for past transgressions."

=== Episode 2 ===
Dark Nebula - Episode Two has a rating of 91% on Metacritic, based on 11 critic reviews.

Slidetoplay said, "The second chapter of Dark Nebula improves on the original where improvements needed to be made. A great game just got better." Appspy wrote, "Dark Nebula - Episode 2 has developed in just the right ways to recapture what made the original so successful while building in new, exciting action elements." Gamepro wrote, "The game is clearly made by a professional, and I can't recommend it enough." ZTGD said, "I want you to reward the development team of Dark Nebula: Episode 2 with your dollar, I want them to experience the positive affirmation of your purchase. I want this app to sell well, so that they can go forth and create more awesome. Now hop to it." Pocket Gamer UK wrote, "The best of old and new wrapped up in one package, the puzzle-platformer gameplay of Dark Nebula - Episode Two is too entertaining to put down."

Multiplayer.it said "A simple but solid franchise as Dark Nebula could only give birth to a high-quality sequel, but frankly we didn't expect so many new ideas. The graphics of the game, already excellent, have been further improved and now offer levels rich in details, well defined and unique. Episode Two is immediate and entertaining as Episode One, the tilt controls are very accurate and the action is characterized by a continuous introduction of new challenges to overcome. A must buy." Touchgen said "Dark Nebula Episode Two is a triumph of budget game design on the AppStore." 148apps wrote "We loved Dark Nebula: Episode One, but were saddened by its length - Episode Two "only" has twenty levels, but they're all fantastic." IGN said "Bring on episode three. Dark Nebula is a frenzied tilt game that bangs you over the head every stage with new challenges like laser tripwires, twirling blades, tricky jumps, and boss battles." Eurogamer said "Hours are casually tossed aside in the process of ensuring that a ball safely reaches its destination, via moving walkways, spiked traps, bounce pads, industrial crushers and laser fire."

Episode Two was re-released with improved graphics and 23 levels as Dark Nebula HD by Free Lunch Design studio in 2013.

For unknown reasons, it was taken down from the iPhone and iPad AppStore.

By August 4, 2022, it was no longer available in the Google Play store.
