= Kyiv Biennial =

Art forum

Kyiv Biennial Київська бієнале
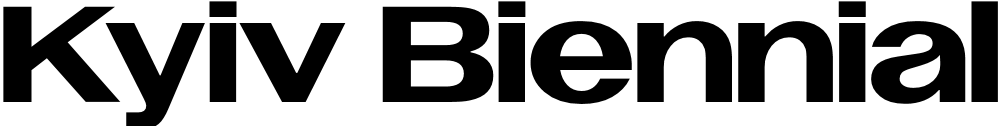
- Genre: Contemporary art biennale
- Begins: 2015
- Frequency: Every two years
- Location(s): Kyiv, Ukraine
- Website: https://kyivbiennial.org/en

Kyiv Biennial is an international contemporary art biennale, held every two years in Kyiv, Ukraine. First edition of the event was held in 2015. Since its beginning Kyiv Biennial is organized by the Visual Culture Research Center.

In 2019, Kyiv Biennial became a member of Alliance of Eastern European Biennales along with Prague Biennale Matter of Art, Biennale Warszawa, Budapest OFF-Biennale and Riga Survival Kit Festival.

== History ==
Kyiv Biennial was founded in 2015, with its first event "The School of Kyiv", being held on 8 September 2015, with its main venue being The House of Clothes in Central Kyiv. Structurally it included six "schools" – conceptual platforms created to promote the dialogue between Ukrainian and international artists, intellectuals, and the public. In the spring of 2016, in collaboration with various European cultural institutions, The School of Kyiv expanded, with its departments being opened in more than 8 cities across Europe. Overall, around 70 artists took place in the event.

The second edition of the event "Kyiv International" was held from 20 October to 26 November 2017 in the building of State Scientific and Technical Library of Ukraine. Its main theme was exploration of European politics and the ideas of internationalism. Structurally the event was divided into 8 projects. In May 2018, the second part of this event took place, "Kyiv International – '68 TODAY", timed to the 50th anniversary of the May riots of 1968.

The third Kyiv Biennial, "Black Cloud", was held from 10 October to 23 November 2019. It focused on the themes of political and cultural role of modern information technologies, as well as social transformations that have happened in Eastern Europe over the past three decades. The event was held in the building of Scientific and Technical Library of Igor Sikorsky Kyiv Polytechnic Institute.

The fourth Kyiv Biennial, "Allied", was held from 16 October to 14 November 2021 in the House of Cinema building in Kyiv. The main focus of the event was collaboration between art communities of Eastern Europe.

The fifth edition of Kyiv Biennial was international, and took place in Kyiv, Ivano-Frankivsk, Uzhhorod, Vienna, Warsaw and Berlin starting in October 2023, finishing in 2024.
