= Wall unit =

Furniture fixed to an internal wall of a room

Empty built-in wall unit

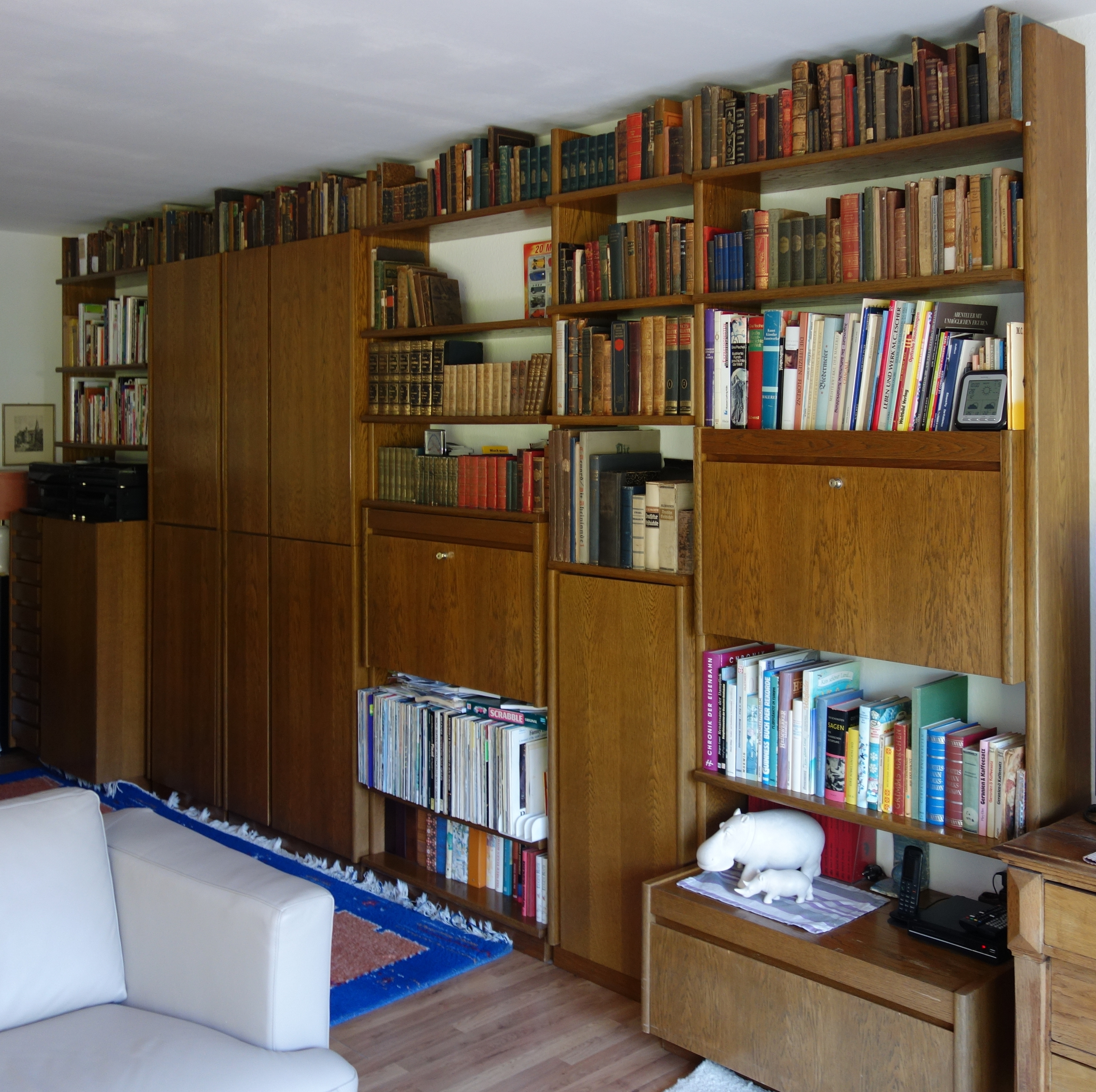
Equipped wall unit (Cologne, 1977)

A wall unit is a premanufactured item of furniture. It is an assembly of several discrete components that are fixed to an internal wall of a room. Wall unit fixtures range in style from contemporary to traditional in order to match the decor of the home or business establishment in which they are installed. The furnishings are generally customized per installation at request of the customer to ensure the best fit and integration.

Wall units are often made from oak, maple, yellow cedar, padauk, American and European beech, purpleheart, alder and cherry. Some companies combine solid and wood veneers or use MDF or particle board to create wall units that normally have amendable shelves. But aside from using wood, metal and glass can also be employed in their manufacture. Wall units are convenient for builders in that they can be easily installed. This kind of furniture can be utilised as storage, provide a surface for food preparation or to house whitegoods in kitchens, as entertainment centres for television or audio equipment or have many other household or office uses.
