= 1968 in animation =

Events in 1968 in animation.

== Events ==
=== February ===
- February 12: The first episode of The Herbs airs.
- February 14: The Peanuts TV special He's Your Dog, Charlie Brown premieres on CBS.

=== March ===
- March 9: Alex Lovy's Speedy Gonzales and Daffy Duck cartoon Skyscraper Caper premieres, produced by Warner Bros.-Seven Arts Animation.

=== April ===
- April 10: 40th Academy Awards: The Box by Fred Wolf wins the Academy Award for Best Animated Short.
- April 29: The first episode of Les Shadoks airs.

=== June ===
- June 29: Alex Lovy's cartoon See Ya Later Gladiator premieres, produced by Warner Bros.-Seven Arts Animation. It marks the final appearances of Daffy Duck and Speedy Gonzales in the original Looney Tunes/Merrie Melodies series.

=== July ===
- July 17: George Dunning's animated feature based on The Beatles, Yellow Submarine, is first released. The innovative designs are done by Heinz Edelmann.

=== September ===
- September 7: The Road Runner Show airs solely for the final time on CBS, as the show would become merged with ABC's The Bugs Bunny Show the following week to become The Bugs Bunny/Road Runner Hour.
- September 8: The Bugs Bunny Show ends its first run on ABC as the show would move over to CBS and be merged with the The Road Runner Show to become The Bugs Bunny/Road Runner Hour.
- September 14:
  - The first episode of Hanna-Barbera's Wacky Races airs. It marks the debut of Penelope Pitstop and villainous characters Dick Dastardly and Muttley the dog.
  - The first episode of The Batman/Superman Hour airs.
  - The first episode of The Archie Show airs.
- September 29: The first episode of Joe 90 airs.

=== October ===
- October 31: Bruno Bozzetto's VIP, mio fratello superuomo premieres.

=== December ===
- December 6: Per Åhlin and Tage Danielsson's Out of an Old Man's Head premieres which mixes live-action with animation.
- December 19: Belvision releases the second Astérix film, Asterix and Cleopatra.
- December 23: Roberto Gavioli's The Magic Bird premieres.

=== Specific date unknown ===
- The first episode of The Mézga Family airs.
- Ray Goossens's animated TV series Musti first airs.
- Eleven classic animated shorts are banned from broadcasting: the Censored Eleven.
- Pringles' mascot makes a brief animated appearance in the Pringles ads during the chip's marketing debut.

== Films released ==
- January 1 - Sun Wukong (South Korea)
- March 19 - The World of Hans Christian Andersen (Japan)
- July 17 - Yellow Submarine (United Kingdom)
- July 21 - The Great Adventure of Horus, Prince of the Sun (Japan)
- July 25 - The Golden Iron Man (South Korea)
- October 19 - Tobimaru and the Nine-tailed Fox (Japan)
- October 31 - The SuperVips (Italy)
- November 23 - The Mouse on the Mayflower (United States and Japan)
- December 6 - Out of an Old Man's Head (Sweden)
- December 19 - Asterix and Cleopatra (Belgium and France)
- December 22 - The Mickey Mouse Anniversary Show (United States)
- December 23 - The Magic Bird (Italy)
- Specific date unknown - Adam 2 (West Germany)

== Television series ==
- January 3 - GeGeGe no Kitaro debuts on Fuji TV.
- February 1 - Wanpaku Tankentai debuts on Fuji TV.
- February 12 - The Herbs debuts on BBC1.
- March 30 - Star of the Giants debuts on Yomiuri Television.
- April 1 - Animal 1 debuts on Fuji TV.
- April 4 - Akane-chan debuts on Fuji TV.
- April 5 - Cyborg 009 debuts on NET.
- April 6 - Fight Da!! Pyûta debuts on Mainichi Hôso.
- April 21 - Kaibutsu-kun debuts on TBS.
- April 29 - Les Shadoks debuts on ORTF.
- September 3 - Sasuke debuts on TBS.
- September 7 - Arabian Knights, The Banana Splits Adventure Hour, and The Three Musketeers debut on NBC.
- September 14:
  - Fantastic Voyage and The Adventures of Gulliver debut on ABC.
  - The Adventures of Batman, The Archie Show, The Batman/Superman Hour, and Wacky Races debut on CBS.
- September 15 - The New Adventures of Huckleberry Finn debuts on NBC.
- September 29 - Joe 90 debuts on ATV.
- September 30 - Yuuyake Banchō debuts on Nippon Television.
- October 2 - Dokachin debuts on Fuji TV.
- October 3 - Sabu to Ichi Torimono Hikae debuts on NET and MBS.
- October 5 - The Vampires debuts on Fuji TV.
- October 7 - Yôkai Ningen Bem debuts on Fuji TV.
- November 9 - Micro Ventures debuts on NBC.
- Specific date unknown - Mézga család debuts on M1, M2, and Minimax.

== Births ==
=== January ===
- January 2: Cuba Gooding Jr., American actor (voice of Buck in Home on the Range, Loofah in The Land Before Time XIII: The Wisdom of Friends).
- January 4: Marc Ceccarelli, American animator (The Haunted World of El Superbeasto), storyboard artist (Phineas and Ferb, The Drinky Crow Show, Uncle Grandpa), writer (Phineas and Ferb, Uncle Grandpa), director and producer (SpongeBob SquarePants, Kamp Koral: SpongeBob's Under Years, The Patrick Star Show).
- January 9: Joey Lauren Adams, American actress (voice of Catt in Stripperella, Rachel in the What's New, Scooby-Doo? episode "A Scooby-Doo Valentine", Electra in the Hercules episode "Hercules and the Complex Electra").
- January 12:
  - Farrah Forke, American actress (voice of Big Barda/Barda Free in Batman Beyond and Justice League Unlimited, herself in the Duckman episode "Aged Heat 2: Women in Heat"), (d. 2022).
  - Rachel Harris, American actress and comedian (voice of Deanna in Wreck-It Ralph, Female Knight in Serial Experiments Lain, A.L.E.X. in Frisky Dingo, Adam's Date in The Life & Times of Tim, Melissa in the Glenn Martin, DDS episode "Step-Brother", Cardigan Burke in the BoJack Horseman episode "Hank After Dark", Margalo in the Stuart Little episode "A Model Driver").
- January 15: Chad Lowe, American actor (voice of Captain Marvel in Young Justice, Cosmic Boy in the Superman: The Animated Series episode "New Kids in Town", Wade Pennington in The Zeta Project episode "Crime Waves").
- January 19: Matt Hill, Canadian actor (voice of the title character in Captain N: The Game Master, Ed in Ed, Edd n Eddy, Ryo Sanada in Ronin Warriors, Kero in Cardcaptors, Bankotsu in InuYasha, Kira Yamamoto in Gundam Seed, Tyler Bowman in Supernoobs).
- January 20: Chris Miller, American animator, storyboard artist, actor, writer and director (DreamWorks Animation).
- January 28:
  - DJ Muggs, American DJ, audio engineer, record producer and member of Cypress Hill (voiced himself in The Simpsons episode "Homerpalooza").
  - Glenn Slater, American lyricist (Walt Disney Animation Studios).
- January 30: Donovan Cook, American cartoonist and director (2 Stupid Dogs, Nightmare Ned, Mickey Mouse Clubhouse).
- January 31: Tracy Berna, American television writer (The Mask, The Adventures of Sam & Max: Freelance Police, Disney Television Animation, Sonic Underground, Sabrina: The Animated Series, Nickelodeon Animation Studio, Gladiator Academy, Make Way for Noddy, The Invisible Man, George of the Jungle, Action Dad).

=== February ===
- February 1: Pauly Shore, American actor, comedian and filmmaker (voice of George in Bobby's World, Bobby Zimmeruski in A Goofy Movie and An Extremely Goofy Movie, Snivel in Casper: A Spirited Beginning, The Oracle in Casper Meets Wendy, MIC-MIC in The Big Trip, Pinocchio in Pinocchio: A True Story, Deejay in the King of the Hill episode "Escape from Party Island", Justin in the Father of the Pride episode "One Man's Meat Is Another Man's Girlfriend", Johnny Blowhole in the Star vs. the Forces of Evil episode "The Bounce Lounge", Pat in the Animals episode "Squirrels.", Prince Jan Roll in The Midnight Gospel episode "Blinded By My End", himself in the Futurama episode "The Cryonic Woman").
- February 4: Theodore Ushev, Bulgarian animator, film director and screenwriter (Tower Bawher, Drux Flux, Lipsett Diaries, Demoni, Gloria Victoria, The Sleepwalker, Blind Vaysha, The Physics of Sorrow).
- February 6: Erik Moxcey, American animator (The Simpsons) and storyboard artist (The Story of Santa Claus, The Simpsons, Rugrats, As Told by Ginger, Family Guy).
- February 8: Gary Coleman, American actor and comedian (voice of Andy Le Beau in The Gary Coleman Show, Kevin and 42nd Street in Waynehead, various characters in Robot Chicken, voiced himself in The Simpsons episodes "Grift of the Magi", "A Tale of Two Springfields" and "Day of the Jackanapes", and Night of the Living Doo), (d. 2010).
- February 11: Mo Willems, American children's author and illustrator (Creator of The Pigeon series and Elephant & Piggie), animator (Sesame Street, creator of The Off-Beats and Sheep in the Big City), storyboard artist, television writer (Sesame Street, Big Bag, Codename: Kids Next Door, LazyTown), director, producer and voice actor (voice of September and Grubby Groo in The Off-Beats, Angry Scientist in Sheep in the Big City and The Pigeon in the animated adaptations of The Pigeon books).
- February 13: Kelly Hu, American actress (voice of Stacy Hirano in Phineas and Ferb, Karai in Teenage Mutant Ninja Turtles, Adira in Tangled: The Series, Cheshire, Paula Crock and Lian Nguyen-Harper in Young Justice, Sha Shan Nguyen in The Spectacular Spider-Man, Lady Shiva in Batman: Soul of the Dragon, Okiku in the Afro Samurai episode "The Dream Reader").
- February 16: Warren Ellis, English comic book and television writer (Marvel Anime, Castlevania, G.I. Joe: Resolute).
- February 17: Aaron Blaise, American painter, animator, film director and art instructor (Brother Bear).
- February 24:
  - Eric Coleman, American television producer (Nickelodeon Animation Studio, Disney Television Animation).

=== March ===
- March 1: Kat Cressida, American voice actress (voice of Dee Dee in Dexter's Laboratory, Kala in Tarzan, Natsuki "Natalie" Mogi in Initial D, Mrs. Darling in Tinker Bell, Uta in Archer, Portia in the Jackie Chan Adventures episode "Into the Mouth of Evil", additional voices in Men in Black: The Series, The Cat Returns, Phineas and Ferb, and Solar Opposites).
- March 2: Fumi Kitahara, American animation publicist (DreamWorks Animation, Aardman Animations, Laika LLC, Walt Disney Animation Studios), (d. 2025).
- March 4: Kazuto Nakazawa, Japanese character designer and director (Samurai Champloo).
- March 6: Moira Kelly, American actress (voice of Nala in The Lion King franchise).
- March 10: Philip Anthony-Rodriguez, American actor (voice of Mano in Justice League vs. the Fatal Five, Fifth Brother in Star Wars Rebels, Furnish Repairman in the Higglytown Heroes episode "All Warm Inside").
- March 11: Lisa Loeb, American singer-songwriter, musician author and actress (voice of Mary Jane Watson in Spider-Man: The New Animated Series, Winger in Jake and the Neverland Pirates, Newborn Baby in The Rugrats Movie, Laura in Firebuds, Millie the Microphone in the Doc McStuffins episode "A Good Case of the Hiccups" and Princess Leia in the Robot Chicken episode "May Cause Random Wolf Attacks").
- March 12: Aaron Eckhart, American actor (voice of Cary Duval in Pantheon).
- March 17: Mathew St. Patrick, American actor (voice of Skulker in season 1 of Danny Phantom, Policeman Hero in Higglytown Heroes).
- March 21: Greg Ellis, English actor (voice of Rocket Raccoon in The Avengers: Earth's Mightiest Heroes, Gentleman Ghost in Batman: The Brave and the Bold, Jet-Vac in Skylanders Academy, Mzingo in The Lion Guard, Manfred in Star vs. the Forces of Evil, Synaptak in Ben 10 and Ben 10: Alien Force, Malchior in the Teen Titans episode "Spellbound", Drax in the Legion of Super Heroes episode "Phantoms").
- March 25: Michael Reisz, American actor (voice of Mizuki in Naruto, Colin Weasler in The Mummy, Matt Ishida in the Digimon franchise, Kevin Levin in the Ben 10 episode "Kevin 11").
- March 26:
  - James Iha, American rock musician, guitarist, and member of The Smashing Pumpkins (voiced himself in The Simpsons episode "Homerpalooza").
  - Sue Perrotto, American animator (MTV Animation, Buster & Chauncey's Silent Night, Sheep in the Big City), storyboard artist (Arthur's Missing Pal, Phineas and Ferb, Phineas and Ferb the Movie: Across the 2nd Dimension, Miles from Tomorrowland), character designer (Downtown), lip sync artist (Celebrity Deathmatch, Codename: Kids Next Door), sheet timer (Winnie the Pooh: Springtime with Roo, Pooh's Heffalump Movie, Squirrel Boy, Chowder, The Mighty B!, Disney Television Animation), writer (Phineas and Ferb the Movie: Across the 2nd Dimension) and director (Daria, Celebrity Deathmatch, Sheep in the Big City, Cartoon Network Studios, Phineas and Ferb, Miles from Tomorrowland, Mira, Royal Detective).
- March 28: Merriwether Williams, American television writer (Nickelodeon Animation Studio, Free For All, Camp Lazlo, Adventure Time, Johnny Test, Pound Puppies, My Little Pony: Friendship Is Magic, Littlest Pet Shop, Billy Dilley's Super-Duper Subterranean Summer).
- March 29: Lucy Lawless, New Zealand actress and singer (voice of Xena in Hercules and Xena - The Animated Movie: The Battle for Mount Olympus, Wonder Woman in Justice League: The New Frontier, Bera in Mosley, Tzod in The Spine of Night, Nun-chuck in Minions: The Rise of Gru, Aeosian Queen in Star Wars Resistance, Stacy in the American Dad! episode "A Piñata Named Desire", General Tarsal in the Adventure Time episode "Dentist", Hiidrala in the Teenage Mutant Ninja Turtles episode "The Cosmic Ocean", Mimi O'Malley in the Big City Greens episode "Cricket's Tickets", herself in The Simpsons episode "Treehouse of Horror X" and the Celebrity Deathmatch episode "The Return of Lucy Lawless").
- March 30: Celine Dion, Canadian singer (singing voice of Juliana in Quest for Camelot).

=== April ===
- April 1: Christine Lawrence Finney, American painter and animator (Walt Disney Animation Studios), (d. 2016).
- April 3: Sebastian Bach, Canadian-American singer (voice of Martian Manhunter in the Robot Chicken episode "They Took My Thumbs", Triton in the SpongeBob SquarePants episode "The Clash of Triton").
- April 15:
  - Ed O'Brien, English guitarist, songwriter and member of Radiohead (voiced himself in the South Park episode "Scott Tenorman Must Die").
  - Andrew Brandou, American background artist (The Simpsons, Nickelodeon Animation Studio), color stylist (The Simpsons, Klasky Csupo, The Angry Beavers, Adelaide Productions, Ni Hao, Kai-Lan, The Cleveland Show, American Dad!, Family Guy) and art director (Ni Hao, Kai-Lan).
- April 20: J.D. Roth, American actor (voice of the title character in season 1 of The Real Adventures of Jonny Quest, young Santa Claus in The Life and Adventures of Santa Claus).
- April 26: Angela C. Santomero, American television writer (Gullah Gullah Island, Sesame Street) and producer (creator of Super Why!, Daniel Tiger's Neighborhood, Creative Galaxy, Wishenpoof! and Charlie's Colorforms City, co-creator of Blue's Clues).

=== May ===
- May 1: D'arcy Wretzky, American musician and member of The Smashing Pumpkins (voiced herself in The Simpsons episode "Homerpalooza").
- May 7: Lance Wilder, American animator and background designer (The Simpsons, Histeria!, Rugrats, Mission Hill).
- May 11: Jeffrey Donovan, American actor (voice of Steve Trevor in Wonder Woman: Bloodlines, Machine Head in the Invincible episode "That Actually Hurt").
- May 12: Tony Hawk, American professional skateboarder and entrepreneur (voice of Hush in Kick Buttowski: Suburban Daredevil, Flame in Skylanders Academy, the title character in the Middlemost Post episode "Hawk Man", Coop in the Cyberchase episode "Measure for Measure", himself in Tony Hawk in Boom Boom Sabotage, the Rocket Power episode "Enter the Hawk-Trix", The Simpsons episode "Barting Over", and The Casagrandes episode "Skaters Gonna Hate").
- May 13: Paul Tibbitt, American actor, animator, storyboard artist (Itsy Bitsy Spider, Nightmare Ned, Recess), writer and director (SpongeBob SquarePants).
- May 14: Greg Davies, Welsh actor (voice of Balloon Man in Teen Titans Go! To the Movies, Centurion in Asterix: The Mansions of the Gods).
- May 20: Timothy Olyphant, American actor (voice of the Spirit of the West in Rango, Willard Stenk in Missing Link, Lucas Troy in the Archer episode "The Wind Cries Mary", Nowell in the American Dad! episode "Klaus and Rogu in Thank God for Loose Rocks: An American Dad! Adventure", Coop in the Rick and Morty episode "Rick & Morty's Thanksploitation Spectacular", Sheriff Flanders in The Simpsons episode "A Serious Flanders", Wade in The Great North episode "Beef's in Toyland Adventure").

=== June ===
- June 10: Bill Burr, American comedian, actor, podcaster, writer and director (voice of Squirtle in Leo, Frank Murphy in F Is for Family, Boston Football Fan in The Simpsons episode "The Town", Butch in Puppy Dog Pals and Pastor Nick Saint Angelo in the Barry episode "the wizard").
- June 20: Robert Rodriguez, American songwriter, composer, photographer, editor, producer, screenwriter and director, (Spy Kids: Mission Critical, UglyDolls, voiced himself in The Cleveland Show episode "Hot Cocoa Bang Bang", and the Uncle Grandpa episode "New Direction").
- June 28: Isshin Chiba, Japanese voice actor (voice of Chiba in Case Closed, Shining Knight in .hack//Sign, Japanese dub voice of Trigon in Teen Titans and Teen Titans Go! and Etrigan the Demon in Batman: The Brave and the Bold).

=== July ===
- July 7: Danny Jacobs, American actor and comedian (voice of King Julien in The Penguins of Madagascar and All Hail King Julien, Rowdy Remington in Kick Buttowski: Suburban Daredevil, Baron Mordo in Ultimate Spider-Man, Starbox in Animaniacs, additional voices in Futurama and Olive, the Other Reindeer).
- July 8: Billy Crudup, American actor (voice of Ashitaka in the English dub of Princess Mononoke).
- July 11: Conrad Vernon, American animator, writer (Rocko's Modern Life), director (Dreamworks Animation, Sausage Party, The Addams Family), storyboard artist (Rocko's Modern Life, 2 Stupid Dogs, Nightmare Ned), and actor (voice of Gingerbread Man in the Shrek franchise).
- July 15: Eddie Griffin, American actor and comedian (voice of Richard Pryor in the Black Dynamite episode "Taxes and Death or Get Him to the Sunset Strip", himself in The Boondocks episode "Good Times").
- July 17:
  - Joshua Seftel, American filmmaker, producer and director (Fetch! with Ruff Ruffman).
  - Beth Littleford, American actress (voice of Sandra Tennyson in the Ben 10 franchise, Mrs. Stapleton in The Cleveland Show).
- July 18:
  - Mark O'Hare, American animator, storyboard artist, writer and director (Rocko's Modern Life, SpongeBob SquarePants, Camp Lazlo).
  - Alex Désert, American actor and musician (voice of Nick Fury in Wolverine and the X-Men and The Avengers: Earth's Mightiest Heroes, Skelly in Lego: The Adventures of Clutch Powers, Wise in The LeBrons, Sam the Snake in Doc McStuffins, Steam and Carry in The Stinky & Dirty Show, Jefferson Davis / Swarm in Spider-Man, Mr. Bojenkins in Mr. Pickles and Momma Named Me Sheriff, Crawfish King and Waiter in the Carmen Sandiego episode "The Haunted Bayou Caper", continued voice of Carl Carlson and Lou in The Simpsons).
- July 23: Mr. Warburton, American animator (Doug, Saturday TV Funhouse), character designer (Pepper Ann), writer (Fish Hooks) and producer (The 7D, Muppet Babies, creator of Codename: Kids Next Door).
- July 24: Kristin Chenoweth, American actress (voice of Princess Skystar in My Little Pony: The Movie, Rosetta in the Disney Fairies franchise, Gabi in Rio 2, Fifi in The Peanuts Movie, Abby in The Star).
- July 27:
  - Julian McMahon, Australian-American actor (voice of Doctor Doom in the Robot Chicken episode "Monstourage"), (d. 2025).
  - Glen Murakami, American television producer and animator (Warner Bros. Animation).
- July 30: Terry Crews, American actor and television host (voice of Earl Devereaux in Cloudy with a Chance of Meatballs 2, Tentacular in Rumble, Blade in Ultimate Spider-Man and Hulk and the Agents of S.M.A.S.H., Duane Williams in Craig of the Creek).

=== August ===
- August 4: Daniel Dae Kim, American actor (voice of King Micah in seasons 3-5 of She-Ra and the Princesses of Power, Chief Benja in Raya and the Last Dragon, Metron in Justice League Unlimited, Great-Grandfather in Mirai, Hirosi Sato in The Legend of Korra, David in Pantheon, Teddy Lee in the G.I. Joe: Renegades episode "The Anomaly", General Fong in the Avatar: The Last Airbender episode "The Avatar State").
- August 5: Christopher Tyng, American composer (Futurama, Olive, the Other Reindeer, Game Over).
- August 8: Kimberly Brooks, American actress (voice of Mee Mee in Dexter's Laboratory, Luna in the Scooby-Doo franchise, Buena Girl, Snow Pea and Cindy Slam in ¡Mucha Lucha!, Mom in Doc McStuffins, Jasper in Steven Universe, Princess Allura in Voltron: Legendary Defender, Bumblebee in DC Super Hero Girls, Puff and Madelyn Spaulding in Static Shock, Stormy in Winx Club, Princess Looma Red Wind in Ben 10: Omniverse, Teela in He-Man and the Masters of the Universe, Echo in Oddballs, Lewis Clark and Toby in The Simpsons, Shuri in the Avengers Assemble episode "The Eye of Agamotto - Part One").
- August 9:
  - Eric Bana, Australian actor and comedian (voice of Anchor in Finding Nemo, Damien Popodopolous in Mary and Max, Chaz Hunt in Back to the Outback, Monterey Jack in Chip 'n Dale Rescue Rangers, magistrate in Memoir of a Snail).
  - Gillian Anderson, American actress (voice of Moro in Princess Mononoke, Miki Hokuto in From Up on Poppy Hill, Witch in Room on the Broom, the Narrator in Ronja, the Robber's Daughter, Dana Scully in the Eek! the Cat episode "Eek Space-9" and The Simpsons episode "The Springfield Files", Data Nully in the ReBoot episode "Trust No One", Fairy Godmother, Fiona and Baroness in the Robot Chicken episode "Up, Up, and Buffet").
- August 16: Andy Milder, American actor (voice of Lightning Lad in Legion of Super Heroes, Flash in Batman: The Brave and the Bold, Quillfire in Transformers: Robots in Disguise, Steven Spielberg in the Animaniacs episode "Jurassic Lark").
- August 17: Helen McCrory, English actress (voice of Mrs. Bean in Fantastic Mr. Fox, Lucy Fletcher in Phineas and Ferb), (d. 2021).
- August 21:
  - Cory Edwards, American animator, director and actor (Hoodwinked!).
  - Scott Moot, American background artist (King of the Hill, Eloise: The Animated Series, Futurama, Bob's Burgers, Central Park).
- August 28: Billy Boys, Scottish actor and musician (voice of Shank in The Lord of the Rings: The War of the Rohirrim, Malachite in the Sofia the First episode "The Crown of Blossoms", Garmelie in The Legend of Vox Machina, Scott in The Loud House Movie, Seamus in Dog Man, Edgar in the Kung Fu Panda: The Dragon Knight episode "The Bog-ey Man of Festermouth", The Overseer in The Wingfeather Saga, himself in The Simpsons episode "The Serfsons").

=== September ===
- September 2: Orlando Gumatay, American animator (Biker Mice from Mars, The Land Before Time VI: The Secret of Saurus Rock, Boo Boo Runs Wild, Film Roman, Futurama, Looney Tunes), storyboard artist (The Cleveland Show, The LeBrons, Family Guy) and director (The Prince).
- September 4: John DiMaggio, American actor (voice of Bender in Futurama, Dr. Drakken in Kim Possible, Jake the Dog in Adventure Time, The Scotsman in Samurai Jack, Aquaman in Batman: The Brave and the Bold, Brother Blood in Teen Titans and Teen Titans Go!, Zombozo, Aggregor, Will Harangue, Octagon Vreedle, and various other characters in the Ben 10 franchise, Bobo Haha in Generator Rex).
- September 8: Simon J. Smith, English animator, director, visual effects artist and actor.
- September 9:
  - Julia Sawalha, English actress (voice of Mouse in Kipper, Ginger in Chicken Run, Georgina in Sheeep).
  - Randy Ludensky, American animation checker (Hulk and the Agents of S.M.A.S.H., Avengers Assemble) and sheet timer (Adelaide Productions, Warner Bros. Animation, Film Roman, American Dad!, Kim Possible, Ben 10, Ni Hao, Kai-Lan, Curious George, G.I. Joe: Renegades, Bob's Burgers, Allen Gregory, Brickleberry, Guardians of the Galaxy, DreamWorks Animation Television, Spider-Man, Duncanville, Central Park, HouseBroken).
- September 11: Dave Wasson, American animator (Mighty Mouse: The New Adventures, The New Adventures of Beany and Cecil, Cool World, Space Jam), storyboard artist, character designer (Clone High, Nickelodeon Animation Studio), prop designer (My Life as a Teenage Robot), voice actor, writer, director and producer (Oh Yeah! Cartoons, Disney Television Animation, Making Fiends, The Cuphead Show!, creator of Time Squad).
- September 12:
  - Mark Andrews, American film director, screenwriter, and animator (Pixar).
  - Paul F. Tompkins, American actor and comedian (voice of Mr. Peanutbutter in BoJack Horseman, Shorty in the Tangled franchise, Gladstone Gander in DuckTales, Blue Morpho in The Venture Bros., Randy in King of the Hill, Magilla Gorilla and the Funky Phantom in Jellystone!).
- September 20: Ben Edlund, American cartoonist and screenwriter (Titan A.E., The Venture Bros., Star Wars: The Clone Wars, creator of The Tick).
- September 21: David Jolicoeur, American musician and member of De La Soul (voiced himself in the Teen Titans Go! episode "Don't Press Play"), (d. 2023).
- September 22: Megan Hollingshead, American voice actress (voice of Mai Valentine in Yu-Gi-Oh! Duel Monsters, Nurse Joy in Pokémon, Rangiku Matsumoto in Bleach, Shizune in Naruto, Villetta Nu in Code Geass).
- September 25: Will Smith, American actor, rapper, producer and internet personality (voice of Oscar in Shark Tale, Lance Sterling in Spies in Disguise, Pinocchio in the Happily Ever After: Fairy Tales for Every Child episode "Pinocchio").

=== October ===
- October 5: Natasha Kopp, American television producer (Disney Television Animation).
- October 6: John Mathot, American animator, storyboard artist (The Simpsons, Klutter!, Hey Arnold!, Klasky Csupo, Futurama, Dilbert, God, the Devil and Bob, Mission Hill, Baby Blues, Clerks: The Animated Series, The Oblongs, Family Guy, Game Over, Good Vibes, Disney Television Animation, Apple & Onion, Close Enough), character designer (Futurama), writer (Phineas and Ferb, Star vs. the Forces of Evil) and director (Skylanders Academy, Twelve Forever).
- October 7: Thom Yorke, English musician and member of Radiohead (voiced himself in the South Park episode "Scott Tenorman Must Die").
- October 8: Peter Gal, American television executive (Nickelodeon Animation Studio, DreamWorks Animation Television).
- October 9: Pete Docter, American director, writer and animator (Pixar).
- October 11:
  - Tiffany Grant, American actress (voice of Asuka Langley Soryu in Neon Genesis Evangelion, Nojiko in One Piece, Satella Harvenheit in Chrono Crusade, Marta in Fullmetal Alchemist).
  - Jane Krakowski, American actress (voice of Giselle in the Open Season franchise, Queen Haven in My Little Pony: A New Generation, Zhenya in The Simpsons episode "The Fabulous Faker Boy", Sizzle in the Sofia the First episode "The Royal Dragon", Willow in the Rapunzel's Tangled Adventure episode "The Way of the Willow").
- October 12:
  - Hugh Jackman, Australian actor (voice of Abraham Van Helsing in Van Helsing: The London Assignment, Roddy St. James in Flushed Away, Memphis in Happy Feet, E. Aster Bunnymund in Rise of the Guardians, Sir Lionel Frost in Missing Link, Dante in Human Resources, Janitor in The Simpsons episode "Poorhouse Rock", himself in the Big Mouth episode "No Nut November").
  - Adam Rich, American actor (voice of Presto in Dungeons & Dragons), (d. 2023).
- October 16: Todd Stashwick, American actor and writer (voice of the Cowardly Lion in Tom and Jerry and the Wizard of Oz and Tom and Jerry: Back to Oz, additional voices in Courage the Cowardly Dog and Phineas and Ferb).
- October 17: Ziggy Marley, Jamaican musician (voice of Ernie in Shark Tale, Lenny in Spider-Man: Across the Spider-Verse, Cheshire Cat in the Wonder Pets! episode "Adventures in Wonderland", performed the theme song of Arthur).
- October 22: Darla K. Anderson, American film producer (Pixar).
- October 24: Mark Walton, American storyboard artist (Walt Disney Animation Studios, DreamWorks Animation, Blue Sky Studios, Warner Animation Group), and voice actor (voice of Rhino in Bolt).
- October 26: Scott Froschauer, American key grip (The Wacky Adventures of Ronald McDonald), (d. 2026).
- October 29: Tom King, American animator (Space Jam, The Land Before Time V: The Mysterious Island, Quest for Camelot, Futurama), storyboard artist (Nickelodeon Animation Studio, Cartoon Network Studios, Dan Vs., Miles from Tomorrowland), writer and director (Fanboy & Chum Chum, Central Park, The Great North).
- October 30: Jack Plotnick, American actor, writer and producer (voice of Xandir P. Whifflebottom in Drawn Together).

=== November ===
- November 5: Sam Rockwell, American actor (voice of Hickory in Trolls World Tour, Mr. Wolf in The Bad Guys, Vic Reynolds in F Is for Family, Filson in the Napoleon Dynamite episode "FFA").
- November 8: Parker Posey, American actress and musician (voice of Dreamcatcher in Skylanders Academy, Lenny Busker, Angela and Sphinx in Robot Chicken).
- November 10:
  - Tom Papa, American comedian, actor and radio host (voice of Splitz and Klauss Vanderhayden in Bee Movie, El Superbeasto in The Haunted World of El Superbeasto).
  - Tracy Morgan, American actor and comedian (voice of Luiz in Rio and Rio 2, Mr. Gristle in The Boxtrolls, Felix in The Star, Captain Caveman in Scoob!, Early Cuyler in season 13 of Squidbillies).
- November 11: Lavell Crawford, American comedian and actor (voice of LaDante in Legends of Chamberlain Heights, Judge Jammer in the Squidbillies episode "Stop. Jammertime!").
- November 18: Owen Wilson, American actor (voice of Lightning McQueen in the Cars franchise, Coach Skip in Fantastic Mr. Fox, Reggie in Free Birds, Ricky in The Hero of Color City).
- November 19: Derek Drymon, American animator, storyboard artist, writer and director (SpongeBob SquarePants).
- November 21: Sean Schemmel, American actor (voice of Goku in the Funimation dub of Dragon Ball, Zander and Spectre in Dinosaur King, Nichrom in Shaman King).

=== December ===
- December 2: Lucy Liu, American actress, producer, director and artist (voice of Melana in The Real Adventures of Jonny Quest, Maggie Lee in Maya & Miguel, Mei in Mulan II, Raquel Smashenburn in Game Over, Viper in Kung Fu Panda, Silvermist in Tinker Bell, Sio in Afro Samurai: Resurrection, Lady Sagami in The Tale of the Princess Kaguya, Conformity in Michael Jackson's Halloween, Yumi in Animals, Callisto Mal in Strange World, Madam Wu in The Simpsons episode "Goo Goo Gai Pan", Bandit Leader in the Star Wars: Visions episode "The Duel", herself in the Futurama episodes "I Dated a Robot" and "Love and Rocket", and the Scooby-Doo and Guess Who? episode "The Tao of Scoob!").
- December 3: Brendan Fraser, American-Canadian actor (portrayed DJ Drake in Looney Tunes: Back in Action, voice of Sinbad in Sinbad: Beyond the Veil of Mists, Tasmanian Devil and She-Devil in Looney Tunes: Back in Action, David Kalaiki-Alii, Irv Bennett and Jimmy Beardon in King of the Hill, Howard Kind/Big Bug Man in Big Bug Man, Scorch Supernova in Escape from Planet Earth, Grayson in The Nut Job, Turbo Thunder in The Fairly OddParents episode "Wishology", Sammons Cagle in the Duckman episode "Dammit, Hollywood", Brad in The Simpsons episode "King of the Hill").
- December 5: Margaret Cho, American actress and comedian (voice of Condie Ling in Rick & Steve: The Happiest Gay Couple in All the World, Morgan in Infinity Train, Mai Lin in the Duckman episode "In the Nam of the Father", Sujin in the Family Guy episode "Candy, Quahog Marshmallow").
- December 7: Greg Ayres, American voice actor (voice of Negi Springfield in Negima, Chrono in Chrono Crusade, Son Goku in Saiyuki, Shinji Kazuma in Full Metal Panic!, Kaoru Hitachin in Ouran High School Host Club, Frost in Dragon Ball Super, Kōji Kōda in My Hero Academia, Kaworu Nagisa in the Neon Genesis Evangelion episode "The Beginning and the End, or 'Knockin' on Heaven's Door").
- December 8: Michael Cole, American pro wrestling commentator (voiced himself in Scooby-Doo! WrestleMania Mystery, Scooby-Doo! and WWE: Curse of the Speed Demon, Surf's Up 2: WaveMania, The Jetsons & WWE: Robo-WrestleMania!).
- December 16: Peter Dante, American actor and comedian (voice of Foot Locker Referee in Eight Crazy Nights).
- December 20: Paul C. Fabela, American television producer (Nickelodeon Animation Studio, Rugrats), production manager (Nickelodeon Animation Studio, Johnny Test) and production assistant (Disney Television Animation, Rugrats, Rocko's Modern Life).
- December 21:
  - Adam Beechen, American comic book and television writer (Warner Bros. Animation, Nickelodeon Animation Studio, Little Bill, X-Men: Evolution, Johnny Test, Littlest Pet Shop).
  - Khrystyne Haje, American actress (voice of Rebecca Falbrook in the Batman: The Animated Series episode "The Terrible Trio", Tiffany Morgan in The Zeta Project episode "Hicksburg").
- December 25: Chris Headrick, American animator, storyboard artist (Disney Television Animation, Nickelodeon Animation Studio, Looney Tunes: Back in Action, Warner Bros. Animation, The Grim Adventures of Billy & Mandy, My Gym Partner's a Monkey, The Haunted World of El Superbeasto, Dan Vs., NFL Rush Zone, Team Hot Wheels: The Origin of Awesome!, Legend of the Three Caballeros, Woody Woodpecker, Action Pack), writer (Looney Tunes, The Grim Adventures of Billy & Mandy, Phineas and Ferb) and director (Channel Umptee-3, The Looney Tunes Show).
- December 26:
  - Byron Howard, American animator, character designer, director, producer, and screenwriter (Walt Disney Animation Studios).
  - Bill Lawrence, American screenwriter, producer and director (co-creator of Clone High).
- December 28: David Barrera, American actor (voice of Esteban in the Generator Rex episode "Night Falls", Thanagarian #2 in the Justice League Unlimited episode "Hunter's Moon").
- December 30: Carey Yost, American animator (The Ren & Stimpy Show, Rover Dangerfield, The Schnookums & Meat Funny Cartoon Show, Timon & Pumbaa, The Twisted Tales of Felix the Cat, Jumanji, Hanna-Barbera, Toonsylvania), storyboard artist (Hercules and Xena - The Animated Movie: The Battle for Mount Olympus, Nickelodeon Animation Studio, The Haunted World of El Superbeasto), character designer (Cartoon Network Studios, Clone High, Maya & Miguel, The Buzz on Maggie, Cloudy with a Chance of Meatballs, The Mighty B!, SpongeBob SquarePants, Looney Tunes Cartoons) and writer (Cartoon Network Studios, The Haunted World of El Superbeasto).

=== Specific date unknown ===
- Kunihiro Abe, Japanese animator (Gundam), (d. 2018).
- Michael Carrington, American television writer (The Simpsons, The Proud Family, Motown Magic, Barbie: It Takes Two) and actor (voice of various characters in The Simpsons, Chauffeur and Malcolm H in The Critic episode "A Pig-Boy and His Dog").

== Deaths ==
=== January ===
- January 24: Steve Muffati, American animator and comics artist (Fleischer Studios, Famous Studios), dies at age 57.

=== February ===
- February 19: Hamilton Luske, American animator and director (Walt Disney Company), dies at age 64.

=== March ===
- March 31: Bobby Driscoll, American actor (voice of the title character in Peter Pan), dies at age 31.

=== April ===
- April 10: Olga Khodataeva, Russian animation director, animator, art director, and screenwriter (China in Flames, One of Many, The Samoyed Boy, The Little Organ, Sarmiko, The Flame of the Arctic), dies at age 74.
- April 20: Sid Sutherland, American animator, screenwriter and sound editor (Walter Lantz, Warner Bros. Cartoons), dies at age 66.
- April 22: Ernie Nordli, American animator, animation designer and lay-out artist (Walt Disney Company, Warner Bros. Cartoons, Hanna-Barbera), dies at age 55.

=== May ===
- May 21: Doris Lloyd, English-American actress (voice of Rose in Alice in Wonderland), dies at age 76.

=== October ===
- October 13: Bea Benaderet, American actress and comedienne (voice of Betty Rubble in The Flintstones, Little Red Riding Hood in Little Red Riding Rabbit, Granny in Tweety and Sylvester, Witch Hazel in Bewitched Bunny, Mama Bear in The Three Bears), dies at age 62 from lung cancer.
- October 30: John McLeish, Canadian actor (narrator in Dumbo, The Ducktators, The Dover Boys, and many Goofy cartoons, voice of the Carnival Barker in Pinocchio and John Ployardt in The Wind in the Willows segment of The Adventures of Ichabod and Mr. Toad) and animation writer (The Rite of Spring segment in Fantasia), dies at age 52.
- October 31: Léopold Survage, Russian-French avant-garde painter, pioneer of abstract animation (Rythmes colorés), dies at age 89.

=== November ===
- November 8: Gerald Mohr, American actor (voice of Mister Fantastic in Fantastic Four, Green Lantern in The Superman/Aquaman Hour of Adventure), dies at age 54.
- November 13: Berthold Bartosch, German-Bohemian filmmaker, pioneer of silhouette animation, creator of an early version of the multiplane camera, (animator for The Adventures of Prince Achmed, director of The Idea), dies at age 74.

=== December ===
- December 13: Ken Hultgren, American animator and comics artist (Walt Disney Company, Mr. Magoo, The Archies), dies from a heart attack at age 63.
- December 30: Bill Tytla, Ukrainian-American animator (Walt Disney Animation Studios, Terrytoons, Famous Studios), dies at age 64.

== See also ==
- 1968 in anime
