= Martina Apostolova =

Bulgarian actress (born 1990)

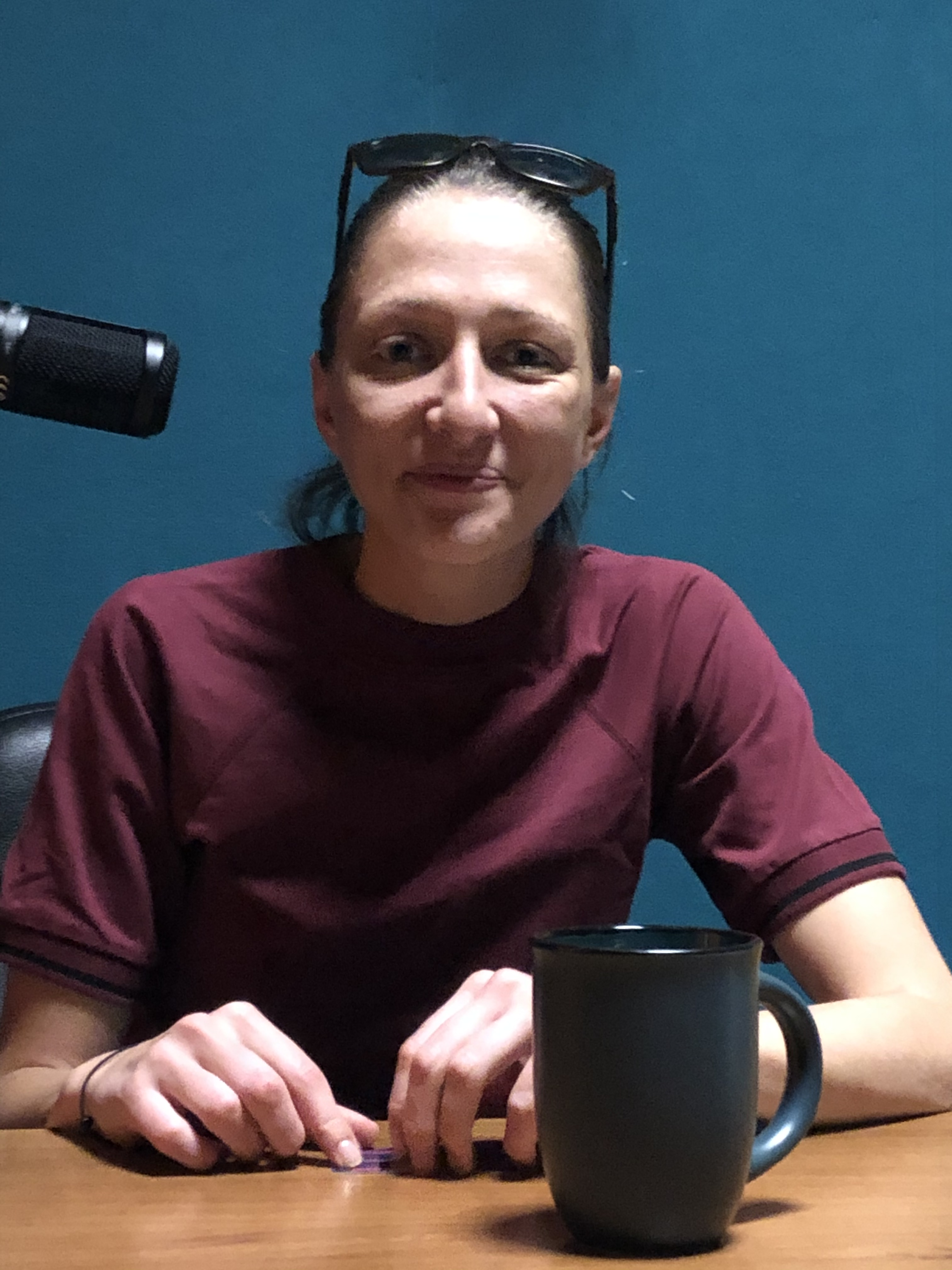
- Apostolova in 2019
- Born: 6 January 1990 (age 36); Blagoevgrad, Bulgaria
- Occupations: Actress; footballer
- Years active: 2013–present

Martina Apostolova (Bulgarian: Мартина Апостолова; born 6 January 1990) is a Bulgarian actress and former footballer who also starred in the titular role of her debut feature-length film, Irina (2018).

== Early life ==
Martina Apostolova was born on 6 January 1990 in Blagoevgrad, Bulgaria. She briefly lived in Germany. She was a professional footballer who played for LP Super Sport Sofia and later for the Bulgaria women's national football team.

She graduated from New Bulgarian University in 2013, majoring in acting. She began working as a staff member at the Nikola Vaptsarov Theater in Blagoevgrad.

== Career ==
She began participating in plays in her first year of college. She first appeared on stage in the play A Midsummer Night's Dream, directed by her lecturer Snezhina Petrova.

In 2018, she made her debut acting in the titular role in Irina. She won various awards for her performance, including a Golden Rose Award.

In 2020, Apostolova was honored the Shooting Stars Award by European Film Promotion. In 2022, she starred in the leading role in Theodore Ushev's dystopian science fiction film Phi 1.618.

== Filmography ==
=== Film ===
Year	Title	Role	Notes
2018	Irina	Irina	
2019	Whole	Yana	Short film
2020	10 Seconds	Alexandra	Short film
2022	Phi 1.618	Gargara	

=== Television ===
Year	Title	Role	Notes
2017	Stolen Life	Nina	
