= 1968 in anime =

The events of 1968 in anime.

== Releases ==
English name	Japanese name	Type	Demographic	Regions
Spooky Kitaro	ゲゲゲの鬼太郎 (GeGeGe no Kitarō)	TV	Shōnen	JA
Detective Brat Pack	わんぱく探偵団 (Wanpaku Tanteidan)	TV	Shōnen	JA
The World of Hans Christian Andersen	アンデルセン物語 (Andersen Monogatari)	Movie	Family, Children	JA
Star of the Giants	巨人の星 (Kyojin no Hoshi)	TV	Shōnen	JA
Animal One	アニマル1 (Animal 1)	TV	Shōnen	JA
Cyborg 009	サイボーグ・ゼロ・ゼロ・ナイン (Saibōgu Zero-Zero-Nain)	TV	Shōnen, Shōjo	JA
Fight, Pyuta!	ファイトだ!! ピュー太 (Fight Da!! Pyuta)	TV	Shōnen	JA
Little Miss Akane	あかねちゃん (Akane-chan)	TV	Shōjo	JA
The Monster Kid	怪物くん (Kaibutsu-kun)	TV	Shōnen	JA
The Great Adventure of Horus, Prince of the Sun	太陽の王子 ホルスの大冒険 (Taiyō no Ōji Horusu no Daibōken)	Movie	Family, Children	JA
Spooky Kitaro	ゲゲゲの鬼太郎 (GeGeGe no Kitarō)	Movie	Shōnen	JA
Sasuke	サスケ (Sasuke)	TV	Shōnen	JA, EU
The Ringleader of the Sunset	夕やけ番長 (Yuyake Banchō)	JA	Shōnen	NA
Dokachin the Primitive Boy	ドカチン (Dokachin)	TV	Children	JA
Sabu & Ichi's Arrest Warrant	佐武と市捕物控 (Sabu to Ichi Torimono Hikae)	TV	Shōnen, Seinen	JA
Humanoid Monster Bem	妖怪人間ベム (Yōkai Ningen Bemu)	TV	Shōnen	JA
Tobimaru and the Nine-tailed Fox	九尾の狐と飛丸 (Kyubi no kitsune to Tobimaru)	Movie	Family, Children	JA
Genesis	創世記 (Souseiki)	Short	General	JA
Dororo: Pilot Film	どろろ パイロットフィルム (Dororo: Pairotto Firumu)	Special	Shōnen	JA
Love of Kemeko	ケメ子のLOVE (Kemeko no LOVE)	Short	General	JA
Two Pikes	二匹のサンマ (Ni-hiki no Sanma)	Short	General	JA
Breaking of Branches is Forbidden	花折り (Hana-Ori)	Short	General	JA
When Grandpa Was a Pirate	おじいちゃんが海賊だった頃 (Ojii-chan ga Kaizoku Datta Koro)	Short	Children	JA

== See also ==
- 1968 in animation

== Births ==
- February 2 - Michael Arias, film director, producer, visual effects artist
