= Kottarashky =

- Origin: Bulgaria
- Genres: Balkan music, electronic music
- Years active: 2009–present
- Labels: Asphalt Tango Records
- Website: Asphalt Tango records

Kottarashky (Bulgarian: Котарашки) (born Nikola Gruev (Bulgarian: Никола Груев), 4 September 1979) is a musician and composer who fuses original recordings taken in his native Bulgaria, with electronic music, hip hop, jazz and other music genres. He personally defines his style as “Balkan psychedelic”, but critics consider him as part of the "Balkan beat wave". In November 2009 the German label Asphalt Tango Records released Kottarashky’s debut album “Opa Hey”. A few months later he founded the band Kottarashky & The Rain Dogs. In 2012 they released together his second album “Demoni” under the same label.

== Biography ==
Nikola Gruev was born on 4 September 1979 in Sofia, Bulgaria, in an artistic family. He studied architecture in his home city. After his graduation in 2003, Nikola started working in an architectural bureau. His experiments with digital music date back to his student years. Back then he was experimenting in his bedroom at home that was turned into a mini studio (Kottarashky is composing there till today). His specific style started getting shape a few years later, when he decided to integrate into his pieces samples from terrain recordings that he did during his trips throughout Bulgaria. That was how the piece “Opa Hey” was born. Nikola quit his job and concentrated almost all his energy on creating music, making his living as a freelance architect. After putting some of his tracks online in social networks, his compositions were noticed by Henry Ernst, founder of the Berlin-based label Asphalt Tango Records. In a few months Nikola Gruev signed a contract with the company. On 13 November 2009 it released his debut album “Opa Hey” and Nikola acquired the artistic name Kottarashky.

== “Opa Hey” ==
The album “Opa Hey” quickly won the attention of the critics receiving many positive reviews, including in newspapers such as The Guardian and The Independent. It was also acclaimed by world music BBC journalist Charlie Gillett. In December 2009 the album entered the prestigious World Music Charts Europe where it stayed for record-breaking 5 months and reached 3rd position in February 2010. Tracks from the album have been selected for various compilations, released in the UK, Germany and the USA.

== Kottarashky & The Rain Dogs ==
In March 2010 Nikola Gruev (sampling, programming) together with his colleague from the University Hristo Hadzhiganchev (guitar & keyboard), Alexandar Dobrev (clarinet) and Yordan Geshakov (bass) founded Kottarashky Live Band. After some time Atanas Popov (drums) joined them. The band adapted the pieces from “Opa Hey” for live performance with new arrangement and a very specific style. Its first live concert was at the festival Music Meeting in Nijmegen, The Netherlands. A month later the band played also in front of its home Bulgarian audience. There followed a number of concerts and tours in Bulgaria and abroad. Parallel to that the band worked on the arrangement of some of Kottarashky’s compositions that had been not released so far and at the end it produced the joint album “Demoni” with which the musicians appeared as Kottarashky & The Rain Dogs. The album was released on 4 May 2012 again by Asphalt Tango Records. The response by the critics was again positive. “Demoni” reached again 3rd position in the World Music Charts Europe.

Soon after the premiere of the album, Kottarashky & The Rain Dogs obtained their first professional music video to the single "Demoni", created by the world-renowned animator Theodore Ushev. The video won dozens of awards for short animation movie all over the world. The rest of Kottarashky’s music videos have been done by himself. There he applies the same collage approach as in his compositions. The album release was followed by guest-tours in clubs and festivals in Europe and Asia, among which WOMEX and Roskilde Festival in Denmark.

== Guest appearances ==
Two of the songs in “Demoni” are recorded in collaboration with singer Tui Mamaki from the New Zealand band The Mamaku Project. Kottarashky & The Rain Dogs did one single rehearsal with her and a joint concert in Sofia. The recordings for the album were done from distance: the instrumentals were recorded in Sofia and the vocals – in Auckland, New Zealand.

== Reception ==
In a positive review of the album Opa Hey!, music critic Tim Cumming of The Independent wrote, "What you hear feels like a dislocated dream ride through the pungent soundscape of night-time Sofia." Robin Denselow of The Guardian rated the album as 3/5 and wrote, "[E]ach of the 12 pieces here is constructed around a catchy, repeated riff, created not just from electronica, bass or keyboards, but from brass phrases, voices or strings."

== Discography ==
=== Albums ===
- Opa Hey! (2009, Asphalt Tango Records)
- Demoni (2012, Asphalt Tango Records, artist name "Kottarashky & The Rain Dogs")
- Cats, Dogs and Ghosts (2016, Asphalt Tango Records, artist name "Kottarashky & The Rain Dogs")
- Doghouse (2022, Asphalt Tango Records, artist name "Kottarashky & The Rain Dogs")

== Film scores ==
He is a frequent collaborator with Bulgarian-Canadian animator Theodore Ushev, including on Ushev's 2016 short, Blind Vaysha
