= Blind Vaysha =

- Film poster
- Directed by: Theodore Ushev
- Written by: Theodore Ushev
- Based on: Blind Vaysha by Georgi Gospodinov
- Produced by: Marc Bertrand
- Narrated by: Caroline Dhavernas
- Music by: Kottarashky
- Production company: National Film Board of Canada
- Release date: February 15, 2016 (Berlinale)
- Running time: 8 minutes
- Country: Canada
- Language: English/French

Blind Vaysha (French: Vaysha l'aveugle) is a 2016 animated short by Theodore Ushev, produced by Marc Bertrand for the National Film Board of Canada, with the participation of ARTE France. Based on a story by Georgi Gospodinov, the film tells the story of a girl who sees the past out of her left eye and the future from her right—and so is unable to live in the present. Montreal actress Caroline Dhavernas performed the narration for the film, in both its French and English language versions. The film incorporates music from Bulgarian musician and composer Kottarashky and is his and Ushev's fourth collaboration.

== Summary ==
A girl named Vaysha is born with a brown left eye that only sees the past and a green right eye that only sees the future. Despite being able to see clearly like everyone else, the girl's condition prevents her from seeing the present, prompting her neighbours to call her "Blind Vaysha". Because of her split-vision, Vaysha rarely leaves her house and frequently injures herself because she simultaneously sees things and people as they were then and what they will be (e.g. she sees trees as saplings and stumps, and her own parents as children and old people).

When Vaysha explains her condition, a group of old medicine women, believing she is cursed, attempt to cure her by giving her ineffective herbal remedies and placing animal body parts on her eyes. When nothing works, the old women go home in defeat.

Vaysha then grows up, her two-coloured eyes amplifying her beauty. But when she meets her suitors however, she sees them as boys and as old men.

Even at night, when Vaysha is asleep, her double-vision affects her dreams: she sees herself as a little girl and a dead old woman, and once sees the beginning and the end of the world.

Tired of her disability, Vaysha finds herself in a lose-lose situation: if she removes her left eye, she will only see horrifying visions of the future; if she removes her right eye, she will be comforted but always see her parents as children.

Like the short story it is based on, the film has no proper ending and the narrator warns the audience to live in the present rather than seek comfort in what was lost and could never be retrieved, and to avoid fearing what might happen next.

== Development ==
Ushev has stated that the project began at Fontevraud Abbey in France, where he worked for a month on the story and was inspired by medieval drawing. He did fifty paintings during his stay in Maine-et-Loire, drawing inspiration from the Abbey's architecture and with the design of the film's central character influenced by paintings of Eleanor of Aquitaine.

Ushev was already working with a text by Gospodinov for an upcoming film when he and a group of friends had the idea of making "an omnibus out of some of his short stories." While reading them, Ushev was captivated by the story of Blind Vaysha, which immediately struck him as being suited to his style of filmmaking.

== Production ==
The film was animated on a Cintiq tablet in a linocut-style, a medium Ushev had worked with since the age of 12. Ushev sought to reproduce the visual artifacts of the linocut technique by never using the "Undo" command on his computer while drawing: "Because with linocut, once your hand carves it, it is gone. You cannot put the black back. This creates a natural feeling of the unpredictable, of mistakes and the holy imperfection of the image—which is the basis of every creation." Ushev has estimated he did between 12,000 and 13,000 drawings for the film, which took him about six months to make. As with two of Ushev's earlier films, Drux Flux and Gloria Victoria, Blind Vaysha was produced as a 3D film.

== Reception ==
Blind Vaysha had its world premiere at the 2016 Berlinale. It received both the Jury Award and Junior Jury Award at the 2016 Annecy International Animated Film Festival. In September 2016, the film received the Cartoon Network Award for Best Narrative Short Animation and the Canadian Film Institute Award for Best Canadian Animation at the Ottawa International Animation Festival. The film was also included in the list of Canada's Top Ten shorts of 2016, selected by a panel of filmmakers and industry professionals organized by TIFF.

In March 2017, Blind Vaysha won the Canadian Screen Award for Best Animated Short at the 5th Canadian Screen Awards, and in June it won the Prix Iris for Best Animated Short Film at the 19th Quebec Cinema Awards.

It was also nominated for Best Animated Short at the 89th Academy Awards (lost to Pixar's Piper). Ushev stated that with 16 films to his credit to date, he had given up hope of ever being nominated for an Oscar because he worried that his films might be "too abstract, too avant garde, too elitist, too dark" for the Academy. He stated that upon hearing the news of his Oscar nomination, he had a strong emotional reaction: "When I heard the name of my film, I just stopped watching, because I fainted... I cried. At first I laughed and then I cried again. It's out of control.... It's all strange and exciting." On February 26, upon the eve of the Oscars, public television in Ushev's native Bulgaria aired a dubbed version of the film, narrated by Teodora Duhovnikova.

== Virtual reality ==
The eight-minute animated short was adapted next into a virtual reality work by the NFB.
