= Shorts in Motion: The Art of Seduction =

- Genre: Family
- Written by: Ryan Leigh
- Country of origin: Canada
- No. of seasons: 1
- No. of episodes: 10

Production
- Executive producers: Mark Bishop; Matt Hornburg; Silva Basmajian; Judy Gladstone
- Producers: Doug MacFarlane; Nadine Simunic; Michael Fukushima; Maryse Chapdelaine; Colette Loumède; Lori Lozinski; Jody Shapiro
- Running time: 3 minutes
- Production company: Marblemedia

Original release
- Release: 2007

Shorts in Motion: The Art of Seduction is a Canadian anthology of 10 original two-minute mobile shorts for video cell phones, by directors, artists and personalities including Ann Marie Fleming, Mark McKinney, Guy Maddin, Isabella Rossellini, Theodore Ushev and Denis Villeneuve. The series was presented by Bravo!FACT and co-produced by marblemedia and the National Film Board of Canada (NFB). It was one of the NFB's first ventures into mobile media. Rossellini was the only non-Canadian director.

== Films ==
- Nude Caboose: Guy Maddin - A jovial shirtless man attempts to rouse a contingent of lethargic dancers to life in Nude Caboose. His highjinks really get the deadbeats bustin' out until something unusual catches his eye. Dance floor seduction distilled into a fateful moment!
- Strip Show: Adam & Dave - Adam Brodie and Dave Derewlany's short film about an internet seductress who gets duped into performing out of character, acts before the camera.
- Not Pretty, Really: Mark McKinney - Writer director Mark McKinney conducts candid interviews with selected subjects on the benefits and downside of being considered "pretty."
- On Fire: Jenn Goodwin - Writer director Jenn Goodwin's live action short about a firefighter who acts out his inner desire of being a dancer while on his way to work.
- Dirty Dog: Trent Carlson - Trent Carlson's short about a man who tries to atone for his infidelity by serenading the woman he scorned.
- 120 Seconds to Get Elected: Denis Villeneuve - A young politician has 100 seconds to convince his audience to vote for him. His speech becomes an improvisation in which he tries to capture the needs of the crowd. According to the reactions of the crowd, he changes his ideas and opinions and goes back on his promises. He focuses on seducing the audience by finding out what they want to hear. A satirical parody that shows a man abandoning his world view in hope of seducing the masses. The ideas are not an end but a means.
- Sou: Theodore Ushev - Set to a kinetic soundtrack, Sou is a dazzling multi-layered animated collage piece on how a Western man, through ill-equipped eyes, views the seductive qualities of the pell mell kitsch that is the modern Japanese society.
- Electric Chairs: Anita McGee - Grandpa may be 95 years old, but he's still young at heart. Even at his own birthday party, he is lured away by an ageing babe on an electric scooter. Proof indeed that you're never too old to play the game.
- My Obscure Object of Desire: Ann Marie Fleming - In the animated short My Obscure Object of Desire, the heart will go to any lengths to become the object of its love's desire. So it woos, coos and even "awoos." But in the end not even the heart can always get what it wants.
- Oh La La: Isabella Rossellini - A city's population whisked off the streets and in to the bedrooms. So this is where the art of seduction leads us! A harmonious symphony of pleasure fills our ears. Oh la la! C'est magnifique!

== Features ==
Shorts in Motion: The Art of Seduction integrates quizzes, advice columns and guides as well as downloads of all 10 Micro Movies which can be played back on mobile phones. For a further level of audience interaction, the ability to create and send e-cards via users' cell phones was also implemented.

== Awards ==
The Art of Seduction was named Best Made for Mobile Video Service at the GSM Global Mobile Awards (Barcelona, 2007) and Best Original Content for Mobile at the Banff World Television Award (Banff, 2007). It was also nominated for an International Interactive Emmy.
