= Phi 1.618 =

- Film poster
- Directed by: Theodore Ushev
- Written by: Vladislav Todorov
- Based on: The Spinning Top by Vladislav Todorov
- Produced by: Orlin Ruevski; Vladislav Todorov; Theodore Ushev; Etienne Hansez
- Starring: Nikolay Stanoev; Deyan Donkov; Martina Apostolova
- Cinematography: Emil Christov
- Edited by: Victoria Radoslavova
- Production companies: Moviemento; Peripeteia
- Release dates: October 8, 2022 (Cinelibri Festival); October 13, 2022 (Canada)
- Running time: 91 minutes
- Countries: Bulgaria; Canada
- Language: Bulgarian

Phi 1.618 (Bulgarian: ф 1.618) is a 2022 Bulgarian-Canadian dystopian science fiction adventure film directed by Theodore Ushev (in his directorial debut) and written by Vladislav Todorov. Starring Nikolay Stanoev, Deyan Donkov & Martina Apostolova. It is based on the novel The Spinning Top by Vladislav Todorov. The film was named on the shortlist for Bulgarian's entry for the Academy Award for Best International Feature Film at the 95th Academy Awards, but it was not selected. It was considered again when Mother was disqualified, however, it was not selected.

== Synopsis ==
In a dystopian future, asexual, immortal men are created. The female sex to reproduce has therefore become redundant. As a poison spreads across the Earth, the loveless men set out to colonize the galaxy. On the spaceship they take the barely alive body of a woman with them, as a reminder of the past. While the calligrapher Krypton is busy creating a copy of the entire legacy of the Immortals, he comes across the irascible woman Gargara.

== Cast ==
The actors participating in this film are:

- Deyan Donkov as Krypton
- Martina Apostolova as Gargara
- Irmena Chichikova as Fia
- Nikolay Stanoev as Urungel

== Release ==
The film had its premiere in Bulgaria on October 8, 2022, at the Cinelibri International Book&Movie Festival and had its international premiere on October 13, 2022, at Festival du Nouveau Cinéma, in Canada.

The film stirred controversy by being winning an Award at the Moscow International Film Festival during the Russo-Ukrainian War. During his acceptance speech, the director, Theodore Ushev, made antiwar statements. The acceptance speech was not aired during the official broadcast of the ceremony in Russia, however Ushev shared the speech on Facebook. The director refused the "Silver Saint George" Special Jury award, suggesting leaving it in Moscow, hoping that it reminds Nikita Mikhalkov, the president of the Festival, that Saint George symbolises the victory of good over evil, not the other way around. Ushev also promised to come "when it will be possible to breathe freely in Moscow" and take his reward back.

== Awards ==
Year	Award	Category	Recipient	Result	Ref.
2022	Cinelibri International Book&Movie Festival	Best Costume Design	Velika Prahova	Won	
2022	Festival du nouveau cinéma	New Alchemist Award - Feature Film	Phi 1.618	Nominated	
2023	Beverly Hills Film Festival	Best Feature Film	Phi 1.618	Won	
2023	Moscow International Film Festival	Feature Film Competition	Phi 1.618	Won/refused	
2023	Miami International Sci-Fi Festival	Best Sci-Fi Feature Film	Phi 1.618	Won	
	Miami International Sci-Fi Festival	Best Director Feature Sci-Fi	Theodore Ushev	Won	
