= Tatlin's Tower =

1919 proposed tower in Petrograd, Russia

Monument to the Third International
- Памятник III Интернационалу
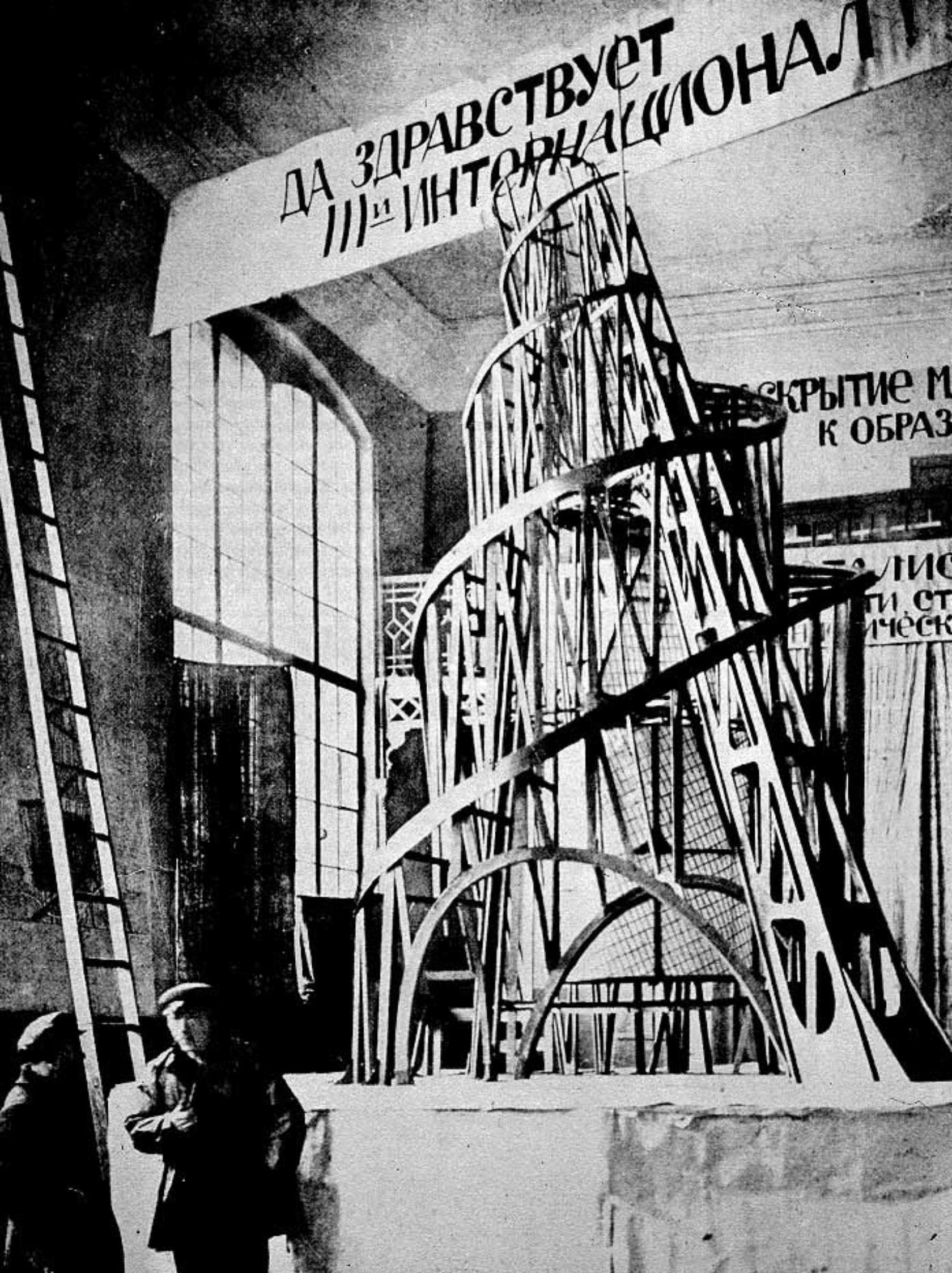
- Vladimir Tatlin and a model of his Monument to the Third International, Moscow, 1920.
- Alternative names: Tatlinʼs Tower

General information
- Status: Proposed
- Type: Monument, Communications, Conferences, Government, etc.
- Architectural style: Constructivism
- Location: St. Petersburg, Russia

Height
- Height: 400 m (1,300 ft)

Design and construction
- Architect: Vladimir Tatlin
- Architecture firm: Creative Collective

Tatlinʼs Tower, or the project for the Monument to the Third International (1919–20), was a design for a grand monumental building by the Russian artist and architect Vladimir Tatlin, that was never built. It was planned to be erected in Petrograd (now Saint Petersburg) after the October Revolution of 1917, as the headquarters and monument of the Communist International (the "Third International").

== Plans ==
Tatlinʼs Constructivist tower was to be built from industrial materials: iron, glass and steel. In materials, shape and function, it was envisaged as a towering symbol of modernity. It would have dwarfed the Eiffel Tower in Paris. The tower's main form was a twin helix which spiraled up to 400 m (1,300 feet) in height, around which visitors would be transported with the aid of various mechanical devices. The main framework would contain four large suspended geometric structures. These structures would rotate at different rates. At the base of the structure was a cube which was designed as a venue for lectures, conferences and legislative meetings, and this would complete a rotation in the span of one year. Above the cube would be a smaller pyramid housing executive activities and completing a rotation once a month. Further up would be a cylinder, which was to house an information centre, issuing news bulletins and manifestos via telegraph, radio and loudspeaker, and would complete a rotation once a day. At the top, there would be a hemisphere for radio equipment. There were also plans to install a gigantic open-air screen on the cylinder, and a further projector which would be able to cast messages across the clouds on any overcast day.

== Evaluations ==
There are serious doubts about the tower’s practicality given that the amount of steel required would have been impossible to obtain in bankrupt post-revolutionary Russia.

Tatlin's tower was critical to Soviet propaganda. Symbolically, the tower was said to represent the aspirations of its originating country and a challenge to the Eiffel Tower as the foremost symbol of modernity. Soviet critic Viktor Shklovsky is said to have called it a monument "made of steel, glass and revolution."

== Models ==
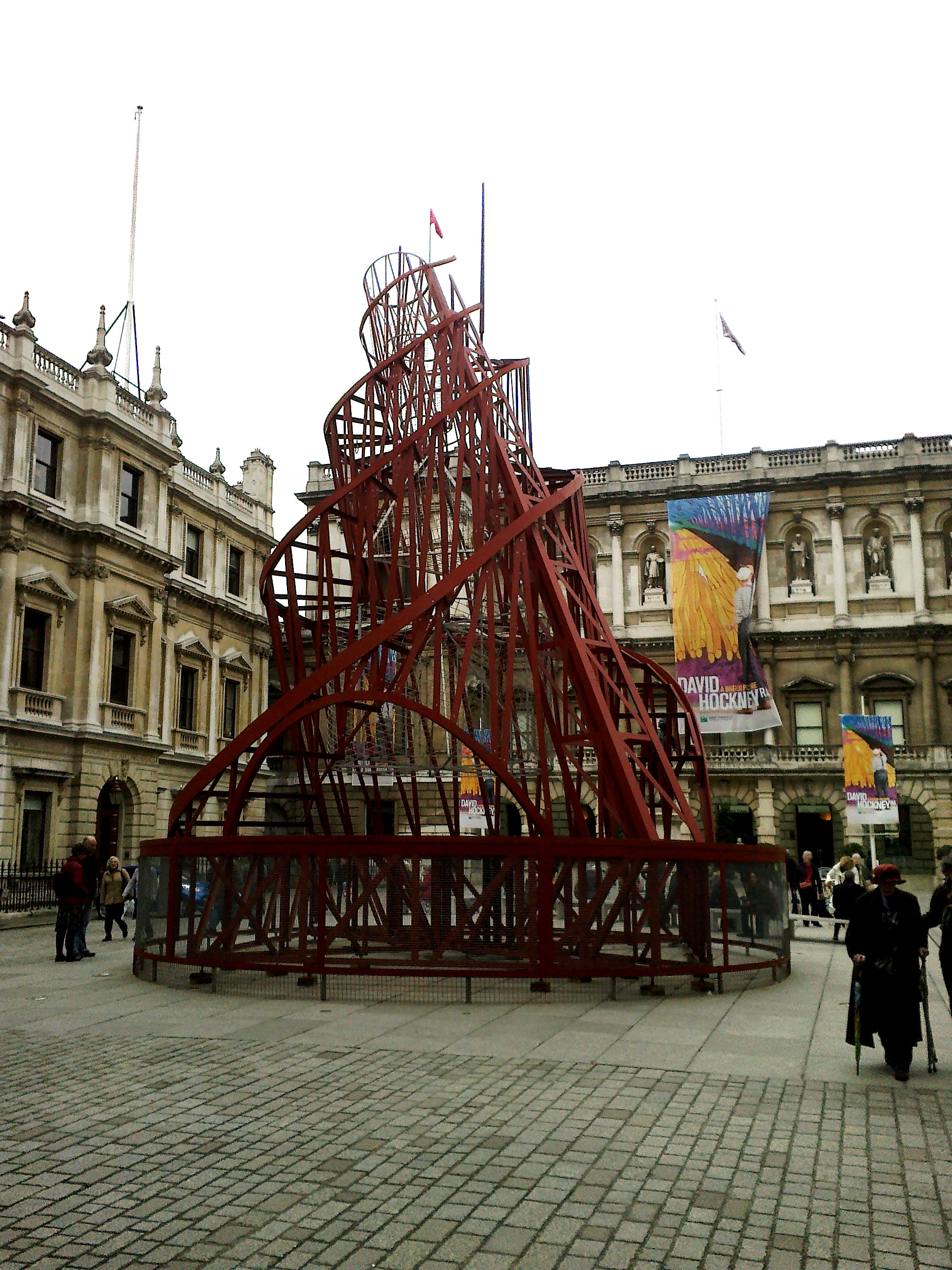
Model of Tatlin's Tower in the courtyard of the Royal Academy, London.

There are models of Tatlinʼs Tower at the Moderna Museet in Stockholm, Sweden, at Tretyakov Gallery in Moscow, and at Musée National d'Art Moderne at the Centre Georges Pompidou in Paris. A 1:42 model was built at The Royal Academy of Arts, London in November 2011. In September 2017, the same 1:42 model was erected as part of the ʻRussian Seasonʼ at the Sainsbury Centre for Visual Arts at the University of East Anglia in Norwich. After the exhibition closed in February 2018, the tower was moved to the sculpture park that surrounds the Sainsbury Centre.

Ai Weiweiʼs 2007 sculpture Fountain of Light, currently on display at the Louvre Abu Dhabi, is modelled on the Tatlin Tower.

== See also ==
- Shukhov Tower
- Tower Bawher, an abstract short film inspired by Tatlin's Tower.
- Disco Elysium, a video game which depicts communists building a similar tower from matchboxes.
- ArcelorMittal Orbit (2014)
- SKA Arena (2023), the design of which was inspired by Tatlin's Tower.

== References and sources ==
Sources

- Tatlinʼs Tower: Monument to Revolution, Norbert Lynton, Yale University Press, 2008
- Art and Literature under the Bolsheviks: Volume One – The Crisis of Renewal Brandon Taylor, Pluto Press, London 1991
- Tatlin, edited by L.A. Zhadova, Thames and Hudson, London 1988
- Concepts of Modern Art, edited by Nikos Stangos, Thames and Hudson, London 1981
- Vladimir Tatlin and the Russian avant-garde, John Milner, Yale University Press, New Haven 1983
- Nikolai Punin. The Monument to the Third International, 1920
