= Irina (film) =

2018 film by Nadejda Koseva

- Directed by: Nadejda Koseva
- Written by: Nadejda Koseva; Svetoslav Ovtcharov; Bojan Vuletic
- Produced by: Stefan Kitanov
- Starring: Martina Apostolova; Hristo Ushev; Irini Jambonas; Kasiel Noah Asher
- Cinematography: Kiril Prodanov
- Edited by: Nina Altaparmakova
- Music by: Petar Dundakov
- Release date: 18 October 2018 (Poland)
- Running time: 96 minutes
- Country: Bulgaria
- Language: Bulgarian

Irina (Bulgarian: Ирина) is a 2018 Bulgarian drama film directed by Nadejda Koseva.

== Plot ==
Irina is a part-time waitress in a small Bulgarian town. On the same day when she is fired, her husband gets into a serious accident. Irina's family is trapped in poverty. To make ends meet, she becomes a surrogate mother. Conflict, despair, and Irina being with child brings on another wave of challenges to Irina's already rough situation. Slowly, Irina discovers what it means to love and to forgive.

Irina contacted a wealthy couple living in Sofia and made a deal with them. Once she gave birth to the child, she promised to give it to them within three days.

A fertilized egg from a wealthy couple was transferred to Irina's uterus, and she successfully became pregnant. The couple interfered, telling her not to do manual labor, eat meat, and drink alcohol. Knowing that the fetus was male, they got excited about the color of the clothes and shoes, as well as the color of the rooms and furniture, to be blue. Irina got frustrated at being treated like a commodity and suggested an abortion. The couple tried to win over her by offering a luxury apartment in Sofia. Her husband Sasho, on the other hand, was dissatisfied with Irina because she was often away from home, and told her not to come back if she would go to Sofia again.

Her due date was approaching. The fetus energetically kicked the uterus. A wealthy wife was pleased when the fetus's face resembled her own in a 3D ultrasound. But Irina had changed her mind that she did not want to give up her child. Finding out about this, the wealthy wife became furious. At that moment, water broke and she watched anxiously as Irina went into labor. Irina eventually gave the baby, who was born healthy, to the couple, and she headed home. Tears flowed endlessly from her eyes. By the time she arrived home, where her husband and child were waiting for her, her tears had dried.

== Cast ==
- Martina Apostolova as Irina
- Hristo Ushev as Sasho
- Irini Jambonas as Eva
- Kasiel Noah Asher as Ludmila
- Alexander Kossev as Bozhidar
- Krassimir Dokov as Varlaam
- Ivan Savov as The Doctor
- Katerina Keremidchieva as Waitress
- Nikolay Todorov as Tavern Owner
- Ana Valchanova as Hospital Attendant

== Reception ==
- 2018: Fajr International Film Festival, Winner Silver Simorgh for Best Actress (Martina Apostolova)
- 2018: Warsaw International Film Festival, Winner of the Ecumenical Jury Award, Winner of the Special Jury Award for Martina Apostolova (actor), Nominee for Grand Prix, In-Competition section, Poland
- 2018: Tirana International Film Festival, Winner of the Golden Owl Award for the Best Feature Film, Albania
- 2018: Minsk International Film Festival, Nominee for Grand Prix for the Best Film, Belarus
- 2018: Golden Rose Bulgarian Feature Film Festival, Winner of the Award of the Union of Bulgarian Filmmakers for the Best Director. Winner of the Golden Rose Award for the Best First Feature, Winner of the Golden Rose Award for the Best Actress (Martina Apostolova), Nominee for Golden Rose Award for Best Feature film
- 2018: Cottbus Film Festival of Young East European Cinema, Winner of the Best Debut Film, Winner of the Award for Outstanding Actress (Martina Apostolova), Nominee for the Main Prize for Best Film
