= Shobunsha =

Shobunsha Holdings, Inc.
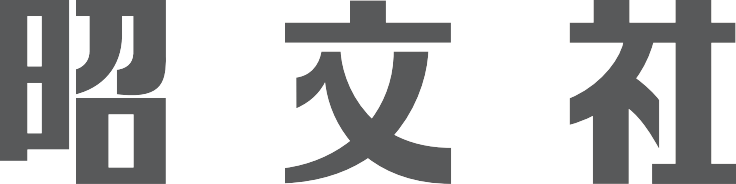

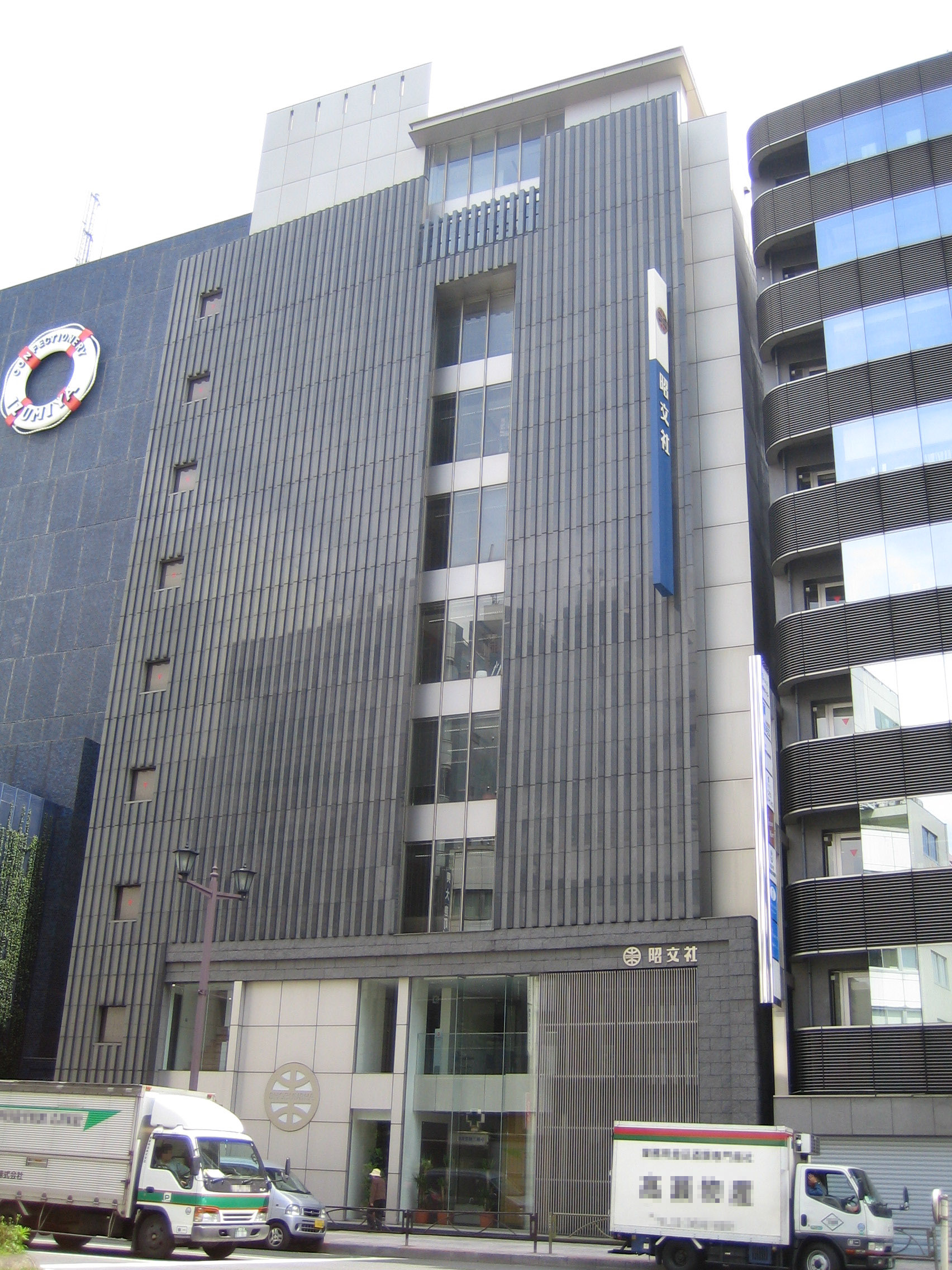
- Headquarters in Chiyoda, Tokyo
- Native name: 株式会社昭文社ホールディングス
- Romanized name: Kabushiki-gaisha Shōbunsha hōrudingusu
- Formerly: Shobunsha Publications, Inc. (1960-2020)
- Type: Public KK
- Traded as: TYO: 9745
- Industry: Publishing
- Founded: May 31, 1960; 66 years ago
- Headquarters: Kōjimachi, Chiyoda, Tokyo, Japan
- Products: Map, Guide books
- Subsidiaries: Shobunsha Publications; Mapple; Shobunsha Creative
- Website: www.mapple.co.jp

Shobunsha (昭文社, Shōbunsha) is a Japanese map publisher which headquartered in Kōjimachi, Chiyoda, Tokyo. Shobunsha is known for its road maps and travel guidebook series.

Shobunsha was founded in 1960 and moved its headquarters to Tokyo in 1977. It listed on Tokyo stock exchange in 1999. The flagship brand of Shobunsha map and guide book is Mapple.

== Overview ==
The company's first commercial products, the "Map of Osaka City Sections" and the "Detailed Map of Kawachi City," were highly regarded, and the company eventually gained a dominant market share in road maps (such as Super Mapple) and travel guidebooks (such as Mappuru). It also publishes other maps, including mountain and highland maps, as well as disaster evacuation support maps. The company is currently transitioning into an information services provider by advancing map production through SiMAP.

On April 1, 2020 (Reiwa 2), the company transitioned to a holding company structure, changing the trade name of Shobunsha Co., Ltd. (the first) to Shobunsha Holdings Co., Ltd. Its business operations were inherited by three companies: Shobunsha Co., Ltd. (the second, renamed on the same day from Shobunsha Preparation Company), Mapuru Co., Ltd., and MEGURU Co., Ltd.

== History ==
1960: After working as an outside sales representative for Jinbunsha, Toshio Kuroda founded the company in Higashi-ku, Osaka. His founding principle was to create "maps for the general public," rather than specialized maps. The company initially focused on producing city maps.

1963: A sales office was established in Tokyo, and the publication of Newest was launched. The company also began publishing prefectural maps, road maps by prefecture, and mountain maps, which remain in publication.

1964: The company was incorporated as Shobunsha Co., Ltd.

1968: The headquarters were relocated to Bunkyo-ku, Tokyo.

1970: Published the "Aerial Map EXPO '70" for the Osaka World Expo.

1972: Released its first book-style road atlas, the "Grand Prix Road Atlas."

1977: Relocated its headquarters to Chiyoda-ku, Tokyo.

1978: Entered the travel guidebook market.

1989: Entered the magazine business by launching the travel information magazine Mappuru.

1991: Launched the Super Mapple road map series.

1995: Released the electronic mapping software "Mapple Life" and began operation of its proprietary map database system, "SiMAP," initiating a revision of its map designs.

1996: Its shares were listed on the over-the-counter market.

1998: Eiji Aoyagi became President.

1999, March: Listed on the Tokyo Stock Exchange, Second Section.

2000, March: Upgraded to the Tokyo Stock Exchange, First Section.[2]

2003: Published its first weekly part-work, Nihon no Meiyu (Japan's Famous Hot Springs).

2005: Shigeo Kuroda became President.

2007: Entered the hotel reservation business.

2008: Launched the Kotorippu travel guidebook series, targeting young women.

2010: Began service for Mappuru Link, a free supplementary app exclusively for readers of the Mappuru travel magazine.

2014: Launched Kotorippu Magazine, a quarterly travel lifestyle magazine complementing the Kotorippu series.

2018: Due to the widespread adoption of smartphone map applications, the company projected a net loss for fiscal year 2018. It subsequently solicited voluntary early retirement for approximately 80 employees, representing about 20% of its workforce.

2020: Transitioned to a holding company structure. Shobunsha Co., Ltd. was renamed Shobunsha Holdings Co., Ltd., while Shobunsha Preparation Company was renamed Shobunsha Co., Ltd. (the second). Business operations were transferred via an absorption-type company split to Shobunsha Co., Ltd. (the second), Mapuru Co., Ltd., and MEGURU Co., Ltd.
