= Christine Lawrence Finney =

American animator and painter

- Born: April 1, 1968; Painesville, Ohio, U.S.
- Died: January 5, 2016 (aged 47); Spartanburg, South Carolina, U.S.
- Spouse: Trey Finney

Christine Lawrence Finney (April 1, 1968 – January 5, 2016) was an American animator and painter.

== Life ==
Born in Painesville, Ohio, Finney began working at Walt Disney Pictures in the 1980s.

She worked on numerous films, specializing in character animation, during the Disney Renaissance, including The Rescuers Down Under (1990), Beauty and the Beast (1991), Aladdin (1992), The Lion King (1994), Pocahontas (1995), Mulan (1998), Lilo & Stitch (2002), and Brother Bear (2003). Finney, with her husband, moved to Spartanburg, South Carolina, spending her time painting regionally.

Finney died on January 5, 2016, in Spartanburg, aged 47.

== Filmography ==
Year	Title	Credits	Characters
1990	Roller Coaster Rabbit (Short)	Inbetween Artist	
1990	The Rescuers Down Under	Breakdown and Inbetween Artist	
1991	Beauty and the Beast	Key Assistant	Belle
1992	Off His Rockers (Short)	Clean-Up Artist	
1992	Aladdin	Assistant Animator	Jasmine
1993	Trail Mix-Up (Short)	Assistant Animator	
1994	The Lion King	Assistant	Young Simba
1995	Pocahontas	Key Assistant	Pocahontas
1998	Mulan	Lead Key	Shan-Yu, Hayabusa the Falcon and Elite Huns Soldiers
2000	John Henery (Short)	Clean-Up Supervisor	
2002	Lilo & Stitch	Clean-Up Supervisor / Lead Key	Miscellaneous Characters
2003	Brother Bear	Clean-Up Supervisor	
2012	Men in Suits (Video Documentary)	Gorilla Thanks	
