= Demoni (2012 film) =

- Directed by: Theodore Ushev
- Produced by: Helmut Ernst
- Cinematography: Theodore Ushev
- Edited by: Theodore Ushev
- Music by: Kottarashky
- Production company: Asphalt Tango
- Release date: June 2012
- Running time: 3.5 minutes
- Countries: Canada; Bulgaria

Demoni is a Canadian-Bulgarian animated short film, directed by Theodore Ushev and released in 2012. A music video for the song of the same name by Bulgarian musician Kottarashky, the film depicts scenes of Eastern European folk art on a spinning vinyl record.

The film was a Canadian Screen Award nominee for Best Animated Short Film at the 1st Canadian Screen Awards.
