= Tower Bawher =

- Directed by: Theodore Ushev
- Music by: Georgy Sviridov ("Time, Forward!")
- Release date: 2005
- Running time: 3 minutes, 46 seconds
- Country: Canada

Tower Bawher is a 2005 constructivist-style abstract animated short by Theodore Ushev, set to the musical composition "Time, Forward!" by Russian composer Georgy Sviridov.

The film's title is an allusion to Tatlin's Tower, an unbuilt structure conceived by Vladimir Tatlin as a tribute to the glory of the proletariat. Drawing on the tower's design, the film seems to build toward a utopian goal, until the grandiose, futuristic forms abruptly tumble. In Tower Bawher, Ushev celebrates constructivist art while also critiquing the use of art in the service of ideology. The film contains visual references to such Soviet era artists as Dziga Vertov, the Stenberg brothers, Alexander Rodchenko, El Lissitzky and Lyubov Popova.

The 3 minute 46 second film was made over a five-week period in Montreal, beginning in April 2005, when Ushev ran into problems working on was to have been his first animated short with the National Film Board of Canada, the children's film Tzaritza. The filmmaker had a strong connection with the Sviridov musical piece, having heard it as a child in Bulgaria as the theme music for the Soviet state TV evening news.

Despite difficulties in securing the music rights to the Sviridov composition, which had been in dispute in Russian civil court at the time, Tower Bawher was completed in time for its world premiere at the Ottawa International Animation Festival in September 2005. Awards for the film included the prize for best non-narrative film at I Castelli Animati festival and the award for best abstract film at the London International Animation Festival.

The film is similar in style to Ushev's 2008 film, Drux Flux, both utilizing Soviet constructivist imagery and Russian classical music score.
