= Vladimir Tatlin =

Russian artist (1885–1953)

- Владимир Татлин (Russian); Володимир Татлін (Ukrainian)
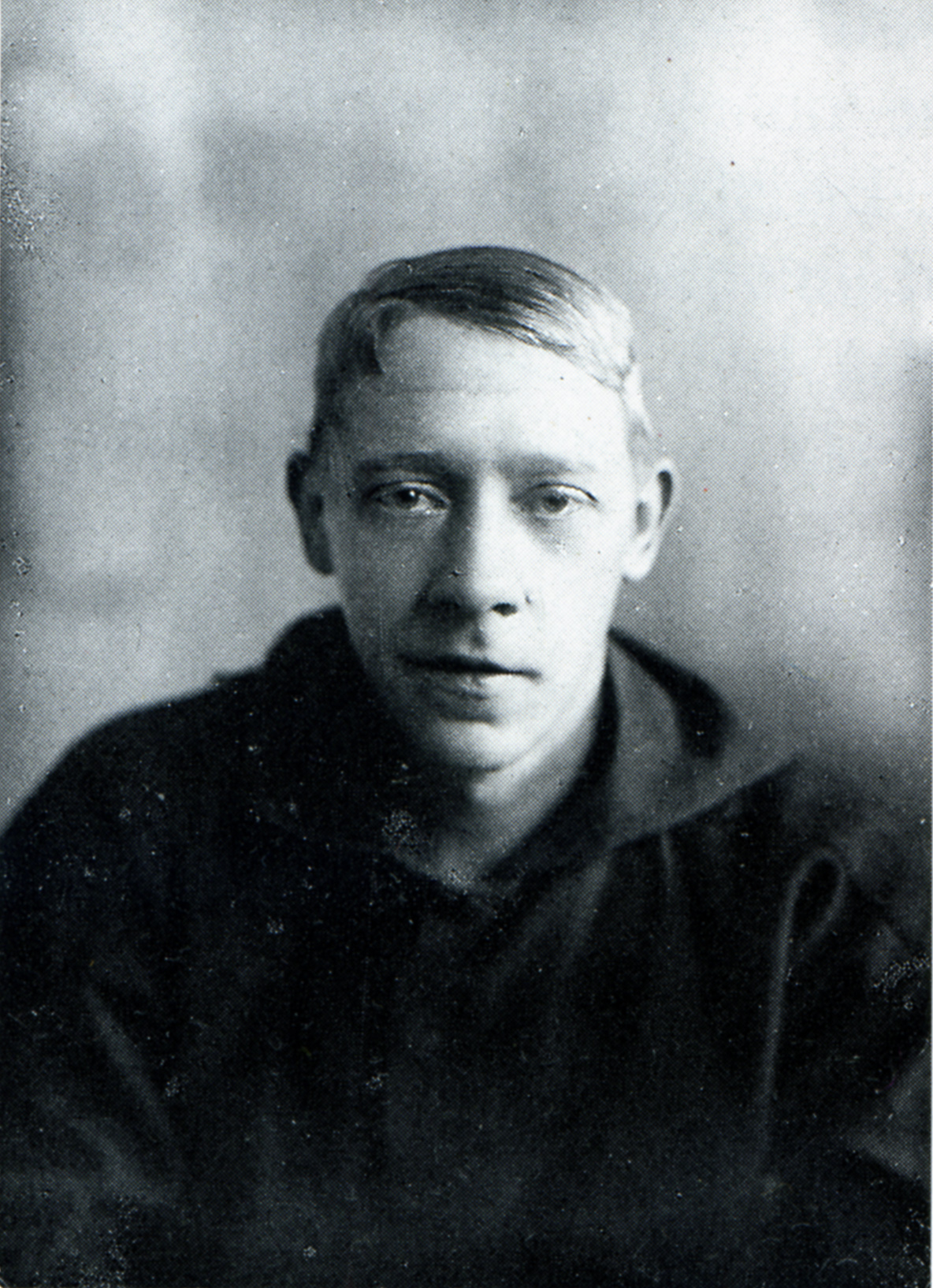
- Vladimir Tatlin in a sailor's blouse (1914–1915)
- Born: 28 December 1885; Kharkov or Moscow, Russia
- Died: 31 May 1953 (aged 67); Moscow, Soviet Union
- Education: Kharkov Real School; Moscow School of Painting, Sculpture and Architecture; Penza School of Art
- Notable work: Tatlin's Tower or the project for the Monument to the Third International
- Style: Soviet avant-garde, constructivism
- Children: Anatoli Romov
- Awards: People's Artist of the RSFSR

Vladimir Yevgrafovich Tatlin (Note: In this name that follows East Slavic naming customs, the patronymic is Yevgrafovich and the family name is Tatlin.) (Note: Russian: Владимир Евграфович Татлин; Ukrainian: Володимир Євграфович Татлін) (28 December [O.S. 16 December] 1885 – 31 May 1953) was a Russian and Soviet painter, architect, and stage-designer. Tatlin achieved fame as the architect who designed The Monument to the Third International, more commonly known as Tatlin's Tower, which he began in 1919. With Kazimir Malevich he was one of the two most important figures in the Soviet avant-garde art movement of the 1920s, and he later became an important artist in the constructivist movement.

== Biography ==
According to various accounts Vladimir Yevgrafovich Tatlin was born either in Moscow or in Kharkov, Russian Empire. His father, Yevgraf Nikoforovich Tatlin was a hereditary nobleman from Oryol, a mechanical engineer who graduated from the Technological Institute in St.Petersburg and was employed by the Moscow-Brest Railway in Moscow. His mother, Nadezhda Nikolaevna Tatlina (Bart) was a poet and was a sympathizer of the Narodnaya Volya revolutionary movement. After her death in 1887, his father remarried and moved to Kharkov. Tatlin lived with his father after failing entrance examinations for the Moscow School of Painting, Sculpture and Architecture. His father died in 1904, and young Vladimir had to interrupt his studies at the Kharkov Arts School and left for Odessa where he became a merchant marine cadet. According to his memoirs, the sea and distant lands gave him both means of subsistence and a source of inspiration; he sailed all across the Black Sea and also to Egypt.

From 1905 and 1910 he studied at N. Selivestrov Penza Art School in Penza. During the summer vacations he traveled to Moscow and St. Petersburg to participate in various art events. In 1911 he resettled to Moscow, where he lived with his uncle and began his art career as an icon painter. He also played the bandura, a Ukrainian folk instrument he picked up when living in Kharkov, and performed abroad as a professional bandurist, accompanying his own singing in Ukrainian.

Tatlin became familiar with the work of Pablo Picasso during a trip to Paris in 1913.

Tatlin achieved fame as the architect who designed the huge monument to the Third International, also known as Tatlin's Tower. Tatlin began to design it in 1919. The monument was to be a tall tower made of iron, glass and steel which would have dwarfed the Eiffel Tower in Paris (the Monument to the Third International was a third taller at 400 meters high). Inside the iron-and-steel structure of twin spirals, the design envisaged three building blocks, covered with glass windows, which would rotate at different speeds (the first one, a cube, once a year; the second one, a pyramid, once a month; the third one, a cylinder, once a day). The entire building was to house the executive and legislature of the Comintern, and be a central area for the creation and dissemination of propaganda. For financial and practical reasons, however, the tower was never built.

Tatlin was also regarded as a progenitor of Soviet post-revolutionary constructivist art with his pre-revolutionary counter-reliefs, three-dimensional constructions made of wood and metal, some placed in corners (corner counter-reliefs) and others more conventionally. Tatlin conceived these sculptures in order to question the traditional ideas of art, though he did not regard himself as a constructivist and objected to many of the movement's ideas. Later prominent constructivists included Varvara Stepanova, Alexander Rodchenko, Manuel Rendón Seminario, Joaquín Torres García, László Moholy-Nagy, Antoine Pevsner and Naum Gabo.

Although colleagues at the beginning of their careers, Tatlin and Malevich quarrelled fiercely and publicly at the time of the 0.10 Exhibition in 1915 (long before the birth of constructivism), also called "the last futurist exhibition", apparently over the 'suprematist' works Malevich exhibited there. This led Malevich to develop his ideas further in the city of Vitebsk, where he found a school called UNOVIS (Champions of the New Art).

Tatlin also dedicated himself to the study of clothes, and various objects, and flight, culminating in the construction of Letatlin personal flying apparatus.

Tatlin taught and directed the theatre, film and photography department at the Kyiv Art Institute from 1925 to 1927. In 1930 he taught in Kyiv where one of his students was Joseph Karakis.

From the 1930s Tatlin worked for different theatres in Moscow and during the Great Patriotic War, in Gorky (Nizhny Novgorod). He also worked for and with many Soviet art organizations, including the department of Fine Arts (IZO) of Narkompros.

In 1948 he was heavily criticized for his allegedly anti-communist stance and lost his job, but was not repressed.

Tatlin died in 1953 in Moscow and was buried at the Novodevichy Cemetery.

== Gallery of works ==
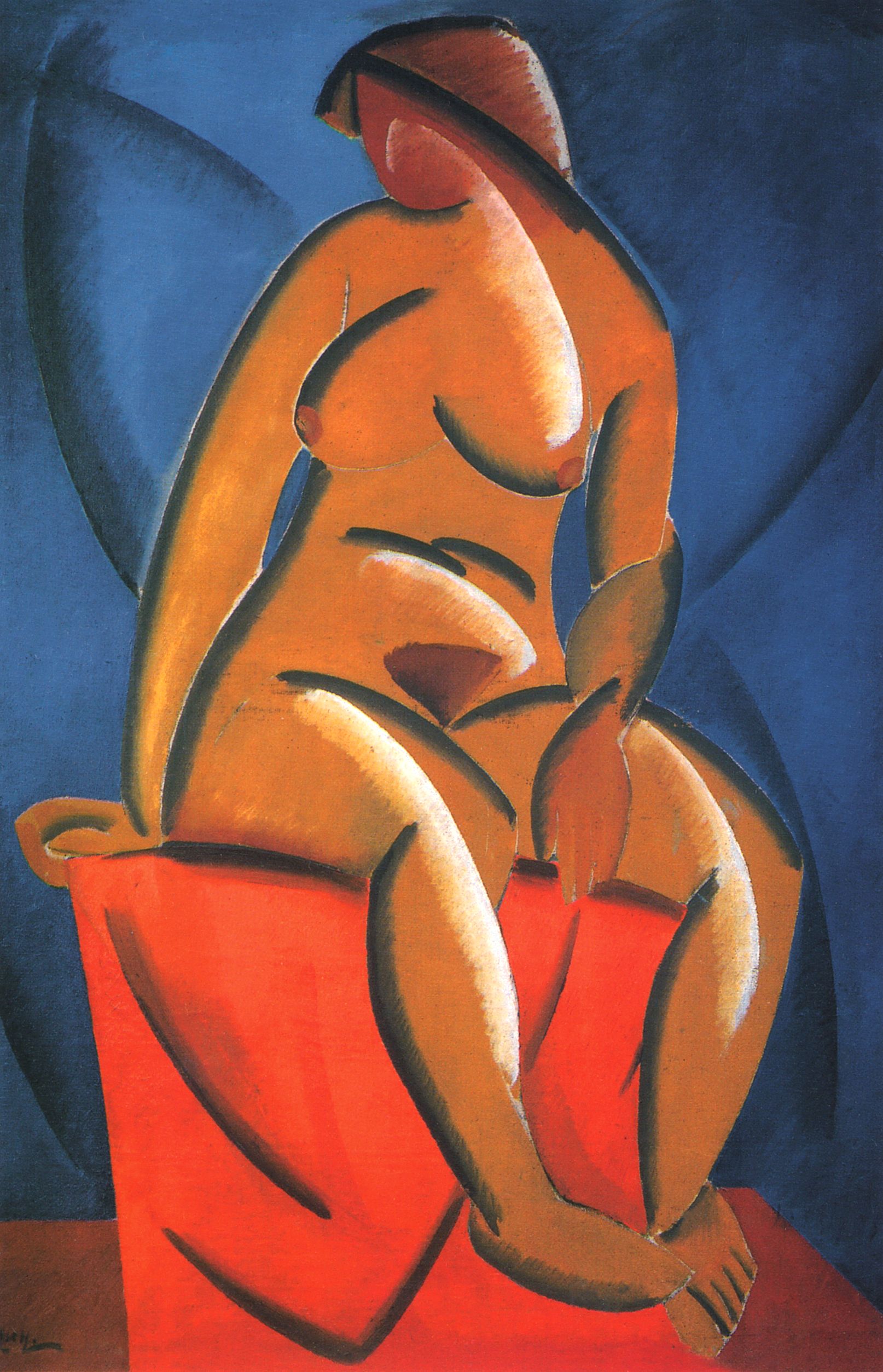
Tatlin, 1913, Female Model / Натурщица, oil on canvas

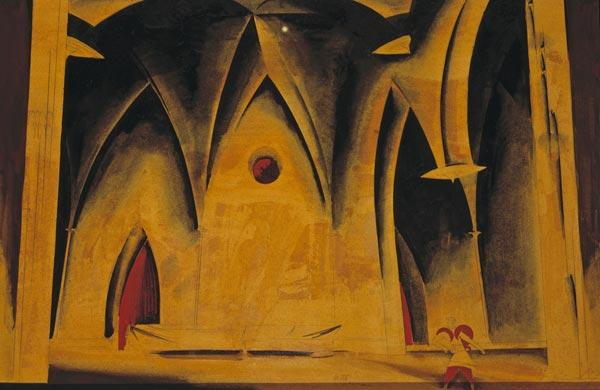
Tatlin 1913, scene design for the play 'A Life for the Tsar'

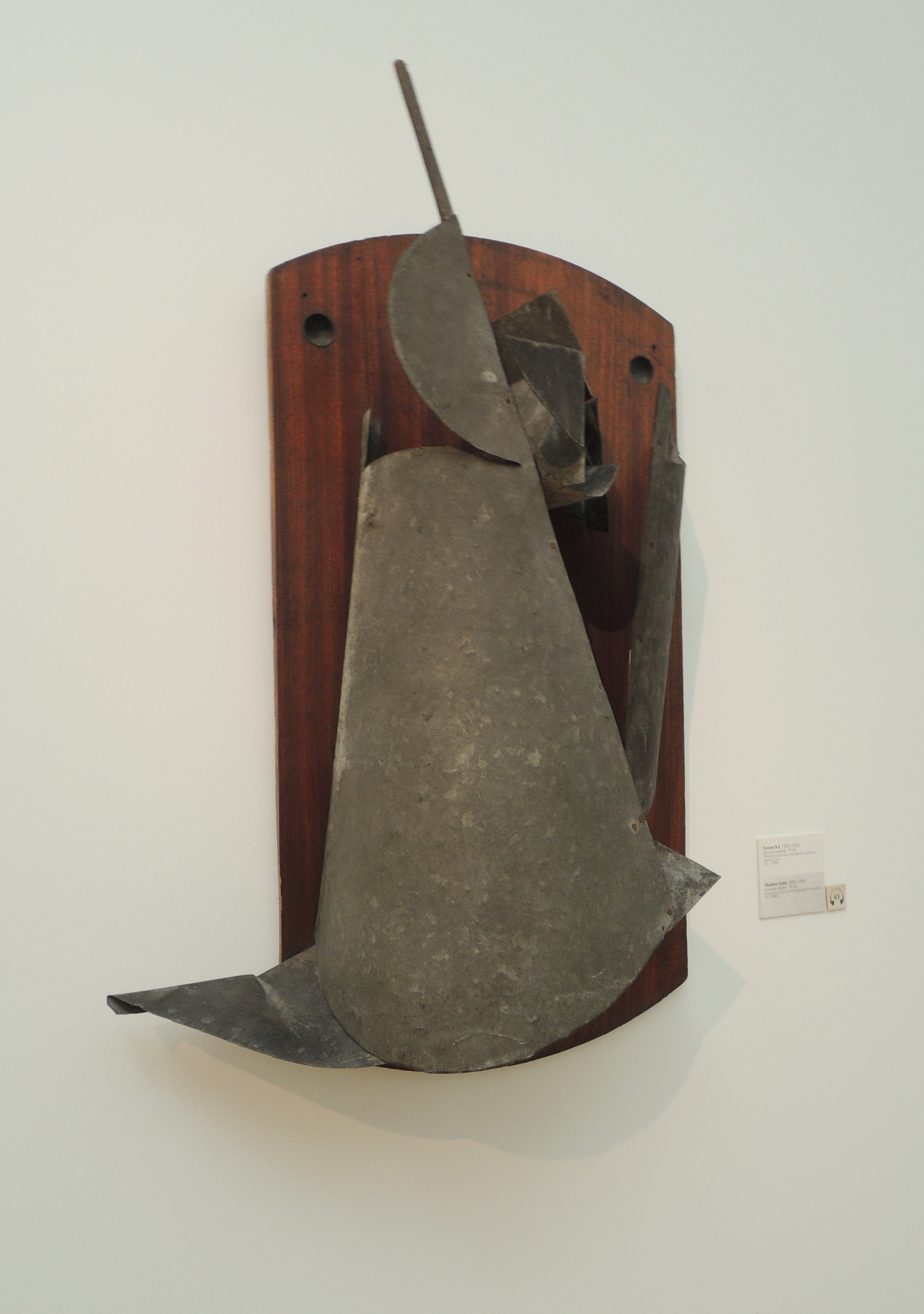
Tatlin, 1916, Counter-relief, sculpture of several materials

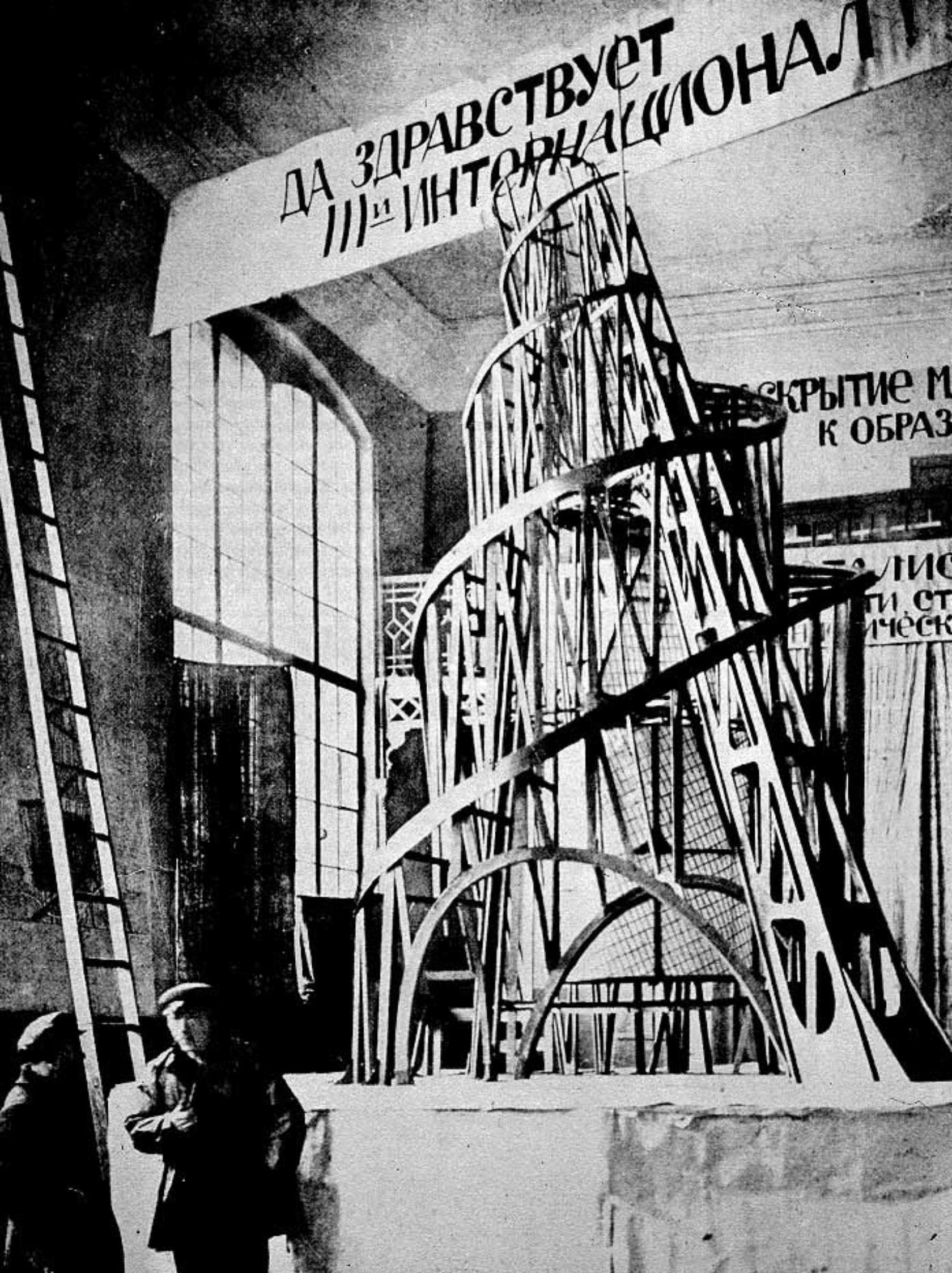
Tatlin, 1919–20, Tatlin's Tower, official title: Monument to the Third International, the design was never built

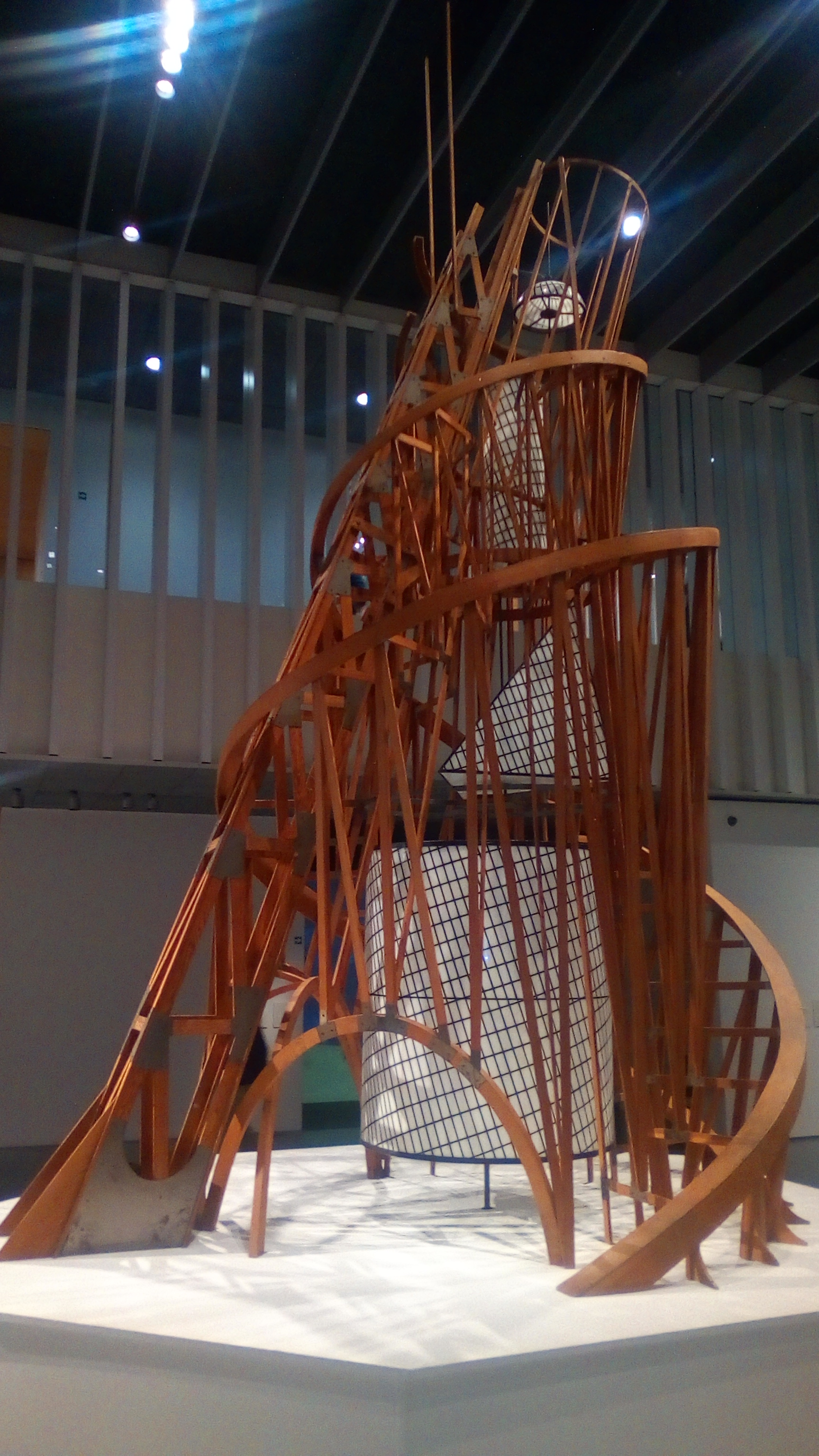
Tatlin, 1919–20, recently made copy of Tatlin's tower, Monument to the Third International, a later model

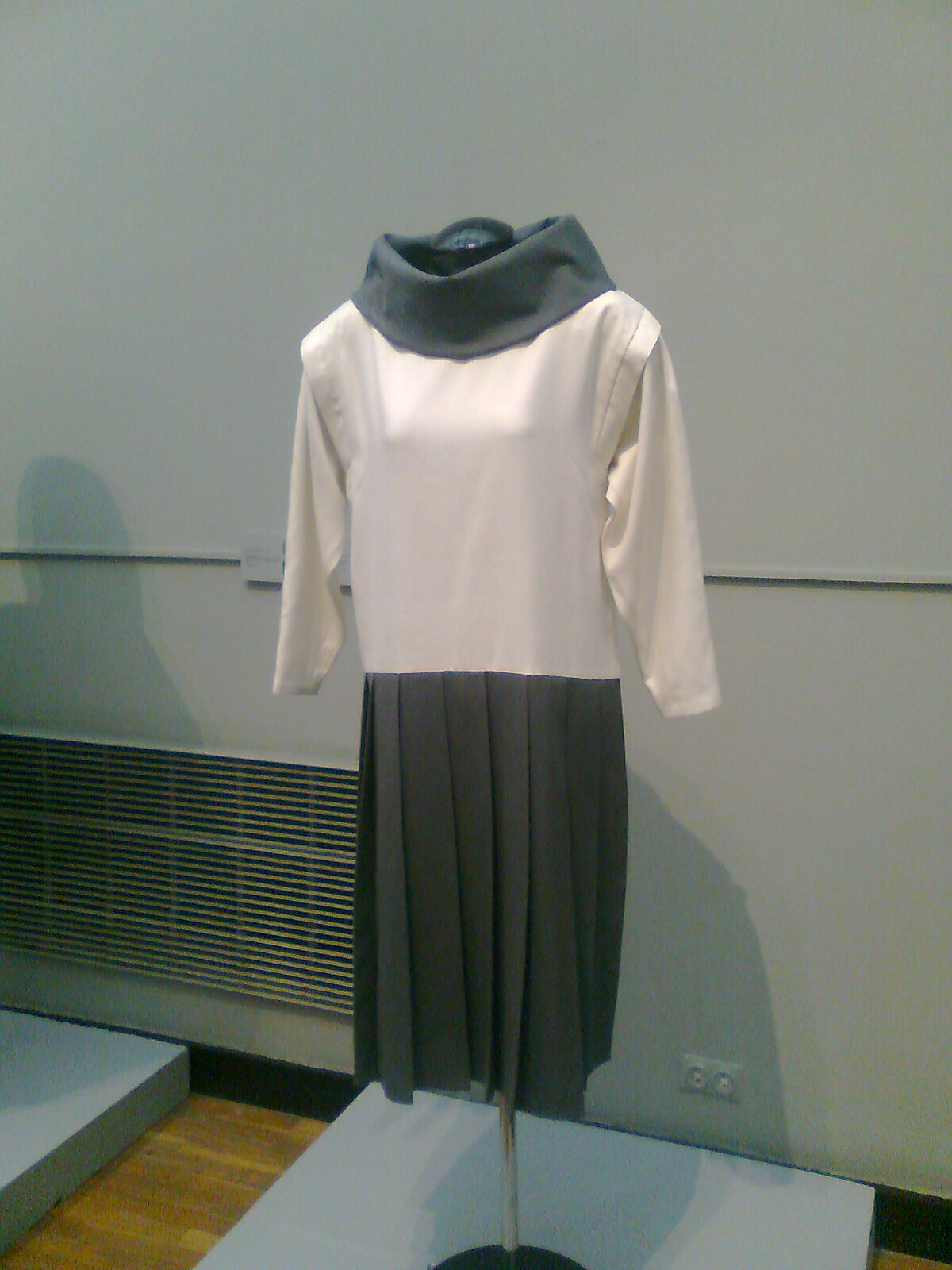
Tatlin, 1920s, dress-design

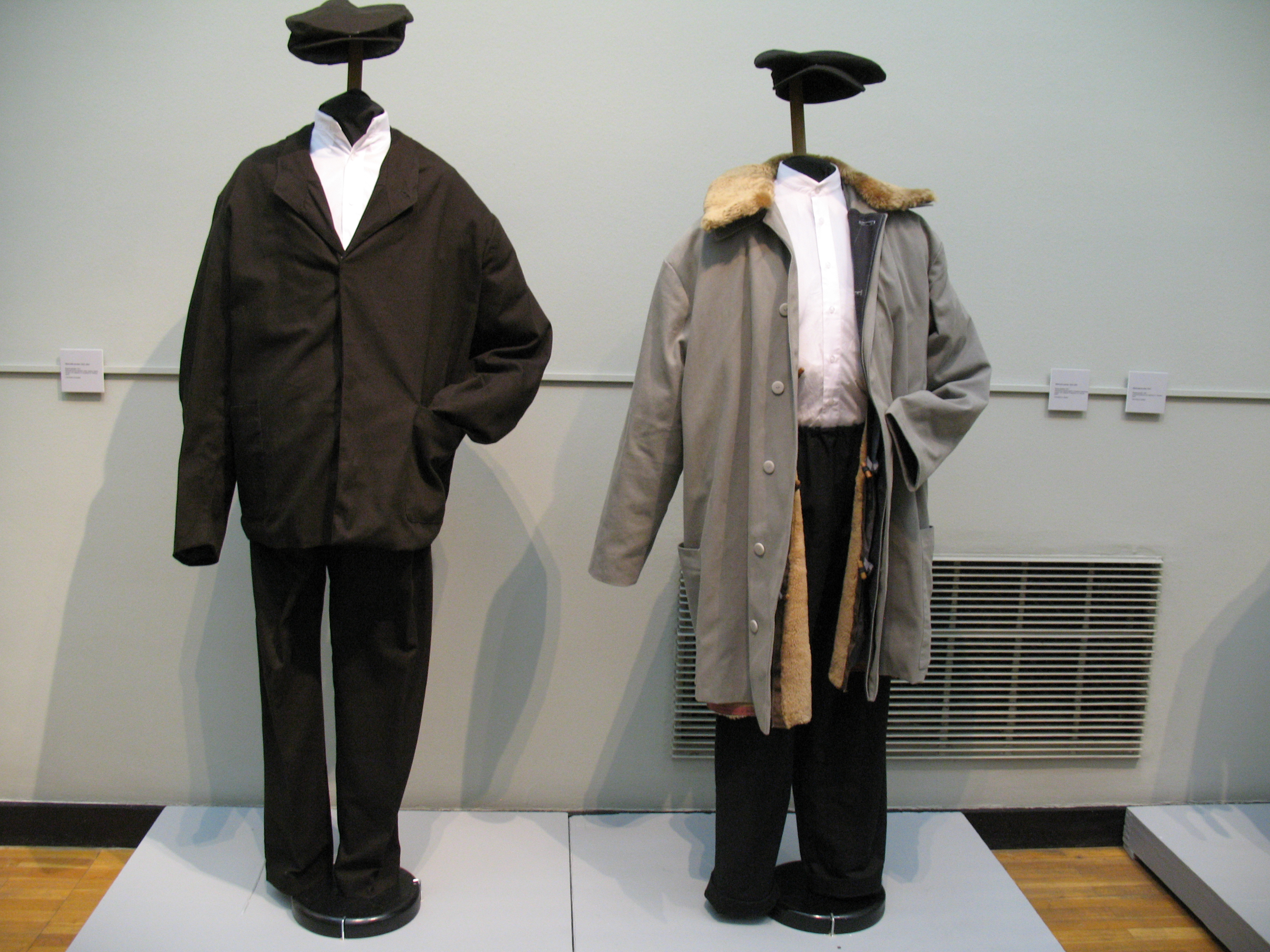
Tatlin, 1923–24, Costumes

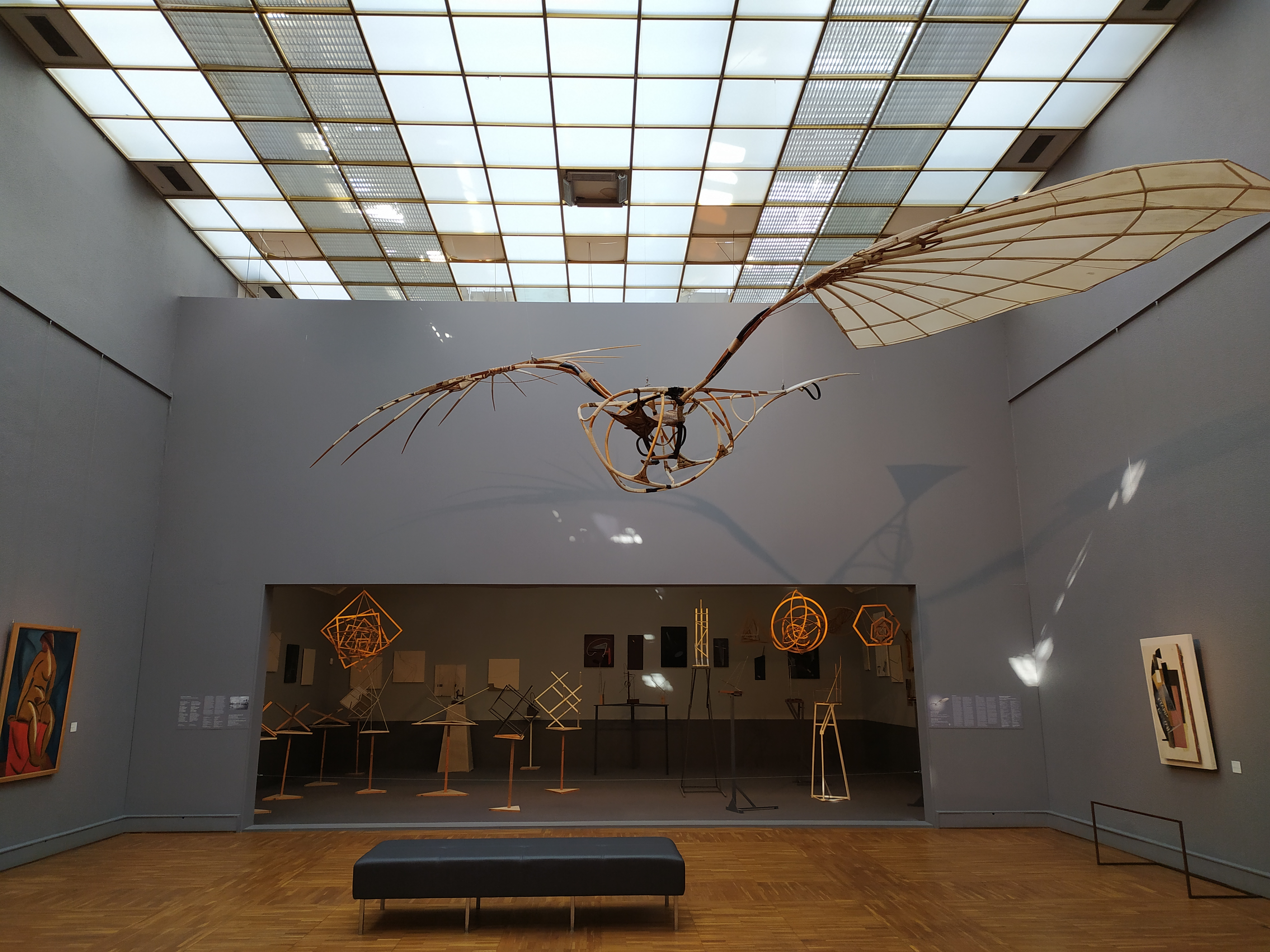
Tatlin, 1929–1931: Letatlin № 1., sculpture; human-powered ornithopter

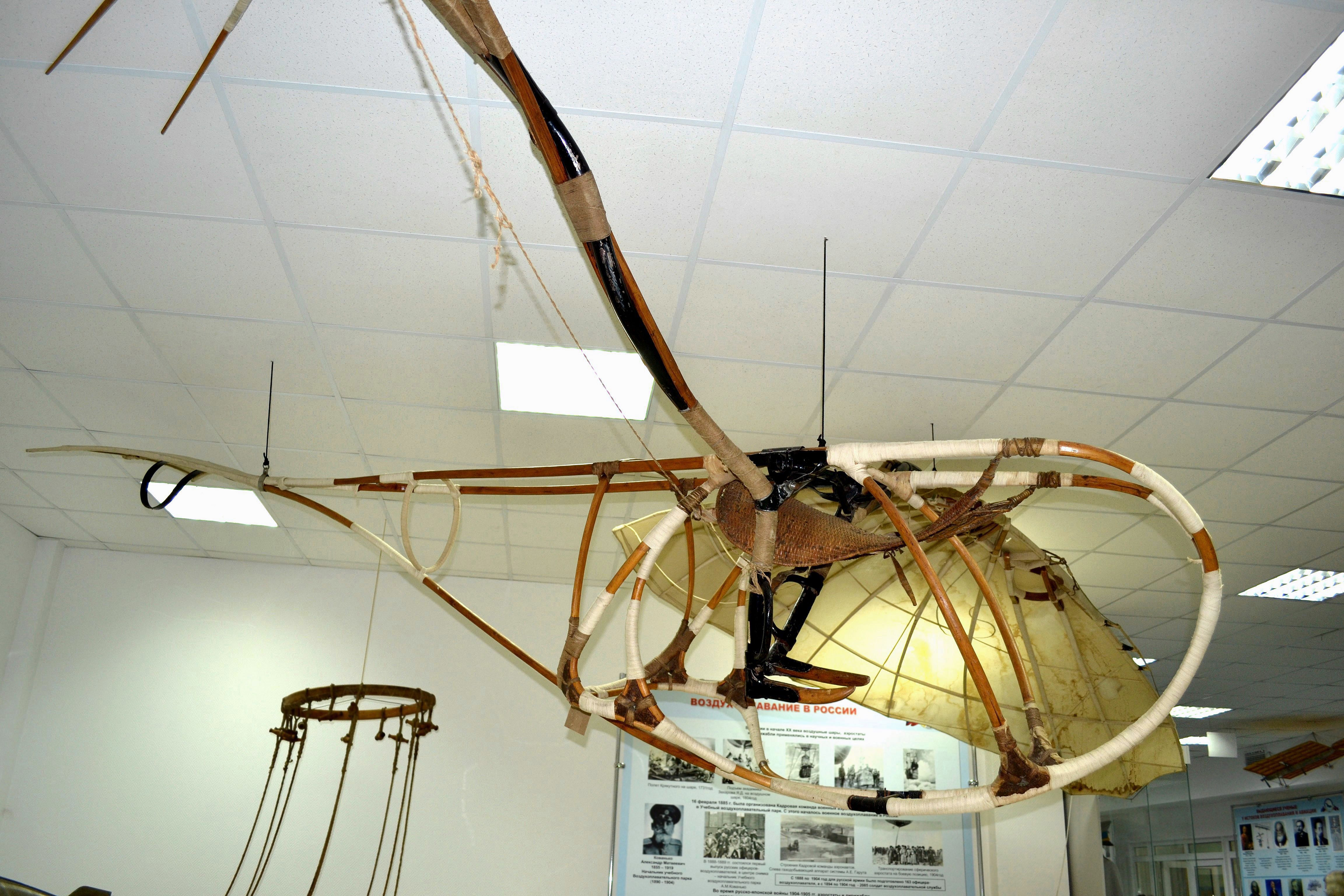
Tatlin, 1930–1932, Letatlin № 3., sculpture; human-powered ornithopter

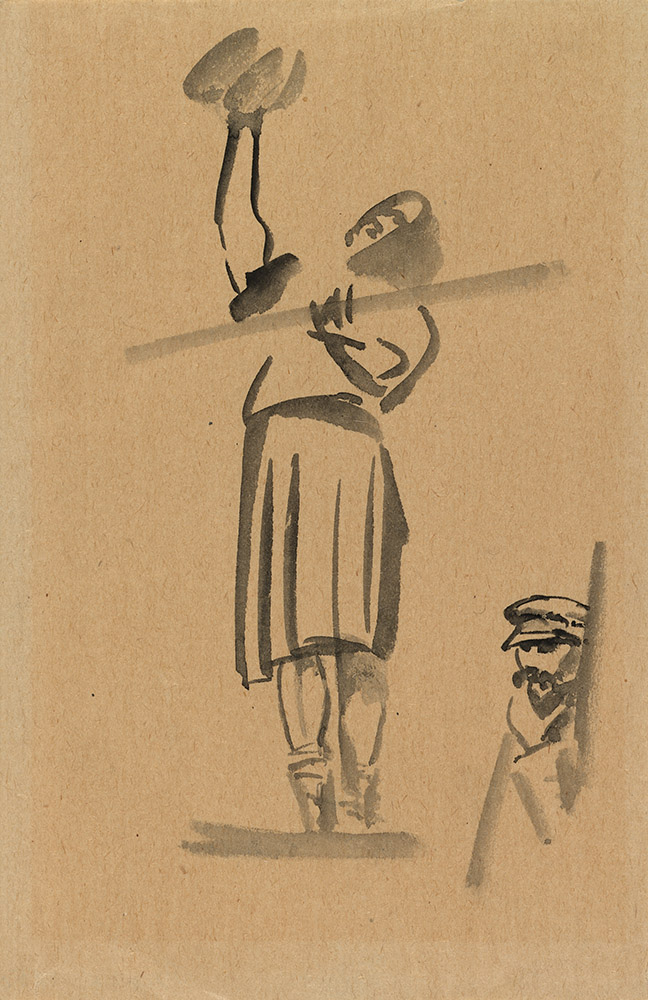
Tatlin, c. 1942, Window Cleaner and Portrait of V., brush on paper

== Bibliography ==
- Юнаков, О. (2016). Архитектор Иосиф Каракис. Алмаз. ISBN 978-1-68082-000-3.
