= Akane-chan =

Japanese manga series

- Misokkasu
- Promotional image for the anime

みそっかす
- Manga
- Written by: Tetsuya Chiba
- Published by: Kodansha
- Magazine: Shōjo Friend
- Original run: April 1968 – September 1968
- Volumes: 4
- Anime television series

Akane-chan
- Directed by: Bonjin Nagaki; Yasuo Yamaguchi (episode directors)
- Music by: Keiichi Awano
- Studio: Toei Animation
- Original network: Fuji TV
- Original run: April 4, 1968 – September 29, 1968
- Episodes: 26

Misokkasu (Japanese: みそっかす) is a Japanese shōjo manga series by Tetsuya Chiba. It was serialized in Shōjo Friend, published by Kodansha, from April to September 1968, and adapted into an anime series titled Akane-chan (あかねちゃん; "Little Miss Akane") by Toei.

== Plot ==
A cute young girl, Akane formerly lived in the countryside with her grandfather, but decides to return home to Tokyo and go to a prestigious school. However, coming from the country has its downfalls, and Akane soon realizes that she doesn't fit in with the snobby rich kids at school. Nonetheless, she finds a friend in a delinquent kid named Hidemaro. He is consistently the victim of bullying, and Akane begins to stand up for him. At school, the pair find a dog, which they ironically name Chibi despite its great stature. Akane, Hidemaro, and Chibi begin their zany, comedic misadventures.

=== Volume 1 ===
Akane Kamijo is the third daughter of the prestigious Kamijo family, but was taken in by her uncle Kusasuke at the age of four due to her poor health. She returns to the family for the first time in six years. However, Akane, who grew up in the Kii countryside, has no way of adapting to the elegant lifestyle of the Kamijo family. Meanwhile, Akane's father's company was in financial trouble, and due to the stress, he attempted suicide by taking sleeping pills. His death was discovered in time and he survived. Akane, who had accidentally drunk alcohol, fired a pistol that her father had hidden, and the police pursued her on suspicion of illegally possessing a handgun. Her father fled to Kii with Akane, who had gotten into the trunk of the getaway car, but in despair of life he attempted suicide by jumping off a cape near a lighthouse. Akane jumped into the sea alone to save her father. Kusasuke, who had followed the two, also jumped into the sea in an attempt to save them, but he contracted pneumonia and died. Kusasuke's last words were, "Akane's mother was actually..."

With the loss of their head of the household and their income cut off, the Kamijo family decides to turn their mansion into an apartment to earn a living, but they do not change their extravagant lifestyle. Akane transfers to Shirakaba Academy, a prestigious school where her two older sisters also attend. On her first day at school, she passes the "unusual test" set up by the chairman, but the principal takes notice of her.

=== Volume 2 ===
Although she was allowed to enroll, she soon got into trouble at school and was expelled. She managed to get through classes and tests by deceiving her classmates and teachers using hypnosis that she learned from Kusasuke. Eventually, Akane became good friends with Hidemaro Kitakoji, whose father is the president of an electric company and the PTA chairman, and Tokugawa, the handsome and most intelligent boy at the school. Hidemaro especially took a liking to Akane, and by taking care of him as his tutor, he was able to stay at the school. Although Hidemaro had been pampered by those around him as a rich boy, he had never had an adult who truly cared about him, and so he was no good at anything he did. However, thanks to Akane's influence, he gradually grew to have self-confidence.

Through the efforts of the school's vice principal, Oniyama, it was decided that Akane and Hidemaro would participate in the "National Test Tournament," a competition between geniuses and talented students from around the country. The plan of Oniyama and his confidants was to have the two, who were originally terrible at studying, take the test, and use their poor performance to make the current chairman and others responsible. Ultimately, they would take over the position of principal.

=== Volume 3 ===
At first, Akane tried to get out of the situation by putting the examiner to sleep using her hypnosis skills. But after learning of the evil plan of Vice Principal Oniyama and his group, and seeing Hidemaro's serious attitude towards studying, she repented and realized that if she didn't get good grades, the school would be taken over. So, she studied hard with Hidemaro. The class teacher, Mr. Tsuda, also knew about this and helped Akane and the others with their studies. A week later, the national exams finally began, and Akane, leaving other geniuses and prodigies in the dust, completed the exams without any cheating. Hidemaro had studied well in math and science, scoring 100 points, an astonishing feat. However, Akane was disqualified, even though she had achieved perfect scores in all four subjects, the first time in the history of the test. This was because she had written something other than the answer on her answer sheet. However, what she had written was an accusation of the wrongdoings of Vice Principal Oniyama and others. This caught the eye of the Minister of Education, who happened to be inspecting the exams, who called for a police investigation, and everything came to light. Thus, Akane saved the school from crisis, and even earned the honor of being the "school with the highest score in history," before leaving the school and returning to the Kamijo family.

When Akane returned to the Kamijo family, there was no trace of its former prestigious status. The family was so exhausted that they struggled with money every day, and her sisters' lives were also in disarray. Akane headed to Kii in a late-night truck, as if to escape from the completely changed Kamijo family. Sakura, the youngest daughter who was fed up with the Kamijo family, also came with Akane. Sakura said something that concerned her, "Sometimes your father came to our house," but Akane didn't even pay it any attention.

When they arrived in Kii, they found their father, who was supposed to be dead. In fact, his suicide attempt had failed, and he had survived. Instead, he had apologized for his brother Kusasuke's death and was guarding his grave in Kusasuke's hut.

While living in the Kii wilderness, her father had regained his humanity, but he would still occasionally drop in to check on the Kamijo household. However, he refused to go back to the way things were before, and because he felt guilty, he never set foot inside the house. Sakura watched as he turned back.

The three wrote a letter to their mother and sister who remained at the Kamijo family home, telling them that their father was alive and that they should come to Kii, where there was beautiful nature. A few days later, their father once again told Akane that their mother was their real mother, and informed her that their mother and sisters were coming to Kii. Around the time that their mother and sisters came to Kii, having handed over the mansion to the tenants, Hidemaro, who was also in love with Akane, found a place for her and came to the coast by boat. It seemed that the Kii coast was about to become lively.

== Books ==
1. Kodansha Comics "Akane-chan" 4 volumes (1968, Kodansha) * Shinsho edition
2. Home Comics "Misokkasu" 3 volumes (1976, Shiobunsha)
3. Chiba Tetsuya Manga Bunko "Misokkasu" 3 volumes (1977, Kodansha) *Paperback edition
4. KC Friend "Misokkasu" 3 volumes (1981, Kodansha) * Shinsho edition
5. A collection of manga masterpieces for mothers and daughters, "Misokkasu" 2 volumes (1987, Kusanone Publishing Association)
6. Chiba Tetsuya Complete Works "Misokkasu" 3 volumes (1998, Homesha)
7. "Akane-chan" 4 volumes (2002, Kodansha) * On-demand version

== TV show ==
It was adapted into a monochrome 1968 Toei anime series with the same name directed by Fusahito Nagaki, Yasuo Yamaguchi, Yugo Serikawa and Takeshi Tamiya, which was originally broadcast on Fuji TV.

According to Jonathan Clements and Helen McCarthy's The Anime Encyclopedia, it was "deliberately designed to evoke a distant, carefree time of rural childhood for city kids deprived of the opportunity, placing it in the same spirit as My Neighbor Totoro." It has been debated that the anime is a more simplified version of the more in-depth themes of the manga.

Opening Theme:

"Akane-chan Song" by Minori Matsushima

Ending Theme:

"Hidebaro Song" by Kazue Takahashi

=== Characters ===
- Akane Kamijo (Voiced by: Minori Matsushima)
- Hidemaro Kitajoji (Voiced by: Kazue Takahashi)
- Sakura Kamijo (Voiced by: Kazuko Sugiyama)
- Mrs. Kamijo (Voiced by: Haruko Yajima)
- Mr. Kamijo (Voiced by: Toshiya Ogata)
