= Theodore Ushev =

Bulgarian animator and filmmaker

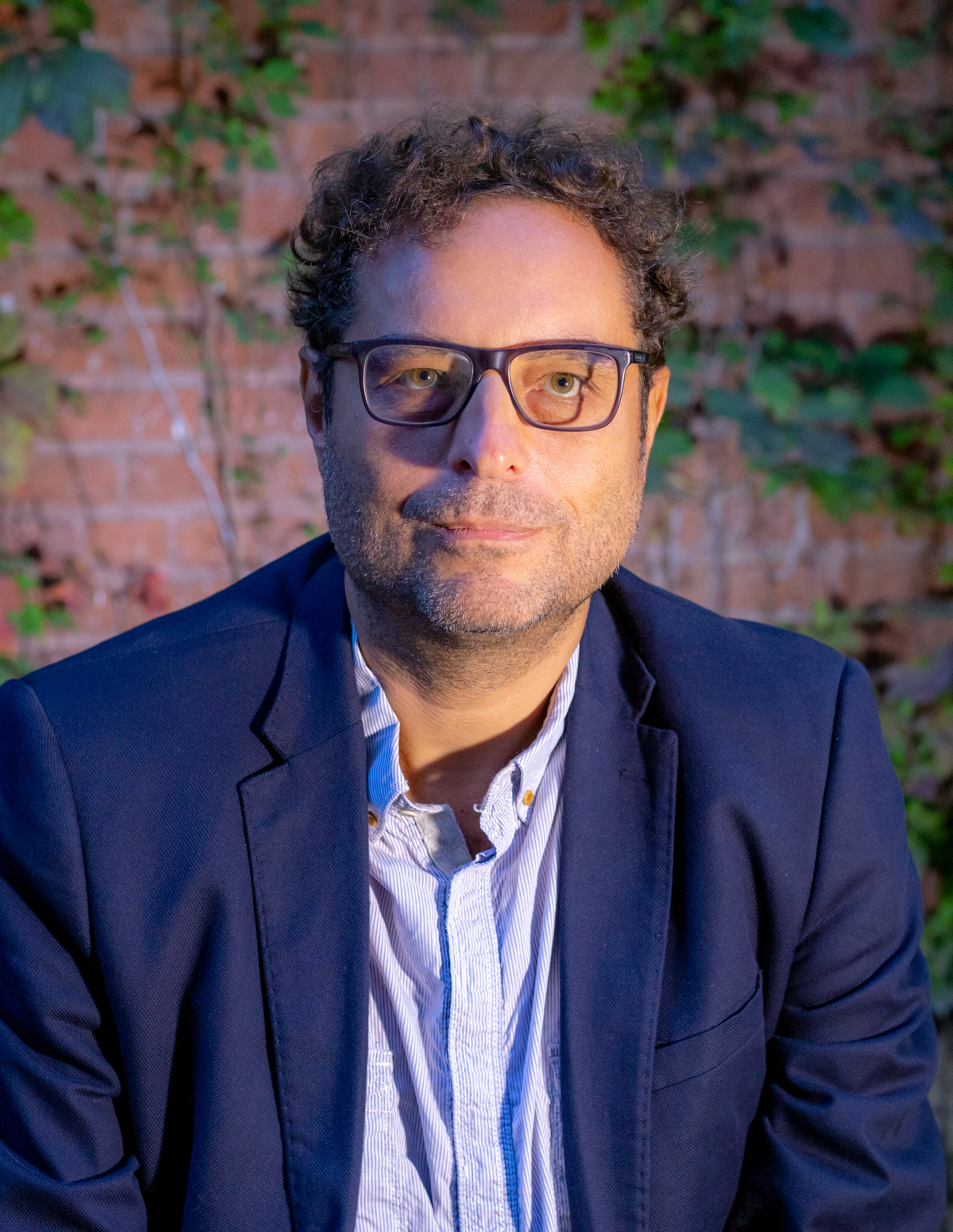
- Ushev at the 2019 Sommets du cinéma d'animation
- Born: Theodore Asenov Ushev; February 4, 1968 (age 57); Kyustendil, Bulgaria
- Occupations: Animator; film director; screenwriter
- Years active: 1999–present
- Known for: Blind Vaysha; The Physics of Sorrow

Theodore Asenov Ushev (Bulgarian: Теодор Асенов Ушев; born 4 February 1968) is a Bulgarian animator, film director and screenwriter based in Montreal. He is best known for his work at the National Film Board of Canada, including the 2016 animated short Blind Vaysha, which was nominated for an Academy Award. He is a Chevalier of the Ordre des Arts et des Lettres of France.

== Life and career ==
Ushev was born on 4 February 1968 in Kyustendil, Bulgaria, and graduated in stage decoration, animation, and make-up at Plovdiv's School of Scenic Arts. He obtained a master's degree in graphic design from the National Academy of Art in Sofia. He first made a name as a poster and graphic designer, before moving to Montreal in 1999. There he quickly gained a reputation as an animation filmmaker with for the National Film Board of Canada (NFB), with films such as Vertical (2003), The Man Who Waited (2006), Tower Bawher (2006), Sou (2006), Tzartitza (2007) and Drux Flux (2008), winner of the Canadian Film Institute Award for Best Canadian Animation at the Ottawa International Animation Festival. In 2010, he completed a short animated documentary about Arthur Lipsett, entitled Lipsett Diaries. In March 2011, Lipsett Diaries received the Genie Award for Best Animated Short at the 31st Genie Awards.

He created live show multimedia and promo animations for the British band Public Symphony and David Gilmour's In an Island album and live tour, and the illustrations for Chris Robinson' book Ballad of a Thin Man: In Search of Ryan Larkin (2008).

The third film from his 20th-century trilogy, Gloria Victoria (2013), was named Most Well Liked Animated Short of 2013. In a survey of fifteen respected festival programmers and critics who were each asked to name the best animated shorts of 2013, the film that came out on top was Gloria Victoria. Produced at the National Film Board of Canada, the film was selected by 11 out of 15 people surveyed. The film also got a nomination at 2014 Hollywood's Annie Awards.

=== Blind Vaysha ===
Blind Vaysha won the Academy of Canadian Cinema and Television Award for Best Animated Short at 5th Canadian Screen Awards. It received the Jury Award and Junior Jury Award at the Annecy International Animated Film Festival, and had its North American premiere at the 2016 Toronto International Film Festival. In September 2016, it received the Cartoon Network Award for Best Narrative Short Animation and the Canadian Film Institute Award for Best Canadian Animation at the 40th Ottawa International Animation Festival. Blind Vaysha was also included in the list of "Canada's Top Ten" shorts of 2016, selected by a panel of filmmakers and industry professionals organized by TIFF.

The film was also nominated for Best Animated Short at the 89th Academy Awards. Ushev stated that with 16 films to his credit to date, he had given up hope of ever being nominated for an Oscar because he worried that his films might be "too abstract, too avant garde, too elitist, too dark" for the academy. He stated that upon hearing the news of his Oscar nomination, he had a strong emotional reaction: "When I heard the name of my film, I just stopped watching, because I fainted... I cried. At first I laughed and then I cried again. It's out of control.... It's all strange and exciting."

== Installation works ==
His keen interest for the new visual forms led him to experiments with installations, interactive works on public spaces and virtual reality. His last works are "Diagonales" on the facade of Montreal Public Library, the installation Third page from the Sun and the film-action 100 prints of Norman. Erased. in which he erases prints of the animation legend Norman McLaren during 10 days in an aquarium at the Museum of Civilisation in Quebec.

== Filmography ==
- 1999: Aurora
- 2003: Well-Tempered Heads
- 2003: Vertical
- 2003: Here Comes a Miracle
- 2006: Tower Bawher
- 2006: The Man Who Waited (L'homme qui attendait)
- 2006: Sou
- 2007: Tzaritza
- 2008: Drux Flux
- 2010: Lipsett Diaries (Les journaux de Lipsett)
- 2011: Nightingales in December (Rossignols en décembre)
- 2012: Demoni
- 2012: Joda
- 2013: Gloria Victoria
- 2014: 3rd Page from the Sun (3e page après le soleil)
- 2015: The Sleepwalker (Sonámbulo)
- 2016: Blind Vaysha (Vaysha l'aveugle)
- 2018: 8’19”
- 2019: The Physics of Sorrow (Physique de la tristesse)
- 2020: Barcelona Burning (Barcelona de Foc)
- 2022: Phi 1.618
- 2024: The Wolf (Le Loup)

== See also ==
- List of Bulgarian Academy Award winners and nominees
- List of European Academy Award winners and nominees
