= Drux Flux =

2008 animated short

Drux Flux is a 2008 animated short by Theodore Ushev, inspired by Herbert Marcuse’s treatise One-Dimensional Man.

A film without words, Drux Flux uses figurative and abstract imagery to portray people as crushed by industry and progress. The film features a musical score by Alexander Mossolov, and was produced in Montreal by the National Film Board of Canada.

Ushev began work on the film in 2007. The NFB had asked him to create a 3-D version of Tower Bawher, but finding the work tedious, the filmmaker decided to begin work on Drux Flux instead. The two films are similar in style, both utilizing Soviet constructivist imagery and Russian classical music score.

Drux Flux received the Canadian Film Institute Award for Best Canadian Animation at the Ottawa International Animation Film Festival, and was nominated for best animated short at the 29th Genie Awards.
