= List of awards and nominations received by Maria Bakalova =

Maria Bakalova awards and nominations
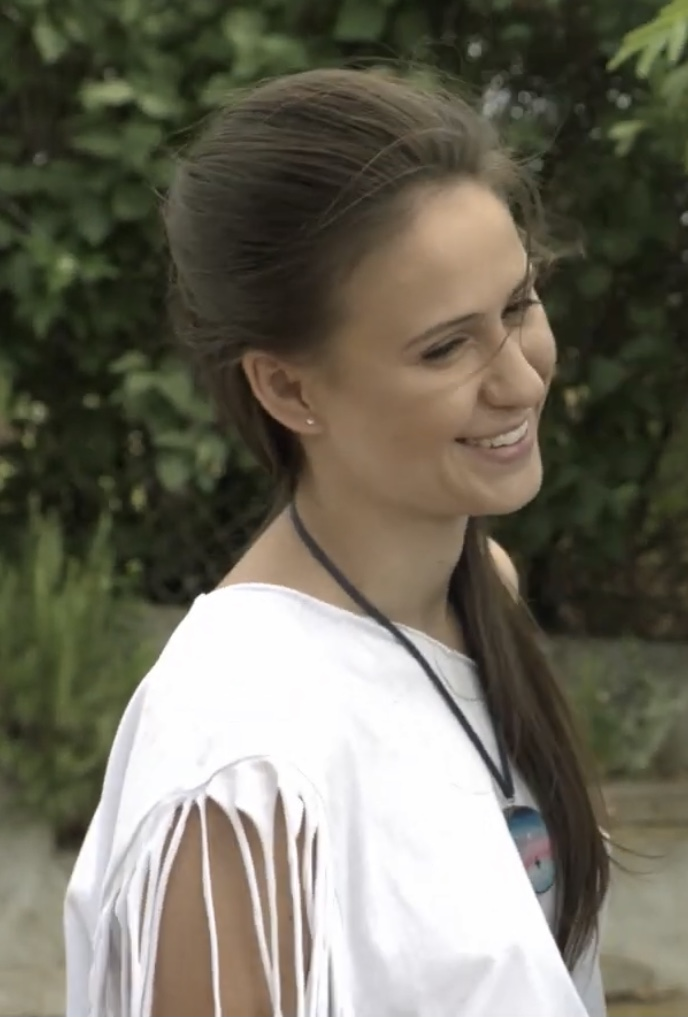
- Bakalova on the set of Last Call in 2019
Awards and nominations
Award	Wins	Nominations
Academy Awards	0	1
BAFTAs	0	1
Critics' Choice Awards	1	1
Golden Globe Awards	0	1
Screen Actors Guild Awards	0	1
Other awards and nominations	36	64

Totals (Note: Certain award groups do not simply award one winner. They acknowledge several different recipients, have runners-up, and have third place. Since this is a specific recognition and is different from losing an award, runner-up mentions are considered wins in this award tally. For simplification and to avoid errors, each award in this list has been presumed to have had a prior nomination.)
- Wins: 37
- Nominations: 69

Bulgarian actress Maria Bakalova has received various awards and nominations for her acting performances. She has won one Critics' Choice Movie Award, and her major nominations include an Academy Award, a Golden Globe Award, a BAFTA Award and a Screen Actors Guild Award. Her other accolades include numerous critics association and film festival awards.

Bakalova's breakthrough role as Tutar Sagdiyev in the 2020 mockumentary Borat Subsequent Moviefilm earned her an Academy Award nomination for Best Supporting Actress, making her the first Bulgarian actress to be nominated for an Oscar. She was also the first Bulgarian, and the first actress from Eastern Europe since Ida Kamińska in 1967, to be nominated at the Golden Globe Awards, receiving a nomination for Best Actress in a Motion Picture Comedy or Musical.

== Awards and nominations ==
Awards and nominations received by Maria Bakalova
Award	Year (Note: Indicates the year of ceremony)	Nominated work	Category	Result	Ref.
AACTA Awards	2021	Borat Subsequent Moviefilm	Best International Supporting Actress	Nominated	
Academy Awards	2021	Borat Subsequent Moviefilm	Best Supporting Actress	Nominated	
Alliance of Women Film Journalists	2020	Borat Subsequent Moviefilm	Best Supporting Actress	Nominated	
Alliance of Women Film Journalists	2020	Borat Subsequent Moviefilm	Most Daring Performance Award	Won	
Askeer Awards	2021	Herself	Ambassador of Bulgarian Acting	Won	
Atlanta Film Critics Circle	2021	Borat Subsequent Moviefilm	Best Supporting Actress	Won	
Austin Film Critics Association	2021	Borat Subsequent Moviefilm	Best Supporting Actress	Nominated	
BAFTA Film Awards	2021	Borat Subsequent Moviefilm	Best Actress in a Supporting Role	Nominated	
Boston Online Film Critics Association	2020	Borat Subsequent Moviefilm	Best Supporting Actress	Won	
Chicago Film Critics Association	2020	Borat Subsequent Moviefilm	Best Supporting Actress	Won	
Chicago Film Critics Association	2020	Borat Subsequent Moviefilm	Most Promising Performer	Nominated	
Chicago Indie Critics	2020	Borat Subsequent Moviefilm	Best Supporting Actress	Won	
Columbus Film Critics Association	2020	Borat Subsequent Moviefilm	Best Supporting Actress	Nominated	
Critics' Choice Awards	2021	Borat Subsequent Moviefilm	Best Supporting Actress	Won	
Dallas–Fort Worth Film Critics Association	2021	Borat Subsequent Moviefilm	Best Supporting Actress	4th place	
Detroit Film Critics Society	2021	Borat Subsequent Moviefilm	Best Supporting Actress	Nominated	
Detroit Film Critics Society	2021	Borat Subsequent Moviefilm	Breakthrough Performance	Won	
Dorian Awards	2020	Borat Subsequent Moviefilm	Best Supporting Actress	Nominated	
Dorian Awards	2020	Herself	Rising Star Award	Nominated	
Denver Film Critics	2020	Borat Subsequent Moviefilm	Best Supporting Actress	Nominated	
Florida Film Critics Circle	2020	Borat Subsequent Moviefilm	Best Supporting Actress	Won	
Florida Film Critics Circle	2020	Borat Subsequent Moviefilm	Breakout Award	Runner-up	
Georgia Film Critics Association	2021	Borat Subsequent Moviefilm	Best Supporting Actress	Won	
Gold Derby Awards	2021	Borat Subsequent Moviefilm	Breakthrough Performer	Won	
Gold Derby Awards	2021	Borat Subsequent Moviefilm	Supporting Actress	Nominated	
Golden Globe Awards	2020	Borat Subsequent Moviefilm	Best Actress – Motion Picture Comedy or Musical	Nominated	
Golden Raspberry Awards	2021	Borat Subsequent Moviefilm	Worst Screen Combo (shared with Rudy Giuliani) (Note: Bakalova was taken off the final ballot and replaced with "[Giuliani's] pants zipper".)	—N/a	
Greater Western New York Film Critics Association	2020	Borat Subsequent Moviefilm	Best Supporting Actress	Nominated	
Hawaii Film Critics Society	2021	Borat Subsequent Moviefilm	Best Supporting Actress	Nominated	
Houston Film Critics Society	2020	Borat Subsequent Moviefilm	Best Supporting Actress	Won	
Indiana Film Journalists Association Awards	2020	Borat Subsequent Moviefilm	Best Supporting Actress	Won	
Indiana Film Journalists Association Awards	2020	Borat Subsequent Moviefilm	Breakout of the Year	Won	
IndieWire Critics Poll	2020	Borat Subsequent Moviefilm	Best Performance	5th place	
Kansas City Film Critics Circle	2020	Borat Subsequent Moviefilm	Best Supporting Actress	Runner-up	
Latino Entertainment Film Awards	2021	Borat Subsequent Moviefilm	Best Supporting Actress	Nominated	
London Film Critics' Circle	2020	Borat Subsequent Moviefilm	Best Supporting Actress	Won	
MTV Movie & TV Awards	2021	Borat Subsequent Moviefilm	Best Breakthrough Performance	Nominated	
MTV Movie & TV Awards	2021	Borat Subsequent Moviefilm	Best Duo (shared with Sacha Baron Cohen)	Nominated	
Music City Film Critics Association	2020	Borat Subsequent Moviefilm	Best Supporting Actress	Won	
National Society of Film Critics	2020	Borat Subsequent Moviefilm	Best Supporting Actress	Won	
New York Film Critics Circle	2020	Borat Subsequent Moviefilm	Best Supporting Actress	Won	
New York Film Critics Online	2020	Borat Subsequent Moviefilm	Breakthrough Performer	Won	
North Carolina Film Critics Association	2020	Borat Subsequent Moviefilm	Best Supporting Actress	Nominated	
North Dakota Film Society	2020	Borat Subsequent Moviefilm	Best Supporting Actress	Won	
North Texas Film Critics Association	2020	Borat Subsequent Moviefilm	Best Supporting Actress	Nominated	
North Texas Film Critics Association	2020	Borat Subsequent Moviefilm	Best Newcomer	Nominated	
Online Association of Female Film Critics	2021	Borat Subsequent Moviefilm	Best Supporting Female	Nominated	
Online Film & Television Association Awards	2021	Borat Subsequent Moviefilm	Best Breakthrough Performance: Female	Won	
Online Film & Television Association Awards	2021	Borat Subsequent Moviefilm	Best Supporting Actress	Runner-up	
Online Film Critics Society	2020	Borat Subsequent Moviefilm	Best Supporting Actress	Won	
Phoenix Critics Circle	2021	Borat Subsequent Moviefilm	Best Supporting Actress	Nominated	
Phoenix Film Critics Society	2021	Borat Subsequent Moviefilm	Breakthrough Performance	Won	
Philadelphia Film Critics	2020	Borat Subsequent Moviefilm	Best Supporting Actress	Runner-up	
Queen Palm International Film Festival	2018	Transgression	Best Actress	Nominated	
San Diego Film Critics Society	2020	Borat Subsequent Moviefilm	Best Supporting Actress	Nominated	
San Diego Film Critics Society	2020	Borat Subsequent Moviefilm	Best Comedic Performance	Runner-up	
San Diego Film Critics Society	2020	Borat Subsequent Moviefilm	Breakthrough Artist	Nominated	
San Francisco Bay Area Film Critics Circle	2021	Borat Subsequent Moviefilm	Best Supporting Actress	Nominated	
Satellite Awards	2021	Borat Subsequent Moviefilm	Best Actress – Motion Picture	Won	
Screen Actors Guild Awards	2021	Borat Subsequent Moviefilm	Outstanding Performance by a Female Actor in a Supporting Role	Nominated	
Seattle Film Critics Society	2021	Borat Subsequent Moviefilm	Best Supporting Actress	Nominated	
Southeastern Film Critics Association Awards	2021	Borat Subsequent Moviefilm	Best Supporting Actress	Runner-up	
St. Louis Film Critics Association	2020	Borat Subsequent Moviefilm	Best Supporting Actress	Runner-up	
Toronto Alternative Film Festival	2018	Transgression	Best Actress	Won	
Toronto Film Critics Association	2021	Borat Subsequent Moviefilm	Best Supporting Actress	Won	
Utah Film Critics Association	2021	Borat Subsequent Moviefilm	Best Supporting Actress	Won	
Vancouver Film Critics Circle	2021	Borat Subsequent Moviefilm	Best Supporting Actress	Nominated	
Washington D.C. Area Film Critics Association	2021	Borat Subsequent Moviefilm	Best Supporting Actress	Nominated	

== Other honors ==
=== Listicles ===
Name of publisher, name of listicle, year(s) listed, and placement result
Publisher	Listicle	Year(s)	Result	Ref.
Forbes	30 Under 30 (in Entertainment)	2021	Placed	
Forbes	30 Under 30 (in Celebrities)	2021	Placed	
Forbes	Top 70 Bulgarian Celebrities	2021	1st	
The New York Times	Breakout Stars of 2020	2020	Placed	
Variety	10 Actors to Watch 2020	2020	Placed	
Variety	Women That Have Made an Impact in Global Entertainment	2021	Placed	

=== State honors ===
Name of country, year given, and name of honor
Country	Year	Honor	Ref.
Bulgaria	2021	Honorary citizenship of Burgas	

== See also ==
- List of Bulgarian Academy Award winners and nominees
- List of European Academy Award winners and nominees
- List of actors with Academy Award nominations
