= Transgression =

Transgression may refer to:

== Legal, religious and social ==
- Sin, transgression against divine law or the law of deities
- Crime, legal transgression, usually created by a violation of social or economic boundary
  - In civil law jurisdictions, a transgression or a contravention is a smaller breach of law, similar to summary offence in common law jurisdictions
- Social transgression, violating a social norm
- Relational transgression – violation of implicit or explicit relational rules
- Haram, going beyond Islamic religious restrictions

== Science and mathematics ==
- Transgression map in cohomology
- Transgression (geology), a relative rise in sea level resulting in deposition of marine strata over terrestrial strata
- Transgression (genetics) or Transgressive segregation, a peculiar case of heterosis, showing extreme phenotypes in a hybrid offspring

== Literature ==
- Transgressions, a 1997 novel by Sarah Dunant
- Transgressions, a novel based in the English Civil War by Erastes
- Transgressions: Volume Two, a short story collection by Stephen King and John Farris
- Transgressive fiction, a literary style

== Film, television, music, and art ==
- Transgressive art
- Transgression (1931 film), a 1931 American film directed by Herbert Brenon
- Transgression (1974 film), a 1974 South Korean film directed by Kim Ki-young
- Transgression (2011 film), a 2011 film starring Michael Ironside, Maria Grazia Cucinotta, Jonathan Keltz, and Carlos Bardem
- Transgression (2017 film), a 2017 Bulgarian film directed by Val Todorov
- Cinema of Transgression, a film movement using shock value and humor
- Transgression (album), 2005 release from industrial metal band Fear Factory

== See also ==
- Transgressive (disambiguation)
