= Override =

Override may refer to:

== Technology ==
- Manual override, a function where an automated system is placed under manual control
- Method overriding, a subclassing feature in object-oriented programming languages.

== Media ==
- Override (1994 film), a science fiction short film
- Override (upcoming film), an American science fiction survival thriller film
- Override, a song by Yoshida Yasei featuring Kasane Teto
- Override (video game), a 1991 video game by Data East
- Override: Mech City Brawl, a 2018 video game by Modus Games

== Characters ==
- Override, a character on the anime television series Transformers: Cybertron
- Overrider, a Marvel Comics mutant
- Dr. Gregory Herd, a Marvel Comics character formerly named Override

== Other uses ==
- Price override, in retail
- Overriding aorta, a medical condition in which aorta emerge from abnormal position.
- Veto override, a procedure employed by legislatures
