= Transgressive =

Transgressive may mean:

- Transgressive art, a name given to art forms that violate perceived boundaries
- Transgressive fiction, a modern style in literature
- Transgressive Records, a United Kingdom-based independent record label
- Transgressive (linguistics), a form of verb in some languages
- Transgressive phenotype, a phenotype that is more extreme than the phenotypes displayed by either of the parents
- Transgressive segregation
- Cinema of Transgression, film movement using shock value and humor

== See also ==
- Transgression (disambiguation)
