= Kaa (disambiguation) =

Kaa is a fictional character in The Jungle Book.

Kaa or KAA may also refer to:

== Arts and entertainment ==
- Kaa (1965 film), an Oriya film
- Kaa (2019 film), a Tamil thriller film

== Business and organisations ==
- Kampala Associated Advocates, a law firm in Uganda
- Kazakh American Association
- Kenya Airports Authority, the operator of civilian airports in Kenya
- Kensington Aldridge Academy, a school in London, England
- King Abdullah Academy, a Saudi Arabian international school in Virginia, U.S.
- Korea Automobile Association

== People ==
- Hone Kaa (1941–2012), a New Zealand church leader
- Keri Kaa, Hohi Ngapera Te Moana Keri Kaa, a New Zealand-born writer
- Kaa Williams, a New Zealand television presenter
- Dawson Charlie or K̲áa Goox̱ (c. 1865 – 1908), a Canadian First Nation person gold discoverer

== Places ==
- Kaa, Duff Islands, an island in the Duff Islands, Solomon Islands
- Kaa, Ghana, a community in Tolon District, Ghana
- Kasama Airport, Zambia, IATA code KAA

== Other uses ==
- Karlsruhe Accurate Arithmetic, a special approach in floating-point arithmetics
- KAA Gent, a Belgian sports club
- Karakalpak language, ISO 639-2 code: kaa
- Qa'a, also Ka'a, the last king of the First Dynasty of Egypt

== See also ==
- KAAA (disambiguation)
- Kaas (disambiguation)
- Kaja (name)
