= Maria Bakalova =

Bulgarian actress (born 1996)

- Мария Бакалова
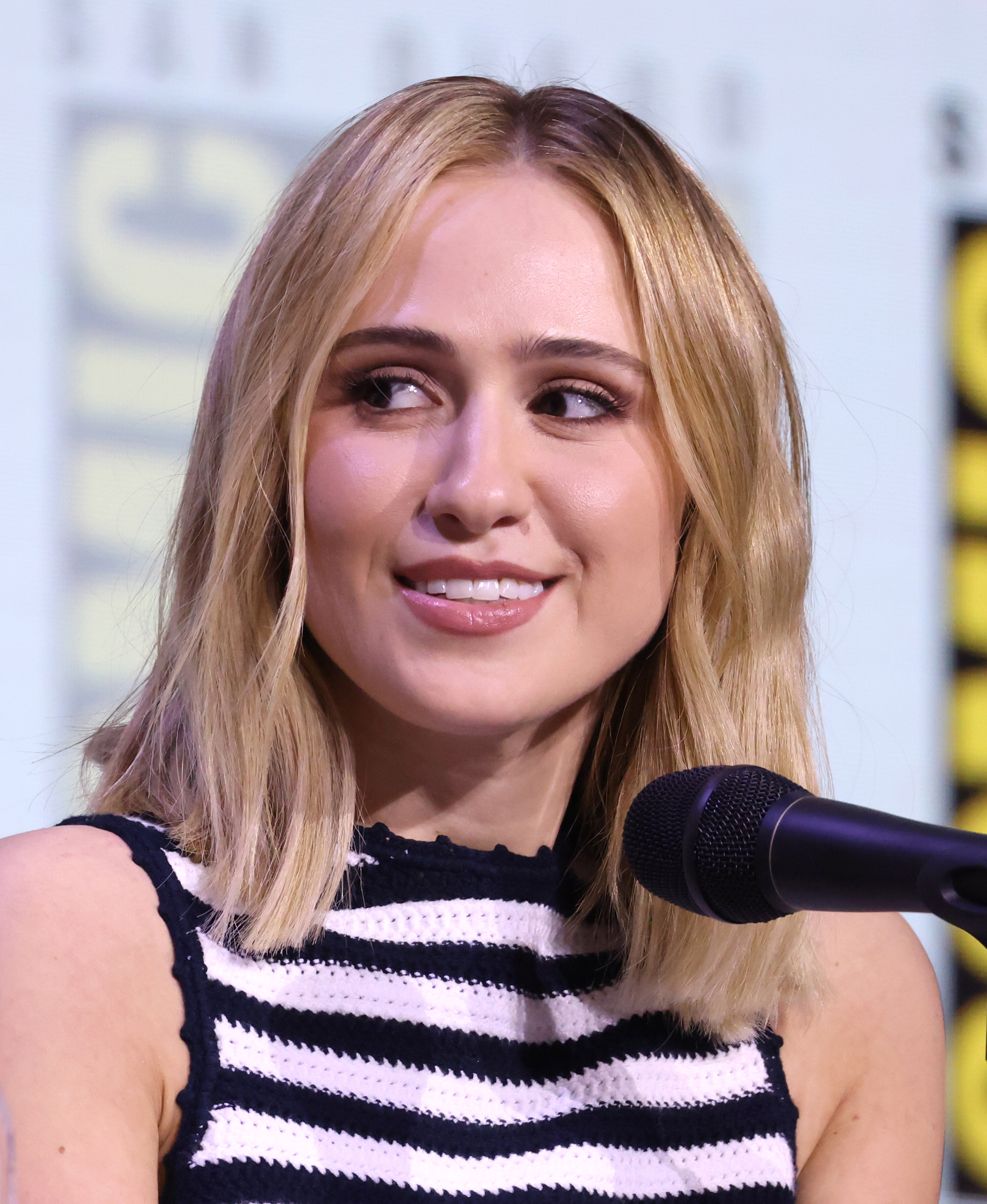
- Bakalova at the 2025 San Diego Comic-Con
- Born: Maria Valcheva Bakalova; 4 June 1996 (age 30); Burgas, Bulgaria
- Education: National Academy for Theatre and Film Arts (BA)
- Occupation: Actress
- Years active: 2017–present
- Awards: Full list

Maria Valcheva Bakalova (Note: /bəˈkɑːləvə/ bə-KAH-lə-və) (Note: Bulgarian: Мария Вълчева Бакалова, romanized: Marija Vǎlčeva Bakalova, IPA: [mɐˈrijɐ ˈvɤɫt͡ʃɛvɐ bɐˈkaɫovɐ]) (born 4 June 1996) is a Bulgarian actress. She is the recipient of various accolades, including a Critics' Choice Movie Award, in addition to nominations for an Academy Award, a BAFTA Award, an Actor Award, and a Golden Globe Award.

Born and raised in Burgas, Bakalova began her career in Bulgarian cinema while attending the National Academy for Theater and Film Arts. She mostly portrayed dramatic roles in films such as Transgression (2017), The Father (2019), Last Call (2020), and Women Do Cry (2021). She rose to prominence after starring in the 2020 mockumentary-film Borat Subsequent Moviefilm, which earned her the Critics' Choice Movie Award for Best Supporting Actress and a nomination for the Academy Award in the same category.

Bakalova has since had starring roles in films of various genres, including Bodies Bodies Bodies (2022) and The Apprentice (2024), portraying Ivana Trump in the latter. She also had voice roles, including in the Marvel Cinematic Universe film Guardians of the Galaxy Vol. 3 (2023) as Cosmo the Spacedog, the DC Universe series Creature Commandos (2024) and The Bad Guys 2 (2025).

== Life and career ==
=== 1996–2020: Early years and career beginnings ===
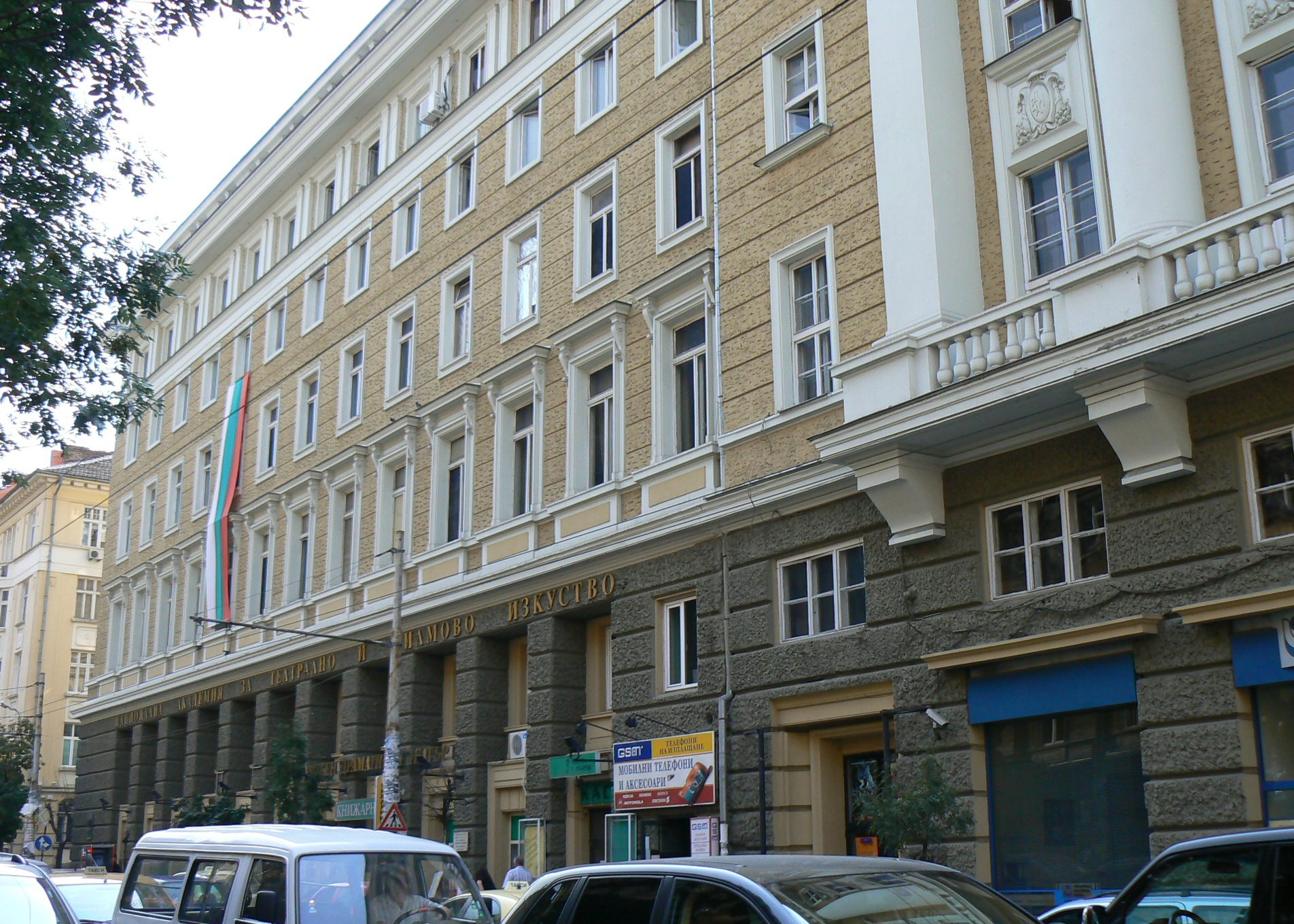
The National Academy for Theatre and Film Arts, where Bakalova studied acting

Maria Valcheva Bakalova was born on 4 June 1996 in Burgas to Rumyana Bakalova, a nurse, and Valcho Bakalov, a chemist. She began taking singing lessons and playing the flute around age six, and sang in a choir that toured across Europe. Bakalova enrolled in acting classes at the age of 12, majoring in drama theater and minoring in flute at the National School of Music and Stage Arts in Burgas, where she was a straight-A student; she recalled, "I was a super-disciplined child. I was reading too many books. I was obsessed with Dostoyevsky, at like 15, 16". As a teenager, Bakalova developed an interest in literature, especially the works of Gabriel García Márquez, Jorge Luis Borges and Mikhail Bulgakov, as a method of escapism. She was inspired to pursue film acting after watching The Hunt, and has cited filmmaker Thomas Vinterberg as her biggest influence alongside Susanne Bier, Pedro Almodóvar, Paolo Sorrentino and Andrea Arnold as other major influences.

Bakalova later moved to Sofia where she majored in drama at the National Academy for Theatre and Film Arts. As a student, she appeared in various stage productions, including Les Liaisons dangereuses, Sexual Perversity in Chicago, Kennedy's Children and The Trial. Bakalova made her on-screen debut playing a supporting part in the 2017 comedy-drama film XIIa. In the same year, she made her first headlining appearance in Transgression, where she played Yana, a young girl who has an unusual relationship with an aging rock musician. She secured the role after a classmate of hers signed her up for a blind audition during her first year at university. The film was screened at several film festivals in Europe and North America, before being released through HBO Max in 2021. In 2018, Bakalova won the award for Best Actress at Toronto's Alternative Film Festival for her performance.

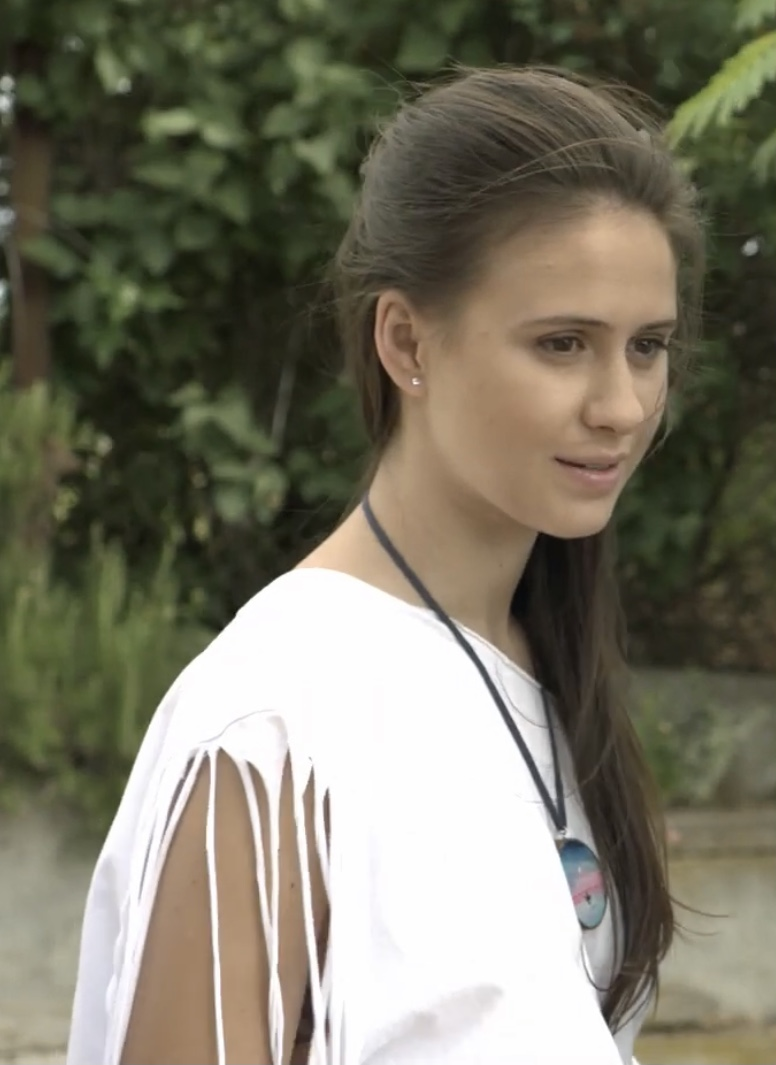
Bakalova on the set of Last Call in 2019

In her third year of studies, she volunteered to help filmmakers Kristina Grozeva and Petar Valchanov, who taught the only film acting class at the academy, with scheduling and other tasks, and traveled with them to the set of a film they were working on so that she could watch how they worked and learn from them. One of the directors invited her to audition for a bit part in their film The Father (2019); she landed the part and filmed a brief flashback scene as the young version of one of the characters. The Father won the Crystal Globe award for Best Film at the 54th Karlovy Vary International Film Festival, and was selected as the Bulgarian entry for the Best International Feature Film category at the 93rd Academy Awards.

Driven by her fascination with Danish cinema—particularly with the work of Vinterberg, Lars von Trier and their Dogme 95 movement—Bakalova used part of her university scholarship to take her parents on a trip to Denmark a few months before graduating. There, she visited Zentropa's headquarters, and asked if she could become a P.A. or a runner on von Trier's next film. She was sent away because she didn't speak Danish, prompting her to begin studying the language, before eventually graduating and moving to Los Angeles in 2019. Bakalova next starred in the 2020 comedy-drama Last Call as Alexandra, a suicidal girl who is on the verge of ending her life. Her performance was received positively by critics, and Yanko Terziev of Capital wrote that her portrayal of the character brought "warmth and lyricism" to the film.

=== 2020–present: Hollywood breakthrough ===
In 2020, Bakalova portrayed Tutar Sagdiyev, the daughter of fictional Kazakh reporter Borat Sagdiyev, in the mockumentary Borat Subsequent Moviefilm, alongside Sacha Baron Cohen. Although she was initially credited as Irina Nowak, reports later revealed her involvement. During the audition process, Bakalova had to travel to London for a callback; the secrecy around the project made her concerned that she might have become part of a human trafficking scheme. The film was lauded as "the most impactful piece of political entertainment" in the weeks leading up to the 2020 United States presidential election, as a scene in which Rudy Giuliani appears to put his hands down his trousers while reclining on a bed in the presence of Bakalova's character garnered significant media attention. Critics praised her performance, with some stating it was among the year's best. Matt Fowler of IGN noted that "the film's fantastic find, Maria Bakalova, every bit Sacha Baron Cohen's on-screen equal, is who, and what, most people will be talking about." Los Angeles Times film critic Justin Chang described her performance as "terrific," praising her portrayal of her character's journey "with madcap energy and touching conviction." For her performance, Bakalova won the Critics' Choice Movie Award for Best Supporting Actress and was nominated for the Academy Award, BAFTA Award, and Actor Award in the same category. She was also nominated for Golden Globe Award for Best Actress in a Motion Picture – Musical or Comedy. She became the first Bulgarian actress to be nominated for these accolades.

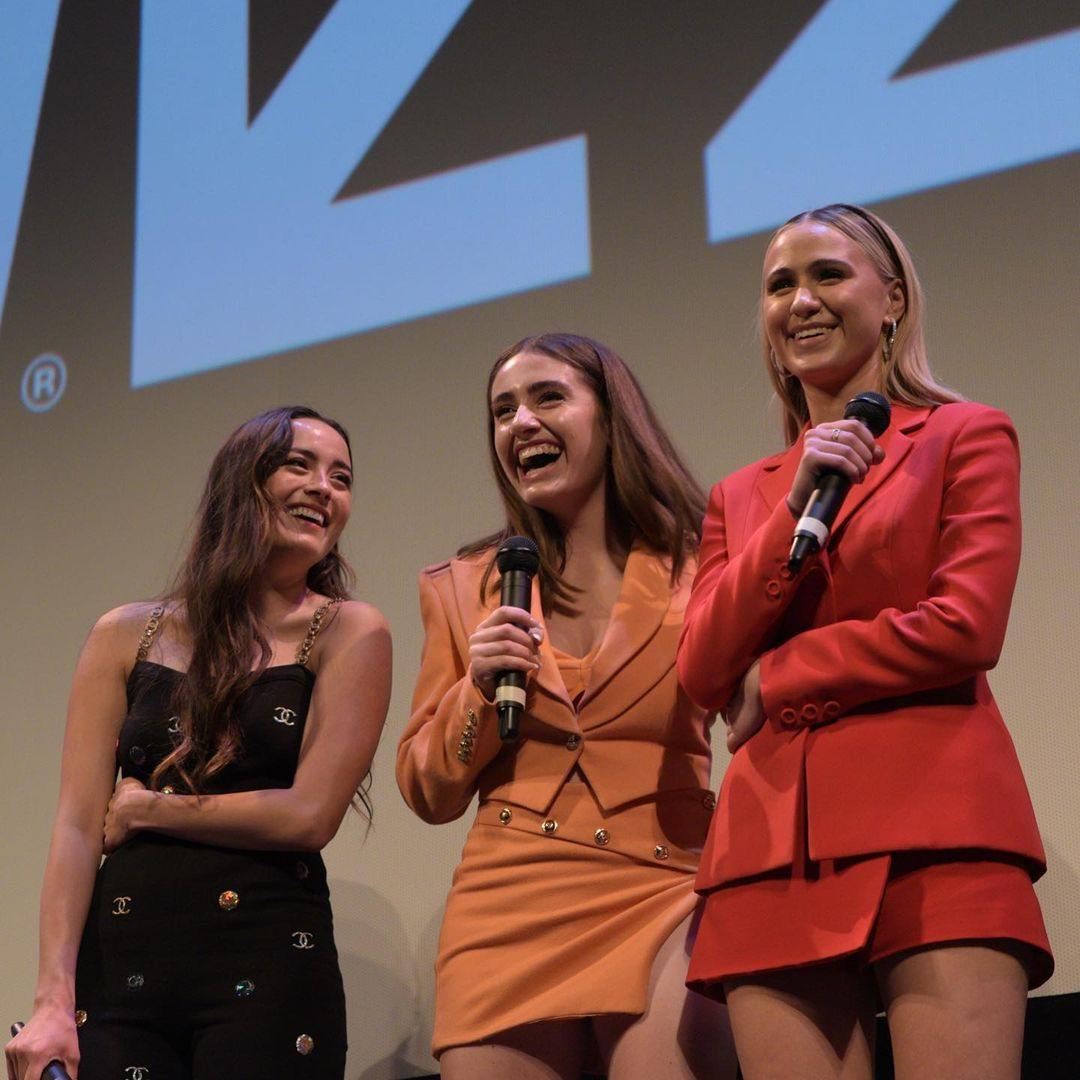
Bakalova with Chase Sui Wonders and Rachel Sennott at SXSW in 2022

Bakalova next starred as Sonja, a 19-year-old girl who discovers she is HIV-positive and is in denial about her need for treatment, in Women Do Cry (2021), directed by Mina Mileva and Vesela Kazakova. The film premiered to positive reviews from critics at the 2021 Cannes Film Festival, where it competed in the Un Certain Regard section, and received a Queer Palm nomination. The same year, Bakalova joined the Academy of Motion Picture Arts and Sciences as a member of the Actors Branch.

In 2022, she starred alongside Amandla Stenberg and Pete Davidson in A24's horror film Bodies Bodies Bodies. The film received predominantly favorable reviews; some felt that her comedic talents were wasted by playing a serious character. Her next role was in Judd Apatow's The Bubble (2022), part of an ensemble cast that included Karen Gillan, David Duchovny, Leslie Mann and Pedro Pascal. The film generated mostly negative reviews, and New York Times critic Ben Kenigsberg wrote that it "underused" Bakalova. After voicing Cosmo the Spacedog in The Guardians of the Galaxy Holiday Special (2022), she starred in the romantic comedy The Honeymoon (2022), which marked her first production venture. The film saw her play Sarah, whose honeymoon is ruined by her husband's troublesome best friend and who is pursued by the Italian gangster Giorgio, played by Lucas Bravo.

Bakalova next appeared in Andrew Durham's directorial debut Fairyland (2023), which premiered at the 2023 Sundance Film Festival. She reprised her role as Cosmo the Spacedog in the Marvel Cinematic Universe superhero film Guardians of the Galaxy Vol. 3 (2023), also providing the motion capture performance for the character. With box office takings of $845.6 million worldwide, Guardians of the Galaxy Vol. 3 was the fourth highest-grossing picture of the year, and became Bakalova's highest-grossing film.

Bakalova began 2024 by starring in Hala Matar's directorial debut Electra. After making a cameo appearance in Jerry Seinfeld's directorial debut Unfrosted (2024), Bakalova starred as Ivana Trump in The Apprentice (2024), directed by Ali Abbasi, which premiered at the 2024 Cannes Film Festival and competed for the Palme d'Or. She next reunited with The Father directors Kristina Grozeva and Petar Valchanov for the black comedy Triumph (2024), which she also produced. The film marked her return to Bulgarian cinema following her Hollywood breakthrough. It premiered at the 2024 Toronto International Film Festival and was selected as the Bulgarian entry for the Best International Feature Film category at the 97th Academy Awards.

In November 2022, Bakalova joined the cast of the action thriller film Dirty Angels, directed by Martin Campbell. She also starred in Madeleine Sackler's sci-fi comedy-drama O Horizon. In April 2024, she was cast in the Apple TV+ action adventure film Mayday.

== Public image ==
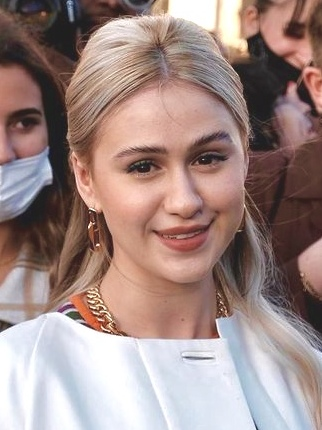
Bakalova at Paris Fashion Week in 2021

In 2020, Variety included Bakalova in their "10 Actors to Watch" list, while The New York Times named her as one of 2020's breakout stars. Since 2021, she has worked closely with Louis Vuitton's creative director Nicolas Ghesquière. In 2021, she appeared on two of Forbes magazine's annual 30 under 30 lists, which recognize the 30 most influential people in Europe under the age of 30. The same year, W featured her in their annual "Best Performances" issue, and Variety named her among the women who have made an impact on the global entertainment industry. Bakalova has topped Forbes Bulgaria's "Top 70 Bulgarian Celebrities" list twice.

Bakalova is an advocate for Bulgarian and Eastern European representation in Hollywood. She is the co-founder of the production company Five Oceans, which aims to bring Bulgarian, Balkan, and Slavic stories to international audiences, alongside Julian Kostov. At the 27th Critics' Choice Awards, Bakalova voiced her support for Ukraine, and called for "a new era of cultural and artistic exchange between Eastern Europe and Hollywood".

In 2021, Bakalova received an honorary Askeer Award as a rising international star and an ambassador of Bulgarian acting. Later that year, she was named an honorary citizen of her hometown, Burgas.

== Filmography ==
=== Film ===
Key
†	Denotes films that have not yet been released

Year	Title	Role	Notes
2017	XIIa	Milena	
2017	Transgression	Yana	
2019	The Father	Young Valentina	
2020	Last Call	Alexandra	
2020	Borat Subsequent Moviefilm	Tutar Sagdiyev	
2021	Women Do Cry	Sonja	
2022	Bodies Bodies Bodies	Bee	
2022	The Bubble	Anika	
2022	The Honeymoon	Sarah	Also producer
2023	Fairyland	Paulette	
2023	Guardians of the Galaxy Vol. 3	Cosmo the Spacedog (voice)	
2024	Electra	Francesca	
2024	Unfrosted	Rada Adzhubey	
2024	The Apprentice	Ivana Trump	
2024	Triumph	Slava Platnikova	Also producer
2024	Dirty Angels	The Bomb	
2025	O Horizon	Abby	
2025	The Bad Guys 2	Pigtail (voice)	Also voices character in Bulgarian dub
2025	What Stays After	Maggie	Short film
2026	All Night Wrong	Ell	
2026	Mayday	Anna Ustinov	
TBA	Override †	TBA	Post-production
TBA	No Way Off †	TBA	Filming

=== Television ===
Year	Title	Role	Notes	Ref.
2021	Borat's American Lockdown & Debunking Borat	Tutar Sagdiyev	Episode: "Borat's American Lockdown"	
2022	The Guardians of the Galaxy Holiday Special	Cosmo the Spacedog (voice)	Television special, first voice role	
2023	Marvel Studios: Assembled	Herself / Cosmo the Spacedog	Episode: "The Making of Guardians of the Galaxy Vol. 3"	
2024–2025	Creature Commandos	Princess Ilana Rostovic, Old Woman (voice)	Recurring role	

== Awards and nominations ==
Bakalova is the recipient of a Critics' Choice Movie Award for Best Supporting Actress for her performance in Borat Subsequent Moviefilm (2020). She has been nominated for Best Supporting Actress at the Academy Awards, BAFTA Awards, and Screen Actors Guild Awards, and for Best Actress in a Motion Picture Comedy or Musical at the Golden Globe Awards, also for her performance in Borat Subsequent Moviefilm (2020).

== See also ==
- List of Bulgarian actors
- List of Bulgarian Academy Award winners and nominees
- List of European Academy Award winners and nominees
- List of actors with Academy Award nominations
