= KAAA (disambiguation) =

KAAA is a radio station licensed to Kingman, Arizona, United States.

KAAA may also refer to:

- KAAA, ICAO code of Logan County Airport in Lincoln, Illinois, United States
- Kadoorie Agricultural Aid Association
- Karlsruhe Accurate Arithmetic Approach, an approach to high-accuracy computation in computer sciences
- Kenya Amateur Athletics Association

== See also ==
- Kaa (disambiguation)
