= Last Call (2020 film) =

2020 Bulgarian comedy-drama film by Ivaylo Penchev

- Theatrical release poster
- Directed by: Ivaylo Penchev
- Produced by: Ivaylo Penchev; Bashar Rahal; Stoyan Stoyanov
- Starring: Vasil Banov; Maria Bakalova; Phillip Avramov; Malin Krastev
- Cinematography: Georgi Chelebiev
- Edited by: Stefan Boyadzhiev
- Music by: George Strezov
- Production companies: Urban Media; CinemaQ
- Release dates: 22 August 2020 (Varna); 2 June 2021 (Bulgaria)
- Running time: 158 minutes
- Country: Bulgaria
- Language: Bulgarian
- Budget: €610,000

Last Call (Bulgarian: Като за последно) is a 2020 Bulgarian satirical black comedy drama film directed by Ivaylo Penchev. The film features an ensemble cast that includes Vasil Banov, Maria Bakalova, Phillip Avramov, Malin Krastev, Stefan Denolyubov, Kitodar Todorov, Yana Marinova and Lorina Kamburova.

== Plot ==
Alexandra is a 23-year-old girl who is suicidal. Nikola, a 70-year-old writer, is determined to kill himself by jumping from the Asparuhov Bridge. At the very last moment, he notices Alexandra on the verge of ending her life in the same way. The elderly man becomes obsessed with helping her find reasons to live and, in order to save her, he offers to marry her. His good intentions soon start to backfire when the tabloids get a hold of the story. A priest appears with his "re-educated" minions from the Sunday prison school along with an ex-naval captain in the company of giddy old men, sisters feuding over inheritance and a chubby grandchild.

== Cast ==
- Vasil Banov as Nikola Vladimirov
- Maria Bakalova as Alexandra
- Phillip Avramov as Father Boyan
- Malin Krastev as Zdravko
- Stefan Denolyubev as Ventsi
- Kitodar Todorov as Grigor
- Svezhen Mladenov as Kiril
- Gerasim Georgiev as Blagovest
- Anastasia Ingilizova as Ralitsa
- Milena Avramova as Kalina
- Anton Radichev as Valcho
- Lyuben Chatalov as Kunchev
- Stanimir Gamov as Director of Prison
- Yana Marinova as Nurse Ivanova
- Lorina Kamburova as the Bride

== Release ==
The film was originally set to be released in theatres in late 2020, but it was delayed due to the COVID-19 pandemic.

== Accolades ==
Award	Date of ceremony	Category	Recipient(s)	Result	Ref(s)
Love Is Folly International Film Festival	30 August 2020	Golden Aphrodite	Last Call	Nominated	
Golden Rose Film Festival	1 October 2020	Best Film	Last Call	Nominated	
Golden Rose Film Festival	1 October 2020	Audience Award	Last Call	Won	
