= The 11th Grade =

- Theatrical release poster
- Bulgarian: XIa
- Directed by: Georgi D. Kostov
- Written by: Nikolay Kolev
- Starring: Yana Marinova; Nikolai Sotirov; Bashar Rahal
- Cinematography: Emil Topuzov
- Edited by: Georgi D. Kostov; Julian Minkov
- Music by: Ventsislav Lalev; Svilen Nachev
- Production company: Korund X
- Distributed by: Nu Boyana Film Studios
- Release dates: 8 October 2015 (Golden Rose); 29 January 2016 (Bulgaria)
- Running time: 84 minutes
- Country: Bulgaria
- Language: Bulgarian
- Box office: 697.593 BGN

The 11th Grade (Bulgarian: XIa) is a 2015 Bulgarian comedy-drama film directed by Georgi D. Kostov (in his directorial debut) and written by Nikolay Kolev. Starring Yana Marinova, Nikolai Sotirov and Bashar Rahal.

== Synopsis ==
Lina is a former dancesport competitor who starts working as a literature teacher at an elite metropolitan high school. However, she will go to war with the upper class students, especially with Simona and Natalia, who go to school mainly for the pleasure of making life miserable for their poor teachers.

== Cast ==
The actors participating in this film are:

- Yana Marinova as Lina
- Nikolai Sotirov as Asen Petrov
- Bashar Rahal as Iván
- Ralitsa Paskaleva as Simona
- Boris Kashev as Biser
- Ioan Lov as Valery
- Veselin Troyanov as Ignat
- Boyka Velkova
- Stanislav Yanevski
- Daria Simeonova

== Release ==
It had its world premiere on 8 October 2015, at the Golden Rose Film Festival. It was commercially released on 29 January 2016, in Bulgarian theaters.

== Accolades ==
Year	Award	Category	Recipient	Result	Ref.
2016	Golden Rose Film Festival	Best Actress	Yana Marinova	Nominated	
2016	Golden Rose Film Festival	Best Sound	Svetlosar Georgiev	Won (Tied with "Losers")	

== Sequel ==
On September 15, 2017, a sequel titled XIIa was released, this time starring Radina Kardzhilova.
