= XIIa =

2017 comedy-drama film by Magdalena Ralcheva

- Promotional release poster
- Directed by: Magdalena Ralcheva
- Written by: Nikolay Kolev
- Produced by: David Varod; Tatyana von Pedersen; Aleksandar Zdravkov
- Starring: Radina Kardzhilova; Darin Angelov
- Cinematography: Emil Topuzov
- Edited by: Victoria Radoslavova
- Music by: Dimitar Tashkov
- Production companies: Pink and Ginger; XIIa
- Distributed by: A Plus Films
- Release dates: 20 May 2017 (Cannes); 15 September 2017 (Bulgaria)
- Running time: 93 minutes
- Country: Bulgaria
- Language: Bulgarian
- Box office: $266,664

XIIa is a 2017 Bulgarian comedy-drama film directed by Magdalena Ralcheva and written by Nikolay Kolev. Starring Radina Kardzhilova and Darin Angelov, it is the sequel to the 2015 film XIa.

== Synopsis ==
Lina returns to school after a one-year break to teach literature to a class full of headstrong teenagers. At home, the situation is no better. Lina separates from her cheating husband and is constantly bullied by her domineering mother, and her son is mistreated by his classmates. At times, the tension reaches extreme limits and Lina is on the verge of collapsing.

== Cast ==
- Radina Kardzhilova as Lina
- Darin Angelov as the Sports teacher
- Maria Kavardzhikova as Lina's mother
- Aneliya Mangarova as Megan
- Kal Minev as Psyco
- Deyan Georgiev as Valeri
- Vasilena Atanasova as Dara
- Maria Bakalova as Milena
- Elena Boycheva as the Headmaster

== Production ==
Nikolay Kolev wrote the screenplay as a sequel to XIa. Producer David Varod assembled a new ensemble cast different from the one featured in XIa and sought out a new school location for filming.

Principal photography began on 21 October 2016 in Sofia, and lasted 20 days.

== Release ==
The film had its world premiere on 20 May 2017 at the 70th Cannes International Film Festival. It was commercially released on 15 September 2017 in Bulgarian theaters.
