= Lorina Kamburova =

Bulgarian actress (1991–2021)

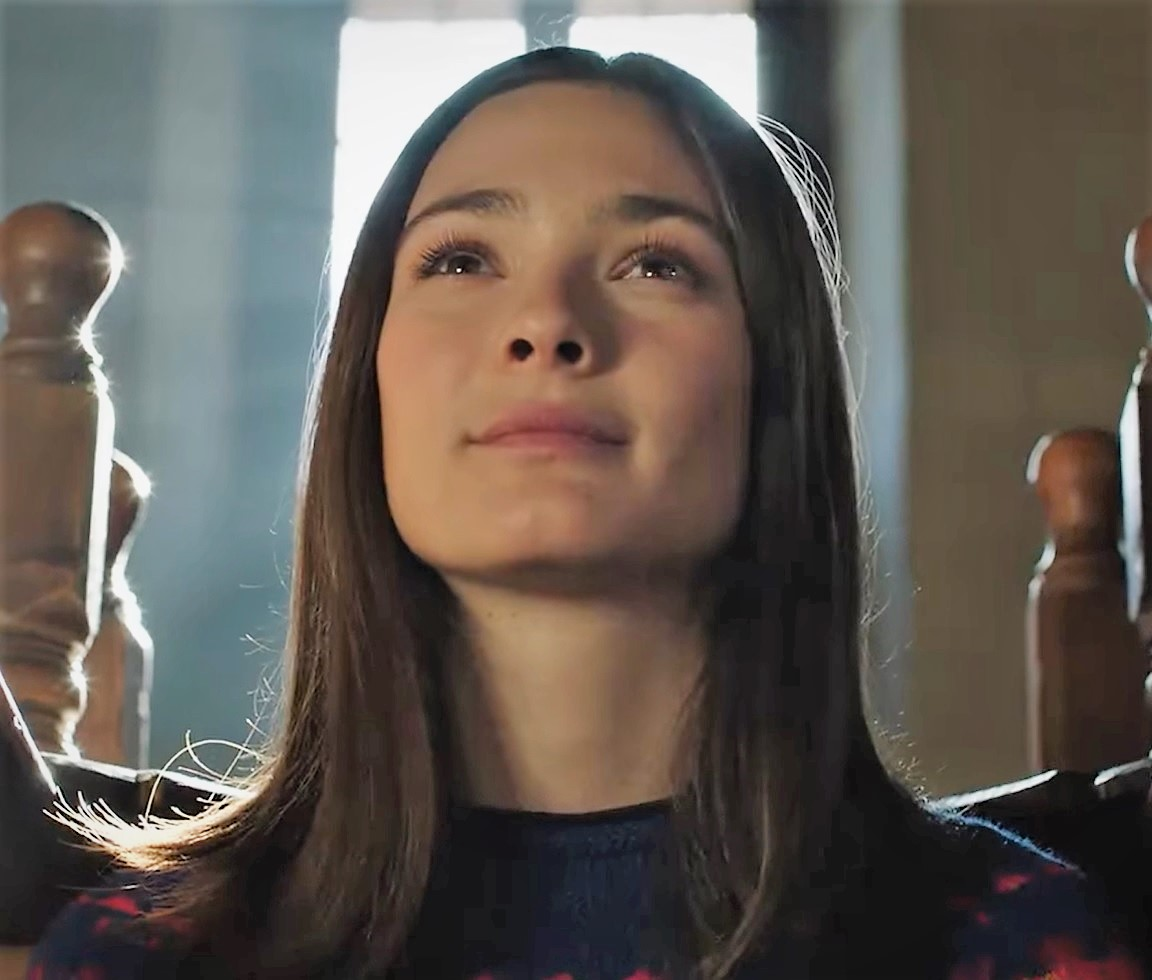
- Kamburova in 2018
- Born: 25 October 1991; Varna, Bulgaria
- Died: 27 May 2021 (aged 29); Moscow, Russia
- Occupation: Actress
- Years active: 2011–2021
- Partner: Awi Rabelista Nijhof

Lorina Kamburova (Bulgarian: Лорина Камбурова; 25 October 1991 – 27 May 2021) was a Bulgarian actress.

== Biography ==
In 2014, Kamburova graduated from the National Academy for Theatre and Film Arts in Sofia. She later played in among others Nightworld, Leatherface, Doom: Annihilation.

== Death ==
Kamburova died in Moscow on 27 May 2021, at the age of 29, in her sleep. She needed a lung transplant and was planning one at a hospital in Vienna. Lorina recovered from bilateral pneumonia and COVID-19, but developed further post COVID-19 complications. Her funeral took place on 6 June 2021, in her birth place Varna. However, her memorial place is at Cape Kaliakra in Bulgaria.

== Filmography ==
Film roles
Year	Title	Role	Notes
2011	Hello, Love, Goodbye	Lora	Short film
2017	Nightworld	Zara	
2017	Leatherface	Betty Hartman	
2018	Day of the Dead: Bloodline	Abby	
2018	Crystal Inferno	Adria	Also known as Inferno: Skyscraper Escape
2018	Death Race: Beyond Anarchy	Nazi Girl	Direct-to-video
2019	I Know What You Did	Receptionist	Short film
2019	Doom: Annihilation	Dr. Sandy Peterson	Direct-to-video
2020	Last Call	The Bride	
2021	Loveness and Monsters	Boyana	
2021	Enslaved	Elena	Short film
2021	The Giaour	Dancing Girl	

Television roles
Year	Title	Role	Notes
2015–2016	Ties	Lea / Liya	
2015–2016	Total Drama Presents: The Ridonculous Race	Emma, Kitty	Bulgarian dub
2018	Dear Heirs	Ana	
2020	The young and the strong survive	Sergeant Collins	TV Mini-Series
