= Andrew Gower =

English actor

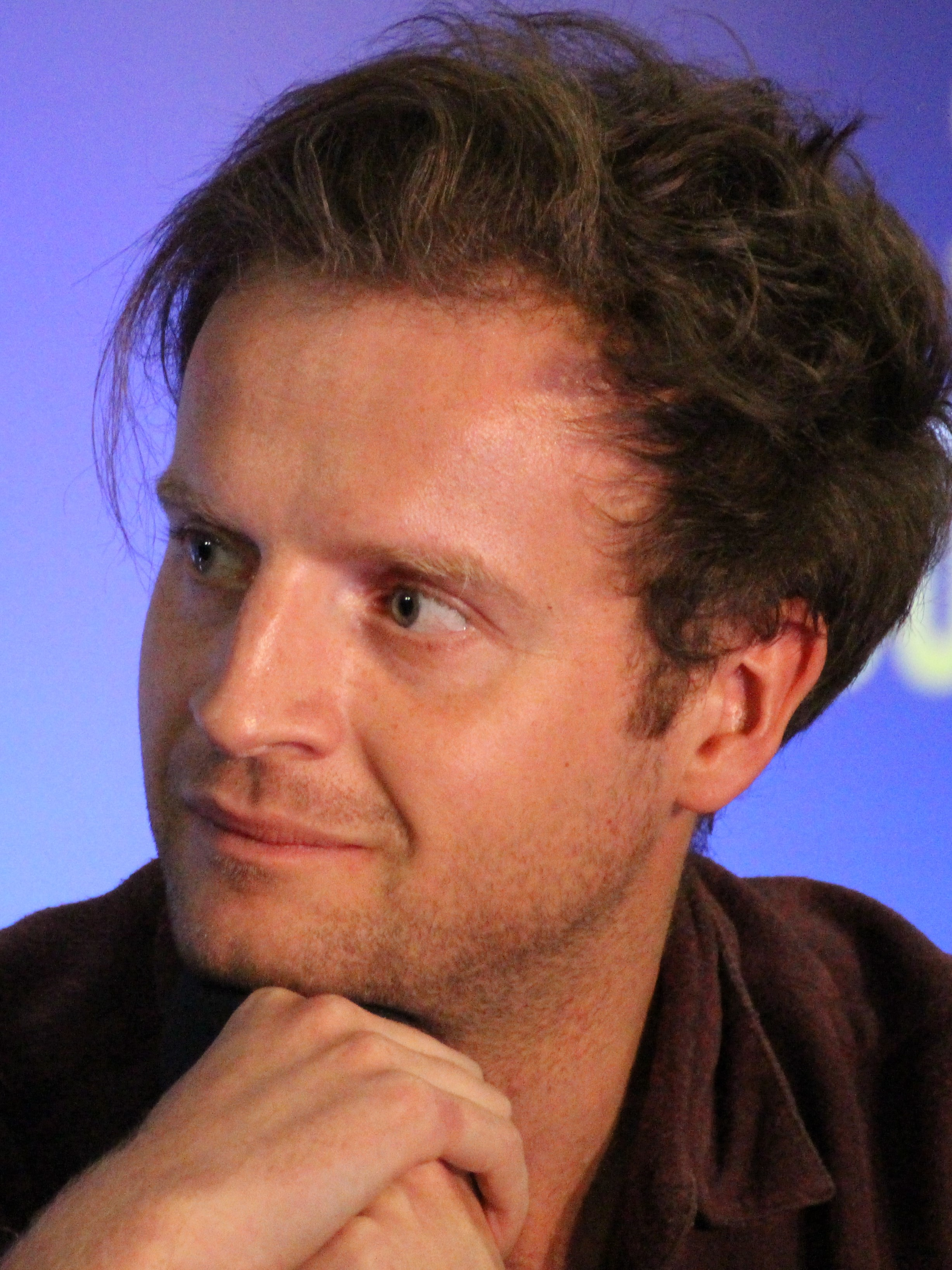
- Gower in 2018
- Born: 8 November 1988 (age 37); Aintree, Merseyside, England
- Occupation: Actor
- Years active: 2010–present

Andrew Gower (born 8 November 1989) is an English actor. He is best known for his recurring role as Cutler in Being Human and his turn as Prince Charles Stuart in Outlander. Gower won the Spotlight Prize for Best Actor in 2010.

== Life and career ==
Gower was born in Aintree, Merseyside, near Liverpool in North West England. His early schooling included Davenhill Primary School in Aintree and Great Sankey High School in Warrington, Cheshire. It was during Year Nine of his studies that Gower began acting, appearing in school plays and musical productions. He enrolled in Barrow Hall College, Great Sankey High School's sixth form college, in 2007, while studying for his A levels, he joined a local amateur drama group. Gower, an Oxford School of Drama graduate, was awarded the prestigious Spotlight Prize for Best Actor in July 2010.

In March 2011, Gower made his debut in British television on the ITV's medical drama Monroe, in the role of Dr Andrew Mullery, a heart surgeon in training. To research the role, Gower watched two coronary artery bypass surgeries while standing next to actual surgeons. Gower appeared in both series, reprising his role as the newly promoted General Registrar, under Head of Clinical Services Alistair Gillespie (Neil Pearson), in the second series.

That same year, Gower appeared in the television broadcast of the musical Frankenstein's Wedding... Live in Leeds, a modern adaptation of Mary Shelley's gothic novel Frankenstein. Instead of being pre-recorded as a traditional television musical, it was broadcast live, with an audience of 12,000 in attendance at Kirkstall Abbey, on BBC Three.

In 2012, Gower joined the cast of BBC Three's Being Human, as vampire solicitor Nick Cutler, in series 4 of the hit television series. Filming for the series began in Barry, Wales in late July 2011 and was broadcast in 2012. Gower was the recipient of critical praise for his work on the series. This year also saw a guest role in series 4 of E4's science-fiction comedy Misfits and a run as Seiffert in Manfred Karge's surreal play The Conquest of the South Pole at the Arcola Theatre. In his first radio performance, Gower played Lupin in the BBC Radio 4's comedy Diary of a Nobody, adapted by Andrew Lynch from George and Weedon Grossmith's Victorian novel.

Gower returned to episodic television in 2013. He appeared as Sherlock Holmes in series 6 of CBC's Victorian drama Murdoch Mysteries and would later reprise his role in series 7. After a cameo in Showtime's The Borgias, Gower appeared as Lord Strange in several episodes of the BBC's mini-series The White Queen.

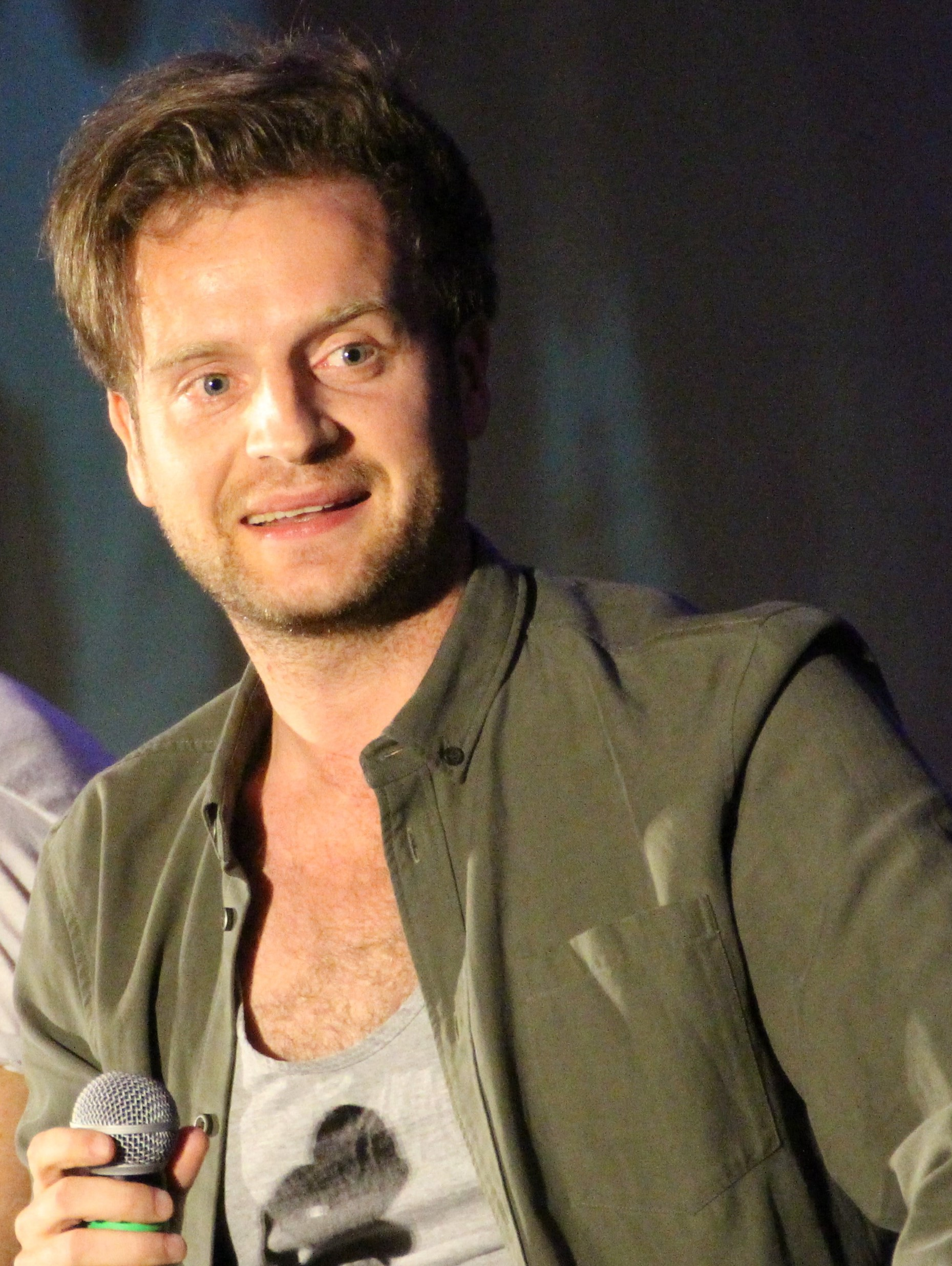
Andrew Gower at Creation Entertainment's Outlander convention in Las Vegas (NV) on 14 July 2018.

In 2014, Gower was featured in Jon Stewart's film directorial debut, Rosewater, as Jimmy the Avid Editor. That same year, he appeared in series 2 of the BBC's drama The Village as Gilbert Hankin and in series 2 of ITV's crime drama Endeavour as Nicholas Myers.

The next year (2015) Gower was cast in the role of Caligula in NBC's drama A.D. The Bible Continues and he played Mark, an ambitious young banker, in the Emmy awarded three-part BBC series Capital, based on John Lanchester's novel of the same name later that year.

In 2016, Gower made his West End debut as Winston Smith in a theatrical adaptation of George Orwell's 1984, a dystopian look at life today, at the Playhouse Theatre in London. He also appeared as Prince Charles Stuart in series 2 and 3 of the Starz historical dramatic series Outlander, based upon Diana Gabaldon's best-selling book series.

Returning to the dystopian roots he explored in 1984, Gower played Rob in series four of the award-winning Netflix drama Black Mirror. The episode, entitled "Crocodile", was helmed by Australian director John Hillcoat and centres on the idea of a device that can access personal memories.

It was announced in December 2017 that Gower will portray Ezra Spurnrose, the young heir of a wealthy family, in Amazon's eight-episode fantasy-noir drama Carnival Row. The series from executive producers Travis Beacham and Rene Echevarria was released on Amazon Prime on 30 August 2019. Ahead of its premiere, the series was renewed for a second season by Amazon Prime in July 2019. Andrew Gower is set to reprise his role as Ezra Spurnrose.

In 2019, Gower re-visited 19th century crime solving as he joined the cast of the period drama Miss Scarlet and The Duke which follows Eliza Scarlet (played by British actress Kate Phillips), the first female detective in the Victorian era.

In 2020, he played a cancer survivor in Running Naked, a film written and directed by Victor Buhler.

Also in 2020, Gower finished his first short film Humpty Fu*king Dumpty as an executive producer, an in-depth look at Merseybeat musician Tommy Quickly (played by Gower), which was written and directed by Stephen Walters. The project was funded through Kickstarter, a widely used crowdfunding platform. The film was released on 8 May 2020 on the official website HumptyFilm.com.

In 2024, Gower made his debut playing DS Chet Harper in the Channel 5 and Acorn TV drama series Ellis alongside Sharon D Clarke.

=== Music career ===
In June 2005, Andrew Gower formed the Manchester-based rock band Emerson with his friends Michael Collins and James Webster. Gower acted as the band's lead vocalist, Collins as keyboard and Webster as guitar player. From the beginning they wrote their own songs inspired by their favourite artists. In 2006, Todd Ryan (drums) and Alasdair Ramsey (bass) joined the band. They played gigs in North West England, several times at The Cavern Club (the Liverpool club where The Beatles were discovered). When Gower left to attend the Oxford School of Drama the following year, he had to put his music career on hold, with every intention on getting the band back together at a later point. However, this never happened and Emerson eventually dissolved.

In 2015, Andrew Gower became involved in the music project The Gustaffsons who have recorded four of their songs (cover songs and original materials) and published them on SoundCloud. He's also worked on original songs for the short film Humpty Fu*king Dumpty together with Stephen Walters.

Gower is a self-described "obsessed" Beatles fan.

== Filmography ==
Year(s)	Title	Role	Network	Notes
2011	Frankenstein's Wedding... Live in Leeds	Victor Frankenstein	BBC Three	
2011–2012	Monroe	Andrew Mullery	ITV	Series regular
2012	Being Human	Cutler	BBC Three	7 episodes
2012	Misfits	Jake	E4	Episode: "4.4"
2013	Murdoch Mysteries	David Kingsley / Sherlock Holmes	CBC	2 episodes
2013	The Borgias	Assassin	Showtime	Episode: "The Face of Death"
2013	The White Queen	Lord Strange	BBC One	2 episodes
2013	Out of Darkness	Male	Mango Films	short film
2014	Rosewater	Jimmy	Scott Rudin Productions	
2014	The Village	Gilbert Hankin	BBC One	Series regular (series 2)
2014	Endeavour	Nicholas Myers	ITV	Episode: "Neverland"
2015	A.D. The Bible Continues	Caligula	NBC	3 episodes
2015	Black Work	DC Jared Ansell	ITV	2 episodes
2015	Capital	Mark	BBC One	2 episodes
2016	The Tall Tales of Urchin	Mudlark	Nickelodeon Animated Shorts Program	voice
2017	Blessed Are They That Fear the Lord	James O'Harry		short film
2017	Black Mirror	Rob	Netflix	Episode: "Crocodile"
2018	Midsomer Murders	Harry Ferabbee	ITV	Episode: "Send in the Clowns"
2019	Poldark	James Hadfield	BBC One	2 episodes
2020	Miss Scarlet and The Duke	Rupert Parker	A+E Networks	Series regular
2020	Humpty Fu*king Dumpty	Tommy Quickly	Jane & Joan Films	short film
2020	Running Naked	Ben Taylor	North of Watford Films	
2016–2022	Outlander	Prince Charles Stuart	STARZ	11 episodes
2019-2023	Carnival Row	Ezra Spurnrose	Amazon Video	Recurring role
2023	You	Detective Peter Andrews	Netflix	3 episodes
2024	Ellis	DS Chet Harper	Channel 5	3 episodes
TBA	No Way Off	TBA	Filming	

== Radio ==
Year(s)	Title	Role	Network
2021	The Giant Pacific Octopus Maritime School	Guy	45 North
2019	Tracks: Indigo	Luke	BBC Radio 4
2018	Dark Visions: Speak	Lucien	BBC Radio 4
2012	Diary of a Nobody	Lupin	BBC Radio 4

== Theatre ==
Year	Title	Role	Director	Theatre
2016	1984	Winston Smith	Robert Icke & Duncan Macmillan	Playhouse Theatre
2012	The Conquest of the South Pole	Seiffert	Stephen Unwin	Arcola Theatre
2010	Terror Tales – You can do It & In for the Kill	Charlie/Jamie	Vicky Jones	Hampstead Theatre
2010	First Time Voters		Vicky Jones & Phoebe Waller-Bridge	Bush Theatre
2010	After the Fall	Dan	George Peck	Oxford School of Drama
2009	The Country Wife	Sparkish	David Straun	Oxford School of Drama
2009	Mother in Law	Pamphilus	Steve Woodward	Oxford School of Drama
2009	As You Like	Adam	Charlie Westenra	
2008	Time and the Conways	Gerald Thornton	Steve Woodward	Oxford School of Drama
2008	Enemies	Sinstov	Naomi Jones	Oxford School of Drama
