= Frankenstein's Wedding =

- Genre: Drama; Horror; Musical
- Written by: Chloe Moss
- Directed by: Colin Teague
- Starring: Lacey Turner; Andrew Gower; David Harewood
- Country of origin: United Kingdom

Production
- Executive producers: Meredith Chambers; Richard Fell; Eleanor Moran
- Producer: Tony Followell
- Running time: 85 mins

Original release
- Network: BBC Three
- Release: 19 March – 21 March 2011

Frankenstein's Wedding (also known as Frankenstein's Wedding... Live in Leeds) is a live musical drama based on Mary Shelley's 1818 novel Frankenstein; or, The Modern Prometheus. The show was broadcast live on BBC Three on 19 March 2011 from Kirkstall Abbey.

== Summary ==
The show followed the same story line as Shelley's novel, however it was based mostly around the night of Victor Frankenstein's wedding. An audience of 12,000 watch from Kirkstall Abbey as Victor and Elizabeth Lavenza get married. Throughout the event scenes which had been filmed prior were shown, mainly focusing on Frankenstein's monster. There were moments in which the cast sang well known songs, including Andrew Gower performing the song "Wires" by Athlete.

== Cast ==
- Lacey Turner as Elizabeth 'Liz' Lavenza
- Andrew Gower as Victor Frankenstein
- David Harewood as The Creature
- Mark Williams as Alphonse Frankenstein
- Jemima Rooper as Justine Mortiz
- Andrew Knott as Henry
- Pearce Quigley as Uncle Alfred "Fred" Frankenstein
- Gary Carr as Giles
- Michael Higgs as a Detective
- Anthony Lewis as a Policeman

== Reception ==
The drama was nominated for the "Sport & Live Event award" at the 2012 British Academy Television Awards. and "Nations and Regions Programme award" at the Royal Television Society Programme awards,

The production won three awards for the "Sport or Event Coverage", "Professional Excellence: Vision & Audio", and "Music or Use of Music" at the regional RTS Yorkshire awards.
