= No Way Off =

British thriller film

- Directed by: Brian Kelly
- Screenplay by: Gaby Hull
- Produced by: Matthew James Wilkinson
- Starring: Maria Bakalova; David Wilmot; Andrew Gower
- Production company: Stigma Films
- Country: United Kingdom
- Language: English

No Way Off is an upcoming British thriller film starring Maria Bakalova, David Wilmot, and Andrew Gower.

== Premise ==
The film is a single location suspense thriller on a bus on Christmas Eve as a single mother and her baby wake up the only occupants on a bus driven by a man in a mask.

== Cast ==
- Maria Bakalova
- David Wilmot
- Andrew Gower

== Production ==
The film is written by Gaby Hull, and directed by Brian Kelly, with Matthew James Wilkinson producing for Stigma Films.

The cast is led by Maria Bakalova and David Wilmot and Andrew Gower.

Filming took place in Northern Ireland, with first-look images from production released in February 2026.
