= Override (upcoming film) =

- Directed by: Jordan Downey
- Written by: Jordan Downey; Jackson Murray; Kevin Stewart
- Produced by: James Harris; Michael Downey
- Starring: Frank Grillo; Maria Bakalova
- Production companies: Tea Shop Productions; Capstone Pictures
- Country: United States
- Language: English

Override is an upcoming American science fiction survival thriller film written and directed by Jordan Downey. It stars Frank Grillo and Maria Bakalova.

== Premise ==
A futuristic soldier is left for dead, but with the help of a synthetic angel, she must fight against the clock to survive a mortal wound.

== Cast ==
- Frank Grillo
- Maria Bakalova

== Production ==
In November 2025, principal photography was underway in Belfast, when it was announced that Frank Grillo and Maria Bakalova would star in a science fiction survival thriller film written and directed by Jordan Downey.
