= Borat Subsequent Moviefilm =

2020 mockumentary film by Jason Woliner

Borat Subsequent Moviefilm: Delivery of Prodigious Bribe to American Regime for Make Benefit Once Glorious Nation of Kazakhstan
- Promotional release poster
- Directed by: Jason Woliner
- Screenplay by: Sacha Baron Cohen; Anthony Hines; Dan Swimer; Peter Baynham; Erica Rivinoja; Dan Mazer; Jena Friedman; Lee Kern
- Story by: Sacha Baron Cohen; Anthony Hines; Dan Swimer; Nina Pedrad
- Based on: Borat Sagdiyev by Sacha Baron Cohen
- Produced by: Sacha Baron Cohen; Monica Levinson; Anthony Hines
- Starring: Sacha Baron Cohen; Maria Bakalova
- Cinematography: Luke Geissbühler
- Edited by: James Thomas; Craig Alpert; Michael Giambra
- Music by: Erran Baron Cohen
- Production company: Four by Two Films
- Distributed by: Amazon Studios
- Release date: October 23, 2020
- Running time: 96 minutes
- Countries: United States; United Kingdom
- Language: English (Note: Although the primary language is English, Hebrew, Bulgarian, and Romanian are spoken. Credits and titles are written in Russian and Kazakh.)
- Budget: $10–20 million

Borat Subsequent Moviefilm: Delivery of Prodigious Bribe to American Regime for Make Benefit Once Glorious Nation of Kazakhstan, (Note: Initially titled onscreen as Borat Gift of Sexy Monkey to Vice Premier Mikhael Pence for Make Benefit Recently Diminished Nation of Kazakhstan, and later as Borat Gift of Daughter to Mikhael Pence for Make Benefit Diminished Nation of Kazakhstan and finally as Borat Delivery of Sexy Gift to Rudy Giuliani in Last-Ditch Attempt to Save Borat from Execution and Make Benefit Diminished Nation of Kazakhstan, as the titular character's plans change. The official full title is shown during the end credits.) or simply Borat Subsequent Moviefilm or Borat 2, is a 2020 mockumentary black comedy film co-written by and starring Sacha Baron Cohen as the fictional Kazakh journalist and television personality Borat Sagdiyev, and Maria Bakalova as his daughter Tutar, who is to be offered as a bride to then–U.S. vice president Mike Pence during the COVID-19 pandemic and the 2020 presidential election. It is a sequel to 2006's Borat! Cultural Learnings of America for Make Benefit Glorious Nation of Kazakhstan.

Although Baron Cohen had said in 2007 that he had retired the Borat character, he was spotted in 2019 in the disguise, and was seen filming in mid-2020, leading to speculation of a second Borat film. The project was officially announced in September 2020, with Amazon Studios acquiring the distribution rights. Borat Subsequent Moviefilm was released on October 23, 2020, on Amazon Prime Video. It received praise from critics for Baron Cohen's and Bakalova's performances, as well as for its commentary on American culture; former New York City mayor Rudy Giuliani's appearance, however, was polarizing.

The film received three nominations at the 78th Golden Globe Awards, winning Best Actor in a Motion Picture – Musical or Comedy (Baron Cohen) and Best Motion Picture—Musical or Comedy. At the 93rd Academy Awards, it was nominated for Best Adapted Screenplay and Best Supporting Actress (Bakalova, who became the first Bulgarian actress to be nominated for an Oscar). In addition, Bakalova received BAFTA and Actor Award nominations as Best Supporting Actress and was nominated for Golden Globe Award for Best Actress in a Motion Picture – Musical or Comedy. The screenplay won the award for Best Adapted Screenplay at the 73rd Writers Guild of America Awards.

Borat Subsequent Moviefilm holds the Guinness World Record for the longest title of an Oscar–nominated film.

== Plot ==
After 14 years of forced labor in a gulag for the dishonor inflicted on his country in his previous adventure, Kazakh journalist Borat Sagdiyev is released by his country's president, Nursultan Nazarbayev, with a mission to deliver Kazakh Minister of Culture (and Kazakhstan's most famous porn actor) Johnny the Monkey to President Donald Trump in an attempt to redeem the nation. Unable to get close to Trump after defecating in the landscaping of Trump International Hotel and Tower in the previous film, Borat opts to give the monkey to Vice President Mike Pence. Before leaving, he discovers that his arch-nemesis neighbor, Nursultan Tulyakbay, has stolen his family and home and that he has a 15-year-old daughter, Tutar, who lives in his barn.

Borat is transported across the world in a circuitous route by cargo ship and arrives in Galveston, Texas, where he finds he is a celebrity. Wanting to maintain a low profile, Borat purchases multiple disguises. He buys a cell phone and welcomes Johnny but finds that Tutar is in Johnny's shipping crate and has eaten him. Horrified, Borat faxes Nazarbayev, who tells him to find a way to satisfy Pence or he will be executed. Borat decides to give Tutar to Pence.

Tutar receives a makeover, and Borat introduces her at a debutante ball. Her menstrual blood is prominently displayed at the ball during a father and daughter dance. Discovering that Pence is nearby at CPAC, Borat disguises himself as Trump and attempts to give Tutar there, but security ejects him. Nazarbayev is enraged and tells him to return to Kazakhstan for execution. Realizing that he can still give Tutar to someone close to Trump, Tutar suggests giving her to Rudy Giuliani.

Because Giuliani had bragged about having an affair with a large-breasted woman, Borat brings Tutar to a cosmetic surgeon who advises breast implants. While Borat works in a barbershop to raise enough money to pay for breast surgery, he briefly leaves Tutar with a babysitter who is confused by Borat's sexist teachings. She informs Tutar that the things her culture has taught her are lies. After Tutar sees a woman driving a car and successfully masturbates for the first time, she decides not to get the surgery and lashes out at Borat for keeping her oppressed her whole life. Before leaving, she tells him that the Holocaust, their country’s "greatest accomplishment," is a lie by citing a Holocaust denial Facebook page.

Shaken, Borat decides to commit suicide by going to the nearest synagogue dressed as his version of a stereotypical Jew and waiting for the next mass shooting but is shocked to find Holocaust survivors there who treat him with kindness and to his anti-Semitic delight, reassure him that the Holocaust happened. Overjoyed, Borat looks for Tutar but finds the streets deserted due to the COVID-19 pandemic. He quarantines with two QAnon conspiracy theorists who offer to help him reunite with Tutar. They find Tutar online, who has become a reporter and will be covering a March for Our Rights rally in Olympia, Washington.

At the rally, the men appeal to Tutar, telling her that her dad will be killed unless she helps. She accepts and arranges an interview to seduce Giuliani without her father's participation. Borat talks with her babysitter and has a change of heart, realizing that he loves Tutar. After the interview, Giuliani and Tutar proceed to a bedroom before Borat intervenes and tries to offer sexual favors to Giuliani personally. Borat decides to face execution in Kazakhstan, and Tutar promises to go with him.

Borat is shocked to find he will not be executed as he had instead been used as retaliation by Nazarbayev for making Kazakhstan a laughingstock. Before departing for the United States, Kazakhstan officials infected Borat with SARS-CoV-2 via an injection of "gypsy tears," making him patient zero of the COVID-19 pandemic. As he was sent around the world, he continued to spread the virus. Borat uses a recording made near the beginning of his trip to convince Nazarbayev that his admission has been recorded and sent to Brian, the man who sold Borat his phone and who Borat claims is America's Minister of Technology.

Borat and Tutar blackmail Nazarbayev into giving him his job back and changing Kazakhstan's misogynistic laws. Three months later, Tutar and Borat are a reporting team, and Kazakhstan has a new tradition to replace the nation's antisemitic ones: the Running of the American. It features exaggerated caricatures of Trump supporters and "Karens" pretending to spread COVID-19 and killing an effigy of Anthony Fauci. The film ends with a message encouraging viewers to vote in the then-upcoming presidential election.

== Cast ==
- Sacha Baron Cohen as Borat Margaret Sagdiyev, a Kazakh news reporter who has achieved international fame and notoriety after the release of his "documentary", and who has been imprisoned in Kazakhstan for the past 14 years for being perceived to have brought shame to the country.
- Maria Bakalova as Tutar Sagdiyev, Borat's teenage daughter. Bakalova was initially credited as Irina Nowak but later reports revealed Bakalova's involvement.
- Dani Popescu as Premier Nursultan Nazarbayev, a fictionalized version of Kazakhstan's leader of the same name.
- Tom Hanks as himself
- Manuel Vieru as Dr. Yamak, who injеcts Borat with COVID-19, making him patient zero in the pandemic
- Miroslav Tolj as Nursultan Tulyakbay, Borat's hated neighbor who steals his family and property while Borat is in prison
- Alin Popa as Hueylewis / Jeffrey Epstein Sagdiyev, Borat's son. Popa replaced Stonie from the first film.
- Ion Gheorghe as Bilak Sagdiyev, Borat's son
- Nicolae Gheorghe as Biram Sagdiyev, Borat's son
- Marcela Codrea as a Kuczek villager
- Luca Nelu as a Kuczek villager
- Nicoleta Ciobanu as Babuska
- Rita Wilson as herself
- Jason Woliner as a bystander in Australia

Mike Pence and Rudy Giuliani appear as themselves. Bystanders included in the film include salesman Brian Patrick Snyder, Instagram influencer and entertainer Macy Chanel, crisis pregnancy center owner Pastor Jonathan Bright, debutante coach Dr. Jean Sheffield, Dallas-based plastic surgeon and naval reservist Charles Wallace, professional babysitter Jeanise Jones, Wooten's Barbershop (Eatonton, Georgia) patron Alan "Randy" Knight, the Hillsboro Republican Women's Club, QAnon conspiracy theorists Jerry Holleman and Jim Russell, and Holocaust survivor Judith Dim Evans. The character of Johnny the Monkey—a porn star and Kazakhstani government minister—was given a fictionalized backstory as a famous monkey actor.

Sid Miller, Donald Trump, and Donald Trump Jr. were originally in the film, but their scenes were cut. Comedian Luenell was filmed as the character Luenell, the prostitute who marries Borat at the end of the first film, but her scenes were also cut.

== Production ==
=== Development ===
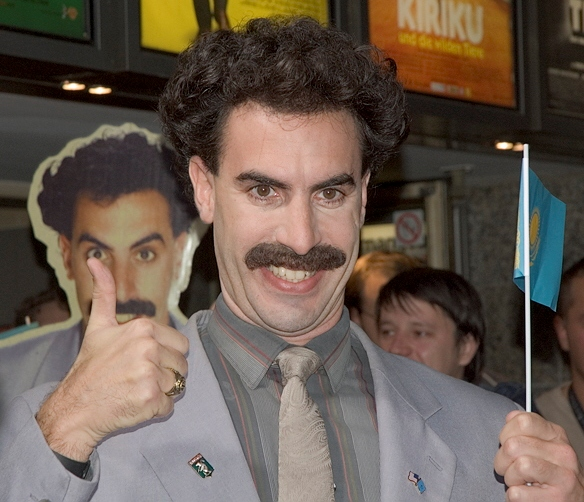
Sacha Baron Cohen in character as Borat, at the Cologne premiere of the first film in 2006. Baron Cohen was initially hesitant to make a sequel, killing off his character in 2007 and only resurrecting him in 2018 for voting ads.

Rupert Murdoch announced in early February 2007 that Baron Cohen had signed on to do another Borat film with 20th Century Fox, distributor of the first film. Baron Cohen later claimed that Borat was to be discontinued, as he was now too well known to avoid detection as he did in the film and on Da Ali G Show. A spokesman for Fox later stated that it was too early to begin planning such a film, although they were open to the idea. In 2014, he brought back Borat for the FXX series Ali G: Rezurection, a compilation of the sketches from Da Ali G Show with new footage. He also briefly appeared as Borat in December 2015 on an episode of Jimmy Kimmel Live! to promote the film Grimsby and again in November 2018 to encourage Americans to vote in that year's midterm elections. In the two years leading up to the release, the film's star became more concerned about being politically active, giving speeches and interviews in-person to combat racism; he insisted on releasing the film immediately before the 2020 presidential election to provoke alarm among Americans about a slide into illiberal democracy.

Like several of Sacha Baron Cohen's films, the score is composed by his brother Erran Baron Cohen, in addition to other original recordings by Romanian Balkan band Fanfare Ciocărlia and their version of "Just the Two of Us"; Canadian roots musician Adrian Raso performing "Urn St. Tavern".

=== Filming ===
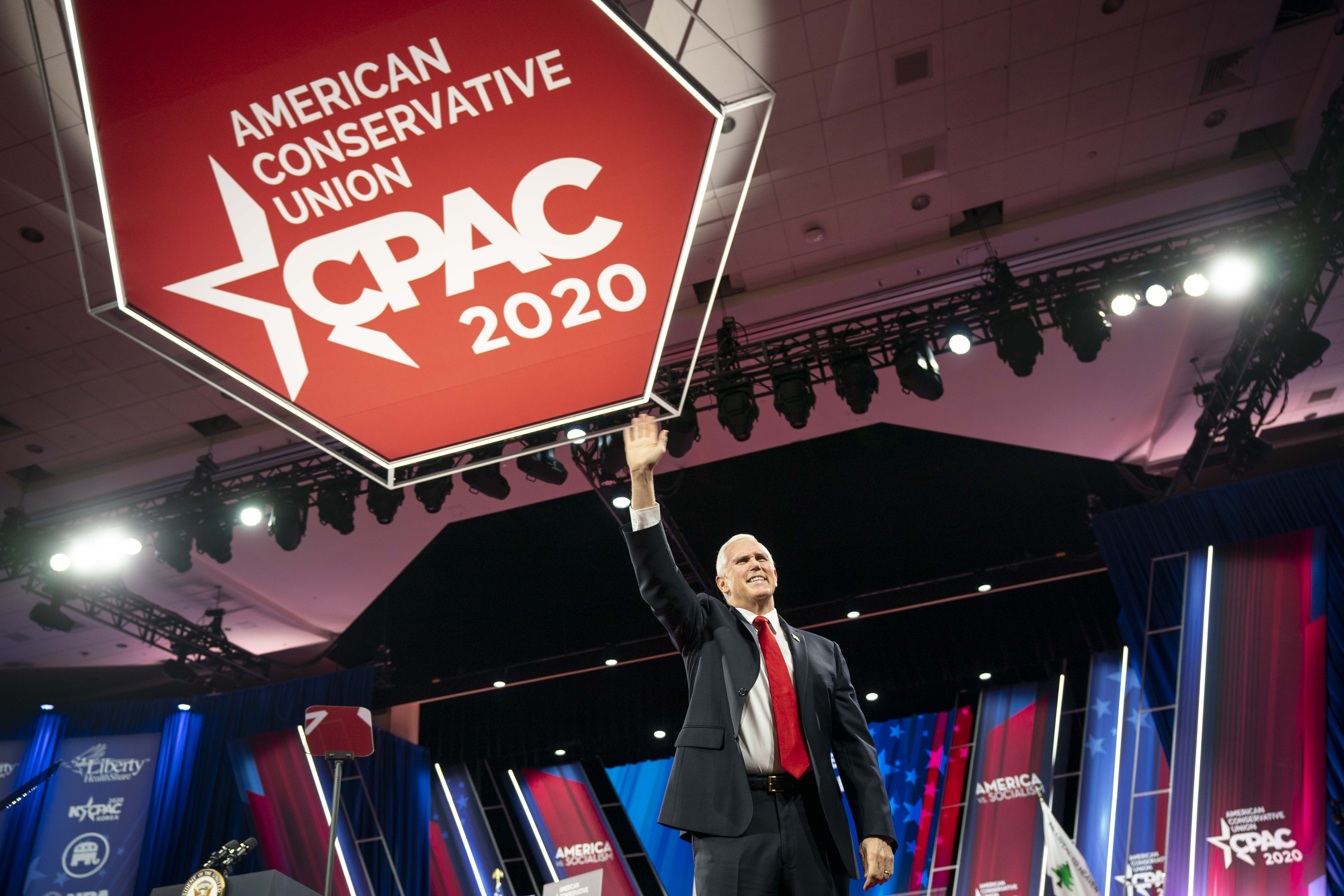
Mike Pence at the 2020 American Conservative Union CPAC, shortly before Baron Cohen interrupted his speech.

Filming did not begin until Tutar was cast; Bakalova was chosen for the role among 600 actresses who auditioned. She initially sent in a tape of her acting for an unnamed Hollywood movie she suspected may have been a human trafficking scam, but she ended up going to London to rehearse with Baron Cohen, convincing her that this was a real opportunity. Ken Davitian, who portrayed Azamat Bagatov in the first Borat, was offered the opportunity to reprise his role, but did not sign on because the producers would not tell him that the film was a Borat sequel. An early prank filmed in late 2019 involved a farcical interview with Texas Agriculture Commissioner Sid Miller, followed by a trip to an Arlington, Texas driving range; the scenes were cut from the film but appear in the trailer. In February 2020, Baron Cohen was spotted dressed up as Donald Trump, interrupting the Conservative Political Action Conference (CPAC), although his true identity was not revealed at the time.

That same month, Baron Cohen traveled to Macon, Georgia, to trick attendees of a fake debutante ball, telling the organizers at the Johnston–Felton–Hay House that he was filming a coming-of-age story. He was briefly pulled over by a police officer for having Bakalova riding on the roof of his vehicle; body cam footage clearly shows he was identified as himself the comedian, as opposed to his character. The crew also attended Marietta-based Temple Kol Emeth to film the scenes with Evans. The production made at least two visits to upstate South Carolina to film at a bakery, crisis pregnancy center, and Halloween supply store. On June 27, 2020, Baron Cohen performed pranks at a gun rally in Olympia, Washington, leading attendees to sing along with racist lyrics to an original song, and interviewed members of the crowd. When demonstrators picketing the rally recognized Baron Cohen and began laughing, the crowd and organizers realized they were being pranked and quickly turned violent, but were slowed from storming the stage as security had been hired by the Borat team. Eventually, Baron Cohen and his crew were forced to flee in a private ambulance, with Baron Cohen having to physically hold the door shut as members of the crowd tried to break in. News media quickly learned about the prank but speculated it was for a new season of Who Is America?

The following month, he was spotted in Los Angeles dressed as Borat and filming, leading to speculation from the public that Baron Cohen's next project was a Borat sequel. During two days of filming, Baron Cohen was required to wear a bulletproof vest due to the possible threats of the scene.

In early September 2020, rumors began to circulate claiming that the film was completely shot, assembled, and screened for film industry executives; the title was originally leaked as Borat 2: Great Success and then Borat: Gift of Pornographic Monkey to Vice Premiere Mikhael Pence to Make Benefit Recently Diminished Nation of Kazakhstan, where the latter was used as one of the title cards. On September 20, a prank involving Bakalova infiltrating the White House and being interviewed by Chanel Rion of One America News Network was filmed but cut from the final release. The village sequences set in Kazakhstan were shot in Romania (specifically the commune of Valea Albeștiului in Albești, Mureș County), but not the same village as the previous film after negative feedback from the villagers. Romanian actors were hired for a few parts.

The film was shot on 72 different cameras, including both high-end cinema cameras and smartphones. The production utilized simple codecs to mimic the look of the original movie. The Arri Amira and Alexa Mini were the A, B, and C cameras, accompanied by lesser cameras for hidden, robotic, and low profile applications, including iPhones. Titmouse, Inc. produced animation services.

== Release ==
In September 2020, Amazon Studios acquired distribution rights to the film for $80 million, and scheduled it for an October 23 release. The film was originally going to be released theatrically by Universal Pictures after a negative pickup deal between Universal and Baron Cohen. Since Baron Cohen wanted the film to be seen by the widest audience possible before the elections and Universal was at odds with theater chains over its release of Trolls World Tour in PVOD, while theatrical box office was showing weak numbers during the COVID-19 pandemic, as a PVOD release would required a separate transaction between Universal and Baron Cohen, Baron Cohen and Universal agreed to look for potential buyers for the film in streaming services. Baron Cohen presented the movie to several streamers who were not willing to release it due to its political content. With the deal with Amazon Studios, Universal was repaid by its outlay and Baron Cohen was compensated in a manner he would have had Universal released the film theatrically. The first trailer was released on October 1, 2020, confirming that several of Baron Cohen's pranks were shot for this film.

=== Promotion and marketing ===
In the two weeks leading up to the film release, Amazon spent $20.4 million on marketing.

Baron Cohen joined social media outlets Instagram, TikTok, and Twitter in-character as Borat to comment on American politics in the run-up to the election and promote the film release, including congratulating Donald Trump for winning the first of the 2020 United States presidential debates before the event began, and starting a "feud" with Ariana Grande for stealing a cut-out of Borat installed at a drive-in theater. The social media push also involved a Twitch stream playing video games with DrLupo and meeting YouTube influencers. He also made a return to Jimmy Kimmel Live! in character a few days before the film's release.

Amazon Prime UK promoted the film by projecting an image of Borat in an extremely small mankini resembling a face mask on the side of several historic sites in Scotland. In Australia's Bondi Beach, 40 Borat look-alikes descended onto the sands to do a yoga class in the "maskini" gear, accompanied by a large statue. During the second presidential debate, Baron Cohen hosted a watch party to debut the film in-character, followed by an afterparty made up of dance music and questions from fans via a live chat. A further stunt involved a large inflatable Borat floating in a barge along the Toronto waterfront and in front of London's Palace of Westminster. The Cerne Abbas Giant was also defaced with a mask and the slogan "WEAR MASK. SAVE LIVE".

Amazon additionally collaborated with YouTube pranksters to trick Stephen Bear, Jimmy Carr, Perrie Edwards, David Spade, David Walliams, and Ann Widdecombe into a false audition for a third Borat film, convincing them to act as a Kazakhstani ambassador. The company also modified their Alexa service to give potato news from Borat.

== Reception ==
=== Critical response ===
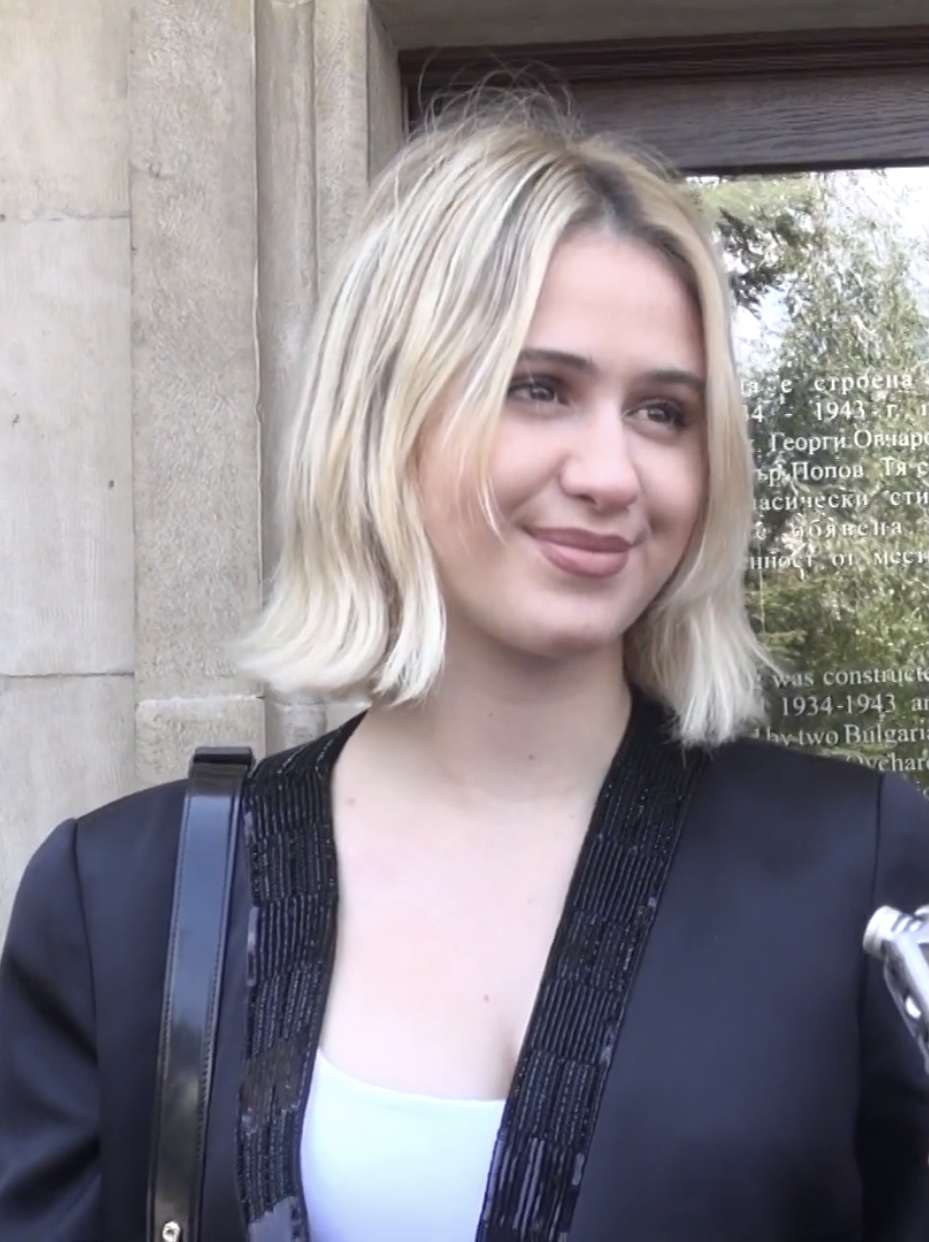
Maria Bakalova's performance garnered widespread critical acclaim and earned her a nomination for the Academy Award for Best Supporting Actress.

Metacritic, which uses a weighted average, assigned the film a score of 68 out of 100, based on 49 critics, indicating "generally favorable" reviews. On Rotten Tomatoes, 85% of 306 critics positively reviewed the film, with an average rating of 7.2/10. The site's critics consensus reads: "Borat Subsequent Moviefilm proves Sacha Baron Cohen's comedic creation remains a sharp tool for exposing the most misguided—or outright repugnant—corners of American culture." Most publications said the film received generally positive reviews, though the BBC and Reuters summed up the critical consensus as "mixed".

Eric Kohn of IndieWire gave the film an A− and wrote: "Fourteen years after his last romp, Borat isn't exactly woke, but his time has come: This searing brand of humor has never felt more essential. Blending activism with entertainment, Baron Cohen's best movie to date gives us new reasons to be afraid of the world, but also permission to laugh at it". Richard Roeper of the Chicago Sun-Times gave the film three out of four stars and wrote: "Fourteen years after Kazakhstan journalist Borat came to America to make a documentary about our great nation, he's back in the USA—older, dumber, far more famous and arguably even more politically incorrect and offensively funny than he was in 2006".

In The Guardian, Peter Bradshaw gave the film three out of five stars, saying "there are still some real laughs and pointed political moments" but that it "overstays its welcome". Jesse Hassenger of The A.V. Club gave the film a B− and called it "frequently funny and occasionally pointed" but "also another instance where doing things as they've always been done no longer feels like quite enough". Similarly, Devika Girish of The New York Times notes how the sequel is not as shocking or insightful as the first film, summing up, "[the] elaborate ruses of Borat Subsequent Moviefilm left me neither entertained nor enraged, but simply resigned".

In a review for The Daily Telegraph, Robbie Collin awarded the film two of five stars, calling the film "despairingly threadbare" and "a string of half-formed, recycled and disjointed pranks you suspect wouldn't have survived the quality-control process on the original, effortfully connected post hoc by largely uninspired scripted scenes". Longtime Chicago Tribune film columnist Michael Philips gave the film two stars, calling the sequel "ruder" and "more sentimental" than its predecessor. Phillips summarized his reaction as having "laughed at a good deal of the movie, but a good deal more of it left [him] with (Cohen's [sic] intention, probably) the taste of ashes in the mouth". Alonso Duralde of The Wrap negatively reviewed the movie, believing it "valiantly fails to resuscitate the satire corpse". Duralde, a self-avowed "superfan" of the first film, writes that "the sequel might (in, one hopes, a happier future) be hilarious in retrospect, but at the moment, it's a mostly cringe-worthy experience".

Accolades received by Borat Subsequent Moviefilm
Award	Date of ceremony	Category	Recipient(s)	Result
Academy Awards	April 25, 2021	Best Supporting Actress	Maria Bakalova	Nominated
Academy Awards	April 25, 2021	Best Adapted Screenplay	Sacha Baron Cohen, Anthony Hines, Dan Swimer, Peter Baynham, Erica Rivinoja, Dan Mazer, Jena Friedman, Lee Kern and Nina Pedrad	Nominated
Actor Awards	April 4, 2021	Outstanding Performance by a Female Actor in a Supporting Role	Maria Bakalova	Nominated
American Cinema Editors Awards	April 17, 2021	Best Edited Feature Film – Comedy	James Thomas, Craig Alpert and Mike Giambra	Nominated
Artios Awards	April 15, 2021	Feature Big Budget – Comedy	Nancy Bishop	Won
British Academy Film Awards	April 11, 2021	Best Supporting Actress	Maria Bakalova	Nominated
Critics' Choice Movie Awards	March 7, 2021	Best Comedy	Borat Subsequent Moviefilm	Nominated
Critics' Choice Movie Awards	March 7, 2021	Best Supporting Actress	Maria Bakalova	Won
Golden Globe Awards	February 28, 2021	Best Motion Picture – Musical or Comedy	Borat Subsequent Moviefilm	Won
Golden Globe Awards	February 28, 2021	Best Actor in a Motion Picture – Musical or Comedy	Sacha Baron Cohen	Won
Golden Globe Awards	February 28, 2021	Best Actress in a Motion Picture – Musical or Comedy	Maria Bakalova	Nominated
Golden Raspberry Awards	April 24, 2021	Worst Supporting Actor	Rudy Giuliani	Won
Golden Raspberry Awards	April 24, 2021	Worst Screen Combo	Rudy Giuliani and his pants zipper	Won
Golden Trailer Awards	July 22, 2021	Best Comedy	"Epic Journey" (JAX)	Nominated
Golden Trailer Awards	July 22, 2021	Best Comedy TV Spot (for a Feature Film)	"Changed" (Motive)	Nominated
Golden Trailer Awards	July 22, 2021	Best Voice Over TV Spot (for a Feature Film)	"Changed" (Motive)	Nominated
Golden Trailer Awards	July 22, 2021	Best Comedy Poster	"Maskini" (Concept Arts)	Nominated
Golden Trailer Awards	July 22, 2021	Best Original Poster	"Maskini" (Concept Arts)	Won
Golden Trailer Awards	July 22, 2021	Best Billboard (for a Feature Film or TV/Streaming Series)	"Maskini" (Concept Arts)	Nominated
Golden Trailer Awards	July 22, 2021	Most Innovative Advertising for a Feature Film	"Face Mask and Hand Sanitizing Station" (Empire)	Nominated
Make-Up Artists and Hair Stylists Guild Awards	April 3, 2021	Best Contemporary Make-Up in a Feature-Length Motion Picture	Katy Fray, Lisa Layman and Thomas Kolarek	Nominated
Make-Up Artists and Hair Stylists Guild Awards	April 3, 2021	Best Contemporary Hair Styling in a Feature-Length Motion Picture	Kimberly Boyenger and Tyler Ely	Nominated
MTV Movie & TV Awards	May 16, 2021	Best Movie	Borat Subsequent Moviefilm	Nominated
MTV Movie & TV Awards	May 16, 2021	Best Breakthrough Performance	Maria Bakalova	Nominated
MTV Movie & TV Awards	May 16, 2021	Best Duo	Borat and Tutar Sagdiyev	Nominated
National Society of Film Critics Awards	January 9, 2021	Best Supporting Actress	Maria Bakalova	Won
Online Film Critics Society Awards	January 25, 2021	Best Supporting Actress	Maria Bakalova	Won
Producers Guild of America Awards	March 24, 2021	Best Theatrical Motion Picture	Sacha Baron Cohen, Monica Levinson and Anthony Hines	Nominated
Set Decorators Society of America Awards	March 31, 2021	Best Achievement in Décor/Design of a Comedy or Musical Feature Film	Alina Pentac and David Saenz de Maturana	Nominated
Writers Guild of America Awards	March 21, 2021	Best Adapted Screenplay	Sacha Baron Cohen, Anthony Hines, Dan Swimer, Peter Baynham, Erica Rivinoja, Dan Mazer, Jena Friedman, Lee Kern & Nina Pedrad	Won

=== Response from Kazakhstan ===
Unlike the reception of the first Borat movie, which was denounced by the Kazakh state as a libellous smear against the people of Kazakhstan, and resulted in threatened legal action against Baron Cohen and his distributors, the release of the sequel received a more mixed reception. The Kazakh American Association denounced the film for promoting racism, cultural appropriation and xenophobia. On the other hand, the tourism board of Kazakhstan appropriated a key catchphrase, "very nice", to promote the advantages of visiting Kazakhstan, capitalizing on the increased public interest in Kazakhstan as a result of the first film.

== Controversies ==
=== Rudy Giuliani appearance ===
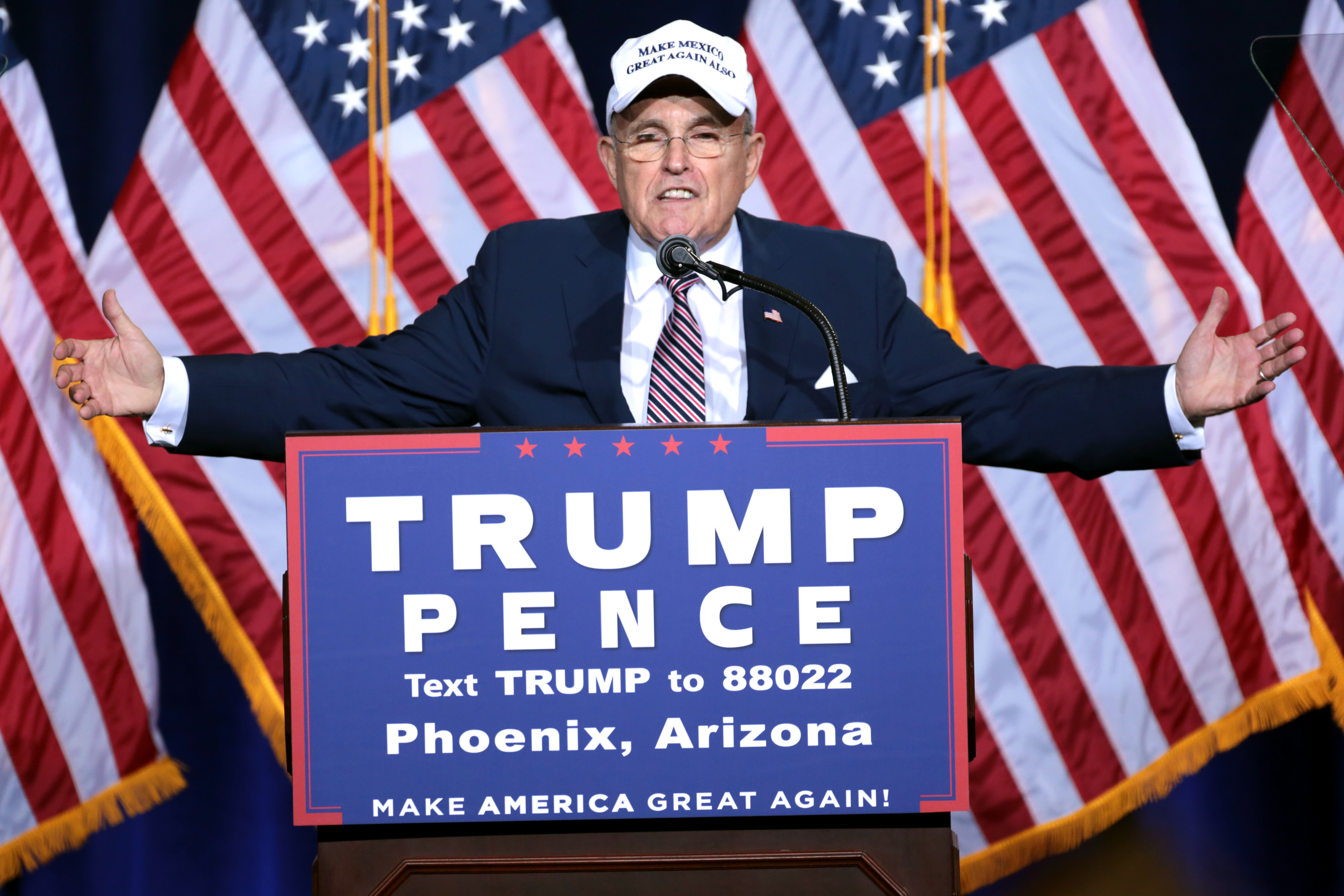
The actions of President Donald Trump's lawyer Rudy Giuliani in the film incited controversy.

Rudy Giuliani was criticized for his actions in a scene in which he slides his hand into the top of his trousers in front of actress Maria Bakalova, who is impersonating a journalist. Following an interview in a hotel room, the pair retreat to the bedroom, where Giuliani's voice is heard (facing away from the camera) asking for an address and phone number. After Bakalova removes his microphone, thus untucking his shirt, Giuliani lies back on the bed and appears to move his hands towards his pants. Baron Cohen then bursts into the room exclaiming "She 15! She too old for you!" Giuliani denied allegations of impropriety, claiming that the allegations were a smear for Giuliani's Hunter Biden laptop controversy despite the scene having been filmed months before the controversy occurred.

Controversy over what happened in the scene led Baron Cohen to record a brief clip as Borat regarding Giuliani. In an out-of-character interview, Baron Cohen remarked, "Heaven knows what he's done with other female journalists in hotel rooms," and stood by the accuracy of the scene: "It is what it is. He did what he did." While on the campaign trail, Donald Trump called Baron Cohen unfunny and "a creep". Baron Cohen thanked him for the remarks. The debate followed Giuliani in subsequent media appearances, such as when Fox News anchor Kennedy confronted him about the scene as well as the veracity of the Biden emails. Baron Cohen continued the feud by mocking Giuliani's Four Seasons Total Landscaping press conference and rescinding an earlier job offer to Trump for being a loser in the 2020 United States presidential election.

=== Accusations of unfair treatment ===
The film's creators were sued for fraud after including an interview with Holocaust survivor Judith Dim Evans. Evans died before the film's release, but her heirs brought the lawsuit alleging that she did not consent to the commercial use of her likeness in the film. Baron Cohen—who dedicated the film to her memory—claimed that he broke character to address Evans's concerns about Borat's anti-Semitic comments, revealing the satirical nature of the piece. The lawsuit was dismissed on October 26, three days after the movie's release.

The New York Post reported that babysitter Jeanise Jones felt "betrayed" by the filmmakers who told her that she was going to be in a documentary about a young woman being groomed to marry an older man; she did not find out the true nature of the film until the day before it was released. She later disputed that statement, saying that she was not angry at the filmmakers, and that it was her fault for not reading the release papers. When asked if her $3600 payment for her appearance seemed fair, Jones replied that "I can't say it was fair because they knew it was going to be a movie, and I didn't." Acclaiming her as the "moral compass" of the film and mentioning that she was unemployed as a result of COVID layoffs, a GoFundMe campaign started by Jones's pastor raised over $50,000 for her in three days and more than $150,000 by the end of the week. Baron Cohen donated $100,000 to her community of Oklahoma City, with funds disbursed by her church. Jones was cast as an angel in a comedy film as a result of her appearance in Borat Subsequent Moviefilm. Maria Bakalova revealed in January 2021 that she has kept in touch with Jones.

=== Accusations of racism ===
"The humor of Borat is incomprehensible to the majority of people in Kazakhstan, although the film is somewhat funny... At least people look on the map to find out if this is a real country but there are also negative consequences. A friend of mine who lives in the United States told me that Americans of Kazakh origin began to experience bullying."

— Kazakh satirist Murat Dilmanov on reception of Borat in Kazakhstan and international attention on his homeland.

The character of Borat has been controversial in Kazakhstan, with the original film being censored for a period and Baron Cohen's website blocked in the country. In the lead-up to the sequel, Kazakhs took to Twitter with the hashtag #CancelBorat. An online petition urging the film to be canceled garnered over 100,000 signatures and small protests gathered in front of the American embassy in Almaty the day of the premiere. Kazakhs and Westerners alike renewed criticism that the character uses comedy to "punch down" by picking on the more marginalized Kazakhs by arbitrarily mocking their accents and stereotyping them, and the Kazakh American Association issued a letter alleging that the film promotes "racism, cultural appropriation, and xenophobia"; in the lead up to the film awards seasons, they issued a second letter asking organizations to not consider the film. The character has created misperceptions of Kazakhstan. Nevertheless, the national tourism agency Kazakh Tourism capitalized on the renewed international attention the film brought by adopting Borat's catchphrase as its slogan—"Kazakhstan. Very Nice!"—and produced a number of videos featuring it.

Marketing for the film drew ire from the British National Trust for defacing the Cerne Abbas Giant and from Parisian Muslims who objected to posters of the near-nude Borat evidently wearing a ring with "Allah" inscribed on it; the posters were removed.

== Audience viewership ==
Following the film's first weekend, Amazon, Inc. declined to give precise numbers for the number of viewers but stated that it was "tens of millions" globally. Estimates by Samba TV put the number of U.S. households who watched during that first weekend at 1.6 million; Amazon claims these numbers are inaccurate. Based on social media mentions, MarketCast tracked 1.1 million hits across the week leading up to and just following the film's release; that left it second only to Hamilton in mentions in 2020. Nielsen ratings for streaming in the week of October 19 placed Borat Subsequent Moviefilm at the eighth most-watched program, with 570 million minutes, the equivalent to 5.9 million viewings. In November, Variety reported the film was the second-most watched straight-to-streaming title of 2020 up to that point.

== Miniseries ==
In April 2021, the follow-up miniseries, Borat 2: Supplemental Reportings featuring deleted scenes from Subsequent Moviefilm was announced. On May 24, 2021, Amazon Prime released the video short Borat: VHS Cassette of Material Deemed 'Sub-acceptable' by Kazakhstan Ministry of Censorship and Circumcision, and seven-episode miniseries, Borat's American Lockdown & Debunking Borat, featuring additional unrelated footage shot during production of Borat Subsequent Moviefilm, including more of his quarantine lockdown with Jim and Jerry. It also features a rare clip of Baron Cohen breaking character while still in costume, from when the Borat crew was chased away from the gun rally in Washington: Baron Cohen is clearly shown giving warnings to his crew as they evacuate in their hired ambulance.

== Future ==
In January 2021, Baron Cohen told Variety that there are no plans for a third movie, saying, "There was a purpose to this movie, and I don't really see the purpose to doing it again. So yeah, he's locked away in the cupboard." The following month, Baron Cohen revealed he intended to retire the character of Borat because of risks to his personal safety, feeling anxious over the March for Our Rights scene from the film.

== See also ==
- List of Bulgarian Academy Award winners and nominees
