= Kazakh American Association =

- Қазақ-Америка Қауымдастығы (Kazakh)
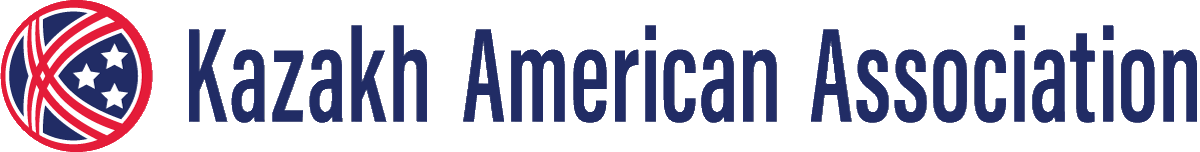
- Abbreviation: KAA
- Formation: 2008
- Founder: Darkhan Nurmagambet
- Type: Non-Profit NGO
- Purpose: Promote Kazakh language and culture
- Headquarters: Washington County, Virginia
- Coordinates: 38°56′7.74″N 77°19′33.91″W
- President: Darkhan Nurmagambet
- Website: https://www.kazakhamericanassociation.org/

Kazakh American Association (Kazakh: Қазақ-Америка Қауымдастығы, Qazaq-Amerika Qawımdastığı, قازاق-امەريكا قاۋىمداستاغى; abbreviated KAA) is a significant cultural and educational organization of the Kazakh diaspora in the United States. It is a non-profit organization located in Washington County, Virginia.

The mission of the association is to preserve the cultural, ethnic, and religious interests of the local Kazakh community.

== History ==
The organization was founded in 2008 as a cultural and educational association.

It was established by Darkhan Nurmagambet, who reportedly worked at NASA for 12 years and is described as the first employee of Kazakh descent within the organization.

In 2019, representatives of the association, together with several Ukrainian public organizations, , participated in public protests against the film Borat Subsequent Moviefilm. Participants stated that both films in the series present a negative portrayal of Kazakhstan and Kazakhs.

On January 7, 2022, members of the association expressed support for protesters in Kazakhstan during the unrest in the country.

The Kazakh American Association holds annual celebrations of Nauryz (the national holiday of Kazakhs and other peoples of Central Asia), informal meetings of Kazakhs living in the United States and from other countries, various cultural projects and events.
