= List of Academy Award winners and nominees from Bulgaria =

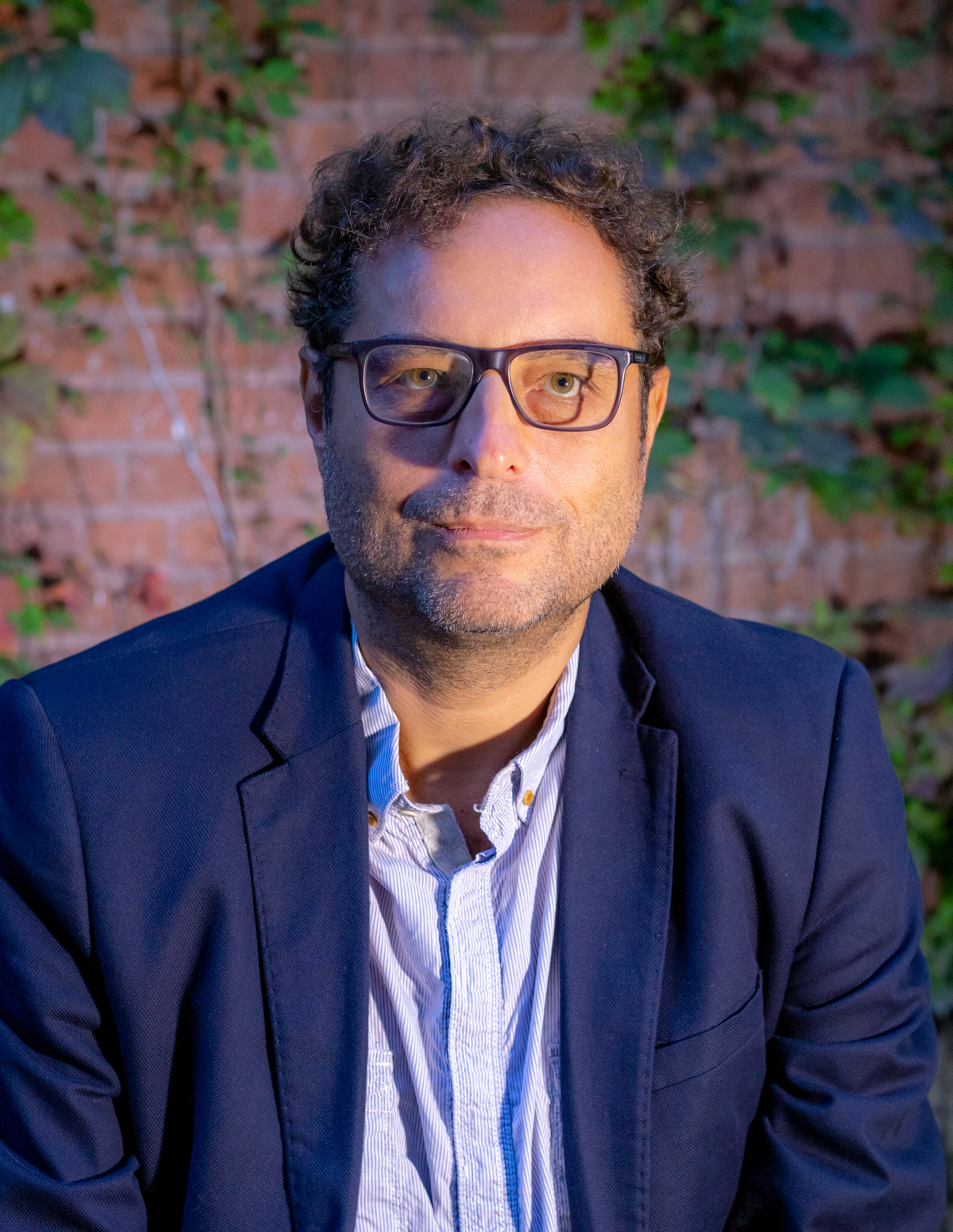
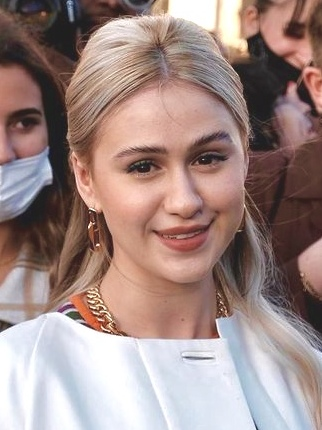
Theodore Ushev (left) and Maria Bakalova were the first Bulgarians to be nominated for an Oscar in the competitive categories, receiving nominations for Best Animated Short for Blind Vaysha (2016), and Best Supporting Actress for Borat Subsequent Moviefilm (2020), respectively.

Several Bulgarian individuals and Bulgarian-produced films have been nominated for the Academy Awards in different categories. As of 2022, four Bulgarians have been nominated and two have won Oscars including in the scientific and technical category.

At the 44th Academy Awards, Dimitar Petrov's 1971 film Porcupines Are Born Without Bristles was Bulgaria's first submission for the Academy Award for Best International Feature Film category. At the 82nd Academy Awards, The World Is Big and Salvation Lurks Around the Corner became the first Bulgarian film to be shortlisted to compete in the category; however, it was not nominated.

In 2017, filmmaker Theodore Ushev became the first Bulgarian person to be nominated for an Academy Award in a competitive category, receiving a nomination for Best Animated Short Film for Blind Vaysha (2016).

== Competitive awards ==
Competitive awards
Year	Nominee(s)	Film	Category	Result	Ref.
2017 (89th)	Theodore Ushev	Blind Vaysha	Best Animated Short Film	Nominated	
2021 (93rd)	Maria Bakalova	Borat Subsequent Moviefilm	Best Supporting Actress	Nominated	

== Scientific and technical awards ==
Scientific and technical awards
Year	Nominee(s)/recipient(s)	Category	Note	Ref.
2001	George Borshukov (Note: For the development of a system for image-based rendering allowing choreographed camera movements through computer graphic reconstructed sets.)	Academy Award for Technical Achievement	Shared the award with Kim Libreri and Dan Piponi.	
2014	George Borshukov (Note: For their pioneering work in the development of Universal Capture at ESC Entertainment.)	Academy Award for Technical Achievement	Shared the award with Dan Piponi and Kim Libreri.	
2017	Vladimir Koylazov (Note: For the original concept, design and implementation of V-Ray from Chaos Group.)	Academy Award for Technical Achievement		

== See also ==
- List of Bulgarian submissions for the Academy Award for Best International Feature Film
- Cinema of Bulgaria
