= Malin Krastev =

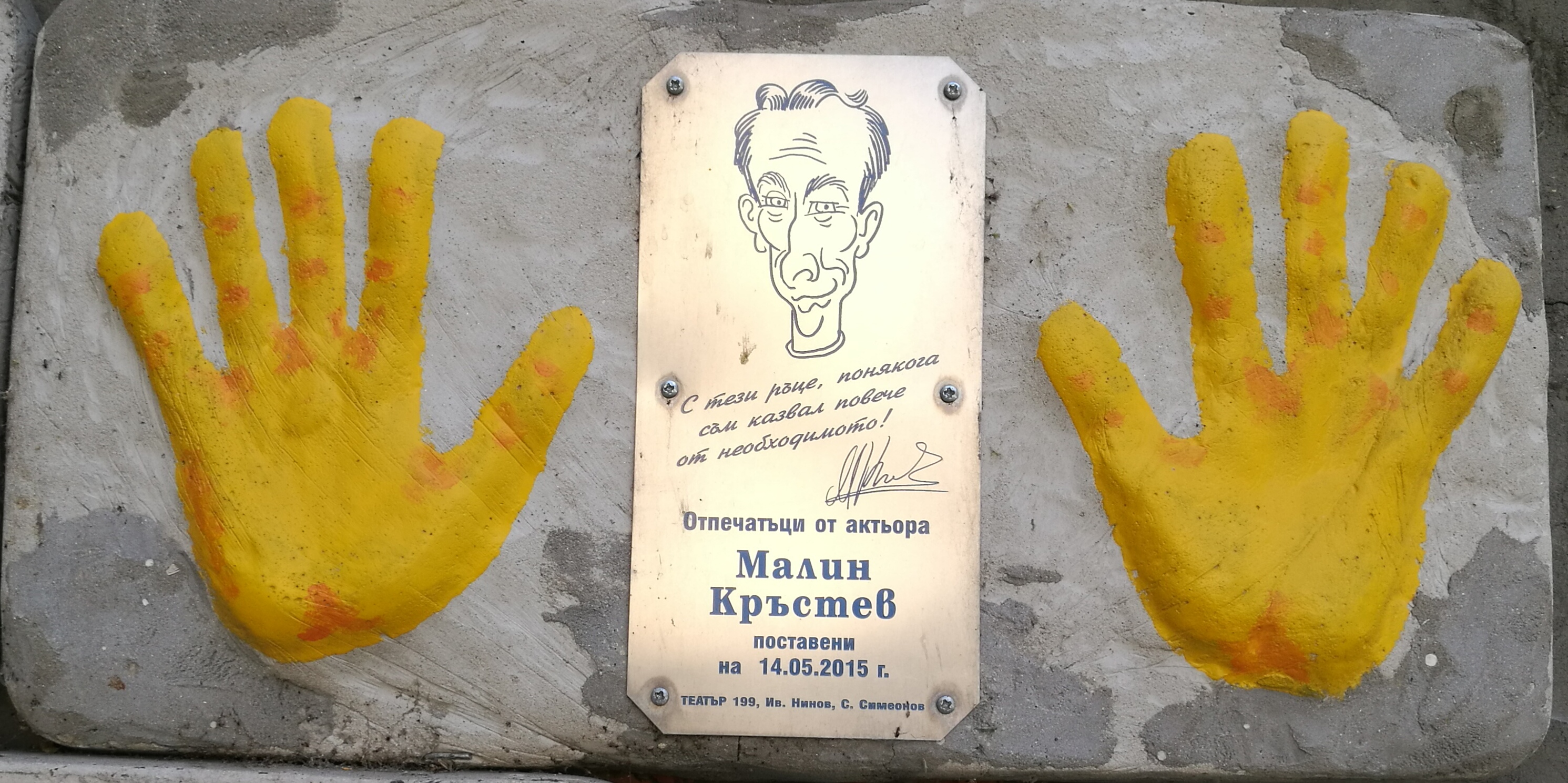
MALIN KRASTEV-t199.jpg

Malin Krastev (Bulgarian: Малин Кръстев; April 23, 1970, Sofia), is a Bulgarian male director and actor. His major roles include the films Stonehearst Asylum (2014) and Petrov File (2015). He also plays the character Storch on the television series Magna Aura.
