= Askeer Awards =

Annual awards for theatrical achievements

- Awarded for: Exceptional contribution to Bulgarian theatre art
- Country: Bulgaria
- Presented by: A'Askeer Foundation
- First award: 1991; 35 years ago
- Website: askeer.bg

Television/radio coverage
- Network: BNT

The Askeer Awards (/æsˈkɛr/ æs-KHER) are presented annually by the A'Askeer Foundation to recognise excellence in professional theatre in Bulgaria. They are the oldest theatre awards in Bulgaria, and are given to actors, directors, composers and poets for their contributions to Bulgarian stage arts.

Initially created as a parody of the Academy Awards in 1991, the Askeer Awards are among the most significant events honoring theatre in Bulgaria. The awards are given across a range of categories covering directing, acting, production, music, design and costumes. A discretionary non-competitive Honorary Askeer is also given non-annually.

== History ==
In 1991, a group of Bulgarian actors decided to create a theatre parody version of the Academy Awards. They named the awards "Askeer" as an allusion to the "Oscars", and the first statuettes were made of paper. The same year, the first award ceremony was held at the National Palace of Culture in Sofia with winners awarded in eight categories. The following year, the number of categories expanded from 8 to 11. In 1994, theatres from all over Bulgaria were eligible to be nominated for the first time, as opposed to only those located in Sofia.

In 2007, the Foundation established the Honorary Askeer category, awarded for creative honor and contribution to the development of theatre art. The distinction is not awarded annually, but on special occasions. The Bulgarian National Television has aired the award ceremony since 2017.

== Nomination ==
The nominees and winners in all categories are determined by the members of the A'Askeer Foundation. Artists and performances from the Bulgarian Army Theater are not subject to nominations and awards. The weight of each voter's vote in the nominations stage is determined by the number of performances they have seen, and the voting is anonymous.

== Categories ==
=== Competitive categories ===
As of 2022, winners are chosen from the following 12 categories:

- Best Play
- Best Director
- Best Lead Male Performance
- Best Lead Female Performance
- Best Supporting Male Role
- Best Supporting Female Role
- Contemporary Bulgarian Dramaturgy
- Best Solo Performance
- Rising Star
- Best Scenography
- Best Costume Design
- Best Theatre Music

=== Special categories ===
- Honorary Askeer: since 2007
