= Transgressive segregation =

Process in genetics

In genetics, transgressive segregation is the formation of extreme phenotypes, or transgressive phenotypes, observed in segregated hybrid populations compared to phenotypes observed in the parental lines. The appearance of these transgressive (extreme) phenotypes can be either positive or negative in terms of fitness. If both parents' favorable alleles come together, it will result in a hybrid having a higher fitness than the two parents. The hybrid species will show more genetic variation and variation in gene expression than their parents. As a result, the hybrid species will have some traits that are transgressive (extreme) in nature. Transgressive segregation can allow a hybrid species to populate different environments/niches in which the parent species do not reside, or compete in the existing environment with the parental species.

== Causes ==
Genetic

There are many causes for transgressive segregation in hybrids. One cause can be due to recombination of additive alleles. Recombination results in new pairs of alleles at two or more loci. These different pairs of alleles can give rise to new phenotypes if gene expression has been changed at these loci. Another cause can be elevated mutation rate. When mutation rates are high, it is more probable that a mutation will occur and cause an extreme phenotypic change. Reduced developmental stability is another cause for transgressive segregation. Developmental stability refers to the capability of a genotype to go through a constant development of a phenotype in a certain environmental setting. If there is a disturbance due to genetic or environmental factors, the genotype will be more sensitive to phenotypic changes. Another cause arises from the interaction between two alleles of two different genes, also known as the epistatic effect. Epistasis is the event when one allele at a locus prevents an allele at another locus to express its product as if it is masking its effect. Therefore, epistasis can be related to gene over dominance caused by heterozygosity at specific loci.[2] What this means is that the heterozygote (hybrid) when compared to the homozygote (parent) is better adapted and therefore shows more transgressive, extreme phenotypes. All of these causes lead to the appearance of these extreme phenotypes and creates a hybrid species that will deviate away from the parent species niche and eventually create an individual "hybrid" species.

Environmental

Other than the genetic factors solely causing transgressive segregation, environmental factors can cause genetic factors to take place. Environmental factors that cause transgressive segregation can be influenced by human activity and climate change. Both human activity and climate change have the capability to force species of a specific genome to interact with other species with different genomes.

For example, if a bridge is built that connects two isolated areas to one another, a gene flow door would open. This open door will increase the interactions between different species with different genomes can create hybrid species that can potentially show transgressive phenotypes. Human activity can open the gene flow door by pursuing harmful actions such as cutting down forests and pollution. Climate change on the other hand can open the gene flow door by breaking climate and environmental barriers that were present before. This convergence between species can give rise to a hybrid species that will have more phenotypic variation when compared to the parent species. This increase in phenotypic variation has the potential for transgressive segregation to occur.

== Examples of transgressive segregation ==
In Kenya, there is a fungus called septoria tritici blotch (STB) that diminishes yield in wheat crop. The parent species of wheat had little resistance toward STB, but the hybrid species due to transgressive segregation showed a higher resistance toward STB and therefore a higher fitness. You can create a higher resistance to STB by crossing genes together that are efficient. In result, out of 36 crosses there were 31 that showed a higher mean fitness than the control, parent value. These 31 crosses indicate a higher resistance to STB. The crosses used were from other commercial wheat's that were high yielding which is advantageous because there is a lower chance of deleterious (unwanted traits) appearing and therefore an increase in beneficial traits. Transgressive segregation has been found to be useful to create a resistance toward this organism in order to increase the yield of wheat crop.

Rieseberg used sunflowers to show the transgressive segregation of parental traits. Helianthus annuus and Helianthus petiolaris are the two parent groups for the hybrids. Ultimately there were three hybrid sunflower species. When compared to the fitness of the parents, the hybrids showed a higher tolerance in areas which the parent species would not be able to survive i.e. salt marsh, sand dunes, and deserts. Transgressive segregation allowed these hybrids to survive in areas that the parent would not be able to. Therefore, the hybrids were populated in areas where the parent species were not. This is due to hybrid species showing more gene expression (phenotypes) than their parents and also having some genes that are transgressive (extreme) in nature.

== Testing for transgressive segregation ==
There are many ways to test if transgressive segregation occurred within a population. One common way to test for transgressive segregation is to use a Dunnett's test. This test looks at whether the hybrid species' performance was different from the control group by looking whether or not the mean of the control group (parent species) differs significantly from mean of the other groups. If there is a difference, that is an indication of transgressive segregation. Another commonly used test is the use of quantitative trait loci (QTL) to assess transgressive segregation. Alleles with QTL that were opposed (either by overdominance or underdominance) of the parental parent QTL indicate that transgressive segregation occurred. Alleles with QTL that was the same as the predicted parent QTL showed that there was no transgressive segregation.

== Importance ==
Transgressive segregation creates an opportunity for new hybrid species to arise that are more fit than their ancestors. As seen with the STB in Kenya and Rieseberg's sunflowers, transgressive segregation can be used to create a species that is more adaptable and resistant in areas where there is environmental stress. Transgressive segregation can be seen as genetic engineering in the way that the goal for each of these events is to create an organism that is more fit than the last.
