= Transgression (2017 film) =

2017 film directed by Val Todorov

- Promotional release poster
- Directed by: Val Todorov
- Written by: Val Todorov
- Based on: Daddy Dear by Val Todorov
- Starring: Maria Bakalova; Rosen Penchev; Joanna-Izabella Varbanova
- Cinematography: Kiril Prodanov; Mihail Boevski
- Music by: Smallmen; Cherno Feredje; Beloslava
- Production company: Demiurgia
- Distributed by: HBO
- Release dates: 31 October 2017 (Sofia); 6 May 2021 (HBO)
- Running time: 99 minutes
- Country: Bulgaria
- Language: Bulgarian

Transgression (Bulgarian: Трансгресия) is a 2017 Bulgarian coming-of-age drama film written and directed by Val Todorov, and based on his 2016 novel Daddy Dear. It stars Maria Bakalova, Rosen Penchev and Joanna-Izabella Varbanova, and follows an 18-year old (Bakalova) who has a relationship with an older has-been rock musician (Penchev).

== Plot ==
18-year-old Yana gives an interview on a talk show. Baited and provoked by the irritating and arrogant host, she talks about her life and confesses that she is in an intimate relationship with Stoil, a rock musician who is twice her age. The studio audience, filled with indignation, starts commenting on Yana's revelation, and shows their lack of approval. This leads to a chase by a vigilante group of hunters and other complications.

The film is divided into three parts: Him and Her, The Others, and The Hunt. Its nonlinear narrative follows Yana's memories: wild parties, a motorcycle rally, July Morning, a threesome with her best girlfriend, beach-side bonfires, a crypto-gay machista's birthday, a cheap tattoo shop, a posh spa hotel, wine tasting, pot smoking and transgressive sex.

== Cast ==
- Maria Bakalova as Yana
- Rosen Penchev as Stoil
- Joanna-Izabella Varbanova as Nina
- Lazara Zlatareva as Kaka Lara

== Release ==
The film premiered in Europe in 2017, and had its worldwide release on HBO in 2021.

== Reception ==
The film received several accolades including the Arthouse Feature Film Award at the Depth of Field International Film Festival and Best Actress at the Toronto Alternative Film Festival for Bakalova's role. Bakalova also received a nomination for Best Actress at the Queen Palm Film Festival.
