= Forsand Municipality =

Former municipality in Rogaland, Norway

Forsand Borough
- Borough
- Coat of arms
- Interactive map of Forsand Borough
- Coordinates: 59°00′49″N 06°25′28″E
- Country: Norway
- Region: Western Norway
- County: Rogaland
- District: Jæren
- Municipality: Sandnes

Population (2026)
  - Total: 1,030
- Time zone: UTC+01:00 (CET)
  - Summer (DST): UTC+02:00 (CEST)
- Post Code: 4306 Sandnes

Forsand is a borough in Sandnes and former municipality in Rogaland county, Norway. The borough centre is the village of Forsand, and other villages are Lysebotn, Øvre Espedal, Kolabygda, and Fløyrli.

The borough had a population of 1,030 people in 2026. Forsand surrounds the famous Lysefjorden and it was located on the east side of the Høgsfjorden. In 1999, evidence of a population here dating back to around 7500 BC was uncovered.

The municipality was created in 1871, and merged with Strand and Sandnes in 2020. It had a population of 1,193 and was 780.06 km^{2} (301.18 sq mi) large when it was dissolved in 2020.

== Name ==
The borough (originally the parish) is named after the old Forsand farm (Old Norse: Forsandr) since the first Forsand Church was built there. The first element is for which means "sticking out" or "protruding". The last element is sand which means "sand" or "sandy beach".

Historically, the name of the municipality was spelled Fossan. On 3 November 1917, a royal resolution changed the spelling of the name of the municipality to Forsand.

== Geography ==
Forsand is a large burough that is very mountainous with a long, narrow fjord running through the middle from east to west. The Lysefjorden is surrounded by very steep 1,000-metre (3,300 ft) tall cliffs such as Kjerag and Preikestolen (now in Strand), with the Lysefjord Bridge crossing the fjord near the western end. The highest point in the municipality was the 1,304-metre (4,278 ft) tall mountain Lysekammen.

The famous Kjeragbolten boulder and Kjeragfossen waterfall are located along the inner part of the fjord. The village of Lysebotn is located at the eastern end of the fjord. The lake Nilsebuvatnet is located high up in the mountains, north of Lysebotn along the border with Strand. It is regulated for hydroelectric power use at the Lysebotn Hydroelectric Power Station.

Strand is located to the northwest, Hjelmeland to the north, Bykle to the northeast, Sirdal to the east, Gjesdal to the south, and the rest of Sandnes to the west.

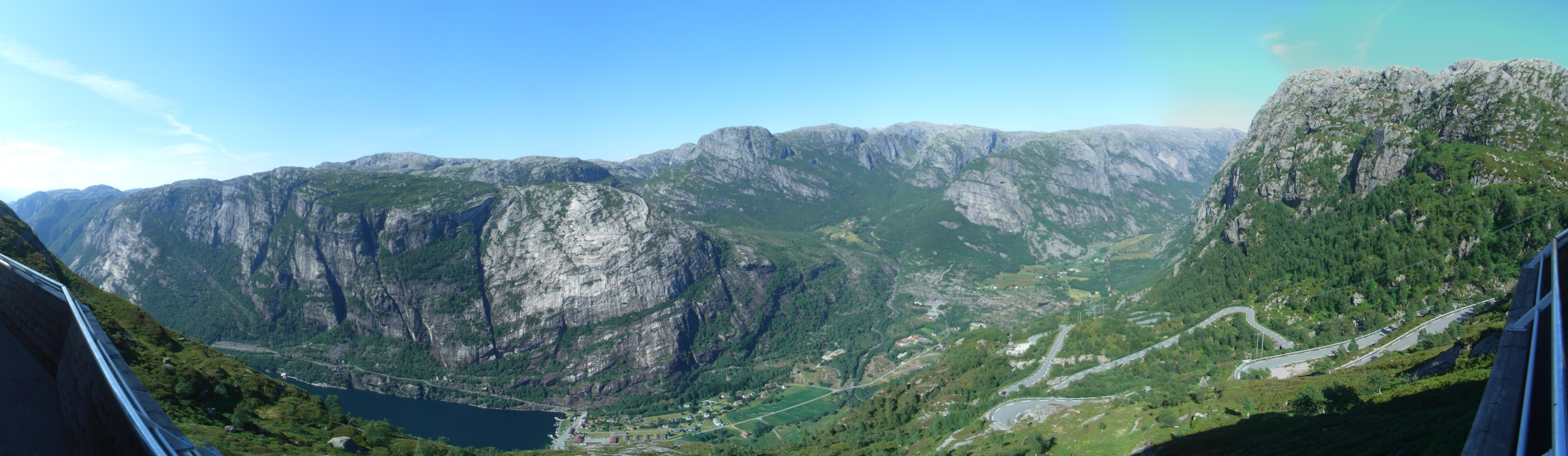
Panoramic view over the village Lysebotn located innermost in the Lysefjord (full image)

== Churches ==
The Church of Norway has one parish (sokn) within Forsand, and two churches. It is part of the Sandnes prosti (deanery) in the Diocese of Stavanger. The parish was transferred from Ryfylke prosti to Sandnes prosti on the dissolusion of the municipality in 2020.

Churches in Forsand
Parish (sokn)	Church name	Location of the church	Year built
Forsand	Forsand Church	Forsand	1854
Forsand	Lyse Chapel	Lysebotn	1961

== Former municipality ==
Forsand Municipality Forsand kommune
- Former municipality
- Fossan herred (historic name)
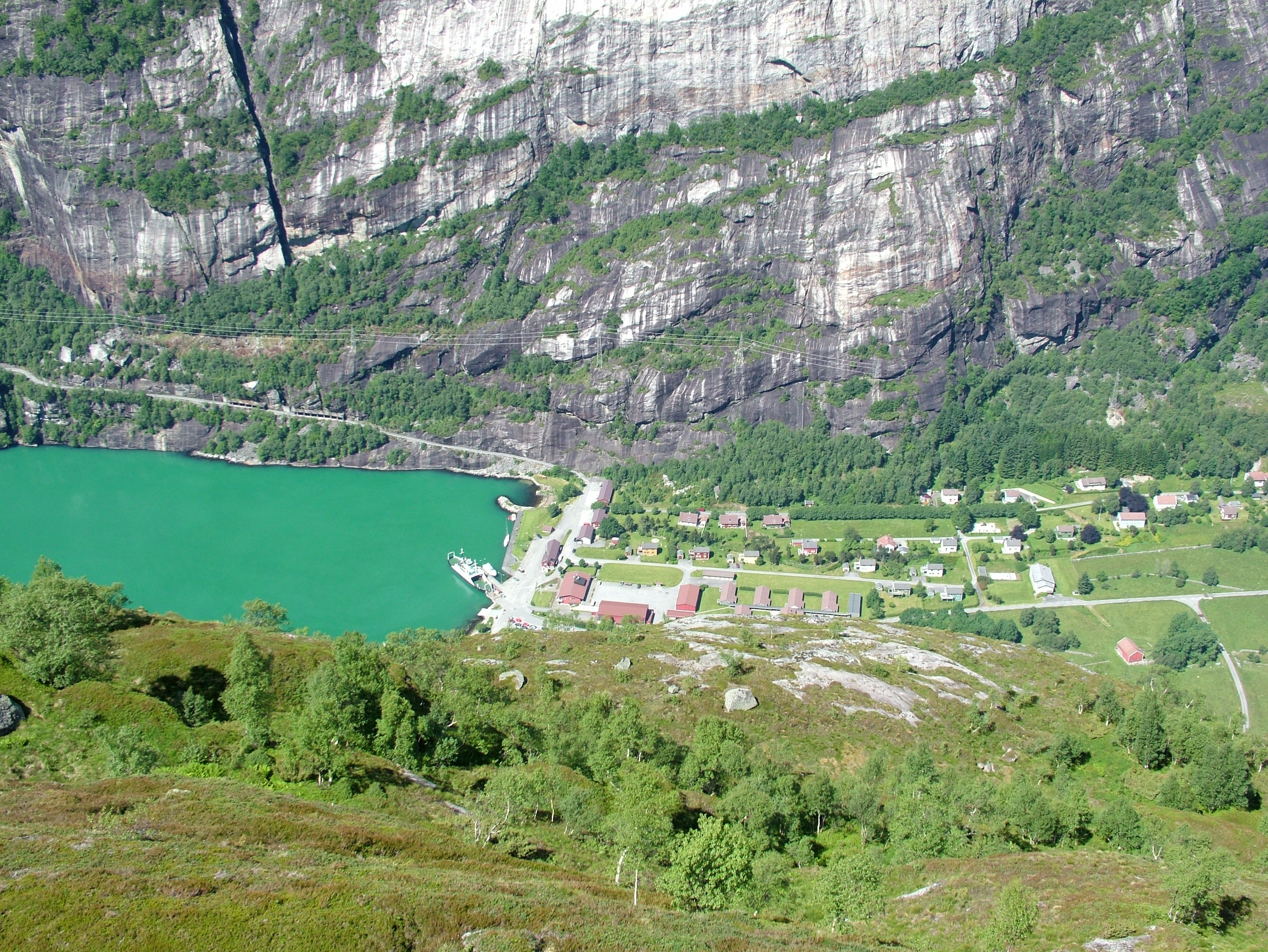
- Lysebotn, located at the head of the Lysefjorden

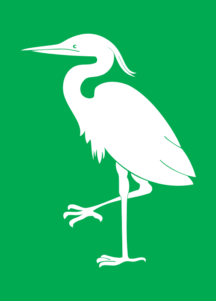
- Flag Coat of arms

- Rogaland within Norway

- Forsand within Rogaland
- Coordinates: 59°00′49″N 06°25′28″E
- Country: Norway
- County: Rogaland
- District: Ryfylke
- Established: 1 Jan 1871
  - Preceded by: Høgsfjord Municipality
- Disestablished: 1 Jan 2020
  - Succeeded by: Sandnes Municipality & Strand Municipality
- Administrative centre: Forsand

Area (upon dissolution)
  - Total: 780.06 km^{2} (301.18 sq mi)
  - Land: 698.83 km^{2} (269.82 sq mi)
  - Water: 81.23 km^{2} (31.36 sq mi) 10.4%
  - Rank: #141 in Norway
- Highest elevation: 1,304 m (4,278 ft)

Population (2019)
  - Total: 1,193
  - Rank: #378 in Norway
  - Density: 1.5/km^{2} (3.9/sq mi)
  - Change (10 years): ▲ +5.2%
- Demonym: Forsandbu

Official language
  - Norwegian form: Nynorsk
- Time zone: UTC+01:00 (CET)
  - Summer (DST): UTC+02:00 (CEST)
- ISO 3166 code: NO-1129

Prior to its dissolution in 2020, the 780.06-square-kilometre (301.18 sq mi) municipality was the 141st largest by area out of the 422 municipalities in Norway. Forsand was the 378th most populous municipality in Norway with a population of about 1,193 in 2019. The municipality's population density was 1.5/km^{2} (3.9/sq mi) and its population had increased by 5.2% over the previous 10-year period. It existed from 1871 until its dissolution in 2020, and was on its dissolution divided between Sandnes and Strand. The area was in the traditional district of Ryfylke.

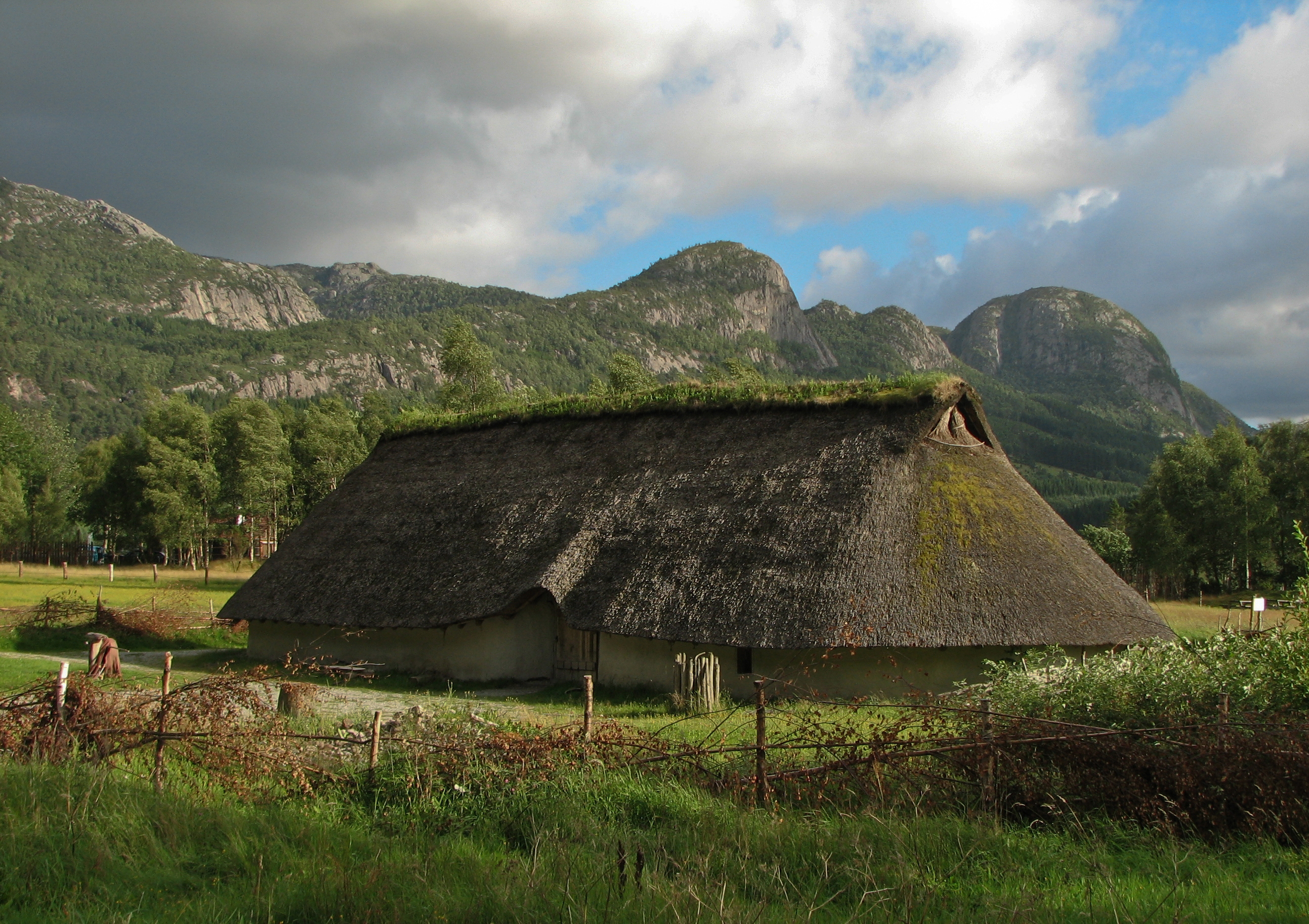
View of a Viking house in the Landa museum in Forsand

The municipality of Fossan was established on 1 January 1871 when the large Høgsfjord Municipality was divided into two: the district located east of the Høgsfjorden (population: 2,081) became the new Fossan Municipality and the remaining parts of Høgsfjord Municipality that were located west of the Høgsfjorden (population: 1,122) changed its name to Høle Municipality.

During the 1960s, there were many municipal mergers across Norway due to the work of the Schei Committee. On 1 January 1965, all of Forsand Municipality located south and east of the Frafjord was transferred to the neighboring Gjesdal Municipality. The reason for this border change was because the southern part of Forsand had no road connection with the rest of Forsand, but it was connected by road to Gjesdal.

On 1 January 2020, Forsand Municipality was dissolved. The area on the northwestern shore of the Lysefjorden around the Preikestolen became a part of the neighboring Strand Municipality and the rest of Forsand became part of Sandnes Municipality.

=== Coat of arms ===
The coat of arms was granted on 11 March 1988. The official blazon is "Vert, a heron vigilant argent" (Norwegian: På grøn grunn ein sølv hegre). This means the arms have a green field (background) and the charge is a heron standing on one leg. The charge has a tincture of argent which means it is commonly colored white, but if it is made out of metal, then silver is used. The green color in the field symbolizes the importance of the local forests and wildlife. The heron was chosen since it is a common bird that lives in the area, from the fjords all the way up into the mountains. The arms were designed by John Digernes. The municipal flag has the same design as the coat of arms.

=== Municipal council ===
The municipality was governed by a municipal council (Kommunestyre) of directly elected representatives. The mayor was indirectly elected by a vote of the municipal council. The municipality was under the jurisdiction of the Ryfylke District Court and the Gulating Court of Appeal.

The council was made up of 17 representatives that were elected to four year terms. The tables below show the historical composition of the council by political party.

Forsand kommunestyre 2015–2019
Party name (in Nynorsk)	Number of representatives
Labour Party (Arbeidarpartiet)	2
Conservative Party (Høgre)	3
Christian Democratic Party (Kristeleg Folkeparti)	4
Centre Party (Senterpartiet)	3
Common list (Samlingslista)	3
Forsand local list (Forsand Bygdalista)	2
Total number of members:	17
Note: On 1 January 2020, Forsand Municipality was divided between Sandnes Municipality and Strand Municipality.

Forsand kommunestyre 2011–2015
Party name (in Nynorsk)	Number of representatives
Labour Party (Arbeidarpartiet)	3
Progress Party (Framstegspartiet)	1
Conservative Party (Høgre)	5
Christian Democratic Party (Kristeleg Folkeparti)	5
Centre Party (Senterpartiet)	3
Total number of members:	17

Forsand kommunestyre 2007–2011
Party name (in Nynorsk)	Number of representatives
Labour Party (Arbeidarpartiet)	2
Progress Party (Framstegspartiet)	2
Conservative Party (Høgre)	4
Christian Democratic Party (Kristeleg Folkeparti)	5
Centre Party (Senterpartiet)	4
Total number of members:	17

Forsand kommunestyre 2003–2007
Party name (in Nynorsk)	Number of representatives
Labour Party (Arbeidarpartiet)	2
Progress Party (Framstegspartiet)	2
Conservative Party (Høgre)	4
Christian Democratic Party (Kristeleg Folkeparti)	5
Centre Party (Senterpartiet)	4
Total number of members:	17

Forsand kommunestyre 1999–2003
Party name (in Nynorsk)	Number of representatives
Labour Party (Arbeidarpartiet)	3
Conservative Party (Høgre)	3
Christian Democratic Party (Kristeleg Folkeparti)	4
Centre Party (Senterpartiet)	4
Common list (Samlingslista)	3
Total number of members:	17

Forsand kommunestyre 1995–1999
Party name (in Nynorsk)	Number of representatives
Labour Party (Arbeidarpartiet)	2
Conservative Party (Høgre)	2
Christian Democratic Party (Kristeleg Folkeparti)	5
Centre Party (Senterpartiet)	6
Common list (Samlingslista)	2
Total number of members:	17

Forsand kommunestyre 1991–1995
Party name (in Nynorsk)	Number of representatives
Labour Party (Arbeidarpartiet)	3
Conservative Party (Høgre)	1
Christian Democratic Party (Kristeleg Folkeparti)	5
Centre Party (Senterpartiet)	6
Common list (Samlingslista)	2
Total number of members:	17

Forsand kommunestyre 1987–1991
Party name (in Nynorsk)	Number of representatives
Labour Party (Arbeidarpartiet)	2
Conservative Party (Høgre)	2
Christian Democratic Party (Kristeleg Folkeparti)	6
Centre Party (Senterpartiet)	4
Local list (Bygdalista)	1
Common list (Samlingslista)	2
Total number of members:	17

Forsand kommunestyre 1983–1987
Party name (in Nynorsk)	Number of representatives
Labour Party (Arbeidarpartiet)	2
Conservative Party (Høgre)	5
Christian Democratic Party (Kristeleg Folkeparti)	4
Centre Party (Senterpartiet)	4
Local list (Bygdelista)	2
Total number of members:	17

Forsand kommunestyre 1979–1983
Party name (in Nynorsk)	Number of representatives
Conservative Party (Høgre)	5
Christian Democratic Party (Kristeleg Folkeparti)	4
Centre Party (Senterpartiet)	2
Local list (Bygdeliste)	4
Common list (Samlingsliste)	2
Total number of members:	17

Forsand kommunestyre 1975–1979
Party name (in Nynorsk)	Number of representatives
Labour Party (Arbeidarpartiet)	1
Christian Democratic Party (Kristeleg Folkeparti)	7
Centre Party (Senterpartiet)	5
Non-political local list (Upolitisk Bygdelist)	4
Total number of members:	17

Forsand kommunestyre 1971–1975
Party name (in Nynorsk)	Number of representatives
Labour Party (Arbeidarpartiet)	1
Local List(s) (Lokale lister)	14
Total number of members:	15

Forsand kommunestyre 1967–1971
Party name (in Nynorsk)	Number of representatives
Labour Party (Arbeidarpartiet)	2
Local List(s) (Lokale lister)	13
Total number of members:	15

Forsand kommunestyre 1963–1967
Party name (in Nynorsk)	Number of representatives
Labour Party (Arbeidarpartiet)	2
Local List(s) (Lokale lister)	15
Total number of members:	17

Forsand heradsstyre 1959–1963
Party name (in Nynorsk)	Number of representatives
Labour Party (Arbeidarpartiet)	2
Local List(s) (Lokale lister)	15
Total number of members:	17

Forsand heradsstyre 1955–1959
Party name (in Nynorsk)	Number of representatives
Labour Party (Arbeidarpartiet)	2
Liberal Party (Venstre)	3
Local List(s) (Lokale lister)	12
Total number of members:	17

Forsand heradsstyre 1951–1955
Party name (in Nynorsk)	Number of representatives
Labour Party (Arbeidarpartiet)	2
Local List(s) (Lokale lister)	14
Total number of members:	16

Forsand heradsstyre 1947–1951
Party name (in Nynorsk)	Number of representatives
Labour Party (Arbeidarpartiet)	2
Local List(s) (Lokale lister)	14
Total number of members:	16

Forsand heradsstyre 1945–1947
Party name (in Nynorsk)	Number of representatives
List of workers, fishermen, and small farmholders (Arbeidarar, fiskarar, småbrukarar liste)	3
Local List(s) (Lokale lister)	13
Total number of members:	16

Forsand heradsstyre 1937–1941*
Party name (in Nynorsk)	Number of representatives
Labour Party (Arbeidarpartiet)	2
Joint List(s) of Non-Socialist Parties (Borgarlege Felleslister)	14
Total number of members:	16
Note: Due to the German occupation of Norway during World War II, no elections were held for new municipal councils until after the war ended in 1945.

==== Mayors ====
The mayor (Nynorsk: ordførar) of Forsand Municipality was the political leader of the municipality and the chairperson of the municipal council. The following people have held this position:

- 1871–1879: Osmund Guttormsen Espedal
- 1880–1881: Knud Olsen Moluf
- 1882–1885: Osmund Guttormsen Espedal
- 1886–1887: Rasmus Ingebrigtsen Norland
- 1888–1889: Thormod Schavland
- 1890–1893: Rasmus Ingebrigtsen Nordland
- 1894–1895: Thormod Schavland
- 1896–1897: Børge T. Kommedal
- 1898–1899: Tore T. Haaland
- 1901–1910: Rasmus I. Norland
- 1911–1913: Ingebret R. Norland
- 1914–1916: Rasmus I. Norland
- 1917–1918: Torvald O. Espedal
- 1918–1919: Rasmus J. Dirdal
- 1920–1922: Ingebret R. Norland
- 1923–1940: Torgeir Espedal
- 1941–1941: Torstein I. Fossan
- 1945–1947: Torgeir Espedal
- 1948–1958: Peter Norland
- 1958–1961: Torstein I. Fossan
- 1962–1965: Alf T. Espedal (LL)
- 1966–1967: Tormod Harboe
- 1968–1971: Alf T. Espedal
- 1972–1978: Tormod Rossavik (KrF)
- 1978–1983: Per Fløysvik (KrF)
- 1984–1989: Årstein Løland (Sp)
- 1990–1991: Torstein Haukalid (KrF)
- 1992–1999: Fridtjov Thorsen Norland (Sp)
- 1999–2003: Torstein Haukalid (KrF)
- 2003–2007: Ingeborg Søyland (Sp)
- 2007–2015: Ole Tom Guse (KrF)
- 2015–2019: Bjarte S. Dagestad (H)

== See also ==
- List of former municipalities of Norway
