= Preikestolen =

Cliff and tourist attraction in Norway

- Prekestolen
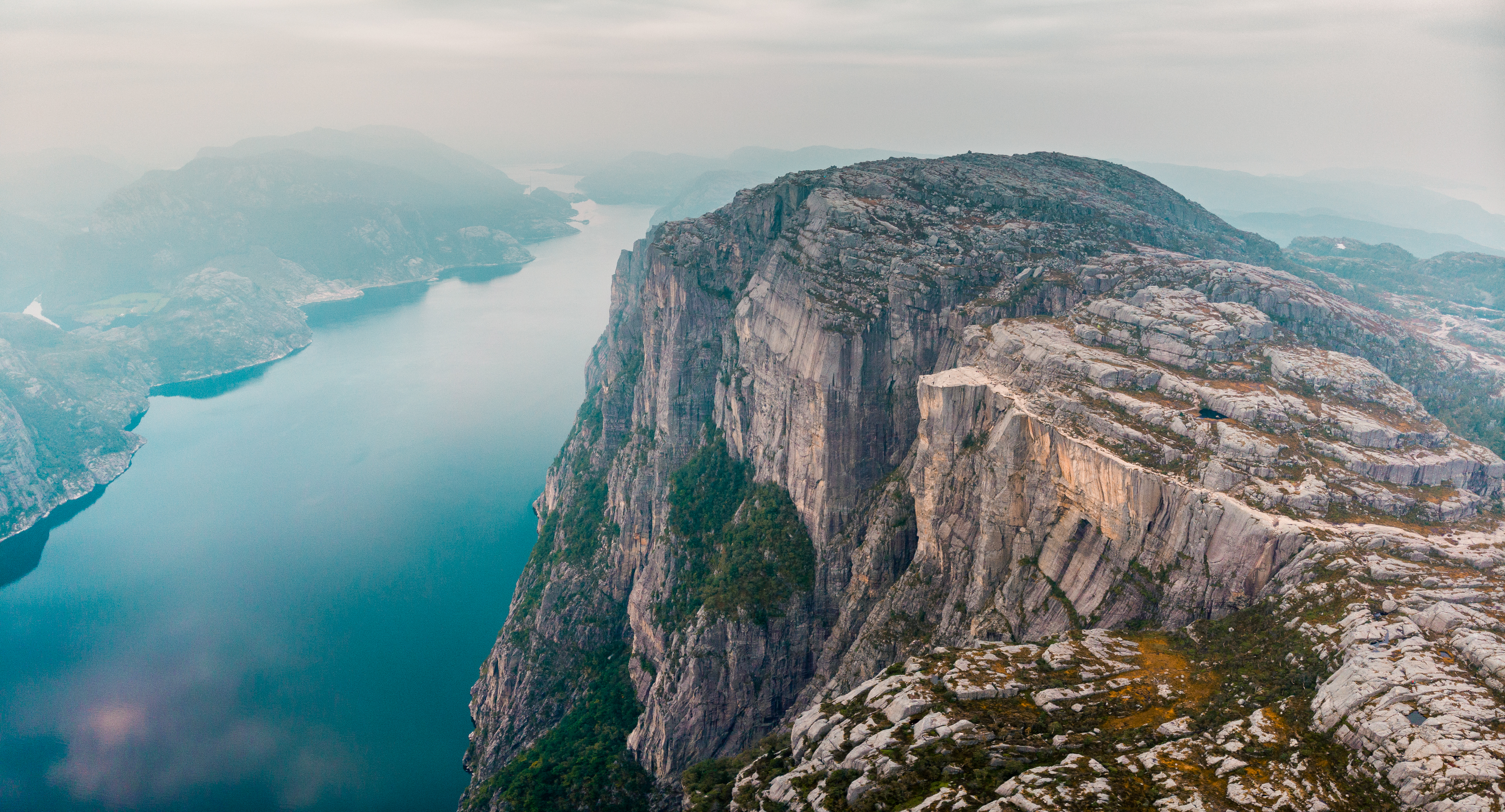
- Preikestolen overlooking Lysefjorden

Highest point
- Elevation: 604 m (1,982 ft)
- Coordinates: 58.98666°N 6.18748°E

Geography
- Location: Rogaland, Norway
- Topo map: 1313 III Lyngsvatnet

Geology
- Mountain type: Granite

Preikestolen or Prekestolen (English: 'Pulpit Rock' or 'Pulpit') is a tourist attraction in Strand Municipality in Rogaland county, Norway. Preikestolen is a steep cliff which rises 604 metres (1,982 ft) above Lysefjorden. Atop the cliff, there is an almost flat top of approximately 25 by 25 metres (82 ft × 82 ft). Preikestolen is located near the western part of the fjord, and on its north side.

Tourism at the site has been increasing in the early 21st century, with 300,000 visitors in 2024, making it one of the most-visited natural tourist attractions in Norway. BASE jumpers often leap from the cliff. Due to its increased popularity, the most used path to the site (a 3.8-kilometre (2.4 mi) long hike) was improved by Nepalese Sherpas in 2013.

== Name ==
The old local name of the site is Hyvlatonnå; English: (woodworker's) Plane's Tooth. The name Prekestolen (without the i) was coined around the year 1900 when the local tourist organisation, Stavanger Turistforening, wanted to promote the site for trekking. The "i" was added later to concord with Nynorsk, the official local form of Norwegian, and the site is now known both locally and officially as "Preikestolen."

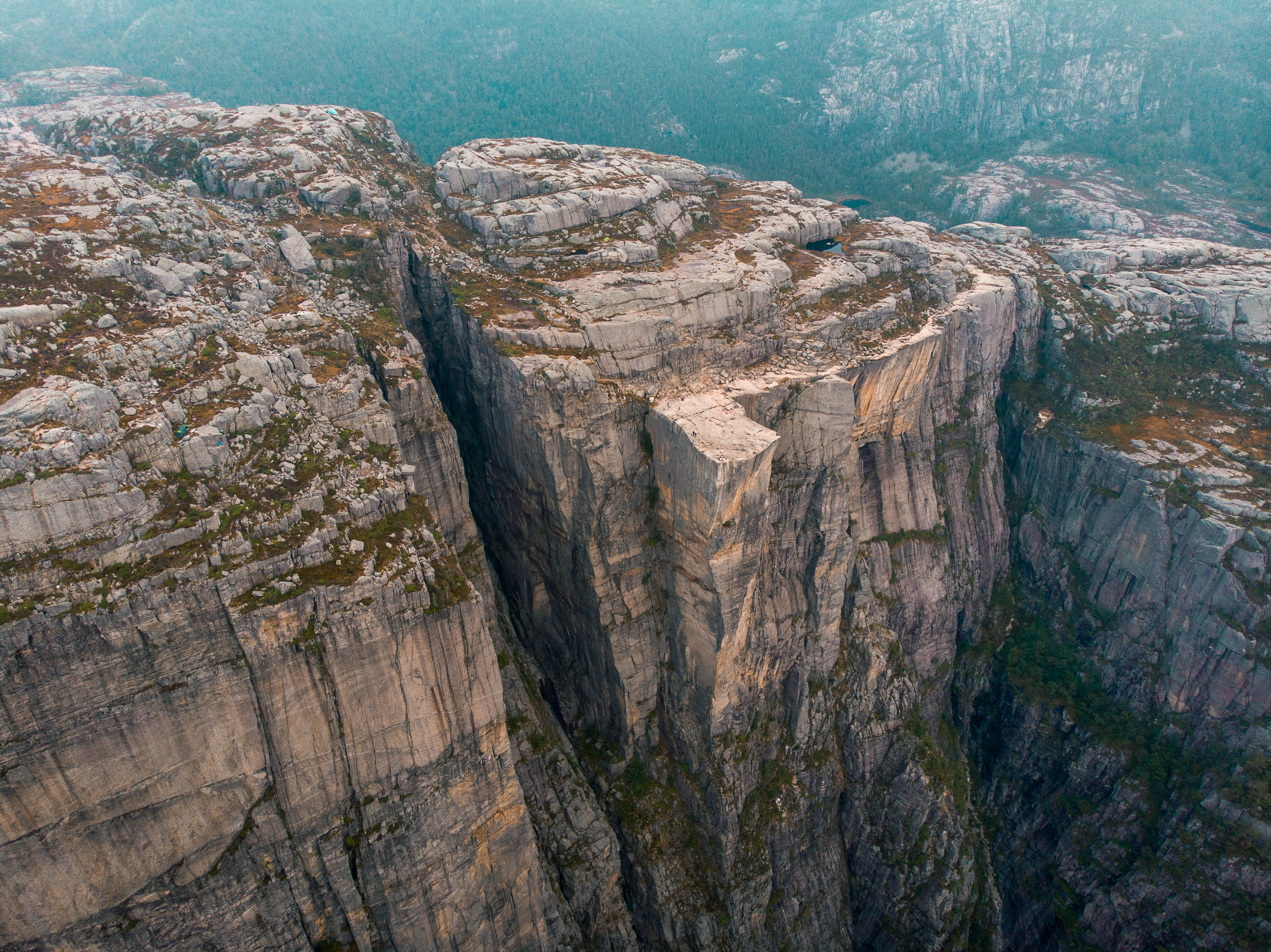
Preikestolen

== Access ==
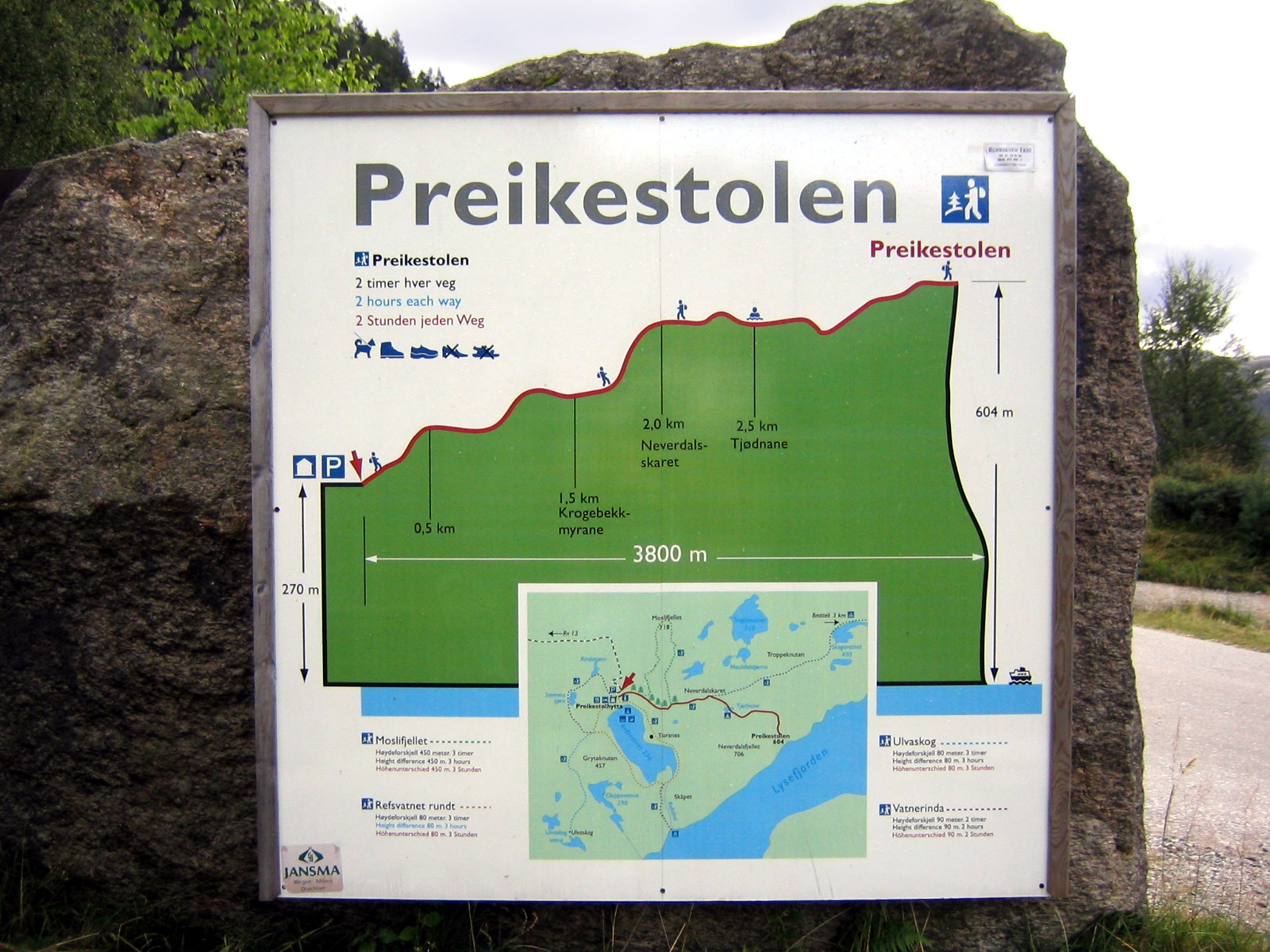
Trail map and profile

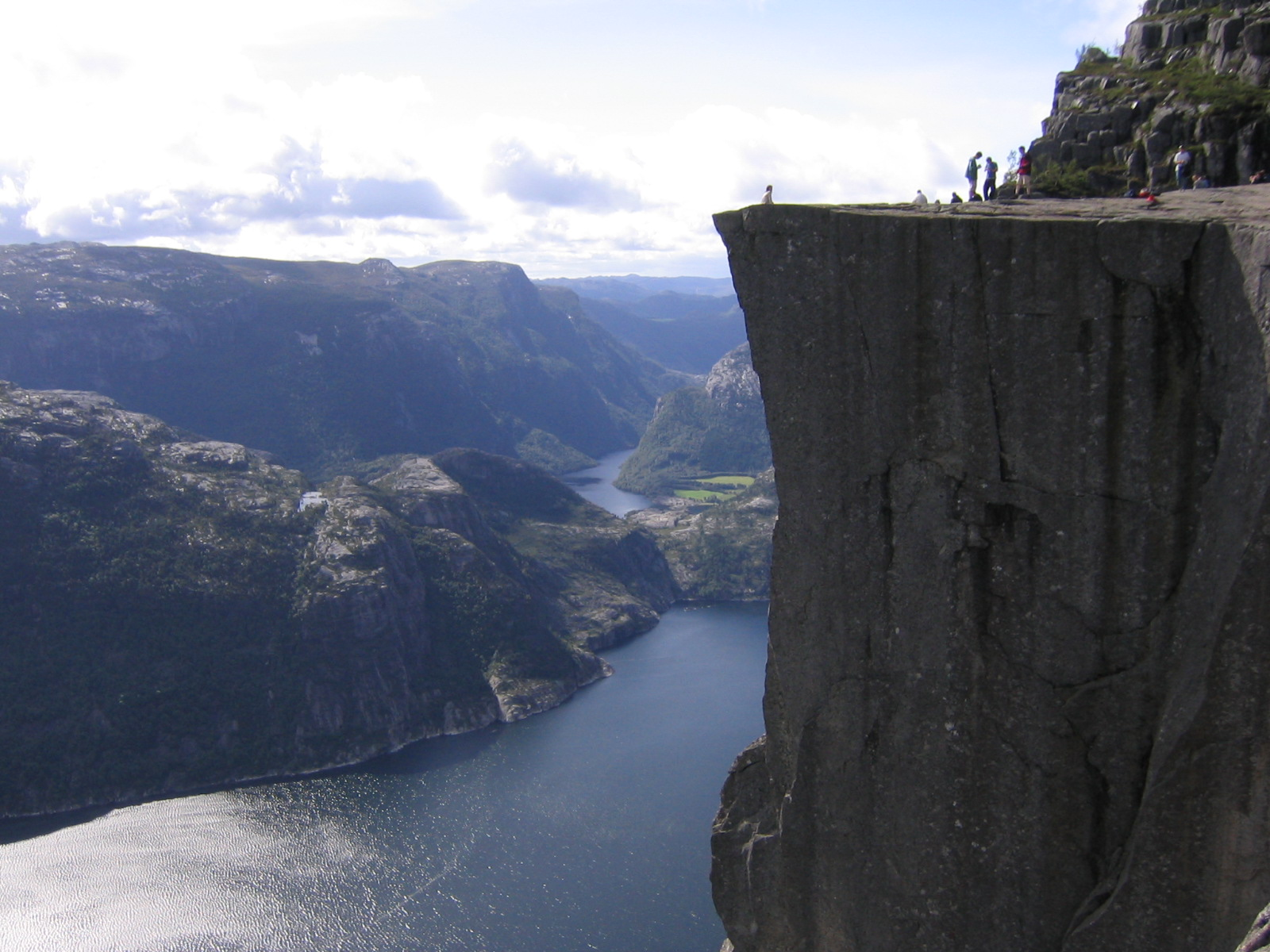
Preikestolen

Preikestolen is located in the southern part of the Ryfylke district in Rogaland county in Western Norway. The city of Stavanger, the fourth largest in Norway, with a number of direct flights to/from European cities, is located 25 kilometres (16 mi) from the site. The parking facility for Preikestolen is located, thanks to the April 2020 opening of underwater tunnel Ryfylketunnelen, about 40 minutes from Stavanger by car.

Access to Preikestolen from Stavanger is via the Norwegian National Road 13 (Rv13). From the south, it is possible to drive to the Preikestolen parking facility via the ferry from Lauvvika to Oanes. Ferries run year-round, but have limited hours, so visitors must plan ahead if opting for ferry over tunnel.

The road to the site ends at a parking facility at the Preikestolen Fjellstue, just south of the town of Jørpeland in Strand Municipality. From the parking lot, there is a trail to the site. A round-trip hike to Preikestolen from the closest car park takes about 3–4 hours for someone of average fitness.

The walk to Preikestolen is very steep in places. The path starts at the Preikestolhytta, at an elevation of approximately 270 metres (890 ft) above sea level, and climbs to 604 metres (1,982 ft). The walk takes 2–3 hours depending on traffic along the trail, experience, and fitness level. Even though the elevation differential is only 334 metres (1,096 ft) and the walk is not particularly long, about 3.8 kilometres (2.4 mi) each way, the total elevation gain and loss over the course of the hike is more than one might initially expect, as the path climbs and descends various ridges. The walk is more difficult in winter and spring when there is snow and ice. Due to snow, it is not always possible to do the hike to the top in the winter.

Alternative access is available via a path from Bratteli – a stop for the tourist ferry from Lauvvik to Lysebotn that passes beneath the Pulpit Rock. This walk is more demanding, and takes 4–5 hours each way.

An alternative is to sail through the Lysefjorden, with trips running year-round. Outside of summer, the weather may be wet and cold, and clouds may obstruct views of the cliff. The ship stops at several small docks on the way in and out, including a layover at the end of the Lysefjorden at the village of Lysebotn.

=== Improvement project ===
In early April 2013, a project started to improve the path up to Preikestolen as the old one was so small that it often caused "delays", and at some points on the path it was sometimes impossible to get through. By 2016 the path was completed.

In 2019 a new project started to further improve paths, build a new website, and improve the signs along the path.

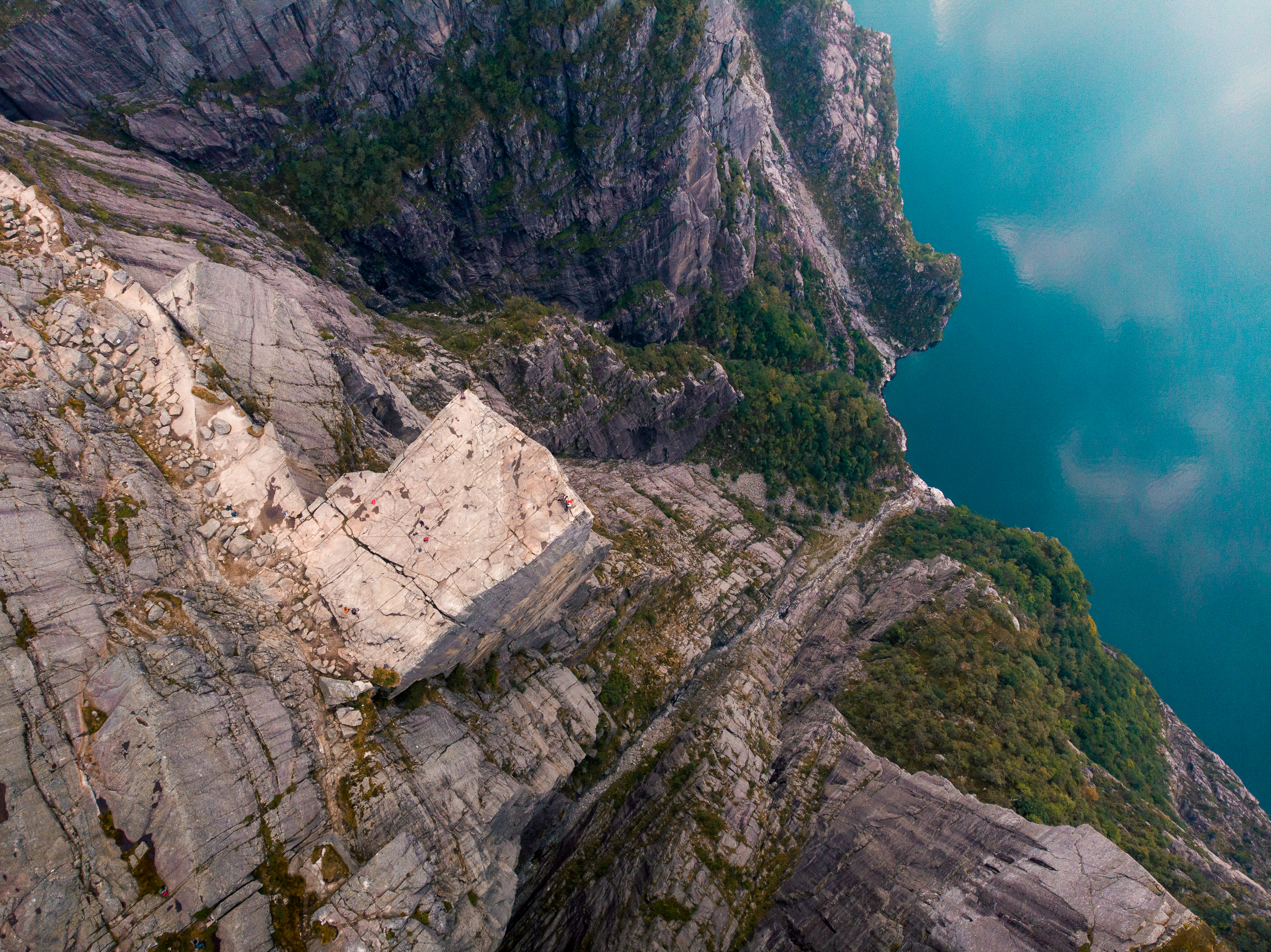
Top view of Preikestolen

=== Safety ===
The authorities have opted not to install fencing or other safety devices as they felt it would detract from the site and the fact that fatalities at the site are extremely rare, despite having hundreds of thousands of visitors each year. Furthermore, there were concerns that fences or other devices might encourage dangerous behavior such as climbing onto the fences. Norwegian authorities have stated that "we cannot fence in all nature in this country".

== Nature ==
=== Geology ===
The cliff was formed during the Last Glacial Period, approximately 10,000 years ago, when the edges of the glacier reached the cliff. The water from the glacier froze in the crevices of the mountain and eventually broke off large, angular blocks, which were later carried away with the glacier. This is the cause of the angular shape of the plateau. Along the plateau itself there continues to be a deep crack. Due to these cracks, the plateau will at some point fall down, but all the geological investigations have revealed that this will not happen in the foreseeable future, and geologists have confirmed the safety of the plateau.

=== Climate ===
Along the fjord there is a mild and humid coastal climate.

=== Surrounding landscape ===
The cliff overlooks the valleys of the Ryfylke region. The mountains surrounding the cliff reach heights of up to 843 metres (2,766 ft). Some of the hilltops have plains which are interspersed with lakes.

Nearby, close to the end of the Lysefjord, is the 1,110-metre (3,642 ft) tall mountain Kjerag which is also a hiking destination. Some tourists elect to forgo trips to Preikestolen and go to Kjerag instead.

== In popular culture ==
- A granite sculpture of the cliff was erected in the town Langeskov in Denmark to commemorate its twin town of Forsand Municipality.
- In the final scene of the final episode of the second season of Vikings the main character, Ragnar Lothbrok, is seen sitting atop Preikestolen.
- Compressed air from Lysefjorden/Preikestolen is being sold in cans, mostly to China.
- The final fight scene (from 2h:10m to 2h:15m) in Mission: Impossible – Fallout features Tom Cruise and Henry Cavill hanging from the face of the cliff at Preikestolen, although in the movie it is supposed to be in Indian-administered Kashmir, now administered by India as Laddakh union territory.
- A movie song called Amali thumali (from 00:00m to 1:30m) from the 2011 blockbuster Tamil-language movie Ko features the lead couples dancing on the top of the cliff at Preikestolen.

== Gallery ==
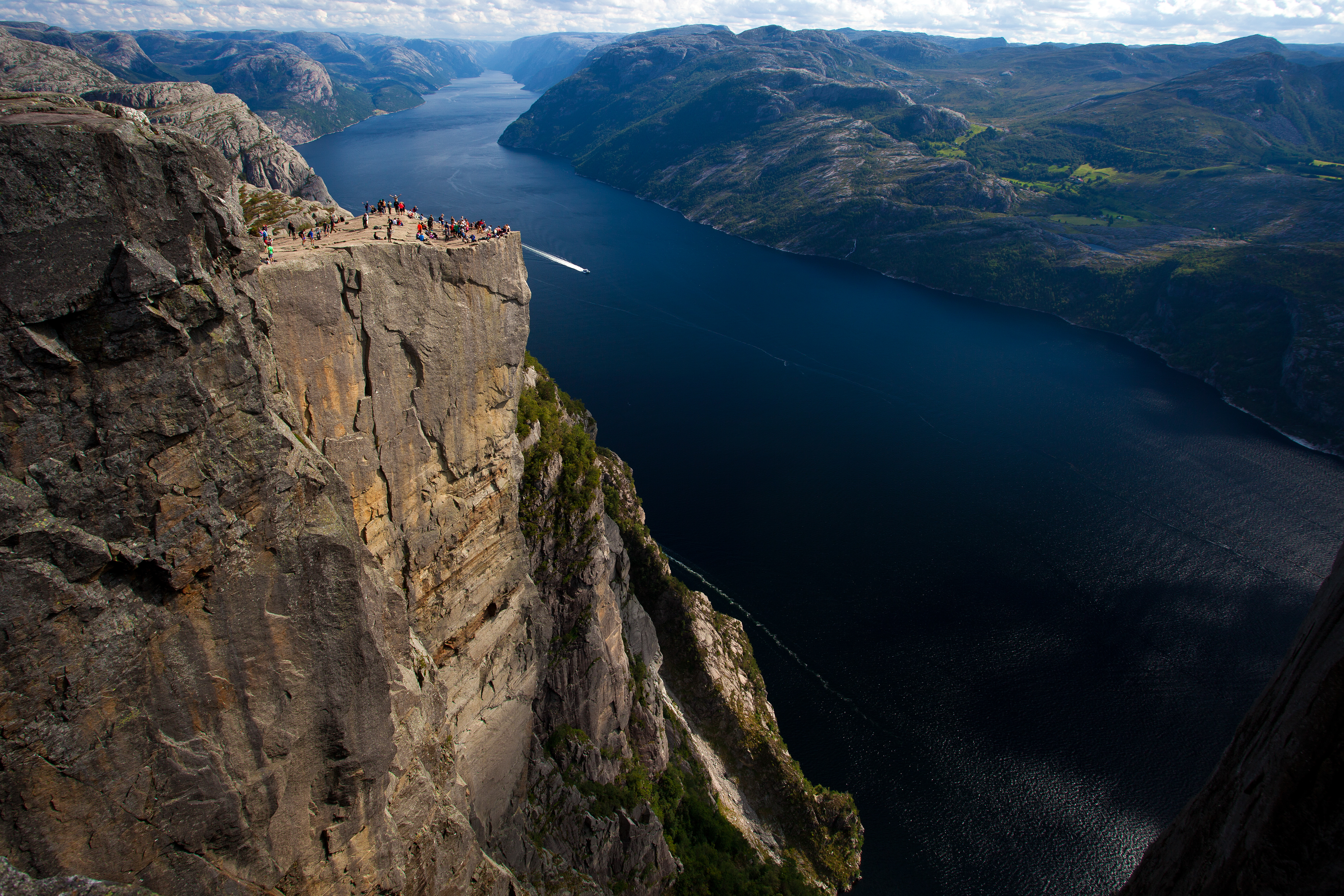
Preikestolen above the Lysefjord.

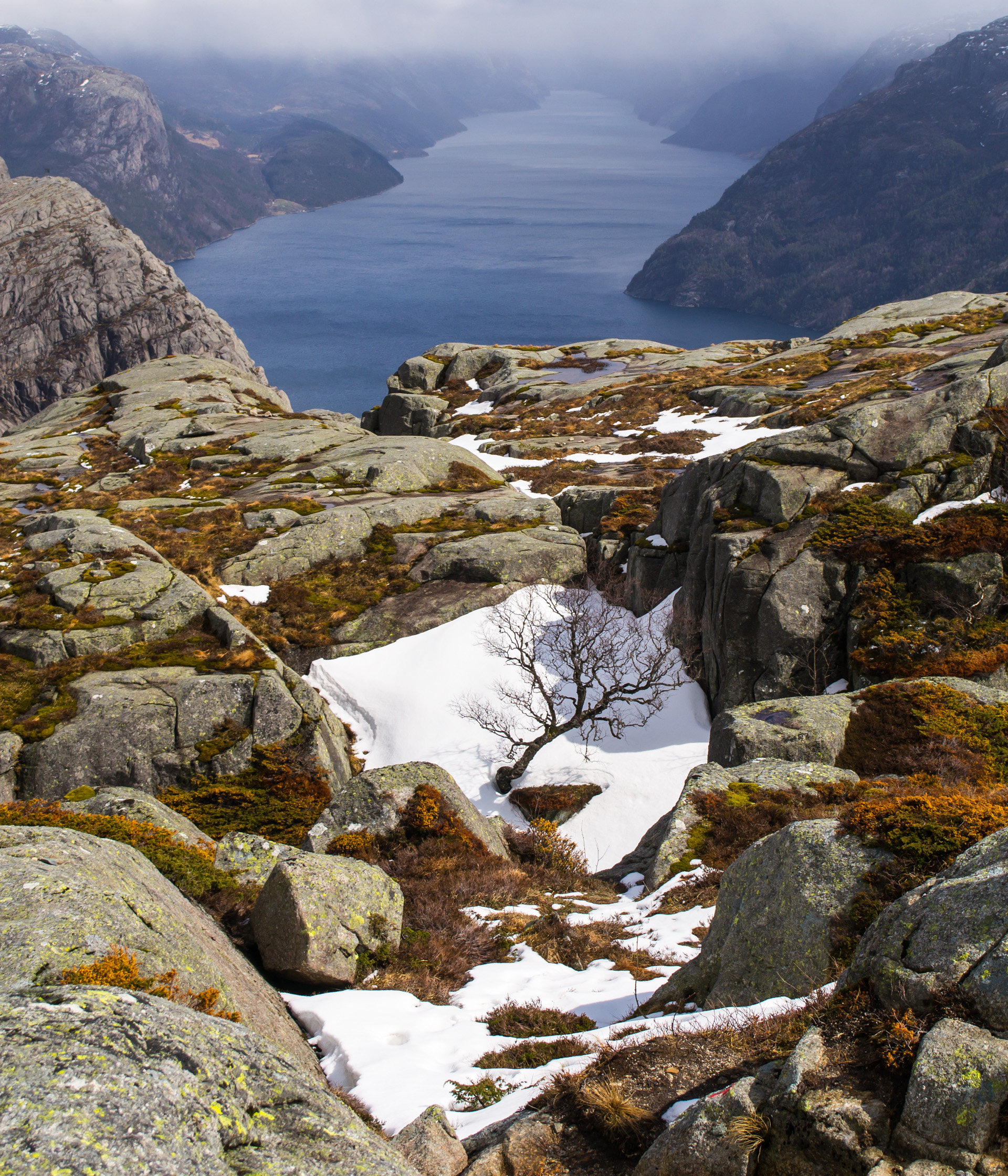
Lysefjord seen from the top of the Preikestolen hill

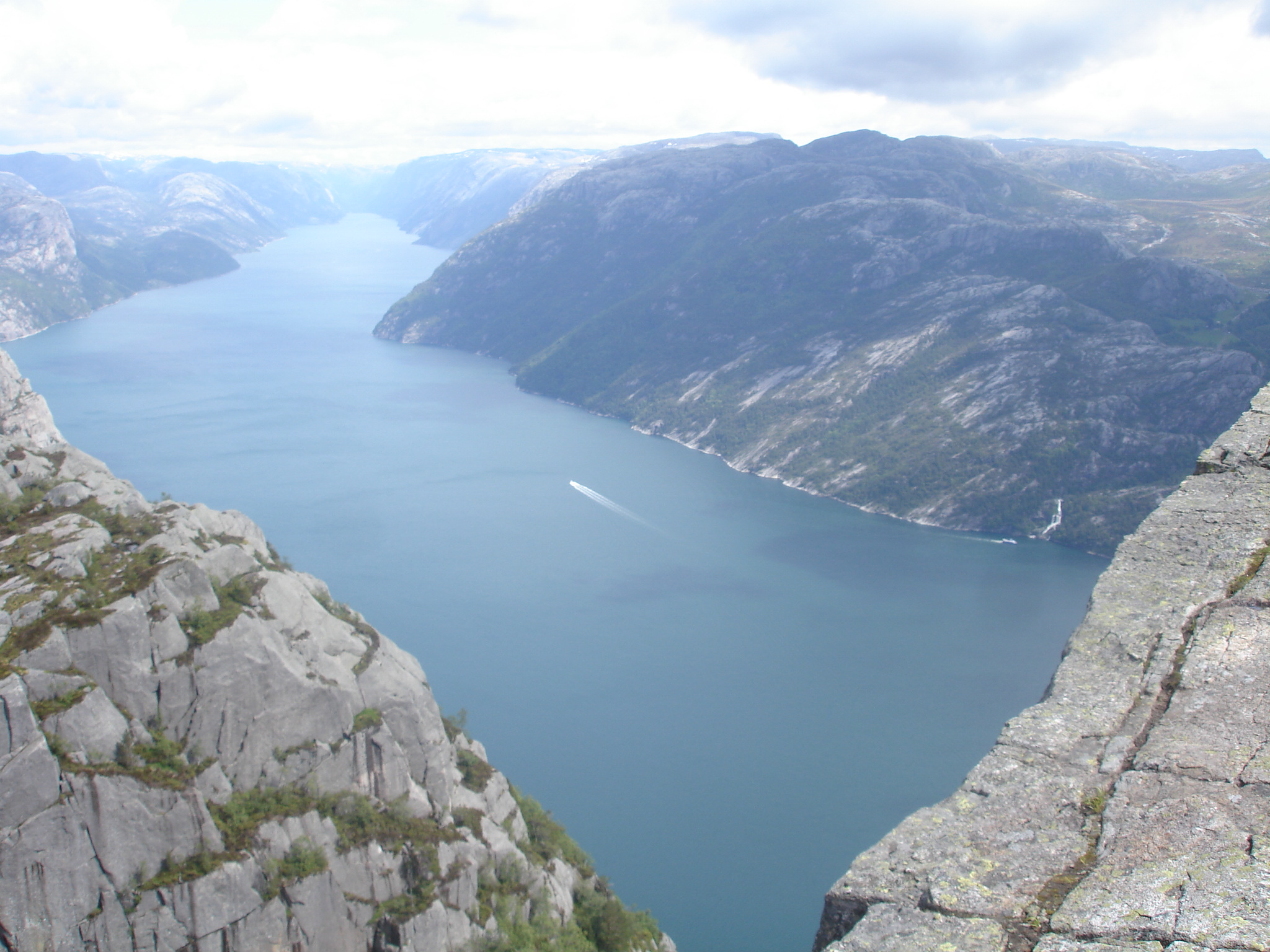
View from Preikestolen, Lysefjorden below

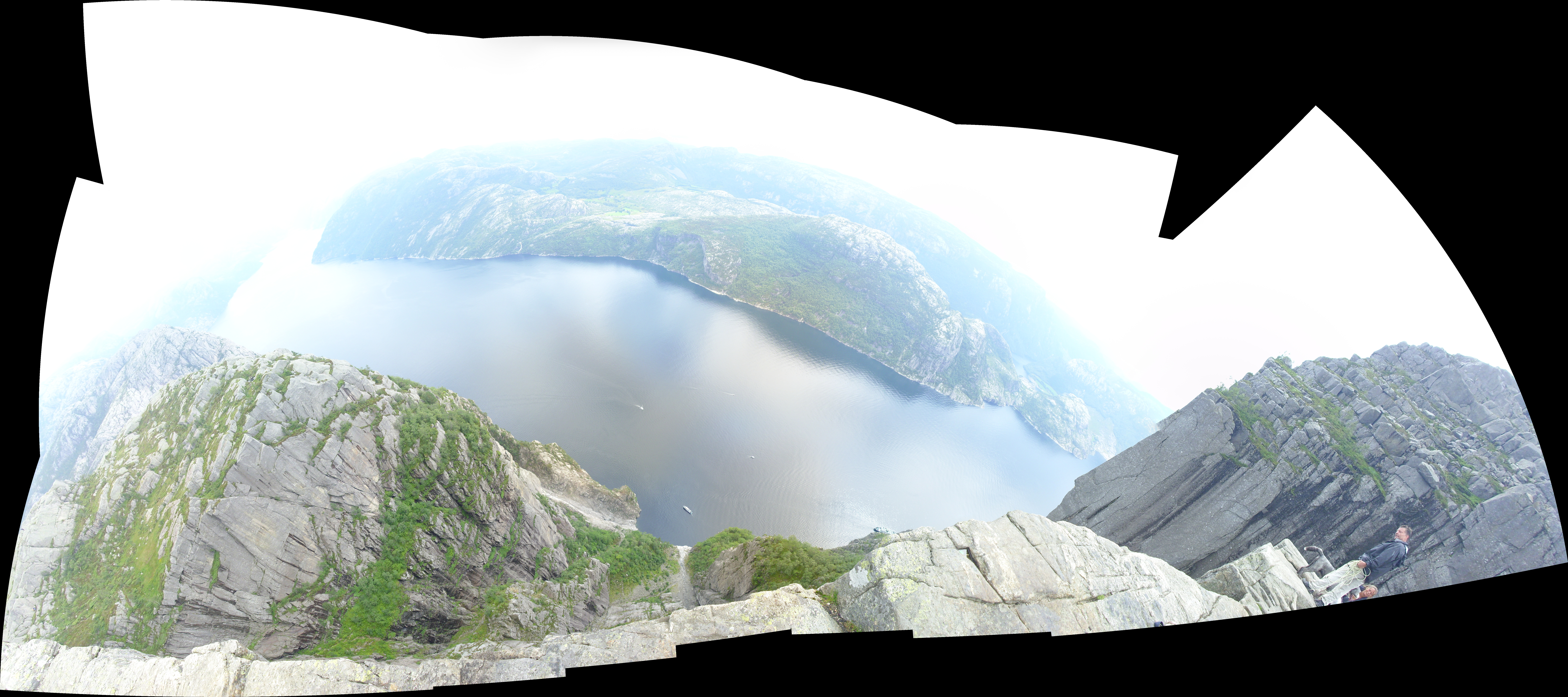
Panoramic view from Preikestolen on Lysefjorden

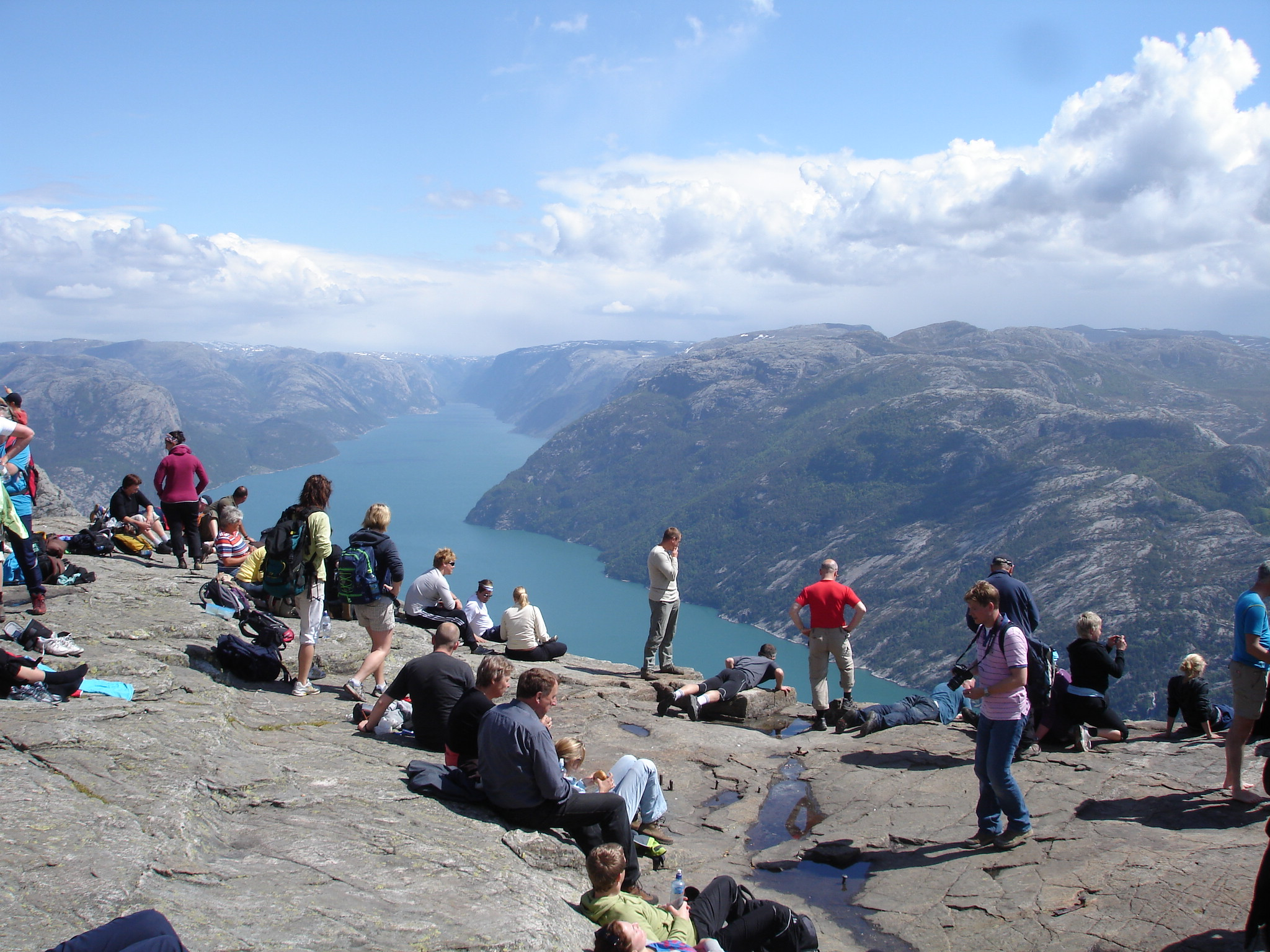
On top of Preikestolen, June 2009

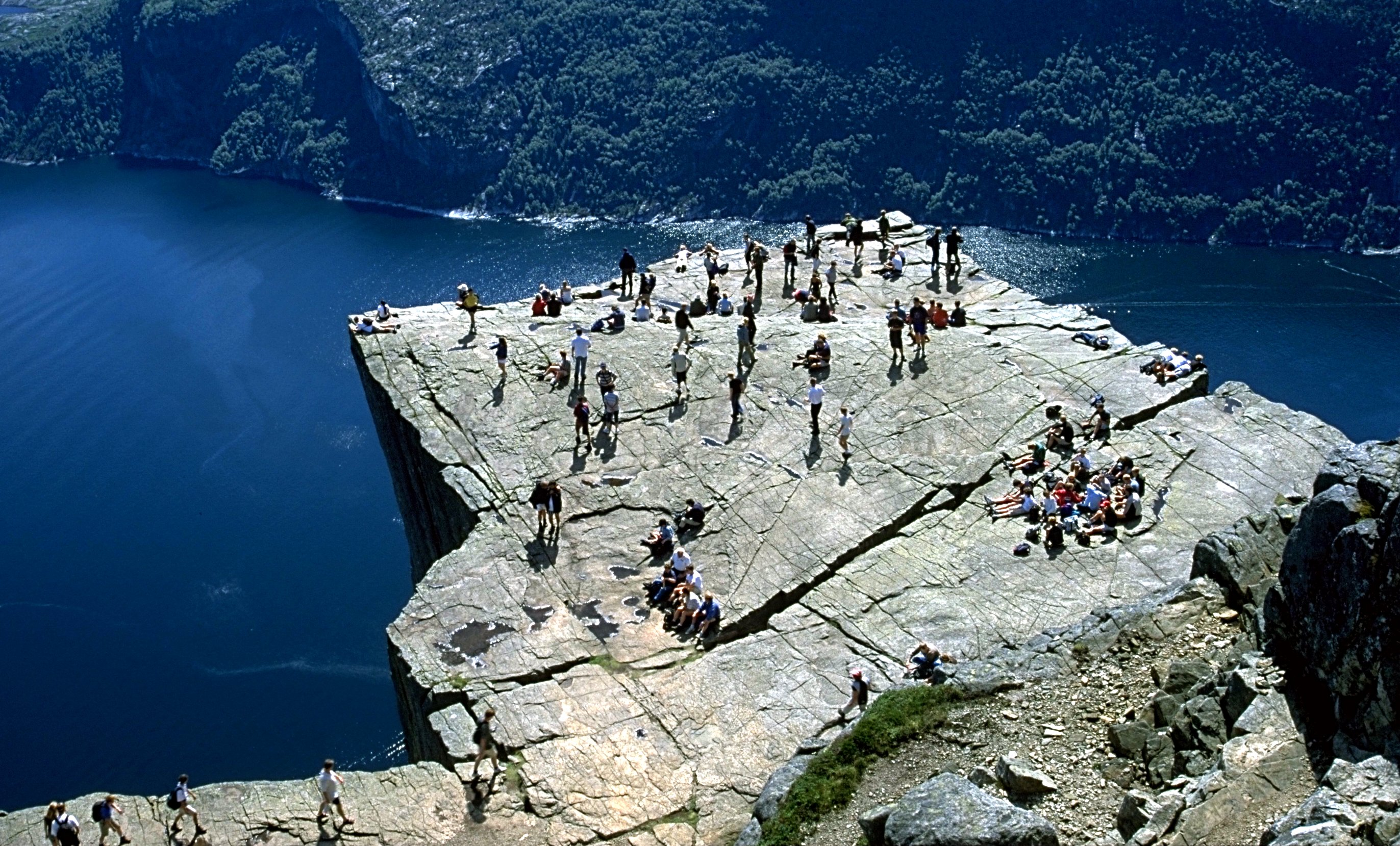
Preikestolen and surrounding area

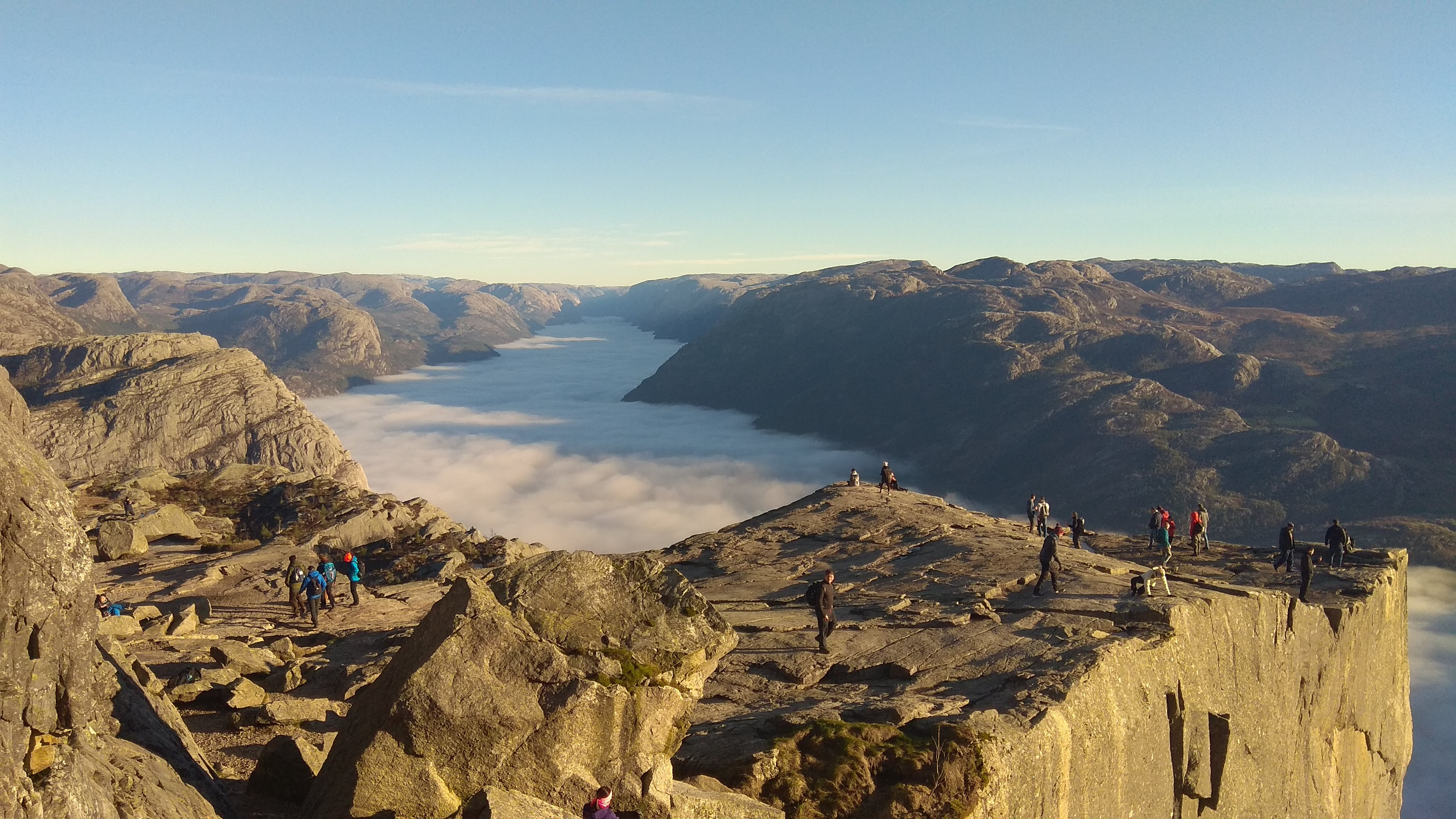
Preikestolen in late November 2018, Lysefjord under a mist

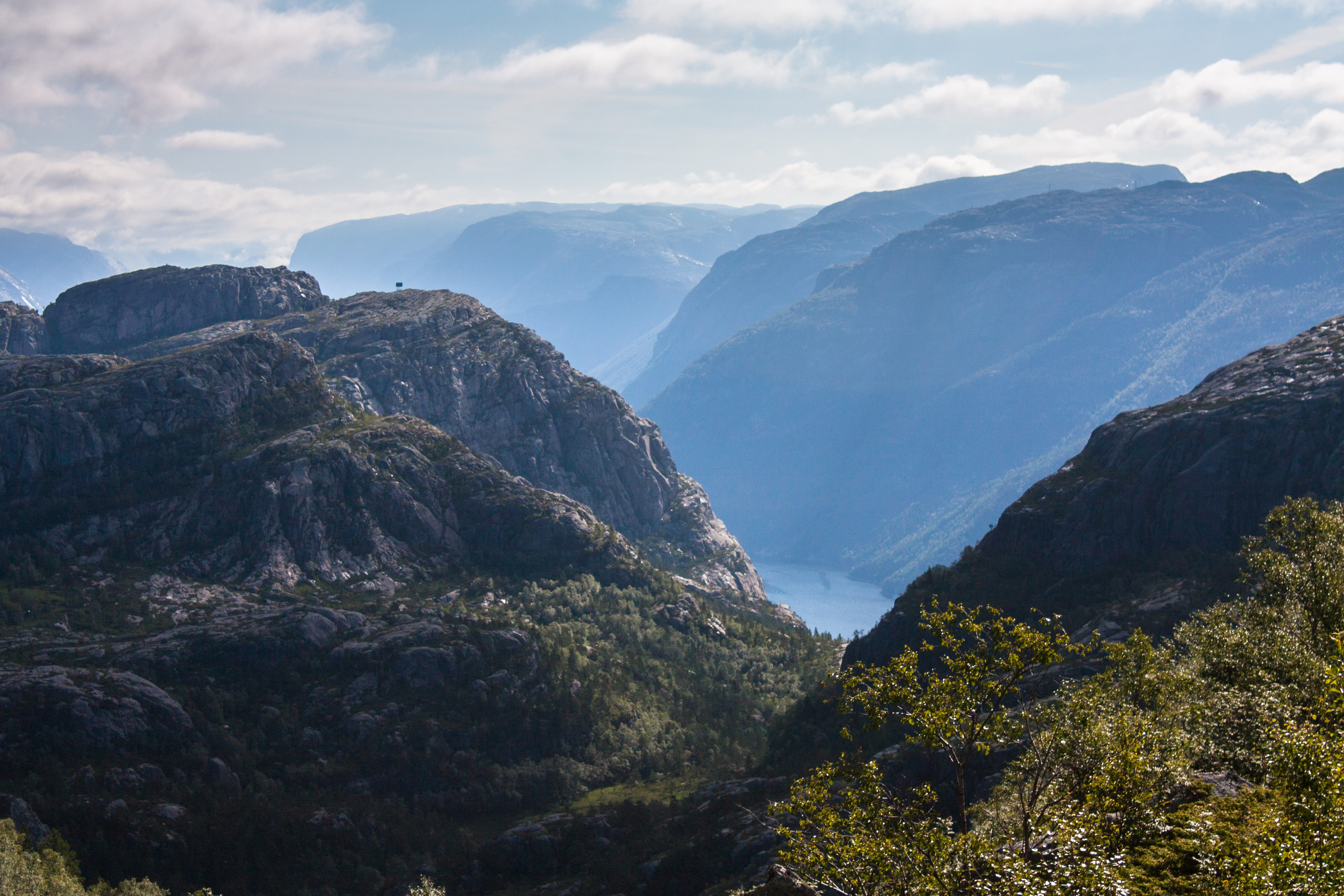
View from the foot path

== See also ==
- Besseggen
- De syv søstre
- Kjerag
- Kjeragbolten
- Trollgaren
- Trollstigen
- Trolltunga
- Trollveggen
- List of waterfalls
