= Forsand (village) =

Village in Sandnes Municipality, Norway

- Village
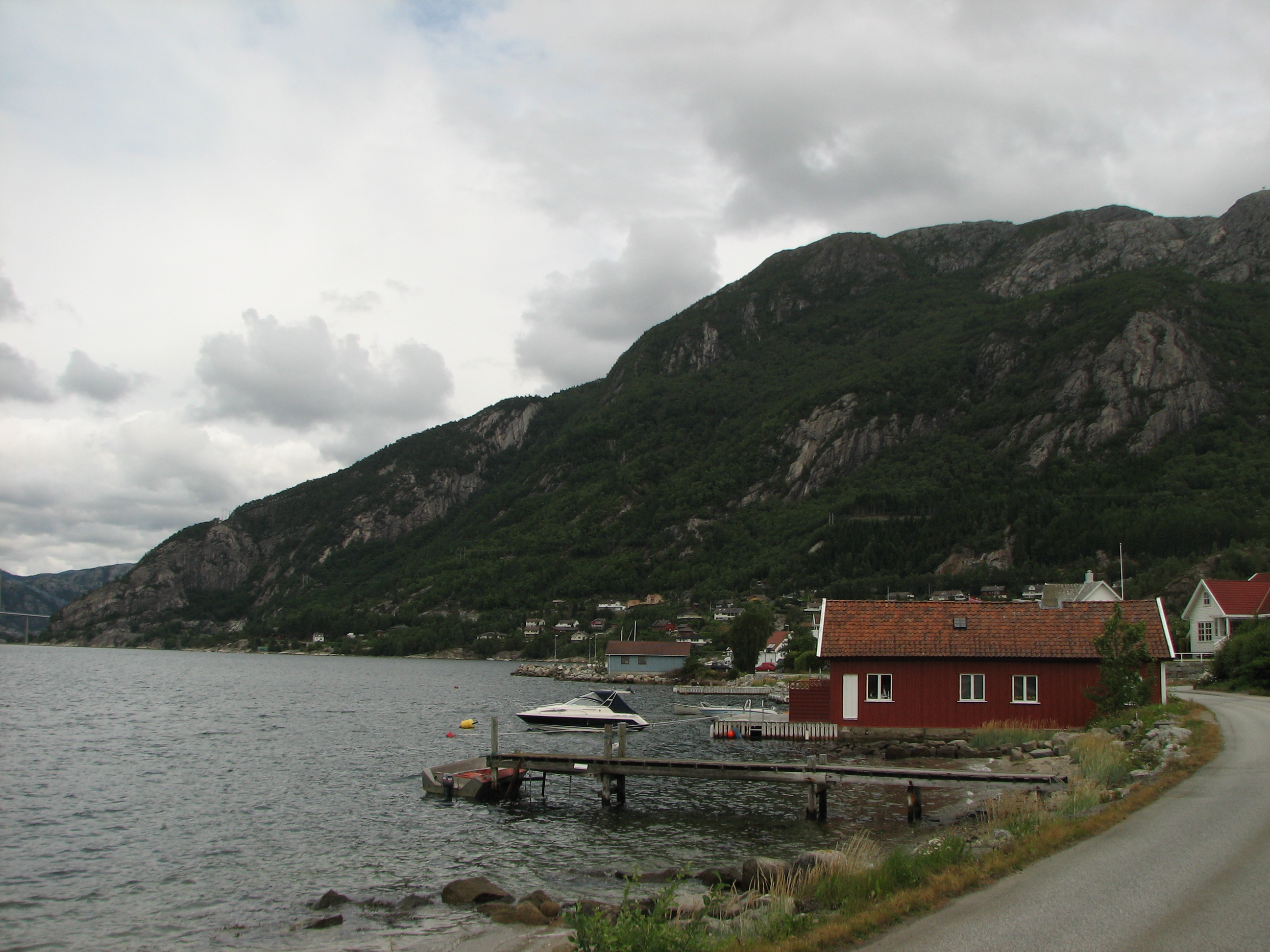
- View of the village coastline
- Interactive map of Forsand
- Coordinates: 58.9033°N 6.10478°E
- Country: Norway
- Region: Western Norway
- County: Rogaland
- District: Ryfylke
- Municipality: Sandnes Municipality

Area
  - Total: 0.81 km^{2} (0.31 sq mi)
- Elevation: 41 m (135 ft)

Population (2025)
  - Total: 559
  - Density: 690/km^{2} (1,800/sq mi)
- Time zone: UTC+01:00 (CET)
  - Summer (DST): UTC+02:00 (CEST)
- Post Code: 4110 Forsand

Forsand is a village in the burough of Forsand in Sandnes, Norway. The village is located along the Høgsfjord, at the mouth of the 42-kilometre (26 mi) long Lysefjord, on the southern side of the fjord. The Lysefjord Bridge is located just northeast of the village and it crosses the Lysefjorden, connecting it to the small village of Oanes which sits on the north side of the fjord. The village of Høle is located across the Høgsfjorden to the west. Høle is connected to Forsand-Oanes by a regular ferry connection.

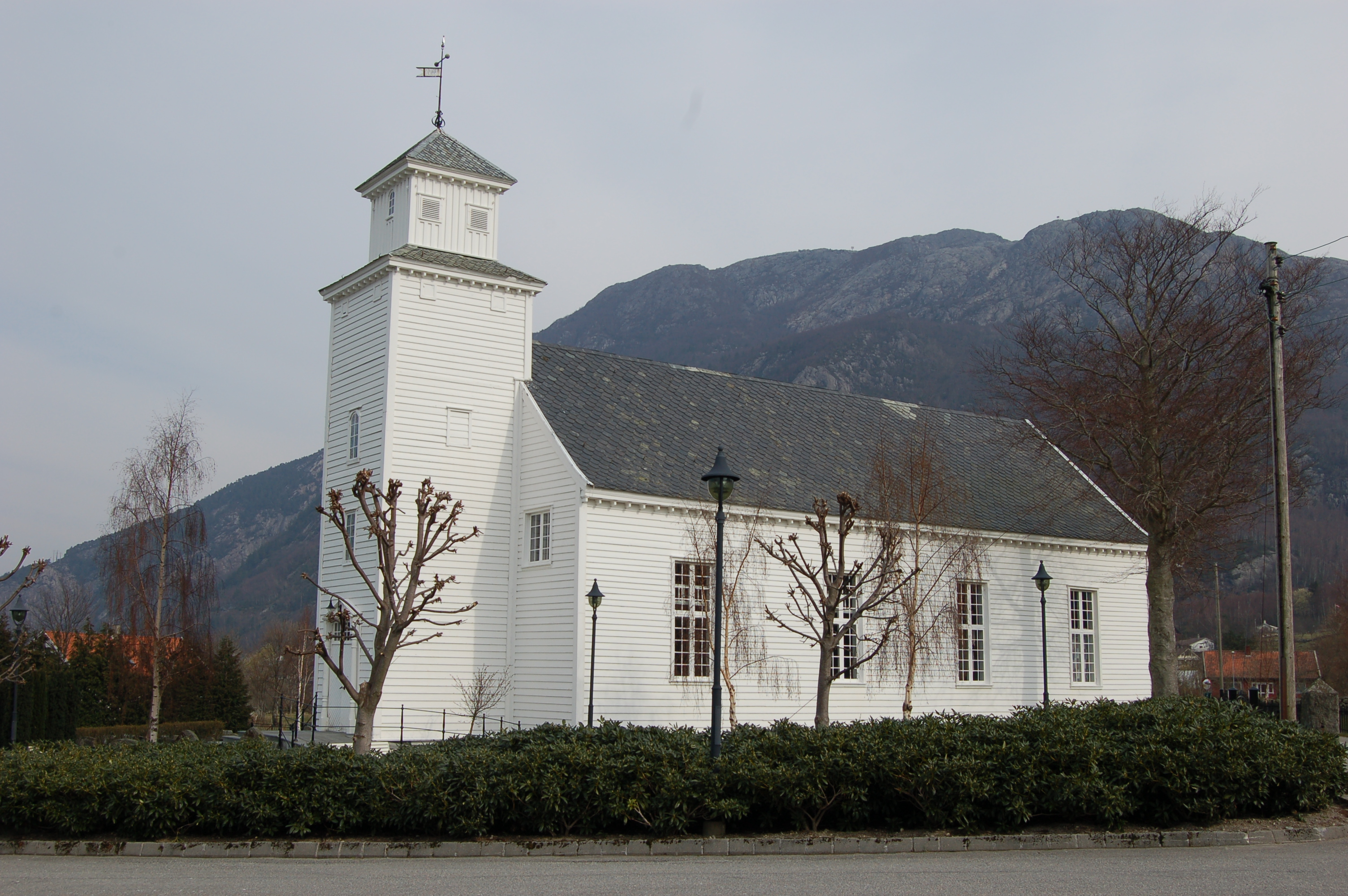
Forsand Church in the village of Forsand.

The 0.81-square-kilometre (200-acre) village has a population (2025) of 559, giving the village a population density of 690 inhabitants per square kilometre (1,800/sq mi). The Lysefjord Bridge crosses the fjord to the north of the village. The village of Forsand has two grocery stores, Forsand Church, and Forsand School.

== History ==
Prior to a municipal merger in 2020, the village of Forsand was the administrative centre of the old Forsand Municipality which is now part of Sandnes Municipality.
