= Oanes =

Village in Strand Municipality, Norway

- Village
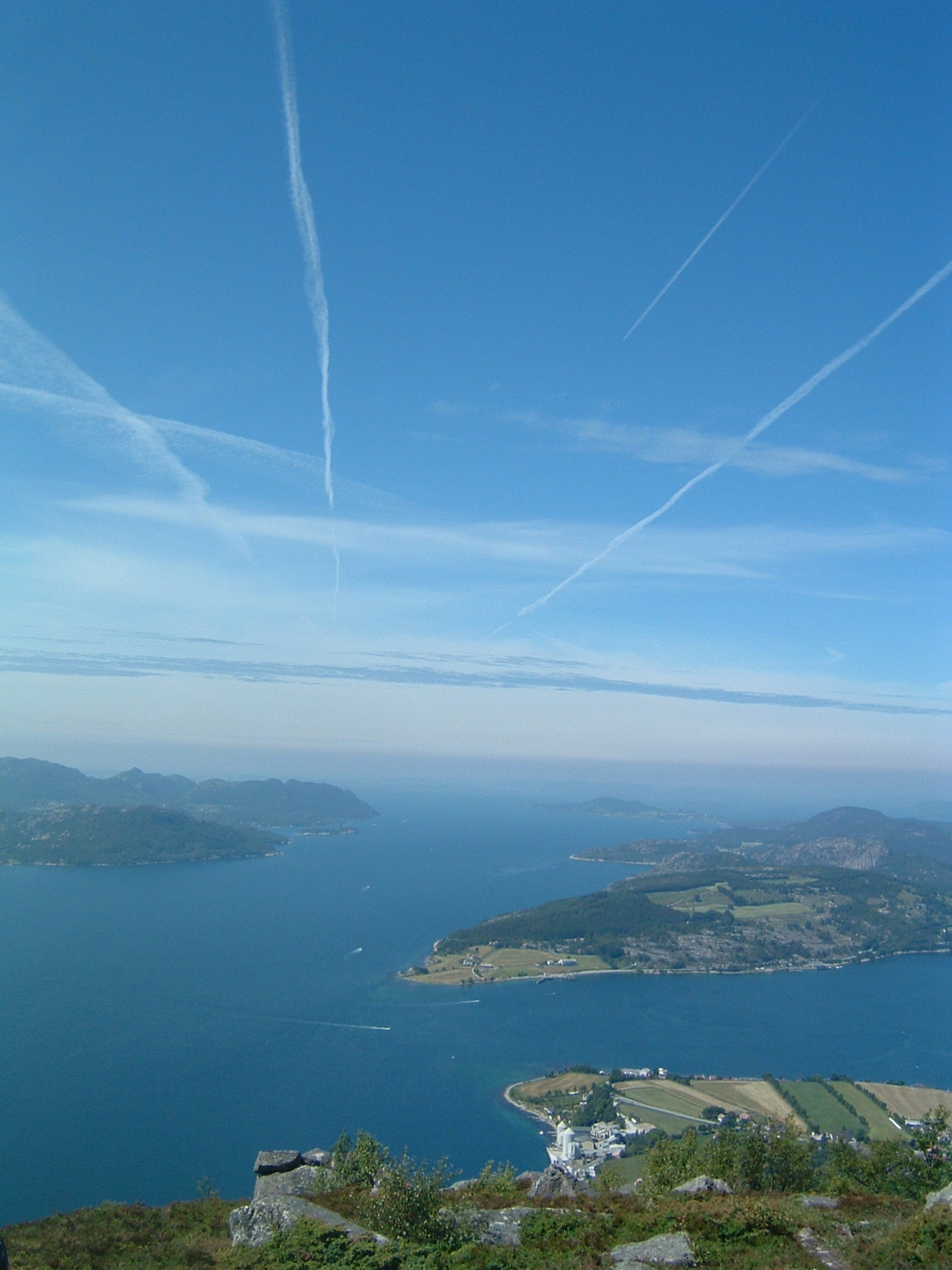
- Oanes is at the end of the peninsula with Lysefjorden to the right and Høgsfjorden to the left
- Interactive map of Oanes
- Coordinates: 58.90538°N 6.07355°E
- Country: Norway
- Region: Western Norway
- County: Rogaland
- District: Ryfylke
- Municipality: Strand Municipality
- Elevation: 7 m (23 ft)
- Time zone: UTC+01:00 (CET)
  - Summer (DST): UTC+02:00 (CEST)
- Post Code: 4110 Forsand

Oanes is a small farming village in Strand Municipality in Rogaland county, Norway. The village is located at the intersection between the Lysefjorden and Høgsfjorden, just north of the village of Forsand. The Norwegian county road 523 runs through the village, just west of the Lysefjord Bridge. Oanes has a ferry quay for the Lauvvik–Oanes Ferry that crosses the Høgsfjorden.

== History ==
Prior to 2020, the village and surrounding area were part of Forsand Municipality
