= Kjeragbolten =

Boulder in Norway

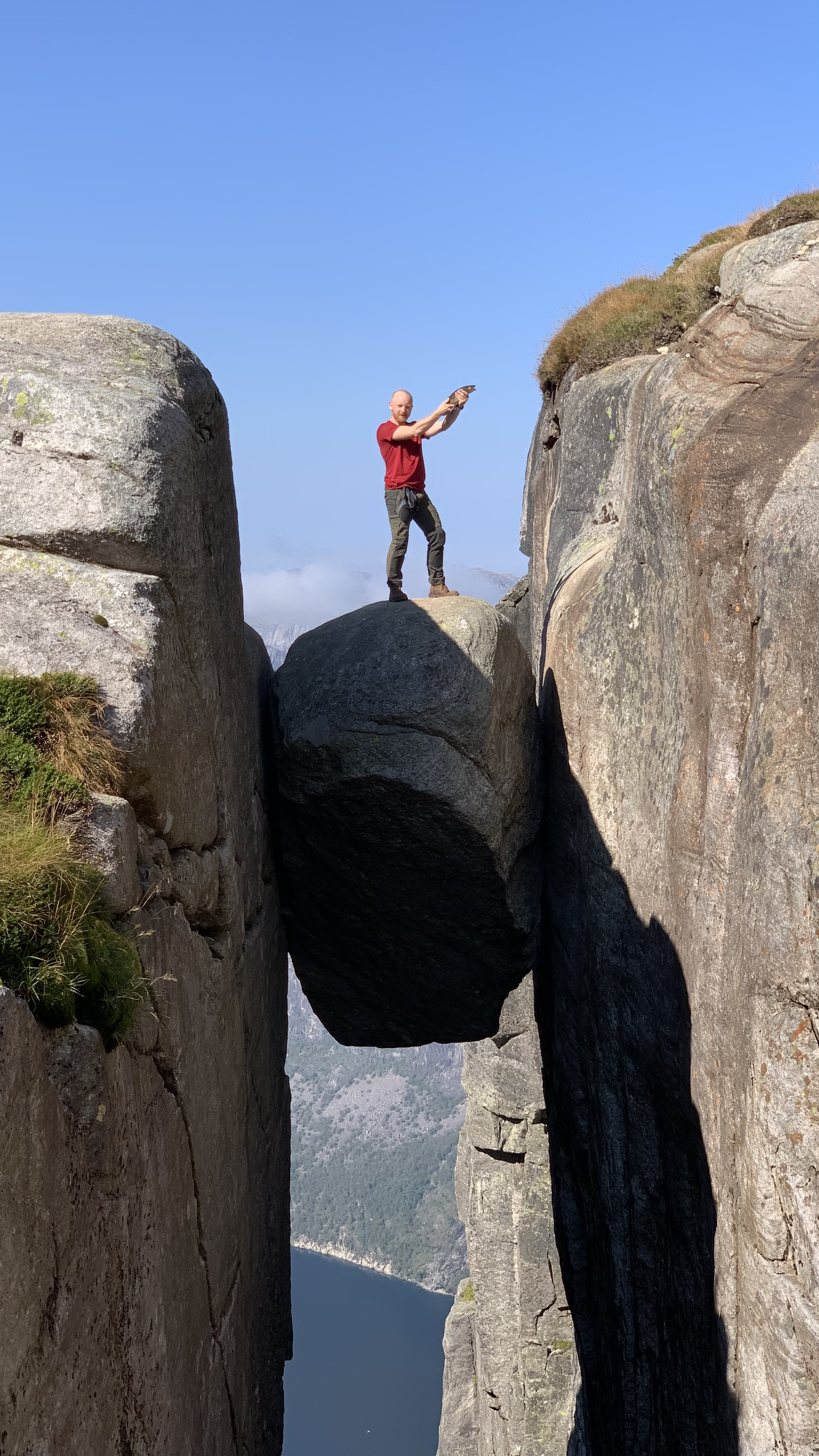
- A man standing on top of Kjeragbolten

Highest point
- Elevation: 984 m (3,228 ft)
- Coordinates: 59°02′01″N 6°35′36″E

Geography
- Location: Rogaland, Norway
- Topo map: 1313 III Lyngsvatnet

Kjeragbolten (English: Kjerag Bolt) is a boulder on the mountain Kjerag in the eastern part of Sandnes Municipality in Rogaland county, Norway. The rock itself is a 5-cubic-metre (180 cu ft) glacial deposit wedged in a large crevice in the mountain. It is a popular tourist destination and is accessible without any climbing equipment. However, it is suspended above a 984-metre (3,228 ft) deep abyss. It is also a popular site for BASE jumping. The boulder is just southwest of the village of Lysebotn, just south of the Lysefjorden.

== Geology ==
Rogaland lies in a weak tectonic zone, allowing the river to dig into the surrounding sandstone mountain. During the several glaciations known to have occurred in Scandinavia, Norway was completely covered in glaciers. Between the glaciations, the meltwater formed and reformed the valley up to 22 times. After the last glacial period, global warming caused a rise in sea level, flooding the fjords. The boulder was deposited during this last glaciation at around 50,000 B.C. As the Norwegian Glacier melted, it was accompanied by a rebound in rock formations as the ice was removed. In Kjeragbolten's case, the rebound was faster than the rising sea level, which wedged the rock into its current position.

== Tourism ==
Kjeragbolten has long been a famed photo opportunity in the Kjerag trails. It was featured in the 2006 viral video Where the Hell is Matt? where traveler Matt Harding danced atop the precarious boulder. Because of its enormous popularity, long lines usually form with people who want to have a photo from the site. Expected waiting time can be anywhere from a few minutes to over an hour, especially when there are cruise ships in Stavanger. The boulder is easy to step onto from the side. There have been no recorded deaths from falling off the boulder in Norwegian history.

It is a popular location for BASE jumping, but one source noted that "there are several BASE-jumping accidents every year" there.

== Popular culture ==
A movie song called "Amali thumali" from the 2011 film Tamil language movie Ko (film) features the lead couples standing on this rock.

== See also ==
- List of individual rocks
- Preikestolen
- Kjerag
- The Immortal Bridge, a similar formation on Mount Tai
