= Lysefjord =

Fjord in Rogaland, Norway

Lysefjorden
- Lysefjord (unofficial)
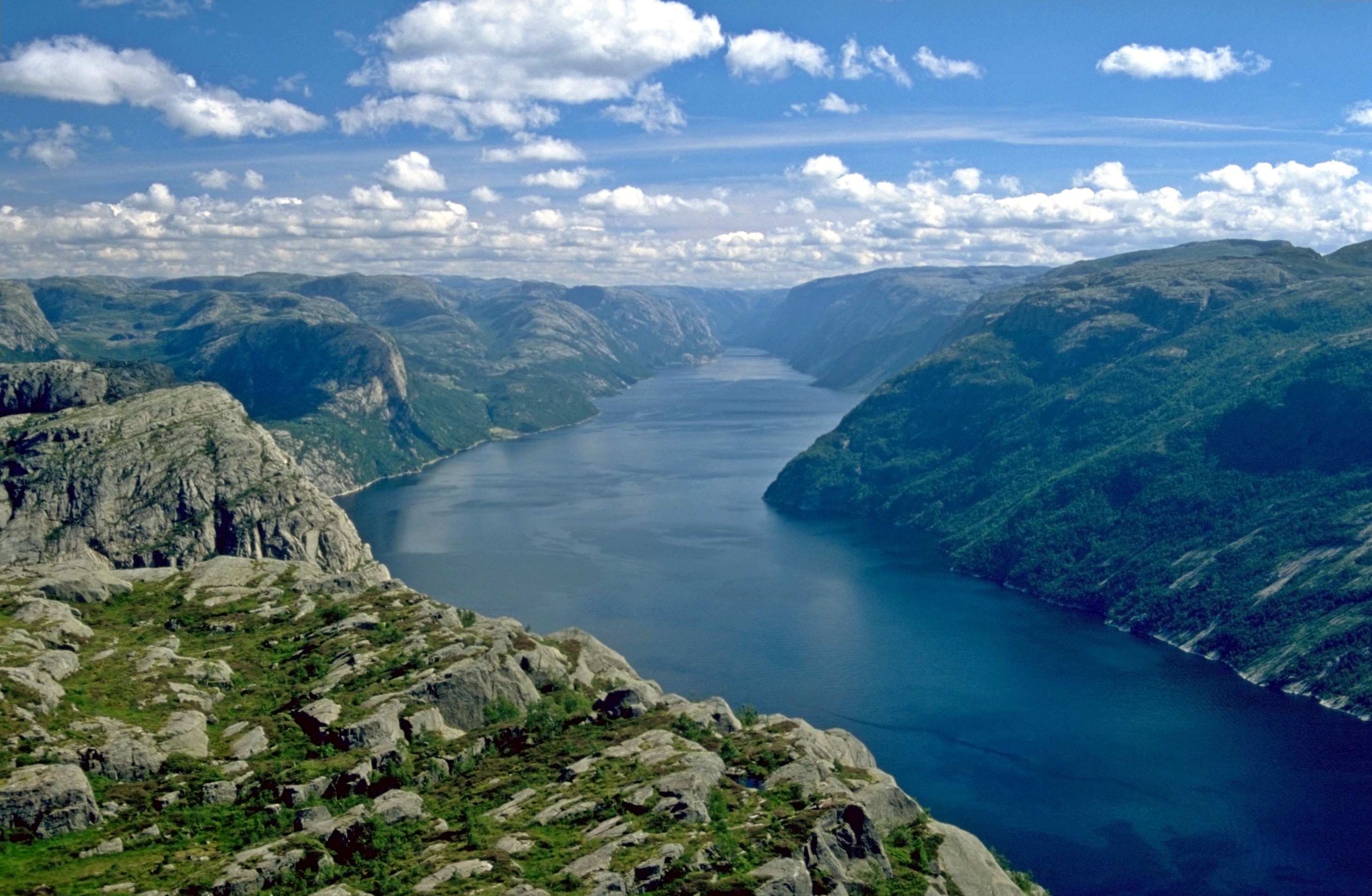
- View of the fjord
- Interactive map of the fjord
- Location: Rogaland county, Norway
- Coordinates: 59.00453°N 6.30519°E
- Type: Fjord
- Primary inflows: Lyseåna river
- Primary outflows: Høgsfjorden
- Basin countries: Norway
- Max. length: 42 kilometres (26 mi)
- Max. width: 1.75 kilometres (1.09 mi)
- Max. depth: 422 metres (1,385 ft)
- Settlements: Lysebotn, Forsand, Oanes

Lysefjord or Lysefjorden is a fjord located in the Ryfylke area in Rogaland county in southwestern Norway. The 42-kilometre (26 mi) long fjord lies in Strand Municipality and Sandnes Municipality, about 25 kilometres (16 mi) east of the city of Stavanger.

The name means light fjord, and is said to be derived from the lightly coloured granite rocks along its sides. It is particularly well known for the huge Preikestolen cliff overlooking the fjord, which is a major tourist destination for the region. The fairly isolated village of Lysebotn lies at the eastern end of the fjord and the villages of Forsand and Oanes both lie at the western end of the fjord near the Lysefjord Bridge, the only crossing of the fjord.

== Geology ==
The fjord was carved by the action of glaciers in the ice ages and was flooded by the sea when the later glaciers retreated. The geology of Lysefjorden was thoroughly investigated and described by Professor Bjørn G. Andersen in his Master's thesis (1954) "Om isens tilbaketrekking i området mellom Lysefjorden og Jøsenfjorden i Ryfylke" (On the glacial retreat in the area between the Lysefjord and the Jøsenfjord in Ryfylke).

End to end, it measures 42 kilometres (26 mi) with rocky walls falling nearly vertically over 1,000 metres (3,300 ft) into the water. Not only is the fjord long and narrow, it is in places as deep as the mountains are high. Starting at a depth of only 13 metres (43 ft) deep where it meets the sea near Forsand village, the Lysefjord then heads inland and drops to a depth of over 400 metres (1,300 ft) below the Preikestolen.

== Population ==
Because of the inhospitable, mountainous terrain, the fjord is only lightly populated and only has two villages on its length - Forsand and Lysebotn, located at opposite ends of the fjord. There is a small farming area on the north shore of the fjord, about halfway between the two ends. That farm area is accessible by road from the village of Årdal over the mountains to the north. There are a few other very small, scattered settlements along the fjord, but those are only accessible by boat along the fjord. There are no roads along the fjord since the sides of the fjord are too steep for roads.

Lysebotn, at the far eastern end of the fjord, is largely populated by workers at the nearby hydroelectric plants at Lyse and Tjodan, both built inside the mountains. At the Lyse plant, the water falls 620 metres (2,030 ft) to the turbines, producing up to 210,000 kilowatts (280,000 hp) of electricity. At Tjodan, the water falls 896 metres (2,940 ft) to yield an output of 110,000 kilowatts (150,000 hp). The two power plants provide electricity for more than 100,000 people. A spectacular road which rises almost 900 metres (3,000 ft) through a series of 27 hairpin bends including a long hairpin tunnel inside the mountain is the only road access to Lysebotn from the outside world.

== Gallery ==
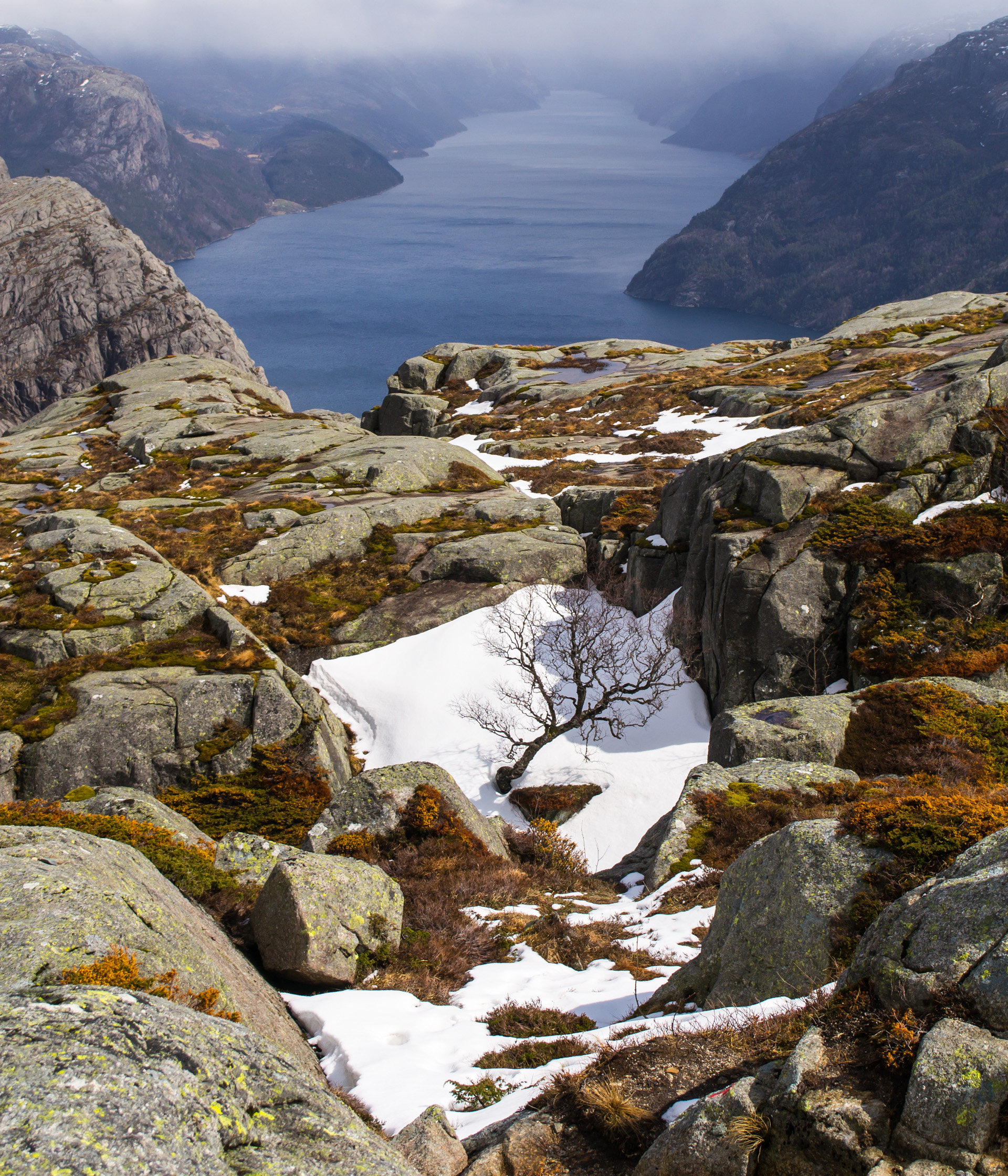
Lysefjord from the top of Preikestolen

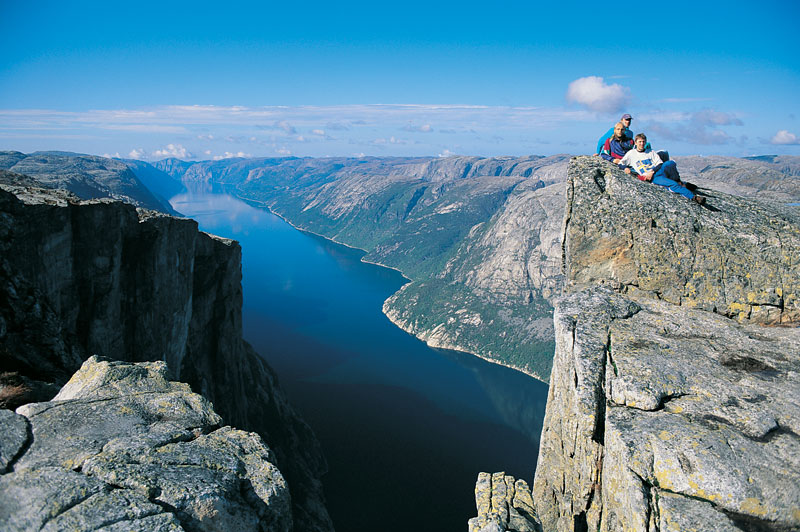
Lysefjord from Kjerag mountain

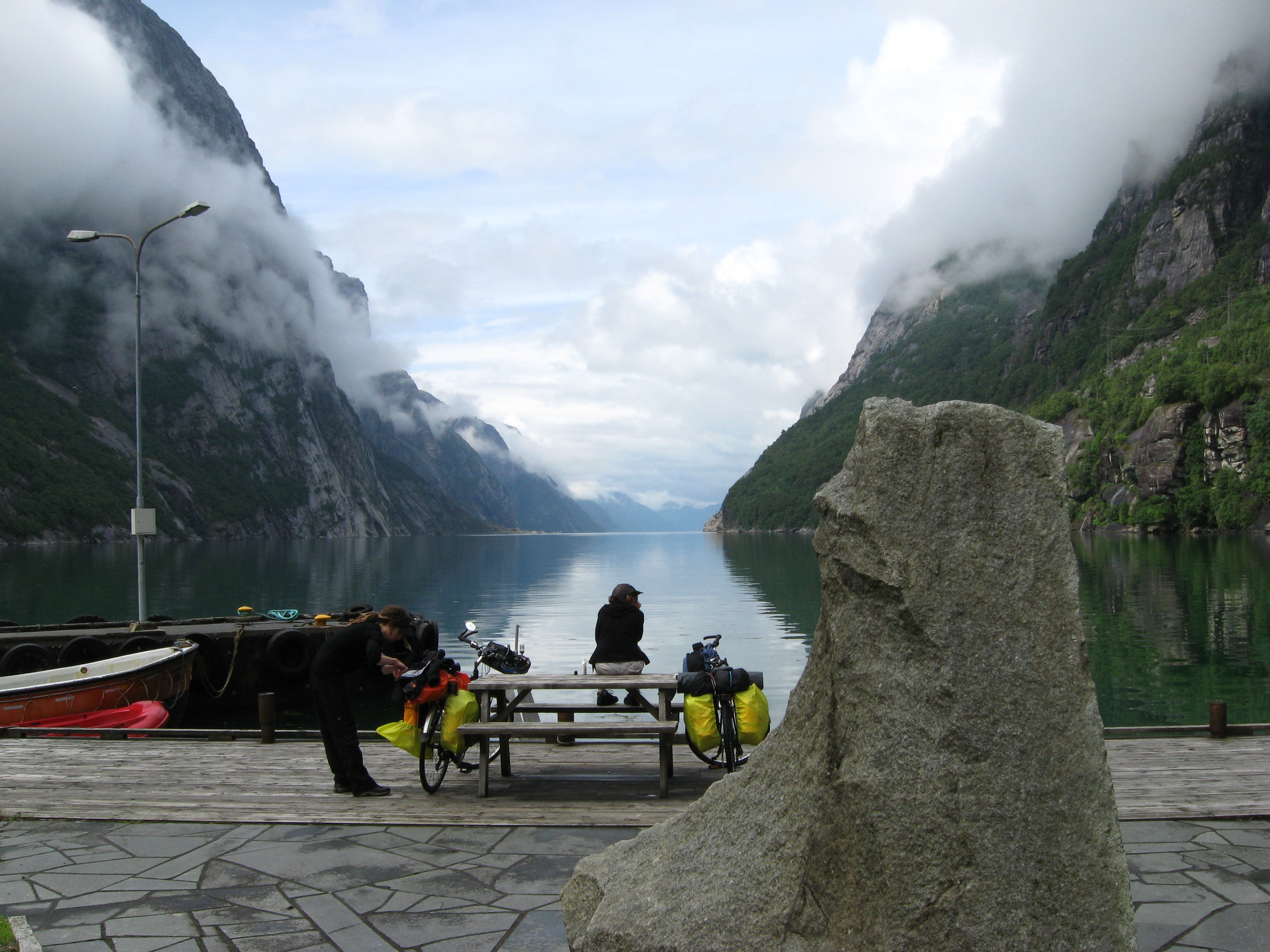
Lysefjord from Lysebotn

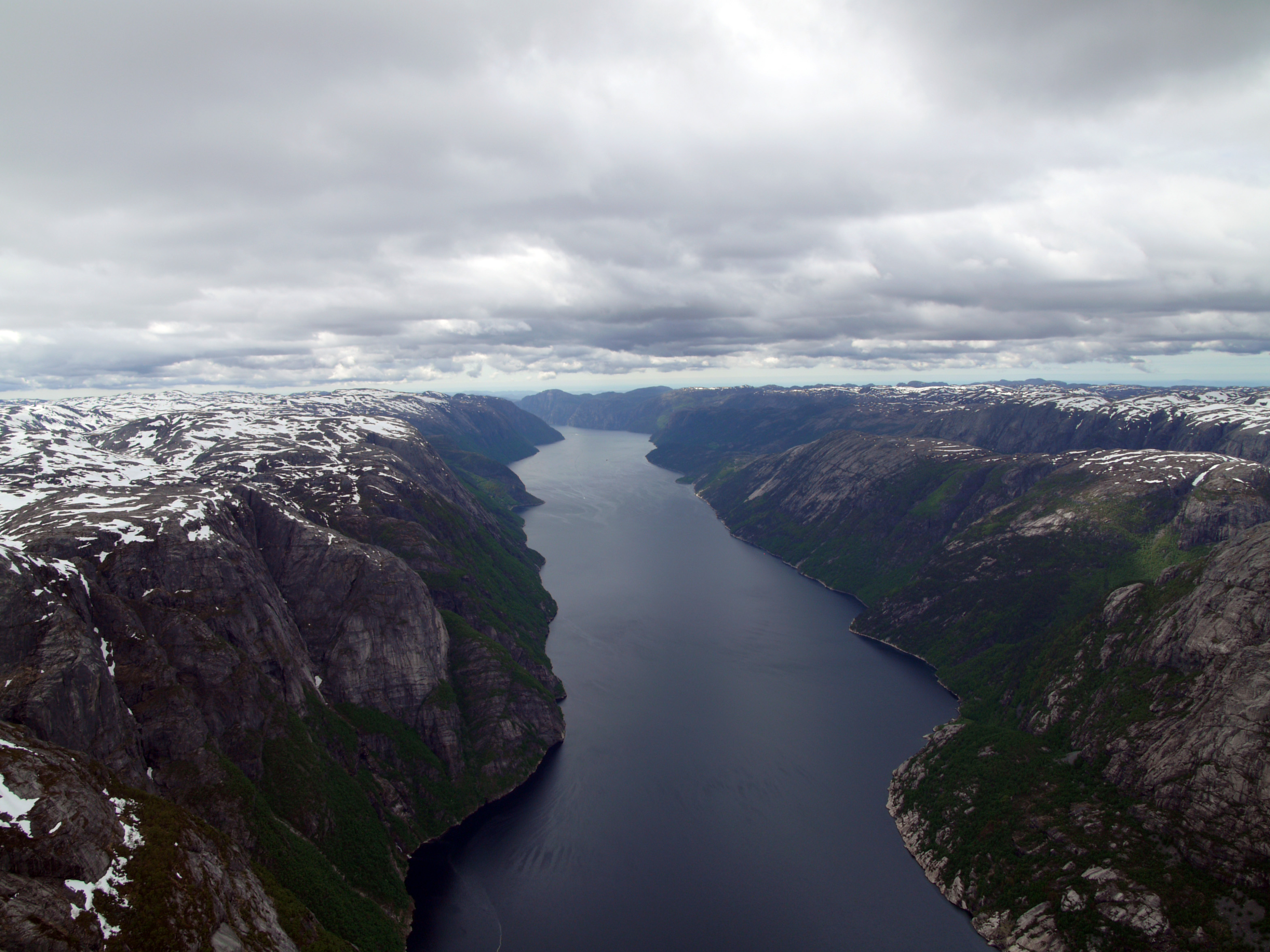
Lysefjorden looking west

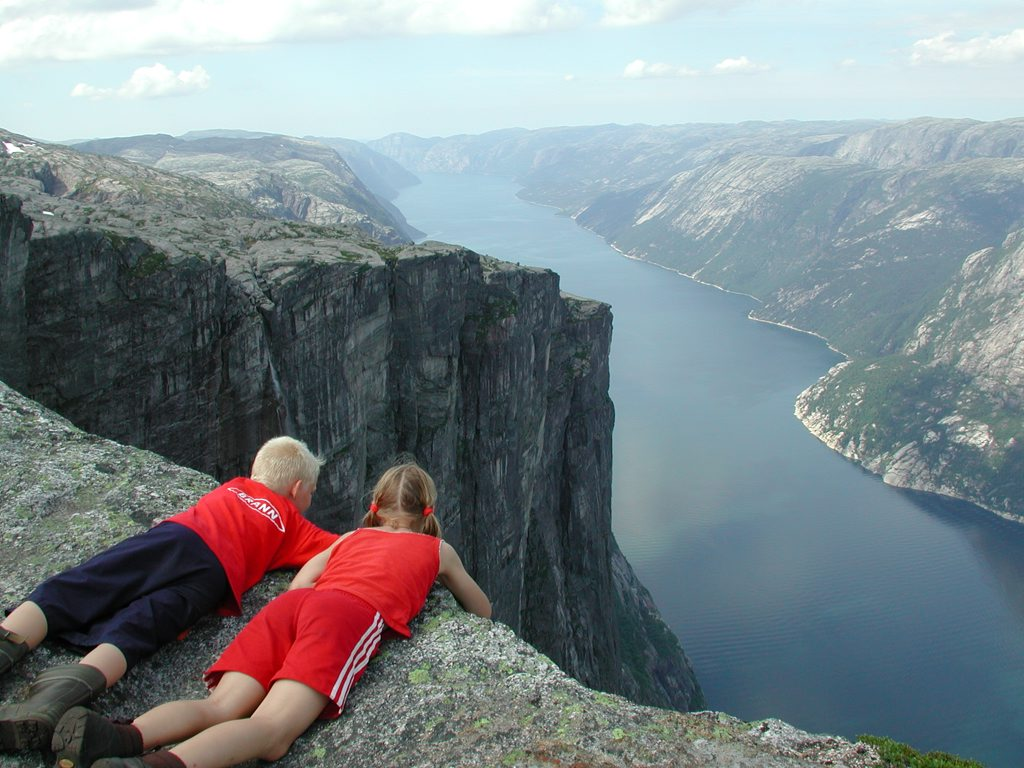
Looking over the cliff at Kjerag

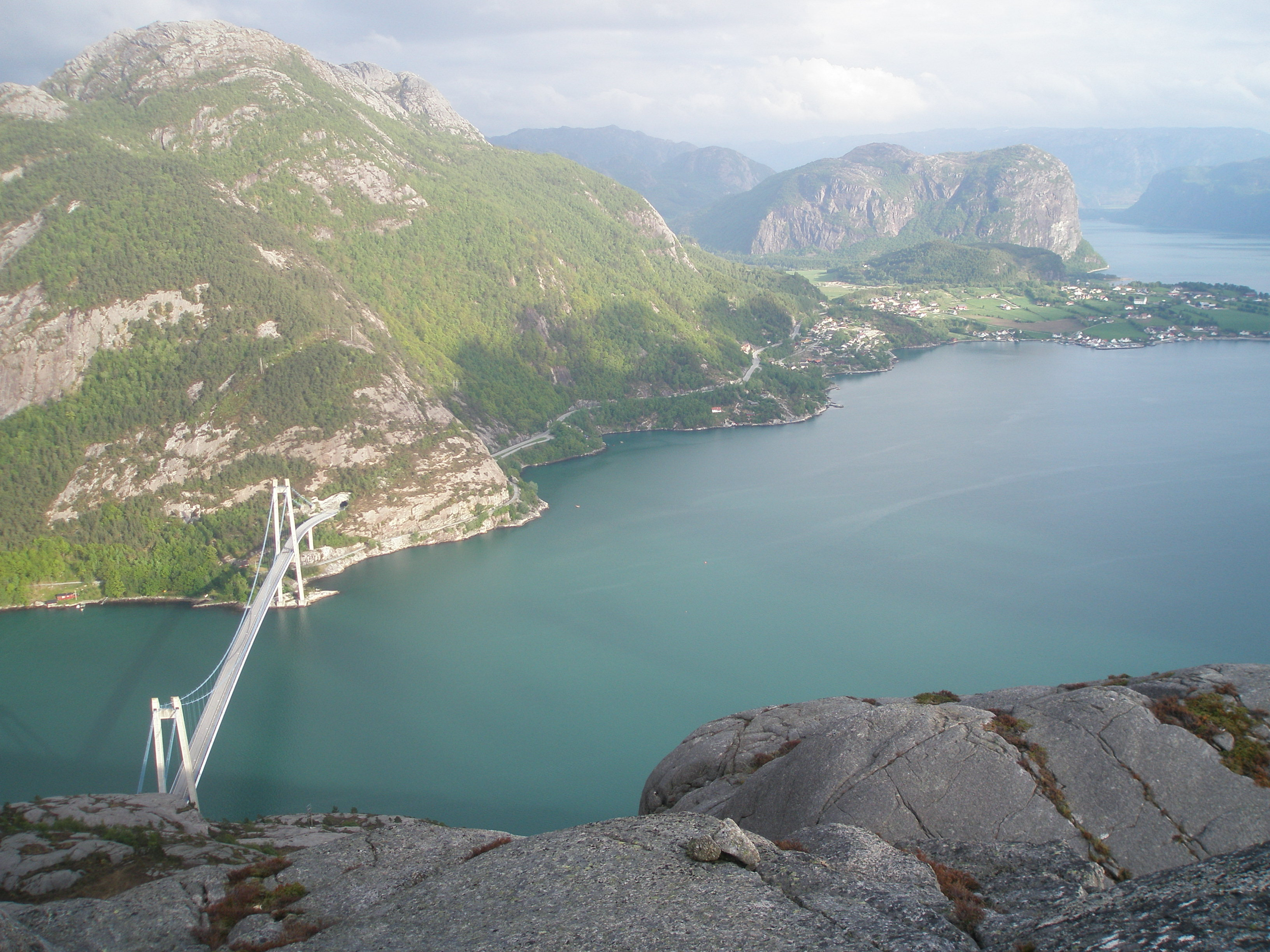
Lysefjord Bridge

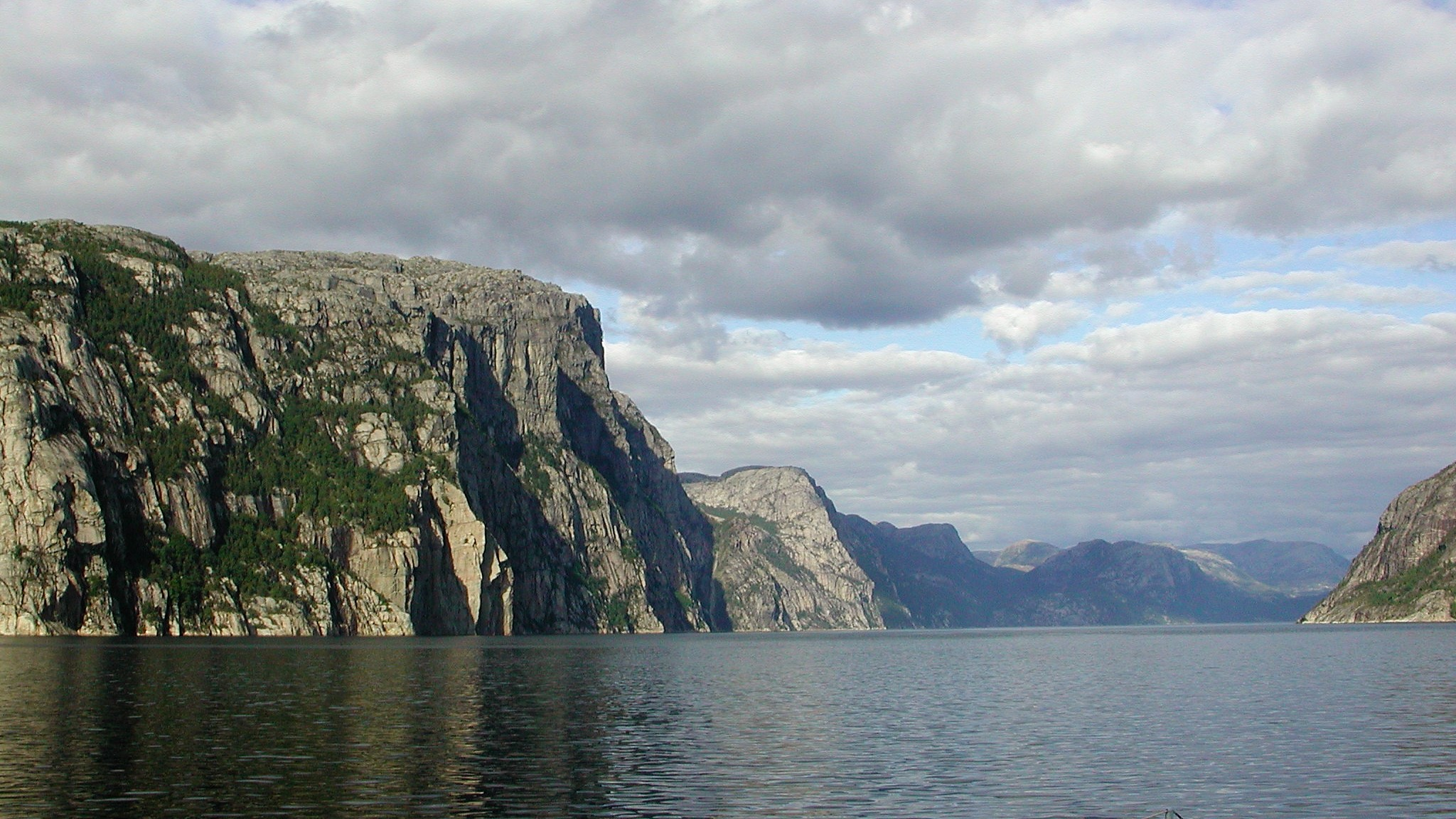
Lysefjorden, Rogaland fylke

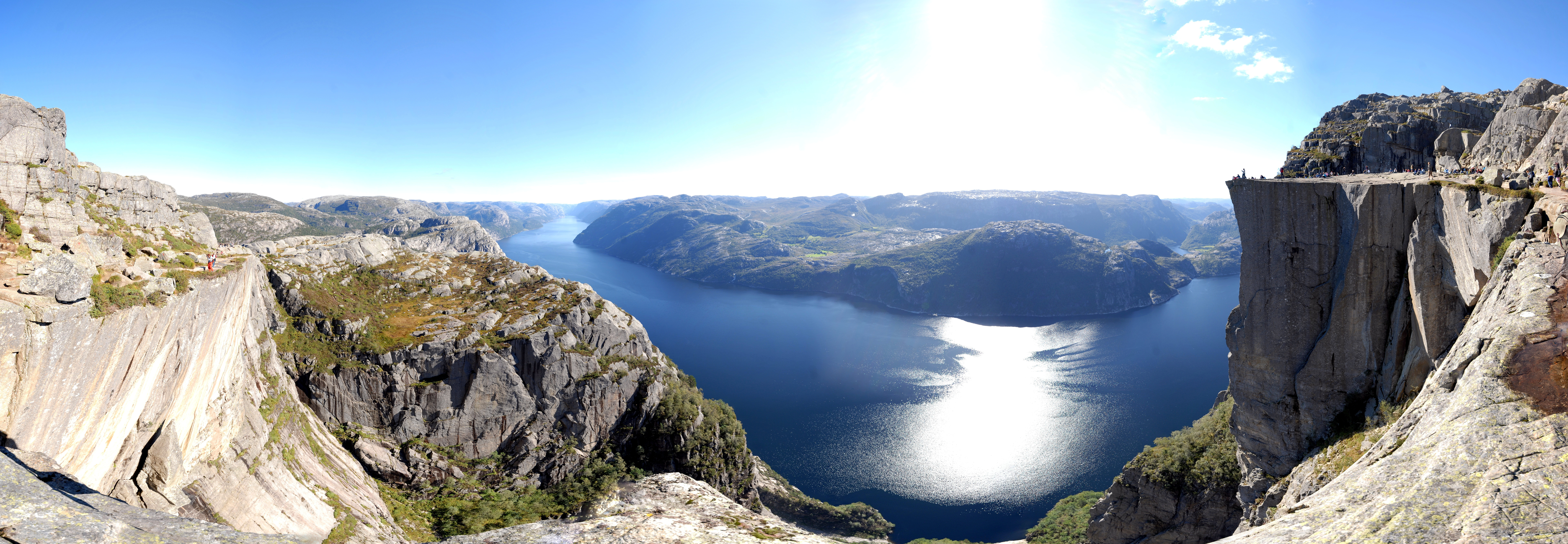
Panorama of Lysefjord with Preikestolen at the right of the image

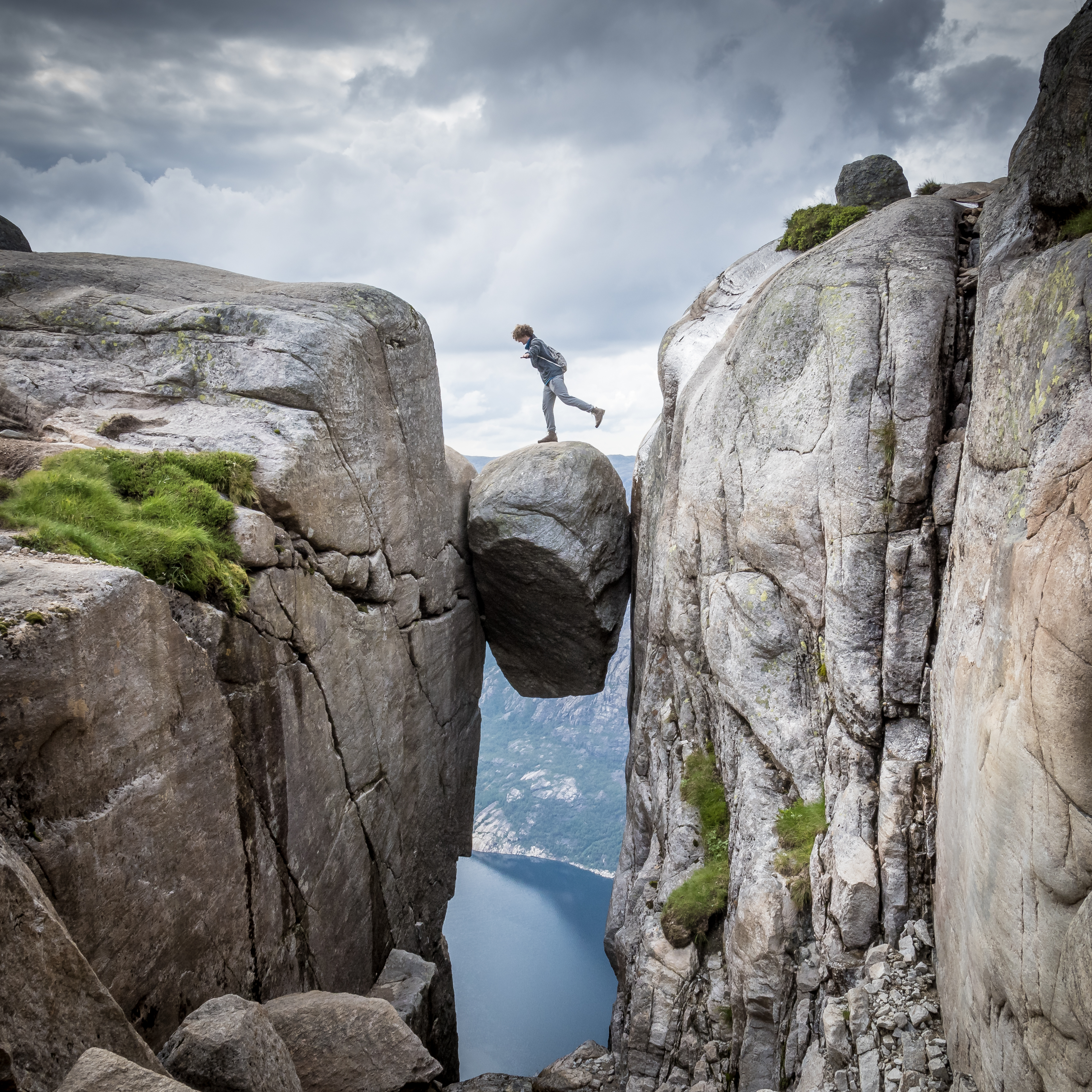
Kjeragbolten

== Tourism ==
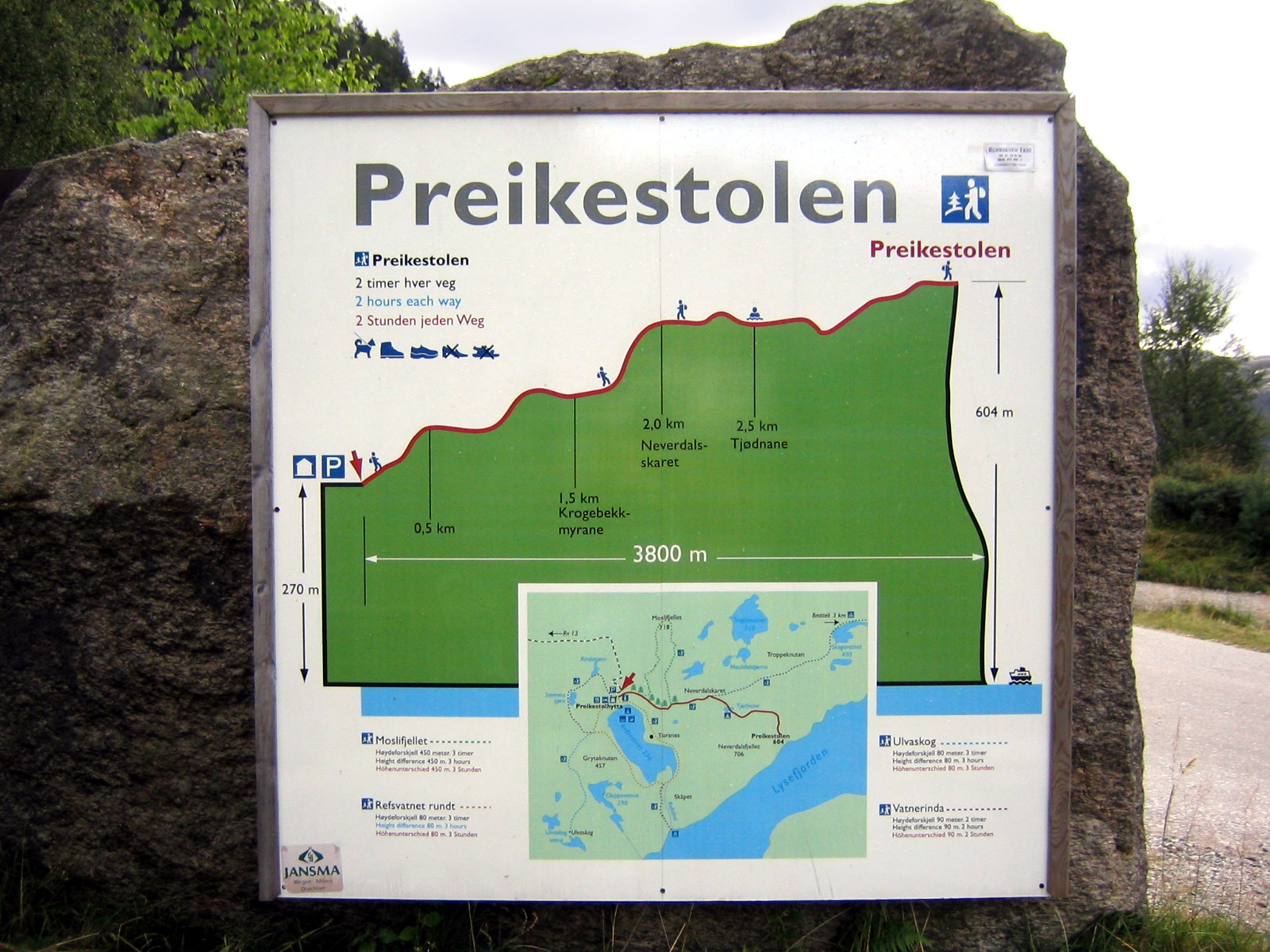
Information board on the trail

Lysefjorden is an extremely popular tourist attraction and day trip from the nearby city of Stavanger, from where cruise ships travel the full distance of the fjord. As well as the extraordinary scenery of the fjord itself, two points along its length are popular side trips. The towering cliff of Preikestolen, located above the fjord with a vertical drop of 604 metres (1,982 ft) (see the information board) can be seen from the fjord, but is more impressive from above. At the end of the fjord lies the 1,110-metre (3,640 ft) tall Kjerag mountain, a popular hiking destination with even more spectacular drops. The Kjeragbolten is a famous boulder located at the Kjerag mountain. BASE jumping is legally allowed along the cliffs of the fjord.

== Toilers of the Sea ==
French writer Victor Hugo wrote the novel, Toilers of the Sea, in which he admires the scenery of the fjord after a visit here in 1866.

Nowhere do these terrific forces appear more formidably conjoined than in the surprising strait known as the Lyse-Fiord. The Lyse-Fiord is the most terrible of all the gut rocks of the ocean. Their terrors are there complete. It is in the northern sea, near the inhospitable Gulf of Stavanger, and in the 59th degree of latitude. The water is black and heavy, and subject to intermitting storms. In this sea, and in the midst of this solitude, rises a great sombre street--a street for no human footsteps. None ever pass through there; no ship ever ventures in. It is a corridor ten leagues in length, between two rocky walls of three thousand feet in height. Such is the passage which presents an entrance to the sea. The defile has its elbows and angles like all these streets of the sea--never straight, having been formed by the irregular action of the water.

— Victor Hugo, Toilers of the Sea

== See also ==
- Lysebotn Hydroelectric Power Station
- Flørli Hydroelectric Power Station
- List of Norwegian fjords
