= Lysefjord Bridge =

Lysefjord Bridge Lysefjordbrua
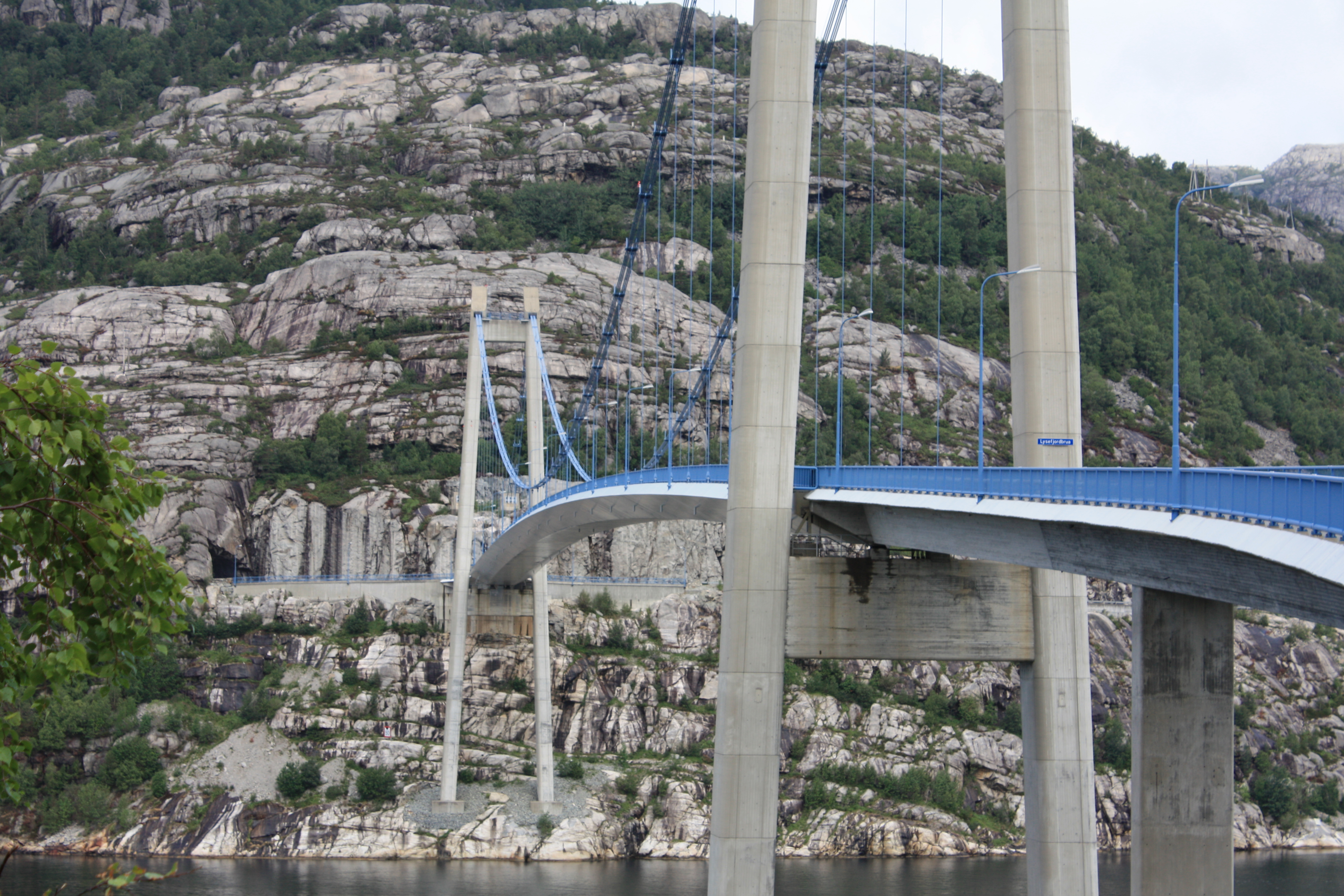
- View of the bridge (seen from the Forsand side)
- Coordinates: 58.9237°N 6.0985°E
- Carries: Fv13
- Crosses: Lysefjorden
- Locale: Rogaland, Norway

Characteristics
- Design: Suspension bridge
- Material: Steel and concrete
- Total length: 639 metres (2,096 ft)
- Width: 12.3 metres (40 ft)
- Height: 102 metres (335 ft)
- Longest span: 446 metres (1,463 ft)
- Clearance above: 50 metres (160 ft)

History
- Construction start: 1995
- Construction end: 1997

Location
- Interactive map of Lysefjord Bridge

Lysefjord Bridge Norwegian: Lysefjordbrua is a suspension bridge over the Lysefjorden in Rogaland county, Norway. The bridge connects Strand Municipality (on the north end of the bridge) and Sandnes Municipality (on the south end of the bridge). Construction on the 639-metre-long (2,096 ft) bridge began in 1995 and was finished in 1997 at a cost of 150 million kr.

The bridge carries Norwegian county road 4630, connecting to Norwegian county road 523 on the north end. Its main span is 446 metres (1,463 ft), the depth of the deck is 2.7 metres (8 ft 10 in), and the width of the bridge is 12.3 metres (40 ft). The supporting towers are 102 metres (335 ft) tall, and are made of reinforced concrete. The bridge sits about 50 metres (160 ft) above sea level, leaving enough room for the regular ferry service that runs under the bridge to the village of Lysebotn, located at the other end of the long, narrow fjord.

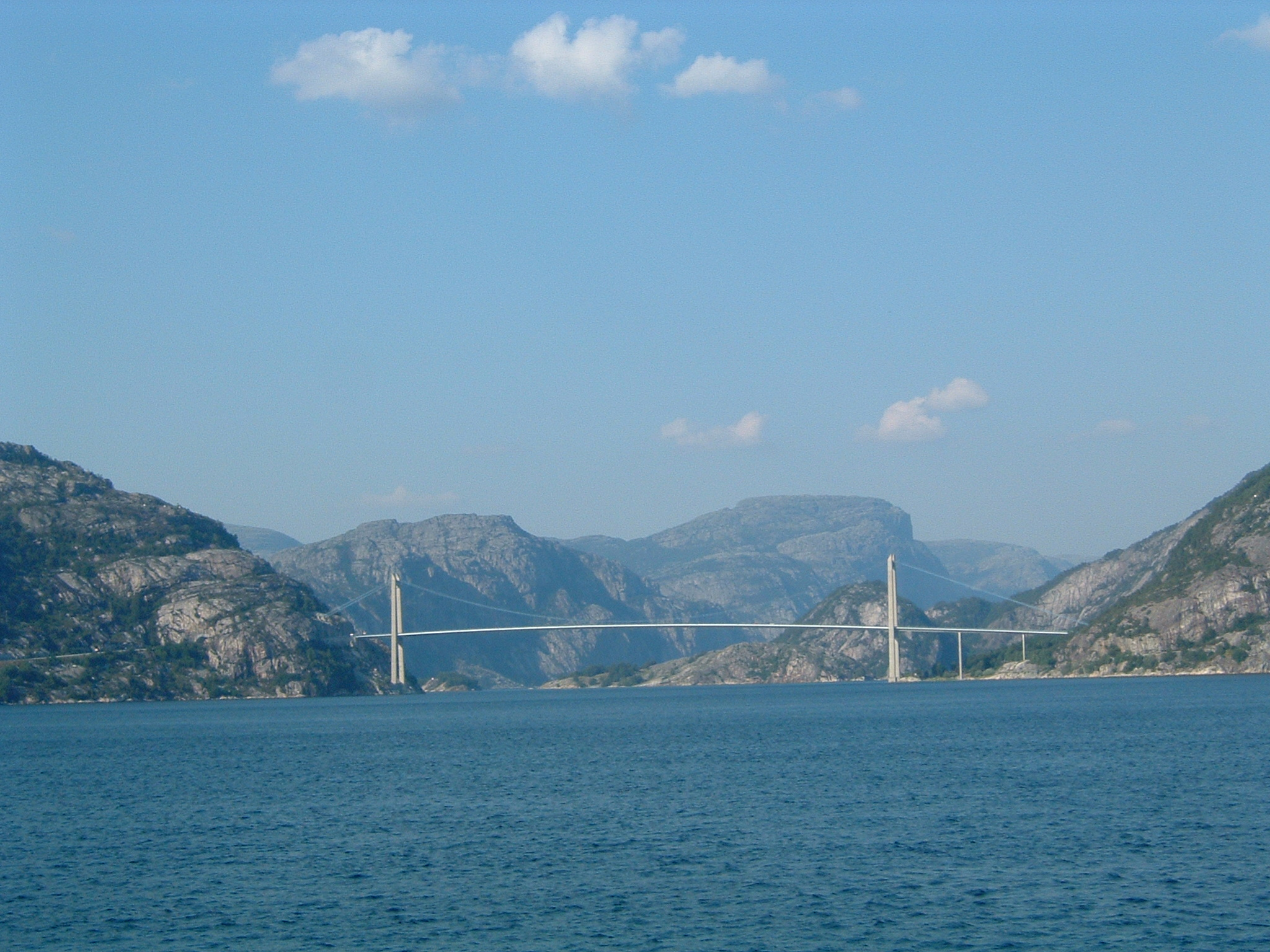
Lysefjord Bridge seen from the MF Høgsfjord
Credit: Hallvard Nygård

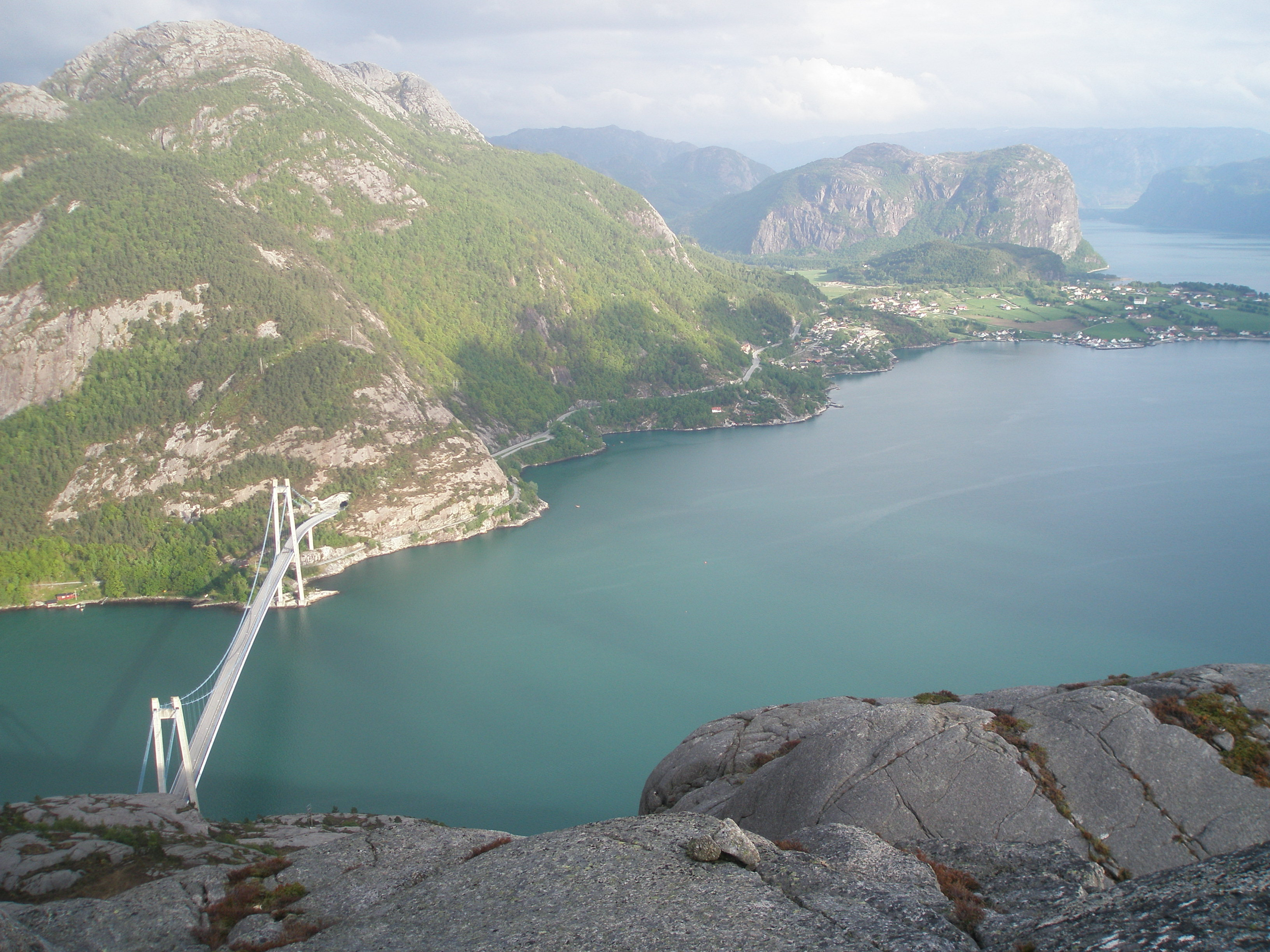
Aerial view of Lysefjord Bridge
