= Escape Plan =

An escape plan is a plan for prison escape or from other forms of confinement.

Escape Plan may also refer to:

- Escape Plan (video game), 2012 puzzle video game
- Escape Plan (film series), an American prison action thriller film series that debuted with the film Escape Plan in 2013
  - Escape Plan (film), the first film in the series
  - Escape Plan 2: Hades, the sequel to the 2013 film
  - Escape Plan: The Extractors, the sequel to the 2018 film
- "Escape Plan" (song), 2021 single by American rapper Travis Scott
- "Escape Plan" (NCIS: New Orleans), a 2016 television episode

== See also ==
- The Getaway Plan, a rock band from Melbourne, Australia
