= Escape Plan (film series) =

Action-thriller film series starring Sylvester Stallone

- Official film series logo
- Created by: Miles Chapman
- Original work: Escape Plan (2013)
- Owner: Lionsgate Studios
- Years: 2013–2019

Films and television
- Film: Escape Plan (2013)
- Direct-to-video: Escape Plan 2: Hades (2018); Escape Plan: The Extractors (2019)

The Escape Plan film series consists of three American prison action-thrillers based on characters created by Miles Chapman and Arnell Jesko. The series is centered on Ray Breslin, a security analyst and escape artist who helps design supermax prisons by posing as an inmate to find their flaws; later films center on his security and hostage rescue firm. The series stars Sylvester Stallone, with a supporting cast including Arnold Schwarzenegger, Dave Bautista and Curtis "50 Cent" Jackson as allies and associates of Breslin. All entries in the series since the second film have primarily been released direct-to-video, though they have also been released in some theaters. The series has received a mixed-to-negative critical response.

== Films ==
Film	U.S. release date	Director(s)	Screenwriter(s)	Story by	Producer(s)
Escape Plan	October 18, 2013	Mikael Håfström	Arnell Jesko & Miles Chapman	Miles Chapman	Mark Canton, Robbie Brenner, Randall Emmett, Remington Chase & Kevin King-Templeton
Escape Plan 2: Hades	June 29, 2018	Steven C. Miller	Miles Chapman	Miles Chapman	Jie Qiu, Xing Su, Mark Canton, George Furla, Zack Schiller, Robbie Brenner & Randall Emmett
Escape Plan: The Extractors	July 2, 2019	John Herzfeld	John Herzfeld & Miles Chapman	John Herzfeld & Miles Chapman	Jie Qiu, Xing Su, Mark Canton, George Furla, Zack Schiller, Robbie Brenner & Randall Emmett

=== Escape Plan (2013) ===
Security expert Ray Breslin's work consists of being imprisoned in high-security prisons, then attempting to escape to highlight flaws in their security. Accepting a job offer to escape a specialized maximum-security prison—on the condition that he does not know its location—he finds himself incarcerated in the world's most secret and secure prison, "The Tomb". When the plan goes awry and he finds himself actually incarcerated for life, Breslin must team up with his fellow prisoners and use his skills and experience to escape.

=== Escape Plan 2: Hades (2018) ===
Years after escaping The Tomb, Ray Breslin has expanded his security company's operations, hiring a team and working a wide range of operations. After a team member goes missing during a routine operation, Breslin and his associate Trent DeRosa must work to rescue them from their high-tech off-the-grid prison known as "HADES".

=== Escape Plan: The Extractors (2019) ===
When a business magnate's daughter and her entourage are abducted, Ray Breslin and his team must work with her former bodyguard to rescue them from the top secret black site they are imprisoned in, operated by the vengeful son of his former business partner who betrayed him years prior.

== Main cast and characters ==
List indicator

This section includes characters who will appear or have appeared in the franchise in main roles.

- An empty grey cell indicates the character was not in the film, or that the character's official presence has not yet been confirmed.

Character	Films		
Character	Escape Plan	Escape Plan 2: Hades	Escape Plan: The Extractors
Character	2013	2018	2019
Ray Breslin	Sylvester Stallone	Sylvester Stallone	Sylvester Stallone
Hush	Curtis "50 Cent" Jackson		
Abigail Ross	Amy Ryan	Jaime King	Jaime King
Jules	Lydia Hull	Lydia Hull	Lydia Hull
Emil Rottmayer	Arnold Schwarzenegger		
Javed	Faran Tahir		
Dr. Kyrie	Sam Neill		
Jessica Mayer	Caitriona Balfe		
Warden Hobbes	Jim Caviezel		
Drake	Vinnie Jones		
Lester Clark	Vincent D'Onofrio		Vincent D'Onofrio (Note: archive footage)
Trent DeRosa		Dave Bautista	Dave Bautista
Shu Ren		Huang Xiaoming	
Luke Walken		Jesse Metcalfe	
Jaspar Kimbral		Wes Chatham	
Shen Lo			Max Zhang
Lester Clark, Jr.			Devon Sawa
Bao Yung			Harry Shum Jr.
Daya Zhang			Malese Jow
Narco			Sergio Rizzuto

== Additional crew and production details ==
Film	Crew/Detail					
Film	Composer(s)	Cinematographer	Editor(s)	Production companies	Distribution companies	Running time
Escape Plan	Alex Heffes	Brendan Galvin	Elliot Greenberg	Emmett/Furla Films; Envision Entertainment; Boies/Schiller Film Group; Atmosphere Entertainment	Summit Entertainment	115 mins
Escape Plan 2: Hades	Andy Grush; Taylor Newton-Stewart	Brandon Cox	Vincent Tabaillon	The Fyzz; Lionsgate; Leomus Pictures; Ingeni0us Media; Summit Entertainment LLC; Emmett/Furla/Oasis Films; Potato Eater Productions; Grindstone Entertainment Group	Lionsgate Home Entertainment	96 mins
Escape Plan: The Extractors	Victor Reyes	Jacques Jouffret	Sean Albertson	The Fyzz; Lionsgate; Twirly Films; Ingeni0s Media; Leomus Pictures; MoviePass Films; Universal Pictures; Highland Film Group; Summit Entertainment LLC; Emmett/Furla/Oasis Films; Diamond Films Productions	Lionsgate Home Entertainment	96 mins

== Reception ==
=== Box office performance ===
Film	Box office gross			Box office ranking		Video sales gross	Gross income	Budget	Worldwide net income	Ref.
Film	North America	Other territories	Worldwide	All-time North America	All-time worldwide	North America	Gross income	Budget	Worldwide net income	Ref.
Escape Plan	$25,135,965	$112,192,336	$137,328,301	#2,944	#3,015	$15,513,273	$152,821,264	$54,000,000	$98,821,264	
Escape Plan 2: Hades		$17,592,626	$17,592,626		#5,476	$4,215,543	$21,802,826	$20,000,000	$1,071,471	
Escape Plan: The Extractors		$1,895,577	$1,895,577		#11,883	$2,895,985	$4,786,632	$3,600,000	$1,183,923	
Totals	$25,135,965	$131,680,539	$156,816,504	x̃ #981	x̃ #12,452	$22,605,893	$179,402,908	$77,600,000	$101,076,658	

=== Critical and public response ===
Film	Rotten Tomatoes	Metacritic	CinemaScore
Escape Plan	50% (109 reviews)	49 (33 reviews)	B+
Escape Plan 2: Hades	8% (24 reviews)	—N/a	—N/a
Escape Plan: The Extractors	25% (12 reviews)	—N/a	—N/a
