= List of Chinese films of 1991 =

A list of mainland Chinese films released in 1991:

Title	Director	Cast	Genre	Notes
Beijing Girl	Qin Zhiyu	Ma Yashu	Fantasy	
Comic Star	Liu Guoquan	Ge You	Drama	
Girl of the Times	Liu Guoquan	Ge You, Ding Yi	Drama	
Good Morning, Beijing	Zhang Nuanxing		Drama	
Li Lianying: The Imperial Eunuch	Tian Zhuangzhuang	Jiang Wen, Liu Xiaoqing	Biographical	Won an Honourable Mention at the 41st Berlin International Film Festival
Life on a String	Chen Kaige		Drama	Entered into the 1991 Cannes Film Festival
Raise the Red Lantern	Zhang Yimou	Gong Li	Tragedy	
The Spring Festival	Huang Jianzhong	Li Baotian, Ge You	Comedy	
Steel Meets Fire	He Qun, Jiang Hao	Ge You	War	
The Swordsman in Double Flag Town	He Ping		Action	
Unexpected Passion	Xia Gang	Lü Liping, Fan Yuan	Drama	

== See also ==
- 1991 in China
