= Kyanna Simone =

American actress

- Born: March 28, 1997 (age 29)
- Occupation: Actress
- Years active: 2012–present

Kyanna Simone is an American actress. She is best known for playing Yvonne in the Netflix horror series Chambers and Brenda Moore in the crime drama movie White Boy Rick.

== Early life ==
Simone grew up in Decatur, Georgia. She was interested in acting from a young age. Every day when coming home from school she googled how to become an actress. Her dream came through when she bumped into Tony Vaughn, an actor known for appearing in Meet the Browns in a grocery store. She is a graduate of University of Georgia.

== Career ==
Early in her career she played a minor role in the drama film The Immortal Life of Henrietta Lacks (film) starring Oprah Winfrey. She play the recurring role of in the DC drama series Black Lightning. Her first big role came playing Yvonne in the Netflix horror series Chambers opposite Sivan Alyra Rose. She had a recurring role as Nhani Rivers in the sports drama All American. She played Odette one of the lead roles in the drama film The Supremes at Earl's All-You-Can-Eat alongside Tati Gabrielle. She portrayed Baby Girl in the comedy thriller film Eenie Meanie starring Samara Weaving.

== Filmography ==
=== Film ===
Year	Title	Role	Notes
2013	A Christmas Blessing	Raynesha	
2014	Unspoken Words	Orphan	
2016	White Girl	Pregnant Girl	
2016	The Archer	Shauna	
2017	Fist Fight	Amber	
2017	The Immortal Life of Henrietta Lacks	Teenage Deborah	
2018	White Boy Rick	Brenda Moore	
2019	Three's Complicated	Eleni	
2019	Ma	Young Sue Ann	
2019	Ambition	Veronica	
2020	Project Power	Tracy	
2020	Vegas High	Woman	
2022	The Year Between	Beth	
2024	The Rebel Girls	Bertha	Short
2024	The Supremes at Earl's All-You-Can-Eat	Young Odette	
2025	Eenie Meanie	Baby Girl	

=== Television ===
Year	Title	Role	Notes
2012	Survival of the Dumbest	White Eyes Zombie	2 episodes
2015	Law & Order: Special Victims Unit	Laura	Episode; Surrendering Noah
2015	Show Me a Hero	Tasha O'Neal	4 episodes
2015	Being Mary Jane	Renee	Episode; If the Shoes Fit
2018	Black Lightning	Kiesha	7 episodes
2019	Chambers	Yvonne	10 episodes
2021	All American	Nhani Patterson	3 episodes
2022	American Horror Stories	Lena Lawrence	Episode; Bloody Mary
2023	Grown-ish	Symone	2 episodes
2023	Winning Time: The Rise of the Lakers Dynasty	Melissa Mitchell	Episode; One Ring Don't Make a Dynasty
2024	Star Wars: Young Jedi Adventures	Somna	Episode; The Rustler Roundup/A New Discovery
