= Ron Keller =

American baseball player (born 1943)

- Pitcher
- Born: June 3, 1943 (age 82); Indianapolis, Indiana, U.S.
- Batted: Right Threw: Right

MLB debut
- July 9, 1966, for the Minnesota Twins

Last MLB appearance
- September 27, 1968, for the Minnesota Twins

MLB statistics
- Win–loss record: 0–1
- Earned run average: 3.38
- Strikeouts: 12
- Stats at Baseball Reference

Teams
- Minnesota Twins (1966, 1968)

Ronald Lee Keller (born June 3, 1943) is an American retired pitcher in Major League Baseball. He played for the Minnesota Twins. He is the father of Jason Keller, co-writer of the 2019 film Ford v Ferrari, and creator of the Apple TV+ series Stick.
