= Treasure Raiders (TV series) =

2003 Chinese TV series

- 萧十一郎
- Genre: Wuxia
- Based on: Xiao Shiyilang by Gu Long
- Written by: Chen Manling
- Directed by: Li Wenyan
- Starring: Nicky Wu; Yu Bo; Athena Chu; Ma Yashu
- Opening theme: "Turn" (转弯) by Nicky Wu
- Ending theme: "Dull Pain" (隐痛) by Nicky Wu
- Country of origin: China
- Original language: Mandarin
- No. of episodes: 40

Production
- Executive producer: Jiang Xuerou
- Cinematography: Lin Jianzhong; Zhou Junlun
- Production companies: Hainan Zhouyi Film and Television Production; Jiuzhou Audio and Video Publishing

Original release
- Network: Beijing Television
- Release: May 22, 2003 – June 2003

Treasure Raiders (萧十一郎) is a 2003 Chinese wuxia television series adapted from the novel Xiao Shiyilang (萧十一郎) by Gu Long. Directed by Li Wenyan, the series was first broadcast on Beijing Television from May 2003 to June 2003. It starred Nicky Wu, Yu Bo, Athena Chu, and Ma Yashu.

== Synopsis ==
Xiao Shiyilang, a youxia, inadvertently finds the Deer-Cutting Dagger, a long-lost legendary weapon, and gets drawn into the conflicts of the wulin. He also meets and starts a romantic relationship with Shen Bijun, but she has already been engaged to Lian Chengbi, who comes from a reputable family in the wulin. In order to safeguard her family's honour, Shen Bijun has to give up her feelings for Xiao Shiyilang and marry Lian Chengbi as agreed earlier.

Lian Chengbi becomes increasingly suspicious of Shen Bijun's fidelity and starts seeing Xiao Shiyilang as his love rival. Meanwhile, the Marquis Xiaoyao, who is an outcast of the Lian family, seeks power in the wulin and wants to take revenge against the Lians for abandoning him. He hopes to find the Deer-Cutting Dagger as it is the only weapon that can counter his "evil" fighting skills. The dagger has already been passed by the Shens to the Lians as part of Shen Bijun's dowry when she married Lian Chengbi. However, the Shen family's matriarch spreads rumours that Xiao Shiyilang has stolen the dagger in order to divert attention away from the Shens and Lians, resulting in Xiao Shiyilang becoming Xiaoyao's target.

Fed up with Shen Bijun's constant meetings with Xiao Shiyilang and suspecting that they are having an affair, Lian Chengbi divorces his wife and turns hostile towards the pair. Lian Chengjin, Lian Chengbi's sister, initially has a crush on Xiao Shiyilang. Upon learning whose Xiao Shiyilang's true love is, Lian Chengjin feels so scorned that she marries one of Xiaoyao's henchmen. Xiaoyao takes advantage of Lian Chengjin's naïvety and the conflict between Lian Chengbi and Xiao Shiyilang to carry out his revenge by attacking and destroying the Lian family's stronghold and robbing them of the dagger.

Devastated by the destruction of his family's legacy, Lian Chengbi sinks into depression. Shen Bijun, feeling sorry for Lian Chengbi, reconciles with her ex-husband, and convinces Xiao Shiyilang to put aside his past differences with Lian Chengbi and help him rebuild the Lian family. Together, Xiao Shiyilang and Lian Chengbi figure out the secret behind the dagger and team up to defeat Xiaoyao.

Just as the conflict is resolved, Xiao Shiyilang finds himself in the crosshairs of the jealous Lian Chengbi again. In order to increase his power, Lian Chengbi has learnt Xiaoyao's "evil" fighting skills and become increasingly evil. Left with no choice, Xiao Shiyilang, with Shen Bijun by his side, faces Lian Chengbi in a final confrontation and eventually defeats him.

== Cast ==
- Nicky Wu as Xiao Shiyilang
- Athena Chu as Shen Bijun
- Yu Bo as Lian Chengbi
- Ma Yashu as Feng Siniang
- Wan Hongjie as Yang Kaitai
- Liu Sitong as Lian Chengjin
- Yu Zhen as the Marquis Xiaoyao
- Yang Junyi as Lingjiu
- Zhang Jin as Xueying
- Zheng Yuzhi as the Shen family matriarch
- Cui Zhemin as Sima Xiang
- Gong Xiaohui as Susu
- Li Qian as Xiaogongzi
- Sun Baoguang as Baiyang
- Shao Feng as Lüliu
- Zhang Zhichao as Niqiu
- Cao Xiwen as Xiaoxiang
