= Escape Plan 2: Hades =

2018 film by Steven C. Miller

- Official DVD/Blu-ray cover
- Directed by: Steven C. Miller
- Written by: Miles Chapman
- Produced by: Robbie Brenner; Mark Canton; Randall Emmett; George Furla; Zack Schiller
- Starring: Sylvester Stallone; Dave Bautista; Huang Xiaoming; Jaime King; Jesse Metcalfe; Wes Chatham; Titus Welliver; Curtis Jackson
- Cinematography: Brandon Cox
- Edited by: Vincent Tabaillon
- Music by: The Newton Brothers
- Production companies: Summit Entertainment; Grindstone Entertainment Group; Emmett/Furla/Oasis Films; The Fyzz; Leomus Pictures; Ingenious Media
- Distributed by: Lionsgate Home Entertainment
- Release date: June 29, 2018 (United States)
- Running time: 96 minutes
- Country: United States
- Language: English
- Budget: $20 million
- Box office: $17.6 million

Escape Plan 2: Hades is a 2018 American prison action thriller film directed by Steven C. Miller. It is the sequel to the 2013 film Escape Plan, and the second installment in the Escape Plan film series. It stars Sylvester Stallone and Curtis Jackson reprising their roles from the first film, with Dave Bautista, Huang Xiaoming, Jaime King, Jesse Metcalfe, Titus Welliver, and Wes Chatham joining the cast. Escape Plan 2: Hades was released straight-to-DVD in the United States but received theatrical releases in such countries as Russia on June 28, 2018, and in China on June 29, 2018. The film received negative reviews from critics; it grossed $17.6 million in some theaters and $4.2 million in domestic home market against a production budget of $20 million. A sequel, Escape Plan: The Extractors, was released in 2019.

== Plot ==
Ray Breslin continues to operate his security company to some success, with senior members Hush and Abigail and newcomers Shu Ren, Jasper Kimbral, and Luke Graves as field operators. During a hostage rescue mission in Chechnya, Kimbral, trusting his computer algorithms, deviates from the mission objectives. This results in one of the hostages being shot, later dying of her wounds; Breslin fires Kimbral as a result.

A year later, Shu is contacted by his family to protect his cousin Yusheng Ma. Soon to announce groundbreaking satellite communications technology from his telecommunications company, Yusheng has been targeted by a rival company, Ruscho. After attending a party in Bangkok, Shu defends Yusheng from masked men, but both are stunned with tasers and kidnapped.

Later, Shu finds himself imprisoned in an unknown arena, where inmates are forced to fight. Shu is forced to brawl another prisoner and wins, and encounters fellow inmate Kimbral, who explains the prison is called HADES, where he has been held for several months. Luke, Hush, Abigail, and Breslin attempt to locate Shu after his and Yusheng's disappearance.

Drawing on Breslin's training to formulate an escape plan, Shu meets the warden Gregor Faust, who calls himself the "Zookeeper", and learns that Faust wants Yusheng's communications patents in exchange for their release. Yusheng tells Shu that he buried the technology for fear it could be used to hijack any nuclear launch system in the world, and they resolve to escape.

Breslin determines that HADES is funded by the same mysterious organization who funded the Tomb, and seeks help from an old contact, Trent DeRosa. While following a lead on Shu's disappearance, Luke is caught and transferred to HADES.

Shu befriends the prison cook named Chu and learns that the prison layout changes every night using a pencil mark on the floor. Kimbral reveals that another inmate, a hacker known as Count Zero who is the leader of the group of hackers called Legion, knows the layout. Shu earns his trust and Count Zero gives him the information, but in doing so reveals his identity. The following day, Shu, Luke, and Kimbral are brought in for questioning and forced to watch as Count Zero is presumably executed. Kimbral reveals that he actually runs HADES; in the year since being dismissed from Breslin's team, he designed and built HADES to prove his algorithms work and that his prison is literally inescapable, since it is not operated by human guards but rather by an automatic system. Furthermore, Kimbral also reveals that another purpose of HADES to imprison people with sensitive and valuable intel in order to extract them through torture so Kimbral can sell the intel to the highest bidders. Kimbral vows to make Shu and Yusheng's life a living hell in his prison unless Yusheng gives up the patent but Faust reminds him to focus on acquiring the patent instead of revenge.

Breslin and DeRosa find clues revealing Kimbral's connection to HADES. Knowing Kimbral is out for revenge, Breslin allows himself to be captured and sent to HADES. Using a hidden communication device in his tooth, Breslin stays in contact with Hush while attempting to breach the prison's defenses from the inside. Breslin, Shu, and Luke formulate a new plan while enlisting the help of Yusheng, the cook, Count Zero's friends, and other inmates. They manage to disable the prison's security cameras and, with Hush's help, temporarily shut down Galileo, the prison's automated defense system. They break into the medical center and attempt to gain control of the prison's systems and get to the control room. The Zookeeper responds with an armed force, and in the ensuing shootout, several inmates are killed and the group becomes separated. DeRosa, following his own leads, locates the prison from the outside.

Yusheng overrides the prison's power systems, alerting DeRosa to the prison's entrance and allowing him to break in. Searching for an exit, Shu kills the Zookeeper in a knife fight as Luke and DeRosa converge on the control room. Breslin faces off with Kimbral in hand-to-hand combat while DeRosa rescues Luke from the prison guards. Breslin defeats Kimbral and together with DeRosa disables Galileo for good. Shu and Yusheng find an exit and are safely extracted by Abigail and Hush. Breslin is contacted by the group behind HADES, and vows to track them down and expose them.

== Cast ==
- Sylvester Stallone as Ray Breslin, the head of Breslin Security
- Dave Bautista as Trent DeRosa, a former associate of Breslin Security
- Huang Xiaoming as Shu, a protégé of Breslin who ends up a prisoner in HADES
- Jaime King as Abigail Ross, the Vice President of Breslin Security
- Jesse Metcalfe as Luke, another protégé of Breslin
- Wes Chatham as Jasper Kimbral, a Breslin protégé who is dismissed by Breslin for insubordination during a rescue mission
- Lydia Hull as Jules, an employee of Breslin Security
- Pete Wentz as "Bug"
- Shea Buckner as Larry, a member of the Legion hacker collective in HADES
- Tyler Jon Olson as Moe, a member of the Legion hacker collective in HADES
- Chen Tang as Yusheng Ma, Shu's cousin who ends up a prisoner in HADES
- Titus Welliver as Gregor Faust, the Zookeeper of HADES
- Curtis Jackson as "Hush", a computer hacker working for Breslin
- Tyron Woodley as Akala, a prisoner of HADES
- Zeeko Zaki as MDLF Soldier
- Vincent Young as Curly, a member of the Legion hacker collective in HADES

== Production ==
Development was first announced in October 2016, with Sylvester Stallone returning to star. It was announced in February 2017 that Steven C. Miller would helm the film, and that there was potential for Arnold Schwarzenegger to reprise his role from the first. Chinese film production company Leomus Pictures was set as a co-financer for the film. In March 2017, Dave Bautista, Jaime King and 50 Cent were added to the cast, with the additions of Jesse Metcalfe, Pete Wentz and Wes Chatham later in the month.

By March 22, Principal photography had begun in Atlanta, Georgia, with Stallone sharing a video from the set and revealing the title as Escape Plan 2: Hades, as well as announcing a third film was in development. Tyron Woodley was revealed as part of the cast in April.

== Reception ==
On the review aggregator website Rotten Tomatoes, 7% of 27 critics' reviews are positive, with an average rating of 2.5/10. The website's consensus reads: "Do not enter."

David Ehrlich of IndieWire gave the film a "D−" and wrote: "Hades might boast some decent star power, but there isn't a celebrity in the world who could save this bargain bin nonsense from feeling like a bootlegged ripoff of its own franchise. Not even Arnold Schwarzenegger, who faced off against Stallone in the first one, could have rescued this from abject boredom."

Kenneth Seward Jr of IGN gave Escape Plan 2: Hades 4.8 out of 10 and said that "[the film] fails to recapture what made the previous film a decent watch".

Stallone himself opined that it was the "most horribly produced film" of his career.

== Sequel ==
A third film entered the early stages of development even before Escape Plan 2: Hades wrapped filming. Stallone was again signed on to reprise his role as Ray Breslin. Dave Bautista also signed on to reprise his role in Escape Plan: The Extractors and filming began in September 2017. Escape Plan: The Extractors had a smaller production budget, but received more positive reviews compared to the second film.
