= Sarah Mezzanotte =

American actress

Sarah Mezzanotte is an American actress. She is known for playing Marnie in the Netflix series Chambers. She is a co-recipient of the 2017 Obie Award for Best Ensemble for her work in Sarah DeLappe's The Wolves. She also received a special Drama Desk Award for Outstanding Ensemble for her work in The Wolves.

== Select filmography ==
- Blue Bloods (2017)
- Blame (2017)
- Central Park (2017)
- Drunk Bus (2020)
