= Lilli Kay =

American actress

- Occupation: Actress
- Years active: 2012–present
- Father: Stephen Kay
- Relatives: Piper Perabo (stepmother)

External image
- Kay as Fia Baxter in Your Honor (2023)

Lilli Kay is an American actress. She is known for her roles as Penelope Fowler in the Netflix series Chambers (2019) and Sofia "Fia" Baxter in the Showtime drama series Your Honor (2020–2023). She also appeared on the fifth season of the Paramount Network neo-Western drama series Yellowstone (2022). In 2025 she appeared as “Zero” in the Apple TV+ sports comedy Stick.

== Career ==
Kay starred as Fia Baxter opposite Bryan Cranston and Michael Stuhlbarg in Showtime drama series Your Honor, becoming a series regular in season two. She also appeared in the film Paterno and Netflix series Chambers.

She has a recurring role as Clara Brewer in Yellowstone in season five. She was involved in the first non-heterosexual kiss on the show, kissing her real-life partner, Juli Kocemba.

Kay played Rachelle Horowitz in the film Rustin opposite Colman Domingo, Chris Rock and Jeffrey Wright. She can be seen in indie feature film The Luckiest Man in America opposite Paul Walter Hauser. In June 2024, she was cast in an Apple TV+ golf-based comedy series Stick from Jason Keller, starring Owen Wilson.

== Personal life ==
She is also a musician and a member of the LGBTQIA+ community. On the television series Yellowstone, she worked alongside her father Stephen Kay who is a director and executive producer on the series. Her stepmother Piper Perabo also acted in the series.

== Filmography ==
Key
†	Denotes works that have not yet been released

Year	Title	Role	Notes
2012	Blue Eyed Butcher	Receptionist at Psychiatrics	Television film (uncredited)
2018	Paterno	Dori	Television film
2019	Madam Secretary	Ruby	Episode: "The New Normal"
2019	Chambers	Penelope Fowler	Main role; 10 episodes
2020–2023	Your Honor	Fia Baxter	Main role
2022	August at Twenty-Two	Emily Walker	
2022–2024	Yellowstone	Clara Brewer	Recurring role
2023	Rustin	Rachelle	
2024	The Luckiest Man in America	Lisa	
2024	The Heiress	Christina Onassis	Short film
2025	For Worse	Tina	
2025	Stick	Zero	Series regular
2025	Task	Frankie Grasso	Guest Star
