= Stephen Kay =

American actor, director and writer of film and television

- Born: 1963 (age 62–63); New Zealand
- Education: Brown University
- Occupations: Actor; director; screenwriter
- Years active: 1986–present
- Spouse: Piper Perabo (m. 2014)
- Children: Lilli Kay

Stephen T. Kay (born 1963) is a New Zealand actor, director, and writer of film and television.

== Career ==
He was a native of Morristown, New Jersey and graduated from Brown University.

He has directed the films Get Carter and Boogeyman, as well as directing episodes of Saved, The Shield, Friday Night Lights, Sons of Anarchy, Quantico, The Punisher, Yellowstone, Coyote, Big Sky, Mayor of Kingstown, 1883, Lioness, and Landman. Beginning his career as an actor, his acting credits include Quantum Leap, Murder, She Wrote, Party of Five and regular roles in Deadly Games and General Hospital.

== Personal life ==
In 2013, Kay became engaged to Piper Perabo, star of Covert Affairs, a show Kay directed and produced. They wed on July 26, 2014, in New York City.

Kay had previously dated Desperate Housewives actresses Teri Hatcher and Eva Longoria, whom he had directed in the 2004 television movie The Dead Will Tell, for about a year each – Longoria in 2004 and Hatcher during 2006–07. He has a daughter Lilli Kay, from a previous relationship.

== Filmography ==
=== Film ===
| Year | Title | Role | Notes |
|---|---|---|---|
| 1986 | The Zero Boys | Soldier #2 | Actor |
| 1992 | Lethal Weapon 3 | Movie Director | Actor |
| 1994 | Angel 4: Undercover | Devon | Actor |
| 1998 | October 22 | Singer | Actor |
| 1999 | The Mod Squad | Bald Dude | Actor |
| 2000 | Get Carter | —N/a | Director |
| 2001 | Angel Eyes | Tony Pindella | Actor |
| 2005 | Boogeyman | —N/a | Director |
| 2011 | Cell 213 | —N/a | Director |
| 2011 | Isolation | —N/a | Director |

=== Director on Television ===
| Year | Title | Role | Notes |
|---|---|---|---|
| 1990 | Thirtysomething | Editor | Episode: "Going Limp" |
| 1991 | Quantum Leap | Ralph | Episode: "Permanent Wave" |
| 1992-2003 | General Hospital | Reginald Jennings | 30 episodes |
| 1993 | Murder, She Wrote | Vincent Polaski | Episode: "Dead to Rights" |
| 1996 | Murder, She Wrote | Darren Crosley | Episode: "Something Foul in Flappieville" |
| 1995 | Deadly Games | Peter Rucker | 13 episodes |
| 1997 | Party of Five | Hawkins | Episode: "Permanent Wave" |
| 2000 | Wasted | Director | TV film |
| 2004-2008 | The Shield | Director | 6 episodes |
| 2004 | The Dead Will Tell | Director | TV film |
| 2005 | The Hunt for the BTK Killer | Director | TV film |
| 2005 | The Commuters | Director | TV film |
| 2006 | Saved | Director | 3 episodes |
| 2006-2009 | Friday Nights Lights | Director | 3 episodes |
| 2008 | Dirt | Director | Episode: "Dirty, Slutty Whores" |
| 2008-2010 | Sons of Anarchy | Director | 7 episodes |
| 2009 | Life on Mars | Director | Episode: "Revenge of Broken Jaw" |
| 2010 | My Generation | Director | Episode: "On the Road |
| 2011 | The Craigslist Killer | Director | TV film |
| 2011 | Justice for Natalee Holloway | Director | TV film |
| 2011-2014 | Covert Affairs | Director | 15 episodes |
| 2012 | Blue Eyed Butcher | Director | TV film |
| 2014 | Those Who Kill | Director | Episode: "Untethered" |
| 2015 | The Lizzie Borden Chronicles | Director | 2 episodes; miniseries |
| 2015 | Quantico | Director | 2 episodes |
| 2016 | Harley and the Davidsons | Director | Episode: "Race to the Top"; miniseries |
| 2017 | Wisdom of the Crowd | Director | Episode: "Trojan Horse" |
| 2018 | Taken | Director | Episode: "Quarry" |
| 2018 | Six | Director | Episode: "The Reckoning" |
| 2019 | The Punisher | Director | Episode: "Collision Course" |
| 2019-2022 | New Amsterdam | Director | 2 episodes |
| 2019-2022 | Yellowstone | Director | 15 episodes |
| 2021 | Coyote | Director | 2 episodes |
| 2021 | Big Sky | Director | Episode: "All Kinds of Snakes" |
| 2022-2023 | Mayor of Kingstown | Director | 8 episodes |
| 2024 | Lioness | Director | 4 episodes |
| 2024-2026 | Landman | Director | 16 episodes |
| 2026 | The Hunting Party | Director | Episode: "Colette Akins" |
