= Shea Buckner =

American Olympian water polo player and actor

Personal information
- Born: Huntington Beach, California
- Height: 6 ft 3 in (1.91 m)

Sport
- Country: United States
- Sport: Water Polo

Shea Buckner (born December 12, 1986) is an American Olympian water polo player and actor. He is known for The Rookie (2023), The Blacklist (2021), The Equalizer (2021), Power Book II: Ghost (2020), Mom (2018), Animal Kingdom (2016), Survive the Night (2020), Get Christie Love (2017), Escape Plan: The Extractors (2019), and Escape Plan 2: Hades (2018). He won two NCAA Championships while playing for the University of Southern California. He also competed for the United States national team at the 2012 Summer Olympics.

== Career ==
=== High school ===
Buckner played water polo at Villa Park High School, where he scored 364 career goals. He was named to the All-American first team twice. In 2004, he was the CIF Division II Player of the Year, Orange County Register Player of the Year, and Century League MVP.

=== College ===
Buckner started his college career at the University of California in 2005. He scored 22 goals that season. He then transferred to the University of Southern California and did not compete in 2006. In 2007, he scored 24 goals to rank second on the team.

In 2008, Buckner scored 42 goals to rank second on the team again. He helped USC win the NCAA Championship, scoring three goals in the final match against Stanford. He was also named to the All-American first team and the NCAA Tournament first team. The following year, Buckner led the Trojans with 44 goals. He was again named to the All-American first team and the NCAA Tournament first team, and USC repeated as national champions.

=== International ===
Buckner played for the U.S. national team at the 2010, 2011, and 2012 FINA World League Super Finals, the 2011 FINA World Championships, and the 2012 Summer Olympics. He scored two goals at the Olympics, as the U.S. finished in eighth place.

=== Professional ===
Buckner plays professionally for Italy's Latina Pallanuoto.

== Personal ==
Buckner was born in Huntington Beach, California, on December 12, 1986. He is 6 feet, 3 inches tall. He resides in Villa Park, California. Two of his siblings, Patrick and Shannon, played water polo for USC.
