= Escape Plan: The Extractors =

2019 film by John Herzfeld

- Official DVD/Blu-ray cover
- Directed by: John Herzfeld
- Screenplay by: Miles Chapman; John Herzfeld
- Produced by: Robbie Brenner; Mark Canton; Randall Emmett; George Furla; Zack Schiller
- Starring: Sylvester Stallone; Max Zhang; Dave Bautista; Devon Sawa; Jaime King; Malese Jow; Harry Shum, Jr.; Russell Wong; Lydia Hull; Curtis Jackson
- Cinematography: Jacques Jouffret
- Edited by: Sean Albertson
- Music by: Victor Reyes
- Production companies: Summit Entertainment; Grindstone Entertainment Group; Emmett/Furla/Oasis Films; Diamond Film Productions; Leomus Pictures; The Fyzz; Ingenious Media; MoviePass Films; Highland Film Group
- Distributed by: Lionsgate Home Entertainment
- Release date: July 2, 2019 (United States)
- Running time: 96 minutes
- Country: United States
- Languages: English; Chinese
- Budget: $3.6 million
- Box office: $1.8 million

Escape Plan: The Extractors is a 2019 American prison action thriller film directed and co-written by John Herzfeld, and a sequel to Escape Plan (2013) and Escape Plan 2: Hades (2018). It is the third and final installment in the Escape Plan film series. The film features Sylvester Stallone, Curtis Jackson, Dave Bautista, and Jaime King reprising their roles from the previous films with Max Zhang, Harry Shum, Jr., Malese Jow, and Devon Sawa joining the cast.

The film was released straight-to-DVD in the United States on July 2, 2019, but received theatrical releases in such countries as Russia, Italy, Australia, Turkey, Egypt and Portugal.

Escape Plan: The Extractors received negative reviews, though they were an improvement over the previous film's reception. With a smaller production budget of $3.6 million, it grossed $1.8 million theatrically in some countries and was successful in the home market, having domestically grossed $2.9 million.

== Plot ==
After touring factory locations in Mansfield, Ohio for her father's company, Hong Kong-based Zhang Innovations, Daya Zhang and her entourage are abducted by terrorists despite her bodyguard and head of security Bao Yung attempting to fight them off. The kidnappers leave Yung unconscious with a USB flash drive addressed to security expert Ray Breslin.

In Los Angeles, Breslin crosses paths with Shen Lo, a former Zhang Innovations bodyguard. Both men are after Daya's father Wu Zhang, whose company is responsible for building covert prisons around the world. They meet with Breslin's associates – his girlfriend Abigail, Hush, and Jules – when Yung arrives with the flash drive. It contains a video message from Lester Clark, Jr., Daya's kidnapper and the son of Breslin's former partner; in business with Zhang, Lester, Sr. betrayed Breslin and was sent to his death.

Breslin reaches out to Trent DeRosa, an associate, and they trace the video to a prison compound in Latvia known as “Devil's Station”. Abigail is also abducted, and Wu, having arrived in Mansfield to meet with police, receives a video call from Lester. Seeking revenge for his father's downfall, Lester demands a $700 million ransom, and executes a hostage. Breslin, DeRosa, Jules, Shen, and Yung depart for Latvia to rescue Daya and Abigail.

When Lester threatens the prisoners and kills a hostage, Wong, Zhang Innovations' technology analyst, agrees to give him access to Zhang's technology. Hush surveils the prison by drone, and its thermal imaging camera reveals Lester has created his own black site. Breslin infiltrates the compound through the sewers while Shen and Yung approach the outer walls. Alerted to their presence, Lester leaves Daya atop the wall as bait. Realizing Lester is leading them into a trap, Shen tries to hold position and wait for Breslin, but Yung charges recklessly ahead, and he and Shen are subdued by land mines and kidnapped. Lester reveals that the flash drive was a tracker that led his men to Abigail, and deduces that Shen and Daya are in love. He shoots Yung and taunts Breslin by video call before slitting Abigail's neck with a knife.

Breslin proceeds through the compound, killing several of Lester's henchmen. Shen steals a guard's stun gun as he is taken to the cells, using it to start a fire; he melts his restraints and subdues the terrorist in the smoke. He frees Daya, but they are confronted by more terrorists. DeRosa arrives, killing the terrorists with incendiary rounds. In the ensuing chaos, Shen kills Lester's remaining henchman Silva in a hand-to-hand fight, while rescuing Wong. Trapped in a shootout with Lester in the upper cells, Breslin is wounded and disarmed, but manages to overpower Lester before sliting his neck with a knife and pushing him off of the balcony, avenging Abigail.

Returning to Mansfield, Daya coldly greets her father, now aware of the true nature of his business, before leaving with Shen. DeRosa comforts Breslin over Abigail's death, urging him to forgive himself, while at the same time persuading Breslin to join him in South America; claiming that Breslin owes him one and Breslin decides to retire.

During the ending credits, Yung is revealed to have survived but heavily wounded. He is seen crawling and stumbling through the sewers and proceeds to escape by himself.

Breslin wearing security overalls, carrying a semi automatic weapon, drops through a central shaft from the ceiling into the tunnel sewers, just moments after Yung had already been seen arriving into the same tunnel from a side shaft, seemingly stalking Yung.

== Cast ==
- Sylvester Stallone as Ray Breslin, founder of Breslin Security
- Max Zhang as Shen Lo, a former security guard for Zhang Innovations and Daya's lover
- Dave Bautista as Trent DeRosa, an associate of Breslin's
- Devon Sawa as Lester Clark Jr., the son of Lester Clark, who betrays Breslin in the first Escape Plan film
- Jaime King as Abigail Ross, vice president of Breslin Security and Breslin's girlfriend
- Malese Jow as Daya Zhang, the daughter of Wu Zhang and Shen's lover who is taken captive by Lester Clark Jr.
- Harry Shum Jr. as Bao Yung, the head of security for Zhang Innovations
- Russell Wong as Wu Zhang, the head of Zhang Innovations and Daya's father
- Lydia Hull as Jules, a staff member of Breslin Security
- Curtis Jackson as "Hush", a computer hacker at Breslin Security and Breslin's friend
- Daniel Bernhardt as Silva, one of Lester Jr.'s henchmen
- Jeff Chase as Frankie, one of Lester Jr.'s henchmen
- Shea Buckner as FBI Agent Richland
- Tyler Jon Olson as Boone
- Rob de Groot as Ralf, one of Lester Jr.'s henchmen
- Holland Herzfeld as Sonny, one of Lester Jr.'s henchmen
- Boyang Yang as Wong, one of Daya's coworkers who is also taken captive by Lester Clark Jr.
- Sherri Robertson as Captain Corbin
- Rich Miller as Detective Davis
- Tony Demil as Axel

Vincent D'Onofrio also appears as Lester Clark in archive footage from Escape Plan.

== Production ==
Development was first announced in April 2017, when Stallone said while filming Escape Plan 2: Hades that a third installment in this franchise was on its way. In August 2017, casting was underway for extras and speaking roles. The producers aimed for actors with MMA experience, as there would be potential fight scenes with Stallone and Bautista. Filming began on September 18, 2017, and wrapped on October 13, 2017. The film was originally titled Escape Plan 3: Devil's Station, but by October 2018 the title had been changed to Escape Plan: The Extractors.

The "Devil's Station" prison scenes were filmed inside the Ohio State Reformatory in Mansfield, Ohio.

== Reception ==
On Rotten Tomatoes the film has an approval rating of 25% based on 12 reviews, with an average rating of 4.3/10.

Noel Murray of the Los Angeles Times said that "while this film is better than its predecessor" it lacks the spark of the original and "is, ultimately, just another VOD actioner."

Brian Orndorf of Blu-ray.com gave it B− grade and wrote: "Herzfeld provides pleasingly mean energy, stuffing the effort with violence and anger, even managing to pull off something that's eluded the series up to this point: genuine surprise."
