= Polis (film) =

- Directed by: Steven Ilous
- Written by: Daniel Perea; Steven Ilous
- Produced by: Meagan Judkins; Alex Sanchez; Sonja Mereu
- Starring: Parker Young; Dileep Rao; Mark Kelly
- Cinematography: David Waldman
- Edited by: Simon Carmody; Steven Ilous
- Music by: Electric Youth; Room8
- Production company: SMI Entertainment
- Release date: November 23, 2014
- Running time: 5 min. 28 sec.
- Country: United States
- Language: English
- Budget: $20,000

Polis is a 2014 American science fiction short film directed by Steven Ilous. It was written by Steven Ilous and Daniel Perea. It won the New Regency and Defy Media PROTOTYPE competition in January 2015, the prize for which was a feature development deal at New Regency.

== Synopsis ==
Set in the distant future, Polis is a sci-fi thriller about David Porter, a young telepath whose search for his mother threatens to uncover a utopian society’s horrifying secrets.

== Accolades ==
- 2015: PROTOTYPE Grand Prize Winner
- 2015: Vimeo Staff Pick
- 2015: One Room With a View—Short of the Week (February 9, 2015)
