= Jason Keller (playwright) =

American playwright and screenwriter (born 1968)

- Born: December 12, 1968 (age 57); Indianapolis, Indiana, U.S.
- Other name: Arnell Jesko
- Occupation: Playwright
- Years active: 2002–present
- Partner: Andrea Anders (2015–present)
- Children: 3
- Father: Ron Keller

Jason Keller (born December 12, 1968) is an American playwright and screenwriter. He has also been credited under the anagram pen name of Arnell Jesko. He is a New Harmony Writing Fellowship recipient, a two-time Bronx New Voices nominee, a Satellite Award nominee for Best Original Screenplay, an Oglethorpe Award nominee, and the recipient of an IFJA Hoosier Award.

== Career ==
Keller is the creator and showrunner of the Apple TV+ original series Stick, a half-hour, single-camera comedy that premiered on June 4, 2025. It stars Owen Wilson, Marc Maron, Mariana Treviño, Peter Dagar, Lilli Kay, Judy Greer, and Timothy Olyphant. On June 23, 2025, Apple TV+ announced that it had renewed Stick for a second season. Production on the show began in October 2025. The second season is scheduled to premiere on Apple TV on November 4, 2026, with Emmy Award winner Rhea Seehorn joining the returning cast.

In 2026, it was reported that Keller had originated the screenplay for Isle of Man, an Amazon MGM Studios film starring Channing Tatum and Eve Hewson. Keller co-wrote the film with Bryan Johnson and Reid Carolin, who is directing. He is producing the film and a four-part docuseries about the race alongside Brad Pitt’s Plan B Entertainment, Guymon Casady of Entertainment 360, and Tatum and Carolin's Free Association. Filming took place during the 2026 Isle of Man TT and in County Sligo, Ireland. The TT is widely regarded as the world's most dangerous motorsport event: competitors reach speeds approaching 200 mph on a 37.73-mile circuit of closed public roads lined with walls, houses and telegraph poles. More than 270 competitors have died on the Mountain Course during the TT and other races held there.

Keller also wrote Ford v. Ferrari, which was directed by James Mangold and starred Matt Damon and Christian Bale. The movie was released in November 2019 by 20th Century Fox. It was nominated for four Academy Awards, including Best Picture.

== Early career ==
Keller began his screenwriting career by writing Marc Forster's film Machine Gun Preacher, which was released by Relativity Media in 2011. Keller went on to write Tarsem Singh's film Mirror Mirror, starring Julia Roberts, as well as Mikael Håfström's 2013 action film Escape Plan, starring Arnold Schwarzenegger and Sylvester Stallone. He is also the executive producer of the fifth movie in the Die Hard franchise, A Good Day to Die Hard, starring Bruce Willis. In 2011, it was announced that Keller would collaborate with director Matt Reeves on the adaptation of the Justin Cronin novel The Passage with Ridley Scott producing.

In June 2015, it was reported that Keller's 2006 Black List script A Willing Patriot had been bought by Open Road Films. It was expected to go into production in 2020, with Martin Zandvliet directing and Liam Neeson starring.

In 2022, it was announced that Keller had written the upcoming biopic about famed female Indycar driver Janet Guthrie, who became the first woman to qualify for the Indianapolis 500 in 1977. Hilary Swank will star in the film, which is being produced by Keller, Joel David Moore, Rishi Bajaj, and Philip Schneider. The film is planned for a mid-2026 release.

Keller is also set to make his directorial debut with the feature film La Sombra (The Shadow), from his original screenplay, to be financed by Sherborne Media Finance. The film will be produced by Luillo Ruiz, Gary Raskin, Alastair Burlingham, and Academy Award-nominated producer Robbie Brenner. A fall 2026 production is currently planned, with casting underway.

With co-writer Eric Pfeffinger, Keller wrote The Paladin, which he is producing with David Dobkin and Robbie Brenner. The film is based on a novel by Brian Garfield, and tells the true story of how the British government orchestrated a monumental shift in World War II through a top-secret program which turned a 15-year-old boy into one of England's deadliest assassins.

== Personal life ==
Keller's father is former major league pitcher Ron Keller, who played for the Minnesota Twins. His mother is J Susie Keller (née Westfall), SAG/Aftra TV spokesperson.

Keller has been outspoken about his work to raise awareness of Parental Alienation, a form of psychological manipulation where one parent influences a child to reject the other parent. In various interviews, he has shared his personal experience of losing a daughter to this form of psychological child abuse. Keller also supports The Anti-Alienation Project, a non-profit organization dedicated to advancing children's and parents' rights.

== Filmography ==
- Big Shot: Confessions of a Campus Bookie (2002)
- Machine Gun Preacher (2011)
- Mirror Mirror (2012)
- Escape Plan (2013) (using the pen name Arnell Jesko)
- Ford v Ferrari (2019)
- Stick (2025–present)
- Isle of Man (TBA)
