= Steven Ilous =

American entrepreneur, director, writer, and producer

- Ilous in 2026
- Born: 2 June 1981 (age 45); Seattle, Washington
- Occupations: Entrepreneur; director; screenwriter; producer
- Years active: 1999–present

Steven Ilous (born 2 June 1981) is an American entrepreneur, director, writer, and producer. He is the founder and CEO of Feature (Feature.io), an entertainment technology company behind the racing franchise Lollipop Racing. He began his career in visual effects at Stan Lee Media and worked on over 18 films, including The Matrix Reloaded, The Matrix Revolutions and The Polar Express.

As a director, Ilous's short film Polis won New Regency and Defy Media's PROTOTYPE competition in 2015, earning a first-look development deal at New Regency. In 2016, Mandalay Pictures purchased his science-fiction project Apex.

== Career ==
Ilous has worked independently as well as for some of the leading film makers including Sony Imageworks, New Regency, Legendary, Warner Bros, DreamWorks and 20th Century Fox.

=== Early career and visual effects ===
He began in visual effects at the age of 18 working with Stan Lee at Stan Lee Media, where he became a Senior Animator. He was part of a core team to produce the first ever webisodic animated series using Macromedia Flash. One year later, he became a part of the visual effects team on The Matrix Reloaded and The Matrix Revolutions. In 2004, Ilous helped create facial motion capture technology used in The Polar Express, Monster House, and Beowulf.

=== Directing and writing ===
In 2008, Ilous teamed up with Michael Davidoff, Bill Rosenthal, and Steve Freeman to write The Life and Times of Jimmy Jaxx for 20th Century Fox, an animated series loosely based on the life of Tommy Lee. Ilous then made his directorial debut in commercials with the World of Tanks video game teaser for Gamescom 2011. The video has received over 10 million YouTube views and took 60 artists 60 days to create. He has also directed and produced music videos for Electric Youth, Bloody Beetroots, Theophilous London, Gary Go, and Benny Benassi. His music videos have appeared on MTV, VH1, and CMT. Ilous also created original video content for Kanye West's live tour which debuted at Lollapalooza in 2011.

=== 2088 and Polis ===
In November 2012, Ilous released a proof-of-concept teaser for his sci-fi feature film project 2088. Described as "a visual style reminiscent of Blade Runner", Wired.com summarizes "The brief piece of “found footage” sells a gritty urban vision of the future, when cops from Los Angeles’ Non-Human Crimes Division get squashed by a Transformers-meets-King Kong robotic thug." 2088 was subsequently developed as a feature-length film project.

In January 2015, New Regency and Defy Media announced Ilous and Daniel Perea the winners of their filmmaking competition PROTOTYPE. The two won with their 5-minute short film, Polis, a sci-fi thriller. The competition's prize was a development deal with New Regency to develop Polis into a feature-length film.

In March 2016, Mandalay Pictures purchased Apex, a science-fiction project by Black List writers Dan Frey and Russell Sommer developed with Ilous, who was attached to direct.

=== Feature and Lollipop Racing ===
In 2021, Ilous founded Feature (Feature.io), an entertainment technology company. In July 2024, Feature signed with WME. Ilous is the named inventor on the company's patent applications covering its Smart Content technology, filed in the United States, Europe and Singapore.

Feature's project is Lollipop Racing, a racing franchise combining a 10-episode scripted series with an interactive motorsport game, written and executive produced by David Ayer with showrunner Marisha Mukerjee. In October 2024, Porsche Cars North America announced its participation, integrating the 911 GT3 RS and 911 GT3 R, with Mobil 1 as presenting sponsor.

In May 2026, Lollipop Racing partnered with Bingo Racing to field a Lollipop-liveried Porsche 911 GT3 R in the SRO Japan Cup; the car won Race 2 of its debut round at Sportsland Sugo.

== Filmography ==
=== Feature films ===
| Year | Title | Credit | Notes |
|---|---|---|---|
| 2016 | Poor Boy | Executive Producer | Released |
| TBA | 2088 | Director, writer | Script |
| TBA | Polis | Director, producer, co-writer | In development at New Regency |
| TBA | Apex | Director | Purchased by Mandalay Pictures |
| 2020 | Drunk Bus | Producer | Released |

=== Short films ===
- 2088 (2012) (director, writer, editor, producer, visual effects)
- Polis (2014) (director, co-writer, editor, producer)

=== Television ===
- 20th Century Fox Television Life and Times of Jimmy Jaxx (2008) (Executive Producer, Co-Creator)

=== Commercials ===
- Wargaming – World of Tanks (2011) 10 Million+ views
- Wargaming – World of Warplanes (2013)

=== Other credits ===
- Driven (2001) (Visual Effects Sequence Designer)
- The Matrix Reloaded (2003) (Visual Effects)
- The Matrix Revolutions (2003) (Visual Effects)
- The Polar Express (2004) (Senior Technical Animator)
- All In (2006) (Visual Effects Supervisor)
- Trapped Ashes (2006) (Visual Effects Supervisor)
- Universal Remote (2007) (Visual Effects Supervisor)
- Stiletto (2007) (Visual Effects Supervisor)
- Watchmen (2009) (Visual Effects Supervisor: Digital Concepts Group)
- "Toxic is Dead" for Toxic Avenger (2009) (Director, Producer, Editor, Visual Effects )
- Thule - Short Film (2011) (Visual Effects Supervisor)
- Freerunner (2011) (Visual Effects Supervisor)
- Reign - Short Film (2012) (Visual Effects Supervisor)
- Breaking at the Edge (2013) (Visual Effects Supervisor)
- Savannah (2013) (Visual Effects Supervisor)
- "All the Girls feat. Theophilus London" for Bloody Beetroots (2013) (Director, Producer, Editor, Visual Effects)
- Similo - Short Film (2014) (Visual Effects Supervisor: SMI Entertainment)
- "Innocence" for Electric Youth (2014) (Producer, Visual Effects Supervisor)
- Now Was Once the Future - Short Film (2014) (Visual Effects Supervisor: SMI Entertainment)
- Baby Baby Baby (2015) (Visual Effects Supervisor: SMI Entertainment)

== Public speaking ==
In 2017, Ilous gave a TEDx talk, "The Hidden Power of Questions", at TEDxCulverCitySalon. He spoke at the Outer Edge LA conference in 2023 and presented Lollipop Racing at Avalanche Summit LATAM in 2024 and Avalanche Summit London in 2025.

Ilous has served as a guest lecturer at the USC School of Cinematic Arts along with DJ Hauck. He also acted as Gotland Games Awards judge and guest lecturer from 2009 to 2011 at Gotland University a division of Uppsala University in Sweden, an institution with the first video game education program in Northern Europe.
