= Chambers (TV series) =

2019 Netflix TV Series

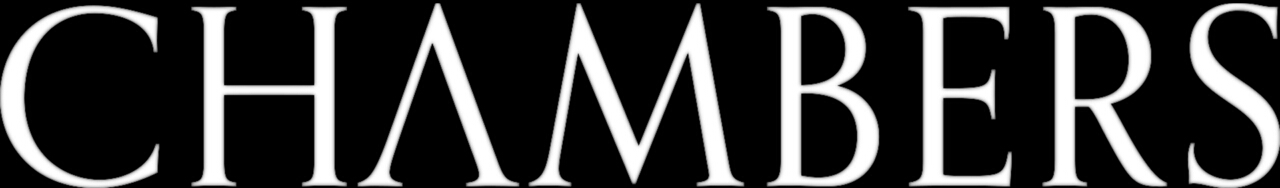
- Genre: Supernatural; Horror; Drama; Thriller; Psychological horror; Mystery
- Created by: Leah Rachel
- Starring: Sivan Alyra Rose; Marcus LaVoi; Nicholas Galitzine; Kyanna Simone; Griffin Powell-Arcand; Lilli Kay; Sarah Mezzanotte; Tony Goldwyn; Uma Thurman
- Composer: James S. Levine
- Country of origin: United States
- Original language: English
- No. of seasons: 1
- No. of episodes: 10

Production
- Executive producers: Leah Rachel; Stephen Gaghan; Akela Cooper; Jennifer Yale; Wolfgang Hammer; Winnie Kemp; Alfonso Gomez-Rejon
- Producers: Karen Moore; Uma Thurman; Andrew Nunnelly; Charmaine DeGraté
- Cinematography: Dana Gonzales; Pepe Avila del Pino; Paul Elliott; Eliot Rockett; Julie Kirkwood; Joseph E. Gallagher
- Editors: Bart Brevé; Joe Leonard
- Camera setup: Single-camera
- Running time: 38–51 minutes
- Production companies: Super Deluxe; Super Emotional

Original release
- Network: Netflix
- Release: April 26, 2019

Chambers is an American supernatural horror television series created by Leah Rachel. The first season, consisting of ten episodes, premiered on Netflix on April 26, 2019. The series stars Sivan Alyra Rose, Marcus LaVoi, Nicholas Galitzine, Kyanna Simone Simpson, Griffin Powell-Arcand, Lilli Kay, Sarah Mezzanotte, Tony Goldwyn and Uma Thurman. In June 2019, the series was cancelled after one season.

== Synopsis ==
Chambers follows the story of a teenager who, after receiving a heart transplant, is haunted by unexplained visions. As the visions grow more troublesome and happen more often, she begins to unravel the horrifying circumstances and conspiracy that led to the donor's mysterious death.

== Cast and characters ==
=== Main ===
- Sivan Alyra Rose as Sasha Yazzie, a young woman who receives Becky's heart during a transplant and is haunted by her spirit.
- Marcus LaVoi as Big Frank Yazzie, Sasha's uncle
- Nicholas Galitzine as Elliot Lefevre, the drug addicted twin brother of Becky.
- Kyanna Simone as Yvonne Perkins, Sasha's best friend
- Griffin Powell-Arcand as TJ Locklear, Sasha's boyfriend.
- Lilli Kay as Penelope Fowler
- Sarah Mezzanotte as Marnie, Becky's best friend and member of Annex.
- Tony Goldwyn as Ben Lefevre, the grieving father of Becky.
- Uma Thurman as Nancy Lefevre, the grieving mother of Becky.

=== Recurring ===
- Lilliya Reid as Becky Lefevre, the deceased daughter of Ben and Nancy.
- Lili Taylor as Ruth Pezim, a spiritual adviser who cofounded Annex, a spiritual organization.
- Matthew Rauch as Evan Pezim, Ruth's husband and cofounder of Annex.
- Jonny Rios as Ravi Jerome, Marnie's boyfriend and Becky's ex-lover.
- Michael Stahl-David as Coach Jones, a school councilor and member of Annex.
- Khan Baykal as Deacon, a member of Annex.
- Richard Ray Whitman as Harrison Yazzie, Sasha's grandfather.
- Patrice Johnson as Tracey Perkins, Yvonne's mother who has Alzheimer's disease.
- Marie Wagenman as young Becky Lefevre, daughter of Ben and Nancy.
- Don Harvey as Johnny "Bail Bonds" Lateke.

== Episodes ==
No.	Title	Directed by	Written by	Original release date
1	"Into the Void"	Alfonso Gomez-Rejon	Leah Rachel	April 26, 2019
2	"Right to Know"	Alfonso Gomez-Rejon	Akela Cooper	April 26, 2019
3	"Bad Inside"	Ti West	Leah Rachel and Travis Jackson	April 26, 2019
4	"2 for 1"	Francesca Gregorini	Randy McKinnon	April 26, 2019
5	"Murder on My Mind"	Dana Gonzales	Rebecca Kirsch	April 26, 2019
6	"With Grace and Gratitude"	Sydney Freeland	Charmaine DeGraté	April 26, 2019
7	"Trauma Bonding"	Geeta V. Patel	Jason Gavin	April 26, 2019
8	"Heroic Dose"	Ti West	Jennifer Yale	April 26, 2019
9	"In the Gloaming"	Tony Goldwyn	Travis Jackson	April 26, 2019
10	"The Crystal Organ"	Lucy Tcherniak	Leah Rachel	April 26, 2019

== Production ==
=== Development ===
On January 10, 2018, it was announced that Netflix had given the production a series order for a first season. The series is created by Leah Rachel, who is credited as an executive producer, alongside Stephen Gaghan, Akela Cooper, Jennifer Yale, Wolfgang Hammer, Winnie Kemp and Alfonso Gomez-Rejon. In March 2019, it was confirmed that the series would premiere on April 26, 2019. On June 18, 2019, Netflix cancelled the series after one season.

=== Casting ===
In May 2018, it was announced that Uma Thurman was cast in the series. In June 2018, Tony Goldwyn joined the series. In December 2018, Sivan Alyra Rose, Lilliya Reid, Nicholas Galitzine, Kyanna Simone Simpson, Lilli Kay, Sarah Mezzanotte and Griffin Powell-Arcand had been cast in the series.

=== Filming ===
Principal photography for the first season began in June 2018 and concluded in November 2018, in Albuquerque.

=== Premiere ===
In March 2019, the series held its official premiere with the screening of the first two episodes at the Series Mania International Festival in Lille, France.

== Release ==
On April 10, 2019, the official trailer for the series was released.

== Reception ==
Based on 38 reviews collected by Rotten Tomatoes, 42% of the critics positively reviewed Chambers, with an average rating of 5.79/10. The website's consensus reads, "Promising performances and an intriguing premise can't keep Chambers' meandering melodrama from getting lost in its own haunted hallways." Metacritic calculated an average score of 48 out of 100 based on 16 reviews, indicating "mixed or average reviews".
