= Drunk Bus =

- Promotional poster
- Directed by: John Carlucci; Brandon LaGanke
- Written by: Chris Molinaro
- Produced by: Eric Hollenbeck; Grant Franklin Fitch; Steven Ilous
- Starring: Charlie Tahan; Kara Hayward; Pineapple Tangaroa; Tonatiuh; Zach Cherry; Sarah Mezzanotte; Dave Hill
- Cinematography: Luke McCoubrey
- Edited by: Taylor Levy
- Music by: Alan Wilkis; Jimmy Stofer; Nathaniel Eras
- Production companies: Ghost+Cow Films; Hollenbeck Film and Experience
- Distributed by: FilmRise
- Release dates: October 15, 2020 (SDIFF); May 21, 2021 (United States)
- Running time: 101 minutes
- Country: United States
- Language: English

Drunk Bus is a 2020 American comedy-drama film directed by John Carlucci and Brandon LaGanke in their directorial debut, and starring Charlie Tahan and Kara Hayward. The film was released on May 20, 2021, and received positive reviews from critics.

== Plot ==
Michael, a recent college graduate, finds himself stuck as a bus driver for a party school in Ohio after failing to pursue his dream of becoming a photographer. He spends his nights driving the "drunk bus," shuttling intoxicated students back to their dorms from parties.

Following a violent incident on the bus, Michael's boss hires Pineapple, an imposing man with Maori face tattoos and piercings, as his security. Despite his initial intimidation, Michael discovers Pineapple's kind and insightful nature. As they spend time together, an unlikely friendship forms, and Pineapple provides Michael with valuable life advice, prompting him to reconsider his perspective.

Simultaneously, Michael deals with the aftermath of a painful breakup while trying to find his place in the world. Amy, his ex-girlfriend, returns to their college town from New York, adding complexity to his emotional journey. Struggling between his past and future, Michael must confront his feelings for Amy and decide on his true desires. As he grapples with these challenges, he faces a critical choice: continue his dead-end job or take a leap of faith to pursue his writing dreams and leave the "drunk bus" behind.

== Cast ==
- Charlie Tahan as Michael, a 20-something driver of a drunk bus
- Kara Hayward as Kat, Michael's friend
- Pineapple Tangaroa as Pineapple, a bodyguard hired for Michael's bus after an altercation.
- Zach Cherry as Josh, Michael's lazy roommate
- Sarah Mezzanotte as Amy, Michael's ex-girlfriend
- Dave Hill as Devo Ted, a drug dealer
- Tonatiuh as Justin
- Martin Pfefferkorn as FU Bob, an elderly passenger Michael helps.
- Frank Iero as Hank Hero
- Dresden Engle as Bus Driver
- Will Forte as Fred, Michael's boss at the depot (uncredited)

== Production ==
Carlucci and LaGanke originally wanted to shoot the film in Kent, Ohio, where they are from, but were convinced by producer Eric Hollenbeck, a native of Elmira, New York, that Rochester, New York would be a cheaper option with a similar aesthetic. Principal photography began on March 1, 2019, in Rochester, and wrapped on March 18.

== Release ==
The film was to have made its worldwide premiere at South by Southwest in March 2020. However, the SXSW Festival was cancelled in response to the COVID-19 pandemic in the United States, thus postponing the premiere of Drunk Bus. On October 15, 2020, the film premiered at the San Diego International Film Festival.

In January 2021, FilmRise acquired North American distribution rights to the film.

== Reception ==
On review aggregator Rotten Tomatoes, the film holds an approval rating of 98% based on 43 reviews, with an average rating of 7.2/10. The website's critics consensus reads, "Fueled by a blend of rowdy comedy and poignant drama, Drunk Bus takes audiences on an uncommonly rewarding coming-of-age journey." According to Metacritic, which assigned a weighted average score of 65 out of 100 based on 11 critics, the film received "generally favorable" reviews.

In her review for The Guardian, Phuong Le praised the "slacker comedy" for its ability to avoid feeling "grating" despite its over-familiar indie elements. She highlighted the film's believable performances and deep understanding of the setting in Kent, Ohio, which lent it a "cheeriness that is both entertaining and heartwarming". She also praised how the portrayal of the character Pineapple skillfully avoided falling into the "Magical Negro" trope. Le rated the film 3 out of 5 stars.

Monica Castillo of RogerEbert.com rated Drunk Bus 3 out of 4 stars and described it as a "sweet, late bloomer coming-of-age comedy". She praised the film's ability to surprise viewers by subverting expectations and highlighted its sincere exploration of trust and healing, as well as the standout performances of the main cast.

Boston Herald rated the film A−. They praised the film's perfect casting, memorable secondary characters, and the standout performance of Pineapple Tangaroa.

Sandy Schaefer of Screen Rant awarded the film three stars out of five, saying: "Thanks to its charming cast and even-handed blend of laughs and drama, Drunk Bus generally succeeds in putting a fresh spin on its familiar story."

=== Accolades ===
Drunk Bus won the Best Narrative Feature Award from both the Jury and the Audience at the 2020 San Diego International Film Festival.
