= George and the Dragon (film) =

2004 film by Tom Reeve

- Directed by: Tom Reeve
- Screenplay by: Tom Reeve and Michael Burks
- Produced by: Adam Beckeridge; Michael Burks; Todd Moyer; Romain Schroeder
- Starring: James Purefoy; Piper Perabo; Michael Clarke Duncan; Patrick Swayze
- Cinematography: Adrian Biddle
- Edited by: Martin Walsh
- Music by: Gast Waltzing
- Production company: Kaleidoscope Home Entertainment Bridge Entertainment
- Release date: 22 October 2004 (Romania)
- Running time: 89 minutes
- Language: English
- Budget: $36 million (estimated)
- Box office: £47,636

George and the Dragon is a 2004 action adventure film based on the legend of Saint George and the Dragon and loosely set in the 12th century. Directed by Tom Reeve and written by Tom Reeve and Michael Burks, the film stars James Purefoy as George and Piper Perabo as Princess Luna.

The film did not receive a wide theatrical release and underperformed relative to its estimated budget.

== Plot ==
A knight returning from crusade, George, bids farewell to his Muslim friend Tarik. George plans to go home and start a farm, while Tarik plans to travel to Spain and find the famous mercenary El Cabillo. Before parting, they incidentally save Father Bernard, a convicted priest who has escaped his hanging, from a pursuing mob. George and Bernard travel to England together.

The king’s daughter, Luna, is carried off by a dragon. Her betrothed, Lord Garth de Guerney, obsessively searches for her. As there are no witnesses and dragons are believed to be a legend, the abduction is blamed on Picts.

George, now alone, returns to the house of his father, Sir Robert. Sir Robert recounts the stories of fighting a dragon when he was younger, and gives George a relic of his battle: a dragon horn. Despite his father’s encouragement to continue his adventures, George is determined to acquire land and establish a smallholding. Robert advises him to visit King Edgar and ask him for land. Unbeknownst to him, he is followed by Wryn, a boy from the village.

Luna has not been harmed by the dragon, who she calls Adelaide, and she defends its cave and its egg from a small group of Picts.

In Spain, Tarik finds El Cabillo but is defeated by him in a duel after El Cabillo cheats, and apparently left for dead. On the road, George encounters Lord Garth, who is impressed by George and takes him to meet the king. George volunteers to accompany the search for Luna along with Garth and the aged guardian of the King’s household, Elmendorf. El Cabillo and his men also travel to England and begin hunting for the princess, hoping for a ransom.

Garth’s party is ambushed by a group of Picts, which they fight off. Elmendorf and George pursue a small group and encounter Wryn, then stumble upon the dragon’s cave. Luna tells them that Adelaide has apparently died from a wound, but Luna is determined to protect Adelaide’s egg, which she has named Smite. She prevents George from destroying it and insists they take it with them.

They arrive at a nunnery, where Bernard is now staying. The nuns reluctantly agree to keep the egg secret. Garth also arrives at the nunnery and is pleased to see Luna safe, but she tells him she will not marry him. Elmendorf confides in George that Garth was selected as Edgar’s successor because he would be a strong ruler, but that Luna only agreed to the betrothal because she was told to.

Unwilling to give up on his dreams of rule, Garth abducts Luna and Bernard, intending to marry her by force and then launch a coup against the king. Bernard reluctantly performs the ceremony in an abandoned castle, but George and Elmendorf arrive before it is concluded, closely followed by El Cabillo. El Cabillo reveals himself to be Tarik, who took the title by defeating the previous El Cabillo. However, Tarik’s second-in-command Bulchar betrays him and the mercenaries attack. During the battle, Smite hatches. Wryn blows the dragon horn, awakening Adelaide.

Garth’s men arrive and attack the mercenaries, followed by the royal army led by King Edgar and Sir Robert. Garth offers George the chance to rule with him, but George refuses, leading to a three-way battle between them and Bulchar. In the confused melee that ensues, Elmendorf sacrifices himself to save Luna and appoints Wryn as his successor.

Finally, Adelaide appears, driving off the mercenaries, but George is trapped inside the ruined keep with the two dragons. George notices the broken lance protruding from Adelaide’s hide and realises that his father was telling the truth about fighting a dragon. He emerges from the keep holding the bloody lance and is hailed as a hero and a saint for slaying the dragon, but a furious Luna rides off. George pursues her and is intercepted by Garth. As they battle in the shallows of a lake, Adelaide appears and devours Garth. Luna realises that George in fact saved Adelaide by removing the lance.

George and Luna agree that the dragons’ survival must remain a secret, and George throws the dragon horn into the lake to stop it being used again. Luna then asks that they travel to investigate rumours of a unicorn near Glastonbury.

== Cast ==
- James Purefoy as George, a knight returning home from the Crusades.
- Piper Perabo as Princess Luna, the daughter of King Edgar, who is carried off by the dragon.
- Patrick Swayze as Lord Garth de Guerney, an ambitious nobleman who is betrothed to Luna and therefore de facto heir to King Edgar.
- Michael Clarke Duncan as Tarik, a Muslim friend of George.
- Bill Treacher as Elmendorf, the elderly Guardian of the King's Household.
- Jean-Pierre Castaldi as Father Bernard, a priest who fortuitously escapes execution in the film's opening.
- Paul Freeman as Sir Robert, George's father, who has lost both legs and claims to have fought a dragon in his youth.
- Rollo Weeks as Wryn, a young man from Sir Robert's village with a taste for adventure.
- Simon Callow as King Edgar.
- Stefan Jürgens as Bluchar, a ruthless mercenary who serves as El Cabillo's second-in-command.
- Joan Plowright as Mother Superior Margaret, an old friend of Bernard's.
- Val Kilmer (uncredited) as El Cabillo, a mercenary captain.

== Comparison to the legend ==
The story of the film bears virtually no resemblance to the traditional legend of Saint George. In Christian hagiography, St. George was a Roman soldier who lived in the 3rd-4th century AD and encountered the dragon in Asia or Africa. The film does not specify a date, but is set during the Crusades and takes place mostly in Britain. Although the story is repeatedly stated to take place in England, much of the story seems to take place in Scotland, with repeated reference to the Grampians, the presence of the Picts, the name of King Edgar, and an implication at the film's end that the dragon becomes the Loch Ness Monster.

== Release ==
The film was released in cinemas in Romania on 22 October 2004.

=== Home media ===
It received a streaming release on Amazon Prime on 21 April 2017.

=== Critical response ===
The film did not attract critical notice. It has a "Popcornometer" user score of 48% with an average rating of 3.2 out of 5 stars, with user reviews generally praising the performances and finding the film entertaining but criticising some of the writing, plot and CGI. No reviews by professional critics are listed. On Letterboxd it has an average rating of 2.85 out of 5 stars.

On Amazon Prime it has an average rating of 3.9 out of 5 stars, out of 60 ratings.

=== Accolades ===
The film score by Gast Waltzing was awarded Best Score at the 2005 Luxembourg Film Awards.
