= Piper Perabo =

American actress (born 1976)

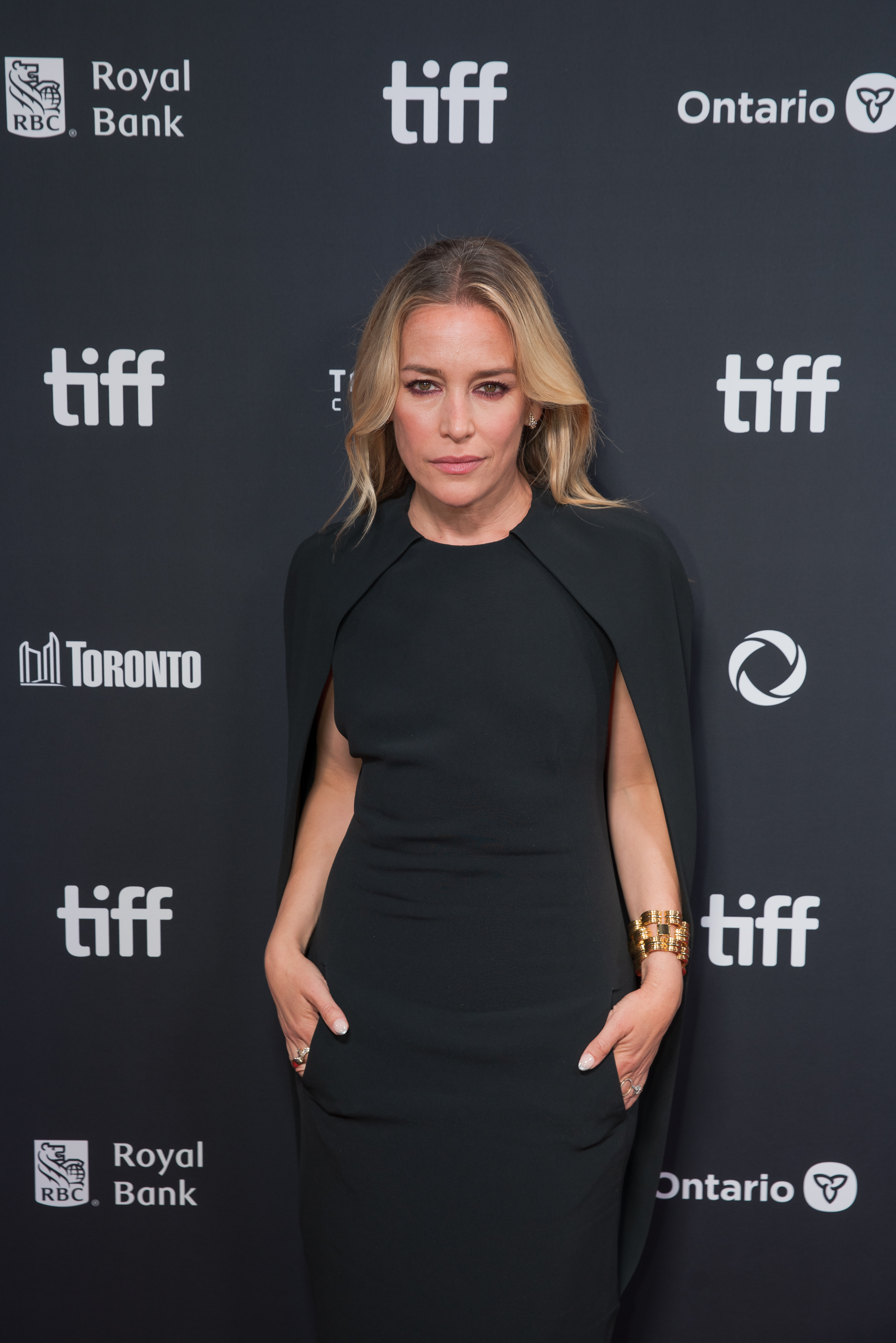
- Perabo at the 2025 Toronto International Film Festival
- Born: Piper Lisa Perabo; October 31, 1976 (age 50); Dallas, Texas, U.S.
- Education: Ohio University (BFA)
- Occupation: Actress
- Years active: 1997–present
- Spouse: Stephen Kay (m. 2014)
- Relatives: Lilli Kay (stepdaughter)

Piper Lisa Perabo (/ˈpɛrəboʊ/ PERR-ə-boh; born October 31, 1976) is an American actress. Following her breakthrough in the comedy-drama film Coyote Ugly (2000), she has starred in films including Lost and Delirious (2001), Cheaper by the Dozen (2003), its sequel Cheaper by the Dozen 2 (2005), The Prestige (2006), The Lazarus Project (2008), Looper (2012) and Angel Has Fallen (2019). She starred as CIA agent Annie Walker in the USA Network spy drama series Covert Affairs (2010–2014), for which she was nominated for a Golden Globe Award for Best Actress – Television Series Drama, Her other television work includes Yellowstone (2021–2024), Billions (2021–2023) and Butterfly (2025).

== Early life ==
Born in Dallas, Texas and raised in Toms River, New Jersey, Perabo is the child of Mary Charlotte (née Ulland), a physical therapist, and George William Perabo, a lecturer in poetry at Ocean County College. She is of English, German, and Irish (father) and Norwegian (mother) descent; her surname is sometimes mistakenly described as Portuguese.

Perabo's parents named her after actress Piper Laurie. She is the eldest of three children with two brothers, Noah and Adam. She graduated from Toms River High School North in 1994, and earned a bachelor's degree in theater from Honors Tutorial College at Ohio University in 1998. In 1996, she attended the Trinity/La MaMa Performing Arts Program. She also studied Latin, physics, and poetry in her final year.

Perabo was first noticed a year before she graduated from college. She was in New York City, visiting her then-boyfriend, and accompanied him to an audition. Casting director Denise Fitzgerald spotted her and asked her to read for a part. She was not cast, but when Fitzgerald found out that she did not have any representation, she made phone calls on Perabo's behalf and found her an agent.

== Career ==
=== 1997–2007: Beginning and breakthrough ===
After graduating, Perabo moved to New York, where she worked as a waitress. She also studied acting at the Maggie Flanigan Studio and the La MaMa Experimental Theatre Club and had roles in various plays. She was cast in her first feature film just a month after moving to the city, Marc Levin's comedy Whiteboyz. In 2000, she was cast in the romantic musical comedy-drama film Coyote Ugly as Violet "Jersey" Sanford, for which she won an MTV Movie Award for Best Music Moment for "One Way or Another". Despite the film's mixed response from critics, it was a box office success, grossing over $113 million worldwide. She also appeared in The Adventures of Rocky and Bullwinkle as FBI agent Karen Sympathy.

After the success of Coyote Ugly, Perabo decided to focus on independent films. In 2001, she starred in an independent Canadian drama called Lost and Delirious, playing a boarding school student who falls in love with a female classmate (played by Jessica Paré). The film was met with mixed reviews, but the performances of Perabo, Paré and co-star Mischa Barton were widely praised. Perabo's performance in particular received critical acclaim; Loren King of the Chicago Tribune called it her "breakout performance". Entertainment Weekly's Owen Gleiberman called her "an actress of glittering ferocity" and her performance "a geyser of emotion". Jim Lane of the Sacramento News & Review said that "Perabo is a revelation, wild and fiery — it's a breakthrough performance, astonishing in its fervency" and Roger Ebert praised her performance for its sincerity and "wonderful abandon and conviction".

The next year she starred as a French exchange student in the independent comedy Slap Her... She's French, which was shelved in North America for two years, then released under the new title She Gets What She Wants. The film was released under its original title in Europe. She had a role as the eldest Baker child, Nora, in Cheaper by the Dozen (2003), a role she reprised in the film's 2005 sequel. Her other films include The I Inside (2003), Perfect Opposites (2004), George and the Dragon (2004), The Cave (2005), Imagine Me & You (2005), Edison (2005), and The Prestige (2006).

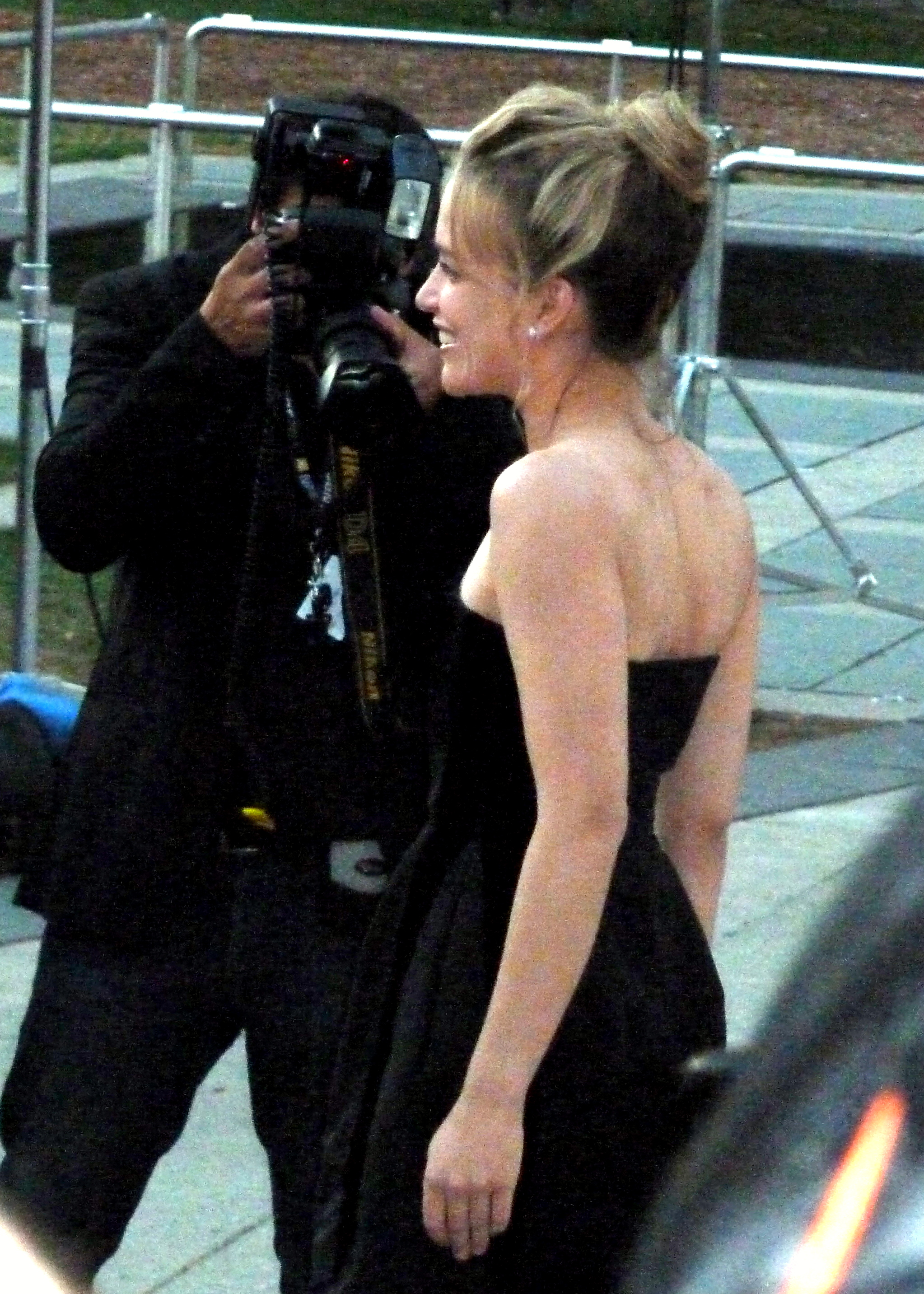
Perabo at the premiere of Looper at the Toronto International Film Festival in 2012

=== 2008–present: Covert Affairs and other work ===
In 2008, Perabo co-starred with Jamie Lee Curtis in the family comedy film Beverly Hills Chihuahua. Also that year, she made her off-Broadway debut in the Neil LaBute play Reasons to Be Pretty. As the play's run was coming to an end, she read the script for the USA Network television spy drama series Covert Affairs: "I was reading movie scripts and I wasn't finding anything that was really speaking to me and my agent suggested that I read [the Covert Affairs script]. And I hadn't thought about doing television, but when I read it, it kind of changed everything for me. She's such a powerful character, she's so smart, the action is so intense, and I really thought it would be fun to do."

The following year, Perabo was cast as CIA field agent Annie Walker, the lead character in Covert Affairs. For her work in the series, she received a nomination for the 2010 Golden Globe Award for Best Actress – Television Series Drama. The series ran for five seasons, from 2010 to 2014.

In September 2012, Perabo had a supporting role, alongside Bruce Willis, Joseph Gordon-Levitt, and Emily Blunt, in the time travel thriller film Looper. In December 2012, she was cast in a recurring role on the sitcom Go On. Her character, Simone, was a former member of Matthew Perry's character's support group, who returned and became his love interest. She was originally scheduled to appear in three episodes, but this was increased to four.

Perabo had a starring role in the thriller Into the Grizzly Maze, which was released in 2015. She starred as Julia George in the ABC drama series Notorious (2016). She co-starred with Antonio Banderas in the thriller film Black Butterfly, which was released in May 2017. In June 2018, it was announced that Perabo was cast as Sara in the Netflix comedy series Turn Up Charlie. Also in 2019, she starred as Leah Banning in the action film Angel Has Fallen. In 2020, she had a recurring role as Linda Craft in the Showtime supernatural horror series Penny Dreadful: City of Angels.

Perabo co-starred as Angela in the 2020 dark comedy film, Spontaneous.

In 2021, Perabo joined the cast of Yellowstone as Summer Higgins, an animal rights activist and ally of John (season 4).

In 2025, she co-starred in the independent Quebec film Peak Everything as Tina, in which she performed in both English and French.

== Personal life ==
In 2013, Perabo became engaged to New Zealand director and writer Stephen Kay; they married on July 26, 2014, in New York City. Perabo is stepmother to Kay's daughter, Lilli.

Perabo has been close friends with actress Lena Headey since they starred together in the 2005 films The Cave and Imagine Me & You. She speaks fluent French, advocates for LGBT rights and women's political leadership, and serves on the advisory board of VoteRunLead. She is part owner of Employees Only, a Prohibition-themed bar in the West Village, that opened in 2005, and Jack's Wife Freda, a SoHo restaurant that opened in 2012.

== Political activism ==
In 2018, Perabo was arrested for protesting Brett Kavanaugh's Supreme Court confirmation hearing. She was also arrested in November 2019 while attending one of Jane Fonda's weekly climate change protests.

Perabo endorsed Elizabeth Warren in the 2020 Democratic Party presidential primaries and regularly uses her Twitter and Instagram accounts to advocate for voter registration and voter education. She has encouraged followers to seek out VoteRiders to learn more about Voter ID requirements.

Perabo is an advisory board member for The Hometown Project, a non-profit organization that works to help elect candidates in local races.

Perabo endorsed Kamala Harris in the 2024 United States presidential election.

== Filmography ==
=== Film ===
Year	Title	Role	Notes
1997	Single Spaced	The Dame	Short
1999	Whiteboyz	Sara	
1999	Knuckleface Jones	That Girl	Short
2000	The Adventures of Rocky and Bullwinkle	FBI Agent Karen Sympathy	
2000	Coyote Ugly	Violet "Jersey" Sanford	
2000	Followers	Girl at Party	
2001	Lost and Delirious	Pauline "Paulie" Oster	
2002	Slap Her... She's French	Genevieve Le Plouff	
2002	Flowers	Iris	
2003	Cheaper by the Dozen	Nora Baker	
2004	Perfect Opposites	Julia Bishop	
2004	The I Inside	Anna	
2004	George and the Dragon	Princess Luna	
2005	Karas: The Prophecy	Yurine (voice)	
2005	Edison	Willow Summerfield	
2005	The Cave	Charlene "Charlie"	
2005	Imagine Me & You	Rachel	
2005	Good Morning Baby	Gabriella	Short
2005	Cheaper by the Dozen 2	Nora Baker-McNulty	
2005	Perception	Jen	
2006	10th & Wolf	Brandy	
2006	First Snow	Deirdre	
2006	The Prestige	Julia McCullough	
2007	Because I Said So	Mae Wilder	
2007	In Vivid Detail	Leslie	Short
2008	Beverly Hills Chihuahua	Rachel Ashe	
2008	The Lazarus Project	Lisa Garvey	
2008	The Prince of Motor City	Meg Riley	TV movie
2009	Sordid Things	Tabitha White	
2009	Carriers	Bobby	
2010	Ashes	Bettina	
2012	Looper	Suzie	
2015	Into the Grizzly Maze	Michelle	
2017	Black Butterfly	Laura	
2018	Tough Love	Woman	Short
2019	Angel Has Fallen	Leah Banning	
2020	Spontaneous	Angela Carlyle	
2025	Peak Everything (Amour Apocalypse)	Tina	

=== Television ===
Year	Title	Role	Notes
2007	House	Honey	Episode: "Resignation"
2009	Law & Order: Criminal Intent	Calista Haslum	Episode: "Folie à Deux"
2010–14	Covert Affairs	Annie Walker	Main Role; 75 episodes
2013	Go On	Simone	Recurring Cast; 4 episodes
2016	Notorious	Julia George	Main Cast, 10 episodes
2016	ABC Fall Preview Special	Herself/Host	1 episode special
2019	Turn Up Charlie	Sara	Main Cast, 8 episodes
2020	Penny Dreadful: City of Angels	Linda Craft	Recurring Cast, 6 episodes
2021	The Big Leap	Paula Clark	Main Cast, 11 episodes
2021–24	Yellowstone	Summer Higgins	Recurring Cast: Season 4–5, 12 episodes
2022–23	Billions	Andy Salter	Recurring Cast: Season 6–7, 10 episodes
2025	Grey's Anatomy	Jenna Gatlin	Guest: Season 21, 3 episodes
2025	Butterfly	Juno Lund	Main Cast, 6 episodes
2026	The Hunting Party	Colette Akins	Episode: "Colette Akins"

=== Stage ===
Year	Title	Role	Notes
2008	Reasons to Be Pretty	Carly	Lucille Lortel Theatre
2015	Lost Girls	Maggie	Lucille Lortel Theatre

== Awards and nominations ==
Year	Award	Category	Work	Result
2001	Blockbuster Entertainment Award	Favorite Female - Newcomer	Coyote Ugly	Nominated
2001	MTV Movie Award	Best Music Moment	Coyote Ugly	Won
2001	MTV Movie Award	Breakthrough Female Performance	Coyote Ugly	Nominated
2004	Teen Choice Award	Choice Movie: Liplock (shared with Ashton Kutcher)	Cheaper by the Dozen	Nominated
2006	Young Artist Award	Best Performance in a Feature Film - Young Ensemble Cast	Cheaper by the Dozen 2	Nominated
2011	Golden Globe Award	Best Actress in a Drama Series	Covert Affairs	Nominated
2011	Gracie Award	Outstanding Female Actor in a Breakthrough Role	Covert Affairs	Won
2017	People's Choice Award	Favorite Actress in a New TV Series	Notorious	Nominated
2022	Screen Actors Guild Awards	Outstanding Drama Series Cast (shared with Yellowstone cast)	Yellowstone	Nominated
