= Central Park (2017 film) =

- Directed by: Justin Reinsilber
- Written by: Justin Reinsilber
- Produced by: Melissa Chamberlain; Justin Reinsilber
- Starring: Ruby Modine; Grace Van Patten; Marina Squerciati; Michael Lombardi
- Cinematography: Eun-ah Lee
- Edited by: Eric Pennycoff
- Music by: Andre Fratto
- Production companies: Feast and Bourbon Films
- Release dates: June 6, 2017 (Los Angeles); February 6, 2019
- Running time: 90 minutes
- Country: United States
- Language: English

Central Park is a 2017 American horror film written and directed by Justin Reinsilber and starring Ruby Modine, Grace Van Patten, Marina Squerciati and Michael Lombardi.

== Cast ==
- Justiin A. Davis as Harold Smith
- Ruby Modine as Sessa
- Malika Samuel as Donna
- Guillermo Arribas as Felix
- Grace Van Patten as Leyla
- Deema Aitken as Mikey
- Charles Borland as Max
- Marina Squerciati as Melissa Shaw
- Michael Lombardi as Daniel Shaw
- Sarah Mezzanotte as Willa
- David Valcin as Sam
- Nicole Balsam as Officer Johnson
- Justin Reinsilber as The Man

== See also ==
- List of ghost films
