= Stick (TV series) =

American sports comedy TV series

- Promotional poster
- Genre: Sports comedy
- Created by: Jason Keller
- Starring: Owen Wilson; Peter Dager; Lilli Kay; Mariana Treviño; Marc Maron; Timothy Olyphant
- Theme music composer: Caamp
- Composer: Zachary Dawes
- Country of origin: United States
- Original language: English
- No. of seasons: 2
- No. of episodes: 14

Production
- Executive producers: Jason Keller; Christopher Moynihan; Ben Silverman; Guymon Casady; Rodney Ferrell; Howard T. Owens; Drew Buckley; Lee Eisenberg; Natalie Sandy; Bill Callahan; Owen Wilson; Valerie Faris; Jonathan Dayton; Jaffar Mahmood
- Producers: Kathy Gilroy; James Thompson III; Blaine Williams
- Cinematography: Corey Walter; Stephen Maier; Jim Denault; Jason Oldak
- Editors: Melissa McCoy; Daniel Gabbe; Ivan Victor; Todd Zelin
- Running time: 29–45 minutes
- Production companies: Propagate; Entertainment 360; Kellerama; Apple Studios

Original release
- Network: Apple TV+
- Release: June 4 – July 23, 2025
- Network: Apple TV
- Release: November 4, 2026 – present

Stick is an American sports comedy television series created by Jason Keller for Apple TV+ and starring Owen Wilson as a former professional golfer who takes a young prodigy under his wing to turn his life around. The series premiered on June 4, 2025. In July 2025, the series was renewed for a second season which premiered on November 4, 2026.

== Premise ==
Pryce Cahill is a long-washed-up professional golfer who sells clubs and coaches at a range, where he encounters Santi Wheeler, a talented young player. After selling his house to afford money, using the excuse that he needs to pay for his new prodigy's career, Pryce travels with Santi, his mother Elena, friend and former caddy Mitts, and club bartender-turned-caddy Zero Duffy by RV across the United States to help Santi rise to fame, improving Pryce's own life in the process.

== Cast ==
=== Main ===
- Owen Wilson as Pryce Cahill, aka "the Stick", a former professional golfer who now works as a golf club salesman and coach
- Peter Dager as Santi Wheeler, a gifted golfer who quit after his father left his mother
- Lilli Kay as Zero Duffy, a genderfluid bartender at Sparling Meadows, who uses she/they pronouns, is a dedicated environmentalist and anti-capitalist, and joins Pryce's group as Santi's caddy
- Mariana Treviño as Elena Wheeler, Santi's mother
- Marc Maron as Mitts, Pryce's friend and former caddy
- Timothy Olyphant as Clark Ross (season 2; recurring season 1), Pryce's former playing partner and rival

=== Recurring ===
- Judy Greer as Amber-Linn, Pryce's ex-wife
- Billy Zane (season 2)
- John Higgins (season 2)

=== Guests ===
- Aaron Douglas as Dale, a customer at Pryce's store
- Donavon Stinson as Ben Putman, Amber-Linn's new boyfriend
- Rob Benedict as Chuck Gray, a participant in a golf tournament Pryce challenges
- Ryan Kiera Armstrong as Angela
- Aidan Merwarth as Jett Cahill (age 18), Pryce's deceased son, who died as a small child and later appears in "what if" scenarios showing how life would be different for Pryce if he had survived
  - Caden Dragomer as Jett Cahill (age 13)
  - Louie Chaplin Moss as Jett Cahill (age 7)
- Mackenzie Astin as Gary Wheeler, Santi's absentee father and Elena's ex-husband
- Jim Nantz as himself, a ReadySafe Invitational commenter
- Trevor Immelman as himself, a ReadySafe Invitational commenter
- Keegan Bradley as himself, a professional golfer at the ReadySafe Invitational
- Wyndham Clark as himself, another professional golfer at the ReadySafe Invitational
- Max Homa as himself, a fellow professional golfer at the ReadySafe Invitational
- Brad Dalke as himself, a professional golfer at the ReadySafe Invitational
- Collin Morikawa as himself, a professional golfer leading the ReadySafe Invitational tournament
- Rhea Seehorn as Amanda (season 2)

== Production ==
It was announced in March 2024 that Owen Wilson was cast to star in the series with Jonathan Dayton and Valerie Faris set as directors. Peter Dager, Marc Maron, Mariana Treviño, Jamie Neumann and Lilli Kay would be added to the cast in the following months. In August, Judy Greer would join the cast to replace Neumann, who exited for unknown reasons. Timothy Olyphant would also join the cast in a guest role capacity.

Filming on the series began on May 29, 2024, in Vancouver under the working title Rambler & the Birdie Machine, and was due to run until September 13. In February 2025, Apple announced the series, now titled Stick On July 23, 2025, Apple TV+ renewed the series for a second season. On February 17, 2026, Olyphant and Greer were promoted to series regulars for the second season. In March 2026, Billy Zane and John Higgins joined the cast in recurring capacities for the second season.

== Release ==
Stick premiered on June 4, 2025. The second season premiered on November 4, 2026.

== Episodes ==
=== Series overview ===
Series overview
Season	Episodes	Originally released		
Season	Episodes	First released	Last released	Network
1	10	June 4, 2025	July 23, 2025	Apple TV+
2	10	November 4, 2026	December 30, 2026	Apple TV

=== Season 1 (2025) ===
No. overall	No. in season	Title	Directed by	Written by	Original release date
1	1	"Pilot"	Valerie Faris & Jonathan Dayton	Jason Keller	June 4, 2025
Pryce Cahill is a former professional golfer working at a golf store and selling golf clubs. His ex-wife, Amber-Linn, pressures him to sell their house. While coaching at the driving range, Pryce sees a young man hitting the ball with incredible accuracy and distance. The player introduces himself as Santi Wheeler. Pryce contacts Santi and his mother, Elena, and suggests that he should take Santi on tour. Elena demands that Pryce pays for all expenses, as well as pays her $100,000. Pryce demands that Amber-Linn pays him $100,000 to sell the house, and explains that it is to support Santi's golf attempts. Before leaving his house, Pryce watches an old home video, showing him and Amber-Linn during their marriage, and with their infant child.
2	2	"Grossweiner's Law"	Valerie Faris & Jonathan Dayton	Jason Keller	June 4, 2025
Pryce takes Santi to buy new golf clubs, and he explains to him the importance of not worrying about previous or future shots. Pryce gets $100,000 from Amber-Linn, and meets her coworker, Ben. Pryce convinces Mitts, his old friend and former caddy, to travel with them, but is arrested for excessive parking tickets. Amber-Linn bails out Pryce, and Pryce learns that Amber-Linn is dating Ben, much to his disappointment. Pryce and Mitts convince Elena and Santi to go on tour with them.
3	3	"Daddy Issues"	David Dobkin	Jason Keller & Christopher Moynihan	June 4, 2025
At their first tournament, Pryce bets on Santi, but becomes disappointed that Santi is not doing well. He proceeds to lecture Santi, which upsets him. Santi leaves the golf course, but gets inspiration from Zero Duffy, a recently fired bartender from the golf course. Mitts becomes stuck in the mobile home bed, and needs to be rescued by Elena. Santi wins his tournament, but is not happy with Pryce's leadership.
4	4	"Zero Sum Game"	David Dobkin	Esti Giordani	June 11, 2025
Pryce attempts to mend his relationship with Santi, who is more interested in spending time with Zero. He confronts Elena over Santi's lack of dedication to golf, and Elena suggests that she holds him to his commitment to practice. Mitts informs Elena that Pryce had a child who died at the age of four from cancer. Pryce goes to a swimming quarry and lectures Santi, who is not receptive of his criticism. That night, Pryce realizes that Santi will only listen to Zero, and hires them to be Santi's caddie.
5	5	"The Birdie Machine"	Jaffar Mahmood	Bill Callahan	June 18, 2025
Pryce teaches Zero to be a caddy and assist Santi in a tournament. Zero opens up to Elena, and reveals their past family struggles. With Zero's help, Santi wins the tournament. At the next campsite, the group gets along, and Zero and Santi kiss.
6	6	"RV Shangri-La"	Jaffar Mahmood	Kate Fodor	June 25, 2025
Zero and Santi practice golf at a campground rest day before the U.S. Amateur Championship, and grow closer. In the locker room, Santi asks Pryce for advice on Zero. Elena pitches a helium business to Mitts, who doesn't answer. Zero and Santi share an intimate moment at the pool. Later, Santi finds Pryce's ring in Zero's bag at the arcade. Pryce recalls his late son Jett and calls his ex-wife Amber-Linn. Santi asks him to play pickleball. Elena tells Mitts she is sick of listening to men her whole life, and encourages him to take a risk. Mitts kisses her unexpectedly and is silent after. At the U.S. Amateur Championship, Pryce and Zero get caught in their lie, and Zero reveals Pryce is paying them to caddy. Feeling betrayed by both, Santi calls Zero a clown, insults Pryce, and storms off.
7	7	"Dreams Never Remembered"	M.J. Delaney	Jason Keller & Bryan Johnson	July 2, 2025
The episode begins with "what if" scenarios, showing Pryce's life with Amber-Linn and their son Jett at different ages, including moments of childhood mischief and teenage rebellion. When he goes to college, Pryce worries about losing contact with him. In the present at a diner, Santi plans to leave with Elena back to Indiana, who tells him Zero really did like him. Santi says he quit golf to test his dad's love and believes he never loved him. At the airport, Pryce arrives, tells Santi that spending time with him was the best part of the past eight weeks. As Santi and Elena board the plane, Santi rushes back to Pryce trying to return his ticket and tells him he wants to compete in the Ready Safe Invitational. Mitts goes to drop Zero at the bus station, and they tell Mitts they feel hurt by Santi's insults and admits they needed the money Pryce paid them. Mitts tells them Santi is also hurting and they should consider his perspective. Zero leaves briefly before Santi arrives to talk to them for their plan.
8	8	"Clark the Mark"	M.J. Delaney	Jimy Shah	July 9, 2025
Episode 8 begins with Clark Ross rehearsing a speech about disliking prepared speeches to promote the Ross Golf Academy. Clark meets with a "reporter," who is actually Zero, and quickly sets up a dinner date. Pryce is also at the bar during this time. At the dinner table, Santi goes up to them in excitement 3 times about going pro and asks Clark for a Sponsor Exemption. Clark dismisses him, getting annoyed, saying he needs to do the hard work first. Pryce interrupts, criticizing Clark for being charming but only ranking 51st in Sawgrass, where Pryce had his "Happy Gilmore" moment. Mitts, planted at the bar, helps set up a shot glass golf game. Clark wins initially, but when Zero whispers to Clark to do another round, Santi gets angry and calls them a clown. Zero gets angry and reveals that Pryce's whole plan was to get Santi the exemption through a hustle. Clark learns Pryce gave Elena $100,000 as part of this plan and agrees to one final match on the green. Pryce wins the match, and Clark has to give him the exemption. The episode ends revealing the entire sequence was a hustle to secure Santi's Sponsor Exemption.
9	9	"Showtime"	John Hamburg	Christopher Moynihan	July 16, 2025
Santi doesn't play well in the first round of the Ready Safe Invitational. After the round, Clark Ross schmoozes Santi and plants seeds of doubt about his future with Pryce, who often takes shortcuts, as his coach. During round 2, Pryce sees Santi doubting himself and advises him to take a shortcut via the fairway of an adjacent hole, and then through the trees to the green of the hole in play (allowed but deemed "insane"). Santi balks at the idea of taking a shortcut, but Pryce makes a case for shortcuts in life, Santi Eagles the hole, makes the cut to round 3 and becomes a media sensation for his wild approach to that hole. Mitts and Elena have much more successful moment, Pryce and Amber-Linn almost do, but think better of the idea. The next morning at the hotel breakfast buffet, a "fan", who turns out to be Santi's father, approaches Pryce. Elena arrives and disapprovingly recognizes her ex/Santi's dad. Santi and Zero also arrive and, after a moment of hesitation, Santi and his dad hug.
10	10	"Déjà Vu All Over Again"	John Hamburg	Ryan Hooper	July 23, 2025

=== Season 2 (2026) ===
No. overall	No. in season	Title	Directed by	Written by	Original release date
11	1	"Sirens in Soft Spikes"	Stephanie Laing	Jason Keller	November 4, 2026
12	2	"Don't Be Summer Mayonnaise"	Stephanie Laing	Jason Keller	November 4, 2026
13	3	"Chip Off the Old Butch"	Jaffar Mahmood	Christopher Moynihan	November 11, 2026
14	4	"The Boog"	Jaffar Mahmood	Christopher Moynihan	November 18, 2026
15	5	"Go Time!"	Kevin Bray	Ryan Hooper	November 25, 2026
16	6	"Jung and the Restless"	Kevin Bray	Esti Giordani	December 2, 2026
17	7	"Bogey Nights"	Silver Tree	Kate Fodor	December 9, 2026
18	8	"Fast Greens Do Not Hold"	Silver Tree	Jason Keller & Esti Giordani	December 16, 2026
19	9	"Let 'er Rip"	Declan Lowney	Bill Callahan	December 23, 2026
20	10	TBA	TBA	Jason Keller & Ryan Hooper	December 30, 2026

== Reception ==
On the first season, the review aggregator website Rotten Tomatoes reported an 81% approval rating based on 62 critic reviews, with an average of rated reviews of 6.7/10. The website's critics consensus reads, "Carried along by Owen Wilson's laconic charm, Stick is a sports comedy that putts predictably but accomplishes its aim of gentle entertainment commendably under par." Metacritic, which uses a weighted average, gave a score of 62 out of 100 based on 27 critics, indicating "generally favorable".

The second season holds a 100% approval rating on review aggregator Rotten Tomatoes, based on 13 critic reviews with an average of rated reviews of 7/10.
