= Robbie Brenner =

American media executive, head of Mattel Studios

- Brenner at the 2026 premiere of The Housewife
- Occupations: President and chief content officer of Mattel Studios, Film producer
- Notable work: Barbie, Dallas Buyers Club

Robbie Brenner is an American film and television producer and media executive currently working at toy and entertainment company Mattel. She was appointed head of its filming division, Mattel Films, on September 6, 2018 until June 2, 2025, when Mattel elevated her to her current position as president and chief content officer of Mattel Studios, as part of a combination with its Mattel Television division.

Brenner produced the live-action adaptation of the Mattel fashion doll, Barbie, which was directed and co-written by Greta Gerwig and was released on July 21, 2023, by Warner Bros. Pictures; it grossed over $1.4 billion and set numerous global box office records.

== Career ==
Brenner worked as a partner at The Firm and as president of its film division. Miramax Films for nine years. While at Miramax, she worked on numerous films including Serendipity, starring John Cusack and Kate Beckinsale. In 2004, Brenner produced the film Haven, a Cayman Islands crime drama featuring Orlando Bloom, Bill Paxton, and Zoe Saldaña. Brenner went on to work at Twentieth Century Fox as senior vice president of production in 2005 and 2006. After her time there, she was with Davis Entertainment and produced the science fiction film Aliens vs. Predator: Requiem. Previously as an independent producer, Brenner earned a 2013 Best Picture Oscar nomination for Dallas Buyers Club. This film won three 3 Academy Awards, including Best Actor for Matthew McConaughey and Best Supporting Actor for Jared Leto.

Before her work at Mattel Films, Brenner served as president of production at Relativity. While there, she helped manage the studio's acquisition of the Sundance documentary Catfish. She also led production on movies such as Immortals, Safe Haven, Mirror, Mirror, Out of the Furnace, and The Fighter, among others.

Brenner appeared at No. 96 in The Hollywood Reporter's "Women in Entertainment 2012: Power 100."

Brenner is a film alumnus of New York University’s Tisch School of the Arts and a member of the Academy of Motion Picture Arts and Sciences Executive Branch.

== Filmography ==
She was a producer in all films unless otherwise noted.

=== Film ===
Year	Film	Credit	Notes
2001	Serendipity	Co-executive producer	
2001	On the Line	Executive producer	
2003	View from the Top	Executive producer	
2004	Haven		
2007	Aliens vs. Predator: Requiem	Executive producer	
2008	Deception		
2009	A Perfect Getaway		
2011	A Little Bit of Heaven	Executive producer	
2011	Machine Gun Preacher		
2011	Immortals	Co-executive producer	
2012	Mirror Mirror	Executive producer	
2013	Safe Haven	Executive producer	
2013	21 & Over	Co-executive producer	
2013	Escape Plan		
2013	Dallas Buyers Club		
2013	Out of the Furnace	Executive producer	
2014	Earth to Echo	Executive producer	
2014	The Best of Me	Executive producer	
2016	The Disappointments Room	Executive producer	
2017	The Space Between Us	Executive producer	
2017	The Tribes of Palos Verdes		
2018	Burden		
2018	Escape Plan 2: Hades		Direct-to-video
2019	Escape Plan: The Extractors		Direct-to-video
2020	The Night Clerk	Executive producer	
2022	Call Jane		
2022	The In Between		
2023	Barbie		
2026	Masters of the Universe		
2026	Matchbox: The Movie		
TBA	Thomas & Friends		
TBA	Hot Wheels		
TBA	View-Master		
TBA	Wishbone		

Miscellaneous crew

Year	Film	Role
1991	The Resurrected	Additional legal services
1996	Bullet	Assistant: Mickey Rourke
1997	Nightwatch	Assistant: Michael Obel
2010	The Fighter	Executive vice president of production: Relativity Media
2011	Limitless	Executive vice president of production: Relativity Media
2011	Haywire	Executive vice president of production: Relativity Media
2012	Mirror Mirror	President of production: Relativity Media
2013	Movie 43	President of production: Relativity Media
2013	21 & Over	President of production: Relativity Media
2013	Out of the Furnace	President of production: Relativity Media

Production manager

Year	Film	Role
2014	Earth to Echo	President of production

Thanks

Year	Film	Role
2008	Traitor	The producers wish to thank
2013	Oculus	The producers and director wish to thank
2019	Fractured	Special thanks

=== Television ===
Thanks

Year	Title	Role	Notes
2017	Please Tell Me I'm Adopted!	Very special thanks	Television short
