= Zhang Jin (actor) =

Chinese actor

- 張晉
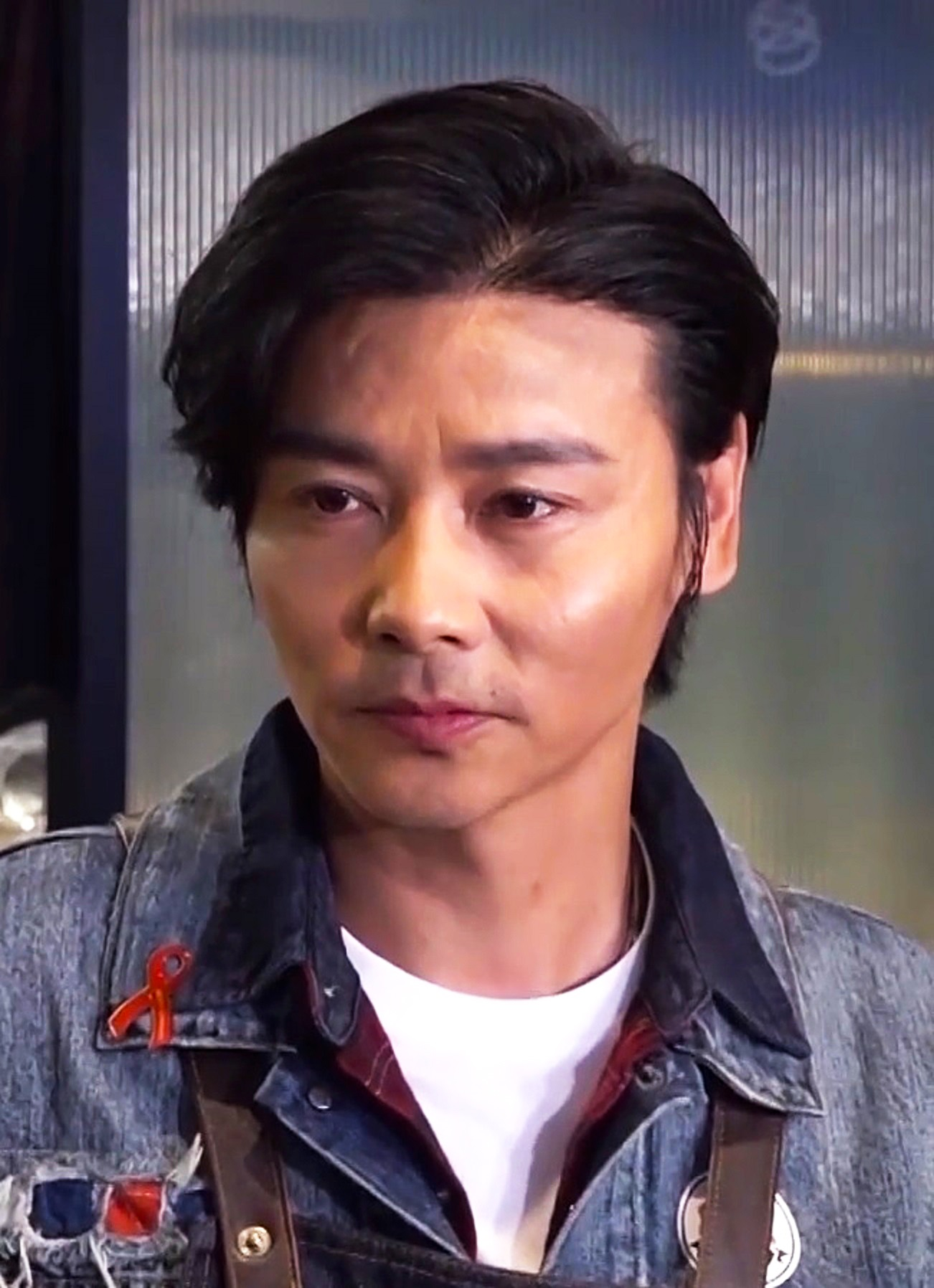
- Born: 19 May 1974 (age 52); Chongqing, China
- Other name: Max Zhang
- Occupations: Actor; martial artist
- Years active: 2000–present
- Spouse: Ada Choi (m. 2008)
- Children: 3

Chinese name
- Traditional Chinese: 張晉
- Simplified Chinese: 张晋
Transcriptions
Standard Mandarin
- Hanyu Pinyin: Zhāng Jìn
Yue: Cantonese
- Jyutping: Zoeng1 Zeon3

Zhang Jin (born 19 May 1974), also known as Max Zhang, is a Chinese actor, martial artist and former wushu athlete who won the Best Supporting Actor at the 33rd Hong Kong Film Awards.

== Career ==
Zhang began his career as a stunt actor, notably in Crouching Tiger, Hidden Dragon (2000) as the stunt double for Zhang Ziyi, with whom he later collaborated as a screen actor in My Lucky Star (2013) and The Grandmaster (2013). He also starred in Rise of the Legend in 2014, SPL II: A Time for Consequences and Ip Man 3 in 2015, The Brink in 2017, Master Z: The Ip Man Legacy in 2018 and Escape Plan: The Extractors in 2019. He also appears in a small minor role in Pacific Rim Uprising (2018). In 2021, he joined the cast of reality TV show Call Me By Fire as a contestant.

== Personal life ==
On 12 January 2008, Zhang married Hong Kong actress Ada Choi; they are both Protestant Christians. They have two daughters, Zoe and Chloe, and a son nicknamed Fishball.

== Filmography ==
=== Film Movies ===
Year	English title	Original title	Role	Notes
2000	Crouching Tiger, Hidden Dragon	臥虎藏龍		Stunt Double
2001	Chinese Heroes			
2002	Hero			
2002	Undiscovered Tomb			
2006	Shaolin vs. Evil Dead 2: Ultimate Power			
2012	The Bounty	懸賞	Yip On	
2013	The Grandmaster	一代宗師	Ma San	
2013	My Lucky Star	非常幸運		
2014	From Vegas to Macau	賭城風雲	DOA's bodyguard/assassin	
2014	Rise of the Legend	黃飛鴻之英雄有夢	Wu Long	
2015	SPL II: A Time for Consequences	殺破狼2	Ko Chun	
2015	Ip Man 3	葉問3	Cheung Tin-chi	
2017	The Brink	狂獸	Sai Gau	
2017	The Fixer			
2018	Pacific Rim: Uprising	環太平洋2：雷霆再起	Marshal Quan Chenglei	First American film appearance
2018	Asia Pacific Elimination Service	猿人突击队		
2018	Master Z: The Ip Man Legacy	葉問外傳：張天志	Cheung Tin-chi	
2019	Escape Plan: The Extractors	金蟬脫殼3：惡魔車站	Shen Lo	Second American film appearance
2019	The Invincible Dragon	九龍不敗	Kowloon	
2022	Assassins and the Missing Gold	十吨刺客		
2022	Wolf Pack	狼群	Bei Wei	
2022	Twinkle Twinkle Little Star	一閃一閃亮晶晶		
2023	SPL III: War Needs Lord	殺破狼3		
TBA	Untitled Master Z: Ip Man Legacy sequel			
TBA	Highlander			Filming

=== TV Series ===
Year	Title	Original title	Role	Notes
2001	Treasure Raiders	蕭十一郎	Xue Ying	
2001	King Among King			
2003	Legend of Spirit Mirror			
2004	Water Moon Cave Sky			
2004	Shanghai Bund: Legend of Hero and Doctor			
2004	Tracing			
2007	Proud Sword of Martial World			
2007	The Tearful Sword	泪痕剑	Yang Jian	
2007	Ming Dynasty	天下之喋血紫禁城	Wu'er Jin	Support Role
2007	Wenzhou People in Paris			
2009	Red Seventh Army			
2013	Southern Shaolin			

=== TV shows ===
Year	Title	Role	Notes
2014	A Date with Luyu (鲁豫有约)	Guest	
2015	Fight for Her (为她而战)	Guest	

== Awards and nominations ==
Year	Award	Category	Nominated work	Result
2014	Chinese Film Media Awards	Best Supporting Actor	The Grandmaster	Nominated
2014	Chinese Film Media Awards	Favorite Performance	The Grandmaster	Nominated
2014	Hundred Flowers Awards	Best Supporting Actor	The Grandmaster	Nominated
2014	33rd Hong Kong Film Awards	Best Supporting Actor	The Grandmaster	Won
2015	Sina Web Festival	Best New Power Actor		Won
2016	Chinese Film Media Awards	Best Supporting Actor	SPL II: A Time for Consequences	Nominated
2016	20th Hua Ding Awards	Best Supporting Actor	SPL II: A Time for Consequences	Won
2016	Asian Film Awards	Best Supporting Actor: Movie	Ip Man 3	Nominated
2016	35th Hong Kong Film Awards	Best Supporting Actor	SPL II: A Time for Consequences	Nominated
2016	35th Hong Kong Film Awards	Best Supporting Actor	Ip Man 3	Nominated
