= Beijing Girl =

- Chinese: 北京小妞
- Hanyu Pinyin: Běijīng Xiǎoniū
- Directed by: Qin Zhiyu
- Written by: Chen Aimin
- Starring: Ma Yashu; Sun Jiaxing; Hou Yaohua; Gao Fang
- Cinematography: Tian Jianmin
- Music by: Li Dingyi
- Production company: Children's Film Studio
- Release date: 1991
- Country: China
- Language: Mandarin

Beijing Girl is a 1991 Chinese fantasy film, created by Qin Zhiyu. This film stars Sun Jiaxing, Hou Yaohua. The story is about a Beijing girl named Jin Jing who is threatened by the hoods and loses all the donation. After that, Jin Jing decides to study stunt from a mysterious old man.

== Plot ==
It is in the autumn of Beijing when some girls build up the "Colorful Dress Art Ensemble". A quite and pretty girl named Jin Jing admires them, secretly helps them and finally becomes the accountant of the ensemble. One day, when Jin Jing is on the road to the home, she is robbed by two hoods, Wang Dong and Xiang Xi. And under the threat of Wang Dong, Jin Jing is too fear to expose their rascality. After that, Jin Jing regrets about her cowardice and decides to be braver. At the same time, an old man appears and he repels the two hoods when they try to do another devilry. Jin Jing is touched by the old man and decides to study the fantastic Kungfu from the old man. After she masters the stunt, she begins to fight with more vicious powers.
