= Sivan Alyra Rose =

American actress

- Occupation: Actress
- Years active: 2019–present

Sivan Alyra Rose is an American actress. She is best known for playing the lead role of Sasha Yazzie in the Netflix horror series Chambers.

== Early life ==
Rose grew up on the San Carlos Apache Indian Reservation just outside of Phoenix, Arizona. She was raised by her mother and grandmother. She was spotted at the age of 16 modeling at the Santa Fe Indian Market by casting director Rene Haynes. She graduated from the Institute of American Indian Arts in Santa Fe, New Mexico.

== Career ==
Rose's first role was playing Jemma in a short film called Running Shadow which was about Native Americans made by a student thesis. She then auditioned for a role on the Netflix series Chambers which she didn't get. Two days later, she got a call back for another audition. This time she was successful and landed the lead role of Sasha. In doing so she became the first Native American woman to play a lead role in a Netflix series. She praised her co-stars Uma Thurman and Tony Goldwyn for treating her as an equal despite her inexperience. She played Joy, one of the lead roles on the podcast series Bloodthirsty Hearts based off the novel series of the same name. Her most recent role has been voicing Crystal Clearwater in the cartoon show Mickey Mouse Funhouse.

== Personal life ==
Growing up her favorite show was The Powerpuff Girls while her first crush was Prince Zuko from the animated series Avatar: The Last Airbender. She frequently mentions Rihanna as her idol.

== Filmography ==
=== Film ===
Year	Title	Role	Notes
2019	Running Shadow	Jemma	Short

=== Television ===
Year	Title	Role	Notes
2019	Chambers	Sasha Yazzie	10 episodes
2022	Bloodthirsty Hearts	Joy	8 episodes
2022–2024	Mickey Mouse Funhouse	Crystal Clearwater	3 episodes
