= Mirror Mirror (film) =

2012 film by Tarsem Singh

- Theatrical release poster
- Directed by: Tarsem Singh
- Screenplay by: Marc Klein; Jason Keller
- Story by: Melisa Wallack
- Based on: "Snow White" by the Brothers Grimm
- Produced by: Ryan Kavanaugh; Bernie Goldmann; Brett Ratner; Kevin Misher
- Starring: Julia Roberts; Lily Collins; Armie Hammer; Nathan Lane; Mare Winningham; Michael Lerner; Sean Bean
- Cinematography: Brendan Galvin
- Edited by: Robert Duffy; Nick Moore
- Music by: Alan Menken
- Production companies: Yucaipa Films; Goldmann Pictures; Rat Entertainment; Misha Films; Mel's Cité du Cinéma; Misher Films
- Distributed by: Relativity Media
- Release date: March 30, 2012
- Running time: 106 minutes
- Country: United States
- Language: English
- Budget: $85–100 million
- Box office: $183 million

Mirror Mirror is a 2012 American fantasy comedy film based on the fairy tale "Snow White", collected by the Brothers Grimm, directed by Tarsem Singh, produced by Ryan Kavanaugh, Bernie Goldmann, Brett Ratner and Kevin Misher, written by Marc Klein and Jason Keller with music by Alan Menken, and starring Julia Roberts as Evil Queen and Lily Collins as Snow White along with Armie Hammer, Nathan Lane, Mare Winningham, Michael Lerner, and Sean Bean.

The film follows the beautiful princess Snow White, who uses the help of Seven Dwarfs as well as a prince, to reclaim her throne from her wicked stepmother Queen Clementianna.

It was released theatrically by Relativity Media on March 30, 2012.

The film received an Academy Award nomination for Best Costume Design and earned $183 million on an $85–100 million budget but received generally mixed reviews from critics. Mirror Mirror was released on DVD and Blu-ray by 20th Century Fox Home Entertainment on June 26, 2012.

== Plot ==
The very beautiful but wicked enchantress, the Evil Queen, narrates insisting that this is her story: she had married the widower king, who one day left to fight a great evil that had invaded the land, but never returned. The Queen rules in his absence, while confining her young stepdaughter, Princess Snow White, to the palace.

Ten years later, Snow White is now a young woman who desires to explore the kingdom, deciding to sneak out. Walking through the forest, she meets the visiting Prince Alcott of Valencia and his valet Runbock, who have been robbed by a band of dwarfs; she and Alcott are instantly smitten with each other. Snow White arrives in the town and finds the people are destitute due to the Queen's heavy taxation.

Meanwhile, the Queen is introduced to Alcott and is also smitten. She decides to marry him for his wealth to solve the kingdom's financial troubles and throws a ball to woo him. Unbeknownst to her, Snow White secretly attends, planning to ask Alcott to help her regain her throne and restore the kingdom. The Queen spots them dancing and orders her manservant Brighton to take Snow White into the forest and feed her to a monster known as "the Beast".

Showing deep care and concern for Snow White, Brighton spares her and requests that she run away from the Beast. The latter collapses at the dwarfs' hideout, who take her in and introduce themselves as Will Grimm, Butcher, Wolf, Napoleon, Half Pint, Grub, and Chuck. When Brighton collects more taxes levied by the Queen to pay for her expensive parties, the dwarfs rob him. Snow White takes the money and returns it to the townspeople, crediting the dwarfs, whom the people hail as heroes.

The Queen informs Alcott that Snow White is dead. When he hears the bandits have robbed Brighton, he goes after them. In the forest, he discovers that Snow White is in league with the dwarfs, who have trained her in combat. Both believing each other to be in the wrong, Snow White and Alcott duel. He returns, defeated, and informs the Queen that Snow White was the dwarfs' leader and is alive.

The Queen enters her Mirror House to consult her reflection, the Mirror Queen. She has her temporarily turn Brighton into a cockroach as punishment for his betrayal and deception and requests a love potion to make Alcott fall in love with her, the same one she once used on Snow White's father.

The Queen accidentally gives him a "puppy love" potion, however, so Alcott becomes devoted to her like a puppy. Due to this, he agrees to marry her. Using dark magic, the Mirror Queen attacks Snow White and the dwarfs with two giant marionettes, but she defeats them by cutting their strings.

On the day of her wedding, the Queen arrives to find that Snow White and the dwarfs have raided the party and abducted Alcott. For her inability to handle bandits and for lying about Snow White's death, the aristocrats demand for her to be deposed. Back in the hideout, Snow White breaks the spell on Alcott with true love's kiss.

Snow White encounters the Queen, who sends the Beast after her. It manages to catch her, but hesitates in killing her. Snow White sees the Beast wearing a necklace with a moon charm on it similar to the Queen's, and cuts it off, breaking the curse and restoring the Beast to its true form: her father. The Queen then ages rapidly, and the Mirror Queen asks if she is ready to know the price for using dark magic.

Grateful to Alcott for his assistance, the King agrees to let him marry his daughter and never sees his ex-wife, the evil queen, again. At their wedding, an old hag in a hooded robe appears, offering Snow White an apple as a wedding gift. Snow White accepts it and is about to bite it before realizing that the hag is the Queen.

Snow White cuts a piece from the apple with her father's dagger and hands it to her. The Queen accepts defeat, takes the apple and vanishes. The Mirror Queen affirms it was Snow White's story after all before the Mirror House shatters. Snow White, Prince Alcott, the King, and the dwarfs live happily ever after.

== Cast ==
- Julia Roberts as the Evil Queen Clementianna, Snow White's insecure stepmother.
- Lily Collins as Snow White, the Queen's stepdaughter.
- Armie Hammer as Alcott, the Prince of Valencia and Snow White's love interest.
- Nathan Lane as Brighton, the Queen's executive bootlicker.
- Mare Winningham as Margaret, the royal baker who was Snow White's friend since childhood.
- Michael Lerner as the Baron, an elite member of the kingdom who is often recommended for the Queen to get engaged to.
- Sean Bean as the King, the father of Snow White, who went missing.

Other cast members include:

- Robert Emms as Charles Renbock, Prince Alcott's faithful valet and confidant.
- Danny Woodburn as Will Grimm, the leader of the Seven Dwarfs named after the Brothers Grimm.
- Martin Klebba as Butcher, a dwarf who used to work as a butcher.
- Mark Povinelli as Half Pint, a dwarf who has a crush on Snow White.
- Jordan Prentice as Napoleon, a dwarf who wears a hat similar to Napoleon's.
- Sebastian Saraceno as Wolf, a dwarf in a wolf-skin cape.
- Joey Gnoffo as Grub, a dwarf who is always eating.
- Ronald Lee Clark as Chuckles, a dwarf who chuckles a lot.
- Lisa Roberts Gillan as Mirror Queen, the reflection of the Queen who is much wiser, kinder, and somewhat younger than her.
- Alex Ivanovici as the town's magistrate that collects the taxes for Brighton.
- Frank Welker as the voice of:
  - The Beast, a chimeric creature with a lion-like head, the antlers of a deer, chicken leg-like arms, the wings of an eagle, and the body and tail of a snake with a tail-claw at the end of the tail.
  - The Marionettes, two giant-sized marionettes controlled by the Mirror Queen to attack the dwarfs

== Production ==
=== Development ===
Roberts was the first to be cast, because very early on Tarsem Singh wanted an Evil Queen with whom audiences could relate. He stated that in the film, the queen is not evil, but rather insecure. He also suggested that the Queen's true ugliness may be revealed at the very end of the film. Originally Saoirse Ronan was considered for the role of Snow White but the age difference between her and Armie Hammer was too large (he was 25 and she was 17). Felicity Jones was offered the part but turned it down. Collins was eventually cast in the role. Collins said in an interview that her casting happened in 24 hours after she met Tarsem Singh and read for him. Hammer was cast as the prince who is at first drawn towards the Queen and then towards Snow White. He beat out James McAvoy and Alex Pettyfer for the role.

=== Filming ===
Filming for Mirror Mirror began on June 20, 2011, in Montreal, Quebec, under the working title Untitled Snow White Project. Production on the film wrapped in mid-September. The film was officially titled Mirror Mirror on November 4, 2011. The first trailer was released on November 30, 2011, in partnership with Relativity Media and Trailer Park. The teaser poster was released the same day. Mirror Mirror was the last film which Tarsem's regular costume designer, Eiko Ishioka, worked on before her death. The visual effects were designed by Tom Wood and executed by Wayne Brinton, Tim Carras, Sébastien Moreau and Amanda Dyar. Relativity Media announced the movie's final cost as being $85 million, though an article in the Los Angeles Times said the true budget was closer to $100 million. Julia Roberts used a British accent for her portrayal of the Evil Queen, reflecting the convention of using British accents for aristocratic, historical, or fairy-tale characters.

== Soundtrack ==
The song "I Believe in Love" was originally written in 1970 by Nina Hart, a singer-songwriter and stage and TV actress (then working at New York City music-publishing company, Golden Bough Productions.) The song was one of several written by Hart for director Miloš Forman to consider for his film Taking Off. She performed the song in Forman's film, playing a character at an audition; Hart's recording was a hit in Italy and was later covered by Iranian singer Googoosh. Tarsem Singh—who was unaware that it had previously been used in a film—chose the song for the Bollywood-style musical finale of Mirror Mirror because his daughter had enjoyed the song when he had played it for her the previous year.

- I Believe In Love (Mirror Mirror Mix) – Performed by Lily Collins
- All Music – Written and composed by Alan Menken

== Release ==
The film was released in theaters on March 30, 2012. Home media distribution was handled by 20th Century Fox Home Entertainment, now a subsidiary of The Walt Disney Company.

== Reception ==
The film received generally mixed reviews. Review aggregator Rotten Tomatoes gives the film a rating of 50% with an average score of 5.60/10 based on reviews from 195 critics. The site's general consensus is that "Like most of Tarsem Singh's films, Mirror Mirror is undeniably beautiful – but its treatment of the age-old Snow White fable lacks enough depth or originality to set it apart from the countless other adaptations of the tale." On Metacritic, which assigns a weighted mean rating out of 100 reviews from film critics, it has an average score of 46 from the 34 reviews, which indicates "Mixed or average reviews".

Roger Ebert gave it 2.5 out of 4 stars and said: "It is a sumptuous fantasy for the eyes and a pinball game for the mind, as story elements collide and roll around bumping into each other. This is not a faithful retelling of the versions by the Brothers Grimm or Walt Disney, but neither is it a satire, nor much of a story in its own right. But it's great to look at. If there's a major difference from the earlier versions, it's how this one has beefed-up roles for the seven dwarves, who here seem to be a merry band in search of Robin Hood. Nor do I recall earlier battles with a giant winged griffin." Ebert concluded his review by saying: "All of this is in place and looks great, but the dialogue is rather flat, the movie sort of boring, and there's not much energy in the two places it should really be felt: Between the Queen and Snow White, and between Snow and the Prince. The story is a listless tale that moves at a stately pace through settings that could have supported fireworks. Indeed, the characters who seem to care the most about each other are the dwarfs".

Robbie Collin from British newspaper The Telegraph gave the film four stars describing it as "an exuberantly charming fairy story that owes as much to the gnarled folk tale illustrations of Arthur Rackham as the stagey, saturated lunacy of that half-loved, half-feared East German fantasy The Singing Ringing Tree. It's a Grimm piece of work, but far from a grim one: without rehashing the seminal Disney animated version, it radiates gorgeousness and good humour with a near-nuclear intensity." Collin praised costume designer Eiko Ishioka's work, saying "every outfit in Mirror Mirror is a masterpiece". He concluded the film is "the opposite of Tim Burton's brash, chaotic, dispiritingly popular Alice in Wonderland: here, the artistry of the cast and crew leaps off the screen, not 3D computer graphics."

=== Box office ===
On its opening day, Mirror Mirror made $5.8 million, coming in at the No. 3 spot behind The Hunger Games and Wrath of the Titans. For its opening weekend, the film earned $18.1 million while holding onto the No. 3 spot at the box office. During its theatrical run, Mirror Mirror grossed $64.9 million in North America and $118.1 million internationally, bringing its worldwide total to $183 million.

=== Home media ===
Mirror Mirror was released on DVD and Blu-ray by 20th Century Fox Home Entertainment on June 26, 2012.

=== Awards and nominations ===
Award	Category	Recipients	Result	Ref.
Academy Awards	Best Costume Design	Eiko Ishioka	Nominated	
BMI Film & TV Awards	Film Music	Alan Menken	Won	
Costume Designers Guild Awards	Excellence in Fantasy Film	Eiko Ishioka	Won	
Kids' Choice Awards	Favorite Villain	Julia Roberts	Nominated	
Teen Choice Awards	Choice Movie: Sci-Fi/Fantasy	Mirror Mirror	Nominated	
Teen Choice Awards	Choice Movie Actress: Sci-Fi/Fantasy	Lily Collins	Nominated	

== See also ==
- List of films about witchcraft
- Grimm's Snow White, another 2012 film based on the tale of Snow White.
- Snow White and the Huntsman, another 2012 film based on the tale of Snow White that was released after this film.
- Blancanieves, a Spanish film also released on 2012 based on the tale of Snow White.
- Snow White: A Deadly Summer, an horror film also released on 2012 inspired by the tale of Snow White.
- Snow White (2025 film), another Snow White adaption that Martin Klebba was involved in.
