= Ma Yashu =

Chinese actress

- 马雅舒
- Born: March 24, 1977 (age 49); Kunming, Yunnan, China
- Education: National Academy of Chinese Theatre Arts
- Occupation: Actress
- Years active: 1995–present
- Spouse: Nicky Wu (m. 2006; div. 2009) James Robert Hayes (m. 2010)
- Children: 2
- Relatives: Atina Robert (stepdaughter)

Chinese name
- Traditional Chinese: 馬雅舒
- Simplified Chinese: 马雅舒
Transcriptions
Standard Mandarin
- Hanyu Pinyin: Mǎ Yǎshū

Alternative Chinese name
- Traditional Chinese: 馬婭舒
- Simplified Chinese: 马娅舒
Transcriptions
Standard Mandarin
- Hanyu Pinyin: Mǎ Yǎshū

Ma Yashu (Chinese: 马雅舒; born 24 March 1977) is a Chinese actress best known for her roles as Bai Lianhua and He Xiaoxi in the television series Journey to the West (2000) and The Story of Parents House (2008) respectively.

== Early life and education ==
Ma was born in Kunming, Yunnan on March 24, 1977. In 1986 she was accepted to the National Academy of Chinese Theatre Arts.

== Acting career ==
Ma made her film debut in Beijing Girl (1989), playing Jin Jing.

In 1995, Ma made her television debut in Legendary Life.

In 1996, she had a minor role as Bi Zhu in The Greatness of a Hero, which starred Sun Chengzheng as Di Renjie. That same year, she had a cameo appearance in the historical television series Heroes in Sui and Tang Dynasties, a television series adaptation based on the novel of the same name.

Ma starred in a television series called Journey to the West with Cao Rong, Huang Haibing, and Wu Jian. It is a sequel to Journey to the West.

In 2002 she co-starred with Nicky Wu and Athena Chu in the wuxia television series Treasure Raiders, adapted from Taiwanese novelist Gu Long's novel of the same title.

Ma had a supporting role in Fate in Tears and Laughter (2004), based on the novel by the same name by Zhang Henshui. She played a supporting role in Heroes on a Silk Road, starring Nicky Wu and Theresa Lee and directed by Chin Siu-ho.

In 2005, she appeared in The Legend of Hero, a Taiwanese television series adapted from the Hong Kong manhua series Chinese Hero: Tales of the Blood Sword by Ma Wing-shing. It was produced by Young Pei-pei and starred Peter Ho and Ady An in the leading roles. She starred with Nicky Wu, Chin Siu-ho and Alex To in Iron Fisted Drifter. She also appeared in Girls' Diary, opposite Yang Zi.

Ma was cast as Zhao Yuhua in Prince to Pauper (2007), opposite Du Chun and Hawick Lau.

In 2008, she played the female lead role in Medic, alongside Deng Chao and Li Xiaoran. She starred as Chun Tao, reuniting her with co-star Jia Nailiang, who played her lover, in the TV drama Chun Tao's War. She appeared in The Story of Parents House. She continued in the role in the 2011 television series The Story of Parents House 3, and 2016's The Story of Parents House 4.

Ma played Liu Qizhen, the lead role in He Liping's romantic television series Who Knows the Female of the Women (2010), costarring Hawick Lau. She co-starred with Chen Sicheng in Pretty Maid.

In 2012, Ma had a lead role in the TV drama, Lock Dream.

Ma took the lead role in the 2018 romantic comedy television series Nice to Meet You, alongside Zhang Ming'en, Wen Yongshan, Wei Qianxiang and Tang Mengjia.

In 2019, it was reported that Ma was in talks to appear in the television series adaption of Jin Yong's wuxia novel Demi-Gods and Semi-Devils which will be directed by Yu Rongguang.

== Personal life ==
Ma married Nicky Wu in December 2006. They first met while appearing in the Chinese television series Treasure Raiders in 2001. They divorced on August 11, 2009.

After a turbulent divorce, she remarried on June 27, 2010. Her husband is named James Robert Hayes (詹姆斯·罗伯特). The couple has a daughter, Mia (米雅), and a son, Aiden (爱登). She also has a stepdaughter, Atina Robert (阿蒂娜·罗伯特).

== Filmography ==
=== Film ===
Year	English title	Chinese title	Role	Notes
1989	Beijing Girl	北京小妞	Jin Jing	

=== Television ===
Year	English title	Chinese title	Role	Notes
1995	Legendary Life	传奇人生		
1996	Heroes in Sui and Tang Dynasties	隋唐演义	Xiao Cui	
1996	The Greatness of a Hero	狄仁杰断案传奇	Bi Zhu	
1998		喜鹊东南飞		
1998	Strange Stories from a Chinese Studio	聊斋		
1999	Black Blood	黑血	Lu Mei	
1999	Princess Wencheng	文成公主	Bhrikuti	
2000		乱世桃花	Hong Er	
2000		网事情缘	Li Yun	
2000	Journey to the West	西游记后传	Bai Lianhua	
2001		人虫	Yang Xiaoxia	
2001	Treasure Raiders	萧十一郎	Feng Siniang	
2001	Legend of Chen Zhen	陈真后传	Li Chou	
2001		天空下的缘分		
2002		女人汤	Mother Tang	
2002		少年王	Du Juan	
2003	Heroes on a Silk Road	丝路豪侠	Bai Hua	
2003	Iron Fisted Drifter	铁拳浪子	Lan Jing	
2004	The Legend of Hero	中华英雄	Ji Si	
2004	Fate in Tears and Laughter	啼笑因缘	Guan Xiugu	
2004		大清洗冤录	Yang Taohua	
2005	Girls' Diary	女生日记	Teacher Luo	
2006		爱了散了	Qiao Yu	
2007	Shun Niang	顺娘	Chen Shunying	
2007		宁为女人	Zhou Huijun	
2007	Prince to Pauper	换子成龙	Zhao Yuhua	
2008	The Story of Parents House	娘家的故事	He Xiaoxi	
2008		牌坊下的女人	Fang Jin	
2008	Medic	军医	Er Mei	
2009	Pretty Maid	大丫鬟	Sang Caiqing	
2009	Chun Tao's War	春桃的战争	Chun Tao	
2009	Who Knows the Female of the Women	谁知女人心	Liu Qizhen	
2010		裸婚	Lin Fei	
2010	Decent Women	良家妇女	Zhou Ruoyun	
2010		爱情有点蓝	Song Lixin	
2011		郎本无情	Zhang Ruoyan	
2011	The Story of Parents House 3	娘家的故事3	He Xiaoxi	
2012	The Mother's Heart	娘心	Xiao Yu	
2013	Trapped	步步杀机	Qi Qingmei	
2013	Lock Dream	锁梦楼	Jin Feng	
2013	Gun Fire	枪火	Ma Shu	
2013		幸福绽放	Qi Wen	
2016	Hero	英雄烈	Misaki Sato Keyco	
2016	The Story of Parents House 4	娘家的故事4	He Xiaoxi	
2019	Demi-Gods and Semi-Devil	天龙八部	Li Qingluo	
2019	Nice to Meet You	只为遇见你	Mu Ziyun	
2021	Demi-Gods and Semi-Devil	天龙八部	Li Qingluo	
