= Escape Plan (film) =

2013 prison film by Mikael Håfström

- Theatrical release poster
- Directed by: Mikael Håfström
- Screenplay by: Miles Chapman; Arnell Jesko
- Story by: Miles Chapman
- Produced by: Mark Canton; Randall Emmett; Remington Chase; Robbie Brenner; Kevin King-Templeton; Stepan Martirosyan; Kelly Dennis; Brandon Grimes
- Starring: Sylvester Stallone; Arnold Schwarzenegger; Jim Caviezel; Curtis "50 Cent" Jackson; Vinnie Jones; Vincent D'Onofrio; Amy Ryan
- Cinematography: Brendan Galvin
- Edited by: Elliot Greenberg
- Music by: Alex Heffes
- Production companies: Summit Entertainment; Emmett/Furla Films; Atmosphere Entertainment; Envision Entertainment; Boies/Schiller Film Group
- Distributed by: Lionsgate
- Release dates: July 18, 2013 (San Diego Comic-Con); October 18, 2013 (United States)
- Running time: 115 minutes
- Country: United States
- Language: English
- Budget: $54–70 million
- Box office: $137 million

Escape Plan is a 2013 American prison action thriller film starring Sylvester Stallone and Arnold Schwarzenegger, and co-starring Jim Caviezel, Curtis Jackson, Vinnie Jones, Vincent D'Onofrio and Amy Ryan. It was directed by Swedish filmmaker Mikael Håfström, and written by Miles Chapman and Jason Keller (under the anagram pen-name 'Arnell Jesko'). The first film to pair up Stallone and Schwarzenegger as co-leads, it follows Stallone's character Ray Breslin, a lawyer turned prison security tester who is incarcerated in the world's most secret and secure prison, and recruits fellow inmate Emil Rottmayer, portrayed by Schwarzenegger, to stage a breakout. The film is the first installment of the Escape Plan film series.

The film was released in the United States on October 18, 2013, received mixed reviews and grossed $137 million worldwide against a $54–70 million budget.

== Plot ==
Former prosecutor Ray Breslin is the founder and co-owner of Breslin-Clark, a security firm specializing in testing the security measures of supermax prisons. Posing as an inmate to study facilities from within and exploit their weaknesses to escape, Breslin is driven by the murders of his wife and child by an escaped convict he had successfully prosecuted, and has garnered a reputation as the man who can escape any prison.

Breslin and his business partner, Lester Clark, receive a multimillion-dollar deal from CIA operative Jessica Miller to test a new, top secret prison for disappeared persons on the condition that Ray and his team cannot know the prison's true location. Although this violates his principles, Breslin agrees. In New Orleans, Breslin allows himself to be captured, pretending to be a mercenary and posing under the alias Anthony Portos. Unexpectedly, the plan goes awry when his captors remove a tracking microchip implanted in his arm by Miller and drug him, preventing his colleagues from knowing where he has been taken. During the flight, he witnesses a mercenary named Drake kill another captive.

Breslin wakes up inside the prison and realizes that the warden, Willard Hobbes, is not the same warden who was supposed to release him in an emergency, rendering the secret evacuation code that Jessica gave him useless. He discovers that the prison cells have fully transparent walls and tend to rotate around various blocks, and that the guards surveilling the cells are clad in fully black masks and robes. He befriends another inmate, Emil Rottmayer, who claims to be a security expert for Victor Mannheim, a faceless Robin Hood-type figure who steals from the wealthy.

Staging an escape attempt, Breslin discovers he is aboard a massive prison ship under the guise of an oil tanker somewhere in the middle of an ocean. Having been informed by Clark of Breslin’s job as a prison security tester, Hobbes reveals to Breslin that he is aware of his true identity and will ensure Breslin spends the rest of his life in the prison (as requested by Clark, who intended to take over the joint business by getting rid of Breslin). Hobbes also notes that Breslin's book was the ideal blueprint for constructing the prison. Breslin offers Hobbes information on Mannheim in exchange for his release, to which Hobbes agrees. While Breslin feeds Hobbes false information about Mannheim, his colleagues, Abigail Ross and Hush, grow suspicious of Clark when Breslin's paycheck for the job is frozen. Hush discovers that the prison, codenamed "The Tomb," is owned by a for-profit organization linked to a notorious private security contractor. Clark is also revealed to be in direct contact with Hobbes about Breslin's imprisonment.

With help of an DIY-sextant and another inmate named Javed who sneaks outside to secretly measure the ship’s latitude, Breslin and Rottmayer deduce they are somewhere in the Atlantic Ocean near Morocco. Breslin convinces the Tomb physician, Dr. Kyrie, to send a request for support from Mannheim’s associates and relay them the ship’s coordinates. Shortly after, Breslin, Rottmayer and Javed stage a rebellion in their sector, overpower the guards and sneak out of the prison into the interior facilities of the ship. In the second escape attempt, Breslin kills Drake when he tries to intercept them, but the already wounded Javed, who was buying time for Rottmayer and Breslin to escape, is gunned down by Hobbes and his men. A helicopter sent by Mannheim’s associates arrives at the ship and engages in a gunfight with the guards. Rottmayer kills the guards on the deck and boards the helicopter, waiting for Breslin. Meanwhile, Breslin, who remained inside the ship to cut off the power supply, hides in the ship’s septic tank and is flushed to the bottom of the ship when Hobbes’s men unintentionally depressurize the tank. Reaching the helicopter as Hobbes fires at him, Breslin climbs the hanging ladder and shoots several leaking oil barrels, killing Hobbes in the explosion.

The helicopter lands on a Moroccan beach, where Rottmayer reveals he is actually Mannheim himself and "Jessica Miller" is in fact his daughter, who hired Breslin to mastermind her father's escape. As punishment for his betrayal, Lester Clark is captured by Hush, locked in a shipping container and sent off to an unknown location.

== Cast ==
- Sylvester Stallone as Ray Breslin / Anthony Portos, a former prosecutor, businessman and skilled structural engineer who is best known for being the world's best escape artist.
- Arnold Schwarzenegger as Emil Rottmayer / Victor Mannheim, an inmate who befriends Ray.
- Jim Caviezel as Warden Willard Hobbes, the malicious owner of the Tomb prison facility.
- Curtis "50 Cent" Jackson as "Hush", Ray's best friend who is working as his own technical expert.
- Sam Neill as Dr. Kyrie, the doctor of the Tomb prison facility.
- Vinnie Jones as Drake, Hobbes' sadistic and violent personal assistant and bodyguard as well as the leader of the Tomb prison facility's security array.
- Faran Tahir as Javed Afridi, a Muslim inmate of the Tomb who allies with Breslin and Mannheim.
- Vincent D'Onofrio as Lester Clark, Ray's business partner who arranges the various escape jobs.
- Amy Ryan as Abigail Ross, a senior member of Breslin-Clark and another friend of Ray.
- Graham Beckel as Brims
- Matt Gerald as Roag
- Caitriona Balfe as Jessica Miller, a CIA operative who hires Breslin.
- Lydia Hull as Jules, a receptionist

== Production ==
The spec script was initially called The Tomb. When Summit first purchased the script, Jeff Wadlow was attached to direct and Jason Keller was hired to do rewrites.

Early reports in 2010 speculated that Bruce Willis was cast as Ray Breslin and Antoine Fuqua was attached to direct. It was revealed by producer Mark Canton on The Matthew Aaron Show that Jim Caviezel had signed on to the film, playing the prison warden Hobbes.

British actor Vinnie Jones signed on to co-star as Drake, the ruthless prison guard.

Variety and other media in the news stated that Amy Ryan, Vincent D'Onofrio, and 50 Cent had joined the cast of Escape Plan. It was confirmed in mid-April that 50 Cent would play the computer expert who was once incarcerated for cyber crimes helping Breslin's character escape, D'Onofrio would play the deputy director of the high-tech prison, and Ryan would play Stallone's business partner and his potential love interest.

In an interview with the British newspaper The Sun, Vinnie Jones stated that the film was to shoot April 16 to June 23 in New Orleans. Shooting for Escape Plan was also confirmed to take place in Louisiana in the spring of 2012. In August 2012, at The Expendables 2 conference, Arnold Schwarzenegger commented on the film and stated that filming had finished. The engine room fight scene between Breslin and Drake was filmed onboard the bulk carrier RICAN, the giveaway is IMO NO 7621932 seen in several scenes.

== Release ==
On April 9, 2013, it was officially announced that the film had been pushed back to a September 13, 2013 release and the film's title had been changed from The Tomb to Escape Plan. On July 18, 2013, a fan screening was held at the Reading Cinemas Gaslamp 15 at San Diego Comic-Con, which Stallone and Schwarzenegger attended. The film was theatrically released in the United States on October 18, 2013.

== Reception ==
=== Box office ===
The film underperformed at the U.S. box office, debuting at number four on the box office chart with $9.89 million from 2,883 theaters and ultimately grossing only $25.1 million domestically. However, Escape Plan was an international box-office success, debuting at first place in several Asian and European markets, with the total international gross more than doubling its $50 million budget at $112 million, totaling up to a worldwide gross of $137 million.

=== Critical response ===
Escape Plan was met with mixed reviews from critics. Rotten Tomatoes gives the film a rating of 50%, based on reviews from 107 critics, with an average score of 5.4/10. The site's critical consensus states: "As much fun as it is to see Sylvester Stallone and Arnold Schwarzenegger team up onscreen, Escape Plan fails to offer much more than a pale imitation of 1980s popcorn thrills." Metacritic gives the film a score of 49 out of 100, based on 33 reviews, indicating "mixed or average" reviews. Audiences surveyed by CinemaScore gave the film a grade "B+".

Tom Huddleston of Time Out London gave the film two out of five stars, commenting that the film "would have made a perfect vehicle for, say, a Chuck Norris or even a Jean-Claude Van Damme. But these two redoubtable, enormously watchable old-school heroes deserve better." Ben Rawson-Jones of Digital Spy gave the film four out of five stars, commenting that it "defies those who wrote off the abilities of its stars to cut the muscular mustard in today's youth-orientated cultural climate. These supposedly old dogs have plenty of life—but their effectiveness relies on the foundation of a smart script that plays to their strengths and the audience's perception of their star personas." Neil Genzlinger of The New York Times said in his review: "Mikael Håfstrom, the director, pushes the suspense buttons efficiently, and the plot twists are disguised well enough for the not-very-demanding crowd this film will draw. The scenes with Mr. Stallone and Mr. Schwarzenegger are a little disappointing — it's their first pairing as top-billed co-stars, yet the script never gives them the kind of memorable exchange that makes fans howl with delight. But all in all, Escape Plan does what it sets out to do."

== Sequels ==
In February 2017, it was announced that a sequel was then in development with Stallone confirmed to reprise his role as Ray Breslin. In the same report it was revealed that Steven C. Miller would direct the film, with Miles Chapman returning as screenwriter. Dave Bautista, 50 Cent, and Jaime King were cast in the film. In March 2017, the official title was announced as Escape Plan 2: Hades. The film was released direct-to-video on June 29, 2018.

In April 2017, a third film entered the early stages of development with Stallone again signed on to reprise his role as Ray Breslin. The film, Escape Plan: The Extractors, was released direct-to-video on July 2, 2019.

== See also ==
- List of American films of 2013
- Arnold Schwarzenegger filmography
- Sylvester Stallone filmography
- Lock Up, another Sylvester Stallone movie set in a prison
