= Lies =

Lies may refer to:

- Lie, an untruthful statement
- Lies (evidence), falsehoods in common law

== Geography ==
- Lies, Hautes-Pyrénées, a commune in Occitanie region, France
- Lies, Friesland, a village on the island of Terschelling, Friesland, the Netherlands
- Lies, North Brabant, a hamlet in Breda, North Brabant, the Netherlands

== Books ==
- Lies (Gone series), the third book of Michael Grant's series
- Lies, Inc., an expanded version of the 1964 book The Unteleported Man by Philip K. Dick

== Film and television ==
- Lies (1983 film), an American thriller by Ken and Jim Wheat
- Lies (1999 film), a South Korean film directed by Jang Sun-wu
- Lies (2008 film), a Swedish short film directed by Jonas Odell
- "Lies" (The Black Donnellys), a 2007 television episode
- "Lies" (Roseanne), a 1992 television episode

== Music ==
- L.I.E.S., an American electronic music record label

=== Albums ===
- Lies (Guns N' Roses album) or G N' R Lies, 1988
- Lies, by Blodwyn Pig, 1993
- Lies, by Bon Voyage, 2008
- Lies, by Heartbreak, 2008

=== Songs ===
- "Lies" (1931 song), written by Harry Barris and George E. Springer
- "Lies" (Anette Olzon song), 2014
- "Lies" (Big Bang song), 2007
- "Lies" (Burns song), 2012
- "Lies" (En Vogue song), 1990
- "Lies" (g.o.d song), 2000
- "Lies" (Jonathan Butler song), 1987
- "Lies" (The Knickerbockers song), 1965
- "Lies" (Koda Kumi song), 2006
- "Lies" (McFly song), 2008
- "Lies" (Rolling Stones song), 1978
- "Lies" (Status Quo song), 1980
- "Lies" (T-ara song), 2009
- "Lies" (Thompson Twins song), 1982
- "Lies" (Zach Bryan song), 2026
- "Lies", by Alphaville from Forever Young, 1984
- "Lies", by Billy Talent from Billy Talent, 2003
- "Lies", by the Black Keys from Attack & Release, 2008
- "Lies", by Chvrches from The Bones of What You Believe, 2013
- "Lies", by the Click Five from Greetings from Imrie House, 2005
- "Lies", by Dillon Francis from This Mixtape Is Fire, 2015
- "Lies", by Elton John from Made in England, 1995
- "Lies", by EMF from Schubert Dip, 1991
- "Lies", by Evanescence from Origin, 2000
- "Lies", by Fenech-Soler, 2009
- "Lies", by Hercules and Love Affair from Omnion, 2017
- "Lies", by Hilary Duff from Breathe In. Breathe Out., 2015
- "Lies", by J. J. Cale from Really, 1973
- "Lies", by James Maslow, 2015
- "Lies", by Korn from Korn, 1994
- "Lies", by Marina and the Diamonds from Electra Heart, 2012
- "Lies", by MC Magic from Magic City, 2006
- "Lies", by Pale Waves from Unwanted, 2022
- "Lies", by Pet Shop Boys, a B-side of the single "You Only Tell Me You Love Me When You're Drunk", 2000
- "Lies", by Roxette from Crash! Boom! Bang!, 1994
- "Lies", by the Saturdays from Chasing Lights, 2008
- "Lies", by Schoolboy Q from Crash Talk, 2019
- "Lies", by Stabbing Westward from Ungod, 1994
- "Lies", by Stan Rogers from Northwest Passage, 1981
- "Lies", by Starbreaker from Starbreaker, 2005
- "Lies", by the Waifs from Sink or Swim, 2000
- "Lies", by Wild Orchid, B-side of the single "Stuttering (Don't Say)", 2001
- "Lies (Through the 80s)", by Manfred Mann's Earth Band from Chance, 1980

== People ==
=== Surname ===
- Brian Lies (born 1963), American author and illustrator
- Eugene Lies, American politician
- Joseph Lies (1821–1865), Belgian painter
- Olaf Lies (born 1967), German politician

=== Given name ===
- Lies Bonnier (1925–2021), Dutch swimmer
- Lies Cosijn (1931–2016), Dutch ceramicist
- Lies Eykens (born 1989), Belgian volleyball player
- Lies Jans (born 1974), Belgian politician
- Lies Noor (1943–1961), Indonesian actress
- Lies Rustenburg (born 1990), Dutch rower
- Lies Tizioualou (born 1965), Algerian volleyball player
- Lies Visschedijk (born 1974), Dutch actress

== See also ==
- Lie (disambiguation)
- Liar (disambiguation)
- Lyse (disambiguation)
- White Lies (disambiguation)
