= Lyse =

Lyse may refer to:

== People ==
- Lyse Doucet (born 1958), Canadian journalist, presenter and correspondent for BBC World Service radio and BBC World television
- Lyse Richer (born 1958), Canadian administrator and music teacher
- Carl L. Lyse (1899–1986), American businessman and politician

== Places ==
- Lyse Abbey, a former Cistercian abbey in Norway
- Lyse, an alternative name of Lysebotn, Norway
- Łyse, Masovian Voivodeship, a village in east-central Poland
- Łyse, Podlaskie Voivodeship, a village in north-east Poland

== Other ==
- Lyse AS, a Norwegian power and telecommunications company
- Lyse (mythology), daughter of Thespius and Megamede in Greek mythology, who bore Heracles a son, Eumedes
- Lysine exporter (LysE), a superfamily of particular transport proteins
- Lyse, a verb referring to the process of lysis, the death of a cell by bursting
