= Rhema Marvanne =

American singer (born 2002)

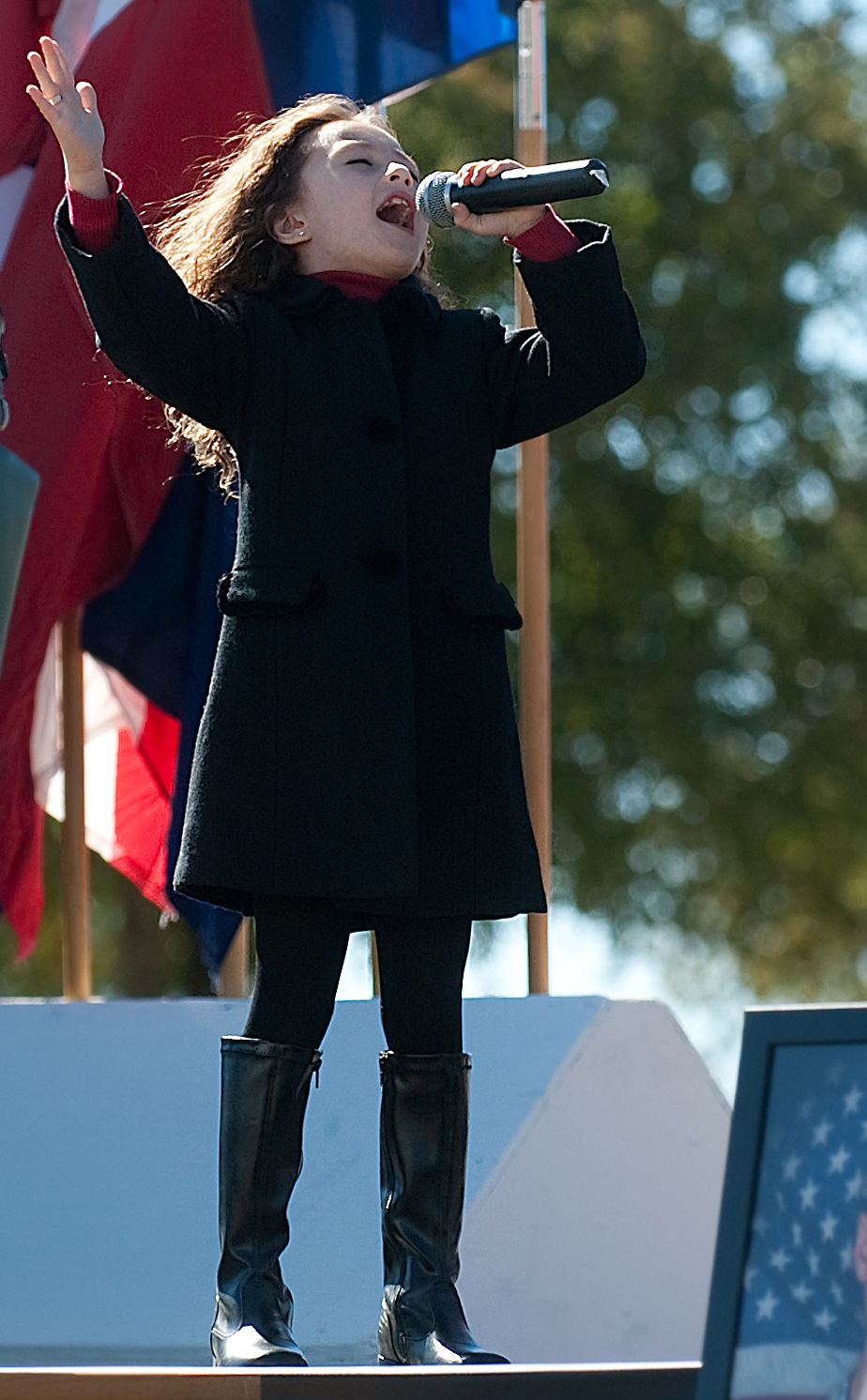
- Rhema Marvanne sings The Prayer during a remembrance ceremony at Fort Hood, Texas on November 5, 2010.
- Born: Rhema Marvanne Voraritskul; September 15, 2002 (age 24); Dallas, Texas, U.S.
- Occupation: Singer
- Years active: 2009–2012, 2020–present
- Parent(s): Wendi Marvanne; Teton Voraritskul
- Musical career
- Genres: Gospel; Contemporary Christian
- Instrument: Vocals
- Label: RhemaMarvanneInc.
- Website: facebook.com/RhemaFan

Rhema Marvanne Voraritskul (born September 15, 2002) is an American gospel singer from Carrollton, Texas.

== Early life ==
Rhema Marvanne Voraritskul was born September 15, 2002. Her mother was Wendi Marvanne and her father is Atethan Voraritskul (also known as Teton). She was born at Trinity Hospital in Carrollton, Texas. She was very small at birth—the same birth weight as her father—4 lb 11 oz (2.1 kg) and had to stay in the neonatal intensive care unit for three weeks before she was taken home. Rhema was baptized in 2009.

== Career ==
Rhema began singing the same time she began talking. In 2009, Rhema gained Internet fame at the age of six after recording her first song, "Amazing Grace". Her recording of "Amazing Grace" gained her YouTube fame when posted June 13, 2010, along with the publicity on the Maury Povich Show. She appeared on the Maury Povich Show Most Talented Kids 2010, and Korean show Star King. She takes inspiration from her mother, Wendi Marvanne, who was a singer-songwriter, and died of ovarian cancer on November 8, 2008, at the age of 36, after having been diagnosed when Rhema was 6 years old.

Rhema appeared in Gerard Butler's 2011 drama film Machine Gun Preacher released in Fall 2011 (a Lionsgate Film).

== Albums ==
Her albums to date have been produced by her father. Her third studio album "Believe" was produced by David Howarth.

- Rhema Marvanne, released October 15, 2010
- All Seasons
- Believe, released in June 2011
