= Little White Lies =

Little White Lie(s) may refer to:

== Film and television ==
- Little White Lie (2008 film), an Irish television drama film
- Little White Lie, a 2015 television documentary film by filmmaker Lacey Schwartz Delgado
- A Little White Lie, a 2022 American comedy film
- Little White Lies, a 1989 American television film starring Tim Matheson and Ann Jillian
- Little White Lies (1996 film), an Australian film starring Andrew McFarlane
- "Little White Lies" (Degrassi High), an episode of Degrassi High
- Little White Lies, a 1998 British television film starring Gerard Butler
- Little White Lies a 2006 UK film starring Jonny Owen
- Little White Lies (2010 film), a French comedy-drama film

== Music ==
=== Albums ===
- Little White Lies (album), a 2009 album by Fastball

=== Songs ===
- "Little White Lie", a song by Sammy Hagar from Marching to Mars
- "Little White Lie", a song by The Sinceros from The Sound of Sunbathing
- "Little White Lies" (1930 song), a song written by Walter Donaldson
- "Little White Lies" (Florrie song)
- "Little White Lies" (One Direction song)
- "Little White Lies" (Status Quo song)
- "Little White Lies", a song by Bruce Springsteen on his 2015 album The Ties That Bind: The River Collection

== Other uses ==
- Little White Lie (web series), an online video series by StarKid Productions
- Little White Lies (magazine), a British film magazine

== See also ==
- White lie (disambiguation)
