= Gerard Butler filmography =

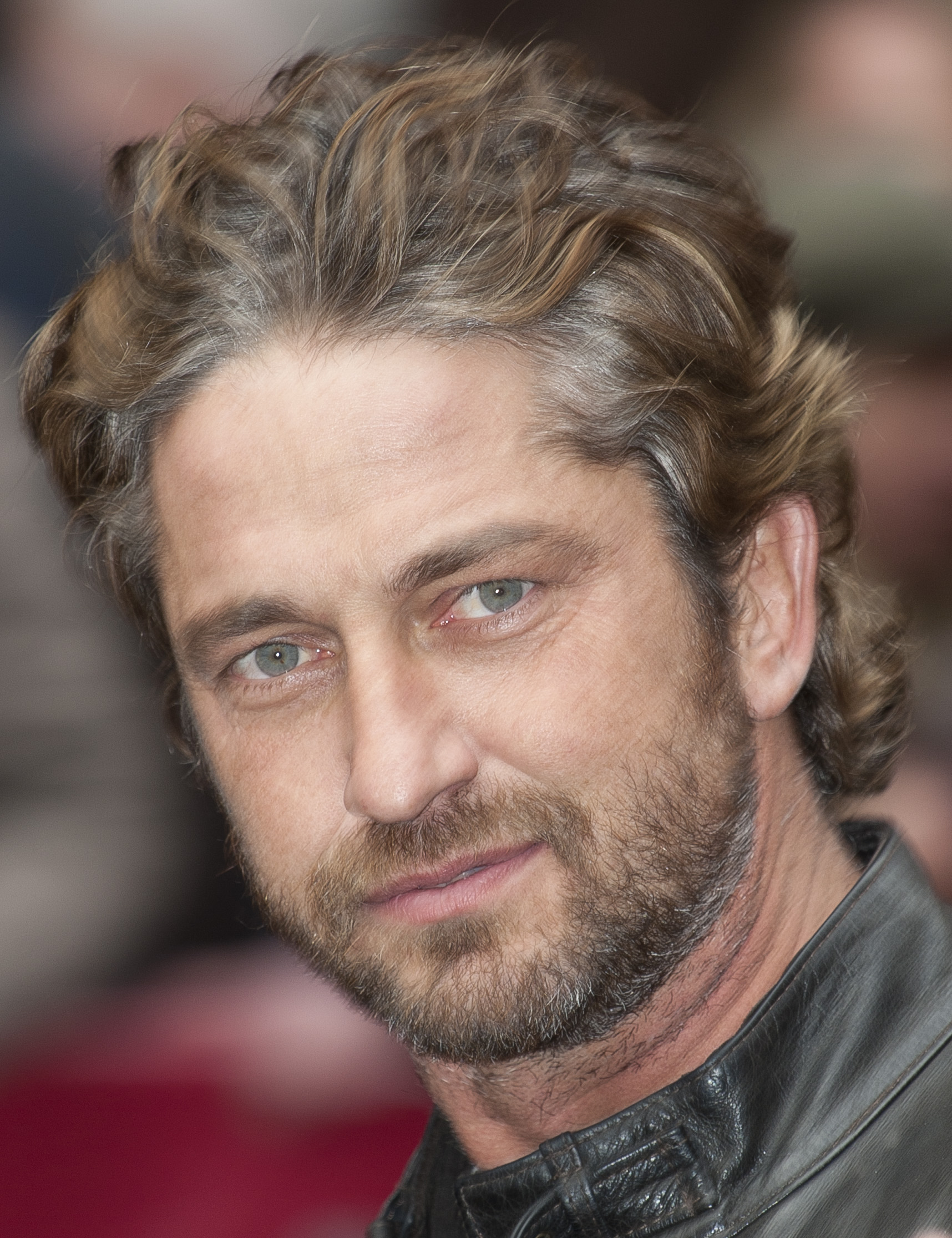
At the 2011 Berlin International Film Festival

Scottish actor Gerard Butler has been in numerous films and television series since his on-screen debut in 1997's Mrs Brown. After taking minor roles in releases such as the James Bond film Tomorrow Never Dies (1997) and the horror film Tale of the Mummy (1998), he took the lead in 2000, portraying Dracula in Dracula 2000. Butler co-starred in the films Reign of Fire (2002) alongside Matthew McConaughey and Christian Bale and Lara Croft: Tomb Raider – The Cradle of Life (2003) with Angelina Jolie, before playing André Marek in the adaptation of Michael Crichton's science fiction adventure Timeline (2003) with Paul Walker. Then, he was cast as Erik, The Phantom in Joel Schumacher's 2004 film adaptation of the musical The Phantom of the Opera alongside Emmy Rossum, and Butterfly on a Wheel with Pierce Brosnan and Maria Bello.

Although these films were important breaks, it was only in 2007 that Butler gained worldwide recognition for his portrayal of King Leonidas in Zack Snyder's 2007 fantasy war film 300. It earned him an MTV Movie Award for Best Fight and an Empire Award for Best Actor nominations. That same year, Butler starred in the romantic drama film P.S. I Love You with Hilary Swank. After appearing in the 2008 films Nim's Island with Jodie Foster and RocknRolla with Idris Elba and Tom Hardy, Butler took the lead in several 2009 films including the romantic comedy The Ugly Truth with Katherine Heigl and the thriller Law Abiding Citizen with Jamie Foxx.

In 2010, Butler voiced the role of Stoick the Vast in the animated action-fantasy film How to Train Your Dragon, a role he later reprised in subsequent How to Train Your Dragon franchise-related projects. He played military leader Tullus Aufidius in the 2011 film Coriolanus, the modernized adaptation of William Shakespeare's tragedy of the same name. He also portrayed Sam Childers in the 2011 action biopic Machine Gun Preacher. In 2012, Butler co-starred in the biopic drama film Chasing Mavericks with Jonny Weston, and the romantic comedy film Playing for Keeps with Jessica Biel. He starred as Mike Banning in the action thriller film Olympus Has Fallen in 2013, and the sequels London Has Fallen in 2016 and Angel Has Fallen in 2019, both opposite Morgan Freeman. He also had a minor part in the 2014 film 300: Rise of an Empire where he reprised his role as King Leonidas in a flashback.

Butler made his television debut in 1998's The Young Person's Guide to Becoming a Rock Star, portraying Marty Claymore. In the 2001 miniseries Attila, Butler took the title role, and the following year he was cast as Johnnie Donne in The Jury.

== Film ==
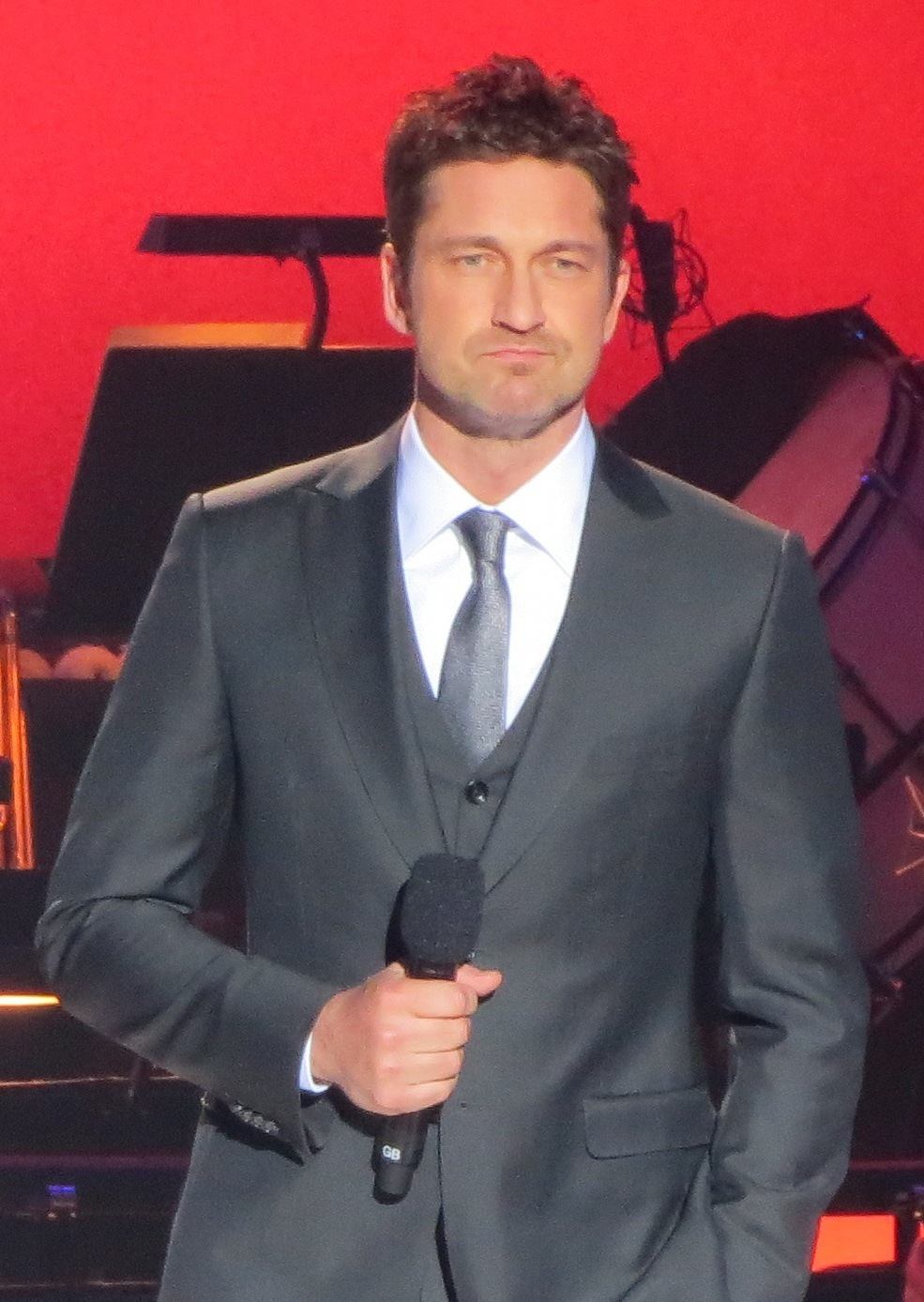
At the Nobel Peace Prize Concert in Oslo, Norway in December 2012

Year	Title	Role	Notes	Ref.
1997	Mrs Brown	Archie Brown		
1997	Tomorrow Never Dies	Leading Seaman – HMS Devonshire		
1998	Tale of the Mummy	Burke		
1998	Fast Food	Jacko		
1999	One More Kiss	Sam	Credited as Gerry Butler	
1999	The Cherry Orchard	Yasha		
2000	Shooters	Jackie Junior		
2000	Dracula 2000	Count Dracula / Judas Iscariot		
2000	Harrison's Flowers	Chris Kumac		
2001	Jewel of the Sahara	Charles Belamy	Short film	
2001	Please!	Peter	Short film; credited as Gerry Butler	
2002	Reign of Fire	Creedy		
2003	Lara Croft: Tomb Raider – The Cradle of Life	Terry Sheridan		
2003	Timeline	André Marek		
2004	Dear Frankie	The Stranger		
2004	The Phantom of the Opera	Erik, The Phantom		
2005	The Game of Their Lives	Frank Borghi		
2005	Beowulf & Grendel	Beowulf		
2006	Shadow Company	Narrator / James Ashcroft	Voice; documentary	
2006	Wrath of Gods	Himself	Documentary; also co-producer	
2006	300	King Leonidas		
2007	Butterfly on a Wheel	Neil Randall		
2007	P.S. I Love You	Gerry Kennedy		
2008	Nim's Island	Jack Rusoe / Alex Rover		
2008	RocknRolla	One Two		
2009	Watchmen	The Captain	Voice; segment: "Tales of the Black Freighter"	
2009	The Ugly Truth	Mike Chadway		
2009	Gamer	Kable / John Tillman		
2009	Law Abiding Citizen	Clyde Shelton	Also producer	
2010	The Bounty Hunter	Milo Boyd		
2010	How to Train Your Dragon	Stoick the Vast	Voice	
2010	Legend of the Boneknapper Dragon	Stoick the Vast	Voice; short film	
2011	Dragons: Gift of the Night Fury	Stoick the Vast	Voice; short film	
2011	Coriolanus	Tullus Aufidius		
2011	Na Nai'a: Legend of the Dolphins	Narrator	Voice	
2011	Machine Gun Preacher	Sam Childers	Also executive producer	
2012	Chasing Mavericks	Frosty Hesson	Also executive producer	
2012	Playing for Keeps	George Dryer	Also producer	
2013	Movie 43	Leprechaun 1 & 2	Segment: "Happy Birthday"	
2013	Olympus Has Fallen	Mike Banning	Also producer	
2014	How to Train Your Dragon 2	Stoick the Vast	Voice	
2014	300: Rise of an Empire	King Leonidas	Cameo	
2015	Septembers of Shiraz	—N/a	Producer	
2016	Gods of Egypt	Set		
2016	London Has Fallen	Mike Banning	Also producer	
2016	A Family Man	Dane Jensen	Also producer	
2017	Geostorm	Jacob "Jake" Lawson		
2018	Den of Thieves	Nick "Big Nick" O'Brien	Also producer	
2018	The Vanishing	James	Also producer	
2018	Hunter Killer	Joe Glass	Also producer	
2019	How to Train Your Dragon: The Hidden World	Stoick the Vast	Voice	
2019	Them That Follow	—N/a	Producer	
2019	Angel Has Fallen	Mike Banning	Also producer	
2020	Greenland	John Garrity	Also producer	
2021	Copshop	Bob Viddick	Also producer	
2022	Last Seen Alive	Will Spann	Also producer	
2023	Plane	Brodie Torrance	Also producer	
2023	Kandahar	Tom Harris	Also producer	
2025	Den of Thieves 2: Pantera	Nick "Big Nick" O'Brien	Also producer	
2025	Naya: Legend of the Golden Dolphin	King Kula	Voice	
2025	How to Train Your Dragon	Stoick the Vast		
2025	In the Hand of Dante	Louie / Pope Bonifacio		
2026	Greenland 2: Migration	John Garrity	Also producer	
2027	How to Train Your Dragon 2 †	Stoick the Vast	Filming	
TBA	Empire City †	Rhett	Post-production; also producer	
TBA	All-Star Weekend †	TBA	Completed	

Key
†	Denotes films that have not yet been released

== Television ==
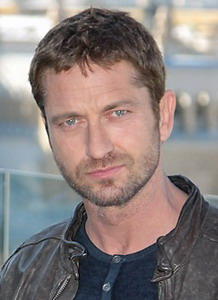
In March 2013

Year	Title	Role	Notes	Ref.
1998	The Young Person's Guide to Becoming a Rock Star	Marty Claymore	6 episodes	
1998	Little White Lies	Peter	Television film	
1999	Lucy Sullivan Is Getting Married	Gus	14 episodes	
2001	An Unsuitable Job for a Woman	Tim Bolton	Episode: "Playing God"	
2001	Attila	Attila	Miniseries	
2002	The Jury	Johnnie Donne	6 episodes	
2009	Saturday Night Live	Himself	Guest host; also portraying various characters for sketches	
2024	Ark: The Animated Series	Gaius Marcellus Nerva	Voice	
2024	Paris Has Fallen	—N/a	8 episodes; executive producer	
2024	The Night Before In Wonderland	Santa Claus	Television film	
2026	Apollo Has Fallen	—N/a	Executive producer	
