= Another Man's War =

2009 novel by Sam Childers

- Author: Sam Childers
- Language: English
- Publisher: Thomas Nelson
- Publication date: 2009
- Publication place: United States
- Media type: Print

Another Man's War is a 2009 book written by Sam Childers about his life as a former gang biker turned preacher and defender of South Sudanese orphans.

The book was the basis of Machine Gun Preacher, a 2011 biographical adventure drama film starring Gerard Butler.

The book bears the endorsement from South Sudan President Salva Kiir, "The Reverend Sam Childers has been a very close friend to the government of South Sudan for many years and is a trusted friend."
