= Flørli Hydroelectric Power Station =

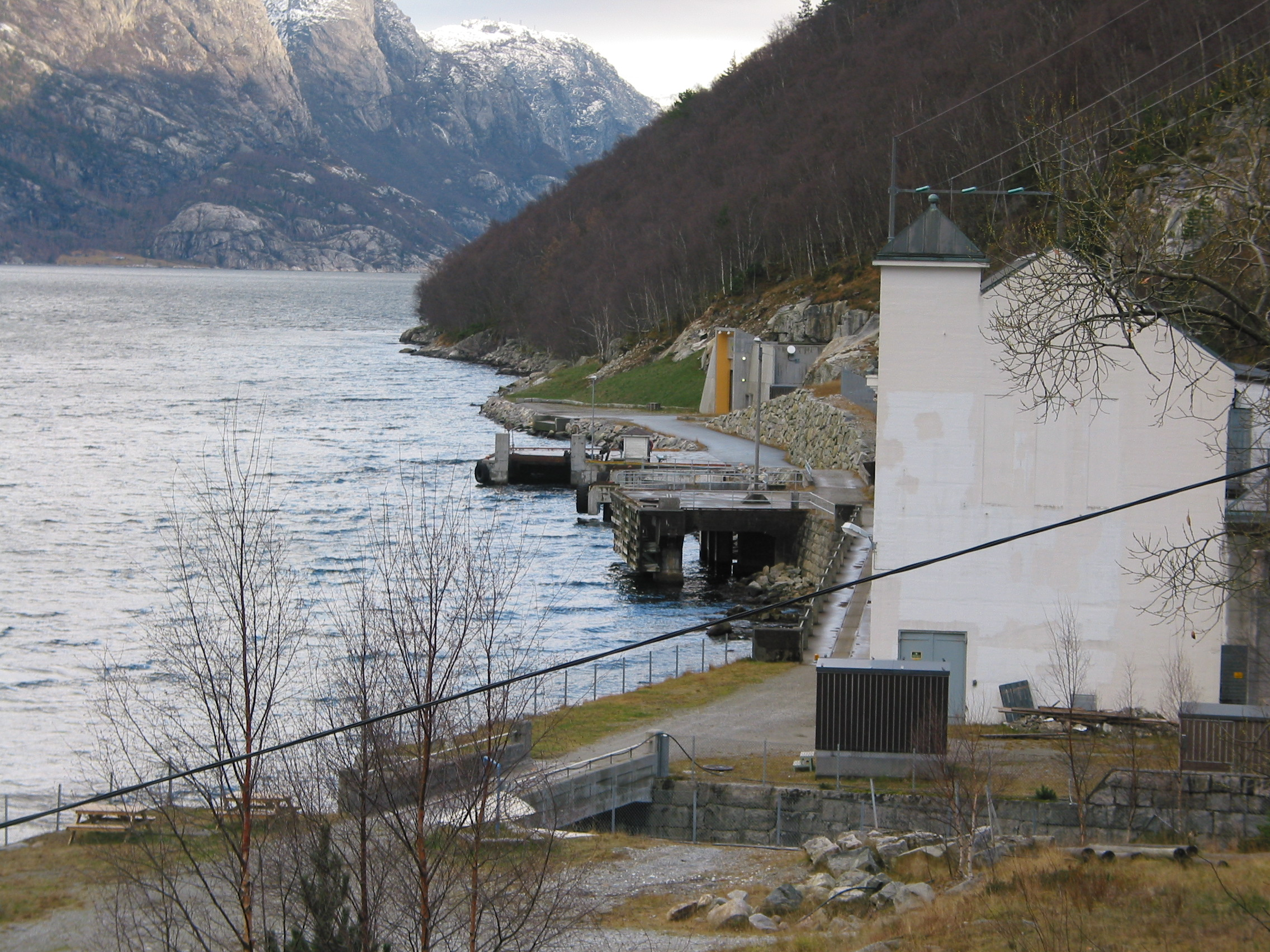
- Flørli old (front) and new (rear) Hydroelectric Power Station
- Official name: Flørli kraftverk
- Country: Norway
- Location: Flørli, Sandnes
- Coordinates: 59.01543°N 6.43283°E
- Status: Operational
- Construction began: 1917
- Opening date: 1918; 107 years ago
- Owner: Lyse Energi

Reservoir
- Creates: Store Flørvatnet

Power Station
- Hydraulic head: 777 m
- Installed capacity: 80 MW
- Capacity factor: 41.4%
- Annual generation: 290 GW·h

The Flørli Power Station is a hydroelectric power station located on the shores of Lysefjord in the municipality Sandnes in Rogaland, Norway. The station was built in 1918 as the first in Lysefjord, from where it delivered power to Stavanger. The turbine hall was built in 1917 in Jugendstil, it is 80 m long, 9 m wide and stands 12 m tall. The water was supplied via two penstocks along which were built a cabled railway and a wooden stairway with 4,444 steps.

In 1999 a new power station with new penstocks was built into the mountain next to the old one which was decommissioned. The new station can generate 80 MW power and has an average annual production of 290 GWh.

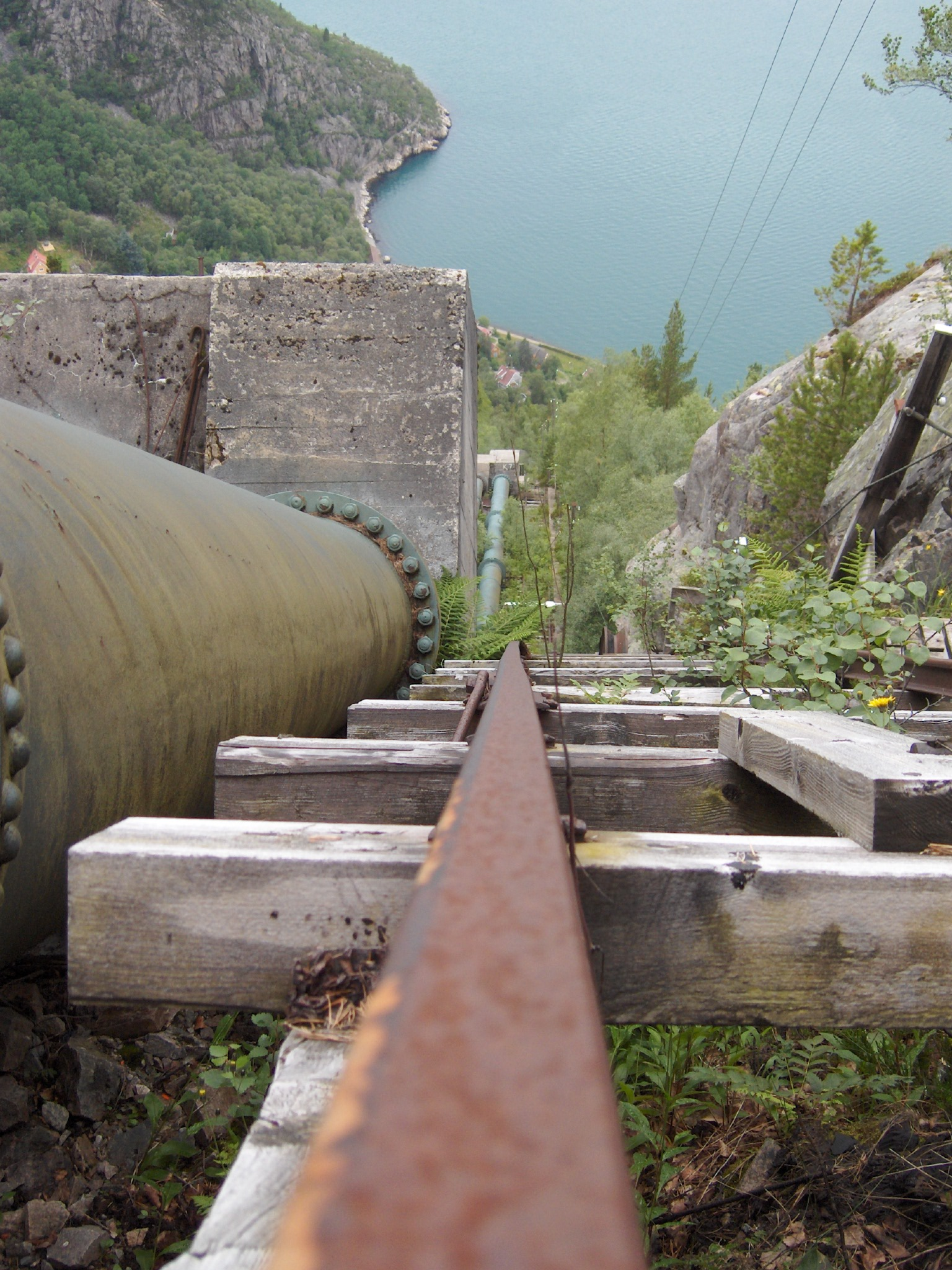
One penstock and one rail of the cabled railway from the old power station

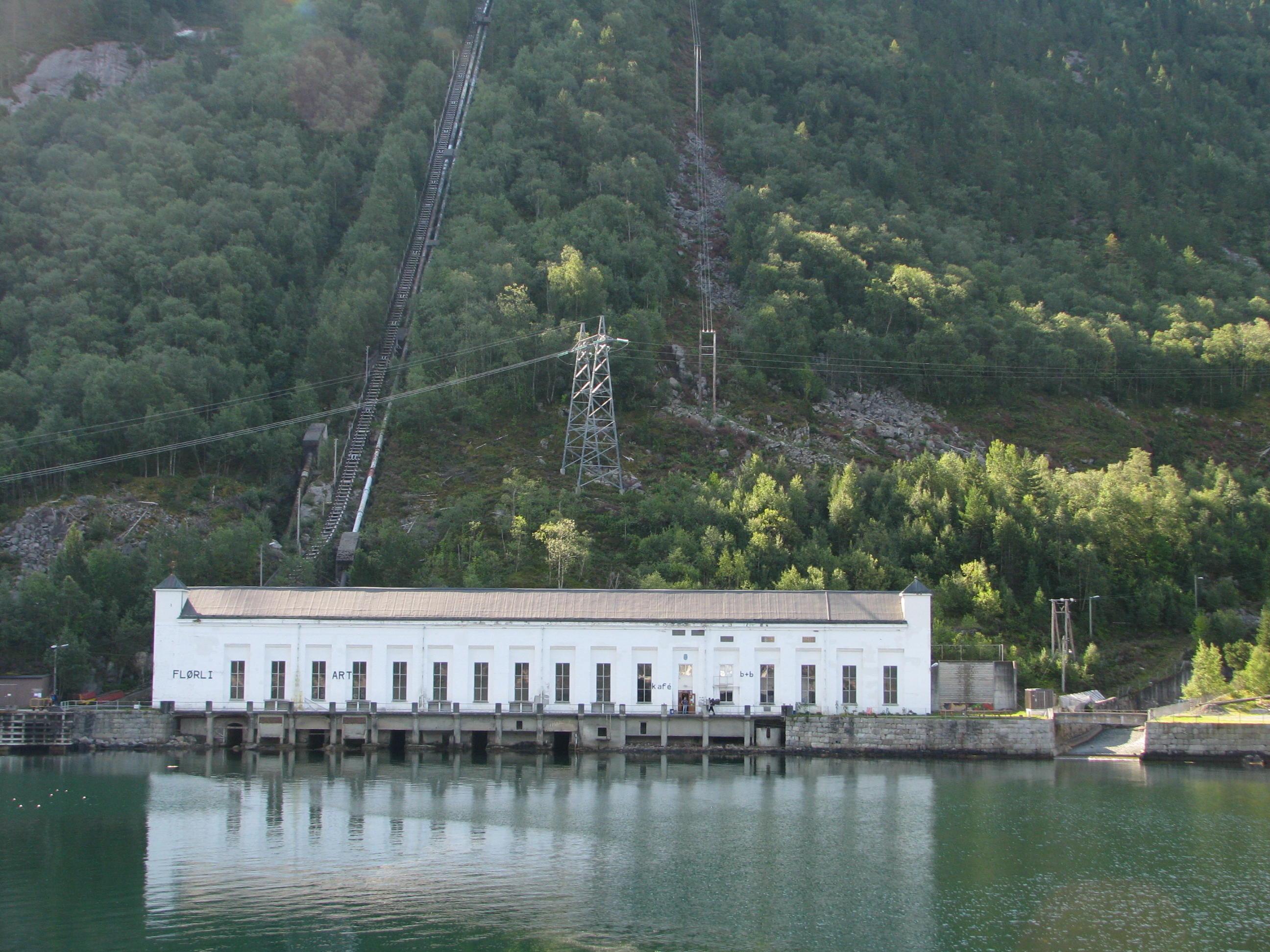
Front view of the old power station

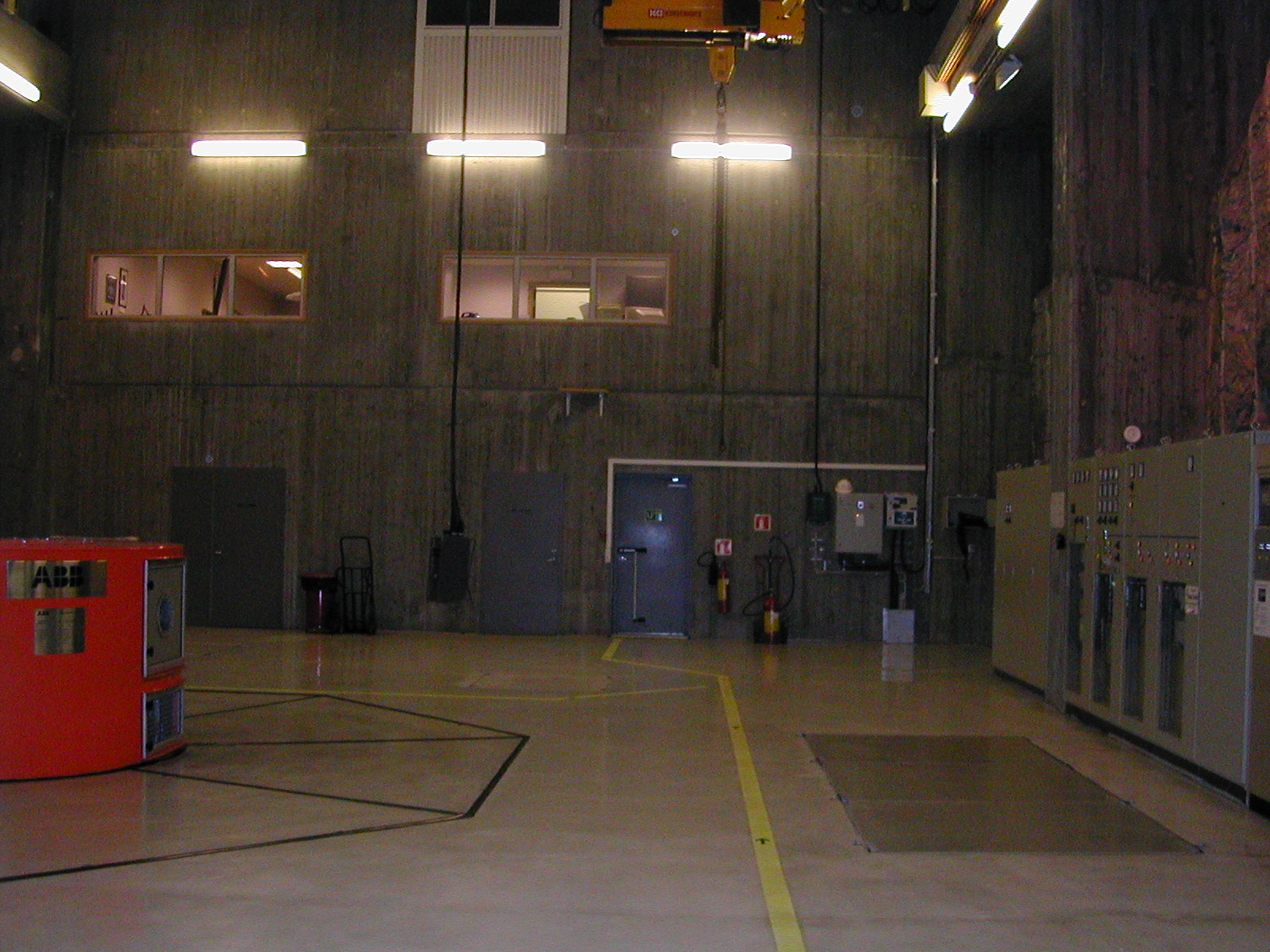
Inside the new power station with the control room behind the windows

== See also ==
- Lysebotn Hydroelectric Power Station
