= True Lies (disambiguation) =

True Lies is a 1994 American action comedy film written and directed by James Cameron and starring Arnold Schwarzenegger.

True Lies may also refer to:

== True Lies franchise ==
- True Lies (TV series), a television series based on the film airing on CBS
- True Lies (video game), a 1994 top-view action shooting game based on the film
- True Lies: Music from the Motion Picture, a 1994 soundtrack album to the eponymous film True Lies

== Other uses ==
- "True Lies" (Hangin' with Mr. Cooper), a 1995 television episode
- "True Lies" (The Vampire Diaries), a 2013 television episode
- "True Lies" (song), a 1997 single by Sara Evans
- True Lies (album), by Belgian band Dive released in 1999
- "True Lies" (Black Milk song), a song on the album Fever released in 2018

== See also ==
- True (disambiguation)
- Lies (disambiguation)
