= Thor Alex Kappfjell =

Norwegian offshore oil worker and BASE jumper

Thor Alex Kappfjell was a Norwegian offshore oil worker and BASE jumper. He is famous for parachuting from the observation deck of the World Trade Center's South tower in 1999. Previously, he had jumped from the 86th floor of the observation deck of the Empire State Building and the 61st floor of the Chrysler Building (on October 24 and 27, 1998 respectively). Kappfjell claimed to have jumped more than 200 mountains and buildings (radio/television masts, bridges, the Eiffel Tower, etc.) in his daredevil career.

== World Trade Center jump ==
On March 25, 1999, Kappfjell ignored threats from Mayor Rudolph Giuliani and Police Commissioner Howard Safir and was able to get past the heightened post-bombing-of-1993 security and make his way up the South tower. Kappfjell later on claimed that he used a disguise, but wouldn't go into more detail about how he gave security the slip.

Kappfjell landed on West Street in a small construction area between the north and southbound lanes. Without pausing (except to snap some photos), he packed his parachute away and disappeared into the World Financial Center. On March 26, along with his cousin and photographer, he was arrested in his midtown hotel room. He was charged with reckless endangerment and criminal trespassing while his accomplices were charged with obstructing government administration.

== Lawsuit ==
Kappfjell later filed a $2.25 million lawsuit against "Extra", the syndicated television show, seeking damages for breach of contract and fraud. Kappfjell told The New York Post that he was planning to leave the city immediately after the jump, but Barry Levine ("Extra"'s managing editor), had told him to wait until the next morning to be paid for footage of the WTC jump. (He had sold videos of previous jumps to the show.) But, to Kappfjell's surprise, the "Extra" film crew showed up, along with the police the next morning, and Levine was nowhere to be seen.

== Death ==
On July 5, 1999, Kappfjell was killed in a jump off Kjerag mountain in Norway. Having lost his bearings in the night fog, he crashed into the side of the mountain. His body was found at the base of the cliff, parachute open. Fellow jumpers suspected that he hit the face of the cliff and slid down. He was 32 years old.

== See also ==
- BASE jumping
