= Lyse AS =

Norwegian utility company

- Type: Municipal owned
- Industry: Power and telecommunications
- Founded: 1998
- Headquarters: Stavanger, Norway
- Area served: Whole Rogaland
- Key people: Rosalie Poen (CEO); Kristoffer Birkedal (Chairman) for period 2024-2026
- Products: Electricity; Natural gas Broadband; Television; District heating District cooling Biogas; Home automation
- Revenue: ▲NOK 23 279 million (2023)
- Owner: 16 municipalities
- Number of employees: 2046 (2023)
- Website: www.lysekonsern.no
- Footnotes; Year report 2023: https://www.lysekonsern.no/getfile.php/1312320-1711098020/Dokumenter%20Finans/Rapporter/2023/%C3%85rsrapport%202023.pdf; Board members: https://www.lysekonsern.no/om-oss/styre-og-ledelse/lyses-bedriftsforsamling

Lyse (named after Lysefjorden in Ryfylke) is an industrial and multi-utility company based in Jæren and Ryfylke, Norway. The company has a yearly normal production of 9.5 TWh of hydroelectric power, develops and maintains the power grid in 14 municipalities as well as deliver fiberoptic broadband (Altibox) and other telecommunication services, natural gas distribution, district heating, retailing and installation services. The company's head office is located in Stavanger, Norway.

The company is owned by the municipalities of Stavanger (45.74%), Sandnes (19.53%), Sola (8.74%), Time (5.83%), Klepp (4.23%), Hå (3.78%), Randaberg (3.28%), Eigersund (2.95%), Strand (2.53%), Hjelmeland (0.99%), Gjesdal (0.93%), Lund (0.71%), Bjerkreim (0.51%) and Kvitsøy (0.23%).

== Power plants ==
Through Lyse Kraft DA (74.4%) the company owns the hydroelectric power stations of Suldal I, Suldal II, Røldal, Novle, Kvanndalen, Middyr, Svandalsfona, Hjelmeland, Breiava, Flørli, Hauskje, Hetland, Lysebotn II, Maudal, Oltesvik, Sviland, Tjodan, Vasstøl, Midtlæger, Ulla-Førre and Sira-Kvina.

The company also has shares in Jørpeland hydroelectric power station and in thermal power plant Bærheim.

== History ==
Lyse's roots go back to the establishment of the first electricity plants at the beginning of the 20th century, which became the engine in the industrialization and modernization of Norway. In 1947, the company Lyse Kraft DA was established with the aim of expanding the hydropower resources in Lysebotn. The name Lyse is inspired by the Lyse river in Lysebotn.

The company was founded in 1999 as a merger between the municipal power companies in Stavanger, Sandnes, Sola, Time as well as Ryfylke Energi and Lyse Kraft.

In 2015, the company changed its name from Lyse Energi AS to Lyse AS.

In 2020, the company merged its portfolio power plants with Hydro, becoming one of the largest hydroelectric power producers in Norway. As a part of the transaction Hydro acquired the operatorship of Lyse's power plants.

In March 2022, Ice Group sold its operating activities to Lyse AS.

== See also ==
- Scotland-Norway interconnector
