= Tjodan Hydroelectric Power Station =

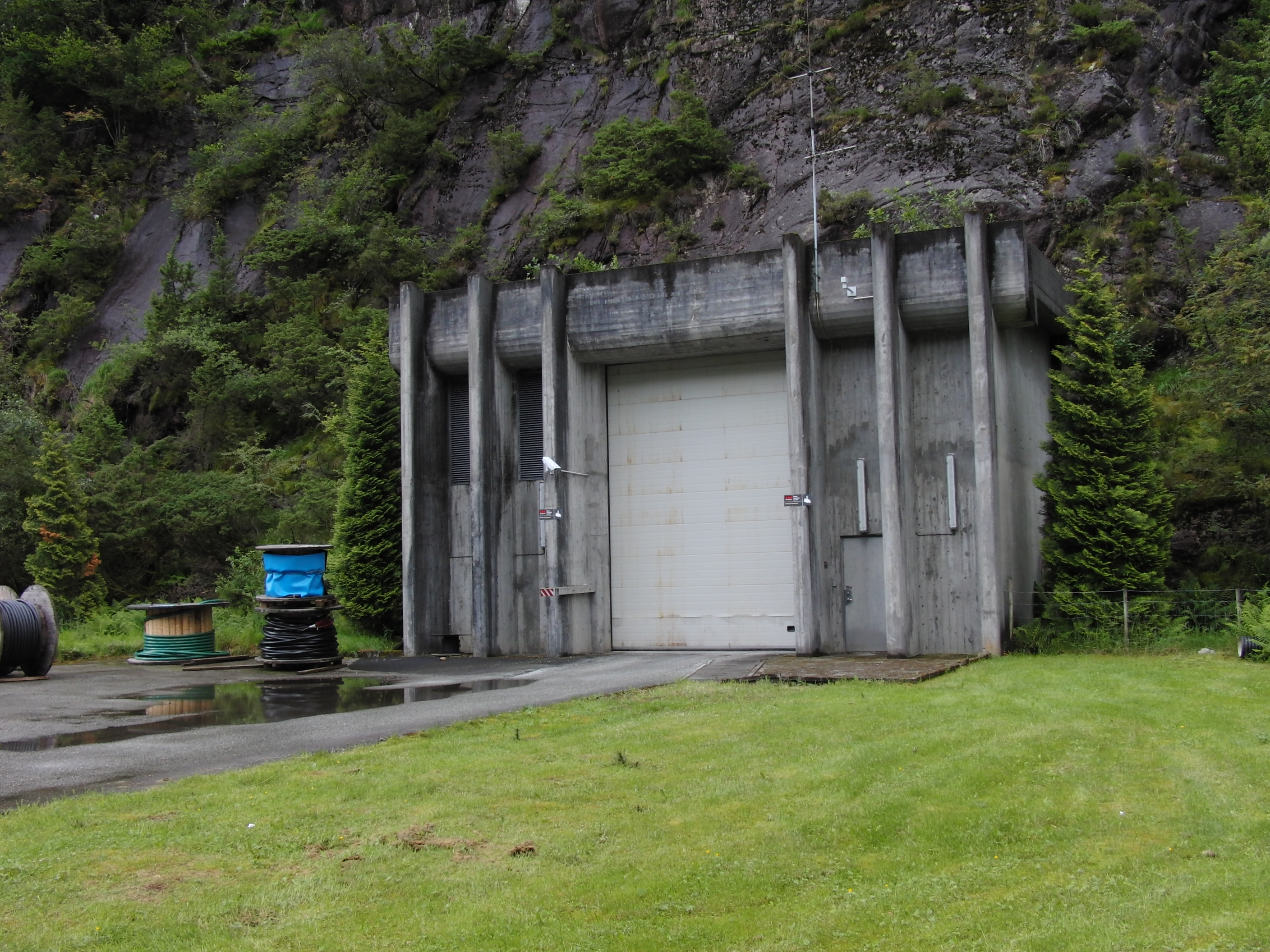
- Interactive map of Tjodan Hydroelectric Power Station
- Official name: Tjodan kraftverk
- Country: Norway
- Location: Lysebotn, Sandnes Municipality
- Coordinates: 59°03′08″N 6°39′09″E
- Status: Operational
- Opening date: 1985; 41 years ago
- Owner: Lyse Energi

Power Station
- Hydraulic head: 892 metres (2,927 ft)
- Installed capacity: 110 MW
- Capacity factor: 32.2%
- Annual generation: 310 GW·h

The Tjodan Power Station is a hydroelectric power station located in Lysebotn in Sandnes Municipality in Rogaland county, Norway. It operates at an installed capacity of 110 megawatts (150,000 hp), with an average annual production of about 310 gigawatt-hours (1,100 TJ). It opened in 1985.

The power plant collects water resources from six bodies of water in Tjodanvassdraget, the mountain plateau north of Lysefjorden. The fall height is 892 metres (2,927 ft) and the installed output is 110 megawatts (150,000 hp).
