= Lyse Chapel =

Church in Rogaland, Norway

- Lyse kapell
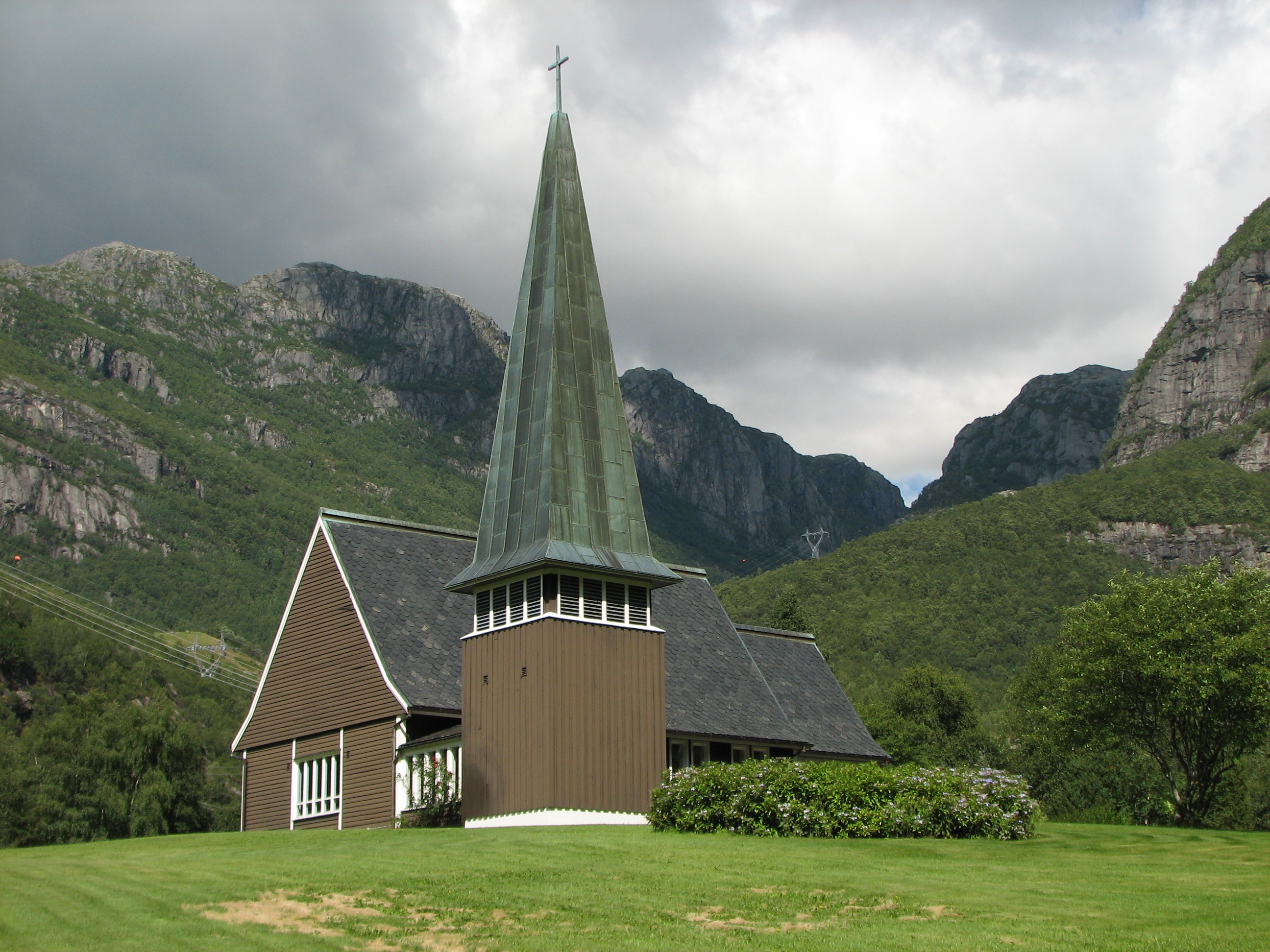
- View of the church
- Lyse Chapel
- 59.058557°N 6.663248°E
- Location: Sandnes Municipality, Rogaland
- Country: Norway
- Denomination: Church of Norway
- Churchmanship: Evangelical Lutheran

History
- Status: Parish church
- Founded: 1961
- Consecrated: 28 May 1961

Architecture
- Functional status: Active
- Architect(s): Gustav Helland and Endre Årreberg
- Architectural type: Long church
- Completed: 1961

Specifications
- Capacity: 150
- Materials: Wood

Administration
- Diocese: Stavanger bispedømme
- Deanery: Sandnes prosti
- Parish: Forsand
- Norwegian Cultural Heritage Site
- Type: Church
- Status: Not protected
- ID: 84355

Lyse Chapel (Norwegian: Lyse kapell) is a parish church of the Church of Norway in the eastern part of the large Sandnes Municipality in Rogaland county, Norway. It is located in the very small village of Lysebotn, at the end of the Lysefjorden. It is one of the two churches for the Forsand parish which is part of the Sandnes prosti (deanery) in the Diocese of Stavanger. The brown, wooden church was built in a long church design in 1961 using designs by the architects Gustav Helland and Endre Årreberg. The church seats about 150 people.

The church was consecrated on 28 May 1961 by the Bishop Fridtjov Birkeli. The church is not used often, since there are only about a dozen residents in the isolated village of Lysebotn. In 2009, Forsand Municipality tried to close and sell the chapel, but they changed their mind due to the opposition of the residents.

The chapel was located in Forsand Municipality until 1 January 2020 when Forsand became part of Sandnes Municipality.

== Media gallery ==
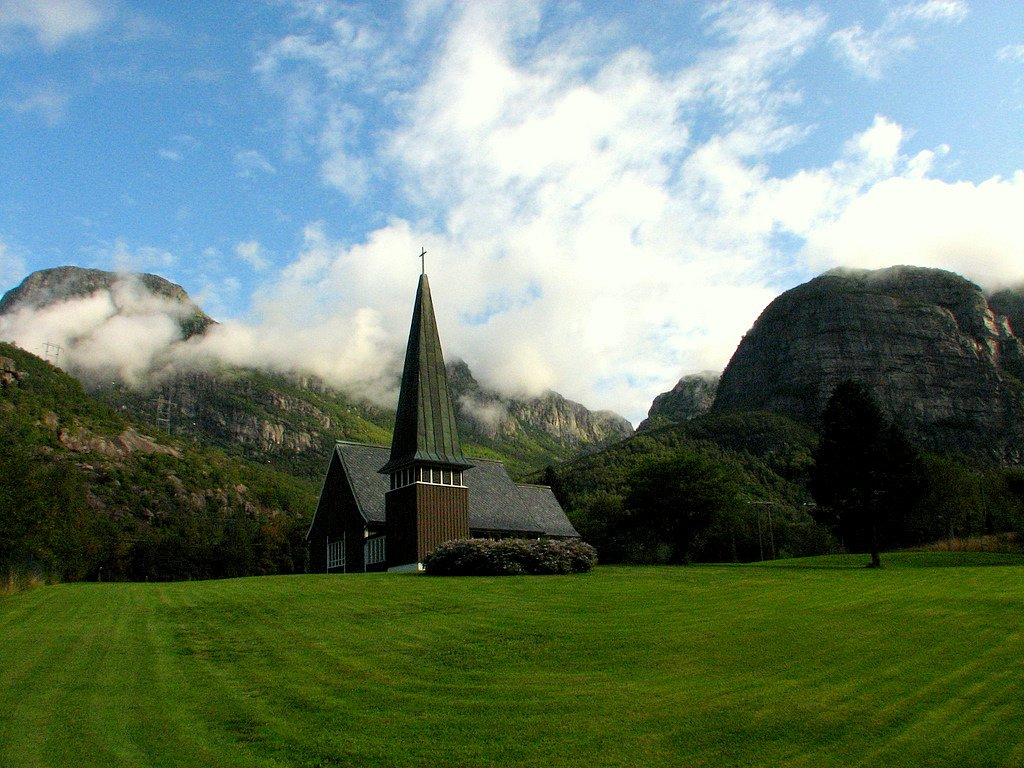

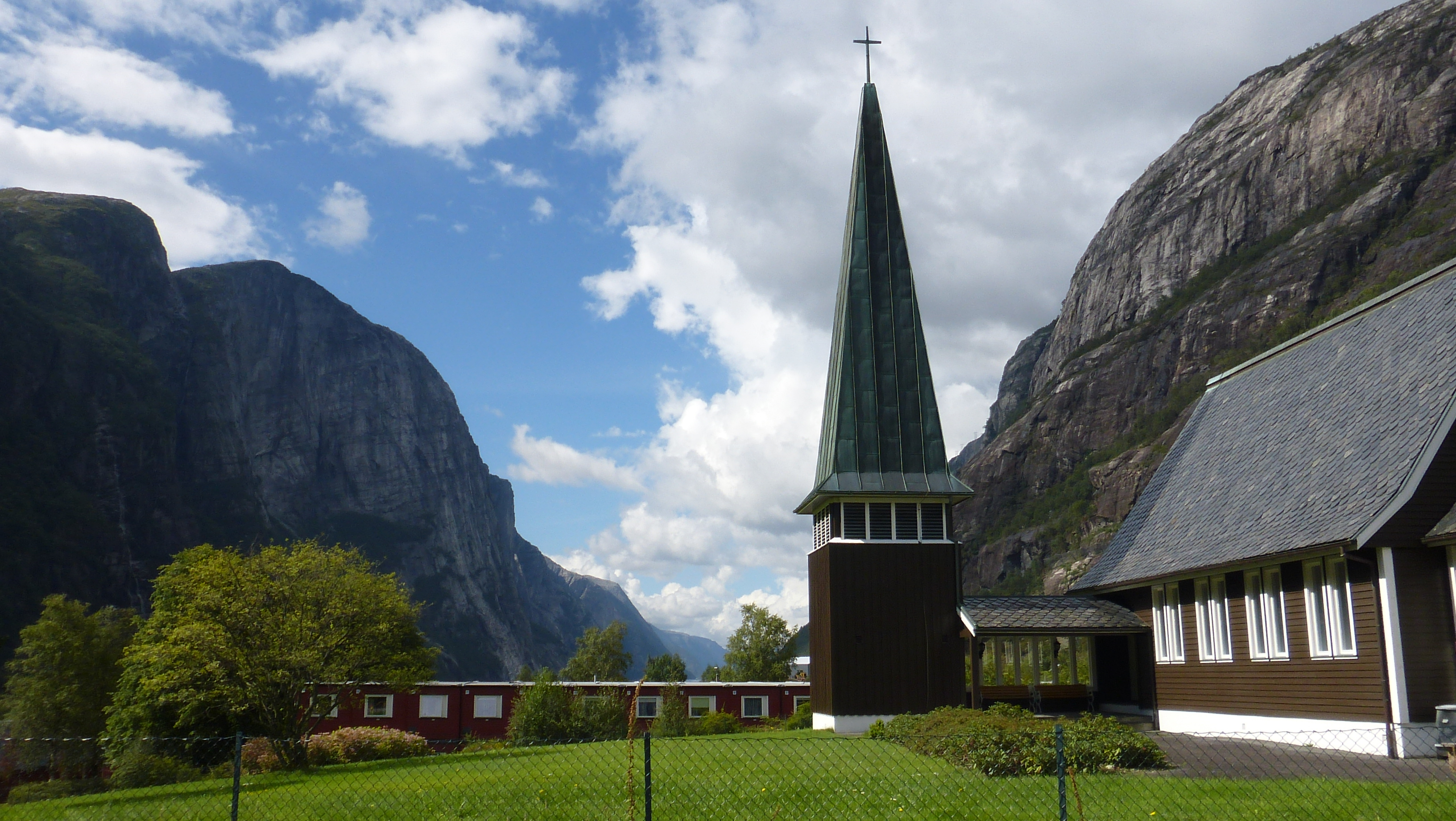

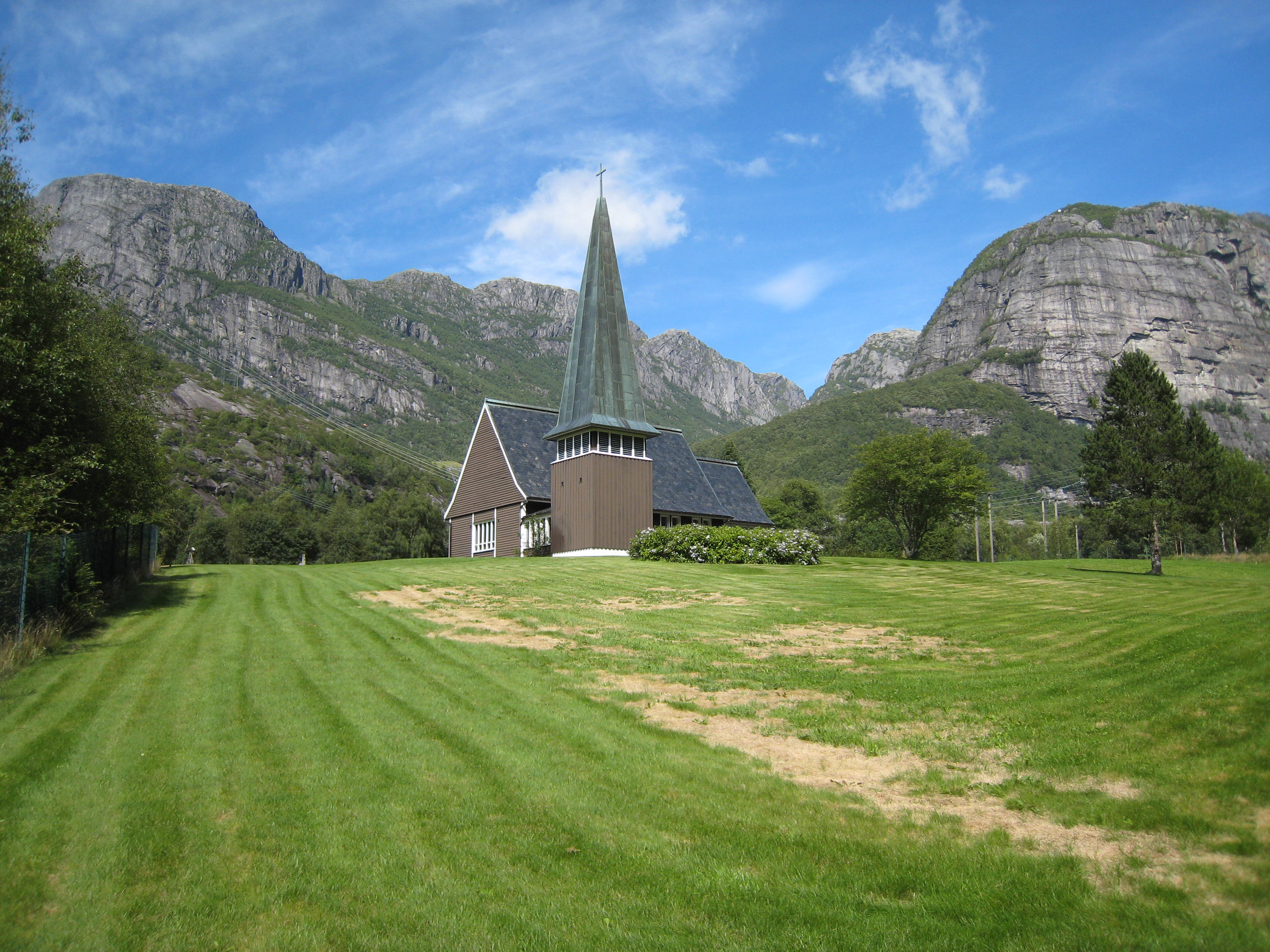

== See also ==
- List of churches in Rogaland
