= Kjerag =

Mountain in Rogaland, Norway

- Kiragg (unofficial)
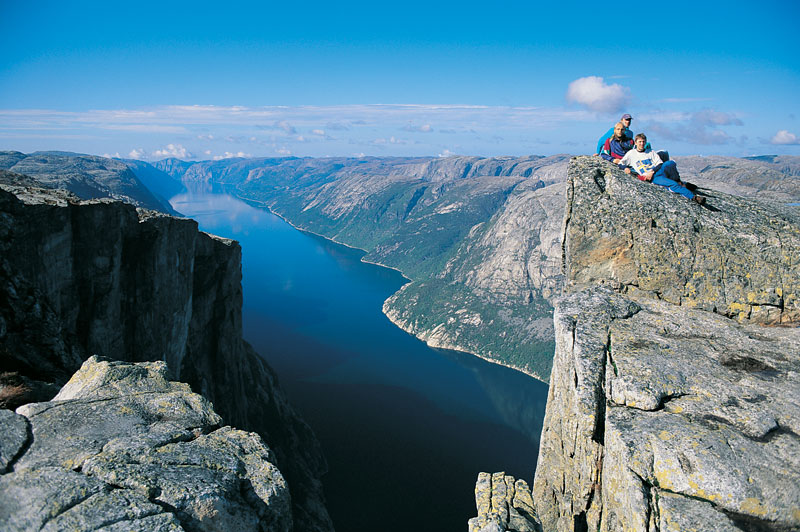
- The fjord seen from the northern cliff of Kjerag

Highest point
- Elevation: 1,132 m (3,714 ft)
- Prominence: 55 m (180 ft)
- Parent peak: Varmekroheia
- Isolation: 1 km (0.62 mi)
- Coordinates: 59°01′21″N 6°35′16″E

Geography
- Location: Rogaland, Norway
- Topo map: 1313 III Lyngsvatnet

Climbing
- Easiest route: Øygardsstølen

Kjerag is a mountain in the Sandnes municipality in Rogaland county, Norway. The 1,132-metre (3,714 ft) tall mountain sits on the southern shore of Lysefjorden, just southwest of the village of Lysebotn. Its northern side is a massive cliff, plunging 984 metres (3,228 ft) almost straight down to the fjord; a sight which attracts many visitors each year. Another tourist attraction, the Kjeragbolten, is a 5-cubic-metre (180 cu ft) stone wedged between two rocks is located on the mountain. The Kjeragfossen waterfall plunges off the mountain down to the fjord. It is one of the tallest waterfalls in the world.

Kjerag is a popular hiking destination. Some go there because Preikestolen has become too crowded, some to jump onto Kjeragbolten and some BASE jumpers from all over the world go there to jump off the high cliffs. Kjerag is also a popular climbing destination, with many difficult routes going up its steep faces. The easiest ascent starts from the visitor center Øygardsstølen, with a 2.5-3-hour walk each way. From Stavanger, it is roughly a 2-hour drive (closed in winter season). One can also take the tourist ferry from Lauvvik to Lysebotn in summer. The best season for walking is considered late June to September depending on snow conditions.

== Kjeragbolten ==
Kjeragbolten is a 5-cubic-metre (180 cu ft) boulder wedged in a mountain crevice by the edge of the Kjerag mountain (59°2′1.3″N 6°35′34.9″E). It is possible to walk onto the rock without any equipment, but there is a direct 241-metre (791 ft) drop below and then another 735-metre (2,411 ft) gradient down to the Lysefjorden. The name means "Kjerag Boulder" or "Kjerag Bolt".

== BASE jumping ==
Kjerag has become a popular BASE jumping destination. Since 1994, when Stein Edvartsen made the first officially registered jump, until 2016, a total number of 48,668 jumps have been registered. During this time period 131 accidents have been registered, 44 of which required the use of rescue helicopter, and 10 cases where jumpers were rescued by other professional rescue climbers. According to the Norwegian Broadcasting Corporation there have been 11 fatal accidents involving BASE jumpers alone. A list of jumpers who perished at Kjerag is provided below:

- Sebastian Dectot (24, from France), August 16, 1996
- Ulla-Stina Östberg (46, from Sweden), July 29, 1997
- Thor Alex Kappfjell (32, from Norway), July 6, 1999
- Kirill Goretov (29, from Russia), August 15, 1999
- Terry Forrestal (52, from the United Kingdom), June 10, 2000
- Valentino Venturi (30, from Italy), August 5, 2000
- Lori Barr (37, from the United States), July 23, 2002
- Rob Tompkins (30, from the United States), September 12, 2002
- Darcy Zoitsas (nickname: "Peter Pan") (39, from Australia), July 19, 2005
- Anton Knestyapin (25, from Russia), July 25, 2010
- Michael Leming (53, from the United States), June 25, 2016

In the Norwegian documentary film Loop, Kristen Reagan climbs up the 1,000-metre (3,300 ft) drop before BASE jumping off the same cliff.

=== Rock climbing ===
Kjerag was first climbed in the spring of 1985 by Pat Littlejohn, Steve Jones, Dick Renshaw and Lyndsey Foulkes, who abseiled in without sighting the wall from below, and chose their route from photographs in the public domain. Pete Whittaker having performed a roped solo of Free-Rider on El Capitan in autumn 2016, free-soloed the Renshaw-Foulkes climb in summer 2020.

== Name ==
The name is possibly a compound of kje which means 'kid' and ragg which means 'goat's hair' or 'shaggy fur'. The rough surface of the mountainside has been compared with the shaggy hair of a kid goat.

== Gallery ==
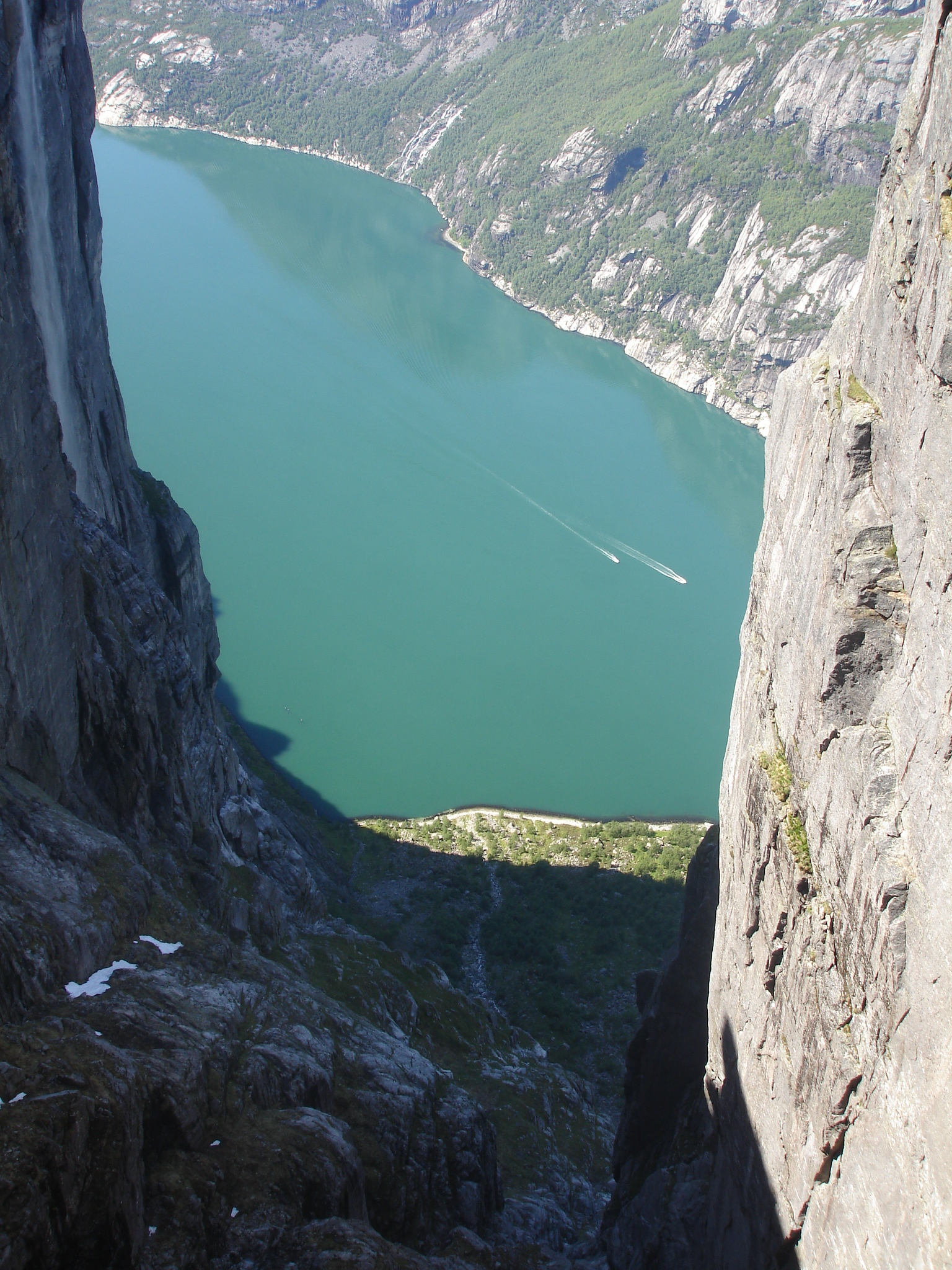
View from Kjeragbolten, Lysefjorden below

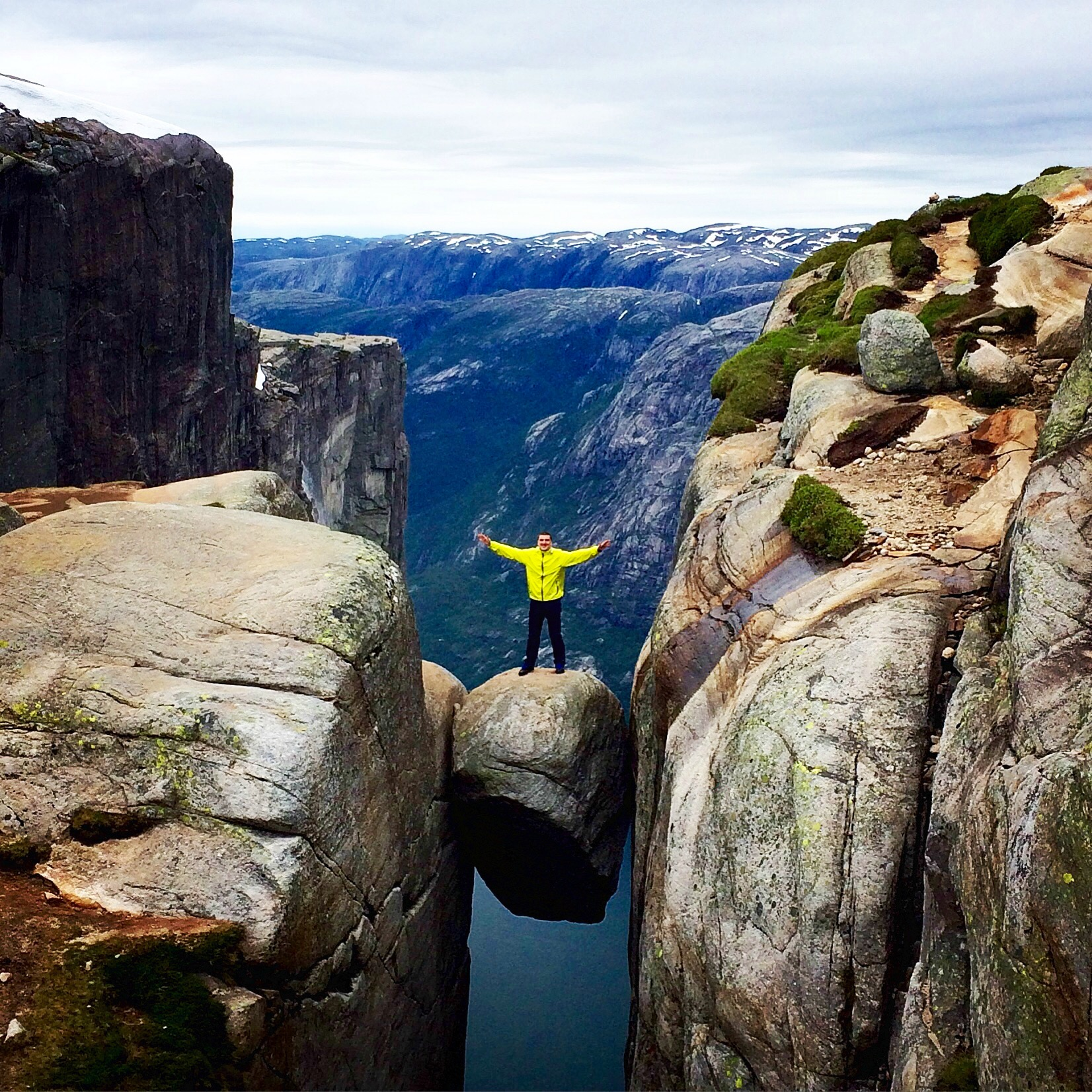

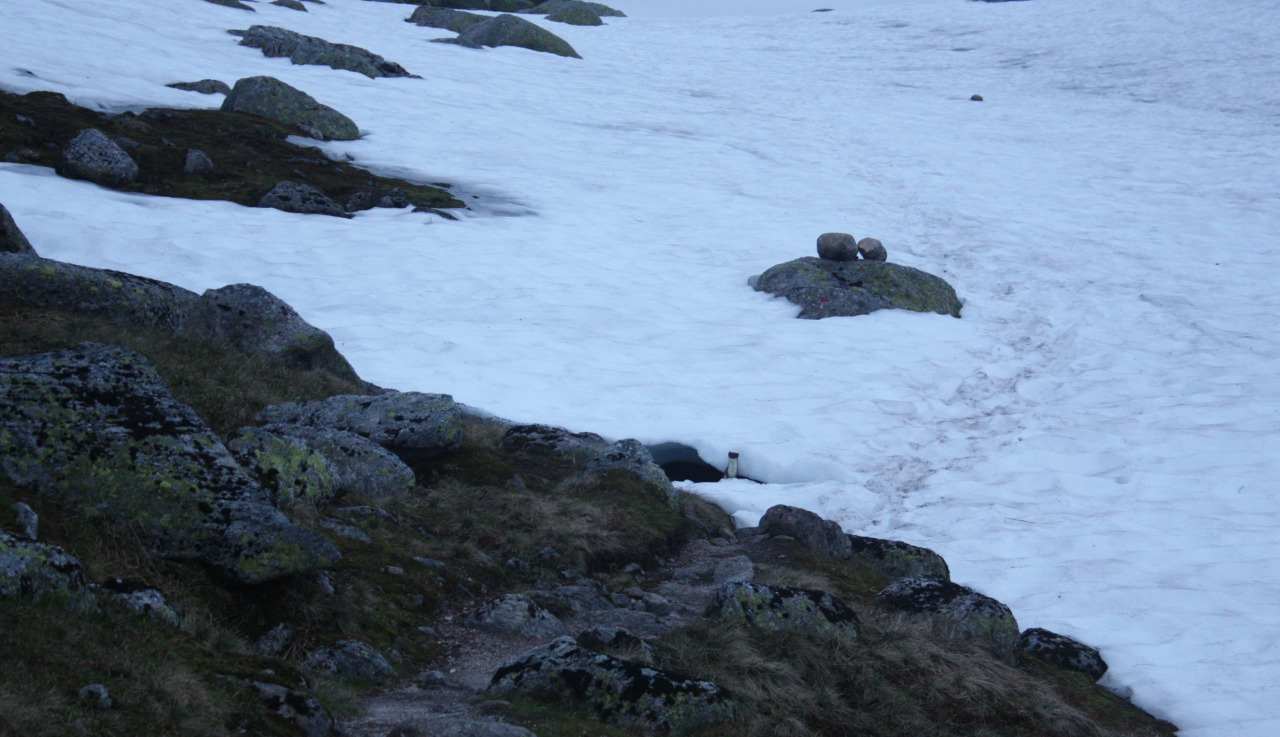
Stoat

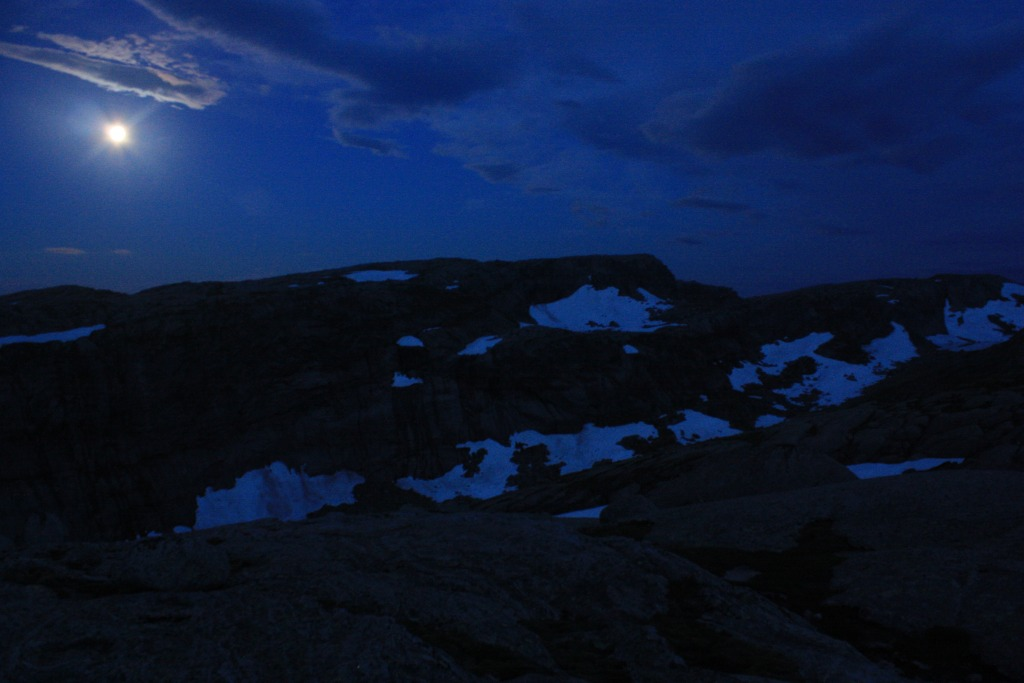
Fullmoon over Kjerag mountain

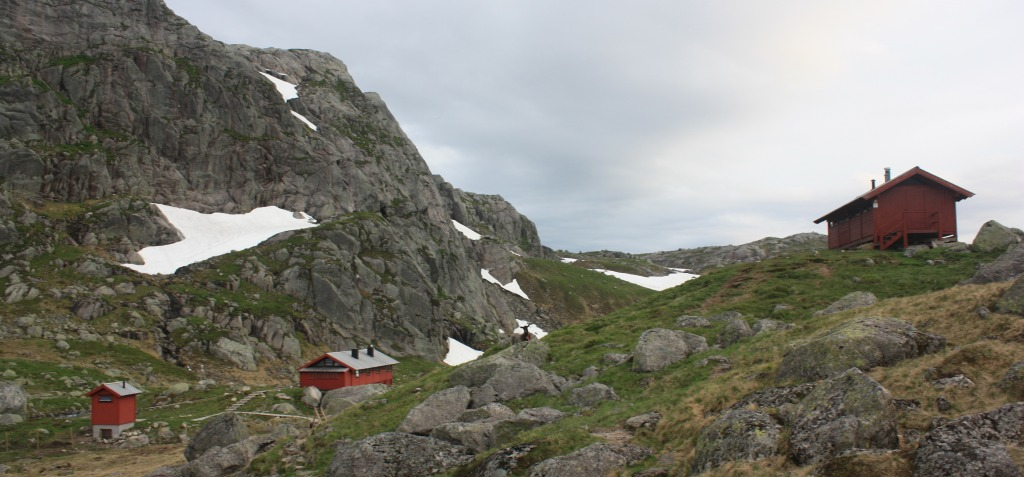
Langavatn cabins [58.992, 6.614]

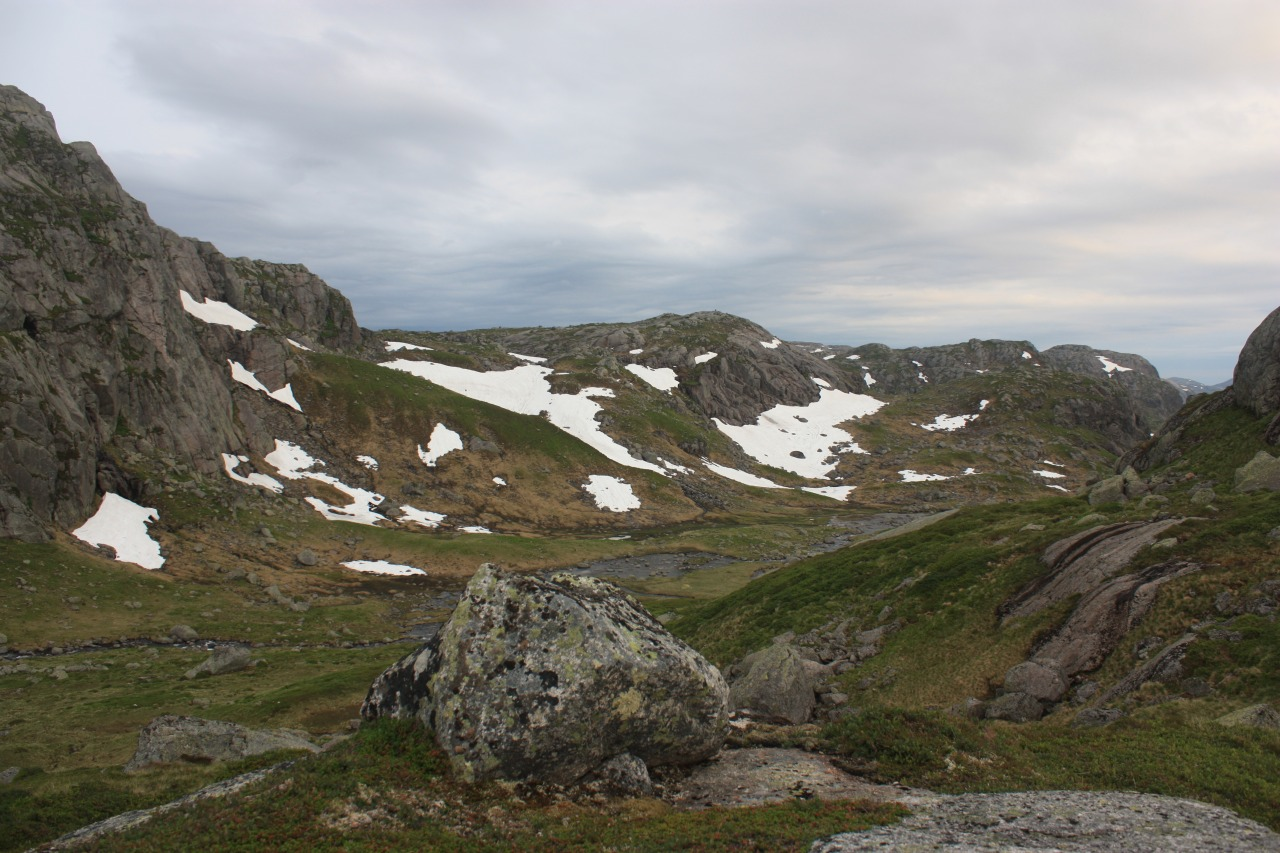
Kjerag view from Langavatn

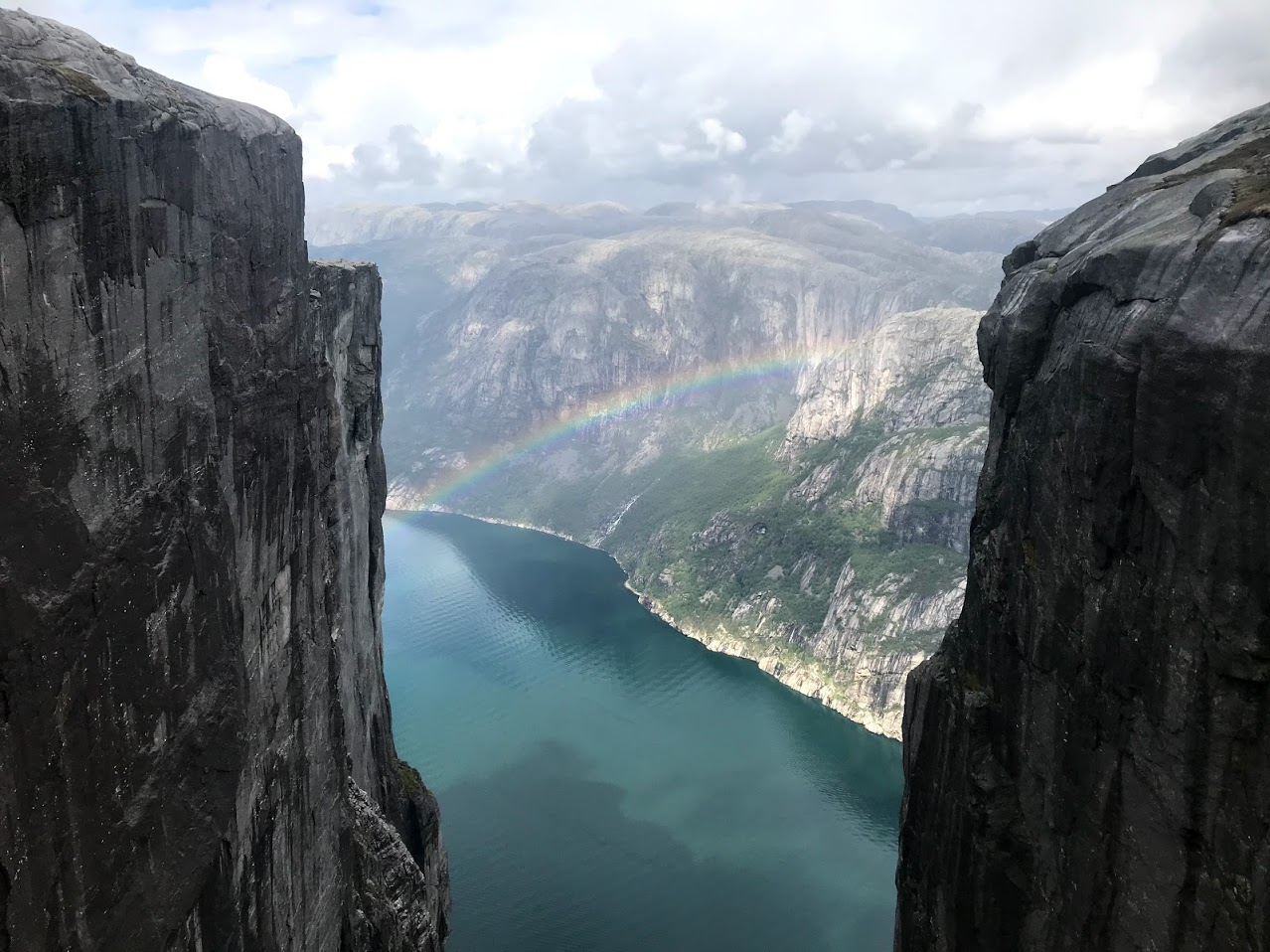
View of Lysefjorden from Kjeragbolten

== See also ==
- Kjeragbolten
- Preikestolen
