= Lies, North Brabant =

Lies Lies
- Hamlet
- Location within North Brabant
- Coordinates: 51°34′N 4°42′E
- Country: The Netherlands
- Province: North Brabant

Population
  - Total: 770

Lies is a hamlet in the Dutch province of North Brabant. It is located in the municipality of Breda, about 5 km southwest of the city centre.
