= Eugene Lies =

American politician

Eugene Lies served as a member of the 1859-1860 California State Assembly, representing the 2nd District.
