= Lyse Richer =

Canadian administrator and music teacher

- Born: September 11, 1939 (age 86); Montreal, Quebec, Canada
- Education: École de musique Vincent-d'Indy
- Alma mater: Université de Montréal
- Occupations: Administrator; Music teacher
- Children: 3

Lyse Richer (born September 11, 1939) is a Canadian administrator and teacher of music. She taught piano at both the École de musique Vincent-d'Indy and the Université de Montréal. Richer later took on administrative roles in the management of several Quebec dance and theatre companies in the 1970s and the 1980s. She gave lectures and papers and conferences and was the authors of multiple entries on Canadian composers.

== Early life and education ==
On 11 September 1939, Richer was born in Montreal. She is the daughter of a chartered accountant and musician. Richer studied music as well as excelling at math in her childhood. She chose music as her main passion prior to studying at university after her mother had guided her to it. From 1951 to 1961, Richer studied piano with Yvonne Hubert and composition with Claude Champagne at the École de musique Vincent-d'Indy, earning a Master of Music degree in piano. She graduated with a Bachelor of Arts degree at the Université de Montréal in 1958, and earned a Bachelor of Music degree from the same university in 1960. Between 1965 and 1970, Richer studied composition with Serge Garant and musicology with Maryvonne Kendergi at the Université de Montréal.

== Career ==
From 1956 to 1963, she taught piano at the École de musique Vincent-d'Indy, and the same subject at the Faculty of Music of the Université de Montréal between 1966 and 1976, where she led the graduate studies in musicology in the Canadian music history section. Richer was given bursaries from the Government of Quebec lasting from 1968 to 1978 and from the Canada Council between 1974 and 1975. She prepared Wilfrid Pelletier's inventory collection for possible acquisition by the BN du Q in 1971. That same year, Richer was appointed Canada's computerized processing of data on music called MUSCADET's (now MUSCADØC) administrative director. She was Montreal Canadian Music Centre's vice-president from 1977 to 1979. Richer was a cultural journalist, researcher and producer of the Canadian Broadcasting Corporation's French-language Radio and Television broadcast series between 1978 and 1982.

From 1980 to 1982, she served as director general of the small dance company Le Groupe Nouvelle Aire, and was given the responsibility of the Festival d'été de Québec's 1982 music, street and theatre program after moving to Quebec City earlier that year. Richer was director of the Cahiers du Québec's music collection from 1984 to 1986. Between 1982 and 1986, she was director general and secretary and later as special advisor from 1988 to 1989 to the Seil des arts de la Communauté urbaine de Montréal's board of directors. Richer was general director of arts and policy planning in Communications Canada's cultural affairs department between 1986 and 1988. In 1989, the project management, planning, development and performing arts management company Les Productions Tintam'Art Inc was established by Richer and her associate, Jeannette Laquerre.

She gave lectures and papers at conferences and wrote several entries on Canadian composers in the Contemporary Canadian Composers, Dictionary of Contemporary Music, Le Musicien éducateur, EMC, and The New Grove. Richer was a contributor to the 1990 CD sound documentary RCI Anthology of Canadian Music's program notes. In 1987, she was viewed by the press as a potential candidate for director general of the National Arts Centre in Ottawa. Richer had moved to France and was working as theatre director of the Chêne Noir by 1992.

== Awards ==
In 1958, she won a prize of the Ladies' Morning Musical Club's Matinées symphoniques and another at the Ottawa Music Festival the following year.

== Personal life ==
Richer is divorced with three children.
