= White lie (disambiguation) =

A white lie is a minor lie which could be considered harmless, or even beneficial, in the long term.

White lie(s) may also refer to:

== Film and television ==
=== Film ===
- Safed Jhooth (lit. 'White Lie'), 1979 Indian film
- White Lie (film), a Canadian drama film
- White Lies (1920 film), an American film directed by Edward LeSaint
- White Lies (1935 film), an American film starring Walter Connolly and Fay Wray
- White Lies, translation of Vita lögner, a 1995 Danish-Finnish-Swedish film directed by Mats Arehn
- White Lies (1996 film), a film directed by Ken Selden
- White Lies (1998 Canadian film), a film starring Lynn Redgrave
- White Lies (1998 French film), a film starring Marie Trintignant
- White Lies (2013 film), a New Zealand film
- White Lies (2014 film), an Indian film that was retitled Tigers

=== TV ===
- White Lie (TV series), a 2008–2009 South Korean drama series (sometimes referred to as White Lies)
- White Lies (miniseries), a 2024 South African TV series
- "White Lies" (Atlantis), a 2013 episode

== Music ==
- White Lies (band), an English post-punk band
- White Lies (Deine Lakaien album), 2002
- White Lies (LoveHateHero album), 2007, or its title song
- White Lies (Mick Flannery album), 2008
- "White Lies" (Jason & the Scorchers song)
- "White Lies" (M-22 song), 2019
- "White Lies" (Mr Hudson song), 2009
- "White Lies" (Paul van Dyk song), 2007
- "White Lies" (VIZE x Tokio Hotel song), 2021
- "White Lies", a song by Max Frost
- "White Lies", a song by Girls Aloud from Sound of the Underground
- "White Lies", a song by Grin from 1+1
- "White Lies", a song by Man Overboard from Heart Attack
- "White Lies", a song by the Saturdays from On Your Radar
- "White Lies", a song by Stereophonics from Keep the Village Alive

== Other uses ==
- White Lies (play) or The White Liars, a 1967 play by Peter Shaffer
- White Lies (for My Mother), a 1992 non-fiction book by Liza Potvin

== See also ==
- Little White Lies (disambiguation)
- "White Liar", a 2009 song by Miranda Lambert
