= Sam Childers =

American author

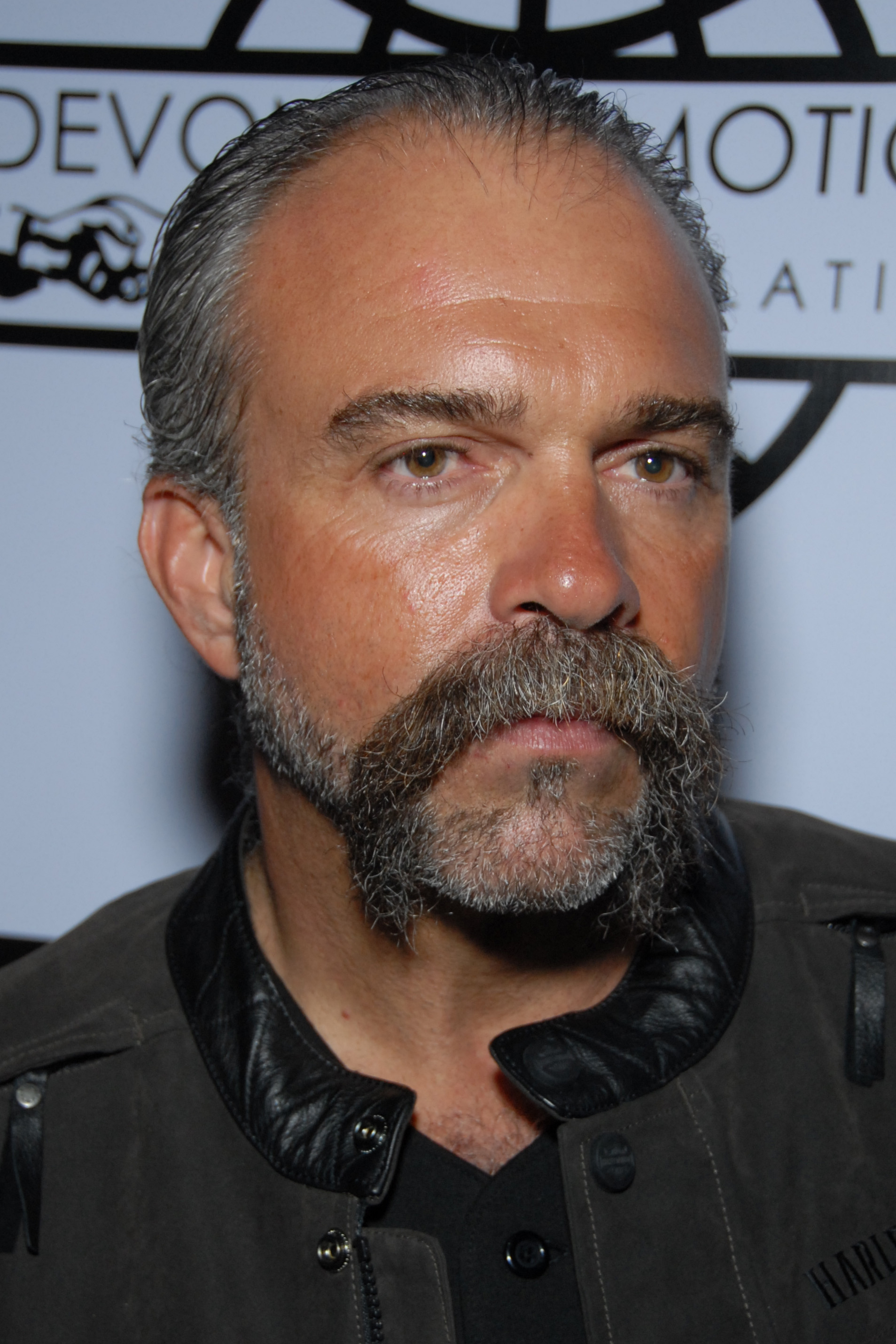
- Childers arriving at a book signing of Another Man's War
- Born: 1963 (age 62–63); Grand Forks, North Dakota, United States
- Children: 2
- Writing career
- Notable work: Another Man's War
- Notable awards: Mother Teresa Awards

Sam Childers (born 1963), also known as the Machine Gun Preacher, is an American motorcyclist, author, and Christian missionary. A member of the Highwaymen Motorcycle Club, Childers became well known after Dateline NBC broadcast a profile of him by Keith Morrison and Tim Sandler that documented his interactions with Joseph Kony, the leader of the Lord's Resistance Army in 2005. Childers subsequently decided to work with orphaned children in the war zone of South Sudan. Childers and his wife Lynn founded and operate Angels of East Africa, the Children's Village Orphanage in Nimule, South Sudan, where they currently have around 185 children in their care. Childers also has orphanages and homes in Uganda and Ethiopia with another 160 children in his organisation's care.

In 2013, Childers received the Mother Teresa Award for Social Justice.

== Early life ==
Childers was born in Grand Forks, North Dakota, the son of Paul Childers, an ironworker and former Marine.

In the spring of 1974, shortly before Childers turned 12, his family moved to Grand Rapids, Minnesota. By the eighth grade, he was using LSD and amphetamines, he also discovered cigarettes, marijuana, alcohol and heroin. This led to many years of drug addiction, drug dealing, and alcoholism. Childers also developed a love for motorcycles and the lifestyle that led him to become a member of the Highwaymen Motorcycle Club.

== Career ==
Childers converted to Christianity in mid-1992, with the help of his first wife, during a revival meeting at an Assembly of God church. That same evening Childers' pastor allegedly prophesied that he would go to Africa. In 1998, Childers made his first trip to Sudan. In that first trip and the many that followed, he was exposed to the acts of the Lord's Resistance Army (LRA), which he described as atrocious. He had a longstanding mission to find the leader of the LRA, Joseph Kony, and kill him.

Not long after his first trip to Sudan, Childers and his then wife Lynn founded the Angels of East Africa, the Children's Village in Southern Sudan. The Children’s Village currently houses and educates over 180 orphans, with over a thousand children rescued since its conception. The staff at the Children's Village are primarily Sudanese orphans and widows themselves.

Childers details the events of his life and his experiences in Africa in his book Another Man's War. The book bears the endorsement from South Sudan President Salva Kiir: "The Reverend Sam Childers has been a very close friend to the government of South Sudan for many years and is a trusted friend."

== In popular culture ==
In 2011, Relativity Media released a biopic about Childers entitled Machine Gun Preacher, which was based on Childers' book Another Man's War. The film was written by Jason Keller and directed by Marc Forster. The cast featured Gerard Butler in the title role, Michelle Monaghan as Childers' wife Lynn, and Michael Shannon as his best friend Donnie.

In 2014, a documentary with the same title was produced by Angels of East Africa, and filmed/edited by Australians Kevin Evans and Zac Simpson. It was released globally by Heritage Films in Australia and in North America by Vision Films (US).

Childers did a speaking tour of UK churches, organisations, businesses, rehab centers, and prisons in 2018. He was interviewed on video in Tamworth, UK.

== Criticisms ==
Childers has faced criticism over his actions and representation of himself. Foreign Policy cast doubt on Childers' stories of rescue, stating that "[i]t would take a miracle for all of Childers’s claims to be completely true." It also asserted that the operations of other aid workers are imperiled by Childers' actions. Additionally, the SPLA distanced itself from Childers, stating via a spokesman that "The SPLA does not know Sam Childers."

In 2014, Childers' home and ministry properties were the subjects of a raid by the FBI and the IRS.

Other criticism includes allegations that orphanages started by Childers have been poorly run, and that Childers has not made a visit in years. A Vanity Fair profile compared Childers' demeanor toward some villagers as "bullying."
