= Lysebotn =

Village in Sandnes Municipality, Norway

- Village
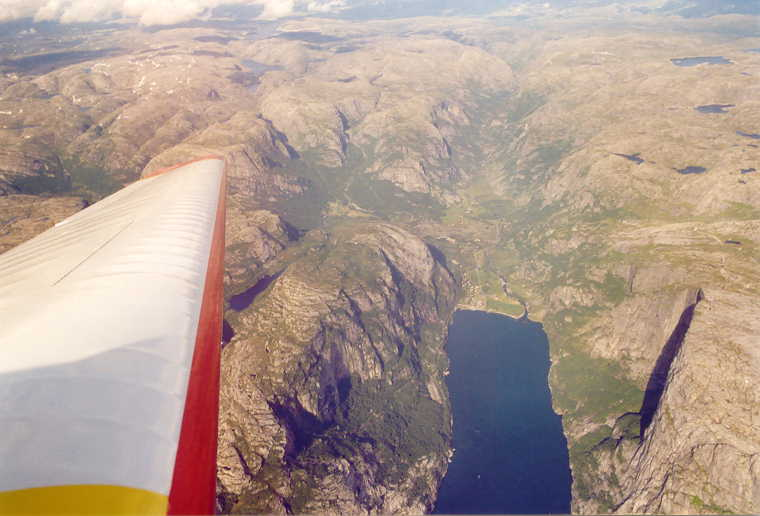
- View of the village and Lysefjorden (aerial view)
- Interactive map of Lysebotn
- Coordinates: 59.0554°N 6.64853°E
- Country: Norway
- Region: Western Norway
- County: Rogaland
- District: Ryfylke
- Municipality: Sandnes Municipality
- Elevation: 5 m (16 ft)

Population (2017)
  - Total: 13
- Time zone: UTC+01:00 (CET)
  - Summer (DST): UTC+02:00 (CEST)
- Post Code: 4127 Lysebotn

Lysebotn is a village in Sandnes Municipality in Rogaland county, Norway. The village is located at the eastern end of the Lysefjorden in a very isolated valley that is only accessible by a seasonal road or by boat. The name itself means the "bottom [end] of the Lysefjorden". It's a destination for over 100,000 tourists annually, and it is an access point for the Kjerag mountain, a popular Base Jumping spot. There are cruises and an express boat to Lysebotn from Skagenkaien in the city of Stavanger, Lauvvik (in Høle), and the village of Forsand. All of which pass beneath the famous Preikestolen cliff on the way to Lysebotn. Lyse Chapel, built in 1961, is found at Lysebotn. Lysebotn at one time had its own school, but that is now closed.

== Economy ==
Lysebotn is largely populated by workers at the nearby Lysebotn Hydroelectric Power Station and Tjodan Hydroelectric Power Station, both of which are built inside the surrounding mountains. At the Lysefjord plant, the water falls 620 metres (2,030 ft) to the turbines, producing up to 210,000 kilowatts (280,000 hp) of electricity. At Tjodan, the water falls 896 metres (2,940 ft) to yield an output of 110,000 kilowatts (150,000 hp). The two power plants provide electricity for more than 100,000 people.

Lysebotn today has its own campground, bed & breakfast, and tourist cabins. Guided kayak tours and other activity offerings are available during the summer. There are also trailheads near Lysebotn for access to the Lyseheiane back-country, and a huge flume for Lyse Power nearby, that generates hydroelectricity.

== Transportation ==
The only way in to Lysebotn is by boat or by the spectacular Lysebotnvegen (Lysebotn road), officially known as Lyseveien (Bokmål) and Lysevegen (Nynorsk), which connects it to the nearby Sirdal Municipality in Agder county. The 29-kilometre (18 mi) long road rises over 900 metres (3,000 ft) up a very steep cliff, going through 27 hairpin turns, including one hairpin turn inside a 1,103-metre (3,619 ft) long tunnel that goes inside the mountain. The road was opened in 1984 and it is open only in the summer, when it is ice free and safe. The road has its highest point at 932 metres (3,058 ft) above sea level. At the top of the turns is Øygardstølen which has a parking lot, food service, and a service building for hiking trips to the nearby Kjerag mountain, Kjeragbolten boulder, and Kjeragfossen waterfall.

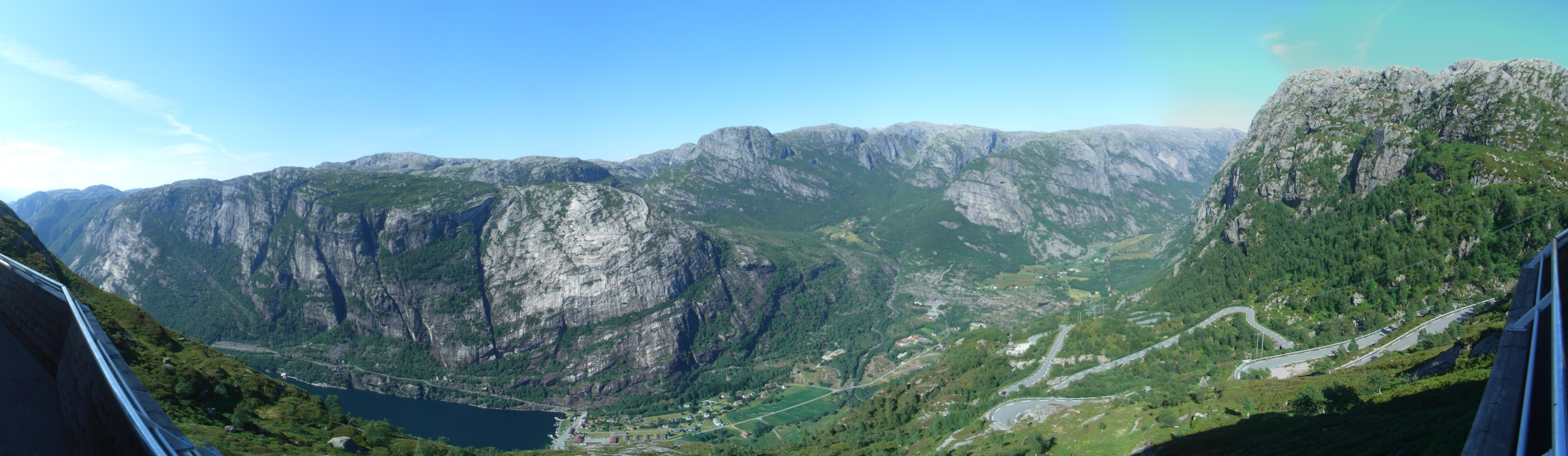
Lysebotn seen from Øygardstøl (full view)

== Climate ==
Climate data for Lysebotn (345 m, Precipitation 1895-, extremes 2012-)
Month	Jan	Feb	Mar	Apr	May	Jun	Jul	Aug	Sep	Oct	Nov	Dec	Year
Record high °C (°F)	13.6 (56.5)	13.1 (55.6)	15.5 (59.9)	20.6 (69.1)	31.1 (88.0)	30.2 (86.4)	34.2 (93.6)	30.3 (86.5)	28.6 (83.5)	19.2 (66.6)	17.2 (63.0)	12.9 (55.2)	34.2 (93.6)
Daily mean °C (°F)	2.1 (35.8)	1.7 (35.1)	3.2 (37.8)	7.2 (45.0)	10.6 (51.1)	13.5 (56.3)	15.6 (60.1)	15.7 (60.3)	12.6 (54.7)	8.5 (47.3)	5.5 (41.9)	2.6 (36.7)	8.2 (46.8)
Record low °C (°F)	−10.1 (13.8)	−11.7 (10.9)	−10.4 (13.3)	−3.2 (26.2)	−0.6 (30.9)	3.8 (38.8)	6.4 (43.5)	5.9 (42.6)	2.3 (36.1)	−3.0 (26.6)	−6.8 (19.8)	−10.2 (13.6)	−11.7 (10.9)
Average precipitation mm (inches)	266 (10.5)	228 (9.0)	184 (7.2)	108 (4.3)	94 (3.7)	102 (4.0)	123 (4.8)	164 (6.5)	198 (7.8)	237 (9.3)	250 (9.8)	286 (11.3)	2,240 (88.2)
