= Lies, Friesland =

Village in Friesland,Netherlands

Lies
- Village
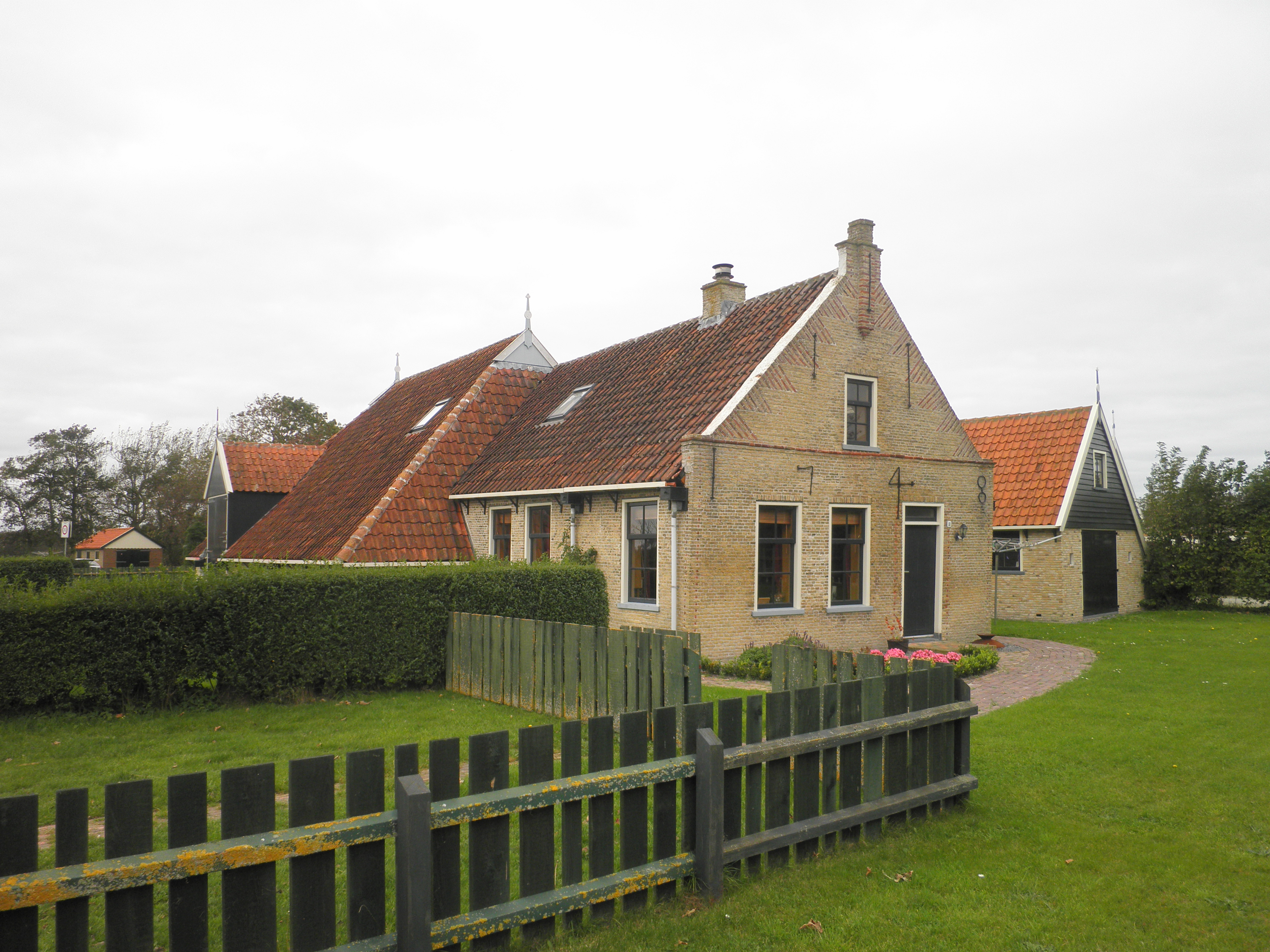
- Farmhouse in Lies

- Location of Lies on Terschelling

- Location in the Netherlands
- Country: Netherlands
- Province: Friesland
- Municipality: Terschelling

Population (1 January 2017)
  - Total: 145
- Time zone: UTC+1 (CET)
  - Summer (DST): UTC+2 (CEST)
- Postal code: 8895
- Dialing code: 0562

Lies is a small village in the north of the Netherlands, on the Wadden Sea island of Terschelling, Friesland. It had a population of around 145 in January 2017.

== Sources ==
- Municipality guide Terschelling 2005-2006
