= Machine Gun Preacher =

- Theatrical release poster
- Directed by: Marc Forster
- Screenplay by: Jason Keller
- Based on: Another Man's War by Sam Childers
- Produced by: Robbie Brenner; Gary Safady; Deborah Giarratana; Craig Chapman; Mark Forster
- Starring: Gerard Butler; Michelle Monaghan; Michael Shannon
- Cinematography: Roberto Schaefer
- Edited by: Matt Chessé
- Music by: Asche & Spencer
- Production companies: Apparatus; Safady Entertainment; 1984 Private Defense Contractors; Mpower Pictures; Virgin Produced
- Distributed by: Relativity Media (North America); Lionsgate (International)
- Release dates: September 11, 2011 (TIFF); September 23, 2011 (United States)
- Running time: 129 minutes
- Country: United States
- Language: English
- Budget: $30 million
- Box office: $3.3 million

Machine Gun Preacher is a 2011 American biographical action drama film directed by Marc Forster and starring Gerard Butler, Michelle Monaghan, and Michael Shannon. It tells the story of Sam Childers, a former gang biker turned preacher, and his efforts to protect, in collaboration with the Sudan People's Liberation Army (SPLA), the children of South Sudan from the atrocities of Joseph Kony's Lord's Resistance Army (LRA). The screenplay by Jason Keller was adapted from Childers' book Another Man's War and Ian Urbina's Vanity Fair article "Get Kony".

The film premiered at the 2011 Toronto International Film Festival and opened in the United States on September 23, 2011.

== Plot ==
In 2003 in southern Sudan, the LRA attacks a village and forces a young boy to kill his mother.

A few years earlier, Sam Childers, an alcoholic drug-using biker from Pennsylvania, is released from prison and finds that his wife, Lynn, has given up her job as a stripper after accepting Christ as her savior. Dumbfounded by her decision, he returns to a life of crime and partying and doing heroin with his friend Donnie, and one night he almost kills a vagrant. Shaken by the experience, Sam goes to church with Lynn, where he is baptized and offered salvation.

With a new outlook on life, Sam is able to find a stable job as a construction worker and later starts his own company. He helps Donnie get sober and goes on a missionary trip to Uganda to build homes for refugees. While there, he asks Deng, one of the SPLA soldiers watching over his group, to take him north to see Sudan, despite Deng warning him that it is a war zone. In a medical tent, Sam is asked by a female doctor to help move a woman who has just had her lips cut off by Joseph Kony's LRA rebels. That night, Sam witnesses the large numbers of children who come from their villages to sleep outdoors on the ground at the displaced persons camp because it is safer than staying at home, and Sam brings as many as will fit into his and Deng's room to sleep. The next day, Deng takes Sam to a village that was attacked by the LRA, and Sam sees a child get killed by a land mine.

Traumatized and changed by the trip, Sam receives a vision from God that tells him to build both a church in his own neighborhood, which will not turn anyone away, and an orphanage in southern Sudan. He begins preaching at the church once it is built and then returns to Africa to build the orphanage. During construction, the LRA attack, destroying everything. Sam calls Lynn to tell her what happened and that he is giving up, but she says it is a test from God and he should start building again. After the orphanage is complete, a young girl brought there dies of her injuries, prompting Sam to start to lead armed raids to rescue children, including child soldiers, from the LRA.

At home, Sam becomes increasingly unempathetic toward his family and their petty problems, his sermons become angrier, and his sole focus becomes raising money to fund his work in Africa. In Sudan, he starts to make an impact, with Kony putting a price on his head and SPLA-leader John Garang inviting him to upcoming peace talks, though Sam does not attend. One night, he and some SPLA soldiers are attacked on the road by the LRA. After chasing off the attackers, they search the area and discover a large group of children hiding in a ditch. They cannot take all of the children to the orphanage in one trip, and when they return for the children they left behind, they find a pile of burned bodies. Events such as this, along with Donnie's death from an overdose after Sam yelled at him and he broke his sobriety, push Sam away from God and further into despair. He sells his construction company and goes back to Sudan, but his changed attitude leads his men to no longer trust him to lead them in battle.

William, the boy who was forced to kill his mother at the start of the film and subsequently ended up at the orphanage, tells Sam his story and reminds Sam that their fight is already lost if they become full of hate. His faith and purpose revitalized, Sam begins to play with the children at the orphanage and calls his daughter to say he loves her. Later, he goes out with some SPLA soldiers and rescues a caravan of children kidnapped by the LRA. There is again not enough space to take everyone to the orphanage in one trip, but this time Sam and a few soldiers stay to protect the remaining children.

== Cast ==
- Gerard Butler as Sam Childers
- Michelle Monaghan as Lynn Childers
- Kathy Baker as Daisy
- Michael Shannon as Donnie
- Ryann Campos as Paige #1 (younger)
- Madeline Carroll as Paige #2 (older)
- Souléymane Sy Savané as Deng
- Grant R. Krause as Billy/Contractor
- Reavis Graham as Pastor Krause
- Peter Carey as Bill Wallace
- Steve Blackwood as Bank Manager
- Rhema Marvanne (credited as Rhema Voraritskul) as Child Singer
- Mduduzi Mabaso as Marco
- Fana Mokoena as John Garang
- Junior Magale as William
- Jessica Joffe as Agnete Closson
- Abena Ayivor as Betty

== Production and release ==
Filming commenced in June 2010 in Michigan.

The film had a gala premiere at the Toronto International Film Festival on September 11, 2011, and a limited theatrical release on September 23, 2011. Sam Childers has shown a shortened and edited version of the film at Christian charity events.

== Soundtrack ==
Chris Cornell wrote the song "The Keeper" for the film, which he performed on the Late Show with David Letterman and Jimmy Kimmel Live! to promote it.

== Reception ==
On review aggregator website Rotten Tomatoes, the film has an approval rating of 28% based on 116 reviews, with an average rating of 4.8 out of 10; the site's critics consensus reads: "There's a complex man at the center of Machine Gun Preacher but the movie is too shapeless and emotionally vacant to bring his story to life." On Metacritic, the film has a weighted average score of 43 out of 100 based on 32 reviews, indicating "mixed or average reviews".

Globally, Machine Gun Preacher made $3 million at the box office, a mere 1/10 of its $30 million budget.

== See also ==
- In a Better World (2010 film)
