= Lysebotn Hydroelectric Power Station =

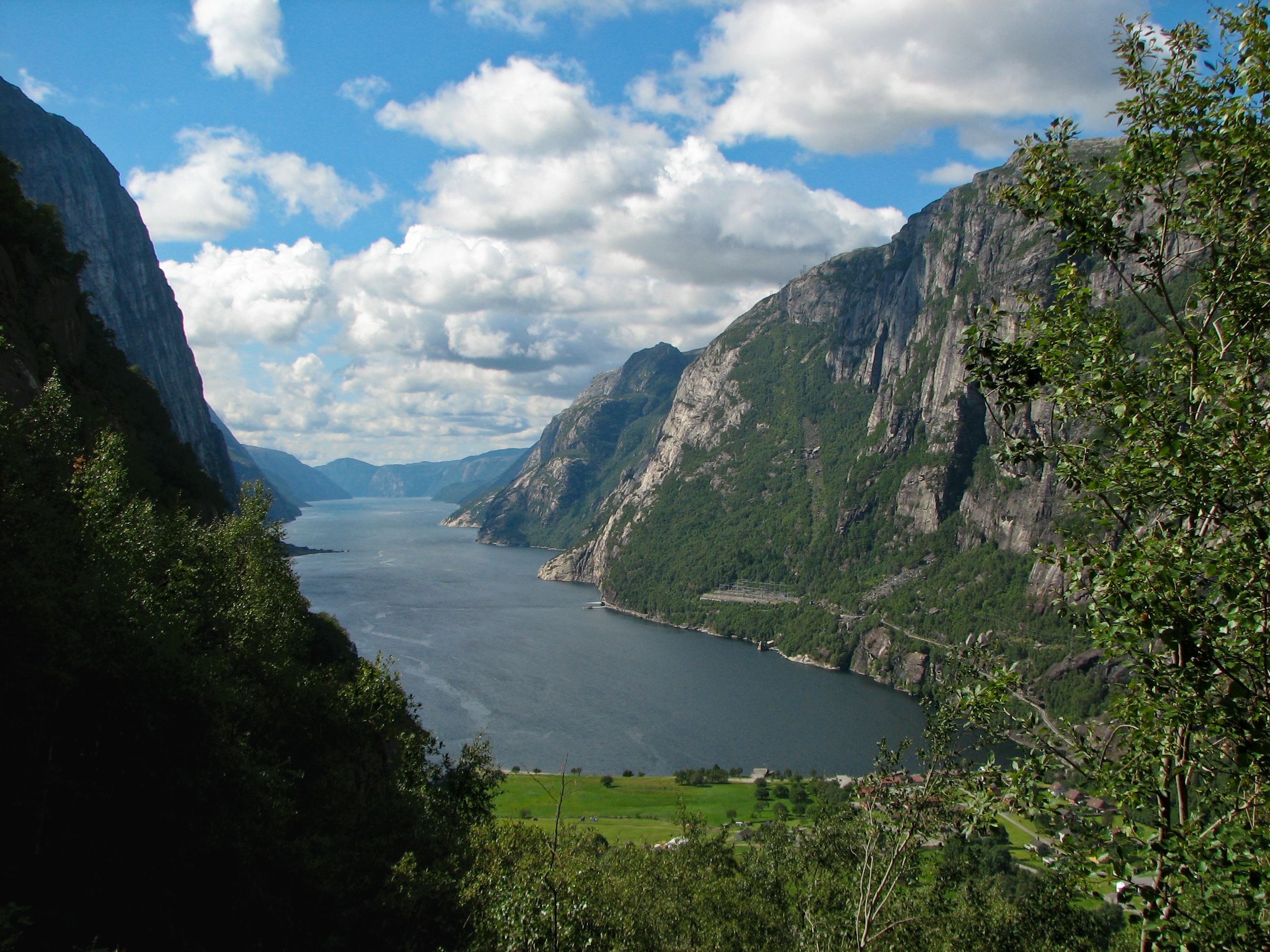
- Lysefjorden seen from Lysebotn
- Official name: Lysebotn kraftverk
- Country: Norway
- Location: Sandnes
- Coordinates: 59°03′15″N 6°37′36″E
- Status: Operational
- Opening date: 1953; 72 years ago

Reservoir
- Total capacity: 595×10^{6} m^{3} (0.595 km^{3})

Power Station
- Installed capacity: 210 MW
- Capacity factor: 67.6%
- Annual generation: 1,242 GW·h

The Lysebotn Power Station is a hydroelectric power station located in the municipality Sandnes in Rogaland, Norway. The facility operates at an installed capacity of 210 MW. The average annual production is 1,242 GWh. It has produced 63 TWh since it started in 1953.

External image
- Drawing of Lysebotn II

A new NOK 1.8 billion powerplant called Lysebotn II with 370 MW Francis turbines was built nearby, with an expected life of 60–70 years. The tunnels are 7.8 km long, 45 m^{2} wide, and transporting 60 m^{3}/second. It officially opened on the 17th of September 2018.

The reservoir has a capacity of 595×10^{6} m^{3} (0.595 km^{3}) water located at 636–686 m altitude.

== See also ==
- Flørli Hydroelectric Power Station
