= Gerard Butler =

Scottish actor and film producer (born 1969)

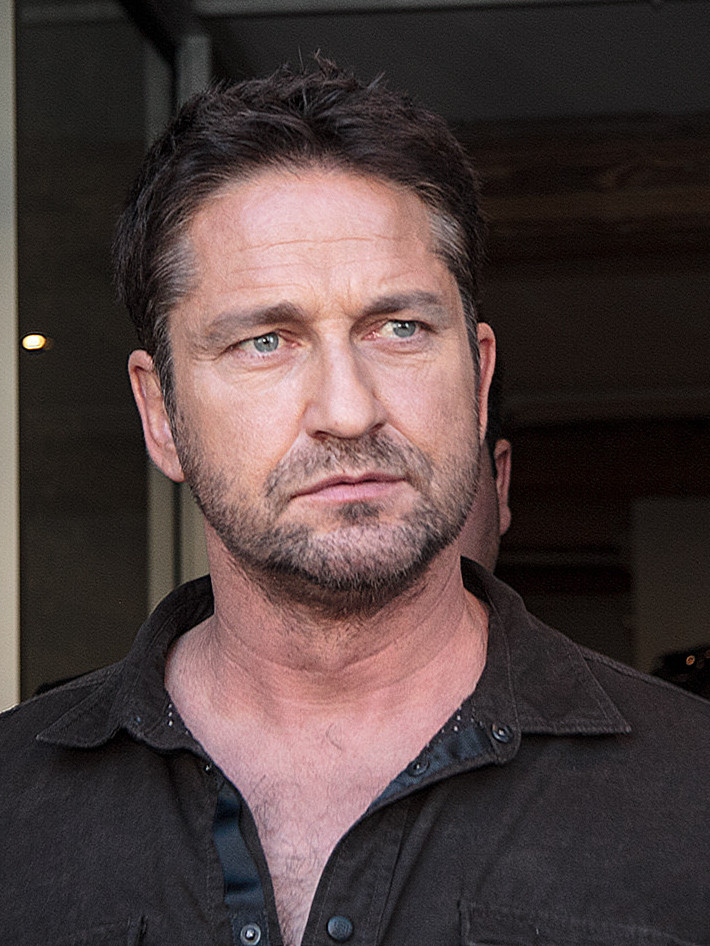
- Butler in 2016
- Born: Gerard James Butler; 13 November 1969 (age 57); Paisley, Renfrewshire, Scotland
- Education: University of Glasgow; Royal Conservatoire of Scotland
- Occupations: Actor; film producer
- Years active: 1992–present
- Works: Full list

Gerard James Butler (born 13 November 1969) is a Scottish actor and film producer. After studying law, he turned to acting in the mid-1990s with small roles in productions such as Mrs Brown (1997), the James Bond film Tomorrow Never Dies (1997), and Tale of the Mummy (1998). In 2000, he starred as Count Dracula in the gothic horror film Dracula 2000. He played Attila the Hun in the miniseries Attila (2001), then appeared in the films Reign of Fire (2002) and Lara Croft: Tomb Raider – The Cradle of Life (2003) before starring in the science fiction film Timeline (2003). He played Erik, The Phantom in Joel Schumacher's 2004 movie musical The Phantom of the Opera.

Butler gained wider recognition for his portrayal of King Leonidas in Zack Snyder's fantasy war film 300 (2006). In 2010, he began lending his voice to the How to Train Your Dragon franchise. Also in the 2010s, he portrayed Secret Service agent Mike Banning in the action thriller Has Fallen film series, played military leader Tullus Aufidius in the 2011 film Coriolanus, and portrayed Sam Childers in the 2011 action biopic Machine Gun Preacher. Butler had further action film roles in Geostorm (2017), Den of Thieves (2018), Greenland (2020), Copshop (2021), Last Seen Alive (2022), Plane and Kandahar (both in 2023).

== Early life ==
Gerard James Butler was born in Paisley, Scotland, on 13 November 1969, the youngest of three children of Margaret and Edward Butler, a bookmaker. His family, which is Catholic, is of Irish descent. His family moved to Montreal, Quebec, Canada, when he was six months old. A year later, when his parents' marriage broke down, his mother left Montreal and returned to Scotland with Butler.

Butler was head boy at St Mirin's & St Margaret's High School in Paisley and won a place at University of Glasgow School of Law. He also attended Scottish Youth Theatre while a teenager. He did not see his father again until he was 16, when Edward called to meet him at a Glasgow restaurant. After the meeting, Butler cried for hours, and recalled later: "That emotion showed me how much pain can sit in this body of yours; pain and sorrow that you don't know you have until it is unleashed."

As a student, he was the president of the university law society, a position of which he later said he "kind of blagged my way into". When Butler was 22, his father was diagnosed with cancer and died. He said of this period in his life: "I had gone from a 16-year-old who couldn't wait to grasp life to a 22-year-old who didn't care if he died in his sleep."

Before his final year of law school, Butler took a year off to live in California—mostly in Venice Beach, where he held different jobs, travelled often, and, he says, drank heavily; at one point he was arrested for alcohol-related disorderly conduct. Describing his behaviour during that year, he recalled: "I was out of control, and justifying it with this idea that 'I'm young, this is life. This is me just being boisterous.' " After his time off in America, he returned to Scotland to finish his final year at law school.

He had ear surgery as a child that left him with a mangled ear. He still suffers from tinnitus and has hearing loss in his right ear.

== Career ==
=== Legal career and early acting career ===
Upon graduation, he took a position as a trainee lawyer at an Edinburgh law firm. However, he continued to stay out late drinking and frequently missed work. One week before he qualified as a lawyer, he was fired. At the age of 25, and an unqualified lawyer, he moved to London to pursue his dream of becoming famous. He admitted, "When I started out, I'm not sure I was actually in it for the right reasons. I wanted very much to be famous."

Initially unable to win any acting roles, he worked in a variety of jobs including as a waiter, a telemarketer and a toy demonstrator at fairs. In London, he met an old friend from his teenage days in the Scottish Youth Theatre, who was now a London casting director. At that time, he was her boyfriend and her assistant. She took him to an audition for Steven Berkoff's play of Coriolanus. The director said of Butler's audition, "When he read, he had such vigour and enthusiasm—so much that it made the other actors seem limp—that I decided to cast him in the ensemble."

Then aged 27, Butler had his first professional acting job. Less than a year later, he won a part in a theatre adaptation of the book Trainspotting at the Edinburgh Festival. At age 30, he moved to Los Angeles, where he had parts in Dracula 2000, Lara Croft: Tomb Raider – The Cradle of Life, and The Phantom of the Opera.

=== Acting career ===
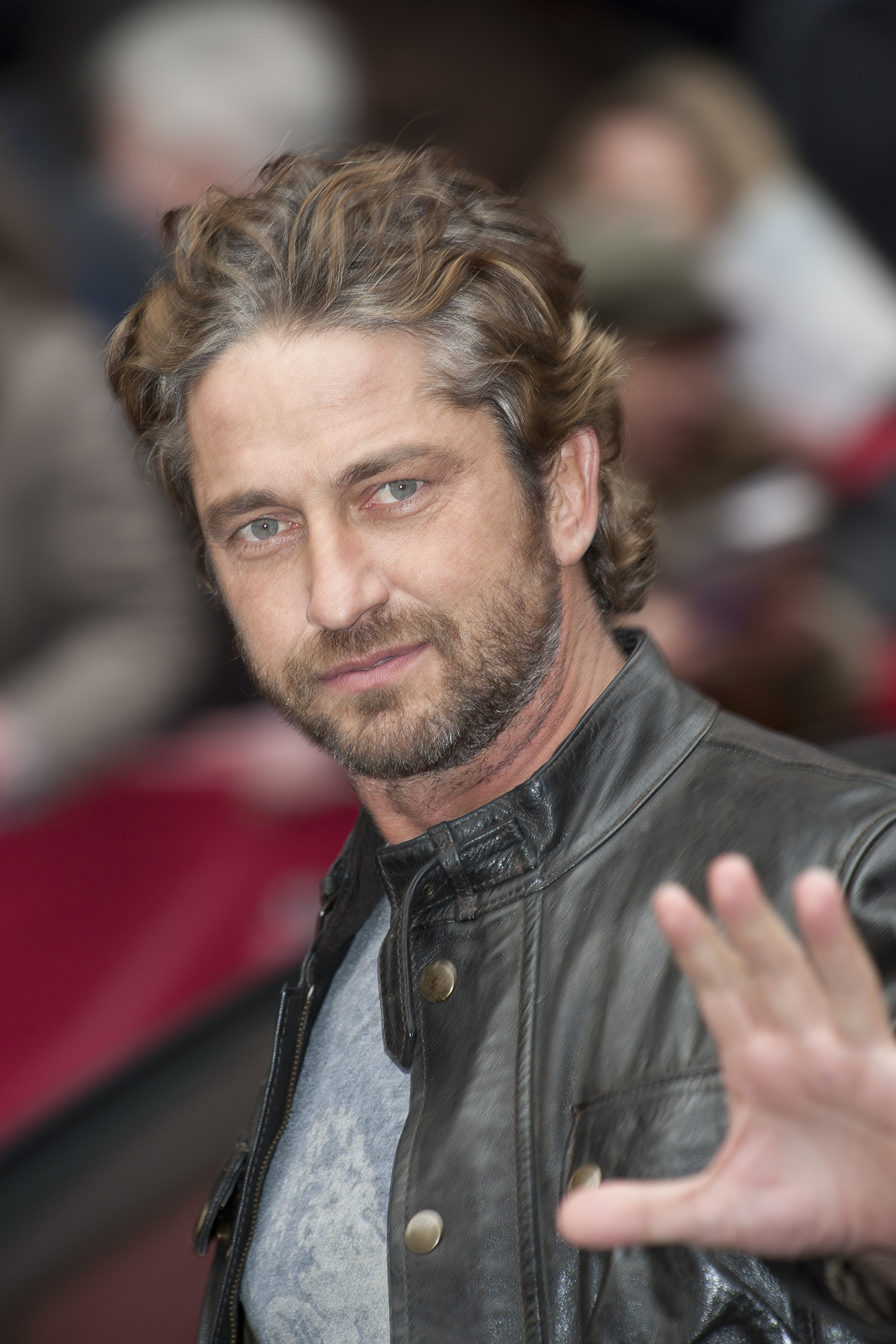
Butler at the 2011 Berlin Film Festival

In London, Butler had various odd jobs until being cast by actor and director Berkoff (who later appeared alongside him in the American TV miniseries Attila) in a stage production of Coriolanus. He was cast as Ewan McGregor's character Renton in the stage adaptation of Trainspotting, the same play that had inspired him to become an actor. His film debut was as Billy Connolly's character's younger brother in Mrs Brown (1997).

His film career continued with small roles, first in the James Bond film Tomorrow Never Dies (1997) and then Russell Mulcahy's Tale of the Mummy (1998). In 2000, Butler was cast in two breakthrough roles, the first being Attila the Hun in Attila. The film's producers wanted a known actor to play the part but eventually chose Butler. He was also cast as Count Dracula in Dracula 2000. He then appeared in Reign of Fire (2002) as Creedy (alongside Matthew McConaughey and Christian Bale), Lara Croft: Tomb Raider – The Cradle of Life (2003) as Terry Sheridan (alongside Angelina Jolie), and the big-screen adaptation of Michael Crichton's novel Timeline (2003) as André Marek (alongside Paul Walker).

In 2003, director Joel Schumacher was deciding on the principal casting for the film The Phantom of the Opera, a film adaptation of the Andrew Lloyd Webber musical of the same name, and thought of Butler, whom he had seen earlier in the film Dracula 2000, to play the title character. Butler, who had had no musical experience other than singing in a rock band while he was studying to be a lawyer, was surprised at the interest, but immediately began taking singing lessons with a vocal coach. He then did an acting audition with Schumacher, and a singing audition with Webber, both of whom were impressed by his performance. The film, and Butler's performance, received mixed reviews, though Butler was nominated for Satellite Award for Best Actor in a Motion Picture – Comedy or Musical. Other projects that followed include Dear Frankie (2004), The Game of Their Lives and Beowulf & Grendel (both were released in 2005).

In 2006, he starred as Spartan King Leonidas in the Warner Bros. production 300, which is often described as his breakthrough role. Butler, who said he "wanted to look really strong" in the film, trained with a high-intensity workout for four months prior to the film's shooting. In 2007, he appeared in Butterfly on a Wheel co-starring Pierce Brosnan and Maria Bello, and in the romantic film P.S. I Love You with Hilary Swank. In 2008, he appeared in Nim's Island alongside Abigail Breslin and Jodie Foster, and Guy Ritchie film RocknRolla as part of ensemble cast which includes Idris Elba and Tom Hardy. In 2009, he starred in the Neveldine/Taylor film Gamer with Logan Lerman, The Ugly Truth with Katherine Heigl, and Law Abiding Citizen with Jamie Foxx, which he also co-produced. In 2010, he starred in the action/comedy The Bounty Hunter with Jennifer Aniston, and did voice acting for the 2010 animated film How to Train Your Dragon as Stoick the Vast. On 15 and 16 October 2010, thanks to the popularity of his role as Leonidas and the use of his lines during athletic events at Michigan State University, he was a guest at their Midnight Madness and homecoming American football game.

Butler played military leader Tullus Aufidius in the 2011 film Coriolanus opposite Ralph Fiennes, who also directed. A modernized adaptation of William Shakespeare's tragedy of the same name, Butler had already participated in the stage production of Coriolanus in his early career. He also portrayed Sam Childers in the 2011 action biopic film Machine Gun Preacher.

Butler starred as Secret Service agent Mike Banning in the action thriller Olympus Has Fallen (2013), opposite co-stars Aaron Eckhart and Morgan Freeman. He said he broke two bones in his neck while shooting the film, but did not realize this until he had an MRI scan. Butler reprised his voice role as Stoick the Vast in How to Train Your Dragon 2 in 2014. Two years later, he reprised his role as Mike Banning in the Olympus Has Fallen sequel London Has Fallen and also portrayed Set in Gods of Egypt. Later in 2018, Butler starred as submarine captain Commander Joe Glass of the USS Arkansas, a Virginia class nuclear submarine, in the film Hunter Killer alongside Gary Oldman. He starred as Mike Banning again in the 2019 film Angel Has Fallen and returned as the voice of Stoick the Vast in How to Train Your Dragon: The Hidden World, which was released the same year. After release delays due to COVID-19 pandemic, Butler starred in Greenland in 2020. In January 2024, Butler was announced to reprise his role as Stoick the Vast in the live-action remake of How to Train Your Dragon, which was released in 2025.

== Personal life ==
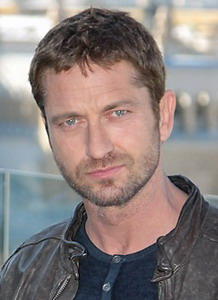
Butler in 2013

Butler has been a member of the Academy of Motion Picture Arts and Sciences in the Actor's Branch since 2011.

As of August 2011, Butler, while filming Playing for Keeps, was writing songs and in the process of recording an album. He disavowed gossip reports that Marilyn Manson and Johnny Depp had advised him on the project.

Since October 2011, Butler has divided his time between Los Angeles and Glasgow. On 18 December that year, while filming Chasing Mavericks, Butler was hospitalized after suffering a surfing incident in Mavericks Beach, where he was pulled under big waves. Subsequently, he was taken to Stanford University Medical Center and later released on that same week.

Butler stated in an interview that he no longer drinks alcohol. In February 2012, it was announced that he had completed a course of treatment for substance abuse of painkillers at a rehabilitation facility. He was concerned he had become too reliant on prescribed pain medication, which escalated after his surfing accident.

In 2011, Butler played in a charity match for Celtic, a football club he has supported since childhood. A year later, he represented Celtic in a Hollywood film, starring as a "has-been" player in Playing for Keeps. He is also a supporter of Scotland rugby team and has even been involved with promotional videos for the side including for the 2023 Rugby World Cup. In August 2013, he bought an equity stake in the Jamaica Tallawahs cricket team, part of the Caribbean Premier League (CPL). He has supported the charity Mary's Meals since 2010. He visited the international development charity's programme in Liberia in 2014. In 2018, he attended a fundraiser gala organised by Friends of the Israel Defense Forces, which raised $60 million.

In November 2018, Butler's home was destroyed in the Woolsey Fire in California.

== Awards and nominations ==
Year	Title	Award	Category	Results	Ref
2004	Dear Frankie	Capri Hollywood International Film Festival	Capri Breakout Actor Award	Won	
2005	The Phantom of the Opera	Online Film & Television Association Award	Best Music, Adapted Song for "The Music of the Night"	Nominated	
2005	The Phantom of the Opera	Satellite Awards	Best Actor in a Motion Picture - Comedy or Musical	Nominated	
2007	300	Golden Schmoes Award	Breakthrough Performance of the Year	Nominated	
2007	300	MTV Movie & TV Awards	Best Male Performance	Nominated	
2007	300	MTV Movie & TV Awards	Best Fight	Won	
2007	—N/a	Taurus World Stunt Awards	Action Movie Star of the Year	Won	
2008	300	Empire Awards	Best Actor	Nominated	
2008	300	Saturn Awards	Best Actor	Nominated	
2010	Law Abiding Citizen	People's Choice Awards	Favorite Action Star	Nominated	
2010	The Ugly Truth	Russian National Movie Awards	Best Foreign Actor	Nominated	
2010	The Bounty Hunter	Teen Choice Awards	Choice Movie Actor – Romantic Comedy	Nominated	
2010	The Ugly Truth	Teen Choice Awards	Choice Movie Actor – Romantic Comedy	Nominated	
2011	How to Train Your Dragon	Annie Awards	Best Voice Acting in an Animated Feature Production	Nominated	
2011	The Bounty Hunter	Golden Raspberry Awards	Worst Actor	Nominated	
2011	The Bounty Hunter	Golden Raspberry Awards	Worst Screen Couple (shared with Jennifer Aniston)	Nominated	
2011	Law Abiding Citizen	Yoga Award	Worst Foreign Actor	Won	
2011	The Bounty Hunter	Yoga Award	Worst Foreign Actor	Won	
2014	—N/a	Russian National Movie Awards	Best Foreign Actor of the Decade	Nominated	
2015	How to Train Your Dragon 2	Behind The Voice Actors Award	Best Vocal Ensemble in a Feature Film	Nominated	
2016	—N/a	Golden Camera Award	Best International Actor	Won	
2017	Gods of Egypt	Golden Raspberry Awards	Worst Actor	Nominated	
2017	London Has Fallen	Golden Raspberry Awards	Worst Actor	Nominated	
