= Has Fallen =

American action film series

- Created by: Creighton Rothenberger; Katrin Benedikt
- Owners: Millennium Films (3 & TV series; co-ownership of the first two films with Universal); Universal Pictures (1-2)
- Years: 2013–present

Films and television
- Films: Olympus Has Fallen (2013); London Has Fallen (2016); Angel Has Fallen (2019)
- Television series: Paris Has Fallen (2024); Apollo Has Fallen (2026)

Has Fallen is an American action thriller film series and media franchise starring Gerard Butler as United States Secret Service agent Mike Banning. The series includes the films Olympus Has Fallen (2013), London Has Fallen (2016), and Angel Has Fallen (2019). The films also star Aaron Eckhart as U.S. President Benjamin Asher, and Morgan Freeman as the Speaker of the House (and eventual President) Allan Trumbull. The films received generally mixed reception and grossed a combined total of $523 million worldwide. In 2019 it was announced that the film series would continue, and as of May 2026, Night Has Fallen, a fourth film, is in production after a delay due to 2023 strikes and lawsuit settlements.

The franchise has also expanded with television spin-offs. The first of these, Paris Has Fallen, starring Tewfik Jallab and Ritu Arya, premiered on Canal+ in France on September 18, 2024 and on the American streaming service Hulu in the United States in December 2024 and on Disney+ in other territories. A sequel series, Apollo Has Fallen, premiered on Canal+ in France on September 14, 2026.

== Films ==
Has Fallen films
Film	U.S. release date	Directed by	Screenplay by	Story by	Produced by
Olympus Has Fallen	March 22, 2013	Antoine Fuqua	Katrin Benedikt & Creighton Rothenberger	Katrin Benedikt & Creighton Rothenberger	Mark Gill, Alan Siegel, Danny Lerner, Gerard Butler, Antoine Fuqua & Ed Cathell III
London Has Fallen	March 4, 2016	Babak Najafi	Chad St. John, Katrin Benedikt, Christian Gudegast & Creighton Rothenberger	Katrin Benedikt & Creighton Rothenberger	Mark Gill, Les Weldon, Alan Siegel, Matt O'Toole, Gerard Butler & John Thompson
Angel Has Fallen	August 23, 2019	Ric Roman Waugh	Matt Cook, Ric Roman Waugh & Robert Mark Kamen	Katrin Benedikt & Creighton Rothenberger	Les Weldon, Alan Siegel, Matt O'Toole, Yariv Lerner, Gerard Butler & John Thompson

=== Olympus Has Fallen (2013) ===
After a failed attempt to save First Lady Margaret Asher, disgraced Secret Service agent Mike Banning must take action after a North Korean terrorist group seizes control of the White House. Banning uses his inside knowledge to rescue President Benjamin Asher from his kidnappers.

=== London Has Fallen (2016) ===
During the funeral of the British Prime Minister in London, the city is attacked by a large army of Islamic terrorists, killing five world leaders, damaging major landmarks and generating mass panic, masterminded by Pakistani arms dealer Aamir Barkawi. When President Benjamin Asher is kidnapped by the terrorists, Secret Service agent Mike Banning must once again save him.

=== Angel Has Fallen (2019) ===
Mike Banning is framed for the attempted assassination of President Allan Trumbull by a rogue private military company and must race against time to clear his name while uncovering the real threat.

=== Future films ===
In November 2019, Alan Siegel announced that three additional Has Fallen films were in development. In November 2020, the fourth film, titled Night Has Fallen, was given the green light, with Butler announced to reprise his role as Mike Banning in addition to serving as producer, and Waugh to return as director, with a script co-written with Kamen. The project was to be a joint venture production between G-BASE, Eclectic Pictures, Campbell Grobman Films, and Millennium Media. In October 2023, after a lengthy lawsuit, it was confirmed that monetary disputes between Butler and Millennium Media/Nu Image had been settled, and production on Night Has Fallen was expected to commence after the end of the 2023 actors' and writers' strikes.

== Television ==
Series	Season	Episodes	Originally released			Showrunner	Status
Series	Season	Episodes	First released	Last released	Network	Showrunner	Status
Paris Has Fallen	1	8	September 23, 2024	November 4, 2024	Canal+	Howard Overman	Concluded
Apollo Has Fallen	1	8	September 14, 2026	October 26, 2026	Canal+	Howard Overman	Concluded

=== Paris Has Fallen (2024) ===
In November 2019, it was announced that multiple television series spin-offs were being developed. Because of the film series' popularity in other territories, plans included various television series to debut in foreign countries, with each show's local mother tongues used as the spoken languages. Siegel said that the TV shows would expand the franchise and add additional characters to appear in future films. In November 2020, the studio confirmed that development for a television series was ongoing.

In November 2021, Millennium Media confirmed that a Has Fallen television series was in development. In May 2023, Mathieu Kassovitz was tapped to lead the new series Paris Has Fallen, with StudioCanal producing and Howard Overman penning the screenplays. In October 2023, Kassovitz was replaced by Tewfik Jallab due to creative differences. On August 29, 2024, the trailer for the series was released, and the series premiered on September 23, 2024, on Canal+. The eight-part series premiered on SBS Television in Australia on September 26, 2024. It was released in the United States on Hulu in December 2024.

=== Apollo Has Fallen (2026) ===
On March 28, 2025, it was announced that a second series continuing with some of the same actors, Apollo Has Fallen, was in production, with filming underway. Apollo Has Fallen premiered on Canal+ in France on 14 September 2026.

== Cast and characters ==
Overview of cast and characters from the Has Fallen franchise
Character	Film				Television	
Character	Olympus Has Fallen	London Has Fallen	Angel Has Fallen	Night Has Fallen	Paris Has Fallen	Apollo Has Fallen
Character	2013	2016	2019	TBA	2024	2026
Michael Jameson "Mike" Banning	Gerard Butler	Gerard Butler	Gerard Butler	Gerard Butler		
Allan Trumbull	Morgan Freeman	Morgan Freeman	Morgan Freeman			
Leah Banning	Radha Mitchell	Radha Mitchell	Piper Perabo			
Benjamin "Ben" Asher	Aaron Eckhart	Aaron Eckhart				
Ruth McMillan	Melissa Leo	Melissa Leo				
Edward Clegg	Robert Forster	Robert Forster				
Lynne Jacobs	Angela Bassett	Angela Bassett				
Ray Monroe	Sean O'Bryan	Sean O'Bryan				
Lawrence O'Donnell	Lawrence O'Donnell	Lawrence O'Donnell				
Margaret Asher	Ashley Judd	Mentioned				
Connor Asher	Finley Jacobsen	Mentioned				
Lynne Banning		Mentioned	Jessica and Maisie Cobley			
Dave Forbes	Dylan McDermott					
Agent Roma	Cole Hauser					
Kang Yeonsak	Rick Yune					
Jacqueline Marshall		Charlotte Riley				
Mason		Jackie Earle Haley				
Sir Kevin Hazard		Colin Salmon				
Aamir Barkawi		Alon Aboutboul				
Kamran Barkawi		Waleed Zuaiter				
Clay Banning			Nick Nolte			
Wade Jennings			Danny Huston			
Agent Helen Thompson			Jada Pinkett Smith			
David Gentry			Lance Reddick			
Martin Kirby			Tim Blake Nelson			
Vincent Taleb					Tewfik Jallab	Tewfik Jallab
Zara Taylor					Ritu Arya	Ritu Arya
Jacob Pearce					Sean Harris	
Freja Karlsson					Ana Ularu	
Théa					Camille Rutherford	
Matis Garnier					Jérémie Covillault	

== Additional crew and production details ==
Overview of production crew and details for the Has Fallen franchise
Title	Composer(s)	Cinematographer(s)	Editor(s)	Production companies	Distributing company	Running time
Olympus Has Fallen	Trevor Morris	Conrad W. Hall	John Refoua	Millennium Films, Nu Image, G-BASE, FortyFour Studios, West Coast Film Partners	FilmDistrict	1 hr 49 mins
London Has Fallen	Trevor Morris	Ed Wild	Paul Martin Smith and Michael Duthie	Millennium Films, G-BASE, Gramercy Pictures, LHF Film, Nu Boyana Film Studios	Focus Features	1 hr 39 mins
Angel Has Fallen	David Buckley	Jules O'Loughlin	Gabriel Fleming	Millennium Media, G-BASE, CB Films, Cinesite Studios, Eclectic Pictures, Nu Boyana Film Studios	Lionsgate	2 hrs 1 min
Paris Has Fallen	Ian Arber & Dave Rowntree	Adam Etherington & Philippe Kress	Mathieu Depuydt, Boaz Mann, Philippe Ravoet, and Omri Zalmona	Millennium Media, G-BASE, StudioCanal, Urban Myth Films, Eclectic Pictures, Nu Boyana Film Studios	Canal+	5 hrs 24 mins (43 min episodes)
Apollo Has Fallen	Ian Arber & Dave Rowntree	Adam Etherington & Dale Elena McCready	Julian Ulrichs	Millennium Media, G-BASE, StudioCanal, Urban Myth Films, Eclectic Pictures, Nu Boyana Film Studios	Canal+	7 hrs 52 mins (52 min episodes)

== Reception ==
Box office performance for the Has Fallen films
Film	Box office gross				Budget
Film	Opening weekend (North America)	North America	Other territories	Worldwide	Budget
Olympus Has Fallen	$30,373,794	$98,925,640	$71,344,561	$170,270,201	$70 million
London Has Fallen	$21,635,601	$62,524,260	$143,230,187	$205,754,447	$60 million
Angel Has Fallen	$21,380,987	$69,030,436	$78,471,554	$147,501,990	$40 million
Total	$73,390,382	$230,634,684	$293,046,302	$523,526,638	$170 million

- Adjusted totals based on current ticket prices (calculated by Box Office Mojo)

Critical and public response for the Has Fallen films
Film	Rotten Tomatoes	Metacritic	CinemaScore
Olympus Has Fallen	49% (198 reviews)	41 (30 reviews)	A−
London Has Fallen	28% (196 reviews)	28 (35 reviews)	A−
Angel Has Fallen	38% (190 reviews)	45 (33 reviews)	A−
