= Paris Has Fallen =

2024 action-thriller television series

- Release poster
- Genre: Action; Thriller
- Created by: Howard Overman
- Written by: Howard Overman
- Directed by: Oded Ruskin; Hans Herbots
- Starring: Tewfik Jallab; Ritu Arya; Sean Harris
- Theme music composer: Ian Arber; Dave Rowntree
- Countries of origin: France; United Kingdom; United States
- Original languages: French; English
- No. of episodes: 8

Production
- Executive producers: Johnny Capps; Julian Murphy
- Producers: Alan Siegel; Johnny Capps; Julian Murphy; Gerard Butler; Howard Overman; Avi Lerner; Jeffrey Greenstein; Jonathan Yunger; Yariv Lerner; Heidi Jo Markel
- Cinematography: Adam Etherington; Philippe Kress
- Production companies: StudioCanal; G-BASE (Gerard Butler & Alan Siegel); Millennium Media; Urban Myth Films (Johnny Capps, Julian Murphy, Howard Overman)

Original release
- Network: Canal+
- Release: 23 September – 4 November 2024

Related
- Has Fallen

Paris Has Fallen is a 2024 French and English-language action television series. It is written by Howard Overman and directed by Oded Ruskin and Hans Herbots. The cast is led by Tewfik Jallab, Ritu Arya and Sean Harris.

== Premise ==
Set in the Has Fallen universe, a disillusioned former French Foreign Legion soldier launches a revenge attack against the French government.

== Cast ==
- Tewfik Jallab as Vincent Taleb, a Protection Service bodyguard and former French Army soldier
- Ritu Arya as Zara Taylor, an MI6 agent stationed in Paris working with the French authorities
- Sean Harris as Jacob Pearce, a British terrorist and former Captain in the French Foreign Legion
- Ana Ularu as Freja Karlsson, a Swedish mercenary and ex-Special Operations Group soldier working with Pearce
- Camille Rutherford as Théa, Zara's French love interest
- Jérémie Covillault as Matis Garnier, the Head of Counterterrorism at the DGSI
- Emmanuelle Bercot as Juliette Levesque, the President of France
- Nathan Willcocks as Philippe Bardin, the French Defence Minister
- Laurent Lucas as Pascal Moulin, the CEO of KMI Systems, a French defence contractor and weapons manufacturer
- Karl Collins as Rowan Alexander, a diplomat at the British Embassy in Paris and former MI6 Kabul Station Chief
- Paul Gorostidi as Lucas, a DGSI taskforce officer assisting Vincent and Zara

== Episodes ==
No.	Title	Directed by	Written by	Original release date
1	"Episode 1"	Oded Ruskin	Howard Overman	23 September 2024
A gala hosted at the British Embassy in Paris is attacked by terrorists led by Jacob Pearce, a disillusioned ex-French Foreign Legion soldier seeking revenge against those who caused him to be tortured and his men killed by the Taliban. He executes Rowan Alexander, a British diplomat and the former MI6 Kabul Station Chief. French Defence Minister Philippe Bardin is also targeted, but gets extracted by his Protection Service bodyguard Vincent Taleb with the help of MI6 officer Zara Taylor. It is revealed Pearce's team was killed when they tried to capture a Taliban leader, and he was only rescued by coincidence after six years following a US Special Forces raid on the same location. At the behest of President Juliette Levesque, Matis Garnier of the DGSI assigns Taleb and Taylor to a taskforce targeting Pearce’s group. Levesque and Taleb have a personal connection, having previously had a romantic liaison when he was on her protection detail. The taskforce trace weapons used in the embassy attack to arms dealer Karim Hassan. Bardin is secured at the Hôtel de Brienne but his daughter Chloe is kidnapped by Pearce before she can be taken to a safehouse. Pearce forces Bardin to commit suicide in exchange for her safety, and allows her to be rescued by police.
2	"Episode 2"	Oded Ruskin	Howard Overman	23 September 2024
Pearce releases his manifesto to the public. Taleb and Taylor track Hassan to a meeting with Matthew, one of Pearce’s men. A chase and fight ensues where Hasan is killed and Matthew escapes. Pascal Moulin, the CEO of defence contractor KMI Systems, is threatened by Pearce, who demands €100 million for the lives of his men and the torture he endured. Pearce kills Moulin's personal bodyguard to prove his resolve. The taskforce discovers Moulin pressured Bardin to betray Pearce because his actions in Afghanistan were bad for KMI’s business. Levesque and the Elysee Palace worry that Pearce’s videos are garnering public sympathy. Taylor faces personal issues with her drug addict girlfriend Thea. Matis tells Taleb and Taylor that after escaping captivity and relocating to Lahore, Pakistan, Pearce was severely injured in a car bomb that killed his girlfriend Amina and her two children. They theorise he was targeted to stop him revealing the truth about his betrayal. Taleb kills Matthew when he targets Moulin’s teenage son. The taskforce investigates how Pearce is funding his activities. Moulin reluctantly pays €100 million to Pearce, but is kidnapped and burned alive with the money. Pearce announces he can’t be bought, and is coming for everyone involved.
3	"Episode 3"	Oded Ruskin	Howard Overman	30 September 2024
Pearce tortures Cedric Duval, the DGSE agent who planted the car bomb. Duval divulges his supervising handler was Beatrice Paquin. Taleb and President Levesque appear to restore their relationship. The DGSE begrudgingly gives the now retired Paquin’s name to the taskforce, and she is taken to a safehouse by Taleb and Taylor. Pearce tells the DGSE he will pay €5 million to anyone who gives him valuable information. After discovering Paquin is dying of a heart condition and yearns to return to fieldwork, Taylor convinces her to use herself as bait to draw Pearce out. After staging a car accident to delay the taskforce, Pearce boards the same bus as Paquin and confronts her. She insists he pay €5 million to a bank account in the name of her estranged son before revealing anything. Taleb and Taylor engage in a gunfight with Pearce’s men, but he escapes and Paquin is mortally wounded. Before dying, she tells a shocked Taleb what she told Pearce: that Levesque ordered the hit on him and his family. Taleb confronts Levesque, who admits ordering the hit on Pearce, but not his family, to stop him from telling the truth. She claims she had no choice as it could have ruined her presidency even before it truly began. Taleb warns her she will be targeted next.
4	"Episode 4"	Oded Ruskin	Howard Overman	7 October 2024
All of Levesque’s engagements are cancelled and the Elysee Palace is locked down. After confronting and killing Shaun Walker, a member of Pearce’s group, Taleb and Taylor discover the corpse of a skydiving company owner in his car. Freja, a Swedish mercenary working with Pearce, updates her boss Richard. Not ideologically aligned with Pearce, Richard orders her to handle him if he risks causing a market crash. Pearce and his team hack Orly Airport’s ATC, forcing a cargo plane to divert and land at a small airstrip outside Paris where they take control of it and kill its onboard security team. Taleb and Taylor intercept, but are overpowered and taken onto the plane, which takes off again. Pearce tries to justify his revenge mission to Taleb, a former French Army soldier. Meanwhile, Freja secures Uranium the plane was transporting. Taylor and Taleb are unable to stop Freja and Pearce from escaping via parachute, but land the plane. Deducing Pearce plans to create a dirty bomb from the Uranium, Levesque is evacuated from Paris. Taleb and Taylor worry there is a mole in the taskforce, as Pearce always seems ahead of them. Pearce recruits his old friend Farid to construct the dirty bomb. That night, Taleb promises a scared Levesque he will protect her to the end.
5	"Episode 5"	Hans Herbots	Howard Overman	14 October 2024
The taskforce links Shaun to an Afghan named Sami Bensaid, with ties to Pearce. Taleb and Taylor bug his house, and discover he is dating Esin, the eldest and only surviving daughter of Amina. Upon discovering Esin is an illegal immigrant, they monitor her and determine she is in contact with Pearce. Farid completes the dirty bomb, and Pearce admits that he is reluctant to use it. After witnessing Esin and Sami talk about leaving Paris, Taleb wonders if Pearce already warned her about the bomb. Impersonating immigration officers, Taleb and the taskforce interview Esin and place a tracker in her passport before releasing her. Despite Taylor's objections, Taleb breaks his cover whilst carrying out surveillance and saves Esin and Sami from a violent loan shark targeting them. Garnier checks for moles in the taskforce and brings in BRI support. Esin later abandons Sami and makes her way to Pearce, who tells her to ditch her passport, further confirming their concerns the taskforce has a mole. After Esin calls Sami to say goodbye, the taskforce locates her and Pearce. After an intense gunfight, Pearce, Freja and Esin wait for a helicopter to arrive. Taylor detains Esin and threatens to kill her unless Pearce surrenders, which he does on the condition that Freja and Esin leave on the helicopter.
6	"Episode 6"	Hans Herbots	Howard Overman	21 October 2024
Analysis of Pearce’s phone implicates DGSI agent Lucas, who is arrested as the suspected mole but denies all accusations. During interrogation, Pearce questions why Taleb, a former soldier, continues to work for Levesque. Garnier is informed that Pearce is to be transported to Évreux-Fauville Air Base. Taylor discovers he will then be sent to a black site in Morocco and likely be killed on orders of President Levesque to protect her reputation. Freja tells Richard their plan to extract Pearce won't be easy, but assures that he won't talk in custody. The taskforce delays Pearce's transfer to the air base. Lucas’s ex-girlfriend and fellow DGSI agent Simone is revealed to be the mole, and leads an assault on DGSI headquarters with Pearce’s men disguised as RAID operatives. Garnier is shot, and Taylor is incapacitated by Simone whilst trying to evacuate Pearce. Simone and Pearce escape using the chaos and a car bomb as cover. Lucas is released the next morning, and Garnier recovers in hospital. Taleb confronts Levesque for trying to kill Pearce again, but she refuses to apologise. Pearce and his men load the bomb into a truck, parking it on a busy street in the 7th arrondissement. He calls Taleb and forces him to deliver a message to Levesque: hand herself over in 48 hours or it detonates.
7	"Episode 7"	Hans Herbots	Howard Overman	28 October 2024
From the Jupiter Command Post bunker, Levesque agrees with her cabinet that Paris needs to be evacuated by 6pm, as she cannot hand herself over to Pearce. The taskforce discovers Simone betrayed them as she used to date a member of Pearce’s Foreign Legion team killed in Afghanistan. After questioning her sister, Taleb and Taylor track down Simone and take her into custody. After appealing to her conscience, she reluctantly discloses the bomb’s location. Richard instructs Freja to kill Pearce once the mission is done, and is shown to be financially benefiting from the chaos. The van is under surveillance, but the taskforce loops the video feed and takes out a spotter so they can approach. However, EOD doesn't have enough time to disarm it before Pearce discovers the deception. He calls Taleb and threatens to detonate immediately unless he brings Levesque to him. He also instructs Freja to kidnap Thea, Taylor's partner, for insurance. Taleb and Taylor are forced to abandon the van, and an evacuation order is issued. Taylor suggests using Levesque to draw out and kill Pearce, which he won’t expect. Taleb questions this, knowing they will need to go against her security team who would never allow it. Taleb visits Levesque in the bunker and tells her the plan.
8	"Episode 8"	Hans Herbots	Howard Overman	4 November 2024

== Production ==
The eight-part series is written by Howard Overman and produced by StudioCanal, Urban Myth Films, and Millennium Media and G-BASE, the two companies that produced the Has Fallen film franchise. Eclectic Pictures is also attached. Johnny Capps, Julian Murphy, and Howard Overman are producers for Urban Myth, whilst Gerard Butler and Alan Siegel produce for G-Base. For Millenium Media Avi Lerner is a producer along with Jeffrey Greenstein, Jonathan Yunger, and Yariv Lerner as well as Heidi Jo Markel from Eclectic Pictures. Lati Grobman is an executive producer. The lead directors are Oded Ruskin and Hans Herbots. Filming took place in October 2023 with filming locations including Paris and London. Filming for the second season occurred in Bristol in February 2025.

Mathieu Kassovitz was initially cast in the lead role but was later replaced by Tewfik Jallab. Other cast members include Sean Harris, Ritu Arya and Camille Rutherford, as well as Ana Ularu, Jérémie Covillault and Emmanuelle Bercot.

== Release ==
The series was shown on Canal+ in France from 23 September 2024. It premiered in Australia on public broadcaster SBS on 26 September 2024. The series was released in the United Kingdom on Amazon Prime Video on 1 November 2024. All eight episodes premiered in the United States on 6 December 2024, on Hulu. It also premiered in India on Lionsgate Play from 18 December 2024.

== Reception ==
Neil Armstrong in the i newspaper praised the performance of Arya and described it as a "silly but enjoyable action thriller". Adam Sweeting for The Arts Desk gave the show four stars and praised "strong work from Arya and Jallab" but felt that "the show’s major calling card is Sean Harris".

== Sequel ==
On March 28, 2025, it was announced that a second series continuing with some of the same actors, Apollo Has Fallen, was in production, with filming underway.
