= Apollo Has Fallen =

2026 action-thriller television series

- Genre: Action; Thriller
- Created by: Howard Overman
- Written by: Howard Overman
- Directed by: David Caffrey; Alice Troughton
- Starring: Tewfik Jallab; Ritu Arya
- Countries of origin: France; United Kingdom; United States
- Original language: English
- No. of episodes: 8

Production
- Executive producers: Alan Siegel; Gerard Butler; Johnny Capps; Howard Overman; Avi Lerner; Jonathan Yunger; Yariv Lerner; Mary-Kathryn Kennedy; Paul Gilbert
- Producer: Julian Murphy
- Running time: 8 x 52 minutes
- Production companies: StudioCanal; G-BASE; Millennium Media; Urban Myth Films

Original release
- Network: Canal+
- Release: 14 September – 26 October 2026

Related
- Has Fallen

Apollo Has Fallen is an action thriller television series, part of the Has Fallen franchise, and a sequel to Paris Has Fallen (released in 2024). Returning cast members include Ritu Arya and Tewfik Jallab. A co-production from France, the UK, and the US, the series premiered on Canal+ in France on 14 September 2026.

== Premise ==
A hijacking causes Europe to be threatened by a deadly virus.

== Cast ==
- Tewfik Jallab as Vincent Taleb, former French police officer and former security chief of France's Defense Minister
- Ritu Arya as Zara Taylor, a MI6 operative
- Jacek Koman as Yuri Mishkin, CEO of the private military company (PMC) Volotov
- Richard Dormer as Kane, Zara's former MI6 instructor
- Charlotte Spencer as Karen, an MI6 operative working for Voltov
- Arthur Darvill as Andrew, head of MI6's North Africa division and Karen's lover
- Annabel Scholey as Dr. Rachel Moss (Apollo), head of research at the National Microbiology Institute in Madrid
- Aylin Tezel as Hannah, a PMC operative working for the MI6 and Zara's love interest
- Kevin Jarvis as Russian government official
- Witold Preyss as Russian general

== Episodes ==
No.	Title	Directed by	Written by	Original release date
1	"Episode 1"	David Caffrey	Howard Overman	14 September 2026
2	"Episode 2"	David Caffrey	Howard Overman	14 September 2026
3	"Episode 3"	David Caffrey	Howard Overman	21 September 2026
4	"Episode 4"	David Caffrey	Howard Overman	28 September 2026
5	"Episode 5"	Alice Troughton	Howard Overman	5 October 2026
6	"Episode 6"	Alice Troughton	Howard Overman	12 October 2026
7	"Episode 7"	Alice Troughton	Howard Overman	19 October 2026
8	"Episode 8"	Alice Troughton	Howard Overman	26 October 2026

== Production ==
The series is a sequel to 2024 action series Paris Has Fallen, the production of which was confirmed in March 2025.

It is made by StudioCanal, Urban Myth Films, Millennium Media and G-Base. It is written by series creator Howard Overman with David Caffrey as lead director alongside Alice Troughton. The cast is led by Ritu Arya and Tewfik Jallab, alongside Jacek Koman and Richard Dormer as well as Charlotte Spencer, Arthur Darvill, Annabel Scholey and Aylin Tezel. Filming locations include the United Kingdom, Malta and Spain. Principal photography began in March 2025.

== Broadcast ==
Apollo Has Fallen premiered on Canal+ in France on 14 September 2026. It aired on SBS Television and SBS on Demand in Australia on 16 September.

It will air on streaming services Hulu in the US and Amazon Prime Video in the UK.
