= Angel Has Fallen =

2019 film by Ric Roman Waugh

- Theatrical release poster
- Directed by: Ric Roman Waugh
- Screenplay by: Robert Mark Kamen; Matt Cook; Ric Roman Waugh
- Story by: Creighton Rothenberger; Katrin Benedikt
- Based on: Characters by: Creighton Rothenberger; Katrin Benedikt
- Produced by: Gerard Butler; Alan Siegel; Matt O'Toole; John Thompson; Les Weldon; Yariv Lerner
- Starring: Gerard Butler; Morgan Freeman; Jada Pinkett Smith; Lance Reddick; Tim Blake Nelson; Piper Perabo; Nick Nolte; Danny Huston
- Cinematography: Jules O'Loughlin
- Edited by: Gabriel Fleming
- Music by: David Buckley
- Production companies: Millennium Media; G-BASE
- Distributed by: Lionsgate (United States and United Kingdom); Zon Lusomundo Audiovisuais (Portugal); VVS Films (Canada); BS Films (Bulgaria)
- Release dates: August 20, 2019 (Hollywood); August 23, 2019 (United States and United Kingdom); August 30, 2019 (Bulgaria)
- Running time: 121 minutes
- Countries: United States; United Kingdom; Portugal; Canada; Bulgaria
- Language: English
- Budget: $40 million
- Box office: $146.7 million

Angel Has Fallen is a 2019 political action thriller film directed by Ric Roman Waugh. It is the third installment in the Has Fallen film series, following Olympus Has Fallen (2013) and London Has Fallen (2016). The film stars Gerard Butler, Morgan Freeman, Jada Pinkett Smith, Lance Reddick, Tim Blake Nelson, Piper Perabo, Nick Nolte, and Danny Huston. The plot again follows United States Secret Service agent Mike Banning as he races against time to clear his name after being framed for a drone attack on President of the United States Allan Trumbull.

The film was officially announced in October 2016, and Roman Waugh was hired in July 2017. New members of the cast were added in early 2018, and filming began in February of that year around Bulgaria and the United Kingdom.

The film was released in the United States and United Kingdom on August 23, 2019, by Lionsgate. It received mixed reviews from critics and grossed $146 million worldwide. Plans for future sequels and TV spin-offs are in development.

== Plot ==
Secret Service agent Mike Banning undergoes training at a paramilitary facility in Virginia, owned by his former Army Ranger commanding officer Wade Jennings, now CEO of private military company Salient Global. Banning is recommended for the position of Secret Service director by U.S. President Allan Trumbull, to replace retiring director David Gentry, but hides the fact that he suffers from migraines and insomnia and takes painkillers to cope with chronic back pain from previous combat injuries.

While Trumbull is on a private fishing trip at Queen's Lake in Williamsburg, a swarm of armed drones attacks and kills his protection detail, with only Banning surviving and saving him. Both are incapacitated, but Banning recovers, while Trumbull is left in a coma. FBI agent Helen Thompson is presented with falsified evidence implicating Banning in the attack, leading to his arrest.

En route to a detention facility, Banning's transport is ambushed, but he escapes after killing the attackers and unmasking them as mercenaries from Salient Global with whom he took part in a training exercise. Realizing that Jennings has betrayed and framed him, Banning calls his wife Leah from a nearby gas station, letting her know he is alive and determined to expose the real perpetrator.

The call alerts Thompson to his location, forcing Banning to steal a militia man's 18-wheeler truck while pursued by many police officers. Banning escapes after crashing the truck, and eventually makes his way to his estranged father, Clay, who has been living off-grid in a cabin in the backwoods of White Hall, West Virginia.

At the White House, Vice President Martin Kirby, now acting president, tells the press that Banning is responsible for the assassination attempt with support from the Russian government. Banning and his father detect Salient mercenaries approaching the house, so Clay detonates multiple explosives around the perimeter, killing the would-be attackers as he and Banning escape.

Splitting up, Clay goes to Banning's house and saves Leah and Lynne from a kidnapping attempt by Jennings' mercenaries. Finding the bodies of Jennings' gunmen lined up against Clay's cabin, Thompson deduces that Banning was being set up, after all. Trumbull awakens from his coma and Kirby is revealed to be Jennings' secret co-conspirator, planning to retaliate for Trumbull's "attempted assassination" against Russia. Thompson and another agent, Ramirez, confront Jennings on an airfield, but he kills them both and the helicopter (AW-109) pilot as well.

Banning reaches the hospital and turns himself in. Trumbull orders his release when he realizes that the Salient mercenaries are attempting to kill him, and only Banning can keep him alive. Banning leads him to safety with help from Gentry and other loyal agents, as Jennings' mercenaries increase the hospital's intensive care unit's oxygen and nitrogen supply to unstable levels, causing an explosion that levels the hospital.

Banning hides Trumbull and Gentry as Jennings' men pursue them. In the ensuing gun battle, Jennings and his men kill most of Trumbull's security detail, but Banning thwarts a flanking attempt and forces the mercenaries to retreat after they are delayed long enough to allow U.S. federal law enforcement officers to arrive. Jennings and his remaining men are gathering on the rooftop to escape in a helicopter (Bell 430), but Banning destroys it with a rifle- grenade launcher. Although Jennings manages to survive the explosion, Banning fatally wounds him in a knife fight.

Banning is exonerated, while Trumbull and Gentry arrest Kirby for treason and corruption, revealing that Jennings had kept detailed records of his involvement as an insurance policy, which were uncovered by Thompson. Clay decides to live with Banning and his family. Feeling guilty over his failure to protect Trumbull and concealing his ailments, Banning offers his resignation, but Trumbull forgives him and again offers Banning the promotion to director, which he proudly accepts.

== Cast ==
- Gerard Butler as Secret Service Agent Mike Banning, a former Army Ranger RRC, Clay's son, and Leah's husband.
- Morgan Freeman as President Allan Trumbull, the former Speaker of the House, Vice President, and now the current President of the United States, succeeding Benjamin Asher, who was portrayed by Aaron Eckhart in the first two films.
- Jada Pinkett Smith as FBI Agent Helen Thompson, an FBI special agent tasked with arresting and hunting down Mike Banning, believing him to be responsible for the attack against the President.
- Lance Reddick as Secret Service director David Gentry
- Tim Blake Nelson as Vice President Martin Kirby
- Piper Perabo as Leah Banning, Mike's wife. Perabo replaced Radha Mitchell, who played the role in the previous films, due to Mitchell's scheduling conflicts.
- Nick Nolte as Clay Banning, a Vietnam veteran Army Ranger/tunnel rat and Mike's estranged father.
- Danny Huston as Wade Jennings, Mike's former Ranger commanding officer and the leader of Salient Global.
- Frederick Schmidt as Travis Cole, the head of security of Salient Global and Jennings' right-hand man.
- Michael Landes as White House Chief of Staff Sam Wilcox
- Joseph Millson as FBI Agent Ramirez
- Ori Pfeffer as Secret Service Agent Murphy
- Mark Arnold as CIA Director James Haskell
- Chris Browning as a militia man
- Jessica Cobley as Lynne Banning, Mike and Leah's daughter.
- Rocci Williams as Bruno, one of Jennings' soldiers.
- Antonio Bustorff as a mercenary

== Production ==
On October 28, 2016, a third Has Fallen installment, titled Angel Has Fallen, was announced to be in development, with Gerard Butler reprising his roles of both lead actor and producer. On July 25, 2017, Ric Roman Waugh was announced as director.

On January 10, 2018, Holt McCallany was set to play Wade Jennings, an ex-military turned head of a technology company. However, he later had to drop out of his role due to scheduling conflicts with the show Mindhunter, and was replaced by Danny Huston. A week later, Jada Pinkett Smith and Tim Blake Nelson were confirmed added, and filming was scheduled to start on February 7, 2018. On February 13, 2018, Piper Perabo joined the cast. On March 12, 2018, Lance Reddick was set to play Secret Service Director Gentry. Aaron Eckhart, who had played president Benjamin Asher in the first two films, announced he would not return in his role. On March 21, 2018, Michael Landes was cast as White House Chief of Staff Sam Wilcox. On January 22, 2019, David Buckley was announced as the film's composer, replacing Trevor Morris, who scored the previous two films.

Filming on Angel Has Fallen commenced at Virginia Water Lake, and continued throughout the United Kingdom and Bulgaria. Filming also took place at Pinewood Studios, Bray Studios, Longcross Studios, and Nu Boyana Film Studios.

== Release ==
The film was released in the United States and United Kingdom on August 23, 2019.

== Box office ==
Angel Has Fallen grossed $69 million in the United States and Canada, and $77.6 million in other territories, for a worldwide total of $146.7 million.

In the United States and Canada, the film was released alongside Overcomer and was projected to gross $13–15 million from 3,286 theaters in its opening weekend. It made $7.9 million on its first day. This included $1.5 million from Thursday night previews, the highest of the series. It went on to debut to $21.3 million, finishing first and over-performing. It was Butler's first time topping the box office since 300 (2007), and was just below the opening of London Has Fallen ($21.6 million). The film remained in first place the following weekend, grossing $11.8 million, as well as $3 million on Labor Day. The film was finally dethroned in its third weekend, grossing $6 million and finishing second, behind newcomer It Chapter Two.

== Reception ==
On Rotten Tomatoes, the film holds an approval rating of 38% based on 190 reviews, with an average rating of 5/10. The website's critical consensus reads: "Cut from the same rough cloth as its predecessors, Angel Has Fallen rounds out a mostly forgettable action trilogy in fittingly mediocre fashion." On Metacritic, the film has a weighted average score of 45 out of 100, based on 33 critics, indicating "mixed or average" reviews. Audiences polled by CinemaScore gave the film an average grade of "A−" on an A+ to F scale, the same score earned by its predecessors, while those at PostTrak gave it an average 4.5 out of 5 stars and a 64% "definite recommend".

Todd McCarthy of The Hollywood Reporter wrote that the film, "may not be appreciably better than the first two installments ..., but it's actually more fun — first and foremost because of a vastly amusing turn by Nick Nolte as Gerard Butler's eccentric Vietnam vet old coot father." Ignatiy Vishnevetsky of The A.V. Club gave the film a grade C, and called it a "dramatic improvement" though was critical of the action sequences, saying, "they all fall victim to having too much repetitive editing and not enough kinetic energy, a problem that no amount of onscreen firepower, twisted wreckage, or offbeat overhead camera angles can solve." David Ehrlich of IndieWire gave the film a "D+", specifying that "[w]ith Nolte as his bonkers dad, Gerard Butler's mediocre action franchise and his mediocre American accent find a mediocre conclusion."

== Future ==
In November 2019, series producer Alan Siegel announced plans for the fourth, fifth and sixth films, as well as local-language TV spin-offs that would tie in with the theatrical features. In November 2020, it was revealed at the American Film Market that a fourth film titled Night Has Fallen was in development, with Butler returning.

== See also ==
- Operation Spiderweb
