= The One (TV series) =

British science fiction television series

- Genre: Drama
- Created by: Howard Overman
- Based on: The One by John Marrs
- Starring: Hannah Ware; Dimitri Leonidas; Stephen Campbell Moore; Wilf Scolding; Diarmaid Murtagh; Lois Chimimba; Eric Kofi-Abrefa; Pallavi Sharda; Zoë Tapper; Albano Jerónimo; Gregg Chillin; Miguel Amorim
- Country of origin: United Kingdom
- Original language: English
- No. of series: 1
- No. of episodes: 8

Production
- Executive producers: Julian Murphy; Johnny Capps; Howard Overman
- Running time: 38–43 minutes
- Production companies: Urban Myth Films; StudioCanal

Original release
- Network: Netflix
- Release: 12 March 2021

The One is a British science fiction television series based on John Marrs's 2016 novel of the same name. It was created by Howard Overman and was released on Netflix on 12 March 2021.

== Cast and characters ==
- Hannah Ware as Rebecca Webb
- Dimitri Leonidas as James Whiting
- Amir El-Masry as Ben Naser
- Stephen Campbell Moore as Damien Brown
- Wilf Scolding as Ethan
- Diarmaid Murtagh as Connor Martin
- Lois Chimimba as Hannah Bailey
- Eric Kofi-Abrefa as Mark Bailey
- Pallavi Sharda as Megan Chapman
- Zoe Tapper as Kate Saunders
- Albano Jerónimo as Matheus Silva
- Gregg Chillin as Nick Gedny
- Nadia Albina as Amy Naser
- Simone Kirby as Charlotte Driscoll
- Laura Aikman as Lucy Bell

== Production ==
On 15 November 2018, it was announced that Netflix had given the production a series order for a first series consisting of eight episodes. The series was created by Howard Overman. Lois Chimimba who is a Scottish actress with a father from Malawi was cast as Hannah Bailey.

== Reception ==
Review aggregator Rotten Tomatoes reported an approval rating of 39% based on 18 reviews, with an average rating of 5.30/10. The website's critics consensus reads, "Too much plot and not enough resolve let The One down, but its fun and flashy thrills may be enough to keep viewers entertained - at least for a little while." Metacritic reported a weighted average score for the series of 51 out of 100 based on 9 reviews, indicating "mixed or average reviews".

== Episodes ==
No.	Title	Directed by	Written by	Original release date
1	"Episode 1"	Catherine Morshead	Howard Overman	12 March 2021
2	"Episode 2"	Catherine Morshead	Howard Overman	12 March 2021
3	"Episode 3"	Catherine Morshead	Howard Overman	12 March 2021
4	"Episode 4"	Jeremy Lovering	Howard Overman	12 March 2021
5	"Episode 5"	Jeremy Lovering	Howard Overman	12 March 2021
6	"Episode 6"	Jeremy Lovering	Howard Overman	12 March 2021
7	"Episode 7"	Brady Hood	Howard Overman	12 March 2021
8	"Episode 8"	Brady Hood	Howard Overman	12 March 2021
