= Crazyhead (TV series) =

2016 British TV series

- Genre: Comedy horror
- Created by: Howard Overman
- Written by: Howard Overman
- Directed by: Al Mackay; Declan O'Dwyer
- Starring: Cara Theobold; Susan Wokoma; Lewis Reeves; Arinze Kene; Riann Steele; Luke Allen-Gale; Tony Curran; Charlie Archer
- Composer: Stuart Hancock
- Countries of origin: United Kingdom; Ireland; United States
- Original language: English
- No. of series: 1
- No. of episodes: 6

Production
- Executive producers: Johnny Capps; Julian Murphy; Howard Overman
- Producer: Gareth Williams
- Production locations: Bristol, England
- Cinematography: Rasmus Arrildt; Anna Valdez Hanks
- Editors: Simon Reglar; Mark Thornton; David Barrett
- Running time: 43–45 minutes
- Production company: Urban Myth Films

Original release
- Network: E4 (UK and Ireland); Netflix (international)
- Release: 19 October – 23 November 2016

Crazyhead is a comedy horror television series created by Howard Overman, who also serves as an executive producer on the show with his company Urban Myth Films.

The six-part series premiered on E4 on 19 October 2016 in the United Kingdom, and internationally on 16 December 2016 on Netflix. The series is filmed in Bristol and is a Channel 4 and Netflix co-production.

In 2017, the show received three RTS West of England awards for Best Sound, Best Design and Best On-Screen Performance for Susie Wokoma as Raquel.

On 17 July 2017, Wokoma confirmed that Crazyhead had been cancelled. The series was later made available on Netflix in the United Kingdom on 16 February 2018.

== Cast and characters ==
=== Main ===
- Cara Theobold as Amy, an unhappy bowling alley worker who is a reluctant and rare "seer" – someone who sees demons hiding in society.
- Susan Wokoma as Raquel Francis, a socially awkward, lonely 'seer' and half-demon turned demon hunter who befriends Amy.
- Lewis Reeves as Jake, Amy's best friend from school and colleague. He has noticeable feelings for Amy but they are not mutual.
- Arinze Kene as Tyler, Raquel's brother, who shares an attraction with Amy and knows nothing of his sister's demon hunting.
- Riann Steele as Suzanne, Amy's best friend who turns into a revenant.
- Luke Allen-Gale as Sawyer, a demon with powers and Raquel's father.
- Tony Curran as Callum Weaver, a powerful demon, disguised as Raquel's psychiatrist.
- Charlie Archer as Harry, a demon who promised Raquel's father that he'd protect Raquel. He then later develops feelings for her.

=== Recurring ===
- Billy Seymour as Dylan, a demon and one of Callum's henchmen.
- Lu Corfield as Mercy, a demon moonlighting as a single mother while aiding Callum in his plan. She killed Raquel's father, Sawyer.

== Episodes ==
No.	Title	Directed by	Written by	Original release date	UK viewers (millions)
1	"A Very Trippy Horse"	Al Mackay	Howard Overman	19 October 2016	0.26
After being attacked by a demon only she can see, Amy is saved by Raquel, a demon hunter. From here she knows that she's not alone and isn't crazy, even though she has to see her psychiatrist Callum. Despite Raquel's quirks, Amy is desperate for her help when a demon passes on to its nearest host, Amy's best friend and roommate Suzanne. Together they need to perform an exorcism to free her, which fails and kills her.
2	"A Pine Fresh Scent"	Al Mackay	Howard Overman	26 October 2016	N/A
After accidentally killing Suzanne, Amy and Raquel are forced into burying her in the forest. Upon arriving home, Raquel bumps into a man who once saved her before from demons; this man is her father and also a demon. Callum puts out a squad of demon henchmen to do his work and attack them all.
3	"Shave the Cat"	Al Mackay	Howard Overman	2 November 2016	0.28
Suzanne returns from the dead as a revenant with a hunger for human flesh. Amy and Raquel take her captive and try to hide her in the country. Raquel meets Harry, a young man who seems to like her. Suzanne is captured by Callum.
4	"Penguin or Cow?"	Declan O'Dwyer	Howard Overman	9 November 2016	0.30
Amy and Raquel attempt to rescue Suzanne, who is being forced to entice Amy to her location so the demons can kill her. Amy frees Suzanne but is locked in a lift with Suzanne, who is hungry. Amy feeds Suzanne her own blood, and the demons free her thinking Suzanne has killed Amy, leading Suzanne to jump out of a window with one of the demons, killing them both.
5	"Downward Facing Dog"	Declan O'Dwyer	Howard Overman	16 November 2016	0.30
Raquel goes on a date with Harry, who turns out to be a demon hunter sent by Raquel's dad to protect her. However, when Amy has a premonition that Harry will attack her, Raquel foolishly refuses to believe her and breaks off their friendship. Amy and Jake are captured by the demons but are rescued by Harry and Raquel. Harry is shot and taken to hospital, where he is shown to be a demon in disguise and part of a plan to use Raquel to start the end of the world.
6	"Beaver with a Chainsaw"	Declan O'Dwyer	Howard Overman	23 November 2016	0.27
Raquel foolishly ignores Amy's warnings against visiting Harry in hospital. When she arrives, she is captured by the demons and held at their Halloween party, where they plan to use her to start the end of the world and open the gates of Hell, releasing thousands of demons. Amy and Jake sneak into the party, but Amy is captured. When Harry plays his part, revealing he is a demon and not really a boyfriend, Raquel's heartbreak opens the gates of Hell. Amy talks her down and the gate is soon closed, though one of the 50 or so demons that do escape possesses Jake. Amy conducts a successful exorcism on Jake. A few weeks later, Suzanne is shown to have been revived, watching Amy and Raquel from a distance as they track down the remaining demons.

== Reception ==
On the review aggregator website Rotten Tomatoes, 100% of 12 critics' reviews are positive, with an average rating of 7.0/10. The website's consensus reads: "A brilliantly bonkers blend of comedy and horror, Crazyhead slays thanks in large part to Cara Theobold and Susan Wokoma's dynamic chemistry."

The Guardian described the show as 'disturbing and excellent' as well as 'fizzy and fun.' They also praised the double act of Cara Theobold and Susan Wokoma. The Daily Telegraph described the show as 'bright, punchy and [a] genuinely funny series'.
