= Atlantis (TV series) =

British television series

- Genre: Adventure; Fantasy; Drama; Romance
- Created by: Johnny Capps; Julian Murphy; Howard Overman
- Starring: Jack Donnelly; Mark Addy; Robert Emms; Aiysha Hart; Sarah Parish; Juliet Stevenson; Jemima Rooper; Amy Manson
- Theme music composer: Rob Lane
- Composers: Rob Lane; James Gosling; Stuart Hancock
- Country of origin: United Kingdom
- Original language: English
- No. of series: 2
- No. of episodes: 25

Production
- Executive producers: Johnny Capps; Julian Murphy; Howard Overman; Bethan Jones
- Production locations: Wales & Morocco
- Cinematography: David Garbett; Dale Mccready
- Editor: Tom White
- Running time: 45 minutes 90 minutes (Series 2 Finale)
- Production company: Urban Myth Films

Original release
- Network: BBC One
- Release: 28 September 2013 – 16 May 2015

Atlantis is a British fantasy-adventure television programme inspired by Greek mythology and created by Johnny Capps and Julian Murphy with Howard Overman. It premiered on 28 September 2013 on BBC One. In the show, submarine pilot Jason washes up on the shores of legendary Atlantis and must navigate the powerful leaders of the mythological realm.

Atlantis was the biggest new Saturday night drama series launch across all BBC channels since 2006, even up on the launch of hit show Merlin. It also managed to draw 1 million viewers away from the highly popular ITV show The X Factor, which aired at the same time in the UK.

On 26 October 2013, BBC One ordered a second series of the show, which began airing on 15 November 2014. On 23 January 2015, it was announced that the series had been cancelled.

== Plot ==
In the modern day, Jason, the protagonist of the show, pilots a one-man submarine to investigate a deep sea disturbance that resulted in the disappearance of his father when he was a child. When he discovers the location, the submarine begins to fail and he is pulled into white light. He wakes up on the shores of the kingdom of Atlantis, which is ruled by the traditionalist King Minos and his power-hungry wife Queen Pasiphae, who seeks the throne for herself.

Initially on the run from the authorities, he is given shelter by a pair of unlucky and largely unemployed locals: Pythagoras – a young intellectual who has yet to uncover his theorem – and the ex-prize fighter Hercules – a hopeless romantic who spends most of his time in taverns drinking and gambling. The trio live out a series of Greek myths over the show's two season run, encountering monsters, gods, and demigods as they battle to do good and protect the innocent. Along the way, they acquire new allies and friends including Medusa, a palace maid; Ariadne, daughter of the King and heir to the throne; and the mysterious Oracle, who seems unsurprised at Jason's arrival and is in some way connected to him. The Oracle predicts that a world-changing destiny is in store for Jason if he remains on the right path.

== Cast ==
=== Main ===
- Mark Addy as Hercules
- Jack Donnelly as Jason
- Robert Emms as Pythagoras
- Aiysha Hart as Ariadne
- Sarah Parish as Pasiphae
- Juliet Stevenson as the Oracle
- Jemima Rooper as Medusa
- Amy Manson as Medea

=== Recurring ===
- Ken Bones as Melas, son of Poseidon and High Priest
- John Hannah as Tychon / Aeson
- Robert Lindsay as Daedalus
- Joseph Timms as Icarus
- Gary Oliver as Alytarch

Series 1

- Hannah Arterton as Korinna
- Lou Broadbent as Ione
- Lucy Cohu as Circe
- Joe Dixon as Ramos
- Alexander Siddig as King Minos
- Oliver Walker as Heptarian
- Ciarán Griffiths as Cyrus
- Nora-Jane Noone as Atalanta

Series 2

- Thomas Coombes as Critias
- Lorcan Cranitch as Cilix
- Peter de Jersey as Goran
- Amy Manson as Medea
- Ronald Pickup as Orpheus
- Robert Pugh as Sarpedon
- Vincent Regan as Dion, Ariadne's general
- Emmett J. Scanlan as Delmos
- Clive Standen as Telemon, an exiled prince of Aegina
- Anya Taylor-Joy as Cassandra
- Sian Thomas as Eurydice, the wife of Orpheus

== Episodes ==
Series	Episodes		Originally released	
Series	Episodes		First released	Last released
1	13		28 September 2013	28 December 2013
2	12	6	15 November 2014	20 December 2014
2	12	6	11 April 2015	16 May 2015

=== Series 1 (2013) ===
No. overall	No. in series	Title	Directed by	Written by	Original release date	UK viewers (millions)
1	1	"The Earth Bull"	Justin Molotnikov	Howard Overman	28 September 2013	7.36
In the present Jason goes in search of his father's missing vessel and finds himself washed up on the shores of a mysterious land – a world of mythical creatures, soothsaying oracles and palaces so vast it is said they were built by giants: this is the city of Atlantis but it seems the newcomer has chosen the wrong time to arrive in the fabled realm and Jason soon finds himself at the mercy of a deadly ritual, from which there can be no escape. In the end, he stays with Hercules and Pythagoras.
2	2	"A Girl By Any Other Name"	Justin Molotnikov	Howard Overman	5 October 2013	6.37
Despite their newfound fame after slaying the Minotaur, the boys are still penniless and hungry. When an old man asks them to find his missing daughter things seem on the up, but it soon becomes clear that their task isn't going to be an easy one: she has been taken by the Maenads, fanatical worshippers of the god Dionysus. With the hopes and life of the old man fading, it's a race against time that Jason cannot turn his back on. But just when their perilous task seems at an end, he comes face-to-face with a stranger named Medusa.
3	3	"A Boy of No Consequence"	Justin Molotnikov	Howard Overman	12 October 2013	6.24
Jason's hasty actions have dire consequences for the trio as they are forced to compete in the perilous sport of bull-leaping. After crossing a young nobleman, Jason and his friends find themselves at the mercy of King Minos, who declares Poseidon will decide their fate: they are to become bull leapers. To survive they must jump the charging beast. With their lives on the line, it's up to Jason to pull his motley team together in this ultimate test of bravery but watching from the crowds is a dark force, who hopes to turn the favour of the gods against them.
4	4	"Twist of Fate"	Alice Troughton	Richard McBrien	19 October 2013	6.08
While hunting in the mountains, the boys stumble across an abandoned baby. Jason refuses to leave the child to die and insists he return home with them to Atlantis but this charitable act has far-reaching implications and our gang soon find themselves embroiled in a complicated web of secrets and lies. With their own lives now on the line, as well as the child's, it seems they may well pay the ultimate price for interfering with fate.
5	5	"White Lies"	Alice Troughton	Howard Overman	26 October 2013	5.61
When a clandestine messenger brings unexpected news from outside the city, Ariadne calls on Jason and his friends to help guide her to the source. But leaving the citadel without raising the suspicions of the Queen seems an insurmountable task, especially with the revelation that it is Ariadne's exiled brother Therus who has sent for her. As Heptarian and the King's guards close in on his hiding place, Ariadne must decide where her loyalties lie, in Atlantis or with her royal sibling. Meanwhile, Therus is determined his sister learn the truth behind his exile, exposing a plot that could overshadow Minos' power and bring the royal family to its knees.
6	6	"The Song of the Sirens"	Declan O'Dwyer	Lucy Watkins	2 November 2013	5.89
Desperate to win over Medusa's heart, Hercules pays a visit to a powerful witch, Circe but events take a malevolent turn when Hercules realises he has unleashed a potent but toxic enchantment that threatens to turn his burgeoning hope into unbearable grief. With a bitter chain of events rapidly unfolding, it's up to Jason to undo history before it is too late. As he re-traces Hercules' steps into the mountains, he is unaware that a deadly trap has been set for him – one with far-reaching consequences beyond the fate of just his friends.
7	7	"The Rules of Engagement"	Declan O'Dwyer	Richard McBrien	9 November 2013	5.52
When Jason learns of Ariadne's betrothal to Heptarian, he is brokenhearted. With nothing to lose and everything to gain, he enters into a brutal fighting tournament to honour the nuptials – lining up with a bevy of terrifying contestants including the undefeated Heptarian. Determined to beat the husband-to-be and show his worthiness, it's up to Jason's loyal friends to guide him through the contest where there are more than just broken hearts at stake.
8	8	"The Furies"	Alice Troughton	Julian Jones	16 November 2013	5.43
The boys gain an unexpected addition to their workforce with the arrival of Pythagoras' feisty younger brother, Arcas. Charged with escorting a valuable cargo across the desert, the gang travels into the unknown with a ramshackle caravan of strangers. It isn't long before their journey takes a decidedly spooky turn; after spending a night in a temple dedicated to The Furies, it soon becomes clear that one among their number has something to hide. As danger closes in and a dark secret is exposed, our heroes are forced to confront some uncomfortable truths as they fight for their lives under the desert sun.
9	9	"Pandora's Box"	Declan O'Dwyer	Howard Overman	30 November 2013	5.26
Romance is at last in the air for Hercules and Medusa until she is kidnapped by a cruel moneylender, Kyros. In exchange for her life Kyros demands that Hercules retrieve a precious and powerful artefact from the Underworld – a task which can only mean certain death. With only one day to fulfill the ransom, it's a race against time for Hercules and his loyal friends. Will they find another way to descend to Hades and return with the artefact, or be forced to walk among the dead forever? Whatever the outcome, the gods have spoken and someone, somewhere is about to pay a terrible price.
10	10	"The Price of Hope"	Alice Troughton	Howard Overman	7 December 2013	5.27
After the tragic events surrounding Medusa's disappearance, the boys pay a visit to the inventor Daedalus whose genius offers hope of a cure but, unwilling to wait for answers, Hercules acts on information from the unscrupulous Crios and sets off in search of his lost love. His decision soon sees the boys literally running for their lives as they become the prey in a brutal manhunt. With hopes of an escape fading fast, their courage is tested to its limit, until a lifeline comes from an unexpected source.
11	11	"Hunger Pangs"	Alice Troughton	Julian Jones	14 December 2013	5.34
Penniless and starving, Jason cannot believe his luck when he stumbles across an abandoned feast. Temptation proves too much and he helps himself to the bounty, savouring his first proper meal in days but it soon becomes clear that Jason's gluttony has come at a price as he begins to exhibit some seriously strange behaviour. As things spiral out of control, it falls to Hercules and Pythagoras to save their friend before Heptarian and the palace guards bring his exertions to heel for good.
12	12	"Touched by the Gods: Part One"	Jeremy Webb	Howard Overman	21 December 2013	6.36
Jason is reminded of his promise to Circe and her grim warning should he fail to honour their pact. With her threat hanging over him he has no choice but to act. He must kill the Queen. Infiltrating the palace will not only be mortally dangerous but also nigh on impossible. Under the cover of night, our heroes set out, but soon Jason's intentions start to unravel. As the alarm is raised, it's going to take more than just courage and chemistry to save his life – he needs the help of someone on the inside.
13	13	"Touched by the Gods: Part Two"	Jeremy Webb	Howard Overman	28 December 2013	4.90
Minos's health continues to fade as the tyrannical machinations of Pasiphae reach their zenith. She sentences Ariadne to a gruesome execution not even the worst of enemies would deserve. Now that the court's loyalty is with the queen, Jason is Ariadne's last hope. He'll need all the help he can get if he and his friends are to save her life, but fortunately there are a few in Atlantis who remain loyal to the king. The battle lines are drawn in Atlantis once and for all but just as the odds seem stacked against Jason, a shocking revelation is made that exposes the past and changes the course of the future forever.

=== Series 2 (2014–15) ===
No. overall	No. in series	Title	Directed by	Written by	Original release date	UK viewers (millions) (Note: The ratings for the second part of the second series onward are the overnight ratings only; the final ratings are not available.)
Part 1
14	1	"A New Dawn: Part One"	Justin Molotnikov	Howard Overman	15 November 2014	5.32
After King Minos is dead and Pasiphae is banished, Ariadne is the Queen now. The town of Thera is under attack from Pasiphae and her army. Ariadne sends Jason, Hercules and Pythagoras to rescue Lord Sarpedon from Thera. Atlantis is protected by a small statue called Palladium kept in the treasure store. Medea, sent by Pasiphae and smuggled into Atlantis by Lord Sarpedon, steals the Palladium which causes some walls to crumble. Ariadne sends Jason, Hercules and Pythagoras to retrieve the Palladium from Pasiphae and her army before Atlantis falls.
15	2	"A New Dawn: Part Two"	Justin Molotnikov	Howard Overman	22 November 2014	4.67
Pasiphae moves the attack on Atlantis forward, but with their troops depleted, the city is all but lost without the return of Jason, Hercules and Pythagoras, who, having escaped from a cyclops in a maze of caves, are faced with the deserter army. Lord Sarpedon admits his deceit to Ariadne, but when he tries to atone for his sins he ends up paying the ultimate price. Hercules witnesses Pasiphae murder one of her own men to save Jason, and seeks answers from the Oracle, where he discovers the truth about Jason's birth.
16	3	"Telemon"	Justin Molotnikov	Richard McBrien	29 November 2014	4.65
After Ariadne is formally crowned as the queen of Atlantis, Pasiphae still remains uncaptured, and Atlantis remains vulnerable due to the aftermath of the past battle. A mysterious stranger arrives in Atlantis by the name of Prince Telemon of Aegina. He seeks to win fame and Ariadne's heart in the Coronation Games, a gladiatorial combat in the arena. Telemon is revealed to be not quite what he seems and commits murder before ultimately losing the tournament to Jason. However, Ariadne accepts his proposal of marriage by the end.
17	4	"The Marriage of True Minds"	Declan O'Dwyer	Lucy Watkins	6 December 2014	4.49
Ariadne travels with her fiance and full entourage, including Jason and his friends, to Aegina to seek Telemon's father's approval of the engagement. Telemon, who is working for Pasiphae, betrays Ariadne but spares her life during an ambush by the Colcheans. He pays the ultimate price at Pasiphae's hands for this act. Meanwhile, Jason, Pythagoras, Hercules, Ariadne and a fatally wounded Dion are on the run from the Colcheans, meeting a group of travellers along the way. They end up sheltering in a necropolis; Ariadne shoots Pasiphae with an arrow and Pasiphae, Medea and Jason fall into a chasm.
18	5	"The Day of the Dead"	Declan O'Dwyer	Howard Overman	13 December 2014	4.68
A wounded Pasiphae uses her sorcery to summon an army of the undead, including recently dead characters, such as Dion, to attack the heroes and hinder their progress through the necropolis. Meanwhile, Jason and Medea are forced to work together in order to survive, and the two of them, along with Hercules, ultimately defeat the undead. However, even after working together and requiring Jason's trust as they did so, Medea fatally stabs Ariadne and betrays the heroes in the end, using the situation to her own purposes.
19	6	"The Grey Sisters"	Declan O'Dwyer	Howard Overman	20 December 2014	5.69
Jason, Pythagoras and Hercules travel to the temple of Hecate to retrieve Medea's blood to break the curse placed on Ariadne. Jason is forced to leave Hercules behind with Pythagoras and sneaks into the temple alone to confront Medea. He is able to retrieve some of Medea's blood in a vial, but is soon captured and imprisoned by Pasiphae. Pasiphae listens on as Jason speaks about how he believes his mother to be dead. Believing Jason to be a lost cause, Pasiphae orders that he be killed, but Jason is rescued, and is successful in saving Ariadne's life. Ariadne proposes marriage to Jason, and he accepts.
Part 2
20	7	"A Fate Worse Than Death"	Lawrence Gough	Howard Overman	11 April 2015	2.57
As news reaches Pasiphae that Jason has agreed to marry Ariadne, she fears that Atlantis and its throne will be lost to her forever. Ariadne and Jason seeks the gods' blessing for their marriage so that the people will accept it, and the Oracle finds that the omens are good. The release of this news threatens Pasiphae's position for power, so she kidnaps the Oracle, and jails her. The queen finds Medusa, and promises her with the ability to end her misery, but only once she turns the Oracle to stone. Melas, having been the betrayer, orders Jason's arrest for the murder of the Oracle.
21	8	"The Madness of Hercules"	Lawrence Gough	Richard McBrien	18 April 2015	2.58
Melas continues to betray Jason and Ariadne by ordering Jason's execution to save his daughter who is held hostage by Pasiphae. Hercules is captured and imprisoned after he attempts to free Jason, and Ariadne and her advisor Delmos attempt to follow in his footsteps, but they too are arrested by Cilix, another traitor to their cause. Hercules reasons with Medusa, begging her to reveal the truth of the Oracle's death for the wrongly-accused Jason. With those who threaten her position of power now in prison, Pasiphae takes the city and declares herself the ruler of the throne, with the army now hers.
22	9	"The Gorgon's Gaze"	Lawrence Gough	Julian Jones	25 April 2015	2.39
Ariadne is tortured by Pasiphae in an attempt to get her to voluntarily release her right for the throne, and declare Pasiphae as the true queen and ruler of the throne, as the gods have refused to recognize her as Atlantis' rightful ruler. With the help of Daedalus and his son Icarus, Pythagoras sneaks into the town and convinces Melas to help their cause by stealing Pandora's box. Medusa revives her original curse, and Jason enters Atlantis with her severed head to confront Pasiphae and save Ariadne. However, his plan goes awry once Pasiphae reveals the relationship that the two of them share.
23	10	"The Dying of the Light"	Justin Molotnikov	Lucy Watkins	2 May 2015	2.32
Jason, with his heart blackened by the knowledge of who his mother is, continues to be on the run with his friends, though his arrogance and harshness shocks them. Pythagoras learns that, after sneaking into Atlantis to consult with Melas, that Jason's father is the key to balancing the dark and light within him, and give him the love to counter Pasiphae's influence. Pythagoras locates Aeson, Jason's father, but they are attacked by soldiers before Aeson has the chance to speak to Jason. Medea arrives, and betrays the wishes of Pasiphae by coming to the aid of Jason.
24	11	"Kin"	Justin Molotnikov	Julian Jones	9 May 2015	2.63
It is revealed by Cassandra, the new Oracle, that the gods oppose the execution of Jason, and Pasiphae is relieved by this news after being reluctant to kill him herself. Instead, he is put into the arena to fight for his life. Mingling with the lepers that bore away the dead of the fights within the arena, Aeson takes the chance to talk to Jason and reveal himself as his father. The two of them escape to rejoin Hercules, Pythagoras and Ariadne, and Jason's darker side is balanced by the love of his father, making it all the harder for Jason when Aeson is mortally wounded and eventually dies in his arms.
25	12	"The Queen Must Die"	Julian Murphy	Howard Overman	16 May 2015	2.51
Double length finale. After breaking into the amphitheatre, Jason frees the prisoners so that they may fight alongside him in an attempt to regain Atlantis. However, after Icarus' betrayal, many of the prisoners are killed after they walk into an ambush. Hercules marries Jason and Ariadne in the forest, and Medea later informs Jason in secret how to kill Pasiphae once and for all. Jason heeds her advice, and after returning to Atlantis as King and with Ariadne by his side as Queen, they become aware that there are still those who wish to thwart them. Through the power of sorcery, Pasiphae is resurrected and, with her mind now as black as her heart, she again takes the throne and completely subjugates the city, forcing Jason and his friends to hide once more. Jason realizes, as does Cassandra through a vision, that to finally bring the Dark Queen down, he must take on one last adventure, for which Medea awaits him on a distant shore.

== Production ==
Announced on 11 February 2013, Atlantis was created to fill the gap left behind by Merlin, a show that was created and produced by Johnny Capps and Julian Murphy. This duo, plus Misfits creator Howard Overman, produced Atlantis through their new company Urban Myth Films. Executive producer for BBC Cymru Wales was Bethan Jones. The drama series was commissioned by Ben Stephenson, Controller of BBC Drama, and Danny Cohen, Controller of BBC One. The cast was announced on 27 March 2013.

The series was filmed in Wales and Morocco. A 155,000sq ft warehouse, a former cold store building near Chepstow, was converted into a vast TV studio to house the sets and filming of Atlantis. The first series was filmed between 1 April 2013 and 1 November 2013.

On 22 July 2013, BBC America announced that the channel was co-producing Atlantis, and the show was broadcast in the US in autumn 2013 as part of "Supernatural Saturday." Since that date the series was promoted using a viral marketing campaign, with official accounts on Twitter, Tumblr and Facebook. On 9 August 2013, the first poster for the series was revealed, and on 16 August 2013 the first teaser trailer for the series aired on BBC One. A week later on 23 August, a second teaser was shown where Jason (Jack Donnelly) appeared. On 29 August four new teasers were released featuring Jack Donnelly, Juliet Stevenson, Mark Addy and Robert Emms. On 7 September the first promotional pictures of the cast were revealed and on the same day, the first trailer for the series was aired before Strictly Come Dancing on BBC One. A week before the first episode, on 21 September, the first clip from the opening episode was released.

On 26 October 2013, the BBC confirmed that a second series had been commissioned. The second series had its initial read-through on 11 March 2014, with filming taking place from 17 March 2014 to 10 October 2014. On 3 April 2014, it was announced that Vincent Regan was joining the cast as Dion along with Amy Manson as Medea.Clive Standen, known from Vikings, guest-starred in an episode of the second series. Emmett J. Scanlan, known from Hollyoaks, revealed on his Instagram page that he was joining the second series.

== Soundtrack ==
In December 2015, Silva Screen Records released the soundtrack to the second series on CD and digital download. Composed by Stuart Hancock, the album features 30 tracks and 73 minutes of music score, with the final track, entitled 'Vision of the Future', incorporating Rob Lane's original series title theme. Reviewing this soundtrack release in Synchrotones, Pete Simons wrote "Stuart Hancock's Atlantis is a magnificent work... What is impressive about Atlantis is its big cinematic feel; along with its large orchestral performance...the score sounds vibrant and exciting in a way that many similar scores don't."

== Broadcast ==
On 4 October 2014, the first teaser trailer for the second series was released, followed by the first official trailer on 29 October 2014. It premiered on 15 November 2014.

In Canada, the series airs on Space, premiering 12 October 2013, with the second series returning 15 November 2014. In the United States, the series premiered on 23 November 2013 on BBC America, with the second series returning 15 November 2014. BBCA aired the remaining six episodes of the cancelled series in June and July 2015 with the last episode, "The Queen Must Die," airing on 8 August 2015. In Australia, the series aired on Fox8. It was originally set to premiere on 30 March 2014, but did not premiere until 4 May 2014.

The second series was set to return on 26 April 2015, however, it was postponed until late 2015. In January 2015, the BBC confirmed that the third series, which would have been inspired by Jason and the Argonauts, was not to be commissioned, and on 16 May 2015, the series ended.

In the U.K., the series has been made available on BBC iPlayer and has reaired on Sky Sci-Fi. In the U.S. it has been made available on streaming platforms like Amazon Prime Video, Hulu, and The Roku Channel.
