= London Has Fallen =

2016 film by Babak Najafi

- Theatrical release poster
- Directed by: Babak Najafi
- Screenplay by: Creighton Rothenberger; Katrin Benedikt; Christian Gudegast; Chad St. John
- Story by: Creighton Rothenberger; Katrin Benedikt
- Based on: Characters by: Creighton Rothenberger; Katrin Benedikt
- Produced by: Gerard Butler; Alan Siegel; Mark Gill; John Thompson; Matt O'Toole; Les Weldon
- Starring: Gerard Butler; Aaron Eckhart; Morgan Freeman; Alon Moni Aboutboul; Angela Bassett; Robert Forster; Jackie Earle Haley; Melissa Leo; Radha Mitchell; Sean O'Bryan; Waleed Zuaiter
- Cinematography: Ed Wild
- Edited by: Paul Martin Smith; Michael Duthie
- Music by: Trevor Morris
- Production companies: Millennium Films; G-BASE
- Distributed by: Focus Features (through Gramercy Pictures; United States); Lionsgate (United Kingdom); Universum Film (Germany); Bontonfilm (Czech Republic)
- Release dates: March 1, 2016 (Hollywood); March 4, 2016 (United States and United Kingdom); March 10, 2016 (Germany); July 4, 2016 (Czech Republic)
- Running time: 99 minutes
- Countries: United States; United Kingdom; Germany; Czech Republic
- Language: English
- Budget: $60 million
- Box office: $205.9 million

London Has Fallen is a 2016 political action thriller film directed by Babak Najafi and written by Creighton Rothenberger, Katrin Benedikt, Chad St. John, and Christian Gudegast. It is the sequel to Olympus Has Fallen (2013) and second installment in the Has Fallen film series, and stars Gerard Butler, Aaron Eckhart, and Morgan Freeman, with Alon Moni Aboutboul, Angela Bassett, Robert Forster, Jackie Earle Haley, Melissa Leo, Radha Mitchell, Sean O'Bryan, and Waleed Zuaiter in supporting roles.

In the film, Secret Service agent Mike Banning must protect United States President Benjamin Asher from terrorists who orchestrated a threat against the G7 during the British Prime Minister's funeral in London.

Filming began in London on October 24, 2014. The film was released in the United States by Focus Features under their recently revived Gramercy Pictures label on March 4, 2016. It received negative reviews but grossed $205.9 million worldwide, making it the highest grossing movie of the Has Fallen franchise.

A third film, titled Angel Has Fallen, was released on August 23, 2019.

== Plot ==
G8 intelligence services locate Pakistani arms trafficker and terrorist mastermind Aamir Barkawi at his compound and authorize a drone strike during his daughter's wedding, killing Barkawi's family and presumably Barkawi himself.

Two years later, the British Prime Minister James Wilson has suddenly died, and the G7 leaders prepare to attend his funeral in London. Secret Service Director Lynne Jacobs assigns Agent Mike Banning to lead U.S. President Benjamin Asher's overseas security detail, although Banning's wife Leah is shortly to give birth. Air Force One lands at Stansted Airport, and Banning arranges an earlier arrival at Somerset House in London via Marine One.

As Asher's Presidential car arrives at St Paul's Cathedral, an army of mercenaries led by Barkawi's son Kamran launch coordinated attacks on the city. They are disguised as Metropolitan Police, the Queen's Guardsmen, and other first responders, killing the leaders of Canada, Germany, Japan, Italy, and France. They damage major landmarks and generate mass panic.

Asher's early arrival throws off the St. Paul's attack, and Banning returns Asher and Jacobs to Marine One. Islamic terrorists with Stinger missiles force a crash landing in Hyde Park, killing Jacobs. Banning escorts Asher into the London Underground as the city's power is lost and residents shelter indoors.

In Washington, D.C., Vice President Allan Trumbull investigates the incident with British authorities while trying to track down Asher. He receives a call from Barkawi, still alive and in Sanaa. Seeking revenge for the drone strike that killed his daughter and having poisoned Wilson to lure the G7 leaders to London, Barkawi promises to livestream Asher's execution when Kamran captures him.

Trumbull orders his staff to locate Barkawi's businesses to find any connection to the attack, while British authorities stand down all first responders so those left in the open can be identified as terrorists. After leaving a sign to be picked up by satellite, Banning leads Asher to a safe-house, where MI6 Agent Jacquelin Marshall briefs them. Marshall receives a voice message from Trumbull that they saw Banning's sign, and an extraction team is en route.

Security monitors display an approaching Delta Force team, but Banning realizes they are actually Barkawi's men. He kills them all and drives away with Asher, but their car is struck before they can reach the U.S. Embassy, and Asher is taken. Banning is rescued by an SAS extraction team, who suspect a mole in the British government.

Trumbull's staff identify a building owned by one of Barkawi's front companies, drawing massive power despite being seemingly unoccupied, and deduces it as Kamran's headquarters. Banning infiltrates it seconds before Kamran can kill Asher on live coverage. Kamran escapes when his brother, Sultan Mansoor, drops a grenade before being killed, forcing Banning to protect Asher from the blast.

They escape just before the building is destroyed by the SAS, using an explosive Banning had planted earlier, killing Kamran and the remaining terrorists. Marshall helps British authorities restore London's security system and, discovering that MI5 Intelligence Chief John Lancaster is Barkawi's mole, kills Lancaster when he resists arrest. Trumbull tells Barkawi that his plan failed, moments before another drone strike kills him.

Two weeks later, as London recovers, Banning is home with Leah and their newborn child Lynne, named after Jacobs. As he drafts a resignation letter, he watches Trumbull speak on television about recent events. Inspired, Banning deletes the letter.

== Cast ==
- Gerard Butler as Secret Service Agent and former Army Ranger RRC Mike Banning
- Aaron Eckhart as President Benjamin Asher
- Morgan Freeman as Vice President Allan Trumbull
- Alon Moni Aboutboul as Aamir Barkawi, a Pakistani international arms trafficker and terrorist mastermind who is No. 6 on the FBI's 10 Most Wanted list
- Angela Bassett as Secret Service Director Lynne Jacobs
- Robert Forster as United States Army General Edward Clegg, Chairman of the Joint Chiefs of Staff
- Jackie Earle Haley as White House Deputy Chief of Staff DC Mason
- Melissa Leo as Defense Secretary Ruth McMillan
- Radha Mitchell as Leah Banning, Mike's wife
- Sean O'Bryan as NSA Deputy Director Ray Monroe
- Waleed Zuaiter as Kamran Barkawi, Aamir's son and sub-commander
- Charlotte Riley as MI6 Agent Jacquelin "Jax" Marshall
- Colin Salmon as Sir Kevin Hazard, Commissioner (credited as "Chief") of the Metropolitan Police
- Bryan Larkin as SAS Commander Will Davies
- Patrick Kennedy as MI5 Counter-Intelligence Chief John Lancaster
- Mehdi Dehbi as Sultan Mansoor, the terrorist hacker
- Adel Bencherif as Raza Mansoor, Sultan's brother and a terrorist
- Michael Wildman as Secret Service Agent Voight
- Andrew Pleavin as Secret Service Agent Bronson
- Deborah Grant as Doris, Leah's mother
- Clarkson Guy Williams as British Prime Minister Leighton Clarkson
- Penny Downie as Home Secretary Rose Kenter
- Philip Delancy as French President Jacques Mainard, who is killed by a Thames cargo barge planted with explosives.
- Alex Giannini as Italian Prime Minister Antonio Gusto, who is killed by an explosion at Westminster Abbey. It was Giannini's last movie role before his death on October 2, 2015.
- Elsa Mollien as Viviana Gusto, Antonio Gusto's wife
- Nancy Baldwin as German Chancellor Agnes Bruckner, who is killed by Islamic terrorists disguised as royal guards at Buckingham Palace.
- Nigel Whitmey as Canadian Prime Minister Robert Bowman, who is killed by a bomb planted under his limousine as it passes Trafalgar Square.
- Julia Montgomery Brown as Mrs Bowman, Robert Bowman's wife
- Tsuwayuki Saotome as Japanese Prime Minister Tsutomu Nakushima, who is killed when the Chelsea Bridge is destroyed while his car is sitting in traffic.

In addition, the MSNBC news anchor Lawrence O'Donnell appears, uncredited, as an unnamed news anchor reporting on the developments in London, reprising his role from the first film.

== Production ==
=== Casting ===
In October 2013, it was announced that Butler, Eckhart, Freeman, Bassett, Leo, Forster and Mitchell would reprise their roles from Olympus Has Fallen. Production had been scheduled to begin in May 2015 in London, with Creighton Rothenberger and Katrin Benedikt returning to write the script. Director Antoine Fuqua, however, did not return, due to his commitments with The Equalizer. On May 1, 2014, it was announced Focus Features had acquired distribution rights to the sequel, and would release the film on October 2, 2015. On August 18, 2014, it was announced that Charlie Countryman director Fredrik Bond would take over direction from Fuqua, but Bond left the film on September 18, six weeks before the shooting was to begin. On September 28, director Babak Najafi signed on to direct the film. On October 10, Jackie Earle Haley joined the film to play Deputy Chief Mason. On November 4, 2014, in a press release confirming that filming had started, it was also confirmed that Sean O'Bryan was reprising his role from the first film, while Alon Aboutboul, Charlotte Riley and Waleed Zuaiter were also in the cast. On November 12, Mehdi Dehbi joined the film to play Sultan Mansoor, the youngest of three brothers whose life has been forever changed after a drone strike. Scotsman Bryan Larkin, who plays SAS Commander Will Davies, joined the cast as a "posh English guy", but Najafi and Butler made an on-set decision to have him use his natural Scottish accent.

=== Filming ===
Principal photography began on October 24, 2014, in London. Four weeks of shooting were to take place, involving actors Freeman, Eckhart, Bassett and Melissa Leo, before a break for Christmas. Butler and Angela Bassett were seen filming in Somerset House. Production also took place at Pinewood Studios. Butler stated in an interview that the movie was also filmed in India and was to continue in Bulgaria. Then President of Bulgaria, Rosen Plevneliev, visited the set of London Has Fallen during filming at the Boyana Film Studios in Bulgaria. Filming lasted through April 2015.

=== Score ===
The music was composed and conducted by Trevor Morris, who provided the score for the first film. The record was released on March 4, 2016, by Back Lot Music. The score was recorded at Abbey Road Studios with The Chamber Orchestra of London.

London Has Fallen (Original Motion Picture Soundtrack)
No.	Title	Length
1.	"London Has Fallen"	1:58
2.	"Spotting Barkawi"	2:25
3.	"Bourbon and Poor Choices"	1:17
4.	"Nursery"	0:49
5.	"Scotland Yard"	0:57
6.	"President Arrives in the UK"	0:49
7.	"Motorcade / Marine One Lands"	1:44
8.	"London Attacked"	4:53
9.	"London Goes Dark"	1:49
10.	"Marine One Crash"	3:20
11.	"Jacob's Death"	1:42
12.	"Not Much of a Talker"	1:57
13.	"How Bad Is It?"	1:03
14.	"I'm Not Going to Die on YouTube"	9:04
15.	"Don't Jinx Me"	4:04
16.	"Right Under Our Noses"	3:51
17.	"Rescuing Asher"	12:30
18.	"Hand Fight and Hand Grenade"	1:59
19.	"Let's Get Outta Here"	1:41
20.	"I Hate Funerals"	1:18
21.	"Traitor"	2:12
22.	"Reciprocity"	1:44
23.	"Resignation Letter"	0:50
24.	"End Titles / Credits"	1:26
Total length:		52:00

== Release ==
On May 20, 2015, Focus Features relaunched their Gramercy Pictures label for action, horror, and science fiction releases, with London Has Fallen being one of Gramercy's first titles. The film was planned for an October 2, 2015 release; however, on June 12, 2015, it was announced that the film had been moved back to January 22, 2016, to avoid competition with The Martian, which swapped its original November 25 release date with Victor Frankenstein. The timing of the release was criticized as "insensitive" by the Chair of the Tavistock Square Memorial Trust, Philip Nelson, as it coincided with the week of the 10th anniversary of the 7 July 2005 London bombings, in which 52 people were killed, and with the 2015 Sousse attacks, in which 30 British nationals were killed. On September 16, 2015, the film's release was moved back again to March 4, 2016, because the studios needed more time to finish the film's visual effects.

== Home media ==
London Has Fallen was released on Blu-ray and DVD on June 14, 2016.

== Reception ==
=== Box office ===
London Has Fallen grossed $62.7 million in North America and $143.2 million in other territories for a worldwide total of $205.8 million, against a budget of $60 million. The film outgrossed its predecessor's total of $170 million.

In the United States and Canada, pre-release tracking suggested the film would gross $20–23 million from 3,490 theaters in its opening weekend, alongside Zootopia and Whiskey Tango Foxtrot. The film made $850,000 from its Thursday night previews and $7.6 million on its first day. It went on to gross $21.6 million in its opening weekend, finishing second at the box office behind Zootopia ($75 million).

=== Critical response ===
On Rotten Tomatoes, the film has an approval rating of 28% based on 196 reviews, with an average rating of 4.2/10. The site's critical consensus reads, "London Has Fallen traps a talented cast—and all who dare to see it—in a mid-1990s basic-cable nightmare of a film loaded with xenophobia and threadbare action-thriller clichés." On Metacritic, the film has a score of 28 out of 100, based on reviews from 35 critics, indicating "generally unfavorable" reviews. Audiences polled by CinemaScore gave the film an average grade of "A−" on an A+ to F scale, the same score as the first film.

Ignatiy Vishnevetsky of The A.V. Club wrote: "A murky, brain-dead stab-a-thon packed with so many inane chases, laughable special effects, and mismatched stock footage shots that it begs to be made into a drinking game, London Has Fallen is one of those rare films that is good at absolutely nothing." The A.V. Club later picked it as their worst film of the year.

The Hollywood Reporter mentioned that "Butler manfully dispenses justice here many times over, and even if the other main actors are in it strictly for the paycheck, they’ve all been in a whole lot worse in their time".

=== Controversy ===
Variety described London Has Fallen as "effortlessly racist" invoking "familiar Islamophobia", a "terrorsploitation" fantasy designed to spread fear after the November 2015 Paris attacks, and "ugly, reactionary fear-mongering." Meanwhile, The Hollywood Reporter styled it as "major world capitals destruction porn sub-genre".

The film has been called "extremely insensitive" by families of the victims of the 7/7 bombings after an early trailer was released ahead of the 10th anniversary of the attacks.

== Sequel ==
On October 26, 2016, it was announced that a sequel titled Angel Has Fallen was in development, with Gerard Butler reprising his role, as well as once again acting as a producer on the film.

On July 25, 2017, Ric Roman Waugh was announced as director for Angel Has Fallen. On January 10, 2018, Holt McCallany joined the cast as Wade Jennings, an ex-military turned head of a technology company, but was replaced later by Danny Huston. On January 18, 2018, Jada Pinkett Smith and Tim Blake Nelson were confirmed to appear in Angel Has Fallen. On February 13, 2018, Piper Perabo joined the cast. Filming started on February 7, 2018 in Virginia Water Lake.

The film was released on August 23, 2019.

== See also ==
- List of fictional prime ministers of the United Kingdom
