= Killer Kid =

- Directed by: Gilles de Maistre
- Screenplay by: Miguel Courtois; Gilles de Maistre
- Based on: Killer Kid by Claude Klotz
- Produced by: Jean-François Lepetit
- Starring: Tewfik Jallab; Younesse Boudache
- Cinematography: Jean-Bernard Aurouet
- Edited by: Robert Coursez
- Music by: René Aubry
- Production company: Flach Film
- Distributed by: AFMD
- Release date: 22 June 1994
- Running time: 90 minutes
- Country: France
- Language: French

Killer Kid is a 1994 French drama film directed by Gilles de Maistre, starring Tewfik Jallab and Younesse Boudache.

== Plot ==
Two 11-year-old Arab boys become acquainted in France. One was raised in Lebanon, where he was trained to kill efficiently and sent on a mission to commit a murder. The other was raised in France by an immigrant family and lives a life dominated by pop culture. The former comes to regard the latter as his role model.

== Production ==
Killer Kid is based on the 1989 novel of the same name by Claude Klotz. It was the director Gilles de Maistre's first fiction film, after having made several documentaries.

== Reception ==
The film was shown in the Cannes Junior sidebar of the 1994 Cannes Film Festival, where it won the Jury Prize and Grand Prix du Public. It was released in France on 22 June 1994.

Lisa Nesselson of Variety said that the story is propelled by a documentary-like filming style and that the musical score has a "sinister verve", calling it a "harsh but engaging" non-political film about fanaticism.
