= John Marrs (author) =

British novelist and former journalist

- Occupations: Novelist, former journalist
- Writing career
- Period: 2010s–present
- Genres: Psychological thriller, speculative fiction
- Notable works: The One, The Passengers, Keep it in the family

John Marrs is a British author of psychological thrillers and speculative fiction, and a former journalist. He is best known for the novel The One, which was adapted into an eight‑part Netflix television series, and for a sequence of standalone near‑future novels set in the same fictional universe.

== Early life and journalism career ==
Marrs is from Northamptonshire, England, and has been based in both London and Northamptonshire. Before becoming a full‑time writer, he worked for around two decades as a freelance journalist, interviewing film, television and music celebrities for British national newspapers and magazines. His work has appeared in outlets including The Guardian and Guardian Online, OK! Magazine, Total Film, Empire, Q, The Independent and the Daily Star.

== Writing career ==
Marrs has described himself as a lifelong reader who turned to fiction writing in his early forties while still working as a journalist. He later left journalism to become a full‑time novelist. Marrs began writing fiction while commuting by train and initially self‑published his early novels after rejections from literary agents and publishers. His debut novel, originally published independently as The Wronged Sons in 2013 and later reissued as When You Disappeared, was acquired by publisher Thomas & Mercer following its self‑published success.

He subsequently signed publishing deals for psychological thrillers with Amazon imprint Thomas & Mercer and for speculative fiction with Ebury, an imprint of Penguin Random House. Marrs's work is often described as falling into two strands: psychological thrillers, including When You Disappeared, The Good Samaritan, What Lies Between Us, Keep It in the Family, The Stranger in Her House and You Killed Me First; and near‑future speculative or dystopian novels such as The One, The Passengers, The Minders, The Marriage Act and The Family Experiment. Although several of the speculative novels share a universe and overlapping concepts, his books are generally marketed as standalones rather than as a traditional series.

Marrs has spoken about using high‑concept premises that explore ethical questions around technology, surveillance and personal freedom, while maintaining the pacing and twists of psychological thrillers.

== Adaptations ==
The One has sold more than one million copies worldwide and has been translated into multiple languages. In 2021 it was adapted into an eight‑episode Netflix television series, which expanded the novel's premise of DNA‑based matchmaking into a serialized drama.

== Themes and style ==
Commentators have noted that Marrs's speculative novels frequently focus on near‑future technologies and their social consequences, often involving state or corporate control and the erosion of privacy. His thrillers are known for morally ambiguous characters, multiple viewpoints and twist‑driven plots that explore darker aspects of family life and relationships. Reviews of The One and later works have highlighted his use of short, cliffhanger chapters and intertwined storylines to maintain suspense.

== Reception ==
The One received generally positive reviews for its blend of speculative premise and thriller pacing, with Kirkus Reviews calling it "engrossing" and praising its exploration of the darker side of soulmate technology. The novel has developed a strong readership, reflected in substantial ratings and discussion on reader platforms. Later works such as The Passengers, The Minders and The Marriage Act have also been reviewed in crime and genre‑fiction outlets, which have noted Marrs's focus on moral dilemmas and social commentary.

== Bibliography ==
=== Psychological thrillers ===
- The Wronged Sons (2013); reissued as When You Disappeared
- Welcome to Wherever You Are (2015); later reissued as The Vacation
- The Good Samaritan (2017)
- Her Last Move (2018)
- What Lies Between Us (2020)
- Keep It in the Family (2022)
- The Stranger in Her House (2024)
- You Killed Me First (2025)
- Dead in the Water (forthcoming 2026)

=== "One" universe / dark future novels ===
- The One (2016)
- The Passengers (2019)
- The Minders (2020)
- The Marriage Act (2023)
- The Family Experiment (2024)
