= Olympus Has Fallen =

2013 American action thriller film directed by Antoine Fuqua

- Theatrical release poster
- Directed by: Antoine Fuqua
- Written by: Creighton Rothenberger; Katrin Benedikt
- Produced by: Antoine Fuqua; Gerard Butler; Alan Siegel; Ed Cathell III; Danny Lerner; Mark Gill
- Starring: Gerard Butler; Aaron Eckhart; Morgan Freeman; Angela Bassett; Robert Forster; Cole Hauser; Finley Jacobsen; Ashley Judd; Melissa Leo; Dylan McDermott; Radha Mitchell; Rick Yune
- Cinematography: Conrad W. Hall
- Edited by: John Refoua
- Music by: Trevor Morris
- Production companies: Millennium Films; G-BASE
- Distributed by: FilmDistrict
- Release dates: March 18, 2013 (Hollywood); March 22, 2013 (United States)
- Running time: 119 minutes
- Country: United States
- Language: English
- Budget: $70 million
- Box office: $170.3 million

Olympus Has Fallen is a 2013 American political action thriller film directed and co-produced by Antoine Fuqua from a screenplay written by Creighton Rothenberger and Katrin Benedikt, and is the first installment in the Has Fallen film series. The film stars Gerard Butler (who also co-produced), Aaron Eckhart, and Morgan Freeman with Angela Bassett, Robert Forster, Cole Hauser, Ashley Judd, Melissa Leo, Dylan McDermott, Radha Mitchell, and Rick Yune in supporting roles.

The plot depicts a North Korean–led guerrilla assault on the White House, and focuses on disgraced Secret Service agent Mike Banning's efforts to rescue U.S. president Benjamin Asher.

The film was released in the United States on March 22, 2013, by FilmDistrict, and grossed $170 million against a $70 million production budget. The film received mixed reviews from critics, who praised Fuqua's direction, action sequences and Butler's performance, but criticized the overt violence and the screenplay. Olympus Has Fallen was one of two 2013 films that depicted a terrorist attack against the White House; the other was White House Down, which was released three months later and underperformed.

A sequel, titled London Has Fallen, was released on March 4, 2016, with the principal cast members reprising their roles. A third film, Angel Has Fallen, was released on August 23, 2019.

== Plot ==
Mike Banning, a former U.S. Army Ranger, serves as a Secret Service agent in the Presidential Protective Division. He cultivates a warm, personal bond with President Benjamin Asher, First Lady Margaret, and their son, Connor. During a snowy drive, the presidential state car loses control on a bridge. Banning manages to rescue President Asher, but the limousine falls off the bridge, killing Margaret.

Eighteen months later, Banning finds himself removed and demoted from the presidential detail and assigned to the Treasury Department.

At the White House, President Asher's meeting with South Korean Prime Minister Lee Tae-Woo is interrupted when independent North Korean terrorists, under the command of Kang Yeonsak, launch a coordinated assault, aiming to seize control of the building. Aided by ex-Secret Service agent-turned-private security contractor Dave Forbes, they hold Asher and several top officials hostage in the Presidential Emergency Operations Center, executing Lee on live video for the world to witness their power. Before being killed, Agent Roma alerts the Pentagon that "Olympus has fallen."

Banning joins the initial defense before entering the White House. He disables its surveillance systems, and using Asher's satellite earphone, he establishes communication with Secret Service director Lynne Jacobs and Speaker of the House Allan Trumbull. The acting president is there managing operations in the Pentagon's emergency briefing room.

Kang, leveraging with Asher's captivity, demands Trumbull withdraw U.S. forces from South Korea. His ultimate goal is to detonate the American nuclear arsenal, transforming North America into a radioactive wasteland as retribution for his mother's death, by accessing the Cerberus system, the nuclear abortion fail-safe, which requires codes held only by Asher, Secretary of Defense Ruth McMillan, and Chairman of the Joint Chiefs Admiral Joseph Hoenig. Asher urges McMillan and Hoenig to disclose their codes to save lives, confident in his resolve to resist.

After finding Connor concealed within the building's walls, Banning takes him to safety, thwarting Kang's scheme to coerce Asher into divulging his code. Banning kills numerous commandos, including Forbes. Army Chief of Staff general Edward Clegg persuades Trumbull to sanction an aerial assault on the White House. However, the terrorists intercept and annihilate the attack force with their advanced Hydra 6 anti-aircraft system before Mike destroys the guns with an RPG. In response, Kang executes Vice President Charlie Rodriguez.

Banning shuts down Kang's communication network, forcing Kang to expose his operatives so he can execute McMillan publicly in retaliation for Banning's action. Banning ambushes them, resulting in heavy losses for Kang. With their numbers dwindling, Kang stages his and Asher's apparent deaths in a suicide helicopter explosion, sacrificing both his commandos and hostages to conceal their escape.

Banning deduces the ploy and heads to the bunker. With two codes secured, Kang solves Asher's code and triggers Cerberus before attempting to escape with Asher. Banning bursts in, and after killing the remaining terrorists, he kills Kang by stabbing his head with a knife. Finally, with Trumbull's aid, Banning deactivates Cerberus with just seconds to spare.

Following the White House recapture, Banning escorts Asher to safety. Subsequently, Banning resumes his role as head of presidential security. Asher addresses the nation, acknowledging the attack's effect and pledging America's ongoing resilience.

== Cast ==
- Gerard Butler as Mike Banning, Secret Service agent and former Army Ranger RRC
- Aaron Eckhart as Benjamin Asher, President of the United States
- Morgan Freeman as Allan Trumbull, Speaker of the House
- Rick Yune as Kang Yeonsak, a North Korean ultra-nationalist mastermind disguised as a South Korean ministerial aide
- Angela Bassett as Lynne Jacobs, Director of the Secret Service
- Robert Forster as General Edward Clegg, Chief of Staff of the United States Army
- Cole Hauser as Agent Roma, United States Secret Service agent in charge
- Finley Jacobsen as Connor Asher, son of Benjamin and Margaret Asher
- Ashley Judd as Margaret Asher, First Lady of the United States
- Melissa Leo as Ruth McMillan, Secretary of Defense
- Dylan McDermott as Dave Forbes, a former Secret Service agent now working for the Prime Minister of South Korea's security detail.
- Radha Mitchell as Leah Banning, a nurse and Mike's wife
- Sean O'Bryan as Ray Monroe, Deputy Director of the National Security Agency
- Lance Broadway as Agent O'Neil, member of the president's Secret Service security detail
- Tory Kittles as Agent Jones, member of the president's Secret Service security detail
- Keong Sim as Lee Tae-Woo, Prime Minister of South Korea
- Phil Austin as Charlie Rodriguez, Vice President of the United States
- James Ingersoll as Admiral Joe Hoenig, Chairman of the Joint Chiefs of Staff
- Freddy Bosche as Mark Diaz, United States Secret Service agent
- Kevin Moon as Cho, Kang's henchman
- Malana Lea as Lim, Kang's henchwoman and technical expert
- Sam Medina as Yu, Kang's henchman

In addition, the MSNBC news anchor Lawrence O'Donnell appears, uncredited, as an unnamed news anchor reporting on the developments in Washington, DC

== Production ==
Olympus Has Fallen was directed by Antoine Fuqua, based on a script by Creighton Rothenberger and Katrin Benedikt in their first screenwriting effort. The production company Millennium Films acquired the spec script in March 2012, and Gerard Butler was cast later in the month as the star of the film. The rest of the characters were cast throughout June and July.

In 2012, Millennium Films competed against Sony Pictures, which was producing White House Down (a twin film about a takeover of the White House) to complete casting and begin filming.

Filming began in Shreveport, Louisiana, in mid-July 2012. Because Olympus Has Fallen was filmed so far from its actual setting of Washington, DC, the entire production relied heavily upon visual effects, particularly computer-generated imagery. For example, computers were used to create nearly all of the opening sequence in which the First Lady is killed in a car accident, with chroma key greenscreen technology used to composite the actors into the computer-generated snowy scenery. For scenes where actors walked in or out of the White House, a first-floor façade and entrance were built; computers added the second floor, roof, and downtown DC cityscape. Action scenes with the White House in the background were filmed in open fields and the White House and DC were added in post-production.

== Score ==
The score was composed by Trevor Morris whose past projects included The Tudors and The Borgias. The score was recorded at Trevor Morris Studios in Santa Monica with the Bratislava Slovak National Orchestra.

The record was released on March 15, 2013, via Relativity Music Group label.

Olympus Has Fallen (Music from the Motion Picture)
No.	Title	Length
1.	"Land of the Free"	1:42
2.	"The Full Package / Snowy Car Talk"	2:00
3.	"Stage Coach Crashes / Death of the First Lady"	2:38
4.	"Rocky Road Ice Cream"	1:16
5.	"White House: Air Attack"	7:10
6.	"White House: Ground Attack"	10:02
7.	"Olympus Has Fallen"	2:00
8.	"P.E.O.C. Incarceration"	2:21
9.	"Banning Steps Into Action"	1:40
10.	"Triage"	0:54
11.	"Banning Gathers Intelligence"	5:10
12.	"Hunting Banning"	2:05
13.	"He's in the Walls"	1:09
14.	"Saving Spark Plug"	3:52
15.	"Breaking Madam Secretary"	2:49
16.	"How Do You Know Kang's Name?"	2:16
17.	"Any Regrets"	1:11
18.	"S.E.A.L. Helicopter Incursion"	4:45
19.	"Walking the Plank"	3:11
20.	"Pulling the Fleet"	1:24
21.	"Mano e Mano"	2:13
22.	"Stopping Cerberus"	2:24
23.	"Day Break / We Will Rise / End Credits"	5:06
Total length:		69:00

== Release ==
Olympus Has Fallen was released in the United States on March 22, 2013. It was initially scheduled for an April 5, 2013 release, but moved to avoid competition with The Heat, which was to open at the same time (its release was later pushed back to June 28). FilmDistrict distributed the film.

The film's trailer was criticized for using the Emergency Alert System, and several cable companies were fined by the Federal Communications Commission for airing the ad.

== Home media ==
The film was released to home video in the United States on DVD and Blu-ray formats on August 13, 2013. It earned $38.2 million in video rental sales in the U.S.

== Controversies ==
=== Authorship dispute ===
A lawsuit was filed in 2013 by Creighton Rothenberger seeking a declaration that John S Green was not the source of the film's characters and material. Green countersued, seeking a declaration that he was the sole author. The case was eventually settled for $175,000, with Rothenberger retaining the rights to the film. Green was subsequently sued by his former wife, Jessica Bausch, for half of the settlement money, claiming entitlement to the script's proceeds based on their divorce agreement. In 2018, the Pennsylvania Superior Court ruled in Bausch's favor.

=== Butler lawsuit ===
In July 2021, star/producer Gerard Butler sued Nu Image/Millennium Films for $10 million, claiming that the company had understated the film's domestic gross by $17.5 million, as well as failed to report $8 million that went to its own executives. Butler's contract had entitled him to 10% of net profits. The lawsuit settled in 2023 for an undisclosed amount.

== Reception ==
=== Box office ===
Olympus Has Fallen grossed $98.9 million in the U.S. and Canada, and $71.3 million in other territories, for a worldwide total of $170.2 million, against a budget of $70 million.

In its first weekend the film grossed $30.5 million, finishing second at the box office and exceeded predictions of $23 million.

=== Critical response ===
Review aggregator website Rotten Tomatoes reports the film has an approval rating of 49% based on 198 reviews, and an average rating of 5.40/10. The site's critical consensus reads, "It's far from original, but Olympus Has Fallen benefits from Antoine Fuqua's tense direction and a strong performance from Gerard Butler—which might be just enough for action junkies." Metacritic assigns the film a weighted average score of 41 out of 100 based on 30 critics, indicating "mixed or average reviews". Audiences polled by CinemaScore gave the film a grade of "A−" on an A+ to F scale.

Katey Rich of CinemaBlend praised the "lean low-budget approach", and called the film "both captivating and queasy". Richard Roeper gave the film a C, calling it "just too much of a pale Die Hard ripoff". David Edelstein was more negative; while praising Butler's role as a "solid" character, he criticized the script and the violence, writing "Olympus Has Fallen is a disgusting piece of work, but it certainly hits its marks—it makes you sick with suspense".

== Sequels ==
Gerard Butler, Morgan Freeman, Aaron Eckhart, Angela Bassett and Radha Mitchell returned for a sequel titled London Has Fallen revolving around a major Islamic terrorist strike on London during the funeral of the British Prime Minister. Production was scheduled to begin in May 2014 in London, with Creighton Rothenberger and Katrin Benedikt returning to write the script. Director Antoine Fuqua did not return, due to his commitments to The Equalizer.

On May 1, 2014, it was announced that Focus Features had acquired distribution rights to the sequel and would release it on October 2, 2015, though this was later pushed back to January 22, 2016. However, the film's release was delayed to March 4, 2016. On August 18, 2014, it was announced that Fredrik Bond would direct, but he left the film on September 18, just six weeks before shooting was set to begin. On September 28, it was announced that Babak Najafi would direct. On October 10, 2014, it was announced that Jackie Earle Haley would join the cast. Filming for the sequel began on October 24, 2014. The film was released on March 4, 2016.

A third installment, Angel Has Fallen, was released on August 23, 2019, focused on a second attempt on the life of President Trumbull (Morgan Freeman), with agent Banning (Gerard Butler) framed for the attack.

== See also ==
- White House Down
