= Paradise Beach (film) =

2019 French action thriller film

- French theatrical release poster
- Directed by: Xavier Durringer
- Written by: Xavier Durringer; Jean Miez
- Produced by: Isaac Sharry; Philippe Aigle; Séverine Lathuillière; Bruno Petit
- Starring: Sami Bouajila; Tewfik Jallab; Mélanie Doutey; Hugo Becker; Kool Shen; Seth Gueko; Dosseh; Hache P.; Hubert Koundé; Nessbeal
- Cinematography: Marie Spencer
- Edited by: Julien Rey
- Music by: 38ème Donne
- Production companies: Vito Films; Naïa Productions; 7 Apache Films; Digital District; Canal+; Ciné+; Cofinova 14; La Banque Postale Image 11
- Distributed by: Océan Films
- Release date: 20 February 2019 (France)
- Running time: 94 minutes
- Country: France
- Language: French

Paradise Beach is a 2019 French action thriller film directed and co-written by Xavier Durringer. In the film, a bank robber released from prison after 15 years goes to Thailand to meet up with his now-retired accomplices and demand his share of money. The film was released in France on 20 February 2019 and on Netflix internationally November 8, 2019 but was removed in November 2024.

== Plot ==
Mehdi is released after 15 years in prison in France and flies to Phuket, Thailand, to join the bank robbery gang who stole millions after a heist in Paris. Mehdi's bid to get his long-awaited share as compensation for his time in prison sets off a chain reaction of disasters for the gang members.

== Cast ==
- Sami Bouajila as Medhi
- Mélanie Doutey as Julia
- Tewfik Jallab as Hicham
- Hugo Becker as Frank
- Kool Shen as Winny
- Hubert Koundé as Koyave
- Sonia Couling as Aom
- Flore Bonaventura as Tatiana
- Seth Gueko as Zak
- Dosseh as Dango
- Nessbeal as Slim
- Bruno Lopes as Winny
- Chalad Na Songkhla as Pichai
- Vithaya Pansringarm as Sirimongkon
- Karnpitchar Ketmanee as Ava
