= Cara Theobold =

British actress (born 1990)

- Born: Cara Louise Theobold; 8 January 1990 (age 36); Wakefield, West Yorkshire, England
- Education: Guildhall School of Music and Drama
- Occupations: Actress, voice actress

Cara Louise Theobold (born 8 January 1990) is an English actress. She made her debut as Ivy Stuart in the ITV period drama Downton Abbey (2012–2013). She has since starred in the BBC series The Syndicate and Together (both 2015), the E4 comedy Crazyhead (2016), and the Amazon Prime thriller Absentia (2017–2020).

She also voiced Tracer in the video game Overwatch.

== Early life ==
Theobold was born in Wakefield, West Yorkshire. She attended Outwood Grange Academy before going on to study at the Guildhall School of Music and Drama.

== Career ==
During the 2011 Christmas holidays of her final year at the Guildhall, Theobold auditioned for the Downton Abbey role of Ivy Stuart. She was allowed to finish her final year of drama school early to begin filming the series at Easter. Theobold characterised Ivy as "ambitious" and "a dreamer". She returned for the fourth series of the show in 2013. Her work on the series resulted in her being a co-recipient of the Screen Actors Guild Award for Outstanding Performance by an Ensemble in a Drama Series.

In 2014, Theobold made a guest appearance on the TV sitcom Lovesick (formerly known as Scrotal Recall). In 2015, she appeared in two episodes of Last Tango in Halifax as Holly, and in an episode of Call the Midwife. She next starred as Sarah, a housekeeper for a stately home, one of the main characters in the third series of The Syndicate, which aired in spring 2015. She is also the voice actress for Tracer in the video games Overwatch and Heroes of the Storm, and starred in the E4/Netflix original series Crazyhead alongside Susan Wokoma. In 2016, it was announced that Theobold would star in Absentia along with Stana Katic and Patrick Heusinger. In 2019, she appeared in ITV2 series Zomboat! as “fiery, feisty and very much the centre of her own universe” Jo, one of the show's main characters. In 2018, she played the part of Victoria Brown in the Polish film, 303 Squadron.

== Filmography ==
=== Film ===
Year(s)	Title	Role	Notes
2016	Zombie Spring Breakers	Ellie	
2018	Ready Player One	Tracer	
2018	303 Squadron	Victoria Brown	
2019	Around the Sun	Maggie	
2021	Promises	Jane	

=== Television ===
Year(s)	Title	Role	Notes
2012–2013	Downton Abbey	Ivy Stuart	Main cast (series 3–4)
2014	Lovesick	Ilona McLeod	Episode: "Cressida"
2015	Last Tango in Halifax	Holly	2 episodes
2015	Call the Midwife	Marie Amos	1 episode
2015	The Syndicate	Sarah Travers	Main cast (series 3)
2015	Together	Ellen	Main cast, 6 episodes
2015	Harry Price Ghost Hunter	Sarah Grey (Housemaid)	Television film
2016	Crazyhead	Amy	Main cast, 6 episodes
2017–2020	Absentia	Alice Durand	Main cast (seasons 1–2), 2 episodes (season 3)
2018	Kiri	Lucy	Miniseries, 2 episodes
2019	Manhunt	Laura Marsh	Episode: "The Suspect"
2019	Flack	Caitlin	Episode: "Brooke"
2019	Zomboat!	Jo	Main cast, 6 episodes
2023	Death in Paradise	Rose Dalton	2 episodes
2023	The Long Shadow	WPC Jill Adams	Miniseries, 1 episode
2025	Boarders	Jude	6 episodes
2025	The Hack	Amelia Hill	Miniseries, 2 episodes
2026	Adultery	Amy Blakeworth	3 episodes
TBA	The Detection Club	Dorothy L. Sayers	Upcoming ten-part drama

=== Video games ===
Year(s)	Title	Role (voice)	Notes
2015	Heroes of the Storm	Tracer	
2016	Overwatch	Tracer	English version
2021	Diablo II: Resurrected	(voice)	
2022	Elden Ring	Nepheli Loux	
2022	Diablo Immortal	(voice)	
2022	Overwatch 2	Tracer	
2022	World of Warcraft: Dragonflight	(voice)	
2023	Diablo IV	(additional voices)	
2026	Wuthering Waves	Aemeath	English version
