= Lewis Reeves =

British actor

- Born: 29 March 1988 (age 38); Doncaster, South Yorkshire, England
- Occupation: Actor
- Years active: 2012-present

Lewis Reeves (born 29 March 1988) is an English actor. He is known for his roles as Jake in the comedy horror series Crazyhead, as Gareth Walker in the video games FIFA 17, FIFA 18 and FIFA 19, and as Eric in the Donmar production of My Night with Reg by Kevin Elyot.

== Filmography ==
=== Film ===
Year	Title	Role
2019	Born a King	Prince of Wales

=== Television ===
Year	Title	Role	Notes
2012	Holby City	Marc North	Episode: "Awarded"
2012	White Van Man	Danny	Episode: "They Think It's All Over"
2012	Doctors	Stevie Vickers	Episode: "Back Inside"
2012	Coming Up	Ben	Episode: "Ben and Lump"
2013	Lee Nelson's Well Funny People	Damo	3 episodes
2013	Law & Order: UK	Darren Porter	2 episodes
2013	Misfits	Ben	Episode: "Death by Compassion"
2014	Inspector George Gently	Sam Hawkes	Episode: "Gently Going Under"
2014	Our World War	Henry Delaney	Miniseries; episode: "Pals"
2015	Uncle	Ryan	3 episodes
2015–2021	Unforgotten	DC Jake Collier	Main role
2015	Harry Price: Ghost Hunter	Vernon Wall	Television film
2016	Crazyhead	Jake	Main role
2020	I May Destroy You	David	3 episodes
2022	The Sandman	Philip Sitz/The Boogieman	Episode: "Collectors"
2026	Industry	Roland Rednerg	Episode: "Tender"

=== Theatre ===
Year	Title	Role	Venue	Ref(s)
2012	Our Boys	Ian	Duchess Theatre, London	
2014–2015	My Night with Reg	Eric	Donmar Warehouse, London (2014); Apollo Theatre, London (2015)	
2019	Vanya and Sonia and Masha and Spike	Spike	Ustinov Studio, Bath	

=== Video games ===
Year	Title	Role	Notes
2016	FIFA 17	Gareth Walker	Voice role
2017	FIFA 18	Gareth Walker	Voice role
