= Ritu Arya =

English actress (born 1988/1989)

- Born: 1988 or 1989 (age 37–38); Surrey, England, UK
- Education: University of Southampton (BSc); Oxford School of Drama (GrDip)
- Occupation: Actress
- Years active: 2012–present
- Musical career
- Instrument: Drum
- Formerly of: KIN (2018-2022)

Ritu Arya (born 1988/1989) is a British actress. She first became known for her role as Megan Sharma in the soap opera Doctors (2017), for which she was nominated for a British Soap Award. She gained further recognition for her roles as Flash in the sci-fi series Humans (2016–2018) and Lila Pitts in the Netflix series The Umbrella Academy (2020–2024). She also starred in the film Polite Society (2023) as Lena Khan.

== Early life and education ==
Ritu Arya was born and grew up in Guildford, Surrey. She is of Indian descent, and has two brothers, Romi and Rahul, the latter of whom is also an actor. She began acting as a teenager.

She attended George Abbot School before obtaining a BSc in astrophysics from the University of Southampton in Southampton, England, where she performed as part of the Southampton University Theatre Group and Comedy Society, including several shows at the Edinburgh Fringe Festival. She subsequently trained at the Oxford School of Drama.

== Career ==
=== Acting ===
Arya first had acting roles in a series of roles in short films, and had a guest appearance in the series Sherlock in 2014.

She played the recurring role of Dr. Megan Sharma in the British soap opera Doctors, for which she was nominated for the British Soap Award for Best Newcomer in 2017. She also had a recurring role as the android Flash in the series Humans from 2016 to 2018.

In 2019, Arya appeared as Jenna in the film Last Christmas, which was a commercial success. The following year, she had a recurring role as Lava in the Netflix series Feel Good and guest starred in the series Doctor Who.

In 2020, Arya starred as Lila Pitts in the second season of the Netflix original series The Umbrella Academy, which earned her praise. She reprised the character in the series' third and fourth seasons, which were released in 2022 and 2024. Bustle magazine described her performance in the series as "scene-stealing" and Uproxx called Arya the "wild-card" of the show. The series ended in 2024.

In 2021, Arya co-starred in the Netflix film Red Notice, and in 2023 appeared in Greta Gerwig's Barbie.

In 2024 she plays a lead role in the action series Paris Has Fallen as MI6 operative Zara Taylor, opposite French actor Tewfik Jallab.

=== Music ===
Arya was a drummer and part of the band KIN, who released their debut single "Sharing Light" in April 2020. Their follow-up single "L.O.V.E." premiered on 6 August 2020. On 16 October 2022, KIN released a statement saying that Arya had left the band and that her last live show with them was on 14 October 2022 in London.

== Filmography ==
=== Film ===
Year	Title	Role	Notes
2015	My Beautiful White Skin	Parita	Short film
2017	Daphne	Rachida	
2017	Jessamine	Sonya	Short film
2017	The Super Recogniser	Agent Williams	Short film
2018	Lady Parts	Saira	Short film
2019	Last Christmas	Jenna	
2021	Red Notice	Inspector Urvashi Das	
2023	Polite Society	Lena Khan	
2023	Barbie	Journalist Barbie	

=== Television ===
Year	Title	Role	Notes
2013	Doctors	Sukhinder Nain	Episode: "Embarrassing Bodies"
2013	The Tunnel	Bureau Girl	Episode #1.6
2014	Sherlock	Gail	Episode: "The Sign of Three"
2016	We The Jury	Kate	Episode: "Pilot"
2016–2018	Humans	Flash	Recurring role (series 2–3)
2017	Crackanory	Eleni / Beth	2 episodes
2017	Doctors	Dr. Megan Sharma	Soap opera, recurring role
2018–2019	The Good Karma Hospital	Barsha Nambeesan	Recurring role (series 2–3)
2019	Sticks and Stones	Becky	Limited-run series, main cast
2020	Doctor Who	Gat	Episode: "Fugitive of the Judoon"
2020	The Stranger	Michaela	Miniseries, 1 episode
2020	Feel Good	Lava	Recurring role (season 1)
2020–2024	The Umbrella Academy	Lila Pitts	Main cast (seasons 2–4)
2024	Paris Has Fallen	Zara Taylor	Main cast
2026	Bait	Yasmin	Limited-run series, recurring role
2026	The Split Up	Aria Kishan	Main cast
2026	Apollo Has Fallen	Zara Taylor	Main cast

=== Theatre ===
Year	Title	Role	Venue	Ref
2013	Carpe Diem	Aishah	Royal National Theatre, London	
2014	The Fourth Wise Man	Samira	Unicorn Theatre, London	
2015	Mermaid	Mermaid/Ensemble	UK Tour	
2015	We Know Where You Live	Asma	Finborough Theatre, London	
2015	Beauty and the Beast	Belle	Polka Theatre, London	
2016	Noises Off	Poppy	Nottingham Playhouse, Nottingham	
2017	Mother Christmas	Grace	Hampstead Theatre, London	
2018	Genesis Inc.	Serena	Hampstead Theatre, London	
