= Trevor Morris (musician) =

- Born: 25 May 1970 (age 55); London, Ontario, Canada
- Genres: Film score, video game score
- Occupations: Film composer, music producer
- Years active: 1999–present
- Labels: Remote Control Productions
- Website: http://www.trevormorris.com/

Trevor Morris (born 25 May 1970) is a Canadian orchestral composer and music producer. His scores include the television shows The Tudors, The Pillars of the Earth, The Borgias, and Vikings; the film Olympus Has Fallen and its sequel London Has Fallen; and the video game Dragon Age: Inquisition. He was nominated for an Emmy for Outstanding Original Main Title Theme Music for his score for The Borgias and for Outstanding Music Composition for a Miniseries, Movie or A Special (Original Dramatic Score) for his score for The Pillars of the Earth.

== Life and work ==
Morris was born in London, Ontario, Canada. He was accepted to St. Mary's School for the Arts as a child, where he studied violin and choir daily. At age 13, Morris was commissioned by his school to compose a piece for his graduating class to perform in honor of the Pope John Paul II's visit to Canada. His fee was $50. Beloved Young People, a book authored by the Pope aimed at the youth of the generation, became the source for adapted lyrics, and Trevor's senior class performed his composition for Piano and 4-part Choir at St. Mary's Cathedral at graduation.

Morris attended Fanshawe College's "Music Industry Arts" program, where he graduated top of his class. Upon graduation, Morris immediately moved to Toronto to start work. He spent his twenties in the music production circles of Toronto but eventually turned his attention away from production and over to composing full-time music for television commercials. Wanting a longer format for his music ideas, Morris moved towards scoring films and television series and in 1999 he moved to Los Angeles to follow this new career angle. During his early years in Los Angeles, Morris worked with famous score composers James Newton Howard and Hans Zimmer. As part of Zimmer's team, Morris amassed over 25 major screen credits on some of Hollywood's blockbusters.

As Morris' own career in composition developed, so did the opportunity to directly collaborate with others such as Jerry Bruckheimer, Neil Jordan and Tony and Ridley Scott. In 2007 Morris received an Emmy for Outstanding Original Main Title Theme Music for The Tudors. 2010 marked Morris' fourth television collaboration with Jerry Bruckheimer and his team. Morris also completed the mini-series The Pillars of the Earth with Tony and Ridley Scott producing. Morris has worked as composer on a number of video games including SimCity Societies, Army of Two, Need for Speed: Carbon and most recently, for the epic third installment of the Dragon Age series by BioWare, Dragon Age: Inquisition as well as films such as The Hills Have Eyes 2, and The Marine 2. He produced the score for the 2013 film Olympus Has Fallen.

Morris maintains a production company in Toronto with his partners. He currently lives and works in Los Angeles with his family.

== Discography ==
=== Films ===
Year	Title	Director	Studio(s)	Notes
1999	Teen Knight	Phil Comeau	The Kushner-Locke Company; Castel Films; Canarom Productions	
2001	Hunger	Maria Giese	Market Street Productions	
2002	Judge Is God	James Allen		Short
2003	Terminal Venus	Alexandre Franchi		Short
2004	Rancid	Jack Ersgard	Sonet Film	Swedish language
2005	The Lost Angel	Dimitri Logothetis	Elio Pictures; 4 Square Productions Canada; Synergy Movies	
2005	3 Needles	Thom Fitzgerald	Bigfoot Entertainment; Emotion Pictures; Wolfe Releasing	Composed with Christophe Beck
2007	The Hills Have Eyes 2	Martin Weisz	Fox Atomic; Dune Entertainment	
2009	Stolen	Anders Anderson	IFC Films	
2009	The Marine 2	Roel Reiné	20th Century Fox; WWE Films	Direct-to-video
2010	Krews	Hilbert Hakim	Osiris Entertainment; KH Krews Productions	
2010	Beautiful Boy	Shawn Ku	Anchor Bay Entertainment	
2011	Tornado Alley	Sean C. Casey	Giant Screen Films; Graphic Films	
2011	Immortals	Tarsem Singh	Relativity Media; Virgin Produced; Rogue	
2012	Gotham	Francis Lawrence	20th Television	Television
2012	The Scorpion King 3: Battle for Redemption	Roel Reiné	Universal Pictures	Direct-to-video
2012	Fire with Fire	David Barrett	Lionsgate	
2013	Death Race 3: Inferno	Roel Reiné	Universal Pictures	Direct-to-video
2013	Olympus Has Fallen	Antoine Fuqua	FilmDistrict; Millennium Films	
2016	London Has Fallen	Babak Najafi	Focus Features; Millennium Films	
2016	Hard Target 2	Roel Reiné	Universal 1440 Entertainment	Composed with Jack Wall; Direct-to-video
2018	Redbad	Roel Reiné	Splendid Films; Epic Pictures Group	
2018	Asura	Peng Zhang	Alibaba Pictures	
2018	Hunter Killer	Donovan Marsh	Summit Entertainment	

=== Television ===
Year	Title	Network	Notes
1997	Splat!	Nickelodeon Studios	
2000	Code Name: Eternity	Sci Fi Channel	
2005–2006	E-Ring	NBC	
2006–2007	Justice	Fox	
2007	Traveler	ABC	Episode: "The Retreat"; Co-composed with Blake Neely
2007–2008	Moonlight	CBS	Co-composed with John Frizzell
2007–2010	The Tudors	Showtime	
2009	Kings	NBC	
2009	Mental	Fox Television Studios	
2010	Day One	NBC	Episode: "Pilot"
2010	The Bridge	CTV	
2010	Miami Medical	CBS	
2010	The Pillars of the Earth	Starz	TV miniseries
2010–2011	Chase	NBC	
2011–2013	The Borgias	Showtime	
2012	The Firm	NBC	
2012	Alphas	Syfy	Co-composed with Edward Rogers
2013–2020	Vikings	History; Netflix	Additional contributions by Wardruna & Einar Selvik
2013	Body of Proof	ABC	Composed Season 3
2013	Dracula	NBC	
2013–2017	Reign	The CW	
2017–2019	Shadowhunters	Freeform	Co-composed with Jack Wall
2017	Iron Fist	Netflix	Composed Season 1
2017–2018	Taken	NBC	
2017–2021	Castlevania	Netflix	
2018–2020	Condor	Audience; Epix	
2019–2021	Another Life	Netflix	
2020–2023	Big Sky	ABC	
2022–2024	Vikings: Valhalla	Netflix	Additional contributions by Lustmord
2023–present	Castlevania: Nocturne	Netflix	Co-composed with Trey Toy

=== Video games ===
Year	Title	Studio	Notes
2006	Need for Speed: Carbon	Electronic Arts	
2007	SimCity Societies	Electronic Arts	
2007	Command & Conquer 3: Tiberium Wars	Electronic Arts	Co-composed with Steve Jablonsky
2008	Army of Two	Electronic Arts	
2009	Marvel: Ultimate Alliance 2	Activision	
2014	Dragon Age: Inquisition	Electronic Arts	
2015	Dragon Age: Inquisition – The Descent	Electronic Arts	
2015	Dragon Age: Inquisition – Trespasser	Electronic Arts	
2024	Banishers: Ghosts of New Eden	Focus Entertainment	

== Awards ==
Year	Award	Category
2007	Primetime Emmy Award	Outstanding Original Main Title Theme Music (for The Tudors)
