= Tewfik Jallab =

French actor

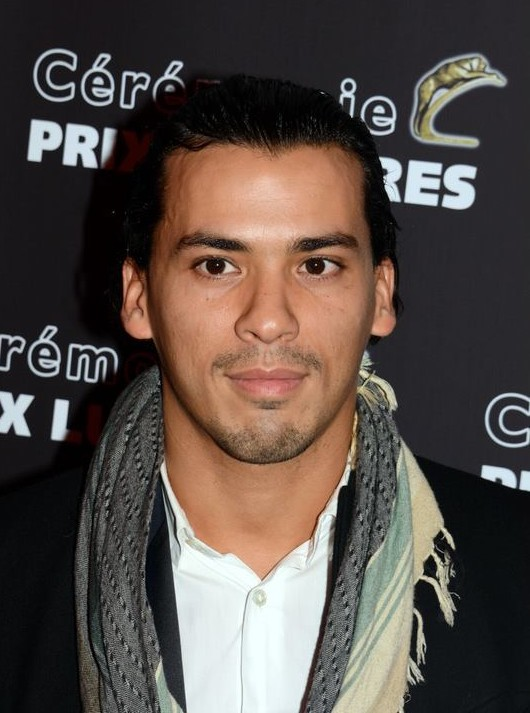
- Jallab in 2014
- Born: Argenteuil, France
- Occupation: Actor
- Years active: 1994–present
- Known for: Spiral, Paris Has Fallen

Tewfik Jallab is a French actor.

== Early life and education ==
Tewfik Jallab was born in Argenteuil, France, of a Moroccan mother and Algerian-Tunisian father.

He had his first film role at the age of 10, playing a child soldier in the 1994 film Killer Kid.

== Career ==
Jallab had many roles on stage in France during his early career.

He plays a young detective, Ali, in the 7th (2019) and 8th (2020) seasons of the French police drama series Spiral.

In 2024 he plays a lead role in the action series Paris Has Fallen as former soldier turned protection officer Vincent, opposite English actress Ritu Arya.

== Theatre ==
Year	Title	Author	Director	Notes
2003	Britannicus	Jean Racine	Cyril Anrep	Théâtre Pierre Dux
2003	Love's Labour's Lost	William Shakespeare	David Clavel	Théâtre Maria Casares
2007	Parle-moi de la guerre pour que je t'aime	Elie Karam	Jean-Paul Wenzel (2)	Théâtre du Rond-Point
2007	Ombres portées	Jean-Paul Wenzel	Jean-Paul Wenzel	Théâtre National de Cergy-Pontoise
2008-10	Littoral	Wajdi Mouawad	Wajdi Mouawad	Tour
2008-10	Le Sang des Promesses	Wajdi Mouawad	Wajdi Mouawad (2)	Tour
2010	Masques et nez	Igor Mendjisky	Igor Mendjisky	Théâtre des Champs-Élysées
2011	One Thousand and One Nights		Tim Supple	Shakespeare theater
2011	Splendid's	Jean Genet	Cristèle Alves Meira	Théâtre de l'Athénée
2012	Le livre de Damas et des prophéties	Saadallah Wannous	Fida Mohissen	National Theatre of Tunisia
2012	Même pour ne pas vaincre	Stéphane Chaumet	Élodie Chanut	Théâtre de La Forge
2013	La guerre des banlieues n'aura pas lieu	Abd al Malik	Abd al Malik	Théatre de Vitry
2014	Masques et nez	Igor Mendjisky	Igor Mendjisky (2)	Théâtre des Mathurins

== Filmography ==
Year	Title	Role	Director	Notes
1994	Killer Kid	Djilali	Gilles de Maistre	
1999	P.J.	Kader	Frédéric Krivine & Gérard Vergez	TV series (3 episodes)
2004	Stéréotypes		Anthony Decadi	Short
2004	Élodie Bradford	Tadjine	Olivier Guignard	TV series (1 episode)
2006	Qui de nous deux	Simo	Charles Belmont	
2007	Avocats & associés	Rachid Laouri	Bruno Garcia	TV series (1 episode)
2008	Bientôt j'arrête	Chanel's Friend	Léa Fazer	Short
2008-09	Adresse inconnue	Icham Alaoui	Alain Wermus, Rodolphe Tissot, ...	TV series (10 episodes)
2009	L'année de l'Algérie	Bilal	May Bouhada	Short
2009	La tueuse	Lawyer Saunier	Rodolphe Tissot (2)	TV movie
2009	Joséphine, ange gardien	César	Pascal Heylbroeck	TV series (1 episode)
2009	Vénus & Apollon	Guillaume	Pascal Lahmani	TV series (6 episodes)
2010	Coline (Les amis de mes amis)		Etienne Constantinesco	
2010	Pas si simple	Jalil	Rachida Krim	TV movie
2010	Frères	Mehdi	Virginie Sauveur	TV movie
2012	Un nuage dans un verre d'eau	Khalil	Srinath Samarasinghe	
2013	The Marchers	Mohamed	Nabil Ben Yadir	Nominated - Lumière Award for Most Promising Actor
2013	Né quelque part	Farid Hadji	Mohamed Hamidi	
2016	Team Spirit	Samir	Christophe Barratier	
2016	Le convoi	Imad	Frédéric Schoendoerffer	
2016	Lola Pater	Zino	Nadir Moknèche	
2016	Trepalium		Vincent Lannoo	TV mini-series
2017	Back to Burgundy	Marouan	Cédric Klapisch	
2019	Paradise Beach	Hicham	Xavier Durringer	
2022	Oussekine	Mohamed Oussekine	Antoine Chevrollier	TV series
2023	Like a Prince	Karim	Ali Marhyar	
2024	Paris Has Fallen	Vincent Taleb	Oded Ruskin & Hans Herbots	TV series. Lead role
2025	Leave One Day	Sofiane	Amélie Bonnin	
