= Alan Siegel =

American businessman

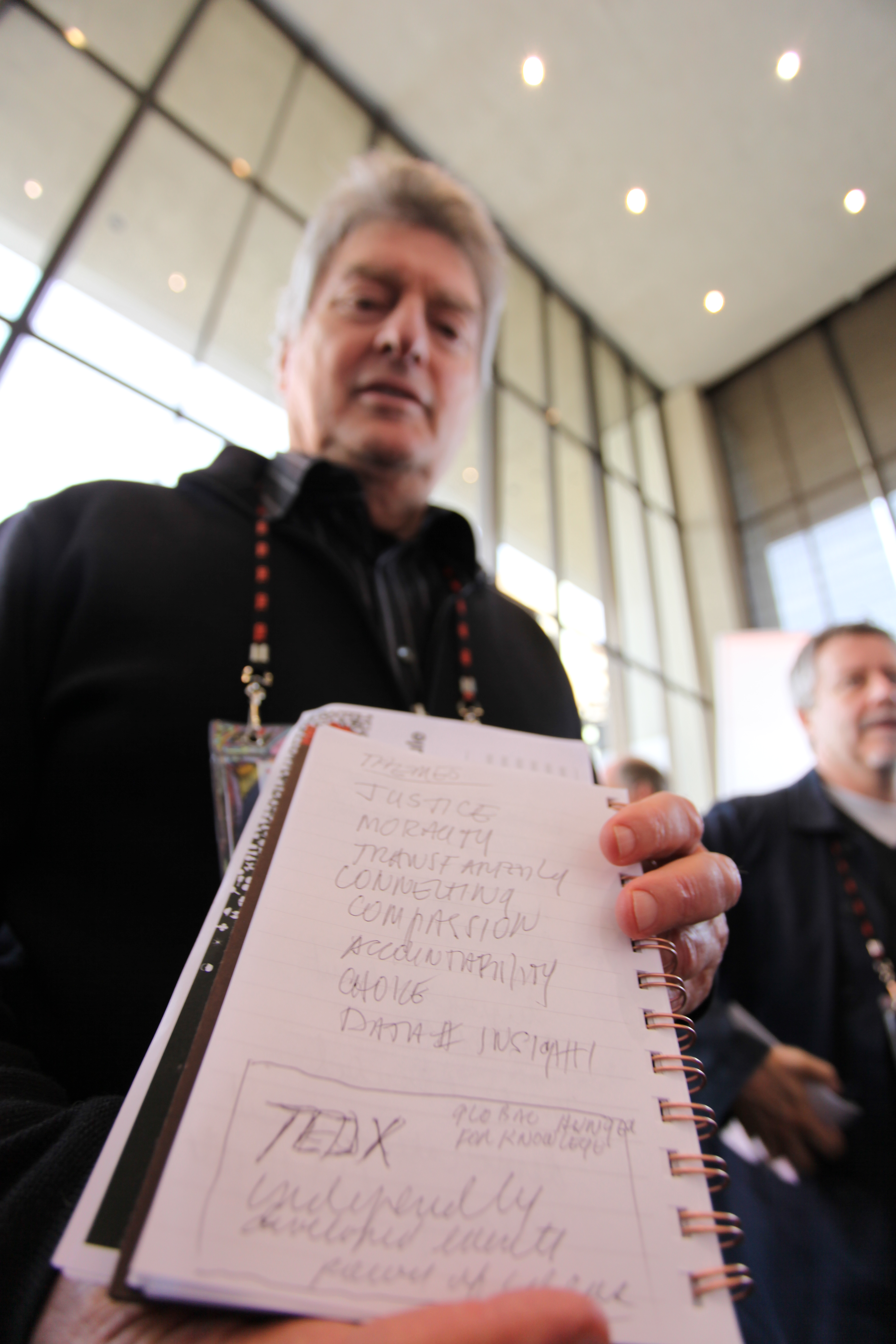
Siegel at the 2010 TED Talks in Long Beach, California.

Alan Siegel (born August 26, 1938) is the CEO of Siegelvision, a brand identity consultancy. He is the founder and chairman emeritus of the global brand strategy firm Siegel+Gale.

== Early life ==
Alan Siegel was born to Eugene and Ruth Siegel in New York. He attended Long Beach High School where he played basketball. After high school, Siegel attended the Industrial Labor Relations School at Cornell University.

Upon graduating from Cornell, Siegel attended the New York University School of Law, but took a leave of absence in 1962 to accept an army commission. Siegel trained at Fort Sill, in Lawton, Oklahoma, and was stationed with the 2nd Howitzer Battalion, 18th Artillery, in Butzbach, Germany.

After he returned from Germany, Siegel decided to leave NYU Law to pursue a career in communications. Throughout the 1960s, he worked at a number of major communications firms, including BBDO, Ruder Finn and Sandgren & Murtha. During this time he also met his wife, Gloria, with whom he has a daughter.

== Career ==
=== Siegel+Gale ===
In 1969, Siegel and Robert Gale, a designer who Siegel worked with at Sandgren & Murtha, established their own agency, Siegel+Gale. Initially, the agency drew in clients that were mostly interested in developing their visual identities. In 1974, Gale sold his part of the agency. Over the years, Siegel+Gale grew from a logo and design focused company to pioneering the development of corporate voice and simplification. The firm's notable clients have included Dell, MasterCard, the NBA, Caterpillar, 3M, Xerox, American Express and The New School.

Throughout the 1970s, Siegel was the leading voice in the plain English movement that proposed simplifying complex financial and legal documents. In 1979, the Internal Revenue Service hired Siegel to transform existing tax forms, resulting in the 1040-EZ form. Siegel also worked on simplifying bank contracts and Census Bureau forms. Siegel's advocacy for simplicity has led to him appearing on The Today Show, The McNeil-Lehrer Report, CNN, CBS News, ABC News and in People magazine.

Siegel was an associate professor of law at Fordham University School of Law, where he designed and taught a legal writing course. He was also an adjunct professor at Carnegie Mellon University, where he helped found the Communications Design Center.

In 2012, Siegel retired from Siegel+Gale and assumed the title of chairman emeritus.

=== Siegelvision ===
After leaving Siegel+Gale, Siegel founded Siegelvision, a brand identity consultancy that focuses on non-profit and educational organizations and foundations.

Siegelvision's clients include New York University, National Public Radio, Cornell's College of Engineering, the John Jay College of Criminal Justice, the Legal Aid Society, the Lupus Foundation of America, the Alzheimer's Drug Discovery Foundation, and Phoenix House.

== Other activities ==
Siegel is active in the community and is on numerous boards and cultural organizations, including the American Theatre Wing where he is a Tony Award voter.

He spoke about simplifying legal jargon at TED 2010 where, in closing he said, "There is no way that we should allow government to communicate the way they communicate. There is no way we should do business with companies that have agreements with stealth provisions and that are unintelligible. So, how are we going to change the world? Make clarity, transparency and simplicity a national priority."

Siegel is a regular columnist in The Huffington Post where he writes about simplicity as it pertains to current events and business trends. He has also written for The Wall Street Journal, including guides such as The Wall Street Journal Guide to Money and Markets, Writing Contracts in Plain English and Simplified Consumer Credit Forms. Siegel also wrote One Man's Eye: Photographs from the Alan Siegel Collection and Step Right This Way: The Photography of Edward J. Kelty.

He co-wrote the 2013 book Simple: Conquering the Crisis of Complexity on the power of simplicity in business and government, with Irene Etzkorn, Siegelvision's chief clarity officer. Simple was named one of the best business books of 2013 and the best marketing book of the year by Strategy+Business magazine.
