= Howard Overman =

British television writer

- Occupations: Screenwriter and television producer.
- Writing career
- Period: 2005–present
- Genres: Comedy, drama, adventure, science fiction

Howard Overman is a British television writer, best known for creating the series Misfits which won the 2010 BAFTA Television Award for Best Drama Series.

== Career ==
Overman has written scripts for serial dramas such as Hotel Babylon, New Tricks, Hustle, Harley Street and Merlin.In 2009 Overman created the E4 series Misfits (TV series) which ran for 5 series. In 2010 Overman created the BBC Four sci-fi comedy series Dirk Gently based on the novels by Douglas Adams. He wrote the script for the pilot and the first episode and also served as an executive producer. He created the BBC One fantasy drama Atlantis, first aired in autumn 2013, which ran for two series.

In 2016 Overman made a return to E4 with his series Crazyhead, a co-production with Channel 4 and Netflix. Overman serves as an executive producer with his company Urban Myth Films. In 2019, he created and wrote a TV series adaptation of War of the Worlds based on the H. G. Wells novel but was a modern retelling. It was renewed for a second, and then, in July 2021, War of the Worlds was renewed for a third season, with production already underway. The third season is set to air in 2022. He adapted The One, John Marrs's 2016 novel of the same name, for Netflix in 2021.

== Writing credits ==
Production	Notes	Broadcaster
In the Bathroom	Short film (2005)	—N/a
Hustle	"Missions" (2005)	BBC One
New Tricks	"Trust Me" (2005)	BBC One
Perfect Day	Television film (2005)	Channel 5
Moving Wallpaper	"Episode #1.2" (2008); "Episode #1.6" (2008); "Episode #1.8" (2008)	ITV
Hotel Babylon	"Episode #1.3" (2006); "Episode #1.6" (2006); "Episode #3.6" (2008)	BBC One
Dis/Connected	Television film (2008)	BBC Three
Spooks: Code 9	"Episode #1.2" (2008)	BBC Three
Harley Street	"Episode #1.5" (2008)	ITV
Merlin	11 episodes (2008–2011)	BBC One
Misfits	37 episodes (2009–2013)	E4
Vexed	Television miniseries (2010)	BBC Two
Dirk Gently	Television miniseries (2010, 2012)	BBC Four
Atlantis	Co-creator, 25 episodes (2013–2015)	BBC One
Crazyhead	6 episodes (2016)	E4/Netflix
Future Man	Co-creator (2017–2019)	Hulu
War of the Worlds	Creator, writer (2019–2022)	Fox / Star (UK); Canal + (France)
The One	Creator, writer (2021)	Netflix
Paris Has Fallen	Creator, writer (2024)	Canal +
Apollo Has Fallen	Creator, writer (2026)	Canal +

== Awards and nominations ==
Year	Award	Work	Category	Result	Reference
2010	British Academy Television Awards	Misfits	Best Drama Series	Won	
2010	Rose d'Or Light Entertainment Festival	Misfits	Best Drama & Mini-Series	Nominated	
2010	Royal Television Society Awards	Misfits	Best Writer – Drama	Nominated	
2010	TV Quick Award	Misfits	Best New Drama	Nominated	
2011	British Academy Television Awards	Misfits (shared with Petra Fried, Kate Crowe and Murray Ferguson)	Best Drama Series	Nominated	
2011	British Comedy Awards	Misfits	Best TV Comedy Drama	Nominated	
2011	Broadcast Awards	Misfits	Best Multichannel Programme	Won	
2011	Golden Nymph	—N/a (shared with Petra Fried and Murray Ferguson)	Best International Producer	Nominated	
2011	Golden Nymph	—N/a (shared with Petra Fried and Murray Ferguson)	Best European Producer	Nominated	
2011	Royal Television Society Awards	Misfits	Best Drama Series	Nominated	
2011	SFX Awards	Misfits	Breakout of the Year	Won	
2011	SFX Awards	Misfits (shared with Petra Fried, Kate Crowe and Murray Ferguson)	Best TV Show	Nominated	
2011	TV Quick Awards	Misfits	Best Drama Series	Nominated	
2012	British Academy Television Awards	Misfits (shared with Petra Fried, Murray Ferguson and Matt Strevens)	Best Drama Series	Nominated	
2012	SFX Awards	Misfits	Best TV Show	Nominated	
