= Johnny Capps =

British television producer

Johnny Capps is a British television producer and writer, best known for co-creating the BBC fantasy adventure series Merlin and later, Atlantis.

== Career ==
Capps began his career at the BBC after graduating, working as a script editor on programmes such as Dangerfield. He would transition onto producing with the first series of As If. Along with Julian Murphy, Capps founded Shine Drama to develop television series. One of them was Merlin. The BBC had been keen on a family-oriented drama, based on the character of Merlin from the Arthurian legend. Capps and Murphy, alongside Julian Jones and Jake Michie, created a version that was put into development in late 2006.

This series went into production in March 2008, produced by Shine in association with BBC Wales, whose Head of Drama Julie Gardner was executive producer for the BBC. CGI special effects for the series were provided by The Mill. With a first series of 13 episodes, Merlin began on 20 September 2008. Despite received mixed reviews, it did well in the ratings, running for five series and later becoming the most popular programme on the BBC's digital catch-up service, iPlayer.

Capps later co-created Atlantis, again with Murphy, first broadcast in 2013, which ran for two series. The show was cancelled after its second series. Along with collaborators Murphy and Howard Overman, Capps would found the production company Urban Myth Films, which produces fantasy and science fiction television series. These have included War of the Worlds for Canal+, and The One, adapted from John Marrs's 2016 novel of the same name, for Netflix.
