= Tarek Anthony Jabre =

American film producer and financier

Tarek Anthony Jabre is a film producer and financier. He is best known for his work on Heist (2015), Silence (2016) and Boiling Point (2022).

== Education ==
Jabre attended Royal Holloway University of London, where he acquired a Bachelor's of Art in French with Business Management, before beginning his career in finance, dealing with FX currency trading, portfolio management, and private clients' funds.

== Career ==
Based in Geneva, Paris, and London, Jabre worked alongside firms such as UBS, Credit Suisse, Credit Agricole, Merrill Lynch, and Prudential Bache.

In 2012, Jabre started producing and financing films, and founded Vedette Finance's Feature Film division, a film development and finance company based in Los Angeles.

Some of his early projects include The Angriest Man in Brooklyn, starring Robin Williams, Mila Kunis, Peter Dinklage;The Face of an Angel, starring Kate Beckinsale, Daniel Brühl, Cara Delevingne; and Heist, starring Robert De Niro, Jeffrey Dean Morgan, Kate Bosworth. More recent films include Martin Scorsese’s Silence starring Andrew Garfield, Adam Driver, Liam Neeson; Aftermath, starring Arnold Schwarzenegger, Scoot McNairy, Maggie Grace; and Boiling Point, starring Stephen Graham, Vinette Robinson, Ray Panthaki, and Hannah Walters. The film was nominated for 4 BAFTA awards in 2022.

Other projects in production include Go Away !, starring Hugh Bonneville, Michael Socha, Ella Bruccoleri; and Cliffhanger 2, the sequel to the 1993 Sylvester Stallone film Cliffhanger, starring Lily James, Pierce Brosnan, Nell Tiger Free.

== Films in development ==
Films in development include, Pony. Jabre is producing alongside Bob Cooper, of Landscape Entertainment. The project is about a working-class single father's world, shattered by the unsolved murder of his only son, and will stop at nothing to find his son's killers. In the process, he finds the strength to forgive and become a better person. The script is written by Oscar-nominated screenwriter, Jonathan Herman.

== Filmography ==
- 2010: Siren
- 2013: Enter the Dangerous Mind
- 2014: The Angriest Man in Brooklyn
- 2014: The Prince
- 2014: The Face of an Angel
- 2015: Vice
- 2015: Heist
- 2015: Extraction
- 2016: Precious Cargo
- 2016: Marauders
- 2016: Silence
- 2017: Aftermath
- 2018: London Fields
- 2018: The Life and Death of John Gotti
- 2021 Boiling Point
- 2022 A Violent Man
- 2025 Go Away!
- 2025: Cliffhanger 2

=== In development ===
- Pony
