= Greg MacLennan =

Canadian-American film editor

Greg MacLennan, originally from Ottawa, Ontario, is a feature film editor based in Austin, Texas. He is known for editing Seek, The Pale Door, Margaux, and the 2024 Frank Grillo film Werewolves. Prior to film editing, MacLennan was a film programmer at the Alamo Drafthouse and hosted mystery movie marathons, typically featuring action stars from the '80s and '90s.

== Career ==
MacLennan graduated with a degree in Radio, Television and Film from the University of Texas at Austin. After gaining experience working at video stores and writing for several film websites, MacLennan worked in casting on various TV shows before becoming a film programmer and head of the video department at the Alamo Drafthouse, owned by Tim League.

In addition to making movie montages for the Drafthouse, MacLennan was well-known for his mystery movie marathons. Most notable of these marathons included Cruise Control (featuring Tom Cruise movies), RussellMania (featuring Kurt Russell films), Baymaggedon (featuring Michael Bay films), The Stallone Zone (featuring Sylvester Stallone films), and CAGED (featuring Nicolas Cage films).

MacLennan hosted four CAGED marathons, with Cage himself programming films in 2017, reading “The Tell-Tale Heart” by Edgar Allan Poe and presiding over a marriage proposal at the Alamo Drafthouse in Austin.

After cutting a movie trailer for Michel Gondry's Mood Indigo, MacLennan transitioned to Drafthouse Films, where he served as A/V Creative Director, editing movie trailers for films like Spring, Roar, and the silent film The Tribe. He later took on the same role at NEON, working on campaigns for The Bad Batch and I, Tonya (both of which were named as two of "The Best Movie Trailers of 2017" by Film School Rejects, as well as Colossal (with his trailer named as one of "The 10 Most Memorable Movie Ad Campaigns of 2017" by AdWeek.

MacLennan eventually ventured into editing short films, movie trailers, and feature films under his company name Electric Owl Creative. MacLennan got his start editing feature films with Paper Street Pictures, after a run-in with director Aaron Koontz, where MacLennan asked if he could be an extra in his next film and "die onscreen." This encounter led to Koontz inviting MacLennan to edit the western horror film The Pale Door. In 2020, MacLennan also edited the short Seek directed by Aaron Morgan and written by the host of Stephen King-focused podcast "The Kingcast," Eric Vespe, which premiered at Fantastic Fest in 2021. The horror short featured practical visual effects by two-time Academy Award nominee Arjen Tuiten (Wonder, Pan’s Labyrinth, and Ghostbusters: Afterlife). MacLennan won the "Best Editing" Award for Seek at the 2021 Chicago Horror Film Festival. He has additional editing credits on Colossal, Raiders! The Greatest Fan Film Ever Made, A Disturbance in the Force, and Revealer.

The film editor teamed up with director Steven C. Miller for the 2022 smart-home horror film Margaux, starring Madison Pettis, Vanessa Morgan, and Jedidiah Goodacre as a group of college students being terrorized by a Siri-like AI system named Margaux. MacLennan edited the 2024 creature feature Werewolves (formerly known as Year Two) also directed by Miller. Starring Frank Grillo, Werewolves follows two scientists attempting to find a cure to the mutation that causes people to turn into werewolves during a "supermoon" and utilizes practical werewolf costumes and makeup.

MacLennan also worked with Nanfu Wang as a sample editor on Night Is Not Eternal for Max.

MacLennan is a member of the Motion Picture Editors Guild.
