= Extraction (2015 film) =

2015 film by Steven C. Miller

- Theatrical release poster
- Directed by: Steven C. Miller
- Screenplay by: Max Adams; Umair Aleem
- Produced by: Randall Emmett; George Furla; Adam Goldworm; Mark Stewart
- Starring: Kellan Lutz; Bruce Willis; Gina Carano; D. B. Sweeney; Dan Bilzerian; Olga Valentina; Lydia Hull; Tyler J. Olson
- Cinematography: Brandon Cox
- Edited by: Vincent Tabaillon
- Music by: Ryan Dodson
- Production companies: Grindstone Entertainment Group; Emmett/Furla/Oasis Films; Ingenious; The Fyzz Facility
- Distributed by: Lionsgate Premiere
- Release date: December 18, 2015
- Running time: 83 minutes
- Country: United States
- Language: English
- Box office: $1.1 million

Extraction is a 2015 American action thriller film directed by Steven C. Miller and written by Umair Aleem. The film stars Kellan Lutz, Bruce Willis, Gina Carano, D. B. Sweeney, Dan Bilzerian and Steve Coulter. It was released on December 18, 2015, in a limited release, and through video on demand by Lionsgate Premiere. The film received a brief resurgence in 2020 due to another film of the same name becoming popular.

== Plot ==
In 2005, undercover CIA operative Leonard Turner is held captive and interrogated by a group of unidentified Russian arms dealers. His interrogators have been aware of Leonard's true identity and demand a full written list of individuals and businesses affiliated with the CIA in exchange for the safety of his wife and son. Leonard breaks from captivity and kills his interrogators, phoning his colleague Ken Robertson to get his family to safety. Leonard's wife, Kate, was fatally shot by the interrogator's affiliates, while his teenage son, Harry, hesitates on shooting the home invaders before being rescued by Robertson.

In 2015, an adult Harry joins the CIA's Prague branch under Robertson's wing much to Leonard's disapproval. While working as an analyst, Harry undergoes numerous field agent training sessions only to be rejected repeatedly by Leonard behind the scenes.

Meanwhile, Leonard is given an undercover assignment to recover an item called the Condor, a mobile computer capable of hacking the entire global telecommunications infrastructure that can only be deactivated with a physical key. While Leonard attempts to recover the device in Newark, New Jersey, he is ambushed and captured by arms dealer Drake Chivu.

C.I.A. Director Theodore Sitterson is brought up to speed on the recent development and assigns field agent Victoria Phair to recover the Condor while keeping Harry out of the investigation. Incensed, Harry breaks free from his security escort, led by Higgins, and flies to Newark in order to investigate Drake's associates.

Harry's first visit is to a biker bar known for its business association with Drake. After instigating a fight and being beaten by the patrons, Harry is rescued by Victoria. They interrogate the patrons and learn that Drake's brother is the lead mechanic at a local garage. It becomes clear that Harry and Victoria previously parted from a romantic relationship on bad terms during their training. Harry only agrees to return after helping her recover the Condor and after rescuing Leonard. After interrogating Drake's brother, Harry and Victoria learn that Drake is holding a party in a local nightclub. Enlisting Victoria's roommate, Kris, Harry and Victoria enter the nightclub. Meanwhile, Sitterson reviews Leonard's video-recorded ransom and prepares an assassin for deployment in suspicion of Harry having committed treason, much to Robertson's dismay. The assassin ambushes Harry in the nightclub's restroom while Drake captures Victoria.

Maintaining contact with their communications earpiece, Victoria gives clues to Harry while he and Kris try to locate Drake's car. The final destination leads them to an abandoned factory, where Harry is tranquilized by Drake himself before being reunited with Leonard. Harry regains consciousness and is reunited with his father, only to find himself questioned on the people aware of Harry's whereabouts. Harry only confides that he told Robertson about his last known location, with Leonard's approval. At this point, Leonard reveals to his son that he went rogue and allied himself with Drake in order to draw out the people interested in recovering the Condor, as well as the perpetrators and CIA mole responsible for Kate's death. During the business deal, Leonard demonstrates the Condor's capabilities by sabotaging China's electronics infrastructure before double-crossing the Russian customers. The Russian customers have been revealed to be responsible for purchasing Leonard's personal information and ordering Kate's death, while Leonard has Harry fatally shoot the Russian ringleader.

After seemingly tying up the loose end, Robertson and Higgins intercept the Turners, with Robertson revealing himself as the mole responsible for Leonard's blown cover, and also responsible for the recent assassination attempt on Harry. Robertson fatally shoots Leonard in the stomach. Victoria breaks free from captivity and shoots at Drake's henchmen while Higgins engages Drake in hand-to-hand combat. Harry engages in a car chase with Robertson and fatally wounds him with a vehicle collision. Shortly after recovering the Condor, Harry destroys the device with an assault rifle to prevent it from falling to enemy hands and mourns his father's death before leaving the scene with Higgins, Victoria, and Kris.

During the aftermath, Harry gives Victoria a phone call to rekindle their romance before killing Drake with a car bomb.

== Cast ==
- Kellan Lutz as Harry Turner
- Bruce Willis as Leonard Turner
- Gina Carano as Victoria Phair
- D. B. Sweeney as Ken Robertson
- Dan Bilzerian as Higgins
- Steve Coulter as Theodore Sitterson
- Christopher Rob Bowen as Nick Purvis
- Joshua Mikel as Drake Chivu
- Nicholas M. Loeb as Vinn Chivu
- Summer Altice as Denise
- Lydia Hull as Kris
- Tyler Jon Olson as Darryl
- Richie Chance as John
- Lindsey Pelas as Stephanie

== Production ==
On January 20, 2015, it was announced that Bruce Willis would be starring in the film, Steven C. Miller was set to direct the film based on the script by Umair Aleem. Randall Emmett and George Furla's Emmett/Furla/Oasis Films would produce along with Adam Goldworm's Aperture Entertainment.

=== Filming ===
Principal photography on the film began on February 9, 2015, in Mobile, Alabama. Filming wrapped on March 15, 2015.

== Release ==
The film was released on December 18, 2015, in a limited release, and through video on demand by Lionsgate Premiere.

=== Box office ===
As of February 7, 2026, Extraction grossed $1,063,836 in the United Arab Emirates, Kuwait, Lebanon, Oman, Portugal, Russia, Turkey, the United States, Taiwan, Vietnam, and Thailand, and $3,469,462 in home video sales.

=== Home media ===
Extraction was released on DVD and Blu-ray in the United States on February 23, 2016.

== Critical reception ==
On the review aggregator website Rotten Tomatoes, 6% of 18 critics' reviews are positive, with an average rating of 3.5/10. Metacritic, which uses a weighted average, assigned the film a score of 25 out of 100, based on 6 critics, indicating "generally unfavorable" reviews.

== See also ==
- Bruce Willis filmography
