= Adam Goldworm =

American talent manager / film producer

Adam Goldworm (born April 1, 1978) is an American film and television producer and talent manager. He is the founder of Aperture Entertainment, a management and production company established in 2009. His producing credits include My Friend Dahmer, Vice, The Prince, and Satanic Panic, and his television credits include the anthology series Masters of Horror, Masters of Science Fiction, and Fear Itself.

== Early life and education ==
Goldworm was born in Philadelphia, Pennsylvania, and grew up in Cherry Hill, New Jersey, where he attended Cherry Hill High School East. He graduated cum laude from the UCLA School of Theater, Film and Television in 1998 and received an MBA from the Haas School of Business at the University of California, Berkeley, in 2003. During his time at Berkeley, Goldworm taught film classes to undergraduate students. ,

Then early on his career, he worked at Variety and ‘‘Daily Variety’’, as an intern.

== Career ==
Goldworm worked at Industry Entertainment, where he was involved in television production. His television producing credits included the Showtime anthology Masters of Horror, ABC’s Masters of Science Fiction, and the NBC anthology Fear Itself.

In 2008, The Hollywood Reporter included Goldworm in its annual Next Generation list of entertainment executives under the age of 35.

Goldworm founded Aperture Entertainment in 2009 as a management and production company.

During the 2010s, Goldworm produced the 2014 action thriller The Prince and the 2015 science-fiction film Vice. He also served as an executive producer on the 2015 films The Last Witch Hunter and Heist.

In 2017, Goldworm produced My Friend Dahmer, written and directed by Marc Meyers and based on Derf Backderf’s graphic novel about Jeffrey Dahmer’s adolescence. The film starred Ross Lynch, Alex Wolff, Anne Heche and Dallas Roberts. It premiered at the Tribeca Festival, and FilmRise subsequently acquired North American distribution rights.

In 2019, Goldworm produced the horror comedy Satanic Panic, directed by Chelsea Stardust from a screenplay by Grady Hendrix. He subsequently served as an executive producer on films including Line of Duty (2019), Best Sellers (2021), Monstrous (2022), and Dead Mail (2024).

Goldworm has also developed adaptations of literary and graphic-novel properties, including Ezra Claytan Daniels’ graphic novel Upgrade Soul.

=== Work with Grady Hendrix ===
Goldworm is the manager and producing partner of author Grady Hendrix. In a 2024 profile of Hendrix, Publishers Weekly reported that all but one of Hendrix’s books had been optioned for screen adaptations.

Their work together has included Satanic Panic and the development of screen adaptations of Hendrix’s fiction. In 2024, Sony acquired Hendrix’s short story Ankle Snatcher, with Hendrix producing alongside Escape Artists and Goldworm through Aperture Entertainment.

In 2025, Netflix acquired Hendrix’s short story The Blanks for a feature adaptation, with 21 Laps Entertainment’s Shawn Levy and Dan Levine producing alongside Goldworm. Then, In 2026, Searchlight Pictures acquired Hendrix’s Horrorstör, with Jonathan Levine attached to write and direct and Goldworm among the producers.

=== Other projects ===
Goldworm is a producer on Netflix’s planned historical film about the Carthaginian general Hannibal, directed by Antoine Fuqua, written by John Logan, and starring Denzel Washington. Netflix announced the project in November 2023, naming Fuqua, Washington, Erik Olsen and Goldworm as producers.

== Selected filmography ==
=== Film ===
Film	Year	Credit
Luckytown	2000	Executive producer
Automaton Transfusion	2008	Executive producer
Red White & Blue	2010	Executive producer
Silent Night	2012	Executive producer
The Prince	2014	Producer
Vice	2015	Producer
Extraction	2015	Producer
The Last Witch Hunter	2015	Executive producer
Heist	2015	Executive producer
Holidays	2016	Executive producer
Fashionista	2016	Executive producer
Johnny Frank Garrett's Last Word	2016	Executive producer
My Friend Dahmer	2017	Producer
Satanic Panic	2019	Producer
Line of Duty	2019	Executive producer
Best Sellers	2021	Executive producer
Monstrous	2022	Executive producer
Dead Mail	2024	Executive producer

=== Television ===
Series	Year	Credit
Masters of Horror	2005–2007	Producer
Masters of Science Fiction	2007	Producer
Fear Itself	2008	Producer

== See also ==
Aperture Entertainment
