= Thomas de Zengotita =

Thomas de Zengotita (1943 – 2024) was a teacher, author, and contributing editor at Harper's Magazine. He held a Ph.D. in anthropology from Columbia University and taught at the Dalton School for decades, and New York University. His book Mediated: How the Media Shapes Your World and the Way You Live in It (2005) won the Marshall McLuhan award in 2006 and again in 2010. He co-wrote the narration for a film directed by Adrian Grenier titled Teenage Paparazzo.

His second book, Postmodern Theory and Progressive Politics: Toward New Humanism, was published by Palgrave Macmillan in 2018. He was last at work on a book called Toward a New Foundation for Human Rights: a Phenomenological Approach.

De Zengotita graduated from Columbia University in 1973 and received his Ph.D. in 1992. At college, he was roommates with the paleontologist, Niles Eldredge, who proposed the theory of punctuated equilibrium in 1972, in Carman Hall.
