= Bunny Gibson =

American actress and dancer (born 1946)

- Born: Kathleen Elizabeth Gibson; January 19, 1946 (age 80); Jersey City, New Jersey
- Occupation: Actress
- Years active: 1959–present

Kathleen Elizabeth "Bunny" Gibson (born January 19, 1946) is an American actress and dancer on the American Bandstand television program. Teen magazines referred to her as "American Bandstand's Sweetheart" and Dick Clark called her a "national symbol" receiving thousands of letters each week.

== Early life ==
Kathleen Elizabeth Gibson was born in 1946 in Jersey City, New Jersey, and grew up in Darby, Pennsylvania near Philadelphia. Gibson started attending American Bandstand when she was thirteen years old, and was a regular dancer on the show from 1959 through 1961. She attended several Catholic schools in and near the Philadelphia area, and graduated from Northeast High School.

She also studied acting in New York with Warren Robertson, Stella Adler and Herbert Berghof.

== Career ==
=== American Bandstand ===
She was introduced to American Bandstand as a 13-year-old when Bandstand regular, Arlene Sullivan, and her dance partner, Kenny Rossi, appeared at a swim club near her home, attracting a throng of screaming teenagers. When a friend told her who the dancers were, Gibson began watching the show and practiced the jitterbug with her refrigerator door. She made her first appearance on the show at the age of 13 so she could meet her idol, Philadelphia singer Bobby Rydell.

Gibson soon became a regular dancer on the show and remained until 1961. Her regular dance partner was Eddie Kelly but she also danced with Steve Colanero, Johnny Alamia and Jay Jacovini. She had many fan clubs across the country and was listed in teen magazines' "popularity contests" alongside stars such as Elvis Presley, Frankie Avalon, Chubby Checker and Connie Francis. Gibson was regularly featured in articles in the most popular teen magazines of the day, such as 16, Dig and Teen Screen. Bandstand host Dick Clark once announced on air that Gibson had been named "Queen of the Shasta" by U.S. Navy men stationed aboard that ship.

Gibson would to tease her hair into a bouffant for American Bandstand, and in 2016 was invited to be a special guest at the Philadelphia VIP viewing party for Hairspray Live!, a show known for its big hair.

=== Acting ===
Gibson was an award-winning sculptor and did commercials in New York, including five national spots for Minute Rice. She also did commercials for Charmin, Panasonic, Acme Markets and McDonald's.

She moved to Los Angeles in 1983 to pursue her acting career. As Kathleen Klein, she eventually landed a role as Megan on ABC-TV's General Hospital. In the early 1990s, she appeared in two episodes of the Showtime series, Compromising Situations, and played a hard, cigar-smoking saloon operator in the film Rollerblade Warriors. She has also appeared in the movie No Ordinary Love (1997). "Dancing is our drug of Choice" Program receiving a Proclamation from the City of Philadelphia declaring "Dancing is our drug of Choice" day. The program continues today under her "Devoted to Youth" foundation where Bunny acts as the Vice President giving "Dance Contests" throughout Los Angeles for underprivileged children.

In 2010, Gibson was the lead dancer in the conga line scene of The Back-up Plan starring Jennifer Lopez. Other recent films in which she's had roles include Scout's Honor with Fred Willard, The Rainbow Tribe, I'm Going to Kill Leonard Riley, Creepshow 3, Karla, Betrothed, American Beach House, Shangri-La Suite and Allison's Choice.

Gibson's TV appearances include roles on Glee, Two and a Half Men, How I Met Your Mother, The Haunted Hathaways, and The Protector. Inside America's Totally Unsolved Lifestyles and America's Most Wanted (fugitive James Knoll turned himself in after he saw the show that night). She has also appeared on many news and talk shows including Good Morning America, Extra, Geraldo Rivera, Suzanne Somers, Morton Downey Jr., Crook & Chase and Joe Franklin. A leopard skin jacket that Gibson popularized on American Bandstand in 1959, was worn in the January 8, 2004, episode of the American Dreams television program by actress Vanesa Lengles. Gibson plans to donate the jacket to the State Museum of Pennsylvania.

Gibson has appeared on several American Bandstand anniversary specials, portrayed herself on the History Channel's The Century Series and was the principal dancer on the 100th episode of How I Met Your Mother (episode entitled "Suits").

Gibson also has made TV appearances on "Casual" as Mara, "Life in Pieces" as Nancy and "Un Made" as Eleanor. Without a Trace ("Strong Medicine"), CSI: Crime Scene Investigation, pilot Keep Dreaming, pilot Can't We Just Get Along?, MTV Movie Awards, Conan O'Brien, Jamie's mother on Jamie Kennedy Experiment, Moby music video for "Natural Blues", as Moby's mom, Roxy Club dancer on Saturday Night Live, and was part of Fred Willard's "MoHos Sketch Comedy Group".

Bunny was a regular in the Jewish Life Television 2019 series "Bubbies Know Best" as a "bubbie" along with actresses Linda Rich and S.J. Mendelson, and host Erin Davis. As one of the three Jewish grandmothers on the "Bubbies Know Best" dating show, Bunny Gibson had an awkwardly humorous encounter in 2019 with Zach Galifianakis when he came on the show to promote his new movie. The bubbies turned it around on him and started talking about him hypothetically marrying Bunny, whether or not he was circumcised, and the size of his penis. The Bubbies have been guests on Access Hollywood, TMZ, and Steve Harvey.

Gibson has appeared in many "Funny or Die" videos, such as "Beauty and the Beast" a video with Emma Watson and Dan Stevens, "Parent News 2: What is the Internet" with Fred Willard, "Getaway Grandmother's Club", "Ransom", "Instagram Intervention with Troilan Bellisario", "Patton Oswalt Confronts His Haters", and "Free Mammograms with Eric Andre, "The Liarist" with Haley Joel Osment and "Christmas Caroling" with Brittany Snow.

Gibson also appeared with Derek Waters as Bernie Arthur's Mother in "Comedy Central's Non-Denominational Christmas Special".

Recent Music Videos include "Rapping" French Montana's "50's & 100's" as French Montana, playing "Chary" in T.J. Stafford's "Chary". Recent Music videos include T. J. Stafford's "Chary", "Licenciado Cantinas the Movie" with Enrique Bunbury, "Falling in Reverse" with Ronnie Radke and "I Am Robert Raimon Roy".

In 1998, Peter Jennings and Todd Brewster featured Gibson in their The Century Book and The Century Book for Young People, which is used in high schools across America. In the years since, Bunny has helped many students across America with term papers comparing their life with the way things were for her.

== Charity ==
In the 1990s, Gibson founded an organization to help the homeless, Americans Sheltering America's Poor (ASAP). She converted an office into an apartment and distributed food from her car to the homeless on L.A.'s skid row.

In the late 1990s, Gibson started the "Dancing Is Our Drug of Choice" program, which continues today, conducting dance contests for foster children through the "Day of the Child."

== Personal life ==
Bunny married Don Traverelli in 1963; she was 16 and he was 21. They had two daughters, Angel and Maria. Gibson has four grandchildren.

Although Gibson had been raised Catholic, she discovered late in life through DNA tests that she was half-Ashkenazi Jew, after which she set about learning of the religion, some Yiddish language, and embracing the culture.
