= Steven C. Miller =

American film director, screenwriter and film editor

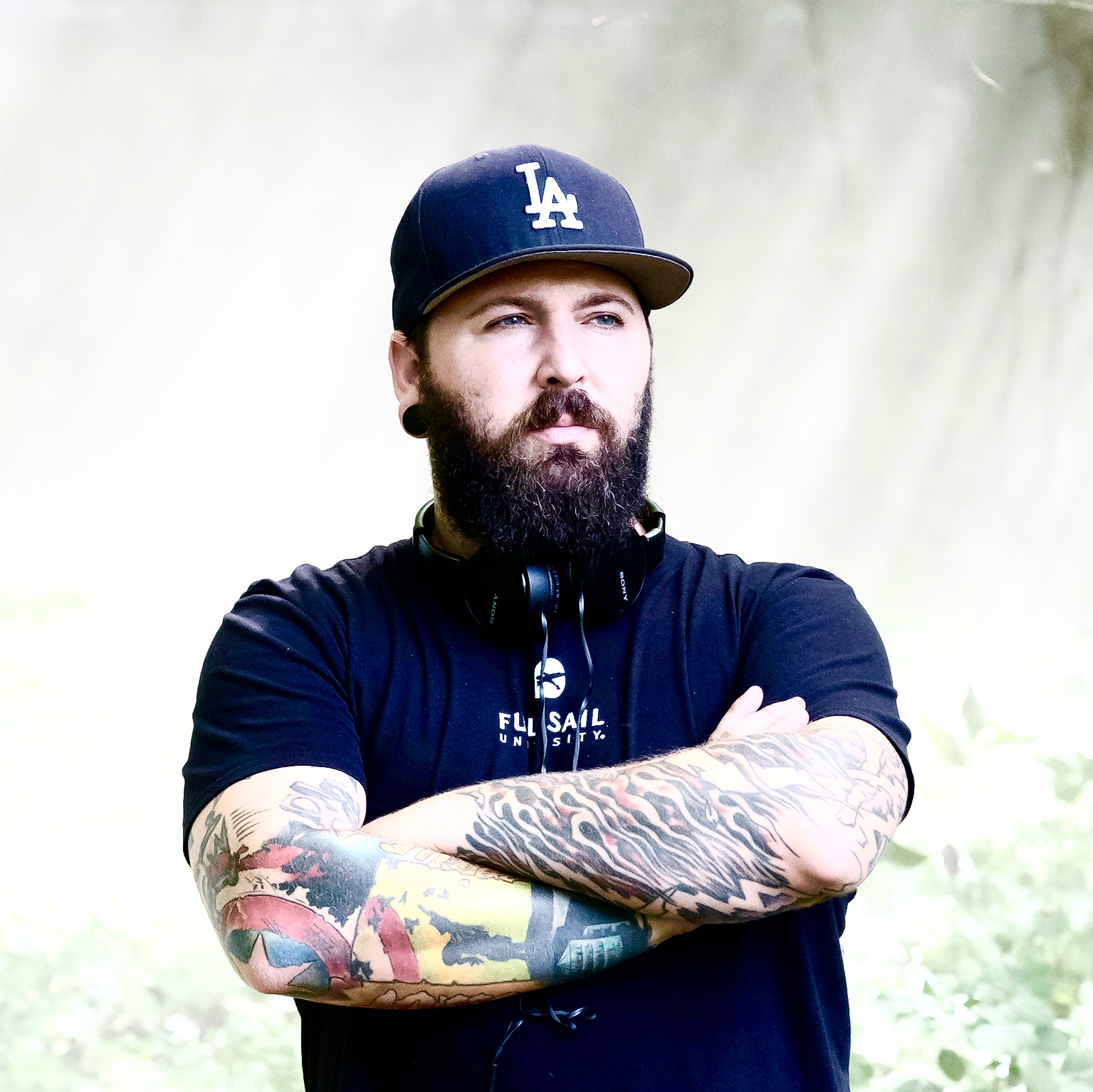
- Miller in 2016
- Born: March 8, 1981 (age 45); Decatur, Georgia, US
- Education: Full Sail University
- Occupation: Filmmaker
- Years active: 2005–present

Steven C. Miller is an American filmmaker. He has directed films in the horror and action genres, including Automaton Transfusion (2006), Silent Night (2012), Marauders (2016), Escape Plan 2: Hades (2018), and Line of Duty (2019).

== Education ==
Miller attended Full Sail University, where he majored in film and television production.

== Career ==
His feature film debut, Automaton Transfusion (2006), was made for under $15,000; it was purchased and released worldwide by Dimension Films after premiering at the 2007 Screamfest Horror Film Festival. After signing with Aperture Entertainment and United Talent Agency, Miller was attached to direct several studio films, including a cancelled MGM remake of Motel Hell (1980).

In 2011, Miller embarked on directing three more independent features. The first was the thriller The Aggression Scale (2012), described by IndieWire as "Home Alone with more death". After premiering at South by Southwest, the film was purchased by Anchor Bay Entertainment for worldwide distribution. His second project was Under the Bed (2012), referred to by JoBlo.com as "a blood-soaked horror extravaganza"; the film premiered at Fantasia Festival and was acquired for release by XLrator Media. Miller's next film was the Christmas slasher film Silent Night (2012), a remake of Silent Night, Deadly Night (1984). Fearnet stated "this straightforward and scrappy little remake is somehow more entertaining than half of what passes for 'wide release' horror movies these days." Silent Night, like The Aggression Scale, was released by Anchor Bay.

In 2015, Miller made a shift to mainstream filmmaking with four films produced by Emmett/Furla/Oasis and released by Lionsgate Premiere: Extraction (2015), Marauders (2016), Arsenal (2017) and First Kill (2017). Miller had his fifth collaboration with EFO and Lionsgate through the sequel Escape Plan 2: Hades (2018). Through these titles, Miller has collaborated several times with Bruce Willis, Nicolas Cage, John Cusack, Dave Bautista, Adrian Grenier and Johnathon Schaech. In 2019, his most well received action-thriller, Line of Duty (2019) starring Aaron Eckhart, Courtney Eaton, Ben McKenzie, and Giancarlo Esposito. The film was released with a limited theatrical run by Saban Films.

In 2022, Miller returned to horror with the smart home thriller Margaux (2022) from Paramount Pictures. Rob Hunter of Film School Rejects gave the film a positive review and wrote, "You’ll laugh, you’ll chortle, you’ll wonder why characters aren’t simply leaving out a broken window, and you won’t regret your stay."

Millers latest is the action-horror film, Werewolves, starring Frank Grillo, Lou Diamond Phillips, Ilfenesh Hadera, and Katrina Law. The film hits theaters December 6, 2024.

== Filmography ==
Year	Film	Details				
Year	Film	Distributor(s)	Budget(s)	Gross	RT	Details
2004	Suffer or Sacrifice		TBA	TBA	TBA	Short film
2006	Automaton Transfusion	Dimension Extreme	TBA	$30,000	43%	Directorial debut; also writer and actor
2011	Scream of the Banshee	After Dark Films	TBA		14%	TV movie
2012	The Aggression Scale	Anchor Bay Films	TBA	TBA	100%	Also editor
2012	Granny		TBA	TBA	TBA	Short film
2012	Under the Bed	XLrator Media	TBA	TBA	40%	Also editor
2012	Silent Night	Anchor Bay Films	TBA	$114,633	64%	Remake of Silent Night, Deadly Night
2015	Extraction	Lionsgate Premiere	TBA	$988,548	6%	
2016	Submerged	IFC Films	TBA		29%	
2016	Marauders	Lionsgate Premiere	TBA	$1 million	25%	
2017	Arsenal	Lionsgate Premiere	TBA	$41,037	3%	
2017	First Kill	Lionsgate Premiere	TBA	$347,343	13%	
2018	Escape Plan 2: Hades	Summit Entertainment	$20 million	$16.7 million	9%	Sequel to Escape Plan (2013)
2019	Line of Duty	Saban Films, Lionsgate	TBA	$640,363	59%	
2022	Margaux	Paramount Pictures	TBA		59%	
2024	Werewolves	Briarcliff Entertainment	TBA		48%	
2025	Under Fire	Vertical	TBA			

Other credits

- H. G. Wells' War of the Worlds (2005) – art department: second unit; direct-to-video
- Penance (2009) – special thanks
- Pernicious (2014) – thanks

== Music videos ==
Miller has directed music videos for the bands Blinded Black and Tokyo Rose.
