= Automaton Transfusion =

- DVD cover
- Directed by: Steven C. Miller
- Written by: Steven C Miller
- Produced by: Will Clevinger; Geoffrey James Clark; Jeremy McCormick
- Starring: Garrett Jones; Juliet Reeves; William Howard Bowman
- Cinematography: Jeff Dolen
- Distributed by: Dimension Extreme
- Release date: October 18, 2006 (Screamfest Film Festival)
- Running time: 70 minutes
- Country: United States
- Language: English
- Budget: $30,000

Automaton Transfusion is a 2006 American independent horror film written and directed by Steven C. Miller.

== Plot ==
In the early 1970s, while the majority of Americans were focused on events in Vietnam, the United States Army was secretly developing a way to resurrect and control dead bodies. Their intention was to have the dead fight instead of the living, but the experiments were shut down when the reanimated corpses were unable to control their hunger for human flesh.

Thirty years later, the army decides to reopen the project. Grover City, because of its remote location, would be the home of their main testing facilities. Without warning, the Grover City experiments go horribly wrong and the reanimated corpses go on a rampage, eating everyone in sight.

With the town overtaken by zombies, a group of High School seniors takes it upon themselves to fight back and find a cure for the disease.

== Cast ==
- Garrett Jones as Chris
- Juliet Reeves as Jackie
- William Howard Bowman as Scott
- Rowan Bousaid as Tim
- Ashley Elizabeth Pierce as Simone
- Kendra Farner as Melissa
- Joel Ezra Hebner as Lance
- Kevin J. O'Neill as Dr. Swartz
- John Youmans as The Bartender
- Larry Miller as Lee
- Jeff Denton as Jon
- Chris Shepardson as Charles
- Jason Brague as Matty
- James Anlage as Zombie

== Production and release ==
The film was shot on location in Orlando, Florida on an estimated budget of $30,000. It is intended to be the first of a trilogy of horror films and emulates classic examples of the genre; however, as of 2026, no sequel has been made. The film was purchased and released by Dimension Extreme, the straight-to-DVD genre arm of The Weinstein Company.

== Reception ==
Rotten Tomatoes, a review aggregator, reports that 38% of eight surveyed critics gave the film a positive review; the average rating was 5.3/10. Brad Miska of Bloody Disgusting praised the film, giving it a 3½ out of 5, and closing his review with, "Even with its low budget flaws, Automaton Transfusion is the Holy Grail of true independent horror films. After sifting through buckets and buckets of pure sh-t, it's such a relief to finally get that slice of pie I've been longing for. Steven C. Miller will be a household name by the end of 2007, you just watch, Automaton Transfusion is only the beginning". In a review for DVD Verdict, Gordon Sullivan commended the gore and the ingenuity of the filmmakers considering their lack of money and time, but also criticized many aspects (such as the pacing, picture quality, and plot) of the film, and stated, "It feels like a video game: get the chainsaw power-up, go to the school gym, kill the zombies, get the serum. In a video game, this might be fun, but these characters aren't particularly well-drawn, so following them around a poorly-established town isn't very enjoyable". Dread Central's Steve Barton awarded a 2½ out of 5, and said, "Automaton Transfusion does a few things right, but sadly it gets most things wrong" and "I can't help but feel a bit queasy as the scent of missed opportunity permeates the air. I wanted to love this movie. I wanted this to be the next big thing. It just wasn't". Fellow Dread Central reviewer Joshua Siebalt gave Automaton Transfusion an even lower score of 1½, and called it an unimaginative "Hot Topic horror film" and "trainwreck" that consisted of almost nothing but one-dimensional characters "running and bleeding".
