= Lindsey Pelas =

American model and actress

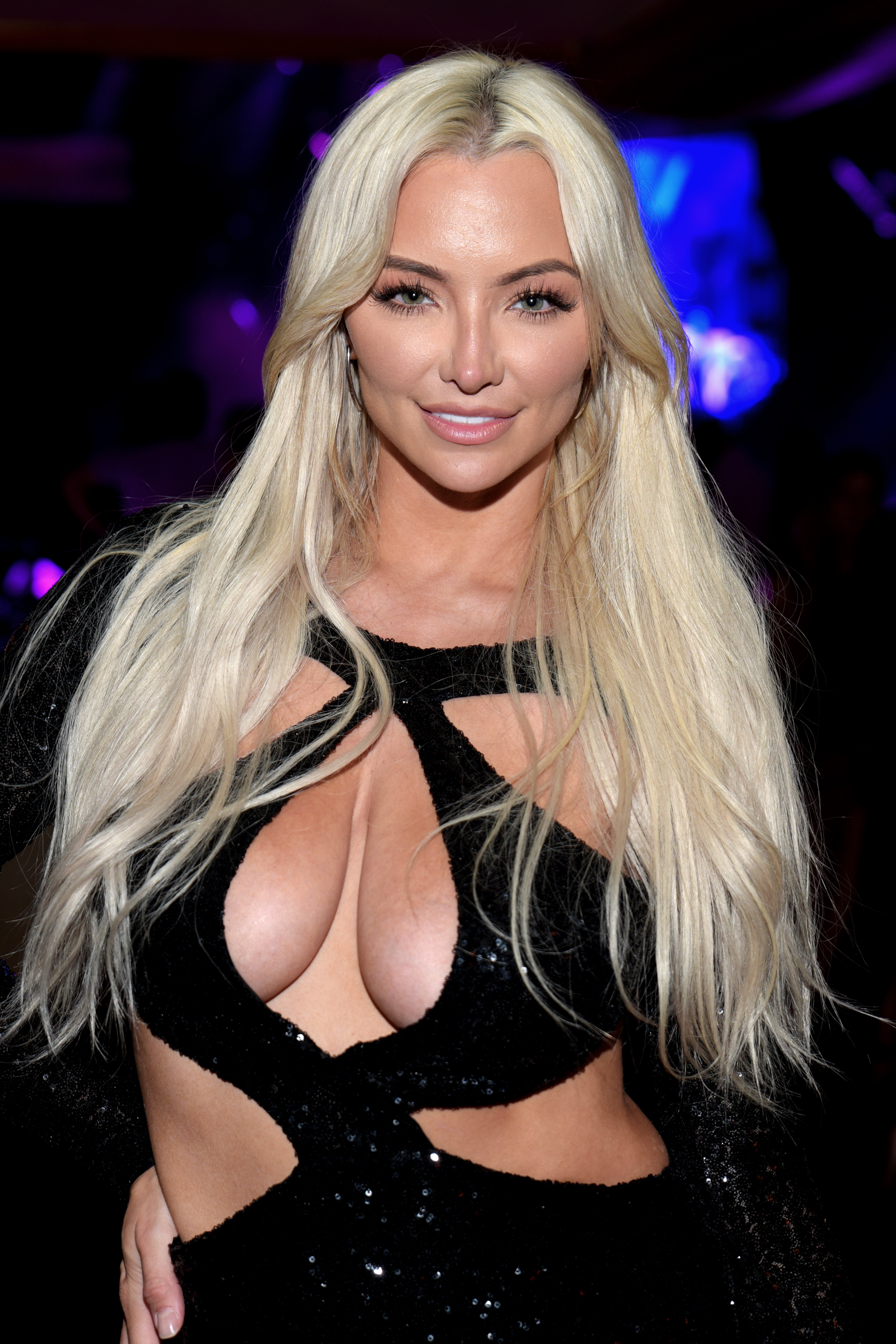
- Pelas in 2018
- Born: Baton Rouge, Louisiana, U.S.
- Education: Louisiana State University (BA)
- Occupations: Model; actress
- Years active: 2013–present
- Modeling information
- Height: 160 cm (5 ft 3 in)
- Hair color: Blonde
- Eye color: Green
- Website: lindseypelas.com

Lindsey Pelas is an American model, actress and social media personality.

== Early life ==
Lindsey Pelas was born in Baton Rouge, Louisiana. She attended Louisiana State University, graduating with a bachelor's degree in history.

== Career ==
Pelas moved to Los Angeles to begin her modeling career, she has worked for multiple brands such as Bang Energy and Fashion Nova, and has also appeared in publications such as Maxim, Playboy, Esquire, GQ, Sports Illustrated, Glamour, among others. Pelas is well known for her presence on social networks such as Facebook, Instagram, Twitter and Snapchat, where she has garnered millions of followers. Pelas was named Playboy Cyber Girl of the Month for May 2014.

Pelas made her film debut in the action thriller Extraction (2015). In 2018, Pelas had a role in the fourth season of the television series The Bay, she also launched her podcast "Eyes Up Here", a weekly podcast with celebrity guests, which appeared on the top 200 iTunes charts. In 2022, Pelas appeared in the horror thriller Alone at Night, and subsequently appeared in the action horror The Curse of the Clown Motel (2023), followed by a role in the TV series Paper Empire (2024).

== Filmography ==
Film roles
Year	Title	Role	Notes
2015	Extraction	Stephanie	
2022	Alone at Night	Herself	
2023	The Curse of the Clown Motel	Cocktail Waitress	
TBA	Hollywood Heist		Post-production
TBA	The Trouble with Billy	Katrina	Post-production

Television roles
Year	Title	Role	Notes
2018	The Bay	Bianca	Season 4; 2 episodes
2024	Paper Empire	Venus	Season 1; 3 episodes
2026	Euphoria	Woman in office with G	Season 3; episode 8: "In God We Trust"

Music videos
Year	Title	Artist	Album
2015	"Thunda Thighs"	Fitty Smallz	Non-album singles
2017	"Xxpensive"	Erika Jayne	Non-album singles
