= Jessica Lu =

American actress

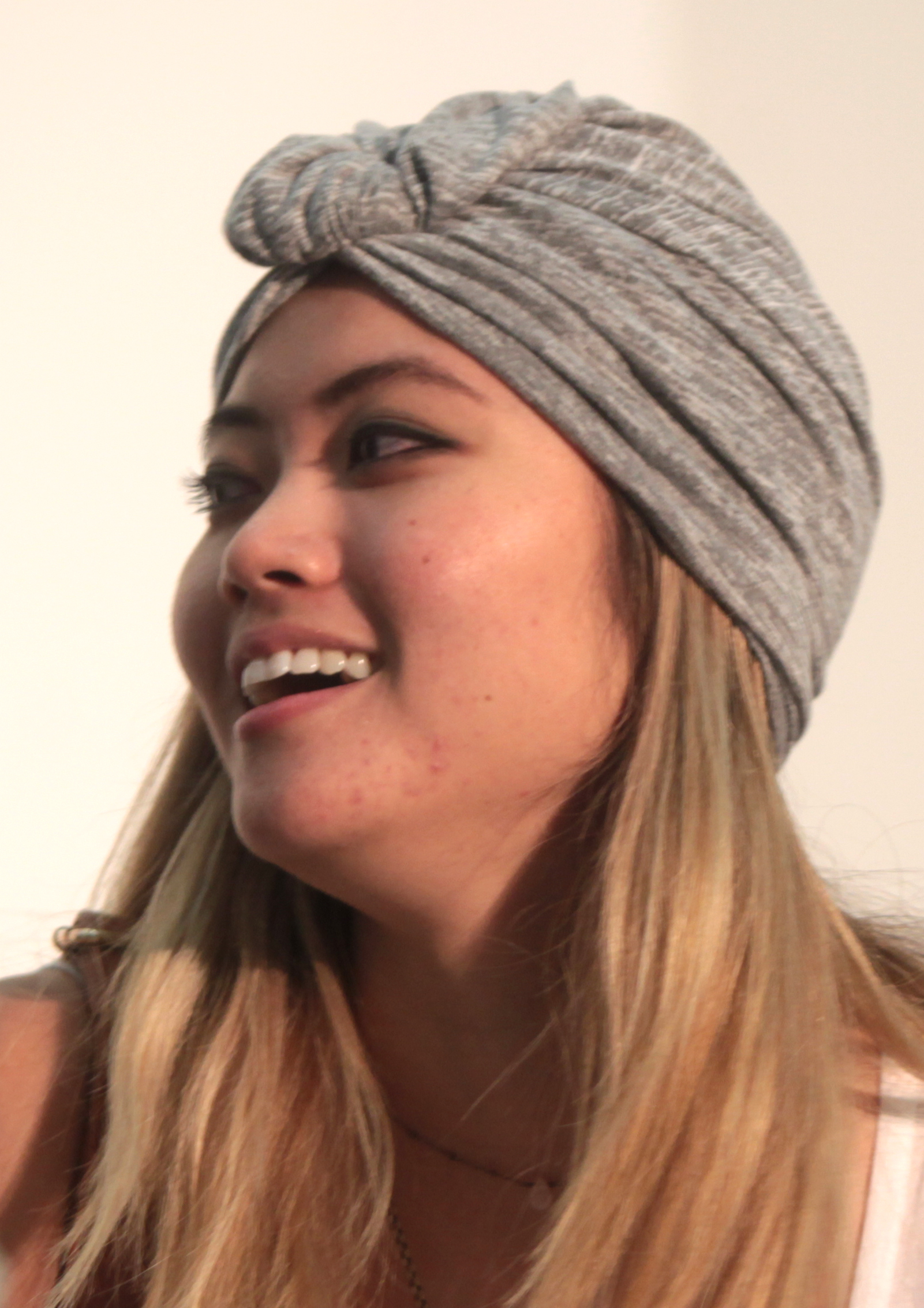
- Jessica Lu in 2014
- Born: Schaumburg, Illinois, U.S.
- Education: Columbia College Chicago
- Occupation: Actress
- Years active: 2009–present

Jessica Lu is an American actress. She is best known for her portrayal of Ming Huang on the MTV television series Awkward.

== Early life ==
Jessica Lu was born and raised in Schaumburg, a northwest suburb of Chicago, Illinois. Her parents are from South Korea, with her father being Chinese and Japanese, and her mother Chinese. They speak English, Mandarin and Korean at home. Her father is a photographer, and her mother, a singer. After arriving in the United States, they established a restaurant in Chicago.

Lu has been a natural performer since early childhood. At 6 years old, she started dancing, specializing in ballet, tap, and jazz. After watching Kristi Yamaguchi and Michelle Kwan compete in the 1992 Olympics, she pursued figure skating and took private lessons at 4am every morning before school. She also had singing, piano, and violin lessons. With her parents’ restaurant as her stage with a daily rotating audience, Jessica would entertain each table with a theatrical reading, violin playing, a tap dance, or a song.

After starting modeling and acting, she became a sought after child talent in Chicago. By the time she was 10 years old, she had worked on ad campaigns such as Calvin Klein, Oshkosh, Marshall Field's, Got Milk?, and Chicago Place, as well as commercials for McDonald's, Ford Motors, Orville Redenbacher's, Samsung, and Kaiser Permanente.

Lu graduated with honors from Columbia College Chicago with a degree in Musical Theater Performance.

== Career ==
Lu moved to Los Angeles, California in 2008. Soon after, she was cast in the role of Ming Huang on the critically acclaimed MTV series Awkward. Other work followed, in both drama and comedy, including roles such as an insufferable hipster opposite Kathy Bates on FX's American Horror Story: Hotel, for which Popsugar listed her as one of “The 25 Best American Horror Story Guest Stars”; an upscale escort opposite Tim Robbins on HBO's Here and Now, with a performance that The A.V. Club wrote was “one of the subtlest, best motivated characters”; an adoring admirer opposite Ashton Kutcher and Jon Cryer on CBS's Two and a Half Men; and a lovesick teenager with a terminal illness on FOX's Red Band Society.

In 2018, Lu played tech genius CEO Alexis Barrett on NBC's Reverie, starring alongside Sarah Shahi, Dennis Haysbert, Sendhil Ramamurthy and Kathryn Morris. IndieWire called her a “promising scene stealer” in the pilot episode. SYFYWIRE, as well as other fan sites, expressed their appreciation for Lu's performance week after week, and she quickly became a favorite character. TVLine gave her a "Performer of the Week" honorary mention by the last episode of the first season, for her “tender performance”. Jessica co-starred on the CBS television drama God Friended Me as Joy.

== Filmography ==
Film roles
Year	Title	Role	Notes
2010	Mortal Kombat: Rebirth	Whitney	Short film
2014	About Last Night	Ad executive	
2019	Line of Duty	Clover	

Television roles
Year	Title	Role	Notes
2009	Life	Riceburner Girlfriend	Episode: "Re-Entry"
2009	90210	Catholic School Girl #2	Episode: "The Dionysian Debacle"
2009	CSI: Crime Scene Investigation	Lily	Episode: "Appendicitement"
2010	Law & Order: LA	Kai Ng	Episode: "Hollywood"
2011–2014	Awkward	Ming Huang	Recurring role (seasons 1–2); main cast (season 3)
2012	The New Normal	Tabitha	Episode: Pilot
2014	Two and a Half Men	Jean	Episode: "Alan Shot a Girl"
2014	Salvation	Hayley Stern	TV movie
2015	Red Band Society	Mae	2 episodes
2015	Weird Loners	Molly	Episode: "Pilot"
2015–2016	American Horror Story: Hotel	Bronwyn	2 episodes
2018	Reverie	Alexis Barrett	Main cast
2019–2020	God Friended Me	Joy	Guest star (season 1), recurring role (season 2)

Web series roles
Year	Title	Role	Notes
2013–2014	Storytellers	Mai Himura	Main cast (season 1)
2015	Saving the Human Race	Emma Carlsen	Main cast (Season 1)

=== Theater ===
- Flower Drum Song — Lead
- West Side Story — Supporting
- Ragtime! — Supporting/Ensemble
