= Dog Eat Dog (2016 film) =

- Directed by: Paul Schrader
- Screenplay by: Matthew Wilder
- Based on: Dog Eat Dog by Edward Bunker
- Produced by: Mark Earl Burman; Gary Hamilton; Brian Beckmann; David Hillary
- Starring: Nicolas Cage; Willem Dafoe
- Cinematography: Alexander Dynan
- Edited by: Ben Rodriguez Jr.
- Music by: Deantoni Parks; Nicci Kasper
- Production companies: Blue Budgie Films; Roxwell Films; Arclight Films; Pure Dopamine; Ingenious Media; Shanghai Gigantic Pictures
- Distributed by: RLJ Entertainment
- Release dates: May 20, 2016 (Cannes); November 4, 2016 (United States)
- Running time: 93 minutes
- Country: United States
- Language: English
- Box office: $184,404

Dog Eat Dog is a 2016 American action thriller film directed by Paul Schrader with a screenplay by Matthew Wilder, based on Edward Bunker's 1995 novel of the same name. The film stars Nicolas Cage and Willem Dafoe.

The film was the closing entry for the Directors' Fortnight section at the 2016 Cannes Film Festival.

== Plot ==
Three former prisoners - Troy, Mad Dog and Diesel - are hired to kidnap a baby and share a big ransom payment.

== Cast ==
- Nicolas Cage as Troy
- Willem Dafoe as Mad Dog
- Christopher Matthew Cook as Diesel
- Omar Dorsey as Moon Man
- Paul Schrader as Grecco the Greek
- Louisa Krause as Zoe
- Melissa Bolona as Lina
- Chelcie Melton as Sheila
- Chelsea Mee as Madeleine
- John Patrick Jordan as Jack Cates
- Nicky Whelan as Daniece
- Magi Avila as Nanny Carmen
- Jeff Hilliard as Gun Enthusiast
- Sam Caminero as Dan Rubin

== Production ==
Principal photography on the film began on October 19, 2015 in Cleveland, Ohio. Filming also took place in Sheffield Lake, and it ended on November 23, 2015.

== Release ==
The film had its premiere as the closing entry for the Directors' Fortnight section at the 2016 Cannes Film Festival on May 20, 2016. It was released on November 4, 2016 in the United States.

== Reception ==
On review aggregator website Rotten Tomatoes, the film holds an approval rating of 51% based on 71 reviews, with an average rating of 5.06/10. The website's critical consensus reads, "Dog Eat Dog's refreshing bundle of quirks and surfeit of visual style aren't quite enough to compensate for an aimlessly forgettable story." On Metacritic, the film has a weighted average score of 53 out of 100, based on 19 critics, indicating "mixed or average" reviews.

Peter Bradshaw of The Guardian gave the film 4 out of 5 stars, writing, "It's the right director for the right project and the result is Schrader's best for years: a lairy, nasty, tasty crime thriller built on black-comic chaos." Todd McCarthy of The Hollywood Reporter wrote, "A rare film to have been shot in Cleveland, Dog Eat Dog definitely looks like it was shot on the cheap but puts what it needs to up on the screen with vigor and wit." Jesse Cataldo of Slant Magazine gave the film 1.5 out of 4 stars and commented that "The film has a few thrilling moments, but its pleasures are fleeting and always balanced by oppressive ugliness, representing an even deeper dive into a dismal new aesthetic founded on chaos rather than contemplation."
