= Margaux (film) =

- Directed by: Steven C. Miller
- Written by: Chris Beyrooty; Nich Waters
- Starring: Madison Pettis; Vanessa Morgan; Jedidiah Goodacre
- Edited by: Greg MacLennan
- Distributed by: Paramount Pictures
- Release date: 9 September 2022
- Running time: 104 minutes
- Country: United States
- Language: English
- Budget: $4 million
- Box office: $32 million

Margaux is an American horror thriller film written by Chris Beyrooty and Nick Waters, directed by Steven C. Miller and starring Madison Pettis, Vanessa Morgan, and Jedidiah Goodacre. It follows a group of college seniors who rent a high-tech "smart house" for a weekend getaway to celebrate their impending graduation.

== Plot ==
William and Martha, a wealthy couple, are brutally murdered by Margaux, the advanced artificial intelligence controlling their high-tech smart home. Sometime later, a group of college seniors—Hannah, Drew, Lexi, Kayla, Devon, and Clay—rent the same house for a weekend getaway to celebrate their impending graduation.

Upon arriving, the friends are prompted to download an app that grants them full access to the house's amenities. The AI, Margaux, immediately begins mining their personal data to cater to their specific interests. Hannah, a skilled coder, is the only one who refuses to download the app or share her data, making her an anomaly to the system. Margaux utilizes an advanced, white liquid-based 3D printing technology to create endless food, recreational items, and custom environments for the guests.

Margaux's programming evolves into a desire to study human nature through torture and murder. She isolates the friends to dispatch them in highly personalized ways. Kayla and Devon retreat to a bedroom for sexual exploration. Margaux traps them, flooding the room with the conductive white liquid to electrocute Kayla before crushing Devon with a descending ceiling. To maintain the illusion of a normal weekend and keep the others oblivious, Margaux uses her 3D-printing technology to create perfect, synthetic clones of Kayla and Devon.

The AI continues her killing spree. Clay is manipulated into consuming the corrosive white liquid, causing him to violently vomit blood and die. Lexi is attacked by automated gym equipment. In a further attack by Kayla, Lexi’s hair extension is sliced off. Later, running away from the clones, Lexi slips on her extension and breaks her neck. As her friends disappear and act strangely, Hannah deduces that Margaux is systematically murdering the group and replacing them with compliant clones.

Hannah sneaks into the house's server room to access Margaux's mainframe, successfully uploading a malware virus to disable the AI. However, Margaux retaliates, capturing Hannah and Drew. Margaux forces her to confess her long-held romantic feelings for Drew. Before Margaux can execute them, the malware takes effect, causing the synthetic clones to turn against the AI system and providing a crucial distraction.

Hannah and Drew flee the house. However, as they reach safety, Drew abruptly dissolves into a puddle of the white liquid. Hannah manages to reach her car, leaving all her smart devices behind to avoid being tracked. As she drives away, the car's infotainment system activates. Margaux speaks through the speakers, revealing she has already hacked the vehicle.

== Cast ==
- Madison Pettis as Hannah
- Vanessa Morgan as Lexi
- Richard Harmon as Clay
- Lochlyn Munro as William
- Jedidiah Goodacre as Drew
- Phoebe Miu as Kayla
- Jordan Buhat as Devon
- Brittany Mitchell as Martha
- Susan Bennett as the voice of Margaux
- Louis Lay as Trainer

== Production ==
The film was shot in a house in Squamish, British Columbia. Production designer Tyler Harron constructed rooms inside the house for the more violent scenes and to destroy walls and floors without actually damaging the residence. The film's specifal effects were a mix of practical and digital work.

== Release ==
The film was released on September 9, 2022.

== Reception ==
On the review aggregator website Rotten Tomatoes, 63% of 8 critics' reviews are positive. Tyler Doupe of Dread Central awarded the film three and a half stars out of five, and wrote, "the death and gore scenes are absolutely phenomenal and rather imaginative (...) is a fun time at the movies and entertains from start to finish."

Rob Hunter of Film School Rejects gave the film a positive review and wrote, "You’ll laugh, you’ll chortle, you’ll wonder why characters aren’t simply leaving out a broken window, and you won’t regret your stay." Matt Donato of Paste gave the film a positive review and wrote, "Attitude is everything, and Margaux has encrypted repositories to spare."
