= The Face of an Angel =

2014 British psychological thriller

- Theatrical release poster
- Directed by: Michael Winterbottom
- Written by: Paul Viragh
- Based on: Angel Face by Barbie Latza Nadeau
- Produced by: Melissa Parmenter
- Starring: Daniel Brühl; Kate Beckinsale; Valerio Mastandrea; Cara Delevingne
- Cinematography: Hubert Taczanowski
- Edited by: Marc Richardson
- Production companies: BBC Films; Cattleya; Multitrade; Revolution Films; Vedette Finance; Ypsilon Films
- Distributed by: Soda Pictures
- Release dates: 6 September 2014 (Toronto International Film Festival); 27 March 2015
- Running time: 101 minutes
- Countries: United Kingdom; Italy; Spain
- Language: English

The Face of an Angel is a 2014 psychological thriller directed by Michael Winterbottom and written by Paul Viragh. The film was inspired by the book Angel Face, drawn from crime coverage by Newsweek/Daily Beast writer Barbie Latza Nadeau. The film stars Kate Beckinsale, Daniel Brühl, and Cara Delevingne. The film is based on the real-life story of the murder of Meredith Kercher in 2007.

== Cast ==
- Daniel Brühl as Thomas
- Kate Beckinsale as Simone Ford
- Valerio Mastandrea as Edoardo
- Cara Delevingne as Melanie
- Ava Acres as Bea
- Genevieve Gaunt as Jessica Fuller
- Sai Bennett as Elizabeth Pryce
- Ranieri Menicori as Carlo Elias
- Andrea Tidona as Pubblico Ministero Alberto Baldini
- Peter Sullivan as James Pryce
- Corrado Invernizzi as Francesco
- Edoardo Gabbriellini as Roberto
- Roberta Cartocci as Maria Argento
- John Hopkins as Joe
- Sara Stewart as Sarah
- Rufus Wright as William
- Rosie Fellner as Katherine
- Nathan Stewart-Jarrett as Adam
- Lucy Chou as Caroline
- Sophie Rundle as Hannah
- Alistair Petrie as Steve
- Nikki Amuka-Bird as Roxanne
- Luigi De Mossi as Jessica's lawyer

== Production ==
The Face of an Angel was executively produced by Eric Anidjar, Leon Benarroch, Andrew Eaton, Jordan Gertner, Chris Hanley, Susana Hornil, Anthony Jabre, Christine Langan, Norman Merry, Roberto Mitrani, Reza Safinia, and Ed Wethered. On 6 September 2013, Daniel Brühl joined the film to lead the cast. On 10 October 2013, Cara Delevingne joined the cast of the film. On 14 October 2013, Kate Beckinsale was set to join the drama film.

Principal photography began in mid-November 2013 in Siena, Italy. On 3 February 2014, WestEnd Films showed the first promo-reel to the buyers at European Film Market in Berlin International Film Festival, when the film was in post-production.

== Reception ==
The film received negative reviews. As of December 2022, the film holds a 37% approval rating on Rotten Tomatoes, based on 51 reviews with an average score of 5.1/10. The website's critics consensus reads: "The Face of an Angel finds director Michael Winterbottom in pursuit of ideas that remain frustratingly diffuse and agonizingly out of his grasp." Metacritic, which uses a weighted average, assigned the film a score of 37 out of 100, based on 17 critics, indicating "generally unfavorable" reviews.
