= Marauders (2016 film) =

2016 film by Steven C. Miller

- Theatrical release poster
- Directed by: Steven C. Miller
- Written by: Michael Cody; Chris Sivertson
- Produced by: Randall Emmett; George Furla; Joshua Harris; Rosie Charbonneau; Mark Stewart
- Starring: Christopher Meloni; Bruce Willis; Dave Bautista; Adrian Grenier; Johnathon Schaech; Lydia Hull; Tyler Jon Olson; Texas Battle
- Cinematography: Brandon Cox
- Edited by: Vincent Tabaillon
- Music by: Ryan Dodson
- Production companies: Emmett/Furla/Oasis Films; Grindstone Entertainment Group; 4th Wall Entertainment; Lionsgate Home Entertainment
- Distributed by: Lionsgate Premiere
- Release date: July 1, 2016
- Running time: 107 minutes
- Country: United States
- Language: English
- Box office: $1 million

Marauders is a 2016 American crime film directed by Steven C. Miller and written by Michael Cody and Chris Sivertson. The film stars Christopher Meloni, Bruce Willis, Dave Bautista, and Adrian Grenier. Meloni plays an FBI agent investigating a series of brutal bank robberies that seem to be personally targeting a ruthless CEO played by Willis. Lionsgate Premiere released the film on July 1, 2016.

== Plot ==
In Cincinnati, four masked robbers steal $3 million in cash from Hubert National Bank after their leader executes point-blank the manager, Steven Hutchinson. FBI Special Agent Jonathan Montgomery leads a joint robbery-homicide investigation with the Cincinnati PD. Forensics technicians find a fingerprint matching TJ Jackson, a deceased Army Ranger. According to official reports, TJ's unit went rogue in 2011 by kidnapping civilian Alexander Hubert for ransom. The exchange failed, and Alexander and the Rangers were killed by a Special Forces team. TJ's body was never recovered. As Alexander's sole surviving heir, his brother Jeffrey Hubert became president of Hubert International. Tracking the stolen bills' serial numbers, the FBI discovers that the robbers donated the money to a City Mission charity fund.

During a second robbery at another Hubert bank, the gang steals cash and the contents of personal safe deposit boxes belonging to Hubert and Ohio Senator Cook. David Dagley, a member of Hubert's security detail, is lured to the bank and stabbed to death in an ambush. The killer leaves a bullet bearing TJ's fingerprint. Dagley had commanded the Rangers involved in Alexander's kidnapping but had not participated in the ransom scheme. Investigators discover that the getaway vehicle is registered to TJ's brother, James. Montgomery also receives photographs suggesting a homosexual affair between Hubert and Cook, while the robbers try to persuade him to investigate Hubert's corruption.

As the gang targets the Main Branch for a third robbery, its members encounter Montgomery, who is leaving after interviewing Hubert. A firefight involving high-powered rifles erupts across the lobby, followed by close-quarters combat. One robber is killed, while the other three escape into downtown traffic. Investigators discover that Hutchinson and Dagley were former members of an elite platoon associated with Cook.

Montgomery receives a file stolen from Hubert that documents a conspiracy to commit murder and cover up military wrongdoing. After the file leaks to the media, the truth emerges: Hubert and Cook conspired to prevent Alexander from taking control of the company. They provided the Rangers with false intelligence about a terrorist threat in Costa Rica. The Rangers were subsequently branded rogue agents and ambushed by a Special Forces team unaware that they had been deceived. TJ was the sole survivor, rescued by Wells, who was then a Special Forces sniper.

With his assets frozen, Hubert makes large unauthorized cash withdrawals in preparation to flee the country. The FBI tracks TJ to a concert venue and takes him into custody. Meanwhile, FBI Special Agent Wells is revealed as the robbery crew's leader, with three Special Forces members who participated in the ambush serving as his accomplices. Wells orchestrated the heists to avenge the massacre of the Rangers, in which he had participated. Recalling a crucial detail about a location on a map, Detective Mims deduces Wells's identity and finds him preparing to leave the gang's cash stash. Tormented by guilt and his wife's terminal cancer prognosis, Mims pleads with Wells to let him return the stolen money and make amends. Wells attempts to reason with him but kills him when Mims raises his weapon.

Some time later, Montgomery tracks Hubert to Tijuana, Mexico. He finds Wells preparing to kill Hubert in a restaurant and argues that the stolen money cannot bring the dead back and that many people continue to suffer because of Wells's actions. Montgomery then sits at Hubert's table, sips his wine, and stabs him with a concealed blade. Wells shoots Hubert's bodyguard, exchanges a glance with Montgomery, and leaves.

== Cast ==
- Christopher Meloni as FBI Special Agent Jonathan Montgomery
- Bruce Willis as Jeffrey Hubert
- Dave Bautista as FBI Agent Stockwell
- Adrian Grenier as FBI Special Agent Wells
- Texas Battle as Ranger T.J. Jackson
- Johnathon Schaech as Detective Brian Mims
- Lydia Hull as FBI Special Agent Lydia Chase
- Tyler Jon Olson as Detective Zach Derohan
- Christopher Rob Bowen as Bradley Teegan
- Danny A. Abeckaser as Detective Antonio Leon
- Richie Chance as Command Officer David Dagley
- Tara Holt as Reporter Vanessa Adler
- Carolyn Alise as Martha
- Chris Hill as James Jackson
- Jesse Pruett as Carl, The Bartender

== Production ==
On September 9, 2015, it was announced that Steven C. Miller would be directing a bank robbery film Marauders based on the script by Michael Cody and Chris Sivertson. Bruce Willis, Christopher Meloni, and Dave Bautista would star in the film, which Emmett/Furla/Oasis Films would finance and produce while Lionsgate Premiere would release it. Lydia Hull, Tyler Olson, Christopher Rob Bowen, and Danny A. Abeckaser would also star in the film. Randall Emmett and George Furla would produce through Emmett/Furla/Oasis Films along with Joshua Harris and Rosie Charbonneau through 4th Wall Entertainment. On September 25, 2015, Adrian Grenier joined the film.

Principal photography on the film began on September 25, 2015, in Cincinnati, Ohio. First-day filming took place at the Dixie Terminal building. On September 26, 2015, filming was underway at the Stock Yard Bank & Trust, which was transformed into Hubert National Bank. Filming also took place in Downtown Cincinnati and Over-the-Rhine through October 16.

== Release ==
Lionsgate Premiere released the film on July 1, 2016.

=== Box office ===
As of February 7, 2026, Marauders grossed $1,024,158 in Portugal, Argentina, China, and the Netherlands, and grossed $1,209,418 in home video sales.

== Reception ==
On the review aggregator website Rotten Tomatoes, 22% of 23 critics' reviews are positive, with an average rating of 4.1/10. The website's consensus reads: "From its clichéd story to Bruce Willis' rote performance, Marauders is a crime thriller content to settle for merely competent – a goal it all too rarely achieves." Metacritic, which uses a weighted average, assigned the film a score of 42 out of 100, based on 6 critics, indicating "mixed or average" reviews.

Frank Scheck of The Hollywood Reporter called it a "by-the-numbers B-movie" with slow pacing and a convoluted plot. Owen Gleiberman of Variety wrote that the film's complex plot makes less sense as it progresses because the explanations are so unbelievable.
