= First Kill (2017 film) =

2017 film by Steven C. Miller

- Official poster
- Directed by: Steven C. Miller
- Written by: Nick Gordon
- Produced by: Randall Emmett; George Furla; Mark Stewart
- Starring: Hayden Christensen; Bruce Willis; Gethin Anthony; Megan Leonard; Tyler Jon Olson; Shea Buckner; William DeMeo
- Cinematography: Brandon Cox
- Edited by: Thomas Calderon
- Music by: Ryan Franks; Scott Nickoley
- Production companies: Grindstone Entertainment Group; Brookstreet Pictures; Emmett/Furla/Oasis Films
- Distributed by: Lionsgate Premiere
- Release date: July 21, 2017 (United States)
- Running time: 97 minutes
- Country: United States
- Language: English
- Budget: $10 million
- Box office: $347,295

First Kill is a 2017 American action thriller film directed by Steven C. Miller and written by Nick Gordon. The film stars Hayden Christensen and Bruce Willis.

== Plot ==
Wall Street broker Will Beeman (Hayden Christensen) has been struggling with being present for his wife, Laura (Megan Leonard), and his son Danny (Ty Shelton). Shortly after hearing of Danny being bullied at school, Will decides to take his family to his hometown, Granville, Ohio, to bond with Danny. Upon entering Granville, Will is reacquainted with Police Chief Marvin Howell (Bruce Willis), a family friend who knew Will's father and at one point dated his aunt, Dottie (Deb G. Girdler). Howell advises Will on taking precautions after Howell informs him of a recent bank robbery in which a couple of million dollars was stolen.

While teaching Danny how to hunt with a rifle, Will and Danny witness a heated exchange between two men, one of them holding the other at gunpoint and inquiring after money at a dropoff not going according to plan. The unarmed man (Gethin Anthony) is shot in the shoulder after he throws a key near Will's position at a shooting station. Danny's shocked gasp at the shooting attracts the gunman's attention. The gunman opens fire on Will's location and prompts Will, fearing for his son's safety, to shoot him with his hunting rifle in self-defense. Upon inspecting the dead gunman, he is surprised to discover a concealed badge, which shows that the gunman was a police officer who failed to identify himself. Distraught, Will brings the wounded man to the family cabin for Laura, a surgeon, to provide first aid and hopefully to save the only other witness to the proceedings.

Shortly after he is treated and bandaged up, the man regains consciousness, takes Danny hostage at knifepoint, and demands Will to help him retrieve the discarded key in exchange for Danny's freedom. While attempting to retrieve the key back at the shooting shack, they are surprised by a uniformed officer, Richie Stechel (William DeMeo), who opens fire on Will and the gunman. The gunman tells Will to meet him at a bulletin board after he retrieves the key, and he then absconds with Will's car and son as hostage. After an attempt at pursuing his son, Will learns from Howell that the gunman's name is Levi Barrett, and that the deceased officer was Richie's brother, Charlie (Shea Buckner).

Will waits until nightfall to retrieve the key, only to be confronted by Richie. Will successfully subdues Richie, leaves him handcuffed to a tree, and goes to the bulletin board for further instructions. Meanwhile, Danny bonds with Levi and learns the reasons behind the bank robbery. Howell and the Stechel brothers engineered the heist and intended to use Levi as the fallguy. Levi agreed to the heist to support financially Mabel Fantion (Christine Dye), the cancer-ridden mother of his girlfriend Adele (Magi Avila). Levi was supposed to drop off the stolen money at a drop site, but suspecting that the cops would likely betray him, he did not arrive for fear of the site being compromised with a potential assassin. Howell also deduces Levi's predicament after a uniformed officer investigates Barrett's apartment.

Howell and Will converge on Mabel's hospital bed, and Howell questions Will's motivation for being there. While Howell is distracted with a radio call by an officer, Will receives a map from Mabel that reveals the location of the post office om which the stolen money was stashed and the location of an underground bunker at which to make the exchange for his son. The key is used to unlock the mailbox containing the stolen cash. Will briefly eludes Howell but is caught again after he retrieves the money. Seemingly sympathetic to Will's situation, Howell provides Will transport to the bunker to apprehend Levi. Will gives the money to Levi and is reunited with Danny. Simultaneous to this reunion, Richie kidnaps Laura from the family cabin and drives her to Howell's location for leverage of their own.

While attempting to flee, Adele is murdered by Howell. Left with nothing to lose, Levi attacks Howell and Richie, only to be wounded. Will takes Danny to a hunter's watchtower, where Danny soon pushes a pursuing Richie off a high ladder to knock him out (because of following good anti-bullying advice that Levi imparted to him previously while they bonded over computer games). Howell holds Laura at gunpoint and threatens to shoot her if Will does not hand over the money. Desperate to help his parents, Danny retrieves a pistol from the unconscious Richie and attempts to shoot Howell, only for Will to stop him. In an attempt to taunt Will, Howell reveals himself as the one who murdered Will's father years earlier. Levi distracts Howell while Laura ducks and provides Will the opportunity to shoot Howell in the head.

During the aftermath, Levi dies of his injuries, leaving Danny heartbroken. Richie is questioned by the rest of the police department, and Mabel is found dead on the hospital bed after she was murdered by Howell by removing her life support system. As the remaining non-corrupt officers boast on news media over the recovered loot, the Beeman family relinquishes its hunting rifle and decides to return home to deal with its daily lives.

== Cast ==
- Hayden Christensen as William "Will" Beeman
- Bruce Willis as Police Chief Marvin Howell
- Ty Shelton as Danny Beeman
- Gethin Anthony as Levi Barrett
- Megan Leonard as Laura Beeman
- Tyler Jon Olson as Officer Tom Davies
- Jesse Pruett as Officer Lewis
- Shea Buckner as Charlie Stechel
- William DeMeo as Richie Stechel
- Magi Avila as Adele Fantion
- Chris R Moss as Officer Cox
- Chelsea Mee as Tammy
- Deb G. Girdler as Aunt Dottie
- Christine Dye as Mabel Fantion

== Production ==
Principal photography on the film began in August 2016 in Granville, Ohio.

== Box office ==
As of November 11, 2022, First Kill grossed $347,295 in the United Arab Emirates, Turkey, Portugal, South Africa, Argentina, Uruguay, and Paraguay, on a budget of $10 million.

== Reception ==
On the review aggregator website Rotten Tomatoes, 15% of 20 critics' reviews are positive, with an average rating of 3.8/10. Metacritic, which uses a weighted average, assigned the film a score of 39 out of 100, based on 7 critics, indicating "generally unfavorable" reviews.

== See also ==
- Bruce Willis filmography
