= You and Me (1975 film) =

- Directed by: David Carradine
- Screenplay by: Robert Hoyt Henderson
- Produced by: Bill Record
- Starring: David Carradine; Richard Chadbourne II; Bobbie Shaw Chance
- Cinematography: Robert E. Collins
- Edited by: Philip Caplan; David Carradine; Jay Ginsberg; Paul Hunt
- Music by: David Carradine; Keith Carradine; Robert Carradine
- Production company: Billy Record Productions
- Distributed by: Filmmakers International
- Release date: June 21, 1974
- Running time: 99 minutes
- Country: United States
- Language: English

You and Me is a 1975 American film directed by David Carradine in his directorial debut and starring Carradine, Bobbi Shaw, Barbara Hershey, and Gary Busey as well as Carradine's brothers Keith Carradine and Robert Carradine.

== Premise ==
A young boy and a biker become best friends on the road.

== Cast ==
- David Carradine as Zeto
- Richard Chadbourne II as Jimmy (credited as Chipper Chadbourne)
- Bobbie Shaw Chance as Wynona (credited as Bobbi Shaw)
- Barbara Hershey as Waitress (credited as Barbara Seagull)
- Dennis Fimple as Dennis Fimple
- Keith Carradine as Death Guy
- Robert Carradine as Gas Station Attendant (credited as Bob Carradine)

== Production ==
The film was shot in the summer of 1972 but was not released until three years later. It had a budget of $63,000. Carradine called it "part motorcycle movie part Walt Disney part its own thing".

The title song of the movie, composed and sung by David Carradine, was released as a single record around 1973, and as part of Carradine's first album Grasshopper in 1975.
