= Mediated =

2005 book by Thomas de Zengotita

Mediated: How the Media Shapes Your World and the Way You Live in It
- Author: Thomas de Zengotita
- Language: English
- Genre: Non-fiction
- Publisher: Bloomsbury
- Publication date: 2005
- Publication place: United States

Mediated: How the Media Shapes Your World and the Way You Live in It is a non-fiction book by anthropologist Thomas de Zengotita published in 2005 by Bloomsbury about the effect of the media in the Western world.

== Summary ==
Mediated aims at creating awareness rather than offering ready-made solutions to remedy the intrusion of too much media in our industrial societies. Rather than writing yet another pamphlet against the media, the author chooses to focus on the mechanisms and the processes of our mediated society.

The basis of his analysis is that the opposite of reality is not phony or superficial, it is optional. We choose between options to determine who we are, to make statements to the world about who we are. People, he argues, have always done so, but the difference with today's situation is that we have a lot more options. In terms of options, comparing the modern world with the post-modern world is like comparing a breeze with a hurricane. The media forces at work since the fifties have contributed to expanding our options greatly, making the self "aware" of the possibilities to be who it deems worth being.

We have become method actors, constantly flattered. Deception is luring because it is the inherent condition of the "flattered-self". So we seek new ways of satisfying our selves. These are the true forces at work behind what de Zengotita calls the "virtual revolution".

== Reviews ==
With Mediated, Thomas de Zengotita received critical acclaim outside his field of study. The Washington Post called it "A fine roar of a lecture about how the American mind is shaped by (too much) media". O, The Oprah Magazine stated "Reading (...) Mediated is like spending time with a wild, wired friend, the kind who keeps you up late and lures you outside your comfort zone with a speed rap full of brilliant notions".
