= Creepshow 3 =

- German DVD artwork.
- Directed by: Ana Clavell; James Dudelson
- Written by: Ana Clavell; James Dudelson; Scott Frazelle; Pablo C. Pappano; Alex Ugelow
- Produced by: Ana Clavell; James Dudelson; Stanley E. Dudelson; Robert F. Dudelson
- Starring: Roy Abramsohn; Kris Allen; Magi Avila; A. J. Bowen; Elwood Carlisle; Ed Dyer; Bunny Gibson; Bo Kresic; Camille Lacey; Elina Madison; Emmett McGuire; Stephanie Pettee
- Cinematography: James M. Legoy
- Edited by: Ana Clavell
- Music by: Chris Anderson
- Production companies: Taurus Entertainment Company; Creepy Film Productions
- Distributed by: Taurus Entertainment Company
- Release dates: April 24, 2006 (Bristol, Rhode Island); May 15, 2007 (DVD premiere)
- Running time: 104 minutes
- Country: United States
- Language: English
- Budget: $3.5 million (est)

Creepshow 3 is a 2006 American comedy horror anthology film directed, produced, and co-written by Ana Clavell and James Dudelson. It is a sequel to Creepshow (1982) and Creepshow 2 (1987). The film stars Kris Allen, A. J. Bowen, Emmett McGuire and Stephanie Pettee.

While previous Creepshow segments had been written by Stephen King or based on his short stories, Creepshow 3 was made without any involvement from crew members for previous films, and all five segments are original material. Unlike in previous entries, the stories are directly connected, with some characters appearing in multiple segments. The film was panned by critics.

== Plot ==
=== Wraparound story ===
Unlike the first two Creepshow installments, in which the wraparound element linking the stories was a horror comic, Creepshow 3 takes an approach similar to Quentin Tarantino's Pulp Fiction in which characters from each story interact with each other during the film. There is also a hot dog stand as a common element in the movie. Brochures, ads, and other things from the hot dog stand are peppered throughout.

=== Alice ===
Alice Jacobs is a stuck-up, snotty teenager who comes home to find her father meddling with some kind of universal remote. Whenever he presses one of the buttons on the device, the whole family except for Alice changes ethnicity (i.e., the "Color and Hue Settings" button makes her family turn African-American, and the "Subtitles" button makes her family turn Hispanic). During this, Alice gradually mutates into what is supposedly her "true form".

Just when Alice thinks everything is back to normal, her father presses another button, revealing Alice's true form. Her family is absolutely horrified at the sight of Alice. The story ends with Professor Dayton, the mad scientist from down the street, using another remote control to turn Alice into a white rabbit. Notable in this story is the link to Lewis Carroll's Alice's Adventures in Wonderland. Victor, the vampire, makes an appearance in this story.

=== The Radio ===
Jerry is a part-time security guard who buys a radio from a homeless street vendor to replace his old one which has stopped working; however, this mysterious new radio is far from ordinary as it can have a conversation with Jerry. Very soon, Jerry is stealing money and murdering people, all at the whim of his new radio.

After escaping with a sex worker who lives in his building, Jerry is told by the radio to kill the sex worker or she will kill him. He refuses and destroys the radio. Right after, the sex worker finds his gun in the car and shoots Jerry, killing him. Moments after she kills him and wipes the gun clean, she is shot in the head. The shooter is revealed to be the pimp living in the same building as Jerry. When the pimp returns to his car, another radio tells him to go and start a new life.

Alice's father Detective Jacobs also appears in this story, investigating the various murders and strange goings-on taking place. The killer call girl, Rachael, also makes an appearance in this story, as well as the two boys from "The Professor's Wife".

=== Call Girl ===
Rachael, a murderous call girl, receives a request from a shy man named Victor, her newest client. Rachael thinks he will be just another easy victim. When Rachael gets there, scenes of a murdered family with their necks ripped out are flashed on-screen, and there is no evidence of Victor living in the house.

Rachael then chains him to the bed and proceeds to stab him in the chest, places a pillow over his face, and then has a quick shower. She then keeps hearing Victor's voice saying, "You killed me." Rachael removes the pillow and reveals a gruesome creature with a large, toothy mouth. It is then revealed that Victor is an actual vampire. He kills Rachael and hangs her in the room with the house owners whom he's already killed. The two young men from The Professor's Wife and the pimp from The Radio appear in this segment.

=== The Professor's Wife ===
Two former students come to visit Professor Dayton and meet his fiancée Kathy. Having been victims of his practical jokes in the past, they suspect that Kathy is actually a robot, which the professor has supposedly spent the last 20 years working on in his laboratory. She also behaves like a robot and does not eat or drink, which further indicates that she is probably mechanical.

When the professor is out of the house, they decide to dismantle Kathy to see what she looks like on the inside. To their utter horror, they learn that Kathy really was a human being after all and that she was a mail-order bride. The professor later buys an 'advanced' voodoo kit from the homeless street vendor during "Haunted Dog" to put Kathy back together in time for the wedding.

Dean Thompson, the grandmother from family #1 in "Alice", and Rachael, the killer call girl, make a brief appearance in this story.

=== Haunted Dog ===
A cruel, miserly doctor, Dr. Farwell, is working a 30-day court-ordered sentence at a free clinic, where he is very insolent and rude towards his patients. He even goes as far as to show no sympathy towards a young girl with a brain tumor and mocks an elderly woman who is going blind. One day, he buys a hot dog. Farwell accidentally drops it on the ground. He sadistically decides to give the dirty hot dog to a homeless man who has been bothering him for some spare change. The homeless man dies after taking one bite, and he returns to haunt Farwell. The story ends with Farwell having a heart attack from having had too many encounters with his ghostly stalker. Victor from "Call Girl" also appears in this segment, and he seems to be in cahoots with Farwell. The homeless man can be heard muttering, "Thanks for the good dog" to Dr. Farwell throughout the segment, an allusion to Creepshow 2's "The Hitch-Hiker". The Hispanic mother from family #3 in "Alice" also makes an appearance in this story.

=== Epilogue ===
It is revealed that the street vendor/homeless man got the two radios from Professor Dayton in "The Professor's Wife". After this tale ends, it then shows Professor Dayton at his wedding with his resurrected wife (who is bandaged up from being murdered in "The Professor's Wife") with a huge crowd around them. It shows Professor Dayton and his wife driving off. Alice's mom states that Alice will look so beautiful on her wedding day to which her family agrees as Alice's rabbit form is in the back seat of Professor Dayton's car. The priest asks the husband how Carol is with the response that she's not well at all and still believes that she has a daughter named Alice. It then zooms in on the back of the hot dog guy's head. He turns around, revealing that he was the Creep (resembling the version from Creepshow 2) all along.

== Cast ==
"Alice"

- Stephanie Pettee as Alice
- Simon Burzynski as Harry the Postman
- Rami Rank as Neighbor
- Derek Schachter as Neighbor's Kid
- Snowball as Alice (Rabbit Form)

Alice family #1

- Roy Abramsohn as Alice's father/ Detective Jacobs
- Susan Schramm as Alice's mother Susan Schramm imdb
- Bunny Gibson as Alice's grandmother/ Dean Thompson
- Matt Fromm as Jesse

Alice family #2

- Nathan Kirkland as Alice's father
- Selma Pinkard as Alice's mother
- Kalena Knox as Alice's grandmother
- Brian Jacobs as Jesse

Alice family #3

- Leonardo Millan as Alice's father
- Magi Avila as Alice's mother/ Nurse Jacobs
- Margarita Lugo as Alice's grandmother
- Robert Gonzalez as Jesse

"The Radio"

- A. J. Bowen as Jerry
- Elina Madison as Eva
- Akil Wingate as Leon
- Cara Cameron as The Radio
- Elwood Carlisle as Legless the Homeless Man
- Justin Smith as Ronald
- Karen Agnes as Sherry the Hooker
- James Dudelson as TV-operator
- Scott Dudelson as Passed-out Junkie

"Call Girl"

- Camille Lacey as Rachael
- Ryan Carty as Victor
- Moya Nkruma as Street Girl
- Eileen Dietz as Claire the Homeless Woman
- Pablo Pappano as Fat Joe
- Frank Pappano as Father
- Margaret Pappano as Mother

"The Professor's Wife"

- Emmet McGuire as Professor Dayton
- Bo Kresic as Kathy
- Michael Madrid as Charles
- Ben Pronsky as John
- Joseph Russo as Father Russo

"Haunted Dog"

- Kris Allen as Dr. Farewell
- Ed Dyer as Cliffie
- Leigh Rose as Mrs. Lensington
- Dean Dinning as Stephan Rhodes
- Katherine Barber as Dusty Rhodes
- John C. Larkin as Security Guard
- Mike Dalager as Dr. McKinney
- April Wade as Nurse
- Greg McDougall as Hot Dog Man/Creep
- Andre Dupont as Ambulance Attendant-1
- Christopher Estes as Ambulance Attendant-2
- Dean Battaglia as Dino

== Production ==
In October 1992, Laurel Entertainment was reportedly developing Creepshow 3 as an animated film and was meeting with various animation studios for the project.

In July 1994, it was reported that a third Creepshow film was in development as a live-action TV movie. Taurus Entertainment CEO, James Dudelson, was the driving force behind the development of the third Creepshow film which was intended to serve as a backdoor pilot for a Creepshow TV series which at this point in development rather than following the anthological structure of the films instead would focus ongoing plotlines and characters with an initial run of 21 hour-long episodes planned.

Creepshow 3 was backed by the Taurus Entertainment Company and directed by James Glenn Dudelson and Ana Clavell. The film's special make-up effects were created by Greg McDougall, who has also worked on Steven Spielberg's War of the Worlds in the special effects department.

== Release ==
The film was released on April 24, 2006, in Bristol, Rhode Island, in the United States by HBO in 2007, and in the United Kingdom on October 20, 2008, by Anchor Bay UK.

== Reception ==
On review aggregation website Rotten Tomatoes the film has an approval rating of 0% based on 6 reviews, with an average rating of 2.7/10.

Steve Barton at Dread Central called it an "in name only" sequel and that it was "void of any character, depth, integrity, scares, or feeling." James Butane, also of Dread Central, rated it 2/5 and said "This is not a movie worthy to be called Creepshow for any reason, believe me." Rob Hunter of /Film panned the film as "bad" and said "the film never feels like a Creepshow film."
