= Magi Avila =

Mexican-American actress and director (1975-)

- Born: Margarita Avila; December 18, 1975 (age 50); Ensenada, Baja California, Mexico
- Education: Autonomous University of Baja California (BA); University of Guadalajara (MA)
- Occupation: Actress

Magi Avila (born December 18, 1975) is a Mexican-American actress and director. She is well-known for her roles as Adele Fantion in First Kill, as Nurse Jacobs in Creepshow 3, and as Nanny Carmen in Dog Eat Dog. She has also directed a number of independent films.

== Biography ==
Avila was born on December 18, 1975 in Ensenada, in Baja California state, Mexico. She began her career in entertainment at 13, performing in an ensemble led by Maestro Jesus Veliz, Voces de Primavera. She performed for various people while with the ensemble, including for the president of Mexico, Ernesto Zedillo. She earned a bachelors degree in theater and arts at the Autonomous University of Baja California Extension School, as well as a master in theater from the University of Guadalajara. She performed in other theatrical productions, as well as in television and film in Mexico, including the 2003 film Fantasies, starring Mónica Dionne and Alexis Ayala.

By 2007, she moved to the United States with her daughter in search of better opportunities in the entertainment industry. She studied at the Lee Strasberg Theatre and Film Institute campus in Los Angeles, California. She has had in roles in films such as First Kill, Creepshow 3, and Dog Eat Dog. She also performed in the Amazon Prime series My American Family alongside Danny Trejo. Avila also has performed in theater productions of plays such as Nuevo California with the San Diego Repertory Theatre, productions of Real Women Have Curves as part of the CASA 0101 organization, and as Carmen Miranda in Carmen Miranda - The Lady In The Tutti Frutti Hat.

In addition to her work as an actress, she made her debut in directing films with Altitude Not Attitude, a documentary about Michael Warkentin, showing how he navigates life while being quadriplegic. The film was released on June 8, 2021. She is also in the process of filming another documentary, Deep Echo.

Avila resides in Los Angeles. She is currently the CEO of Successful Actor Academy, which sells online courses in acting.

== Filmography ==
=== Film ===
| Year | Title | Role | Notes |
|---|---|---|---|
| 2000 | Dos plebes | Liliana | |
| 2000 | Peor que los perros | Lucinda | |
| 2000 | La muerte de un valiente | Amparo | |
| 2001 | Un perro y un malandrin | Hairstylist | |
| 2001 | La clave de la muerte | Carmen | |
| 2002 | La muerte de un chingon | | |
| 2002 | La clave del diablo | | |
| 2003 | Fantasies | Martha | |
| 2003 | Desierto asesino | Palmira | |
| 2003 | Cuando llegan los mojados | Prima | |
| 2004 | Party Animalz | Lupe | |
| 2006 | Creepshow 3 | Nurse Jacobs / Jacob's mother | |
| 2006 | The Pet | Rita | |
| 2009 | Recién Cazado | Secretaria | |
| 2009 | La reyna del pacifico | Sara Villa | |
| 2011 | A Better Life | Shot girl | |
| 2011 | The Heart of Christmas | | |
| 2011 | Circles of Life | Liz | Short |
| 2012 | Beyond Your Eyes | Dark evil ghost | |
| 2012 | Be Mine | 1 of 3 girls | Short |
| 2016 | Bad Christmas Karma | Alma | Short |
| 2016 | Café Society | Service lady | Uncredited |
| 2016 | Dog Eat Dog | Nanny | |
| 2017 | First Kill | Adele Fanchon | |
| 2017 | WTF: World Thumbwrestling Federation | Gema | |
| 2018 | Magic Hour | Fiona | |
| 2018 | American Martyr | Nurse Ms. M | |
| 2022 | Nobody's Animal | Customer #3 | Short |
| 2023 | L.A. Rush | Cashier | Short |
| 2023 | Meet Los Parents | Cholula | Short |
| 2023 | Final Vow | Magdalena | |
| 2023 | What Could It Be If It Matters? | Karla | Short |
| 2023 | An American King | Maria | |
| 2023 | Galaxies | Maria Jimenez | |
| 2023 | Street Living | Azelea | Short |
| 2024 | The Vanished | | |
| 2026 | Big Foot Burgers | Spanish Speaking Beauty | Short |
| 2026 | The Pet - Oligarchy 2026 | | |

=== Television ===
| Year | Title | Role | Notes |
|---|---|---|---|
| 2008 | Secretos | María Sanchez | Episode: "New Home" |
| 2008 | The Shield | Santi's Girlfriend | Episode: "Family Meeting" |
| 2017 | Training Day | Dance Instructor | Episode: "Tunnel Vision" |
| 2019–2020 | Dhar Mann | Wife/Mother | 13 Episodes |
| 2021 | My American Family | Victoria Martinez | |
| 2022 | Vagary: A Viking Tale | Yura | |

=== As director ===
| Year | Title | Notes |
|---|---|---|
| 2020 | Altitude Not Attitude | Also producer |
| 2023 | Street Living | Also producer |
