= Chelcie Lynn =

American YouTube personality (born 1987)

- Born: August 9, 1987 (age 39); Thackerville, Oklahoma, U.S.
- Occupations: Internet personality; comedian; actress
- Years active: 2013–present
- Spouse: Gregory Melton

YouTube information
- Channel: Chelcie Lynn
- Subscribers: 1.55 million

Comedy career
- Medium: Stand-up; Social media
- Genres: Sexual; improvisational
- Subjects: Sex; white trash; rednecks; family; food; everyday life
- Last updated: 2026

Chelcie Lynn Melton (born August 9, 1987) is an American internet personality, actress and stand-up comedian who began her internet career on the video sharing platform Vine as her character, Trailer Trash Tammy. She posted her first original Vine in 2013 and moved to YouTube to continue sharing content after the platform was discontinued in 2017.

== Career ==
She began her career on the video-sharing platform Vine, and began posting in 2013. Lynn created her YouTube channel on March 30, 2015.

Lynn created her signature character "Trailer Trash Tammy" in 2013. The character is meant to depict a redneck, trailer trash woman living in the Southern United States.

In 2017, she began doing mukbang videos from a car as her character, Trailer Trash Tammy. Mukbanging is a popular style of vlogging in which the vlogger eats on camera, and interacts with the audience. She has collaborated with controversial mukbang YouTuber Nikocado Avocado.

As Vine's shutdown was announced in October 2016, Lynn began posting to YouTube more frequently as it served as an alternative for Vine. Vine was officially discontinued on January 17, 2017.

In 2019, Lynn and Luke Bryan collaborated to prank Bryan's mother, Caroline, into thinking that he was being attacked by an obsessed fan (Tammy) for Bryan's "12 Days of Prankmas".

In June 2021, she was listed on Variety Magazine's Top 10 Comics to Watch for 2021.

In 2019, she began traveling performing stand-up comedy in various comedy clubs and venues.

Lynn has popularized other acts in her YouTube videos and comedy routine, including actress and comedienne Libbie Higgins, who portrays Tammy's fictional cousin "Crystal", and Justina Armistead, who portrays Tammy's fictional cousin "Gem."

In 2022, Lynn and Kid Rock were shown on video kissing at WWE SummerSlam.

== Filmography ==
=== Movies ===
Year	Title	Role	Ref
2015	Tangerine	Madam Jillian	
2016	Dog Eat Dog	Sheila	

2024 Sweet Dreams

=== Skits ===
Title	Role
Coach Von Pidgeon	Coach Von Pidgeon

== See also ==
- List of YouTubers
