= Line of Duty (film) =

2019 American action film

- Film poster
- Directed by: Steven C. Miller
- Written by: Jeremy Drysdale
- Produced by: Myles Nestel; Craig Chapman; Scott Lastaiti; Ryan R. Johnson
- Starring: Aaron Eckhart; Courtney Eaton; Jessica Lu; Dina Meyer; Ben McKenzie; Giancarlo Esposito
- Cinematography: Brandon Cox
- Edited by: Stan Selfas
- Music by: The Newton Brothers
- Production companies: Solution Entertainment Group; Hassik Films; Ingenious Media; Sentient Pictures; Sprockefeller Pictures
- Distributed by: Saban Films
- Release date: November 15, 2019
- Running time: 98 minutes
- Country: United States
- Language: English
- Box office: $640,363

Line of Duty is a 2019 American action thriller film directed by Steven C. Miller and written by Jeremy Drysdale. It stars Aaron Eckhart, Courtney Eaton, Dina Meyer, Ben McKenzie and Giancarlo Esposito.

== Plot ==
Frank Penny (Aaron Eckhart) is a police officer who loves his job and keeps himself fit like a soldier. Nevertheless, his career has stagnated because he killed a child in a dramatic shootout. This means he has a lot of time to monitor traffic offenses and other "small stuff" at an intersection.

He hears over the radio that colleagues are chasing a man, and because he is nearby, he gives chase – against the orders of his superior. He catches the man, and because he threatens him with a gun despite repeated warnings, he shoots him in self-defense.

Unfortunately, the man was the main suspect and the only lead in a kidnapping case, so there is now no way of getting the hostage's whereabouts out of him. To make matters worse, the hostage is the daughter of his ex-partner Tom Volk (Giancarlo Esposito), who is now Police Vice-Captain. He holds Penny personally responsible for endangering the life of his missing daughter. The headstrong police officer wants to make up for his mistake, however, because there are 64 minutes left before the girl drowns in a hidden water tank.

From now on, Penny has to fend for himself, but he is unexpectedly joined by the ambitious young online reporter Ava Brooks (Courtney Eaton). She senses the chance of a lifetime and follows the cop with her camera, which she uses to broadcast a live stream. Penny reluctantly comes to terms with the young woman who offers him her help.

Ava can always provide new information via her followers. However, time is running out. They join forces to try to find out where the girl is. They find out that the dead kidnapper had a brother who could lead Penny to the missing girl, but he wants only one thing: revenge for his brother.

== Cast ==
- Aaron Eckhart as Frank Penny
- Courtney Eaton as Ava Brooks
- Jessica Lu as Clover Nestel
- Dina Meyer as Ruth Carter
- Jan Jeffcoat as female news anchor
- Kaj Goldberg as male news anchor
- Ben McKenzie as Dean Keller
- Giancarlo Esposito as Tom Volk
- Timothy Omundson as Nicolas Luke Forrester

== Production ==
Principal photography and filming took place in Birmingham, Alabama. the city of Melbourne Australia was placed behind the news anchors set.

== Reception ==
On review aggregator Rotten Tomatoes, the film holds an approval rating of 59% based on 17 reviews, with an average rating of 4.9/10. On Metacritic, the film has a weighted average score of 50 out of 100, based on reviews from 5 critics, indicating "mixed or average" reviews.

Dennis Harvey of Variety called it "High on energy if low on credibility." Frank Scheck of The Hollywood Reporter wrote: "Fortunately, the new actioner directed by the prolific Steven C. Miller […] proves fast-paced enough to overcome its more ludicrous plot elements."
