= Arsenal (2017 film) =

- Theatrical release poster
- Directed by: Steven C. Miller
- Screenplay by: Jason Mosberg
- Produced by: Randall Emmett; George Furla
- Starring: Adrian Grenier; John Cusack; Nicolas Cage; Johnathon Schaech
- Cinematography: Brandon Cox
- Edited by: Vincent Tabaillon
- Music by: Ryan Franks; Scott Nickoley
- Production companies: Grindstone Entertainment; Emmett/Furla/Oasis Films
- Distributed by: Lionsgate Premiere
- Release date: January 6, 2017
- Running time: 92 minutes
- Country: United States
- Language: English
- Box office: $41,037

Arsenal (also known as Southern Fury) is a 2017 American direct-to-video action thriller film directed by Steven C. Miller and written by Jason Mosberg. The film stars Adrian Grenier, John Cusack, Nicolas Cage (reprising his role from 1993's Deadfall) and Johnathon Schaech. The film was released on January 6, 2017, by Lionsgate Premiere, receiving negative reviews from critics.

== Plot ==
Mikey and his younger brother JP grow up in their teens on the streets with crime, baseball and brothers looking out for one another. Mikey protects JP when he walks in on his Uncle Rich who's committed suicide with a shotgun. Mikey witnesses Eddie torture and kill somebody who crossed him in the back of the Video Arcade. Later, Mikey gives his lawn mowing job to JP.

Twenty-three years later as adults, Mikey is getting out of jail and JP is running a successful construction company. Sal, a detective friend of JP's warns him about Mikey getting into drugs.

The families celebrate a 4 July picnic with Mikey, his wife Vicki and daughter Alexis being the dysfunctional family and JP and his family being the normal American clan. JP loaned Mikey $10,000 for braces for his daughter but Mikey bought drugs to flip for a quick profit. The drugs have been jacked with Rusty being the prime suspect. Mikey ends up losing the drugs and his money.

Sleezeball mobster Eddie King meets up with Mikey in the club, and decide to stage a kidnapping of Mikey, and Eddie contacts his brother JP demanding $350,000 ransom to free his brother. Mikey is beat up and the pictures are sent to JP.

JP and Sal, who uses his street knowledge, go looking for leads to free Mikey. They track down Rusty who admits to stealing the drugs. JP refuses to pay initially.

Eddie's brother shows up and demands Eddie to stop his silly kidnap scheme. Eddie spent 3 years in jail for his brother Buddy and he does not appreciate the interference. Eddie ruthlessly and brutally kills his brother Buddy.

Mikey says he's not going to play along with Eddie's scheme any more, Eddie decides to kidnap him for real, and gets his henchmen to beat him up in the car park. Mikey wakes up tied to a chair in the back of the Arcade where he witnessed that incident all those years ago.

Eddie lets JP know that he killed his own brother so that his threat to kill Mikey is real. Mikey tries to escape and is beaten up yet again. Eddies henchmen kidnap Mikey's daughter Alexis to ensure that exchange goes ahead. JP agrees to meet up with Eddie and pay $200,000. Mikey goes to the Arcade to rescue his brother, and then, with his brother safe, goes to the meeting with Eddie, but at the money exchange the money bag explodes. Eddie and his henchmen are killed after a bloody long shootout.

Once again the Lindel family enjoys another picnic together.

== Cast ==
- Adrian Grenier as James "JP" Lindel
- Johnathon Schaech as Michael "Mikey" Lindel
- Nicolas Cage as Eddie King
- Lydia Hull as Lizzie - Wife of "JP"
- Christopher Coppola as Buddy King
- John Cusack as Sal
- Megan Leonard as Vicki
- Tyler Jon Olson as Gus
- Christopher Rob Bowen as Rob
- William Mark McCullough as Luca
- Abbie Gayle as Alexis
- Shea Buckner as Rusty
- C.J. LeBlanc as Hoya
- Robert Harvey as Eddie's bodyguard
- Tamara Belous as Janet
- Heather Johansen as Kristy
- Carrie Jo Hubrich as Chelsea
- Vivian Benitez as Lisa

== Release ==
The film was released on January 6, 2017, by Lionsgate Premiere.

=== Critical response ===
On the review aggregator website Rotten Tomatoes, 3% of 30 critics' reviews are positive, with an average rating of 2.2/10. The website's consensus reads: "Aside from an opportunity to watch a mustachioed Nicolas Cage acting from under a wig and behind a prosthetic nose, Arsenal has depressingly little to offer." On Metacritic, the film has a score of 25 out of 100, based on 10 critics, indicating "generally unfavorable" reviews.

Joe Leydon of Variety wrote primarily about Cage's performance, saying it "could be labeled Swift’s Premium and sold by the pound", going on to say that with his "putty nose", "bad wig", and "fake mustache that resembles an exhausted caterpillar", Cage brings his usual "manic gusto", and that "while his over-the-top shtick is perilously nearing the end of its shelf life", Cage "routinely dominates each film in which he appears". Of the entire movie, he called it "pointless flash and filigree". Jesse Hassenger of The A.V. Club also noted the "prime Nic Cage overacting", as well as John Cusack "trying to disguise how miscast he usually is as a lowlife", but wrote that this tried to work as a "quick fix for the movie's weaker elements". Michael Rechtshaffen of the Los Angeles Times was far more negative, saying the movie may already be "the worst movie of 2017", criticizing the "cliché-ridden script", "dripping molasses pace", and "brutally unpleasant" action and fight scenes. He too noted that Cage's "sadistic Sonny Bono get-up" was "anything but dull". Sheri Linden of The Hollywood Reporter wrote: "Miller orchestrates the final crescendo of bloodletting by indulging in a jokey, ultra-slow-motion ballet of shotgun pellets, spurting arteries and exploding skulls. He accomplishes what he set out to do, but it's all been done before."
