= Passion Holiday =

1963 American film

Passion Holiday is a 1963 American film written and directed by Wynn Mavis. It starred Bobbi Shaw in an early role.

== Cast ==
- Christy Foushee as Cathy
- Linda Hall as Anne
- Yanka Mann as
- Stella Palma as Betty
- Bruce Brown as Frank
- Harry Hocker as Harry
- Fred Kost as Eddie
- Bob Lee as George
