= Werewolves (film) =

2024 American film by Steven C. Miller

- Theatrical release poster
- Directed by: Steven C. Miller
- Written by: Matthew Kennedy
- Produced by: Myles Nestel; Craig Chapman; Steven C. Miller; James Michael Cummings
- Starring: Frank Grillo; Katrina Law; Ilfenesh Hadera; James Michael Cummings; Lou Diamond Phillips; James Kyson
- Cinematography: Brandon Cox
- Edited by: Greg MacLennan
- Music by: The Newton Brothers
- Production companies: Burke Management; Monty the Dog Productions; Solution Entertainment Group
- Distributed by: Briarcliff Entertainment
- Release date: December 6, 2024
- Running time: 94 minutes
- Country: United States
- Language: English
- Box office: $2 million

Werewolves is a 2024 American action horror film directed and produced by Steven C. Miller. It stars Frank Grillo, Katrina Law, Ilfenesh Hadera, James Michael Cummings, and Lou Diamond Phillips. The story takes place on the night of a supermoon event that causes humans to turn into werewolves, which first occurred the preceding year, and follows the attempts to control the situation. The film was released theatrically in the United States on December 6, 2024, to mixed reviews.

== Plot ==
One year ago, during the supermoon, humans exposed to the moonlight transformed into monstrous werewolves that hunted other humans. In response, humanity is preparing for another supermoon event, barricading their homes with weapons and self-defense traps, and military personnel caging humans who were exposed to the moon a year ago while scientists try to reverse the mutation caused by the moon.

Wesley Marshall, a former U.S. Marine turned molecular biologist, lives with his sister-in-law, Lucy, and her daughter, Emma. He works on fortifying the house against the werewolves. Reagan, a neighbor, comes to visit them before leaving for the supermoon night. As the family stocks up, Lucy convinces Wesley to head back to the laboratory, where they are working on a solution to cure the werewolf mutation since he is working for them, but Wesley is hesitant because it would leave them unprotected despite the precautions.

Dr. James Aranda and his team of scientists, including Wesley, have developed a special serum called "Moonscreen". It is designed to block moonlight from affecting the human genome when exposed. Dr. Amy Chen is one of the scientists working on the serum. Military personnel and scientists construct a highly secured facility to keep their test subjects in cages while injected with the serum. The scientists wear moonlight preventive suits and inject the serum into the test subjects before opening the roof to expose the subjects to the moonlight. At first, Miles and the other test subjects remain human, but eventually, they transform into werewolves. A panicked guard attempts to shoot at them, but they are accidentally freed and rampage across the facility. In the chaos, Aranda is exposed to the moonlight and transforms into a werewolf.

Wesley and Amy flee into a storage room where they inject themselves with the serum, but since the inoculation effect lasts for only one hour, they bring vials with them so they can remain human. They then gear up with protective clothing and weapons and leave the facility in a van. Wesley suggests heading to his home, which has more protection. However, their vehicle is caught in a crash with a bus, so they are forced to proceed on foot. They carefully navigate through the ruined streets overrun with werewolves. The serum's effect wears off and they flee from the werewolves into the tunnels. They head to a convenience store to cool down the serum before giving themselves another dose. They are caught in a crossfire between heavily armed survivors and werewolves. Surrounded by the werewolves, Amy attempts to distract them with a display of dominance. Wesley and Amy try to flee in a car, but Amy is dragged away by a werewolf, forcing Wesley to head home.

Meanwhile, Lucy and Emma have bunkered down in their fortified home. A crazed veteran neighbor, Cody Walker, shoots at one of the werewolves outside, but his house is struck with debris, causing him to be exposed to the moon and transform into a werewolf. He attacks Reagan at her home, and she flees to the Marshalls, pleading with them to let her in, but he catches up and kills her. The noise attracts other nearby werewolves who attack the house, forcing Lucy to defend herself and Emma. Wesley arrives and kills the other werewolves before his serum wears off. As dawn approaches, Wesley exposes himself to the moon, transforms into a werewolf, and kills Cody. However, before he can attack Lucy and Emma, the sun rises, and Wesley transforms back into a human. He reunites with his family, knowing that the serum was a success.

== Cast ==
- Frank Grillo as Wesley Marshall
- Katrina Law as Dr. Amy Chen
- Ilfenesh Hadera as Lucy Marshall
- James Michael Cummings as Cody Walker
- Lou Diamond Phillips as Dr. Aranda
- James Kyson as Miles Chen
- Kamdynn Gary as Emma Marshall
- Lydia Styslinger as Reagan
- Ian Whyte as Lead Wolf
- Dane DiLiegro as Wolf
- Ian Feuer as Wolf

== Production ==
In June 2022, it was announced that a horror thriller film directed and co-produced by Steven C. Miller, originally titled Year 2, had begun principal photography in Puerto Rico, with Matthew Kennedy writing the screenplay. Frank Grillo, Katrina Law, Ilfenesh Hadera, James Michael Cummings, and Lou Diamond Phillips made up the main cast. In February 2024, the film had been retitled Werewolves and C. Miller announced the post-production was close to completion.

== Release ==
Werewolves was released in the United States by Briarcliff Entertainment on December 6, 2024.

== Reception ==
=== Box office ===
In Russia/CIS the film released on December 5, 2024, and earned $76,323, and in the United States the film released alongside Y2K and Pushpa 2: The Rule on December 6 and earned over $1,052,998 in 1,351 theaters on its Opening with a total gross of $1,867,399.

=== Critical response ===
On the review aggregator website Rotten Tomatoes, 49% of 48 critics' reviews are positive, with an average rating of 5.2/10. The website's consensus reads: "An unapologetically schlocky horror flick, Werewolves more or less scratches the genre itch without ever becoming the howling good time it could've been." Metacritic, which uses a weighted average, assigned the film a score of 46 out of 100, based on five critics, indicating "mixed or average" reviews.

Collider praised the concept but ultimately felt that it "all leads to a final fight that should feel epic but ends up being more disappointment." Owen Gleiberman, writing for Variety, said "It’s not a good movie, but it’s a tight little time passer."
