= Vice (2015 film) =

2015 film by Brian A. Miller

- Theatrical release poster
- Directed by: Brian A. Miller
- Written by: Andre Fabrizio; Jeremy Passmore
- Produced by: Steven Saxton; Randall Emmett; George Furla; Adam Goldworm
- Starring: Thomas Jane; Bruce Willis; Ambyr Childers; Johnathon Schaech; Bryan Greenberg; Charlotte Kirk; Tyler Olson
- Cinematography: Yaron Levy
- Edited by: Rick Shaine
- Music by: Hybrid
- Production companies: Grindstone Entertainment Group; Emmett/Furla/Oasis Films; Aperture Entertainment; K5 International
- Distributed by: Lionsgate
- Release date: January 16, 2015 (United States)
- Running time: 96 minutes
- Country: United States
- Language: English
- Box office: $1.5 million

Vice is a 2015 American science fiction action film directed by Brian A. Miller and written by Andre Fabrizio and Jeremy Passmore. The film stars Thomas Jane, Bruce Willis, and Ambyr Childers.

The plot follows Julian Michaels (Willis), who has opened a resort with questionable ethics, where people can act out their fiercest fantasies with the resort's androids. When one of the androids, Kelly (Childers), becomes sentient and escapes, she joins forces with police detective Roy Tedeschi (Jane) to bring Michaels down and destroy his resort.

The film received negative reviews from critics.

== Plot ==
A futuristic resort, Vice, offers visitors the opportunity to live out all their fantasies, no matter how violent or deviant, on sophisticated androids (referred to as "artificials"). Every day, the androids' memories are reset, and any damage sustained is scheduled for repair. To maintain the illusion that the androids are real, they are programmed to have behavioral responses such as emotions and believe themselves to be human. Kelly, a gynoid bartender, believes herself to be on the last day of her job. After meeting Evan, a friendly visitor who encourages her to follow her dreams, she and her friend Melissa, also a gynoid, are brutally killed by a different visitor. At the same time, Detective Roy Tedeschi arrests a rapist at the resort as he sexually assaults one of the androids. Tedeschi's captain orders him to stay away from Vice and only arrest its patrons after they leave, as Vice provides massive tax revenue for the city. Tedeschi believes that visitors to Vice become desensitized to violence and rape, pointing to the man he arrested as proof, and suspects that his department is taking bribes from the resort. As Tedeschi storms out, he vows to stop Vice.

Vice CEO Julian Michaels orders Kelly immediately reactivated, as important clients are scheduled to arrive soon. Soon after, she experiences random flashbacks, and she is recalled. An engineer explains that her memories cannot truly be deleted, only made inaccessible. To stop her from having flashbacks, he must first bring all her memories to the forefront. Alarmed by the trauma of reliving all her deaths and sexual assaults, Kelly breaks free of her restraints before her memories can be reset. Security forces chase her through the resort, but she escapes into the outside city. There, she learns the truth about Vice and herself. Michaels orders a security team, led by Chris, to quietly reacquire her through any means necessary. Michaels plans to expand the use of androids to military and commercial use once they have become more socially acceptable. Believing a loose android could jeopardize this, he covers up the escape and blames the resort's brief shutdown on a terrorist attack.

Tedeschi becomes suspicious and angers his captain when he confronts Michaels. Ordered again to stay away from Vice, Tedeschi is assigned to a series of homicides apparently performed by a professional mercenary. Unknown to Tedeschi or his captain, this is Chris' work as he attempts to recapture Kelly and kills anyone who gets in his way. After evading Chris, Kelly visits an abandoned church she has seen in her dreams. There, she meets Evan again, who reveals himself as her creator. Evan created her in the image of his dead wife so he could spend more time with her. Michaels bought out his company. When Evan learned of Michaels' plans, he left but lost control of his research. Evan promises to help Kelly, but before they can leave, Tedeschi arrives, having realized that DNA traces left at a crime scene belong to Evan's dead wife. As Tedeschi attempts to arrest Evan, Kelly knocks him unconscious. Vice's security also track Kelly to the church; Evan and Kelly escape as Tedeschi and the security team open fire on each other.

Evan's friend James, a computer hacker, gives them new identities and passage out of the city. En route, Evan dies while protecting Kelly from more of Vice's thugs. Kelly takes up Tedeschi's offer to stay and shut down Vice. They visit James for help and receive a virus which is programmed to restore androids' erased memories, resulting in chaos and the closure of Vice. Kelly is upgraded to possess advanced combat skills. After a makeover, Tedeschi and Kelly infiltrate Vice posing as a married couple. Kelly tracks down Michaels, but fail-safe programming prevents her from harming him. However, after Kelly is captured, Tedeschi forces a tech to load the virus. All of Vice's androids have their memories restored, and they start a rebellion, killing the visitors who previously brutalized them. Kelly then reveals that, despite wanting to kill Michaels, she is actually a decoy to distract Michaels and his guards for Tedeschi, and she is already aware of the fail-safe programming. Ignoring Kelly's taunting, Michaels begins a gunfight with Tedeschi which kills Chris. Kelly then frees herself and hands Chris' pistol to Tedeschi, who then uses it to kill Michaels. As Kelly and Melissa embrace outside the resort as the chaos continues, Michaels' eyes suddenly open.

== Cast ==
- Thomas Jane as Roy
- Bruce Willis as Julian Michaels
- Ambyr Childers as Kelly
- Johnathon Schaech as Chris
- Bryan Greenberg as Evan
- Ryan O'Nan as Det. Matthews
- Charlotte Kirk as Melissa
- Brett Granstaff as James
- Colin Egglesfield as Reiner
- Don Harvey as Kazansky
- Jesse Pruett as Officer Pullman

== Production ==
Shooting began on April 3, 2014, in Mobile, Alabama. A former Masonic temple, The Temple Downtown, was used for exterior shots of Evan's abandoned church home. Exterior shots representing the futuristic city are of and around Miami's downtown in South Florida.

== Release ==
Vice was released on DVD and Blu-ray on March 17, 2015. Vice grossed $1,568,954 theatrically and $1,901,117 in home video sales.

== Reception ==
On the review aggregator website Rotten Tomatoes, 4% of 26 critics' reviews are positive, with an average rating of 2.7/10. The website's consensus reads: "Bruce Willis and Thomas Jane are visibly bored by the dreary material in this sci-fi hodgepodge, proving that star power in service of a lousy script is no virtue." Metacritic, which uses a weighted average, assigned the film a score of 17 out of 100, based on 14 critics, indicating "overwhelming dislike".

Justin Chang of Variety called it a "relentlessly mediocre" film that "barely engages with its potential ideas beyond the most blandly expository, bullet-ridden level". Chang said Willis' against-type casting could have been fun, but Willis instead seems bored.

Jeannette Catsoulis of The New York Times wrote that the film "has absolutely nothing to recommend it", and Robert Abele of the Los Angeles Times called it "dystopian sci-fi for dummies".

In giving it a C rating, Ignatiy Vishnevetsky of The A.V. Club described it as "crummy and artless in a way that's intrinsically watchable". Vishnevetsky wrote that although Jane's acting is not believable, it is fun to watch the bizarre mannerisms, comparing it to Gary Busey's off-kilter performances.

== See also ==
- Bruce Willis filmography
