= Vincent Tabaillon =

French film editor (born 1975)

- Born: January 18, 1975 (age 51); Sete, Hérault, France
- Occupation: Film editor
- Years active: 1999–present

Vincent Tabaillon (born January 18, 1975) is a French film editor. His credits include The Incredible Hulk, Clash of the Titans, Now You See Me and Baahubali: The Beginning.

== Life and career ==
Tabaillon was born in Sete, Hérault, France, and started his career editing films for Luc Besson's EuropaCorp. He was associated with French director Louis Leterrier's films which include The Incredible Hulk, Transporter 2 and Now You See Me. His prominent works also include Taken 2 for Fox Broadcasting Company, The Prodigies for Warner Bros., The Legend of Hercules for Summit Entertainment and The Prodigies.

In 2003, he was given the Lutin Award for Best Editing for the 2002 French short film called Squash.

Tabaillon is also known for editing an international cut of India's most expensive film Baahubali: The Beginning. Though the film was initially edited by Kotagiri Venkateswara Rao for its domestic audience, Tabaillon was hired by Arka Media Works to re-edit the film for international markets. This international cut, 20 minutes shorter than the original version, was screened at Busan International Film Festival and was scheduled to be released in China, Japan and many European and Latin American countries.

== Filmography ==
Year	Film name	Notes
1999	Suspendu	Short film
2002	Shooting Stars	
2002	Squash	Short film
2002	Ma Forever	Short film
2003	Don't Worry Be Happy	
2004	People	
2004	La vache qui pleure	Short film
2005	Majorité	Short film
2005	Pas bouger!	Short film
2005	Transporter 2	
2006	Final Sentence	
2006	Camping	
2006	Dikkenek	
2006	Novice	Short film
2006	Arthur and the Invisibles	
2008	The Incredible Hulk	
2010	The Clash of the Titans	
2011	The Prodigies	
2012	Taken 2	
2013	Now You See Me	
2014	The Legend of Hercules	
2015	Baahubali: The Beginning	International cut only
2016	Marauders	
2016	Ares	
2017	Arsenal	
2017	Revolt	
2018	Escape Plan 2: Hades	
2018	Burning Shadow	
2018	Belleville Cop	
2019	Rim of the World	
2020	Go Karts	
2020	Monster Zone	
2021	The Forever Purge	
2022	The Takedown	
