= Aperture Entertainment =

Management/production company

Aperture Entertainment is a management and production company founded by Adam Goldworm in March 2009.

== Description ==
Aperture Entertainment represents writers, directors, and actors, including Cory Goodman, Jeremy Passmore, Scott Mann, Steven C. Miller and Jeremy Lott. The company also represents actors such as actress/singer Jessica Lowndes and actress Alex Essoe.

Aperture Entertainment has also produced several films. These include Vice, written by Jeremy Passmore and Andre Fabrizio, as well as The Prince, also written by Passmore and Fabrizio and starring Bruce Willis, John Cusack and 50 Cent. The company also produced Warner Bros.' horror-action film Lore starring Dwayne "The Rock" Johnson. Other projects include Summit Entertainment's horror-action film The Last Witch Hunter, starring Vin Diesel and (The Crazies) based on a script written by Cory Goodman, and MGM's planned remake of David Cronenberg's body horror classic The Brood.

Aperture Entertainment is also active in television production, with projects including Haunted at ABC, (National Treasure), and the comedy series Saint James St. James Presents Delirium Cinema at IFC.

== Partial film filmography ==
- The Prince (2014)
- Vice (2015)
- The Last Witch Hunter (2015)
- Snuff (2008)
- Lore (2012)
- Man At Arms (2015)
- Apocalypse: Undead (2012)
- The Brood (2015)
- Taste (2015)
- My Friend Dahmer (2017)
- Satanic Panic (2019)

== Partial TV filmography ==
- Jackass of All Trades (2014)
- The Factory Series (2015)
- Nemesis: The Final Case of Eliot Ness (2015)
