= Jedidiah Goodacre =

Canadian actor

- Born: January 11, 1989 (age 37); Petrolia, Ontario, Canada
- Occupation: Actor
- Years active: 2013–present
- Notable work: Descendants; Finding You

Jedidiah Goodacre (born January 11, 1989) is a Canadian actor. He starred opposite Rose Reid in the 2021 feature film Finding You. He also starred in the 2022 film Margaux. On television, he portrayed Dorian Gray in Chilling Adventures of Sabrina. He also acted opposite Wesley Snipes in The Recall (2017).

== Filmography ==
=== Film ===
Year	Title	Role	Notes
2014	Way of the Wicked	Matt	
2015	Tomorrowland	Jetpack Buddy	
2016	Mostly Ghostly: One Night in Doom House	Colin Doyle	
2016	Monster Trucks	Jake	
2017	The Recall	Charlie	
2017	Gregoire	Louis	
2021	Finding You	Beckett Rush	
2022	Margaux	Drew	
2023	Woman of the Hour	Arnie	
2025	F*** Marry Kill	Kyle	

=== Television ===
Year	Title	Role	Notes
2013	Restless Virgins	Cotton	Television film
2014	Zapped	Tripp	Television film
2015	The 100	Craig	4 episodes
2015	The Dollanganger Saga	Jory	Miniseries
2015	Descendants	Chad Charming	Television film
2016	Some Assembly Required	Felix	2 episodes
2016	Supernatural	Henry	Episode: "Don't You Forget About Me"
2016	A Mother's Suspicion	Gary Smith	Television film
2016	Motive	Tyler	Episode: "Foreign Relations"
2017	Descendants 2	Chad Charming	Television film
2017	Somewhere Between	Jason Tanner	2 episodes
2018	The Originals	Roman Sienna	Recurring role (season 5)
2018–2020	Chilling Adventures of Sabrina	Dorian Gray	Recurring role
2019	Legacies	Roman Sienna	2 episodes
2019	Descendants 3	Chad Charming	Television film
2019–2020	The Order	Kyle	Recurring role (season 1); guest role (season 2)
2021	Matchmaker Mysteries	Derrick Holland	1 episode
2021	Descendants: The Royal Wedding	Chad Charming (voice)	Television special
2022	The Imperfects	P.J.	5 episodes
2023	Marry F*** Kill	Grant Feigen	Television film
2024	Tracker	Rufus	Episode: "The Mercy Seat"
2025	The Thundermans: Undercover	Peter Perfect / Captain Perfect	Recurring role
2026	My Life with the Walter Boys	Danvers Stacey	Recurring role
