= Lionsgate Premiere =

Part of Lionsgate films that specializes in direct to video

- Type: Division
- Industry: Motion picture
- Founded: 2015; 11 years ago
- Headquarters: Santa Monica, California, U.S.
- Key people: Jean McDowell; Tim Pallen; Adam Sorensen
- Products: Film distribution
- Parent: Lionsgate Films
- Website: lionsgate.com

Lionsgate Premiere is the speciality film division of entertainment company Lionsgate Films that focuses on direct-to-video and direct-to-video on demand, while some films also receives low-budget theatrical releases.

== Background ==
On April 1, 2015, Lionsgate confirmed they had launched speciality division to release films theatrically, through video on demand, and streaming services and streaming platforms. Marketing for the new label would be headed by Lionsgate senior VP of marketing and research, Jean McDowell. Lionsgate marketing officer, Tim Palen, would help with the promotional efforts.

Adam Sorensen, manager of sales, would take charge of Lionsgate Premiere's distribution. That same month, it was announced several of Grindstone Entertainment Group's films would be released under the label. The division also released select films by CBS Films as part of the distribution partnership with parent company Lionsgate, with the only release being Get a Job. Premiere and Hulu teamed to release Joshy.

== Select releases ==
Release date	Title	Notes	Reference
August 21, 2015	She's Funny That Way		
September 4, 2015	Dragon Blade		
September 18, 2015	Cooties	U.S distribution only; co-production with SpectreVision and Glacier Films	
October 9, 2015	Knock Knock		
November 13, 2015	Heist		
December 11, 2015	Don Verdean		
December 18, 2015	Extraction		
January 22, 2016	Exposed		
February 5, 2016	Misconduct		
March 25, 2016	Get a Job		
April 22, 2016	Precious Cargo		
May 13, 2016	Under the Gun	co distribution with Epix	
May 20, 2016	Manhattan Night		
June 3, 2016	Urge		
June 24, 2016	The Duel		
July 1, 2016	Marauders		
August 12, 2016	Joshy	co distribution with Hulu	
August 12, 2016	Blood Father		
August 19, 2016	Imperium		
September 16, 2016	Operation Avalanche		
October 7, 2016	The Great Gilly Hopkins		
October 21, 2016	The Whole Truth		
November 18, 2016	Life on the Line		
December 2, 2016	Man Down		
December 16, 2016	Solace		
January 6, 2017	Arsenal		
April 7, 2017	Aftermath		
May 26, 2017	Black Butterfly		
June 30, 2017	Inconceivable		
July 21, 2017	First Kill		
September 1, 2017	Unlocked		
September 8, 2017	Rememory		
November 17, 2017	Cook Off!		
January 12, 2018	Acts of Violence		
March 9, 2018	Bent		
April 6, 2018	Spinning Man		
May 25, 2018	Future World		
July 6, 2018	Bleeding Steel		
August 31, 2018	Reprisal		
December 14, 2018	Backtrace		
May 27, 2022	Zero Contact		
August 12, 2022	Fall		
September 2, 2022	Wire Room		
January 24, 2023	Rock Dog 3: Battle the Beat		
April 28, 2023	Sisu		
October 6, 2023	Desperation Road		
January 26, 2024	Miller's Girl		
December 13, 2024	Dirty Angels		
March 7, 2025	F*** Marry Kill		
August 15, 2025	Americana		
November 7, 2025	I Wish You All the Best		
March 13, 2026	The Gates		
March 20, 2026	Do Not Enter		
April 10, 2026	Beast		
June 12, 2026	The Furious		
July 20, 2026	Splash City		
September 2, 2026	Fall 2: Deadpoint		
October 2, 2026	Beware Boiúna		
