= Linda Rich =

American actress and hazzan

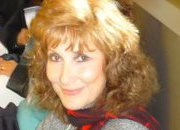
Cantor Linda Rich

Linda Rich is an American actress and hazzan.

== Education ==
She majored in Theatre Arts and Music at San Francisco State University, and received scholarships to study acting at the American Conservatory Theater (ACT), musical theatre at the Dorothy Chandler Pavilion, and is also an accomplished classical pianist. Linda is married to Philip Freed of London, England.

== Career ==
Rich became the first female cantor to daven (chant) in a Conservative synagogue (specifically Temple Beth Zion in Los Angeles), although she was not ordained until 1996 when she finally received her ordination of "Hazzan Minister" from the "Jewish Theological Seminary" in New York. That same year she became a member of the "Cantors Assembly of America". The 1984 Olympics were held in Los Angeles, and Rich was chosen as their official cantor; she also sang at the "1984 World Chassidic Festival" in Haifa, Jerusalem, and Tel Aviv. An album entitled "World Chassidic Festival" was later released, containing among other songs her recording of "Barcheynu Avinu." In January 2008, she received a Commendation from the "City of Los Angeles" for her "extraordinary talent and accomplishments".
