= Adrian Grenier =

American actor (born 1976)

- Grenier in 2014
- Born: Adrian Sean Grenier; July 10, 1976 (age 50); Santa Fe, New Mexico, U.S.
- Education: Fiorello H. LaGuardia High School; Bard College
- Occupations: Actor; producer; director; musician; social entrepreneur and social worker
- Years active: 1997–present
- Spouse: Jordan Roemmele (m. 2022)
- Children: 2

Adrian Sean Grenier (born July 10, 1976) is an American actor. He is best known for his portrayal of Vincent Chase in the television series Entourage (2004–2011). He has appeared in films such as Drive Me Crazy (1999), The Devil Wears Prada (2006), Trash Fire (2016), and Marauders (2016), as well as the Netflix series Clickbait (2021).

== Early life ==
Grenier was born in Santa Fe, New Mexico, the son of Karesse Grenier and John Dunbar. His parents were never married. He was raised by his mother in New York City. His mother was born in New Mexico to a family of mostly Mexican, Spanish, and some French descent.

A DNA test on a 2012 episode of the series Finding Your Roots showed Grenier to have approximately 8% Native American ancestry and that his direct matrilineal line is Native American. The program determined that his ancestor Diego de Montoya (born in Texcoco, State of Mexico, Mexico, formerly, New Spain, in 1596) was the leader of an encomienda, a protectorate of Puebloan peoples in Pueblo San Pedro in New Mexico. He shares this ancestor with author and commentator Linda Chavez, making them ninth cousins. As of 2016, Grenier self-identifies as "part Apache Indian".

Grenier graduated from Fiorello H. LaGuardia High School of Music & Art and Performing Arts and attended Bard College in New York.

== Career ==
=== Acting ===
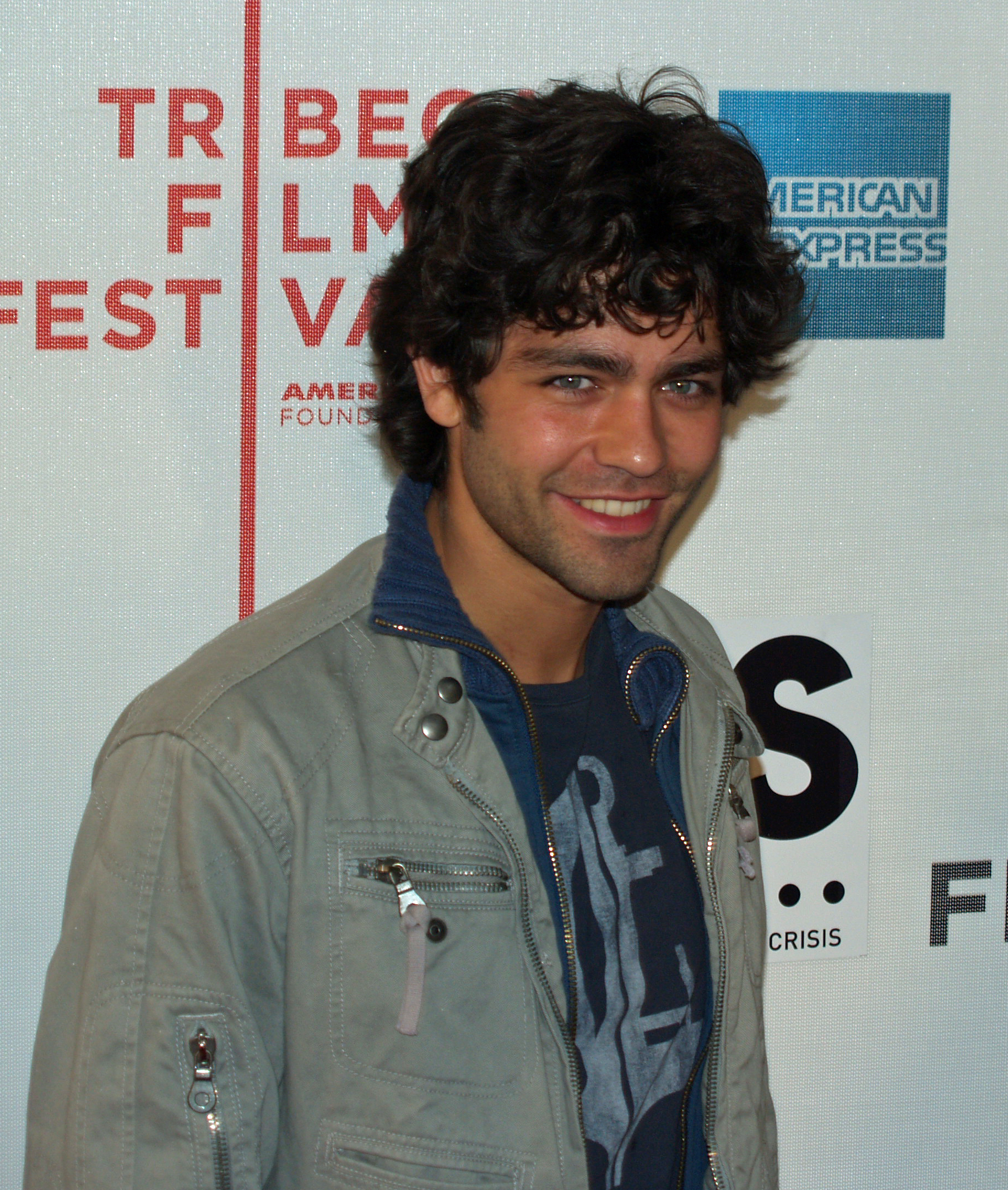
Grenier at the 2007 Tribeca Film Festival

In 1997, Grenier left Bard to embark on a film career. He made his film debut in the independent drama Arresting Gena, then in 1999 played opposite Melissa Joan Hart in Drive Me Crazy and in 2001 starred in James Toback's Harvard Man.

In 2004, Grenier played Vincent Chase in the HBO series Entourage, gaining his most substantial notability and success. The series followed the triumphs and trials in the life of Chase, as the movie star character and his friends lived the good life in Los Angeles. It ran for eight seasons, from 2004 to 2011, and was nominated for numerous Emmy Awards, including Outstanding Comedy Series.

In 2006, he starred alongside Meryl Streep, Anne Hathaway, Emily Blunt, Stanley Tucci and Simon Baker in the comedy-drama The Devil Wears Prada as Nate Cooper, a cook and the boyfriend of Hathaway's character, Andrea "Andy" Sachs.

In 2013, he starred in the post-apocalyptic film Goodbye World alongside Gaby Hoffmann. It premiered at the 2013 Los Angeles Film Festival where it received good reviews. The film made its cinematic release in the United States on April 4, 2014.

Grenier stepped back in front of the camera in 2015 to reprise his role of Vincent Chase in the Entourage film adaptation. Filming began in January 2014, and the film was released in June 2015. In 2016, Grenier shot the heist movie Marauders. The film would make it to Netflix's American platform's top two in December 2020. Grenier also starred in the 2021 8-episode American-Australian drama/thriller miniseries, Clickbait, on Netflix, where he played Nick Brewer.

He is a campus advisor for Academy for Global Citizenship in Chicago, Illinois.

=== Directing and producing ===
As a vehicle for Grenier to transition between acting, directing, and producing, with some partners, he started Reckless Productions in 2001. The company focused on producing socially-minded films. One of its first, Shot in the Dark, chronicled Grenier's journey to reconnect with his estranged father, Dunbar, with whom his mother broke up when he was still a baby. Grenier and Dunbar remained estranged for 18 years until he began work on the documentary in an attempt to forge a relationship with him. The two eventually reunited and continue to remain in contact. This was Grenier's directorial debut, and the film premiered at the 2002 Tribeca Film Festival. HBO distributed the documentary and it premiered on the channel on June 3, 2007.

On June 2, 2008, Grenier premiered a new television series, Alter Eco, for which he was the producer. The show aired on the Discovery communications channel Planet Green and featured Grenier and a team of green experts showing changes that can be made to live a more eco-friendly and sustainable lifestyle.

On September 27, 2010, HBO premiered Teenage Paparazzo, a documentary directed by Grenier and produced by Bert Marcus. It premiered at the Sundance Film Festival. The film focused on 13-year-old paparazzo Austin Visschedyk and the celebrity-obsessed world in which he operates. It also featured interviews with celebrities such as Lindsay Lohan, Alec Baldwin, and Whoopi Goldberg. Aside from HBO, Teenage Paparazzo premiered on 40 other outlets around the globe. In addition to its theatrical release, Grenier took the documentary to college campuses nationwide in the Teenage Paparazzo Experience Tour. The tour included a call for art to be included in a traveling gallery that challenged the traditional understanding of celebrity and modern media.

In 2010, Grenier began working as a producer alongside producer Bert Marcus and director Matthew Cooke on the full-length feature documentary How to Make Money Selling Drugs. The film was a tongue-in-cheek look at what is considered to be one of the worst domestic policy failures in recent American history. It featured actual dealers and celebrities commenting on the subject, including; 50 Cent, Eminem, Susan Sarandon and David Simon, head writer of the HBO series The Wire. It was released in the Summer of 2013 on Amazon.com and iTunes, and it received positive reviews.

=== Music ===
Grenier plays guitar, bass, drums, and harmonica. He was a member of two New York bands: the lead singer in Kid Friendly and the drummer in The Honey Brothers before moving on to build Wreckroom, a music incubator, and recording studio in May 2012.

Wreckroom releases EPs and a video series of cover songs, titled "Under the Covers". Two bands, Missouri "punk 'n' roll" trio Radkey and metal-spined Brooklyn five-piece The Skins, released EPs on the label in 2013. Wreckroom also hosts curated music showcases in both Brooklyn and Austin.

Most recently, Adrian co-wrote the song 'the master and margarita' with artist 'SORAYA'. The song was inspired by the Russian surrealist classic novel of the same name but SORAYA and Adrian imagined it taking place in contemporary Austin, Texas. It was distributed by Empire and released in early 2024.

== Philanthropic efforts ==
=== SHFT.com ===
An advocate of sustainable living, Grenier and his business partner and film producer Peter Glatzer founded the lifestyle brand SHFT.com in 2010. SHFT is a brand that promotes sustainability through film, design, art, and culture and lives both online and offline.

SHFT has partnered with brands such as Ford Motor Company, AOL/Huffington Post, Virgin America, Stonyfield Farm, The W Hollywood, The Weather Channel, and Estée Lauder. In its second year, SHFT won two Webby Awards for best website in its category.

In 2014, Grenier and Glatzer partnered with Stone Barns Center for Food and Agriculture to create SHFT Mobile Kitchen Classroom – a teaching kitchen on wheels for high-school students in New York City.

=== United Nations Environment Goodwill Ambassador ===
On World Environment Day 2017, Grenier was appointed as a goodwill ambassador for the United Nations Environment Programme. Grenier was chosen due to his work with the Lonely Whale Foundation. In his role, Grenier advocates for reducing single-use plastic and for the protection of marine species.

=== Bitcoin ===
Grenier is a Bitcoin advocate and is developing a farming community in Texas that would use cryptocurrency for exchange.

== Personal life ==
Grenier married Jordan Roemmele in a ceremony in Morocco in 2022. They had a son in June 2023. On November 5, 2024, they announced that they are expecting their second child.

== Political views ==
During the 2016 United States presidential election, Grenier endorsed Democratic nominee Hillary Clinton, writing that the country needed "a president that will lead us to a brighter environmental future". He criticized statements by Donald Trump about climate change, calling them "extremely destructive".

== Filmography ==
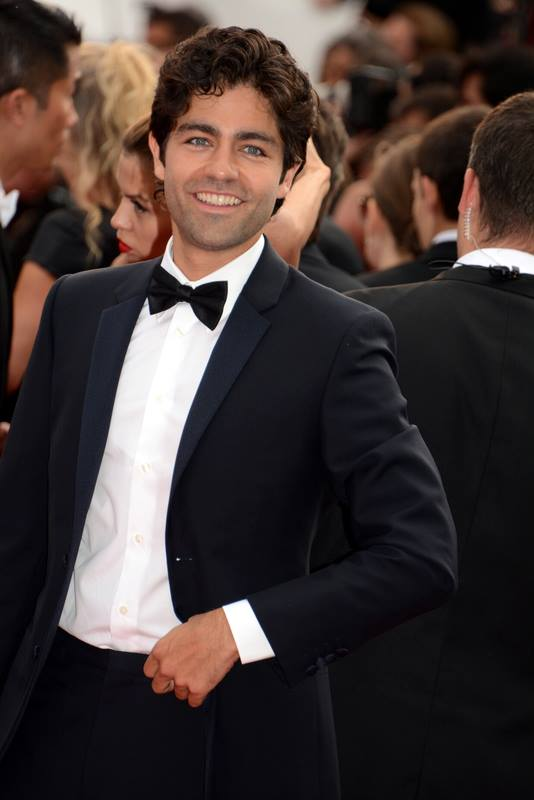
Grenier at the 2014 Cannes Film Festival

=== Film ===
Year	Title	Role	Notes
1997	Arresting Gena	Kabush	
1997	Hurricane Streets	Punk	
1998	Fishes Outta Water		
1998	Celebrity	Darrow's Entourage	
1998	The Adventures of Sebastian Cole	Sebastian Cole	
1999	Drive Me Crazy	Chase Hammond	
2000	Cecil B. Demented	Lyle	
2001	Harvard Man	Alan Jensen	
2001	Artificial Intelligence: AI	Teen in van	
2002	Freshening Up	Noah	Short film
2002	Love in the Time of Money	Nick	
2002	Hart's War	Pvt. Daniel E. Abrams	
2003	Bringing Rain	Clay Askins	
2003	Anything Else	Ray Polito	
2004	Tony N' Tina's Wedding	Michael	
2005	A Perfect Fit	John	
2006	Across the Hall	Julian	Short film
2006	The Devil Wears Prada	Nate Cooper	
2007	Off Hour	Bruno	Short Film Award Best Actor
2008	Adventures of Power	Dallas Houston	
2014	Goodbye World	James	
2015	Unity	Narrator	Documentary
2015	Entourage	Vincent Chase	
2015	Sex, Death and Bowling	Sean McAllister	
2016	Trash Fire	Owen	Direct-to-video
2016	Marauders	Wells	Direct-to-video
2017	Arsenal	JP	Direct-to-video
2018	Affairs of State	Rob Reynolds	
2019	Christmas at Graceland: Home for the Holidays	Owen Read	Hallmark Movie
2020	Stage Mother	Nathan	
2021	Far More	Sean McAllister	
2025	You, Always	Ethan	

=== Television ===
Year	Title	Role	Notes
2004–2011	Entourage	Vincent Chase	Lead role; 96 episodes Nominated – ASTRA Award for Favourite International Personality or Actor (2009); Nominated – Golden Nymph Award for Outstanding Actor, Comedy Series (2008, 2010); Nominated – PRISM Award for Performance in a Comedy Series (2011–2012); Nominated – Screen Actors Guild Award for Outstanding Performance by an Ensemble in a Comedy Series (2007–2009); Nominated – Teen Choice Award for Choice Summer TV Star: Male (2009); Nominated – Teen Choice Award for Choice TV Actor Comedy (2007); Nominated – Teen Choice Award for Choice TV Chemistry (shared w/ cast) (2006)
2008	Alter Eco	Himself	Docu-serie; 9 episodes
2010	90210	Himself	Episode: "Age of Inheritance"
2011	Vietnam in HD	Barry Romo	Voice; Main role; 6 episodes
2015	Wahlburgers	Himself	Episode: "Drama Meets Drama"
2015–2017	Miles from Tomorrowland	Captain Joe Callisto	Voice; Recurring role; 12 episodes
2017	Love at First Glance	James Fielding	Television film
2021	Clickbait	Nicholas "Nick" Brewer	Main role (Miniseries)
2024	Seeds of Change	Himself	Documentary

=== Producer ===
Year	Title	Notes
2002	Shot in the Dark	
2005	Across the Hall	Short film
2008	Alter Eco	9 episodes
2009	Waiting for the Light to Change	
2010	Teenage Paparazzo	
2010	Compromise	
2010	Don't Quit Your Daydream	
2011	Young Farmers	
2012	My Name Is Faith	
2012	How To Make Money Selling Drugs	
2015	52: The Search for the Loneliest Whale	

=== Director ===
Year	Title	Notes
2002	Shot in the Dark	
2006	Euthanasia	
2010	Teenage Paparazzo	

=== Writer ===
Year	Title	Notes
2006	Euthanasia	
2010	Teenage Paparazzo	

=== Music videos ===
Year	Title	Artist	Role	Notes
1999	(You Drive Me) Crazy	Britney Spears	Cameo appearance	
2018	Out for Love	BAYLI	Lawyer	
