= Richie Chance =

- Born: Richard Taylor Chance; July 25, 1983 (age 43); Santa Monica, California, United States
- Occupations: Actor, Producer
- Years active: 1996-present

Richie Chance (born July 25, 1983) is an American film and television actor, producer and acting coach. He started coaching many of Hollywood's young and rising stars at "Expressions Unlimited" in 2001.

== Early life ==
Chance was born in Santa Monica, California the son of acting coaches Larry Chance and Bobbi Shaw. Growing up in his parents' acting studio, "Expression Unlimited" was a second home, working with and learning from actors such as Sir Anthony Hopkins. Chance spent his first year of high school at Notre Dame High School and finished his three years at Grant High School. He played on the Baseball team all four years of school. During his senior year on the Baseball team he was being scouted for the Los Angeles Dodgers.

== Career ==
Chance has acted on networks, such as Disney, Nickelodeon, and Fox Kids Network. He has been on the television shows House M.D and Big Time Rush. As a producer Chance is working on the feature film Prodigy. He will also be co-starring in the film with Vivica A. Fox, Michael Clarke Duncan, Robert Jayne of the film Pearl Harbor, Louis Mandylor of the film My Big Fat Greek Wedding, and Carl Weathers of the film Rocky.
