= The Prince (2014 film) =

2014 film by Brian A. Miller

- Theatrical release poster
- Directed by: Brian A. Miller
- Written by: Andre Fabrizio; Jeremy Passmore
- Produced by: George Furla; Randall Emmett; Adam Goldworm; Ho-Sung Pak; Fred Song
- Starring: Jason Patric; Bruce Willis; John Cusack; Rain; Jessica Lowndes; Johnathon Schaech; Gia Mantegna; 50 Cent
- Cinematography: Yaron Levy
- Edited by: Rick Shaine
- Music by: The Newton Brothers
- Production companies: Grindstone Entertainment Group; Aperture Entertainment; Emmett/Furla/Oasis Films; Union Investment Partners
- Distributed by: Lionsgate
- Release date: August 22, 2014
- Running time: 91 minutes
- Country: United States
- Language: English
- Budget: $18 million
- Box office: $1.3 million

The Prince is a 2014 American action thriller film directed by Brian A. Miller. It stars Jason Patric, Bruce Willis, John Cusack, and Rain. The film received a VOD (video on demand) and theatrical release by Lionsgate on August 22, 2014.

== Plot ==
Paul, a mechanic, speaks to his daughter Beth on video chat. Though she seems stressed and distracted, she says that she is fine. The two make plans for her coming visit back home after finals. Paul later receives a letter from the college which indicates that Beth has not paid tuition, and a stranger answers her phone. Paul doesn't contact the police and flies to where his daughter lives to personally investigate his daughter's disappearance. At Beth's apartment, he finds a picture of her and another young woman whom he assumes to be one of her friends. He finds her at a local bar, and she introduces herself as Angela. She reluctantly tells Paul that Beth has dropped out of college and fallen in with local drug dealers. Paul offers to pay Angela $500 to take him to New Orleans, Beth's last known location, and identify her dealer, Eddie.

When Angela points out one of Eddie's friends, Paul demands Eddie's location. The man refuses and attacks Paul, knocking him to the ground. Paul viciously beats the man and his two friends. Although disturbed by the show of violence, Angela helps Paul set up a meeting with Eddie through a cell phone that they take from his friend. At a club, Eddie denies any knowledge of Beth and ignores Paul's threats until his uncle, who witnessed Paul kill seven armed men twenty years ago, convinces Eddie to talk. Eddie says that Beth has moved on to harder drugs than he supplies and lives with a local drug kingpin known as The Pharmacy. Paul pays Angela the $500 he promised her and tells her to return home, but she refuses, as she wants to know what has happened to her friend. Paul reluctantly accepts her continued help.

Two thugs trail Paul and attempt to force his car off the road. Paul instead causes them to crash, and he interrogates the passenger, who reveals that he works for local crime-boss Omar. Paul tells the passenger to warn Omar to stay out of his way and kills the driver as he lies helpless and wounded on the ground. Angela insists that Paul explain himself. Paul tells her that he used to be a mob hit man for Omar, but the escalating violence caused him to question his loyalty. In a botched attempt to kill Omar, he accidentally killed Omar's wife and daughter instead. Now, Omar desires revenge, and Paul knows that Omar will stop at nothing to use his daughter to get to him. Paul makes arrangements with an old friend and former partner, Sam, to keep Angela safe while he recovers weaponry stashed with an old contact and confronts The Pharmacy.

The Pharmacy reveals that Omar has paid him to detain both Paul and Beth. Paul disarms one of the thugs, kills everyone in the room but Beth, and shoots his way to safety. Back at Sam's penthouse suite, the two reminisce about their exploits while waiting for an assault from Omar. Omar's men capture Beth, and Paul leaves to rescue her. At Omar's business, Paul defeats several waves of henchmen before facing Omar himself. Omar demands to know why Paul murdered his family and threatens to kill Beth in retaliation. Paul says that they were simply collateral damage and offers to let Omar live if he gives up Beth. Mark, Omar's bodyguard and adviser, engages Paul in hand-to-hand combat; the two seem evenly matched, but Paul finds a gun and kills Mark. Beth elbows Omar in the ribs and escapes from his grasp, freeing her father to take a shot and kill Omar. Beth and her father are reunited again. Angela embraces them both outside the building, and the three leave together.

== Cast ==
- Jason Patric as Paul
- Bruce Willis as Omar
- John Cusack as Sam
- Curtis "50 Cent" Jackson as The Pharmacy
- Rain as Mark
- Jessica Lowndes as Angela
- Jesse Pruett as Wilson
- Gia Mantegna as Beth
- Didi Costine as Rachel
- Bonnie Somerville as Susan
- Tim Fields as Jimmy
- Johnathon Schaech as Frank
- Andréa Burns as Janine
- Courtney B. Turk as Meagan
- Tyler Jon Olson as Eddie

== Production ==
Filming took place in Mobile, Alabama, in and around The Battle House Hotel and the adjoining RSA Battle House Tower. Bruce Willis completed his scenes on December 3, 2013, followed by Rain and Jason Patric who completed their initial scenes on December 6.

== Release ==
Lionsgate gave the film a limited release on August 22, 2014, and released it on DVD and Blu-ray October 28, 2014. As of November 11, 2022, The Prince grossed $1,289,595 in the United Arab Emirates, South Africa, Lebanon, Turkey, Spain, Egypt, Peru, Philippines, Thailand, and Singapore, from a budget of $18 million. It also grossed $2.1 million in domestic video sales.

== Critical response ==
On the review aggregator website Rotten Tomatoes, 0% of 10 critics' reviews are positive, with an average rating of 2.5/10. Metacritic, which uses a weighted average, assigned the film a score of 19 out of 100, based on 7 critics, indicating "overwhelming dislike".

Andrew Barker of Variety wrote, "John Cusack and Bruce Willis yawn their way through this basic-cable-quality actioner." Robert Abele of the Los Angeles Times called it "a Taken retread with the same old shoot-outs and showdowns". Chuck Wilson of The Village Voice wrote, "The action thriller The Prince is so bad that the most noteworthy thing about it is that the opening credits list 19 executive producers." Scott Tobias of The Dissolve rated it 1.5/5 stars and called it "a by-the-numbers affair" designed to attract undiscriminating views from video-on-demand.
