= Richard Cunningham (actor) =

English actor

Richard Cunningham is an English actor known for playing Ryall in Stephen Poliakoff's Golden Globe winning Dancing on the Edge, for the BBC with Chiwetel Ejiofor and Matthew Goode.

== Early life ==
Richard was born in Hove, in Sussex, and grew up in the small village of Wisborough Green before going on to train as an actor at the London Academy of Music and Dramatic Art.

== Television ==
Other television appearances include playing Barry Flowers in the Law and Order: UK episode Help, the Sherlock episode "A Scandal in Belgravia" and in series 1 of Law and Order UK, the first actor to play two different roles in the series. He appeared as Norman Wright in Hollyoaks, Gates with Joanna Page, Colin Chalmers in EastEnders, Doctors, the BAFTA nominated London Spy with Ben Wishaw BBC2 and Dickensian as the Reverend Crisparkle. He will soon be seen in The Royals with Elizabeth Hurley and Stan Lee's Lucky Man with James Nesbitt.

== Film ==
His film appearances include General Ramda in Rogue One: A Star Wars Story, the Warner Brothers film Sherlock Holmes: A Game of Shadows, the 2014 Hammer Films movie The Quiet Ones, with Jared Harris, The 100-Year-Old Man Who Climbed Out The Window And Disappeared, The Theory of Everything, the British thriller Breakdown with Craig Fairbrass, James Cosmo and Emmett J. Scanlan and the award-winning Andrew Haigh film 45 Years with Charlotte Rampling and Tom Courtenay who won Silvers Bears at the Berlin International Film Festival and the film won The Michael Powell Award For Best British Feature Film at the Edinburgh International Film Festival, Charlotte Rampling was also nominated for Best Actress at the 88th Academy Awards . He also appeared in Burnt with Bradley Cooper and The Man Who Knew Infinity with Dev Patel and Jeremy Irons .

== Theatre ==
Theatre roles include playing the Commander in Fuente Ovejuna at the Southwark Playhouse and Tom Stoppard's Indian Ink at the Aldwych Theatre.

== Filmography ==
| Year | Title | Role | Notes |
|---|---|---|---|
| 2011 | Sherlock Holmes: A Game of Shadows | Businessman | |
| 2013 | The 100-Year-Old Man Who Climbed Out The Window And Disappeared | The Gardener | |
| 2014 | The Quiet Ones | Provost | |
| 2014 | The Theory of Everything | Equerry | Uncredited |
| 2015 | 45 Years | Mr Watkins | |
| 2015 | The Man Who Knew Infinity | Hobson | |
| 2015 | Burnt | Michelin Inspector #1 | |
| 2016 | Breakdown | Percy Johnson | |
| 2016 | Una | Prosecutor | |
| 2016 | Rogue One | General Ramda | |
| 2018 | Gold | Stanley | |
| 2023 | Queen Charlotte: A Bridgerton Story | Lord Bute | |
