= Breakdown (2016 film) =

2016 film

- Theatrical release poster
- Directed by: Jonnie Malachi
- Written by: Jonnie Malachi
- Produced by: Luke Fairbrass
- Starring: Craig Fairbrass; James Cosmo; Mem Ferda
- Cinematography: James Friend
- Edited by: Nikki Porter
- Music by: Phil Mountford
- Production companies: Impact Entertainment; Screen 360
- Distributed by: Soda Pictures
- Release date: 15 January 2016
- Running time: 110 minutes
- Country: United Kingdom
- Language: English

Breakdown is a 2016 British action drama film written and directed by Jonnie Malachi, produced by Luke Fairbrass, and starring Craig Fairbrass, James Cosmo and Bruce Payne.

== Plot ==
A professional contract killer, haunted by visions of his violent past, spirals out of control. His work compromised as he reaches breaking point, he is forced to defend his family from his ruthless employers.

== Cast ==
- Craig Fairbrass as Alfie Jennings
- James Cosmo as Albert Chapman
- Emmett J. Scanlan as Connor Moran
- Mem Ferda as Hakan Abaci
- Tamer Hassan as Iraz Kartal
- Bruce Payne as Peter Grainger
- Olivia Grant as Catherine Jennings
- Rab Affleck as Ronnie Anderson
- David Bark-Jones as Benedict Morgan-Wells
- Nick Cornwall as Philip Boden
- Brian Nickels as Moses
- Amanda Wass as Maya Jennings
- Richard Cunningham as Percy Johnson
- Rodrig Andrisan as Josef
- Bethan Wright as Sinead

== Production ==
The film was shot on location in London and Essex. This film was partly financed by Red Rock Entertainment.

== Reception ==
The film has received mixed reviews. On the review aggregator website Rotten Tomatoes, 10% of 10 critics' reviews are positive.

Jeremy Aspinall of the Radio Times stated that 'it's not the most original of premises, but Fairbrass proves a rugged presence and Cosmo is a terrifying villain'. Emma Thrower of Empire stated that 'Breakdown spirals into a pool of clichés and never manages to drag itself out'. Tony Peters stated that Craig Fairbrass gave 'a fine performance' as 'an ageing hitman who himself becomes a target' which 'lifts this thriller above the norm'. In Andy Jones' view 'British director Jonnie Malachi’s gangster pastiche Breakdown is a vicious mongrel of a movie, frothing and snarling but with a fatal lack of bite in its bark'.
