= Bula Quo! =

- Directed by: Stuart St Paul
- Written by: Jean Heard; Stuart St. Paul
- Produced by: Tim Major; Simon Porter; Stuart St Paul
- Starring: Jon Lovitz; Craig Fairbrass; Laura Aikman; Francis Rossi; Rick Parfitt
- Cinematography: Chas Bain
- Edited by: Lewis Albrow
- Music by: Status Quo as Andy Bown; Rick Parfitt; John 'Rhino' Edwards; Francis Rossi; Matt Letley
- Production companies: INDY UK Films Limited; Status Quo Films
- Distributed by: Universal Pictures
- Release date: 5 July 2013
- Running time: 91 minutes
- Countries: United Kingdom; Fiji
- Languages: English; Fijian

Bula Quo!, also known as Guitars, Guns and Paradise, is a 2013 British adventure comedy film cowritten and directed by Stuart St Paul and starring Jon Lovitz, Craig Fairbrass, Laura Aikman and Status Quo musicians Francis Rossi and Rick Parfitt.

== Synopsis ==
The film is set in the Pacific island country of Fiji and tells the story of rock band Status Quo becoming entangled in a local mafia operation.

== Cast ==
- Francis Rossi as Francis
- Rick Parfitt as Rick
- Jon Lovitz as Wilson
- Craig Fairbrass as Simon
- Laura Aikman as Caroline
- Matt Kennard as Dave
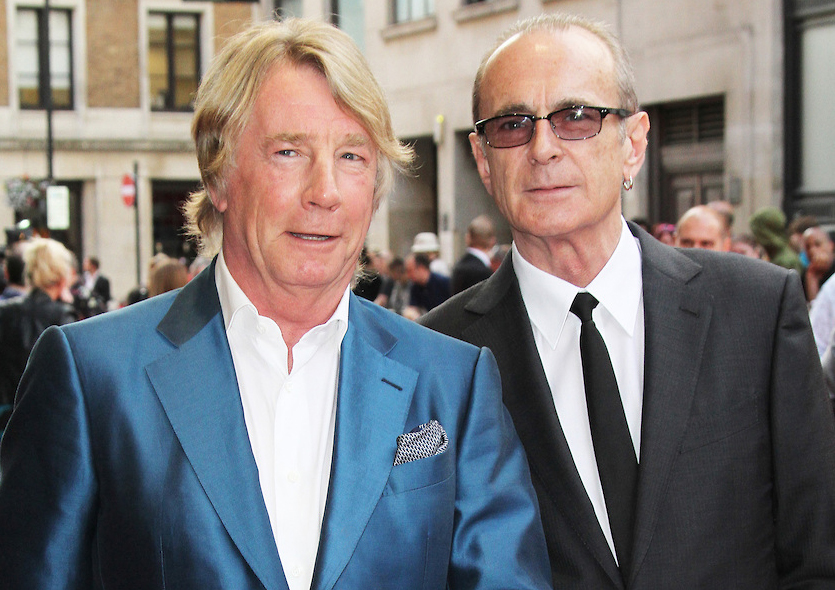
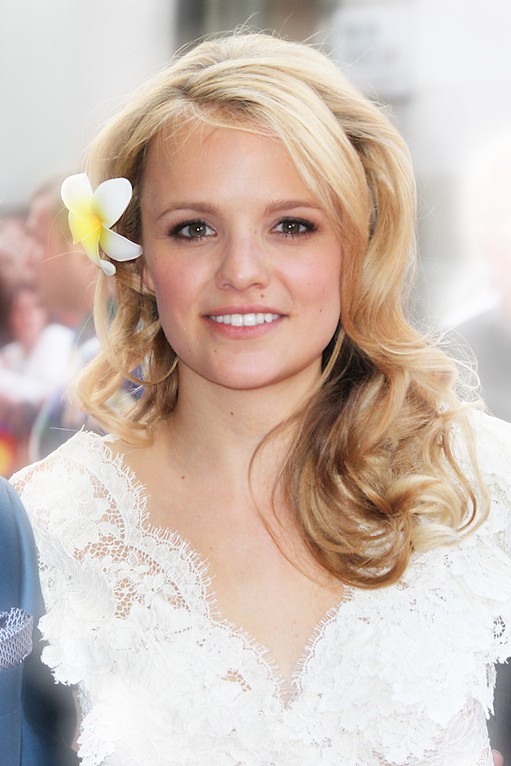
Rick Parfitt and Francis Rossi of Status Quo and Laura Aikman at the 2013 UK film premiere of Bula Quo!

== Production ==
The film's production used to its advantage a scheme set up by the previous Labour Government of Gordon Brown, which allowed taxpayers to invest a certain amount of money in low-to-medium budget United Kingdom films as an incentive to expand the British film industry and/or keep people working steadily on it. Although Bula Quo! was made primarily in Fiji it was classified as a UK production because of the use of a primarily British cast and film crew. Several other (technically) British films released at the time were made using this same tax incentives, including Hitchcock (2012) and Cleanskin (2012).

== Reception ==
Bula Quo! was a box-office disaster at the time of its release receiving mostly negative reviews from critics. Rotten Tomatoes gave the film an aggregated score of 27%.
