= House of the Rising Sun (film) =

- Theatrical release poster
- Directed by: Brian A. Miller
- Written by: Chuck Hustmyre and Brian A. Miller
- Based on: House of the Rising Sun by Chuck Hustmyre
- Produced by: John G. Carbone; Mark Sanders; Kelly Slattery; Jude S. Walko
- Starring: Dave Bautista; Amy Smart; Dominic Purcell; Craig Fairbrass; Danny Trejo
- Cinematography: William Eubank
- Music by: Norman Orenstein
- Production company: Berkshire Axis Media
- Distributed by: Grindstone Entertainment
- Release date: July 19, 2011
- Running time: 90 minutes
- Country: United States
- Language: English
- Budget: $1.5 million

House of the Rising Sun is a 2011 American action drama film starring Dave Bautista. Filming took place in Grand Rapids, Michigan. The screenplay was written by Chuck Hustmyre and Brian A. Miller, based on Chuck Hustmyre's novel of the same title.

== Plot ==
Ray Shane is an ex-vice cop trying to turn his life around after spending five years in prison on corruption charges. He works as the head of security for "The House of the Rising Sun", a strip club that secretly houses an illegal gambling den. During a night on the job, a masked gang hold him at gunpoint to rob the club of $300,000, ending with the club owner's son, Peter, getting killed in a shootout. When the police arrive, they suspect Ray acted as the inside man for the robbers.

Ray's relationship with one of club's girls, Jenny Porter, is rocky following her regretful affair with Tony, the right-hand man of their boss, while he was imprisoned. Ray is enlisted by his boss, small-time gangster Vinnie Marcella, to track down his son's killers. He finds help from his former police colleague Jimmy LaGrange, who lends him information in his pursuit, but Vinnie and Tony start to believe they wrongly trusted him and that he is behind the robbery.

That night, Tony and his partner, Joey, set up a hit on Ray at his motel. After escaping, Ray stays with Jenny at her apartment, Tony finds him there, but Jenny does not let him in. During their conversation, she tells Ray she became a call girl only until his prison sentence ended. He forgives her and they make love. The next day, Ray meets with an informant, Charlie Blackstone, finding out Tony is planning to take over Vinnie's position. He gets more info from one of the only surviving shooters involved with the robbery, the crime was organized by an unknown mastermind who had the crew whacked to protect themselves. The shooter refuses to bear testimony, and Ray is forced to kill him in self-defense.

Tony goes to see Vinnie's older brother, Carlos, whom Charlie works for. However, Tony is ordered to kill Charlie upon hearing he spoke with Ray, luring Charlie out of his house to kill him while Joey uses a pocket knife stolen from Ray to murder Tony's wife and frame him. On the run, with the help of Jenny, Ray discovers Tony was involved in the shooters' deaths. Confronting Carlos with the development, it is revealed that Tony's wife Priscilla is aiding his agenda by sleeping around with Carlos and distracting him so that Tony can take over the club. Offended, Priscilla shoots Carlos dead, and Ray kills her in return.

Ray contacts the police. He informs Vinnie at his office that they were both set up, with Tony framing Ray for the robbery and pitting Carlos against Vinnie. Tony shows up with the money to confirm the truth, with Jenny being held hostage by Joey. Tony is bitter that Carlos, whom he worked with to build the club, handed it down to Vinnie, who vows revenge for the death of his son before Tony kills him. Jimmy shows up, having been bribed to kill Ray for Tony, but instead gives Ray a gun causing a shoot-out. Jimmy and Joey are both killed, and Tony takes off with Jenny down to the floor of the club. There, Jenny escapes with the money and tosses it to the strippers.

In the parking lot, Ray fights Tony until the police arrive, and he tries to convince them Tony orchestrated the robbery and set him up. When Tony shoots towards Jenny, the police gun him down. Jenny pleads to the police that Ray is innocent, but her testimony is insufficient, and they still arrest him and take him into custody. In the end, Jenny is able to kiss Ray for a final time before he is driven off back to prison.

== Cast ==
- Dave Bautista as Ray Shane
- Amy Smart as Jenny Porter
- Danny Trejo as Carlos Marcella
- Lyle Kanouse as Vinnie Marcella
- John G. Carbone as Pete Marcella
- Dominic Purcell as Tony Zello
- Debra Harrison-Lowe as Priscilla Zello
- Franz Klain as Joey
- Craig Fairbrass as Charlie Blackstone
- Brian Vander Ark as Detective Jimmy LaGrange
- Tim Fields as Detective Carl Landry
- Roy Oraschin as Dylan Sylvester
- Brian A. Miller as Mack
- Jesse Pruett as Detective Slattery
- Natalie Light as Dallas
- Imani Lee as Cleo Harris
- Jude S. Walko as Druggie

== Reception ==
Mike Scott of the Times-Picayune said "There's potential for a by-the-numbers underworld detective story. Unfortunately, that potential never is realized in Miller's film, a flaccid and convoluted tale of double-crosses."

Brian Orndorf said "Muddled and frequently comatose, the picture yearns to be a turbulent ride of crooks and cops, yet it never rises to the occasion, generating a feeble mystery sold by a cast of brutes trying to pass themselves off as actors."

== Awards ==
Wins

- Action On Film International Film Festival: Action on Film Award; 2011. Bautista also won the Performer of the Year award for this film.
