= The Great Dome Robbery =

- Directed by: Gabriel Range
- Written by: Steve Barker; Gabriel Range
- Produced by: Gabriel Range; Rob MacIver
- Starring: Craig Fairbrass; George Innes; Gerard Monaco; Martin Herdman; Keith Lancaster
- Narrated by: Alan Ford
- Cinematography: David Meadows
- Edited by: Natasha Greenberg
- Music by: Mark Thomas
- Production company: Granada Television
- Distributed by: Channel 5 Television
- Release date: 13 July 2002 (United Kingdom)
- Country: United Kingdom
- Language: English

The Great Dome Robbery is a 2002 crime drama film directed by Gabriel Range, based on the actual Millennium Dome raid of 2000.

== Plot ==
A group of international jewel thieves is planning to steal the world's largest diamond from its show display at the Millennium Dome, unaware that they have been under police surveillance from the moment they had begun planning their caper.

== Cast ==
- Craig Fairbrass as Ray Betson
- George Innes as Terry Millman
- Gerard Monaco as Aido Ciarrocchi
- Martin Herdman as John Swinfield
- Keith Lancaster as Alex Bartlett
- Jonathan Linsley as James Hurley
- Iain McKee as Guy
- Alan Ford as Narrator
- Terry Bird as Will Cockram
- Justin Salinger as Lee Wenham
- Carl Rigg as Jon Shatford
- Sean Carlsen as Kevin Meredith
- Mark Christopher Collins as Police Officer
- Anthony Travis as Police Officer
- Jason Daly as Police Officer Kevin Richards
- Jane Frampton as Car Crash Victim
- Chris MacDonnell as D.C. Chris Miller
