= George Innes =

British actor (born 1938)

- Born: 8 March 1938 (age 88); Stepney, East London, England
- Education: London Academy of Music and Dramatic Art
- Occupation: Actor
- Years active: 1963–present

George Innes (born 8 March 1938) is a British actor.

== Stage career ==
Innes was born in Stepney, East London, and began his career with the National Theatre of Great Britain under Laurence Olivier. He trained at Toynbee Hall and the London Academy of Music and Dramatic Art, where he received the Shakespeare Cup for excellence. He later appeared in stage productions including The Dream of Peter Mann and other National Theatre performances. His final year of study and training was at the Bristol Old Vic School. He worked with Dunlop again in The Pantomime at the Bristol Old Vic, before a season at Nottingham Playhouse with Dunlop and John Neville.

Other theatre credits include working for Royal Court Theatre production company in Chips with Everything, which played in the West End and on Broadway. He appeared in Othello (understudying Frank Finlay's Iago) with Olivier at the National Theatre at Chichester and The Old Vic. Other performances in this period include roles in Dutch Courtesan, Mother Courage, Hobson's Choice, and The Master Builder. At the National Theatre at South Bank, he appeared in Tom Stoppard's Jumpers, Bedroom Farce (directed by Peter Hall, transferring to the West End), and The Vortex at the Ahmanson Theatre in Los Angeles, (with Bob Ackerman directing). In 1993–94 he appeared in The Rise and Fall of Little Voice with the Steppenwolf Theatre Company, with Simon Curtis directing in Chicago, a production which appeared on Broadway. Returning to London, he performed at the Southwark Playhouse in Rosmersholm (1997) and Riders to the Sea (2005).

In 2009 he appeared off-Broadway in The Lodger at the Workshop Theatre (Harris Yulin directing). There he developed his one-man show called Tribute, based on the Ages of Man by Sir John Gielgud. It was also performed at The Players, a theatrical club in New York City. The show played during the August 2009 Edinburgh Fringe Festival to excellent reviews. In March 2010, he performed Tribute at the Barron's Court Pub Theatre in London, receiving these reviews: "... the whole show centres around a superb talent: not Gielgud's but that of George Innes. The veteran performer has a marvellously warming presence with a deep velvet voice that could make a line from Avenue Q sound profound ... Tribute really is a display of extraordinary talent." He performed the show at the Workshop Theatre in New York, touring westward to California.

== Filmography ==
Year	Title	Role	Director	Notes
1963	Billy Liar	Stamp	John Schlesinger	
1968	Charlie Bubbles	Garage Attendant	Albert Finney	
1968	Before Winter Comes	Bill	J. Lee Thompson	
1969	The Italian Job	Bill Bailey	Peter Collinson	
1970	Scars of Dracula	Servant	Roy Ward Baker	Uncredited
1971	The Last Valley	Vornez	James Clavell	
1971	Gumshoe	Bookshop Proprietor	Stephen Frears	
1972	Pope Joan	Monk	Michael Anderson	
1974	Where's Johnny?	Fingers	David Eady	
1977	A Bridge Too Far	Sergeant Macdonald	Richard Attenborough	
1978	The Medusa Touch	Van Driver	Jack Gold	
1978	Sweeney 2	Pete Beale	Tom Clegg	
1978	The Odd Job	Caretaker	Peter Medak	
1979	Quadrophenia	Cafe Owner	Franc Roddam	
1984	Ordeal by Innocence	Archie Leach	Desmond Davis	
1985	Morons from Outer Space	Stanley Benson	Mike Hodges	
1988	The Most Dangerous Man in the World	Kolev	Gavin Millar	
2000	Shiner	'Little Pete' Jones	John Irvin	
2001	Last Orders	Bernie	Fred Schepisi	
2002	The Great Dome Robbery	Terry Millman	Gabriel Range	
2003	Master and Commander: The Far Side of the World	Joe Plaice, Able Seaman	Peter Weir	
2004	Unstoppable	Korean War veteran	David Carson	
2005	Things To Do Before You're 30	Don	Simon Shore	
2007	Stardust	Soothsayer	Matthew Vaughn	
2007	Elizabeth: The Golden Age	Burton	Shekhar Kapur	

== Television ==
Year	Title	Role	Notes
1963	BBC Sunday-Night Play	Johnny Bowen	Episode: "You Can't Throw Your Mates"
1965	Knock on Any Door	"Thumper" Taylor	Episode: "First Offender"
1966	Drama 61-67	Private Biggs	Episode: "Conduct to the Prejudice"
1967	The Wednesday Play	Frank/Paul Morris	2 episodes
1967	The Informer	Cooper	Episode: "The Sacrifice"
1968	Virgin of the Secret Service	Domino	Episode: "Pride of Assassins"
1969	The Avengers	Shaw	Episode: "Bizarre"
1969	The Main Chance	George Wilkinson	Episode: "What About Justice?"
1969	The Gold Robbers	Dillo	2 episodes
1970	NBC Experiment in Television	Lemon	Episode: "The Engagement"
1970	Callan	Arnold	Episode: "A Village Called "G""
1970	Manhunt	Voigt	Episode: "Degrade and Rule"
1971	The Mind of Mr. J.G. Reeder	Sir Clive	Episode: "Man with a Strange Tattoo"
1971	Budgie	Jumbo Stevens	Episode: "A Pair of Charlies"
1971	Jason King	Gerard	Episode: "Wanna Buy a Television Series?"
1971-1973	Upstairs, Downstairs	Alfred	6 episodes
1972-1973	The Protectors	Marcus/Luigi	2 episodes
1972-1975	Z-Cars	Arthur/Richard Joiner	2 episodes
1972-1976	Dixon of Dock Green	Clarry Barnes/Phil Harvey	2 episodes
1973	Barlow at Large	Hanson	Episode: "Wheelbarrows"
1973	The Rivals of Sherlock Holmes	Adolph Schonberg	Episode: "The Moabite Cypher"
1973	ITV Sunday Night Theatre	Frank	Episode: "Willy"
1973	New Scotland Yard	Barry Robins	Episode: "Weight of Evidence"
1973	Whodunnit?	Mr. Hurst	Episode: "Did He Fall or Was He Pushed?"
1973	Diamonds on Wheels	Insp. Timothy	TV movie
1973-1975	Six Days of Justice	Evan/Mr. Gill	2 episodes
1974	The Adventures of Black Beauty	Jake	Episode: "The Horse Breaker"
1974	Coronation Street	Stuart Draper	4 episodes
1974-1977	Crown Court	Various	3 serials
1975	Thriller	Zac	Episode: "Where the Action Is"
1975	Churchill's People	Thomas	Episode: "The Whip of Heaven"
1975	Shadows	The Railwayman	Episode: "The Waiting Room"
1975	CBS Children's Film Festival	Fingers	Episode: "Where's Johnny?"
1976	Open All Hours	Used Car Salesman	Episode: "A Mattress on Wheels"
1976	Hadleigh	Teddy Monks	Episode: "The Story of a Panic"
1976	The Molly Wopsies	Sergeant Needler	Miniseries
1976	The Good Life	Constable	Episode: "The Happy Event"
1976	Lucky Feller	William/Wedding Guest	2 episodes
1976	I, Claudius	Quintus Justus	Episode: "A God in Colchester"
1976	The Melting Pot		Episode 6
1976-1978	Play for Today	Various	4 episodes, including The After-Dinner Joke
1976-1984	Jackanory Playhouse	Various	3 episodes
1977	Yes, Honestly	Policeman	Episode: "Entertaining Mr. Roscoe"
1977	Get Some In!	Flight-Sergeant Wells	4 episodes
1977-1978	You're Only Young Twice	Sergeant Hobble	3 episodes
1978	BBC Play of the Month	Mr. Hodge	Episode: "Flint"
1978	Hazell	Cliff Abrey	Episode: "Hazell Plays Solomon"
1978	The Sweeney	Willoughby	Episode: "Victims"
1979	Danger UXB	Jim Wilkins	Miniseries
1980	Fantasy Island		
1980	Turtle's Progress	Cedric Thomson	Episode 2.6
1980	Shōgun	Vinck	Miniseries
1980	Hammer House of Horror	Cedric	Episode: "The Thirteenth Reunion"
1980	A Tale of Two Cities	Jeremiah 'Jerry' Cruncher	TV movie
1981	Masada	Titus	Part I
1981	Meeting of Minds	Oliver Cromwell	Episode: "Oliver Cromwell"
1981	Dick Turpin	Smith	Episode: "Dick Turpin's Greatest Adventure"
1981	Goliath Awaits	Dave Winter	TV movie
1982	Ivanhoe	Wamba	TV movie
1982	Q.E.D.	Phipps	Miniseries
1982	Voyagers!	Black Bill Scroggins	Episode: "Old Hickory and the Pirate"
1982	Hart to Hart	King Rashid	Episode: "In the Hart of the Night"
1983	M.A.S.H	Dr. Randolph Kent	Episode: "UN, the Night and Music"
1983	Hill Street Blues	James Willett Frame	3 episodes
1984	Minder	Harry Lynch	Episode: "Rocky Eight and a Half"
1984	The Fall Guy	Leonardo Vincenzo	Episode: "Olympic Quest"
1984	Masquerade	Inspector Corday	Episode: "The French Correction"
1984	Magnum, P.I.	David Billingsworth	Episode: "Echoes of the Mind"
1984	Ellis Island	Ellis Island Doctor	Part One
1984	Comrade Dad	Black Market Stallholder	Pilot
1985	Cover Up	Sims	Episode: "The Assassin"
1985	Cagney & Lacey	Josef Hermann	Episode: "Two Grand"
1985	C.A.T.S. Eyes	Driscoll	Episode: "Blue for Danger"
1985	Alfred Hitchcock Presents	Charles Dean	Episode: "Wake Me When I'm Dead"
1985	Lytton's Diary	Gregory	Episode: "The Silly Season"
1987	Rumpole of the Bailey	Hugh Timson	Episode: "Rumpole and the Blind Tasting"
1988	Noble House	Travkin	Miniseries
1988	Tickets for the Titanic	Villiante Bus Driver	Episode: "Everyone a Winner"
1989	Casualty	Geoff Coxon	Episode: "Union"
1989-2006	The Bill	China Seller/Ronnie Brandt	2 episodes
1990	After Henry	DS Renton	Episode: "The Mysterious Affair at Bygone Books"
1990	Newhart	Regis Drayman	Episode: "Father Goose"
1990	Zorro	Ribicoff/The Falcon	2 episodes
1991	The House of Eliott	George Wakefield	Episode 1.9
1992	Screen One	John Olding	Episode: "Adam Bede"
1992	A Dangerous Man: Lawrence After Arabia	English Reporter	TV movie
1992	Haggard	Catesby	Episode: "Condemned"
1992	The Ruth Rendell Mysteries	Joe Peterlee	Episode: "The Mouse in the Corner Part One"
1993	Seekers	Kenny Graham	Episode 1
2001	The Life and Adventures of Nicholas Nickleby	Newman Noggs	TV movie
2001	Midsomer Murders	Jackie Marsh	Episode: "Who Killed Cock Robin?"
2001	Peak Practice	Ron Harris	Episode: "Outsiders 2"
2003	Doctors	Stan Laughton	Episode: "Stone Walls Do Not a Prison Make"
2004	The Brief	Jack	4 episodes
