= The Runway (film) =

2010 Irish-Lux-Swedish film

- Theatrical film poster
- Directed by: Ian Power
- Written by: Ian Power
- Produced by: Macdara Kelleher; Brendan McDonald; Ian Power
- Starring: Jamie Kierans; Demián Bichir; Kerry Condon; James Cosmo
- Cinematography: P.J. Dillon
- Edited by: Amine Jaber
- Music by: Gast Waltzing
- Release dates: July 10, 2010 (Galway); June 10, 2011 (Ireland)
- Running time: 101 mins.
- Countries: Ireland; Luxembourg; Sweden
- Languages: English; Spanish

The Runway is a 2010 international dramedy film, directed and written by Ian Power. It stars Jamie Kierans, Demián Bichir, Kerry Condon, and James Cosmo. It premiered at the Galway Film Fleadh in 2010, before being released in Ireland in 2011.

== Synopsis ==
The citizens of Ireland's County Cork come to the aid of a South American pilot who has crash landed in their town.

== Cast ==
- Jamie Kierans as Paco Thomas
- Demián Bichir as Ernesto Cordoba
- Kerry Condon as Grace Thomas
- James Cosmo as Sutherland
- Donncha Crowley as Mayor Tommy Carmody
- John Carpenter as "Frogs" Connors
- Pat Laffan as Manus
- Caroline Power as Laura Kelly
- Bruno Bichir as Francisco De Caldus
- Mark Doherty as Eddie
- John Kavanagh as Seamus
- Aidan O'Hare as Martin

== Reception ==
On the review aggregator website Rotten Tomatoes, 80% of 5 critics' reviews are positive, with an average rating of 6.30/10.

Susan Granger of SSG Syndicate called the film "adventurous and engaging, particularly for those who love Irish cinema". Roe McDermott of Hot Press lauded newcomer Jamie Kierans for being "an irresistibly cheeky and likable lead". And Ronan Doyle of Next Projection via Letterboxd calls it "a quiet comic delight".

Frank Scheck of The Hollywood Reporter praised actors James Cosmo ("entertaining") and Demián Bichir ("soulful presence"). Cahir Doherty of Irish Central applauded the "remarkable, feel-good achievement". Boyd Van Hoeij of Cineuropa commended Kerry Condon's performance as "a charming characterization".

On the other hand, Jay Weissberg of Variety opined that the film is "blandly formulaic" with "a distracting Irish indie rock soundtrack". And Kerry Lengel of The Arizona Republic stated, "The eccentric characters and wacky story line are merely camouflage for a movie with a heart that's pure Hollywood."
