= Craig Fairbrass =

English actor (born 1964)

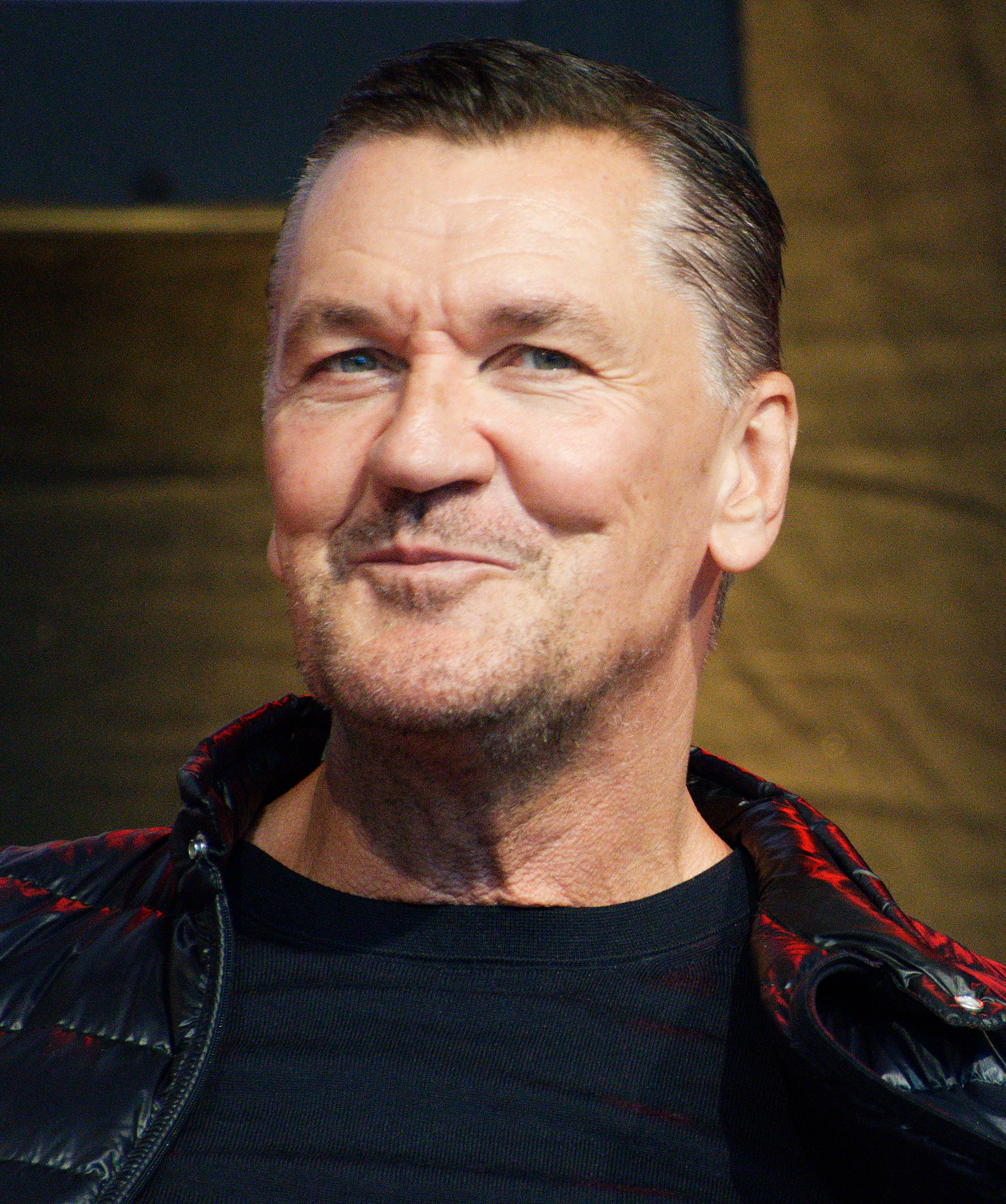
- Fairbrass in 2023
- Born: 15 January 1964 (age 62); Mile End, London, England
- Occupations: Actor; producer; screenwriter
- Years active: 1979–present
- Spouse: Elke Kellick (m. 1987)
- Children: 2
- Website: craigfairbrass.co.uk

Craig John Fairbrass (born 15 January 1964) is an English actor, producer and screenwriter. Over a career spanning more than four decades, he has worked across British and American film, television and video games. Initially recognised for roles in For Queen and Country (1988), London's Burning (1990), Prime Suspect and the Hollywood action film Cliffhanger (1993), he later gained widespread recognition for portraying Dan Sullivan in the BBC soap opera EastEnders (1999–2001)

From the mid-2000s onwards, Fairbrass established himself as a leading actor in British independent action and crime films. He has starred in productions including The Outsider, London Heist (which he also co-wrote), Breakdown (2014), Muscle (2019), Villain (2020), A Violent Man (2022) and Netflix's live-action adaptation of One Piece TV series (2023).

Fairbrass is closely associated with the Rise of the Footsoldier franchise through his portrayal of Pat Tate, having starred in five films in the series, including Rise of the Footsoldier, The Pat Tate Years, Origins, Vengeance and Retribution. The role has become one of the defining performances of his career and established him as one of the genre's most recognisable leading actors.

Alongside his screen career, Fairbrass has built an extensive career in voice and performance capture. He is best known for voicing Sergeant Gaz in Call of Duty series from 2007 to 2016; notably Gaz in Call of Duty 4: Modern Warfare (2007) and Simon "Ghost" Riley in Call of Duty: Modern Warfare 2 (2009), performances that have become among the most recognisable in the Call of Duty franchise.

== Early life ==
Craig John Fairbrass was born at Mile End Hospital in London on 15 January 1964, the son of seamstress Maureen (née Bryan) and dock worker Jack Fairbrass. He grew up in Stepney and has a younger sister named Lindsey. After being expelled from Eaglesfield Boys Comprehensive School in Woolwich at the age of 15, he successfully auditioned for the National Youth Theatre. He then began searching for a talent agent to represent him, supporting himself financially by working as a roofer in the daytime, and working evenings as a doorman, at what he would later call some of the "less desirable nightspots" in southeast London. From these jobs, he saved enough money to buy a small sandwich shop at Woolwich Market, for a while, until he began to secure more acting roles.

== Career ==
After a few years of walk-on roles in Emmerdale, Three Up Two Down, and Shelley, Fairbrass made his first real TV appearance as an actor in the 1984 BBC television series Big Deal as Nev in the episode "Fighting chance" followed by another BBC role in Tucker's Luck. He made his feature film acting debut as D.C. Challoner in the 1988 Working Title thriller For Queen and Country opposite Academy Award winner Denzel Washington.

Film and television appearances quickly followed, including the Ray Winstone film Tank Malling, and the 1990 Channel 4 Film The Final Frame, playing Franklin, the right-hand man of pop star East, who was played by former Madness frontman Suggs. He also landed a regular role as Gary "Technique" Pagnall in the ITV drama series London's Burning in 1990. That same year, Fairbrass was cast opposite Helen Mirren as Detective Inspector Frank Burkin in the BAFTA/Emmy Award-winning original Prime Suspect 1 and 2.

In 1991, he travelled to Los Angeles and secured his first Hollywood acting role in the 1993 action blockbuster Cliffhanger with Sylvester Stallone. This led to roles in independent films with lead roles in Beyond Bedlam (1994), with Elizabeth Hurley, Galaxis (1995), with Brigitte Nielsen, Proteus, Killing Time, and Darklands.

In 1999, Fairbrass landed the regular role of Dan Sullivan in EastEnders, leaving the show in August 2001. He then took the lead role of Ray Betson in the Channel Five crime drama The Great Dome Robbery.

Fairbrass returned to the U.S., starring in the Chris Klein comedy, The Long Weekend, and as Henry Caine opposite Nathan Fillion in White Noise 2. In February 2007, he appeared as the renegade Jaffa, Arkad, in the episode "Talion" in the final season of Stargate SG-1, as a guest lead in Terminator: The Sarah Connor Chronicles, opposite Lena Headey, and as guest lead Devon Burke, a rogue MI5 agent in David Mamet's hit show The Unit.

In 2007, he starred in the feature film Rise of the Footsoldier, as real life gangster Pat Tate, and opposite Jason Statham in The Bank Job. The following year, he joined Til Schweiger in the game-based action film Far Cry (2008). In 2011, Fairbrass took the co-lead in the crime thriller St George's Day; other lead roles include Vikingdom 3D, House of the Rising Sun, opposite Dave Bautista, Hijacked, and Get Lucky and Let me Survive.

In 2012, Fairbrass took his first lead role in a US action thriller The Outsider, which starred Jason Patric, James Caan and Shannon Elizabeth. In Bula Quo!, he co-starred alongside Rick Parfitt and Francis Rossi. In 2014, he took the lead alongside James Cosmo, Bruce Payne, Emmett Scanlan, and Olivia Grant in the psychological thriller Breakdown.

In 2015, he played the lead role of Jack Cregan in the revenge thriller London Heist alongside Steven Berkoff, which he also co-wrote. The film was produced by his son Luke Fairbrass. Craig Fairbrass went on to win the Best Actor Award at the 2016 Marbella International Film Festival for the role.

In 2017, Fairbrass reprised his role of Pat Tate in Rise of the Footsoldier 3: The Pat Tate Years, a prequel to the 2007 original and proved to be Fairbrass's most powerful performance to date, winning him the best actor award at the 2018 National Film Awards in London.

In 2020, Fairbrass played Eddie Franks in the London crime thriller Villain. He reprised his role of Pat Tate in the fifth instalment of Rise of the Footsoldier Origins, directed by Nick Nevern.

In 2022, Fairbrass starred in Ross McCall's A Violent Man.

=== Recent television and film work ===
Since 2023, Fairbrass has expanded beyond his long-running gangster roles with prominent appearances in international television. He portrayed Chef Zeff (Red-Leg Zeff) in Netflix's live-action adaptation of One Piece, appearing in multiple episodes during the first season. The series became one of Netflix's most-watched international productions and introduced him to a broader global audience.

In 2023, he also appeared as Guy in the BBC crime thriller Boat Story, alongside Daisy Haggard and Paterson Joseph. The series received positive reviews for its dark comedy and crime narrative.

In 2025, Fairbrass starred as Lee in the British independent drama Trapped, directed by Roland Manookian.

=== Voice ===
Fairbrass provided additional voices in the video game Call of Duty 4: Modern Warfare (2007), then again as one of the most iconic characters in the game's history as Ghost in Call of Duty: Modern Warfare 2 (2009) and as various characters in Call of Duty: Modern Warfare 3. Fairbrass also voiced a main role in the video game Battlefield V (2018) during the War Stories campaign mission, “Under No Flag” as George Mason.

== Personal life ==
Fairbrass married former Page Three glamour model Elke Kellick in 1987. They have two sons together.

Fairbrass has been typecast as a hard British gangster and while he enjoys playing film roles revolving around knife crime, criminal gangs and violence, Fairbrass stated in a 2020 interview: "Every time I meet on these films I always talk about 'Can we turn the violence down? Can we stay away from certain things where we don't want to glorify?' I'm very wary of the violence that is in the films. It's like playing Call of Duty [...] people say to me, 'How do you feel that you're [...] voicing characters in games that could be the instigation for someone to go out and commit murder?' I'm just an actor. At the end of the day, it's all make believe. Some people take it a step further."

== Filmography ==
=== Film ===
Year	Title	Role	Notes
1979	Scum	Extra	Uncredited
1984	Real Life	Boyfriend	
1988	Soursweet	Driver	
1988	For Queen and Country	Challoner	
1989	Tank Malling	Jackie	
1993	Cliffhanger	Delmar	
1994	Beyond Bedlam	Terry Hamilton	
1995	Galaxis	Tarquin	
1995	Proteus	Alex, DEA Agent	
1996	Darklands	Frazer Truick	
1998	Killing Time	Det. Robert Bryant	
1999	Weak at Denise	Roy	
2002	The Great Dome Robbery	Ray Betson	
2004	Se sarà luce sarà bellissimo - Moro: Un'altra storia	Brigatista	
2005	The Long Weekend	Frank Silver	
2007	White Noise: The Light	Henry Caine	
2007	Rise of the Footsoldier	Pat Tate	
2008	The Bank Job	Nick Barton	
2008	Far Cry	Jason Parker	
2009	31 North 62 East	Major Paul Davidson	
2010	The Shouting Men	Tony	
2010	Just for the Record	Malcolm 'Mental Fists' Wickes	
2010	Devil's Playground	Cole	
2010	Dead Cert	Freddy 'Dead Cert' Frankham	
2010	Freight	Jed	
2011	House of the Rising Sun	Charlie Blackstone	
2012	Deranged	Anthony	
2012	Hijacked	Bruce Leib	
2012	St George's Day	Ray Collishaw	
2013	Get Lucky	Sebastian	
2013	Bula Quo!	Simon	
2013	Vikingdom	Sven	
2013	Let Me Survive	Sean	
2013	Saving Santa	Mercenary	Voice
2014	The Outsider	Lex Walker	Also writer
2014	The Hooligan Factory	Mickey	
2015	Rise of the Footsoldier 2: Reign of the General	Pat Tate	Flashback
2016	Breakdown	Alfie Jennings	Also executive producer
2017	London Heist	Jack Cregan	Also executive producer and writer
2017	Rise of the Footsoldier 3: The Pat Tate Story	Pat Tate	Also executive producer
2019	Avengement	Lincoln Burgess	
2019	Rise of the Footsoldier: Marbella	Pat Tate	
2019	Muscle	Terry	
2020	Villain	Eddie Franks	
2021	Rise of the Footsoldier: Origins	Pat Tate	
2022	A Violent Man	Steve Mackelson	
2023	Rise of the Footsoldier: Vengeance	Pat Tate	
2026	Rise of the Footsoldier: Retribution	Pat Tate	

=== Television ===
Year	Title	Role	Notes
1980	Shelley	Darth	Episode: "May the Best Man Win"
1984	Big Deal	Nev	Episode: "Fighting Chance"
1985	Who, Sir? Me, Sir?	Lifeguard	Episode: #1.2
1985	Tucker's Luck	Dino	Episode: #3.9
1986	Emmerdale	Gypsy Man	8 episodes
1987	No Place Like Home	Macho	Episode: "The Marathon"
1987	Three Up, Two Down	Man On The Beach	Episode: "Come Sail with Me"
1990	The Final Frame	Franklin	Television film
1990–1991	London's Burning	Gary "Technique" Pagnall	7 episodes
1991	Prime Suspect	D.I. Frank Burkin	Television miniseries
1992	The Return of Shelley	Darth	Episode: "Accountants & Zulus"
1992	Prime Suspect 2	DI Frank Burkin	Television miniseries
1998	Duck Patrol	Hero	8 episodes
1998	The Bill	Steve André	Episode: "All for One"
1999	Soldier of Fortune, Inc.	John Harkin	Episode: "Figure Eight"
1999	An Unsuitable Job for a Woman	Jason	Episode: "Living on Risk"
1999–2001	EastEnders	Dan Sullivan	137 episodes
2004	The Courtroom	Steven Smith	Episode: "Twice Bitten"
2006	Dream Team	Terry Rose	Episode: "War of the Roses"
2007	Stargate SG-1	Arkad	Episode: "Talion"
2007	The Unit	Devon Burke	Episode: "Side Angle Side"
2008	Terminator: The Sarah Connor Chronicles	Fake Sarkissian	Episode: "What He Beheld"
2012	Métal Hurlant Chronicles	Timarek	Episode: "Three on a Match"
2023	One Piece	Chef Zeff	4 episodes
2023	Boat Story	Guy	6 episodes

=== Video games ===
Year	Title	Role	Notes
2007	Call of Duty 4: Modern Warfare	Gaz, Wallcroft, additional voices	
2009	Call of Duty Modern Warfare 2	Lt. Simon "Ghost" Riley	
2010	Call of Duty Black Ops	Swift	
2011	Call of Duty Modern Warfare 3	Wallcroft, additional voices	
2012	Infex	Doyle	
2016	Call of Duty 4: Modern Warfare Remastered	Gaz, Wallcroft, additional voices	
2016	Call of Duty: Infinite Warfare	Tee, additional voices	
2018	Battlefield 5	George Mason	
TBA	Squadron 42	Vat Tagaca	In production

== Awards and nominations ==
Year	Award	Category	Work	Result	Ref.
2016	Marbella International Film Festival	Best Actor	London Heist	Won	
2018	4th National Film Awards UK	Best Actor	Rise of the Footsoldier 3: The Pat Tate Story	Won	
2022	8th National Film Awards UK	Best Actor	A Violent Man	Won	
