= James Cosmo =

Scottish actor (born 1947)

James Cosmo MBE
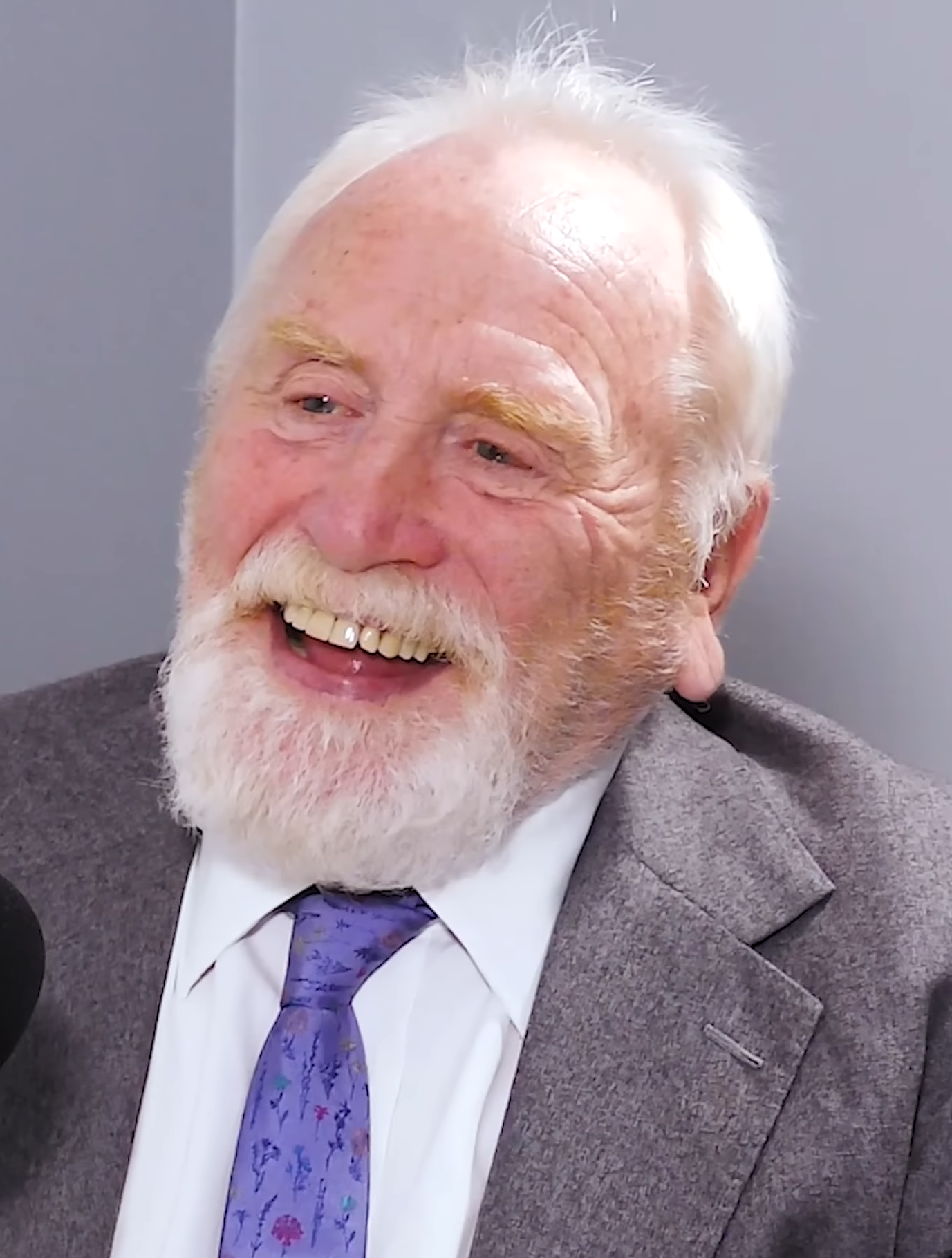
- Cosmo in 2023
- Born: James Ronald Gordon Copeland; 1947 (age 78–79); Dumbarton, Dunbartonshire, Scotland
- Years active: 1965–present
- Spouse: Annie Harris (m. 2000)
- Children: 2

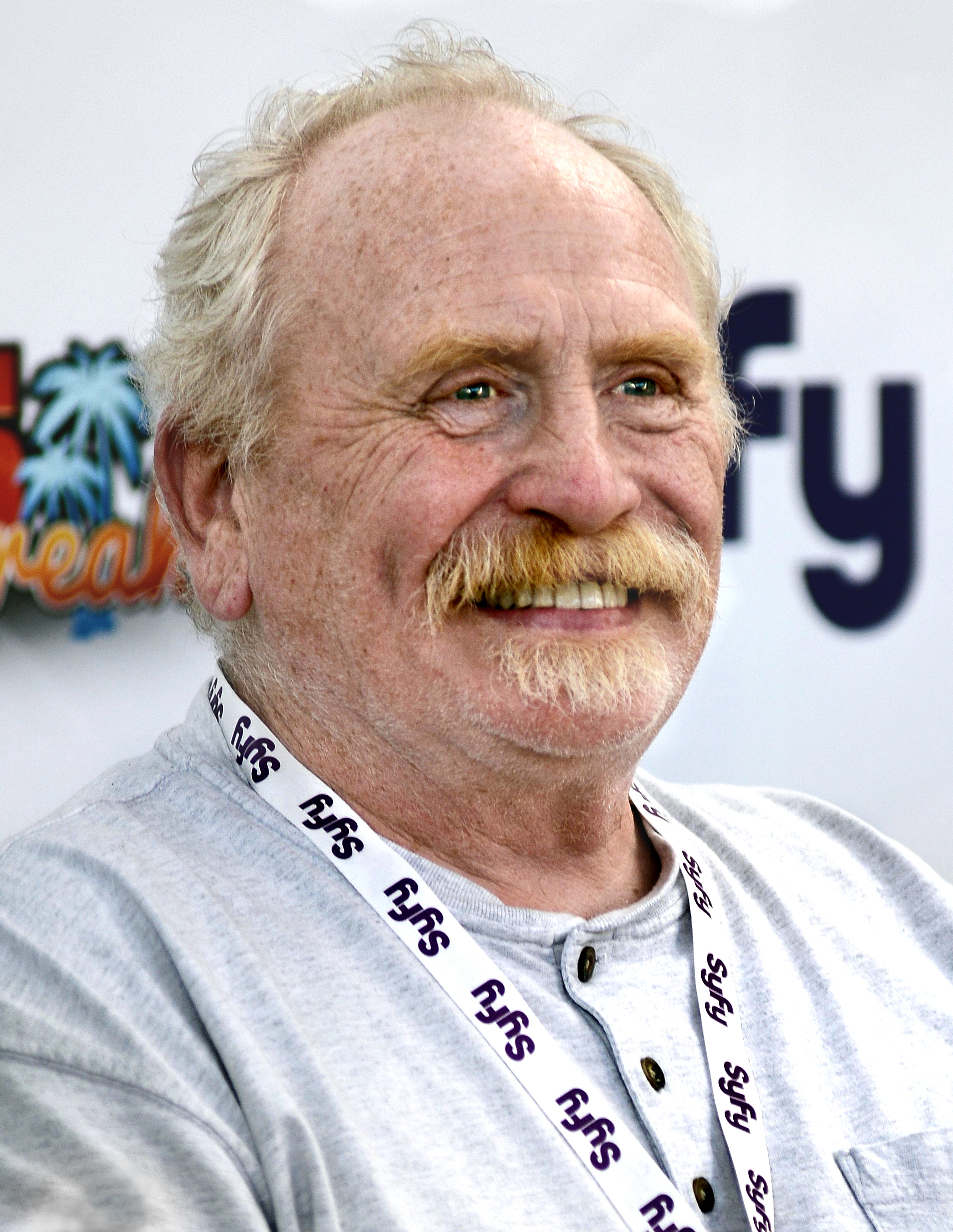
Cosmo in 2014

James Ronald Gordon Copeland (born 1947), known professionally as James Cosmo, is a Scottish actor. Known for his character work, he has played supporting roles in films such as Highlander (1986), Braveheart (1995), Trainspotting (1996), Troy (2004), The Chronicles of Narnia: The Lion, the Witch and the Wardrobe (2005), Ben-Hur (2016), and Wonder Woman (2017). On television, he appeared as Father Kellan Ashby on the third season of Sons of Anarchy (2010), Jeor Mormont on HBO's Game of Thrones (2011–2013), Farder Coram in the BBC series His Dark Materials (2019), Luka Gocharov on the third season of Amazon Prime's Jack Ryan (2022) and Fraser Warren on the first season of Nightsleeper. Cosmo appeared as a contestant on the nineteenth series of Celebrity Big Brother in 2017, finishing in fourth place.

== Early life ==
Cosmo is the son of actor James Copeland and Helen Goodlet Findlay. He attended Hartfield Primary School in Dumbarton. Through his father, young James played cricket on Hampstead Heath with Sean Connery while his father was in the pub with Peter O'Toole. He has a sister. When he was 11, he moved back to Glasgow and later he worked for a time at Arnott Young shipbreakers in Dalmuir.

== Career ==
At the start of his career he adopted Cosmo, the middle name of his mother Helen, as his stage surname. Cosmo is best known for his film roles as Angus MacLeod in Highlander, Campbell in Braveheart and as Father Christmas in the adaptation of The Chronicles of Narnia: The Lion, the Witch and the Wardrobe. Over the years he has also had roles in other films such as Trainspotting, The Last Legion and 2081. He appeared in Troy with future Game of Thrones cast members Sean Bean and Julian Glover. He also appeared in UFO as SHADO operative Lieutenant Anderson, in Take the High Road as Alex Geddes from 1982 until 1983 and in 1984 played Jock McLeish in the Minder episode Senior Citizen Caine. He appeared as Lieutenant-Colonel Philip Drysdale in the seventh series of Soldier Soldier.

From 2011–2013, Cosmo portrayed Jeor Mormont, Lord Commander of the Night's Watch, and father of Jorah Mormont (played by Iain Glen), in the HBO series Game of Thrones. He was involved in the filming of the thriller Breakdown in which he appeared alongside Craig Fairbrass, Bruce Payne, Emmett Scanlan, Olivia Grant and Tamer Hassan. He played the antagonist in the Indian film, Jagame Thandhiram, which released in 2021. He played a Russian intelligence officer named Luka Gocharov in season 3 of the Amazon show Jack Ryan.

He is a patron of the charity Chance for Childhood.

== Filmography ==
=== Film ===
Year	Title	Role	Notes
1969	Battle of Britain	Jamie	
1969	The Virgin Soldiers	Waller	
1971	Assault	Det. Sgt. Beale	
1972	Doomwatch	Bob Gillette	
1972	Young Winston	Officer on Train	
1982	Living Apart Together	Priest	
1986	Highlander	Angus MacLeod	
1988	Stormy Monday	Tony	
1990	The Fool	Mr. Bowring	
1995	Braveheart	Campbell	
1995	The Key	Gangster	Short film
1996	Trainspotting	David Renton	
1996	Emma	Mr. Weston	
1997	Santa/Claws	Santa Claus	Short film
1998	Urban Ghost Story	Minister	
1998	Babe: Pig in the City	Thelonius (voice)	
1999	Sunset Heights	MacDonald	
1999	The Match	Billy Bailey	
1999	Billy and Zorba	Zorba	Short film
1999	One More Kiss	Frank	
2000	Honest	Tommy Chase	
2000	Reflections Upon the Origin of the Pineapple	Narrator (voice)	Short film
2001	To End All Wars	Lt. Col. Stuart McLean	
2001	All the Queen's Men	Archie	
2002	Once Upon a Time in the Midlands	Billy	
2002	The Four Feathers	Col. Sutch	
2003	Skagerrak	Robert	
2003	Man Dancin'	Donnie McGlone	
2003	The Reckoning	Lambert	
2003	Solid Air	Finn	
2004	One Last Chance	Big John	
2004	Troy	Glaucus	
2005	The Adventures of Greyfriars Bobby	James Brown	
2005	The Chronicles of Narnia: The Lion, the Witch and the Wardrobe	Father Christmas	
2006	Half Light	Finlay Murray	
2006	Free Jimmy	HudMaSpecs (voice)	AKA Slipp Jimmy fri (Original title)
2006	The Lives of the Saints	Mr. Karva	
2007	The Last Legion	Hrothgar	
2007	The Seeker: The Dark Is Rising	Dawson	
2007	Where Have I Been All Your Life?	John	Short film
2009	2081	George Bergeron	Short film
2009	The Clan	Hector McKinley	
2010	Outcast	Laird	
2010	Donkeys	Alfie	
2010	The Runway	Sutherland	
2011	No Saints for Sinners	Murphy	
2011	The Glass Man	Pecco	
2012	Citadel	Priest	
2012	Songs for Amy	Murdo	
2013	Get Lucky	Mr. Zigic	
2013	The Golden Scallop	Judge Wellington	
2013	Hammer of the Gods	King Bagsecg	
2013	Justin and the Knights of Valour	Blucher (voice)	
2013	The Christmas Candle	Herbert Hopewell	
2013	Sea Out	Old Joe	Short film
2013	Dying Light	Policeman	
2014	The Boogeyman	Dr. Harper	Short film
2014	We Still Kill the Old Way	Arthur	
2014	Hole	Cooper	Short film
2015	Moonwalkers	Dawson	
2015	Carried	Henry Hunter	Short film
2015	The Legend of Barney Thomson	James Henderson	
2015	The Pyramid Texts	Ray	
2015	January	Albert	AKA Estranged (Original title)
2016	Project 12: The Bunker	Brian Balanowsky	
2016	Breakdown	Albert Chapman	
2016	Mikelis	Mikelis	Short film
2016	Dark Signal	Alan	
2016	Ben-Hur	Quintus	
2016	Whisky Galore!	MacAlister, the Minister	
2016	Monochrome	Roger Daniels	
2016	Eliminators	Cooper	
2017	London Heist	Ray Dixon	
2017	T2 Trainspotting	David Renton	
2017	Last Respects	Philip Drummond (voice)	Short film
2017	Wonder Woman	Field Marshal Haig	
2018	Rogue Trooper: The Quartz Massacre	Narrator (voice)	Short film
2018	In Darkness	Niall	
2018	Outlaw King	Robert Bruce Senior	
2018	Ashes in the Snow	Mr. Stakas	
2018	Malevolent	Grandpa Sayers	
2018	Tomorrow	Mr. Charles	
2019	The Hole in the Ground	Des Brady	
2019	Forget Me Not	Benedict	Short film
2019	Get Duked!	Farmer	
2019	Off Grid	John Tanner	Short film
2019	Shadow Boxer	Eddie Royce	Short film
2020	Skylines	Grant	
2021	Jagame Thanthiram	Peter Sprott	Tamil film
2021	The Kindred	Frank Menzies	
2022	Breath	Nick	
2022	My Sailor, My Love	Howard	
2022	Scrooge: A Christmas Carol	Mr. Fezziwig (voice)	
2023	The Three Musketeers	Cardinal Richelieu	
2024	Can You Hear Me?	Johnny	
2024	The Beast Within	Waylon	
2024	The Last Redemption	Lord Goran	
2025	Salvable	Welly	
2025	The Morrigan	Francis Crowley	
2026	Storm Rider: Legend of Hammerhead	Dida	
2026	Preschool	Joe	
2026	Voidance	Agent Polo	

=== Television ===
Year	Title	Role	Notes
1965	Dr. Finlay's Casebook	Peter Randall	Episode: "The Vision"
1966	Ransom for a Pretty Girl	Charlie Milne	Mini series, 6 episodes
1966	This Man Craig	Douglas McGrath	Episode: "Nurinder"
1967	St. Ives	Dalmahoy	2 episodes
1967	The Revenue Men	Andrew	Episode: "A Pretty Flat Kind of Existence"
1968	Detective	Det. Sgt. MacGregor	Episode: "Dover and the Deadly Poison Pen Letters"
1968	Splash O.K.	Hamish MacPherson	Television film
1969	Dr. Finlay's Casebook	Private Davidson	Episode: "Single or Return"
1969	Softly Softly	McBride	Episode: "In at the Death"
1970	The Borderers	Hector	Episode: "A Woman or an Epitaph"
1970	The Wednesday Play	Senior Under Officer Patterson	Episode: "Sovereign's Company"
1971	Long Voyage Out of War	Thorpe	Episode: "Battle at Tematangi"
1971	UFO	Lt. Anderson	Episode: "Reflections in the Water"
1971	The Persuaders!	Inspector Williams	Episode: "Element of Risk"
1971	The View from Daniel Pike	Det. Con. Sanderson	Episode: "A Tale of Two Cities"
1972	Sutherland's Law	Ian Campbell	Television film
1972	The Stone Tape	Cliff Dow	Television film
1973	ITV Playhouse	Sgt. Robbins	Episode: "Professional"
1973	Sutherland's Law	Ian Campbell	Episode: "The Sea"
1973–1977	Warship	Leading Regulator ("Sheriff") Pat Fuller	21 episodes
1974	Play for Today	Loch	Episode: "The Cheviot, the Stag and the Black, Black Oil"
1975	Churchill's People	Robert Bruce	Episode: "The Wallace"
1975	Quiller	Hamilton	Episode: "Target North"
1976	Survivors	Lenny Carter	Episode: "The Chosen"
1976	Orde Wingate	Brigadier Calvert	3 episodes
1977	George & Mildred	Keith	Episode: "The Dorothy Letters"
1977	The Mackenzie Affair	James Mackenzie	Mini series, 5 episodes
1977–1978	Midnight Is a Place	Davey Scatcherd	3 episodes
1978	The Standard	Harry Bray	Episode: "New Standards"
1978	The Sweeney	Det. Sgt. Davy Freeth	Episode: "Hard Men"
1978	Kidnapped	Beggar	Mini series, episode: "Uncle Ebenezer"
1979	Dick Barton: Special Agent	Jock Anderson	29 episodes
1979	Thundercloud	CPO Hawkins	13 episodes
1979	The Onedin Line	Glasgow McDade	Episode: "To Honour and Obey"
1979	The Professionals	Glover	Episode: "Runner"
1980	Hammer House of Horror	Willis	Episode: "The Thirteenth Reunion"
1981	The Nightmare Man	Sergeant Carch	4 episodes
1981	The House on the Hill	Bonfield	Episode: "Semper Fidelis"
1981	Strangers	Det. Sgt. Galbraith	Episode: "A Dear Green Place"
1982	King's Royal	Colin Lindsay	4 episodes
1982–1984	Take the High Road	Alex Geddes	42 episodes
1984	Minder	Jock McLeish	Episode: "Senior Citizen Caine"
1984	Murder Not Proven?	Sergeant Munro	Episode: "Death on the Mountain"
1984	Scarecrow and Mrs. King	Dr. Ian McCarran	Episode: "The Legend of Das Geisterschloss"
1984	Fairly Secret Army	Crazy Colin Carstairs	2 episodes: "Romance Plughole" and "The Pulses Quicken"
1984	The Master of Ballantrae	Horseman (uncredited)	Television film
1985	Lytton's Diary	Harry Owen	Episode: "Daddy's Girls"
1985	Big Deal	McFee	Episode: "Down and Under"
1985	Operation Julie	Longfellow	Television film
1985-1986	C.A.T.S. Eyes	McNeill / Howard	2 episodes
1986	Running Scared	Detective Inspector McNeill	6 episodes
1986	Lost Empires	Inspector Furness	Mini series, episode: "#1.6"
1987	Super Gran	Mr. McBigg	Episode: "Supergran Snookered"
1987	Brond	Primo	3 episodes
1988	Codename: Kyril	Bonham	Mini series, episode: "#1.1"
1988	Taggart	Victor Baird	Episodes: "Dead Giveaway"
1989	William Tell	Anton	AKA Crossbow (Original title). Episode: "Silver Rider"
1989	Winners and Losers	Frank Kerr	Mini series, 3 episodes
1989	The Justice Game	Glen	4 episodes
1989	Saracen	Miekera	Episode: "Into Africa"
1989	Casualty	John Breckman	Episode: "A Grand in the Hand"
1989	The Bill	D.C.I. Cameron	Episode: "Seen to Be Done"
1989	The Nightwatch	James Smithson	Television film
1990	The Campbells	Sgt. Henderson	Episode: "Old Ways and New"
1990	El C.I.D.	Sands	Episode: "Getting Even"
1990	Treasure Island	Redruth	Television film
1991	The Sharp End	Carmichael	Mini series, 8 episodes
1991	Stay Lucky	Bigmac	Episode: "Hard Times, Hard Men"
1992	Screaming		
1992	Medics	Harry Liverege	Episode: "#2.4"
1992	Heartbeat	Matthew Chapman	Episode: "Nowt But a Prank"
1992	Rab C. Nesbitt	Teacher	Episode: "Lesson"
1993	Scene	Reception Officer	Episode: "Pig Boy"
1993	Between the Lines	D.C.C. Birman	Episode: "Manoeuvre 11"
1993	Casualty	Tony	Episode: "Cat in Hell"
1994	The House of Eliott	James Maxton	Episode: "#3.5"
1994	Alleyn Mysteries	Major Keith Ballantyne	Episode: "Dead Water"
1994	Screen Two	Jerry	Episode: "Sin Bin"
1994–1995	Roughnecks	Tom	13 episodes
1996	Bad Boys	Tam Devlin	Episode: "Dead Men Don't Wear Bunnets"
1997	Ivanhoe	Cedric	Mini series, 5 episodes
1997	Ain't Misbehavin'	Malky Fraser	Mini series, 3 episodes
1997	Soldier Soldier	Lt. Col. Philip Drysdale	9 episodes
1998	Two Lives	Eddie	Episode: "Golden Wedding"
1999	Cleopatra	Agrippa	Mini series, 2 episodes: "Parts 1 & 2"
1999	Comedy Lab	David (voice)	Episode: "Heart and Sole"
1999	The Bill	Patrick Grainger: Lennox's Story	Episode: "Haunted"
1999	Split Second	Donald Paterson	Television film
2000	The 10th Kingdom	Blind Woodsman	Mini series, 2 episodes: "#1.4" and "#1.10"
2000	Tales from the Madhouse	The Centurion	Mini series, episode: "The Centurion"
2000	Badger	Charlie Maddox	Episode: "Predators"
2000	The Last of the Blonde Bombshells	McNab	Television film
2000–2001	Rebus	Morris Gerald Cafferty	2 episodes
2001	Best of Both Worlds	William Landucci	
2004	Biography	Narrator (voice)	Documentary series, episode: "Tchaikovsky"
2005	Little House on the Prairie	Mr. Scott	Mini series, 4 episodes
2007	Midsomer Murders	Jack 'Axeman' McKinley	Episode: "The Axeman Cometh"
2007	Impact Earth	Brenden Kelly	Television film
2008	The Colour of Magic	Galder Weatherwax	Mini series, episode: "Part 1: The Colour of Magic"
2009	Merlin	Hengist	Episode: "Lancelot and Guinevere"
2009	The Narnia Code	Narrator	Television film
2010	Castle	Finn Rourke	Episode: "Sucker Punch"
2010	FlashForward	Philip	Episode: "Revelation Zero: Part 2"
2010	Sons of Anarchy	Father Kellan Ashby	8 episodes
2010	One Night in Emergency		Television film
2010	The Santa Incident	Nick	Television film
2011–2013	Game of Thrones	Jeor Mormont	12 episodes
2012	Silent Witness	Arnold Mears	Episode: "Paradise Lost"
2013	Death in Paradise	Roger Seymour	Episode: "Murder on the Plantation"
2013	Case Histories	Len Lomax	Episode: "Started Early, Took My Dog"
2014	New Worlds	Goffe	Mini series, episode: "#1.1"
2015	Magnum Opus	Moshe Navon	Episode: "Fuck Da Babylon" (Pilot)
2016	Shetland	Arthur McCall	4 episodes
2016	Stag	The Gamekeeper	Mini series, episodes 1 & 2
2016	The Collection	Jules Trouvier	4 episodes
2016, 2018–2019	The Durrells	Captain Creech	4 episodes
2017	Celebrity Big Brother	Himself	Series 19 finalist and third runner-up, 19 episodes
2017	SS-GB	Harry Woods	Mini series, 5 episodes
2018	Mystery of the Lost Paintings	Narrator (voice)	Documentary series, 8 episodes
2018–2019	Hold the Sunset	Bob	9 episodes
2019	The Name of the Rose	Jorge da Burgos	8 episodes
2019	Chernobyl	Miner	Episode: 'Open Wide, O Earth'
2019	His Dark Materials	Farder Coram	6 episodes
2021	The Bay	Bill Bradwell	6 episodes
2022	Tom Clancy's Jack Ryan	Luka Gocharov	8 episodes
2023–2025	Highland Cops	Narrator (voice)	Documentary series, 18 episodes (3 Series)
2023–2025	Six Four	Jim Mackie	Mini series, 4 episodes
2024	Nightsleeper	Fraser Warren	6 episodes
2025	Fear	Allan Berwick	2 episodes
2025	Karen Pirie	Brodie Grant Snr	3 episodes
2025	Hostage	Max Dalton	3 episodes
2025	Talamasca	Director Houseman	1 episode
