= Fall (2022 film) =

Survival thriller film by Scott Mann

- Theatrical release poster
- Directed by: Scott Mann
- Written by: Scott Mann; Jonathan Frank
- Produced by: Christian Mercuri; James Harris; Mark Lane; Scott Mann; David Haring
- Starring: Grace Caroline Currey; Virginia Gardner; Mason Gooding; Jeffrey Dean Morgan
- Cinematography: Miguel "MacGregor" Olaso
- Edited by: Rob Hall
- Music by: Tim Despic
- Production companies: Capstone Pictures; BuzzFeed Studios; Tea Shop Productions; Flawless Productions Inc.
- Distributed by: Lionsgate (United States); Signature Entertainment (United Kingdom)
- Release date: August 12, 2022 (United States)
- Running time: 107 minutes
- Countries: United States; United Kingdom
- Language: English
- Budget: $3 million
- Box office: $21.8 million

Fall is a 2022 survival psychological thriller film directed by Scott Mann and written by Mann and Jonathan Frank. Starring Grace Caroline Currey, Virginia Gardner, Mason Gooding and Jeffrey Dean Morgan, the film follows two best friends who climb a 2,000-foot-tall (610 m) television broadcasting mast, before becoming stranded at the top.

It was theatrically released in the United States on August 12, 2022, by Lionsgate Films. The film was a box office success, grossing $21 million worldwide against a $3 million budget, and received generally positive reviews from critics; Currey's and Gardner's performances were particularly praised, with criticism for its visual effects and screenplay. A sequel, Fall 2: Deadpoint, was released on September 2, 2026.

== Plot ==
Best friends Becky Connor and Shiloh Hunter are climbing a mountain with Becky's husband, Dan, who is startled by a bat and falls to his death.

A year later, Becky has given up climbing and become a recluse, contemplating suicide. She has estranged herself from her father, James, because he thinks Dan would not have grieved as she has if the situation were reversed. Just before the anniversary of Dan's death, Shiloh invites Becky to climb the decommissioned 2,000-foot (610 m) B-67 TV Tower in the desert, before it is demolished. Shiloh suggests she scatter Dan's ashes from the top, as a form of healing. A reluctant Becky accepts, hoping to finally move on from Dan's death.

The next day, Shiloh and Becky arrive and climb several severely corroded ladders to a tiny platform at the top of the tower, where Shiloh goads Becky into momentarily free-hanging off the platform, while Shiloh records for her YouTube channel. Becky scatters Dan's ashes. As the two begin their descent, the ladder breaks. Becky falls but is caught by a rope connecting her to Shiloh. Shiloh pulls Becky back up and they realize they are now stranded hundreds of feet above the next intact ladder. Becky's thigh has also been cut. Their backpack with their water and a small quadcopter drone falls onto a communications dish below them.

Despite the remote location, Shiloh is confident that someone heard the crash of the ladder; however, help does not arrive. They try to use their cell phones, but radio interference from the communications dish blocks the signal. Shiloh sends a message for help to her Instagram followers by packing her phone in a shoe and dropping it outside the range of the interference.

The pair notice a man and his dog, but cannot get his attention. The man joins another man camping in an RV nearby. They wait until night, and use a flare gun found in an emergency box on the platform to alert the men. The men see the flare, but instead of helping, steal Shiloh's car and drive off. The pair realize Shiloh's phone, dropped in the shoe, must have been smashed, as still no help has come.

Becky notices a tattoo on Shiloh's ankle: "1-4-3," a code Dan used to say "I love you" to Becky. Shiloh tearfully admits to a four-month affair that ended before Becky and Dan's wedding. The next day, Shiloh climbs down, using the rope to retrieve the backpack with water, but nearly falls. She injures her hands, but successfully ties the rope to the bag, and Becky uses all of her strength to pull her up, along with the backpack.

Becky has a nightmare of a vulture eating Shiloh's dead body. She uses power from the tower's aviation obstruction lighting warning light to charge the drone, whilst being attacked by a vulture, and sends the drone to a nearby motel with a written message for help, but the drone is struck by a truck and destroyed.

Becky is delirious from dehydration, but in a brief lucid moment, she realizes Shiloh actually fell onto one of the communication dishes when retrieving the backpack, and died; Becky has been hallucinating her presence since then.

The next day, Becky is awakened by a vulture gnawing at her wounded leg; she kills the vulture and eats it. Her strength partially restored, she abseils down to the dish where Shiloh's body lies. Becky types a text message to her father on her phone, then puts it in Shiloh's shoe and shoves it into Shiloh's body before pushing the body off the tower. Shiloh's body cushions the impact and the message transmits. James alerts emergency services, who then rush to the tower. Becky and James reunite and reconcile.

== Cast ==
- Grace Caroline Currey as Becky Connor
- Virginia Gardner as Shiloh Hunter
- Mason Gooding as Dan Connor, Becky's deceased husband
- Jeffrey Dean Morgan as James Conner, Becky's father
- Julia Pace Mitchell as Diner Server (credited as Julia Mitchell)
- Jasper Cole as Steve (RV man with dog)

== Production ==
=== Filming ===
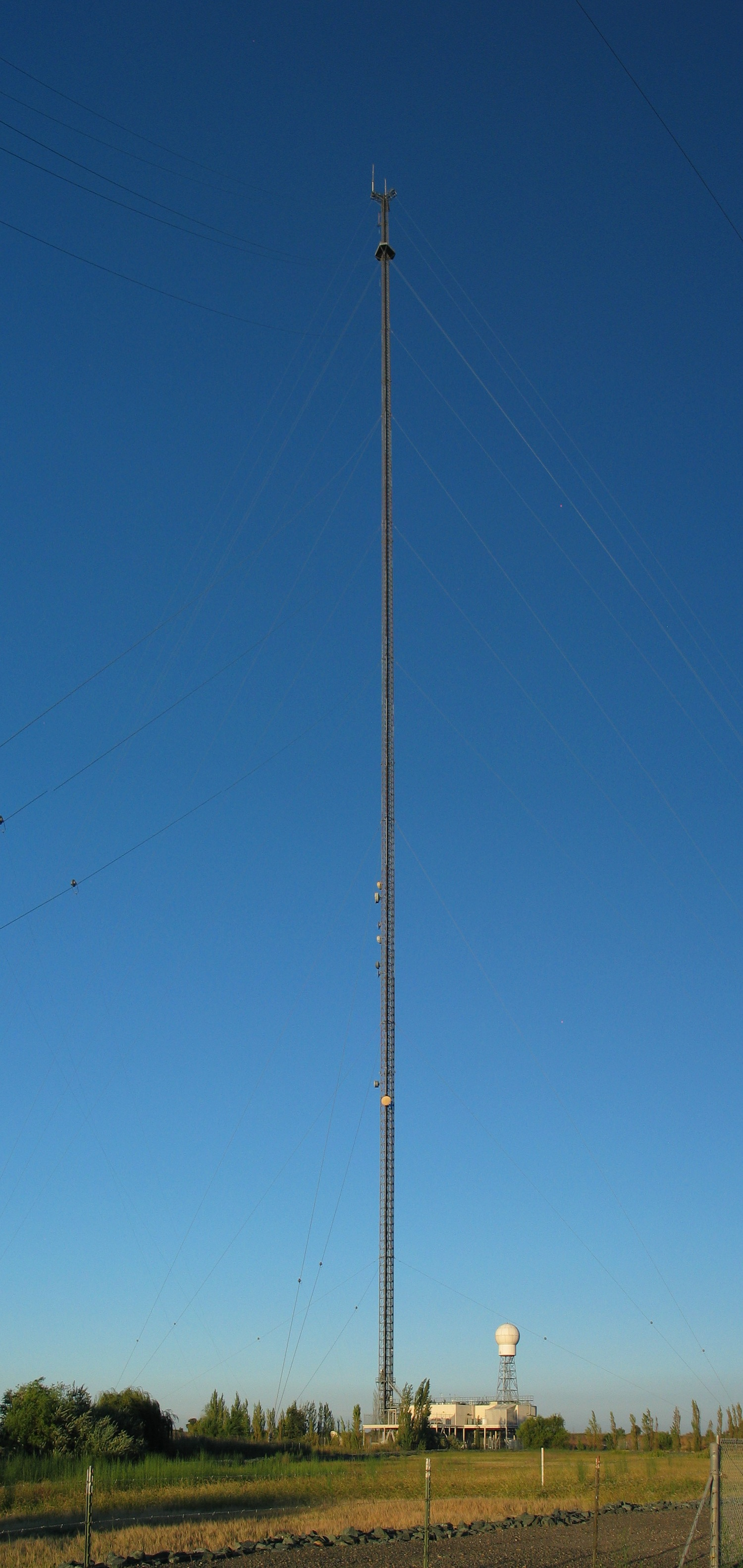
The KXTV/KOVR tower in California inspired the look of the radio tower in the film.

Originally the film was intended as a short. According to director Scott Mann, the idea came to him while he was shooting Final Score at a stadium in the UK: "We were filming at height, and off camera we got into this interesting conversation about height and the fear of falling and how that's inside of all of us, really, and how that can be a great device for a movie." Fall was "Filmed For IMAX" using the ARRI ALEXA LF camera in the Shadow Mountains of California's Mojave Desert. The look of the fictitious B67 tower in the film was inspired by the real KXTV/KOVR tower, a radio tower in Walnut Grove, California, which is 2,049 feet (625 m) high and one of the tallest structures in the world.

According to director Scott Mann, the filmmakers considered green screen or digital sets, but ultimately opted for the real thing. They decided to build the upper portion of the tower on top of a mountain so that the actors would appear to be thousands of feet in the air, even though in real life they were never more than a hundred feet off the ground. Currey and Gardner were offered stunt doubles, but they opted to perform their own stunts. Filming was difficult, because often weather such as lightning and strong winds posed a challenge. The film cost $3 million to produce.

=== Post-production ===
Although the film was produced by Tea Shop Productions and Capstone Pictures, once production finished, Lionsgate Films acquired the film's distribution rights without a minimum guarantee for the producers. After it did well in test screenings, Lionsgate decided to release it in theaters. They ordered the creators to change or remove over 30 uses of the word "fuck" from the film so it could earn a PG-13 rating from the Motion Picture Association instead of a likely R rating, to increase profitability.

As reshooting the scenes would have been time-consuming and expensive, they turned to Flawless, a company established in 2021 by Nick Lynes and Fall director Scott Mann, to deepfake the actor's faces and artificially redub instances of "fuck" to PG-13-acceptable epithets such as "freaking". The first project to use Flawless, Fall after editing received the PG-13 rating. According to Mann, "neural reshoots" were completed within two weeks during the final stages of post-production. This method was also applied to foreign language dubbing for overseas distribution including Spanish and Japanese.

== Release ==
The film was released in theaters in the United States on August 12, 2022, by Lionsgate, who spent $4 million releasing and promoting the film.

It was released online on September 27, 2022, followed by Blu-ray and DVD releases on October 18, 2022.

== Reception ==
=== Box office ===
Fall grossed $7.2 million in the United States and Canada, and $14.6 million in other territories, for worldwide total of $21.8 million, against its $3 million budget.

In the United States and Canada, Fall was released alongside Mack & Rita and the wide expansion of Bodies Bodies Bodies, and projected to gross $1–2 million from 1,548 theaters on its opening weekend. It made $923,000 on its first day, and went on to debut to $2.5 million. While finishing 10th at the box office, it was the highest-earning new release for the week.

=== Critical response ===
On the review aggregator website Rotten Tomatoes, 80% of 153 critics' reviews are positive, with an average rating of 6.4/10. The website's consensus reads: "Fundamentally absurd yet as evocatively minimalist as its title, Fall is a sustained adrenaline rush for viewers willing to suspend disbelief." Metacritic, which uses a weighted average, assigned the film a score of 62 out of 100, based on 23 critics, indicating "generally favorable" reviews. Audiences surveyed by CinemaScore gave the film an average grade of "B" on an A+ to F scale, while those at PostTrak gave it an overall 69% positive score, with 44% saying they would definitely recommend it.

== Future ==
Following the film's growing popularity after its release on Netflix, a sequel was announced to be in development in March 2023. By October 2023, it was reported that two sequels were concurrently in development, with studios aiming to expand Fall into a franchise. Scott Mann was confirmed to serve as a producer on both films, in addition to co-writing and directing the third installment. The sequels are expected to feature returning characters from the original film alongside a new supporting cast.

Production will be a joint venture between Tea Shop Productions, Flawless Productions Inc., and Capstone Pictures, with Mark Lane, James Harris, Christian Mercuri, and David Haring also attached as producers. Principal photography on the second film began in June 2024.

In May 2024, Peter and Michael Spierig were announced as co-directors of the sequel, working from a script co-written by Mann and Jonathan Frank. Mann is set to write and direct the third film following completion of the second installment. In September 2025, Harriet Slater, Arsema Thomas, and Tom Brittney were announced as the main cast.
