= MacGregor (filmmaker) =

American film director

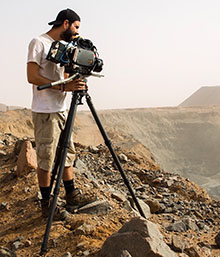
- Born: Miguel de Olaso
- Known for: A thousand suns, Kandahar, Fall, Los Angeles 1991, SIMILO, The Mauritania Railway: Backbone of the Sahara

Miguel de Olaso (born 1980), known professionally as MacGregor, is a Spanish cinematographer and film director based in Los Angeles.

== Biography ==
MacGregor, a Spanish-born cinematographer based in Los Angeles, CA, is known for films such as Fall (2022) and Kandahar (2023) and for his work on documentaries such as The Mauritania Railway: Backbone of the Sahara.

== Filmography ==
Film

Year	Title	Director
2019	Vivarium	Lorcan Finnegan
2022	Fall	Scott Mann
2023	Kandahar	Ric Roman Waugh

Television

Year	Title	Director	DoP	Notes
2018	Future Sex	Yes	Yes	3 episodes
2020	One Minute Worlds	Yes	Yes	Also series creator, writer, producer and editor
2023-2024	A Thousand Suns	Yes	Yes	Also series creator, writer, producer and editor

Short film

Year	Title	Director	Writer	Producer	DoP	Editor	Notes
2004	Bloody Tango	No	No	No	Yes	Yes	
2006	Sin Pa	No	No	No	No	Yes	
2006	Smile	No	No	No	Yes	No	
2008	A Little Mouth to Feed	No	No	No	Yes	No	
2008	18 Seconds	Yes	No	No	Yes	Yes	Credited as "Miguel López Ximénez"
2008	Unawakening	No	No	No	Yes	No	
2009	The Moment After	No	No	No	Yes	Yes	
2009	Together	No	No	No	Yes	No	
2009	Buen viaje	No	No	No	Yes	No	
2010	Uyuni	Yes	Yes	No	Yes	Yes	
2011	BlinkyTM	No	No	No	Yes	No	Credited as "Miguel 'MacGregor' De Olaso"
2011	Foxes	No	No	No	Yes	No	
2014	Similo	Yes	Yes	Yes	Yes	No	Co-directed with Bruno Zacarías
2015	Los Angeles 1991	Yes	Yes	Yes	Yes	Yes	
2016	Snake Bite	No	No	Yes	Yes	No	
2017	Pvris: What's Wrong	No	No	No	Yes	No	
2017	The Mauritania Railway: Backbone of the Sahara	Yes	Yes	Yes	Yes	Yes	Documentary short
2018	Jeep: Legacy	No	No	No	Yes	No	
2019	Corporate Monster	No	No	No	Yes	No	

== Awards ==
Year	Title	Award
2008	18 Seconds	Best Cinematography INTERNATIONAL FILM FESTIVAL ALICANTE 2009 (Spain); Best Cinematography AGUILAR DE CAMPOO INTERNATIONAL SHORT FILM FESTIVAL 2008 (Spain); Best Cinematography ZINEXIN DE LA RODA 2008 (Spain); Best Cinematography FESTIVAL DE LA FILA DE VALLADOLID 2008 (Spain); Best Cinematography EL SECTOR DIGITAL FILM FESTIVAL 2008 (Spain)
2010	Uyuni	Platinum Remi Award WORLDFEST - HOUSTON INTERNATIONAL FILM & VIDEO FESTIVAL (United States); 2nd Prize Best Cinematography CONCURSO DE CORTOS CUADRILLA DE LAGUARDIA - RIOJA ALAVESA (Spain)
2011	BlinkyTM	Best Narrative Short Vimeo Awards 2012 (USA)
2014	SIMILO	Best Short Film VOGHERA FILM FESTIVAL (Italy); Best Spanish Sci-fi Film THE PHILIP K. DICK INTERNATIONAL FILM FESTIVAL OF SCIENCIE FICTION, FANTASTIC FILM, SCIENCE AND THE SUPERNATURAL (United States); Best Foreign Film FESTIVAL OF SERBIAN FANTASTIC FILM (FSFF) (Serbia); Best Cinematography FESTIVAL DE CINE DE MADRID FCM-PNR (Spain)
2015	Los Angeles 1991	Best Short Film FESTIVAL INTERNACIONAL DE CINE EN GUADALAJARA (Mexico); Best Short Film 1st Prize RIVERSIDE SHORT FILM AND VIDEO FESTIVAL (United States); Best Short Film GINES EN CORTO (Spain); Best Screenplay & Best Editing FESTIVAL DE CORTOMETRAJES DE AGUILAR DE CAMPOO (Spain); Best Short Film DAKINO INTERNATIONAL FILM FESTIVAL (Romania); Best Cinematography FESTIVAL EUROPEO DE CORTOMETRAJES VILLAMAYOR DE CINE (Spain); Best Cinematography REVOLUTION ME FILM FESTIVAL (United States)
2017	The Mauritania Railway: Backbone of the Sahara	Best Short Film FESTIMATGE - FESTIVAL DE LA IMATGE DE CALELLA (Spain); Best Documentary Short Film - EUGANEA FILM FESTIVAL (Italy); Short Documentary Best Cinematography and Stylistic Achievement Jury Prize SOCIAL IMPACT MEDIA AWARDS (United States); Best Cinematography CERTAMEN INTERNACIONAL DE CORTOMETRAJES ALMERÍA EN CORTO (Spain); Best Cinematography REQUENA Y... ¡ACCIÓN! (Spain)
