= Grace Caroline Currey =

American actress (born 1996)

- Currey in 2026
- Born: Grace Caroline Fulton; 17 July 1996 (age 30)
- Occupations: Actress; dancer
- Years active: 2001–present
- Spouse: Branden John Currey (m. 2021)

Grace Caroline Currey (née Fulton; born 17 July 1996) is an American actress and dancer. She is best known for playing Mary Bromfield in the DC Extended Universe films Shazam! (2019) and its sequel Shazam! Fury of the Gods (2023). She starred in The Conjuring Universe film Annabelle: Creation (2017) and the survival thriller film Fall (2022).

== Early life ==
Currey is the daughter of Damian Fulton, an artist, and his wife Alisa. She has three siblings.

== Career ==
Starting as a child actress, her first role was the four-year-old version of Heather Paige Kent's character in a 2001 episode of That's Life. She appeared as Celina Rice in the 2007 film Badland.

Currey also appeared in several episodes of Ghost Whisperer during its run as a young Melinda Gordon.

As an adult, Currey played Carol in the 2017 horror film Annabelle: Creation in her breakout role. She said, "I've never done a horror film before and I've never had to scream like that. The movie is very cool, sort of an homage to 1960s horror films."

Currey reunited with Annabelle: Creation director David F. Sandberg in the DC Extended Universe 2019 film Shazam!, where she portrayed Mary Bromfield. In 2022, she starred in the thriller Fall with Virginia Gardner, and reprised the role of Mary Bromfield in the 2023 sequel Shazam! Fury of the Gods.

== Personal life ==
Currey is married to Branden John Currey. They started dating in 2019 and were engaged two years later. Following her marriage, she changed her surname from Fulton to Currey.

== Filmography ==
=== Film ===
Year	Title	Role	Notes
2007	Badland	Celina Rice	
2007	The Secret of the Magic Gourd	Susie	English dub
2014	Journey to Abaddon	Willow	Short film
2017	Painted Horses	Paige	
2017	Annabelle: Creation	Carol	
2017	Elliott's to Do List	Elliott	Short film
2019	Shazam!	Mary Bromfield	
2020	Vampire Dad	Susie	
2020	Most Guys Are Losers	Sandy	
2021	Hart of the Wild Bunch	Zamora	Short film
2022	Fall	Becky Connor	
2023	Shazam! Fury of the Gods	Mary Bromfield / Super Hero Mary	
2025	A Breed Apart	Violet	
2025	Nadine	Nadine	Short film
2026	The Leader	Michelle	
2026	Fall 2: Deadpoint	Becky Connor	Uncredited cameo
TBA	Untitled sequel to Fall 2: Deadpoint	Becky Connor	

=== Television ===
Year	Title	Role	Notes
2001	That's Life	4-year-old Lydia	Episode: "Banister Head"
2001	JAG	Katelyn Maat	Episode: "Redemption"
2002	Home of the Brave	Sydney Briggs	Television film
2004	The Mystery of Natalie Wood	Young Natalie Wood	Television film
2004	Back When We Were Grownups	Young Biddy	Television film
2005–2007	Ghost Whisperer	Young Melinda Gordon	Recurring role; 5 episodes
2006	Bones	Haley Farre	Episode: "The Girl with the Curl"
2008	Our First Christmas	Lily	Television film
2012–2015	Revenge	Young Victoria Harper	Guest role; 4 episodes
2016	Awkward	Boots	Episode: "Misadventures in Babysitting"

== Awards and nominations ==
Year	Award	Category	Work	Result
2014	Downtown Film Festival Los Angeles	Best Actress in a Short – Festival Award	Journey to Abaddon	Won
2026	Woods Hole Film Festival	Best Ensemble Cast (shared with Tim Blake Nelson, Vera Farmiga, Jim Parsons and Simon Rex)	The Leader	Won
