= Make Me Famous (2020 film) =

2020 television film by Peter King

- Poster
- Created by: Reggie Yates
- Written by: Reggie Yates
- Directed by: Peter King
- Starring: Tom Brittney; Amanda Abbington; Tilly Keeper; Aiysha Hart; Nina Sosanya; Emma Rigby; Trieve Blackwood-Cambridge
- Country of origin: United Kingdom
- Original language: English

Production
- Executive producers: Colin Barr; Sue Horth
- Producer: Margaret Conway
- Camera setup: Multi-camera
- Running time: 60 minutes
- Production company: Expectation Entertainment

Original release
- Network: BBC Three
- Release: 17 June 2020

Make Me Famous is a 2020 British television film that premiered on BBC Three on 17 June 2020. The film was created and written by Reggie Yates, directed by Peter King, and stars an ensemble cast including Tom Brittney, Amanda Abbington, Tilly Keeper, Aiysha Hart, Nina Sosanya and Emma Rigby.

== Plot ==
Billy appears on a constructed reality series titled Love or Lust. When he impresses the producers of the series, he believes his life is set to change forever. A year after the show has been broadcast, many of Billy's co-stars are doing well in their career, but Billy struggles to balance the fame, social media and the assumptions people have made about him, which result in him having self-confidence issues.

== Cast ==
- Tom Brittney as Billy, a former contestant on Love or Lust who wants to break away from his bad image created on the reality series.
- Amanda Abbington as Amanda, Billy's worried mother.
- Emma Rigby as Michelle, a former contestant on Love or Lust who has achieved fame with longevity. She dated Billy on the series.
- Trieve Blackwood-Cambridge as Gary, Billy's manager.
- Nina Sosanya as Stephanie, a producer on Love or Lust. She appears in Billy's flashbacks.
- Aiysha Hart as Kelly, a producer on Love or Lust that Billy flirts with.
- Tilly Keeper as Helen, a business minded contestant on the recent series of Love or Lust.

== Production ==
Make Me Famous was filmed in February 2020. A scene in the film depicts Billy attempting suicide due to online hate, which was filmed a day before the death of Love Island presenter Caroline Flack, who committed suicide for the same reason. Brittney stated: "We just filmed the suicide scene the day before, and so I'd spent, you know, six hours sat there, letting the character contemplate killing himself, and then the next day, she did the same, and although it was a different scenario, it was still one of those things where it was just like, 'My God'. It was really upsetting." The film and its cast were announced in April 2020.

== Reception ==
Cydney Yeates of Metro commented: "Make Me Famous should be compulsory viewing. For teenagers, for parents, for anyone wanting to break into the world of entertainment and for anyone who uses social media. The show is far from glamorous and, unlike the content we're so used to seeing on Instagram, it's completely unfiltered. This is hugely important as it reinstates the notion that pictures and videos shared on social media are not necessarily a reflection of reality." She also praised the film for touching upon the dark side of fame, and added that it is often undocumented. Louis Chilton of The Independent marked that the acting in the film is "decent", but that the female characters featured in the film are "underwritten and unconvincing". The Radio Times described the scene where Billy tries to kill himself as "a devastating scene". Rupert Hawksley of i newspaper praised Brittany's performance in the film, describing him as "excellent", adding that there was a "fragility beneath the bravado, which Brittney wisely underplayed, as if Billy was trying to suppress something". Samuel Fishwick of Evening Standard wrote: "There were several moments where I was drifting off this largely excellent 60-minute drama, my hand listing towards a social media scrolling binge. How could Billy be relatable? He's a hollow man, a stuffed and puffed man, a big child with not a lot going on in his life beyond club nights and tabloid one-night stands", but noted Yates' writing, describing it as "masterful" and delivering "emotional punches". When the film made its premiere on BBC One, it drew in 840,000 viewers.
