= How Kids Roll =

2024 drama film directed by Loris Lai

- Theatrical release poster
- Italian: I bambini di Gaza – Sulle onde della libertà
- Directed by: Loris Lai
- Written by: Loris Lai; Dahlia Heyman
- Based on: Sulle onde della libertà by Nicoletta Bortolotti
- Produced by: Elda Ferri; Lawrence Bender; Frédéric Ollier; Peter De Maegd; Loris Lai
- Starring: Marwan Hamdan; Mikhael Fridel; Tom Rhys Harries; Lyna Khoudri
- Cinematography: Shane Sigler
- Edited by: Andrea Maguolo
- Music by: Nicola Piovani
- Production companies: Jean Vigo Italia; Eagle Pictures; B-Roll; Panoramic Film; Rai Cinema; Lawrence Bender Productions; Potemkino
- Distributed by: Eagle Pictures (Italy)
- Release date: 28 March 2024 (Italy)
- Countries: Italy; United States; Belgium
- Languages: English; Arabic; Hebrew
- Budget: €2.8 million
- Box office: €126,000

How Kids Roll (Italian: I bambini di Gaza – Sulle onde della libertà, lit. 'The Children of Gaza – On the Waves of Freedom') is a 2024 drama film directed by Loris Lai in his feature directorial debut, from a screenplay he co-wrote with Dahlia Heyman, freely inspired by the 2013 Italian novel Sulle onde della libertà (lit. 'On the Waves of Freedom') by Nicoletta Bortolotti. It tells the story of two boys, one Palestinian and the other Israeli, who form an unlikely friendship due to their mutual love for surfing amidst the war in the Gaza Strip during the Second Intifada in 2003. It stars Marwan Hamdan, Mikhael Fridel, Tom Rhys Harries, and Lyna Khoudri. The film is a co-production between Italy, United States and Belgium.

The film was released theatrically in Italy by Eagle Pictures on 28 March 2024.

== Plot ==
Gaza Strip, 2003. Two 11-year-old boys, Mahmud and Alon, one Palestinian and the other Israeli, form an unlikely friendship due to their mutual love for surfing amidst the war in Gaza during the Second Intifada.

== Cast ==
- Marwan Hamdan as Mahmud
- Mikhael Fridel as Alon
- Tom Rhys Harries as Dan
- Lyna Khoudri as Farah
- Ruth Rosenfeld as Sara
- Husam Chadat as Ashraf
- Eyad Hourani as Ahmed
- Samuel Kay as Yehuda

== Production ==
=== Development ===
How Kids Roll is the feature directorial debut of Italian-American filmmaker Loris Lai, who co-wrote the screenplay along with Dahlia Heyman, freely inspired by the 2013 Italian novel Sulle onde della libertà by Nicoletta Bortolotti. Lai worked on the project for over a decade. He had the idea for the film during a trip to Gaza while working as a photojournalist for the London Times in 2014. Lai described the film as "a story of peace and hope".

The film's working title was Roll. On 22 March 2021, it was reported that the film was awarded €400,000 in funding from Eurimages. The film is a co-production between Italy's Jean Vigo Italia, Eagle Pictures, B-Roll, Panoramic Film, and Rai Cinema, along with Lawrence Bender Productions from the United States, and Belgium's Potemkino, with the support of Eurimages, Lazio Cinema International Fund, and the Italian Ministry of Culture. It was produced by Elda Ferri, Lawrence Bender, Frédéric Ollier, Peter De Maegd and Loris Lai, with Patric Palm, Cindy Cederlund and Dahlia Heyman serving as executive producers. The score was composed by Oscar winner composer Nicola Piovani.

On 11 November 2022, Variety announced that filming had wrapped in Tunisia and that newcomers Marwan Hamdan and Mikhael Fridel would play the lead roles in the film, while Welsh actor Tom Rhys Harries would play the ex-surfing champion, and that Algerian-French actress Lyna Khoudri would also star in the film. Khoudri was the director's first choice for the film and was involved in the project since 2020.

The two main child actors in the film were not professional actors. Around two thousand children auditioned for the lead roles. Casting took place mainly in occupied territories such as the Golan Heights and the West Bank, mostly in schools.

Lai said it was a challenge to get passports for both the Palestinian and the Israeli cast. After months of waiting, they were able to get the passports for the Palestinian cast after approaching Palestinian President Mahmoud Abbas during his visit to the United Nations in New York. Lai said he also had problems when an Israeli soldier tore up his photo in his Italian passport and said it was no longer valid. An Israeli family also refused to participate in the film.

=== Filming ===
The original plan was to shoot the film in Israel and in Gaza, but shooting in Israel was too expensive and it was not possible to shoot in Gaza, so the crew had to find another location. Lai said that he was suggested to say that the film was about surfing in order to be able to shoot in Tunisia and avoid trouble.

Principal photography took place in Tunisia between September and December 2022. Filming at Tarak Ben Ammar Studios in Tunis wrapped in November 2022. The cast and crew then moved to Cape Verde in search of surfing waves.

Lai said that the relationships between the Palestinians and Israelis on set was not easy, but that the Palestinian and the Israeli child actors who played the lead characters, Marwan Hamdan and Mikhael Fridel, became inseparable friends, but their respective mothers avoided each other.

=== Post-production ===
Post-production was finished in September 2023. Lai said that he did not change anything in the film following the Israeli invasion of the Gaza Strip in October 2023, where over 12,000 Palestinian children have been killed. He also said that if the film had been shot after October 2023, it would have taken a much darker turn, because despite everything, How Kids Roll still has a bit of hope.

== Release ==
The film was released theatrically in Italy by Eagle Pictures on 28 March 2024.

== Reception ==
After watching the film, Pope Francis said in a statement published by Italian news agency Agenzia Nazionale Stampa Associata (ANSA) on 8 March 2024, "This film with the hopeful voices of Palestinian and Israeli children will be a great contribution to education in brotherhood, social friendship and peace."

On 13 September 2024, How Kids Roll was one of the 19 films shortlisted by Italy's Oscar committee to be selected as the country's official submission for the Best International Feature Film category at the 97th Academy Awards.
