= Fall 2: Deadpoint =

- Theatrical release poster
- Directed by: The Spierig Brothers
- Written by: Jonathan Frank; Scott Mann
- Based on: Characters by: Jonathan Frank; Scott Mann
- Produced by: Scott Mann; Christian Mercuri; James Harris; Mark Lane; David Haring
- Starring: Harriet Slater; Arsema Thomas; Tom Brittney; Virginia Gardner
- Cinematography: Andrew Strahorn
- Edited by: Tommy Aagaard; Scott Gray
- Music by: Tim Despic
- Production companies: Tea Shop Productions; Capstone Pictures; Flawless Productions Inc.
- Distributed by: Lionsgate Films; Grindstone Entertainment Group
- Release date: September 2, 2026
- Running time: 97 minutes
- Country: United States
- Language: English
- Budget: $3 million
- Box office: $26.7 million

Fall 2: Deadpoint (titled simply Fall 2 in the United Kingdom) is a 2026 American survival thriller film directed by Peter and Michael Spierig and written by Jonathan Frank and Scott Mann. The sequel to Fall (2022), it stars Harriet Slater, Arsema Thomas, Tom Brittney, and Virginia Gardner.

The film was released in the United States by Lionsgate on September 2, 2026. Unlike its predecessor, the film received mixed reviews from critics, but was a box office success, grossing $26.7 million on a $3 million budget.

== Plot ==
After the death of Shiloh Hunter, (Note: As depicted in Fall (2022)) her grieving sister Jax meets Shiloh's friend Luce to sell Shiloh's recovered truck. Inside, Luce finds Shiloh's scrapbook of locations where she planned to climb and perform stunts for her social media followers. Luce eventually persuades Jax to accompany her to a plank walk on Mount Kwan in Thailand, where a dragon statue is said to "eat your fears." In Thailand, they visit a secluded bar and use a code phrase to meet Jon, a non-native guide who agrees to take them on the plank walk for a fee paid by Luce. Jon warns them that the mountain has been permanently closed because of earthquakes, rock slides, and heavy rain.

The following day, Jax, Luce and Jon climb the restricted mountain. Jax nearly falls from a ladder, but the trio continue using a "clip-in clip-out" method to cross the "Devil's Elbow". Heavy rain triggers a rock slide that separates Jax and Luce from Jon, who they believe has been killed. As they try to turn back, another rock slide destroys part of the planks and nearly pulls Jax from her clip. The women become stranded at the Devil's Elbow, unable to proceed or retreat, while their backpack hangs from an inaccessible support.

That night, they use Jon's laser pointer to signal the bar, but the bartender closes the blinds. The next day, Luce reveals that she has terminal cancer and has been avoiding her parents' calls. Meanwhile, Jax's grief, fear, exhaustion and altitude sickness begin distorting her perception. Reviewing Shiloh's old camera footage, she realizes that the woman beside her is not the Luce from Shiloh's life. Luce admits that her real name is Billie. A fan of Shiloh's channel, Billie discovered that Jax was selling Shiloh's truck and pretended to be her sister's friend, knowing Jax would not sell it to a fan. As she grew closer to Jax, Billie developed a genuine emotional connection with her and sought to help her overcome her grief and fear through the climb.

The following day, Jax and Billie realize that they are growing weaker. Using their backpack radio, they discover that Jon survived the rock slide and was merely knocked unconscious. Billie attempts to retrieve the backpack but is badly injured and nearly falls to her death before Jax saves her. Jax reaches the railing and calls Jon for help. Jon finds them, rescues them from the Devil's Elbow and contacts the authorities, requesting a helicopter to meet them on the other side of the mountain. The trio reach the dragon statue, where Jax pays tribute to Shiloh.

They then cross the final section of the plank walk, an unstable bridge spanning a high gap between Mount Kwan's peaks. Exhausted, Billie opens one of the O2 tanks Jon supplied and discovers drugs inside. Jon reveals that he took them on the illegal climb because he is smuggling fentanyl across the border, using climbers as unwitting drug mules. He also reveals that the approaching helicopter belongs to other traffickers rather than the authorities. Furious, Billie throws an O2 tank from the mountain. Jon responds by pushing her to her death.

Jon then attempts to kill Jax, but falls to his own death. When the helicopter arrives, Jax uses the remaining drugs as a bargaining chip and is rescued and taken back to the bar, where she buys a drink in memory of Billie. She later opens Shiloh's scrapbook and discovers another destination: Hell's Chasm.

Elsewhere, Shiloh's friend Becky Connor receives an invitation to Hell's Chasm to celebrate Shiloh's life.

== Cast ==
- Harriet Slater as Jax Hunter: Shiloh's younger sister
- Arsema Thomas as Luce / Billie: Shiloh's friend
- Tom Brittney as Jon Platt: Jax and Billie's guide
- Virginia Gardner as Shiloh Hunter: Jax's late sister

Additionally, Grace Caroline Currey reprises her role as Becky Connor in an uncredited cameo appearance. Adam Rose also makes a cameo in the film.

== Production ==
=== Development ===
Following the resurgence of the first film's popularity beginning with its streaming release on Netflix, a sequel was announced to be in early development by March 2023.

In October 2023, it was revealed that two sequels were concurrently in development, with intentions for the movies to enter production consecutively. During the announcement, the associated studios categorized Fall as a franchise. Scott Mann will serve as producer on both movies, while also serving as writer and director of the third movie. The two sequels will feature returning characters from the first installment and a new supporting cast as well. Mark Lane, James Harris, Christian Mercuri, and David Haring will serve as additional producers. The projects will be joint-venture productions between Tea Shop Productions, Flawless Productions Inc., and Capstone Pictures. Principal photography is scheduled to commence on the second movie in June 2024. By May 2024, Peter and Michael Spierig were announced as the co-directors for the first sequel film, from a script co-authored by Scott Mann and Jonathan Frank; while Scott Mann was named as an additional producer. In September 2025, Harriet Slater as Jax Hunter, Arsema Thomas as Luce, and Tom Brittney joined the cast. By May 2026, the film was retitled to Fall 2: Deadpoint.

=== Filming ===
Principal photography was scheduled to commence on the second movie in June 2024. In September 2025, it was announced that the project had commenced principal photography earlier that year on location in Thailand, and had completed production by that date.

== Release ==
=== Theatrical ===
Fall 2: Deadpoint was released in the United States on September 2, 2026. It was originally scheduled to be released on August 7, 2026. Arrangements for international distribution rights took place at the Toronto International Film Festival. Lionsgate Films assigned the team of Lionsgate Premiere to handle the film's United States theatrical release, even though the film itself still carries the main Lionsgate Films logo.

=== Home media ===
The film was released on VOD on October 6, 2026, and will be released on DVD and Blu-ray on November 17, 2026.

== Reception ==
=== Box office ===
Fall 2: Deadpoint grossed $5 million in the United States and Canada and $21.7 million in other territories, for a worldwide total of $26.7 million.

In the United States and Canada, Fall 2: Deadpoint was released alongside Onslaught and By Any Means, and was projected to gross around $2.6 million from 1,704 theaters in its four-day opening weekend. It went on to debut to $2.3 million.

=== Critical response ===
On the review aggregator website Rotten Tomatoes, 53% of 58 critics' reviews are positive, with an average rating of 5.3/10. The website's consensus reads: "The bottom doesn't completely fall out of Deadpoint thanks to the Spierig Brothers' penchant for sweat-inducing tension, but this sequel ups the stakes without proportionately scaling its characters' intelligence." Metacritic, which uses a weighted average, assigned the film a score of 54 out of 100, based on 12 critics, indicating "mixed or average" reviews. Audiences surveyed by CinemaScore gave the film an average grade of "B-" (down from the first film's "B"), on an A+ to F scale.

Todd Gilchrist of Variety gave the film a positive review, describing it as a "mostly successful sequel" and praising the film for successfully replicating the vertigo-inducing tension of the original without feeling like a carbon copy. Gilchrist also praised the film's expansion of the series into more pulpy territory while retaining its central survival-thriller appeal. Bill Bria of /Film awarded the film a score of 7 out of 10, praising its "wilder stakes" and "double the twists" while arguing that it succeeds as a nail-biting thriller rather than simply retreading the original. Bria also praised the performances of Harriet Slater and Arsema Thomas and the sequel's attempt to expand the Fall series into a more character-driven, soap-opera-like story.

Simon Abrams of The A.V. Club gave Fall 2: Deadpoint a C−, criticizing its "watery characterizations and bland dialogue" and arguing that its twists do little to improve the film's weak character development. Abrams praised some of the climbing sequences for being effectively dizzying and tense, but criticized the uneven pacing, flat performances, cheap-looking computer-generated effects, and failure to exploit the setting's potential for suspense.

== Sequel ==
In October 2023, it was revealed that two sequels to the original movie were in active development, with the projects expected to be produced back-to-back. The third movie will feature returning characters from the first two installments and include a new supporting cast as well.

Scott Mann, Mark Lane, James Harris, Christian Mercuri, and David Haring will serve as producers. The projects will be joint-venture productions between Tea Shop Productions, Flawless Productions Inc., and Capstone Pictures. Principal photography is scheduled to commence following the filming completion of Fall 2. The third installment will be written and directed by Mann.
