= Tom Rhys Harries =

Welsh actor

- Born: 8 October 1990 (age 36); Cardiff, Wales
- Education: Royal Welsh College of Music & Drama
- Occupation: Actor
- Years active: 2011–present
- Height: 180 cm (5 ft 11 in)

Tom Rhys Harries (born 8 October 1990) is a Welsh actor. His credits include Hunky Dory (2011), Jekyll and Hyde (2015), Unforgotten (2018), Slaughterhouse Rulez (2018), Britannia (2019), The Gentlemen (2019), White Lines (2020), Suspicion (2022), Sisi & I (2023), Kandahar (2023), How Kids Roll (2024), Doctor Who episode "Dot and Bubble" (2024), and Clayface (2026).

== Early life and education ==
Tom Rhys Harries was born in Cardiff, Wales, to a secondary school English teacher and a head teacher. He is the oldest of three and has a younger brother and sister. Rhys Harries trained the Royal Welsh College of Music & Drama in Cardiff, graduating in 2012 and he was made an Honorary Associate in 2020.

His first language is Welsh.

== Career ==
For his work in the theatre, Rhys Harries was named one of Screen International Stars of Tomorrow in 2012. In the theatre, Rhys Harries made his West End stage debut in 2014 in Jez Butterworth's Mojo alongside Colin Morgan, Rupert Grint, and Ben Whishaw at the Harold Pinter Theatre.

Rhys Harries has also acted in recurring roles in the television series Jekyll and Hyde (2015), Unforgotten (2018), and Britannia (2019).

Rhys Harries starred in the Guy Ritchie action comedy The Gentlemen, alongside Colin Farrell, Hugh Grant, and Matthew McConaughey. In 2020, Rhys Harries starred as Manchester DJ Axel Collins in the Netflix series White Lines, set on the island of Ibiza in the 1990s. The series' storyline revolved around his character Axel's death.

In 2022, Rhys Harries appeared as Eddie Walker in the Chris Long directed Apple TV+ series Suspicion, alongside co-stars Uma Thurman and Kunal Nayyar. In 2023, he appeared in Sisi & I as Captain Smythe and in Kandahar as Oliver Altman.

In 2024, he starred in Loris Lai's feature directorial debut How Kids Roll. In the same year, he starred in the fifth episode of the fourteenth series of Doctor Who "Dot and Bubble", as Ricky September, a friend of another character, Lindy, and a resident of Finetime.

In June 2025, Rhys Harries was cast as Matt Hagen / Clayface in the DC Universe film Clayface (2026).

== Personal life ==
Rhys Harries is in a relationship with Grammy-winning songwriter Amy Allen.

== Filmography ==
=== Film ===
Year	Title	Role	Notes
2011	Hunky Dory	Evan	
2014	Ironclad: Battle for Blood	Hubert de Vesci	
2014	The Inbetweeners 2	Partygoer	
2015	Under Milk Wood	Drowned / Willy Nilly	
2015	No Strings	(unknown)	Short film
2016	Hot Property	Harmony Ambrose	
2016	Spilt Milk	Frankie	Short film
2016	Crow	Crow	
2016	Panic	Dylan	Short film
2017	Dragonheart: Battle for the Heartfire	Edric	
2017	ERDEM x H&M: The Secret Life of Flowers	(unknown)	Short film
2018	Slaughterhouse Rulez	Clegg	
2019	The Gentlemen	Power Noel	
2021	Hireth	Will	Short film
2021	Yellowbird	Hiker	Short film
2023	Sisi & I	Captain Smythe	
2023	Kandahar	Oliver Altman	
2024	Closing In	(unknown)	Short film
2024	How Kids Roll	Dan	
2024	The Return	Peisander	
2026	Madfabulous	Nick Durant	
2026	Effi o Blaenau	Lee	
2026	Clayface	Matt Hagen / Clayface	
TBA	Much Love, C.	Oliver	Short film; post-production

=== Television ===
Year	Title	Role	Notes
2012	Parade's End	O Five Thomas	Mini-series; 1 episode
2014	If I Don't Come Home: Letters from D-Day	Maurice Hardstaff	Television film
2015	Midsomer Murders	Ryan Carnarvon	Episode: "A Vintage Murder"
2015	Hinterland	Gary Pearce	Episode: "Ceredigion"
2015	Jekyll and Hyde	Sackler	Mini-series; 9 episodes
2017	Chewing Gum	Preacher	Episode: "Orlando"
2018	Unforgotten	Eliot Hollis	6 episodes (series 3)
2019	Merched Parchus	Tom	S4C series; 3 episodes
2019	15 Days	Rhys	4 episodes
2019	Britannia	Mallin	6 episodes (series 2)
2020	White Lines	Axel Collins	10 episodes
2022	Suspicion	Eddie Walker / Liam McKenna	6 episodes
2022	The Split	Gus	Episode #3.2
2024	Big Mood	Johnny	Episode: "Down"
2024	Doctor Who	Ricky September	Episode: "Dot and Bubble"
2025	Wolf King	Prince Lucas (voice)	9 episodes (series 1 & 2)
2025	The Light in the Hall	Hari	6 episodes (series 2)
2026	Pierre	PC Mark Tanner	4 episodes

== Awards and nominations ==
Year	Awards	Category	Nominated work	Result	Ref.
2018	The Offies	Best Supporting Male in a Play	The Pitchfork Disney - Shoreditch Town Hall	Won	
