= Kandahar (2023 film) =

2023 film by Ric Roman Waugh

- Theatrical release poster
- Directed by: Ric Roman Waugh
- Written by: Mitchell LaFortune
- Produced by: Basil Iwanyk; Erica Lee; Brandon Boyea; Gerard Butler; Alan Siegel; Christian Mercuri; Scott LaStaiti; Ali Jaafar
- Starring: Gerard Butler; Navid Negahban; Ali Fazal; Bahador Foladi; Nina Toussaint-White; Vassilis Koukalani; Mark Arnold; Corey Johnson; Ravi Aujla; Ray Haratian; Tom Rhys Harries; Travis Fimmel
- Cinematography: MacGregor
- Edited by: Colby Parker Jr.
- Music by: David Buckley
- Production companies: MBC Studios; Capstone Pictures; Thunder Road; G-BASE Film Production
- Distributed by: Open Road Films
- Release date: May 26, 2023
- Running time: 120 minutes
- Country: United States
- Language: English
- Box office: $9.4 million

Kandahar, titled Mission Kandahar in Canada, is a 2023 American spy action thriller film directed by Ric Roman Waugh and written by Mitchell LaFortune. The film stars Gerard Butler (who is also a producer) and features a supporting cast that includes Ali Fazal, Navid Negahban, Bahador Foladi, Nina Toussaint-White, Tom Rhys Harries, Vassilis Koukalani, Mark Arnold, Corey Johnson, and Travis Fimmel. Loosely based on actual events, the story follows a CIA operative and his translator who flee Afghanistan after their covert mission is exposed.

The film was released in theaters on May 26, 2023, by Open Road Films.

== Plot ==
Tom Harris is a freelance undercover operative working for the CIA to insert malware into a secret Iranian nuclear research facility. Tom's cover is a field technician for a Swiss communications contractor. His mission is successful, and the malware causes the facility to self destruct, preventing the Iranians from acquiring more nuclear bombs.

The Iranian government has been monitoring a British journalist Luna Cujai. She receives evidence from a whistleblower of the CIA's ongoing sabotage of Iran's nuclear programs. After the facility is destroyed, she is abducted by Iranian agents overseen by Colonel Farzad Asadi. She tells the Iranians she suspects a link between the facility's destruction and the Swiss contractor because their contracts are next to government sites. The next day, Harris's partner in the operation, Oliver, is killed by the Iranian Special Forces after both Oliver and Harris's identity are compromised.

Tom leaves Iran en route to London via Dubai. While in Dubai, his flight to London is delayed, and he visits his CIA handler, Roman Chalmers. Roman is a Muslim convert, living under the outward pretense of a Dubai socialite, a lifestyle he secretly despises. Roman claims to have delayed the flight to force this meeting. Tom accepts Roman's lucrative CIA contract for a job in Herat, Afghanistan.

After he arrives in Herat, due to an intelligence leak, the news names Tom as the operative responsible for the destruction of the nuclear facility. With his cover now blown, the mission in Herat is aborted. Roman directs Tom and his Afghan-American translator Mohammad "Mo" Doud to an extraction point in Kandahar. Farzad and Pakistani security services learn Tom is in Herat, and each sends operatives to apprehend him, with Pakistan wanting to ransom Tom to the highest bidder. Tom and Mo are chased by Farzad and ISI agent Kahil Nassir but they elude both pursuing parties and escape to the desert.

En route to Kandahar, Tom and Mo are attacked by Farzad in a helicopter. Tom destroys the helicopter and kills Farzad and its crew. Now on foot, Tom and Mo seek aid from Tom's friend, an Afghan warlord not associated with the governing Taliban. Mo reveals to Tom and the warlord that the warlord killed Mo's son years ago. Despite angering the warlord, he provides Tom and Mo with a vehicle and they depart the warlord's camp.

Meanwhile, Roman stops communicating with the CIA and arrives in Afghanistan to join the Afghan commandos masquerading as an ISIS-K unit. Tom and Mo are captured by the local Taliban warlord paid by Kahil. Tom concludes his warlord friend sold him out. Roman and the commando fighters attack the compound where Tom and Mo are held captive. The Taliban warlord is killed. Kahil arrives at the scene of the battle and realizes the attack is a ruse backed by the CIA. Roman, Tom, and Mo escape by vehicle from the compound while the battle continues. Speculating that Tom will use an old CIA airbase to extract, Kahil organizes another Taliban unit to intercept Tom.

As Tom, Roman, and Mo reach the extraction point, Kahil attacks their vehicle. Roman is mortally wounded, and jumps from the vehicle to buy the rest time. Before dying, Roman recites the Shahada. After the Taliban fighters knock out their car, Tom fights Kahil and severely wounds him. A CIA director orders an unauthorized missile strike on the remaining Taliban pursuers. This enables Tom and Mo to escape on a British military cargo plane carrying Special Air Service operators. The British journalist is released while Tom and Mo reunite with their families.

== Cast ==
- Gerard Butler as Tom Harris, CIA and ex-MI6
- Navid Negahban as Mohammad "Mo" Doud
- Ali Fazal as Kahil Nasir, ISI agent
- Bahador Foladi as Farzad Asadi, Jerusalem Force
- Nina Toussaint-White as Luna Cujai
- Vassilis Koukalani as Bashar Hamadani, IRGC
- Mark Arnold as Mark Lowe
- Tom Rhys Harries as Oliver Altman
- Corey Johnson as Chris Hoyt
- Travis Fimmel as Roman Chalmers
- Hakeem Jomah as Rasoul, Taliban
- Ravi Aujla as Siraj Agha, ISI
- Ray Haratian as Ismail Rabbani, Afghan warlord
- Olivia-Mai Barrett as Ida Harris
- Rebecca Calder as Corrine Harris
- Faizan Munawar Varya as Eric Gracia
- Elnaaz Norouzi as Shina Asadi

== Production ==
In June 2016, former military intelligence officer Mitchell LaFortune sold his spec script Burn Run to Thunder Road Films. He based it on his experiences working for the Defense Intelligence Agency and being deployed to Afghanistan in 2013 during the Snowden leaks. In June 2020, it was announced Gerard Butler would produce and star in the film, which had been retitled Kandahar, reteaming with Angel Has Fallen and Greenland director Ric Roman Waugh.

Ali Fazal and Navid Negahban joined the cast in December 2021. Majority of filming commenced on December 2, 2021, in Saudi Arabia. This made the film the first big-budget U.S. feature to shoot in the country's Al-Ula and Jeddah. Nina Toussaint-White and Bahador Foladi joined the cast later that same month. Filming wrapped in January 2022. The production takes advantage of the Saudi Film Commission's 40% cash rebate.

== Release ==
In September 2022, Open Road Films acquired the film's U.S. distribution rights in an eight-figure deal. In January 2023, it was announced that the film would be released in theaters on May 26, 2023.

Kandahar was released for digital platforms on June 16, 2023, followed by a Blu-ray and DVD release on July 18, 2023.

== Reception ==
=== Box office ===
Kandahar grossed $4.8 million in the United States and Canada, and $4.6 million in other territories, for a worldwide gross of $9.4 million worldwide.

In the United States and Canada, Kandahar released alongside The Little Mermaid, The Machine, About My Father, and You Hurt My Feelings. The film made $921,000 from 2,105 theaters on its first day, a total of $2.3 million in its opening weekend, and $2.8 million during the four-day Memorial Day frame.

=== Critical response ===
On the review aggregator website Rotten Tomatoes, 45% of 102 critics' reviews are positive, with an average rating of 5.4/10. The website's consensus reads: "Gerard Butler remains a sturdy screen presence, but even for hardcore action fans, Kandahar is hardly worth watching." Metacritic, which uses a weighted average, assigned the film a score of 52 out of 100, based on 23 critics, indicating "mixed or average" reviews. Audiences surveyed by CinemaScore gave the film an average grade of "B+" on an A+ to F scale, while those polled by PostTrak gave it an overall 75% positive score, with 36% saying they would definitely recommend it.
