= That Which I Love Destroys Me =

2015 documentary film by Ric Roman Waugh

- Directed by: Ric Roman Waugh
- Produced by: Patricia Driscoll; Ric Roman Waugh; Jonathan Chibnall; Dana Gonzales
- Cinematography: Dana Gonzales
- Edited by: Jonathan Chibnall; Vashi Nedomansky
- Music by: Gerhard Daum
- Production company: Cadre Filmworks
- Release date: March 1, 2015 (Internet)
- Running time: 68 minutes
- Country: United States
- Language: English

That Which I Love Destroys Me is a 2015 American documentary film about post-traumatic stress disorder produced and directed by Ric Roman Waugh.

== Plot ==
The film presents interviews with veterans about their experiences with post-traumatic stress disorder.

== Interviewees ==
- Daniel B. Howe
- Tyler Grey
- Jayson Floyd
- Patricia Driscoll (President - Armed Forces Federation, CEO - Frontline Defense Systems)
- Danyel Paulson
- Randy Floyd
- Rep. Tim Murphy
- Sgt. Maj. Jeffrey J. Mellinger

== Release ==
The film was released on the Internet on military.com on March 1, 2015.

The film was broadcast by Pivot for Veterans Day on November 11, 2015.

== Reception ==
Lloyd I. Sederer, MD, Chief Medical Officer of the New York State Office of Mental Health, wrote, "This is a tough film to watch. But it needs to be to get past a viewer's defenses against what is truly a challenge to imagine for those of us sheltered from war. But by watching it we see how these two men entered the blackest of holes yet found ways to recover -- to achieve lives free of addiction, and lives reconstituted with relationships and purpose, tenuous as that hold may be."

Debbie Lynn Elias of behindthelens.com wrote, "The single most important and powerful documentary of the year for all Americans is Ric Roman Waugh's THAT WHICH I LOVE DESTROYS ME. If you see only one documentary all year, make it this one. Delivering a powerful, honest, eye-opening, and extremely humbling documentary on our returning veterans and the battlefield at home on which they fight the unseen enemies of PTSD and reintegration to societal norms, TWILDM hits home on all fronts."

In an interview, Jayson Floyd stated, "This is not just for veterans. This movie is for anyone with experience with any form of PTSD. Family members and friends will get a perspective into a world that most veterans don’t talk about. If you want to understand what's going through a veteran's head when they're actually making a healthy recovery, if you want to understand how you might be able to help your family member, if you're a veteran who wants to understand and be able to relate to someone that’s suffering from the same stuff that you are, sit down and watch the movie. It’s going to help put a voice to all the suffering, all the pain that you might not have been able to talk about. I you're a family member or a friend, it's going to help you rationalize and understand the process that it takes to heal. Ultimately, the more people that watch this, the more it normalizes the process the veterans are going through. It's a compounding exponential curve. The more people that watch it, the easier it gets for more veterans to come back to do it. When you watch it, you're adding to that healing factor for the soldiers that are coming back."
