= Snitch (film) =

2013 film by Ric Roman Waugh

- Theatrical release poster
- Directed by: Ric Roman Waugh
- Written by: Justin Haythe; Ric Roman Waugh
- Produced by: Dwayne Johnson; Nigel Sinclair; Matt Jackson; Jonathan King; Dany Garcia; Alex Brunner; Tobin Armbrust
- Starring: Dwayne Johnson; Barry Pepper; Jon Bernthal; Michael K. Williams; Melina Kanakaredes; Nadine Velazquez; Rafi Gavron; David Harbour; Benjamin Bratt; Susan Sarandon
- Cinematography: Dana Gonzales
- Edited by: Jonathan Chibnall
- Music by: Antonio Pinto
- Production companies: Exclusive Media; Participant Media; Image Nation
- Distributed by: Summit Entertainment (through Lionsgate)
- Release date: February 22, 2013 (United States)
- Running time: 112 minutes
- Country: United States
- Language: English
- Budget: $25 million
- Box office: $57.9 million

Snitch is a 2013 American action thriller film directed by Ric Roman Waugh and starring Dwayne Johnson, based on the experiences of DEA informant James Settembrino. The film was released in the United States on February 22, 2013. The film also stars Barry Pepper, Susan Sarandon, Jon Bernthal, Benjamin Bratt, and Michael Kenneth Williams. The plot focuses on John Matthews, who goes undercover for the DEA after his estranged son Jason Collins is framed in a drug deal by his best friend.

== Plot ==
In Missouri, college student Jason Collins is persuaded by his friend Craig to allow a shipment of drugs to be sent to his house. He signs for the package which contains pills and a tracking device. DEA officers break into the house; Jason flees but is chased down and arrested by Agent Cooper.

While at a barbecue, John Matthews, Jason's estranged father and owner of a construction company, is called by his ex-wife Sylvie about Jason's arrest. The ex-spouses meet with an investigator who explains Craig set Jason up to reduce his own sentence. Jason's charges carry a minimum of 10 years in prison, so he is pressured to inform on one of his own friends to reduce his own sentence. Jason is unable or unwilling to do this.

John arranges to meet with local United States Attorney Joanne Keeghan, who is running an aggressive anti-drug campaign. Keeghan agrees to reduce Jason's sentence if John informs on a drug dealer. Cooper leads a task force which will monitor any dealings John arranges to use as evidence for an arrest.

John scours his employee records and finds that new employee Daniel James has two prior distribution convictions. Daniel is currently leading a clean life to avoid a third strike. John offers $20,000 to be introduced a dealer; after much cajoling, Daniel agrees, though he is unaware that John is acting as an informant. Daniel introduces John to Malik, a high-ranking local drug dealer, who also has two strikes.

John tells Malik that his construction business cannot stay afloat in the current economy without a supplement to its revenues and offers to run nearly limitless amounts of drugs at almost zero risk in his freight trucks. Malik agrees under the condition that John and Daniel drive the initial run themselves.

John and Agent Cooper wire tap John's truck which he and Daniel drive to the pick-up point near the Mexican border. A rival gang ambushes the pick-up, but the drivers escape. This impresses cartel kingpin Pintera, whose men fight off the hijackers.

John delivers the drugs to Malik while under surveillance by Cooper, and Malik tells him that higher ranking cartel members want to meet. Hoping to catch the higher priority targets, Cooper does not arrest Malik as agreed. John goes to Keeghan, outraged, but she insists Cooper did the right thing and reneges on her promise to reduce Jason's sentence unless John cooperates in the second meeting.

Daniel learns of John's arrangement with the DEA and furiously tells John that the cartel will kill both of them and their families if they learn the truth; both men send their families into hiding. John meets with Pintera who tells John his next job is to transport cash to Mexico. Keeghan relishes the prospect of arresting such a high-profile cartel leader and agrees to release Jason immediately upon arresting Pintera. But Cooper has a change of heart and tries to talk John out of doing the run, suspecting the cartel will kill him afterwards.

John devises a plan to free himself and Daniel from both the government and the cartel. During the run, he switches trucks to escape Cooper's surveillance before picking up the cash. At the same time, Daniel sneaks into Malik's house, killing his guards and mortally wounding him. Before dying, Malik reveals Pintera's cell phone number to Daniel.

John calls Cooper and has him track both his and Pintera's phones, effectively giving Cooper both the money and the kingpin at once. The cartel realizes that John's son is Jason and that he is an informant which leads them on a highway chase and shootout before John escapes.

The cartel members and the money are seized by Cooper's men. Pintera is surrounded by federal agents and surrenders because his young son is with him. John leaves the large federal reward check that he received for the capture of Pintera for Daniel. Jason is released, and John and his family go into the witness protection program.

== Cast ==
- Dwayne Johnson as John Matthews, Analisa's husband, and Jason and Isabelle's father
- Barry Pepper as Drug Enforcement Administration Agent Cooper
- Benjamin Bratt as Juan Carlos "El Topo" Pintera
- Harold Perrineau as Assistant District Attorney Jeffery Steele
- Susan Sarandon as United States Attorney Joanne Keeghan
- Jon Bernthal as Daniel James
- Michael Kenneth Williams as Malik Anderson
- Melina Kanakaredes as Sylvie Collins, John's ex-wife and Jason's mother
- Nadine Velazquez as Analisa Matthews, John's wife and Isabelle's mother
- Rafi Gavron as Jason Collins, John and Sylvie's son
- David Harbour as Jay Price
- Kyara Campos as Isabelle Matthews, John and Analisa's daughter
- Jason Douglas as Wayne
- Richard Cabral as "Flaco"
- James Allen McCune as Craig Johnson, Jason's best friend
- J. D. Pardo as Benicio
- Kym Jackson as Drug Enforcement Administration Agent Sims
- Lela Loren as Vanessa James, Daniel's wife

== Production ==
Snitch is directed by Ric Roman Waugh and written by Waugh and Justin Haythe. The project was first set up in 2004 by Guy East and Nigel Sinclair, partners at Spitfire Pictures. They were inspired by a Frontline documentary about how changes to the federal drug policy of the United States encouraged the incarcerated to snitch on their accomplices.

Haythe wrote the initial screenplay, and Waugh was hired to rewrite it. In March 2011, actor Dwayne Johnson was cast in the film's starring role. Filming began in December 2011 in Bossier City, Louisiana, and concluded on January 19, 2012.

== Release ==
Snitch was released on February 22, 2013 in the United States and Canada. The film is distributed by Lionsgate subsidiary Summit Entertainment.

=== Home media ===
Lionsgate Home Entertainment released Snitch on DVD and Blu-ray on June 11, 2013, and on Ultra HD Blu-ray on June 6, 2017.

== Reception ==
=== Box office ===
Snitch opened in 2,511 theaters in the United States and grossed $13,167,607, with an average of $5,244 per theater, and ranking #2 at the box office. The film earned a total of $42,930,462 domestically and $14,894,212 internationally, for a total of $57,824,674.

=== Critical response ===
On review aggregator website Rotten Tomatoes, the film holds an approval rating of 57% based on 150 reviews, with an average rating of 5.60/10. The site's critics consensus states: "Though it features one of Dwayne Johnson's more thoughtful performances, the presentation of Snitch's underlying message is muddled by lackluster storytelling and some tonal inconsistencies." At Metacritic, the film has a weighted average score of 51 out of 100, based on 34 critics, indicating "mixed or average reviews". Audiences polled by CinemaScore gave the film an average grade of "B" on an A+ to F scale.
