= Clifton Bloomfield =

American serial killer (born 1969)

- Bloomfield's 2006 mugshot
- Born: Clifton Duane Bloomfield; March 1969 (age 57); Kingman, Arizona, U.S.
- Convictions: First degree murder (5 counts); Conspiracy to commit first degree murder Aggravated robbery Aggravated burglary (2 counts)
- Penalty: 5 life terms plus 45 years

Details
- Victims: 5
- Span of crimes: 2005–2008
- Country: United States
- State: New Mexico
- Date apprehended: July 1, 2008

Clifton Duane Bloomfield (born March 1969) is an American serial killer and former movie extra who was convicted of murdering five people in Albuquerque, New Mexico, between 2005 and 2008. During this period, he also appeared as a background character in the film Felon (2008).

== Early life ==
Bloomfield was raised in Kingman, Arizona. His earliest known encounter with the law occurred in 1979, when a judge ordered him to probation until his 18th birthday and to enroll in a children's home in Tucson following a BB gun incident. After his release, he returned to live with his parents, who made him visit mental health clinics daily, where he was prescribed mesoridazine, a drug used to treat schizophrenia. Despite this, his criminal behavior continued. At thirteen, he stole a motorcycle and broke into a church. Seven years later, he and his sister went on a crime spree in Phoenix for which he received a fourteen-year prison sentence. He was released in 2002.

== Murders ==
=== 2005 murder ===
On the night of October 24, 2005, Bloomfield dined at a Fuddruckers restaurant in Albuquerque. After leaving, he claimed that one Carlos Esquibel made advances on him. He then went with him to his apartment on Walter SE. Once in the bedroom, he strangled Esquibel with his own shirt and searched the apartment for valuables before leaving. His body was found by the landlord hours later.

On October 27, Bloomfield reportedly noticed the back door of a house was ajar while walking late at night. Inside, he searched through a purse on the kitchen table before moving to the other rooms. In a bedroom, he stole jewelry and was confronted by the homeowner, Josephine Selvage, a retired schoolteacher with Alzheimer's disease. Bloomfield overpowered and strangled her with a piece of clothing. He then left the house without taking anything else. Since the two murders occurred only days apart and in close proximity, the police initially investigated a connection but later, incorrectly, concluded they were unrelated.

=== Theft and work as a film extra ===
Two months after the killings, Bloomfield forced an elderly couple to allow him into their garage in the village of Los Ranchos at gunpoint, where he stole cash. Later that day, he proposed to his girlfriend. Months afterward, the United States Marshals Service arrested him in Texas for this home invasion. Upon returning to New Mexico, he initially maintained his innocence but later pleaded guilty and served eighteen months in jail.

After his release, he resumed work as a roofer and a film extra, appearing in Felon (2008). When auditioning, he claimed he had also worked as an actor on Breaking Bad (2008–2013).

=== 2007–2008 murders ===
Scott Pierce, Bloomfield's final victim

On December 4, 2007, Bloomfield entered a house on Avenida la Costa NE through a sliding glass door. Inside, the homeowner, Tak Yi, attempted to fight him off but was beaten to death. He also killed Tak's wife, Pung, although he later claimed a friend was responsible. Police initially arrested two magazine salesmen for the murders, one of whom even confessed, but both were later released following Bloomfield's arrest.

On June 28, 2008, Bloomfield and his accomplice, Jason Skaggs, conspired to kill a man named Manny. They broke into a house wearing ski masks and armed with shotguns, but instead encountered Katherine Bailey and her husband, Scott Pierce, whom they killed upon mistaking for Manny.

=== Arrest ===
On July 1, 2008, Bloomfield and Skaggs were arrested for the murder of Scott Pierce. DNA evidence later linked Bloomfield to the other killings. To avoid a possible death sentence, he pleaded guilty to ten charges, including five counts of first degree murder, and was sentenced to five life terms plus 45 years. Skaggs pleaded guilty to four charges, including second-degree murder and aggravated burglary with a deadly weapon, and received a thirty-and-a-half-year sentence.

== See also ==
- List of serial killers in the United States
