= Gerhard Daum =

Gerhard Daum is a German composer specialising in film scores, musician and music producer.

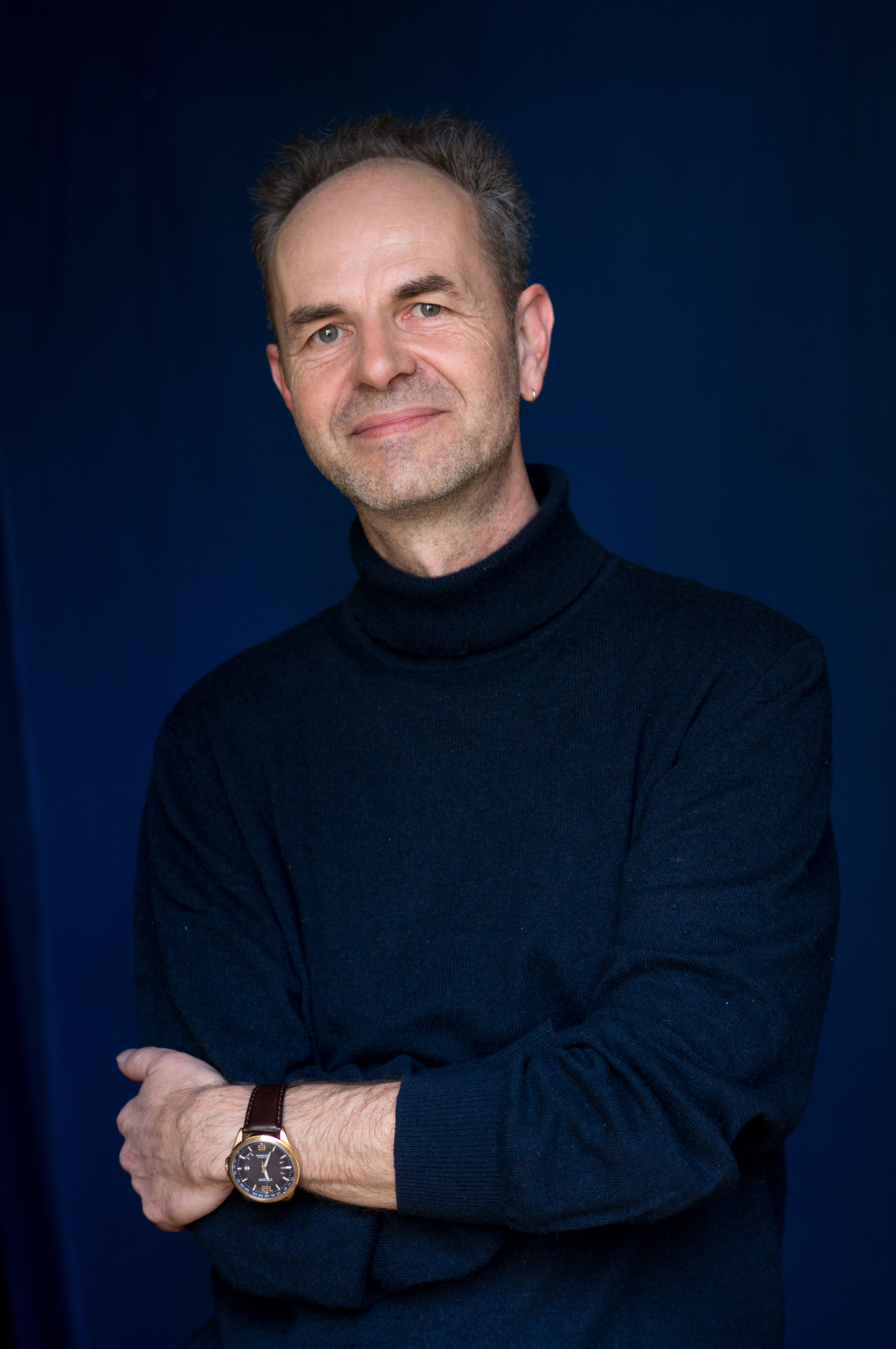
Composer Gerhard Daum

== Biography ==
Gerhard Daum, born on September 30, 1956, in the southern German city of Freiburg im Breisgau, developed an interest in music early in his childhood. He began playing the trumpet in his youth and performed with several brass bands. As a teenager, he also learned to play the guitar and piano before starting his studies in music. Daum attended the University of Music in Karlsruhe, where he graduated with a music diploma, with classical guitar as his main instrument. His studies included a semester at the University of Music and Performing Arts, Graz, Austria, where he focused on jazz and improvisation.

Following his studies, Daum worked as a guitar teacher at the renowned Jazz & Rock School Freiburg from 1985. During this time, he also toured through Europe with his own jazz and rock ensemble, the Gerhard Daum Quartett, performing in Germany, France.., Switzerland and Austria. He later founded the music publishing company Gerhard Daum Music Edition in 1993 and his label ToneWork Records in 1995.

His focus switched to film music after the Bayerischer Rundfunk offered him a job in Munich. Inspired by the scores of Ennio Morricone, Bernard Herrmann, John Barry, and John Williams, among others, Daum began composing scores for German films and TV series, including Tatort

To further his knowledge, Daum moved to Hollywood in 1997. He took Music Ethnology classes at CSUN and participated in the film music master class at UCLA. Daum gathered international experience and composed scores for productions such as Sony's Felon.

He currently lives in Berlin, where he continues to compose for a variety of productions.

== Work ==
A versatile composer, Daum has worked on music for film, television series, commercials, and video games in Germany and the US and has won awards for his work.

Of the numerous television series Daum has composed music for, highlights include Forsthaus Falkenau, Die Garmisch-Cops, and German cult TV series Tatort. He gained recognition through his scores for independent feature films such as Reflex Action, Hollywood Kills, Prince of Swine and most notably for the Hollywood action drama Felon, starring Val Kilmer, Sam Shephard, and Stephen Dorff. The music from the movie was performed by the Bavarian Radio Symphony Orchestra at the Film Music Night in Munich in 2009.

His music for the image film Every Child Counts won the NTVA Music Competition Gold Award in 2001

Daum also made a name for himself with his scores for documentaries, in particular the soundtrack to the German documentary Hindenburg & Hitler – The Making of a Führer and the US film That Which I Love Destroys Me, which won the Voice Award 2015 at UCLA's Royce Hall.

In addition to film music, Daum has produced several solo CD projects. His debut album, a world music project titled Mental Voyager – A Music Journey, was released in 1993 on the label ToneWorks Records and was re-released in 2014. A second album followed in 1996, Mental Voyager – Voiceland, which was one of few Dolby Surround releases at the time. The album comprises seven songs, a postmodern, neoclassical crossover between epic, symphonic elements, classical solo voices and rock, combined with electronic sound design. The songs feature vocals by members of the Bayerischer Rundfunk Choir, Cambridge Consort Voices and Historisches Ensemble Regensburg.

Daum released a further solo project on ToneWorks Records in 2015, Epic Drama, which includes epic tracks for orchestra, electric guitars, drums, solo voices and choirs in a postmodern neo-classic rock symphonic style.

Film Music Suites, released on ToneWork Records in 2017, presents a collection of suites, re-orchestrated from Daum's recent original compositions for film and TV. All of the pieces were recorded with the Brandenburger Symphoniker under the direction of Hannes Ferrand.

Since 2001, Daum has also composed and produced industrial releases for film, television and games for the Gerhard Daum Music Edition/ToneWorks Records, first in Los Angeles and now in Berlin. These include Explosive Choirs (2007), Green Evolution (2008), Storm Guitars (2009), and 3D-Scoring (2012).

== Filmography ==
- That Which I Love Destroys Me (USA, 2015)
- Die Garmisch-Cops (Germany, 2012–2014))
- Hindenburg – Der Mann, der Hitler zum Kanzler machte (Germany, 2014)
- Felon (USA, 2008)
- Prince of Swine (USA, 2010)
- Hollywood Kills (USA, 2006)
- Hatchetman (USA, 2003)
- One of Us (USA, 2002)
- Reflex Action (USA, 2002)
- The Strange Case of Mr. K (Italy, France, Germany, 2001)
- Hitmen (USA, 2000)
- Love, Ltd. (USA, 2000)
- Große Freiheit (Germany, 1997)
- Au Pair (UK, Germany, 1994)
- Stella Stellaris (Germany, 1994)
- Forsthaus Falkenau (17 episodes, Germany, 1991–1992)
- Das größte Fest des Jahres – Weihnachten bei unseren Fernsehfamilien (Germany, 1991))
- Tatort – "Bier vom Fass" (Germany, 1989)

== Discography ==
=== Soundtracks ===
- That Which I Love Destroys Me (2015)
- Hindenburg & Hitler – The Making of a Führer (2014)
- Film Music Collection II (2012)

=== Solo Projects ===
- Epic Drama (2015)
- Mental Voyager – Voiceland (1996, rereleased 2015)
- Mental Voyager – A Music Journey (1993, rereleased 2014)
- Film Music Suites – The Brandenburger Symphoniker play Film Music Suites from original film & TV themes, composed by Gerhard Daum (released 2017)
