= Florence Dobson =

English actress (born 1998)

- Born: 1998 (age 27–28); Barrow-in-Furness, Cumbria, England
- Education: Royal Academy of Dramatic Art
- Occupation: Actress
- Years active: 2020–present

Florence Dobson (born 1998) is an English actress. She trained at the Royal Academy of Dramatic Art (RADA), graduating in 2021 with a BA in Acting. Her television credits include Queen Charlotte: A Bridgerton Story and Compulsion, while her film credits include Blitz.

== Early life and education ==
Dobson is from the Lake District and is based in London. She studied acting at the Royal Academy of Dramatic Art, graduating in 2021. During her training, she was the first recipient of the Tony Warren Drama Student Bursary and received the James Westaway Award.

While at RADA, Dobson appeared in productions including The Seagull, As You Like It, Ion, The Busie Body, King Lear and Much Ado About Nothing.

== Career ==
=== Television ===
Dobson appeared in the 2022 Channel 5 drama series Compulsion as Rena Morris. She appeared in all four episodes of the series.

In 2023, Dobson appeared in the Netflix miniseries Queen Charlotte: A Bridgerton Story, a prequel to Bridgerton. She portrayed Princess Victoria, appearing in the episodes "Gardens in Bloom" and "Crown Jewels".

=== Film ===
Dobson appeared in the short films Trapstar and Venus Flytrap, both directed by Beru Tessema and produced through RADA. In Venus Flytrap, she played Jennifer, while she was credited as a singer in Trapstar.

In 2024, Dobson appeared in Steve McQueen's film Blitz as a Tube Singer.

=== Theatre ===
Dobson's theatre credits include Anna Karenina at Chichester Festival Theatre, The Invention of Love at the Hampstead Theatre, A Mirror at the Trafalgar Theatre and Cold Threats at London Performance Studios.

Her RADA theatre credits included Masha in The Seagull, Jaques in As You Like It, Creusa in Ion, Isabinda in The Busie Body, Goneril in King Lear and Don John in Much Ado About Nothing.

== Filmography ==
- Compulsion (2022) as Rena Morris
- Queen Charlotte: A Bridgerton Story (2023) as Princess Victoria
- Venus Flytrap as Jennifer
- Trapstar as Singer
- Blitz (2024) as Tube Singer

== Theatre ==
- Anna Karenina as Marya / Betsie – Chichester Festival Theatre
- The Invention of Love as Katherine Housman – Hampstead Theatre
- A Mirror as various roles / understudy Mei – Trafalgar Theatre
- Cold Threats as Angela Stewart Park – London Performance Studios
- The Seagull as Masha – RADA
- As You Like It as Jaques – RADA
- Ion as Creusa – RADA
- The Busie Body as Isabinda – RADA
- King Lear as Goneril – RADA
- Much Ado About Nothing as Don John – RADA
