= Felon (film) =

2008 film directed by Ric Roman Waugh

- Official promotional poster
- Directed by: Ric Roman Waugh
- Written by: Ric Roman Waugh
- Produced by: Dan Keston; Nick Phillips; Christopher Wilhem
- Starring: Stephen Dorff; Harold Perrineau; Marisol Nichols; Anne Archer; Johnny Lewis; Nate Parker; Sam Shepard; Val Kilmer
- Cinematography: Dana Gonzales
- Edited by: Jonathan Chibnall
- Music by: Gerhard Daum
- Production company: Stage 6 Films
- Distributed by: Sony Pictures Home Entertainment
- Release date: July 18, 2008
- Running time: 104 minutes
- Country: United States
- Language: English
- Budget: $2.9 million

Felon is a 2008 American prison film written and directed by Ric Roman Waugh. The film stars Stephen Dorff, Val Kilmer and Harold Perrineau. The film tells the story of the family man who ends up in state prison after he kills an intruder. The story is based on events that took place in the 1990s at the notorious California State Prison, Corcoran. The film was released in the United States on July 18, 2008.

== Plot ==
Wade Porter is a blue-collar worker living with his fiancée Laura and their son Michael. One night, they hear a burglar in the house while they're sleeping. Wade chases him out of the house and hits him in the head with a baseball bat, unintentionally killing him on his lawn. For attacking an unarmed intruder after he exited the house, he is arrested and charged with murder. At the urging of his public defender, he enters a plea of no contest in exchange for a reduced sentence of three years for involuntary manslaughter.

During the bus ride to prison, Danny Sampson, leader of the local Aryan Brotherhood, stabs a man and hides the knife with young Aryan member Snowman who is sitting behind Wade. In a moment's panic, Snowman hides the knife under Wade's seat and forces him to deny knowledge of it.

As a result, Wade is sent to solitary confinement until the stabbing can be investigated. Lieutenant Jackson interrogates him about the stabbing but he doesn't cooperate with the investigation. Jackson decides to send Wade to the Security Housing Unit (SHU) where he is the commanding officer.

John Smith is serving a life sentence at San Quentin State Prison and is transferred to Wade's prison, becoming his cellmate in the SHU. Inmates here are under 23-hour lock-down and not permitted to have visitors for the first three months. Wade discovers the daily hour of yard time consists of inmate fights, on which the officers bet. At different points throughout the film, it's shown that not all of the officers agree with Jackson's methods.

In addition to the prison violence, Wade's regular visits with Laura start to take their toll on their relationship. Michael has nightmares after visiting, and the family's finances are running low. After Wade refuses to identify Sampson as the perpetrator of the murder on the bus, Jackson falsely testifies that he was an accessory to the murder, resulting in an additional three years being added to his existing sentence.

Laura, under pressure from her mother, breaks off the relationship with Wade through a letter. Broken and enraged, he resorts to fighting the prisoners in exchange for protection from Sampson and the Aryan Brotherhood.

Wade and John devise a plan to reveal the truth about the violence in the prison, and possibly get him released. During the next yard time, Wade refuses to kill an inmate after defeating him in a fight. A furious Jackson enters the yard and prepares to attack him, but Smith kills him by severing his femoral artery and throat with a concealed shiv. Another yard officer then shoots Smith, who dies from his wounds.

With the help of a retired correctional officer at Smith's former prison, the FBI, and Laura, the corruption of the prison officers is exposed and Wade's additional sentence is commuted. He is released after 15 months in prison and reunited with his family.

== Cast ==
- Stephen Dorff as Wade Porter
- Marisol Nichols as Laura Porter
- Vincent Miller as Michael Porter
- Val Kilmer as John Smith
- Harold Perrineau as Lieutenant Bill Jackson
- Greg Serano as Officer Diaz
- Johnny Lewis as Jake 'Snowman'
- Nate Parker as Officer James Collins
- Nick Chinlund as Sergeant Roberts
- Anne Archer as Maggie
- Sam Shepard as Gordon
- Chris Browning as Danny Sampson
- Jake Walker as Warden Frank Harris

The convicted serial killer Clifton Bloomfield was featured in this film as an extra. The production crew were unaware of his crimes until after filming was completed.

== Production ==
Felon is set and was filmed in Santa Fe, New Mexico in 24 days between October 9 and November 2, 2007.

== Reception ==
On review aggregator website Rotten Tomatoes, the film holds an approval rating of 60% based on 25 reviews, with an average rating of 6.45/10. The website's critics consensus reads: "Felon offers a rather hackneyed depiction of prison life, but is held together by a pleasantly complex plot and solid performances from Kilmer and Dorff." On Metacritic, the film has a weighted average score of 58 out of 100, based on 10 critics, indicating "mixed or average" reviews. The film had a limited screening in the US.

== Home media ==
DVD was released in Region 1 in the United States on August 12, 2008, and also Region 2 in the United Kingdom on October 6, 2008, it was distributed by Sony Pictures Home Entertainment.
