= In the Shadows (2001 film) =

2001 film by Ric Roman Waugh

- Directed by: Ric Roman Waugh
- Written by: Ric Roman Waugh
- Produced by: David Glasser
- Starring: Matthew Modine; James Caan; Joey Lauren Adams; Lillo Brancato; Cuba Gooding Jr.
- Cinematography: Chuck Cohen
- Edited by: Martin Hunter
- Music by: Adam Gorgoni
- Production companies: Cutting Edge Entertainment; Newman/Tooley Films
- Distributed by: Lionsgate
- Release date: June 22, 2001 (United States)
- Running time: 105 minutes
- Country: United States
- Language: English
- Budget: $10 million

In the Shadows is a 2001 American thriller film written and directed by Ric Roman Waugh and starring Matthew Modine, James Caan, Joey Lauren Adams, Lillo Brancato and Cuba Gooding Jr. It was released in the United States on June 22, 2001. In the film, Modine plays hit man Eric O'Bryne, who is sent to kill veteran Hollywood stuntman Lance Huston (Caan), falls in love with the target's daughter (Adams) and then decides to become a stuntman himself.

== Plot ==
Hit man Eric O'Byrne has orders from the mob: kill Hollywood stunt coordinator Lance Huston. In order to make the hit, Eric travels to Miami and ingratiates himself into Lance's world as a stuntman. He also slips into a dangerous romance with Lance's daughter, Clarissa. As time draws near for O'Byrne to perform his deadly act, he starts to grow a conscience, a development that could be his greatest asset or his fatal weakness (or both).

== Cast ==
- Matthew Modine as Eric O'Byrne
- James Caan as Lance Huston
- Joey Lauren Adams as Clarissa Huston
- Lillo Brancato as Jimmy Pierazzi
- Cuba Gooding Jr. as FBI Agent Draven
- Jeff Chase as FBI Agent Sergei
- Antoni Corone as Vito
- Val Avery as Carlo Pierazzi

== Reception ==
DVD Talk rated the film favorably, writing that "Ric Roman Waugh is competent behind the camera for his directorial debut, and the film benefits from a strong cast." TV Guide was more negative, as they felt that "This overly complicated wise-guy adventure makes good use of the stunt work background. But it falters in the areas of characterization, plot resolution and general narrative credibility."
