= Queen Charlotte: A Bridgerton Story =

2023 Netflix limited series

- Promotional poster
- Genre: Alternate history; Historical romance
- Created by: Shonda Rhimes
- Directed by: Tom Verica
- Starring: India Amarteifio; Arsema Thomas; Michelle Fairley; Ruth Gemmell; Corey Mylchreest; Golda Rosheuvel; Adjoa Andoh; Sam Clemmett; Freddie Dennis; Hugh Sachs; Julie Andrews
- Composer: Kris Bowers
- Country of origin: United States
- No. of episodes: 6

Production
- Executive producers: Shonda Rhimes; Betsy Beers; Tom Verica
- Producer: Anna O'Malley
- Cinematography: Jeffrey Jur
- Running time: 53–85 minutes
- Production company: Shondaland

Original release
- Network: Netflix
- Release: May 4, 2023

Related
- Bridgerton

Queen Charlotte: A Bridgerton Story is an American historical romance television limited series created by Shonda Rhimes for Netflix. The series is a prequel spin-off of the Netflix series Bridgerton. The story is loosely based on an alternate history take on the rise of Charlotte of Mecklenburg-Strelitz to prominence and power in the late 18th century. The series premiered on May 4, 2023.

The series received generally favorable reviews from critics, who appreciated the performances of Arsema Thomas and India Amarteifio. It was nominated at the 75th Primetime Creative Arts Emmy Awards for costume design, make-up and hairstyle, winning the latter; Julie Andrews was also nominated for her voice-over performance. Shonda Rhimes won the Black Reel Award for Outstanding Writing, Drama Series and the series was recognized at the NAACP Image Awards for Outstanding Drama Series.

Kris Bowers's score and soundtrack, containing reinterpretations of pop songs in a classical style, was well-received, with Alicia Keys's song "If I Ain't Got You" being nominated at the MTV Video Music Award for Best Video for Good.

In the first week after its premiere, the series debuted at number one in 91 countries, including the United States, the United Kingdom, Australia, India, South Africa and Canada, and topped the Netflix Global Weekly Top 10 on May 7, 2023.

== Premise ==
The spin-off miniseries revolving around Queen Charlotte consists of two plot lines: one in the present timeline of Bridgerton, beginning with the death of the royal heir Princess Charlotte, (Note: This plotline depicts historical events that happened in the years 1817–1818, but is set between Seasons 2 and 3 (1814–1815) in the fictional timeline of Bridgerton.) an event that causes the Queen to pressure her children to marry and produce another royal heir; the other begins with Charlotte meeting and marrying King George. The latter explores the King and Queen's marriage and his mental illness.

== Cast and characters ==
=== Main ===
- Golda Rosheuvel as Queen Charlotte
  - India Amarteifio as young Queen Charlotte
- Adjoa Andoh as Agatha, Lady Danbury, a sharp-tongued, insightful doyenne of London society
  - Arsema Thomas as young Agatha, Lady Danbury, Queen Charlotte's lady-in-waiting
- Michelle Fairley as Augusta, Dowager Princess of Wales, King George's mother
- Ruth Gemmell as Violet, Dowager Viscountess Bridgerton, mother of the Bridgerton children
  - Connie Jenkins-Greig as young Violet Ledger
- Corey Mylchreest as young King George III
- Hugh Sachs as Brimsley, the Queen's secretary
  - Sam Clemmett as young Brimsley, the Queen's secretary
- Freddie Dennis as Reynolds, the King's secretary
- Julie Andrews as the voice of Lady Whistledown, an author of gossip columns

=== Recurring ===
- Tunji Kasim as Adolphus IV, Duke of Mecklenburg-Strelitz, Queen Charlotte's older brother
- Cyril Nri as Lord Herman Danbury, Lady Danbury's husband
- Peyvand Sadeghian as Coral, Lady Danbury's maid
- Ryan Gage as George, Prince of Wales, Queen Charlotte's eldest son, the Prince Regent of the United Kingdom
- Joshua Riley as Prince Adolphus, Queen Charlotte's seventh son
- Jack Michael Stacey as Prince Edward, Queen Charlotte's fourth son
- Seamus Dillane as Prince William, Queen Charlotte's third son
- Eliza Capel as Princess Sophia, Queen Charlotte's fifth daughter
- Neil Edmond as the Earl Harcourt
- Richard Cunningham as Lord Bute, Prime Minister of Great Britain
- Guy Henry as John Monro, the King's physician
- Keir Charles as Lord Ledger, Violet's father

=== Guests ===
- Sabina Arthur as Princess Elizabeth, Queen Charlotte's third daughter
- Ben Cura as Prince Augustus, Queen Charlotte's sixth son
- Harvey Almond as Prince Ernest, Queen Charlotte's fifth son
- Felix Brunger as Prince Frederick, Queen Charlotte's second son
- Katie Brayben as Lady Vivian Ledger, Violet's mother
- Helen Coathup as Princess Augusta, Queen Charlotte's second daughter
- Sophie Harkness as Princess Adelaide, wife of Prince William
- Florence Dobson as Princess Victoria, wife of Prince Edward
- Isaiah Ajiboye as Dominic Danbury, Lady Danbury's son
- Lemar as Lord Smythe-Smith
- Nicola Alexis as Lady Smythe-Smith
- Harry Omosele as the Duke of Hastings
- James Fleet as King George III

== Episodes ==
No.	Title	Directed by	Written by	Original release date
1	"Queen to Be"	Tom Verica	Shonda Rhimes	May 4, 2023
A young Charlotte's brother, Adolphus, signs a contract marrying her to George III. Charlotte is unhappy with the idea of the marriage. Upon seeing her and realizing she's black, the King's mother, Princess Augusta, invites several prominent people of color to the wedding and grants them titles on her son's behalf, effectively desegregating society. This comes to be referred to as "the Great Experiment". Before the wedding can go through, Charlotte attempts to run away but is caught by a charming man who turns out to be her future husband. He introduces himself and tells her of interests and charms her by telling her that he is 'just George'. She decides to go through with the marriage, and they spend a wonderful evening laughing and dancing at the wedding reception but Charlotte is surprised when, on the night of the wedding, the King presents her with her own house, Buckingham House, while revealing that he intends to live separately from her in Kew Palace. When she confronts him about this arrangement, he angrily snaps at her, and she retreats before he leaves her alone on their wedding night. In the present day, Queen Charlotte learns that her only legitimate granddaughter, Princess Charlotte of Wales, has died in childbirth, kicking off a succession crisis as between all her living children, her sons have only produced bastards and her daughters largely remain unwed. She urges her surviving 12 children to produce legitimate heirs.
2	"Honeymoon Bliss"	Tom Verica	Shonda Rhimes	May 4, 2023
After her wedding, Charlotte spends most of her honeymoon alone, having no one to talk to other than Brimsley. She invites the newly minted Lady Danbury to tea, where Agatha discovers Charlotte's ignorance of the marital act and explains sex to her. Princess Augusta, desperate to know if her son has consummated his marriage, tries to pressure Lady Danbury into telling her. Lady Danbury, who is still suffering from segregated society despite her husband's title, uses her leverage to pressure Princess Augusta into further supporting her and her husband. Tired of solitude, Charlotte decides to visit Kew, where George reveals that he left her on their marriage night as he was charting the Transit of Venus. He asks Charlotte for a redo of their marriage night, and the two finally consummate their marriage. However, the following morning she overhears a conversation between George and his mother in which he reveals that he is hiding his true self from her. Charlotte retreats, no longer certain what to make of her husband.
3	"Even Days"	Tom Verica	Shonda Rhimes	May 4, 2023
After Charlotte overhears the discussion with Princess Augusta, her relationship with George becomes strained. Nevertheless, they have a passionate sex life, agreeing to see each other on even days so that Charlotte may get pregnant. After seeing that George also has a passion for agriculture, Charlotte decides to accept her husband for who he is and reconciles with him, deciding to be a team. Lord Danbury, frustrated by being rebuffed from participating in activities with the men of the ton, engages in frequent sex with his wife to temper his frustrations. He decides he wants to host the first ball of the season in an attempt to gain acceptance and recognition from the rest of the peerage, and Agatha grows desperate to ensure the success of the event to earn a reprieve from her husband’s attentions. Despite not having Princess Augusta's full support, Lady Danbury issues invitations and is rejected by the white members of the ton. She asks for Queen Charlotte's support, pointing out that the newly made members of the ton are in a precarious position. Realizing she has let herself be blinded to their plight, Charlotte convinces George go to the Danburys’ ball, which is a success. Afterward, Lord Danbury dies during sexual intercourse with his wife. Charlotte awakens on the night of the ball to discover George running outside and stripping naked to praise Venus. Charlotte convinces him she is Venus and guides him back inside.
4	"Holding the King"	Tom Verica	Nicholas Nardini	May 4, 2023
Flashbacks reveal that Princess Augusta arranged George's marriage behind his back as he was frightened of the prospect of marriage due to his uncontrolled symptoms of mental illness. (Note: Historians and medical experts have suggested that King George's symptoms and behaviour traits were consistent with bipolar disorder or porphyria.) Doctor Monro suggests there is nothing wrong with him and that his breakdowns are due to a lack of discipline. Quickly falling in love with Charlotte, George removes himself from her presence to follow a torturous program set up by Monro to break him. Feeling better and missing Charlotte, George decides to move back in with her. He dismisses Monro only to discover that Charlotte has decided to keep him as her physician as she is pregnant. Her pregnancy triggers a mental crisis in George, leading to his late-night visions of Venus in the garden. In the present, Charlotte confronts Princess Augusta about the nature of George's condition and how it was hidden from her before the wedding. George overhears this argument and returns to Buckingham to seek out Monro and resume the brutal courses of treatment to cure himself for Charlotte and their unborn child.
5	"Gardens in Bloom"	Tom Verica	Story by : Shonda Rhimes; Teleplay by : Shonda Rhimes and Nicholas Nardini	May 4, 2023
The funeral is held for Lord Danbury, which is attended by Lord Ledger and Violet Ledger. Agatha is restless with grief and confides in Coral about her marriage, which had been contracted when she was three years old, and how she was raised to be his wife. She laments that she does not know her own identity now that he is gone. George continues the intensive treatments with Monro and remains isolated, even refusing letters from Charlotte under the doctor’s instruction. Princess Augusta learns that Charlotte is pregnant and announces plans to move into Buckingham House. Charlotte becomes frustrated at her lack of headway with George and Augusta’s suffocating presence and her oversight of royal matters on George's behalf. She writes to her brother Adolphus and asks him to take her home when he visits. The other non-white members of the ton ask Agatha to figure out her matters of succession; though she brings her young son to Princess Augusta, she does not get a clear answer on whether he will inherit his father's peerage. Charlotte visits Agatha and is encouraged to assert herself, confronting Monro and retrieving George. Agatha begins taking solitary daily walks to meet with Lord Ledger, and the two sleep together with Agatha enjoying the pleasures of sex for the first time. In the present day, Charlotte betroths two of her sons to eligible princesses. At an art viewing, Violet admits to Agatha that she has newfound sexual longings and desire for intimate companionship. Agatha assures Violet that they are friends and that Violet can confide in her.
6	"Crown Jewels"	Tom Verica	Shonda Rhimes	May 4, 2023
Late at night, Monro makes an emergency visit to Princess Augusta to inform her that Charlotte has had him dismissed from treating George. Augusta attempts to visit George to persuade him to rehire the doctor. She finds that Charlotte has begun asserting herself as Queen and is eliminating Augusta's influence over the royal household and the King. The reunited Charlotte and George argue about whether they should remain apart, but Charlotte convinces George she does not care whether he is mad and wants to remain with him. They affirm their mutual love and desire to be together. Charlotte goes into labour and gives birth to a baby boy. George remains by her side during the difficult breech birth despite the Archbishop of Canterbury telling him protocol is to remain outside the Queen’s chambers during delivery. In spite of his high spirits, George is unable to appear before Parliament, leading to rumours that he is unfit to rule. Meanwhile, Agatha goes to meet Lord Ledger and finds Violet accompanying him at the behest of her mother. Worrying Lady Ledger may know of their affair, they tacitly agree to end their meetings. Princess Augusta is unyielding on the matter of succession for Agatha's son Dominic to inherit the title of Lord Danbury. Agatha refuses to give information to the dowager Princess, who offers her admiration and advice on how to survive widowhood. She also allows Adolphus to start courting Agatha, who contemplates marrying him to secure her and her children's futures. George successfully hosts a ball with the dual purpose of celebrating their son's birth and presenting himself as a capable ruler. During the ball, Charlotte secretly tells George she is pregnant again. At the ball Adolphus proposes to Agatha, but she is unwilling to be trapped in another marriage and rejects him. An accepting Charlotte tells Agatha that she will assist her with keeping the title bestowed on her and to be passed down to her son. In the present day, Violet suspects that Agatha had a liaison with her father years ago, but the two continue their friendship. Charlotte visits George to tell him that Princess Victoria is pregnant and that their line will continue. The two lie together and look at each other smiling as they did in their youth.

== Production ==
=== Development ===
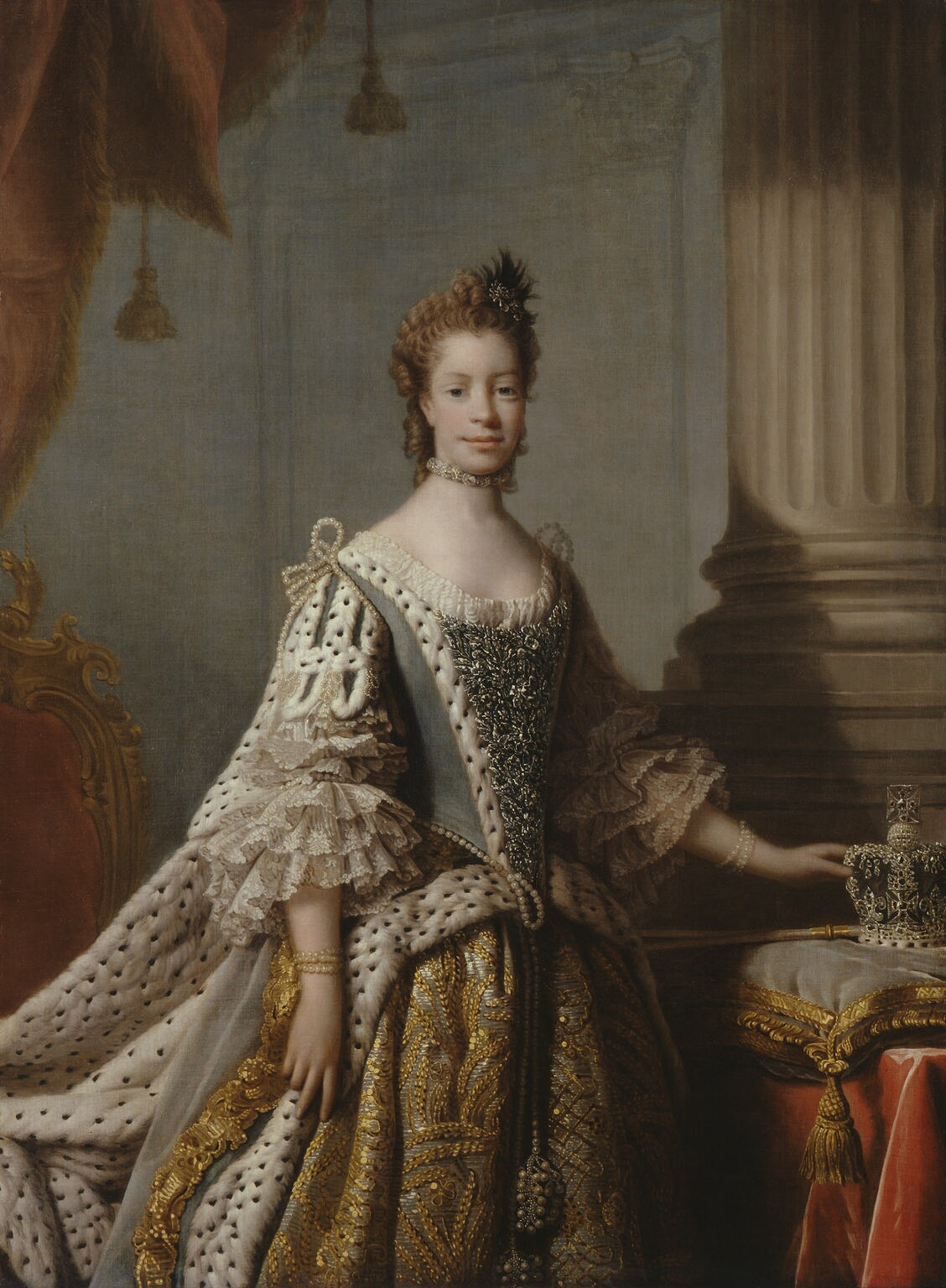
The historical Queen Charlotte of Mecklenburg-Strelitz c. 1762

The series was announced in May 2021, with Shonda Rhimes set as showrunner and writer. Rhimes also serves as executive producer with Betsy Beers and director Tom Verica. Anna O'Malley serves as producer. The series consists of 6 episodes. In April 2022, production designer Dave Arrowsmith was fired due to bullying allegations on set. In an interview for Netflix Tudum, the executive producer and screenwriter Verica talked about the creative process behind the series and why it was chosen to be based on the Charlotte Queen figure:

We’re very clear about this world and that this is not a history lesson. This is fiction inspired by fact. It’s very important to me that people understand that, because I’m telling the story of Queen Charlotte of Bridgerton, not of Queen Charlotte of England. [...] Many historians believe that Queen Charlotte was of mixed cultural heritage. We wanted to take that in a different direction than what the history books have said happened which was basically to bury that and not deal with it. We wanted to shine a light on that element. We asked, "What if society embraced those differences in diversity and elevated people of color to prominent positions and ranks?"; "The Great Experiment" [which didn’t happen in real-life England] allows us to reimagine what that world could have looked like if that part of Charlotte’s identity had been embraced.

— Tom Verica on Queen Charlotte

=== Casting ===
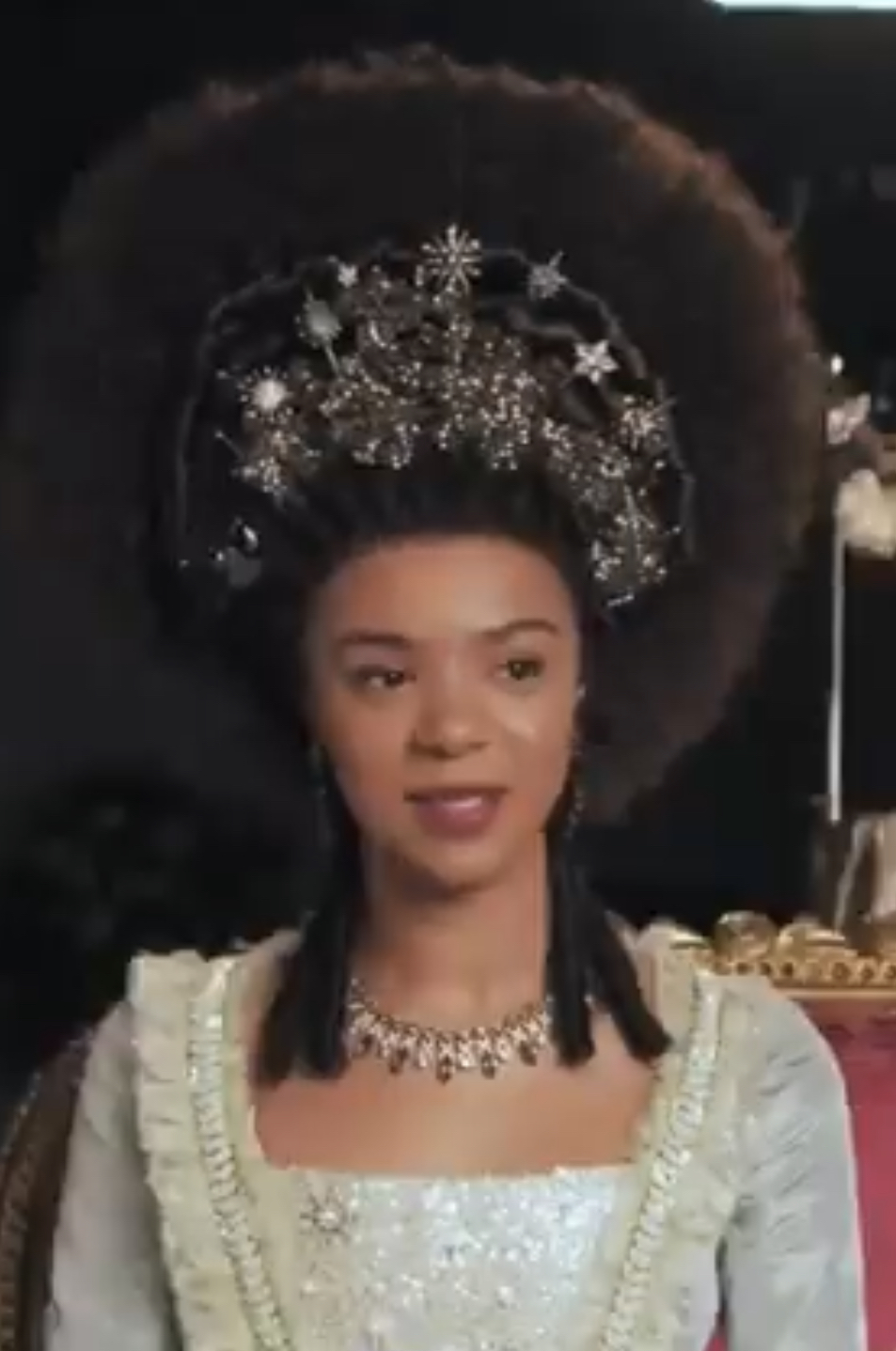
India Amarteifio as a young Queen Charlotte

On March 30, 2022, Golda Rosheuvel, Adjoa Andoh, Ruth Gemmell, and Hugh Sachs were announced to be reprising their roles from Bridgerton. India Amarteifio, Michelle Fairley, Corey Mylchreest, Arsema Thomas, Sam Clemmett, Richard Cunningham, Tunji Kasim, Rob Maloney, and Cyril Nri were also cast. In June 2022, Katie Brayben and Keir Charles were cast in recurring roles. One month later, Connie Jenkins-Grieg joined the cast as a young Violet Bridgerton.

=== Filming ===
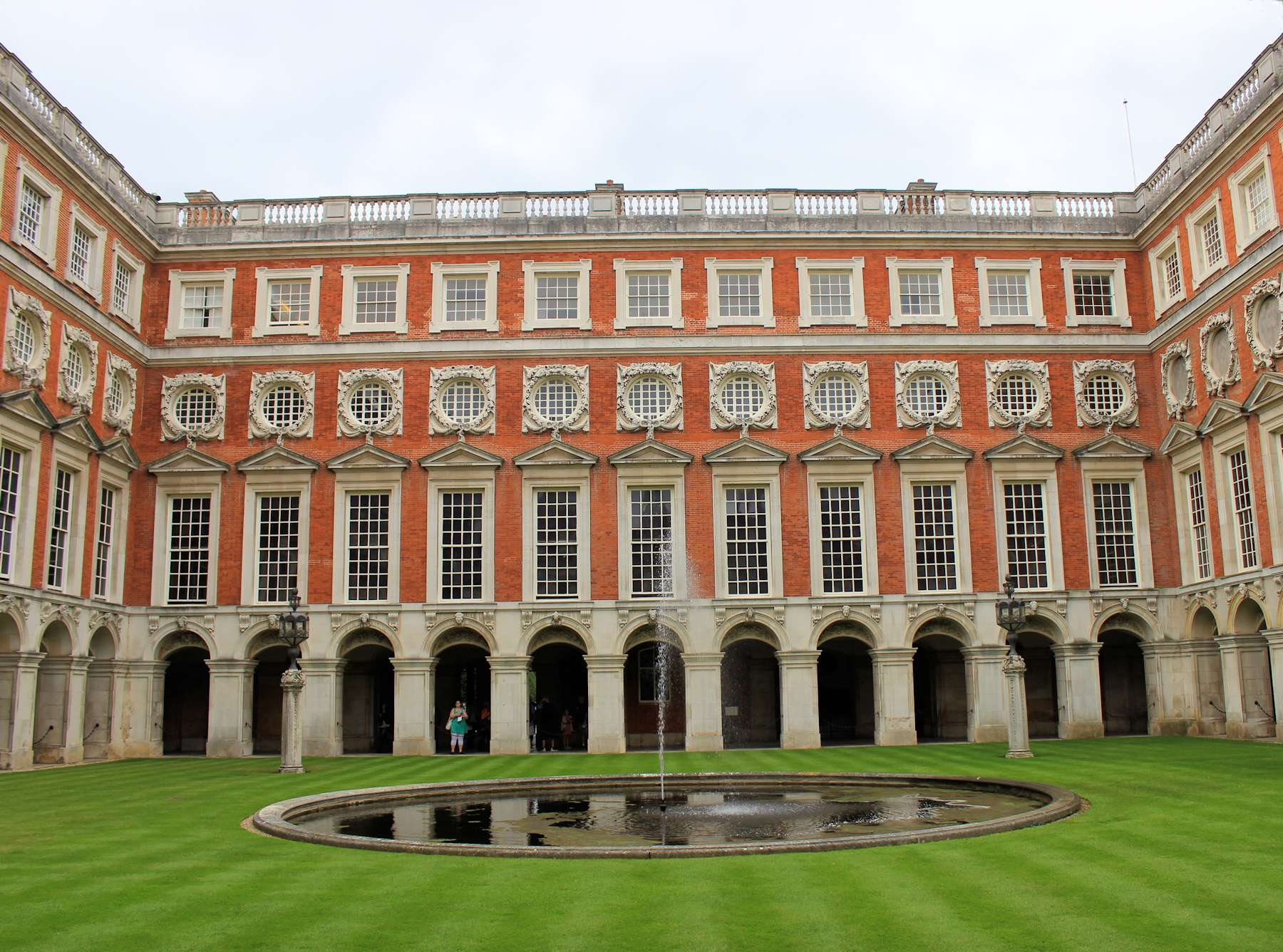
Hampton Court palace, used as a filming location for the series

The series was previously set to begin filming in January 2022; production began on February 6, 2022, under the working title Jewels, and was set to wrap in May 2022. Director Tom Verica confirmed filming had started by March 28, 2022. The series wrapped on August 30, 2022. The filming locations included Blenheim Palace, Belton House, Merton College, Hatfield House and Waddesdon Manor, as well as Hampton Court Palace.

=== Music ===
Kris Bowers, who scored both the first and second seasons of Bridgerton, also worked on two original soundtrack projects for the series through Sony Music. The first one, Queen Charlotte: A Bridgerton Story (Soundtrack from the Netflix Series), was supervised by Bowers, with co-production by Max Wrightson and co-writing of some tracks by Alec Sievern and Michael Dean Parsons. The second project, Queen Charlotte: A Bridgerton Story (Covers from the Netflix Series), provided for the reinterpretation in a classical music key of pop songs from Beyoncé, Alicia Keys, SZA, Dolly Parton and Whitney Houston discography. Keys song "If I Ain't Got You" was recorded with Queen Charlotte's Global Orchestra, a 70-piece orchestra of women of colour and Keys herself, and has been used as a soundtrack song.

== Release ==
Queen Charlotte: A Bridgerton Story was released on Netflix on May 4, 2023, consisting of six episodes.

== Reception ==
=== Viewership ===
In the first week after its premiere, Queen Charlotte: A Bridgerton Story debuted at number one in 91 countries, including the United States, the United Kingdom, Australia, India, South Africa and Canada, and the Netflix Global Weekly Top 10 ranking of the ten most-watched English-language TV series on the platform in seven days with a further 148.28 million viewing hours. It peaked in week two with 158.68 million hours of viewing, maintaining the top spot in the Global Weekly Top 10 in week three as well.

=== Critical response ===
On the review aggregator website Rotten Tomatoes, 94% of 80 critics' reviews are positive, with an average rating of 7.8/10. The website's consensus reads: "A resplendent romance between two of the most interesting characters in the Bridgerton saga, Queen Charlotte is a spin-off that arguably perfects the primary series' formula." Metacritic, which uses a weighted average, has assigned a score of 76 out of 100 based on 30 critics, indicating "generally favorable reviews".

Time ranked the series on The 5 Best New TV Shows of May 2023. Judy Berman of the same magazine wrote that the plot "It’s a neat explanation and one that works well thematically, if not historically" found out that "Rhimes’ reimagined 18th century England has much in common with the contemporary U.S. It's a multicultural society, but one that is in the midst of a painful transformation". Lucy Mangan of The Guardian gave 4 out of 5 stars, defining the series as a "gorgeous six-episode romp from Shondaland" and "a rare exception to the rule of prequels and will hopefully set many of its younger stars on the road to success" especially appreciating the acting of Amarteifio. Nicole Vassell of The Independent pointed out that "Queen Charlotte delivers everything a Bridgerton fan could want . . . with touches of social commentary that feel refreshing, rather than preachy".

The Hollywood Reporter's writer Angie Han found the story a "delectable romantic treat", writing that "Queen Charlotte is the tension between the cotton-candy fantasy that’s made Bridgerton so beloved with the thornier ground already laid out for the central couple by the core series" in which "the challenge ultimately yields a spinoff that’s richer and more complex than the flagship series". Lorraine Ali of Los Angeles Times wrote that "lighthearted romance and romps in the gilded bed still play starring roles, and the prequel offers plenty of splendid scenery", appointing that "there is finally a gay love affair in the 'Bridgerton' franchise, perhaps in response to criticisms that the series lacked a same-sex relationship, but the subplot does not feel engineered or obligatory. It naturally dovetails with all the other affairs of the heart". Alison Herman of Variety wrote that Queen Charlotte "offers an ideal metaphor for what the best spinoffs can do; [...] In its brevity, Queen Charlotte can strip down the broad ensemble of 'Bridgerton' into a more focused story". Inkoo Kang, writer of The New Yorker, appointed that "this counter-history is hardly convincing as a remedy to ingrained prejudice. [...] But this is also an alternate universe where eighteenth-century musicians play twenty-first-century pop hits and the reigning English monarch is toe-curlingly handsome, so let us feel free to exercise some suspension of disbelief".

Historian S. I. Martin, who specializes in Black British history, described the series as "an absurd take on Black history" and accused it of "inviting, or fomenting, the forgetting or overlooking" of the "time when Britain was the largest trader in human lives on the planet". Gretchen Gerzina, author of Britain's Black Past, fears that the series' race twisting "gives people a pass to say, 'Oh, it was all right. They didn’t suffer and they were wealthy.'"

=== Accolades ===
Year	Award	Category	Nominee	Result	Ref.
2023	7th Annual Black Reel Awards for Television	Outstanding Drama Series	Shonda Rhimes	Nominated	
2023	7th Annual Black Reel Awards for Television	Outstanding Writing, Drama Series	Shonda Rhimes	Won	
2023	7th Annual Black Reel Awards for Television	Outstanding Supporting Performance in a Drama Series	Adjoa Andoh	Nominated	
2023	7th Annual Black Reel Awards for Television	Outstanding Supporting Performance in a Drama Series	Golda Rosheuvel	Nominated	
2023	7th Annual Black Reel Awards for Television	Outstanding Supporting Performance in a Drama Series	Arsema Thomas	Nominated	
2023	7th Annual Black Reel Awards for Television	Outstanding Musical Score	Kris Bowers	Won	
2023	7th Annual Black Reel Awards for Television	Outstanding Original Song	"A Feeling I've Never Been" – Kris Bowers and Tayla Parx	Nominated	
2023	14th Hollywood Music in Media Awards	Best Main Title Theme – TV Show/Limited Series	Queen Charlotte: A Bridgerton Story – Kris Bowers	Nominated	
2024	75th Primetime Emmy Awards	Outstanding Period Costumes for a Series	Lyn Elizabeth Paolo, Laura Frecon, Jovana Gospavic, Alex Locke (for "Crown Jewels")	Nominated	
2024	75th Primetime Emmy Awards	Outstanding Period and/or Character Hairstyling	Nic Collins, Giorgio Galliero (for "Crown Jewels")	Won	
2024	75th Primetime Emmy Awards	Outstanding Character Voice-Over Performance	Julie Andrews (for "Honeymoon Bliss")	Nominated	
2024	3rd Astra TV Awards	Best Streaming Series, Drama	Queen Charlotte: A Bridgerton Story	Nominated	
2024	3rd Astra TV Awards	Best Actress in a Streaming Series, Drama	India Ria Amarteifio	Nominated	
2024	49th People's Choice Awards	The Bingeworthy Show of the Year	Queen Charlotte: A Bridgerton Story	Nominated	
2024	49th People's Choice Awards	The TV Performance of the Year	Adjoa Andoh	Nominated	
2024	35th GLAAD Media Awards	Outstanding Limited or Anthology Series	Queen Charlotte: A Bridgerton Story	Nominated	
2024	55th NAACP Image Awards	Outstanding Drama Series	Queen Charlotte: A Bridgerton Story	Won	
2024	55th NAACP Image Awards	Outstanding Actress in a Drama Series	India Ria Amarteifio	Won	
2024	55th NAACP Image Awards	Outstanding Actress in a Drama Series	Adjoa Andoh	Nominated	
2024	55th NAACP Image Awards	Outstanding Actress in a Drama Series	Arsema Thomas	Nominated	
2024	55th NAACP Image Awards	Outstanding Actress in a Drama Series	Golda Rosheuvel	Nominated	
2024	55th NAACP Image Awards	Outstanding Writing in a Dramatic Series	Shonda Rhimes	Nominated	
2024	76th Writers Guild of America Awards	Episodic Drama	Shonda Rhimes (for "Crown Jewels")	Nominated	
2024	25th BAFTA Craft Awards	Best Titles & Graphic Identity	Studio AKA	Nominated	
