= She Taught Love =

- Official poster
- Directed by: Nate Edwards
- Written by: Darrell Britt-Gibson
- Produced by: Sanjay M Sharma; Milan Chakraborty; Hadley Klein; Peter Van Auker
- Starring: Darrell Britt-Gibson; Taissa Farmiga; Arsema Thomas; D'Arcy Carden
- Cinematography: Justin Derry
- Edited by: Monica Salazar
- Music by: Esin Aydingoz
- Production companies: Andscape; Marginal Mediaworks
- Distributed by: Hulu; Disney+
- Release date: September 27, 2024
- Running time: 102 minutes
- Country: United States
- Language: English

She Taught Love is a 2024 American romantic drama film directed by Nate Edwards. It tells the story of an actor who goes on a self-destructive path and meets the love of his life at a department store. The film was released on Hulu on September 27, 2024, to positive reviews from critics.

== Plot ==
A guy, Frank, on a self-destructive path. A girl, Mali, with an expiration date. What a perfect time to meet and fall in love.

== Cast ==
- Darrell Britt-Gibson as Frank Cooper
- Arsema Thomas as Mali Waters
- Taissa Farmiga as Samantha Miron
- D'Arcy Carden as Laura Neil
- Treisa Gary as Brenda Waters
- Kevin Carroll as Barry Randle
- Alexander Hodge as Justin Chaun
- Angela E. Gibbs as Donna Cooper
- Aida Rodriguez as Gayle Nathenson
- Hayley Law as Candice
- Henri Esteve as Colin
- Edwin Lee Gibson as Kevin Waters
- La'Charles Trask as Deshawn
- Natasha Marc as Gina

== Production ==
=== Casting ===
In July 2022, it was announced that Darrell Britt-Gibson, Kirby Howell-Baptiste, and Taissa Farmiga would star in the film, with Britt-Gibson executive producing and having written the script. At a later date, Howell-Baptiste left the project and was replaced by Arsema Thomas.

=== Release ===
The first trailer for the film was released by People on August 27, 2024, a month before the film's release date, alongside exclusive first look images from the film.
