= Badland (2007 film) =

- Directed by: Francesco Lucente
- Screenplay by: Francesco Lucente
- Produced by: Olimpia Lucente; Jorg G. Neumann
- Starring: Jamie Draven; Grace Fulton; Vinessa Shaw; Chandra West; Joe Morton
- Cinematography: Carlo Varini
- Edited by: Francesco Lucente
- Music by: Ludek Drizhal
- Distributed by: Copex Distribution
- Release date: November 30, 2007 (limited)
- Running time: 165 minutes
- Countries: United States; Germany
- Language: English

Badland is a 2007 German-American drama film written and directed by Francesco Lucente and starring Jamie Draven, Grace Fulton, Vinessa Shaw, Chandra West and Joe Morton.

== Plot summary ==
The protagonist, named Jerry, is a veteran from the Iraq War living presumably in Idaho. He then goes on a killing spree after discovering that his wife has been withholding money from him.

== Cast ==
- Jamie Draven as Jerry Rice
- Grace Fulton as Celina Rice
- Vinessa Shaw as Nora Rice
- Chandra West as Oli Danilou
- Joe Morton as Max Astin
- Tom Carey as Louie
- Patrick Richards as Alex
- Jake Church as Stevie
- Louie Campbell as Ray

== Release ==
The film had a limited theatrical release on November 30, 2007.

== Reception ==
The film has a 16% rating on Rotten Tomatoes based on 19 reviews.

Marjorie Baumgarten of The Austin Chronicle awarded the film one star out of five. Rob Humanick of Slant Magazine awarded the film one and a half stars out of four and wrote, "Until the mess in the Middle East has found its way to a resolution, we can continue to expect films like Badland as part of the collateral damage in the War on Terror." Robert Koehler of Variety gave the film a negative review and wrote, "The raw material would seem to be in place for a strong, moving contemporary tragedy, but scene after endless scene fails to come to life." The Associated Press also gave the film a negative review: "When the picture gets around to its calculated socko ending, the viewer has long been pummeled into a state of numbness."

Eric Monder of Film Journal International gave the film a positive review and wrote, "Badland takes a step in the right direction by attempting to understand the aftermath of war." Matt Zoller Seitz of The New York Times also gave the film a positive review, calling it "mawkish yet weirdly mesmerizing." Kevin Thomas of the Los Angeles Times also gave the film a positive review and wrote, "Expertly constructed and beautifully photographed, Badland easily sustains its 160-minute running time, and the portrayals of Draven, a British actor, and 9-year-old Fulton can stand alongside the year’s best."
