= Christian Mercuri =

American film producer

- Born: United States
- Occupations: Film executive; Film producer
- Years active: 2002–present

Christian Mercuri is an American film executive and producer known for his work in international film sales, financing, and production. He is the founder and chairman of Capstone, whose operations are divided between Capstone Studios and Capstone Global.

== Career ==
Mercuri joined Nu Image/Millennium Films in 2002, initially as an office manager before on the production side with company co-founder Avi Lerner and later moving into international sales. In November 2007, he became vice-president of international sales at the company, where he represented the company's slate at international film markets, including the European Film Market and Cannes.

In 2011, Mercuri joined Red Granite Pictures as part of a group of executives recruited from Millennium Films/Nu Image, alongside Danny Dimbort and production executive Joe Gatta. He served as co-president of Red Granite Pictures' international division, where he oversaw greenlight process and distribution for films including The Wolf of Wall Street and Dumb and Dumber To.

In April 2017, Mercuri founded Capstone Group, a Beverly Hills-based production and international sales company. In September 2022, Mercuri stated that Capstone had restructured its operations into two divisions: Capstone Studios, focused on production and financing, and Capstone Global, handling international sales.

Mercuri has also served as a producer and executive producer on numerous films developed through Capstone, including Vanquish (2020), Fall (2022), The Estate (2022), Breathe (2022), Black Lotus (2022), Sympathy for the Devil (2023), Kandahar (2023), Silent Night (2023), and Boy Kills World (2023).

In 2025, Mercuri was an executive producer on Coyotes, a horror-comedy directed by Colin Minihan. The film premiered at Fantastic Fest and was released theatrically on October 3, 2025, by Aura Entertainment.

Mercuri was the financier and producer of Obsession, the horror film directed by Curry Barker, which has received positive critical reception and strong box office performance following its theatrical release in 2026.

== Filmography ==
=== Producer ===
Year	Title	Role
2022	She Is Love	Producer
2022	Fall	Producer
2023	Silent Night	Producer
2023	Kandahar	Producer
2023	Black Lotus	Producer
2024	Don't Move	Producer
2024	Breathe	Producer
2025	Wildcat	Producer
2025	Trap House	Producer
2025	Obsession	Producer
2026	Fall 2: Deadpoint	Producer

=== Executive producer ===
Year	Title	Role
2011	Friends with Kids	Executive producer
2011	Elephant White	Executive producer
2013	Out of the Furnace	Executive producer
2013	Horns	Executive producer
2013	A Case of You	Executive producer
2014	Dumb and Dumber To	Executive producer
2014	Dying of the Light	Executive producer
2017	Papillon	Executive producer
2017	The Outcasts	Executive producer
2019	The Courier	Executive producer
2019	The Kid	Executive producer
2020	Rogue	Executive producer
2020	Bill & Ted Face the Music	Executive producer
2020	Force of Nature	Executive producer
2020	The Postcard Killings	Executive producer
2020	Four Good Days	Executive producer
2020	Come Away	Executive producer
2021	National Champions	Executive producer
2021	The Guilty	Executive producer
2021	Endangered Species	Executive producer
2021	Vanquish	Executive producer
2022	The Estate	Executive producer
2022	Prisoner's Daughter	Executive producer
2022	Padre Pio	Executive producer
2022	A Day to Die	Executive producer
2022	Shattered	Executive producer
2023	Dangerous Waters	Executive producer
2023	Boy Kills World	Executive producer
2023	Sympathy for the Devil	Executive producer
2023	Spinning Gold	Executive producer
2023	Manodrome	Executive producer
2023	The Old Way	Executive producer
2024	Riff Raff	Executive producer
2025	Under the Stars	Executive producer
