= Ric Roman Waugh =

American film director, writer, producer (born 1968)

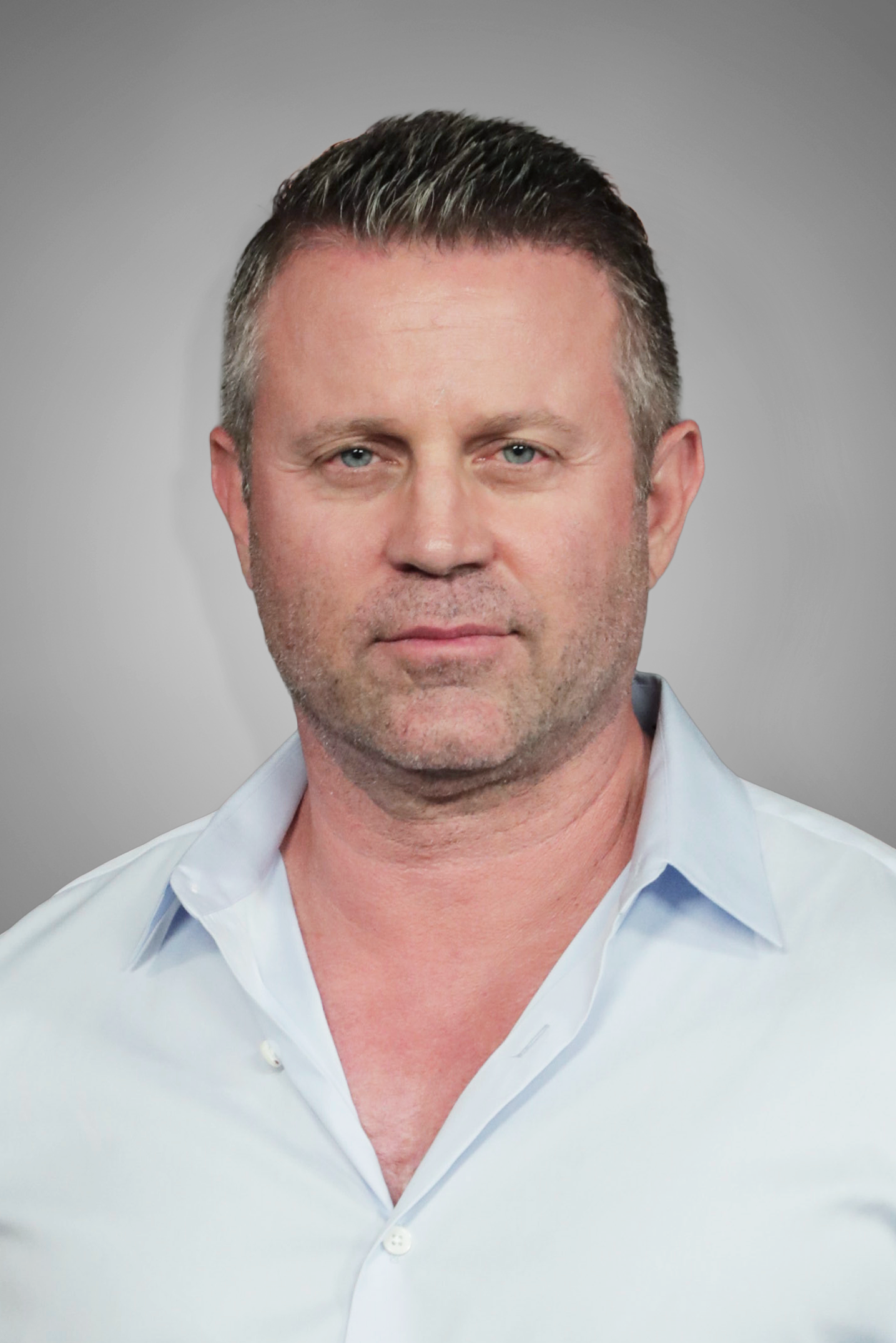
- Waugh in 2026
- Born: February 20, 1968 (age 58); Los Angeles, California, U.S.
- Occupations: Actor, director, writer, producer
- Years active: 1984–present
- Spouse: Tanya Ballinger (m. 2005)
- Children: 2
- Father: Fred Waugh (father)
- Relatives: Scott Waugh (brother)

Ric Roman Waugh (born February 20, 1968) is an American filmmaker and former stuntman. He is known for his films in Felon (2008), Snitch (2013), and Shot Caller (2017). He is the older brother of director Scott Waugh and son of stuntman Fred Waugh.

== Career ==
Waugh worked as a stunt performer in the 1980s and 1990s, appearing in films such as Universal Soldier, The Last of the Mohicans, Last Action Hero, Hard Target, The Crow, Gone in 60 Seconds, Lethal Weapon 2, Days of Thunder, and The One. He also worked as an actor in Kuffs (1992) starring Christian Slater and Milla Jovovich.

His first directorial film was In the Shadows (2001), starring James Caan, Matthew Modine, Joey Lauren Adams, and Cuba Gooding Jr. He later directed Felon (2008), starring Val Kilmer. Waugh worked with actor Dwayne Johnson in Snitch (2013) and was in talks to direct the disaster film Deepwater Horizon in 2012, before changes occurred in the film's development process. In 2019, Waugh went on to solidify his reputation in contemporary action cinema with the third installment of the Has Fallen film series, Angel Has Fallen.

He later directed a trio of films starring Gerard Butler, including the global disaster film Greenland (2020) the action-drama Kandahar (2023), and Greenland 2: Migration (2026).

Waugh teamed up with Jason Statham in his latest film, Shelter, a thriller about a man whose life unravels after rescuing a drowning girl. Stephen King gave the film glowing reviews, calling it a perfect movie.

Waugh recently launched CineMachine Media Works, now under its first-look deal with Lionsgate. CineMachine is dedicated to producing elevated genre films rooted in socially resonant themes.

== Filmography ==
| Year | Title | Director | Writer | Producer | Notes |
|---|---|---|---|---|---|
| 2001 | In the Shadows | Yes | Yes | No | |
| 2003 | Biker Boyz | Second unit | No | No | |
| 2008 | Felon | Yes | Yes | No | |
| 2013 | Snitch | Yes | Yes | No | |
| 2015 | That Which I Love Destroys Me | Yes | No | Yes | Documentary |
| 2017 | Shot Caller | Yes | Yes | Yes | |
| 2019 | Angel Has Fallen | Yes | Yes | No | |
| 2020 | Greenland | Yes | No | No | |
| 2021 | National Champions | Yes | No | No | |
| 2023 | Kandahar | Yes | No | No | |
| 2026 | Greenland 2: Migration | Yes | No | Yes | |
| 2026 | Shelter | Yes | No | No | |
| TBA | Night Has Fallen † | Yes | Yes | No | |

=== Stunts ===
| Year | Title | Notes |
|---|---|---|
| 1989 | Tango & Cash | Uncredited |
| 1990 | Days of Thunder | as Ric Waugh |
| 1991 | Hook | as Ric Waugh |
| 1992 | Kuffs | as Ric Waugh, Assistant stunt coordinator |
| 1992 | The Last of the Mohicans | as Ric Waugh |
| 1993 | Last Action Hero | |
| 1998 | From the Earth to the Moon | Episode: "Apollo One" |
| 2000 | Gone in 60 Seconds | as Ric Waugh |
