= Arsema Thomas =

American actress

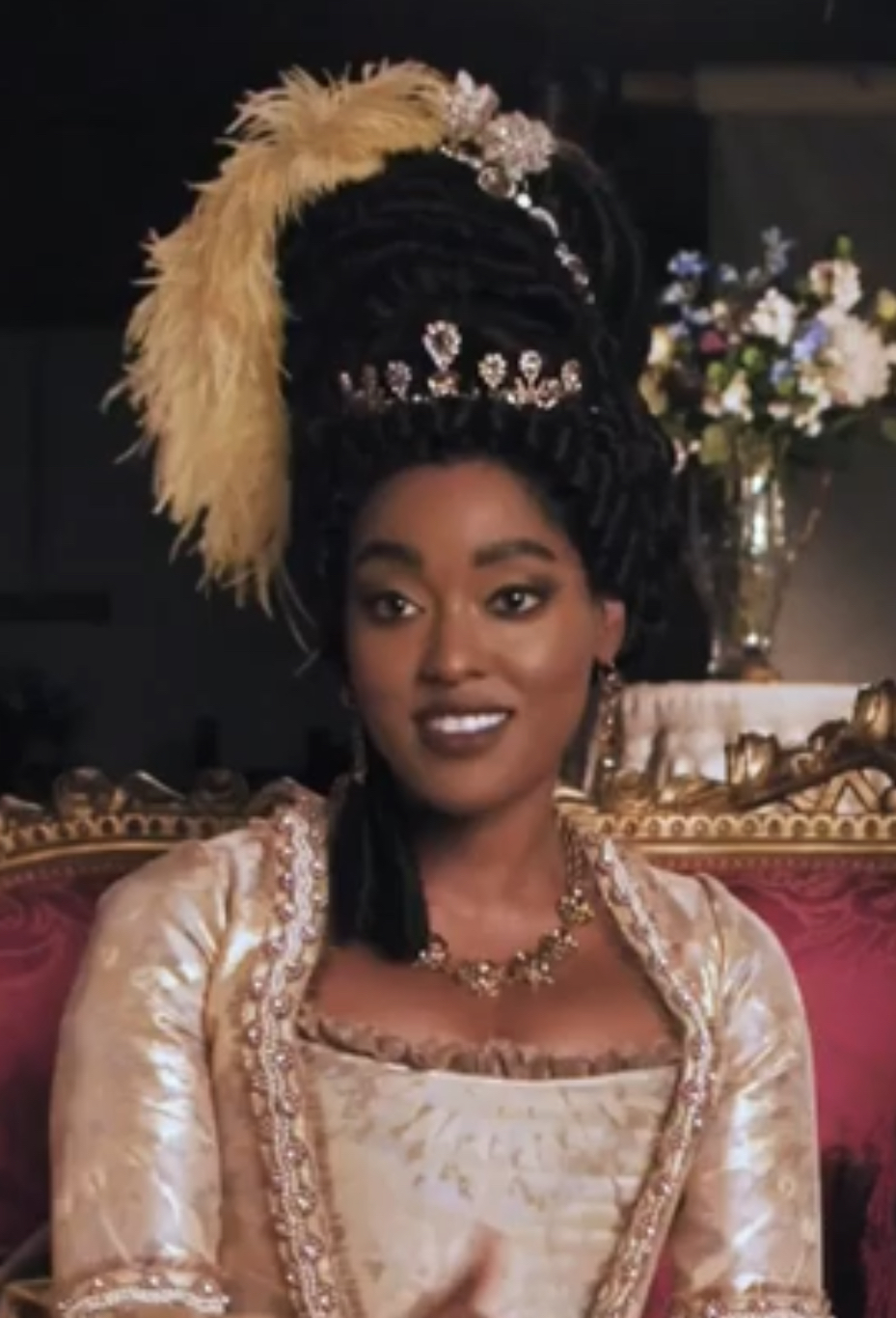
- Thomas behind the scenes of Queen Charlotte
- Born: June 19, 1994 (age 32); Atlanta, Georgia, U.S.
- Education: Carnegie Mellon University; Yale University; LAMDA
- Occupation: Actor
- Years active: 2020–present
- Height: 165 cm (5 ft 5 in)

Arséma Angela Adeoluwayemi Hamera Thomas (born June 19, 1994) is an American actress. On television, she played young Lady Agatha Danbury in the Netflix period drama Queen Charlotte: A Bridgerton Story (2023). Her films include She Taught Love (2024).

== Early life and education ==
Thomas was born in Atlanta, Georgia to a Yoruba Nigerian father and an Ethiopian mother, both diplomats, and moved to Kampala, Uganda at two weeks old. She lived in multiple countries growing up, including Tanzania, Benin, Togo and Kenya, as well as the Comoros and India. She speaks English, French, Spanish, Yoruba, Amharic, and American Sign Language. Given the nature of her parents' work, Thomas grew up reading and discussing essential works by Chinua Achebe and Wole Soyinka and listening to Fela Kuti, influencing her political and social activism today.

Thomas completed high school at Linden Hall (Lancaster, Pennsylvania, USA), where she was on the tennis team, soccer team, drama club, debate team, student council, and National Honor Society. She initially planned to pursue a "safe career" and go into global public health, graduating with a Bachelor of Arts in Biophysics from Carnegie Mellon University in 2016 and then a Master's of Public Health (MPH) (studying Health Policy with a concentration in Global Health) from Yale University School of Public Health (YSPH) in 2018 with the goal of promoting health equity. While at the former, Thomas was a member of the Beta Nu chapter of Delta Gamma fraternity.

Thomas worked in a maternal and child mobile health clinic in Northern Kenya and the Kakumah Refugee Camp on the Kenya-Sudan border. She gave a TEDxYale talk titled "Charity, One Hell of a Drug" addressing the issues of donor aid dependency during the second year of her MPH. Thomas is the founder of the women-empowerment health app Enki (stylised as enki) which helped supply female condoms to combat HIV/AIDS. Thomas is also cofounder of a startup called Mosaic, which is an online platform for refugees to sell goods around the world and in turn provide for themselves and their families. Thomas also worked as an associate of the United Nations Population Fund, was a fellow of the Global Health Justice Partnership at Yale University, and a board member of the Adebisi Babatunde Thomas Entrepreneurship Institute (ABTEI) in Nairobi, Kenya. Thomas also volunteered with Habitat for Humanity and International Refugee and Immigration Services (IRIS).

After losing her father in 2016 to Lou Gehrig's disease, Thomas decided to pursue acting. She took short courses at the American Academy of Dramatic Arts, the Cours Florent in Paris, and the Royal Academy of Dramatic Art (RADA) in London. She began attending the London Academy of Music and Dramatic Art (LAMDA), but put her studies on pause when she was cast in Queen Charlotte.

== Acting career ==
In 2020, Thomas participated in online Shakespeare readings with the Market Theatre in Johannesburg. After signing with her agent Gary O'Sullivan of Accelerate Management in South Africa and London, Thomas landed her debut feature film role as Rebecca in Redeeming Love, which premiered in 2022.

Also in 2022, it was announced Thomas would play young Lady Agatha Danbury (played by Adjoa Andoh later in life) in the Netflix period drama prequel Queen Charlotte: A Bridgerton Story, which premiered in May 2023. Thomas learned she had been cast while working as a butcher's assistant in Notting Hill. In preparation for the role of young Lady Danbury, Thomas read anti-racist and feminist literature by authors such as bell hooks, Angela Y. Davis, Zora Neale Hurston, and Assata Shakur, as well as drawing insight from her grandmother, who had an arranged marriage at the age of 7. Thomas also put on an English accent throughout the audition process.

Thomas is set to star opposite Freddy Carter in Poor Clare at the Orange Tree Theatre in Richmond.

== Personal life ==
In August 2017, Thomas said her favorite book was Between the World and Me by Ta-Nehisi Coates, favorite shows were Chewing Gum and Rick and Morty, and three things she couldn't live without would be “a pen, chapstick, and music (any genre).”

According to a May 2023 interview, Thomas uses the pronouns she/they. In interviews for the Queen Charlotte: A Bridgerton Story press tour, Thomas lists Ice Spice, Flo Milli, Megan Thee Stallion, and Little Simz as her favorite female rappers. Thomas also listens to Nina Simone, Diana Ross, Billie Holiday, and FLO.

== Filmography ==
=== Film ===
| Year | Title | Role | Notes |
|---|---|---|---|
| 2018 | Nightwatcher | Leila | Short film |
| 2022 | Redeeming Love | Rebecca | |
| 2024 | She Taught Love | Mali | |
| 2026 | Fall 2: Deadpoint | Luce / Billie | |

=== Television ===
| Year | Title | Role | Notes |
|---|---|---|---|
| 2021 | One Touch | Christie | Pilot |
| 2023 | Queen Charlotte: A Bridgerton Story | Young Agatha Danbury | Main role; 6 Episodes |
