= Tom Brittney =

English actor (born 1990)

- Born: Tom Christopher Brittney; 26 October 1990 (age 36); Gravesend, Kent, England
- Education: Royal Central School of Speech and Drama
- Occupation: Actor
- Years active: 2013–present

Tom Christopher Brittney (born 26 October 1990) is an English actor who is best known for playing the Reverend Will Davenport in Grantchester (2019–2023).

== Early life ==
Tom Brittney was born in Gravesend, Kent on 26 October 1990. He moved to Devon when he was 12, where his mother taught drama and where he attended Colyton Grammar School. Brittney trained at the Royal Central School of Speech and Drama in London.

His mother is the author Lynn Brittney. He has a younger sister, Rose, who is a trained dancer.

== Career ==
Brittney's first TV appearance was in the daytime soap opera Doctors in 2013. The following year, he joined the recurring cast of historical/fantasy series Outlander, in which he played Lieutenant Jeremy Foster, one of Black Jack Randall's men. He also appeared briefly in an episode of the BBC TV series Call the Midwife, and a short film called The Unknowns. In 2015, he was cast as DS Ken Howells in the crime drama The Five, written by U.S. crime author Harlan Coben. He also appeared as a recurring character in the third season of The Syndicate, playing Tyler Mitchell, and played Roger Lockwood in the TV series UnReal. In the same year, he played Greg in Humans. He appeared in Film Stars Don't Die in Liverpool as Tim.

In 2017, he appeared as David in X Company, and played Conrad Habicht in an episode of Genius. In June 2018, Brittney joined the cast of the ITV crime drama Grantchester as the Reverend Will Davenport, the new lead character. Brittney starred as Billy in the drama Make Me Famous in 2020. Written by Reggie Yates and directed by Peter King, the film explores the impact and consequences of fast fame on reality TV participants and their close friends and families.

In 2023, Brittney auditioned for the role of Superman in James Gunn's Superman, becoming one of three finalists for the part, alongside Nicholas Hoult and David Corenswet, with Corenswet ultimately getting the role.

== Personal life ==
Brittney lives in London. One of his hobbies is photography.

On acting, Brittney revealed that he had always wanted to be an actor: "having that ambition makes it all the more painful when it doesn't come to reality. I didn't have a plan B [...] luckily, I'd like to think it's working out, but it's a tough journey, I think putting all your love and hope into your ambition."

Brittney was diagnosed with body dysmorphia. In 2020, he revealed: "I used to take off days from school, because I just hated the way that I looked [...] I'm very insecure with the way that I look and I'll beat myself up about performances."

In 2019, he seemingly considered himself an atheist, saying, "I wish I believed in heaven and wish I believed in God [...] It would mean there's something after death, and I would see the people I love again. But I know in my heart that's not true. All power to people who do." However, he expressed an appreciation for general spirituality and hinted that it wasn't actually God he didn't believe in: "I love the idea of spirituality [...] I think that's separate from religion. It's organized religion I'm not a believer in. I just disagree with organized religion being used to oppress people - that's the thing."

In October 2026, Brittney began dating model and podcast host Clo Gascoigne.

== Filmography ==
=== Film ===
Year	Title	Role	Notes
2014	The Unknowns	Laurence	Short
2017	Film Stars Don't Die in Liverpool	Tim	
2020	Greyhound	Lt. Watson	
2025	Back in Action	Dylan	
2026	Black Box	Jeremy	
2026	Fall 2: Deadpoint	Jon Platt	

=== Television ===
Year	Title	Role	Notes
2013	Doctors	Ollie Cox	Episode: "A Different Page"
2014	Call the Midwife	Jack Rawle	Episode #3.7
2014	Pramface	Ben	Episode: "Enchanted Picnic"
2014	Outlander	Lt. Jeremy Foster	3 episodes
2014	Casualty	Preston Starky	Episode: When Nothing Else Matters
2015, 2018	Unreal	Roger Lockwood	6 episodes
2015	The Syndicate	Tyler Mitchell	3 episodes
2015	Humans	Greg	Episode #1.3
2016	The Five	Ken Howells	8 episodes
2016	Spark	Aiden Stockton	
2017	X Company	David	3 episodes
2017	Genius	Conrad Habicht	Episode: "Einstein: Chapter Three"
2019–2024	Grantchester	Will Davenport	Lead; 34 episodes
2019	Heartstrings	Younger Logan Cantrell	Episode: "Sugar Hill"
2020	Make Me Famous	Billy	Television film
2021	Invasion	Paulson	Episode: "Crash"
2026	The Westies	James “Jimmy” Roarke	Main cast
