= Tim Despic =

Canadian-British composer (born 1978)

Tim Despic (born November 22, 1978) is a Canadian-born London-based British composer. His style of composition has been described as ‘moody and evocative’ (Variety, 2009).

== Life and career ==
Tim Despic was born in Montreal, Quebec, and at age three his family immigrated to the United Kingdom. He was educated at the University of Bath where he graduated with an honours degree in Politics and Economics. He been classically trained from a young age as a pianist and returned to university for a master's degree in Creative Music Technology from Newcastle University. He is a multi-instrumentalist specialises in traditional orchestrations fuzed with contemporary acoustic and electronic soundscapes. He cites Bernard Herman, Danny Elfman and Scott Walker amongst his main influences.

In 2005 along with fellow composer and collaborator James Edward Barker he co-founded Veneration Music Ltd with a UK-based music production company, co-ordinating and composing scores for feature films. His first feature, The Best Man was an $11 m romantic comedy starring Seth Green, Stuart Townsend, Amy Smart and Simon Callow and was directed by Shooting Fish director Stefan Schwartz. He then went on to work with veteran director Robert Young, known for his comedies such as Fierce Creatures, the sequel to A Fish Called Wanda. In 2007, he scored the $7 m British ITV television production, The History of Mr Polly, starring Lee Evans, and the DVD–BBC release of Jim Threapleton's Extraordinary Rendition, starring Andy Serkis and Omar Berdouni. The film received critical acclaim and was nominated for awards or screened at a number of festivals including the British Independent Film Awards, Locarno and Edinburgh Film Festivals.

In 2007 he composed the score for Ashley Judd's role as a manic depressive in the Sundance selected Helen, directed by the critically acclaimed Sandra Nettelbeck of Mostly Martha. The score, described by Variety magazine as ‘moody and evocative’, also featured cello performed by the Grammy Award-winning David Darling. He has also worked in tandem with the Relentless energy drink's company as an additional composer to score two features, "Powers of Three" and the groundbreaking – "Lives of the Artists" featuring Gallows and world-renowned snowboarder Xavier de Le Rue.

In 2012 he formed the London-based indie band Go Tell The Eskimo who within months were signed by Jim Roach (Salmon Fishing in the Yemen, The Internship) to US based indie label Red Parade and their subsequent recordings secured them a publishing deal with the Los Angeles-based Secret Road Music Services. With them he went on to write music for various US network television spots including HBO's The Office, E!'s The Royals, NBC's Winter Olympics campaign, the 2015 Super Bowl halftime commercial spot for Redfin, ABC's Switched at Birth, Mixology, Chasing Life, Franklin and Bash and many more.

In 2013-14 Despic signed a management deal with the American music industry executive and artist manager Justin Goldberg (Rage Against the Machine, Willie Nelson, Dave Grohl), formerly of Sony Music Entertainment, Red Light Management and Razor & Tie, to be managed by Measurement Arts.

2015 he scored Lionsgate feature length thriller Heist (dir Scott Mann) starring Robert De Niro, Kate Bosworth and Dave Baustista, along with co-composer James Edward Barker. This was followed up with another Lionsgate thriller Precious Cargo (dir Max Adams) starring Bruce Willis.

In May 2017 the record label Filmtrax released the compilation album Filmtracks; The Composer's Collection, featuring compositions by Despic along with Academy Award-winning composers Atticus Ross and Gustavo Santaolalla as well as Grammy winner Lorne Balfe.

In June 2017 Despic signed with Hollywood composer agency Evolution Music Partners is a talent agency that represents an elite group of composers, songwriters and recording artists composing music for film and TV including the hit series Empire, Orphan Black, Hannibal, Dexter, Orange Is The New Black, Mozart Is The Jungle, Penny Dreadful and many more.

2017 also saw him score the feature films Return of the Footsoldier 3 and the remake of the 1949 classic suspense mystery Dead on Arrival which went on to be nominated for the 2017 ARPA International Film Festival for Best Screenplay, Best Director and Best Feature Film. In November 2017 it was announced that Despic and James Edward Barker would be composing and producing the score for the thriller Final Score starring Pierce Brosnan and David Bautista. He composed the music for three of Denny's US nationwide TV commercial campaigns including a reworking of Tchaikovsky's ‘The Nutcracker’ for the 2017 holiday season commercial campaign, as well as composing and producing music for the trailer of the movie Life starring Jake Gyllenhaal and Ryan Reynolds.

In 2019 it was announced that Tim Despic will be composing the score for The Courier (2020) starring Gary Oldman and Olga Kurylenko along with producer and collaborator James Edward Barker.

== Filmography ==
- The Best Man (2005)
- Bye Bye Harry (2006)
- The Chaos Theory (2006)
- Pocket Thief (2006)
- Dog's Mercury (2006)
- The History of Mr. Polly (2007)
- Extraordinary Rendition (2007)
- Reverb (2008)
- Helen (2009)
- Powers of Three (2009)
- Lives of the Artists (2009)
- The Betty Driver Story (2011)
- Great British Hairdresser (2011)
- Penguins (2012)
- Adventures of the Penguin King (2012)
- The Elves and the Poomaker (2013)
- Heist (2015)
- Lenni Lenni (2016)
- Precious Cargo (2016)
- Rise of the Footsoldier 3: The Pat Tate Story (2017)
- Dead On Arrival (2017)
- Final Score (2017)
- The Courier (2019)
- The Atomic Dream (2022)
- Fall (2022)

== Awards ==
- IndieFest Film Awards Best Original Score

== Nominations ==
- Tokyo Shorts Best Original Score

== Televisionography ==
- HBO's The Office (U.S. TV series) (Steve Carell, Rainn Wilson)
- Amazon Video's All Or Nothing
- Amazon Video's The Grand Tour
- E!'s The Royals
- Sky 3D's The Penguin King (David Attenborough)
- NBC's Winter Olympics campaign
- ABC's Switched At Birth, Mixology and Chasing Life
- National Geographic's Rocket City Rednecks
- TLC's Four Weddings
- Channel 4s The Great British Hairdresser

== Musicology ==
Television commercial campaigns

- Shell
- Ralph Lauren
- HSBC
- Wilkinson Sword
- Sudafed
- Heinz
- Ford European car commercial campaign
- Redfin
- Denny's
- Nissan

Commissions

- Vodafone
- Audi
- Kellogg’s
- Guinness
- Dove
- O2
