= Final Score (2018 film) =

- Film poster
- Directed by: Scott Mann
- Screenplay by: David T. Lynch; Keith Lynch; Jonathan Frank
- Produced by: Dave Bautista; Wayne Marc Godfrey; Marc Goldberg; Robert Jones; Jonathan Meisner
- Starring: Dave Bautista; Pierce Brosnan; Ray Stevenson; Alexandra Dinu; Ralph Brown; Julian Cheung; Lara Peake; Amit Shah; Trevor Poole
- Cinematography: Emil Topuzov
- Edited by: Robert Hall
- Music by: James Edward Barker; Tim Despic
- Production companies: Signature Films; The Fyzz Facility; Ingenious Media; Highland Film Group; Drybake Productions
- Distributed by: Sky Cinema; Altitude Film Distribution
- Release date: September 7, 2018
- Running time: 104 minutes
- Country: United Kingdom
- Languages: English; Russian
- Budget: $20 million
- Box office: $1.5 million (select territories)

Final Score is a 2018 British action thriller film directed by Scott Mann and written by David T. Lynch and Keith Lynch, starring Dave Bautista, Ray Stevenson and Pierce Brosnan. The plot sees a former soldier fight separatists from a fictional Russian republic, who threatens to blow up a packed association football stadium and kill his teenage protégée, unless an elusive spectator is turned over to them before the game ends.

== Plot ==
Brothers Arkady and Dimitri Belav have led the revolution in the Russian region of Sakovya for independence. The revolution ultimately leads to Dimitri being killed in an airstrike and Arkady being captured, ending the revolution. After several years, Arkady and his men believe that Dimitri has faked his death, so they torture a man for information on where Dimitri is hiding in London. Meanwhile, in London, former US military soldier Michael Knox visits his late best friend's house to attend the West Ham United football game with his niece, Danni. He had previously served in Afghanistan in an attack team alongside his best friend (who he explains "was like a brother") and was the only survivor of their last mission. Danni is grounded by her mother for delinquent behaviour, but Knox manages to fix the situation, and her mother gives her consent for Knox to take Danni to the football match.

Arriving at the West Ham stadium, Upton Park, Danni expresses her frustration about her dad's death. Knox goes to get them both hot dogs, at which point Danni gets a text from a boy she fancies and decides to join him at his seat. Meanwhile, Arkady and his mercenaries covertly infiltrate the stadium, take over the control room, and initiate a lockdown of the entire stadium. Taking Superintendent Steve Thompson hostage, Arkady threatens Thompson into cooperating by threatening his family. Arkady then has his men blow up all transmission towers across the city to ensure that no communication will be made outside the stadium. Discovering Danni is missing from her seat, Knox seeks help from the cheeky stadium guard, Faisal Khan. Faisal reluctantly assists Knox to the control room. On their way, they run into one of Arkady's men posing as a guard near the lift, who ultimately attacks them, resulting in Knox killing him. Knox finds C-4 explosives in Andrei's jacket. He then uses the only working walkie-talkie to call the police about the situation, but Chief Commander Daniel Steed does not believe him and hangs up. After he kills two other men, Vlad and Anton, Knox brings the latter's body to a balcony and throws him down, smashing into concession stands and thereby summoning the police. Seeing this, Arkady and the other mercenaries infiltrate the news studio and kill the crew. Arkady forces a reporter to read a statement at gunpoint, demanding Dimitri's location, or they will blow up the stadium. As he finishes the statement, Arkady kills the reporter and two others on live television, which Danni's mum sees and prompts her to leave for the stadium. Steed is approached by Agent Cho, who explains that Dimitri fled Russia undercover, underwent plastic surgery, and was given amnesty in London. Cho says that he cannot meet the demands, as handing Dimitri to Arkady will plunge the entire Russian region into chaos, endangering millions. Arkady's team learns the background of Knox and Danni, and they decide to take Danni hostage. Hearing them summoning Danni over the speaker, Knox rescues her with help from Faisal.

Because Thompson's team failed to capture Danni, Arkady executes him. Knox, Faisal, and Danni ultimately discover the C4 explosives planted below the control room, and Knox alerts Steed about it. Given the urgency of the situation, Knox asks Cho to give him Dimitri's location in the stadium, so he can take him to an extraction point himself. In exchange, he demands that Danni be exfiltrated with Dimitri. On his way, Knox encounters and fights Tatiana, ultimately escaping and finding Dimitri. Meanwhile, Tatiana takes Danni hostage and knocks Faisal unconscious. Knox fights more men and gets to the extraction point, but is reluctant to let go of Dimitri, as the latter is his only bargaining chip to get Danni back. In response, Cho has his men shoot at Dimitri to ensure he is not captured by Arkady. However, the incoming mercenaries fend off the helicopter. After they threaten Danni, Knox agrees to hand over Dimitri in exchange for her. Steed berates Cho for risking the lives of innocent people and takes control of the situation. A helicopter comes back and kills most of the other mercenaries, but Dimitri and Danni are captured. After Knox struggles with Tatiana, they both fall from a higher point in the stadium, and she is fatally impaled by a pipe. Knox had managed to get and keep hold of the kill switch, but realizes it is fake; before dying, Tatiana explains that the bomb will blow up 90 minutes into the match no matter what.

When Dimitri reunites with Arkady, Arkady vows to start the revolution again if Dimitri proves his loyalty by shooting Danni. But unwilling to let Arkady's madness destroy the region with another revolution, Dimitri shoots himself. With just a few minutes left, Faisal struggles to evacuate the audience near the stadium's control room, only succeeding by pretending to have a bomb to spark a panic. Arkady takes control of the live broadcast, holding onto Danni as Knox runs towards the control room from across the field, but he's too late, and the bomb goes off, destroying the control room. But as he starts to mourn, Knox looks more closely at the frozen big screen, which was not destroyed, and notices a time difference in two clocks, realising that the live broadcast was pre-recorded 85 minutes into the match, and that both of them are probably alive. As the crowd stampedes towards the exits, Knox hears Danni crying out and confronts Arkady. With a gun to her head, Knox tells Danni to "use her head" - she gets the hint and headbutts Arkady, sending him briefly reeling, and Knox kills him. Danni reunites with her worried mother, who runs to her arms, and Steed thanks Knox for his bravery. Knox, Danni, her mother, and Faisal (who was near the blast but managed to survive as he rescued an older woman whom he had argued with earlier) leave the stadium.

== Cast ==
- Dave Bautista as Michael Knox
- Alexandra Dinu as Tatiana
- Martyn Ford as Vlad Ivanov
- Lara Peake as Danni
- Amit Shah as Faisal Khan
- Lucy Gaskell as Rachel
- Ralph Brown as Chief Commander Steed
- Julian Cheung as Agent Cho
- Aaron McCusker as Captain Reynolds
- Bill Fellows as Superintendent Thompson
- Craig Conway as Viktor
- Jonathan Pearce as Himself
- Pierce Brosnan as Dimitri Belav
- Ray Stevenson as Arkady Belav

== Production ==
=== Development ===
The idea for Final Score took form during a casual conversation between Signature Entertainment boss Marc Goldberg and West Ham United F.C. co-owner David Sullivan, with whom he was in a distribution partnership. As the team's longtime venue, Boleyn Ground, was about to be vacated and replaced by a residential complex, Goldberg thought it would make for a convenient and unusual film location before its demolition. He contacted fellow British producer Wayne Marc Godfrey of The Fyzz Facility to offer him a share in the venture. The latter suggested Scott Mann, who had helmed the crime thriller Heist for him, as director. As the project's impetus rested solely on the concept of an action film shot at the soon-to-be torn down stadium, an open call for script treatments was quickly issued. It attracted a variety of works, ranging from broad outlines to scene-by-scene rundowns, from which the Lynch Brothers' submission emerged as the favorite.

The film was announced in the run-up to Berlin's European Film Market in February 2016, where it was presented to prospective buyers by production partner and sales representative Highland Films Group. Pitched as "Die Hard in a football stadium," the film was budgeted at US$20 million and originally slated for a 2017 release.

=== Casting ===
In July 2016, Dave Bautista, who had previously starred in Heist, and Pierce Brosnan were announced to be headlining the cast. In the spirit of honesty, Bautista admitted that he had never heard of West Ham United and knew virtually nothing about soccer prior to the shoot, nor did he grow any particular liking for the sport during it. Bodybuilder Martyn "The Nightmare" Ford was cast because he was the only available actor big enough to look intimidating next to Bautista. Ford had previously been in contention for the role of Hinx in Spectre, which Bautista ended up playing.

The film enlisted the participation of several sports media personalities, such as TV host Matthew Lorenzo, announcer Jonathan Pearce, reporter John Anderson (who previously worked for the real-life BBC sports show Final Score), and former West Ham players Tony Cottee and Rufus Brevett. Comedian Ghulam "Guz" Khan also makes a cameo appearance as a cab driver early in the film.

=== Filming and post-production ===
Principal photography was scheduled to begin on 8 August 2016, and officially started 15 August 2016. During the shoot, Boleyn Ground's former executive suites were converted into bedrooms for some of the crew members, including director Scott Mann.

The visual effects were primarily designed at the Bournemouth headquarters of multinational studio Outpost VFX. The company, which had already worked with The Fyzz Facility on the two 47 Meters Down movies, also took an investment in the production. The British Board of Film Classification was consulted during post-production, to ensure compliance of the film with the desired 15 certificate.

== Release ==
Final Score was primed for a wide release in the U.K., before being acquired by Sky Group and shown as part of their new "Sky Cinema Original" line, which entailed a same-day release on the Sky Cinema service and in select theatres. As with other Sky Cinema Originals, the theatrical part of the release was handled by distributor Altitude. A teaser trailer was revealed in June 2018, along with an announcement that the film would open in the U.K. and Ireland on 7 September 2018. Final Score held its world premiere at the Ham Yard Theatre in Soho, London, on 30 August 2018. The film received its domestic VOD release on 21 December 2018, followed by the DVD and Blu-ray on 26 December.

== Reception ==
On the review aggregator website Rotten Tomatoes, 71% of 35 critics' reviews are positive. The website's consensus reads: "Who cares about MacGuffins? Dave Bautista brings enough brawn and heart to this old-school action romp, making Final Score the perfect complement to a bucket of popcorn." On Metacritic the film has a weighted average score of 53 out of 100 based on 8 critics, indicating "mixed or average reviews"

Alex Godfrey of Time Out praised the film, saying "It is wittier, warmer and more unpredictable than it has any right to be." Kevin Crust of Los Angeles Times gave a mixed review "The characters are familiar movie types sufficiently fleshed out and well performed to hit all the emotional and comedic cues. The fight scenes and stunts — especially a masterfully choreographed motorcycle chase throughout the stadium — and a lack of obvious CGI provide the requisite thrills." Pat Brown of Slant Magazine criticized the film, saying "To observe that the Dave Bautista-starring action flick Final Score is yet another Die Hard knockoff may be tiresome, but it's not as if the film gives one much of a choice, as it offers up a ceaseless barrage of scenes lifted from the John McTiernan classic."

=== Similarities with Sudden Death ===
Several reviewers have noted similarities, both in terms of overall premise and individual scenes, between this release and 1995's Sudden Death. In that film, a fire marshal played by Jean-Claude Van Damme must stop a group of armed robbers, who have captured his daughter and planted bombs throughout the venue, before time runs out on game seven of the National Hockey League's Stanley Cup Final. Although he denied having seen Sudden Death prior to making Final Score, director Scott Mann acknowledged the similarities, saying "It totally is kind of like it".

Final Score: Original Motion Picture Soundtrack

Film score by James Edward Barker, Tim Despic
- Released: 7 September 2018
- Genres: Orchestral; rock
- Length: 57:11
- Label: Filmtrax

== Soundtrack ==
The original score was released by Filmtrax on the same day as the picture. It was composed by James Edward Barker and Tim Despic, both of them returning from Heist. The film also features several licensed songs, most prominently 1984's U.K. number-one "Two Tribes" by Frankie Goes to Hollywood. It is heard in the opening credits and later during the motorbike chase, as its lyrical content echoes some of the story's themes.
