= The Hamburg Cell (film) =

2004 docudrama directed by Antonia Bird

- Written by: Ronan Bennett; Alice Perman
- Directed by: Antonia Bird
- Starring: Karim Saleh; Maral Kamel; Omar Berdouni; Adnan Maral
- Music by: Paul Conboy; Adrian Corker; Adrian Maral
- Countries of origin: United Kingdom; Canada
- Original languages: English; Arabic

Production
- Producer: Finola Dwyer
- Cinematography: Florian Hoffmeister
- Editor: St. John O'Rorke
- Running time: 101 minutes
- Production companies: Channel 4 Canadian Broadcasting Corporation

Original release
- Network: Channel 4
- Release: September 2, 2004

The Hamburg Cell is a 2004 British-Canadian television docudrama film produced by Channel 4 and Canadian Broadcasting Corporation, and directed by Antonia Bird. It follows the creation of the Hamburg cell, an Islamist extremist group that included the terrorists who piloted the airplanes hijacked during the September 11 attacks. Although the terrorist cell was led by Mohamed Atta, the film is focused on the character of Ziad Jarrah, the one hijacker who had doubts about the attacks.

The film was based on primary research, including personal interviews, unpublished correspondence, and the official 9/11 Commission Report. It premiered on August 25, 2004 at the Edinburgh International Film Festival. Due to its sensitive subject matter, the film was not given a theatrical release and was instead aired on Channel 4 in the UK on September 2, 2004. In the United States, it was on shown on HBO on January 10, 2005.

== Plot ==
The film opens with Ziad Jarrah about to board United Airlines Flight 93. Before getting on the plane, he makes a phone call to Aysel Senguen, his Turkish wife, and simply tells her "I love you" before hanging up. The story then goes back to five years prior in Greifswald, Germany, where Jarrah is starting college. He is approached by Islamic prayer leader Abdulrahman Al-Makhadi, but Jarrah, who was born in Lebanon to a wealthy family and educated at a Christian school, explains he is not a practicing Muslim. Jarrah begins a relationship with Aysel, another student who is studying to be a dentist.

Jarrah ultimately attends one of Al-Makhadi's prayer meetings, where he hears about atrocities against Muslims in Serbia, conspiracies about a "war on Islam", and jihad as a Muslim's duty. When Aysel moves to Bochum to attend medical school, Jarrah relocates to Hamburg to be closer to her. He becomes involved with the Hamburg mosque and continues to drift towards extremism, contrasted with Mohamed Atta, an already radicalized Muslim who follows the teachings of Ramzi bin al-Shibh about the "godlessness" of modernity.

Jarrah becomes acquainted with Atta and becomes more observant in his faith, which puts an increasing strain on his relationship with Aysel. Jarrah and Atta leave Germany to train as Al-Qaeda members in Afghanistan. Upon Jarrah's return to Germany, he is contacted by members of his worried family who tell him that he must abandon his obsession with jihad. Jarrah placates his family and Aysel by saying that he is going to leave Hamburg for Florida to learn how to become a pilot, away from the influence of his jihadist friends.

In the United States where the planning for the hijackings in Washington and New York takes shape, Jarrah still feels the pull of the temptations of Western culture and comes into conflict with Atta's ideologies.

== Cast ==
- Karim Saleh as Ziad Jarrah
- Maral Kamel as Mohamed Atta
- Agni Scott as Aysel Senguen
- Omar Berdouni as Ramzi Binalshibh
- Adnan Maral as Marwan al-Shehhi
- Tamer Doghem as Zacarias Moussaoui
- Khalid Laith as Abdulaziz al-Omari
- Alexander Siddig as Khalid Sheikh Mohammed
- Kammy Darweish as Abdulrahman Al-Makhadi
- Ziad Adwan as Bashar Musleh

== Critical reception ==
Peter Bradshaw of The Guardian wrote, "Until now, no film-maker has tried [to make a film about the 9/11 hijackers], perhaps due to a fear that they would be accused of romanticising or mythologising the participants. But British director Antonia Bird and screenwriters Ronan Bennett and Alice Pearman break the taboo with a devastatingly low-key, fictionalised drama-documentary." Empire gave a positive review, saying "The world needs films like Hamburg Cell if we're ever going to begin to understand the other side of the so-called 'war on terror'". The Telegraph called it a "courageous, important film...that avoids the pitfalls of melodrama and sensationalism" to show how a secular student becomes indoctrinated into terrorism.

Reviewing the film for Variety, critic Derek Elley said that while the script feels like it brushes over important details such as why Jarrah takes the first step toward Islam, its most powerful angle is in showing how "Jarrah accepts that deceiving the woman he loves is an acceptable price to pay". Allan Hunter of Screen International said The Hamburg Cell "is compelling, provocative viewing but once it incorporates news reports and footage of [September 11] it begins to feel as if it has overstepped the mark...Blurring the line between documenting the facts and dramatising the motives ultimately creates an unsettling experience." Hunter added, "A brave film for anyone to make, it becomes as tense as a fictional thriller but leaves lingering doubts that it tells us any more than we might have gleaned from a straightforward documentary."

== Home media ==
A DVD of the film was released on 14 November 2006 from Acorn Media.

== See also ==
- United 93, a 2006 film
- World Trade Center, a 2006 film
- Zero Dark Thirty, a 2012 film
