= Amit Shah (actor) =

English actor (born 1981)

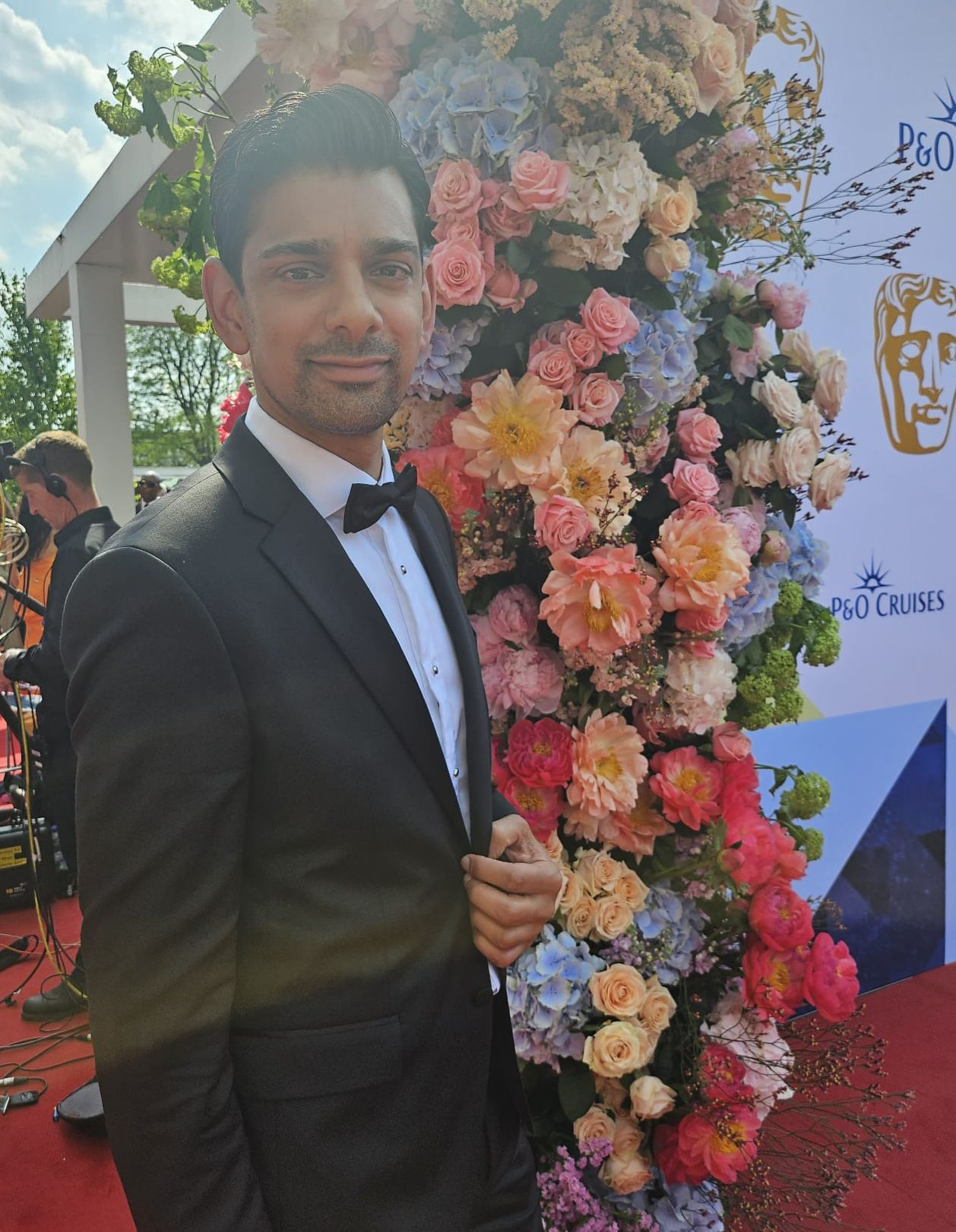
- Shah at BAFTA Awards 2024
- Born: Amit Kaushik Shah; 26 April 1981 (age 45); London, England
- Education: Staffordshire University (BA); London Academy of Music and Dramatic Art (BA)
- Occupation: Actor
- Years active: 2006–present

Amit Kaushik Shah (born 26 April 1981) is a British actor who was BAFTA nominated for his role as Faisal Bhatti in the AMC/BBC hit third series of Happy Valley. He is known for his roles in the ITV series Mr Bates vs The Post Office (2024) and the Channel 4 comedy-drama Crashing (2016). His films include Pain Hustlers (2023), Final Score (2018), and The Courier (2019).

== Early life ==
Amit Shah was born in Enfield, England. Shah's parents were originally from Kenya, and his grandparents from Gujarat, India. His father is an accountant, and his mother is a health-food shop manager. Shah was cast as the lead in a school play at the age of 16. He read drama at Staffordshire University and then went on to train at the London Academy of Music and Dramatic Art in West London. In 2003 he was given permission by the principal to graduate early so that he could begin rehearsals for Bombay Dreams, a West-End musical produced by Andrew Lloyd Webber.

== Acting career ==
In 2006, Shah was offered a part in The Royal Hunt of the Sun at the National Theatre; the same part that Derek Jacobi played in the original production in 1964. He stayed on at the National Theatre to perform three plays, including The Alchemist directed by Nicholas Hytner, for which he was nominated for an Ian Charleson Award. He also portrayed a principal role in The Man of Mode, alongside Tom Hardy, Rory Kinnear and Hayley Atwell.

Shah has starred in a variety of television shows since 2006. His most notable roles include Sunny in BBC One's Hospital People, Fred in Channel 4's Crashing, Torque in The Witcher for Netflix, and Faisal Bhatti in Happy Valley.

Shah's first major part in a feature film was in 2014 for The Hundred-Foot Journey in which he starred alongside Helen Mirren and Om Puri. He has since been cast in Johnny English Strikes Again, Ordinary Love, and Last Christmas. In 2025, he played a leading role in the TV series Murder Before Evensong, based on the novel by Richard Coles.

== Filmography ==
=== Film ===
Key
†	Denotes works that have not yet been released

Year	Film	Role	Director	Notes
2006	Like Minds	Raj Mehta	Gregory J. Read	
2008	The Blue Tower	Neran	Smita Bhide	
2009	13 Semester	Aswin	Frieder Wittich	
2010	It's a Wonderful Afterlife	Speed Dating Man 6	Gurinder Chadha	
2010	The Infidel	Rashid Nasir	Josh Appignanesi	
2011	Lost Paradise	Javad	Waleed Akhtar	
2011	Looking For Neil	Neil	Georgi Banks-Davis	
2012	The Facility	Arif	Ian Clark	
2013	All Stars	Teacher	Ben Gregor	
2014	Cut	The Director	Billy Mullaney	
2014	The Hundred-Foot Journey	Mansur	Lasse Hallström	
2014	The Listener	Jeremy	Michael Gilhooly	
2015	Howl	Matthew	Paul Hyett	
2016	The Break-up of Dave	Dave	Billy Mullaney	
2017	Breathe	Dr. Khan	Andy Serkis	
2017	To Wendy Who Kicked Me When I Said I Love You	Sidd	Dan Castella	
2018	Final Score	Faisal	Scott Mann	
2018	Johnny English Strikes Again	Samir	David Kerr	
2018	The Orgy	John	Sam Baron	
2019	Parasomniac	Errol	Oliver Hill	
2019	Quiet Carriage	Derek	Ben S. Hyland	
2019	Ordinary Love	Steve	Lisa Barros D'Sa, Glenn Leyburn	
2019	End-O	Dr.Mann	Alice Seabright	
2019	Last Christmas	Andy	Paul Feig	
2019	The Courier	Nick Murch	Zackary Adler	
2022	Klokkenluider	Ewan	Neil Maskell	
2023	Pain Hustlers	Eric Paley	David Yates	
2024	7 Keys	Naz	Joy Wilkinson	
2024	Paddington in Peru	Zayden	Dougal Wilson	
2025	Bank of Dave 2: The Loan Ranger	Oliver	Chris Foggin	

=== Television ===
Year	Title	Role	Notes
2006	The Afternoon Play	Nigel	1 episode
2006	Life Begins	Mobile Phone Salesman	1 episode
2007	Lead Balloon	Adam	1 episode
2008	The Palace	Kulvinder 'Vinny' Ganatra	5 episodes
2008	Honest	Reza Chadhuri	6 episodes
2009	Benidorm	Vikram	1 episode
2009	Casualty	Jake Milns	1 episode
2009	Ingenious	Genius	TV movie
2010	Hustle	Ashur Olmert	1 episode
2010	Whites	Axel	6 episodes
2011	Black Mirror	Jack	Episode: "The National Anthem"
2012	White Van Man	Simon	1 episode
2012	Fresh Meat	Sauron	1 episode
2013	Jo	Dr. Amir	1 episode
2013	Bluestone 42	Captain Parekh	1 episode
2013	Lilyhammer	Viswanathan	3 episodes
2014	The Smoke	Nick Chandhrakla	5 episodes
2015	Silent Witness	Dr. Rhavi Dhillon	Episode: "Protection" (2 parts)
2015	Asylum	Oliver	1 episode
2015	W1A	Sadiq Iqbal	1 episode
2015	Jekyll & Hyde	Brannigan	8 episodes
2016	Crashing	Fred	6 episodes
2016	Stag	Mex	3 episodes
2017	Midsomer Murders	Shray Varma	1 episode
2017	Hospital People	Sunny	1 episode
2017	Count Arthur Strong	Karl	1 episode
2017	The Other One	Marcus	1 episode
2016–2017	The Rebel	Jeremy	6 episodes
2018	History of Them	Vikram Johar	TV movie
2018	Bliss	Rafiq	1 episode
2018	Doctor Who	Rahul	Episode: "The Woman Who Fell to Earth"
2018	The Midnight Gang	Dr. Luppers	TV movie
2019	His Dark Materials	Dr. Rendal	1 episode
2019	The Witcher	Torque	1 episode
2020-2022	The Other One	Marcus	Main role; 2 series
2021	The Long Call	Ed Raveley	4 episodes
2022	Happy Valley	Faisal Bhatti	6 episodes
2023	Death in Paradise	Sunil Singh Kirmani	1 episode
2023	The Windsors	Rishi Sunak	Episode: Coronation special
2024	Mr Bates vs The Post Office	Jas Singh	3 episodes
2024	Vera	Mr. Shah	Episode: "Fast Love"
2025	The Revenge Club	Malcolm Ray	6 episodes
2025	Riot Women	Sanjay	1 episode
2025	Murder Before Evensong	DS Vanloo	6 episodes
2026	Death Valley	Ashwin Shaw	1 episode

== Theatre ==
Year	Title	Role	Venue	Director
2003	Bombay Dreams	Cast	Apollo Victoria Theatre	Andrew Lloyd Webber
2006	The Royal Hunt of The Sun	Cast	Royal National Theatre	Trevor Nunn
2007	The Alchemist	Abel Drugger	Royal National Theatre	Nicholas Hytner
2011	King Lear	Oswald	Royal National Theatre	Robin Lough
2012	The Comedy of Errors	Angelo	Royal National Theatre	Dominic Cooke
2014	East is East	Abdul Khan	Trafalgar Studios	Sam Yates
2023	"Never Have I Ever"	Kas	Chichester Festival Theatre	

== Sources ==
- Amit Shah interview on easterneye.biz
- Amit Shah interview re his character Jeremy in The Rebel.
- Amit Shah's Troika page
