= Scott Mann =

Scott Mann may refer to:

- Scott Mann (director), British film and television director
- Scott Mann (politician), British politician
