= Alicia Agneson =

Swedish actress (born 1996)

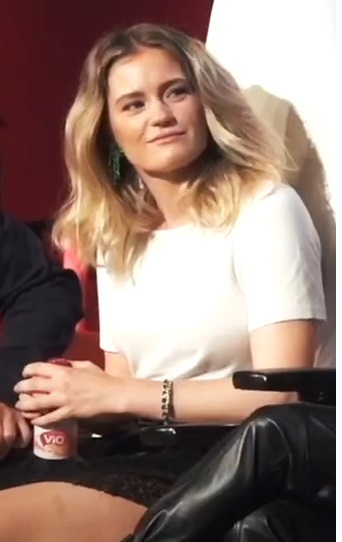
- Agneson at the 2022 German Comic Con
- Born: 26 February 1996 (age 30); Eskilstuna, Sweden
- Occupation: Actress
- Years active: 2013–present

Alicia Agneson (born 26 February 1996) is a Swedish actress. On television, she is known for her role in the History series Vikings (2017–2020). Her films include The Courier (2019).

== Early life ==
Agneson was born and raised on a farm in the town of Eskilstuna, Södermanland County. She began acting, singing and dancing as a child in minor stage productions in Sweden. At the age of fifteen, she dropped out of school and moved to London to pursue her career.

== Career ==
=== Acting and performing ===
In 2013, Agneson made her UK stage debut in titular role of a Cinderella pantomime at the Exeter Corn Exchange. As a singer, Agneson formed a jazz duo called One For My Baby with then boyfriend Kaine Horey. She went on to star in the music videos for Mozaics' "Do This With Me" (2015) and Alvarez Kings' "Fear To Feel" (2016), also produced by Horey.

Agneson made her television debut when she was cast at age 19 in the fifth season of the History Channel drama Vikings as slave turned Queen Freydis, initially a guest appearance before being invited back to recur. After the character's death, Agneson was cast again as Russian princess Katia in the sixth and final season.

In 2019, Agneson debuted her feature film as Eva in Little Kingdom, an independent Slovak film. She then played Agent Simmonds in the 2019 film The Courier. This was followed by another film The Grand Duke of Corsica with Timothy Spall and Peter Stormare in 2020. In 2022, Agneson portrayed hostage Kristin "Kicki" Enmark in the Netflix series Clark.

=== Other ventures ===
Agneson helped her friend, who runs an organisation, distribute aid to those affected by the Russian invasion of Ukraine. Agneson works with Hope for Justice, a charity that aids survivors of human trafficking and modern slavery.

== Personal life ==
As of 2023, Agneson is in a relationship with Norwegian actor Herman Tømmeraas.

== Filmography ==
=== Film ===
Year	Title	Role	Notes
2019	Little Kingdom	Eva	
2019	The Courier	Agent Simmonds	
2021	The Grand Duke of Corsica	Poppea	
2021	A Beautiful Form To See		Short film
2021	Cake Bomb	September	Short film

=== Television ===
Year	Title	Role	Notes
2017–2020	Vikings	Freydis / Katia	21 episodes
2022	Clark	Kicki	2 episodes
2026	The Season	Amina	1 episode

=== Music videos ===
Song	Year	Artist	Notes
"Do This With Me"	2015	Mozaics	
"Fear to Feel"	2016	Alvarez Kings	

== Stage ==
Year	Title	Role	Notes
2013	Cinderella	Cinderella	Corn Exchange, Exeter
