= Heist (2015 film) =

2015 film by Scott Mann

- Theatrical release poster
- Directed by: Scott Mann
- Written by: Stephen Cyrus Sepher; Max Adams
- Produced by: Randall Emmett; George Furla; Wayne Marc Godfrey; Alexander Tabrizi; Stephen Cyrus Sepher
- Starring: Jeffrey Dean Morgan; Robert De Niro; Kate Bosworth; Gina Carano; Mark-Paul Gosselaar; D.B. Sweeney; Lydia Hull; Tyler J. Olsen; Morris Chestnut; Dave Bautista
- Cinematography: Brandon Cox
- Edited by: Robert Dalva
- Music by: James Edward Barker; Tim Despic
- Production companies: Grindstone Entertainment Group; Emmett/Furla/Oasis Films; The Fyzz Facility; Mass Hysteria Entertainment Co
- Distributed by: Lionsgate Premiere
- Release date: November 13, 2015 (United States)
- Running time: 93 minutes
- Country: United States
- Language: English
- Budget: $15 million
- Box office: $4.1 million

Heist (also called Bus 657), is a 2015 American heist action thriller film directed by Scott Mann and written by Stephen Cyrus Sepher and Max Adams, based on the original story by Sepher. The film stars Robert De Niro, Jeffrey Dean Morgan, Kate Bosworth, Morris Chestnut, Dave Bautista, Sepher and Gina Carano. The plot focuses on a casino heist by an employee who needs to pay for his sick daughter's treatment.

The film was released on November 13, 2015, by Lionsgate Premiere.

== Plot ==
Luke Vaughn is working in a Southern casino ("The Swan") run by Francis "The Pope" Silva. Vaughn has a sick daughter and needs $300,000 for a necessary surgery. He approaches "Pope", who refuses his plea for a loan. When Vaughn is insistent, Pope fires him and has him beaten by his right-hand man, Derrick "Dog" Prince.

Security guard Cox tells Vaughn the casino is laundering for the mob. Vaughn, who has the codes to the vault, joins Cox and steals the money. After the heist, the thieves are intercepted by Dog's henchmen. A gun battle ensues, wounding one of the thieves. When their getaway driver escapes, the rest are forced to hijack a city bus. Police officer Kris Bajos hears the gunshots and pursues the bus. When Cox shoots through a window at Bajos, she calls for reinforcements. The police set up a road block.

Vaughn writes the phone number of a passenger named Pauline, who is pregnant, on a bus window to enable Bajos to contact him. He warns her that Cox will kill passengers if the police do not clear the road blocks. Bajos follows through and Vaughn orders Bernie the bus driver to ram the road block, allowing the bus to enter the interstate highway. Passengers' mobile phones are thrown from the bus, and Vaughn asks one of the passengers, a veterinarian student, to take care of the wounded thief. Cox calls Jono, an old man who aided them in planning the robbery, to update him. The bus is running low on fuel, so Vaughn calls for a fuel tanker.

Detective Marconi joins forces with Bajos and instructs her to drive the fuel tanker. Marconi briefs SWAT and monitors the bus via a police helicopter. Vaughn allows Pauline and a young boy to leave the bus. During refueling, Vaughn allows Bajos to board the bus to check on the hostages. After Bajos suggests that the wounded thief be let off the bus for medical treatment, Cox objects and she has an altercation with Cox, during which she takes his gun from his waist. Vaughn defuses the situation. As she finishes refueling, Vaughn asks Bajos to let him know how Pauline is. At the police station, the boy is reunited with his mother, and Bajos interviews Pauline. Dog learns the location of Jono through a police radio scanner.

With the wounded thief suffering blood loss, Vaughn calls Marconi, who boards the bus from a SWAT truck with a medical emergency kit. He hands the vet student a syringe with "pain meds", and the wounded thief dies. Marconi receives a call from Pope and tosses the phone to Vaughn, revealing Marconi's affiliation with Pope. Marconi is thrown from the bus dressed in a beaver costume taken from another passenger, and a SWAT team attacks the bus, popping a tire, causing it to crash near a bridge.

With police surrounding the bus, Cox holds Bernie hostage. Vaughn shoots Cox, saving Bernie. Vaughn receives a call from his daughter, saying she is okay, and Bajos tells him she knows about the hospital bills. Following Bernie's idea, Vaughn negotiates with Marconi the release of all the hostages except one and, once the tire is repaired, the bus departs. The police authorities follow the bus, but it is a decoy and Vaughn escapes with the money in a police car.

Vaughn arrives at Jono's but finds him shot dead. Dog knocks him out with a shot of rock salt. Back on the bus, they are joined by Pope and Marconi, although Pope kills Marconi as Dog pours gasoline on Vaughn. Pope gloats that Vaughn did not make it to the hospital by 7pm with the money. However, Vaughn reveals Pauline is Vaughn's sister, and Vaughn had slipped the $300,000 in her bag earlier. She pays the hospital bill. Bajos deduces what Pauline is doing but does not stop her.

Pope fatally shoots Dog before he can kill Vaughn. Pope loosens Vaughn's ropes and tells him his mother had a saying about people on their deathbed speaking of regrets. He hands a grateful Vaughn the keys to his Rolls-Royce car, which is parked outside, so he can visit his daughter. Pope waits on the bus as the police arrive.

== Cast ==
- Robert De Niro as Francis "The Pope" Silva
- Jeffrey Dean Morgan as Luke Vaughn
- Elizabeth Windley as Riley Vaughn
- Kate Bosworth as Sydney Silva
- Morris Chestnut as Derrick "The Dog" Prince
- Dave Bautista as Jason Cox
- Gina Carano as Officer Krizia "Kris" Bajos
- D.B. Sweeney as Bernie
- Mark-Paul Gosselaar as Detective Marconi
- Stephen Cyrus Sepher as Julian Dante
- Tyson Sullivan as Mickey
- Christopher Rob Bowen as Eric
- Lydia Hull as Pauline
- Scott Herman as Sergeant Thomas Forbes

== Production ==
On November 6, 2013, at the American Film Market sale, it was announced that film production and financing company Emmett/Furla/Oasis Films acquired a heist script, then titled Bus 757, from writer Stephen Cyrus Sepher. The script, about a card dealer who puts a crew together to rob a bank and hijack a city bus, with an announced budget of $15 million budget, was being produced by Randall Emmett, George Furla, Alexander Tabrizi and Sepher. On May 17, 2014, it was announced that Scott Mann would direct, Lionsgate would distribute, and Robert De Niro would star in the lead role of "The Pope", the casino owner whose money is the target of the heist.

The title of the film had been changed to Bus 657 by September 24, 2014, when Jeffrey Dean Morgan, Kate Bosworth, Dave Bautista and Gina Carano joined the cast of the film, which also added Max Adams as an additional screenwriter. On October 13, it was confirmed that screenwriter and actor Sepher was spotted on the set, later confirmed to be performing as one of the robbery crew. Morris Chestnut was spotted on the set on October 15, with his casting as Derrick "Dog" Prince confirmed two days later, acting as "The Pope's" right-hand man who has to bring the money back before the cops seize it and realize it's dirty.

Filming was scheduled to take place in Baton Rouge, Louisiana, but was moved to Mobile, Alabama, and filming began on October 13, 2014. On October 15, De Niro was spotted filming in the Crystal Ballroom of The Battle House Hotel, which had been transformed into a 1940s-style casino called "The Swan Casino". On the same day, scenes were filmed on the corner of Royal and St. Francis streets in downtown Mobile. On October 21, filming took place on the Causeway, which was closed by the police from the eastbound entrance of Bankhead Tunnel to east of the USS Alabama Battleship Memorial Park.

== Release ==
In October 2014, at the American Film Market sale, the film (under its second title, Bus 657) was sold to a number of international distributors, including Lionsgate International for the UK. The film was released on November 13, 2015, in a limited release and through video on demand.

== Reception ==
On the review aggregator website Rotten Tomatoes, 30% of 27 critics' reviews are positive, with an average rating of 4.9/10. The website's consensus reads: "Heist stacks its deck with an all-star cast but this humorless action potboiler doesn't give them a good hand to play." Metacritic, which uses a weighted average, assigned the film a score of 37 out of 100, based on 11 critics, indicating "generally unfavorable" reviews.

Chris Nashawaty of Entertainment Weekly gave Heist a C, describing it as "a generic and forgettable thriller that is particularly derivative of Speed", which he considered a superior film.
