= Tyson Sullivan =

American film and television actor (born 1986)

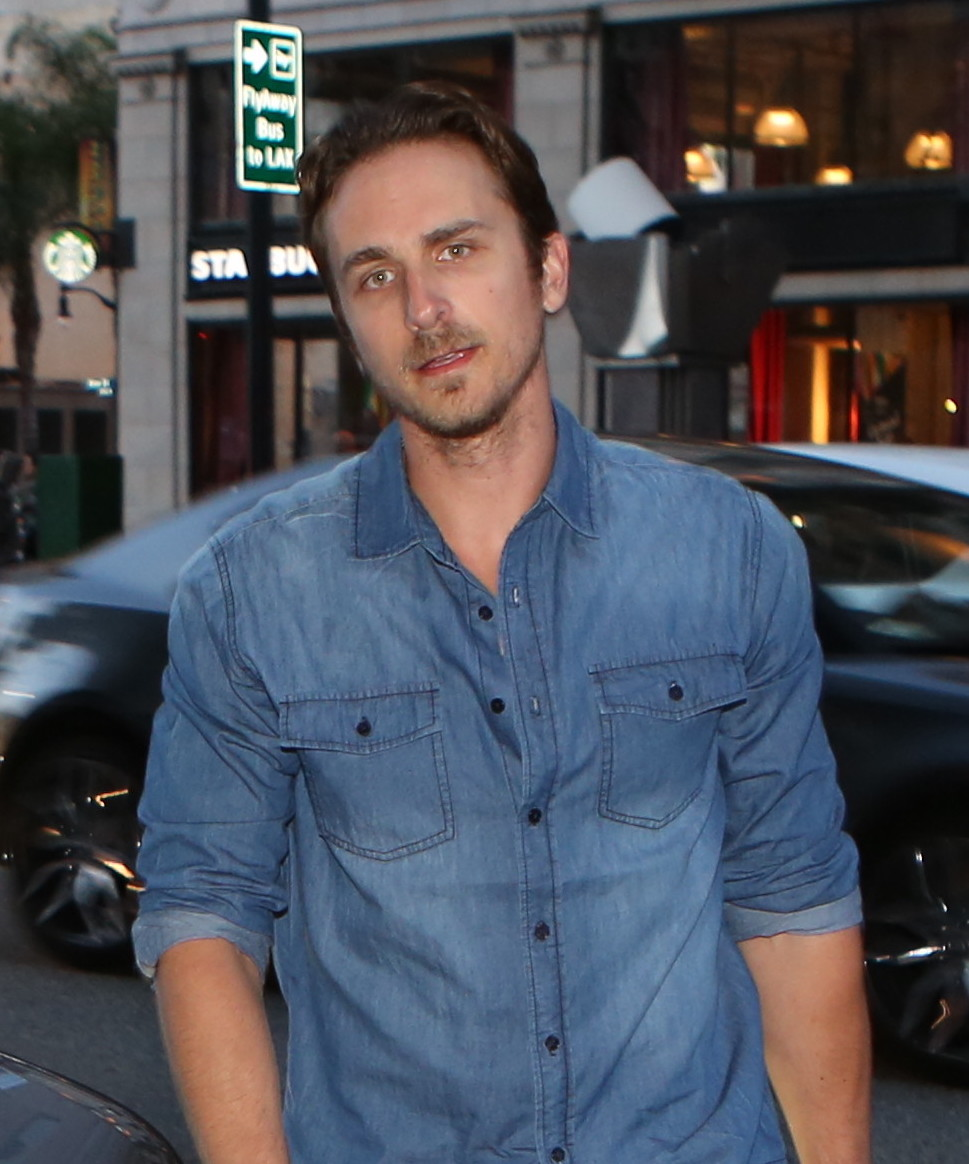
- Tyson Sullivan in front of Katsuya Hollywood
- Born: 1986 (age 39–40); Plano, Texas, United States
- Occupation: Actor
- Spouse: Whitney Sullivan (m. 2012)

Tyson Sullivan (born 1986) is an American film and television actor. He was born in Plano, Texas to Tommie and David Sullivan. He entered the business of acting and film at a very young age, getting his first paid acting job when he was just a child by starring in a Dr. Pepper commercial. After graduating from Plano West High School in 2004, he moved to Los Angeles where he attended Biola University and started pursuing an acting career. He then started to study acting at Playhouse West, Warner Loughlin Studios, and with Carole D’Andrea. He gained popularity for his portrayal of Hondo, a white-supremacist villain on the Cinemax series Banshee. Since 2015, his acting career gained more relevance and attention, and as of 2016 he's starred in shows such as "Without a Trace", "Bonnie & Clyde", "Heist", and other popular shows and movies.

He lives in Arizona with his wife. He is a gamer and car aficionado.

== Career ==
After graduating, Sullivan guest starred in several television shows including "Without a Trace", "Bonnie & Clyde", and his first Television appearance came in a minor role on the show "Days of Our Lives".

All before landing a recurring role on the HBO show "Banshee" (2014–2015) as Hondo, the white supremacist whose propensity for violence and hateful tattoos were a staple for several seasons. He appeared regularly throughout season 2 and left the show in early season 3. He then filmed several films including; Demonic (2015), co-starring Frank Grillo of "Warrior", "Double Daddy" (2015), opposite Brittany Curran, and " Heist" (2015), opposite Robert De Niro and Kate Bosworth.

Sullivan is also known for playing Scott Milam, a small but crucial role, on FX's series Justified.

In 2016 he joined the cast of Quarry alongside Logan Marshall Green, Peter Mullan, and Matt Nable. He played Hall Prewitt a marine in Mac's unit whose kind demeanor and sense of humor are at odds with his surroundings.

At the end of 2016 it was announced that Sullivan would be joining the cast of DOA Blood River playing the lead antagonist in the film opposite Days of Our Lives star Billy Flynn.

== Personal ==
Tyson Sullivan was born in Plano, Texas, to Tommie and David Sullivan. He graduated from Plano West High School in 2004 and moved out to Los Angeles where he attended Biola University. He currently resides with his wife in Paradise Valley, Arizona. He's a self-proclaimed "gamer."

He is also a car enthusiast, collecting and driving collectable vehicles.

== Filmography ==
Film
Year	Title	Role	Notes
2007	Rocket Science	Rick	
2008	Richard III	York Subordinate	
2009	A Quiet Fire	Keith	Short
2010	It's Whatever	Aaron	
2010	Pitter Patter	Lane	Short
2014	Demonic	Luke Elton	
2015	Heist	Mickey	
2015	Double Daddy	Trent	
2017	DOA Blood River	Walker	In Post-Production

Television series and mini-series
Year	Title	Role	Notes
2006	Days of Our Lives	Nurse/ Eric	
2008	Without a Trace	Jake	
2013	Bonnie & Clyde	Waco deputy	TV Miniseries
2013	Justified	Scott Milam	
2014–15	Banshee	Hondo	
2016	Quarry	Hall Prewitt	
