= Tug of War (2006 film) =

- Release date: 2006
- Country: United Kingdom
- Language: English

Tug of War is a 2006 short film by British film director Scott Mann. The film was a co-production between Bigger Picture Productions and Shakabuku Films with the assistance of Granada Film and was Mann's directorial debut. Completion funding was provided by the UK Film Council.

== Synopsis ==
Four college friends enter into a bet to see who can go the longest without 'self-love'. Tug of War follows their trials and tribulations as they try to last ten torturous days.

== Cast ==
- Scott Neal
- Marsha Thomason
- Julie Goodyear
- Jo Guest
- Martin Hancock
- Zoe McConnell
