= Hospital People =

British mockumentary series

- Genre: Mockumentary
- Written by: Tom Binns; Tom Doolan; Matt Morgan
- Directed by: Paul Murphy
- Starring: Tom Binns; Amit Shah; Janine Duvitski; Mandeep Dhillon
- Country of origin: United Kingdom
- No. of episodes: 6 (and a pilot)

Production
- Production company: Roughcut TV

Original release
- Network: BBC One
- Release: 26 February 2016; 21 April 2017

Hospital People is a British mockumentary series set in the fictional Brimlington Hospital in the fictional town of Brimlington. The main star of the programme is Tom Binns who plays four different characters in the series. He has a supporting cast of another three actors with guest stars filling in the other roles on an episode-by-episode basis. A pilot episode was shown on BBC One in February 2016, from which a whole series was commissioned and then broadcast in 2017.

== Premise ==
The mockumentary focuses upon the day-to-day running of a hospital set on the coast of Yorkshire. Tom Binns, the co-creator, co-writer and main star of the programme, has said it is based on where he is from on the Yorkshire/Derbyshire border but also on the coast as it is fictional. The programme shows the main characters as a hospital manager and her assistant, a porter, a DJ and his assistant and a hospital chaplain and his organist. Each week a guest star would fulfil a prominent role as part of the main back story to the episode.

== Characters ==
- Susan Mitchell, the hospital manager who is always dreaming up big ideas
- Ian D Montfort, a hospital porter who is also a medium
- Ivan Brackenbury (also known as "The Cheerful Earful"), the DJ on the hospital radio
- Father Kenny Mercer, the hospital chaplain.

All the above are played by Tom Binns. Binns had previously appeared as Brackenbury and Montfort in his stage shows.

- Sunny Prasad (Amit Shah), Susan Mitchell's exasperated assistant
- Mrs Leydon (Janine Duvitski), the chaplains assistant
- Shaz Dutta (Mandeep Dhillon), Ivan the DJ's trainee producer

Guest stars in the first series included Russell Brand, Sally Phillips, James Fleet, Mark Williams, Sian Gibson and Alexander MacQueen.

== Episodes ==
=== Pilot (2016) ===
Title	Directed by	Written by	Original release date
"Hospital people"	David Kerr	Tom Binns & Matt Morgan	26 February 2016
A new manager, Susan Mitchell, takes over the struggling Brimlington hospital. However, she comes from a commercial management background and many of her changes are focused on making money rather than providing healthcare. She expands the little newsagents, inflates the parking prices and installs a new 'point-of-care' patient entertainment system that costs £10 for 24 hours.

=== Season 1 (2017) ===
No.	Title	Directed by	Written by	Original release date
1	"The Hospital Awards"	Paul Murphy	Tom Binns, Tom Doolan & Matt Morgan	21 April 2017
The hospital manager, Susan Mitchell, wins the bid for Brimlington to host the Annual Regional Hospital Awards and has managed to get a star host for the evening, an established actor from a long-running fictional hospital drama, Good Medicine. Father Kenny and DJ Ivan are in competition for the Patients Choice Awards, while the spiritualist porter, Ian, is forced to face conventional medicine head on. (Guest star: Alex Macqueen).
2	"The Security Threat"	Paul Murphy	Tom Binns, Tom Doolan & Matt Morgan	28 April 2017
The Head of Hospital Security, is given a briefing from manager Susan Mitchell to increase protection after an intruder is found to have accessed sensitive parts of the hospital. Elsewhere, the resident DJ Ivan Brackenbury has an admirer, the porter-cum-psychic healer Ian gets caught up in a case of mistaken identity, and Father Kenny has a new toy. (Guest star; Sian Gibson).
3	"The Local Millionaire"	Paul Murphy	Tom Binns, Tom Doolan & Matt Morgan	5 May 2017
Hospital manager Susan Mitchell is ecstatic when philanthropic local businessman Tony Jackson is taken ill and is admitted into Brimlington Hospital. Father Kenny finds a fellow comic in Tony Jackson, while porter Ian meets an opponent. The DJ, Ivan, raises money to help a patient go to America for treatment, but does he have an ulterior motive as it is a pet, not a human. (Guest star; Mark Williams).
4	"The Health Guru"	Paul Murphy	Tom Binns, Tom Doolan & Matt Morgan	19 May 2017
After the death of a beloved staff member, the hospital manager Susan Mitchell, wants to promote healthy living at Brimlington Hospital. She decides that the best way to do this is to hire celebrity nutritionist Tyler Watt to overhaul the health of the hospital catering and vending machines. The health drive hits Ivan the DJ very hard (he likes five sugars in his tea), keeps Ian the porter/medium busy and allows father Kenny to plan for the biggest gig of his career. (Guest star; Russell Brand).
5	"The New Ward"	Paul Murphy	Tom Binns, Tom Doolan & Matt Morgan	26 May 2017
Manager Susan Mitchell is desperate to impress visiting health Secretary Helena Steel MP, who is coming to open the new ward. Father Kenny sees an opportunity to increase his audience, and hospital radio DJ Ivan continues to find wacky ways to raise money. (Guest star; Sally Phillips).
6	"The Charity Single"	Paul Murphy	Tom Binns, Tom Doolan & Matt Morgan	16 June 2017
Brimlington Hospital is in dire need of funding, so Susan Mitchell decides to record a charity single with the help of Local choirmaster Neville Burley. Before long, Neville and Susan fall out and this makes Neville angry. Father Kenny auditions for a part in the choir, DJ Ivan gets to grips with his new studio equipment, and Ian's spiritualist talents are finally acknowledged by the public. (Guest star; James Fleet).

== Production ==
The University Hospital in Hartlepool was used to film both the exterior and the interior shots. The interior sequences used a section of the hospital that were not being used by the NHS at that time and this also generated extra revenue for the University Hospital.

The programme was first profiled on the BBC's Comedy Playhouse medium. The first episode was the pilot which was broadcast in February 2016 and thereafter, the BBC commissioned a series that ran to six episodes and was broadcast from April 2017. The programme was produced by Roughcut productions.
