= The Rebel (British TV series) =

- Based on: "The Rebel" cartoon strip
- Starring: Simon Callow
- No. of episodes: 9

Original release
- Network: Gold
- Release: 20 July 2016 – 13 December 2017

The Rebel is a 2016 British comedy series on Gold starring Simon Callow in the title role. The show is based on "The Rebel" cartoon strip in The Oldie magazine by Andrew Birch. It began airing in June 2016. In total, 9 episodes have aired.

The cast also includes Anita Dobson, Bill Paterson and Amit Shah.

== Plot ==
The show follows 70 year old Henry Palmer, a widowed resident of Brighton who is an anarchic, anti-establishment pensioner.

== Cast ==
=== Main cast ===
- Simon Callow as Henry Palmer, a pensioner
- Bill Paterson as Charles, a former hippie
- Anita Dobson as Margaret, a charity shop worker
- Anna Crilly as Cath, Henry's daughter
- Amit Shah as Jeremy, the husband of Cath
- Vivian Oparah as Amaya (series two)

=== Recurring cast ===
- Philip Cumbus as PC Burns

=== Other cast ===
- Rob Horrocks as Posh Waiter

== Background ==
The Rebel is based on Andrew Birch's cartoon strip for The Oldie. Vadim Jean is the director of the series. In July 2017 it was announced that The Rebel was renewed for a second series. Bill Paterson, Anita Dobson, Anna Crilly and Amit Shah reprised their roles.

== Episodes ==
=== Series 1 ===
No. overall	No. in series	Title	Directed by	Written by	Original release date	Viewers (millions)
1	1	"Law"	Vadim Jean	Andrew Birch	20 July 2016	0.15
After being forced by his daughter to visit his GP, witnessing a robbery and assaulting a police officer with a teddy bear, widower Henry Palmer decides to relive his rebellious youth by going on the rampage.
2	2	"Charity"	Vadim Jean	Andrew Birch	27 July 2016	N/A
Henry's friend Charles seems to have gone missing, but is in fact working at a new charity shop "Virtuous" that is in direct competition with Margaret's shop. Henry leads a rebellion against the new charity.
3	3	"Art"	Vadim Jean	Andrew Birch	3 August 2016	N/A
While Charles is holding the fort at Margaret's shop he sells an item that is not only of great sentimental value to her but also appears to be an early work by Marcel Duchamp. The gang attempt to retrieve it.

=== Series 2 ===
No. overall	No. in series	Title	Directed by	Written by	Original release date	Viewers (millions)
4	1	"Money"	Vadim Jean	Andrew Birch	8 November 2017	N/A
Visiting daughter Cath Henry realizes that she has money problems, with husband Jeremy working in Africa. Charles, in receipt of a legacy, offers to help but Henry refuses. However the lettings agents only suggest Henry sells his house to stave off Cath being evicted and the bank refuses a loan. Henry realizes the only way to help may be to say farewell to the past - literally.
5	2	"Death"	Vadim Jean	Andrew Birch, James Cary, Richard Hurst	15 November 2017	N/A
Henry is to deliver a eulogy at a friend's funeral and Cath's lodger agrees to drive them to the church, along with Margaret and Charles but Henry decides to go on his old Mod scooter,. Unfortunately he has an accident and goes flying over a hedge, needing to take a train to finish the journey. The question is, will he make it in time?
6	3	"Health"	Vadim Jean	Andrew Birch	22 November 2017	N/A
After Henry has celebrated his 71st birthday by jumping into the sea and Charles has eaten a dodgy kebab they both end up in hospital. Charles' jealousy of Margaret's friendship with Dr Cranmore ends him up in isolation whilst Heny's attempts to escape are stopped short by a memory from the past.
7	4	"Drugs"	Vadim Jean	Andrew Birch, James Cary, Richard Hurst	29 November 2017	N/A
When Charles' ex-wife Angela is arrested for growing cannabis Henry persuades Charles to sell the crops to pay for her lawyer and they set up their Magic Muffins stall on the seafront. The muffins taste awful but fortunately ex-hippy chick Margaret can show them the right recipe. However the vengeful P C Burns is onto them and it is Cath and Amaya, fighting against a healthy eating regime, who ultimately destroy the evidence.
8	5	"Sex"	Vadim Jean	Andrew Birch	6 December 2017	N/A
Henry takes his friends to a club where Margaret attracts the unwanted attention of the suave Dennis - to Charles' envy. Encouraged by Angela Charles attempts to make a play for Margaret but Henry's effort to fend off Dennis is almost misunderstood. Meanwhile Cath throws her own party but gets a surprise announcement from Jeremy.
9	6	"Love"	Andrew Birch	James Cary, Richard Hurst	13 December 2017	N/A
After Charles tells him he is thinking of moving back to Scotland where he has been left a house Henry discovers he has been burgled and the urn containing his late wife's ashes stolen. Cath persuades him to try and retrieve it, leading to a dodgy antique dealer, a trio of juvenile delinquents and a family row, healed after Cath gets the ashes back. Margaret and Charles also come to a decision.
