= Keara Murphy =

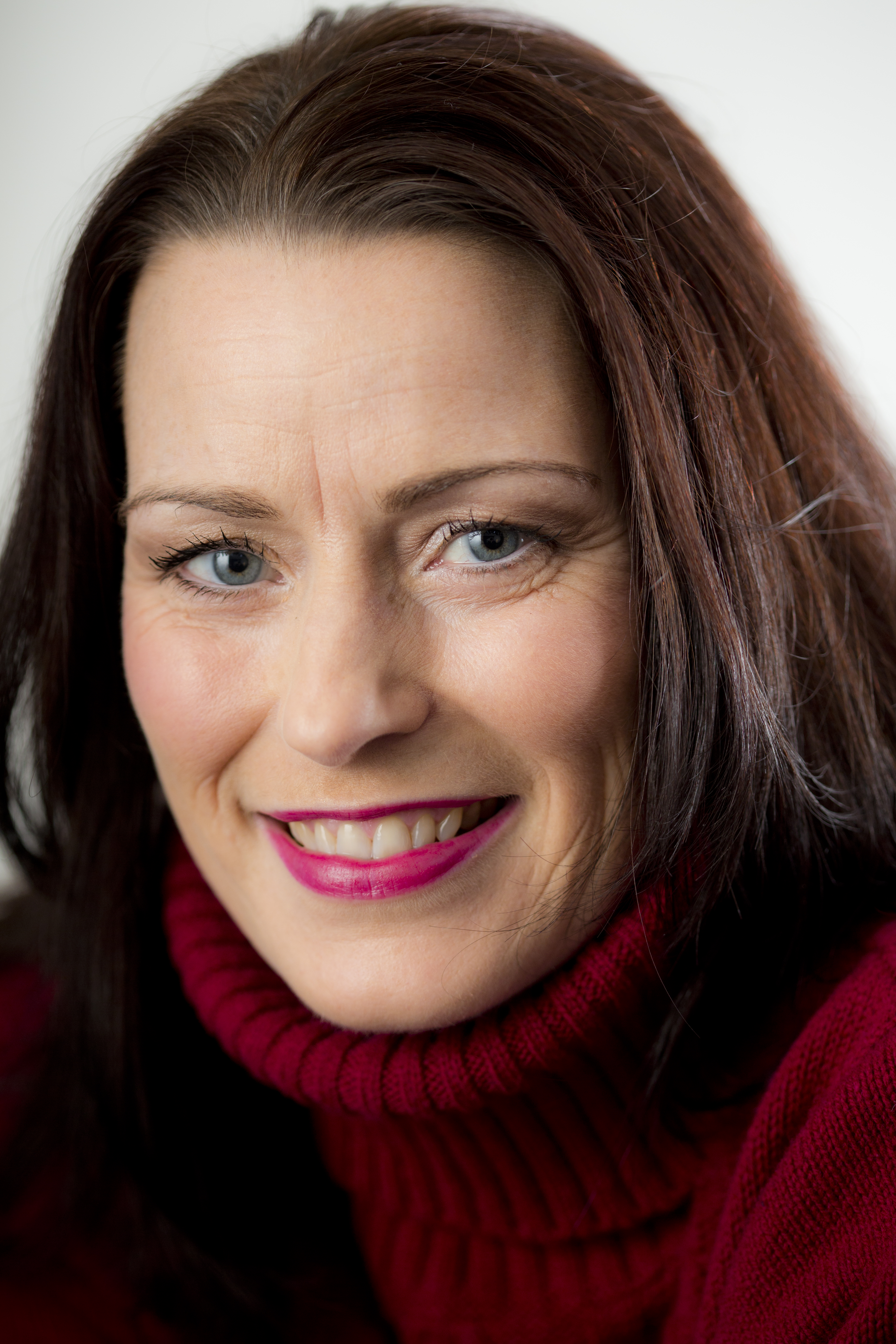
- Born: 1967 (age 58–59); Glasgow
- Notable work: The Secret Sex Life of Robert Burns

Comedy career
- Years active: 1998-present
- Medium: Film, theatre, stand-up
- Website: kearamurphy.com

Keara Patricia Murphy is a stand-up comedian, actor and playwright from Glasgow, Scotland. She has named Billy Connolly as an early influence.

== Biography ==
Her father was an optician from Scotland and her mother came from Belfast.

Murphy has worked as a housing officer with Glasgow City Council, caseworker at the Hamish Allan Centre, and drama teacher, and moved to Edinburgh in 1999. She studied drama, and graduated with distinction from Queen Margaret University College in 2002. She lived and worked in Central and Eastern Europe from 2003 to 2005, and ran a comedy club in Budapest. She appeared in the films The Best Man (2005) and Joy Division (2006). She has written three plays about Robert Burns and presented three programmes about him on BBC Radio Scotland.

In 2012 Murphy's show at the Glasgow Comedy Festival focused on her unsuccessful relationships. It was called Flypaper for Freaks. In 2013 her comedy series, The Shark's Mouth, was broadcast on BBC Radio Scotland. Mistress MacKenzie and Friends, a spin-off series, followed in 2014.

Murphy's 2016 play The Secret Sex Life of Robert Burns discusses some of the national poet's romantic affairs from the points of view of the women affected, and is the first production by Murphy's Blue Eyed Lassie company, which aims to encourage female artists in Scotland.

== Plays ==
- Mice and Women
- The Bard and I
- The Secret Sex Life of Robert Burns

== Documentaries ==
- The Secret Sex Life of Robert Burns
- The Secret Tax Life of Robert Burns
- The Secret Rock 'n' Roll Life of Robert Burns
