= The Courier (2019 film) =

2019 film directed by Zackary Adler

- Theatrical release poster
- Directed by: Zackary Adler
- Written by: Zackary Adler; James Edward Barker; Andy Conway; Nicky Tate
- Produced by: James Edward Barker; Marc Goldberg; David Haring
- Starring: Olga Kurylenko; Gary Oldman; Amit Shah; Alicia Agneson; Greg Orvis; Craig Conway; William Moseley; Dermot Mulroney
- Cinematography: Michel Abramowicz
- Edited by: Nick McCahearty
- Music by: James Edward Barker; Tim Despic
- Production companies: Grindstone Entertainment Group; Capstone Pictures; Signature Entertainment; Rollercoaster Angel Productions
- Distributed by: Lionsgate (United States); Signature Entertainment (United Kingdom)
- Release dates: November 22, 2019 (United States); December 20, 2019 (United Kingdom)
- Running time: 99 minutes
- Countries: United States; United Kingdom
- Language: English
- Box office: $4.7 Million

The Courier is a 2019 action thriller film directed by Zackary Adler, from a screenplay by Andy Conway and Nicky Tate. It stars Olga Kurylenko, Gary Oldman, Amit Shah, Alicia Agneson, Greg Orvis, Craig Conway, William Moseley and Dermot Mulroney.

The film was released in the United States on November 22, 2019, by Lionsgate and in the United Kingdom on December 20, 2019, by Signature Entertainment.

== Plot ==
Ezekiel Mannings, a wealthy businessman and notorious crime lord who is under house arrest in New York, seeks the elimination of Nick Murch, the only witness who can tie him to a murder. Murch is sequestered in a heavily guarded safe room in London in order to give evidence against Mannings over a video link to the United States. An unnamed female courier and former special ops soldier delivers a package to the safe room, unaware that the package contains a cyanide gas weapon intended to kill Nick. She rescues Nick from the attack and discovers that his protection detail has been compromised. The two are trapped in an underground parking garage full of heavily armed men who have been sent to finish the job. The assassins have an hour to find and kill Nick and the courier before police backup arrives, but she kills all of them in a brutal battle and transports a gravely wounded Nick to a hospital. He survives to testify against Mannings.

== Cast ==
- Olga Kurylenko as The Courier
- Gary Oldman as Ezekiel Mannings
- Amit Shah as Nick Murch
- Alicia Agneson as Agent Simmonds
- Greg Orvis as The Sniper
- Craig Conway as Agent Parlow
- William Moseley as Agent Bryant
- Dermot Mulroney as Special Agent Roberts
- Calli Taylor as Alys Mannings

== Production ==
In October 2018, it was announced Olga Kurylenko would star in the film, with Zackary Adler directing from a screenplay by Zackary Adler, James Edward Barker, Andy Conway and Nicky Tate, with Marc Goldberg and James Edward Barker producing under their Signature Films and Rollercoaster Angel Productions banner, respectively.

In January 2019, Gary Oldman joined the cast of the film. In February 2019, Dermot Mulroney, William Moseley, Amit Shah, Alicia Agneson and Craig Conway joined the cast of the film.

Principal photography began in February 2019.

== Release ==
The Courier was released in the United States on November 22, 2019, by Lionsgate and in the United Kingdom on December 20, 2019, by Signature Entertainment.

== Reception ==
On review aggregator Rotten Tomatoes, the film holds an approval rating of 10% based on 20 reviews, with an average rating of 2.8/10. On Metacritic, the film has a weighted average score of 15 out of 100, based on five critics, indicating "overwhelming dislike".

A scathing Rex Reed in the Observer named Oldman's performance the worst of his career, and said, "In the moronic thriller The Courier, nothing works on any level, but most of all where it matters most—a script that makes sense."
