= Precious Cargo (film) =

2016 film by Max D. Adams

- Theatrical release poster
- Directed by: Max Adams
- Written by: Max Adams; Paul V. Seetachitt
- Produced by: Randall Emmett; George Furla; Norton Herrick; Scott Mann; James Edward Barker; Ted Fox
- Starring: Mark-Paul Gosselaar; Bruce Willis
- Cinematography: Brandon Cox
- Edited by: Robert Dalva
- Music by: James Edward Barker; Tim Despic
- Production companies: Grindstone Entertainment Group; Emmett Furla Oasis Films; Herrick Entertainment; Mann Made Films
- Distributed by: Lionsgate Premiere
- Release date: April 22, 2016
- Running time: 90 minutes
- Country: Canada
- Language: English
- Box office: $567,064

Precious Cargo is a 2016 Canadian action film directed by Max Adams and written by Adams and Paul V. Seetachitt. The film stars Mark-Paul Gosselaar, Bruce Willis, Claire Forlani, John Brotherton, Lydia Hull, and Daniel Bernhardt. The film was released on April 22, 2016, by Lionsgate Premiere and was widely panned by critics.

== Plot ==
To get back in the good graces of her murderous boss (Bruce Willis), a seductive thief (Claire Forlani) recruits an ex-lover (Mark-Paul Gosselaar) to steal rare and valuable gems.

== Cast ==
- Mark-Paul Gosselaar as Jack
- Bruce Willis as Eddie Filosa
- Claire Forlani as Karen
- John Brotherton as Nicholas
- Lydia Hull as Jenna
- Daniel Bernhardt as Simon
- Scott Bryce as FBI Agent Marco
- Jim Ford as FBI SWAT Driver
- Ashley Kirk as Zoe
- Tyler Jon Olson as Lucas
- Jenna B. Kelly as Logan
- Christopher Rob Bowen as Glenn
- Reed Birney as FBI Agent Michael
- Robert John Burke as FBI Agent John
- Torrie Wilson as Vanessa
- Sammi Barber as Apsara
- Jean-Claude Leuyer as Gustavo
- Nicholas M. Loeb as Andrew Herzberg

== Production ==
The movie was filmed in Gulfport, MS at the Island View Casino and the Port of Gulfport in 2015.

== Release ==
The film was released on April 22, 2016, by Lionsgate Premiere and filming in New York City, New York.

=== Box office ===
As of July 24, 2020, Precious Cargo grossed $567,064 in the United Arab Emirates, Portugal, Turkey, United Kingdom, and Thailand.

== Reception ==
On the review aggregator website Rotten Tomatoes, 0% of 22 critics' reviews are positive, with an average rating of 2.6/10. On Metacritic, the film has a weighted average score of 27 out of 100, based on reviews from 4 critics.

Ian Freer of Empire magazine wrote: "In the ’90s it would have been a serviceable DTV alternative when the Van Damme/Jeff Wincott flick was out at Blockbuster. These days it is a lacklustre anachronism. Bruce Willis should really know better." Peter Bradshaw of The Guardian gave it 1 out of 5 and wrote: "A straight-to-video nightmare is all that's on offer here."

== See also ==
- List of films with a 0% rating on Rotten Tomatoes
- Bruce Willis filmography
