= Qayrun =

Qayrun قيرون
- Village
- Location in Syria
- Coordinates: 35°7′58″N 36°20′32″E
- Country: Syria
- Governorate: Hama
- District: Masyaf
- Subdistrict: Masyaf

Population (2004)
  - Total: 1,084
- Time zone: UTC+3 (AST)
- City Qrya Pcode: C3368

Qayrun (Arabic: قيرون) is a Syrian village located in the Masyaf Subdistrict in Masyaf District, located west of Hama. According to the Syria Central Bureau of Statistics (CBS), Qayrun had a population of 1,084 in the 2004 census. Its inhabitants are predominantly Alawites.

The writer Mamdouh Adwan was one of the notable people born in Qayrun.

== Bibliography ==
- Boulanger, Robert (1966). The Middle East, Lebanon, Syria, Jordan, Iraq, Iran. Hachette.
