= The Best Man (2005 film) =

2005 film by Stefan Schwartz

- Poster
- Directed by: Stefan Schwartz
- Written by: Stefan Schwartz; Ed Roe
- Produced by: Neil Peplow
- Starring: Stuart Townsend; Amy Smart; Seth Green
- Cinematography: Haris Zambarloukos
- Edited by: Alan Strachan; Jeremy Strachan
- Music by: James Barker; Tim Despic
- Release dates: 10 November 2005 (Monte Carlo Comedy Film Festival); 9 July 2006 (ABC Family)
- Running time: 96 minutes
- Country: United Kingdom
- Language: English

The Best Man is a 2005 romantic comedy film starring Stuart Townsend, Amy Smart, and Seth Green. It was directed by Stefan Schwartz from a script by Schwartz and Ed Roe. It aired in North America on the ABC Family channel on 9 July 2006 under the title Best Man, Worst Friend. It was released direct-to-video on 30 January 2007 under its original title and also as Unhitched.

== Plot ==
Childhood friends Olly Pickering and Murray go their separate ways when Olly goes to university. While there, Olly meets James. Murray vomits all over James, creating instant enmity between them.

Olly writes the two first chapters of a novel and an editor pays him $50,000 to finish it. But he gets writer's block, so loses all his money. He finds a job in London as assistant to Dana, an editor of self-help books for women.

James is going to marry in London and throws a party which he invites Olly to. Olly arrives late and gets covered in pigeon droppings in Trafalgar Square. He changes into some women's trousers. James wants Olly to be his best man and write a funny speech.

Olly feels out of place at the party. He is told off by Becka, the rightful owner of his trousers, and to Sarah without knowing she is James's girlfriend. While at the party, Olly meets, and immediately falls in love with Sarah while standing out on the balcony, but James thinks he has fallen in love with Becka. Harry, Tania and barrister Graham discuss the matter in the pub. Murray will see to it that the wedding is cancelled.

Murray phones Sarah on Olly's behalf and they fix a date to see a film. Murray makes Sarah believe James is still a womanizer. Murray also sets Olly up with Sarah in Selfridges to see to the wedding list. He also phones James several times from Stan's porn shop, and appears at Becka and Sarah's flat saying that James has decided to sell it.

Back at Selfridges, Olly watches in amazement how Dana tries on a wedding dress although she is supposed to be already married and in a meeting. Dana gives Olly the sack next day. Graham talks to her trying to convince her to give Olly his job back. He doesn't convince her, but he ends up with a date with her. Sarah finds some unknown red knickers that Murray had hidden to frame James, and she find the porn shop phone number in James's mobile phone, so she calls the wedding off.

Murray gives a surprise party for Olly with everyone there except James. Murray admits he's plotted everything and Olly writes a letter to Sarah on James's behalf. James is going to pretend that he is leaving for New York broken-hearted. Sarah falls for this and says she will marry him. Olly is left thinking he has done the right thing. Murray tells Olly that James has shagged somebody while already in a relationship with Sarah, but he doesn't believe it.

Olly goes to James's stag party, which is a bit wild, with two strippers dressed as policewomen. James admits that he has been unfaithful to Sarah, because she can't satisfy him completely, although he wants to marry her as her family has money and connections, and she is pretty. Olly wants to tell Sarah, but James handcuffs him to a pillar.

When he gets free, he goes to the wedding place, preventing another wedding from happening while on his way. Murray is making a fool of himself trying to earn some time. Olly finally arrives, and with the help of Becka, who says that James has been unfaithful with his secretary and she blames another girl. Finally, Sarah calls off the wedding.

Six months later, Becka and Murray get married and Olly and Sarah end up together. Olly returns to writing and he produces a best-seller.

== Cast ==
- Stuart Townsend as Olly Pickering
  - Raphael Schwartz as Olly Aged 2
  - Jacob Collier (as Jacob Moriarty) as Olly Aged 10
  - Callum Williams as Murray Aged 10
- Amy Smart as Sarah Marie Barker
- Seth Green as Murray
- Steve John Shepherd as James
- Simon Callow as Big-Time Publisher
- Jodhi May as Tania
- Máté Haumann (as Mate Haumann) as Work Experience
- Anna Chancellor as Dana
- Burn Gorman as Bus Driver
- Ian Hanmore as Drunk
- Raymond Coulthard as Chris
- Mike Kelly as Party Bore
- Philip Jackson as Mr. Barker
- Kate Ashfield as Becka
- Martin Hancock as Stan
- Stewart Wright as Harry
- David Oyelowo as Graham
- Matt Devere as Gordon
- Lili Bordán as Gretchen
- Keara Murphy as Ellen
- Linda Fekete as Sue
- Jane How as Ms Parker

== Music ==
- "Vanishing Point" — James Edward Barker & Tim Despic
- "Think I Am You" — James Edward Barker & Tim Despic
- "Stop Signs" — James Edward Barker & Tim Despic
- "Best Dream" — James Edward Barker & Tim Despic
- "Left Alone Among the Living" — Spearmint
- "Beautiful Thing" — Spearmint
- "You Were Always Happy" — Spearmint
- "Perfect Love Song" — The Divine Comedy
- "Breathe Me" — Sia
- "Hurry Up Let's Go" — Shout Out Louds
- "Boys Will Be Boys" — The Ordinary Boys
- "Jerk It Out" — Caesars
- "Light and Day/Reach for the Sun" — The Polyphonic Spree
- "Lager n Lime" — The Blueskins
- "Somewhere Across Forever" — Stellastarr*
- "Into the Fire" — Thirteen Senses
- "Pain on Pain" — Feeder
- "Less Talk More Action!" — Tim Deluxe
- "If You Find Yourself Caught in Love" — Belle and Sebastian
- "George" — Veneration Music
- "Best Loop" — Veneration Music
- "Best Up 12" — Veneration Music
- "Think I Am You (x2 Remix)" — Veneration Music

== Critical reception ==
Writing for Reel Film Reviews, David Nusair gave a positive review in which he praised chemistry between Townsend and Smart, and also noted the screenwriters are "keenly aware of the sort of movie they're making - as evidenced by their willingness to poke fun at the [romcom] genre's various conventions". William Thomas of Empire said the film has an "occasional amusing set-piece and a decent turn from the two male leads", but criticized Smart in the leading lady role.
