= Ingenious (2009 British film) =

- Written by: Jeanette Winterson
- Directed by: Brian Kelly
- Starring: Hannah Godfrey; Leah Sheshadri; Keaton Lansley; Amit Shah; Una Stubbs; David Calder
- Country of origin: United Kingdom
- Original language: English

Production
- Producers: Rebecca Hodgson, Lime Pictures
- Running time: 58 minutes

Original release
- Network: BBC One
- Release: 25 December 2009

Ingenious is a one-off drama produced by Lime Pictures and written especially for CBBC by Jeanette Winterson. It premiered on BBC One.

== Cast ==
- Sally – Hannah Godfrey
- Spikey – Keaton Lansley
- Patch – Leah Sheshadri
- Genius – Amit Shah
- Gransha – Una Stubbs
- Lucas Summer – David Calder
- Derek Reckitt – Ian Puleston-Davies
- Samantha – Christine Tremarco
- Ma O'Blimey – Vicky Licorish
- Willie O'Blimey – Oliver Sawyers
- Wallie O'Blimey – Reece Douglas
- Raine Reckitt – Ellen Gallagher
- Royce Reckitt – Anna Bray
- Inspector – Emma Edmonson
- Reporter – Jude Vause
- Twin #1 – Harry Moss
- Twin #2 – Ryan Moss
