= Murder Before Evensong =

British television series

- Genre: Crime drama
- Based on: Murder Before Evensong by Richard Coles
- Screenplay by: Nick Hicks-Beach
- Directed by: David Moore
- Starring: Matthew Lewis; Amanda Redman; Amit Shah; Adam James
- Country of origin: United Kingdom
- Original language: English
- No. of series: 1
- No. of episodes: 6

Production
- Executive producers: Richard Coles; Radford Neville; Catherine Mackin; Don Klees; Paul Testar
- Running time: 50 minutes
- Production company: The Lighthouse

Original release
- Network: Acorn TV; Channel 5
- Release: 29 September 2025 – present

Murder Before Evensong is a British crime drama television series. It is based on the 2022 novel of the same name by Richard Coles. The series premiered on Acorn TV in the United States on 29 September 2025 and began showing on Channel 5 in the United Kingdom on 7 October 2025.

== Premise ==
Old secrets risk getting flushed out of a sleepy village with the church at its centre as a long-suffering priest investigates a murder spree.

== Cast ==
- Matthew Lewis as Canon Daniel Clement
- Amanda Redman as Audrey Clement, his mother
- Amit Shah as DS Neil Vanloo
- Adam James as Bernard de Floures
- Meghan Treadway as Honor de Floures
- Alexander Delamain as Alex de Floures
- Marion Bailey as Kath Sharman
- Amanda Hadingue as Dora Sharman
- Tamzin Outhwaite as Stella Harper
- Francis Magee as Edgy
- Nina Toussaint-White as Jane Thwaite
- Ben Batt as Ned Thwaite
- Sam Baker-Jones as Nathan Liversedge
- Emma Beattie as Margaret Porteous
- Ken Bones as Bishop Creggan

== Episodes ==
| No. | Title | Directed by | Written by | Original release date |
|---|---|---|---|---|
| 1 | "Episode 1" | David Moore | Nick Hicks-Beach | 29 September 2025 |
| 2 | "Episode 2" | David Moore | Nick Hicks-Beach | 6 October 2025 |
| 3 | "Episode 3" | David Moore | Nick Hicks-Beach | 13 October 2025 |
| 4 | "Episode 4" | David Moore | Nick Hicks-Beach | 20 October 2025 |
| 5 | "Episode 5" | David Moore | Nick Hicks-Beach | 27 October 2025 |
| 6 | "Episode 6" | David Moore | Nick Hicks-Beach | 3 November 2025 |

== Production ==
The series was commissioned by Acorn TV and Channel 5 in November 2024. The series is produced by The Lighthouse, with Nick Hicks-Beach adapting the 2022 book of the same name by Richard Coles, and David Moore as director. Coles is an executive producer alongside Radford Neville, Catherine Mackin, Don Klees, and Paul Testar.

The cast is led by Matthew Lewis as Canon Daniel Clement, and also includes Amanda Redman, Amit Shah, Adam James, Marion Bailey, Tamzin Outhwaite, Francis Magee and Nina Toussaint-White.

Both Redman and Outhwaite had previously appeared in the BBC crime drama New Tricks, portraying Detective Superintendent (Det Supt) Sandra Pullman and Detective Chief Inspector (DCI) Sasha Miller respectively.

Filming began in February 2025 in the West Midlands, England and was scheduled for 13 weeks. Filming locations included Mary Stevens Park in Stourbridge; Chillington Hall in South Staffordshire; Dudmaston Hall, in Bridgnorth, Shropshire; the former Express and Star newspaper offices in Wolverhampton, Claverley and Welford-on-Avon.

== Broadcast ==
The series was released on Acorn TV in the US and Canada from 29 September 2025 and broadcast in the United Kingdom on Channel 5 from 7 October 2025.
