= The Tournament (2009 film) =

- Theatrical poster
- Directed by: Scott Mann
- Written by: Gary Young; Jonathan Frank; Nick Rowntree
- Produced by: Keith Bell; Glenn M. Stewart; Gina Fegan
- Starring: Robert Carlyle; Kelly Hu; Ian Somerhalder; Liam Cunningham; Ving Rhames; Sébastien Foucan; Scott Adkins
- Cinematography: Emil Topuzov
- Edited by: Rob Hall
- Music by: Laura Karpman
- Distributed by: AV Pictures (worldwide); Entertainment Film Distributors (UK)
- Release date: October 20, 2009
- Running time: 97 minutes
- Countries: United Kingdom; United States
- Language: English
- Budget: $8 million
- Box office: $493,459

The Tournament is a 2009 independent action thriller film, directed by Scott Mann in his feature directorial debut. The film was conceived by Jonathan Frank and Nick Rowntree while at the University of Teesside with Mann. The script was written by Gary Young, Jonathan Frank, and Nick Rowntree.

The Tournament was partially filmed in Bulgaria, and numerous locations around Northern England (where the film is set) and Merseyside. The film stars Robert Carlyle, Ving Rhames, Kelly Hu, Sébastien Foucan, Liam Cunningham, Scott Adkins, Camilla Power and Ian Somerhalder. The film received additional funding internationally, from Sherezade Film Development, Storitel Production and others, earning the film a budget of just under £4,000,000, and the film also features an international ensemble cast.

However, numerous problems involving production, finance (the budget ran out twice), and securing a distributor, meant the film was not released until two years after filming, in late 2009.

== Plot ==
A group of the world's wealthiest and most powerful men, who are themselves tied into law enforcement agencies and criminal underworlds alike and who also control the international media with their billions, have devised the ultimate entertainment for themselves, simply referred to as "The Tournament." The Tournament takes place at intervals of every 7 years in an unspecified location, usually a large city.

The "Contestants" volunteer, but due to the nature of the tournament, they are some of the toughest or craziest individuals on the planet. They are expected to kill, as only the last surviving combatant will win the cash prize of $10 million. The men and women running the tournament not only view it as entertainment, but also bet high stakes on the outcome as a massive gambling tournament, serving as a source of excitement for the billionaires.

For each tournament, combatants are selected from the world's special forces, serial killers, athletes, trained contract killers, and assassins. The last combatant standing receives the cash prize and the glory and reputation of having the title of World's Number 1, which carries the legendary "million-dollar-a-bullet" contract killing price tag. Each contestant carries a tracking device, embedded under their skin, allowing the observers to monitor their movements and the contestants to track each other. The tournament lasts 24 hours, and the tracking devices will explode if no one has won.

The mayhem that takes place is passed off as natural disasters, terrorist outrages, accidents, or put down to rampages committed by lone madmen. The unsuspecting towns where the tournament occurs are randomly selected, and the public never knows its existence. This year, the latest tournament has come to Middlesbrough, a town in the United Kingdom - the country with the most prevalent mass surveillance in the world so that the events of the tournament can be easily followed and recorded through the ever-present CCTV as well as satellite surveillance. They also jam the emergency services' communications, completely taking over the electronic infrastructure, and the stage is set.

The current tournament becomes complex due to the actions of the organizers and competitors. Not only has Joshua Harlow, the winner of the last Tournament, been convinced to return because his wife was murdered. He's informed that the killer is in the Tournament. Still, another contestant, the Frenchman Anton Bogart, manages to remove his tracking chip, dropping it in a cup of coffee just in time for Father Joseph MacAvoy, a priest struggling with alcoholism and a crisis of faith, to drink it. With his only ally, assassin Lai Lai Zhen, seeking to escape the game after her last kill, MacAvoy must race to survive before the timer runs down.

Joshua Harlow finds out in the course of the film who murdered his wife. It was Lai Lai Zhen, who had been commissioned by the organizer, Powers, with Zhen's decision to 'retire' if she wins the Tournament due to the knowledge that Harlow's wife was the first target she had who genuinely didn't know why anyone would want her dead. Removing Zhen's tracker while the two are off-camera, Harlow confronts Powers and learns that he killed Harlow's wife to provoke Harlow to return to the Tournament, reasoning that he was the kind of man who 'should' die on the battlefield. Having received his answer, Harlow forces Zhen's tracker down Powers' throat, blowing them both up in the middle of the conference room of the watching millionaires. Lai Lai Zhen and Father MacAvoy are the only survivors of the game. At the end of the film, it is shown that Father MacAvoy is once again working as a priest and has defeated his alcohol addiction.

== Cast ==
- Robert Carlyle as Father Joseph MacAvoy
- Kelly Hu as Lai Lai Zhen
- Ian Somerhalder as Miles Slade
- Liam Cunningham as Mr. Powers
- Ving Rhames as Joshua Harlow
- Sébastien Foucan as Anton Bogart
- Scott Adkins as Yuri Petrov
- Andy Nyman as Tech Eddie
- Iddo Goldberg as Tech Rob
- Craig Conway as Steve Tomko
- John Lynch as Gene Walker
- J. J. Perry as Montoya
- Camilla Power as Sarah Hunter
- Nick Rowntree as Eddy Cusack
- Rachel Grant as Lina Sophia
- Bashar Rahal as Asaf
- Dustin Ingle as Bill Gaytes

== Production ==
In July 2007, Entertainment Film Distributors acquired UK rights to distribute The Tournament by first-time director Scott Mann. Filming began in Bulgaria on 11 July 2007. The Tournament was also filmed in the United Kingdom in Manchester and on Teesside in the town of Middlesbrough and the surrounding area, including Newton Aycliffe and Billingham the rooftop scenes are filmed in the town St.Helens. Like most independent movies, The Tournament has not been without hardship. Despite running out of money twice, once leaving the director stranded in Bulgaria, it eventually got enough funding to finish filming completely and finally complete post-production.

The film was chosen to open the Screamfest Horror Film Festival in the Mann's Chinese Theatre on 16 October 2009.

== Soundtrack ==
Laura Karpman composed the musical score, with additional music by George Acogny, John Hunter and James Edward Barker. The film also contained music from: Ruth Jacott, Fabian "R-CANE" Schlosser, Kevin Hissink, and El Rod.

== Critical reception ==
Staci Layne Wilson, of Horror.com, gave a positive review for the film, noting that despite the plot and script lacking originality, it could be compared to films such as Smokin' Aces and The Running Man. She wrote: "[The Tournament] truly lives up to its "non-stop action" premise... ...the only other two recently released movies I can think of to top it in that arena would be the Crank films and the absolutely awesome Shoot 'Em Up."
