= Lean on Pete =

2017 film by Andrew Haigh

- Theatrical release poster
- Directed by: Andrew Haigh
- Screenplay by: Andrew Haigh
- Based on: Lean on Pete by Willy Vlautin
- Produced by: Tristan Goligher
- Starring: Charlie Plummer; Chloë Sevigny; Travis Fimmel; Steve Buscemi
- Cinematography: Magnus Joenck
- Edited by: Jonathan Alberts
- Music by: James Edward Barker
- Production companies: The Bureau; Film4; BFI
- Distributed by: Curzon
- Release dates: 1 September 2017 (Venice); 4 May 2018 (United Kingdom)
- Running time: 121 minutes
- Country: United Kingdom
- Language: English
- Budget: $8 million
- Box office: $2.5 million

Lean on Pete is a 2017 British coming-of-age drama film written and directed by Andrew Haigh, based on the novel of the same name by Willy Vlautin. It stars Charlie Plummer, Chloë Sevigny, Travis Fimmel and Steve Buscemi, and follows a 15-year-old boy in the American Northwest, who begins to work at a stable and befriends a racehorse.

It was screened in the main competition section of the 74th Venice International Film Festival, where it won the Marcello Mastroianni Award for Best Young Actor or Actress for Plummer. It was released in the United States on 6 April 2018, by A24, before opening in the United Kingdom on 4 May 2018, by Curzon. It received highly positive critical reviews, with praise going towards its direction, screenplay, cinematography, and Plummer's performance. The National Board of Review named it one of the ten best independent films of 2018.

== Plot ==
While out on a morning run by a race track, Charley Thompson, a 15-year-old who has just moved with his dysfunctional single father Ray to Portland, Oregon, finds casual work looking after a racehorse named 'Lean On Pete'. Pete's owner, Del, is an ornery man who assigns all the grunt work at the stables to Charley, but also attempts to bond by gifting him a pair of boots and teaching table manners. Charley opens up about not knowing his birth mother, and how his father does not let him see Aunt Margy, Charley's only maternal figure.

One night, a Samoan man breaks into Charley's home and attacks Ray for sleeping with his wife. Ray is pushed through a window and gets seriously hurt by the glass shards. He is taken to hospital, and it becomes clear that Ray is suffering from a serious septic infection. Despite Charley's insistence on staying by his side, Ray encourages Charley to leave for a job with Del.

Del's top jockey, Bonnie, races Pete and wins. However, even doped, Pete is getting too old for racing and will soon be sold to be slaughtered in Mexico. Returning home, Charley learns that Ray has succumbed to the complications and died. Charley is given Ray's belt and then escapes from the hospital before Social Services can be called to collect him. The following night, Pete loses his race and gets sold. Charley confronts Del and Bonnie, who collectively shrug off Charley's request to buy Pete. Charley then takes Del's keys and steals the horse, along with Del's truck, and heads for Wyoming in search of his Aunt Margy.

After a few days on the road, Charley runs out of money and resorts to siphoning gas and dining-and-dashing in order to survive. The truck then breaks down on a highway, and he continues on foot through the desert, leading Pete. Together, they stumble upon the home of Mike and Dallas, two Army veterans, who offer food and shelter. Charley feels apprehensive and sneaks out in the middle of the night after refilling his water jug. The next day, Pete is spooked by some motorcycles and bolts onto a desert road where the horse gets hit by a car and killed. As Charley mourns Pete's death, the police arrive and try to help him, but he flees the scene.

After reaching a new town, Charley breaks into a house in search of water and where to launder his clothes. He wanders the streets as a homeless youth before being taken in by a destitute couple, Silver and Martha; Silver scoffs at Charley's attempts to find work. Despite his disheveled appearance, Charley finds work painting houses and starts saving in order to get to Wyoming. One day Silver attacks Charley for the money and kicks him out of their shared trailer. Charley obtains a crowbar, beats Silver up and retrieves his savings. He takes a bus to Laramie, Wyoming, where he locates the town's public library and reunites with his Aunt Margy.

That night, Charley struggles to fall asleep. He visits his aunt in her room, confesses the crimes he has committed throughout his journey, and reveals that he suffers from nightmares about the deaths of both Pete and Ray. Aunt Margy consoles Charley as he bursts into tears. Some time later, Charley goes on a morning run and stops to look around the neighborhood. Finally safe in life, he can stop running – but he seems unsure of how to process this newfound safety.

== Cast ==
- Charlie Plummer as Charley Thompson, Ray’s son
- Travis Fimmel as Ray Thompson, Charley’s dad
- Chloë Sevigny as Bonnie, a jockey
- Steve Buscemi as Del Montgomery, horse trainer
- Steve Zahn as Silver
- Amy Seimetz as Lynn, Ray’s love interest
- Alison Elliott as Aunt Margy
- Justin Rain as Mike
- Lewis Pullman as Dallas
- Frank Gallegos as Santiago
- Julia Prud'homme as Ruby
- Kurt Conroyd as Nurse
- Bob Olin as Mr. Kendall
- Teyah Hartley as Laurie
- Rachael Perrell Fosket as Martha
- Jason Rouse as Mitch

== Production ==
In May 2015, it was announced Andrew Haigh would write and direct the film, based on the novel of the same name, with Tristan Goligher producing the film under his The Bureau banner, alongside Film4 Productions. In July 2016, Steve Buscemi was cast in the film, as well as Charlie Plummer, Chloë Sevigny, and Travis Fimmel. In September 2016, Steve Zahn, Amy Seimetz and Thomas Mann joined the cast.

James Edward Barker composed the film's score.

=== Filming ===
Principal photography began on 13 August 2016, and took place in Portland and Burns, Oregon. Filming concluded on 10 September 2016. Among the locations was Portland Meadows racetrack, named Portland Downs in the film.

=== Post-production ===
During post-production, Thomas Mann's role was cut entirely.

== Release ==
In May 2016, A24 and Curzon Artificial Eye acquired North American and UK and Irish distribution rights, respectively; among the other distributors the film was sold to was Focus Features, which acquired the film for German-speaking territories, Scandinavia and most of Asia and Eastern Europe. The film had its world premiere at the Venice Film Festival on 1 September 2017. It also screened at the Toronto International Film Festival on 10 September 2017 and the BFI London Film Festival on 5 October 2017.

The film was initially scheduled to be released in the United States on 30 March 2018, however it was pushed back a week to 6 April, and was released in the United Kingdom on 4 May 2018.

== Reception ==
=== Critical response ===
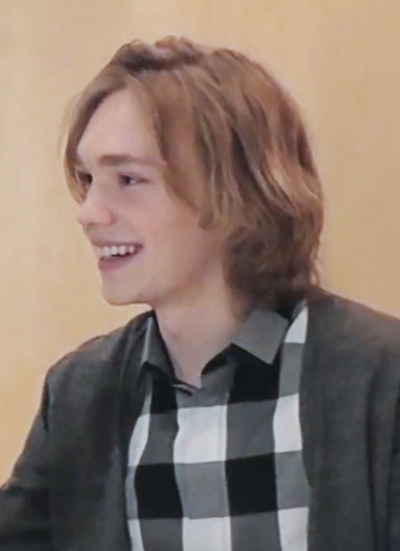
Charlie Plummer received critical acclaim for his performance as Charley Thompson.

Lean on Pete received highly positive critical reviews. On the review aggregator website Rotten Tomatoes, 90% of 189 critics' reviews are positive. The website's consensus reads: "Lean on Pete avoids mawkish melodrama, offering an empathetic yet clear-eyed portrayal of a young man at a crossroads that confirms Charlie Plummer as a major talent." Metacritic, which uses a weighted average, assigned the film a score of 80 out of 100, based on 44 critics, indicating "generally favorable" reviews.

Brian Tallerico of RogerEbert.com gave the film 3 1/2 stars, saying "I marveled at the humanist depth of the world Haigh creates, one that can only be rendered by a truly great writer and director, working near the top of his game." Austin Dale of INTO named the film the best of 2018 while grieving its modest box office returns, calling it "both the most American film of the year and the year’s toughest sell."

Charlie Plummer received widespread praise for his performance, with Stephanie Zacharek of Time writing his "unstudied grace is the movie’s greatest gift". Haigh's direction and Magnus Joenck's cinematography was similarly lauded, with Jeffrey Bloomer of Slate commending how the film "slowly becomes a riveting chronicle of survival" and captures moments that are "observational, stoic, but also quietly tender".

Critics welcomed the film's departure from other "boy and his horse"-type movies, though others noted the film's unsparing plot may prove to be too downbeat for some audiences. Leah Greenblatt of Entertainment Weekly wrote, "As Charley's situation becomes increasingly precarious, the movie also becomes a meditation not just on what it is to live on the social and economic fringes in America, but how easy it is to slip through the cracks entirely. That may feel like a bait and switch to viewers who just came for some nice boy-and-his-horse uplift, but Pete is no kind of fairytale; instead, it’s something far sadder and better and more real."

=== Accolades ===
Year	Award	Category	Recipient(s)	Result	Ref.
2017	Les Arcs Film Festival	Best Actor	Charlie Plummer	Won	
2017	Les Arcs Film Festival	Best Cinematography	Magnus Nordenhof Jønck	Won	
2017	Les Arcs Film Festival	Best Original Score	James Edward Barker	Won	
2017	Les Arcs Film Festival	Cristal Arrow	Lean on Pete	Won	
2017	London Film Festival	Best Film	Lean on Pete	Nominated	
2017	Venice Film Festival	Golden Lion	Lean on Pete	Nominated	
2017	Venice Film Festival	Marcello Mastroianni Award	Charlie Plummer	Won	
2018	British Independent Film Awards	Best Actor	Charlie Plummer	Nominated	
2018	British Independent Film Awards	Best Supporting Actor	Steve Buscemi	Nominated	
2018	British Independent Film Awards	Best Director	Andrew Haigh	Nominated	
2018	British Independent Film Awards	Best Cinematography	Magnus Nordenhof Jønck	Nominated	
2018	Dublin Film Critics Circle	Best Actor	Charlie Plummer	Won	
2018	Greater WNY Film Critics Association Awards	Best Actor	Charlie Plummer	Nominated	
2018	Heartland International Film Festival	Truly Moving Picture	Lean on Pete	Won	
2018	Indiana Film Journalists Association	Best Actor	Charlie Plummer	Nominated	
2018	International Cinephile Society	Best Picture Not Released in 2017	Lean on Pete	Won	
2018	International Online Cinema Awards	Best Actor	Charlie Plummer	Nominated	
2018	Jerusalem Film Festival	Best International Film	Lean on Pete	Nominated	
2018	Luxembourg City Film Festival	Youth Jury Award	Lean on Pete	Won	
2018	Luxembourg City Film Festival	Grand Prix	Lean on Pete	Nominated	
2018	National Board of Review	Top Ten Independent Films	Lean on Pete	Won	
2018	San Diego Film Critics Society Awards	Best Cinematography	Magnus Nordenhof Jønck	Nominated	
2018	San Diego Film Critics Society Awards	Best Breakthrough Artist	Charlie Plummer	Runner-up	
2018	World Soundtrack Awards	Public Choice Award	James Edward Barker	Nominated	
2019	Chlotrudis Awards	Best Actor	Charlie Plummer	Nominated	
2019	CinEuphoria Awards	Top Ten of the Year	Lean on Pete	Won	
2019	CinEuphoria Awards	Best Film	Lean on Pete	Nominated	
2019	National Film Awards UK	Best Independent Film	Lean on Pete	Nominated	
2019	National Film Awards UK	Best Supporting Actor	Steve Buscemi	Nominated	

== See also ==
- List of films about horses
- List of films about horse racing
