= Dark Realm =

- Genre: Anthology
- Directed by: Jim Threapleton; Charles Neames; Eric Summer; Malcolm Cross
- Presented by: Eric Roberts
- Theme music composer: Frédéric Porte
- Countries of origin: Canada; France; United States
- Original language: English
- No. of seasons: 1
- No. of episodes: 13

Production
- Camera setup: Single-camera
- Running time: 45–48 minutes
- Production company: Warner Brothers

Original release
- Network: Syndication
- Release: May 26 – December 15, 2001

Dark Realm is an anthology series hosted by Eric Roberts. The series aired in syndication in the United States for a total of 13 episodes, from May to December 2001.

== Episodes ==
1. "Castle Keep" - A love triangle between students and a professor on an archaeological dig turns deadly as they conduct a dig in a haunted castle. This episode features Miranda Raison.
2. "She's the One" - A man tries to rescue his beauty-obsessed girlfriend from undergoing extensive plastic surgery at a sinister spa.
3. "Organizer 2000" - After causing an accident that kills his long-time crush, a young man is given an electronic organizer that takes him back in time to experience scenes from his life with her.
4. "Party On" - Two brothers looking for a party stumble into purgatory.
5. "Exposure" - A ruthless investment banker makes a deal with the Devil.
6. "Skin Deep" - An innocent young woman undergoes a personality change after being bitten by a were-tiger.
7. "See No Evil" - A genuine crystal ball makes business boom for a phony psychic.
8. "The Housesitter" - A college student housesitting for a cranky woman finds the situation getting out of control as she copes with mysterious warnings, odd neighbors, and an escaped killer who seems to be filling the local park with body parts. Featuring Christina Cox and Peter Guinness.
9. "Johnny's Guitar" - A struggling musician discovers the secret — and the curse — behind a music legend when he inherits the man's demonic instrument. The episode featured Def Leppard singer Joe Elliott, and Corey Feldman.
10. "Murder One" - A lawyer finds himself in the middle of a nest of vampires when he joins a local law firm.
11. "Emma's Boy" - A couple expecting their first child pays a visit to the wife's ancestral land and encounters evil.
12. "Blackout (Part 1)" - An amnesiac takes his new bride to visit his childhood home, but a stranger with a terribly familiar face leads to an argument between the newlyweds.
13. "Blackout (Part 2)" - Brad's shocking recollection has landed him in jail for murder, but his suspicions are aroused when he realizes that no one around him is who they claim to be.

== Syndication ==
Dark Realm aired on the Chiller network in the United States in 2009.

The series is currently available for streaming online on Tubi, The Roku Channel and Plex.
