= Mamdouh Adwan =

Syrian writer and critic (1941–2004)

Mamdouh Adwan ممدوح عدوان
- Born: 23 November 1941; Qayrun near Masyaf, Hama, Syria
- Died: 19 December 2004 (aged 63); Damascus, Syria
- Occupations: Poet, writer and translator
- Writing career
- Period: 1965–2004

Mamdouh Adwan (Arabic: ممدوح عدوان, 23 November 1941 – 19 December 2004) was a prolific Syrian writer, poet, playwright and critic. He published his first collection of poetry, al-Dhul al-Akhdhar [The Green Shadow] in 1967 and afterwards published 18 further collections.

He also published two novels, twenty-five plays, translated twenty-three books from English into Arabic, including the Iliad, the Odyssey, a biography of George Orwell, the Report to Greco by Nikos Kazantzakis, and wrote a number of television series. He wrote regularly on Arab current affairs, and also taught at the Higher Institute for Dramatic Arts in Damascus. Only few of his works have been published in English, notably in Banipal magazine.

== Biography ==
Mamdouh Adwan was born in the village of Qayrun near Masyaf, Hama Governorate, the first child of Sabri Adwan. After finishing his schooling in Masyaf, he moved to Damascus to study English literature at Damascus University. He was married and had two sons. One of them, Ziad Adwan, is a theatre director, actor and author.

== Works in English translation ==
- The old man and the land. Damascus : al-Tawjih Press, 1971.
- Selected poems. (2008) translated by Sinan Antoon, Banipal 32
