= Extraordinary Rendition (film) =

- Film poster
- Directed by: Jim Threapleton
- Written by: Jim Threapleton
- Produced by: Andy Noble
- Starring: Omar Berdouni; Andy Serkis
- Music by: James Edward Barker
- Release date: 2007
- Running time: 77 minutes
- Country: United Kingdom
- Language: English

Extraordinary Rendition is a 2007 drama film directed by Jim Threapleton and starring Omar Berdouni and Andy Serkis. The film was premiered at the Locarno Film Festival, Switzerland on 8 August 2007, and at the Edinburgh Film Festival on 21 August 2007, but never received a full commercial release. It was released on DVD in early 2008, and screened by the BBC on 30 April 2008.

== Plot ==
A man is snatched from the streets of his home city (London) and transported to an unknown destination. Held in a tiny cell with no access to legal representation, he is cut off from the outside world. Advanced interrogation techniques are used to break him down. His life is deconstructed with such manipulation that even he begins to question his innocence. He is transported again, in a small jet marked only 'N379P', to the searing heat of an unspecified locale where interrogation is quickly replaced by sophisticated torture. No reason is offered for his detention and no timetable is set for his release. No governments are mentioned, no radical factions named, no fingers pointed. There is nothing for him to hang onto. The man has fallen out of the world, and only questions remain. Returned without explanation to the UK many months later, he is left to pick up the pieces of a shattered life in a world he no longer recognizes.

== Cast ==
- Omar Berdouni
- Andy Serkis
- Ania Sowinski
- Jimmy Yuill
- Hugh Ross
- Rami Hilmi
- Adam Cumberbatch

== Reception ==
The film received mixed reviews. Ray Bennett of The Hollywood Reporter called it ''a powerful debut film.''

== See also ==
- Rendition
