= Alvarez Kings =

English indiepop band

- Origin: South Yorkshire, England
- Genres: pop
- Years active: 2013–present
- Labels: Sire Records; Warner Bros.
- Members: Simon Thompson; Paul Thompson; Aidan Thompson; Richard Walker
- Past members: Sean Parkin
- Website: alvarezkings.com

Alvarez Kings is an English indiepop band from South Yorkshire, England that is currently signed to Sire Records, an imprint of Warner Bros. Records. The band released its major label debut, Somewhere Between, in April 2017.

== History ==
Alvarez Kings began forming in Sheffield, South Yorkshire around 2011 with brothers Simon and Paul Thompson making up the core duo. Richard Walker and Aidan Thompson would join the band later due to the departures of two original band members. The band began playing in its current form in 2013. In that year, it travelled on the Vans Warped Tour and was profiled for the second season of the Fuse TV series, Warped Roadies. BBC Radio Sheffield named the band's song, "No Resolve," the "Single of the Year."

In 2015, Alvarez Kings signed to Sire Records, an imprint of Warner Bros. Records. It released its first EP with the label, Fear to Feel, in June 2015. That year, the band also toured with and opened for Echosmith and joined the Warped Tour again. In April 2016, Alvarez Kings went on a short UK tour with PVRIS and K. Flay. The band also opened for Melanie Martinez on her Cry Baby Tour throughout North America and Europe in 2016.

Preceded by the introductory focus track "Sleepwalking Pt.II" their debut album, Somewhere Between (Sire Records/Warner Bros. Records), was released June 2017, produced by the Grammy Award winning producer, Carlos de la Garza. The album went on to cement the band as a serious contender for their unique brand of indie-pop gems and a growing army of dedicated fans around the world. The album was backed up with headline tours in the US, Europe and the UK.

Upon Sean Parkin's departure, the band later asked record producer Aidan Thompson to join the band after his work on their single "Get up and Move On".

== Discography ==
=== Studio albums ===
List of studio albums with selected album details
Title	Details
Somewhere Between	Released: April 2017 (US, UK); Label: Sire/Warner Bros.; Formats: CD, Digital download

=== EPs ===
List of EPs with selected album details
Title	Details	Cover Art
Fear to Feel	Released: June 2015 (US, UK); Label: Sire/Warner Bros.; Formats: CD, Digital download	Fear To Feel by Alvarez Kings
