= Ziad Adwan =

Syrian theatre director, actor and writer

- Citizenship: Syria
- Education: Royal Academy of Dramatic Art, Royal Holloway, University of London
- Occupations: Theatre director, actor, writer
- Known for: Theatre productions with refugees, actor in Steven Spielberg's Munich (2005 film)
- Movement: Street theatre, community theatre

Ziad Adwan is a Syrian theatre director, actor, author and academic. His work as director focuses on street theatre and projects with refugees. He has also published articles on the Syrian and Middle Eastern theatre scene. Adwan works in the fields of theatre practice, teaching and research and lives in Germany. His father was the Syrian poet and playwright Mamdouh Adwan.

== Life and career ==
Mamdouh Adwan (1941–2004), Ziad's father, was a prominent Syrian journalist, poet and playwright. His extensive body of work includes several socially critical plays, some of which fell victim to censorship because they contained historical parallels with current events.

Ziad Adwan completed a master's degree in Text and Performance Studies at the Royal Academy of Dramatic Art (RADA) and King's College London. He then went on to earn a PhD in Theatre Studies from Royal Holloway, University of London. His dissertation focused on errors and misperceptions in cultural performances and their significance for theatre and performance.

=== Artistic activity ===
Adwan has worked as director, actor and author for theatre and performance projects. In Damascus, he was the artistic director of the "Invisible Stories" project, a series of street theatre performances in various districts of the Syrian capital.

In Germany, he has run workshops with refugees who re-enacted their experiences of flight. In 2016, he participated in the Open Border Festival, a German-Syrian theatre project in collaboration with the Munich Kammerspiele. Adwan's play titled Please, Repeat After Me was performed at the HochX Theater und Live Art in Munich in 2018 and at the Englisches Theater in Berlin the following year. As actor, Adwan has appeared in Steven Spielberg's feature film Munich and Antonia Bird's docudrama The Hamburg Cell, among others.

=== Teaching and research ===
Between 2009 and 2013, Adwan was a lecturer at the Higher Institute of Dramatic Arts in Damascus. There, he taught performance theory, mask and acting techniques, among other subjects, combining practical training with approaches from theatre studies. In his academic publications, Adwan focuses on the professionalisation and institutionalisation of theatre in the Middle East since the mid-20th century. He has been involved in international research projects on global theatre history, including "Developing Theatre – Building Expert Networks for Theatre in Emerging Countries after 1945" at LMU Munich.

After the outbreak of the Syrian civil war, Adwan left Damascus in 2013. He initially worked in Abu Dhabi as an acting coach and dramaturge and taught in workshops in several European countries, the Middle East and the United States, including with refugee artists. He was also involved in founding the Tanween Company for Theatre and Dance in Damascus in 2009.

== Publications ==
Adwan has published academic articles on the Syrian and Middle Eastern theatre scene and on cultural institutions such as the Damascus Opera House and the local Higher Institute of Dramatic Arts.

- Adwan, Ziad (2012). The Opera House in Damascus and the State of Exception in Syria. Vol. 32. Cambridge University Press. pp. 231–243. doi:10.1017/S0266464X1600021X.
- Adwan, Ziad (2017). Flying above Bloodshed: Performative Protest in the Scared City of Damascus. Vol. 5. Berghahn Journals. doi:10.3167/cont.2017.050103. ISSN 2572-7184.
- Adwan, Ziad (2019). "Imaginary Theatre Professionalising Theatre in the Levant 1940-1990". Open Access LMU (1). doi:10.5282/GTHJ/5106.
- Adwan, Ziad (2020). Balme, Christopher; Leonhardt, Nic (eds.). "The New out of Nothing. The Workshop between the Liminal and the Liminoid". Developing Theatre. 2020 (3). Ludwig-Maximilians-Universität München, Munich – via www.developingtheatre.theaterwissenschaft.uni-muenchen.de.
- Adwan, Ziad (2020). "'The place of intellectuals': The Higher Institute of Dramatic Arts in Damascus between dictatorship and the market". Journal of Global Theatre History. 4 (1). The Higher Institute of Dramatic Arts, LMU Munich: 37–54. doi:10.5282/GTHJ/5124.
