= Jim Threapleton =

British painter and film director (born 1973)

- Born: James Edward Threapleton; 8 November 1973 (age 52); Wharfedale, England
- Occupations: Painter; film director; screenwriter; assistant director
- Years active: 1996–present
- Spouses: Kate Winslet (m. 1998; div. 2001) Julie Vuorinen (m. 2008)
- Children: 3, including Mia Threapleton

James Edward Threapleton (born 8 November 1973) is an English painter and former assistant director and film director. He worked as a third assistant director in films such as Hideous Kinky (1998), Don't Go Breaking My Heart (1999) and The Mummy (1999). He made his directorial and screenwriting debut with the film Extraordinary Rendition (2007). Since the 2010s, Threapleton has worked as a painter.

From 1998 to 2001, Threapleton was married to actress Kate Winslet, with whom he has a daughter, actress Mia Threapleton. Since 2008, he has been married to Julie Vuorinen, with whom he has two children.

== Early life ==
He is the son of RAF Officer Edward ‘Ted’ Threapleton and Louise Threapleton. From May 1998, his father was station commander of RAF Cranwell. His father was a Squadron Leader, formerly a Tornado navigator with 5 Squadron. The older of two boys, he has a younger brother, Robin.

When his father was at RAF Coningsby, he attended the private Clinton Park School, in East Lindsey until 1985, followed by Bedford Modern School.

He studied History of Art at the University of Manchester. He completed his Fine Art MA in 2010, earned a PhD in painting at Camberwell College of Arts, and earned his doctorate from the Chelsea College of Art in 2016.

== Career ==
Threapleton worked as a production runner on the television series Screen Two (1996) and Neverwhere (1996). He worked as a unit driver in the film The Tribe (1998). He then worked as an assistant director on the television film Gobble (1997), and as a third assistant director on the television series The Jump (1998), and in films such as The Governess (1998), Hideous Kinky (1998), Don't Go Breaking My Heart (1999) and The Mummy (1999).

In 2001, Threapleton directed one episode of the horror anthology series Dark Realm.

He made his feature directorial and screenwriting debut with the film Extraordinary Rendition (2007), starring Omar Berdouni and Andy Serkis, which premiered at the 2007 Locarno Film Festival.

Since the 2010s, Threapleton has worked as a painter in London and Vancouver and has held exhibitions of his works at several art galleries.

== Personal life ==
Threapleton began a relationship with actress Kate Winslet after meeting her on the set of Hideous Kinky (1998), in which he worked as a third assistant director. They married on 22 November 1998 in Reading, Berkshire, Winslet's hometown. They have a daughter, actress Mia Threapleton (b. 12 October 2000 in London). The couple separated in September 2001 and divorced on 13 December 2001.

In 2008, Threapleton married his second wife, Julie Vuorinen, a school administrator and teacher to special needs students. They have two daughters, Olivia, born in 2009, and Georgia, born in 2013.

As of 2022, Threapleton has lived between London and Vancouver.

== Filmography ==
=== As director ===
Year	Title	Notes
2001	Dark Realm	TV series; episode: "Party On"
2007	Extraordinary Rendition	Feature film; also screenwriter

=== As assistant director ===
Year	Title	Notes
1997	Gobble	Television film
1998	The Governess	Third assistant director
1998	The Jump	Television series; 4 episodes, third assistant director
1998	Hideous Kinky	Third assistant director
1999	Don't Go Breaking My Heart	Third assistant director
1999	The Mummy	Third assistant director

=== As production runner ===
Year	Title	Notes
1996	Screen Two	Television series; 1 episode
1996	Neverwhere	Miniseries; 2 episodes

=== As actor ===
Year	Title	Role	Notes
1998	Hideous Kinky	Man sitting on a wall	Uncredited
