= Max Adams =

British author (born 1961)

Max Adams is a British author, archaeologist, television presenter, and woodsman. His books cover a wide range of subjects from British history, to Arboriculture, and even his own novel. He currently manages his own young woodland in the north of England and has set up a not-for-profit partnership called "Woods for the Trees", which aims to bring together: people who would like to help cultivate healthy woodlands, with unused land that needs people's input and time. Adams also co-founded, and helps to organise, an archaeological adult-education program called "The Bernician Studies Group" who, among other pursuits, have performed an archaeological survey of monastic sites in Donegal.

== Life and career ==
=== Early life ===
Max was born in 1961 in London, to Warwick and Thelma Adams. As a boy, he lived and went to school in Twickenham. Max then moved north to study Archaeology at the University of York which led to his early career as an archaeologist. One of the excavations he was involved in was at Christchurch, Spitalfields; the findings of which he co-wrote and were published by the Council of British Archaeology. Afterwards, he spent several years as director of Archaeological Services at Durham University.

=== TV presenter ===
After moving to the north-east of England, Max began presenting documentaries for ITV's local television channel - Tyne Tees. Max wrote and presented "Heroes of the revolution" in 2003 which covered some of the north's industrial pioneers. In 2005, Max wrote and presented "Trafalgar's forgotten Hero"; a documentary about Newcastle born Admiral Cuthbert Collingwood, which accompanied his first major historical book publication

=== Literary work ===
==== Historical publications ====
Along with his work in TV, Max has written a number of historical works. Starting with "Admiral Collingwood: Nelson's own hero", a biography of Cuthbert Collingwood, who led the charge at the naval battle of Trafalgar. The book was published in 2005 by Weidenfeld & Nicolson and was then later reprinted by the publishers - Head of Zeus. Max was awarded a Churchill fellowship to support his travels required to research the life of the admiral

Following on from his first biography, Max then went on to write "The Prometheans: John Martin and the generation that stole the future", a look into the life and times of painter John Martin, as well a whole cast of other radical thinking men and women from the late 18th century. The Prometheans was published by Quercus in 2010 and was named a Guardian book of the week. Max also received an Elizabeth Longford award in aid of his research.

Max has also written a series of books centered on Dark Age Britain published by Head of Zeus; starting with "The King in the North: The life and times of Oswald of Northumbria", a biography of the Northumbrian king - Oswald. The King in the North was published in 2013 and was followed by "In the Land of Giants: Journey through the dark ages" in 2014, a book in which Max recounts his travels across Britain and links his experiences to the land's Dark Age past. For the book, Max was awarded a Roger Deakin award to support his research. In 2017, "Ælfred's Britain: War and peace in the Viking age" was published; a history of the British peoples during the period throughout which Viking raids and Invasions were common. Most recently in the series, published in 2021, is the book "The First Kingdom: Britain in the age of Arthur", which investigates post-Roman Britain and the political struggles within it.

In 2018, Head of Zeus also published Max's study of important women throughout history called "Unquiet Women: From the Dusk of the Roman Empire to the Dawn of the Enlightenment". The book covers a range of historical women: from Anglo-Saxon noblewoman Wynflæd to Mary Astell, the 17th century author and philosopher.

==== Wood-related publications ====
Max has also published a number of books relating to trees and woodlands. In "The Wisdom of Trees", published by Head of Zeus in 2014, is a sequence of essays, anecdotes and profiles of Britain's best-loved tree species, as well as humans' relationship with wood throughout history. Max also has written a book called "The Little Book of Planting Trees" which aims to serve as an informative and practical guide to tree planting. In 2019, Head of Zeus also published Max's most recent book on trees - "Trees of Life", a collection of texts covering many tree species and varieties

==== The Ambulist ====
In 2016 Max published his own novel, The Ambulist, under his own publishing company - Beat and Track. The thriller is centred on a mysterious figure who roams the Northumbrian countryside, pursued by people from his past. The book also contains illustrations by his mother, Thelma.

=== Woodland management ===
Max has owned and managed multiple woodlands since moving to the north of England. Currently, he has an 8-acre plantation of native broadleaves near to his home in County Durham. He is an active campaigner for the planting and studying of trees and woodlands. He recently helped set up a non-profit organisation called "Woods for the Trees" which describes itself as a "match-making service" for people who own unused or unproductive land, with people who would be eager to raise and manage small woodlands or orchards.

== List of publications ==
- Across the Styx (The Spitalfields Project, Vol. 1 : The Archaeology, CBA Research Reports): v. 1 (1993)
- Trafalgar's Lost Hero: Admiral Lord Collingwood and the Defeat of Napoleon (2005)
- Admiral Collingwood: Nelson's Own Hero (2005)
- Collingwood: Northumberland's Heart of Oak (2005)
- The Firebringers: Art, Science and the Struggle for Liberty in 19th Century Britain (2009)
- The Prometheans: John Martin and the generation that stole the future (2010)
- The King in the North: The Life and Times of Oswald of Northumbria. Bloomsbury Publishing. 29 August 2013. ISBN 978-1-78185-417-4.
- The Wisdom of Trees: A Miscellany (2014)
- In the Land of Giants: Journey through the dark ages (2015)
- The Ambulist (2016)
- Ælfred's Britain: War and Peace in the Viking Age (2017) (Published in the US as The Viking Wars: War and Peace in King Alfred's Britain: 789 - 955 (2018))
- Unquiet Women: From the Dusk of the Roman Empire to the Dawn of the Enlightenment (2018)
- The Little Book of Planting Trees (2019)
- Trees of Life (2019)
- The First Kingdom: Britain in the age of Arthur (2021)
- The Mercian Chronicles: King Offa and the Birth of the Anglo-Saxon State, AD 630-918. Bloomsbury Publishing. 13 February 2025. ISBN 978-1-83893-327-2. (published in the United States as The Birth of the Anglo-Saxons: Three Kings and a History of Britain at the Dawn of the Viking Age)

== TV appearances ==
- The Dig (1998) - Presenter
- Heroes of the Revolution (2003) - Presenter and Writer
- Trafalgar's Forgotten Hero (2005) - Presenter and Writer
