= Scott Mann (filmmaker) =

British film director and AI technologist

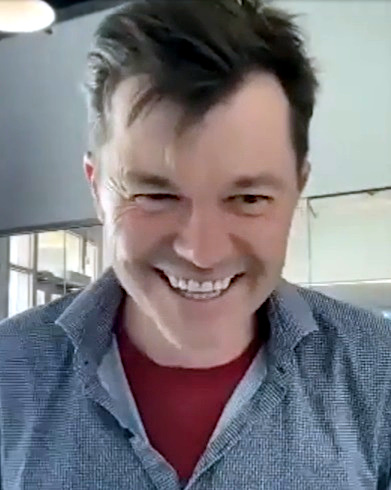
Scott Mann in 2022

Scott Mann is a British film director, screenwriter and technology entrepreneur. Originally from Newton Aycliffe, County Durham, he is co-founder and CEO of the AI company Flawless, which develops tools for film editing and dubbing. Mann is best known for directing films including The Tournament (2009), Heist (2015), Final Score (2018), and Fall (2022).

== Early life and education ==
Mann was born and raised in Newton Aycliffe, County Durham. He studied film and television production before entering television and film directing.

== Career ==
Mann began by directing short films such as Chaingangs (2003) and Tug of War (2006), the latter starring Julie Goodyear, Marsha Thomason and Scott Neal. He also directed programmes for Granada Television.

His feature directing debut was The Tournament (2009), a British action thriller starring Robert Carlyle, Ving Rhames, Kelly Hu, Ian Somerhalder and Scott Adkins. In 2011, he was attached to direct a contemporary remake of Seven Samurai for The Weinstein Company, but that version was never realized.

He later directed Heist (2015), originally titled Bus 657, starring Robert De Niro, Kate Bosworth, Jeffrey Dean Morgan and Dave Bautista. His subsequent films include Final Score (2018) and Fall (2022), which he co-wrote and which used AI-driven post-production techniques to modify dialogue and lip synchronization without reshoots.

== Flawless ==
In 2021, Mann co-founded Flawless with Nick Lynes, focusing on ethical AI for film editing and dubbing. The company's first tool, TrueSync, alters actors' lip movements to match re-recorded dialogue. It was named among Time's "Best Inventions of 2021".

Flawless later developed DeepEditor, integrating AI into editing workflows to modify visual and audio elements. In 2025, Time named Flawless among its "TIME100 Most Influential Companies", citing its work in generative film editing and AI ethics. The company also partnered with Imperial College London under its I-X Business Partners programme to advance AI and synthetic media research.

In September 2026 a Notice of Intention to appoint an administrator was filled at Central Registry of Winding-up Petitions which resulted in the company being placed into administration with insolvency company.

Reports surfaced from staff that they company made their entire workforce of 100+ redundant without payment in September of 2026.

The company ceased trading in September of 2026.

== Patents ==
Mann is named inventor or co-inventor on multiple patent publications related to generative film editing and audiovisual synthesis, including:

- Modification of objects in film
- Generative films
- Generative film editing
- Neural network for audio and video dubbing with 3D facial modelling

== Filmography ==
=== Short films ===
| Year | Title | Director | Writer |
|---|---|---|---|
| 1995 | The Sneeze | Yes | No |
| 2003 | Chaingangs | Yes | No |
| 2006 | Pocket Thief | Yes | Yes |
| 2006 | Tug of War | Yes | No |

=== Feature films ===
| Year | Title | Director | Writer | Producer | Notes |
|---|---|---|---|---|---|
| 2005 | Down Amongst the Dead Men | Yes | Yes | No | Co-directed with Nick Rowntree |
| 2009 | The Tournament | Yes | No | No | |
| 2015 | Heist | Yes | No | No | |
| 2018 | Final Score | Yes | No | No | |
| 2022 | Fall | Yes | Yes | Yes | |
| 2026 | Fall 2: Deadpoint | No | Yes | Yes | |

=== Television ===
| Year | Title | Director | Producer | Notes |
|---|---|---|---|---|
| 1999 | Antique Fair | Yes | No | |
| 2001 | Stars in Their Eyes: Kids | Yes | No | |
| 2004 | Celebrities Exposed | Yes | Yes | |
| 2011 | The Betty Driver Story | Yes | Executive | TV movie |
| 2018 | Six | Yes | No | Episode “Indian Country” |
| 2019 | The Oath | Yes | No | 3 episodes |

== Recognition ==
- Time – Best Inventions (2021) for Flawless TrueSync
- Time – TIME100 Most Influential Companies (2025)
