= Omar Berdouni =

Moroccan actor (born 1979)

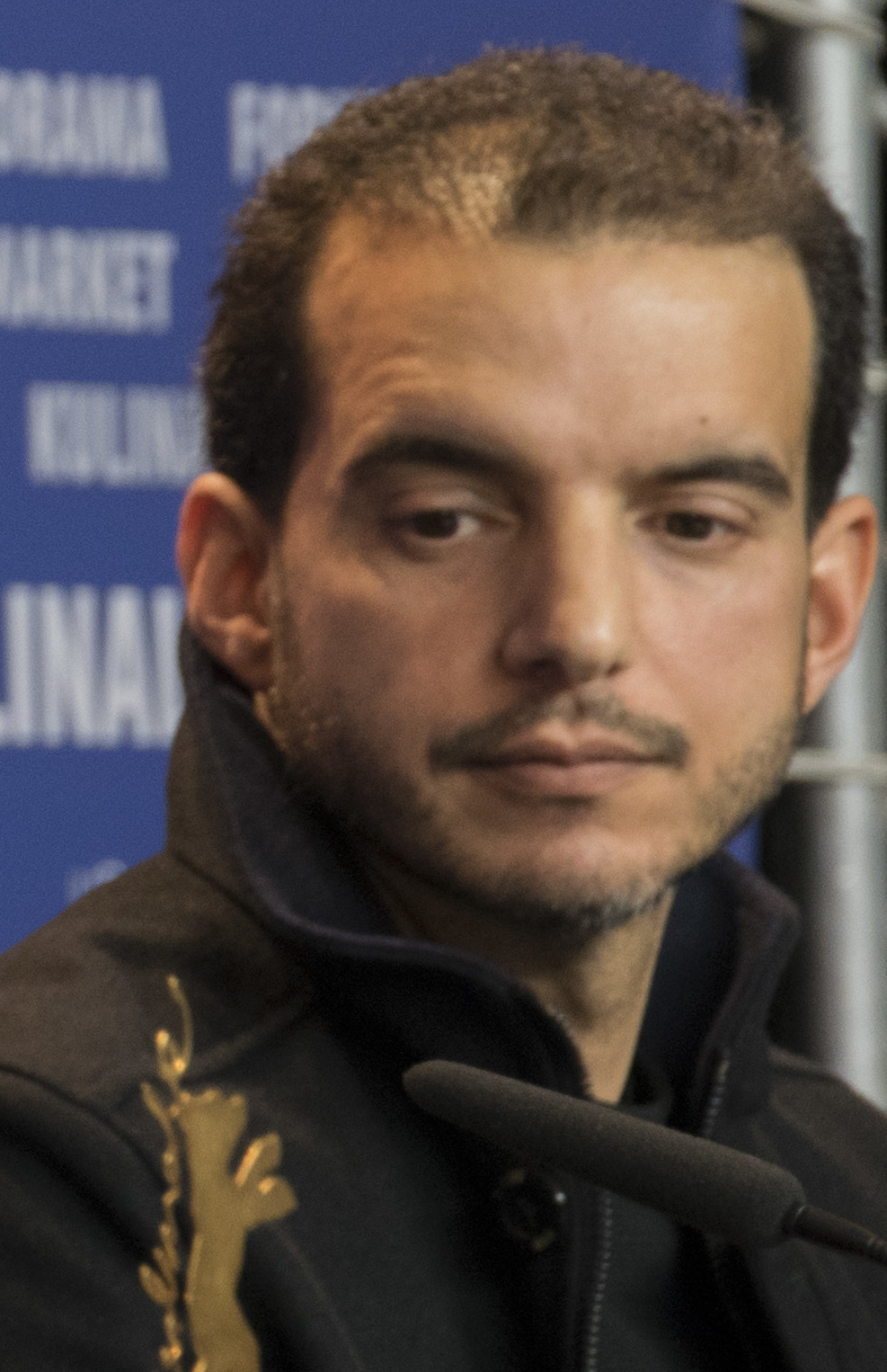
- Born: 20 July 1979 (age 46); Tangier, Morocco
- Citizenship: Morocco
- Occupation: Actor
- Notable work: United 93

Omar Berdouni (born 20 July 1979) is a Moroccan actor.

== Career ==
He has starred in a number of feature films including The Hamburg Cell, United 93, "The Situation", The Kingdom and Extraordinary Rendition, directed by Jim Threapleton. He also appeared in Body of Lies, starring Leonardo DiCaprio. In 2009, he played Ahmed in the BBC show Occupation, (Season 1, Episode 3). He also played in the 2005 French film Les Chevaliers du Ciel and the 2010 film Green Zone.

== Filmography ==
Year	Title	Role	Notes
2000	Kasbah	Driss	
2003	Pompeii: The Last Day	Callistus	TV movie
2003	Ancient Egyptians	Thutmosis	Episode: "The Battle of Megiddo"
2004	The Predator	Predator	Short
2004	The Hamburg Cell	Ramzi bin al-Shibh	TV movie
2005	Sky Fighters	Aziz Al Zawhari	
2005	Andalus	Zine	
2006	United 93	Ahmed al-Haznawi	
2006	The Situation	Bashar	
2007	Sparkle	Luis	
2007	Extraordinary Rendition	Zaafir	
2007	The Kingdom	Prince Ahmed Bin Khaled	
2008	Body of Lies	Al-Saleem's Lieutenant	
2009	Occupation	Ahmed	2 episodes
2010	Green Zone	Righteous Ali	
2013	Captain Phillips	Nemo	
2018	Entebbe	Faiz Jaber	
