= Marines (film) =

- Directed by: Mark Roper
- Written by: Ross Helford
- Produced by: David Dadson; Boaz Davidson; Danny Lerner; Avi Lerner; David Varod
- Starring: Brant Cotton; Frank Sallo; Lawrence Monoson; Andrew Bowen; Thomas R. Martin; George Roberson; Hristo Shopov; Mark Ivanir; Lou Hirsch
- Cinematography: Ross W. Clarkson
- Music by: Stephen Edwards
- Production companies: Nu Image, Martien Holdings A.V.V., Millennium Films
- Release date: 2003
- Running time: 90 minutes
- Country: United States
- Languages: English; Russian

Marines is a 2003 American direct-to-video action film directed by Mark Roper.

== Plot ==
Vladimir Antonov (Hristo Shopov), a ruthless Russian warlord. is one of the most feared criminal masterminds on the planet, and when the smoke cleared on the last attempt by U.S. Marines to take Antonov down, 11 marines were killed and two were captured. Colonel Anslow (George Roberson) has sworn that he will never let a situation like that happen to his men ever again, and over the course of the next 36 hours, he will finally have a chance to show his resolve and capture Antonov once and for all. A group of Marines led by Lieutenant Everett (Brant Cotton) is sent to Russia to capture Antonov, In this case, help comes from an unexpected source, an elite team of Russian troops commanded by Major Dmitri Kirilenko (Mark Ivanir), in whose honesty they are not quite sure.

== Cast ==
- Brant Cotton - Lt. Everett
- Frank Sallo - Cpl. Hamburger
- Lawrence Monoson - Sgt. Larby
- Andrew Bowen - Pvt. Carlos Guillen
- Thomas R. Martin - Pvt. Westlund
- George Roberson - Col. Anslow
- Hristo Shopov - Vladimir Antonov
- Mark Ivanir - Maj. Dmitri Kirilenko
- Lou Hirsch - Mr. Flanders
- Atanas Srebrev - Cpl. Andersen
- George Stanchev - Staff 1
- Yavor Kalinov - Staff 2
- Nikolai Iliev - Staff 3
- Valentin Ganev - Sasha
- Kalin Yavorov - Pvt. Essex
- Yavor Raichev - Pvt. Chase
- Martin Geraskov - Pvt. Cortesi
- Borislav Chuchkov - Pvt. Deck
- Nikolai Ilchev - Pvt. Ossorio
- Dimiter Spasov - Pvt. Funador
- Yoanna Boukovska - Young Woman
- Vladimir Kolev - Russian Soldier
- Georgi Kermenski - Russian Soldier
- Zlatko Zlatkov - Russian Soldier
- Stoio Mirkov - Russian Soldier
- Anton Ugrinov - Russian Soldier
- Valeri Yordanov - Russian Soldier
- Orlin Pavlov - Injured Marine
- Svetoslav Raichev - Injured Marine
- Deylan Dubov - Criminal
- Zachary Baharov - Criminal
- Marii Rosenov - Criminal
- Andrej Slabakov - Tank Driver
- Peter Antonov - Pilot
- P.K. - Marine
- Ivanka Petrova - Mother
