= Avi Lerner =

Israeli-American film producer

- אבי לרנר
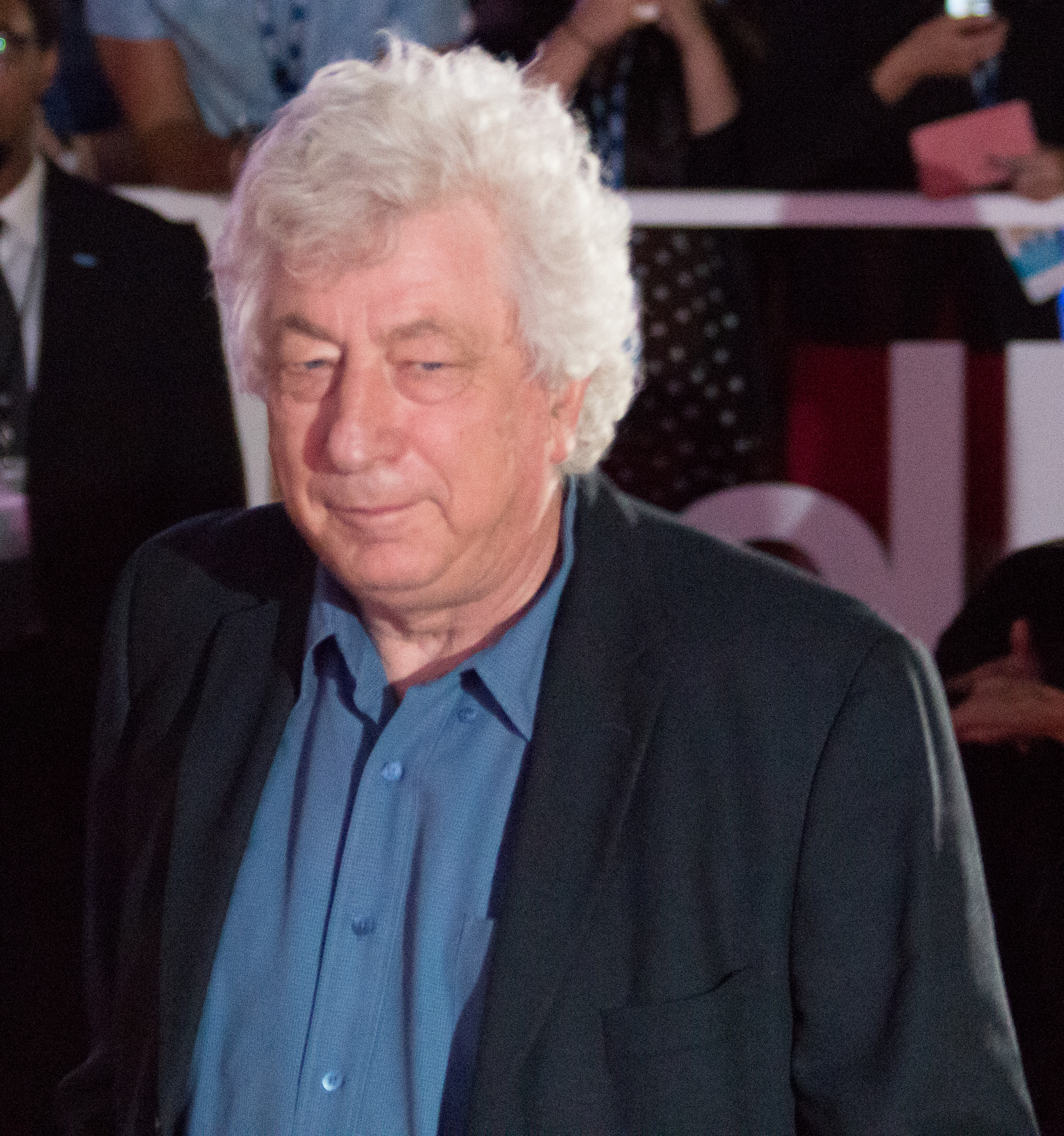
- Lerner at Toronto International Film Festival premiere of Septembers of Shiraz, 2015
- Born: Avinoam Lerner; October 13, 1947 (age 79); Haifa, Mandatory Palestine
- Occupation: Film producer
- Years active: 1984–present
- Notable work: King of California (2007); Rambo (2008); The Expendables (2010)
- Spouse: Daphne Lerner
- Children: 3

Avinoam Lerner (Hebrew: אבי לרנר; born October 13, 1947) is an Israeli-American film producer, primarily of American action movies. Lerner is the founder and CEO of Millennium Films.

== Life and career ==
Avi Lerner was born in Haifa, Mandatory Palestine, on October 13, 1947, to a Jewish family; his mother was from Poland and his father was from Germany. He grew up on Hatzionut Boulevard. He joined the Israeli military in 1966 and served in the Six-Day War and in the Paratroopers Brigade. In an interview with Pnai Plus, Lerner said he took part in the battle for the town of Rafah before penetrating as far as the Suez Canal. He served in the 1973 Yom Kippur War as a reservist.

Lerner originally worked in movie theaters in Tel Aviv but later relocated to South Africa, where he produced several films and also owned a chain of movie theaters until relocating once again to Los Angeles in the early 1990s. In 1991, he served as President of the independent production/distribution company, Global Pictures.

Lerner founded two production companies, Nu Image and Millennium Films, with Trevor Short, Danny Dimbort and Danny Lerner. The companies have a varied output, though the vast majority are action films. Most of the action films Avi produces are filmed in Bulgaria, where he owns Nu Boyana Film.

Nu Image, now Millennium Films, bought the independent film studio First Look Studios in 2007 and restructured the organization to distribute their specialty films. In 2007, Lerner obtained the rights to the Rambo franchise and rebooted the series in 2008 with Rambo.

Until his success with The Expendables (2010), Lerner's reputation was of a B movie producer. Lerner has complained that Israel is the only country where his work is criticized, and he avoids giving interviews to Israeli reporters.

Lerner describes his approach to the film industry as strictly business-oriented: unlike Hollywood's major studios, which invest substantial sums in production but occasionally incur losses, Lerner's team meticulously calculates the potential revenue of each film and adjusts production costs accordingly.

=== Sexual harassment allegations ===
In May 2017, Lerner was sued by a former employee for sexual harassment and gender discrimination. Lerner claimed the accusations were "all lies". In June 2018, Hollywood actor Terry Crews accused Lerner of making a phone call to his manager in which he said Lerner threatened to introduce difficulties into Terry Crews's career unless Crews dropped his case against Hollywood talent agency William Morris Endeavor, employer of agent and founding member Adam Venit.

Lerner stood by Bryan Singer after sexual assault allegations were made against him in January 2019.

I continue to be in development for Red Sonja and Bryan Singer continues to be attached. The over $800 million Bohemian Rhapsody has grossed, making it the highest grossing drama in film history, is testament to his remarkable vision and acumen. I know the difference between agenda driven fake news and reality, and I am very comfortable with this decision. In America people are innocent until proven otherwise.

=== Action stars ===
The bulk of Lerner's films featured action stars who were at their peak in the 1980s–1990s: Jean-Claude Van Damme, Steven Seagal, Wesley Snipes and Dolph Lundgren, usually released as direct-to-video. Lerner produced Rambo starring Sylvester Stallone, and Righteous Kill starring Robert De Niro and Al Pacino for Millennium Films and Emmett/Furla Films. He produced The Expendables, directed by Stallone.

Other features Lerner has had a hand in include: End Game, starring Cuba Gooding Jr. and James Woods; Edison, starring Morgan Freeman, Kevin Spacey, and Justin Timberlake, 16 Blocks, The Black Dahlia, The Wicker Man, and even Werner Herzog's Bad Lieutenant: Port of Call New Orleans, starring Nicolas Cage. He is also listed as a producer in the thriller Trespass.

== Personal life ==
Lerner and his wife, Daphne have three children, Yariv, Keren and Marlena.

== Filmography ==
Executive producer

- The Last Winter (1984)
- Allan Quatermain and the Lost City of Gold (1986)
- American Ninja 2: The Confrontation (1987)
- Going Bananas (1987)
- Alien from L.A. (1988)
- Journey to the Center of the Earth (1988)
- Undisputed (2002)
- Wicked Little Things (2006)
- Day of the Dead (2008)
- Train (2008)
- Brooklyn's Finest (2009)
- Undisputed 3: Redemption (2010)
- Trust (2010)
- Stone (2010)
- The Mechanic (2011)
- The Son of No One (2011)
- Drive Angry (2011)
- Elephant White (2011)
- Trespass (2011)
- Stolen (2012)
- Playing for Keeps (2012)
- Texas Chainsaw 3D (2013)
- Straight A's (2013)
- Lovelace (2013)
- Spiders (2013)
- Olympus Has Fallen (2013)
- The Big Wedding (2013)
- As I Lay Dying (2013)
- Killing Season (2013)
- Ninja: Shadow of a Tear (2013)
- Homefront (2013)
- The Legend of Hercules (2014)
- Stonehearst Asylum (2014)
- The Humbling (2014)
- Good People (2014)
- Before I Go to Sleep (2014)
- London Has Fallen (2016)
- Criminal (2016)
- Boyka: Undisputed (2017)
- The Hitman's Bodyguard (2017)
- Leatherface (2017)
- Expend4bles (2023)
- Red Sonja (2025)

Producer

- Gor (1987)
- Highwaymen (2004)
- The Black Dahlia (2006)
- The Wicker Man (2006)
- Rambo (2008)
- The Expendables (2010)
- Conan the Barbarian (2011)
- The Paperboy (2012)
- The Expendables 2 (2012)
- The Iceman (2012)
- The Expendables 3 (2014)
- 211 (2018)
- Rambo: Last Blood (2019)
- John Rambo (2027)
