= Undisputed (film series) =

Film series article

- Official film series logo
- Starring: Wesley Snipes; Ving Rhames; Michael Jai White; Scott Adkins; Mykel Shannon Jenkins; Various actors (See below)
- Distributed by: Miramax (1); Warner Bros. Entertainment (2-3); Universal Pictures (4)
- Country: United States
- Language: English
- Budget: $31,000,000 (3 films)
- Box office: $15,364,777 (4 films)

Undisputed is an American martial arts sports-drama film series, based on an original concept by David Giler and Walter Hill. The plot follows a number of fighters, who are forced to compete in illegal underground competitions by various crime syndicates for the monetary benefits of the organizations.

Though the original film was met with mixed critical reception, and netted a loss for the studios at the box office, a series of sequels followed in 2007, 2010, and 2016. Despite initial muddled reaction, the franchise has earn its status as sports-cult classics, particularly following the introduction of Scott Adkins as the character named Yuri Boyka; with film critics calling the movies that he featured a "martial arts movie glory", and among the "best..of all-time" of the genre.

The series is intended to continue with a fifth film, and a continuation television series in development.

== Films ==
| Film | U.S. release date | Director(s) | Screenwriter(s) | Story by | Producer(s) |
|---|---|---|---|---|---|
| Undisputed | August 23, 2002 | Walter Hill | David Giler & Walter Hill | David Giler & Walter Hill | David Giler, Walter Hill, Brad Krevoy and Andrew Sugarman |
| Undisputed II: Last Man Standing | January 16, 2007 | Isaac Florentine | James Townsend & David N. White | Boaz Davidson | Boaz Davidson, David Varod and Danny Dimbort |
| Undisputed III: Redemption | April 17, 2010 | Isaac Florentine | David N. White | David N. White | Israel Ringel |
| Boyka: Undisputed | September 22, 2016 | Todor Chapkanov | David White & Tony Mosher | Boaz Davidson | Boaz Davidson, John Thompson, Mark Gill, Les Weldon and Isaac Florentine |

=== Undisputed (2002) ===
George "Ice Man" Chambers, the reigning heavyweight boxing champion, has his world turned upside down when he is accused of rape and sent to prison. Upon commencement of his sentence, Chambers finds himself at odds with the local prison boxing champion of the last decade named Monroe "Undisputed" Hutchins. Following some heated exchanges, its determined that the two will compete in a match to determine who deserves the privilege of being the true undisputed champion.

=== Undisputed II: Last Man Standing (2007) ===
After being released from Sweetwater Prison, George "Iceman" Chambers had returned to his boxing career and reattained his title as Heavyweight Champion of the World. Upon visiting Russia for a series of matches, however, he is framed for possession of cocaine. Promptly transferred to one of their prisons, Chambers discovers that a series of martial arts matches take place in underground matches. The reigning inmate champion Yuri Boyka is a brutal and versatile fighter who, due to the variety of styles he has mastered, calls himself "The Most Complete Fighter In The World". After being told by the prison crew that challenging Boyka may earn him an early release, Chambers determines to earn his freedom; and resolves that he was framed in order to for Boyka to challenge him. Initially maintaining an equal fight, Chambers is impaired by a spiked drink of water and Boyka knocks him out. Confronting the warden, Chambers demands a rematch. Upon the discovery of the fixed match, Boyka is determined to prove that he is the superior fighter. Chambers begins training in mixed martial arts, with a desire to earn his freedom and prove that he was unjustly sentenced.

=== Undisputed III: Redemption (2010) ===
Following the knee injury he received during his match with George "Ice Man" Chambers, Russian inmate Yuri Boyka has been removed from the underground fighting organization and reduced to custodial work within the prison. Disgraced, the fighter finds an opportunity to redeem his reputation when an upcoming international multi-prison tournament featuring the best fighters from each location is scheduled to take place. Learning that the champion will win their freedom, Boyka decides to train for the challenge despite his injuries. Planning to bring down the fighting crime syndicate in the process, the fighter determines that through these events he can once again earn his right to call himself, "The Most Complete Fighter In The World".

=== Boyka: Undisputed (2016) ===
After Yuri Boyka known as "The Most Complete Fighter In The World", earned his freedom from his sentence at a Russian prison, he decides to use his skills and earn an income through various organized fighting matches. When one of his competitors named Viktor unintentionally is killed in the ring however, Boyka questions his life's purpose. Discovering that his widowed-wife named Alma is forced against her will in a life of servitude to a crime syndicate, Yuri finds a purpose in freeing her from her captors by once again entering a series of underground fights. While climbing the ranks within the tournament, Boyka must quickly defeat his opponents while also protecting Alma from the criminal organization that holds her captive.

=== Future ===
In July 2022, Adkins confirmed that a fifth film was in development. While the script has been completed, the actor stated that the project has yet to be green-lit by the studio as producers haven't boarded the production.

== Television ==
In 2018, Adkins announced that a television series was in development via his social media page. In December 2019 however, the actor expressed regret for announcing the project; stating that the project is not officially green-lit, but is still in discussion. Confirming that the series is intended to continue the story from the films and center around his character Yuri Boyka, while also stating that he intends to continue reprising the role in all Undisputed installments.

== Recurring cast and characters ==
List indicators

This section includes characters who will appear or have appeared in the franchise in main roles.

- An empty grey cell indicates the character was not in the film, or that the character's official presence has not yet been confirmed.
- ^{C} indicates a cameo role.
- ^{V} indicates a voice-only role.

| Character | Films | | | |
| Character | Undisputed | Undisputed II: Last Man Standing | Undisputed III: Redemption | Boyka: Undisputed |
|---|---|---|---|---|
| Monroe "Undisputed" Hutchen | Wesley Snipes | | | |
| George "The Iceman" Chambers | Ving Rhames | Michael Jai White | | |
| Yuri Boyka "The Most Complete Fighter In The World" | | Scott Adkins | Scott Adkins | Scott Adkins |
| Jericho "Turbo" Jones | | | Mykel Shannon Jenkins | |
| Boris Tarsov | | | | Trayan Milenov |
| The Ozerov Brothers | | | | Tim Man & Andy Long Nguyen |
| Igor Kazmir | | | | Brahim Achabbakhe |
| Koshmar | | | | Martyn Ford |
| Viktor | | | | Emilien De Falco |
| Zourab | | | | Alon Moni Aboutboul |

== Additional production and crew details ==
| Film | Crew/Detail | | | | | |
| Film | Composer | Cinematographer | Editor(s) | Production companies | Distributing companies | Running time |
|---|---|---|---|---|---|---|
| Undisputed | Stanley Clarke | Lloyd Ahern II | Freeman A. Davies & Phil Norden | Millennium Films | Miramax | 1 hr 33 mins |
| Undisputed II: Last Man Standing | Stephen Edwards | Ross W. Clarkson | Irit Raz | Millennium Films, Nu Image Productions | New Line Home Entertainment | 1 hr 37 mins |
| Undisputed III: Redemption | Minos Matsas | Ross W. Clarkson | Irit Raz | Millennium Films, Nu Image Productions | Warner Bros. Home Entertainment | 1 hr 36 mins |
| Boyka: Undisputed | Stephen Edwards | Ivan Vatsov | Irit Raz | Millennium Films, Nu Image Productions | Universal Pictures Home Entertainment | 1 hr 30 mins |

== Reception ==
=== Box office performance ===
| Film | Box office gross | | | Box office ranking | | Worldwide total home video sales | Worldwide gross total income | Budget | Worldwide net total income/loss | Ref. |
| Film | North America | Other territories | Worldwide | All-time North America | All-time worldwide | Worldwide total home video sales | Worldwide gross total income | Budget | Worldwide net total income/loss | Ref. |
|---|---|---|---|---|---|---|---|---|---|---|
| Undisputed | $12,764,657 | $2,181,493 | $14,946,150 | #4,917 | #6,914 | Information not publicly available | >$14,946,150 | $20,000,000 | ≥-$5,053,850 | |
| Undisputed II: Last Man Standing | —N/a | $1,361 | $1,361 | —N/a | —N/a | $10,731,765 | $10,733,126 | $8,000,000 | $2,733,126 | |
| Undisputed III: Redemption | —N/a | $3,932 | $3,932 | —N/a | #35,544 | Information not publicly available | >$3,932 | $3,000,000 | ≥-$2,996,068 | |
| Boyka: Undisputed | —N/a | $413,334 | $413,334 | —N/a | Information not publicly available | $124,228 | >$537,562 | Information not publicly available | <$537,562 | |
| Totals | $12,764,657 | $2,600,120 | $15,364,777 | x̄ #1,229 | x̄ #10,615 | >$10,855,993 | >$26,220,770 | >$31,000,000 | ≥-$4,779,230 | |

=== Critical and public response ===
| Film | Rotten Tomatoes | Metacritic | CinemaScore |
|---|---|---|---|
| Undisputed | 49% (107 reviews) | 58/100 (29 reviews) | B |
| Undisputed II: Last Man Standing | TBD | —N/a | —N/a |
| Undisputed III: Redemption | TBD (4 reviews) | —N/a | —N/a |
| Boyka: Undisputed | TBD (4 reviews) | —N/a | —N/a |
