= Undisputed II: Last Man Standing =

2006 film by Isaac Florentine

- Official DVD cover
- Directed by: Isaac Florentine
- Screenplay by: James Townsend; David N. White
- Story by: Boaz Davidson
- Produced by: Boaz Davidson; David Varod; Danny Dimbort
- Starring: Michael Jai White; Scott Adkins; Ben Cross; Eli Danker; Mark Ivanir; Ken Lerner
- Cinematography: Ross W. Clarkson
- Edited by: Irit Raz
- Music by: Stephen Edwards
- Production companies: Nu Image; Millennium Films
- Distributed by: New Line Home Entertainment
- Release dates: April 11, 2006 (Netherlands); January 16, 2007 (United States)
- Running time: 94 minutes
- Country: United States
- Language: English
- Budget: US$8 million
- Box office: US$11 million

Undisputed II: Last Man Standing is a 2006 American direct-to-video martial arts action film directed by Isaac Florentine and starring Michael Jai White, Scott Adkins, Eli Danker and Ben Cross. It is the sequel to the boxing movie Undisputed (2002), and the second installment in the Undisputed franchise. White portrays ex-boxer George "Iceman" Chambers, a role originally played by Ving Rhames in the first film. It was followed by two sequels: Undisputed III: Redemption (2010) and Boyka: Undisputed (2017), which continues the story of Russian prison fighter Yuri Boyka, played by Adkins.

== Plot ==
Some years after fighting Monroe "Undisputed" Hutchen in prison, former boxing champion George "Iceman" Chambers visits the Russian Federation for a series of boxing matches and commercial airings, where he is subsequently framed for possession of cocaine and once again sent to prison. There, he witnesses the harsh environment of a Russian prison and discovers a series of illegal mixed martial arts matches dominated by inmate and undefeated champion Yuri Boyka. The prison officials arrange these fights and place large side-bets to make a personal profit, often at the expense of the fighters. Chambers shares a cell with Stevie Parker, a British junkie.

Mob boss Gaga and Warden Markov tell Chambers that if he fights Boyka, he will likely get an expedited appeal and early release. Chambers initially refuses. As a result, he spent time in demeaning physical labor in the prison's sewer system and even quarreled with the guard, in which he experienced firsthand the brutality of the guards and finds himself in the hole. He expected his talent agent, Phil Gold, to get him acquitted, but after learning of Gold's part in the setup, he reluctantly agrees to a match. He is rescued from both forms of humiliation by an inmate named Crot, who uses a wheelchair. Both fighters train hard for the match, though Chambers still relies on his boxing background while Boyka prepares a series of deadly kicks, throws, and grappling combinations designed to humiliate his opponent in the ring. Prior to the fight however, Boyka's gang force Stevie, who is acting as Chambers' cornerman, to spike his water with a light sedative during the fight.

During the fight, Chambers is somewhat taken by surprise at the flurry and variety of Boyka's attacks, but manages to hold his own through the first round by keeping his distance, staying calm, and dealing out painful punching combinations whenever possible, managing to knock Boyka down for the first time. At the end of the first round, Chambers takes a few sips of the spiked water, causing him to lose on the second round when he loses consciousness and falls to Boyka's flying kick. Following the match, Stevie hangs himself out of guilt. After learning he was drugged, he angrily confronts Boyka, accusing him of rigging the fight, which Boyka denies, and after learning he wouldn't be released, he assaults the Warden and is chained to the Pole in the freezing prison yard as punishment. Many of the inmates gave Chambers some clothing to keep him warm in the frigid temperature and they get punished by having to stand outside in the harsh cold. Meanwhile, Boyka confronts his men for drugging Chambers, and furiously kills the two henchmen behind the plot and demands a rematch. Gold then requests more money from Gaga after being pressured about Chamber's release by the United States Government, but is ultimately shot dead by Gaga's enforcer, Svetlana. Chambers agrees to one more match to ensure his release and requests that Gaga provide the inmates with warmer coats for the outside conditions. Chambers receives training in mixed martial arts and grappling from Crot, who was a former soldier. He also reveals to Chambers the reason he was sent to prison; his younger brother had stolen from the Red Army, and Crot took the blame as his brother had a bright future and a family to provide for. Initially only receiving four years and made 2 escape attempts; he was paralyzed in the second attempt that resulted in the death of a guard and was given a life sentence.

Once the rematch began, it is apparent to all the viewers that the combatants are evenly matched and Chambers is more impressive in his style. The fight is long and intense, with flurries of combinations, grapples, and throws traded between the two. Eventually, Chambers realizes that Boyka will not lose consciousness, will not submit, and will likely knock him out if the fight goes on too long. Chambers alters his strategy and manages to get Boyka in a joint lock and ends the fight by breaking Boyka's leg, proving that he is the undisputed new champion of the prison. Shortly thereafter, Chambers is released from prison and uses his winnings to buy Crot's freedom as well. In a final scene, he wheels Crot to a train station to meet with his estranged niece in a happy reunion. Crot thanks Chambers for giving him the remainder of the winnings to start his life again, while Chambers expresses his gratitude for the help and training. Crot then meets with his long lost niece and the two embrace.

== Cast ==
- Michael Jai White as George "The Iceman" Chambers, a former world boxing champion who was framed and sent to a Russian Prison
- Scott Adkins as Yuri Boyka, a psychopathic Russian gang leader highly trained in Martial Arts
- Eli Danker as Nikolai "Crot", an ex-soldier who went to prison to protect his brother and who uses a wheelchair after an escape attempt
- Ben Cross as Stevie Parker, a British junkie who Chambers was bunked with
- Mark Ivanir as Gaga, a Russian Gangster who controls the prison, runs the fights, and set up Chambers
- Ken Lerner as Phil Gold, Chambers talent agent, who shared a role in the set up
- Daisy Lang as Svetlana , Gaga's Enforcer
- Silvio Simac as Arkady Davic
- Ivaylo Geraskov as Alexi
- Valentin Ganev as Warden Markov, the Corrupt Prison Warden
- Atanas Srebrev as Dmitri
- Michail Elanov as Sergei
- Velizar Binev as Kiril

== Music ==
=== Soundtracks ===
1. "The Eyewitness of the World Had To See" Performed by Male Choir of Valaam Conducted by Igor Ushakov Courtesy of 5 Alarm Music.
2. "Mi Smo Za Lovu" (We In The Money) Written by Dekembe Tutu Poku and Nathaniel Dawkins Translated, adapted and performed by Aleksandar Sasha Panich Published by Engine Co 35/Source in Sync Music (ASCAP) courtesy of 5 Alarm Music.
3. "Runnin'" Written by Tom Erba and Nathaniel Dawkins Performed by Nathaniel Dawkins Published by Engine Co 30/Sync Source Music (BMI) Engine Co 35/Source in Sync Music (ASCAP) Courtesy of 5 Alarm Music.
4. "Cocktail Lullaby" Written and Performed by Stephen Edwards Published by Engine Co 35/Source in Sync Music (ASCAP) Courtesy of 5 Alarm Music.
5. "Drug Dealer" Written by Mike Mutantoff Performed by Mike Mutantoff and the Killektive Published by Killective records (ASCAP) Courtesy of NOMA Music.
6. "Krush You" Written by Tom Erba Published by Engine Co 30/Sync Source Music (BMI) Courtesy of 5 Alarm Music.
7. "Till I Die" Written by Tom Erba and Nathaniel Dawkins Performed by Nathaniel Dawkins Published by Engine Co 30/Sync Source Music (BMI) Engine Co 35/Source in Sync Music (ASCAP) Courtesy of 5 Alarm Music.
8. "Adrenaline Junkie" Written by Dalibor Andonov (as Dalibor Andonov Gru) Performed by Gru Published by SOKOJ (BMI) Courtesy of Centroscena.
9. "Bring It On" Written by Tom Erba and Nathaniel Dawkins Performed by Nathaniel Dawkins Published by Engine Co 30/Sync Source Music (BMI) Engine Co 35/Source in Sync Music (ASCAP) Courtesy of 5 Alarm Music.

== Reception ==
Mark Pollard of Kung Fu Cinema gave Undisputed II: Last Man Standing four out of five stars, calling it "the first great martial arts movie of 2007 and Isaac Florentine’s best to date."

== Sequel ==
A sequel titled Undisputed III: Redemption, was released in 2010.

== See also ==
- List of boxing films
