= Mark Ivanir =

Israeli actor

- מארק איווניר
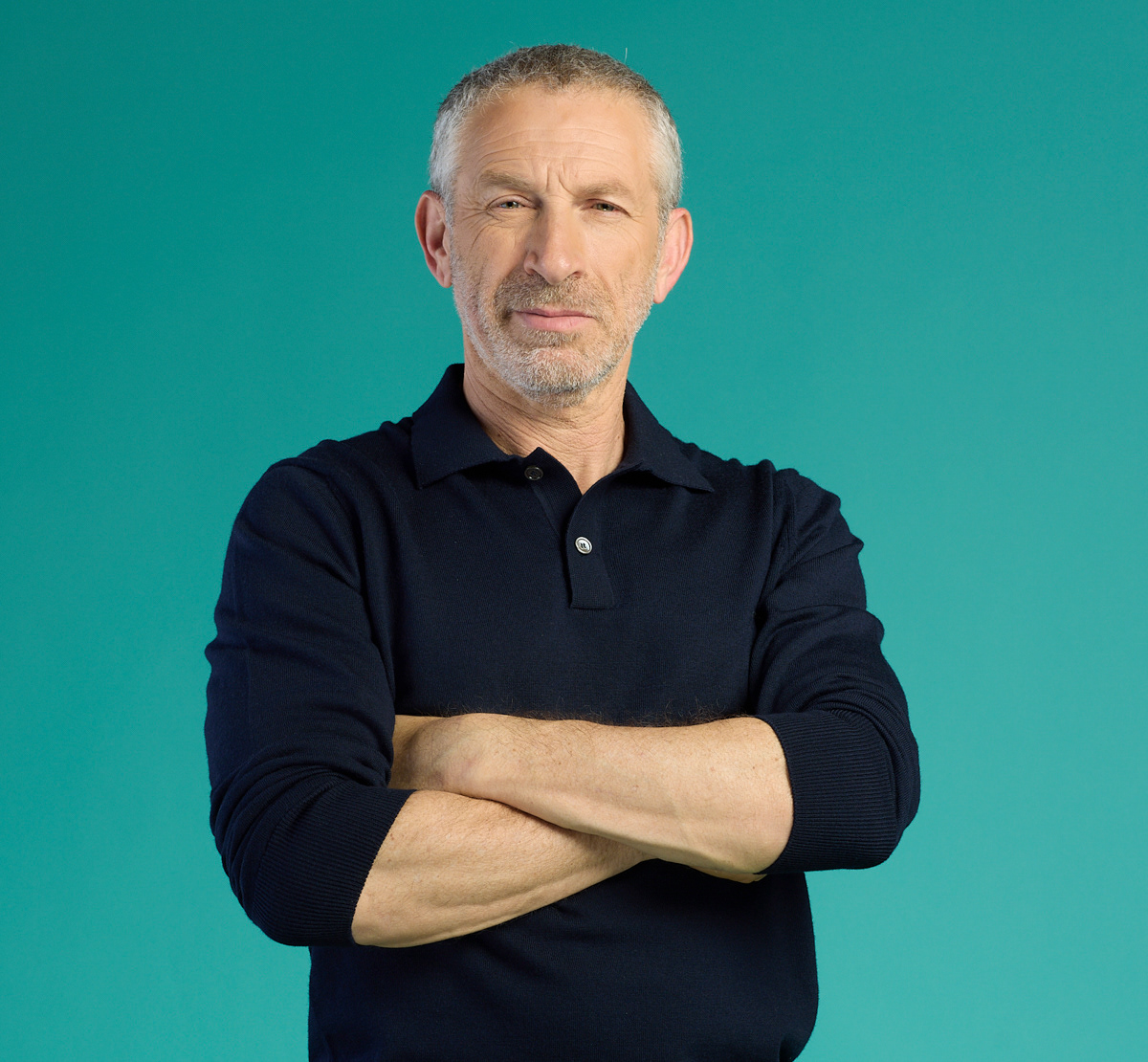
- Ivanir in 2023
- Born: Mark Alexandrovich Ivanir; Chernovtsi, Ukrainian SSR, Soviet Union
- Citizenship: Soviet Union (until 1972); Israel
- Education: École Philippe Gaulier
- Occupation: Actor
- Years active: 1988–present

Mark Alexandrovich Ivanir (Russian: Марк Александрович Иванир; Ukrainian: Марк Олександрович Іванір; Hebrew: מארק איווניר) is an Israeli actor, known for his character roles in film and television. Fluent in six languages, Ivanir's film credits include Schindler's List, Mr. & Mrs. Smith, The Good Shepherd, The Terminal, Johnny English Reborn, A Late Quartet, and Emilia Pérez. On television, he has appeared on The Shield, Homeland, 24, Alias, The Blacklist, and Mayor of Kingstown.

On stage, Ivanir co-founded Israel's acclaimed Gesher Theater.

== Early life ==
Ivanir was born in Chernovtsi, Ukrainian SSR (now Chernivtsi, Ukraine) to a Jewish family. His family emigrated to Israel in 1972, and settled in the Pardes Katz neighbourhood of Bnei Brak. His father, Alexander, was an English language teacher, and his mother Malka a German language teacher. His maternal grandfather, Meshulem Surkis, was a Yiddish writer, journalist, actor, and theatre critic, who was an activist in the Yiddish cultural world. He was raised in a multilingual household, speaking Hebrew, Ukrainian, and Russian, and later learning English.

His national service in the Israel Defense Forces saw him involved in Operation Joshua, one of two operations by the IDF to bring Ethiopian Jews from Sudanese refugee camps to Israel. After completing his service, he turned down a job offer from the Mossad. He briefly studied medicine, before deciding on a life in the performing arts. He completed two years in a circus school, traveled throughout Europe performing on the streets as a clown, and ended up working in the Parisian Cirque Pawelles. After leaving the circus, Ivanir entered into formal theatrical training under Israeli director Nissan Nativ, performing at the Cameri Theater and Israeli Opera.

== Career ==
During this time, Ivanir had his first film role in the 1988 action film Iron Eagle II, directed by Sidney J. Furie. The film was a Canadian-Israeli-American co-production filmed in Israel with an international cast. Ivanir played a Soviet army serviceman, Mikhail Balyonev.

Following his studies with Nativ, Ivanir joined the Gesher Theater, a Tel Aviv-based company composed of emigrants from the former USSR. Using his knowledge of multiple languages, Ivanir translated and adapted eight foreign-language plays into Hebrew for the company. He moved to London to study under Philippe Gaulier at École Philippe Gaulier and Complicité.

Ivanir's first major film role was in Steven Spielberg's 1993 film Schindler's List, where he played Marcel Goldberg. He worked with Spielberg twice thereafter, first for a cameo appearance in The Terminal, then again for The Adventures of Tintin: The Secret of the Unicorn. Ivanir held a pivotal role in Robert De Niro's 2006 film, The Good Shepherd, for which he won the Silver Bear Award at the Berlin Film Festival, later landing a role in Barry Levinson's What Just Happened, this time acting alongside De Niro.

In 2011, he appeared in Universal's Johnny English Reborn, Universal's Big Miracle and 360.

His biggest part to date was in A Late Quartet, released by RKO pictures in the United States, in 2012. The film was voted one of the New York Daily News 10 top films of the year. Ivanir played Daniel Lerner, the first violin of the string quartet, whose other members are played by Philip Seymour Hoffman, Catherine Keener and Christopher Walken.

Ivanir has made more than 60 appearances in guest starring or guest leading roles in shows including 24, Monk, CSI: NY, Law & Order, Fringe, CSI: Miami, Nikita, Royal Pains, Madam Secretary, American Horror Story, and The Morning Show.

He has also had several recurring TV roles. From 2013 to 2021, Ivanir co-starred in the Israeli romantic-comedy series Beauty and the Baker. He recurred as Russian intelligence agent Ivan Krupin over two seasons of Homeland, a Georgian mafia boss on Braquo, a pair of Chechen brothers in Bill Hader's dark HBO comedy Barry, an American 1930's gangster in Babylon Berlin, a snarky Israeli security guard on Amazon's Transparent, Ambassador of the United States to the Holy See in HBO's The New Pope, a cosmonaut on Apple TV's For All Mankind, a microbiologist who opposes Putin in Litvinenko, a Michigan Russian mob lieutenant in Taylor Sheridan's Mayor of Kingstown, and Robert DeNiro's Mossad confidant in Zero Day.

In 2017, he played a Holocaust survivor in the German-language film Bye Bye Germany.

In 2018, he co-starred in the film Entebbe, directed by José Padilha, the creator of Narcos and appeared in The Red Sea Diving Resort.

In 2024, Ivanir had a supporting role in Jacques Audiard's polarizing film sensation Emilia Pérez, for which he won the Outstanding Ensemble Performance award along with his co-stars at the 2024 Mill Valley Film Festival.

== Filmography ==
=== Film ===
Year	Title	Role	Ref.
1988	Iron Eagle II	Mikhail Balyonev	
1989	Berlin-Yerushalaim	Dov Ben Gelman	
1991	Delta Force 3: The Killing Game	Pietre Ivanovich	
1993	Schindler's List	Marcel Goldberg	
2000	The Man Who Cried	Man in Sweatshop	
2001	Hollywood Palms	Russian Mover	
2003	Ish HaHashmal	Avraham Rutenberg	
2003	Marines	Maj. Dmitri Kirilenko	
2004	The Terminal	Goran	
2005	When Do We Eat?	Rafi	
2005	Mr. & Mrs. Smith	Dive Bar Patron	
2005	The Cutter	Doctor Joseph	
2006	Undisputed II: Last Man Standing	Gaga	
2006	The Good Shepherd	Valentin Mironov #2	
2007	The Hunting Party	Boris	
2008	What Just Happened	Johnny	
2008	Get Smart	Russian Guy in Bathroom	
2010	Holy Rollers	Mendel Gold	
2010	Undisputed III: Redemption	Gaga	
2010	The Human Resources Manager	The HR Manager	
2010	Bunraku	Eddie	
2011	360	The Boss	
2011	Johnny English Reborn	Artem Karlenko	
2011	The Adventures of Tintin	Afghar Outpost Soldier / Secretary (voices)	
2012	Big Miracle	Dimitri	
2012	The Fourth State	Aslan	
2012	A Late Quartet	Daniel Lerner	
2016	The Man Who Was Thursday	Jack	
2017	Bye Bye Germany	Holzmann	
2018	7 Days in Entebbe	Motta Gur	
2019	The Red Sea Diving Resort	Barack Isaacs	
2020	Kajillionaire	Stovik Mann	
2022	Rubikon	Dimitri Krylow	
2023	Heart of Stone	King of Spades	
2024	Emilia Pérez	Dr. Wasserman	
2025	Idiotka	Samuel Levlansky	
2026	Masterplan	Bruno	

=== Television ===
Year	Title	Role	Notes	Ref.
1995–1996	Inyan Shel Zman	Doron	7 episodes	
2001	Walker, Texas Ranger	French Mercenary	Episode:"Blood Diamonds"	
2001	JAG	Capt. Yoel	Episode: "The Promised Land"	
2007	Close to Home	Nikolai Shevchenko	Episode: "Internet Bride"	
2008	The Cleaner	Gaza	2 episodes	
2009	Dollhouse	Cyril	Episode: "The Gray Hour"	
2009	CSI: Miami	Gregor Kasparov	Episode: "Seeing Red"	
2010	Im Angesicht des Verbrechens	Andrej, Russian mobster	9 episodes	
2010	Fringe	Roland David Barrett	Episode: "Marionette"	
2012–2015	The Gordin Cell	Yaakov "Yasha" Lundin	Season 1: Main antagonist Season 2: Supporting character	
2012	Transporter: The Series	Sergei Zarov	Episode: "Payback"	
2013	Grimm	Boris Myshkin	Episode: "Red Menace"	
2013–2017	Beauty and the Baker	Tzvika Granot	18 episodes	
2014	Braquo (season 3)	Levani Jordania	7 episodes	
2014	The Blacklist (season 1)	Ivan	Episode: "Ivan" (No. 88)	
2014	The Mentalist (season 7)	Jan Nemic	Episode: "Orange Blossom Ice Cream"	
2014	Crisis	Boris Makarov	Episode: "How Far Would You Come"	
2015–2018	Homeland	Ivan Krupin, Russian intelligence agent of SVR	Recurring role	
2017	Madam Secretary	Timur Soroka	Episode: "Extraordinary Hazard"	
2017	Transparent	Nitzan	4 episodes	
2017	Salvation	Defense Minister Toporov	End of Season 1	
2018	Barry	Vacha / Ruslan	Recurring role	
2018	S.W.A.T.	Cohen	Episode: Never Again	
2018	American Horror Story: Apocalypse	Nicholas II of Russia	Episode: "Fire and Reign"	
2019	The New Pope	Bauer		
2019	For All Mankind	Mikhail Mikhailovich Vasiliev	2 episodes	
2020	Away	Misha Popov		
2020	Nasdrovia	Aleksei		
2022	Babylon Berlin	Abe Gold	Season 4: 12 episodes	
2022	Litvinenko	Alexender Goldfarb		
2023	Pantheon	Yair Gispan	Season 2: 2 episodes	
2024	Mayor of Kingstown	Roman	Season 3: 10 episodes	
2025	Zero Day	Natan	3 episodes	
2026	Big Mistakes	Ivan	Recurring; 4 episodes	

=== Video games ===
Year	Title	Role	Notes	Ref.
2003	SOCOM II U.S. Navy SEALs	Voice	Additional voices	
2004	Syphon Filter: The Omega Strain	Jandran, Sok-ju Yang, CDP Soldier A		
2005	Psychonauts	Mikhail Bulgakov, Lungfish Zealot		
2005	Call of Duty 2	Voice	Additional voices	
2006	Syphon Filter: Dark Mirror	Voice	Additional voices	
2006	Gothic 3	Voice	Additional voices	
2006	Tom Clancy's Splinter Cell: Double Agent	Voice	Additional voices	
2006	SOCOM U.S. Navy SEALs: Combined Assault	Voice	Additional voices	
2006	Call of Duty 3	Actor	Additional voices	
2007	Blazing Angels 2	Voice	Additional voices	
2007	World in Conflict	Voice	Additional voices	
2007	Cars Mater-National Championship	Yuri		
2007	Call of Duty 4: Modern Warfare	Voice	Additional voices	
2008	The Bourne Conspiracy	Voice	Additional voices	
2009	50 Cent: Blood on the Sand	Voice	Additional voices	
2009	The Chronicles of Riddick: Assault on Dark Athena	Mad Margo, Exbob		
2009	World in Conflict: Soviet Assault	Malashenko		
2009	Wanted: Weapons of Fate	The Russian		
2010	Metro 2033	Eugene, Miller		
2011	Ace Combat: Assault Horizon	Russian Pilot		
2011	Battlefield 3	Solomon		
2011	Assassin's Creed: Revelations	Prince Selim	Additional voices	
2012	Diablo III	Voice	Additional voices	
2012	Ghost Recon: Future Soldier	Russian Bodark	Additional voices	
2013	Metro: Last Light	Pavel Morozov		
2014	Wolfenstein: The New Order	Set Roth		
2015	Call of Duty: Black Ops III	Voice	Additional voices	
2016	World of Warcraft: Legion	Voice	Additional voices	
2016	Call of Duty: Infinite Warfare	Voice	Additional voices	
2017	Wolfenstein II: The New Colossus	Set Roth		
2019	Metro Exodus	Krest	Additional voices	
2019	Call of Duty: Modern Warfare	Russian soldiers	Additional voices	
2020	Call of Duty: Black Ops Cold War	Dimitri Belikov	also motion capture	
2021	Call of Duty: Vanguard	Misha Petrov	also motion capture	
