= Conan the Barbarian (2011 film) =

2011 film by Marcus Nispel

- Theatrical release poster
- Directed by: Marcus Nispel
- Written by: Thomas Dean Donnelly Joshua Oppenheimer; Sean Hood
- Based on: Conan by Robert E. Howard
- Produced by: Fredrik Malmberg; Boaz Davidson; Joe Gatta; Danny Lerner; John Baldecchi; Les Weldon; Henry Winterstern
- Starring: Jason Momoa; Rachel Nichols; Stephen Lang; Rose McGowan; Saïd Taghmaoui; Leo Howard; Bob Sapp; Ron Perlman
- Narrated by: Morgan Freeman
- Cinematography: Thomas Kloss
- Edited by: Ken Blackwell
- Music by: Tyler Bates
- Production companies: Millennium Films; Emmett/Furla Films; Conan Properties International LLC; Nu Image; Paradox Entertainment
- Distributed by: Lionsgate Films
- Release dates: August 11, 2011 (Los Angeles premiere); August 19, 2011 (United States)
- Running time: 112 minutes
- Country: United States
- Language: English
- Budget: $90 million
- Box office: $63.5 million

Conan the Barbarian is a 2011 American sword and sorcery film based on the character created by Robert E. Howard, and starring Jason Momoa as Conan. The film was directed by Marcus Nispel and written by Thomas Dean Donnelly, Joshua Oppenheimer, and Sean Hood. Rachel Nichols, Rose McGowan, Stephen Lang, Ron Perlman, and Bob Sapp appear in supporting roles, while Morgan Freeman narrates the film. The story follows Conan, a barbarian warrior who was the sole survivor of his village's slaughter as a child, on his quest for vengeance against the warlord responsible for the massacre.

The film had spent several years in development at Warner Bros. Pictures before the rights were shifted to Nu Image/Millennium Films in 2007, with a clause wishing for immediate start on production. Lionsgate Films and Sony Pictures entered negotiations for distribution, with the film seeing many directors, prominently Brett Ratner, before settling on Nispel in 2009 and subsequently bringing together a cast and crew. Filming began on March 15, 2010, and concluded June 5, 2010.

The film was first released on August 17, 2011, in four countries, Belgium, France, Iceland, and the Philippines, prior to the North American release on August 19. Conan the Barbarian was deemed both a critical and financial failure. However, it was nominated for Best Makeup at the 38th Saturn Awards.

== Plot ==
Born on a battlefield, Conan is the son of Corin, a barbarian chieftain and blacksmith. As a child, he proves himself a skilled but violent warrior to his father. One day, Conan's village is attacked by Khalar Zym, a warlord who seeks to restore the Mask of Acheron and resurrect his wife Maliva, an evil sorceress who will grant him dominion over Hyboria. The mask, crafted by sorcerers and used to subjugate the world, was broken into pieces and scattered among the barbarian tribes who overthrew them. After locating Corin's tribe's piece and slaughtering the entire village, Zym leaves Conan the only survivor.

Years later, a now-adult Conan is a swordsman and pirate, vowing revenge on Zym for his father's death. In the city of Messantia, he meets Ela-Shan, a thief being pursued by Lucius, one of Zym's soldiers whom Conan recognizes from his village's slaughter. He allows himself to be captured alongside Ela-Shan to confront Lucius. Torturing him, Conan learns that Zym needs only the last living female pureblood descendant of the sorcerers of Acheron to unleash the mask's power. Conan frees Lucius' prisoners and leaves them to kill him.

Zym and his daughter Marique attack a monastery in search of their quarry. Fassir, a monk, tells his student Tamara to flee, knowing she is whom Zym seeks. Conan rescues Tamara and captures Zym's righthand man, Remo. After learning Tamara's identity, Conan catapults Remo into Zym's camp, killing him and sending Zym a message.

Zym and Marique confront Conan and Zym finally recognizes him as the boy he left alive. Amidst their battle, Marique poisons Conan with a boomerang sword and he is rescued by Tamara. They jump into the sea and return to Conan's ship, where he recovers. The boat is attacked by Zym's men but Conan and his crew defeat them. Conan departs for Zym's kingdom. His friend Artus sends Tamara after him, and the two spend the night together, having passionate sex. The next day, as she is returning to the boat, Tamara is captured by Zym's men.

Conan asks Ela-Shan for help breaking into Zym's castle. Zym uses Tamara's blood to mend the mask, planning to use her body as a vessel for his wife's soul. After confronting a tentacled monster that guards Zym's dungeons, Conan frees Tamara and battles Zym, eventually reclaiming the sword Marique had stolen from his father and using it to cut off Marique's hand and impale her.

Conan and Tamara become trapped on a bridge as Zym uses the mask's power to call forth his wife. Her spirit begins to possess Tamara's body. Conan destroys the bridge, preventing the ritual from completion and sending Zym to his death. Conan returns Tamara to her birthplace, then travels to his old village. He recalls the memory of his father, content that he has avenged his death and recovered his father's sword, thereby restoring his honor.

== Cast ==
- Jason Momoa as Conan the Barbarian
  - Leo Howard as young Conan
- Rachel Nichols as Tamara, a beautiful and studious novice of a monastery who is actually of a bloodline of Acheronian necromancers.
- Stephen Lang as Khalar Zym, a ruthless empire-building warlord. Zym seeks Acheron's powers over life and death to resurrect his wife Maliva who was burned for her evil. The character was originally going to be called Khalar Singh.
- Rose McGowan as Marique, Zym's daughter and a powerful witch. She is presumed to have inherited her powers from her mother Maliva.
  - Ivana Staneva as young Marique
- Saïd Taghmaoui as Ela-Shan, a thief who pays his debt to Conan by helping him.
- Bob Sapp as Ukafa, a leader of Kushite Tribemen from the savannahs of Kush and one of Zym's lieutenants.
- Ron Perlman as Corin, a blacksmith, a leader of the Cimmerians, and Conan's father.
- Steven O'Donnell as Lucius, the leader of Zym's Legion of Aquilonian mercenaries. Lucius is disfigured by Conan during the ransacking of the Cimmerian village. He became a guard captain in Messantia soon after.
- Diana Lubenova as Cheren, a blind archer who leads a similar band of blind archers in Zym's mercenary army.
- Nonso Anozie as Artus, a Zamoran pirate and friend of Conan.
- Milton Welsh as Remo, a member of an unidentified humanoid race and one of Zym's lieutenants.
- Raad Rawi as Fassir, an elder monk and leader of the monastery charged with the care of Tamara.
- Anton Trendafilov as Xaltotun
- Gisella Marengo as Maliva
- Morgan Freeman as the Narrator
- Laila Rouass as Fialla, Conan's mother
- Alina Pușcău as Lara

== Production ==
=== Development ===
There had been talk in the late 1990s of a second Conan the Barbarian sequel following Conan the Destroyer, about an older Conan, set to be titled King Conan: Crown of Iron; however, due to Arnold Schwarzenegger's election in 2003 as governor of California, this project came to an end.

Warner Bros. spent seven years trying to get the project off the ground, with development attempts made by The Wachowskis, John Milius, and Robert Rodriguez who was closest to completing development but left the project for Grindhouse. Boaz Yakin was hired in 2006 to start again, however, in June 2007 the rights reverted to Paradox Entertainment, though all drafts made under Warner remained with them. Paradox's CEO Fredrik Malmberg told Variety "we have great respect for Warner Bros., but after seven years, we came to the point where we needed to see progress to production." Paradox were auctioning the rights after and various groups took interest in producing, including New Line Cinema, Hollywood Gang, and Millennium Films.

Due to development-time frustrations felt when the rights were with Warner, Malmberg made deal terms where he was asking for $1 million for a one-year option, with another $1 million for each year's renewal. In August 2007, it was announced that Millennium had acquired the right to the project in an unrevealed seven-figure deal, with Malmberg and Millennium's Avi Lerner, Boaz Davidson, Joe Gatta, and George Furla set to produce. The deal was brokered by Gatta, who originally made the deal between Paradox and Warner in 2002. Production was aimed for a Spring 2006 start, with intention of having stories more faithful to the Robert E. Howard creation.

After the partnership on Rambo, Nu Image, Millennium, and Lionsgate partnered on this film due to the strength of that relationship, and the happiness by Millennium producers with the handling of Rambo. Lionsgate were announced to be handling North America's distribution in January 2008. At this point, Thomas Dean Donnelly and Joshua Oppenheimer had been courted to write the script. Nu Image/Millennium founders Lerner and Danny Dimbort were set to fully finance the film at an estimated $100 million. With a brief effort of developing Red Sonja with Rose McGowan as the title character, Robert Rodriguez had mentioned in July 2008 he had been in discussions to produce Conan also. Dirk Blackman and Howard McCain were announced in August to have been hired for a re-write of the script, with the intention of returning to the original source material and in the desire of making an R-rated film.

In November 2008, Brett Ratner was prematurely announced to be the director of Conan to The Hollywood Reporter by Lerner, something which displeased him as he pointed out "I am not doing Conan now. This is totally premature. For now, Conan is only a development deal. I have a deal at Paramount and I'm doing Beverly Hills Cop IV first, no matter what. Avi shouldn't be telling you or anyone else in the press what I'm doing." However, Gatta revealed in May 2009 that after six months of discussions on developing the film, Ratner was off the project due to his busy schedule. Regardless, Gatta was hopeful of still meeting the intention of Millennium to start filming on August 24 in Bulgaria. June 2009 revealed Marcus Nispel would take the reins as director to the film. Sean Hood was announced in February 2010 to be rewriting the script once more for the producers.

Early in pre-production, Conan was a temporary title for the film, until it was changed to Conan 3D. Finally, early in December 2010, the title was definitely changed to Conan the Barbarian, the same title as the 1982 film.

=== Casting ===
In January 2010, Jason Momoa was selected for the role of Conan. Momoa beat Kellan Lutz and Jared Padalecki for the role. He was enrolled in an intense six-week training programme at a stunt and martial arts academy in Los Angeles for his part, while still finalising negotiations for the film. Momoa intended to add 10 pounds of muscle to his 215-pound frame, with the help of The Bourne Ultimatum's stunt performer David Leitch, and the martial arts stunt coordinator for The Matrix Reloaded and The Matrix Revolutions, Chad Stahelski.

Leo Howard was cast as the younger Conan in the film, as the first 15 minutes focused on Conan's youth.

The casting call for Conan's father, Corin, reveals the character to be "powerfully built, intelligent, graceful, master swordsman, skilled blacksmith, de facto leader of Cimmerians and Conan's father. He resolves to answer the terrible request of his dying wife and cuts Conan out of her so she can see him. He then shoulders the burden of raising Conan, which proves to be daunting given the boy's savage nature. Corin teaches his son the meaning of the sword: a hot blade must be cooled and tempered. When Khalar finally corners him and tortures him to death, he shows no regret nor pain, hiding his concern for his son's safety from the eyes of the enemy." Mickey Rourke first entered negotiations. Originally, talks had happened before but after a period of no talk, offers were returned to Rourke in February 2010. Rourke left the project for a second time, in apparent favor of the Immortals film. Ron Perlman took on the character in March 2010.

Bob Sapp portrays Ukafa, "a leader of Kushite Tribemen from the savannahs of Kush. Ukafa is Khalar Zym's second in command, jealous that Zym's daughter, Marique, will one day be warlord. He obeys his leader but plots the overthrow of his daughter. He is a mighty warrior and unbeatable in battle—until he meets Conan."

Rachel Nichols joined the cast as Tamara, described as "the Queen's servant, bodyguard and best friend. She and many other female bodyguards to the queen have been in hiding most of their lives because of the curse of Acheron, which would take the queen’s life to bring almost immortal power to its king. When Khalar Zym, a powerful warlord with ambitions to become the king of Acheron, storms the monastery and captures all of the novitiates, she is separated from Ilira, the one she must protect. With all of her strength and will, Tamara is determined to find and rescue her. She finds herself in league with Conan because of a mutual need to find Khalar Zym. She is not in the least intimidated by Conan’s size or grim demeanor and their alliance eventually blossoms into something that surprises them both."

Stephen Lang plays Khalar Zym, described to be "commanding in size and manner, a warlord and formidable warrior, brilliant, cruel, weathered and tanned by the many campaigns he has waged and won. He is driven in his quest to find the Queen of Acheron and has been building an empire to do so."

Rose McGowan also stars as "an evil half-human/half-witch", as announced by Variety in March 2010. She plays Marique, the daughter of Khalar Zym (Stephen Lang). Although the part was originally written as a male character called Fariq, McGowan impressed the producers with her take of the role, so her character was rewritten to be female. McGowan attempted to inject an Electra complex for the character, noting: “Initially, that obsession with trying to seduce her father was not scripted; it was something that the writer and I talked about quite a bit. But, unsurprisingly, the studio was freaked out by it. A lot of the dialogue that we’d come up with to support that, and really give it a deviant, complicated feel, had to be taken out. So I just figured, 'OK, then, I'll just act it and make it as uncomfortable as possible without any dialogue!'" When asked about preparation to play a witch, McGowan stated that her costume had significance in her preparation and that makeup for her character took 6 hours.

Dolph Lundgren had spoken to the producers in November 2009 about an unspecified role. This never came to fruition.

=== Filming ===
Principal photography was first hoped to start in Spring 2008. Nothing was set until Ratner came on board. Filming had a set date for August 24, 2008, in Bulgaria. Ratner departed in May that year, and the start-date for filming was pushed back, with South Africa being revealed as another filming destination. Filming finally began in Bulgaria on March 15, 2010, wrapping on June 15.

The Bulgarian shooting locations were Nu Boyana Film Studios, Bolata, Pobiti Kamani, Bistritsa, Zlatnite Mostove, Pernik, and Vitosha.

The film had a 3D conversion in post-production.

== Music ==
- Nazlah Al Sallallem - Performed by Cairo Orchestra
- Enta W'Bas - Written and Performed by Hossam Ramzy
- All Music – Composed by Tyler Bates

== Release ==
=== Theatrical ===
Conan the Barbarian was first released on August 17, 2011, in France, Belgium, Iceland, and the Philippines. It was released in Australia, Italy, and Israel on August 18; in the United States, Canada, and Spain on August 19, in Switzerland on August 21, in the United Kingdom on August 26, among others.

=== Home media ===
Conan the Barbarian was released on DVD, Blu-ray and Blu-ray 3D on November 22, 2011, by Lionsgate Home Entertainment.

== Reception ==
=== Box office ===
In its first weekend, Conan made $10,021,215 in 3,015 theaters and opened at #4 in the United States domestic box office. By the end of its run, the film had grossed $21,295,021 domestically and $27,500,000 internationally, for a worldwide total of $48,795,021. The film was a box office bomb, making less than its $90 million budget.

=== Critical response ===
The film has received generally negative reviews. On Rotten Tomatoes the film has an approval rating of 25% based on reviews from 152 critics, with an average score of 4.3/10. The website's consensus states: "While its relentless, gory violence is more faithful to the Robert E. Howard books, Conan the Barbarian forsakes three-dimensional characters, dialogue, and acting in favor of unnecessary 3D effects." At Metacritic the film received a score of 36 out of 100, based on reviews from 29 critics, indicating "generally unfavorable" reviews . Audiences polled by CinemaScore gave the film an average grade of "B−" on an A+ to F scale.

Not all reviews were negative. Betsy Sharkey of the Los Angeles Times wrote that "it is with a certain amount of guilt that I say it's kind of a wicked blast to watch." Scott Weinberg of Twitchfilm.com stated, "Some action scenes are tighter and more cohesive than others, but there's little denying that Nispel's Conan moves like a shot, tosses a lot of hardcore lunacy at the screen, and shows a decent amount of respect for basic matinée action-fests." Although criticizing the stock characters and cliché-ridden script, Variety magazine also gave a mildly positive review, stating "With all earnestness, Nispel embraces the property's classic roots, placing this new Conan squarely within the tradition of sword-and-sorcery pics."

Momoa said making the film was a great experience but that it was "taken over" and that the result was a disappointment. Director Marcus Nispel said that making the film was difficult, describing it as being like "a dog on many leashes" and that it was "the worst experience that I had and I was as unhappy with the result" but that "I am happy though that none of this got in the way of Jason's career path…I always stood by the decision to make Conan with him."

=== Accolades ===
Shaun Smith and Scott Wheeler's work on the film was nominated for the Saturn Award for Best Make-Up, but lost to X-Men: First Class at the 38th Saturn Awards. Lionsgate and Ignition Creative were nominated at the 13th Golden Trailer Awards (2012) in the category "Best Standee for Feature Film".

== Future ==
Various projects to produce a follow-up film, or a different sequel to the original 1982 film, starring variously Momoa, Arnold Schwarzenegger, or even Amber Heard as Red Sonja, have all fallen through. (Note: Attributed to multiple sources:)
