= Red Sonja (2025 film) =

2025 American sword and sorcery film

- Theatrical release poster
- Directed by: M. J. Bassett
- Written by: Tasha Huo
- Based on: Characters by: Robert E. Howard; as adapted by Roy Thomas
- Produced by: Avi Lerner; Joe Gatta; Yariv Lerner; Mark Canton; Courtney Solomon; Joey Soloway; Luke Lieberman
- Starring: Matilda Lutz; Wallis Day; Robert Sheehan; Michael Bisping; Martyn Ford; Eliza Matengu; Rhona Mitra; Veronica Ferres
- Cinematography: Lorenzo Senatore
- Edited by: Andrew MacRitchie
- Music by: Sonya Belousova; Giona Ostinelli
- Production companies: Millennium Media; Cinelou Films; Mark Canton Productions; Fifth Element Productions; Nu Boyana Film Studios; Dynamite Entertainment
- Distributed by: Samuel Goldwyn Films
- Release dates: July 31, 2025 (Russia); August 13, 2025 (United States)
- Running time: 110 minutes
- Country: United States
- Language: English
- Box office: $271,461

Red Sonja is a 2025 American sword and sorcery film directed by M. J. Bassett and written by Tasha Huo, based on the character by Robert E. Howard as adapted by Roy Thomas. The film stars Matilda Lutz as Red Sonja, alongside Wallis Day, Robert Sheehan, Michael Bisping, Martyn Ford, Eliza Matengu, Rhona Mitra, and Veronica Ferres. The film follows the adventures of the nomad barbarian Sonja, who unites a group of unlikely warriors to face off against Draygan and his deadly consort Annisia. Red Sonja premiered in Russia on July 31, 2025, and received a limited theatrical release in the United States on August 13 by Samuel Goldwyn Films. The film received generally mixed reviews from critics.

== Plot ==
Young Red Sonja's homeland, Hyrkania, is invaded by barbarians, who slaughter most of her people and force her to flee into the vast woods nearby. Separated from her tribe, she searches for other Hyrkanians while worshipping the forest goddess Ashera.

Years later, mercenaries enter the forest, hunting animals for their horns, and Sonja tracks them. She learns they collect exotic creatures for gladiator games honoring Emperor Draygan. When Draygan visits to inspect the animals, Sonja attacks the hunters as punishment for cruelty. She is discovered by Draygan's men and knocked out by Karlak, the general. Draygan orders Sonja to be taken to the capital to fight in the games.

Draygan owns half of a Hyrkanian book that grants him ancient scientific knowledge, enabling him to energize the capital with arcane power. He seeks the other half to unlock its secrets and expand his control. He believes Sonja's map of the uncharted forest will guide him to the exiled Hyrkanian refugees who have the missing text.

Sonja joins slaves fighting a cyclops controlled by one of Draygan's devices. She rips off the device and convinces the creature that Draygan is the enemy. The cyclops attacks, injuring Draygan. Sonja then destroys Draygan's energy device before fleeing.

Sonja and the slave fighters escape to the mountains, pursued by Draygan's soldiers and Annisia, a deadly warrior who has schizophrenia. Draygan promises Annisia he will marry her if she brings him Sonja's head. Sonja tries to distance herself from her allies so Draygan will target her alone, but they insist on staying together. They plan to attack the town supplying Draygan with creatures to draw him out. While preparing, the missing Hyrkanians find Sonja and reveal they have the second half of the holy book Draygan seeks.

When Draygan arrives with his forces, a battle begins. Draygan's army defeats the Hyrkanians and he gains the second half of the book. Sonja and Annisia face off in combat, and Sonja is mortally wounded. She is saved from a killing blow by her horse, which knocks Annisia away and brings Sonja to the statue of Asherah in the forest's heart. In near-death delirium, Sonja sees Asherah speak to her in the guise of her dead mother. Asherah heals Sonja and sends her back to battle to bring justice to evildoers.

Sonja reunites with her allies who thought she was dead, and they attack Draygan again. Draygan confronts Annisia, who told him Sonja was dead, and she learns he caused her schizophrenia with fake medicines. They stab each other in a lovers' quarrel, and Draygan escapes into the wilderness.

Sonja tracks Draygan and confronts him as he takes his dying breaths. He says the second half of the book is worthless since it focuses on healing and nature instead of power and energy. Sonja reveals that she knows he was also a child refugee of Hyrkania, and she feels responsible for his dark turn in life because she lost her connection to him after the disaster. Draygan dies holding her hand and the ripped pages of the book are lost in the wilderness.

Sonja leaves the forest to explore the world. In an epilogue set years later, one of her fighter allies finds her in a tavern and tells her that her help is needed. She gathers her weapons and leaves for a new adventure.

== Cast ==
- Matilda Lutz as Red Sonja
- Wallis Day as Annisia
- Robert Sheehan as Emperor Draygan the Magnificent
- Martyn Ford as General Karlak, a man/animal hybrid
- Eliza Matengu as Amarak
- Veronica Ferres as Asherah and the mother of Red Sonja
- Luca Pasqualino as Osin the Untouched
- Katrina Durden as Saevus
- Rhona Mitra as Petra
- Michael Bisping as Hawk
- Trevor Eve as Maester Crudelis
- Philip Winchester as Rathi
- Ben Radcliffe as Daix
- Manal El-Feitury as Ayala
- Danica Davis as Teresia
- Kate Nichols as Berreth
- Tony Way as Dane the Blacksmith

== Production ==
Following the 1985 film starring Brigitte Nielsen, a second Red Sonja film was in development for several years. In 2008, Robert Rodriguez and his production company Troublemaker Studios were working on a version that would have starred Rose McGowan as the titular character. By 2009, however, the Rodriguez project had been scrapped, and in February 2010, rights holders Nu Image announced they were moving forward with another projected new film to be directed by Simon West. Producer Avi Lerner said he intended to shoot the film before the sequel to Conan the Barbarian.

In August 2012, at the premiere of The Expendables 2, West said that the film was still a go and would be out soon. On February 26, 2015, Christopher Cosmos was set to write the screenplay from scratch. According to Deadline, Millennium Films would finance and produce a new Red Sonja movie with Lerner and Joe Gatta producing alongside Cinelou Films' Mark Canton and Courtney Solomon and writing by Ashley Miller.

In October 2018, Bryan Singer was confirmed to direct the film. After multiple men accused Singer of sexual assault in January 2019, Millennium Films announced Red Sonja was no longer on their slate of films due to the allegations. In March 2019, Lerner dropped Singer from the project because he was unable to secure a domestic distributor. In June 2019, Joey Soloway signed on to write, direct and produce the film.

In February 2021, Tasha Huo was hired to write the script with Soloway, and casting was set to begin. By May, Hannah John-Kamen was cast in the titular role. In March 2022, John-Kamen and Soloway left the project, with M. J. Bassett replacing Soloway as director and rewriting Huo's screenplay. That August, Millennium confirmed that the film had begun production in Sofia, Bulgaria, with Matilda Lutz playing the title role. In September 2022, Oliver Trevena was set to appear as Tr'aal.

In October 2022, Rhona Mitra was cast in an undisclosed role, while Trevena exited the film due to scheduling conflicts. In November 2022, Veronica Ferres was cast as Asherah and the mother of Red Sonja. On 12 November 2022, it was reported that filming had been underway for two weeks at studios in the Thermi suburb of Thessaloniki, Greece, with post-production to be completed there as well. By February 2023, Kate Nichols, Katrina Durden, Manal El-Feitury and Danica Davis were cast in undisclosed roles, while Alison McCosh and Clint Wallace were revealed to be the costume designer and production designer, respectively. The film completed post-production by October 2023.

The film was produced by Luke Lieberman for Red Sonja LLC, with Nick Barrucci as executive producer for Dynamite Entertainment.

Lutz said she prepared for the role by reading Red Sonja comics sent to her by producer Luke Lieberman and intentionally avoided watching the 1985 film. From the comics, Lutz said she found the primary essence of the character is that "she's a warrior, but she's also a survivor. I wanted to give her humanity and vulnerability."

Lutz began intense sword training in Bulgaria one month before shooting due to director Basset's preference to shoot fight scenes in long, extended takes.

== Adaptation ==
Red Sonja drew on a variety of details from the comic book source material. From the 1973 Marvel Comics origin story by Roy Thomas and Barry Windsor-Smith, the connection to a supernatural deity is maintained, but Sonja's original trauma consisting in her family being killed and Sonja being raped is removed. Similarly, the traditional Sonja oath (for which she should not allow a man to love her unless he defeats her in fair combat) is also removed. Visual aspects of Sonja's armored appearance and face paint, as well as the character of Dark Annisia, are based on the 2013 "Queen of Plagues" storyline by writer Gail Simone and artist Walter Geovani, published by Dynamite Comics. Emperor Draygan the Magnificent first appeared in Dynamite's 2019 "The Queen's Gambit" story by writer Mark Russell and artist Bob Q.

Prior to the film's release, Lutz said the film would differ in tone from the "male gaze" of the comics, and present "a completely different story". However, the character's trademark bikini would remain the main costume for the film. On September 10, 2024, a set photo featuring a partially armored Sonja was posted to the Red Sonja Instagram account, followed by a clip showing the bikini. In the film, Red Sonja's chainmail bikini "is used as an element of power that the emperor has over her ... But then she owns it," said Lutz.

== Release ==
By February 17, 2025, Signature Entertainment picked up Red Sonja's UK and Irish distribution rights and set a theatrical release of late 2025. On March 26, 2025, Samuel Goldwyn Films picked up the U.S. distribution rights to the film. The film was released theatrically in the United States for one day only on August 13, 2025, which was followed by release on video on demand on August 29, by Samuel Goldwyn Films.

=== Home media ===
On September 8, 2025, Signature Entertainment released the film on DVD and Blu-ray in the UK. On November 11, Samuel Goldwyn Films released the Blu-ray and DVD editions in the U.S.

=== Marketing ===
A teaser trailer debuted at the 2023 San Diego Comic-Con to commemorate the 50th anniversary of the character. The trailer and poster were released in early July 2025.

== Reception ==
=== Critical response ===
On the review aggregator website Rotten Tomatoes, 56% of 66 critics' reviews are positive, with an average rating of 5.5/10. The website's consensus reads: "High fantasy noticeably constrained by a relatively low budget, Red Sonja doesn't overcome its limitations but does have enough moxie to be a respectable B-movie effort." Metacritic, which uses a weighted average, assigned the film a score of 41 out of 100, based on 6 critics, indicating "mixed or average" reviews.

The Guardian gave the film two stars out of five, criticizing its "clunky script" and summarizing it as a "soggy, CGI-infused, low-budget confection". The Wrap said the movie "improves on the 1985 film, but its low budget holds it back". AIPT praised Lutz's performance in the lead role, citing her "confidence... vulnerability and humor". Collider gave the film a mixed review, saying Lutz "evolves well into the role as the film proceeds, building a solid and empowered character" but criticized the production design and combat choreography. The Hollywood Reporter posted a negative review, saying the film is "hampered by ... low-budget production values" and the story was "a deadly blend of cheesy and dull". Esquire listed Red Sonja as one of the best action movies of 2025 but gave the film a mixed review, saying it "should have been a TV pilot", but Lutz "looks great taking big swings".
