= The Paper Tigers =

2020 American martial arts film by Bao Tran

- Directed by: Bao Tran (Tran Quoc Bao)
- Written by: Bao Tran (Tran Quoc Bao)
- Produced by: Al'n Duong; Dan Gildark; Yuji Okumoto; Tran Quoc Bao; Michael Velasquez
- Starring: Alain Uy; Ron Yuan; Mykel Shannon Jenkins
- Cinematography: Shaun Mayor
- Edited by: Kris Kristensen
- Music by: Daniel L.K. Caldwell
- Production companies: Beimo Films; Persistence of Vision Films
- Distributed by: Well Go USA Entertainment
- Release dates: August 2020 (Fantasia); May 7, 2021 (United States)
- Running time: 108 minutes
- Country: United States
- Language: English
- Box office: $118,351

The Paper Tigers is a 2020 American martial arts action comedy film written and directed by Bao Tran in his feature film directorial debut. It stars Alain Uy, Ron Yuan and Mykel Shannon Jenkins as three middle-aged former kung fu prodigies who set out to avenge the murder of their master. Yuji Okumoto, an actor on the film The Karate Kid Part II and the series Cobra Kai, served as a producer for the film.

== Cast ==
- Alain Uy as Danny, also known as Danny Eight Hands and leader of The Three Tigers.
- Ron Yuan as Hing, Danny's best friend and one of The Three Tigers
- Mykel Shannon Jenkins as Jim, a Brazilian Jiu Jitsu trainer and one of The Three Tigers
- Jae Suh Park as Caryn, Danny's ex-wife who wants to keep the family alive due to their divorce and custody battles
- Matthew Page as Carter, the Tigers' longtime jealous rival
- Joziah Lagonoy as Ed, Danny and Caryn's son
- Ken Quitugua as Zhen Fan, a disgraced student of Sifu Cheung
- Yoshi Sudarso as Teen Danny
- Peter Sudarso as Teen Hing
- Gui DaSilva-Greene as Teen Jim
- Mark Poletti as Teen Carter
- Phillip Dang as Punk Chief
- Andy Le as Punk Fu
- Brian Le as Punk Boi
- Raymond Ma as Sifu Wong
- Roger Yuan as Sifu Cheung

== Production ==
=== Development ===
The film was created due to director and producers' strong admiration of martial arts and old school, fun martial art films. The director Bao Tran began writing the film treatment for this concept in 2011. The inspiration for the movie came from his classmates and friendships when he studied martial arts.

=== Pre-production ===
Tran had a male Asian-American main character in mind with a minority leading cast. The Paper Tigers team knew that it would be challenging to find studio support for the film as they wanted to cast people of color (POC) and diverse actors in the project as opposed to fall to the trend of whitewashing in film. When the film project was pitched to Hollywood producers, they were offered $4 million with a caveat that there would be no Asian lead character and suggested a white lead character to be played by Bruce Willis instead. They were also asked to write a role for Nicolas Cage. The team declined the offer and request. Tran mentioned that Hollywood usually sent their mid-level executives who were also POC to be the messengers of whitewashing.

The team also had resistance from some other Asian Americans when seeking funding outside of major studios. Those who opposed wanted to advocate for different stories for Asian Americans instead of a martial arts film, which is often considered a stereotype. While Tran is aware of the history of Asian caricatures in the U.S., this story was based on his and the producers' personal experiences growing up as well as their love for martial arts. Tran emphasized having more representation and nuances, implying that there can be different perspectives of Asian-American storytelling. In addition, there can be developed Asian-American characters in a martial arts film, which is not typically seen in American media. He also mentioned that, "at the end of the day, we wanted to tell a fun, entertaining story that depicted our experience honestly." Tran included both experiences in his director's statement as part of the movie's press kit, which can be found on the slider on Well Go USA's website.

The team wanted to keep their vision without changing the cast or story. Tran said, "It is important because I think it’s ultimately being able to have your voice, and as a storyteller, be able to express your story and your history to the world." A short concept video was created and crowdfunded over $124,000 on Kickstarter in 2018. The concept video featured the teen versions of the main cast that would be later put into the film two years later. They were also able to draw interest from local investors, including a donor who studied under Bruce Lee, and were able to secure about $1 million for their shooting budget. This allowed the team more freedom in casting the main characters and other roles for their independent film.

=== Filming ===
Filming took place in Seattle, Washington, which is a tribute to Bruce Lee's legacy and residency there. Many of the scenes were in Chinatown–International District. Several local businesses were very supportive and that was a community endeavor. Tran said, "Jade Garden provided the crew with food. The Dynasty Room let us shoot there, and the Nisei Vets Hall let us use their space." China Harbor's dining area was also featured in the movie. In addition, the City of Shoreline's film office provided locations for the crew to film like Richmond Beach and Fircrest Residential Habilitation Center.

The director allowed actors to improvise in some of the scenes.

The main cast Alain Uy, Ron Yuan and Mykel Shannon Jenkins became friends while filming. Ron Yuan had to gain 68 pounds (31 kg) for his role as Hing.

On September 7, 2019, the crew planned to shoot the final fight on a rooftop at night, but a large thunderstorm delayed five hours of filming. About 2,200 lightning strikes were recorded that night, which averaged about eight strikes per second. They were able film the scene after the storm cleared, finishing their final day of shooting.

It took about 34–35 days to shoot all footage.

== Release ==
The film premiered at the Fantasia International Film Festival in August 2020.

In September 2020, Well Go USA Entertainment acquired North American distribution rights to the film. Release date was on May 7, 2021 in select theaters and video on demand.

== Home media ==
The Paper Tigers was released on DVD and Blu-ray on June 22, 2021, from Well Go USA. The releases contain behind-the-scenes material, deleted scenes and bloopers and trailers. Currently, it is available to stream on Tubi and video on demand.

Previously, Netflix US released the movie in August 2021.

== Reception ==
=== Critical response ===
On the review aggregator website Rotten Tomatoes, 98% of 62 critics' reviews are positive, with an average rating of 7.1/10. The website's consensus reads: "The Paper Tigers blends action, comedy, and heart to produce a fresh martial arts movie with plenty of throwback charm." Metacritic, which uses a weighted average, assigned the film a score of 67 out of 100, based on 14 critics, indicating "generally favorable" reviews.

Alan Ng of Film Threat gave the film a score of eight out of ten. Haleigh Foutch of Collider awarded it a grade of "B+". In a review of the film for Tae Kwon Do Life Magazine, Marc Zirogiannis called it "a testament to the creative vision of its creator and the clear 'Buy In' of the cast and crew. This is one of the best films I have seen in years." Jessica Kiang of Variety stated in a review that "Tran's irresistibly good-humored debut is a diverting blend of Hong Kong and Hollywood that delivers, on a slender, Kickstarter-enhanced budget, a rousing roundhouse hug to both traditions."

In December 2021, Tae Kwon Do Life Magazine named The Paper Tigers the best martial arts film of 2021.
