= Lloyd Ahern =

American cinematographer (1905–1983)

- Born: Lloyd George Ahern; April 7, 1905; Biloxi, Mississippi, U.S.
- Died: December 29, 1983 (aged 78); California, U.S.
- Occupation: Cinematographer
- Spouse: Lucy Ahern
- Children: 4; including Lloyd Ahern II

Lloyd George Ahern (April 7, 1905 – December 29, 1983) was an American cinematographer. He won a Primetime Emmy Award and was nominated for two more in the category Outstanding Cinematography for his work on the television programs The 20th Century Fox Hour, Columbo and The Love Boat.

Ahern died in December 1983 of complications from strokes at the UCLA Medical Center in California, at the age of 78.
