= The Son of No One =

2011 film

- Theatrical release poster
- Directed by: Dito Montiel
- Written by: Dito Montiel
- Produced by: Avi Lerner; Holly Wiersma; John Thompson
- Starring: Channing Tatum; Tracy Morgan; Katie Holmes; Ray Liotta; Juliette Binoche; Al Pacino
- Cinematography: Benoit Delhomme
- Edited by: Jake Pushinski
- Music by: Jonathan Elias; David Wittman
- Production companies: Nu Image; Millennium Films
- Distributed by: Hannibal Pictures; Millennium Films; Nu Image Films; Anchor Bay Films
- Release date: January 28, 2011 (Sundance)
- Running time: 95 minutes
- Country: United States
- Language: English
- Budget: $15 million
- Box office: $1.1 million

The Son of No One is a 2011 American crime thriller film written and directed by Dito Montiel based on Montiel's book. The film is Dito Montiel's third collaboration with actor Channing Tatum.

== Plot ==
In 2002, Jonathan White is a rookie police officer under Captain Marion Mathers in the Queens, New York, neighborhood where he grew up. To provide for his wife Kerry and ailing young daughter, he works hard to keep his life on track, but his life is threatened when a dark secret surfaces. An anonymous source reveals new information about two unsolved murders from 1986 in the same neighborhood. In 1986, 14-year-old Jonathan killed two men in self-defense. His friends Vinnie and Vicky helped him dispose of the bodies and keep their involvement a secret from the authorities. The detective on the case, Stanford, knew that Jonathan was involved, but he disposed of the evidence out of loyalty to Jonathan's late father, who had been his partner. The boyfriend of Vinnie's mother forced Vinnie to have sex with him. Vinnie and Jonathan decided to rob the man and escape, but their plan failed.

In 2002, Jonathan meets with Vinnie for the first time in years, and realizes he has descended into mental illness. Jonathan has been getting anonymous phone calls and letters threatening to expose what he did 16 years ago, so he contacts Loren Bridges, the reporter who has been trying to create a newspaper story from the source material that has been leaked. He tries to convince her not to publish the story, but she refuses and leaves. When she leaves the restaurant, she is followed and murdered by an unknown assailant. When Kerry demands to know what is happening, Jonathan admits to her that he was responsible for the killings.

The next morning, Jonathan learns of Loren's death before he receives a call from Captain Mathers, who informs him that Jonathan's partner is outside waiting for him. He is taken to privately meet with Mathers and Stanford, the latter who is now the city's police commissioner and intends to hand the job to Mathers after he retires. Mathers shows photos of Jonathan and Loren in a restaurant before her death. Mathers and Stanford tell him that they had Loren killed to prevent her from publishing the story and making the department look bad; they threaten to frame him for her murder unless he cooperates.

Jonathan heads home, but soon turns around and drives to Vinnie's apartment, knowing that Mathers and Stanford are going to kill him. He arrives to find the men on the roof about to murder Vinnie. Jonathan tries to intervene, but his partner holds him back and Mathers shoots and wounds him. Mathers hands a gun to Vinnie and orders him to kill Jonathan, but Vinnie decides to shoot Mathers instead. Stanford shoots Vinnie, who falls off of the roof. Stanford tells Jonathan to leave and forget about everything that has happened. Jonathan reluctantly leaves and finds a dying Vinnie, who tells him that he never told anyone what had happened.

Mathers's death and the two 1986 murders are blamed on Vinnie, who is portrayed as a mentally unstable murderer in the media. Jonathan tries to carry on a normal life. Vicky sends a letter to Jonathan explaining that this will be her last letter, identifying herself as the person who sent the letters to the newspaper.

== Cast ==
- Channing Tatum as Jonathan White
- Tracy Morgan as Vincent Carter ("Vinnie")
- Katie Holmes as Kerry White
- Ray Liotta as Captain Marion Mathers
- Juliette Binoche as Loren Bridges
- Al Pacino as Detective Charles Stanford
- James Ransone as Thomas Prudenti

== Production ==
The filming took place from February to April 2010 in Astoria, Queens, New York. Several scenes were shot in the Queensbridge Houses in Long Island City, Queens.

== Release ==
The film was selected to close the 2011 Sundance Film Festival on January 30, 2011. After a poor reception, the film's ending was recut. Anchor Bay secured distribution rights to the film and released it in ten theaters. It grossed $30,680 in the United States, and a total of $1.1 million worldwide. It was released on DVD in the U.S. on February 19, 2012.

== Reception ==
The Son of No One provoked strong reactions at Sundance. Although a private screening for distributors resulted in walkouts, the public showing was more positive.

Rotten Tomatoes, a review aggregator, reports that 16% of 37 surveyed critics gave the film a positive review; the average rating is 3.8/10. The consensus states: "Needless stylistic flourishes and wholly illogical storytelling make The Son of No One a grisly, repugnant journey." Metacritic rated it 36/100, based on 18 reviews.

Rob Nelson of Variety wrote, "Montiel's awkward appropriation of gritty crime-drama conventions results in a film that's contrived and implausible, at times absurdly so."

John DeFore of The Hollywood Reporter wrote that it "bounces nicely between two New York eras but is built around an unconvincing premise".

Writing for the Chicago Sun-Times, Roger Ebert rated it two stars out of four, and said that the film "seems to be adding up, but its drama and urgency are without purpose".

The New York Times's Stephen Holden wrote that the film features intense performances but a nonsensical plot.

== Awards ==
Award	Category	Recipient(s)	Result	Ref.
Young Artist Award	Best Performance in a Feature Film – Leading Young Actor	Brian Gilbert	Nominated	
