= Nu Boyana Film Studios =

Bulgarian film and television production company

Coordinates: 42.64022°N 23.29162°E

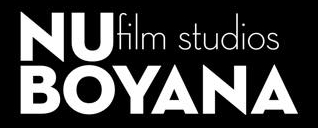
- Industry: Cinematography
- Founded: 1962
- Headquarters: Sofia, Bulgaria
- Area served: Worldwide
- Key people: Yariv Lerner, CEO
- Website: nuboyana.com

Nu Boyana Film Studios (Bulgarian: Ню Бояна Филм, romanized: Nyu Boyana Film) are film studios situated in Sofia, Bulgaria.

The film production complex was opened in 1962 and was state owned until 2005 when it was bought by one of the longest-running independent film companies in Hollywood, Nu Image and Millennium Films. With an approximate area of 30 hectares (75 acres), the complex features 10 sound stages and various standing sets – New York, London, Middle Eastern street, St Paul's Cathedral and a big ancient set, complete with a Roman colosseum.

Boyana Film was the main location for film production during the communist regime when Bulgarian cinema was at its peak.

Since 2020 the company established Nu Boyana Film Studios Hellenic SA, with production studios in Thermi, Greece.

== Productions ==
=== Film ===
Most internationally popular films serviced at the studio:

- The Black Dahlia (2006)
- The Contract (2006)
- Hitman (2007)
- Day of the Dead (2008)
- War, Inc. (2008)
- Universal Soldier: Regeneration (2009)
- Ninja (2009)
- Thick as Thieves (2009)
- The Grudge 3 (2009)
- The Fourth Kind (2009)
- The Expendables (2010)
- The Way Back (2010)
- Conan the Barbarian (2011)
- The Expendables 2 (2012)
- Kon-Tiki (2012)
- Getaway (2013)
- Olympus Has Fallen (2013)
- Spiders 3D (2013)
- The Legend of Hercules (2014)
- Apocalypse Pompeii (2014)
- 300: Rise of an Empire (2014)
- The Expendables 3 (2014)
- Autómata (2014)
- Stonehearst Asylum (2014)
- Survivor (2015)
- Septembers of Shiraz (2015)
- Kung Fury (2015)
- Criminal (2016)
- Boyka: Undisputed (2016)
- London Has Fallen (2016)
- Mechanic: Resurrection (2016)
- Chuck (2016)
- Day of the Dead: Bloodline (2017)
- Vivegam (2017)
- Loving Pablo (2017)
- Leatherface (2017)
- The Hitman's Bodyguard (2017)
- Bullet Head (2017)
- Security (2017)
- Acts of Vengeance (2017)
- Hunter Killer (2018)
- The Hurricane Heist (2018)
- The Wild Pear Tree (2018)
- The Angel (2018)
- 211 (2018)
- Hellboy (2019)
- Angel Has Fallen (2019)
- Rambo: Last Blood (2019)
- After We Fell (2021)
- Jolt (2021)
- Till Death (2021)
- Prey for the Devil (2021)
- Hitman's Wife's Bodyguard (2021)
- The Protégé (2021)
- After Ever Happy (2022)
- The Princess (2022)
- Memory (2022)
- The Enforcer (2022)
- The Offering (2023)
- Beautiful Disaster (2023)
- Cobweb (2023)
- Expend4bles (2023)
- The Bricklayer (2023)
- Wanted Man (2024)
- Air Force One Down (2024)
- Hellboy: The Crooked Man (2024)
- Dirty Angels (2024)
- Red Sonja (2025)
- Lucky Strike (2026)
- Kung Fury 2 (TBA)

=== Television ===
- Spartacus (2004)
- Ancient Rome: The Rise and Fall of an Empire (2006)
- Plebs (2013–present)
- The Aliens (2016)
- Barbarians Rising (2016)
- Section Zero (2016)
- Doctor Who (2016, 2020)
- Stolen Life (2016)
- Absentia (2017)
- Bromans (2017)
- The Outpost (2018)
- Into the Night (2020)

== Ukrainian refugees ==
Nu Boyana Studios started a program to help refugees fleeing the Russian invasion of Ukraine. They sent vehicles to pick up refugees crossing the Ukraine border to Moldova, and transported them to Bulgaria. Nu Boyana CEO Yariv Lerner said he put a call out that said, "To all those in need in the film industry, and if you're looking for work, we welcome you here."
