= Boyka: Undisputed =

2016 film by Todor Chapkanov

- Directed by: Todor Chapkanov
- Screenplay by: David White; Tony Mosher
- Story by: Boaz Davidson
- Produced by: Boaz Davidson; John Thompson; Mark Gill; Les Weldon; Isaac Florentine
- Starring: Scott Adkins; Teodora Duhovnikova; Alon Moni Aboutboul; Julian Vergov
- Cinematography: Ivan Vatsov
- Edited by: Irit Raz
- Music by: Steve Edwards
- Production companies: Millennium Films; Nu Image
- Distributed by: Universal Pictures Home Entertainment
- Release dates: September 22, 2016 (Fantastic Fest); August 1, 2017 (United States)
- Running time: 90 minutes
- Countries: United States; Bulgaria
- Language: English
- Box office: $413,334

Boyka: Undisputed (also known as Boyka: Undisputed 4), is a 2016 martial arts action film directed by Todor Chapkanov, and written by David White and Tony Mosher from a story by Boaz Davidson. It is the sequel to Undisputed III: Redemption (2010), and the fourth installment overall in the Undisputed franchise. Scott Adkins reprises his role as Yuri Boyka, who meets the widow of a man he accidentally killed in the ring and becomes her champion after learning that she is in trouble.

== Plot ==
Several months after the events of the previous film, Yuri Boyka is now a free man and has a manager named Kiril. Boyka still fights in underground matches in Kyiv, Ukraine. In a match, Boyka accidentally kills his opponent Viktor and begins to regret and thinks about what he is fighting for. After discovering Viktor has a wife named Alma, in spite of having himself a promising fight booked, Boyka tells Kiril to make a fake passport and goes to Russia to meet Alma. In the Russian town of Drovny, Boyka finds out that Alma owes money to a crime boss named Zourab. Alma lives in a community center and serves as a waitress in Zourab's underground fighting club.

Zourab is now searching for a good martial artist to fight in his club. Boyka wants to help Alma pay her debt so he makes a deal with Zourab that he will fight for him in exchange for Alma's freedom. Zourab agrees and suggests Boyka to fight in three matches. Alma invites Boyka to the training room in the community center for his training. Boyka easily defeats his opponent in the first match and then must fight two brothers in the second match, where he defeats them by double knockout. In the community center, Boyka asks Alma why she does not leave the town. Alma tells that she cannot leave the children and the center as the children could become gangsters or criminals.

In the third match, Boyka defeats Igor Kazmir, who is the elite henchman of Zourab. Boyka is about to leave, but Zourab forces him to fight one more match to defeat his true champion. Boyka reluctantly agrees. Zourab bribes a high-ranking police officer to bring to his club Koshmar, a giant, aggressive and relentless martial artist. Zourab thinks Boyka cannot defeat Koshmar as he has a large and strong body. After some intense moments, Boyka breaks one arm and one leg of Koshmar and finally kicks him out of the ring, knocking him unconscious.

Enraged, Zourab takes Alma as a hostage and orders his henchmen to kill Boyka, but Boyka kills all of Zourab's henchmen and chases after him. Boyka gets shot, but he grabs Zourab and chokes him to death. An injured Boyka asks Alma if she can forgive him for what he did to Viktor and is arrested by the police, therefore missing his slated fight. Six months later, Alma visits Boyka in prison and tells that she finally forgives him. Boyka continues fighting in the prison to pursue the title of most complete martial artist in the world.

== Cast ==
- Scott Adkins as Yuri Boyka
- Teodora Duhovnikova as Alma
- Alon Moni Aboutboul as Zourab
- Julian Vergov as Slava
- Brahim Achabbakhe as Igor Kazmir
- Paul Chahidi as Kiril
- Petio Petkov as Dominik
- Valentin Ganev as Warden Markov
- Vladimir Mihaylov as the Priest
- Vladimir Kolev as Koychev
- Emilien De Falco as Viktor
- Tim Man as Ozerov Brother #1
- Andreas Nguyen as Ozerov Brother #2
- Martyn Ford as Koshmar

== Production ==
The film was previously known under the working title Undisputed IV. Isaac Florentine (who had helmed the second and third installments) was slated to direct this one as well, but ultimately opted to pass on the directing gig in order to tend to his ill wife, although he remained involved as a producer. The job went to Todor Chapkanov, who had performed second unit duties on Nu Image's major production London Has Fallen just prior. After J.J. Perry in Undisputed 2 and Larnell Stovall in Undisputed III, the series enlisted a new fight choreographer again, although Tim Mann had already collaborated with Adkins on Nu Image's Ninja: Shadow of a Tear.

Israeli actor Alon Moni Aboutboul, who was the primary antagonist in London Has Fallen, plays mob boss and main villain Zourab. Boyka: Undisputed marked the feature debut of British bodybuilder Martyn Ford, who is billed at 6 ft 8 in and 325 lb. His character's name, Koshmar, is Russian for "Nightmare", which became his real-life nickname in the wake of the film's release.

Principal photography took place in Bulgaria at Nu Boyana Film Studios. It was scheduled to commence on June 29, 2015, and concluded on July 31. On November 10, 2015, it was announced that the film had completed post-production. It is dedicated to veteran Nu Image producer Danny Lerner, who had died during pre-production.

== Release ==
=== Theatrical ===
On September 22, 2016, the film premiered at the Fantastic Fest in Austin, Texas. The film was also released theatrically in some Middle Eastern markets on July 27, 2017.

=== Home media ===
Universal Pictures Home Entertainment released the film in the U.S. on Blu-ray and DVD on August 1, 2017, under the title Boyka: Undisputed 4.

== Reception ==
=== Accolades ===
Boyka: Undisputed won the Best Fight Award, while Scott Adkins won the Jackie Chan Best Action Movie Actor Award for his portrayal of Yuri Boyka at the 2017 Shanghai Film Festival.

== Future ==
A TV-series that will continue the story of the Undisputed movie franchise was announced with original producer Millennium and London-based sales banner Empire Films. The series would follow Boyka seizing a parole to explore the underground fighting circuit of New York City.

In 2024, Adkins stated he was pushing for a fifth film, believing "there's still a good story to tell", but without having producers on board yet.
