= Freefall (1994 film) =

- Video release poster
- Directed by: John Irvin
- Written by: David Zito; Les Weldon
- Produced by: David Zito; Les Weldon
- Starring: Eric Roberts; Jeff Fahey; Pamela Gidley
- Cinematography: Yossi Wein
- Edited by: Graham Walker
- Music by: Lee Holdridge
- Production companies: October Films; Nu Image Films
- Distributed by: Vidmark Entertainment
- Release date: May 25, 1994
- Running time: 96 minutes
- Country: United States
- Language: English

Freefall is a 1994 American direct-to-video action film starring Eric Roberts, Jeff Fahey and Pamela Gidley. It is directed by John Irvin, written and produced by David Zito and Les Weldon.

== Plot ==
Wildlife photographer Katy Mazur is sent to Africa on an assignment by her fiancé Dex Dellum to track down the rare bird falcon talon. While there, she meets a parachuter named Grant Orion, whom she has an affair with. Little does she know, he is there to rescue her from becoming a target of an assassin organisation.

== Release ==
Originally intended for a theatrical release, the movie was released straight to VHS in the United States by Vidmark Entertainment and in Canada that same year by Cineplex Odeon. In 2002, Platinum Disc released a DVD of the film.

It was also released straight to video in the UK by Medusa Home Video.
