= Martyn Ford (bodybuilder) =

British bodybuilder, social media personality, actor (born 1982)

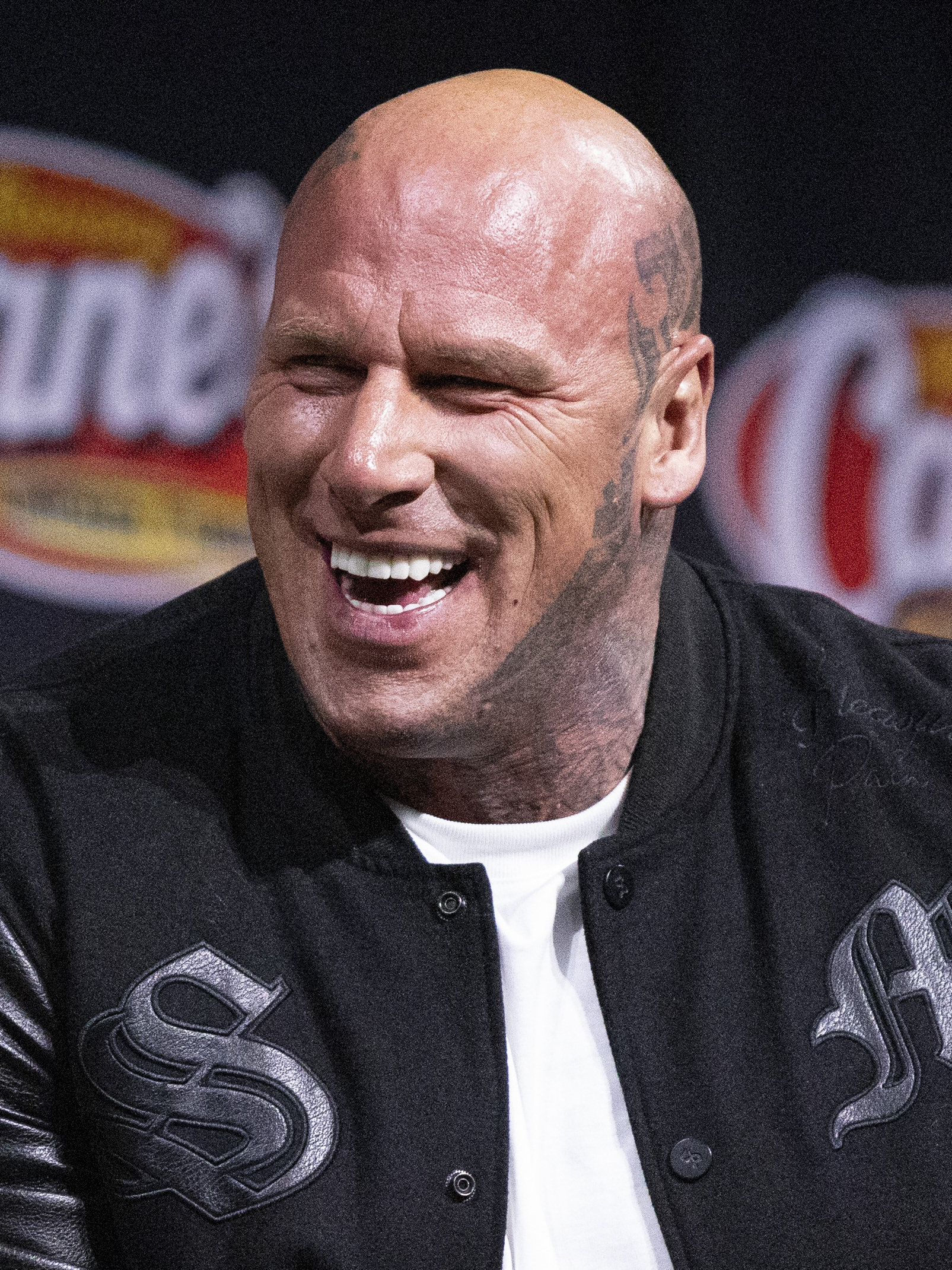
- Ford at the 2025 New York Comic Con
- Born: 26 May 1982 (age 44); Minworth, Birmingham, England
- Other name: "The Nightmare"
- Occupation: Bodybuilder • social media personality • actor
- Professional bodybuilder

Best statistics
- Height: 6 ft 8 in (203 cm)
- Weight: 350 lb (159 kg)

Martyn Ford (born 26 May 1982) is a British bodybuilder, social media personality, and actor. Ford gained significant attention and recognition for his physical stature and height, standing at around 6 feet 8 inches (203 cm) tall. He is often referred to as "The Nightmare" through the Boyka films, and he portrays Shao Kahn, the main antagonist of Mortal Kombat II.

== Biography ==
Ford was born in Minworth, Birmingham.

Ford had a background in cricket. As a teenager, he was an opening bowler playing for Warwickshire youth team. His hope of a cricketing career ended after he suffered a series of life events including a groin injury, glandular fever and a break-up. A period of depression and anorexia followed, before he moved into bodybuilding and transformed his physique. Ford became a trainer and quickly made a name for himself in the fitness industry. Ford became widely known for his extreme physique, particularly his massive size and muscularity. He has competed in various bodybuilding competitions and has amassed a substantial following on social media platforms such as Instagram, where he shares his fitness journey and motivates his fans.

Beyond his involvement in bodybuilding, Ford has also ventured into acting. He has appeared in a number of films, including Undisputed IV (2016), Kingsman: The Golden Circle (2017), and Redcon-1 (2018). He is regarded as a prominent figure in the fitness and bodybuilding community, known for his dedication to training and his ability to transform his physique.

== Acting career ==
In 2016, Ford made his debut in the film industry with a role in Boyka: Undisputed, where he portrayed the character Koshmar. Following his debut, he continued to build his acting portfolio with appearances in various films. In 2018, he appeared in Robin Hood: The Rebellion, playing the character Brimstone, and featured in the action-comedy film Kill Ben Lyk, where he portrayed the character Bale. That same year, he was also seen in The Marine 6: Close Quarters as Oscar Hayes, alongside renowned professional wrestlers Shawn Michaels, Becky Lynch, and actor Mike 'The Miz' Mizanin.

Ford's involvement in the film industry expanded further in 2018 when he appeared in Final Score, starring alongside Pierce Brosnan, Ray Stevenson, and Dave Bautista. In the film, Ford portrayed the character Vlad. Additionally, he showcased his acting skills in the zombie horror film Redcon-1 as Corporal Jacob Gallagher. In 2021, Martyn became part of the Fast & Furious franchise with his role as Lieutenant Sue in F9: The Fast Saga.

Aside from films, he has also made appearances in television series. In 2021, he joined the cast of The Nevers, a fantasy drama series, where he portrayed the character Nicholas Perbal (also called "Odium") in three episodes.

In June 2023, he was announced as the actor to portray the video game character Shao Kahn in the sequel to the 2021 Mortal Kombat film. In 2025, Ford appeared in House of David, the Amazon Prime Video historical biblical drama series set in the ancient Kingdom of Israel. Ford's imposing 6-foot-6-inch physique made him well suited to portray Goliath, the Philistine warrior who was defeated by David. Ford again appeared as Goliath in the second season, released in October 2025, and was subsequently confirmed to return in the role for an upcoming third season in 2026.

== Filmography ==
=== Film ===
Year	Title	Role	Notes
2016	Boyka: Undisputed	Koshmar	
2017	Kingsman: The Golden Circle	Glastonbury Guard	
2018	Accident Man	Masseuse	
2018	Redcon-1	Corporal Jacob Gallagher	
2018	Viking Destiny	Torstein Steiner	
2018	Final Score	Vlad	
2018	The Marine 6: Close Quarters	Oscar Hayes	
2018	Kill Ben Lyk	Bale	
2018	Robin Hood: The Rebellion	Brimstone	
2020	The Intergalactic Adventures of Max Cloud	Musculor	
2021	F9	Lieutenant Sue	
2023	The Machine	Sponge	
2025	Red Sonja	General Karlak	
2026	Mortal Kombat II	Shao Kahn	

=== Television ===
Year	Title	Role	Notes
2016	Of Kings and Prophets	Goliath	1 episode
2017	Benidorm	Hercules	1 episode
2017	Blood Drive	The Ogre	1 episode
2021–2023	The Nevers	Nicholas Perbal 'Odium'	4 episodes
2022	The Sandman	Squatterbloat	1 episode
2024	Those About to Die	Flamma	Main cast
2025	House of David	Goliath	Main cast
