= Wanted Man (film) =

2024 film by Dolph Lundgren

- Theatrical release poster
- Directed by: Dolph Lundgren
- Written by: Dolph Lundgren; Michael Worth; Hank Hugues
- Produced by: Dolph Lundgren; Craig Baumgarten
- Starring: Dolph Lundgren; Christina Villa; Kelsey Grammer; Michael Paré; Roger Cross; Aaron McPherson
- Cinematography: Joe M. Han
- Edited by: Darren C. Bui
- Music by: Sacha Chaban
- Production companies: Millennium Media; Wonder Street
- Distributed by: Quiver Distribution
- Release date: January 19, 2024
- Running time: 85 minutes
- Country: United States
- Language: English
- Box office: $13,204

Wanted Man is a 2024 American action film starring and directed by Dolph Lundgren, who also wrote the screenplay with Michael Worth.

The film was released by Quiver Distribution in select theaters and on video on demand in the United States on January 19, 2024.

== Plot ==
In the midst of a drug deal between two parties exchanging cash for illegal drugs, masked men with guns suddenly appear and shoot all of them to death, despite one who claims to be a DEA agent involved in a sting operation. Two girls are then seen fleeing from the scene, and are pursued by the masked men, but manage to escape.

Detective Travis is called by his boss Hernandez, who informs him that DEA agents were killed during a drug bust operation, and that Travis should bring the two missing witnesses who have now been caught shoplifting in Mexico. Travis meets up with his pals Hilts, Brynner and Tinelli at a night club and chats with them about his case.

The next day, Travis meets a police officer who has two women handcuffed - Rosa and Leticia, the witnesses to the drug-related crime. While they are all driving to San Diego, another police car catches up with them, and two criminals disguised as police officers kill Leticia and wound Travis.

Later, Travis wakes up at a home, handcuffed to the bed. Rosa informs him that they're now in her cousin's home, her brother is a cop, and that she doesn't want to go anywhere with Travis. She says she saw DEA murders - and the shooters were actually American cops. She heard one of the killers recognize a DEA agent saying, "We used to work together" while killing him. Travis believes her, and suggests she enter witness protection.

While having lunch at the Mexican home, several men from the drug cartels demand the family surrender Travis to them. In the ensuing shootout, Rosa's cousin dies, and her brother is wounded, but they're able to kill most of the gang members. Rosa and Travis decide to drive back to the US, and as they stop to make a call to Hernandez, Rosa says she doesn't trust American cops, so Travis calls his buddies Brynner, Hilts and Tinelli instead.

Travis and Rosa stop over for the night, and the next morning are contacted by Hilts, Tinelli and Brynner. All of them start driving to the border, when Rosa sees Brynner's bracelet and remembers him from the first shooting in which the DEA agent is killed. She cryptically tells Travis that these are "wolves", implying that Brynner and others were responsible for murdering the DEA agent. Travis requests the car be pulled over, and Brynner confesses that he was the one that killed the DEA agent, demanding that Travis allow him to kill Rosa to ensure there are no witnesses. But Travis fights back, and in the scuffle, Hilts, Brynner and Tinelli are all shot and killed.

Rosa and Travis leave at midnight via an illegal Coyote border crossing, but are caught by American immigrant police. Fortunately, they explain themselves and are freed from custody.

Five months later, back in the USA, Hernandez Congratulates Travis for his role in bringing the criminals to justice. Rosa says the DA cut her a deal so she can soon be a US citizen. Travis and Rosa head out for coffee.

== Cast ==
- Dolph Lundgren as Detective Travis Johansen
- Christina Villa as Rosa
- Kelsey Grammer as Brynner
- Michael Paré as Tinelli
- Roger Cross as Hernandez
- Aaron McPherson as Hilts

== Production ==
=== Filming ===
Principal photography took place in Las Cruces, New Mexico in May 2022.

== Release ==
In November 2023, Quiver Distribution acquired North American distribution rights to the film, scheduling it for a simultaneous release in select theatres and on video on demand on January 19, 2024.

== Reception ==
On the review aggregator website Rotten Tomatoes, 7% of 14 critics' reviews are positive, with an average rating of 3.9/10.
