= Mykel Shannon Jenkins =

American actor (born 1969)

- Born: Mykel Shannon Jenkins; July 3, 1969 (age 57); Biloxi, Mississippi U.S.
- Years active: 1999 — present

Mykel Shannon Jenkins (born July 3, 1969) is an American actor and filmmaker whose professional career started when he became winner of the first season of the SOAPnet series I Wanna Be a Soap Star. Jenkin's career spans across numerous film and television productions, from soaps to network television to independent and studio films.

== Career ==
His prize for winning I Wanna Be a Soap Star was a 13-week-contract on General Hospital as Officer Byron Murphy. His character was killed at the end of his contract in 2005. In 2023 he was recast in a new role, a physical therapist for Curtis Ashford, a character on the show played by Donnell Turner.

After Jenkin's first run on General Hospital, he was cast in The Bold and the Beautiful on 2007, playing officer Charlie Baker.

In 2010, he co-starred with Scott Adkins in the direct-to-video martial arts film Undisputed III: Redemption.

In 2017 Jenkins was in several projects, playing B.B. in Same Kind of Different as Me along with Greg Kinnear and Renée Zellweger, Detective Dawkins in The Wrong Mother for Lifetime Television, Dr. Orson in Teleios, and as Mickey James in The Gods, a film he also wrote and produced. In 2021 Jenkins played Jim in Bao Tran's action comedy The Paper Tigers, released by Well Go USA Entertainment. The sequel of The Gods, The Gods II, was released in 2023 by Echelon Studios.

Jenkins is slated to co-star with Morgan Freeman and Luke Hemsworth on Gunner, a film directed by Dimitri Logothetis.

== Personal life ==
Jenkins graduated from Loyola University in New Orleans, Louisiana.

== Filmography ==
- Double Jeopardy (1999) as Doorman
- Baller Blockin' (2000) as Garr
- Employee Dang (2003) as Mike
- I Wanna Be a Soap Star (2004) as himself
- General Hospital (2004–05) as Officer Byron Murphy
- Stuck In The Suburbs (2004) as V.J.
- Mr. 3000 (2004) as Reporter
- Gang Warz (2004) as Dex
- Dad's Positive (2006) as Brother
- Behind Enemy Lines: Axis of Evil (2006) as Meideros
- Family Curse (2006) as Arthur
- Lucky You (2007) as Gary
- The Bold and the Beautiful (2007-2012) as Detective Charlie Baker
- The Great Observer (2008) (post-production) as Frankie Duson
- Undisputed III: Redemption (2010) as Jericho 'Turbo' Jones
- Kick Ass 2 (2013) as James
- The Masked Saint (2016) as Detective Harper
- The Last Heist (2016) as Unknown
- Teleios (2016) as Dr. Orson
- The Gods (2017) as Mickey James
- A Christmas Ball (2017) as Sam
- Same Kind of Different as Me (2017) as B.B.
- The Paper Tigers (2020) as Jim
- The Gods II: The Dark Side (2023) as Mickey James

== Guest appearances ==
- I'm with Her (2003) Attendant
- I Wanna Be a Soap Star (2004) Himself
- Dr. Vegas (2004) Darell 'Sandman' Bay
- Medical Investigation (2004) David Thorn
- General Hospital (2004–2005) Officer Byron Murphy
- Soap Talk (2005) Himself
- Charmed (Episode: "Still Charmed & Kicking" and "Malice in Wonderland") (2005) Paul Haas
- In Justice (2006) Billy Daniels
- CSI: Miami (2006) Chris Ryder
- Ugly Betty (Episodes: "Petra-Gate" and "A Tree Grows in Guadalajara") (2007) Tavares
- McDonald's Commercial (2012) New Spicy Chicken McBites, Pool Game
