= Lloyd Ahern II =

American cinematographer (born 1942)

Lloyd Ahern
- Born: Lloyd Nickolas Ahern; June 7, 1942 (age 84); Los Angeles, California, US
- Occupation: Cinematographer
- Father: Lloyd Ahern

Lloyd Ahern II (June 7, 1942) is an American cinematographer. He is the son of late cinematographer Lloyd Ahern (1905—1983).

== Filmography ==
=== Film ===
- Madso's War (2010)
- Fab Five: The Texas Cheerleader Scandal (2008)
- The Staircase Murders (2007)
- Broken Trail (2006)
- Undisputed (2002)
- The Unsaid (2001)
- Supernova (2000)
- Can't Hardly Wait (1998)
- Turbulence (1997)
- Last Man Standing (1996)
- Wild Bill (1995)
- Alien Nation: Dark Horizon (1994)
- White Mile (1994)
- Geronimo: An American Legend (1993)
- Trespass (1992)
- Fine Things (1990)

=== Television ===
- Drop Dead Diva (2012) - 13 Episodes
- The Glades (2011) - 4 Episodes
- Army Wives (2007-2009) - 29 Episodes
