= Valentin Ganev =

Bulgarian actor and director

- Валентин Атанасов Ганев
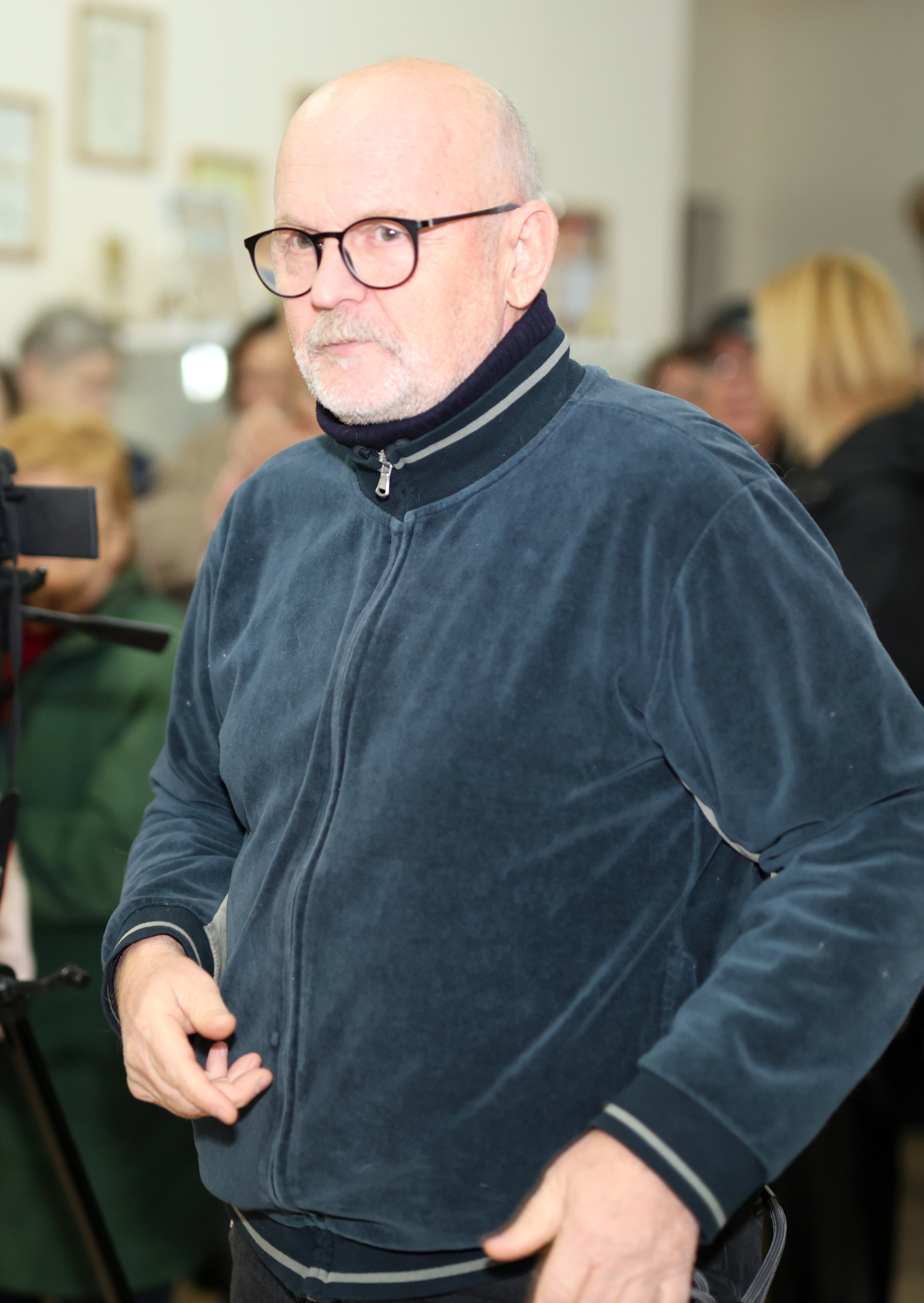
- Ganev in 2025
- Born: 7 April 1956 (age 69); Ruse, Bulgaria
- Occupation(s): Actor, director

Valentin Atanassov Ganev (Bulgarian: Валентин Атанасов Ганев; born 7 April 1956) is a Bulgarian theatre and film actor and theatre director.

== Career ==
Born in Ruse, Bulgaria, Ganev graduated from the All Russian State Institute for Cinematography, Moscow (actor's classes of Sergey Bondarchuk). He is known for his work on East/West (Est-Ouest) (1999), Icon (2005), Hushove (2006), The Abandoned (2006), The Prince & Me 3: A Royal Honeymoon (2008), The Way Back (2010), J'étais à Nüremberg (2010) etc. He is quite active on stage. Since 1996 he has been an actor at The National Theatre of Bulgaria.

== Filmography ==
Film
Year	Title	Role	Notes
1999	Est-Ouest	Volodya Petrov	
2003	In Hell	Bolt	
2004	Spartacus	Marcus Servius	
2005	Icon	Vladimir Tonkin	
2006	The Abandoned	Andrei Misharin / Kolya Kaidavosky	
2006	Undisputed II: Last Man Standing	Warden Markov	
2009	Ninja	Yuri Klimitov	
2010	Undisputed III: Redemption	Warden Markov	
2011	The Task	Warden	
2012	El Gringo	Deputy Chief Logan	
2014	Firequake	Zeleny	TV film
2014	Asylum	Priest	
2015	The Throwaways	Bulgarian Official	
2016	Beyond Valkyrie: Dawn of the 4th Reich	Bishop Grün	
2016	King of the Belgians	Kerim	
2017	Boyka: Undisputed	Warden Markov	
