= Undisputed (film) =

2002 film by Walter Hill

- Theatrical release poster
- Directed by: Walter Hill
- Written by: David Giler; Walter Hill
- Produced by: David Giler; Walter Hill; Brad Krevoy; Andrew Sugarman
- Starring: Wesley Snipes; Ving Rhames; Peter Falk; Michael Rooker; Jon Seda; Wes Studi; Fisher Stevens; Master P
- Cinematography: Lloyd Ahern II
- Edited by: Freeman A. Davies; Phil Norden
- Music by: Stanley Clarke
- Production companies: Millennium Films; Hollywood Partners; Amen Ra Films; Motion Picture Corporation of America
- Distributed by: Miramax Films
- Release date: August 23, 2002
- Running time: 90 minutes
- Country: United States
- Language: English
- Budget: $15-20 million
- Box office: $14.9 million

Undisputed is a 2002 American sports drama film written, produced and directed by Walter Hill. The film stars Wesley Snipes, Ving Rhames, Peter Falk, Michael Rooker, Jon Seda, Wes Studi, Fisher Stevens, and Master P.

Undisputed was released in the United States by Miramax Films on August 23, 2002. The film performed poorly at the box-office and received mixed reviews from critics; nevertheless, it later found success in the home video market. It is the first installment in the Undisputed franchise, which includes three sequels.

== Plot ==
Heavyweight boxing champion George 'The Iceman' Chambers is convicted of rape and sentenced to six to eight years at Sweetwater, a new prison in the Mojave desert. The high-security facility is populated by hardened criminals. Unaware of the prison's ways and its unique hierarchy, the pompous and bratty Chambers tries to impress upon the inmates his status as a champion boxer.

The prison camp holds boxing matches involving inmates, around which a betting syndicate operates. The matches have few rules and provide a lucrative venture for the syndicate. The most popular boxer in the prison is the soft-spoken, humble and undefeated Monroe "Undisputed" Hutchen, who is placed in solitary confinement after Chambers picks a fight with him in the mess hall. Flashbacks to Hutchen's brief boxing career reveal that he was sentenced to life imprisonment without the possibility of parole for beating to death a man who was sleeping with his girlfriend.

Sensing the brewing hatred for the heavyweight champion, an incarcerated mob boss named Mendy Ripstein senses potential in a match between Hutchen and Chambers. Ripstein, a lifelong boxing fan, proposes a match and Warden Lipscomb is persuaded to look the other way.

As all the arrangements are finally organized, an eagerly awaited fight night arrives. Chambers knocks down Hutchen twice (and with the London Prize Ring Rules, each knockdown counts as the end of a round, as the boxer is given only 60 seconds to get up). In the third round, Hutchen charges back and knocks Chambers down for the first time in his career, sending the crowd of prisoners into a frenzy. Finally, in the fourth round Hutchen officially KO's Chambers and stays the undisputed champion.

Ripstein's Mexican assistant reveals; in a narrator voice, that Ripstein died three weeks after the fight, but in his will, he left him $2 million. Chambers was released on parole, and Hutchen received the money for his sister, who was experiencing hardship.

It is also revealed that Chambers and his manager denied that the fight with Hutchen ever occurred, and that it was all a rumor. Months later, Chambers wins back the Heavyweight Championship of the World. The whole cell block watches the televised fight, and cheer Monroe's name after hearing Chambers being crowned the "undisputed" heavyweight champion of the world.

== Cast ==
- Wesley Snipes as Monroe "Undisputed" Hutchen
- Ving Rhames as George "The Iceman" Chambers
- Peter Falk as Mendy Ripstein
- Michael Rooker as Captain A.J. Mercker
- Jon Seda as Jesus "Chuy" Campos
- Wes Studi as Mingo Pace
- Fisher Stevens as James "Ratbag" Kroycek
- Master P as Gat Boyz Rapper 1
- Silkk the Shocker as Gat Boyz Rapper 2
- C-Murder as Gat Boyz Rapper 3
- Ed Lover as Marvin Bonds
- Byron Minns as Eddie Jones / Saladin
- Steve Heinze as Carlos
- Michael Bailey Smith as Willard Bechtel
- Nils Allen Stewart as Vern Van Zant
- Johnathan Wesley Wallace as Antoine Bonet
- Johnny Williams as Al
- Joe D'Angerio as Vinnie
- Dayton Callie as Yank Lewis
- Denis Arndt as Warden Lipscomb
- Bruce A. Young as Charles Soward
- Amy Aquino as Darlene Early
- Taylor Young as Emily Byrne
- Susan Dalian as Jonelle Hutchen
- Rose Rollins as Tawnee Rawlins
- Sandra Vidal as Fight Fan
- Peter Jason as Oakland TV Announcer
- Maureen O'Boyle as herself
- Jim Lampley as himself

== Production ==
=== Development and writing ===
The film was based on an original script by Walter Hill and David Giler. Hill had just come off the science fiction film Supernova on which he had been recut by Francis Ford Coppola among others. "One, it was embarrassing and, two, it made me think about quitting," said Hill. "While Coppola's intentions were honorable, I think he made a bad situation worse. I didn't do anything for a year. I was fortunate enough that I could buy my children a hot lunch. Then, I decided I wanted to work again."

Hill had always wanted to make a boxing film, being a fan of the sport since he was young. "Boxing is easy to indict," says Hill. "There are a lot of terrible things about boxing. However, that's only one side of the coin. The other side is that boxing has a power and a beauty and a drama and fascination that makes it a very compelling sport."

Hill and Giler were having lunch one day and discussed Mike Tyson, who was sentenced to prison for rape in 1992. Giler said they thought "it's amazing how no studio has made a film out of this basic situation of the heavyweight champion of the world going to prison, the toughest environment in the world," said Giler. Hill went and wrote some paragraphs about the idea then he and Giler wrote a full script.

However Hill says while the Tyson case was the departure point, "There are a number of prize fighters who have been in trouble with the law. Our story looks at how a tough guy and celebrity would handle life in prison. The more we wrote, the more we wrote away from the Tyson story." Hill says he was really interested in what happened when "a heavyweight champion goes to the toughest environment possible in American culture, the American prison system."

"What we tried to show is how, under odd circumstances, a convicted murderer and a convicted rapist are capable of a moment of grace," said Hill. "They're both heroic."

The film refuses to say if the champion boxer was actually guilty. "It is absolutely ambiguous in this movie, ambiguous in the sense that it is very clear that he believes himself to be innocent. It is also absolutely clear that the woman involved believes herself to have been abused and raped... If you want to know what I suspect, I suspect they're both right. It has to do with different terms, different values and different understanding of the basic compact when men and women go to bed together."

=== Casting ===
Hill said the film needed to be cast with black actors to have "serious credibility," and that he "was determined not to have a movie where it looked like the actors couldn't box." He took the treatment to Wesley Snipes who was interested in the story even before the script had been written. "I told him it was conceivable that he could play either [lead] role, but what will not change is the fight and who wins in the end," Hill said.

Hill then sent the script to Ving Rhames, who called back the next day, saying he wanted to play the Ice Man; Snipes was happy to play the other role. Rhames was in peak physical condition having been preparing for two years to star in a film about Sonny Liston, Night Train, that ultimately was never made. He said that Undisputed was "not Rocky... It's not clear-cut who you're supposed to root for." He had worked together with Snipes on Broadway earlier, the last time in 1986 in The Boys of Winter.

It was a battle to get the film financed with two black stars, particularly as the film need to appeal to international audiences. "There was a lot of pressure to change one of the characters to be white," Giler said, "but we thought it would be unrealistic... We haven't seen a white fighter of merit since Rocky Marciano." Hill said that "heavyweight boxing within the past 50 years has been the purview of black men with a couple of tiny exceptions. This is a movie about boxing so we wanted to get it right. I think that the idea of the heavyweight champion of the world not being a black man would seem extraordinary. But if you did cast a black man as the heavyweight champion and then out him into a prison where the prison champion is white guy - well, what are we talking about?" There was also pressure to make the film less "tough".

Snipes recalled, "The film was on. It was off. The money came. The money fell out. Every day, it was a wonder we were making this movie. Then, after we made the film, nobody knew whether it was ever going to come out." He prepared for the role by training with Emanuel Steward, who had trained 29 world champions, including Wladimir Klitschko, Tommy Hearns and Lennox Lewis. "[My character] was supposed to be the best," Snipes said, "so if I've got to look like the best, and live up to this character, I've got to get the best and work with the best." Rhames was already in peak condition due to preparing for the aborted Liston film; the film's fight choreographer Cole McKay took over training of Rhames once filming began.

=== Filming ===
Undisputed was going to be filmed in a closed-down prison in Jean, Nevada. However, according to Jeanne Corcoran, the Nevada Film Office's production manager, the prison "didn't have the right look. It has a great fence, a good tower, but the interiors tend to be more dormitory-like." Instead it was decided to shoot the film in an unopened wing of the medium-security High Desert State Prison in Indian Springs, Nevada.

Shooting took place in January and February 2001. The film was shot over 39 days with finance raised from a number of American and European companies.

During the final fight, Snipes weighed only 178 pounds while Rhames was around 220 pounds. To mask the disparity, fight choreographer Cole McKay had Snipes fight upright and Rhames hunch forward in a crouching stance. For the final fight, Snipes said he and McKay would "choreograph six or seven movements and then we'd improvise. We improvised the tail-end of each round, and that gave a certain amount of spontaneity and reality to it."

Neither actor used a body double, and all of the body shots are real. "Everybody on the set was wanting to see, 'Man who's going to win the fight?' " Steward recalls. "There were no 'John Wayne punches' in this movie at all. It was the closest that I have ever saw to real fightin'. I was mad because we didn't have [someone] to knock out for real."

Hill later said, "Some say Hollywood movies that are made about boxing are just metaphors for other things, I think I've made one that's actually about boxing and not a metaphor."

=== Post-production ===
Distribution rights were purchased by Miramax Films for a reported $4.5 million. There were press reports that Miramax head Harvey Weinstein wanted additional scenes reshot which made Wesley Snipes more sympathetic, but that Snipes refused to do them.

== Music ==
A soundtrack containing hip hop music was released on August 20, 2002, by Universal Records. It peaked at No. 101 on the Billboard 200 and #41 on the Top R&B/Hip-Hop Albums.

== Reception ==
=== Box office ===
The film debuted at number 8 at the box office making $4.7 million in its first week.

=== Critical response ===
The film received mixed reviews. Rotten Tomatoes gives the film a score of 50% based on reviews from 106 critics. The site's consensus is: "While not the deepest boxing movie out there, Undisputed is successful at hitting its aspiration of being nothing more than a genre picture." Metacritic, which uses a weighted average, assigned the film a score of 58 out of 100, based on 29 critics, indicating "mixed or average" reviews. Audiences polled by CinemaScore gave the film an average grade of "B" on an A+ to F scale.

Hill said he was "very happy about" the film. "I mean no film is beyond criticism, but I think we've made a very modest movie. Heck, we did it in 39 days, it cost $20 million, which is very cheap for Hollywood standards, and tells a good story. I guess it's the literary equivalent of a short story... With all the action in it and the tough guy aspects, it's going to appeal mainly to a young male audience. But, also the nostalgia of the sport might appeal to older males. Based on some of the reviews I've read already, the women don't seem to be enjoying it as much. But you hope for the best."

== Sequels ==
The film received three direct-to-video sequels, with a focus more centered on Mixed Martial Arts rather than boxing. The first was Undisputed II: Last Man Standing, which was released in 2006. A second sequel, Undisputed III: Redemption, was released in 2010, and follows Undisputed II's Yuri Boyka as the main character. A third sequel, again focusing on the latter character, Boyka: Undisputed, was released in 2017.

== See also ==
- List of boxing films
