= Undisputed III: Redemption =

2010 film by Isaac Florentine

- Official DVD cover
- Directed by: Isaac Florentine
- Written by: David N. White
- Produced by: Israel Ringel
- Starring: Scott Adkins; Mykel Shannon Jenkins; Mark Ivanir; Hristo Shopov; Robert Costanzo; Marko Zaror
- Cinematography: Ross W. Clarkson
- Edited by: Irit Raz
- Music by: Minos Matsas
- Production companies: Millennium Films; Nu Image
- Distributed by: Warner Home Video
- Release dates: April 17, 2010 (ActionFest); June 1, 2010 (United States)
- Running time: 92 minutes
- Country: United States
- Language: English
- Box office: $285,709

Undisputed III: Redemption is a 2010 American martial arts action film directed by Isaac Florentine and starring Scott Adkins, Mykel Shannon Jenkins, Mark Ivanir and Hristo Shopov. It is the sequel to Undisputed II: Last Man Standing (2007), and the third installment overall in the Undisputed franchise.

== Plot ==
Years after his defeat by George "Iceman" Chambers, Yuri Boyka, now a prison janitor, hears about the Prison Spetz Competition (PSC), an inter-prison fighting tournament offering a chance at early release. Boyka trains privately to recover from his knee injury, while shaving his long hair and beard off, and challenges the Russian prison's current PSC champion, Vladimir Sykov, defeating him and becoming the Russian representative.

At Gorgon prison in Georgia, Boyka joins a group of international fighters and come face to face with Warden Kuss. They face harsh conditions as they are forced to work in the quarry while Colombian fighter Raul "Dolor" Quiñones receives special treatment and drugs. Boyka clashes with American fighter Jericho "Turbo" Jones, but they eventually develop trust and train together. Boyka learns that the tournament is fixed for-profit in Dolor's favor and confronts the organizers with the help of mob bosses Gaga and Gio Farnatti. Boyka and Turbo advance in the tournament along with Dolor and Brazilian fighter Rodrigo Silva while the losers are taken to a secluded area and executed.

Turbo and Boyka are thrown into solitary confinement after a fight but are released due to their managers' influence. Kuss then urges Gaga and Farnetti to liquify their assets and bet on Dolor. Boyka realizes the managers only care about their profit and plans to defeat Dolor. During the semi-finals, Boyka wins against Silva and offers him respect. Silva is later taken to the secluded spot and shot dead. The organizers arrange for Turbo to be beaten by guards. A bruised and battered Turbo could barely hold his own when training, and knowing he wouldn't stand a chance against Dolor, Boyka plots an escape for him. Boyka and Turbo learn from one of the inmates that losing fighters tend to "disappear" so left with no other option, they fight the guards in the quarry. Boyka and even some of the prisoners help Turbo escape.

Boyka is apprehended and forced to fight Dolor in the final round. Dolor takes the lead, exploiting Boyka's weak knee and knocking him out of the ring. However, Boyka adapts by using a blood-soaked pad as a brace and employs a new fighting style. Boyka defeats Dolor by breaking his tibia after Dolor attempts a leg check, ruining the managers' bets. A distraught Farnatti barges into the Warden's office to kill him and winds up killing Rezo and his bodyguard but is shot dead by Kuss. Boyka is denied his freedom for his part in orchestrating Turbo's escape and is taken to the secluded spot to be executed, but Turbo rescues him by killing Kuss and his guards. They meet Gaga, who reveals he bet on Boyka all along. Boyka and Turbo part on good terms, vowing to have a future match. Boyka runs towards freedom with his share of the money, laughing joyfully.

== Cast ==
- Scott Adkins as Yuri Boyka, a gifted Russian fighter and protagonist, still recovering from an injury in the prior film
- Mykel Shannon Jenkins as Jericho "Turbo" Jones, the hot-headed American fighter
- Hristo Shopov as Kuss, the corrupt Warden of the Gorgon Prison in Tbilisi, Georgia
- Vernon Dobtcheff as Rezo, a Georgian Mafia boss and Dolor's representative who is fixing the fights
- Velislav Pavlov as Chief Guard
- Nikolai Sotirov as Announcer
- Esteban Cueto as Vladimir Sykov, the dominant fighter at the prison Boyka was being held at, who would have become the Russian competitor if Boyka did not challenge and defeat him.
- Plamen Manasiyev as Lead Parole Board Manager
- Valentin Ganev as Markov, Warden of the Chornya Cholmni Prison in Russia
- Stefan Shterev as Sports Book Clerk
- Dimo Dimov as Gaga's Bodyguard
- Yordan Zahariev as Referee #1
- Pavel Doichev as Referee #2
- Lateef Crowder as Rodrigo Silva, Brazilian fighter who uses capoeira.
- Ilram Choi as Chai Lam, North Korean fighter who uses taekwondo, he is easily eliminated by Dolor
- Anton Trendafilov as Old Waterman
- Ivan Zaharov as Musician #1
- Nikolay Petrov as Musician #2
- Kiril Efremov as Guard #1
- Michael Baral as Casino Manager
- Vladimir Bonev as Businessman (uncredited)
- Tihomir Vinchev as Andrei Kraitz (uncredited), Croatian fighter who is defeated by Turbo
- Borislav Iliev as Prison Guard #1 (uncredited)
- Trayan Milenov-Troy as Jean Dupont (uncredited), French fighter who is defeated by Boyka
- Radoslav Parvanov as Petros Mavros (uncredited), Greek fighter who is defeated by Silva
- Velizar Peev as Prison Guard #2 (uncredited)
- Marko Zaror as Raul "Dolor" Quiñones, the psychotic Colombian fighter and enforcer of the Cali Cartel who the sponsors are favoring to win
- Mark Ivanir as Gaga, a Russian Mafia boss and prison owner who represents Boyka
- Robert Costanzo as Gio Farnatti, an Italian American Mafia boss who represents "Turbo"

== Release ==
It was released in the United States on June 1, 2010.

== Reception ==
=== Box office ===
The film grossed $282,548 in Lebanon and United Arab Emirates.

=== Critical response ===
James Marsh of Screen Anarchy praised Florentine's direction for capturing the "flow and [the] combinations" of the "innovative, exciting and technically groundbreaking battles" and his cast of charismatic action stars, singling out Zaror for having "a natural eye-catching screen quality that's hard to ignore", concluding that: "[A]s someone who normally demands genuine drama from real characters along with his martial arts, I was overpowered, overwhelmed and left battered and bleeding at the total mercy of this movie. Resistance is futile. Undisputed 3: Redemption rules." Bill Gibron of DVD Talk gave note of the film being "simplified cinema set up to achieve certain stock goals", concluding that: "Undisputed III promises nothing more than a series of well filmed beatdowns, and delivers on every account. It might not be rocket science, but it's not Rocky either. Instead of finesse, all we get here is fighting - and that's perfectly fine."

=== Accolades ===
Undisputed III won Best Director Award and Best Fight Choreographer in the 2010 edition of ActionFest.

== Sequel ==
According to Movie Cricket, Adkins confirmed that there will be a fourth installment to the Undisputed series. On May 29, 2014, When asked whether there would be an Undisputed 4, Adkins replied, "Yes, it is definitely something we are pursuing. We are working on the script at the moment trying to get all the departments happy with what we are trying to do. It’s taking longer than I want to be honest but you know it is difficult financing these films. In this day and age those type of straight to DVD films don’t make the sort of money they used to make in the 90s/early 2000s. So it is a bit of a precarious business at the moment and that is why it is taking so long but we are definitely all trying to get it going because we appreciate what following that character of Boyka has and you know, I love playing that character and I can’t wait to return to him and we’ve got some good ideas on where to take the character."

Production had begun on Boyka: Undisputed in June 2015 with Scott Adkins returning as Boyka. The plot involves the fighter, who is now free, attempting to go as a professional fighter when he accidentally kills someone in the ring. However, to make amends for what he has done, he must engage in a series of fights to save the wife of the man he killed. Shooting was completed in early August 2015 for a 2017 release date.
