= Millennium Media =

American film company

- Company logo
- Formerly: Nu Image (1992–2017)
- Type: Private
- Industry: Entertainment
- Predecessors: Equity Pictures (2003–2013)
- Founded: 1992; 34 years ago
- Founder: Avi Lerner; Trevor Short; Danny Dimbort; Danny Lerner
- Headquarters: Los Angeles, California, United States
- Key people: Avi Lerner; Trevor Short
- Products: Motion Pictures
- Subsidiaries: Millennium Films (1996–2017); Millennium Entertainment (2010–2014)
- Website: www.millennium-media.net

Millennium Media (formerly Nu Image and Millennium Films) is an American independent film production and financing company that was founded by Avi Lerner, Trevor Short, Danny Dimbort and Danny Lerner in 1992, and is one of Hollywood's longest running independent film companies. Millennium creates, produces, finances, and sells films worldwide. The company produces action films, most of which are filmed primarily in South Africa and Bulgaria (by 2005, it acquired Nu Boyana Film Studios), among other locations.

== History ==
=== Nu Metro Entertainment ===
In the mid-1980s, The Cannon Group, Inc. began expanding its operation into Africa, taking advantage of cheap locations and labor in countries such as Zimbabwe and South Africa. Avi Lerner opened Nu Metro Entertainment, a film production company based in Johannesburg to accommodate production demands in the countries. During this time, Lerner executive produced many films, such as American Ninja 2: The Confrontation and River of Death for Cannon as well as Howling IV: The Original Nightmare for Harry Alan Towers.

=== Nu Image ===
After pressure from anti-apartheid forces, Cannon closed its African operations in 1988, Lerner created a new company, Nu Image, to produce original, low budget films alongside his brother Danny Lerner and other Cannon employees Trevor Short, Danny Dimbort and Boaz Davidson.

From 1992, Nu Image began producing multiple films a year, mainly in the action genre. Many of its films went direct-to-video, however some, such as Shark Attack debuted on television. Many stars, writers and directors from The Cannon Group, Inc. appeared in films for Nu Image, including David Bradley, Michael Dudikoff, Sam Firstenberg and Billy Drago. They also built a new generation of action talent such as Bryan Genesse and Joe Lara.

However, their efforts to break into the mainstream with mockbusters such as Freefall starring Eric Roberts, Jeff Fahey and Pamela Gidley, created to capitalise on the success of Sylvester Stallone's Cliffhanger failed to make much of an impact. Freefall ended up going direct-to-video.

After the successes of creature features such as Anaconda and Deep Blue Sea released in the late 1990s, Nu Image produced a spate of low budget franchises to capitalise on the trend including; Tobe Hooper's Crocodile, Shark Attack, Spiders, Killer Rats, Octopus and Raging Sharks and various sequels were produced from 1999 to 2005. While not critically successful, the films were extremely successful on television and home media.

=== Millennium Films & Millennium Entertainment ===
In early 1996, Nu Image formed a subsidiary label, Millennium Films, for higher-budget productions. From the mid-2000s, the main Nu Image company gradually began producing fewer films, with Millennium Films releasing more with a greater level of financing than previously.

In 2005, it purchased Nu Boyana Film Studios in Bulgaria.

In March 2007, Nu Image acquired a controlling 52% stake in independent film and home video company First Look Studios. As a result, Nu Image and Millennium Films were given an additional outlet for home video and theatrical distribution.

One of the first films to be produced by Millennium Films was the remake The Wicker Man starring Nicolas Cage. The film was a critical and commercial failure. They continued on with a focus on sequels and remakes of notable properties such as Day of the Dead and Rambo. After the commercial success of Rambo, Millennium Films entered into a multi-year deal with Lionsgate to produce several big-budgeted films, the first of which was Conan the Barbarian. The deal would be extended over the years with successful box-office hits (The Mechanic) and box office bombs (The Legend of Hercules). Another notable success was Olympus Has Fallen starring Gerard Butler.

In November 2010, First Look filed for bankruptcy. Nu Image formed Millennium Entertainment, LLC to assume the assets of First Look.

Millennium Entertainment was sold in August 2014. The company's library and distribution assets had been sold to a consortium consisting of its current management and Virgo Investment Group. The new owners renamed the company Alchemy in January 2015, finally cutting ties to its former sister company Millennium Films, which remained under the control of Avi Lerner. Alchemy filed for Chapter 7 Bankruptcy on June 30, 2016.

=== Millennium Media ===
In 2017, a deal was reached with The Recon Group, a Chinese investment firm, for them to purchase a majority stake in the Millennium Films subsidiary. The deal was signed and a $20 million downpayment was secured. However, this deal was later announced to be off in August 2017 due to the Chinese government clamping down on overseas business investments. The same year, Millennium Films was merged into Nu Image to form Millennium Media.

In 2017, Millennium faced sexual harassment allegations alleging hostile workplace and rampant sexual harassment and gender disparity.

In 2018, actor Terry Crews testified in front of Congress that he had been threatened by Avi Lerner of Millennium Media not to testify in his sexual assault case.

== Films ==
Year	Title	Notes	Ref
1988	The Stay Awake		
1989	Crazy Camera (Ochlim Lokshim)		
1989	The Big Gag		
1989	Kill Slade		
1989	Funny Face		
1990	African Express		
1992	Lethal Ninja		
1993	You're Famous		
1993	Terminator Woman		
1993	That Englishwoman		
1993	Cyborg Cop	Direct-to-video	
1993	Point of Impact		
1994	Woman of Desire		
1994	Double Suspicion		
1994	Private Lessons II		
1994	Project Shadowchaser II	Direct-to-video	
1994	Freefall		
1994	F.T.W.		
1994	Warriors		
1994	Blood of the Innocent	Direct-to-video	
1994	Blood Run	Television film	
1994	Cyborg Cop II	Direct-to-video	
1994	Illicit Dreams		
1995	Never Say Die		
1995	Personal Vendetta	Television film	
1995	Lunarcop		
1995	Human Time Bomb	Direct-to-video	
1995	Wild Side		
1995	Search and Destroy		
1995	Septembers of Shiraz		
1995	Passover Fever (Leylasede)		
1995	Hard Justice	Direct-to-video	
1995	The Last Word		
1995	The Immortals		
1995	Raging Angels		
1995	Man with a Gun		
1995	Project Shadowchaser III	Direct-to-video	
1995	Cyborg Cop III	Direct-to-video	
1996	Dog Watch	Direct-to-video	
1996	Street Gun		
1996	Warhead		
1996	Hollow Point		
1996	Hello, She Lied	Television film	
1996	Danger Zone		
1996	Deadly Outbreak		
1996	Past Perfect	Direct-to-video	
1996	The Last Days of Frankie the Fly		
1996	Forest Warrior	Direct-to-video	
1996	Judge and Jury		
1996	Project Shadowchaser IV	Direct-to-video	
1997	Mossad		
1997	Plato's Run	Direct-to-video	
1997	Operation Delta Force	Television film	
1997	American Perfekt		
1997	Merchant of Death		
1997	Top of the World		
1997	The Maker		
1997	Lesser Prophets		
1997	Operation Delta Force 2: Mayday	Television film	
1997	The Peacekeeper		
1997	Deathline		
1997	Looking for Lola		
1998	Armstrong		
1998	Some Girl		
1998	Scar City		
1998	Operation Delta Force 3: Clear Target	Direct-to-video	
1998	Break Up		
1998	Shadrach		
1998	On the Border	Television film	
1998	No Code of Conduct		
1998	October 22		
1998	Sweepers		
1999	The 4th Floor		
1999	Guinevere		
1999	Shark Attack	Television film	
1999	Cold Harvest	Direct-to-video	
1999	Bridge of Dragons		
1999	The Big Brass Ring		
1999	Operation Delta Force 4: Deep Fault	Direct-to-video	
1999	Traitor's Heart		
1999	Cool Dog		
1999	Lima: Breaking the Silence		
2000	Operation Delta Force 5: Random Fire	Direct-to-video	
2000	U.S. Seals	Direct-to-video	
2000	Beat		
2000	The Alternate		
2000	Track Down		
2000	City of Fear	Direct-to-video	
2000	Married 2 Malcolm		
2000	Spiders		
2000	Forever Lulu		
2000	How to Kill Your Neighbor's Dog		
2000	Octopus	Television film	
2000	For the Cause	Direct-to-video	
2000	Shark Attack 2	Direct-to-video	
2000	Crocodile	Direct-to-video	
2001	Diamond Cut Diamond		
2001	Disaster		
2001	Sharkman	Television film	
2001	Nobodys Baby		
2001	Cold Heart		
2001	U.S. Seals II: The Ultimate Force	Direct-to-video	
2001	Skeletons in the Closet		
2001	Spiders II: Breeding Ground		
2001	Prozac Nation		
2001	Replicant		
2001	Edges of the Lord		
2001	The Grey Zone		
2001	Dead Awaker		
2001	Diary of a Sex Addict		
2001	Ticker		
2001	Octopus 2: River of Fear	Direct-to-video	
2001	The Order		
2001	Flying Virus		
2002	Submarines	Direct-to-video	
2002	Air Panic		
2002	Hard Cash	Direct-to-video	
2002	Derailed		
2002	Vampire Clan		
2002	Reality Check		
2002	Crocodile 2: Death Swamp		
2002	Undisputed		
2002	U.S. Seals 3: Frogmen	Direct-to-video	
2002	The Badge		
2002	All I Want		
2002	The Return from India (Ha-Shiva MeHodu)		
2002	Shark Attack 3: Megalodon	Direct-to-video	
2002	Windfall	Television film	
2003	Marines	Direct-to-video	
2003	Killer Rats		
2003	Death Train	Direct-to-video	
2003	Sumuru		
2003	Den of Lions	Direct-to-video	
2003	Special Forces		
2003	Detention		
2003	Alien Hunter		
2003	Out for a Kill	Direct-to-video	
2003	Air Marshal		
2003	Shark Zone	Direct-to-video	
2003	In Hell		
2003	Blind Horizon		
2003	Belly of the Beast	Direct-to-video	
2004	Nature Unleashed: Tornado	Direct-to-video	
2004	Nature Unleashed: Volcano	Direct-to-video	
2004	Alien Lockdown	Television film	
2004	Skeleton Man	Television film	
2004	Air Strike	Direct-to-video	
2004	Direct Action		
2004	Shadow of Fear		
2004	Nature Unleashed: Avalanche	Direct-to-video	
2004	Unstoppable		
2004	Nature Unleashed: Fire	Direct-to-video	
2004	Control	Direct-to-video	
2005	Nature Unleashed: Earthquake	Direct-to-video	
2005	Larva	Television film	
2005	Loverboy		
2005	Raging Sharks	Direct-to-video	
2005	Mosquito-Man	Television film	
2005	SnakeMan	Television film	
2005	Bloodsuckers	Television film	
2005	Submerged	Direct-to-video	
2005	Target of Opportunity		
2005	The Chumscrubber		
2005	Before It Had a Name		
2005	Mozart and the Whale		
2005	Today You Die	Direct-to-video	
2005	Edison		
2005	The Tenants		
2005	The Cutter	Direct-to-video	
2005	Days of Love (Yamim Shel Ahava)		
2006	16 Blocks		
2006	End Game		
2006	Undisputed II: Last Man Standing	Direct-to-video	
2006	Mercenary for Justice	Direct-to-video	
2006	Journey to the End of the Night		
2006	Relative Strangers		
2006	The Black Hole	Television film	
2006	Lightspeed	Direct-to-video	
2006	The Wicker Man		
2006	The Black Dahlia		
2006	Kraken: Tentacles of the Deep	Television film	
2006	The Contract		
2006	Lonely Hearts		
2006	Wicked Little Things		
2006	Home of the Brave		
2006	The Inquiry		
2007	Gryphon	Television film	
2007	88 Minutes		
2007	Until Death		
2007	Cleaner		
2007	When Nietzsche Wept		
2007	Children of Wax		
2007	Finding Rin Tin Tin		
2007	Mega Snake	Television film	
2007	The Death and Life of Bobby Z		
2007	King of California		
2007	Headless Horseman	Television film	
2007	Showdown at Area 51	Television film	
2007	Blonde Ambition		
2008	Mad Money		
2008	Rambo		
2008	Day of the Dead		
2008	Hero Wanted		
2008	My Mom's New Boyfriend		
2008	War, Inc.		
2008	Ghouls	Television film	
2008	Shark in Venice		
2008	Flu Bird Horror	Television film	
2008	Righteous Kill		
2008	Cyborg Soldier		
2008	Kill Switch	Direct-to-video	
2008	Private Valentine: Blonde & Dangerous		
2008	Train		
2008	The Prince & Me 3: A Royal Honeymoon	Direct-to-video	
2008	Witches: The Dunwich Horror	Television film	
2009	Thick as Thieves		
2009	The Way of War		
2009	Vampire in Vegas		
2009	Direct Contact		
2009	It's Alive		
2009	Cyborg Conquest		
2009	Labor Pains		
2009	Streets of Blood	Direct-to-video	
2009	Solitary Man		
2009	Leaves of Grass		
2009	Lies & Illusions		
2009	Wolvesbayne	Television film	
2009	Ninja		
2009	Command Performance		
2009	Double Identity		
2009	Bad Lieutenant: Port of Call New Orleans		
2009	Memories of Anne Frank		
2010	Brooklyn's Finest		
2010	House of Bones		
2010	Hesher		
2010	The Prince & Me: The Elephant Adventure	Direct-to-video	
2010	Quantum Apocalypse	Television film	
2010	As Good As Dead		
2010	Undisputed III: Redemption		
2010	The Expendables		
2010	Stone		
2010	Trust		
2011	The Son of No One		
2011	The Mechanic		
2011	Drive Angry		
2011	Elephant White		
2011	Blitz		
2011	Conan the Barbarian		
2011	Trespass		
2012	The Expendables 2		
2012	The Iceman		
2012	Stolen		
2012	The Paperboy		
2012	Playing for Keeps		
2013	Texas Chainsaw 3D		
2013	Straight A's		
2013	Lovelace		
2013	Spiders 3D		
2013	Olympus Has Fallen		
2013	Killing Season		
2013	The Big Wedding		
2013	As I Lay Dying		
2013	Homefront		
2013	Ninja: Shadow of a Tear		
2014	The Legend of Hercules		
2014	The Expendables 3		
2014	The Humbling		
2014	Before I Go to Sleep		
2014	Autómata		
2014	Good People		
2014	The Taking of Deborah Logan		
2014	Stonehearst Asylum		
2015	Body of Deceit		
2015	88		
2015	Frankenstein		
2015	Survivor		
2015	Intruders		
2016	London Has Fallen		
2016	Criminal		
2016	Mechanic: Resurrection		
2016	Chuck		
2016	The Late Bloomer		
2017	The Institute		
2017	Security		
2017	Boyka: Undisputed		
2017	The Hitman's Bodyguard		
2017	Leatherface		
2017	Loving Pablo		
2017	Acts of Vengeance		
2017	Khali the Killer		
2017	Day of the Dead: Bloodline		
2018	Hunter Killer		
2019	Hellboy		
2019	The Poison Rose		
2019	Angel Has Fallen		
2019	Rambo: Last Blood		
2019	Kill Chain		
2019	The Dare		
2020	The Outpost		
2020	Tesla		
2020	Blackbird		
2021	Hitman's Wife's Bodyguard		
2021	Till Death		
2021	Jolt		
2021	The Protégé		
2023	The Offering		
2023	Expend4bles		
2024	The Bricklayer		
2024	Wanted Man		
2024	Hellboy: The Crooked Man		
2024	Dirty Angels		
2025	Red Sonja		
2027	John Rambo		
TBA	Night Has Fallen		
