= Boaz Davidson =

Israeli director & producer (born 1943)

- בועז דוידזון
- Born: November 8, 1943 (age 82)
- Education: London Film School
- Occupations: Director; producer; writer

Boaz Davidson (Hebrew: בועז דוידזון, pronounced [boˈaz ˈdavidson]; born 8 November 1943) is an Israeli film director, producer and screenwriter. He was born,and studied film in London at London Film School.

== Biography ==
Davidson was born in Europe to a Jewish family. He started his career by directing the television show Lool (1969) and the music documentary Shablul (1970). Later he directed Israeli cult films such as Fifty-Fifty (1971) Charlie Ve'hetzi (1974) and Hagiga B'Snuker (1975). In 1974 he directed the film Mishpahat Tzan'ani. He directed the first four films in the Eskimo Limon series (Eskimo Limon (1978), Going Steady (1979), Shifshuf Naim (1981), Sapiches (1982). Eskimo Limon was entered into the 28th Berlin International Film Festival in 1978. In 1986 he directed the cult film Alex Holeh Ahavah.

In 1979 Davidson moved from Israel to the United States and started working as a director, directing a remake of Eskimo Limon, The Last American Virgin in 1982.

Davidson continued to work in the United States as a producer and a screenwriter. He was involved in producing several major films including 16 Blocks, The Wicker Man, The Black Dahlia, 2008's Rambo and The Expendables. He is also listed as a producer in the thriller Trespass.

== Filmography ==
Year	Title	Credited as			Notes
Year	Title	Director	Writer	Producer	Notes
1971	Fifty-Fifty	Yes	Yes	No	
1972	Azit Hakalba Hatzanhanit	Yes	Yes	No	
1974	Charlie Ve'hetzi	Yes	No	No	
1975	La nottata	Yes	No	No	Co-directed with Tonino Cervi
1975	Hagiga B'Snuker	Yes	No	No	
1976	Mishpahat Tzan'ani	Yes	No	No	
1976	Lupo B'New York	Yes	Yes	No	
1978	Lemon Popsicle	Yes	Yes	No	
1978	It's a Funny, Funny World	No	Yes	No	
1979	Going Steady	Yes	Yes	No	
1980	Seed of Innocence	Yes	Yes	No	
1981	Hot Bubblegum	Yes	Yes	No	
1981	Hospital Massacre	Yes	story	No	
1982	The Last American Virgin	Yes	Yes	No	
1982	Private Popsicle	Yes	Yes	No	
1983	Private Manoeuvres	No	Yes	No	
1983	Baby Love	No	Yes	No	
1985	Hot Resort	No	Yes	No	
1986	Alex Holeh Ahavah	Yes	Yes	No	
1987	Dutch Treat	Yes	No	No	
1987	Going Bananas	Yes	No	No	
1988	Salsa	Yes	Yes	No	
1989	Crazy Camera	Yes	Yes	Yes	Co-directed with Tzvi Shissel
1991	Delta Force 3: The Killing Game	No	Yes	Yes	
1993	American Cyborg: Steel Warrior	Yes	story	No	
1994	Blood Run	Yes	story	No	
1995	Lunarcop	Yes	No	No	
1996	Orion's Key	No	story	No	
1997	Looking for Lola	Yes	story	Yes	
2000	Spiders	No	story	Yes	
2000	Crocodile	No	story	Yes	
2000	Octopus	No	story	Yes	
2001	Spiders II: Breeding Ground	No	story	Yes	
2001	U.S. Seals II	No	story	Yes	
2002	Octopus 2: River of Fear	No	story	Yes	
2002	Panic	No	story	Yes	
2002	Crocodile 2: Death Swamp	No	story	Yes	
2002	Derailed	No	story	Yes	
2003	Killer Rats	No	story	Yes	
2003	Cult of Fury	No	story	Yes	
2003	Alien Hunter	No	story	Yes	
2003	Air Strike	No	story	Yes	
2004	Alien Lockdown	No	story	Yes	
2005	Larva	No	story	Yes	
2005	Mansquito	No	story	Yes	
2005	Snakeman	No	story	Yes	
2005	Hammerhead: Shark Frenzy	No	story	Yes	
2006	Undisputed 2: Last Man Standing	No	story	Yes	
2006	The Black Hole	No	story	Yes	
2006	Wicked Little Things	No	story	Yes	
2007	Gryphon	No	Yes	No	
2007	Mega Snake	No	story	Yes	
2009	Ninja	No	Yes	Yes	
2010	The Prince & Me: The Elephant Adventure	No	story	No	
2010	Bunraku	No	story	No	
2016	Boyka: Undisputed	No	story	Yes	

Executive producer

- The Last Days of Frankie the Fly (1996)
- Dog Watch (1997)
- American Perfekt (1997)
- Santa Fe (1997)
- No Code of Conduct (1998)
- October 22 (1998) (co-executive)
- Outside Ozona (1998)
- Guinevere (1999)
- The Big Brass Ring (1999)
- Ticker (2001)
- Edges of the Lord (2001)
- Diary of a Sex Addict (2001)
- The Order (2001)
- Hard Cash (2002)
- All I Want (2002)
- Den of Lions (2003)
- In Hell (2003)
- Out for a Kill (2003)
- Blind Horizon (2003)
- Skeleton Man (2004)
- Shadow of Fear (2004)
- Control (2004)
- Raging Sharks (2005)
- Submerged (2005)
- Today You Die (2005)
- The Mechanik (2005)
- The Cutter (2005)
- 16 Blocks (2006)
- End Game (2006)
- Mercenary for Justice (2006)
- Journey to the End of the Night (2006)
- Relative Strangers (2006)
- The Black Dahlia (2006)
- The Contract (2006)
- Home of the Brave (2006)
- King of California (2007)
- Gryphon (2007)
- 88 Minutes (2007)
- Until Death (2007)
- Bobby Z (2007)
- When Nietzsche Wept (2007)
- Finding Rin Tin Tin (2007)
- Showdown at Area 51 (2007)
- Blonde Ambition (2007)
- Mad Money (2008)
- Rambo (2008)
- Hero Wanted (2008)
- War, Inc. (2008)
- Righteous Kill (2008)
- Shark in Venice (2008)
- My Mom's New Boyfriend (2008)
- The Prince & Me: A Royal Honeymoon (2008)
- Thick as Thieves (2009)
- Brooklyn's Finest (2009)
- Direct Contact (2009)
- It's Alive (2009)
- Labor Pains (2009)
- Streets of Blood (2009)
- Command Performance (2009)
- Lies & Illusions (2009)
- Bad Lieutenant: Port of Call New Orleans (2009)
- Leaves of Grass (2009)
- Solitary Man (2009)
- Double Identity (2009)
- The Prince & Me: The Elephant Adventure (2010)
- The Expendables (2010)
- Cool Dog (2010)
- Trust (2010)
- The Mechanic (2011)
- The Son of No One (2011)
- Drive Angry (2011)
- Elephant White (2011)
- Trespass (2011)
- The Paperboy (2012)
- The Expendables 2 (2012)
- The Iceman (2012)
- Playing for Keeps (2012)
- Straight A's (2013)
- Lovelace (2013)
- Spiders 3D (2013)
- Olympus Has Fallen (2013)
- As I Lay Dying (2013)
- Killing Season (2013)
- Homefront (2013)
- The Expendables 3 (2014)
- Before I Go to Sleep (2014)
- Survivor (2015)
- Septembers of Shiraz (2015)
- London Has Fallen (2016)
- Criminal (2016)
- Mechanic: Resurrection (2016)
- The Hitman's Bodyguard (2017)
- Leatherface (2017)
- Bigfoot (2017)
- Bullet Head (2017)
- Hunter Killer (2018)
- 211 (2018)
- Angel Has Fallen (2019)
- Blackbird (2019)
- Rambo: Last Blood (2019)
- Kill Chain (2019)
- The Outpost (2020)
- Hitman's Wife's Bodyguard (2021)
- Till Death (2021)
- Jolt (2021)
- The Protégé (2021)
- Abyzou (TBA)
- The Enforcer (TBA)
- Expend4bles (2023)

Producer only

- Licking the Raspberry (1992)
- Tipat Mazal (1992)
- Hard Justice (1995)
- Shadrach (1998)
- Some Girl (1998)
- Cold Harvest (1999)
- Bridge of Dragons (1999)
- The 4th Floor (1999)
- For the Cause (2000)
- Nobody's Baby (2001)
- Cold Heart (2001)
- Forever Lulu (2001)
- Shark Attack 3: Megalodon (2002)
- Marines (2003)
- Special Forces (2003)
- Submarines (2003)
- Air Marshal (2003)
- Shark Zone (2003)
- Unstoppable (2004)
- Mozart and the Whale (2005)
- Lonely Hearts (2006)
- Edison (2006)
- The Wicker Man (2006)
- Day of the Dead (2008)
- Train (2008)
- Private Valentine: Blonde & Dangerous (2008)
- Conan the Barbarian (2011)
- The Legend of Hercules (2014)
- Acts of Vengeance (2017)
- Day of the Dead: Bloodline (2017)

Co-producer

- Wild Side (1995)
- Plato's Run (1997)
- The Maker (1997)

Associate producer

- Search and Destroy (1995)
- Armstrong (1998)

2nd Unit director

- Operation Thunderbolt (1977)
- The Alternate (2000)
- Edison (2006)
- The Wicker Man (2006)
- Mad Money (2008)
- Ninja (2009)
- Conan the Barbarian (2011) (Additional)
- The Expendables 2 (2012) (Additional)

Special thanks

- According to Spencer (2001)
- Detention (2004)
- Intruders (2015)
