= Lati Grobman =

American film producer

- לטי גרובמן
- Occupation: Producer

Lati Grobman (Hebrew: לטי גרובמן) is a Hollywood film producer.

She acted as the producer and executive producer of several films, such as The Iceman (2012), Texas Chainsaw 3D (2013) and Eliza Graves (2014).

In May 2005, Grobman signed a nonexclusive three-picture production deal with producer Avi Lerner's Millennium Films company estimated between $7 million-$15 million according to Variety.

In 2011, Grobman partnered up with actress/producer Christa Campbell to form Campbell-Grobman Films, which has produced numerous films, such as Texas Chainsaw 3D (2005), The Iceman (2012), and Straight A's (2013).

In 2014, Lati's film Brave Miss World (2013), received an Emmy nomination for Exceptional Merit in Documentary Filmmaking.

Her recent projects include Criminal, starring Tommy Lee Jones, Kevin Costner and Gary Oldman.

== Campbell-Grobman Films ==
Founded by executives Christa Campbell and Lati Grobman, Campbell-Grobman Films is a film production company. In the past 18 months, they have produced seven films for multiple companies across Hollywood, including Texas Chainsaw 3D and The Iceman, starring Michael Shannon and Winona Ryder. Their films have been showcased at several film festivals, including Toronto, Venice, Montreal, and WorldFest-Houston, where their documentary film The Resort took home the Special Jury Award.

== Personal life ==
Grobman was born in Russia. She is the daughter of Israeli painter Michail Grobman and art magazine editor Irena Grobman, and sister to Israeli architect Yasha Jacob Grobman.

== Producer ==
Year	Film	Notes
2001	Prozac Nation	associate producer – as Deni Lati Grobman
2002	Hard Cash	co-producer
2002	Strike!	(short) executive producer
2003	In Hell	co-producer
2004	Shadow of Fear	co-producer
2005	The Tenants	
2005	Mozart and the Whale	co-producer
2005	Edison	associate producer
2006	Undisputed II: Last Man Standing	executive producer
2006	Relative Strangers	
2007	1906	(documentary) executive producer
2007	Cleaner	
2007	Blonde Ambition	
2008	Righteous Kill	producer
2009	Labor Pains	
2010	Undisputed III: Redemption	co-producer
2011	Killer on the Loose	(short)
2012	The Resort	(documentary)
2012	The Iceman	executive producer
2013	Texas Chainsaw 3D	executive producer
2013	Straight A's	executive producer
2013	Spiders	executive producer
2013	Reality Show	
2013	Brave Miss World	(documentary) executive producer
2013	A Case of You	executive producer
2014	Stonehearst Asylum	executive producer
2014	She's Funny That Way	executive producer
2014	The Taking of Deborah Logan	executive producer
2015	Experimenter	executive producer
2015	Intruders	producer
2016	Chuck	Producer
2016	Criminal	Producer
2017	The Institute	producer
2017	The Hitman's Bodyguard	executive producer
2017	Leatherface	producer
2017	Loving Pablo	executive producer
2017	Day of the Dead: Bloodline	producer
2018	Hunter Killer	executive producer
2019	Hellboy	executive producer
2019	Angel Has Fallen	executive producer
2019	Rambo: Last Blood	executive producer
2020	Tesla	producer
2021	Jolt	executive producer
