= Grobman =

Grobman (Hebrew: גרובמן) is a surname. Notable people with the surname include:

- Alex Grobman, American historian
- Arnold B. Grobman (1918–2012), American zoologist
- Lati Grobman, Russian-born American film producer, daughter of Michail
- Michail Grobman (1939–2025), Russian-born Israeli poet and painter

== See also ==
- Hartman–Grobman theorem, a theorem in mathematical analysis
- Campbell Grobman Films, an American film and television production company
