= Day of the Dead: Bloodline =

2017 action horror film

- Theatrical release poster
- Directed by: Hèctor Hernández Vicens
- Written by: Mark Tonderai; Lars Jacobson
- Based on: Day of the Dead by George A. Romero
- Produced by: Yariv Lerner; Boaz Davidson; Jeff Rice; Lati Grobman; Christa Campbell; James Dudelson
- Starring: Johnathon Schaech; Sophie Skelton; Marcus Vanco; Jeff Gum
- Cinematography: Anton Ognianov
- Edited by: Damian Drago
- Music by: Frederik Wiedmann
- Production companies: Millennium Media; Taurus Entertainment Company; Campbell Grobman Films, LLC; Jeff Rice Films
- Distributed by: Saban Films; Lionsgate Home Entertainment
- Release dates: December 29, 2017 (Vietnam); January 5, 2018 (United States)
- Running time: 90 minutes
- Countries: United States; Bulgaria
- Language: English
- Budget: $8 million
- Box office: $277,922

Day of the Dead: Bloodline is a 2017 action horror film serving as one of two remakes of George A. Romero's original 1985 film Day of the Dead: the first, also titled Day of the Dead, was released in 2008. Like its source material, the "reimagining" takes place during a zombie outbreak, and follows survivors in an emergency bunker as they attempt to find a cure for the zombie virus. Directed by Hèctor Hernández Vicens, the film includes an ensemble cast featuring Johnathon Schaech, Sophie Skelton, Marcus Vanco, and Jeff Gum.

Day of the Dead: Bloodline was released on December 29, 2017, in Vietnam and on January 5, 2018, in the United States. The film received negative reviews from critics, who considered it inferior to the original film.

== Plot ==
Medical student Zoe Parker reluctantly attends a party at her medical school at the behest of her friends. While retrieving a keg of beer from the morgue, Zoe is confronted by her disturbed patient Max, who is obsessively in love with her and whose blood has an unusually high level of antibodies. He attacks and attempts to rape her, but a corpse reanimates and bites into Max's shoulder. Zoe flees and warns everyone at the party, but hordes of the corpses, later dubbed rotters, burst in and kill all except Zoe, who escapes through a window, only to find the city besieged by rotters.

The survivors of the initial outbreak are sent to refugee camps. Zoe is sent to High Rock Emergency Bunker, run by Lieutenant Miguel Salazar.

Five years later, High Rock Emergency Bunker has lost contact with the other camps and with headquarters. Although Miguel believes a cure is impossible, Zoe and her friend Elyse serve as camp doctors, treating illnesses and using rotter blood samples to create a cure for the rotters.

At Zoe's urging, Miguel sends Zoe, Elyse, his brother (Zoe's boyfriend) Baca, Frank, Lucy, Derek, and Thomas on a supply run to retrieve medication from Whittendale University for Lily, a little girl suffering bacterial pneumonia. While taking medication from a professor's office, Zoe encounters Max, now partially a rotter. Horrified, Zoe flees and accidentally attracts the attention of other rotters. The group saves her, but Frank is killed when the rotters overwhelm him. Zoe successfully administers the medicine to Lily; however Max has managed to enter the camp.

Due to Frank's death, animosity between Zoe and Miguel increases. While walking on her own, Zoe is attacked by Max, but signals for help and is rescued by Miguel, Baca, Thomas, Lucy, and Derek. Realizing that Max is not fully a rotter, Zoe convinces Miguel to allow her to use Max's blood to create a vaccine, and Miguel gives her 48 hours to create it, having been convinced by Frank's wife, Elle.

Zoe and Elyse realize they need to test Max's blood on blood samples from live rotters. She convinces Baca to help her by opening the gates to allow one rotter in and take a blood sample from it. Although this initially goes well, rotters burst through the gates, kill Thomas, and infect Elyse. Miguel kills several rotters and seals the doors to the compound, and, ignoring Zoe's pleas that she can use the vaccine on her, kills Elyse.

Miguel tells Baca that he saw Zoe's name carved into Max's arm earlier. When Baca confronts Zoe about this, she tells him about Max's rape attempt. Max steals the keys to his handcuffs from Alphonse during a scuffle. Max begins to taunt Zoe, telling her repeatedly, “You are mine,” before freeing himself and attempting to rape her again. However, Zoe manages to escape. Lily's mother, whom Max had previously infected, chases after Lily and kills Derek. Max kills her and chases Lily to the motorpool.

The remaining military personnel arrive, but Max opens the doors and allows a horde of rotters inside, which kill Elle and Lucy among several others. In the ensuing chaos, Lily flees outside, and Zoe chases after her with Max in pursuit. Baca attempts to go after them, but Miguel stops and threatens to shoot him at gunpoint. Both are then bitten by the rotters, and Miguel is ultimately killed while Baca manages to escape.

Max follows them into a greenhouse, where Zoe, hidden in mud, disembowels and decapitates him. Zoe and Lily walk back into the compound, where she finds Baca about to commit suicide to prevent reanimation. Zoe convinces Baca she can cure him with the vaccine and injects him with it, curing him as a result. Sometime later, High Rock Emergency Bunker has been repaired, and Zoe sends a message to any remaining survivors that they have the vaccine, while the rotters’ growls are heard from within a nearby forest.

== Cast ==
- Johnathon Schaech as Max
- Sophie Skelton as Zoe Parker
- Jeff Gum as Lieutenant Miguel Salazar
- Marcus Vanco as Baca Salazar
- Mark Smith as Alphonse
- Nick Loeb as Derek
- Cristina Serafini as Elle
- Lillian Blankenship as Lily
- Shari Watson as Elyse
- Atanas Srebrev as Frank
- Ulyana Chan as Lucy
- Nathan Cooper as Savin
- Vladimir Mihailov as Thomas
- Bashar Rahal as Daniels
- Teodora Duhovnikova as Wendy
- Phyllis Spielman as Claire
- Rachel O’Meara as Dr. Beeman
- Lorina Kamburova as Abby
- Debbie Sherman as Linda

== Production ==
On July 10, 2013, it was announced that there would be a second remake of Day of the Dead, titled Day of the Dead: Bloodline. Christa Campbell and Lati Grobman, two of the producers behind Texas Chainsaw 3D, had obtained the rights. Campbell, who had a small role in the first remake said, "We want to keep it as close to the Romero version as possible. To make sure that his fans are happy. These are not going to be zombies climbing walls and doing back flips like in World War Z."

Campbell and Grobman held meetings with possible writers to figure out the best way to adapt the story. It began filming in June 2016.

== Release ==
Day of the Dead: Bloodline first released in Vietnam, on December 12, 2017. It later released in the United States via home media, by Saban Films and Lionsgate Home Entertainment, on January 5, 2018.

== Reception ==
The film was panned by critics and received overwhelmingly negative reviews. On the review aggregator website Rotten Tomatoes, the film holds an approval rating of 11% based on nine reviews, and an average rating of 3/10.

Michael Gingold of Rue Morgue called the idea of a remake "a foolish and pointless exercise" and said the film's themes were "strictly and tediously standard-issue." Brian Tallerico on Rogerebert.com gave the film a star-and-a-half, stating there were a few well-choreographed action scenes, but "I was just watching people I didn’t care about yell at each other and make really stupid decisions."
