= Mansquito =

2005 American made-for-television monster film

- Mansquito DVD cover (as "Mosquito-Man")
- Written by: Kenneth M. Badish; Ray Cannella; Boaz Davidson; Michael Hurst
- Directed by: Tibor Takács
- Starring: Corin Nemec; Musetta Vander; Matt Jordon
- Theme music composer: Joseph Conlan; Sophia Morizet
- Country of origin: United States
- Original language: English

Production
- Producers: Kenneth M. Badish; David Varod; Boaz Davidson
- Cinematography: Emil Topuzov
- Editor: Ellen Fine
- Running time: 95 minutes
- Production companies: Nu Image Films; Equity Pictures Medienfonds GmbH & Co. KG II; Active Entertainment
- Budget: $5,000,000 (estimated)

Original release
- Network: Syfy
- Release: March 5, 2005

Mansquito (also known as Mosquito-Man) is a 2005 American made-for-television monster movie directed by Tibor Takács, and stars Corin Nemec, Musetta Vander and Matt Jordon. It shares many similarities with the 1986 adaptation of The Fly, and was conceived by Ray Cannella, Manager of Program Acquisition for the Syfy Channel. He and other two colleagues began producing films for the channel feeling that they could do better than the films they bought from independent producers.

== Plot ==
Dr. Jennifer Allen in Baltimore, Maryland wants to find a cure for a disease known as the Gillen virus, capturing infected mosquitoes and giving them small doses of radiation. A convict named Ray Erikson joins Dr. Allen's program in exchange for his lifelong prison sentence. He takes a hostage and convinces Dr. Allen to open the door to the experiment room. The security guards open fire and cause an explosion that showers Ray and Dr. Allen with the chemicals and the genetically altered mosquitoes. He begins to transform into the titular monster, but manages to find his way to his ex-girlfriend's apartment, where the process continues, and he kills her after his transformation is complete.

Meanwhile, Dr. Allen returns home with her boyfriend, Baltimore Police Lieutenant Tom Randall, showing similar symptoms. Tom is called to investigate another crime scene, where he encounters Mansquito. The monster seems unstoppable, until Tom shocks him with a stun gun, making him flee in pain. After being spared by Mansquito, Dr. Allen believes the monster sensed that she is turning into a creature like him and that once the transformation is complete, he will want to mate with her.

Meanwhile, back at the lab, Dr. Allen undergoes yet another transformation and releases the last batch of genetically altered mosquitoes, which have been perfected. The monster arrives and Tom fights him to no avail. Dr. Allen is seriously injured by Mansquito, who is now focused on killing her rather than mating with her. Tom uses the stun gun and once again, it works. Seeing this, Dr. Allen breaks an electrical line and electrocutes Mansquito, sacrificing herself. Tom writes a report about the incident and the Gillen virus is wiped out by the altered mosquitoes.

== Cast ==
- Corin Nemec as Lieutenant Thomas Randall
- Musetta Vander as Dr. Jennifer Allen
- Matt Jordon as Ray Erikson / Mansquito
- Patrick Dreikauss as Detective Charlie Morrison
- Jay Benedict as Dr. Aaron Michaels
- Christa Campbell as Liz

== Release ==
=== Home media ===
The film was released on DVD by Millennium on May 17, 2005.

== Reception ==
Dread Central awarded the film a score of 3 out of 5. Noting the film's shortcomings and rudimentary plot but complimented the film's creature design, and gore effects, stating "Mansquito is a fun throwback to the b-movies of yore that’s more entertaining than it has any right to be. Perhaps it was just dumb luck or maybe the law of averages finally caught up with them but the Sci-Fi Channel finally produced a winner." Chris Carle from IGN gave the film a negative review, calling it "a lurching mess of silly logic, odd casting, bad CG and 1960's Japan-quality monster suit effects." HorrorNews.net while noting the film's faults, the reviewer felt that the makers did a decent enough job with the film to make it enjoyable. Felix Vasquez from Cinema Crazed gave the film a mostly positive review, writing, "This is another one of those so bad they’re good films with a really ridiculous concept, but overall you can’t help but like it a lot. With some great special effects, good gore, hilarious moments, and bad acting, you can’t take this too seriously. Enter with an open mind and you’ll enjoy it, like I did." David Cornelius from eFilmCritic awarded the film 2/5 stars, writing, "It pains me to say that none of this is nearly as fun as it should have been. Any movie with a plot this insane must, by all accounts, be either outrageously stupid or deliciously, self-consciously entertaining. Mansquito is neither. Aside from a few moments of uncontrollable idiocy (mostly involving the grand miscasting of nice guy Nemic as badass cop), there's very little here that manages to do anything other than bore."

== See also ==
- Skeleton Man, a 2004 Sci Fi original film
- Snakeman, a 2005 Sci Fi original film
- Sharkman, a 2005 Sci Fi original film
