= Christa Campbell =

American actress

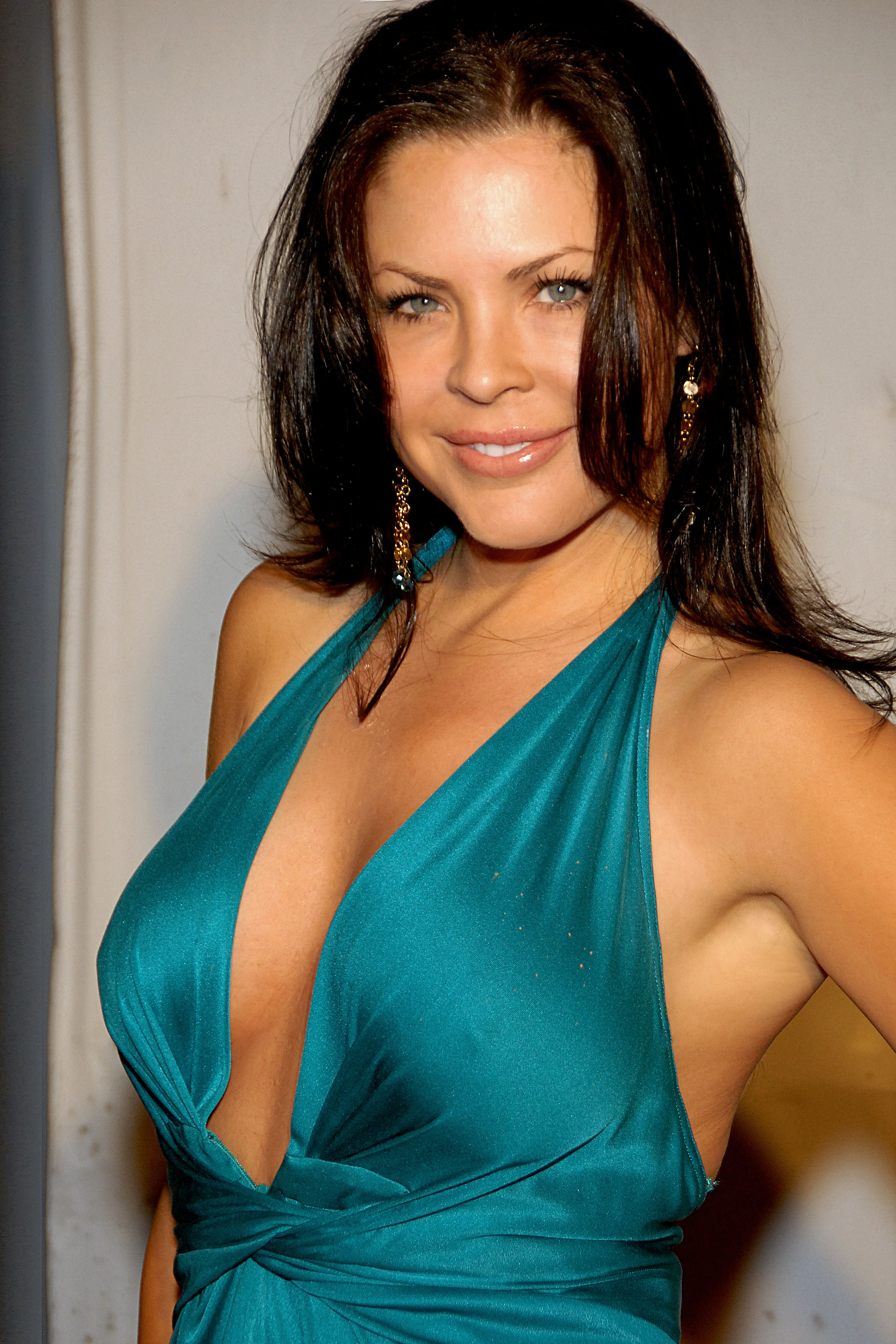
- Campbell attending Maxim Magazine's 10th Annual Hot 100 Celebration, Santa Monica, CA on May 13, 2009
- Occupations: Actress, film producer
- Years active: 1994–present

Christa Campbell is an American actress and producer. She is best known for her roles in 2001 Maniacs, Mozart and the Whale, Lonely Hearts, The Wicker Man, Cleaner, Day of the Dead, Lies & Illusions, The Mechanic, Drive Angry, Straight A's, The Big Wedding, and The Iceman.

In 2011, Campbell partnered up with producer Lati Grobman to form Campbell-Grobman Films, which has produced numerous films such as Texas Chainsaw 3D, Straight A's, and The Iceman.

== Campbell-Grobman Films ==
Founded by executives Campbell and Lati Grobman, Campbell-Grobman Films has produced seven films, including Texas Chainsaw 3D and The Iceman, starring Michael Shannon and Winona Ryder. Campbell and Grobman work within various genres, including horror, romantic comedy, action, and documentary.

== Filmography ==
=== Movies ===
Year	Film	Role	Notes
2000	Desire L.A.	Melissa	Short
2000	Red Letters	Lauren	
2000	The Crew	Nurse	
2001	Looking for Bobby D	Sandy	Short
2001	Spring Break Lawyer	Fantasy Sequence Defendant	TV movie
2002	The New Guy	Tommy Lee's Girlfriend	(uncredited)
2003	Malibu's Most Wanted	Angry Feminist	
2004	The Drone Virus	Seductress	
2005	Mansquito	Liz	TV movie
2005	2001 Maniacs	Milk Maiden	
2005	Mozart and the Whale	Therapist	
2005	Death by Engagement	Stacy	
2006	End Game	Mistress	
2006	Lonely Hearts	Sara Long	
2006	Relative Strangers	Carnival Girl	
2006	The Black Hole	Advisor Coldwell	TV movie
2006	The Wicker Man	Truck Stop Waitress	
2006	Kraken: Tentacles of the Deep	Emily Reiter	TV movie
2007	Blizhniy Boy: The Ultimate Fighter	Anastasia	
2007	Cleaner	Coach Beth Jensen	
2007	Revamped	Lexa	Video
2007	Hallows Point	Tanya Graves	
2007	Showdown at Area 51	Charlie Weise	
2007	Blonde Ambition	Female Office Worker #1	
2008	Hero Wanted	Kayla McQueen	
2008	Day of the Dead	Mrs. Leitner	
2008	Audie & the Wolf	Rachel Brock	
2009	Guardian	Janet	
2009	Finding Bliss	Kato	
2009	Labor Pains	Brunette	
2009	Lies & Illusions	Nicole Williams	
2009	The Tomb	Mrs. Burris	
2010	2001 Maniacs: Field of Screams	Milk Maiden	
2010	Blood: A Butcher's Tale	Lily	
2010	Gun	News Reporter	
2010	Cool Dog	Laura Warner	Video
2011	The Mechanic	Kelly	
2011	Drive Angry	Mona Elkins	
2011	Hyenas	Wilda	
2011	Spoon	Woman	Short
2013	Straight A's	Dana	
2013	Spiders	Rachel Cole	
2013	The Iceman	Adele	
2013	The Big Wedding	Kim	
2013	Homefront	Lydia	
2014	Autómata	Tech #2	
2014	Blood Valley: Seed's Revenge	Olivia	
2014	Everyone Wants the Kush	Diana (rumored)	Pre-production
TBA	2001 Maniacs 3	Milk Maiden	

=== Television ===
Year	Title	Role	Notes
1996	Pacific Blue	Terry	1 episode “First Shoot”
1997	All That	Sara	1 episode “Mary J. Blige”
1999	Unhappily Ever After	Kirsten	1 episode “Date to Win”
2002	Sabrina, the Teenage Witch	Tina	1 episode “Sabrina Unplugged”
2004	Summerland	Fashion Model	1 episode “Pilot”
2007	Family Guy	Blonde / Elisabeth Shue	1 episode “Movin’ Out (Brian’s Song)
2012	Leverage	Teresa Darnell	1 episode “The Rundown Job”

=== Producer ===
Year	Film	Notes	Ref.
2011	Killer on the Loose	short (executive producer)	
2012	The Resort	documentary (executive producer)	
2013	Texas Chainsaw 3D	executive producer	
2013	Straight A's	executive producer	
2013	Reality Show		
2013	Brave Miss World	documentary (executive producer)	
2013	A Case of You	executive producer	
2014	Stonehearst Asylum	executive producer	
2014	She's Funny That Way	executive producer	
2016	Criminal	Producer	
2016	Chuck	Producer	
2017	Leatherface	Producer	
2017	Day of the Dead: Bloodline	Producer	
2019	Hellboy	Executive producer	
2019	Angel Has Fallen	Executive producer	
2019	Rambo: Last Blood	executive producer	
2020	Tesla	Producer	
2021	Jolt	Executive producer	

=== Shows ===
Year	Title	Role	Notes
1997	Halloween...The Happy Haunting of America!	Herself	documentary
1998	E! True Hollywood Story	Young Bettie Page	TV series documentary
2000	The X Show	Host	2 episodes
2000	Thunderbox	Herself – Host	1 episode
2002	The Jamie Kennedy Experiment	Jamie’s Girlfriend	Episode # 1.3
2004	Lingerie Bowl	Herself – Team Dream #8	1 episode
2006	Inside the Asylum: The Making of ‘2001 Maniacs’	Herself	video documentary short
2006	Tom Green’s House Tonight	Herself	Episode #1.29
2006	Going to Pieces: The Rise and Fall of the Slasher Movie	Herself	documentary
2007	Heckler	Herself	documentary
2009	Welcome to My Darkside	Herself	documentary
2009	Denise Richards: It’s Complicated	Herself	Denise Does Slamdance (2009)
2010	2001 Maniacs: Behind the Screams	Herself	video documentary short
2010	Emily Booth’s GoreZone Magazine Movie Massacre	Herself	Film Festival (2010)
2011	Vicious Circle	Herself	4 episodes
