= Matt Rippy =

American actor (born 1968)

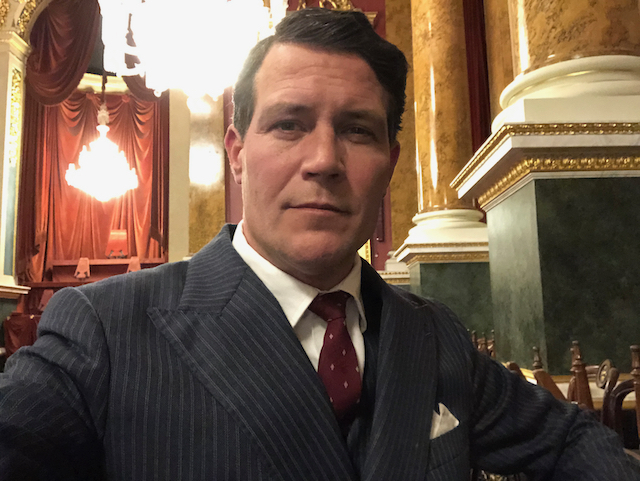
- Rippy on location in London, April 2021.
- Born: Matthew Damon Rippy; January 26, 1968 (age 58); St. Louis, Missouri, U.S.
- Other name: Rip
- Education: High School for the Performing and Visual Arts
- Occupation: Actor
- Years active: 1990–present
- Website: www.mattrippy.com

Matt Rippy (born January 26, 1968) is an American actor who is most known for the recent Netflix series Glória, his role as the 'real' Captain Jack Harkness in Torchwood in 2007 and his comic stage performances with the Reduced Shakespeare Company.

== Early life and education ==
Rippy was born in St. Louis, Missouri and raised in Houston, Texas. He began acting at an early age putting on performances in the family living room for family and friends which led to his first public performance at The Country Playhouse at the age of 12. He attended the drama department at Houston's prestigious High School for the Performing and Visual Arts (HSPVA) and was a member of the Alley Theatre repertory company for three seasons.

== Career ==
In 1994, Rippy moved to England where he joined the Reduced Shakespeare Company for a record breaking run in London's West End, performing The Complete Works of William Shakespeare (abridged), The Complete History of America (abridged) and The Bible: The Complete Word of God (abridged). In 2002 he was a Helen Hayes Award nominee for Outstanding Lead Actor for his role in The Complete Works of William Shakespeare (abridged) at The Kennedy Center in Washington, D.C. He toured with the company on numerous occasions around the United States, UK, Europe, the Middle East and Asia. Rippy would continue off and on to perform, direct and help develop new plays with the Reduced Shakespeare Company for the next twenty years.

Rippy launched his TV and film career in 1995 with a guest appearance on Goodnight Sweetheart with Nicholas Lyndhurst for the BBC. He has worked extensively in UK television, including appearances in Cracker, Jonathan Creek, Ultimate Force, Doctors, Holby City, Secret Diary of a Call Girl and The Crown. In a 2007 television appearance, Rippy portrayed the namesake of Jack Harkness of Torchwood in the first series' twelfth episode, "Captain Jack Harkness". In this critically acclaimed episode, Captain Jack (Rippy) was a young American volunteer serving as an RAF Group Captain stationed in Cardiff. He was in a heterosexual relationship, and was eventually revealed to be attracted to Torchwood's Jack, who after an unfortunate "temporal shift", landed in 1941 during the height of the Cardiff blitz. The episode was the favorite selected by fans for the 2020 Radio Times Watch-along simulcast.

He also appears in the films Day of the Dead, Boogeyman 3, Beyond the Sea, The Monuments Men and Black Beauty. Rippy starred in the cult B-movie Roboshark released on the SyFy Channel in 2015. SciFi & Scary gave the film 5/5: "Overall, Roboshark was a delight to watch and to interact with, because, yes, folks, Roboshark will follow you on Twitter." In 2016, he appeared in Rogue One: A Star Wars Story as Corporal Rostok. Almost all of his scenes were cut from the film, however there is a Lego mini-figure of his character.

Rippy is most recently seen as CIA agent James Wilson in the Netflix series Glória.

== Filmography ==
Year	Title	Role	Notes
2001	Beginner's Luck	Richard	
2004	Beyond the Sea	David Gershenson	
2006	Nuremberg, Goering's Last Stand	Lt. Jack 'Tex' Wheelis	
2006	Penelope	Chauffeur	Uncredited
2008	Day of the Dead	Dr. Logan	
2008	Hellboy II: The Golden Army	Newscaster #4	
2008	The Dark Knight	First Mate	
2009	Nativity!	Harrison	
2014	Jack Ryan: Shadow Recruit	FBI Lead Agent Simmons – Dearborn	
2014	The Monuments Men	Colonel Gregg	
2016	Eddie the Eagle	US Anchorman	
2016	Rogue One	Corporal Rostok	
2017	American Assassin	USS Flynn Captain	
2020	Black Beauty	Henry Gordon	
