= Tibor Takács (director) =

Hungarian-Canadian film director

- Born: September 11, 1954 (age 71); Budapest, Hungary
- Occupations: Film director, producer, writer
- Years active: 1978–present

Tibor Takács (born September 11, 1954) is a Hungarian-Canadian director, noted for directing The Gate (1987) and its sequel, The Gate II: Trespassers (1990). His career has largely been associated with horror movies, though he has also directed many Christmas-themed films, often for the Hallmark Channel. He also directed the TV movie Sabrina the Teenage Witch which became the basis for the TV series of the same name.

== Early life ==
Takács was born on September 11, 1954, in Budapest, Hungary, but grew up in Canada. He described his early experiences with cinema as being the result of his "European parents who watched a lot of foreign films with subtitles." Around the age of ten, his family moved to a more urban area with several movie theaters, where he began to see multiple American films a week for several years. He attended the University of Toronto, where he began to work in theater and directed several award-winning short films, which eventually led to commercial directing work.

His film career did not begin immediately, however. In the late 1970s, Takács was involved with various Toronto-area punk and metal bands. He served as manager and producer for Toronto punk bands The Viletones and The Cardboard Brains, and is credited as producer on the Viletones' Screamin Fist (1977) single, and Cardboard Brains' White EP (1977) and Black EP (1978), as well as recording engineer on the Viletones' 1977 recording sessions (eventually released in 1994 as A Taste of Honey). Takács collaborated with Canadian author and filmmaker Peter Vronsky during the 1970s and acted as a cinematographer and art director on some of his films.

In 1978, he released his first feature-length film, the independently produced sci-fi musical Metal Messiah, which featured numerous Toronto-based musicians, including members of Kickback and the Cardboard Brains. The film was written by Stephen Zoller, his partner in Mega-Media Productions, with the two then collaborating further on the 1981 theatrical feature The Tomorrow Man and the 1983 short film Snow.

Snow was a Genie Award nominee for Best Theatrical Short Film at the 5th Genie Awards in 1984.

== Film career ==
In 1987, Takács released his first studio-backed feature film, The Gate. The production originated from Takács' attempt to secure funding for a film version of the 1975 young adult novel The Girl Who Owned a City by O. T. Nelson. Producer John Kemeny passed on that idea, but offered Takács three projects, including The Wraith (which Takács declined) and The Gate. Takács later said he responded to the script because of its similarity to a fairy tale. He explained in 2017, "I really feel like fairy tales are an important part of your development, your creativity, especially when you're young. I feel like you have to experience fear when you're young because it opens up a floodgate to imagination."

The Gate was a financial success, which enabled him to secure funding for his follow-up, 1989's I, Madman, an unusual horror film which combined elements of film noir and pulp fiction (of which he was a collector).

The Gate was followed by a sequel, The Gate II: Trespassers, in 1990. It was less financially successful than its predecessor.

In the 1990s, Takács moved into television, directing episodes of Red Shoe Diaries, the 1995 revival of The Outer Limits, Police Academy (the series) and Sabrina the Teenage Witch (including the 1996 pilot movie for the latter and its 1998 sequel).

During the same decade, he continued regularly directing feature films as well as TV, including action and sci-fi films starring Lorenzo Lamas, Mark Dacascos and Rutger Hauer.

In 2000, he directed Once Upon a Christmas, following it the next year with a sequel.

In the early 2000s, he began to increasingly direct made-for-TV movies, primarily for the SyFy Channel (including Mansquito (2005), The Black Hole (2006), Ice Spiders (2007) and Mega Snake (2007)), as well as the Hallmark Channel (where he has directed multiple Christmas-themed films).

== Selected directorial filmography ==
- Metal Messiah (1978)
- The Tomorrow Man (1981)
- Snow (1983)
- The Gate (1987)
- I, Madman (1989)
- The Gate II: Trespassers (1990)
- Tropical Heat (1991) (TV series)
- Red Shoe Diaries

- "Double Dare" (1992) (TV episode)
- "Borders of Salt" (1994) (TV episode)

- Bad Blood (1994)
- The Outer Limits

- "Blood Brothers" (1995) (TV episode)
- "White Light Fever" (1995) (TV episode)
- "The Voyage Home" (1995) (TV episode)
- "I, Robot" (1995) (TV episode)
- "If These Walls Could Talk" (1995) (TV episode)

- Sabrina the Teenage Witch (1996) (Showtime original movie)
- Sabotage (1996)
- Redline (1997) aka Deathline aka Armageddon
- Earth: Final Conflict

- "Pandora's Box" (1998) (TV episode)
- "If You Could Read My Mind" (1998) (TV episode)

- Sabrina Goes to Rome (1998) (TV)
- The Crow: Stairway to Heaven

- "Through a Dark Circle" (1999) (TV episode)
- "The People vs. Eric Draven" (1999) (TV episode)

- Once Upon a Christmas (2000)
- Nostradamus (2000)
- Twice Upon a Christmas (2001)
- Tornado Warning (2002)
- Killer Rats (2003)
- Mansquito (2005)
- Nature Unleashed: Earthquake (2005)
- The Black Hole (2006)
- Kraken: Tentacles of the Deep (2006)
- Ice Spiders (2007)
- Mega Snake (2007)
- NYC: Tornado Terror (2008)
- Lies & Illusions (2009)
- Meteor Storm (2010)
- My Babysitter's a Vampire
  - "Double Negative" (2011) (TV episode)
  - "Smells like Trouble" (2011) (TV episode)
  - "Die Pod" (2011) (TV episode)
  - "The Brewed" (2012) (TV episode)
  - "Welcome Back Dusker" (2012) (TV episode)
  - "Fanged and Furious" (2012) (TV episode)
  - "Flushed" (2012) (TV episode)
  - "Hottie Ho-Tep" (2012) (TV episode)
  - "Independence Daze" (2012) (TV episode)
  - "Siren Song" (2012) (TV episode)
- Spiders 3D (2013)
- Bunks (2013)
- Destruction: Los Angeles (2017)
- Rocky Mountain Christmas (2017)
- It's Christmas Eve (2018)
- Memories of Christmas (2018)
- A Christmas Miracle (2019)
- The Secret Ingredient (2020)
- The Christmas Aunt (2020)
- Blowback (2022)
- Black Warrant (2022)
