= Intruders (2015 film) =

- Theatrical release poster
- Directed by: Adam Schindler
- Written by: T.J. Cimfel; David K. White
- Produced by: Steven Schneider; Jeff Rice; Lati Grobman; Erik Olsen
- Starring: Beth Riesgraf; Martin Starr; Jack Kesy; Rory Culkin
- Cinematography: Eric Leach
- Edited by: Adam Schindler; Brian Netto
- Music by: Frederik Wiedmann
- Production companies: Vicarious Entertainment; Room 101, Inc.; Jeff Rice Films; Campbell-Grobman Films
- Distributed by: Momentum Pictures
- Release dates: June 12, 2015 (LA Film Festival); January 15, 2016 (United States)
- Running time: 90 minutes
- Country: United States
- Language: English
- Budget: $1.6 million

Intruders (also known as Shut In and Deadly Home) is a 2015 American horror thriller film directed by Adam Schindler and written by T.J. Cimfel and David K. White. The film stars Beth Riesgraf, Martin Starr, Jack Kesy, and Rory Culkin.

== Plot ==
Anna suffers from severe agoraphobia and has not left her childhood home in the ten years since her father died. She takes care of her brother, Conrad, who is dying of pancreatic cancer, and receives daily food deliveries from Dan, with whom she is friends. Her brother tries to encourage her to move on and leave the house. After Conrad dies, Anna and Dan commiserate over how they both feel trapped in their current situations. Anna offers Dan a large sum of money as a chance to escape his circumstances but he declines.

The day of Conrad's funeral, three men (Perry, Vance, and his brother J.P.) break into Anna's house looking for the money. When they discover Anna, one of them puts her on the couch and duct tapes her ankles together but they are surprised to find she cannot leave the house, even after being untied and the door being right in front of her. Trying to draw her out of hiding, Perry kills her pet bird but she refuses to reveal the location of the money. Dan arrives, looking for Anna since she was not at her brother's funeral. The thieves restrain him and begin to search the house for the money. Anna kills Vance and drags him into the basement. The other two go to the basement and she activates a switch that retracts the staircase.

Anna confronts Dan, who admits that he told Vance about the money but never intended the robbery, but that he only confided to them about her offer and that he couldn't get her out of his head. Angry and hurt, Anna breaks two of his fingers and cuts his bonds. She pushes him into the basement and he dislocates his knee in the fall. Perry pops Dan's kneecap back into place and takes pleasure in Dan's pain.

Using a surveillance system, Anna lures J.P. into a separate bedroom and locks him in. When Perry tries to escape, she bludgeons him with a hammer. Unfazed, Perry attacks her. As Anna nears death, Perry's wound catches up to him and he dies before he can kill her. Dan attempts to escape and finds Perry dead, as well as a body in the freezer. Conrad's lawyer arrives to check on Anna. Anna acts normal but when Dan begins yelling for help and banging on the door, the lawyer hears him. Anna passes it off as an old radiator that Dan is downstairs working on. After the lawyer buys this and leaves, Anna traps Dan and J.P. in one room.

As Anna watches from the cameras, J.P. deduces the truth of their situation: Conrad was a serial killer who lured his victims into the basement and killed them while Anna watched, thus explaining the various contraptions around the house. Anna confirms this but clarifies that all of their victims were child molesters, as was Anna and Conrad's father. She recalls the story of her father's abuse and her brother killing him. She promises to release Dan if he kills J.P. and reveals a gun with a single bullet but Dan refuses. J.P. grabs the gun and Anna tries to convince him to kill himself for causing his younger brother's death. He laughs at this and points the gun at Dan. Anna, who does not want Dan to die, unlocks the door, and J.P. and Dan escape.

In a fit of rage, J.P. decides to go back in for revenge. Hoping to burn her to death, he pours gasoline around the house. He attacks Anna, trying to choke her to death with a pillowcase, and alludes to raping her after she passes out. Dan arrives when she is again near death and distracts J.P. enough for her to grab the gun from J.P.'s pants and shoot him. Dan and Anna share a long look and he leaves without a word. Anna listens to him drive away. She then stands and takes one step out the door. On her way out, she sparks the blaze, burning the house and its secrets.

== Cast ==
- Beth Riesgraf as Anna Rook
- Rory Culkin as Dan Cooper
- Jack Kesy as J.P. Henson
- Martin Starr as Perry Cuttner
- Joshua Mikel as Vance Henson
- Timothy T. McKinney as Conrad Rook
- Leticia Jimenez as Charlotte

== Production ==
On August 28, 2014, it was announced that Adam Schindler would be directing a horror thriller, Shut In, written by T.J. Cimfel and David White, which Schindler would produce along with Jeff Rice, Lati Grobman and Erik Olsen.

Filming began in late August 2014 in Shreveport, Louisiana.

== Release and reception ==
The film premiered at the LA Film Festival on June 12, 2015.

The film received mixed reviews. On review aggregator website Rotten Tomatoes, the film has an approval rating of 50% based on 24 reviews, with an average critic rating of 5.4/10. Dennis Harvey of Variety called the film "an efficiently engineered suspenser, with solid performances and a tight pace", though writing that the film's "third act is a bit of a letdown". Brian Tallerico of RogerEbert.com gave the film two out of a possible four stars, referring to it as a "promising film that leaves a bad taste in your mouth, like a meal well-presented on the plate that just doesn't fill you up".
