= Skeleton Man =

2004 American television film

- Skeleton Man DVD cover
- Written by: Frederick Bailey
- Directed by: Johnny Martin
- Starring: Michael Rooker; Casper Van Dien; Jerry Trimble; Noa Tishby; Eric Etebari
- Theme music composer: Chris White
- Country of origin: United States
- Original language: English

Production
- Producer: Charles Arthur Berg
- Cinematography: Richard Briglia
- Editors: Kenn Bartlett; Michele Gisser
- Running time: 89 minutes
- Production companies: Martini Films; Millennium Films; Two Sticks Productions
- Budget: 2 million

Original release
- Network: Sci Fi Channel
- Release: March 1, 2004

Skeleton Man is a 2004 made-for-TV action horror film directed by Johnny Martin and starring Michael Rooker and Casper Van Dien. It was aired from Sci Fi Channel on March 1, 2004. In the film, the titular Skeleton Man stalks a squad of soldiers.

== Plot ==
The film opens with an archaeologist looking at some artifacts he has dug up from an Indian burial ground. Among these items is the skull of an Indian chief, Skeleton Man appears through a portal and kills the archaeologist. Skeleton Man then chases the archaeologist's assistant to a power plant, killing her and the two men working there.

Skeleton Man, now on horseback, kills a soldier and chases his partner. Before being killed, the second soldier manages to record a video and send it back to his bosses. They receive it and send in Delta Force to deal with this unknown threat.

As they advance, a female soldier falls behind and is impaled through the chest. The team finds an old Indian man who tells them that Skeleton Man, known as Cottonmouth Joe, was a genocidal warrior who killed the old man's tribe and is now stalking the soldiers. The team pays him no heed.

Meanwhile, Cottonmouth Joe slaughters the workers at an oil pumping station. That night, two sentries are also killed (but are technically MIA as their bodies are never found). The team's scout (Casper Van Dien) also disappears.

The next day, the team encounters Cottonmouth Joe. The heavy weapons specialist charges him but is killed and the team opens fire to no effect. A support helicopter of Citizen's Militia is also destroyed. One man goes to recover the heavy weapons specialist's body but finds it missing. The squad then discovers the team scout, whom they accidentally shot in the firefight (Cottonmouth Joe having captured him and put him in a location to be shot). The team tries to lure their adversary into a trap, but run out of ammo. Another trooper is killed, as is the team sharpshooter who has her skull crushed by a tomahawk.

The two remaining troopers (Captain Leary (Michael Rooker) and Lieutenant Scott (Sarah Ann Schultz) again try to lure Cottonmouth Joe into a trap to no avail. Skeleton man ends his pursuit of them and heads to a nearby chemical plant where he kills several workers, two guards, the manager and several scientists. The two remaining soldiers arrive and find the place surrounded by law enforcement. Captain Leary takes a sheriff's Armsel Striker and goes to confront the undead adversary. After a cat-and-mouse chase through the chemical plant, Captain Leary lures Cottonmouth Joe into a generator room and blows him up with electric current.

As the film's credits begin to roll, they suddenly reverse and show Skeleton Man back on his horse in the woods, thus indicating that he has survived.

== Cast ==
- Jackie Debatin as Sergeant Cordero
- Eric Etebari as Lieutenant York
- Jonathon Klein as Power House Supervisor
- Robert Miano as Blind Indian
- Timothy V. Murphy as Sergeant Terry
- Maurice Nehru as Fighting Indian
- Lisa Rodriguez as Sergeant Smith
- David E. Ornston as Ross
- Carlos Rodriguez as Warrior Prince
- Michael Rooker as Captain Leary
- Bill M. Ryusaki as Ancient Medicine Man
- Paul Sampson as Nathan
- Sarah Ann Schultz as Lieutenant Scott
- Booboo Stewart as Child Warrior
- Maegan Stewart as Indian Princess
- Nils Allen Stewart as Sergeant Rodriguez
- Renee Stewart as Warrior
- Noa Tishby as Sergeant Davis
- Joey Travolta as The Sheriff
- Jerry Trimble as Staff Sergeant Lawrence
- Dominiquie Vandenberg as Cottonmouth Joe
- Casper Van Dien as Staff Sergeant Oberron
- Natalie Alexander as Lab Tech
- Carlos Buti as Indian Prince
- Paul Dion Monte as Shaman
- Andrew Stubblefield as Scared Construction Worker
- Ernesto Trinidad as Police Officer 1
- Mike Wike as Dead Savage

== Release ==
Skeleton Man was released on DVD by MTI Home Video on November 22, 2005. It was later released by Echo Bridge Home Entertainment on June 5, 2007 as a three-disk pack with Raging Sharks (2005), and Lifepod (1993). Echo Bridge would re-release the film multiple times in 2008, 2009, and 2010. The company would last release the film on February 7, 2012, as a part of its two-disk, Midnight Horror Collection Pack.

== Reception ==
Critical reception for the film has been extremely negative with critics panning the film's plot, acting, and monster costume.

Dread Central gave the film a positive and negative review stating, "This is one of those movies that requires two distinct ratings based on what frame of mind you’re in when you sit down to watch it. The only reason anyone should ever watch Skeleton Man is to either gawk at how unbelievably inept it is or to have bad movie night with some friends to do a little MST3K riffing at home. If you go into the movie with that attitude then I assure you it will deliver like few films you’ll ever witness. If you go into the movie looking for a legitimate movie watching experience then you better prepare yourself for one of the worst of your life. Either way, Skeleton Man is guaranteed to leave you in a state of shock and awe".

== See also ==
- Mosquito Man, a 2005 Sci Fi original film
- Snakeman, a 2005 Sci Fi original film
- Sharkman, a 2005 Sci Fi original film
