= The Black Hole (2006 film) =

2006 American television film

- Film poster
- Written by: David Goodin
- Story by: Kenneth M. Badish; Boaz Davidson
- Directed by: Tibor Takács
- Starring: Judd Nelson; Kristy Swanson
- Music by: John Dickson
- Country of origin: United States
- Original language: English

Production
- Producers: Kenneth M. Badish; Boaz Davidson
- Production companies: Nu Image Films; Equity Pictures Medienfonds GmbH

Original release
- Network: Sci Fi Channel
- Release: June 10, 2006

The Black Hole is a 2006 American television film produced for the Sci-Fi channel, directed by Tibor Takács and starring Judd Nelson and Kristy Swanson.

== Plot ==
Something goes awry at a particle accelerator facility in St. Louis, and a black hole begins to form. A creature exits the hole and seeks out energy. As the creature absorbs energy, the black hole expands in size and destroys a significant portion of St. Louis. Before the creature can be hit with a nuclear bomb, it is lured back to the black hole, and the black hole collapses on itself.

== Cast ==
- Judd Nelson as Dr. Eric Bryce, Nuclear Physicist
- Kristy Swanson as Dr. Shannon Muir
- David Selby as Ryker
- Heather Dawn as Alicia
- Jennifer Lyn Quackenbush as Elizabeth (credited as Jennifer Quackenbush)
- Christa Campbell as Advisor Coldwell
- Peter Mayer as General Tate
- Julia Sinks as Kayley
- James Anthony as Tolland (credited as Jim Anthony)
- Kevin Beyer as Dr. Hauser
- Dan Buran as Kent
- Tim Snay as Hayes
- Adrian Rice as Lieutenant Samson
- Chris Nolte as Hendricks
- Robert Giardina as James
- Rick Tamblyn as Wagner
- Ermal Williamson as The President
- Eric Lutes as Russ Martin, TV Reporter
- Atanas Srebrev as Delta Team Leader (uncredited)
- Kevin Stroup as Dr. Hans Reinhardt (uncredited)
