= Tesla (2020 film) =

2020 film by Michael Almereyda

- Theatrical release poster
- Directed by: Michael Almereyda
- Written by: Michael Almereyda
- Produced by: Michael Almereyda; Uri Singer; Christa Campbell; Isen Robbins; Lati Grobman; Per Melita; Elijah Long
- Starring: Ethan Hawke; Eve Hewson; Ebon Moss-Bachrach; Jim Gaffigan; Kyle MacLachlan
- Cinematography: Sean Price Williams
- Edited by: Kathryn J. Schubert
- Music by: John Paesano
- Production companies: Passage Pictures; BB Film Production; Campbell Grobman Films; Intrinsic Value Films; RNG Entertainment Oy; Millennium Media
- Distributed by: IFC Films
- Release dates: January 27, 2020 (Sundance); August 21, 2020 (United States)
- Running time: 102 minutes
- Country: United States
- Language: English
- Box office: $459,051

Tesla is a 2020 American biographical drama film written and directed by Michael Almereyda. It stars Ethan Hawke as Nikola Tesla. Eve Hewson, Ebon Moss-Bachrach, Jim Gaffigan, and Kyle MacLachlan also star.

The film had its world premiere at the 2020 Sundance Film Festival on January 27, 2020, and was released in selected theaters and via Premium VOD on August 21, 2020, by IFC Films.

== Plot ==
In 1893, Nikola Tesla and a female companion are roller skating. A narrator explains that Tesla was inspired as a young boy when he was petting his cat and saw static electricity.

Nine years prior, in 1884 New York City, Tesla is working for Thomas Edison, who disregards Tesla's suggestions of using alternating current, and does not want to pay him for the invention. Their coworker explains that Edison's disapproval was partly because of the death of his wife. When they smash ice cream cones on each other, the narrator interrupts and says that isn't how it happened. She explains how Google searches on Tesla show very few photographs and usually the same headshots. She goes into Tesla's childhood and schooling, and also that he tried to start his own company but failed, and ended up having to dig ditches. Edison, on the other hand, has more popularity, twice as many search results, but lives a lavish lifestyle and married and widowed young with his first wife Mary.

While Edison meets Mina, his second wife, in 1885, Tesla pitches his work on his induction motor to investors Brown and Peck. He and his assistant Szigeti impress Professor Anthony, who suggests he break up the invention into several patents. He meets Anthony's daughter Evelyn; and Anne Morgan, the daughter of J.P. Morgan and also the film's narrator.

George Westinghouse, an inventor and businessman, buys Tesla's patents and fund production where the latter would get a royalty for every product installed in a home. He shares a rivalry challenge from Edison who claims that direct current is superior, and that alternating current is dangerous. Edison shows the Westinghouse invention as a capital punishment tool on William Kemmler, who had killed his wife. Meanwhile, Tesla demonstrates his invention to an audience using two induction sticks that glow.

Szigeti invents a compass apparatus, but Tesla tells him it has already been invented, so Szigeti abandons his pursuits and seeks his fortune in South America. Kemmler's execution by electric chair is botched. Anne gets to know Tesla more. Tesla's invention is used to power's the World's Fair in 1893 in Chicago. Edison meets with Tesla and admits he was wrong about alternating current, and then he offers to partner with Tesla. Anne clarifies that this meeting never happened: Edison neither apologized nor offered to join forces.

Westinghouse tells Tesla that in order to keep his business going, he needs to do a merger, but has to cancel Tesla's contract regarding his horsepower royalties. Tesla tears up his contract.

Sarah Bernhardt, a celebrity actress, records for Edison's gramophone. She meets Tesla at her event, but Edison is envious of Tesla and escorts her away.

Later, Tesla oversees the design of the Niagara Falls hydroelectric power plant. J.P. Morgan asks Anne if she thinks Tesla is interested in romancing her. Anne talks with Tesla about it and finds he has plans for another invention, but unfortunately he is moving far away to Colorado. In 1899 Colorado Springs, he sets up his Tesla coil to harness and to transmit the power of the lightning storms.

Tesla meets up with Bernhardt who is touring the area. She shows interest in him, and invites him to attend her performance, but he does not show up. J.P. Morgan invests in his invention, giving him a check, which Tesla accepts.

In 1901, Edison's mining venture fails and he loses four million dollars. Tesla has not shown much progress in his work either, and even though Marconi has used Tesla's patents to transmit wireless signals, Tesla seems to be more interested in receiving and decoding signals he believes are from Mars. He asks J.P. Morgan for more funding, but is declined.

There's a scene of Tesla singing to "Everybody Wants to Rule the World", along with montage stills from the film.

Realizing she has no future with Tesla, Anne moves to France to work with an organization helping children. She explains how Tesla outlived his peers but dies alone at 87 years old. She reflects that today's world might be what he had imagined.

== Cast ==
- Ethan Hawke as Nikola Tesla
- Eve Hewson as Anne Morgan. She also acts as the film's contemporary narrator, talking about Google searches and having a MacBook laptop on her desk.
- Donnie Keshawarz as J.P. Morgan, a well-known banker and investor, father of Anne.
- Josh Hamilton as Robert Underwood Johnson, a journalist who befriends Tesla
- Ebon Moss-Bachrach as Anitai Szigeti, Tesla's assistant and friend from Budapest.
- Lucy Walters as Katharine Johnson, wife of Robert Johnson, friend of Tesla
- John Palladino as Bourke Cochran
- Michael Mastro as Charles Peck, an attorney/investor.
- Hannah Gross as Mina Edison, Thomas Edison's second wife
- Peter Greene as Nichols
- Blake Delong as William Kemmler, the first person to be executed by electric shocks
- Karl Geary as Francis Upton, coworker of Edison
- James Urbaniak as Professor Anthony, who reviews Tesla's invention
- Jim Gaffigan as George Westinghouse, a businessman and inventor who takes an interest in Tesla's work.
- Kyle MacLachlan as Thomas Edison, an inventor and entrepreneur who employs Tesla for six months and later acts as his rival.

Rebecca Dayan portrays actress Sarah Bernhardt, Emma O'Connor plays Anthony's daughter Evelyn, Lois Smith portrays The Grande Dame, and Ian Lithgow portrays banker/investor Alfred Brown.

== Production ==
In February 2018, it was announced Ethan Hawke had joined the cast of the film, with Michael Almereyda directing from a screenplay he wrote. The script was an updated form of the first feature Almereyda ever wrote, a Tesla biopic originally optioned to Polish director Jerzy Skolimowski that was never made. Almereyda "reinvented it for the present moment," adding details about Tesla that had been published or discovered since then and including changes based on other influences such as films by director Derek Jarman, episodes of Drunk History and author Henry James.

For the role, Hawke drew inspiration from both Tesla's own writings and singer David Bowie, who had played Tesla in The Prestige (2006).

== Release ==
Tesla had its world premiere at the 2020 Sundance Film Festival on January 27, 2020, where it won the Alfred P. Sloan Award. Shortly after, IFC Films acquired distribution rights to the film and released it in selected theaters and via Premium VOD on August 21, 2020.

== Reception ==
=== Box office and VOD ===
Tesla grossed $93,147 in the United States and Canada, and $365,904 in other territories, for a worldwide total of $459,051. It made $42,165 from 108 theaters in its opening weekend. That same weekend the film was the second-most rented on Apple TV, before finishing 10th at Apple TV and ninth on Spectrum the following weekend.

=== Critical response ===
On Rotten Tomatoes, the film has an approval rating of 58% based on 178 reviews, with an average rating of 6/10. The site's critics consensus reads, "Appropriately bold and ambitious, Tesla takes a number of risks that don't always pay off -- but Ethan Hawke's performance makes those flaws easier to forgive." On Metacritic, the film has a weighted average score of 67 out of 100, based on 30 critics, indicating "generally favorable reviews".
