= Cleaner (2007 film) =

- Promotional poster
- Directed by: Renny Harlin
- Written by: Matthew Aldrich
- Produced by: Steve Golin; Avi Lerner; Michael P. Flannigan; Samuel L. Jackson; Alix Madigan; Lati Grobman
- Starring: Samuel L. Jackson; Ed Harris; Eva Mendes; Keke Palmer; Luis Guzmán; Jose Pablo Cantillo; Robert Forster
- Cinematography: Scott Kevan
- Edited by: Brian Berdan
- Music by: Richard Gibbs
- Distributed by: Millennium Films
- Release date: May 27, 2007
- Running time: 88 minutes
- Country: United States
- Language: English
- Budget: $25 million
- Box office: $5.8 million

Cleaner is a 2007 American thriller film directed by Renny Harlin. It stars Samuel L. Jackson as crime scene cleaner Tom Cutler who thinks he has become part of a cover-up; Ed Harris, Keke Palmer and Eva Mendes also star. The film was released on May 27, 2007.

== Plot ==
Widowed single father and retired police officer Tom Cutler runs his own crime scene cleaning service. Eight years earlier, Tom's wife was murdered in a home invasion and robbery, which their daughter, Rose, then 6 years old, witnessed. The murderer, Daniel Hill, subsequently died after being stabbed in prison in circumstances that caused suspicion to fall on Tom and his friend and partner Eddie Lorenzo, Rose's godfather.

Tom receives an order, ostensibly from a Detective Jones, to clean up the scene of a shooting in an opulent home. He enters the house, as instructed, using a key hidden under a potted plant, catalogues the scene, and proceeds to clean it using his own mixture of chemicals. The next morning, Tom realizes he still has the key and goes back to the house to return it. The home's owner, Ann Norcut, is there and says she did not know Tom was there the previous day, nor why his services would be needed. Tom lies, telling her his office must have got the address wrong, then apologizes and leaves. She suspiciously watches him walk away.

Tom calls the police and learns that they have no record of the order and that there is no detective there named Jones. He puts the order sheet, photos of the scene, his audio notes, and the house key in an envelope and locks them away. He learns from Eddie, who is still on the force, that Ann's husband, John, is missing. Eddie suspects foul play, as John's disappearance occurred the day before he was to testify to a grand jury against corrupt former police commissioner Robert Vaughn.

Ann drops in on Tom at his office. He tells her about the cleaning services he provides, but declines to answer when she asks whether he did actually do work at her house.

Eddie finds Tom on a job and tells him the forensics team found no sign of a crime at the Norcut house, but did find traces of professional cleaning chemicals. Tom confides in Eddie and says he has not contacted the police because he could be in danger if he reports the situation to someone working for Vaughn. He also tells Eddie that when they were under investigation for Hill's murder, he did work for Vaughn in exchange for Vaughn shutting down the inquiry.

Ann tells Tom she does not trust the police. He admits he cleaned up after a shooting in her house. She shows him a ledger John kept of every transaction involving a corrupt officer on Vaughn's payroll; any of these officers, including Tom, could be a suspect in John's murder. Eddie urges Tom to destroy the ledger to protect himself.

Ann says she does not feel safe being alone and asks Tom to take her somewhere, so he takes her to stay at his employee Miguel’s home. She tells Tom she recently had a miscarriage. Tom accompanies Ann to the morgue to identify John's remains; the coroner reveals that John had a vasectomy several years earlier, so Tom deduces that John was not the father of the miscarried baby, that Ann was having an affair, and that the key left on the porch belonged to her boyfriend. He tells Eddie this, but suddenly realizes that Eddie is Ann's lover and the child's father.

Tom arranges a meeting to hand Eddie over to Detective Jim Vargas, who is investigating John's murder, but Rose calls from their apartment to say Eddie is there. Tom hurries home and confronts Eddie, who admits he killed John, believing that Ann had lied about miscarrying and John had forced her to have an abortion. Holding Tom at gunpoint, he pleads for support, but when patrol vehicles arrive, he angrily takes aim at him. Before he can fire, Rose takes Tom's sidearm and kills Eddie.

Vargas thanks Tom and takes the ledger, promising to burn it. Miguel proceeds to clean up Tom's apartment.

== Cast ==
- Samuel L. Jackson as Thomas "Tom" Cutler
- Ed Harris as Det. Edward "Eddie" Lorenzo
- Eva Mendes as Ann Norcut
- Keke Palmer as Rose Cutler
- Luis Guzmán as Det. James "Jim" Vargas
- Maggie Lawson as Cherie
- Jose Pablo Cantillo as Miguel
- Robert Forster as Arlo Grange
- Christa Campbell as Coach Beth Jensen

== Reception ==
On Rotten Tomatoes the film has an approval rating of 17% based on 12 reviews, with an average rating of 4.3/10. On Metacritic the film has a weighted average score of 49 out of 100, based on four critics, indicating "mixed or average" reviews.

Michael Rechtshaffen of The Hollywood Reporter gave it a positive review and wrote: "A neatly contained crime whodunit with a nifty setup and an expert lead performance from Samuel L. Jackson."

Eddie Cockrell of Variety wrote: "Scrub away a needlessly fussy visual style, trendy narrative tweaks and a climax both morally repugnant and logically absurd, and there's a tough little noir about buried transgressions coming out of the past in Renny Harlin's lackluster thriller Cleaner. Too mainstream to attract genre interest, and too tangled in its character motivations to sit well with the multiplex crowd, this is a minor stain that should fade quickly and leave only faint traces in ancillary."

== Home media ==
Cleaner was released on May 27, 2008, in the U.S. and opened at #5 and sold 75,312 DVD units, which gathered revenue of $1.5 million. It went on to sell 402,010 DVDs, which translated to revenues of $7.8 million.
