= Audie & the Wolf =

- Directed by: Brian S. O'Malley
- Written by: Brian S. O'Malley
- Story by: Frank Kowal III
- Produced by: Karol Ballard; Roger M. Mayer; Brian S. O'Malley; Jeff Orgill
- Starring: Christa Campbell; Rance Howard; Richard Riehle
- Cinematography: Kenneth Yeung
- Edited by: Brian S. O'Malley
- Music by: Karl Preusser
- Production company: Brooklyn Reptyle Productions
- Release date: August 14, 2008 (Los Angeles Downtown Film Festival)
- Country: United States
- Language: English

Audie & the Wolf is a 2008 American comedy horror film directed by Brian S. O'Malley and starring Christa Campbell, Rance Howard and Richard Riehle.

== Cast ==
- Christa Campbell as Rachel Brock
- Derek Hughes as John Doe
- Rance Howard as Dr. Maleosis
- Richard Riehle as Michael Ludlow
- Tara Price as Audie Bantam
