= Labor Pains (film) =

2009 film by Lara Shapiro

- DVD cover
- Directed by: Lara Shapiro
- Written by: Stacy Kramer; Lara Shapiro
- Produced by: Rick Schwartz; Celine Rattray; Lati Grobman
- Starring: Lindsay Lohan; Luke Kirby; Chris Parnell; Bridgit Mendler; Tracee Ellis Ross; Cheryl Hines
- Cinematography: Dan Stoloff
- Edited by: Anne McCabe
- Music by: Andrew Hollander
- Production companies: Millennium Films; Latitude Films; Overnight Productions; Plum Pictures
- Distributed by: ABC Studios; First Look Studios
- Release dates: June 19, 2009 (Romania); July 19, 2009 (ABC Family)
- Running time: 89 minutes
- Country: United States
- Language: English
- Box office: $1.9 million

Labor Pains is a 2009 American romantic comedy film directed by Lara Shapiro, who also wrote it with Stacy Kramer. It stars Lindsay Lohan as an unreliable assistant at a publishing house who fakes a pregnancy to avoid being fired by her boss. Luke Kirby, Bridgit Mendler, Chris Parnell, Cheryl Hines, Kevin Covais, Aaron Yoo and Tracee Ellis Ross also star in supporting roles.

The film was released theatrically in select international markets starting on June 19, 2009. In the United States, it premiered on ABC Family on July 19, 2009.

== Plot ==
Thea Clayhill is about to lose her position as secretary to the very cranky publisher Jerry. She decides to lie about being pregnant to save her job, after seeing on an episode of Law & Order that it is discriminatory to fire a pregnant woman. The plan works, and she gets to keep her job.

With help from her friend Lisa and a baby bump stolen from a mannequin, Thea fakes her pregnancy while figuring out her next move. In the meantime, her boss gets called out of town and his accountant brother Nick takes over.

In an attempt to get author Suzie Cavandish to publish her new book about pregnancy with the company, Nick takes Thea to meet the author. She convinces the writer they are the right home for her book. Nick then launches a new parenting division at the publishing company and promotes Thea to be the editor, and with the promotion comes a raise.

Stopping by the office to get Thea to sign a school permission slip, her younger sister Emma is shocked to see her with a baby bump. She ushers her out, explaining she had to as Jerry was about to fire her.

A romantic relationship soon begins between Thea and Nick after she breaks off her fake engagement with Miles. She begins to enjoy her life to the extent that her fake pregnancy becomes real to her.

In an attempt to get Thea to admit her lie to her family, her younger sister Emma throws Thea a surprise baby shower. When she still does not admit the lie, Emma destroys her pregnancy pillow in a fit of rage. Thea quickly grabs a balloon and leaves.

Later that day, the author of the book is going to have a book reading, but Nick's brother, and Thea's boss, comes back a week early, and gets into an argument with Nick. The brothers start to physically fight, but Thea pulls them apart. After insulting her, she tries to go at him. Nick holds Thea back by the stomach, and her balloon pops, blowing her cover.

After a couple of nights, Nick still does not answer the hundreds of messages Thea left him. She goes on a talk show to discuss the book Suzie wrote. She convinces Emma to bring Nick to the studio, they publicly make up. After everyone leaves, Thea and Nick kiss until the lights go out.

Two years later, Thea, who is actually pregnant with her and Nick's daughter, goes into labor. Nick and Lisa push Thea towards the door in her desk chair.

== Cast ==
- Lindsay Lohan as Thea Clayhill
- Luke Kirby as Nick Steinwald
- Bridgit Mendler as Emma Clayhill
- Chris Parnell as Jerry Steinwald
- Cheryl Hines as Lisa DePardo
- Kevin Covais as Greg
- Aaron Yoo as Miles
- Tracee Ellis Ross as Kristin
- Willie Garson as Carl
- Maree Cheatham as Ann
- Bonnie Somerville as Suzie Cavandish
- Ana Ortiz as Donna
- Janeane Garofalo as The Vista Host
- Creed Bratton as John Abbotts
- Pat Crawford Brown as Aunt Betty
- Keiko Agena as Pregnant Bookstore Woman
- Alexandra Barreto as Pretty Woman
- Jenni Blong as Pregnant Soccer Mom
- Christa Campbell as Brunette
- Darcy DeMoss as Redhead
- D.C. Douglas as Vista Producer
- Pete Gardner as Terry Bournachie
- Laura Liguori as Baby Shower Guest
- Lonny Ross as Phillip
- Marc Senter as Photographer
- Jessica St. Clair as Pregnancy Class Instructor
- Jay Thomas as Garth

== Production ==
Labor Pains began as a production under Capitol Films in June 2007. Due to budget issues regarding another film, Nailed, Millennium Films and Overnight Productions took over the project. Overnight's Rick Schwartz produced the film with Lati Grobman and Celine Rattray of Plum Pictures. It is the directorial debut of Lara Shapiro, who also wrote it alongside television writer Stacey Kramer (credited as Stacy in the film) with Lindsay Lohan in mind, who also ended up being the only actress she saw for the role. Both Shapiro and Kramer were pregnant, about a month apart, when they wrote the script. The script had originally been developed as a wide release film by Warner Bros., but when that option lapsed, Shapiro found other funding at smaller production companies before Lohan, who wasn't fazed by the idea of "low budget", came on board. Schwartz said production costs "were in line with what a place like ABC Family would spend on their original TV movies," adding that the film would ultimately be profitable. Filming began in Burbank, California, on June 9, 2008, and concluded on July 18, 2008. On September 3, 2008, a teaser trailer was released, listing the film as being in post-production.

Days before production began, it was officially announced Lohan had been cast in the lead role of the romantic comedy, after having recently pulled out of a number of projects, including All's Faire in Love, Poor Things and Manson Girls. Chris Parnell, Cheryl Hines, Luke Kirby, Kevin Covais and Janeane Garofalo were later announced as part of the cast. Connie Britton was initially slated to have a role in the film. Reportedly, only one insurance agency would take Lohan because of her personal struggles with addiction and probation status following two 2007 DUI arrests. The production drew intense attention from paparazzi, who were frequently present around the set due to the extensive media interest in Lohan. After production concluded, Shapiro expressed, "The stuff that you read about in the tabloids, I wasn't exposed to any of that. That was not my experience. Lindsay is such a natural. She's actually been working for so many years, it was more natural than you would think for her to segue into a more adult role. For me, it made my job a lot easier." Schwartz said: "I didn't know Lindsay before this, but we looked each other in the eye three months ago, and she has done everything I could have asked." Rattray added: "She has really impressed us with her work ethic. She is rehearsing every day with energy and focus. She is lovely to her co-stars and the crew." Hines, who had previously worked alongside Lohan in Herbie: Fully Loaded (2005), stated: "Habitually, Lindsay achieves what to do in the first take." In a promotional interview, Lohan revealed she was drawn to the project because it tells the story of a young woman caring for someone else while discovering love, offering an empowering perspective that she found unique, as she could not recall other similar films about a fake pregnancy.

== Release ==
In the United States, the film premiered on Disney-owned television network ABC Family on July 19, 2009. Tom Zappala, ABC Family's senior vice president of program acquisitions, stated they bought premiere rights to the film based on the Lohan romantic comedy premise alone and without needing to read the script as the network "continued to draw above-average ratings" from airings of her previous films, saying: "Lindsay's been a great draw for us, so we felt there was a good opportunity."

Labor Pains drew 2.1 million viewers, which was considered a "better-than-average prime-time audience" for ABC Family, ranking as the week's top cable film among coveted female demographic groups according to the network. It finished as the number one cable movie in women 18-34 for the year's third quarter. The film was then released on DVD and Blu-ray on August 4 in the United States by First Look Studios, and on August 31 in the United Kingdom by Entertainment One.

== Reception ==
=== Box office ===
Labor Pains received a theatrical release in select international markets. It was first released in Romania on June 19, 2009, grossing $39,574. The film was then released on July 9, 2009 in Russia, where it debuted at number four, grossing a total of $684,129, and in Spain on July 31, 2009, grossing $287,260. It was released to theatres in Mexico on January 8, 2010, opening at number eight and grossing a total of $670,871, in Lebanon on January 28, 2010, grossing $4,810, in the United Arab Emirates on April 29, 2010, bringing in $68,589, and also in Peru on September 9, 2010, debuting at number five for a $129,778 total. Combined, the worldwide total gross was $1,895,782.

=== Critical reception ===
Metacritic, which uses a weighted average, assigned the film a score of 54 out of 100, based on 7 critics, indicating "mixed or average" reviews. On the review aggregator website Rotten Tomatoes, 0% of 5 critics' reviews are positive. Entertainment Weekly's Leah Greenblatt praised Lohan and Hines's performances despite an apparent tiring premise, stating the former is "breezily, believably charming as the beleaguered Thea, shrugging off her tabloid hair shirt for a role that plays to the plucky Everygirl appeal that made her famous," while calling the latter an "arsenic-tongued hoot," and assessed the film as "goofy, broad-strokes summer fun." Writing for The New York Times, Alessandra Stanley said while the movie's premise "isn't terrible and neither is Ms. Lohan," the film is "supposed to be a light, escapist romantic comedy, but, sadly, it never shakes free of the heavy baggage Ms. Lohan brings to the role."

Mary McNamara of the Los Angeles Times stated that while Lohan delivers a strong performance, the screenwriting "offers an Olympian task for any star, involving as it does large and clunky leaps of logic over a cliché-riddled narrative landscape." The Hollywood Reporter's Randee Dawn also complimented Lohan as "a bright light in the center of an otherwise a fair-to-middling telefilm," declaring the film succeeds because of her. Brian Lowry of Variety wrote that the movie offers a "weak and improbable premise, though honestly, worse romantic comedies have certainly been unleashed into theaters," highlighting there's a "glint of chemistry between Lohan and Kirby" although the movie does not "truly explore the politics and pressures associated with pregnancy." David Hinckley from the New York Daily News described it as a "rather tired telemovie" and "all too predictable", commenting, "It's all good-natured, upbeat and occasionally funny."

== See also ==
- Kinda Pregnant
