= Campbell Grobman Films =

American film production company

- Type: Motion Picture
- Founded: 2011, USA
- Headquarters: United States
- Key people: Christa Campbell and Lati Grobman

Campbell Grobman Films is an American film and television production company founded by Christa Campbell and Lati Grobman in 2011. It is responsible for the feature-length films Texas Chainsaw 3D, Straight A's, The Iceman, Reality Show, and A Case of You as well as documentaries The Resort and Brave Miss World.

== Productions ==
Campbell-Grobman Films produces both documentaries and feature-length films.

=== Films ===
Year	Title	Notes
2012	The Resort	Documentary
2013	Texas Chainsaw 3D	
2013	Straight A's	
2013	Reality Show	
2013	Brave Miss World	Documentary
2013	A Case of You	
2014	Eliza Graves	
2015	Criminal	
2016	Chuck	
2017	The Hitman's Bodyguard	
2017	Leatherface	
2019	Hellboy	
2019	Rambo: Last Blood	
2020	Tesla	
2021	The Hitman's Wife's Bodyguard	
2021	Jolt	
2024	Hellboy: The Crooked Man	
TBA	Night Has Fallen	
