= Mozart and the Whale =

- Theatrical release poster
- Directed by: Petter Næss
- Written by: Ronald Bass
- Produced by: Boaz Davidson; Danny Dimbort; Manfred D. Heid; Frank DeMartini; Robert Lawrence
- Starring: Josh Hartnett; Radha Mitchell
- Cinematography: Svein Krøvel
- Edited by: Lisa Zeno Churgin; Miklos Wright
- Music by: Deborah Lurie
- Production company: Nu Image
- Distributed by: Millennium Films
- Release dates: September 10, 2005 (Brazil); April 14, 2006 (United States)
- Running time: 92 minutes
- Country: United States
- Language: English
- Budget: $12 million
- Box office: $84,447

Mozart and the Whale (released as Crazy in Love in some parts of Europe) is a 2005 American romantic comedy drama film directed by Petter Næss and starring Josh Hartnett and Radha Mitchell. The film is loosely based on the lives of Jerry and Mary Newport.

== Plot ==
Donald Morton is a taxi driver with Asperger syndrome and drives two Japanese passengers and his pet cockatiel around Spokane, Washington. Distracted, he bumps into the back of a florist's van, damaging his stock. Unfazed, Donald and his budgie take their groceries and leave, abandoning his taxicab and passengers. He takes his groceries to the self-help group for autistic adults. Before they head to the park to meet another autistic group, he tells one member, Gracie, to gather the women, and he will gather the guys to practice telling personal stories, but keeps getting distracted by performing mathematical sums of the microwaves' depleting numbers. He notices that Isabelle Sorenson, who also has Asperger's, a new name, has signed up and tells Gracie to let her go first.

At the park, Isabelle tells the women of a childhood memory: she saw that her parents were happy an Olympian had broken a record, so in order to please her parents, and taking what she heard literally, she broke their music records. Donald tells his story to the men about his ability to do complex sums, but couldn't make friends. Isabelle goes on to tell of when she was raped when she went hitchhiking. This causes Gracie to laugh manically. Heard by Donald, he tries to calm down an angry Isabelle, and they find that they have much in common and take a liking to each other.

After Isabelle talks to Gregory, a man also in the group who is taking notes on a notepad, he calls Donald over to ask Isabelle if she may escort him to a Halloween party on his behalf. However, before Donald has the chance, Isabelle asks Donald out for lunch. They go to the zoo the following day when Isabelle asks Donald to escort her instead of Gregory. They agree to meet in-costume Halloween night. Donald dresses as a whale but decides against attending, ultimately leaving Isabelle, dressed as Mozart, waiting. She goes to his apartment and they decide to take a walk about town and talk until the final bus is due when they share their first kiss.

Unsure when to call, Donald leaves multiple messages on her phone; she finally answers and they go to the amusement park. During a ring toss, the clanging of the metal rings hitting the bottles and the ringing of a bell cause Isabelle to scream and collapse on the floor. Donald takes her back to his filthy apartment and they agree to sleep together. The following day at the self-help group, Gregory accuses Donald of exploiting his position for sexual favors. Meanwhile, Isabelle occupies herself by waiting with Bronwin, one of the younger members of the group who recently learned that her father has blood cancer, until her parents pick her up.

Isabelle takes the liberty of cleaning Donald's apartment while he goes shopping. When he returns, he is horrified to see that everything is different; the piles of newspaper are stacked neatly, rotting food from the fridge is thrown away and has a new shower curtain and a toilet lid cover. He becomes angry at Isabelle for changing everything, by saying "you stole my life" before leaving again, although Isabelle thought that he would like it. He later leaves a number of apologetic messages on Isabelle's phone. The next day, he goes to the hair salon where Isabelle works as a hair stylist to apologize in person, and Isabelle forgives him, while introducing him as her boyfriend to the staff and her co-workers.

Isabelle shows Donald an abandoned rooftop, calling this a place where people who don't know where they belong can belong. She suggests that they can buy a house together and her therapist has arranged a job interview for a statistic analyst post at a university. He gets the job and they move into their new house, making it their own.

Donald tells Isabelle that he wants everything to be nice for when his boss, Wallace comes for dinner. Believing that he thinks that she doesn't keep the house nice, Isabelle spites Donald by keeping the pets uncaged, much to Donald's shock when he returns, and she maintains extroverted behavior and tells of her off-the-wall plans for the house. Donald explodes, asking how they're going to afford all that, which leads to the two of them arguing over it but when Isabelle says that they are both crazy, he retaliates by telling her that she is crazier, which leads to her throwing him out of the house. He stays with Gregory in his house, and after listening to a tearful answer message that Isabelle's rabbit, Bongo, has died, he runs to comfort her. Isabelle suggests that they should just be friends.

Donald invites Isabelle to a restaurant, where he proposes to her, much to Isabelle's dismay. She leaves abruptly back home and overdoses on an over the counter drug. Donald returns just in time to take her to the hospital, where Isabelle's psychiatrist advises him to leave her alone, testing his willpower to refrain from calling her.

Donald sees Isabelle leaving the university and follows her to the abandoned rooftop, where he says the only nice thing he had left to give her was not to call, to find that Isabelle was waiting for his call and she missed him. They express their true love with an embrace and kiss. The movie ends with the happy couple, now married, in their home, enjoying Thanksgiving dinner with the self-help group members.

== Cast ==
- Josh Hartnett as Donald Morton
  - Sharif Shawkat as Young Donald Morton
- Radha Mitchell as Isabelle "Izzy" Sorenson
  - Mercedee Smith as Young Isabelle "Izzy" Sorenson
- Rusty Schwimmer as Gracie
- Erica Leerhsen as Bronwin
- Gary Cole as Wallace
- Allen Evangelista as Skeets
- Nate Mooney as Roger
- Sheila Kelley as Janice
- John Carroll Lynch as Gregory
- Christa Campbell as Therapist

== Production ==
The screenplay was written by Ronald Bass, who also wrote Rain Man (1988), a film about an individual with autism. The script was based on the real-life story of Jerry and Mary Newport.

== Distribution ==
The film struggled to find a theatrical distributor in the United States. The studio tried to distribute it in the United States in April 2004, but it did not go farther than a month in Spokane, Washington, where the film was made. The film is available on DVD in a number of countries. The film became available on DVD in the United States in late 2006.

== Reception ==
According to a review in Variety by Todd McCarthy, "Material that easily could have been turned into cringe-inducing TV movie sap has been handled with reasonable intelligence and authenticity" and "This low-budget love story between two emotionally stunted young people with Asperger's Syndrome doesn't have the production sheen or star power of screenwriter Ron Bass' "Rain Man," but it's less cloying and contrived." In a review for The Spokesman-Review, Dan Webster writes, "Especially poignant are the scenes in which Donald attempts to overcome his nature in an effort to hold on to the love he's so long been denied."

The film was also criticized for perpetuating the media stereotype that people on the autism spectrum typically have savant skills.
