= Lies & Illusions =

- Directed by: Tibor Takács
- Written by: Eric James
- Produced by: Boaz Davidson; Danny Dimbort; Avi Lerner
- Starring: Christian Slater; Christa Campbell; Robert Giardina; Al Madrigal; Cuba Gooding Jr.
- Cinematography: Zoran Popovic
- Edited by: Jason A. Payne
- Music by: Stephen Edwards
- Release date: September 29, 2009
- Running time: 93 minutes
- Country: United States
- Language: English

Lies & Illusions is a 2009 film directed by Tibor Takács starring Christian Slater and Cuba Gooding Jr. A self-help author (Slater) becomes mixed up in a theft that involves a criminal (Gooding, Jr.).

== Plot ==
The film begins with self-help author Wes Wilson who has recently come out with his first best selling book. At the after-party, he meets up with an attractive woman named Samantha. They flirt, and he proposes publicly. He introduces her to his agent, who tries to talk Wes into writing a sequel. Wes dismisses the agent and takes Samantha to his car to leave the party early. They are attacked in the parking lot, and Samantha is knocked out and kidnapped.

Time passes slowly for Wes, who is haunted by his inability to save her. At a book signing, however, Wes also encounters Nicole, a young woman who says she is a reporter. He goes to her house for an interview, and they bond, and he enters into a relationship with her. A few more months pass and Wes and Nicole become a happy couple.

Suddenly a mysterious man named Isaac who Wes had met before at the book signing, shows up and demands to know where some diamonds are. Wes runs away, and Isaac's main henchman Boone and another give chase. Wes is kidnapped as a result along with Nicole and Isaac orders him to go to some bank and empty the contents of a safety deposit box which could be the diamonds themselves. Wes finds a briefcase and then he and Nicole are released. To Isaac's surprise, there is only a stuffed toy in the briefcase and he resumes his hunt for the diamonds.

Eventually, Wes gets back to his apartment, only to find Samantha there to his shock and surprise. She apologizes and tells Wes she stole the diamonds from Isaac and that Isaac won't stop until they are dead and he has the diamonds but Wes is still heartbroken that she would betray him like that as he felt guilty for not being able to help her and believed that she was dead for so long. Samantha also tells him that Nicole wants the diamonds as well and tells him to meet her under a bridge. Just then, one of Isaac's henchmen shows up, and Samantha kills him after much effort. Wes is frightened, and leaves.

Isaac eventually kidnaps Wes and, using him as a lure, finds Samantha, who tells him where the diamonds are. Wes gets the diamonds, but decides to run away. Again, Isaac and his henchmen give chase, and a shootout ensues in which Boone is shot and likely killed. Isaac shoots Wes in the arm, and calmly takes the diamonds. Samantha escapes while Nicole helps Wes.

Isaac is shown admiring the diamonds on his jet, when Samantha comes out of the cockpit, showing that she has shot the pilot. She shoots Isaac twice, and jumps out of the jet. The plane crashes and Isaac dies as a result.

Later, Wes is talking to his agent, Martin Rivera about writing another book on his adventures, hinting it will be labeled as fiction. He thinks he sees Samantha outside, only to find it is someone else. About ready to give up, Samantha suddenly appears and uses the same pick up line he teased her with at the party at the opening of the film and they happily reunite.

Boone, revealed to have survived the shootout, sits down next to Wes' agent and says he has a plan for a book about recipes for couples who are having marital troubles.

== Cast ==
- Christian Slater as Wes Wilson
- Cuba Gooding Jr. as Isaac
- Sarah Ann Schultz as Samantha
- Robert Giardina as Boone
- Al Madrigal as Martin Rivera
- Christa Campbell as Nicole Williams
- Lochlyn Munro as Andrew Laughlin

== Production ==
Shooting began in March 2008 in Spokane, Washington.

== Release ==
In the United States, the film went direct-to-DVD and was released on September 29, 2009.

== Reception ==
Jim Kershner of The Spokesman-Review wrote that the film's explicit setting in Spokane is refreshing but the content is appalling. James Luxford of The National wrote, "The majority of the film is taken up by chases, usually involving a window being smashed, and despite one impressive car stunt there is very little to recommend." Thomas Spurlin of DVD Talk rated it 1.5/5 stars and wrote, "A decent idea gets drowned in garbled tones and subpar performances with Lies and Illusions, a hybrid flick void of effectiveness in either its aggravating humor or its uninteresting suspense."
