= Spiders 3D =

- Theatrical release poster
- Directed by: Tibor Takács
- Written by: Joseph Farrugia; Tibor Takács; Boaz Davidson; Dustin Warburton
- Produced by: Boaz Davidson; Israel Ringel
- Starring: Patrick Muldoon; Christa Campbell; William Hope
- Cinematography: Lorenzo Senatore
- Edited by: Joseph Plenys
- Music by: Joseph Conlan
- Production company: Nu Image
- Distributed by: Millennium Films
- Release date: February 8, 2013
- Running time: 89 minutes
- Country: United States
- Language: English
- Budget: $7 million

Spiders (also marketed as Spiders 3D or Spiders in 3D) is a 2013 American 3D science fiction monster horror film directed by Tibor Takács. The film was released in limited theaters on February 8, 2013.

== Plot ==
Debris from a destroyed Soviet space station—where experiments on genetically altered giant spiders were conducted—crashes into a New York City Subway tunnel where Jason Cole works. During the investigation, Jason’s coworker Jimmy is bitten by something in the dark and dies, and doctors later discover strange insect‑like eggs inside his body. Authorities reopen the station despite concerns from health official Rachel Cole (Jason Cole's wife), but soon rats, webs, and bodies are found in the tunnels, prompting a full quarantine and a cover story about a viral outbreak.

A Russian‑aligned scientist, Dr. Darnoff, reveals that the spiders originate from alien genes recovered decades earlier, and that Jimmy carried the queen egg. The queen’s webbing could be militarily valuable, and US Army Colonel Jenkins—secretly cooperating with the Russians—plans to secure it at any cost, even killing civilians. Rachel’s report draws attention, and she and her daughter Emily are targeted when the queen egg sample ends up in her possession.

As the spiders grow to enormous size and emerge onto the streets, Jason and Rachel navigate the tunnels to rescue Emily, fighting off attacks while evading the conspirators. Jenkins attempts to capture the queen despite warnings, and she kills Darnoff before pursuing Jason’s family. Jason distracts the queen, lures her into a subway train, and engineers a fiery crash that destroys her and the nest. He reunites with Rachel and Emily as authorities clean up the aftermath. However a final shot reveals a surviving mutant spider.

== Cast ==
- Patrick Muldoon as Jason Cole
- Christa Campbell as Rachel Cole
- Pete Lee-Wilson as Dr. Darnoff
- Sydney Sweeney as Emily Cole
- Shelly Varod as Phoebe
- Jesse Steele as Bill
- William Hope as Colonel Jenkins
- Atanas Srebrev as Jimmy
- Vincenzo Nicoli as Caz
- Owen Davis as Apartment Soldier
- Jon Mack as Stella
- Sarah Brown as Sarah

== Production ==
Filming took place in Bulgaria and director Takács had to create the city of Manhattan "on a studio backlot that includes several blocks of what looks like Greenwich Village". In order to make some parts of the film more closely resemble Manhattan, particularly the subway scenes, the director brought in some extra set pieces to help enhance the scenes. The spiders were predominantly CGI created, but Takács used a 3-foot-long soldier-spider claw for some shots.

== Reception ==
Spiders 3D holds a 11% approval rating on Rotten Tomatoes, based on nine reviews with an average rating of 3.5/10. Fearnet gave Spiders 3D a negative review, but said that the movie would have some appeal to fans of films akin to Spiders.
