= Michail Grobman =

Russian-born Israeli poet and painter (1939–2025)

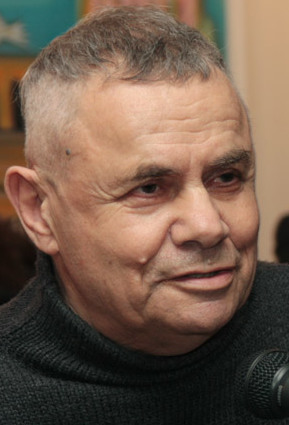
Grobman in 2013

Michail Grobman (Russian: Михаил Гробман, Hebrew: מיכאיל גרובמן; 21 September 1939 – 23 November 2025) was a Russian-born Israeli poet and painter. He was father to Hollywood producer Lati Grobman and Israeli architect Yasha Jacob Grobman.

== Life and career ==
Michail Grobman was born in Moscow on 21 September 1939, to an engineer's family. During his school years, he went by the pseudonym Michel Afinsky. In 1956–1958, he studied at an evening school and worked as a mason at a construction site, where he began a friendship with the poet and dissident Vladimir Gershuni (1930–1995), who influenced the formation of Grobman's political views.

In 1957, at the exhibition of the 40th anniversary of Soviet art in the Central House of Art Workers, he was arrested. He was released the next day.

In 1959, Grobman's first solo exhibition took place at the Leningrad Vera Mukhina Higher School of Art and Design, and in 1965, at the House of Artists in Moscow, where Grobman's works on Jewish themes were exhibited, which was an almost unbelievable event for that time.

In 1965, he published a cycle of poems in the American literary almanac “Airways” under the pseudonym Mikhail Rusalkin. Later, this pseudonym was lost, and for the second time in this publication, Grobman was published as G.D.E.

In 1967, he was admitted to the Artists' Union of the USSR. In 1971, he emigrated to Israel and lived in Jerusalem. In 1975, together with friends and students, he organized the group of Israeli artists "Leviathan", published the magazine of the same name.

Grobman lived in Tel Aviv from 1983 onwards, where he died on 23 November 2025, at the age of 86.

Grobman's works are in the Tretyakov Gallery and the Pushkin Museum of Fine Arts (Moscow), the State Russian Museum (St. Petersburg), the Tel Aviv Museum of Art, the Ludwig Museum in Cologne, the Pompidou Centre (Paris), etc., and in private collections in Israel, the USA, Germany and Russia.

== Biography ==
- 1939 – Born in Moscow.
- 1960s – Active member of The Second Russian Avant-Garde movement in the Soviet Union.
- 1967 – Member of Moscow Artists Union.
- 1971 – Emigrates to Israel and settles in Jerusalem.
- 1975 – Founded the Leviathan group and art periodical (in Russian).
- 1983–2025 – he lived and worked mainly in Tel Aviv.

== Awards ==
- In 2001, Grobman was a co-recipient of the Dizengoff Prize for Painting.

== Solo exhibitions ==
- 2007 – Last Skies, Loushy & Peter Art & Projects, Tel Aviv (cat. text: Marc Scheps)
- 2006 – Creation From Chaos to Cosmos, Bar-David Museum of Fine Art and Judaica, Kibbutz Baram (cat. text: Sorin Heller)
- 2002 – The Last Sky, installation, Tsveta Zuzoritch pavilion, Belgrad (cat. text: Irina Subotitch)
- 1999 – Michail Grobman: Works 1960–1998, The State Russian Museum, St. Petersburg (cat. texts: Evgenija Petrova, Marc Scheps, Lola Kantor-Kazovsky, Michail German)
- 1998 – Picture = Symbol + Concept, Herzliya Museum of Art, Herzliya (cat. texts: Lola Kantor-Kazovsky, Marina Genkina)
- 1995 – Password and Image, University Gallery, Haifa University (Leaflet)
- 1990 – Michail Grobman, Tova Osman Gallery, Tel Aviv
- 1989 – Michail Grobman, Tova Osman Gallery, Tel Aviv
- 1989 – The Beautiful Sixties in Moscow (Jointly with Ilia Kabakov), The Genia Schreiber University Art Gallery, Tel Aviv University, Tel Aviv (cat. text: Mordechai Omer)
- 1988 – Michail Grobman: Künstler und Sammler, Art Museum, Bochum, Germany (cat. text: Peter Spielmann)
- 1987 – Messiah, installation and performance in the streets of Jerusalem (cat.)
- 1985 – Khlebnikov 100, performance in the streets of Acre, Jerusalem, Tiberias and Tel-Aviv
- 1984 – Michail Grobman, Zvi Noam Gallery, Beit Levik, Tel Aviv
- 1977 – Michail Grobman, Spertus Museum, Chicago
- 1977 – Performance in Judean desert
- 1973 – Michail Grobman, Negev Museum, Beer Sheva
- 1973 – Michail Grobman, Beth Uri and Rami Museum, Ashdot Yaacov (cat.)
- 1972 – Michail Grobman, Nora Gallery, Jerusalem
- 1971 – Michail Grobman: Paintings, Drawings, Prints, Tel Aviv Museum of Art, Tel Aviv (cat. text: Haim Gamzu)
- 1966 – Michail Grobman, Projects Engineering Institute, Moscow
- 1965 – Michail Grobman, Artists House, Moscow
- 1965 – Michail Grobman, Energy Institute, Moscow
- 1965 – Michail Grobman, History Institute, Moscow
- 1965 – Michail Grobman, Usti-nad-Orlicy Theatre, Czechoslovakia (leaflet text: Dushan Konetchni)
- 1959 – Michail Grobman, Mukhina Art Institute, Leningrad

== Writing ==
- "Moscow Diaries", New Literary Observer, vol. 84, 2007 – in Russian
- Last Sky – Poems, New Literary Observer, Moscow, 2006 – in Russian
- "Poems and Articles", Symbol We: Jewish Anthology of Russian Literature, New Literary Observer, Moscow, 2003 – in Russian
- Leviathan: Diary 1963–1971, New Literary Observer, Moscow, 2002– in Russian
- "Leviathan. Manifestos", Zerkalo, vol. 19–20, 2002 – in Russian
- Military Notebooks – Poems, Leviathan Publishers, Tel Aviv, 2002 – in Russian
- "about Vladimir Jakovlev", Vladimir Jakovlev: Zivopis, Grafika, catalogue of the exhibition, State Tretyakov Gallery, Moscow, 1995
- "The Enigma of Isaak Levitan", Isaak Levitan, 1860–1900: Sketches & Paintings, Exhibition Catalogue, Tel Aviv Museum of Art, Tel Aviv, 1991
- "About Malevich", Avant-Garde – Revolution – Avant-Garde: Russian Art from the Collection of Michail Grobman, Exhibition Catalogue, Tel Aviv Museum of Art, Tel Aviv, 1988
- "About Malevich", The Avant-Garde in Russia 1910–1930: New Perspectives, Exhibition Catalogue, Los Angeles County Museum of Art, MIT Press, Cambridge, Massachusetts, 1980
- Leviathan, newspaper of modern art and literature, nos. 1–3 (1975–1980) – in Russian

== Selected bibliography ==
- Valentin Vorobiov, Vrag Naroda. Vospominania khudozhnika, New Literary Observer, Moscow, 2005
- Irina Alpatova (ed.), Drugoie Iskusstvo, Galart, Moscow, 2005
- Matthew Baigel, "Soviet Artists, Jewish Imagery: Selections from The Norton and Nancy Dodge"
- "Collection of Soviet Non-Conformist Art", Zimmerly Journal, vol. 2, 2004
- "A-Ya: Unofficial Russian Art Review", Art Chronic, Moscow, 2004
- Victor Pivovarov, Vlubleniy Agent, New Literary Observer, Moscow, 2001
- Lidya Sooster, My Sooster, Avinarius, Tallinn, 2000
- Gunter Hirt, Sascha Wonders (Eds.), Präprintium, Moskauer Bücher aus dem Samizdat Edition Temmen, Bremen, 1998
- Alexander Goldstein, Rasstavanie s Nartsisom, New Literary Observer, Moscow, 1997
- Gabrielle Sed-Rajna (1997). Jewish Art. New York: Harry Abrams. ISBN 978-0810935143.
- "Interviews Michailom Grobmanom", Simurg, Jerusalem, 1997
- Marina Genkina, "Vtoroi Russkiy Avant-Garde", in Evrei v Kulture Russkogo Zarubezia, vol. 5, Jerusalem, 1996
- Anna Zhuravleva, Vsevolod Nekrasov, Paket, Moscow, 1996
- Michail Gorelik, "Russkij ili Russkojazytchnyy", Novoye Vremia, vol. 43, 1996
- Victoria Motchalova, "Energia Voproshania", Inostrannaia Literatura, vol. 2, February 1996
- Marc Scheps (ed.), The Art of the Twentieth Century: Lexicon, Taschen, Cologne, 1996
- Andrey Voznesensky, "Kabalisticheskaia Expertiza", Obozrevatel, vol. 12, December 1995
- Karl Eimermacher, Vladimir Jakovlev: Gemälde, Aquarelle, Zeichnungen Bayer, Bissingen, 1995
- E. Beaucamp, "Die Kunst sucht ihre Zeit", Frankfurter Allgemeine Zeitung, 22 July 1995
- Volfgang Kazak, "Konets Emigratsii", Znamia, November 1994
- Rossijskaia Evreiskaia Entsiklopedia, Rossijskaia Academia Nauk, Moscow, 1994
- Thomas Strauss, "Anschlag auf den Heiligenschein der Bilder", Magenta, Munchen, 1994
- V. Pavlov, "Popugay s Toporom", Iskusstvo, January 1994
- E. Barnavi, ed. (1992). A Historical Atlas of the Jewish People. Knopf. ISBN 978-0679403326.
- F. Raphael, "From the left Bank to the West Bank", Mirabella vol. 1, October 1990
- Thomas Strauss, "Bilder einer Gottessuche", Frankfurter Allgemeine Zeitung, 18 July 1988
- Michail Tchernyshov, Moskva 1961–67, New York, 1988
- F. Rotzer, "Kunstlergruppen zeigen Gruppenkunst-werke", Kunstforum, vol. 91, 1987
- Israel Shamir, Sosna i Oliva, Wahlstorm Publishers, Jerusalem, 1987
- Velemir Chlebnikov, Stichi, Poemi, Proza, Gileia, New York, 1986
- Alexander Glezer, Russian Artists in the West: Third Wave, Jersey City, 1986
- Marina Genkina, "Michail Grobman", The Shorter Encyclopaedia Judaica in Russian, vol. 3, The Hebrew University, Jerusalem, 1986
- Stephen Feinstein, Soviet Jewish Artists in the USSR and Israel, Armonk, New York & M. E. Sharpe, London, 1985
- Jack Miller, ed. (1983). Jews in Soviet Culture. London: Transaction Books. ISBN 978-0878554959.
- Rimma and Valery Gerlovin, "Russian Samyzhdat Books" Flue, vol. 2, New York, Spring 1982
- Viktor Tupitsin, "Russian Art", Kolkhoz, vol. 2, New York, 1982
- A. Rovner (ed.), Gnosis Anthology, 2 vols, Gnosis Press, New York, 1982
- L. Bechtereva (Galina Manevich), Varianty Otrazenij, A-Ya, Paris, 1982
- A.Volochonsky, "Leviathan v Belom Svete", Dvadtsat Dva, 15, Tel Aviv, November 1980
- M. Oxhorn (21 September 1980). "Cries and Whispers from Soviet Artists". The Baltimore Sun.
- Frantishek Kincl (ed.), Schwarz auf Weiss, vol. 6, Düsseldorf, August 1980
- Hilton Kramer (20 July 1980). "The Mystical Basis of the Russian Avant-Garde". The New York Times. p. D23.
- Gil Goldfine (22 October 1976). "Michail Grobman". The Jerusalem Post.
- Miriam Tal: "Magischer Symbolismus in Israel: Werk und Personlichkeit von Michail Grobman" Das Neue Israel, vol. 3, Zurich, September 1974
- Yuri Kuperman, "No Places: The Jewish Outsiders in the Soviet Union", Soviet Jewish Affairs, vol. 2, London, Summer 1973
- Miriam Tal, "Two Russian Artists", Israel Magazine, vol. 11, November 1972
- Miriam Tal, "Les Arts en Israel", Liberté, vol. 82–83, Montreal, October 1972
- Miriam Tal, "Painters from Soviet Russia", Ariel, vol. 30, Spring 1972
- Reuven Berman, "Art out of Russia", The Jerusalem Post, 24 December 1971
- J. Nicholson, "La Nouvelle gauche a Moscou: notes sur quelques autres", Chroniques de I'art vivant, September 1971
- Arsen Pohridni, "I Clandestini del penello", Panorama 240, Milano, 19 November 1970
- A. M. Fabian, "Russische Avantgarde heute", Madame und Elegante Welt, Munchen, 1970
- Arsen Pohribny, "Art and Artists of the Underground", Problems of Communism, Washington, March–April 1970
- Asiaticus (Arsen Pohribny), "I pittori del disegno", L'Espresso Colore, Roma, 16 March 1970
- W. Schulze-Roempell, "Russische Avantgarde", Die Welt, 27 February 1970
- G. Engels, "Moskaus Avantgarde herausgeschmug-gelt", Kolnische Rundschau, 5 February 1970
- V. Vanslov (ed.), Sovetskoe Izobrazitelnoe Iskusstvo i Zadachi Borby S Burzhuaznoj Ideologiei, Izobrazitelnoe Iskusstvo, Moscow, 1969
- Dušan Konečny, Hledání Tvaru, Svei Sovetu, Prague, 1968
- Jindřich Chalupecký, "Ouverture a Moscou", Opus International, no. 4, London, 4 December 1967
- Miroslav Lamač, "Quelques jeunes peintres", Opus International, no. 4, London, 4 December 1967
- Jindřich Chalupecký, "O Moderno Urneni v Sovetskern Svazu", Vytvarne Prace, Prague, 21 September 1967
- Jiři Padrata, "Neue Kunst in Moskau", Das Kunstwerk, vol. 7–8, Baden-Baden, April–May 1967
- Miroslav Lamač, "I giovani pittori di Mosca", La Biennale die Venezia, vol. 62, Venezia, 1967
- Jiři Padrata, "Neue Kunst in Moskau", Kulturni Tvotba, Prague, 5 January 1967
- John Berger (6 November 1966). "The unofficial Russians". The Sunday Times. London.

== See also ==
- Visual arts in Israel
