= Blonde Ambition =

2007 film by Scott Marshall

- Theatrical release cover
- Directed by: Scott Marshall
- Written by: John Cohen; David McHugh; Matthew Flanagan
- Produced by: Lati Grobman; Dave Ornston; Richard Salvatore; Freddy Braidy; Jeff Rice; Jim Reach; Michael Santos; Justin Berfield; Jason Felts; Joe Simpson
- Starring: Jessica Simpson; Luke Wilson; Rachael Leigh Cook; Penelope Ann Miller; Andy Dick; Drew Fuller; Larry Miller; Willie Nelson
- Cinematography: Mark Irwin
- Edited by: Tara Timpone
- Music by: David Kitay
- Production companies: Millennium Films; Papa Joe Films
- Distributed by: First Look International
- Release date: December 21, 2007
- Running time: 93 minutes
- Country: United States
- Language: English
- Box office: $1.6 million

Blonde Ambition is a 2007 American romantic comedy film directed by Scott Marshall and starring Jessica Simpson as a small-town girl who moves to New York City and rises up into a career as a business woman. The film also stars Luke Wilson, Rachael Leigh Cook, Penelope Ann Miller, Andy Dick, Drew Fuller, Larry Miller and Willie Nelson.

Initially planned as a direct-to-video release, the film was released into eight theatres on December 22, 2007, before being issued on DVD on January 22, 2008. Blonde Ambition received generally negative reviews from film critics.

== Plot ==
Katie Gregerstitch and Billy are high school sweethearts from Minden, Oklahoma, who are engaged to be married. An aspiring model, Billy travels to New York City, promising to be back in six months for the wedding.

On Valentine's Day, Katie's grandfather gives Katie a bus ticket to surprise Billy, but she catches him in bed with another woman. Billy breaks off the engagement with Katie, who then goes to stay with her cousin Haley, an aspiring actress. She convinces Katie to start an independent life of her own. One day, when Haley has an audition, Katie takes over her job as a messenger.

When Katie makes a delivery to a large building construction company, she befriends the company's deputy director Debra. Debra schemes to become CEO of the company and hatches a plan to frame the current CEO, Richard Connolley, for sabotage. She and her assistant Freddy make sure that Richard's secretary gets dismissed and that the naive Katie takes her place. Debra takes Katie to give her a makeover. With a more professional appearance, and a resumè embellished by Freddy, Katie gets hired by Richard. Katie meanwhile befriends Ben, who works as a postman in the building.

Katie has an idea to attract a potential investor to the company, but it is sabotaged by Debra and Freddy. Katie gets fired, but she uses her charms to get a second chance from Richard. She secures the interest of a group of Norwegian investors with Ben's help.

Richard shares information about an important confidential marina project with Katie. Debra manages to get the confidential information out of Katie, who does not realize her ulterior motives. That evening Ben shows up at Katie's for a date, after which Katie's grandfather gives her a surprise visit. The next day at work, Debra ensures the Board of Directors fires Richard, using information from the report she'd weaseled out of Katie the previous day. She also discloses that Katie's resumé is embellished.

Returning to the apartment, Katie finds Billy waiting for her. She turns him away, only to have her grandfather reappear with him. Billy convinces her to pack up to return to Minden. Before they leave, Katie's grandfather is made aware of Billy's infidelity and instead takes Billy back home.

Meanwhile, as Katie discovers that Ben is actually Richard's son, her and Ben devise a ruse to outsmart Debra. When she proposes the project to the investors, it is actually Haley and some friends who pose as the investors. At the same time, Katie presents her own proposal to the real investors, who satisfyingly take it. When Debra discovers the deception, she flies into a rage and thus gets fired. Afterwards, Katie gets Richard reinstated and shares a kiss with Ben.

== Cast ==
- Jessica Simpson as Katie Gregerstitch
- Luke Wilson as Ben Connelly
- Drew Fuller as Billy
- Rachael Leigh Cook as Haley
- Paul C. Vogt as Floyd
- Andy Dick as Freddy
- Bill Jenkins as Robert Perry
- Karen McClain as Betty
- Larry Miller as Richard Connelly
- Penelope Ann Miller as Debra
- Piper Mackenzie Harris as Amber Perry
- Sarah Ann Schultz as Samantha
- Dan Braverman as Cab Driver
- Willie Nelson as Pap Paw
- Casey Keene as Office Assistant
- Ryan Dunn as Griswold
- Christa Campbell as Female Office Worker #1

== Reception ==
=== Box office ===
Blonde Ambition was intended to be a direct-to-video release, but was released into eight theatres in Texas, the home state for stars Simpson and Wilson, on December 21, 2007, before a DVD release date on January 22, 2008. On its opening day, the film grossed a total box office of $384, meaning that based on an $8 ticket price, 48 people in total went to see the film. In its opening weekend, the film finished 54th at the North American box office with a three-day gross of $1,332 and a per-theater-average of $165.

In Ukraine, the film opened at number one in its first weekend (February 16–17, 2008), earning $253,008. In Russia, Blonde Ambition opened at number seven at the box office and grossed $1,010,235; in the Philippines it opened at number five and grossed $16,538.

Blonde Ambition grossed $2.7 million within the first five days of its DVD release, ranking #23 on the Rotten Tomatoes DVD sales chart. Since the movie's DVD release, it has grossed $11.56 million in the United States.

=== Critical response ===
On the review aggregator website Rotten Tomatoes, 14% of 7 critics' reviews are positive, with an average rating of 3.9/10.

Joe Leydon of Variety gave it a negative review but said that it "sustains a sense of buoyancy" that makes it "relatively painless".

== Home media ==
The DVD was released in the US on January 22, 2008, and has also been released on iTunes. In the United Kingdom and Ireland, the film was released direct-to-DVD in June 2010.
