= Alchemy (company) =

Former film distribution company

- Formerly: Millennium Entertainment
- Type: Private
- Industry: Film, home entertainment, distribution
- Predecessor: First Look Studios
- Founded: 2010; 16 years ago
- Defunct: June 30, 2016; 10 years ago
- Fate: Chapter 7 bankruptcy liquidation
- Successor: FilmRise
- Headquarters: Los Angeles, California
- Products: Independent theatrical films, DVD, Blu-ray
- Website: www.millenniumentertainment.me

Alchemy (formerly Millennium Entertainment) was an American independent global film distributor based in Los Angeles, California. The company acquired and distributed feature films, television series and specialty programming.

== History ==
Millennium Entertainment was 60% owned by production company Nu Image. Exclusive Media Group owned 20% and Prentice Capital owned the remaining stock. Following its formation in 2010, the company marked its first noteworthy theatrical release in 2011 with Trust, starring Academy Award nominees Clive Owen, Catherine Keener, and Viola Davis. Alchemy owns and operates a film library consisting of over 1,000 titles, including Paris, Je’TAime, Transsiberian, and Bad Lieutenant: Port of Call New Orleans, as well as the recent titles Elephant White, starring Djimon Hounsou and Kevin Bacon; Shadows and Lies, starring James Franco; and Blitz, starring Jason Statham.

Millennium Entertainment logo

Television series released by Alchemy include The Cosby Show, Baywatch, and A Different World. First Look Studios originally released all eight seasons of The Cosby Show, A Different World, and other shows on DVD, but they eventually filed bankruptcy in 2010. Millennium Entertainment acquired all of First Look Studios’ assets, and continued to release them in the United States, Canada, Bermuda, and other U.S. Territories. In April 2013, it was announced that Millennium Entertainment would be sold, and an investment company, Salem Partners, would assist in the sale. In August 2014 the company's library and distribution assets had been sold to a consortium consisting of its current management and Virgo Investment Group. The new owners renamed the company Alchemy in January 2015, finally cutting ties to its former sister company Millennium Films.

In July 2015, Alchemy acquired the film distribution assets of ANconnect and the digital film and television distributor Anderson Digital, both divisions of Anderson Media Corporation. The transaction will result in the addition of 40 new employees to the existent 70 and expand the company's catalogue to over 1,300 films and 3,000 TV episodes. In December 2015, Bill Lee exited the company as CEO.

=== Bankruptcy ===
In February 2016, Alchemy laid off 40 employees, equaling 40% of the company's entire staff. due to liquidity issues. The company began selling off previously acquired films including The Lobster, Free Fire, Mia Madre, 31 and Evolution. The Lobster and Free Fire were purchased by A24, while Mia Madre was sold to Music Box Films, 31 to Saban Films and Evolution to IFC Midnight. The last of their acquisitions, Zeroville, wasn't released until 2019.

Alchemy filed for Chapter 7 bankruptcy on June 30, 2016. All employees were released following the bankruptcy.

Alchemy's remaining film library is currently owned by FilmRise.

== Releases ==
=== TV series ===
- Bethenny Ever After
- Baywatch
- The Cosby Show
- A Different World
- Flipping Out
- Guy's Big Bite
- Hell's Kitchen
- The Invisible Man
- Kathy Griffin: My Life on the D-List
- McMillan & Wife
- Million Dollar Listing Los Angeles
- The Millionaire Matchmaker
- Pregnant in Heels
- The Rachel Zoe Project
- Tabatha Takes Over
- Unsolved Mysteries

=== Animated ===
- Arthur! and the Square Knights of the Round Table
- Back to the Jurassic
- Dinky Dog
- Drak Pack
- Khumba
- Wing Commander Academy

== Films ==
- Alpha Males Experiment
- Are You Here
- The Babymakers
- Bernie
- Blitz
- Buck Wild
- Control
- Dead Awake
- Dead Sushi
- The Elephant in the Living Room
- Elephant White
- Elsa & Fred
- Faces in the Crowd
- Fake
- High Road
- Hisss
- The Iceman
- Intruders
- Laddaland
- Life of a King
- Linklater
- The Liquidator
- Little Birds
- A Little Bit of Heaven
- Love
- Moonwalkers
- The Nocturnal
- Persecuted
- Playing Dirty
- Puncture
- Rampart
- Red Lights
- Rob the Mob
- The Runner
- Sacrifice
- Shadows and Lies
- Skin Traffik
- So Undercover
- Spiders
- Stolen
- Straight A's
- Strangerland
- Stuck in Love
- Survivor
- The Taking of Deborah Logan
- Trespass
- Trust
- The Ultimate Yogi
- Upside Down
- The Wedding Weekend
- Welcome to Me
- What Maisie Knew
- It's Alive

== Distributed lines ==
- UFC Ultimate Fighting Championship
- Video Asia
