= End Game (2006 film) =

2006 action-thriller film by Andy Cheng

- DVD cover
- Directed by: Andy Cheng
- Written by: J.C. Pollock; Andy Cheng
- Produced by: Johnny Martin; David E. Ornston; Richard Salvatore; Tierre Turner
- Starring: Cuba Gooding Jr. James Woods; Angie Harmon; Anne Archer; Burt Reynolds
- Cinematography: Chuck Cohen
- Edited by: Julia Wong
- Music by: Kenneth Burgomaster
- Production company: Millennium Films
- Distributed by: Sony Pictures Home Entertainment
- Release dates: March 22, 2006 (Australia); May 2, 2006 (United States)
- Running time: 93 minutes
- Countries: United States; Canada; Germany
- Language: English

End Game is a 2006 American action film written and directed by Andy Cheng, and starring Cuba Gooding Jr. as Secret Service agent Alex Thomas, who is shot in the hand while unsuccessfully trying to protect the President (Jack Scalia) from an assassin's bullet. Later, with the help of a persistent newspaper reporter named Kate Crawford (Angie Harmon), he uncovers a vast conspiracy behind what initially appeared to be a lone gunman. The film co-stars James Woods, Burt Reynolds, and Anne Archer. This film was originally set to be shown in cinemas by MGM in 2005, but was delayed by the takeover from Sony and eventually sent direct-to-DVD.

== Plot ==
While walking with the First Lady after exiting the Presidential motorcade, the president is shot by a man holding a camera. The president's main Secret Service agent, Alex Thomas, is grazed by the bullet that hits the president. Thomas and other Secret Service agents kill the shooter, but the president dies at the hospital.

Kate Crawford, an investigative journalist, starts asking questions about the assassination. Anyone she questions is killed. She goes to Thomas's house to tell him what is happening. As they head to his boat, Thomas sees some men hiding in the bushes. He sees a bomb on his boat, and throws Crawford into the water and dives in after her as the boat explodes. While the pair are underwater, the men move close and open fire on them. Thomas kills two of the hitmen while a third hitman drives off to inform his boss what happened. Thomas and Crawford are able to link the hitmen to a man called Jack Baldwin.

Thomas and other Secret Service members attack Baldwin's location. Baldwin escapes but is later caught by Thomas. After a meeting with General Montgomery, Thomas and Crawford become suspicious of Vaughan Stevens, Thomas's boss, who turns out to have had previous links to Baldwin. While reviewing film of the assassination, Thomas discovers that Stevens handed the assassin a gun during the president's entrance. Thomas leaves to find Stevens while Crawford stays at his house.

When Thomas arrives at Stevens's home, he finds him dead. Thomas sees a car with a female driver leaving the house. He then receives a call that Baldwin has escaped. Baldwin attacks Crawford, but Thomas arrives and kills him. Thomas arrives at the first lady's house to see the car that left Stevens's house pulling away. Thomas discovers that the first lady wanted her husband killed because he was being unfaithful to her.

A few weeks later, Crawford and Thomas have dinner. Thomas decides that protecting the dead president's reputation is more important than implicating his widow, and tells Crawford that he still does not know who wanted the president dead.

== Cast ==
- Cuba Gooding Jr. as U.S. Secret Service Agent Alex Thomas
- Angie Harmon as Kate Crawford
- James Woods as Vaughn Stevens
- Patrick Fabian as Brian Martin
- Peter Greene as Jack Baldwin
- Jack Scalia as The President
- Anne Archer as The First Lady
- David Selby as Shakey Fuller
- Burt Reynolds as General Montgomery
- Christa Campbell as Mistress

== Filming ==
Although set in Washington, D.C., End Game was actually filmed in Spokane as indicated by the end credits, and hinted at by the evergreen fir trees in the background in most outdoor scenes. The actual city of Washington appears only in aerial shots. Part of End Game was filmed on the campus of Gonzaga University and Holy Family Hospital.

== Release ==
In the first week End Game opened at #20 at rentals chart and earned $1.18 million.
