= Day of the Dead (2008 film) =

2008 film by Steve Miner

- Theatrical release poster
- Directed by: Steve Miner
- Screenplay by: Jeffrey Reddick
- Based on: Day of the Dead by George A. Romero
- Produced by: Boaz Davidson; James Dudelson; Randall Emmett; George Furla
- Starring: Mena Suvari; Nick Cannon; Michael Welch; AnnaLynne McCord; Stark Sands; Matt Rippy; Pat Kilbane; Taylor Hoover; Christa Campbell; Ving Rhames
- Cinematography: Patrick Cady
- Edited by: Nathan Easterling
- Music by: Tyler Bates
- Production companies: Millennium Films; Taurus Entertainment Company; Emmett/Furla Films
- Distributed by: First Look Studios
- Release date: April 8, 2008
- Running time: 86 minutes
- Country: United States
- Language: English
- Budget: $18 million
- Box office: $301,771

Day of the Dead is a 2008 American horror film directed by Steve Miner and written by Jeffrey Reddick. It is a remake of George A. Romero's 1985 film of the same name, the third in Romero's Dead series. The film sees a virus outbreak that causes people to turn into violent zombie-like creatures, and stars Mena Suvari, Nick Cannon, Michael Welch, AnnaLynne McCord, Stark Sands, Matt Rippy, Pat Kilbane, Taylor Hoover, Christa Campbell, and Ving Rhames.

The project was principally shot in Bulgaria, with limited shooting in Los Angeles, California.

Day of the Dead was released direct-to-video on April 8, 2008, by First Look Studios. It was panned by critics.

== Plot ==
Minors Trevor Bowman and Nina meet in an abandoned warehouse in Colorado. At the same time, military roadblocks seal the city off for a 24-hour quarantine exercise. Corporal Sarah Bowman leaves her barricade and drives with Private Bud Crain to visit her sick mother. There, Trevor and Nina reveal that the local populace were infected by an influenza-like virus and that their friend Kyle gushed blood from the nose that morning. Sarah and Bud head to Kyle's house to investigate and discover his parents' mauled corpses. She radioes Captain Rhodes about the situation and heads homeward to bring her family and Nina to the Medical Center.

As the CDC's Dr. Logan questions Sarah in the crowded hospital, the infected become catatonic and reanimate as zombies. As carnage ensues, Nina and Trevor seek refuge at the local radio station, and Captain Rhodes is mauled. Dr. Logan, Sarah and Bud rush to a storage room, but Bud inadvertently drops the car keys before entering. Sarah and Bud resolve to reach the room Captain Rhodes was mauled in through the air ducts to retrieve his Humvee keys. When they land on the floor, Private Salazar appears. During their return to the storeroom, Rhodes rises to pursue them and bites Bud's hand as he replaces the ceiling grille. The group jumps from the window into the zombie-infested parking lot. Dr. Logan deliberately pushes a woman toward a zombie and departs in a vehicle.

The remaining members set off in the Humvee. They stop at a gun store and restrain Bud with plastic wrist-ties inside the vehicle. Upon reentering, Bud has transformed. Sarah insists that he is harmless and should not get shot. Meanwhile, they hear Trevor over the radio and dash to his location. They collect the couple and attempt to exit the city but collide near the abandoned warehouse. They access an underground bunker and encounter Dr. Logan, who divulges his involvement in the government project under Dr. Engel. Engel intended to produce a bioweapon to paralyze enemy combatants by temporarily affecting their nervous system, but the virus mutated, zombifying the scientists. As the group traverses the bunker, Dr. Engel stealthily kills Logan. Zombies encircle Salazar and he sacrifices himself to enable Sarah to escape and reunite with Trevor and Nina. They find a bundle of gas cylinders and modify them into flamethrowers. While Sarah lures the zombie horde, Dr. Engel descends from the ceiling and grabs her. When Bud shoots at him, Engel decapitates him. Sarah directs the zombies to the cylinders, and they incinerate them. The group sets out in Dr. Logan's car, and as they proceed towards the distance, a zombie screams at the camera.

== Cast ==
- Mena Suvari as Corporal Sarah Cross-Bowman^{*}
- Nick Cannon as Private Salazar
- Michael Welch as Trevor Cross-Bowman^{*}
- AnnaLynne McCord as Nina
- Stark Sands as Private Bud Crain
- Matt Rippy as Dr. Logan
- Ian McNeice as D.J. Paul
- Christa Campbell as Mrs. Leitner
- Ving Rhames as Captain Kenneth Rhodes
- Hugh Skinner as Kyle
- Pat Kilbane as Dr. Engel (credited as “Scientist”)
- Taylor Hoover
- Laura Giosh as Mrs. Noble
- Callum Rory Lawton as Boy In Street

^*Sarah is referred to as Cross during the film, but she and her brother are listed as Bowman in the credits.

== Production ==
In May 2005, it was reported that Taurus Entertainment Company, Emmett/Furla Oasis, and Millennium Films would be developing a remake of Day of the Dead.

Reddick, who adapted the script from Romero's original concept, has stated that this film does not have any connection to Zack Snyder's 2004 remake of Dawn of the Dead (although Ving Rhames had also appeared in that film, but as a different character). He told ComingSoon.net: "It's going to be a separate movie...We wanted to pay homage to the original with the military and the scientists and the socially relevant stuff that George Romero always does, but we wanted to put a fresh spin on it." Variety announced the project in July 2006, and shooting ended on September 7, 2006, after six weeks in Sofia, Bulgaria. Re-shoots took place in June 2007.

== Release ==
First Look Pictures released it on DVD in the United States on April 8, 2008.

== Reception ==
The film was poorly received by both fans and critics. Rotten Tomatoes, a review aggregator, reports that 13% of 8 surveyed critics gave the film a positive review; the average rating is 2.66/10. Steve Barton of Dread Central rated it 2/5 stars and called it "dead on arrival". Barton called Cannon's performance offensively stereotypical. Buz Wallick, also writing for Dread Central, rated it 1.5/5 stars and called it "an awful film with awful special features that will hopefully fade from memory in time". Heather Seebach of Shock Till You Drop called it "cheap horror for indiscriminate genre fans" that "tiptoes on so-bad-it-is-funny territory". Brian Orndorf of DVD Talk rated it 0/5 stars and called it "a vile, pathetic, slapdash motion picture".

== See also ==
- List of zombie films
