= Snakeman (film) =

- Written by: Declan O'Brien; Allan A. Goldstein
- Story by: Kenneth M. Badish; Boaz Davidson
- Directed by: Allan A. Goldstein
- Starring: Stephen Baldwin; Jayne Heitmeyer; Larry Day; Gary Hudson; Ross McCall
- Theme music composer: Claude Foisy
- Original language: English

Production
- Producers: Kenneth M. Badish; Boaz Davidson
- Running time: 96 minutes

Original release
- Network: Syfy
- Release: April 8, 2005

Snakeman (stylized as SnakeMan), also known as The Snake King, is a Syfy original film that premiered April 8, 2005, on the Syfy channel.

== Plot ==
Anthropologists deep in the Amazon uncover the remains of a man they come to determine was approximately 300 years old when he died. This leads to a second expedition to discover the reason behind his longevity, but there is a major problem in the form of an Amazonian tribe that guards the proverbial fountain of youth and the giant, multi-headed snake they worship.

The scientists, led by Dr. Susan Elters, local amazonians, and their guide, Matt Ford, work their way through the jungle losing half the crew on the way and discover the tribe known as the Snake People. Once they find the tribe, they are held hostage and the only way they can leave peacefully is if they bring their recently discovered remains.

The scientists are able to contact the head of the expedition, who promises to bring the body back. When he and his soldiers show up, without the body, they become enemies, with the Snake People. They search for the fountain of youth, killing the Snake People along the way. They find the fountain in a cave and the final battle between the scientists and the snake takes place. The entire team of soldiers are killed and the only people left alive are Susan and Matt, who find that, they need to keep the secrets to eternal youth, with the Snake People.

== Cast ==
- Stephen Baldwin as Matt Ford
- Jayne Heitmeyer as Dr. Susan Elters
- Larry Day as Dr. Rick Gordon
- Gary Hudson as Dr. John Simon
- Ross McCall as Timothy
- Jorge Tarquini as Jonathan Rodgers
- Phil Miler as Dr. Richman (as Marcelo Gomes de Oliveira)
- Gideon Rosa as Dahar
- Caco Monteiro as Will Bahia (as Caludio de Carvalho Monteiro)
- Shelly Varod as Sil Santini
- Mike Zafra as "Rush" Fernandez
- Narcival Rubens as Tika
- Lucas Wilber Silva Laborda as Bada
- Charles Paraventi as Ronald
- Michael P. Flannigan as Jim (as Michael Flannigan)
- Sandro Lyrio as Edwardo
- Agnaldo Santos Lopez as Mase
- Caio Roderigo Chaves as Prospector
- Randolph Burlton as Snakeman

== Release ==
=== Home media ===
Snakeman was released on DVD by First Look Pictures on March 21, 2006. It was later released by Boulevard Entertainment on December 15, 2008.

== Reception ==
Dread Central panned the film, awarding it a score of 0 1/2 out of 5, writing "Snake King is one of those movies so formulaic it very easily could have been written by an automated screenwriting program. You got the good guy male lead that knows his way around these parts, you got the female lead that ends up becoming his love interest, you got the bad guys that all eventually end up getting killed one way or another, and everyone else is just snake fodder. It’s all done in such a lifeless manner that it manages to fail as either a monster movie or a jungle adventure." Popcorn Pictures similarly panned the film, rating it a score of 1/10, and calling it "a low grade straight-to-TV movie".

== See also ==
- List of killer snake films
