= Jolt (film) =

- Official release poster
- Directed by: Tanya Wexler
- Written by: Scott Wascha
- Produced by: David Bernardi; Sherryl Clark; Robert Van Norden; Les Weldon; Yariv Lerner
- Starring: Kate Beckinsale; Bobby Cannavale; Laverne Cox; Stanley Tucci; Jai Courtney
- Cinematography: Jules O'Loughlin
- Edited by: Chris Barwell; Carsten Kupanek; Michael J. Duthie
- Music by: Dominic Lewis
- Production companies: Millennium Media; Busted Shark Productions; Campbell Grobman Films; Eclectic Pictures
- Distributed by: Amazon Studios
- Release date: July 23, 2021
- Running time: 91 minutes
- Country: United States
- Language: English

Jolt is a 2021 American action comedy film directed by Tanya Wexler and written by Scott Wascha. The film stars Kate Beckinsale, Susan Sarandon, Bobby Cannavale, Laverne Cox, Stanley Tucci, and Jai Courtney. It was released on July 23, 2021, by Amazon Studios.

== Plot ==
An ex-bouncer, Lindy Lewis, suffers from intermittent explosive disorder, which is triggered by interactions with annoying people. She has been seeing a psychiatrist, Dr. Ivan Munchin, who has been attempting to treat her disorder with an electroshock vest, which is slowly becoming less effective. He advises that she try forming a relationship with someone as another path to treatment. Against her better judgement, she goes on a date with an accountant named Justin, with whom she gets on very well. Just before their next date, she discovers that he has been murdered. Frustrated by the procedural approach taken by the police, she goes on a hunt for the killer. She steals Justin's personal effects from the evidence locker and escapes from Detectives Vicars and Nevin in Justin's McLaren 600LT Spider, ending in a crash which puts Vicars in the hospital. She uses a hacker, Andy, to break into Justin's phone to discover who he had been working for, which leads her to an arms dealer, who, after interrogation, tells her that it was his boss, Gareth Fizal.

She tells the police of the information she has uncovered, and Vicars gives her Fizal's location, but Nevin tries to stop her. She escapes Nevin and travels to Fizal's office building, where the head of security, Delacroix, detains her and confiscates her vest before releasing her. Delacroix informs Fizal, who asks for Lindy to be dealt with, while Lindy goes to see her psychiatrist to be provided with another electroshock vest. While she is there, her home is boobytrapped with explosives, but she disarms them and takes them with her, setting her own explosion in her apartment to make Delacroix and Fizal believe that they have been successful.

Lindy then attempts to break into Fizal's building, but is found by Delacroix and taken to see Fizal, who admits to having had many people killed. She is again detained by Delacroix who attempts to kill her by exsanguination, but she escapes and uses Delacroix's own equipment to torture him to find out how to access Fizal's office. Lindy fights her way through security to get back to Fizal's office, where she finds that he is already dead - shot in the head by Justin, who reveals himself to be a CIA agent who had faked his death to use Lindy to kill Fizal, having paid for Munchin's research. Justin attempts to kill her by electrocuting her with her own vest, but she has become immune to its effects from overuse and uses the explosives taken from her apartment to kill Justin.

Lindy returns to Dr. Munchin, who admits that he had been doing as Justin had said. Vicars and Nevin arrive to find Lindy holding Munchin at gunpoint against the wall. Assuming that Lindy is trying to kill him, Vicars shoots her in the leg, but then they discover that she was handcuffing him to hand over to them. In a hospital, after receiving treatment, Vicars asks Lindy on a date. After leaving the hospital, Lindy returns to her burnt out apartment and is met by a mysterious woman. The woman admits to having been a superior to both Munchin and Justin and tries to convince Lindy to join her. In a mid-credits scene, Andy the hacker discovers that the keys given to her by Lindy as payment are for Justin's supercar.

== Cast ==
- Kate Beckinsale as Lindy Lewis
- Bobby Cannavale as Detective Vicars
- Laverne Cox as Detective Nevin
- Stanley Tucci as Dr. Ivan Munchin
- Jai Courtney as Justin
- David Bradley as Gareth Fizal
- Ori Pfeffer as Delacroix
- Susan Sarandon as The Woman with No Name

== Production ==
In April 2019, it was announced Kate Beckinsale had joined the cast of the film as the lead, with Tanya Wexler directing from a screenplay by Scott Wascha. In July 2019, Bobby Cannavale, Laverne Cox, Stanley Tucci and Jai Courtney joined the cast of the film.

Principal photography began in July 2019. Per the credits, filming took place in Bulgaria and the United Kingdom.

== Release ==
The film was released on July 23, 2021, on Amazon Prime Video.

== Reception ==
On Rotten Tomatoes the film holds a 40% approval rating based on 78 reviews. The site's critical consensus reads, "In spite of a crackling premise and a star who's always ready for action, Jolt never manages to deliver much more than a mild buzz". On Metacritic, the film holds a rating of 48 out of 100, based on review from 16 critics, indicating "mixed or average" reviews.

Bob Strauss of The San Francisco Chronicle gave the film 2.5 out of 5 stars writing: "While it's not always as sharp as it could be, the energy in "Jolt" never falters, and there are definitely amusing bits." Leslie Felperin of The Guardian gave the film 3 out of 5 stars writing: "Kate Beckinsale’s furious heroine is electrically entertaining". Calum Marsh of The New York Times gave the film a negative review writing: "The plot, stretched thin even at just 90 minutes, is extremely predictable, and therefore boring, and the film doesn't do enough with its high-concept shock-therapy conceit to feel fresh or novel." Tomris Laffly of RogerEbert.com also gave the film a negative review giving the film two stars writing: "An action-packed, sci-fi adjacent dark comedy that leaves a lot to be desired in its neon-soaked wake."
