= Straight A's =

- Theatrical release poster
- Directed by: James Cox
- Written by: Dave Cole
- Produced by: Jamie Adamic; René Besson; Christa Campbell; Boaz Davidson; Danny Dimbort; Lati Grobman; Avi Lernere
- Starring: Anna Paquin; Ryan Phillippe; Luke Wilson; Riley Thomas Stewart; Ursula Parker
- Cinematography: Scott Kevan
- Edited by: Priscilla Nedd-Friendly; Fernando Villena
- Music by: Joe Purdy
- Production company: Jacobson Company
- Distributed by: Millennium Entertainment
- Release dates: January 13, 2013 (Brazil); March 19, 2013 (United States)
- Running time: 88 minutes
- Country: United States
- Language: English
- Budget: $3.2 million
- Box office: $5.2 million

Straight A's is a 2013 American romantic comedy film directed by James Cox, produced by Jamie Adamic, and starring Anna Paquin, Ryan Phillippe and Luke Wilson. The film was released on January 13, 2013, in Brazil and on March 19, 2013, in the United States. It was distributed by Millennium Entertainment.

== Plot ==
Scott has been in and out of rehab programs for eight years. He is haunted by the ghost of his dead mother. She talks to him, and presses him to return home to Louisiana, to the family he turned his back on years ago. Eventually making the decision to go, he arrives on horseback, without warning, and immediately meets his niece and nephew, Gracie Anne and Charles.

As the kids tell him about their frog that passed, Scott comes face to face with Katherine, his brother's wife, and his first love. She is shocked at first, then openly hostile. He insists that his dead mother sent him to make amends.

Falling asleep in the tub prompts Katherine's anger again. She asks him to leave, and come back on Thursday when William is back. After Gracie Anne helps clean up his appearance, Scott goes to Charles's school at lunch and helps him get a girl to notice him.

Later that day, Katherine again chastises Scott, telling him that the school principal called, exaggerating Scott's visit as being more disruptive than it was. That evening, by the pool, they share a joint, and he tells her she was right to not have left with him to Texas years ago.

Scott attempts to visit his father, who has Alzheimer's, but due to his failing memory, he is run off the property with a gun. Afterwards, he asks the gardener, Carlos, to take him to a bar, and he misses another meal.

Late that night, Scott returns with a group of people he met at the bar, and they jump into the pool, waking Katherine, who kicks them out of the pool, and Scott out of the house.

When Charles does not find Scott in the house, he fears he will miss his school presentation. Upon their arrival at school, they find him already there, waiting. Charles uses the technique Scott taught him for public speaking, and it proves very effective.

Arriving home, William is back and not happy to see Scott. Katherine has organized a family lunch. Scott's father arrives, and hits Scott upon seeing him. Once seated, George's caretaker gives him part of his wife's journal to read. She calls on the family to make amends to each other.

Scott asks to be excused, stumbles into the bathroom and collapses. In the hospital, the doctor explains he is in stage 3 of brain cancer, making it clear as to why he was consuming so much Vicodin and marijuana. In his coma-like state, the family takes turns at his side. It also reveals that Charles was fathered just before he had left town, but no one noticed as there was a short gap between her dating him and William.

Charles's eulogy for Scott on Monday, less than a week after meeting him, is in three parts as Scott taught him, "He was a fire-bellied toad who took a chance and became a prince for a day."

== Cast ==
- Anna Paquin as Katherine
- Ryan Phillippe as Scott
- Luke Wilson as William
- Powers Boothe as Father
- Riley Thomas Stewart as Charles
- Ursula Parker as Gracie
- Tess Harper as Mother
- Amparo Garcia-Crow as Louisa
- Josh Meyers as Jason
- Christa Campbell as Dana
- Whitney Able as Lizzy
- Liz Mikel as Nurse Viola
