= The Iceman (film) =

2013 American film directed by Ariel Vromen

- Theatrical release poster
- Directed by: Ariel Vromen
- Screenplay by: Ariel Vromen; Morgan Land
- Based on: The Iceman: The True Story of a Cold-Blooded Killer by Anthony Bruno
- Produced by: Ariel Vromen; Ehud Bleiberg; Avi Lerner
- Starring: Michael Shannon; Winona Ryder; James Franco; Ray Liotta; Chris Evans; David Schwimmer; Robert Davi; Danny Abeckaser
- Cinematography: Bobby Bukowski
- Edited by: Danny Rafic
- Music by: Haim Mazar
- Production companies: Bleiberg Entertainment; Rabbit Bandini Productions
- Distributed by: Millennium Entertainment
- Release dates: August 30, 2012 (Venice); May 3, 2013 (United States)
- Running time: 106 minutes
- Country: United States
- Language: English
- Budget: $13.5 million
- Box office: $4.6 million

The Iceman is a 2012 American biographical crime film loosely based on hitman Richard Kuklinski. The film was directed by Ariel Vromen and stars Michael Shannon as Kuklinski, with Winona Ryder, Chris Evans, James Franco, and Ray Liotta in supporting roles.

The film premiered at the Venice International Film Festival in August 2012 and was theatrically released in the United States on May 3, 2013. It received lukewarm reviews from critics and was a box-office failure.

== Plot ==
When a man insults Richard Kuklinski's girlfriend during a game of pool, he follows the man to his car and murders him by slashing his throat. Kuklinski marries Deborah in 1964 and the couple have two daughters. Kuklinski presents himself to everyone as a normal and successful working man, but he has a dark, violent side that he hides. As a boy he and his younger brother were the subject of brutal beatings from their immigrant Polish father, shaping the boys into emotionally disturbed, sadistic young men. His brother is serving a life sentence in prison for raping and murdering a 12-year old girl.

Kuklinski works dubbing pornographic films, but tells his wife he dubs cartoons. The mob-backed company he works for is shut down by Roy DeMeo, a powerful New York City gangster. DeMeo tests Kuklinski by having him kill a homeless man, then hires him as an enforcer and contract killer. In 1975, Kuklinski moves his family into a nice suburban home and starts telling people he works at a currency trading company. He is ordered to kill a man who betrayed DeMeo, but finds a teenage girl in the closet afterwards. Freezy, a freelance hitman also hired by DeMeo, almost kills her, but is stopped by Kuklinski. DeMeo, already involved in a dispute with the Cali Cartel, is furious when he learns what happened and decommissions Kuklinski indefinitely. Needing money, he makes a deal to carry out murders contracted to Freezy in return for half the bounties.

Kuklinski's home life is beginning to unravel. He starts becoming incapable of hiding his inner rage and shows bursts of anger towards his wife and strangers. DeMeo's boss Leo Merks hires Freezy to kill one of DeMeo's associates, which Kuklinski does by poisoning him with cyanide. DeMeo finds out about the hits Kuklinski has been doing behind his back and threatens to kill his family if they ever cross paths again. Kuklinski then goes to Leo Merks to collect the bounty money, but Leo is furious that the job was not untraceable. He refuses to pay anything, prompting Kuklinski to shoot him dead. Kuklinski's daughter is hospitalized after a hit-and-run by DeMeo. Both Kuklinski and Freezy have to go on the run to escape DeMeo, but Freezy insists they kill each others' families to prevent them from talking to the police. When Freezy reveals that he already knows Kuklinski's address, Kuklinski kills him.

Following an undercover sting operation, Kuklinski is arrested in 1986. His wife and kids had never suspected him of being a killer. Kuklinski admits to having committed over 100 murders, both for personal reasons and for profit, in his 22-year career. After being sentenced to two life terms in prison, he never sees his wife and daughters again. As the movie ends, Kuklinski's only regret is hurting his family through the crimes he committed. In 2006, he dies in a prison hospital, from a rare inflammatory disease; the film's closing intertitles indicate that foul play was suspected in his death as he was scheduled to testify at the trial of a Gambino family underboss.

== Cast ==
- Michael Shannon as Richard Kuklinski
- Winona Ryder as Deborah Kuklinski (based on Barbara Kuklinski)
- Chris Evans as Robert Pronge aka "Mr. Freezy" (based on Robert "Mister Softee" Prongay)
- Ray Liotta as Roy DeMeo
- James Franco as Marty Freeman
- David Schwimmer as Josh Rosenthal (based on Chris Rosenberg)
- Stephen Dorff as Joseph Kuklinski
- Erin Cummings as Ellen
- Robert Davi as Leo Merks (based on Anthony Gaggi)
- Weronika Rosati as Livi
- John Ventimiglia as Mickey Scicoli
- Christa Campbell as Adele
- McKaley Miller as Anabel Kuklinski
- Danny A. Abeckaser as Dino Lapron
- Ryan O'Nan as Terry Franzo (based on George Malliband)
- Eduardo Yanez as Dominick Provenzano
- Vincent Fuentes as J.C.
- Ashlynn Ross as Alex
- Steven Hinckley as Prison Guard

== Production ==
Filming took place in Los Angeles, California, New York City and Shreveport, Louisiana. Shannon's portrayal of Kuklinski includes the authentic voice Kuklinski had, as evidenced by his interviews with HBO in their 1993 documentary Conversations with a Killer.

== Release ==
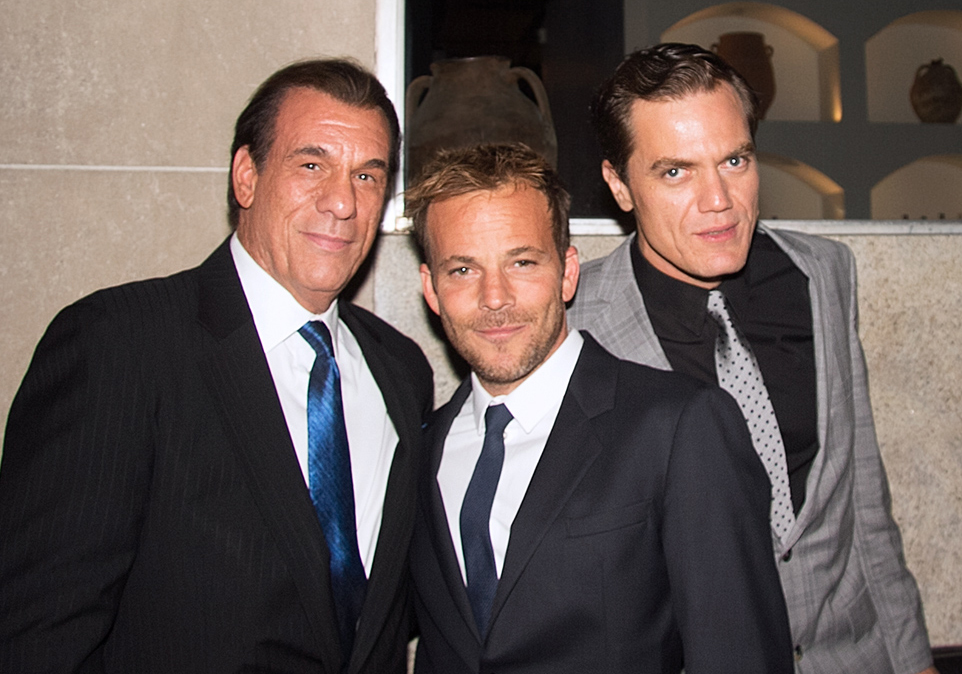
Davi, Dorff, and Shannon promoting the film at the 2012 Toronto International Film Festival

The Iceman screened out of competition at the 69th Venice International Film Festival in August 2012. The film screened at the 2012 Toronto International Film Festival in September that year. It was released in the United States on May 3, 2013. The film made $4.5 million during its theatrical run.

== Critical reception ==
On the review aggregator website Rotten Tomatoes, 67% of 122 critics' reviews are positive. The website's consensus reads: "While it deserved stronger direction and a more fully realized script, Michael Shannon's riveting performance in the title role is more than enough to make The Iceman recommended viewing."Metacritic, which uses a weighted average, assigned the film a score of 60 out of 100, based on 28 critics, indicating "mixed or average" reviews.

Stephen Holden of The New York Times wrote that while the film is not "a great crime movie... it is an indelible film that clinches Mr. Shannon's status as a major screen actor." Tomas Hachard of Slant Magazine gave the film 1.5 out of 4 stars. Meanwhile, Ben Kenigsberg of The A.V. Club gave the film a C+ rating. David Rooney of The Hollywood Reporter noted that "the film's chief asset is without question its performances." Peter Bradshaw of The Guardian gave the film 3 out of 5 stars, describing it as "Zodiac meets Goodfellas". Metro also gave it 3 out of 5 stars. Michael Phillips of Chicago Tribune gave it 3 out of 4 stars, commenting that the film is "sleek, purposeful and extremely well acted". Oliver Lyttelton gave the film a C rating. Chris Nashawaty of Entertainment Weekly gave the film a B− rating. Betsy Sharkey of Los Angeles Times criticized the film: "The great failing of The Iceman is not in giving us a monster, but in not making us care", she wrote. Jason Gorber of Twitch Film wrote: "Like a stiff mixed drink that doesn't live up to the quality of its ingredients, The Iceman proves to be an unpalatable, underwhelming crime drama."
