= Arnt (given name) =

Male given name

- Gender: Male
- Name day: 1 December

Origin
- Origin: Old Norse
- Meaning: eagle
- Region of origin: Scandinavia

Other names
- Related names: Arnold, Are, Arne, Ådne

Arnt is a Scandinavian masculine given name, predominantly found in Norway. It is derived from either Old Norse, or German and is either a short form of other names beginning with Arn-, meaning eagle, or a shortened form of Arnold, meaning "eagle" and "ruler." People bearing the name Arnt include:

- Arnt Aamodt (1871–1936), Norwegian trade unionist
- Arnt Erik Dale (born 1960), Norwegian alpine skier
- Arnt Dolven (1892–1954), Norwegian agronomist and politician
- Arnt Eliassen (1915–2000), Norwegian meteorologist
- Arnt Erickson (1866–1932), Norwegian-born American businessman and politician
- Arnt Førland (born 1964), Norwegian motorcycle speedway rider
- Arnt Gudleik Hagen (1928–2007), Norwegian politician
- Arnt Haugen (1928–1988), Norwegian accordionist and music journalist
- Arnt Kortgaard (born 1957), Norwegian footballer
- Arnt J. Mørland (1888–1957), Norwegian ship-owner, World War II resistance member, and politician
- Arnt J. C. Mørland (1921–1994), Norwegian ship-owner
- Arnt Ferdinand Moss (1880–1964), Norwegian accountant and politician
- Arnt Njargel (1901–1985), Norwegian politician
- Arnt O. Rhea (1852–1937), Norwegian-born American politician, businessman, and educator
- Arnt Rindal (1938–2015), Norwegian diplomat
- Arnt Simensen (1899–1947), Norwegian footballer
- Arnt Severin Ulstrup (1862–1922), Norwegian physician and politician
- Arnt Arntsen Wang (1791–1845), Norwegian politician
