= Richard Cottingham =

American serial killer (born 1946)

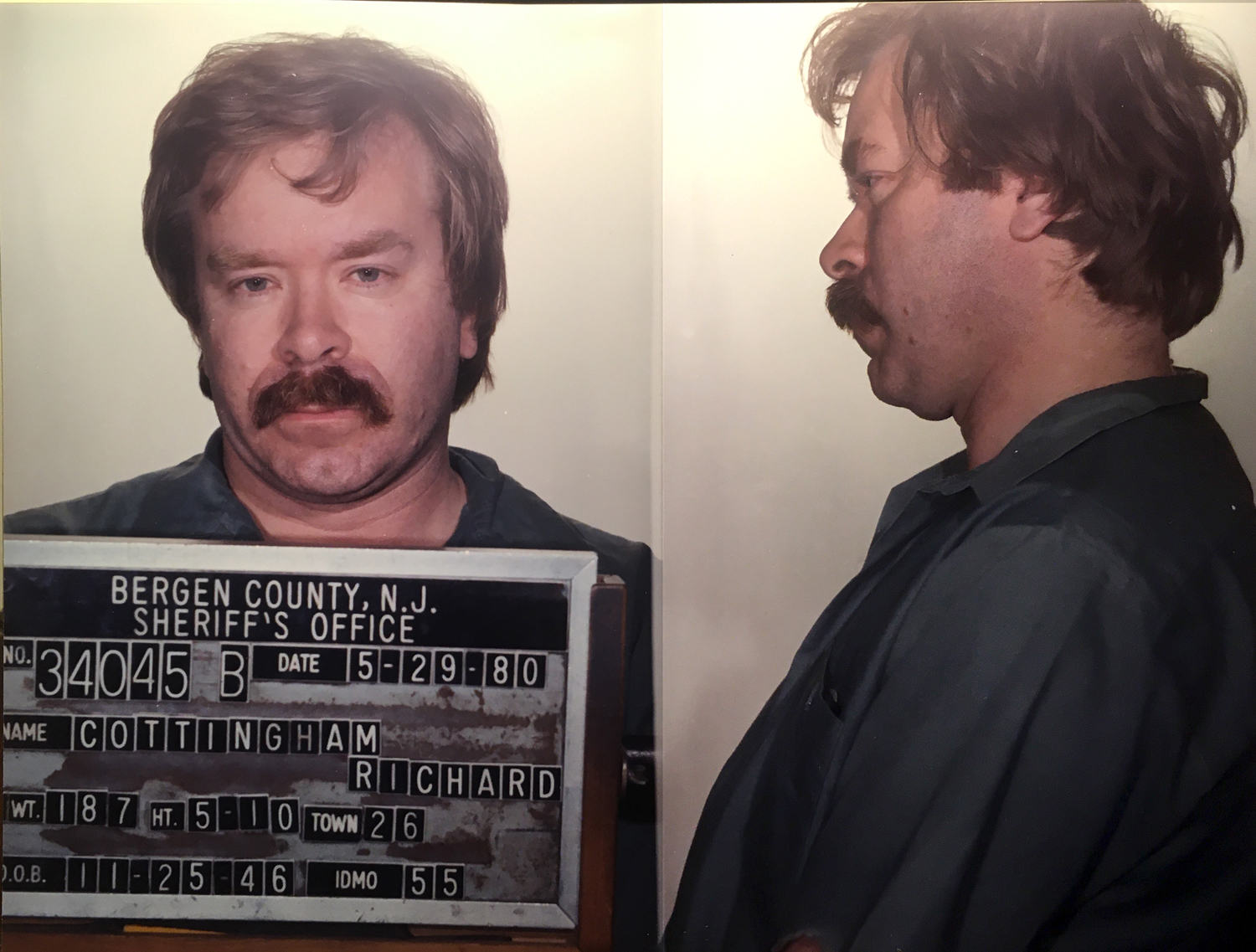
- Cottingham's May 1980 mugshot
- Born: Richard Francis Cottingham; November 25, 1946 (age 79); New York City, U.S.
- Other names: Torso Killer; Times Square Ripper; The Times Square Killer; The Bergen Strangler
- Occupation: Computer operator
- Spouse: Janet Cottingham (m. 1970; div. 1981)
- Children: 3
- Status: Incarcerated at South Woods State Prison, Bridgeton, New Jersey, U.S.
- Convictions: New Jersey; Murder (5 counts); New York; Second degree murder (4 counts)
- Penalty: Life imprisonment (both states)

Details
- Victims: 20+
- Span of crimes: 1965–1980
- Country: United States
- States: New York; New Jersey
- Date apprehended: May 22, 1980

Richard Francis Cottingham (born November 25, 1946) is an American serial killer who committed ten murders in New York State between 1972 and 1980, plus a further ten murders in New Jersey between 1965 and 1980. He was nicknamed by media as the Torso Killer and the Times Square Ripper, since some of the murders he was convicted of included acts of mutilation and dismemberment.

Cottingham's confirmed killings resulted in nine convictions and a further eleven confessions under non-prosecution agreements, leading to him serving multiple life sentences in New Jersey prisons. In 2009, decades after his first murder convictions, Cottingham claimed that he had committed at least eighty "perfect murders" of women in various regions of the United States.

== Early life and criminal history ==
=== Background and career ===
Richard Cottingham was born on November 25, 1946, in the Mott Haven neighborhood of the Bronx in New York City, the first of four children. In 1948, his family moved to Dumont, New Jersey, then twelve miles north to River Vale in 1956. Here Cottingham began his fascination with bondage pornography, later stating, "The whole idea of bondage had aroused and fascinated me since I was very young."

According to New York City-based writer and reporter, Adam Janos, in A&E Crime + Investigation — How to Explain Serial Killers Who Come from Good Homes

There was little from Cottingham's childhood that points to homicidal rage. Born in the Bronx, Cottingham's family moved to the suburban town of River Vale, New Jersey, when he was a young boy.

Historian Peter Vronsky, who is currently writing a biography on Cottingham and has spent more than 50 hours interviewing the prisoner, says he's uncovered nothing in the murderer's youth that points easily to a life of extreme violence.

His childhood was "absolutely idyllic," Vronsky says. "His father was [a] vice president [at] Metropolitan Life Insurance in New York City. Three younger sisters who absolutely adored him—all well-adjusted, no reports of family dysfunction. A mom who was a homemaker housewife. Catholic parochial schools."

Vronsky said that over the course of several interviews he's asked Cottingham several times if he suffered any kind of abuse: sexual, psychological or otherwise. Cottingham, he says, always flatly refuses, and sometimes even jokes around by saying that Vronsky will have to make up a story of abuse at the hands of the priests who taught him.

One potential explanation, Vronsky says, is brain damage: Cottingham was hit by a car as a four year old and suffered brain damage to his frontal lobe—an area of the brain associated with the desire to commit acts of aggression.

Cottingham had a close relationship with his mother growing up but reportedly had difficulty making friends as a teenager. In 1964 he graduated from Pascack Valley High School in Hillsdale, New Jersey. His graduation yearbook stated that he was a member of the school's cross country and track team.

After graduation, Cottingham found a job at the Metropolitan Life Insurance Company, where his father was a vice president. He began his employment in the mail room at the firm's Manhattan headquarters, eventually becoming a mainframe computer operator upon taking computer courses.

In October 1966, Cottingham became a computer operator for the Blue Cross Blue Shield Association, continuing in this occupation until his 1980 arrest. At Blue Cross, Cottingham worked in an office with Rodney Alcala, a fugitive child molester and serial killer who lived in New York under the alias "John Berger." Neither man claimed to have been aware of the other, nor is there any evidence they were familiar with each other prior to their respective arrests.

On May 3, 1970, Cottingham was married at Our Lady of Lourdes Church in Queens Village, Queens. He had three children, two boys and a girl with his wife. In April 1978, Cottingham's wife filed for divorce on the grounds of "abandonment" and "mental cruelty." She withdrew the petition upon his arrest in May 1980, then completed the divorce after his 1981 conviction.

=== Early arrests ===
Cottingham was arrested on several lesser charges throughout his killing spree. Police were not aware of his murders at the time, nor were they aware that a serial killer was active in the New York metropolitan area. On October 3, 1969, Cottingham was charged with and convicted of drunk driving in New York City and was fined $50. On August 21, 1972, he was charged with and convicted of shoplifting at a Stern's department store in Paramus, New Jersey, and was sentenced to pay a $50 fine or ten days in jail.

On September 4, 1973, Cottingham was arrested in New York City for robbery, oral sodomy and sexual abuse on the complaint of a prostitute and her pimp. Neither complainant appeared in further proceedings, however, and the case was dismissed. On March 12, 1974, Cottingham was arrested in New York City for robbery and unlawful imprisonment on the complaint of another prostitute. Once again, the victim did not appear in further proceedings and the case was dismissed.

=== Final arrest and charges ===
In the early morning hours of May 22, 1980, Cottingham picked up 18-year-old prostitute Leslie Ann O'Dell, who was soliciting on the corner of Lexington Avenue and 25th Street in Manhattan. The pair checked into a Quality Inn in Hasbrouck Heights, New Jersey, at Room 117. O'Dell rolled onto her stomach when Cottingham offered a massage, only for Cottingham to draw a knife and put it to her throat as he snapped a pair of handcuffs on her wrists. He proceeded to torture her, nearly biting off one of her nipples. O'Dell later testified that he said, "You have to take it. The other girls did, you have to take it, too. You're a whore and you have to be punished."

At one point, O'Dell reached under the bed for a fake gun that Cottingham had threatened her with, thinking it was real, and attempted to shoot him. When it did not fire, Cottingham came at her with the knife. She cried: "Oh, God, no!" Her screams brought motel employees to the room, and they summoned police. Cottingham was arrested in the hallway at gunpoint. A leather gag, two slave collars, a switchblade knife, replica pistols and a stockpile of prescription pills were found in his possession upon arrest.

The charges listed in Cottingham's subsequent indictment included kidnapping, attempted murder, aggravated assault, aggravated assault with deadly weapon, aggravated sexual assault while armed (rape), aggravated sexual assault while armed (sodomy), aggravated sexual assault while armed (fellatio), possession of a weapon (switchblade knife) and possession of controlled substances (secobarbital, amobarbital and diazepam).

In April 1978, after his wife had initiated divorce proceedings, Cottingham kept a locked room in a basement apartment of the house in which they lived in Lodi, New Jersey. Upon searching both the room and the trunk of his car following the 1980 arrest, police found personal effects which they traced to several of his victims.

=== Assaults ===
During Cottingham's 1981 trial, three additional surviving abduction-rape victims testified in court along with O'Dell, claiming that they had also been sexually abused and tortured by the defendant. Two of the victims (Susan Geiger and Karen Schilt) identified Cottingham in a police line-up. He was ultimately convicted in three of the cases (Schilt, Geiger and O'Dell) and acquitted in one (Weisenfeld).

- At 9 p.m. on March 22, 1978, 22-year-old pregnant waitress Karen Schilt met Cottingham on the way back to her apartment after exiting a bar on Third Avenue. Cottingham forced Schilt to ingest sleeping pills and transported her to New Jersey via Route 80, where he proceeded to sexually assault her. The following morning, near Cottingham's previous residence at the Ledgewood Terrace Apartments, a patrolman discovered Schilt in a sewer outlet with her breasts and genitalia exposed.
- On the night of October 10, 1978, Cottingham approached and propositioned 19-year-old prostitute Susan Geiger between Broadway and Seventh Avenue on West 47th Street. Although Geiger informed Cottingham that she had reservations for the remainder of the evening, she left him her contact information at the Alpine Hotel. The following evening, Cottingham called Geiger and asked her out for a date at midnight. After picking her up in his vehicle, he plied her with a number of drugged drinks. Geiger would later awaken covered in her own blood in Room 28 of the Airport Motel in South Hackensack, New Jersey. She had been tortured by Cottingham, who had injured her face, breasts, vagina and rectum. In addition, he had beaten her multiple times with a garden hose and torn out her gold earrings.
- On May 12, 1980, prostitute Pamela Weisenfeld was found beaten in a parking lot in Teaneck, New Jersey. According to police and medical reports, her attacker had bit her multiple times. After meeting Cottingham, Weisenfeld was drugged and brutally beaten, suffering several injuries all over her body.

== Murders ==
Cottingham claims to have started killing as an adolescent and to have killed as many as 100 women. He often sought sex workers in their late-teens to mid-twenties and has been linked to killings in Florida, Pennsylvania and Maryland in addition to Connecticut, New York, and New Jersey. Cottingham would approach his victims in bars, drug them, take them to a remote location and would bind, gag, torture and stab them before killing them by strangulation or asphyxiation. He would then take trophies such as jewelry and other personal items from the victims.

=== New Jersey trials ===
Over the course of two separate New Jersey trials in 1981, and 1982, Cottingham was convicted in three non-fatal assaults (Schilt, Geiger and O'Dell) and the murders of two women (Maryann Carr and Valerie Street) which occurred in Hasbrouck Heights.

- At approximately 7:00 a.m. on the morning of December 16, 1977, the body of 26-year-old X-ray technician Maryann "Marzi" Carr was found between a parked van and a chain-link fence in Little Ferry, New Jersey. She was still wearing her white nurse's uniform, but her shoes were missing. Carr was last seen on December 15 in the parking lot of the Ledgewood Terrance Apartments, from where he kidnapped her and transported her to the Hasbrouck Heights Quality Inn. Once inside, Cottingham beat, bit, slashed and raped Carr before strangling her with a ligature. Afterward he dumped her body in the parking lot of the Quality Inn, not far from the apartment complex. Carr exhibited handcuff-related bruises on her wrists and ankles, as well as remnants of adhesive tape on her mouth. Cottingham was convicted of her murder on October 12, 1982.
- On May 5, 1980, the body of 19-year-old prostitute Valerie Ann Street was found by a motel worker at the Hasbrouck Heights Quality Inn. Using an alias, Street checked into Room 122 with Cottingham, who killed her and stuffed her body under the bed for housekeeping to find. Investigators discovered Street handcuffed and with two ligature marks on her throat. They also determined that she had been gagged with white adhesive tape. Street's body had bite marks on her breasts, body and head, in addition to minor knife incisions on her breasts. One fingerprint belonging to Cottingham was recovered from the ratchet mechanism of the handcuffs left behind on Street. Cottingham was convicted of her murder on June 12, 1981.

=== New York trial ===
In a single 1984 trial, Cottingham was convicted in the deaths of three additional women which occurred in New York City between 1979 and 1980. He was convicted of their murders on July 9, 1984.

- At around 9 a.m. on December 2, 1979, staff at the Travel Lodge Motor Inn made a call to the New York City Fire Department after significant smoke was observed inside Room 417. A "do not disturb" sign was hanging from the door latch of the room, which had been rented by "Carl Wilson" since November 29. Firefighters discovered two naked female bodies on two separate beds. Prior to their deaths, the women were brutalized, and their murderer burned their bodies. Both women's hands had been severed, and the killer had also beheaded them. The missing body parts were never found. A later autopsy revealed that both women had been tortured and sexually assaulted while still alive for several days. 22-year-old Deedeh Goodarzi, an Iranian immigrant who worked as a prostitute, was identified shortly afterward. The other victim remains unidentified and is estimated to be aged between 16 and 22. She is referred to as "Manhattan Jane Doe." In a 2009 interview, Cottingham admitted to the murders and claimed that he severed the heads and hands of the victims to prevent their identification, as he was acquainted with Goodarzi and had been seen with her in a bar the night before.
- 25-year-old Mary Ann Jean Reyner was discovered on May 15, 1980, at the Seville Hotel in New York City. Investigators discovered that her attacker had cut her throat and removed both of her breasts, which were left on the headboard of the bed. Reyner's body had also been set on fire as part of the perpetrator's attempt to destroy evidence.

=== Anzilotti investigations ===
Cottingham insisted for decades that he had been "framed" until 2009, when he admitted that he had actually perpetrated the five homicides for which he had been convicted. In 2000, a detective in the Bergen County Prosecutor's Office (BCPO), Robert Anzilotti, was tasked with reviewing a series of cold cases from the 1960s and 1970s. Anzilotti came to believe that Cottingham, "between his history and the suspicions of detectives that came before me," could be responsible for one or more of those crimes and so began to interview Cottingham from 2003 onwards. Cottingham pleaded guilty to a 1967 murder in 2010, then confessed to murdering three teenage girls in exchange for immunity from prosecution in 2014.

The BCPO "exceptionally closed" the three murders with agreement from the victims' families but did not disclose the developments for several years to keep Cottingham talking about other cases. In December 2019, forensic historian and author Peter Vronsky, on the eve of publishing the revelation in his second edition of Serial Killers: The Method and Madness of Monsters, publicized the confessions with the BCPO's co-operation. Anzilotti and the BCPO subsequently confirmed the "exceptional closures" of the three murders.

In April 2021, Cottingham confessed to an unsolved 1974 double-homicide in Montvale, one of New Jersey's most notorious cold cases. The confession was extracted by Anzilotti weeks before his retirement and was facilitated by both Vronsky and Jennifer Weiss, the daughter of victim Deedeh Goodarzi. Vronsky and Weiss had been meeting with Cottingham in prison since the spring of 2017, counselling him to make the confession. In March 2023, Anzilotti elicited another confession from Cottingham: the murder of a 17-year-old who vanished in 1967.

- At 9 p.m. on January 24, 1967, 17-year-old Mary Ann Della Sala disappeared at the end of her shift at a Shop-Rite store at 330 Essex Street in Hackensack, New Jersey. Her body was found three months later on April 20 in the Passaic River in Hawthorne. She had been strangled. Police concluded that she was killed elsewhere and then thrown into the river. There was no sign of sexual assault.
- On October 30, 1967, the bound and naked body of 29-year-old Nancy "Bubby" Schiava Vogel, a married mother of two, was found in her automobile in Ridgefield Park, New Jersey. Vogel, who was acquainted with Cottingham, had last been seen three days earlier in Little Ferry, when she left home to play bingo with friends at a local church. Instead, Vogel chose to do her shopping in a mall in Bergen County, where she was kidnapped by Cottingham. He proceeded to strangle her in a field in Montvale. Cottingham was convicted of her murder on August 25, 2010.
- On July 17, 1968, 13-year-old Jacalyn Leah "Jackie" Harp vanished in Midland Park, New Jersey, after she failed to come home from band rehearsal at her school. The next morning, on July 18, her body was discovered at Goffle Brook; she had been beaten about the face and strangled with the leather strap from her flag sling. Police believed the attack was sexually motivated, despite the fact that she had not been raped, since her clothes were in "disarray." Cottingham claimed that he attempted to persuade Harp to get into his car, but she resisted. He then drove his car in front of Harp, stopped and walked over to her. Cottingham caught up to Harp despite her attempts to flee, dragged her into a cluster of bushes and killed her.
- On April 7, 1969, 18-year-old Irene Blase was reported missing. The following day, she was discovered face-down in four feet of water in Saddle River, New Jersey, strangled with the chain from a crucifix she was wearing. Cottingham confessed that he saw Blase shopping in Hackensack and convinced her to join him for a drink. Taking a cab to another location, Cottingham and Blase spent time together after which Cottingham offered to take Blase back to the bus station. He then drove Blase to a remote location against her will before raping and killing her.

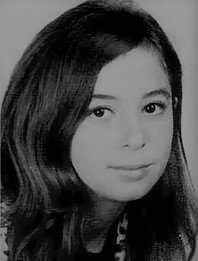
Denise Falasca

- On July 13, 1969, at approximately 8:00 p.m., 15-year-old Denise Falasca left her residence on Bergenline Avenue in Closter, New Jersey, on her way to meet friends in Westwood. At 11:00 p.m. Falasca was scheduled to return home, but she never arrived. At around 9:00 p.m., witnesses claimed to have seen Falasca heading along Old Hook Road in Emerson in the direction of Westwood. Her body was found on the side of Westminster Place in Saddle Brook on July 14. Falasca, according to Cottingham, was walking down the side of the road in Emerson when he pulled up next to her and offered her a ride. Shortly after, he drove to the parking lot of his former school, where he forced Falasca to perform oral sex on him. Dissatisfied with the act, Cottingham murdered her.
- On August 9, 1974, 16-year-old Lorraine Marie Kelly and 17-year-old Mary Ann Pryor left North Bergen, New Jersey, with plans to go shopping at the Garden State Plaza in Paramus. Kelly's boyfriend dropped the two off at a bus stop on Broad Street in Ridgefield, where they planned to hitchhike to the shopping center in Paramus. Their bodies were found on August 14 in a wooded location close to the Ridgemont Gardens complex in Montvale. They were naked and bound to one another at the wrists and ankles while lying face-down next to each other. Both had been beaten and raped; the ligature marks on their necks suggested that they had likely been strangled as well. Both also had cigarette burns on their flesh. Cottingham was convicted of both murders on April 27, 2021. In court he admitted to kidnapping the girls, raping them both in a motel room and drowning them in the bathtub.

=== 2022 developments ===
On August 26, 2022, with a non-prosecution agreement, officials in Rockland County, New York, corroborated and accepted Cottingham's confession to the 1970 murder of 26-year-old Lorraine McGraw. Cottingham's additional confession to a 1974 murder was discounted by Rockland County police. In June 2022, Cottingham was arraigned from his prison hospital bed for the 1968 murder of Diane Cusick. Authorities believed it to be, thus far, the oldest criminal case to be solved and prosecuted by direct DNA evidence. He pleaded guilty in a court appearance on December 5, and also officially admitted killing four other women during 1972 and 1973 in Long Island, New York: Mary Beth Heinz, Laverne Moye, Sheila Heiman and Maria Emerita Rosado Nieves.

- Diane Martin Cusick (23), a Long Island dance teacher, was found dead on February 16, 1968, in the back seat of her car, a 1961 Plymouth Valiant, outside the Green Acres Mall in Valley Stream, New York, with adhesive tape around her mouth and neck. She had been beaten, raped and strangled. Her hands also bore defensive wounds. DNA from semen discovered at the crime scene was extracted, and it matched a sample retrieved from Cottingham. The Green Acres Mall stood near a drive-in theater that Cottingham frequented. Authorities believe Cottingham approached Cusick while pretending to be a mall security guard.
- On March 1, 1970, a group of hikers came across a young woman's naked body in the woods to the west of Tweed Boulevard in South Nyack, New York. The victim had marks around her neck indicating that she had been strangled. The FBI identified the decedent as Lorraine Montalvo McGraw (26), who lived in Long Island and had been missing since February 27. McGraw had a history of drug and prostitution offenses; many of them were listed under false names. On August 26, 2022, Cottingham confessed to killing McGraw.
- The body of Mary Beth Heinz (21) was discovered on May 10, 1972, near a creek in Rockville Centre, New York. She had cuts on her face and neck from being strangled. Heinz, who experienced grand mal seizures and had been diagnosed with epilepsy, vanished on May 5 as she boarded a bus to travel to a nearby dance. Cottingham claimed to have thrown her body from Rockville Center's Peninsula Boulevard Bridge.
- Laverne Moye (23) of St. Albans, Queens, was discovered in a Rockville Centre creek on July 20, 1972. She had been killed by strangulation. Cottingham claimed that he had thrown her body off the same bridge where he had previously dumped Heinz's body.
- Sheila Heiman (33) was found bludgeoned and stabbed to death in her home in North Woodmere, New York on July 20, 1973. When her husband returned after a shopping errand that morning, he discovered her dead in the master bathroom. None of the rooms outside of the bathroom showed evidence of a struggle and none of Heiman's neighbours reported anything strange around the time of her death.
- Eighteen-year-old Maria Emerita Rosado Nieves, a native of Puerto Rico, was found dead in Wantagh, New York on December 27, 1973. She was found strangled to death in a weeded area close to a bus stop on Ocean Parkway. She was discovered by park maintenance personnel wrapped in a grey blanket and covered in plastic bags.
- On October 7, 1974, fifteen-year-old Lisa Thomas left her home and walked to the Nanuet Mall at 3:30 p.m., intending to buy a blouse. About 700 feet from their Nanuet, New York home, Thomas' body was found by her father the following morning in the woods behind the mall. Thomas was blindfolded with a crimson rag that she had in her purse, and her head had been bashed in. Thomas had not been sexually assaulted. On August 26, 2022, Cottingham admitted to her murder. Despite his confession, the investigation into her death is still ongoing, and he has not been charged with the crime.

=== Later confession ===
On December 22, 2025, Cottingham confessed to the 1965 murder of 18-year-old Alys Eberhardt, who was killed in Fair Lawn, New Jersey. The city's police chief said he will not face charges for that case and thus closed it following the confession.

== In media ==
Cottingham's case has been discussed in several books and documentaries on serial killers. Two focused entirely on him: Rod Leith's The Prostitute Murders: The People vs. Richard Cottingham (Lyle Stuart Inc., 1983) and Crime Scene: The Times Square Killer (Netflix, 2021). He was also featured in a two-hour special episode of People Magazine Investigates entitled “The Times Square Killer” (Investigation Discovery, 2023). Cottingham's subsequent prison confessions to cold case murders were the focus of the two-part The Torso Killer Confessions (Hulu, 2023). Denise Falasca's murder is the focus of the podcast "Denise Didn't Come Home." (2024). The victims' stories are honored in the podcast "Method & Madness"(2026).

== See also ==
- List of serial killers in the United States
- List of serial killers by number of victims
