= Aamodt =

Aamodt is a Norwegian surname. Notable people with the surname include:

- Aleksander Aamodt Kilde (born 1992), Norwegian alpine ski racer
- Arnt Aamodt (1871–1936), Norwegian trade unionist
- Bjørn Aamodt (1944–2006), Norwegian poet
- Christen Thorn Aamodt (1770–1836), Norwegian priest
- Finn Aamodt (born 1952), Norwegian sports coach
- Henning Bue Aamodt, Norwegian footballer
- Kjetil André Aamodt (born 1971), Norwegian skier
- Michael Sevald Aamodt (1784–1859), Norwegian politician
- Mike Aamodt (born 1957), American psychologist
- Ragnhild Aamodt, Norwegian handball player
- Rannveig Aamodt, Norwegian rock climber
- Wyatt Aamodt (born 1997), American ice hockey player
