= Dolven =

Dolven is a surname. Notable people with the surname include:

- A. K. Dolven (born 1953), Norwegian artist
- Arnt Dolven (1892–1954), Norwegian agronomist and politician
- Jeff Dolven (fl. 2001), American academic and poet
