= Arnt =

ARNT may refer to:

- Arnt (given name), a masculine given name
- Aryl hydrocarbon receptor nuclear translocator, a human gene
- Lipid IVA 4-amino-4-deoxy-L-arabinosyltransferase, an enzyme class
