= Female Serial Killers: How and Why Women Become Monsters =

True crime book by Peter Vronsky

- Author: Peter Vronsky
- Language: English
- Genre: True crime, history
- Publisher: Berkley Books Penguin Group
- Publication date: 2007
- English publication date: 2007
- Pages: 496
- ISBN: 0425213900
- OCLC: 123390943

Female Serial Killers: How and Why Women Become Monsters is a non-fiction true crime history by Peter Vronsky, a criminal justice historian. It surveys the history of female serial killers and female-perpetrated serial homicide and its culture, psychopathology, and investigation from the Roman Empire to the mid 2000s.

The book describes historical cases of female-perpetrated serial murder from early recorded instances in ancient Rome to medieval and Renaissance Europe and Victorian Britain and its rise and escalation in the United States and the world in the postmodern era. Vronsky's central contention is that female serial killers, while exhibiting different forensic 'signatures' from male counterparts, inevitably kill for the same reasons that male offenders do: for power and control. The major difference, according to Vronsky, between female and male serial killers is that women (unless partnered with a male offender) tend not to sexually assault or physically mutilate their victims.

Vronsky cites statistics indicating that nearly one in six (16 percent) of serial killers apprehended in the United States since 1820 was a female, either acting alone or as a partner of a male or female offender. Vronsky argues that, contrary to popular belief, female serial killers prefer to murder their male intimates or family members, while recent data indicate that currently female serial killers marginally prefer strangers as victims and that historically in the United States, 53 percent of female serial killers had murdered at least one adult female, and 32 percent at least one female child.
