= Death of Dave Walker =

2014 suspicious death of Canadian writer

Dave Walker
- Born: David Walker; April 7, 1955; Edmonton, Alberta
- Died: February 14, 2014 (aged 58)
- Education: MA in augmented reality
- Alma mater: York University, Toronto
- Occupations: Author, photo-journalist, filmmaker
- Writing career
- Genres: journalism, non-fiction
- Subjects: Cambodia, Thailand
- Notable work: Hello My Big Big Honey!: Love Letters To Bangkok Bar Girls And Their Interviews (1998)
- Website: www.davewalkercase.com

Dave Walker was a Canadian writer, filmmaker and photo-journalist who died under mysterious circumstances in 2014 in Cambodia.

== Biography ==
Dave Walker was born in Edmonton, Canada on April 7, 1955.

After graduating high school, Walker served briefly as a Toronto Police constable and later joined the British Army serving in Belfast, Northern Ireland during 'The Troubles' where he saw combat against the Provisional IRA (PIRA) in an urban reconnaissance unit trained by and seconded to the Special Air Service (SAS).

After his term of enlistment ended, Walker returned to Canada and worked as a private investigator and eventually began travelling to S.E. Asia on assignments. In the late 1980s, he famously located a missing refugee girl from Cambodia whom he re-united with her refugee family in Canada. While in Canada, Walker worked with the Canadian Security Intelligence Service to identify Khmer Rouge genocide perpetrators who had infiltrated into Canada among Cambodian refugees in the 1980s.

In the late 1980s and early 1990s, Walker trained Karen National Liberation Army insurgents on the Thailand-Myanmar border, where he met his wife in a remote northern Thai village. He brought her to Canada and after five years they divorced amicably.

During the 1990s–2000s, Walker worked as a freelance photo-journalist, screenwriter and film production fixer on films like The Beach and with ABC News' Diane Sawyer on her coverage of the tsunami in 2004. He worked with Canadian filmmakers Peter Lynch and Peter Vronsky in Toronto and Cambodia. In 1998, Walker published a book of love letters he co-edited from Bangkok bar girls to their foreign boyfriends, Hello My Big, Big Honey!.

In the early 1990s, Walker was co-producing an independent feature film he had written, The Man from Year Zero with actor Haing S. Ngor from the movie The Killing Fields. Walker's screenplay described how Cambodian refugees in Canada encounter a former Khmer Rouge executioner hiding among them and was going to feature Ngor in the role of the fugitive perpetrator. But after Ngor was murdered by Cambodian gang members in Los Angeles in 1996, the project collapsed.

In 2009, Walker earned an M.A. at York University in Toronto in the field of Augmented Reality before returning to Cambodia. As part of his M.A. thesis, Walker made a short film The Augmented Cambodian.

Walker continued to explore themes in Cambodia's history and in 2012 he returned to Cambodia to begin researching a documentary The Poorest Man, the story of an "Oskar Schindler"-like former Khmer Rouge village chief who risked his life to save victims in his village from the Pol Pot regime's genocidal killings. As many of the Khmer Rouge perpetrators had returned to Cambodia in the 1990s, and re-entered government service, police, military and business, and were now claiming that they "had no choice" in perpetrating their crimes under Pol Pot, Walker's proposed film about the one Khmer Rouge functionary who demonstrated they did have a choice and survived Pol Pot just the same, was met with hostility from some sectors in Cambodia.

== Disappearance and death ==
On February 14, 2014, Walker disappeared after he left his guest house in Cambodia. Hotel staff stated room service cleaning staff went to Walker's room around 2 pm and he said he would leave the room so the room could be cleaned. He left with a bottle of water in hand and never returned.

Canada has had no embassy in Cambodia and limited its involvement, while Cambodian authorities were hindered by a lack of resources and forensic science capacity. Walker had no immediate family to advocate for him, while several private investigations, initiated by friends in different circles, began to duel with each other in bitter rivalry.

On May 1, Walker's body was found by children at Cambodia's Angkor Temple Complex, near the "Gates of Death" at Angkor Thom, approximately 13 kilometers from where he disappeared. Two autopsy reports (one commissioned by Walker's family) could not determine a cause of death, but indicated that Walker died many weeks before his body was discovered, probably on the day of his disappearance. Walker's body was recovered by his ex-wife's family, cremated and his ashes enshrined in the northern Thai village where he had met his wife, as per his wishes.

His disappearance and death remain unsolved.

== See also ==
- List of solved missing person cases (post-2000)
- List of unsolved deaths
