= Serial killer =

Individual who commits a series of similar murders

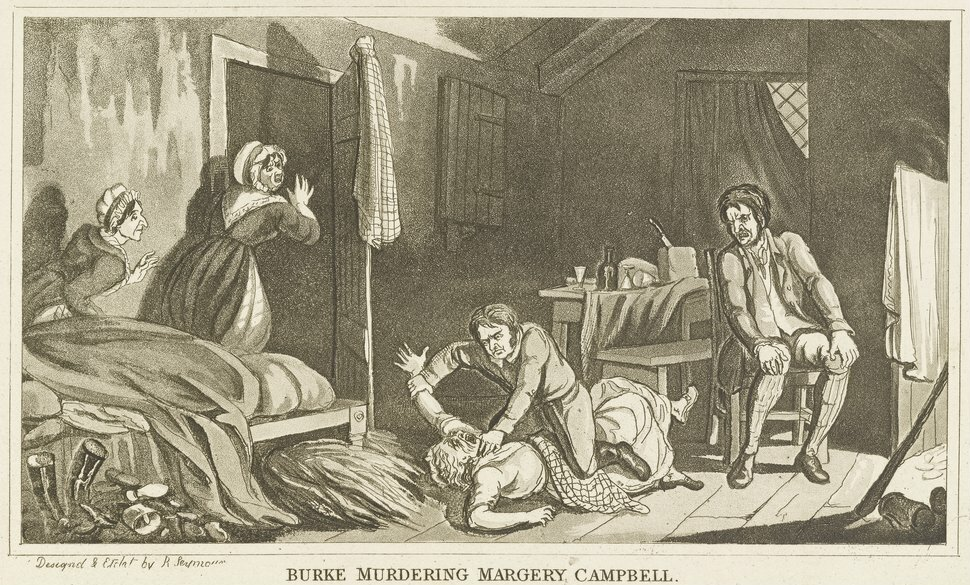
1829 illustration of Irish serial killer William Burke murdering Margaret Docherty

A serial killer (also called a serial murderer) is an individual who murders three or more people, with the killings taking place over a period of more than one month in three or more separate events, and the killings having a perverse psychological motive. The Federal Bureau of Investigation (FBI) states that the motives of serial killers can include psychotic delusions, thrill-seeking, and attention seeking. The victims tend to have things in common, such as demographic profile, appearance, gender, or race. The primary motivations for serial killing involve some form of psychological gratification, usually though not always sexual. Some serial killers lack motive altogether for their murders.

== Etymology and definition ==
The English term and concept of serial killer are commonly attributed to former Federal Bureau of Investigation special agent Robert Ressler, who used the term in the 1970s. (Note: Various sources place the year of Ressler's usage of the word in 1974) He stated that the term came to him from his childhood memories of watching "serial adventures" on Saturdays, which kept him wanting to watch more. Ressler viewed that serial killers are "obsessed with fantasy", and have "nonfulfilled experiences" that drive them to commit the next killing. Author Ann Rule claimed in her 2004 book, Kiss Me, Kill Me, that the English-language credit for coining the term goes to Los Angeles Police Department detective Pierce Brooks, who created the Violent Criminal Apprehension Program (ViCAP) system in 1985.

The German term and concept were coined by criminologist Ernst Gennat, who described Peter Kürten as a Serienmörder ('serial-murderer') in his article "Die Düsseldorfer Sexualverbrechen" (1930). In his book, Serial Killers: The Method and Madness of Monsters (2004), criminal justice historian Peter Vronsky notes that while Ressler might have coined the English term "serial homicide" within the law in 1974, the terms serial murder and serial murderer appear in John Brophy's book, The Meaning of Murder (1966). Brophy used the term "serial murder" as an alternative to the term "mass murder", which he rejected as not useful to describe long term killings. He concluded his book by stating:

Classifications of murder, though useful, are never so absolute and clear cut as they appear . . . Perhaps the only quality which all serial murderers have in common is the sustained purpose to murder. It is this which reveals them indisputably as abnormal and marks them off from murderers who may plead in mitigation that they killed on impulse, under provocation, or because circumstance brought them to a certain place at a certain time.

Multiple sources state that the term serial killing first entered into broader American popular usage when published in The New York Times in early 1981, to describe Atlanta serial killer Wayne Williams. Subsequently, throughout the 1980s, the term was used again in the pages of The New York Times on 233 occasions. By the end of the 1990s, the use of the term had increased to 2,514 instances in the paper.

When defining serial killers, researchers generally use "three or more murders" as the baseline, considering it sufficient to provide a pattern without being overly restrictive. Independent of the number of murders, they need to have been committed at different times, and are usually committed in different places. The lack of a significant break between the murders ("cooling-off period") marks the difference between a spree killer and a serial killer. The category has, however, been found to be of no real value to law enforcement, because of definitional problems relating to the concept of a "cooling-off period". Cases of extended bouts of sequential killings over periods of weeks or months with no apparent "cooling-off period" or "return to normality" have caused some experts to suggest a hybrid category of "spree-serial killer".

A core aspect of serial murder as opposed to other acts of murder is the motivation behind the killing, which is described as either being irrational or nonrational, and aims to satisfy a psychological urge or desire. An estimate claimed that the leading motive for about 50 percent of serial killers was sexual reasons, with thrill seeking and a mere desire for killing being adjacent motives as well. According to the FBI's NCAVC report on serial killers, around 81.5% of murders were determined to be sexually motivated.

There is a debate on the precise definition of serial murder. Ferguson et al. (2003) viewed that no definition of serial killing will encapsulate offenders without error, and that more broad definitions will run the risk of "lacking the ability to discriminate between serial murderers and other offenders".

In Controversial Issues in Criminology, Fuller and Hickey write that "[t]he element of time involved between murderous acts is primary in the differentiation of serial, mass, and spree murderer," later elaborating that spree killers "engage in the killing acts for days or weeks" and the "methods of murder and types of victims vary". Andrew Cunanan is given as an example of spree killing, while Charles Whitman is mentioned in connection with mass murder, and Jeffrey Dahmer with serial killing.

In 2005, the FBI hosted a multi-disciplinary symposium in San Antonio, Texas, which brought together 135 experts on serial murder from a variety of fields and specialties with the goal of identifying commonalities across multiple-murder incidents. The group settled on a definition of serial murder, which FBI investigators widely accept as their standard: "The unlawful killing of two or more victims by the same offender(s) in separate events". Serial homicide researcher Enzo Yaksic found that the FBI was justified in lowering the victim threshold from three to two victims given that serial murderers from these groups share similar pathologies.

== History ==
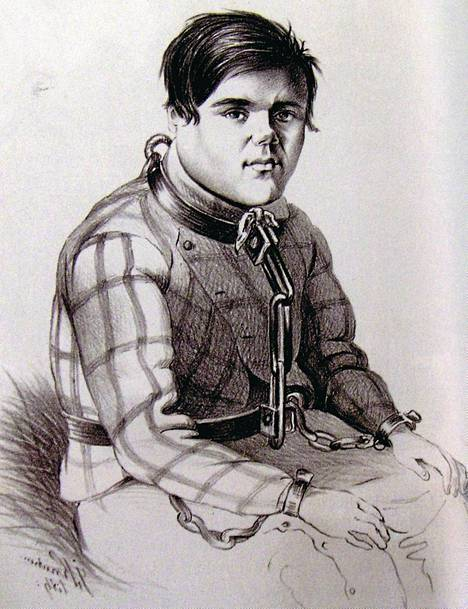
Juhani Aataminpoika, a Finnish serial killer also known as "Kerpeikkari" ("The Executioner"), was one of the most active serial killers of the 19th century, killing as many as 12 people in 1849 within five weeks before being caught.

=== Early accounts ===
Historical criminologists suggest that there have been serial killers throughout history. Some sources suggest that legends such as werewolves and vampires were inspired by medieval serial killers. Steven Egger states that, historically, what was known as serial murder was described as "lust murder".

=== Early modern period to 20th century ===
The majority of documented serial killers were active in the United States. In one study of serial homicide in South Africa, many patterns were similar to established patterns in the U.S., with some exceptions: no offenders were female, offenders were lower educated than in the U.S., and both victims and offenders were predominantly black.

In the 15th century, one of the wealthiest men in Europe and a former companion-in-arms of Joan of Arc, Gilles de Rais, was alleged to have sexually assaulted and killed peasant children, mainly boys, whom he had abducted from the surrounding villages and had taken to his castle. It is estimated that his victims numbered between 140 and 800. Sociologist and criminologist Aurélien Dyjak cautioned against applying the modern category of the "serial killer" to historical perpetrators of multiple murders such as de Rais. In his view, such an approach risks obscuring the specific contexts, motivations, and trajectories that shaped these crimes while creating the illusion of a historically continuous phenomenon. He states: "by designating Gilles de Rais as a serial killer, we are likely rewriting his history and reinforcing the notion that his crimes were a timeless manifestation of a universal human behavior".

The Hungarian aristocrat Elizabeth Báthory, born into one of the wealthiest families in Transylvania, allegedly tortured and killed as many as 650 girls and young women before her arrest in 1610.

Between 1564 and 1589, German farmer Peter Stumpp killed 14 children, including his own son. He also murdered two pregnant women and had an incestuous relationship with his daughter. Stumpp claimed to have been granted the ability to turn into a werewolf by the Devil. As punishment for his crimes, Stumpp was put on a torture wheel and executed. His head was later severed and put on a pole next to the figure of a wolf to scare other people away from claiming themselves werewolves, too.

In his 1886 book, Psychopathia Sexualis, psychiatrist Richard von Krafft-Ebing noted a case of a serial murderer in the 1870s, a Frenchman named Eusebius Pieydagnelle who had a sexual obsession with blood and confessed to murdering six people.

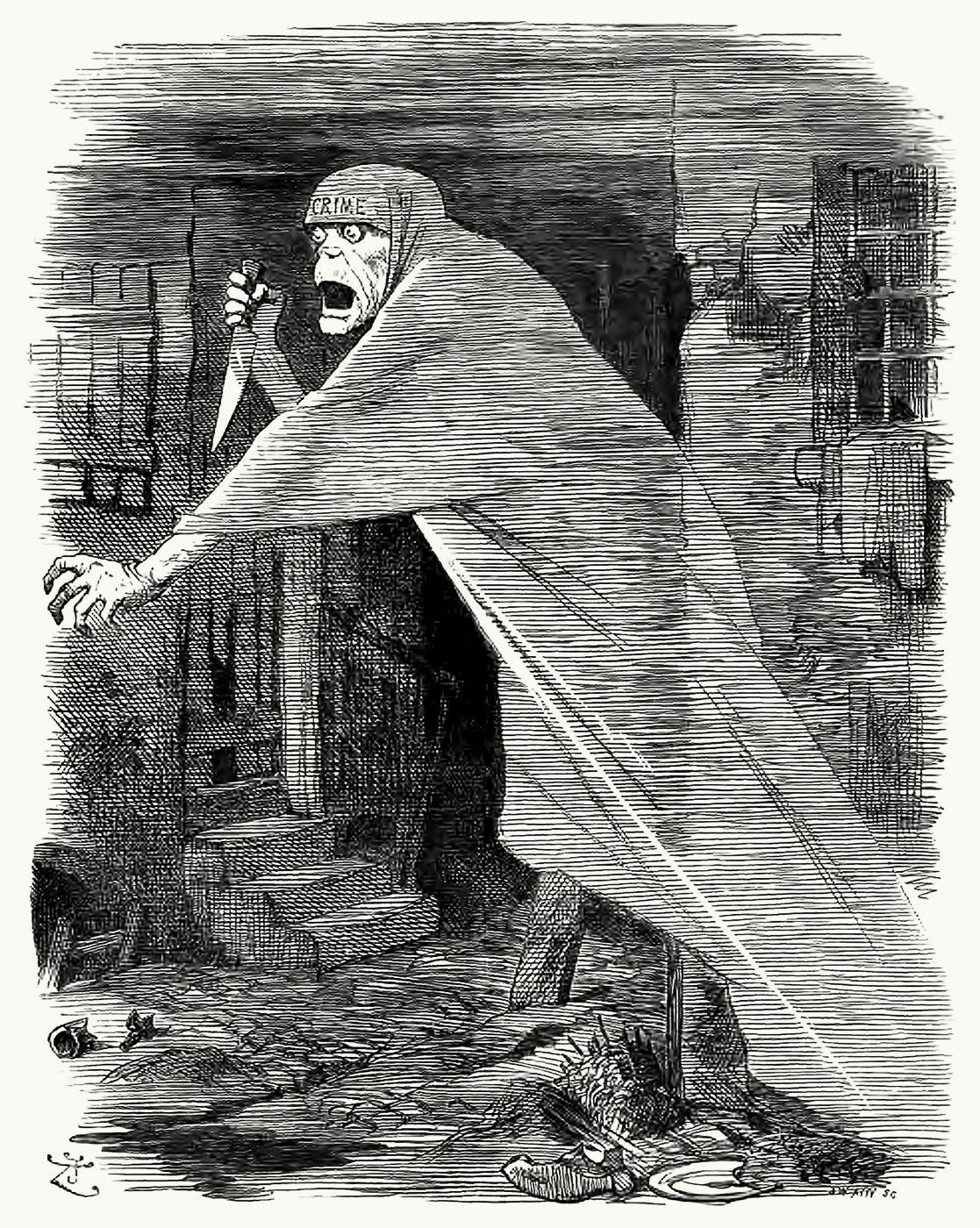
The 'Nemesis of Neglect': Jack the Ripper depicted as a phantom stalking Whitechapel, and as an embodiment of social neglect, in a Punch cartoon of 1888

The unidentified killer Jack the Ripper, who has been called the first modern serial killer, killed at least five women, and possibly more, in London in 1888. He was the subject of a massive manhunt and investigation by the Metropolitan Police, during which many modern criminal investigation techniques were pioneered. A large team of policemen conducted house-to-house inquiries, forensic material was collected and suspects were identified and traced. Police surgeon Thomas Bond assembled one of the earliest character profiles of the offender.

The Ripper murders also marked an important watershed in the treatment of crime by journalists. While not the first serial killer in history, Jack the Ripper's case was the first to create a worldwide media frenzy. The dramatic murders of financially destitute women in the midst of the wealth of London focused the media's attention on the plight of the urban poor and gained coverage worldwide. Jack the Ripper has also been called the most infamous serial killer of all time, and his legend has spawned hundreds of theories on his real identity and many works of fiction.

H. H. Holmes was labeled by Harold Schechter in his 1998 book Depraved as serial killer in the United States, with Holmes being responsible for the death of at least nine victims in the early 1890s. The case was one of the first involving a serial murderer that gained widespread notoriety and publicity through sensationalized accounts in William Randolph Hearst's newspapers. In his book about Holmes, author Adam Selzer disputed the label of "serial killer".

At the same time of the Holmes case, in France, Joseph Vacher became known as "The French Ripper" after killing and mutilating 11 women and children. He was executed in 1898 after confessing to his crimes.

Another notable non-American serial killer is Pedro Lopez, a murderer from South America, who killed a minimum of 110 young girls between 1969 and 1980. However, he claims that the number is over 300. He was released from a mental facility in 1998 and his whereabouts are still unknown. He is commonly nicknamed the "Monster of the Andes". An additional non-American serial killer is Luis Garavito from Colombia. Garavito would kill and torture boys using various disguises. He murdered around 140 boys ranging in ages from 8 to 16. He would dump his victims' bodies in mass graves.

=== Late 20th century ===
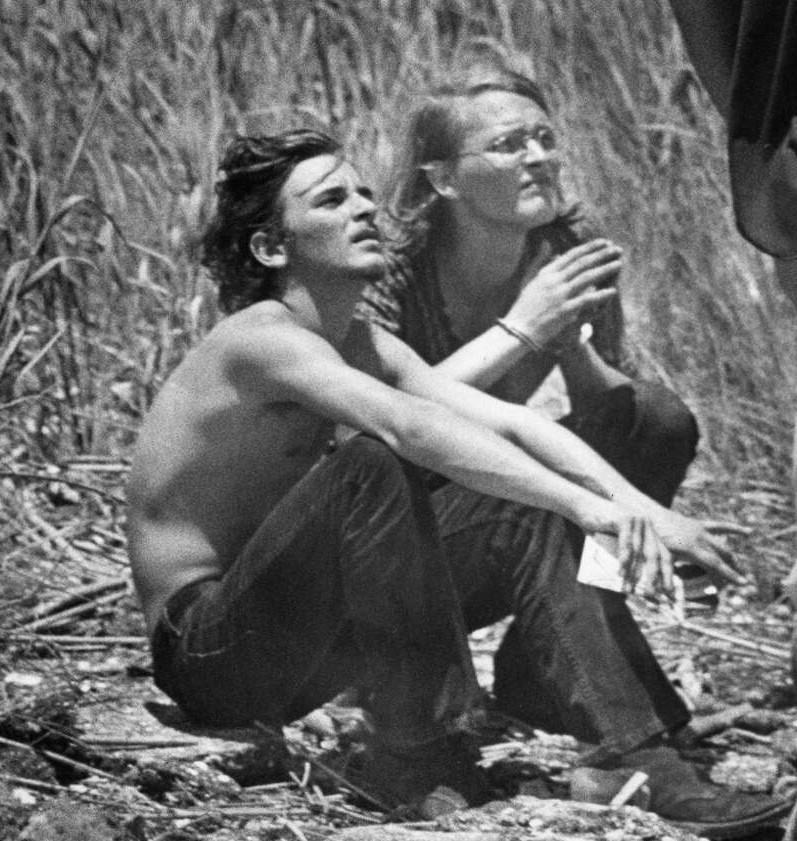
Elmer Wayne Henley (left) and David Owen Brooks (right), accomplices to serial killer Dean Corll, who murdered at least 29 teenage boys and young men between 1970 and 1973

The serial killing phenomenon in the United States was especially prominent from 1970 to 2000, which has been described as the "golden age of serial murder". The cause of the spike in serial killings has been attributed to urbanization, which put people in close proximity and offered anonymity. The number of active serial killers in the United States peaked in 1989 and has been steadily trending downward since, coinciding with an overall decrease in crime in the United States since that time. The decline in serial killers has no known single cause but is attributed to a number of factors. Mike Aamodt, emeritus professor at Radford University in Virginia, attributes the decline in number of serial killings to less frequent use of parole, improved forensic technology, and people behaving more cautiously. Claimed causes for the general reduction in violent crime following the 1990s include increased incarceration in the United States, the end of the crack epidemic in the United States, decreased lead exposure in early childhood and the legalization of abortion with the Roe v. Wade decision. Serial murder in the United States is rare, with 1 percent of murders being attributable to serial killers.

== Characteristics ==
Some commonly found characteristics of serial killers include the following:

- They may exhibit varying degrees of mental illness or psychopathy, which may contribute to their homicidal behavior.
  - For example, someone who is mentally ill may have psychotic breaks that cause them to believe they are another person or are compelled to murder by other entities.
  - Psychopathic behavior that is consistent with traits common to some serial killers include sensation seeking, a lack of remorse or guilt, impulsivity, the need for control, and predatory behavior. Psychopaths can seem 'normal' and often quite charming, a state of adaptation that psychiatrist Hervey Cleckley called the "mask of sanity".
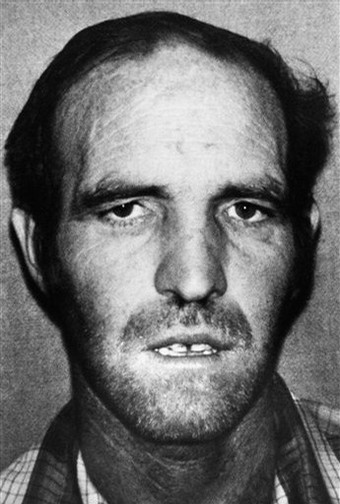
    Mug shot of alleged serial killer, cannibal and necrophile Ottis Toole
- Serial killers may be more likely to engage in fetishism, partialism or necrophilia, which are paraphilias that involve a strong tendency to experience the object of erotic interest almost as if it were a physical representation of the symbolized body. Individuals engage in paraphilias which are organized along a continuum; participating in varying levels of fantasy perhaps by focusing on body parts (partialism), symbolic objects which serve as physical extensions of the body (fetishism), or the anatomical physicality of the human body; specifically regarding its inner parts and sexual organs (one example being necrophilia).
- A disproportionate number exhibit Macdonald triad predictors of future violent behavior:
  - Many are fascinated with fire setting.
  - They are involved in sadistic activity; especially in children who have not reached sexual maturity, this activity may take the form of torturing animals.
  - More than 60 percent, or simply a large proportion, wet their beds beyond the age of 12.
- Some were involved in petty crimes, such as fraud, theft, vandalism, or similar offenses.
- Often, they have trouble staying employed and tend to work in menial jobs. The FBI, however, states, "Serial murderers often seem normal; have families and/or a steady job."
- Studies have suggested that serial killers generally have an average or low-average IQ, although they are often described, and perceived, as possessing IQs in the above-average range. A sample of 202 IQs of serial killers had a median IQ of 89. Some organized serial killers have a slightly higher IQ score averaging a little bit over 99, where disorganized killers average just under 93 in theirs. The average IQ of serial killers is 94.7.
- As a group, serial killers may have a variety of personality disorders. They are often not adjudicated as insane under the law.

There are exceptions to these criteria, however. For example, Harold Shipman was a successful professional (a General Practitioner working for the NHS). He was considered a pillar of the local community; he even won a professional award for a children's asthma clinic and was interviewed by Granada Television's World in Action on ITV. Dennis Nilsen was an ex-soldier turned civil servant and trade unionist who had no previous criminal record when arrested. Neither was known to have exhibited many of the tell-tale signs. Vlado Taneski, a crime reporter, was a career journalist who was caught after a series of articles he wrote gave clues that he had murdered people. Russell Williams was a successful and respected career Royal Canadian Air Force Colonel who was convicted of murdering two women, along with fetish burglaries and rapes.

=== Development ===
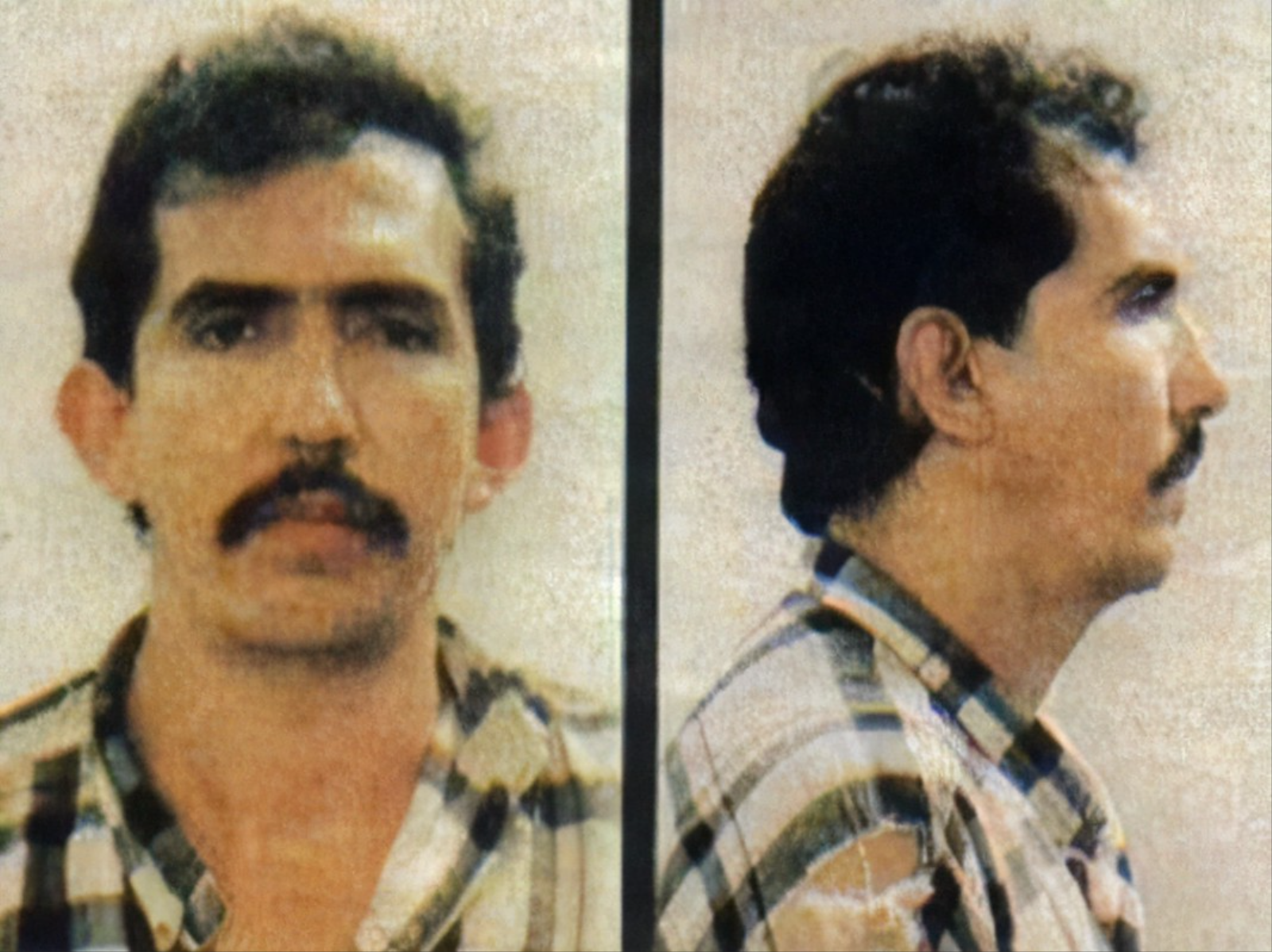
Colombian serial killer Luis Garavito, also known as La Bestia ("The Beast"). His father subjected him to severe physical and emotional abuse.

Many serial killers have faced similar problems in their childhood development. Hickey's Trauma Control Model explains how early childhood trauma can set the child up for deviant behavior in adulthood; the child's environment (either their parents or society) is the dominant factor determining whether or not the child's behavior escalates into homicidal activity.

Family, or lack thereof, is the most prominent part of a child's development because it is what the child can identify with on a regular basis. "The serial killer is no different from any other individual who is instigated to seek approval from parents, sexual partners, or others." This need for approval is what influences children to attempt to develop social relationships with their family and peers. "The quality of their attachments to parents and other members of the family is critical to how these children relate to and value other members of society."

Wilson and Seaman (1990) conducted a study on incarcerated serial killers, and what they concluded was the most influential factor that contributed to their homicidal activity. Almost all of the serial killers in the study had experienced some sort of environmental problems during their childhood, such as a broken home caused by divorce, or a lack of a parental figure to discipline the child. Nearly half of the serial killers had experienced some type of physical or sexual abuse, and more of them had experienced emotional neglect.

When a parent has a drug or alcohol problem, the attention in the household is on the parents rather than the child. This neglect of the child leads to the lowering of their self-esteem and helps develop a fantasy world in which they are in control. Hickey's Trauma Control Model supports how parental neglect can facilitate deviant behavior, especially if the child sees substance abuse in action. This then leads to disposition (the inability to attach), which can further lead to homicidal behavior, unless the child finds a way to develop substantial relationships and fight the label they receive. If a child receives no support from anyone, then they are unlikely to recover from the traumatic event in a positive way. As stated by E. E. Maccoby, "the family has continued to be seen as a major—perhaps the major—arena for socialization".

==== Chromosomal makeup ====
There have been studies looking into the possibility that an abnormality with one's chromosomes could be the trigger for serial killers. Serial killer Bobby Joe Long and mass murderer Richard Speck came to attention for reported chromosomal abnormalities. Long had an extra X chromosome. Speck was erroneously reported to have an extra Y chromosome; in fact, his karyotype was performed twice and was normal each time. While attempts have been made to link the XYY karyotype to violence, including serial murder, research has consistently found little or no association between violent criminal behaviour and an extra Y chromosome.

==== Fantasy ====
Abused children, who do not have the power to control the mistreatment they suffer, sometimes create a new reality to which they can escape. This new reality becomes their fantasy that they have total control of and becomes part of their daily existence. In this fantasy world, their emotional development is guided and maintained. According to Garrison (1996), "the child becomes sociopathic because the normal development of the concepts of right and wrong and empathy towards others is retarded because the child's emotional and social development occurs within his self-centered fantasies. A person can do no wrong in his own world and the pain of others is of no consequence when the purpose of the fantasy world is to satisfy the needs of one person" (Garrison, 1996). Boundaries between fantasy and reality are lost and fantasies turn to dominance, control, sexual conquest, and violence, eventually leading to murder. Fantasy can lead to the first step in the process of a dissociative state, which, in the words of Stephen Giannangelo, "allows the serial killer to leave the stream of consciousness for what is, to him, a better place".

Criminologist Jose Sanchez reports, "The young criminal you see today is more detached from his victim, more ready to hurt or kill. The lack of empathy for their victims among young criminals is just one symptom of a problem that afflicts the whole society." Lorenzo Carcaterra, author of Gangster (2001), explains how potential criminals are labeled by society, which can then lead to their offspring also developing in the same way through the cycle of violence. The ability for serial killers to appreciate the emotional lives of others is severely compromised, presumably leading to their dehumanization of others. This process may be considered an expression of the intersubjectivity associated with a cognitive deficit regarding the capability to make sharp distinctions between other people and inanimate objects. For these individuals, objects can appear to possess animistic or humanistic power while people are perceived as objects. This is not to be confused nor conflated with the development of facial processing in individuals on the autism spectrum.

Before he was executed, serial killer Ted Bundy stated media violence and pornography had stimulated and increased his need to commit homicide, although this statement was made during last-ditch efforts to appeal his death sentence.

=== Organized, disorganized, and mixed ===
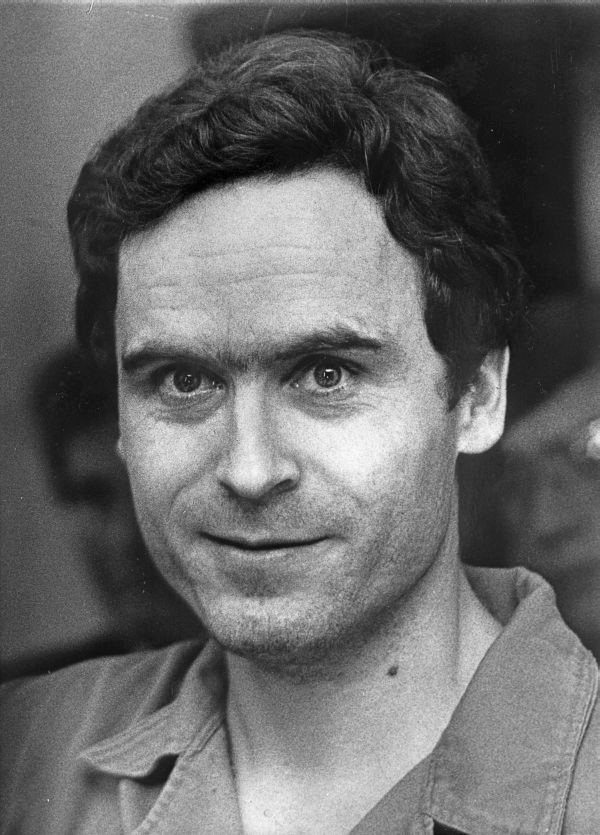
Ted Bundy in custody, Florida, United States, July 1978 (State Archives of Florida)

In the 1970s and 1980s, FBI profilers instigated a simple division of serial killers into "organized" and "disorganized"; that is, those who plan their crimes, and those who act on impulse. The FBI's Crime Classification Manual now places serial killers into three categories: organized, disorganized, and mixed (i.e., offenders who exhibit organized and disorganized characteristics). Some killers descend from organized to disorganized as their killings continue, as in the case of psychological decompensation or overconfidence due to having evaded capture.

Organized serial killers often plan their crimes methodically, usually abducting victims, killing them in one place and disposing of them in another. They often lure the victims with ploys appealing to their sense of sympathy. Others specifically target prostitutes, who are likely to go voluntarily with a stranger. These killers maintain a high degree of control over the crime scene and usually have a solid knowledge of forensic science that enables them to cover their tracks, such as burying the body or weighing it down and sinking it in a river. They follow their crimes in the news media carefully and often take pride in their actions as if it were all a grand project.

Often, organized killers have social and other interpersonal skills sufficient to enable them to develop both personal and romantic relationships, friends and lovers and sometimes even attract and maintain a spouse and sustain a family including children. Among serial killers, those of this type are in the event of their capture most likely to be described by acquaintances as kind and unlikely to hurt anyone. Ted Bundy and John Wayne Gacy are examples of organized serial killers. In general, the IQs of organized serial killers tend to be normal range, with a mean of 98.7.

Disorganized serial killers are usually far more impulsive, often committing their murders with a random weapon available at the time, and usually do not attempt to hide the body. They are likely to be unemployed, a loner, or both, with very few friends. They often turn out to have a history of mental illness, and their modus operandi (M.O.) or lack thereof is often marked by excessive violence and sometimes necrophilia or sexual violence. Disorganized serial killers have been found to have a lower mean IQ than organized serial killers, at 89.4. Mixed serial killers, with both organized and disorganized traits, have an average IQ of 100.9, but a low sample size.

=== Medical professionals ===
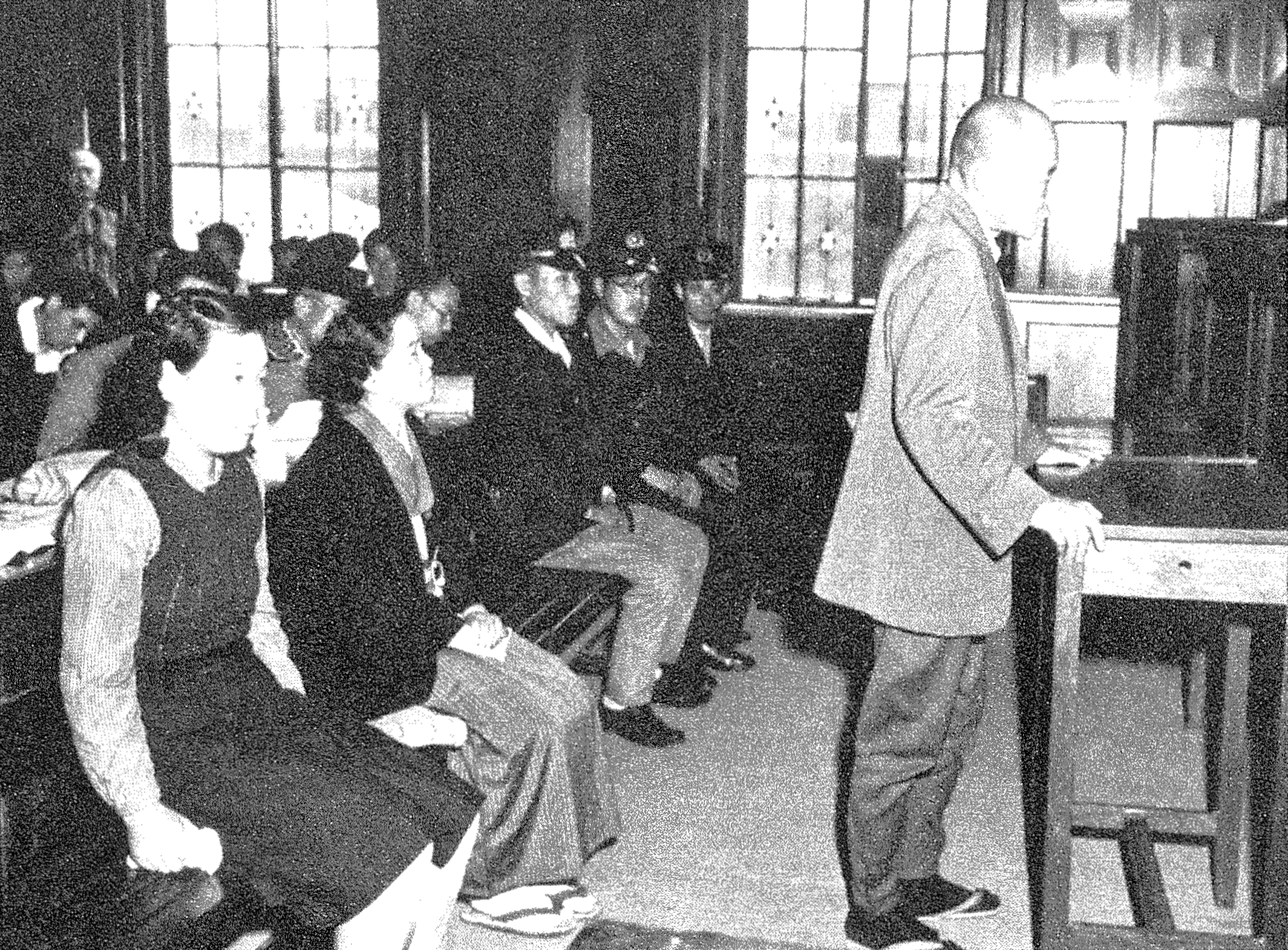
Trial of Miyuki Ishikawa and her accomplices who killed infants born out of wedlock, 1948

Some people with a pathological interest in the power of life and death tend to be attracted to medical professions or acquiring such a job. These kinds of killers are sometimes referred to as "angels of death" or angels of mercy. Medical professionals will kill their patients for money, for a sense of sadistic pleasure, for a belief that they are "easing" the patient's pain, or simply "because they can". Perhaps the most prolific of these was the British doctor Harold Shipman. Another such killer was nurse Jane Toppan, who admitted during her murder trial that she was sexually aroused by death. She would administer a drug mixture to patients she chose as her victims, lie in bed with them and hold them close to her body as they died.

Another medical professional serial killer is Genene Jones. It is believed she killed 11 to 46 infants and children while working at Bexar County Medical Center Hospital in San Antonio, Texas, United States. A similar case occurred in Britain in 1991, where nurse Beverley Allitt killed four children at the hospital where she worked, attempted to kill three more, and injured a further six over the course of two months. A 21st-century example is Canadian nurse Elizabeth Wettlaufer, who murdered elderly patients in the nursing homes where she worked. William George Davis is another hospital nurse who was sentenced to death in Texas for the murder of four patients.

=== Female ===
Female serial killers are rare compared to their male counterparts. Sources suggest that female serial killers represented less than one in every six known serial murderers in the United States between 1800 and 2004 (64 females from a total of 416 known offenders), or that around 15% of U.S. serial killers have been women, with a collective number of victims between 427 and 612. The authors of Lethal Ladies, Amanda L. Farrell, Robert D. Keppel, and Victoria B. Titterington, state that "the Justice Department indicated 36 female serial killers have been active over the course of the last century." According to The Journal of Forensic Psychiatry & Psychology, there is evidence that 16% of all serial killers are women.

Michael D. Kelleher and C. L. Kelleher created several categories to describe female serial killers. They used the classifications of black widow, angel of death, sexual predator, revenge, profit or crime, team killer, question of sanity, unexplained, and unsolved. In using these categories, they observed that most women fell into the categories of the black widow or team killer. Although motivations for female serial killers can include attention seeking, addiction, or the result of psychopathological behavioral factors, female serial killers are commonly categorized as murdering men for material gain, usually being emotionally close to their victims, and generally needing to have a relationship with the victim, hence the traditional cultural image of the "black widow".

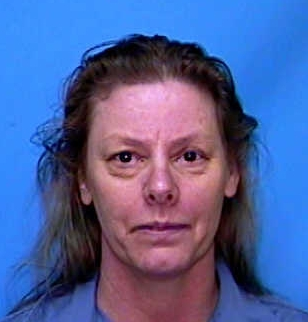
Highway sex worker Aileen Wuornos killed seven men in Florida between 1989 and 1990.

The methods that female serial killers use for murder are frequently covert or low-profile, such as murder by poison (the preferred choice for killing). Other methods used by female serial killers include shootings (used by 20%), suffocation (16%), stabbing (11%), and drowning (5%). They commit killings in specific places, such as their home or a health-care facility, or at different locations within the same city or state. The means, location, and demographic of Aileen Wuornos's crimes (gun; outdoors; men soliciting prostitution) is purely circumstantial in terms of suffering from the pattern of other female serial killers. Her victims were johns picking up highway prostitutes; there is no time for poisoning; she was homeless. One analysis of "86 female serial killers from the United States found that the victims tended to be spouses, children or the elderly". Other studies indicate that since 1975, increasingly strangers are marginally the most common victim of female serial killers, and that only 26% of female serial killers kill for material gain only. Sources state that each killer will have her own proclivities, needs, and triggers. A review of the published literature on female serial murder stated that "sexual or sadistic motives are believed to be extremely rare in female serial murderers, and psychopathic traits and histories of childhood abuse have been consistently reported in these women."

A study by Eric W. Hickey (2010) of 64 female serial killers in the United States indicated that sexual activity was one of several motives in 10% of the cases, enjoyment in 11%, and control in 14%, and that 51% of all U.S. female serial killers murdered at least one woman and 31% murdered at least one child. In other cases, women have been involved as an accomplice with a male serial killer as a part of a serial killing team. A 2015 study published in The Journal of Forensic Psychiatry & Psychology found that the most common motive for female serial killers was for financial gain and almost 40% of them had experienced some sort of mental illness.

Peter Vronsky in Female Serial Killers (2007) maintains that female serial killers today often kill for the same reason males do: as a means of expressing rage and control. He suggests that sometimes the theft of the victims' property by the female "black widow" type serial killer appears to be for material gain, but really is akin to a male serial killer's collecting of totems (souvenirs) from the victim as a way of exerting continued control over the victim and reliving it. By contrast, Hickey states that although popular perception sees "black widow" female serial killers as something of the Victorian past, in his statistical study of female serial killer cases reported in the United States since 1826, approximately 75% occurred since 1950.

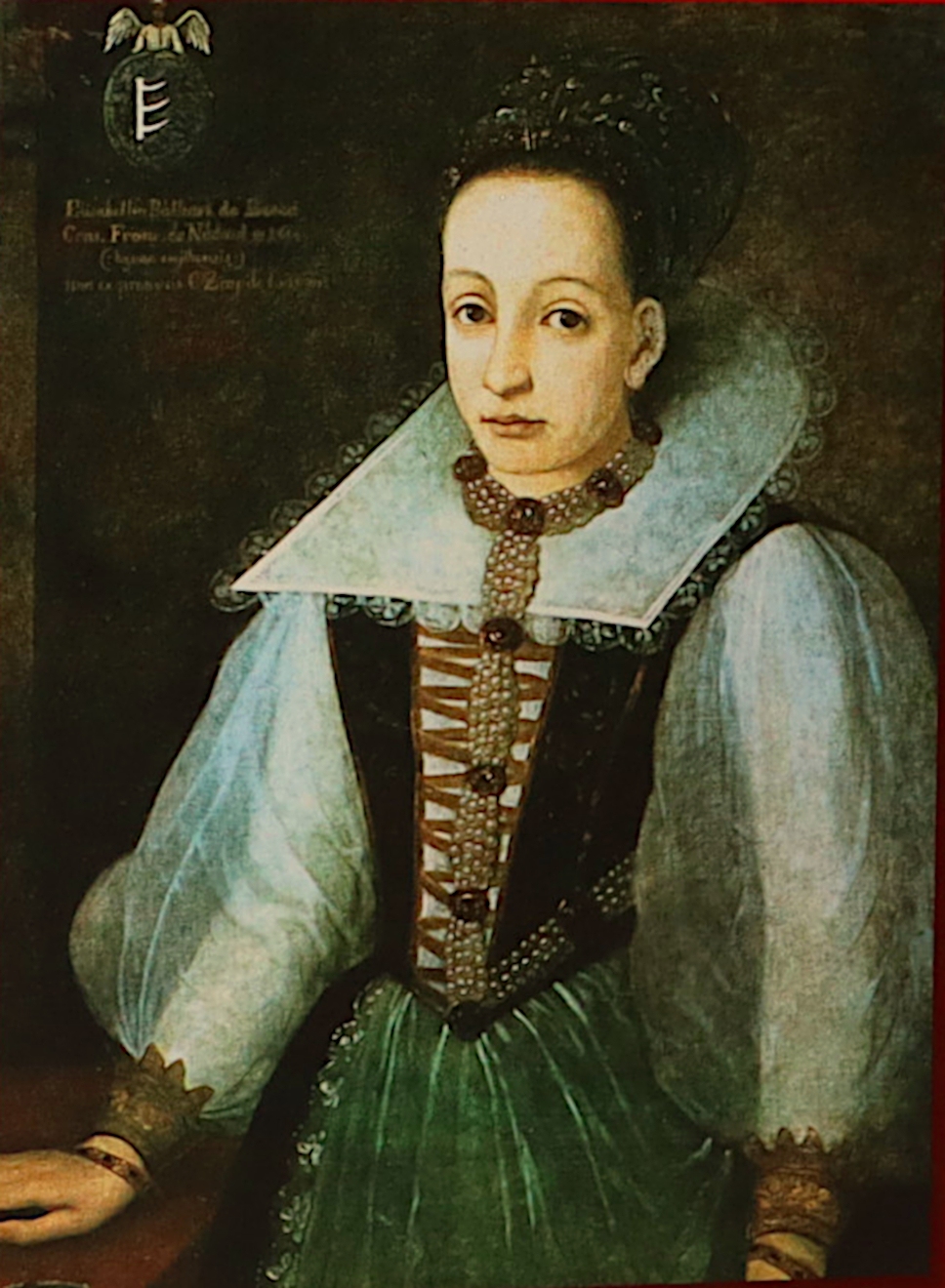
Hungarian countess Elizabeth Báthory is thought to have murdered hundreds of young women.

Elizabeth Báthory is sometimes cited as the most prolific female serial killer in all of history. Formally countess Elizabeth Báthory de Ecsed (Báthory Erzsébet in Hungarian, August 7, 1560 – August 21, 1614), she was a countess from the Báthory family. Before her husband's death, Elizabeth took great pleasure in torturing the staff, by jamming pins under the servant's fingernails or stripping servants and throwing them into the snow. After her husband's death, she and four collaborators were accused of torturing and killing hundreds of girls and young women, with one witness attributing to them over 600 victims, though the number for which they were convicted was 80. Elizabeth herself was neither tried nor convicted. In 1610, however, she was imprisoned in the Csejte Castle, where she remained bricked in a set of rooms until her death four years later.

A 2010 article by Perri and Lichtenwald addressed some of the misconceptions concerning female criminality. In the article, Perri and Lichtenwald analyze the current research regarding female psychopathy, including case studies of female psychopathic killers featuring Munchausen syndrome by proxy, cesarean section homicide, fraud detection homicide, female kill teams, and a female serial killer.

=== Juvenile ===
Juvenile serial killers are rare. There are three main categories that juvenile serial killers can fit into: primary, maturing, and secondary killers. There have been studies done to compare and contrast these three groups and to discover similarities and differences between them. Although these types of serial killers are less common, oftentimes adult serial killers may make their debut at an early age and it can be an opportunity for researchers to study what factors brought about the behavior. While juvenile serial killers are rare, the youngest felon on death row is a juvenile serial killer named Harvey Miguel Robinson who was 17 at the time of his crimes and 18 at the time of his arrest.

=== Ethnicity and demographics in the United States ===
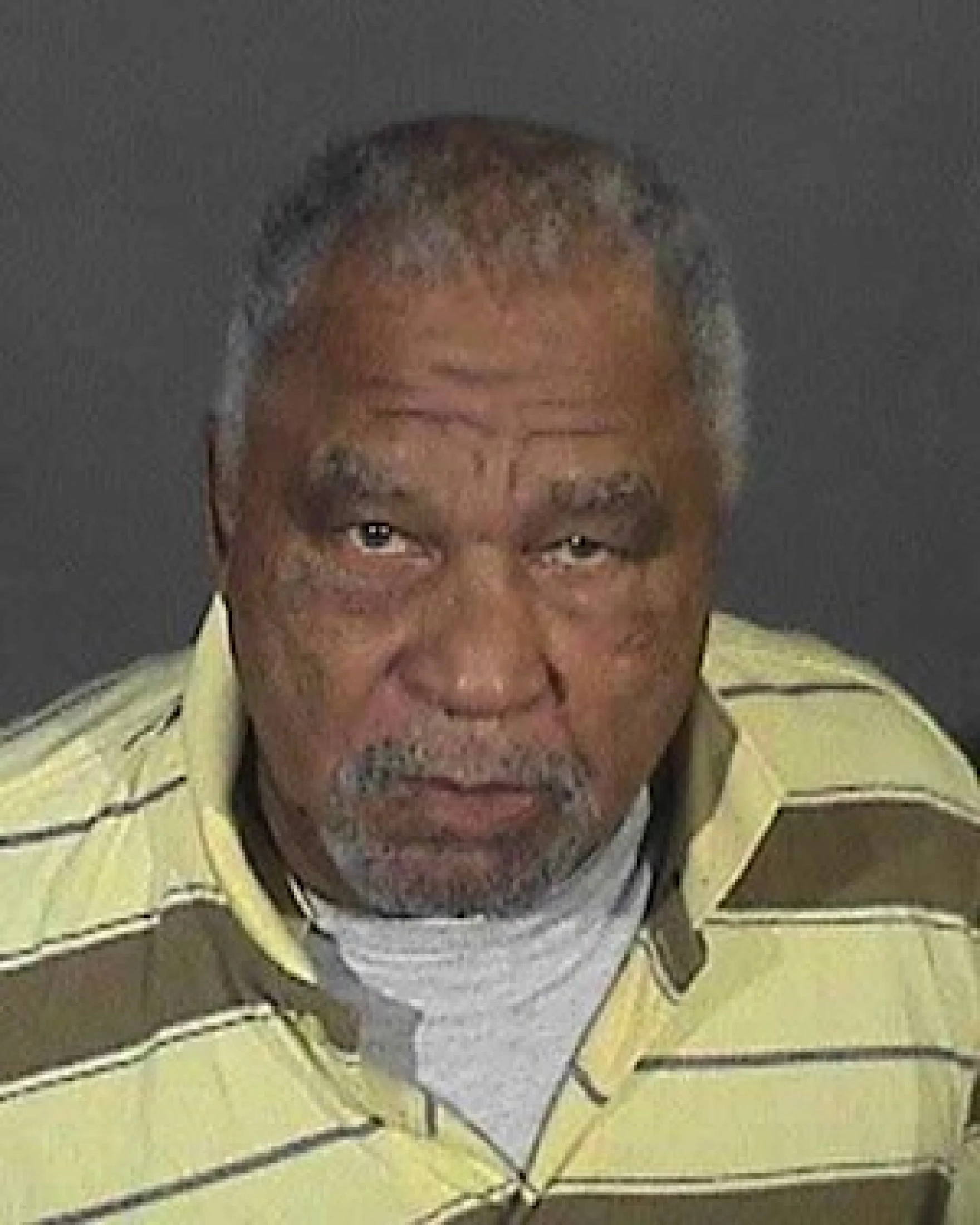
Samuel Little confirmed his involvement in at least 60 murders, the largest number of confirmed victims for any serial killer in American history.

The claim that all serial killers are white males has been rejected as a myth. However, according to the FBI, the racial composition of serial killers as a group reflects the racial composition of the overall U.S. population. According to a 2016 study, since the year 2000, African Americans accounted for roughly 60% of all serial killers in the United States, making white men underrepresented as serial killers in this period.

Anthony Walsh has stated non-white serial killers are often ignored by the mainstream media. According to his analysis, Black males were over-represented among serial killers by a factor of 2, yet media coverage at that time overwhelmingly focused on white male serial killers. Walsh argues that mainstream media ignores black serial killers because there is a fear of allegations of racism. Walsh goes on to state that this may enable Black serial killers to operate more effectively, as their crimes do not get the same media coverage as the crimes of non-Black serial killers.

== Motives ==
The motives of serial killers are generally placed into four categories: visionary, mission-oriented, hedonistic, and power or control; however, the motives of any given killer may display considerable overlap among these categories.

=== Visionary ===
Visionary serial killers have psychotic breaks with reality, sometimes believing they are another person or are compelled to murder by entities such as the Devil or God. The two most common subgroups are "demon mandated" and "God mandated".

Herbert Mullin believed the American casualties in the Vietnam War were preventing California from experiencing the Big One. As the war wound down, Mullin claimed his father instructed him via telepathy to raise the number of "human sacrifices to nature" to delay a catastrophic earthquake that would plunge California into the ocean. David Berkowitz ("Son of Sam") may also be an example of a visionary serial killer, having claimed a demon transmitted orders through his neighbor's dog and instructed him to commit murder. Berkowitz later described those claims as a hoax, as originally concluded by psychiatrist David Abrahamsen.

=== Mission-oriented ===
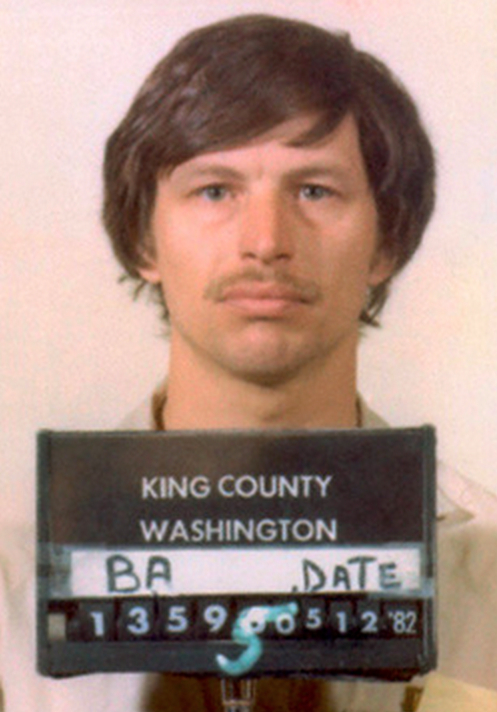
Gary Ridgway in 1982. Ridgway stated that he wanted to kill as many prostitutes as possible.

Mission-oriented killers typically justify their acts as "ridding the world" of certain types of people perceived as undesirable, such as the homeless, ex-cons, homosexuals, drug users, prostitutes, or people of different ethnicity or religion; however, they are generally not psychotic. Some see themselves as attempting to change society, often to cure a societal ill.

An example of a mission-oriented killer would be Joseph Paul Franklin, an American white supremacist who exclusively targeted Jewish, biracial, and African American individuals for the purpose of inciting a "race war". Saeed Hanaei was a serial killer convicted of murdering at least sixteen women in his native Iran, many of whom were sex workers. He reported his goal was to cleanse his city of "moral corruption" and that his mission was sanctioned by God.

=== Hedonistic ===
This type of serial killer seeks thrills and derives pleasure and satisfaction from killing, seeing people as expendable means to this goal. Forensic psychologists have identified three subtypes of the hedonistic killer: "lust", "thrill", and "comfort".

==== Lust ====
Sex is the primary motive of lust killers, whether or not the victims are dead, and fantasy plays a large role in their killings. Their sexual gratification depends on the amount of torture and mutilation they perform on their victims. The sexual serial murderer has a psychological need to have absolute control, dominance, and power over their victims, and the infliction of torture, pain, and ultimately death is used in an attempt to fulfill their need. They usually use weapons that require close contact with the victims, such as knives or hands. As lust killers continue with their murders, the time between killings decreases or the required level of stimulation increases, sometimes both.

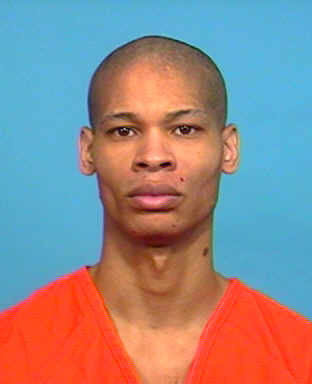
Paul Durousseau raped and murdered at least seven young women.

Kenneth Bianchi, one of the "Hillside Stranglers", murdered women and girls of different ages, races, and appearance because his sexual urges required different types of stimulation and increasing intensity. Jeffrey Dahmer searched for his perfect fantasy lover—beautiful, submissive and eternal. As his desire increased, he experimented with drugs, alcohol, and exotic sex. His increasing need for stimulation was demonstrated by the dismemberment of victims, whose heads and genitals he preserved, and by his attempts to create a "living zombie" under his control (by pouring acid into a hole drilled into the victim's skull).

Dahmer once said, "Lust played a big part of it. Control and lust. Once it happened the first time, it just seemed like it had control of my life from there on in. The killing was just a means to an end. That was the least satisfactory part. I didn't enjoy doing that. That's why I tried to create living zombies with acid and the drill." He further elaborated on this, also saying, "I wanted to see if it was possible to make—again, it sounds really gross—uh, zombies, people that would not have a will of their own, but would follow my instructions without resistance. So after that, I started using the drilling technique." He experimented with cannibalism to "ensure his victims would always be a part of him".

==== Thrill ====
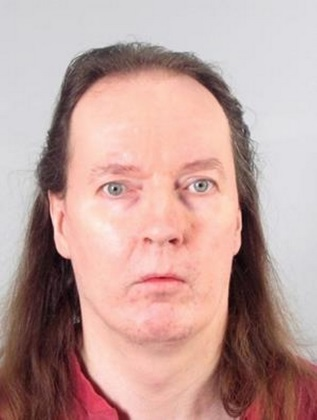
According to psychiatric reports, Michael Maria Penttilä, the so-called "serial strangler", admired the primordial, violent manhood of his teenage years.

The primary motive of a thrill killer is to induce pain or terror in their victims, which provides stimulation and excitement for the killer. They seek the adrenaline rush provided by hunting and killing victims. Thrill killers murder only for the kill; usually, the attack is not prolonged, and there is no sexual aspect. Usually, the victims are strangers, although the killer may have followed them for a period of time. Thrill killers can abstain from killing for long periods of time and become more successful at killing as they refine their murder methods. Many attempt to commit the perfect crime and believe they will not be caught.

Robert Hansen took his victims to a secluded area, where he would let them loose and then hunt and kill them. In one of his letters to San Francisco Bay Area newspapers in San Francisco, California, the Zodiac Killer wrote "[killing] gives me the most thrilling experience it is even better than getting your rocks off with a girl". Carl Watts was described by a surviving victim as "excited and hyper and clappin' and just making noises like he was excited, that this was gonna be fun" during the 1982 attack. Slashing, stabbing, hanging, drowning, asphyxiating, and strangling were among the ways Watts killed.

==== Comfort ====
Material gain and a comfortable lifestyle are the primary motives of comfort killers. Usually, the victims are family members and close acquaintances. After a murder, a comfort killer will usually wait for a period of time before killing again to allow any suspicions by family or authorities to subside. They often use poison, most notably arsenic, to kill their victims. Female serial killers are often comfort killers, although not all comfort killers are female.

Dorothea Puente killed her tenants for their Social Security checks and buried them in the backyard of her home. H. H. Holmes killed for insurance and business profits. Puente and Holmes had previous records of crimes such as theft, fraud, non-payment of debts, embezzlement and others of a similar nature. Dorothea Puente was finally arrested on a parole violation, having been on parole for a previous fraud conviction. Contract killers ("hitmen") are not classified as such because of third-party killing objectives and detached financial and emotional incentives. This is opposed to a comfort killer who kills for the emotional need for security and material pleasure. Micki Pistorius states that those who kill for financial motivations do so out of a psychological urge to gain security, and that the void they feel will "never be filled".

=== Power/control ===
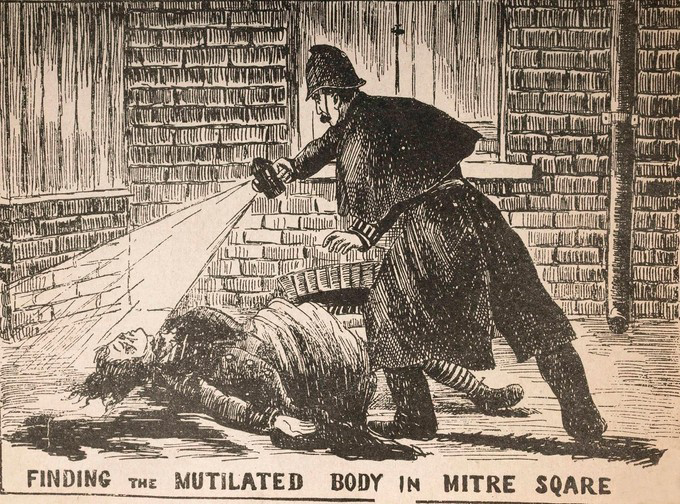
A policeman discovering the body of Catherine Eddowes, one of Jack the Ripper's victims

The main objective for this type of serial killer is to gain and exert power over their victim. Such killers are sometimes abused as children, leaving them with feelings of powerlessness and inadequacy as adults. Many power- or control-motivated killers sexually abuse their victims, but they differ from hedonistic killers in that rape is not motivated by lust (as it would be with a lust murder) but as simply another form of dominating the victim. Ted Bundy is an example of a power/control-oriented serial killer. He traveled around the United States seeking women to control.

=== Media influences ===
Many serial killers claim that a violent culture influenced them to commit murders. During his final interview, Ted Bundy stated that hardcore pornography was responsible for his actions. Others idolise figures for their deeds or perceived vigilante justice, such as Peter Kürten, who idolized Jack the Ripper, or John Wayne Gacy and Ed Kemper, who both idolized the actor John Wayne.

Killers who have a strong desire for fame or to be renowned for their actions desire media attention as a way of validating and spreading their crimes; fear is also a component here, as some serial killers enjoy causing fear. An example is Dennis Rader, who sought attention from the press during his murder spree. David Berkowitz ("Son of Sam") mailed taunting letters to police and New York Daily News columnist Jimmy Breslin, mocking authorities and hinting at future crimes. Such public taunts have been discussed in broader criminological analyses of serial offenders who exhibit desires for admiration, recognition, and validation.

=== Theories ===
==== Biological and sociological ====
Theories for why certain people commit serial murder have been advanced. Some theorists believe the reasons are biological, suggesting serial killers are born, not made, and that their violent behavior is a result of abnormal brain activity. Holmes believes that "until a reliable sample can be obtained and tested, there is no scientific statement that can be made concerning the exact role of biology as a determining factor of a serial killer personality."

The "Fractured Identity Syndrome" (FIS) is a merging of Charles Cooley's "looking glass self" and Erving Goffman's "virtual" and "actual social identity" theories. The FIS suggests a social event, or series of events, during one's childhood results in a fracturing of the personality of the serial killer. The term "fracture" is defined as a small breakage of the personality which is often not visible to the outside world and is only felt by the killer.

"Social Process Theory" has also been suggested as an explanation for serial murder. Social process theory states that offenders may turn to crime due to peer pressure, family and friends. Criminal behavior is a process of interaction with social institutions, in which everyone has the potential for criminal behavior. A lack of family structure and identity could also be a cause leading to serial murder traits. A child used as a scapegoat will be deprived of their capacity to feel guilt. Displaced anger could result in animal torture, as identified in the Macdonald triad, and a further lack of basic identity.

==== Military ====
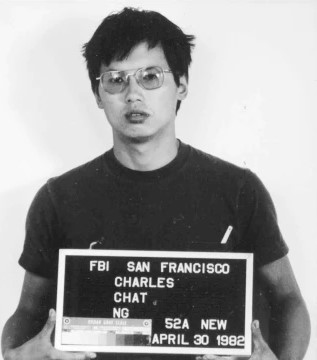
A dishonorably discharged Marine, Charles Ng participated in the kidnapping, sadistic torture, rape, and murder of numerous victims.

The "military theory" has been proposed as an explanation for why serial murderers kill, as some serial murderers have served in the military or related fields. According to Castle and Hensley, 7% of the serial killers studied had military experience. This figure may be a proportional under-representation when compared to the number of military veterans in a nation's total population. For example, according to the United States census for the year 2000, military veterans comprised 12.7% of the U.S. population; in England, it was estimated in 2007 that military veterans comprised 9.1% of the population. Though by contrast, about 2.5% of the population of Canada in 2006 consisted of military veterans.

There are two theories that can be used to study the correlation between serial killing and military training: Applied learning theory states that serial killing can be learned. The military is training for higher kill rates from servicemen while training the soldiers to be desensitized to taking a human life. Social learning theory can be used when soldiers get praised and accommodated for killing. They learn or believe that they learn, that it is acceptable to kill because they were praised for it in the military. Serial killers want accreditation for the work that they have done.

In both military and serial killing, the offender or the soldier may become desensitized to killing as well as compartmentalized; the soldiers do not see enemy personnel as "human" and neither do serial killers see their victims as humans. The theories do not imply that military institutions make a deliberate effort to produce serial killers; to the contrary, all military personnel are trained to recognize when, where, and against whom it is appropriate to use deadly force, which starts with the basic Law of Land Warfare, taught during the initial training phase, and may include more stringent policies for military personnel in law enforcement or security.

== Investigation ==
=== FBI: Issues and practices ===
In 2008, the FBI published a handbook titled Serial Murder which was the product of a symposium held in 2005 to bring together the many issues surrounding serial murder, including its investigation.

==== Identification ====
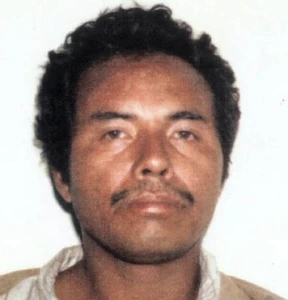
Ángel Maturino Reséndiz, who was an FBI Ten Most Wanted Fugitive

According to the FBI, identifying one, or multiple, murders as being the work of a serial killer is the first challenge an investigation faces, especially if the victim(s) come from a marginalized or high-risk population and is normally linked through forensic or behavioral evidence. Should the cases cross multiple jurisdictions, the law enforcement system in the United States is fragmented and thus not configured to detect multiple similar murders across a large geographic area. Ted Bundy was particularly famous for such geographic exploitations. He used his knowledge about the lack of communication between multiple jurisdictions to avoid arrest and detection. The FBI suggests utilizing databases and increasing interdepartmental communication. Keppel suggests holding multi-jurisdictional conferences regularly to compare cases giving departments a greater chance to detect linked cases and overcome linkage blindness.

One collaboration, the Serial Homicide Expertise and Information Sharing Collaborative, was formed in 2010 and made serial murder data widely accessible after multiple experts combined their databases to aid in research and investigation. Another collaboration, the Radford/FGCU Serial Killer Database Project was proposed at the 2012 FDIAI Annual Conference. Utilizing Radford's Serial Killer Database as a starting point, the new collaboration, hosted by FGCU Justice Studies, has invited and is working in conjunction with other universities to maintain and expand the scope of the database to also include spree and mass murders. Utilizing over 170 data points, multiple-murderer methodology and victimology; researchers and Law Enforcement Agencies can build case studies and statistical profiles to further research the Who, What, Why and How of these types of crimes.

==== Leadership ====
Leadership, or administration, should play a small or virtually non-existent role in the actual investigation past assigning knowledgeable or experienced homicide investigators to lead positions. The administration's role is not to run the investigation but to establish and reaffirm the primary goal of catching the serial killer, as well as provide support for the investigators. The FBI (2008) suggests completing Memorandums of Understanding to facilitate support and commitment of resources from different jurisdictions to an investigation. Egger takes this one step further and suggests completing mutual aid pacts, which are written agreements to provide support to each other in a time of need, with surrounding jurisdictions. Doing this in advance would save time and resources that could be used on the investigation.

==== Organization ====
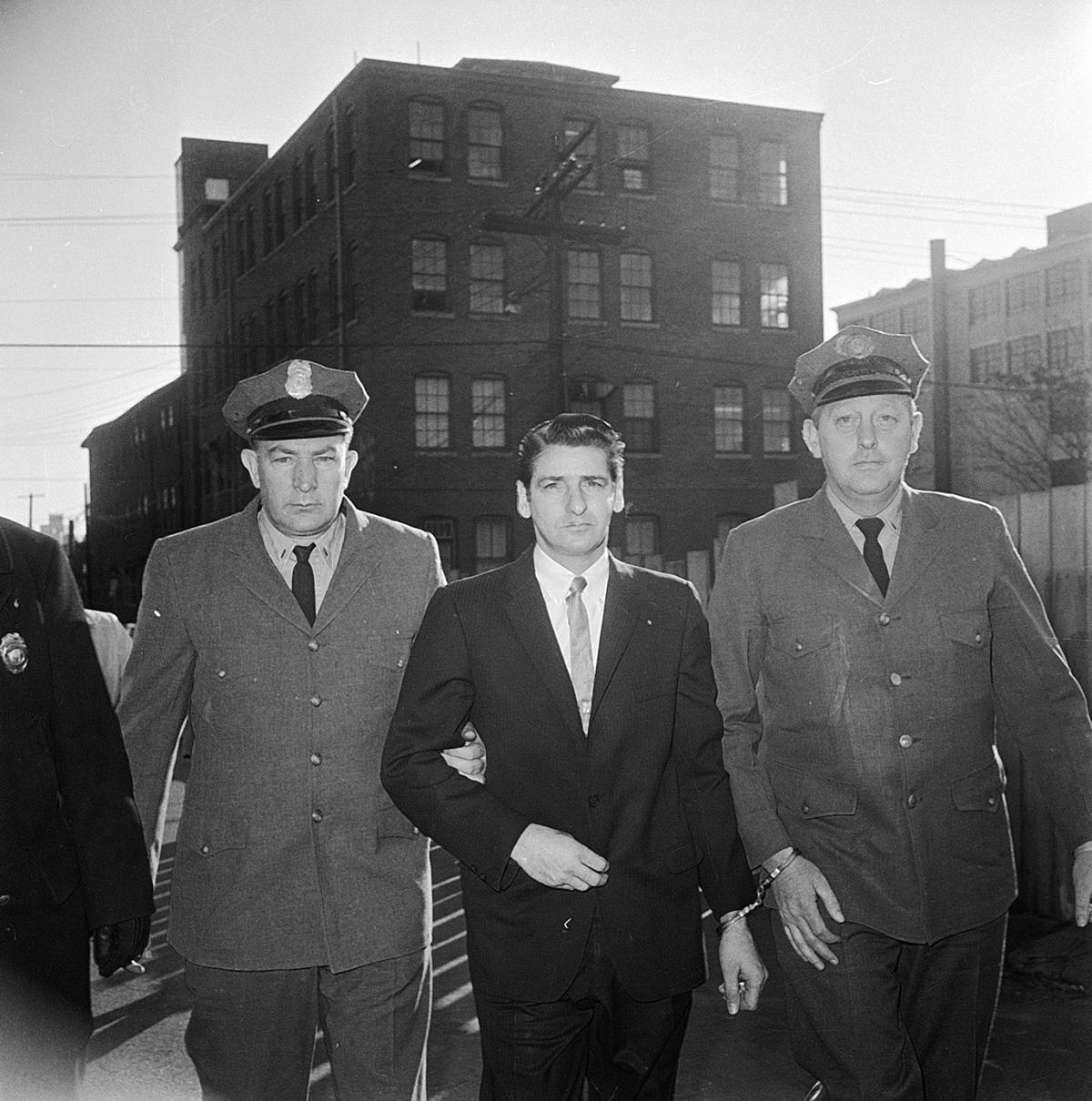
Albert DeSalvo, who claimed to be the "Boston Strangler", after being caught in Lynn, Massachusetts, in 1967

The structural organization of an investigation is key to its success, as demonstrated by the investigation of Gary Ridgway, the Green River Killer. Once a serial murder case was established, a task force was created to track down and arrest the offender. Over the course of the investigation, for various reasons, the task force's organization was radically changed and reorganized multiple times – at one point including more than 50 full-time personnel, and at another, only a single investigator. Eventually, what led to the end of the investigation was a conference of 25 detectives organized to share ideas to solve the case.

The FBI handbook provides a description of how a task force should be organized but offers no additional options on how to structure the investigation. While it appears advantageous to have a full-time staff assigned to a serial murder investigation, it can become prohibitively expensive. For example, the Green River Task Force cost upwards of $2 million per year, and as was witnessed with the Green River Killer investigation, other strategies can prevail where a task force fails. A common strategy, already employed by many departments for other reasons, is the conference, in which departments get together and focus on a specific set of topics. With serial murders, the focus is typically on unsolved cases, with evidence thought to be related to the case at hand.

Similar to a conference is an information clearing-house in which a jurisdiction with a suspected serial murder case collects all of its evidence and actively seeks data that may be related from other jurisdictions. By collecting all of the related information into one place, they provide a central point in which it can be organized and easily accessed by other jurisdictions working toward the goal of arresting an offender and ending the murders. A task force provides for a flexible, organized, framework for jurisdictions depending on the needs of the investigation. Unfortunately due to the need to commit resources (manpower, money, equipment, etc.) for long periods of time it can be an unsustainable option.

In the case of the investigation of Aileen Wournos, the Marion County Sheriff coordinated multiple agencies without any written or formal agreement. While not a specific strategy for a serial murder investigation, in this case the agencies were able to work effectively together toward a common goal. Finally, once a serial murder investigation has been identified, the use of an FBI Rapid Response Team can assist both experienced and inexperienced jurisdictions in setting up a task force. This is completed by organizing and delegating jobs, by compiling and analyzing clues, and by establishing communication between the parties involved.

==== Resource augmentation ====
During the course of a serial murder investigation, it may become necessary to call in additional resources; the FBI defines this as Resource Augmentation. Within the structure of a task force, the addition of a resource should be thought of as either long-term or short-term. If the task force's framework is expanded to include the new resource, then it should be permanent and not removed. For short-term needs, such as setting up roadblocks or canvassing a neighborhood, additional resources should be called in on a short-term basis. The decision of whether resources are needed short or long term should be left to the lead investigator and facilitated by the administration.

The confusion and counter productiveness created by changing the structure of a task force mid investigation is illustrated by the way the Green River Task Force's staffing and structure was changed multiple times throughout the investigation. This made an already complicated situation more difficult, resulting in the delay or loss of information, which allowed Ridgway to continue killing. The FBI model does not take into account that permanently expanding a task force, or investigative structure, may not be possible due to cost or personnel availability. Egger (1998) offers several alternative strategies including; using investigative consultants, or experienced staff to augment an investigative team. Not all departments have investigators experienced in serial murder and by temporarily bringing in consultants, they can educate a department to a level of competence then step out. This would reduce the initially established framework of the investigation team and save the department the cost of retaining the consultants until the conclusion of the investigation.

==== Communication ====
The FBI handbook (2008) and Keppel (1989) both stress communication as paramount. The difference is that the FBI handbook concentrates primarily on communication within a task force, while Keppel makes getting information out to and allowing information to be passed back from patrol officers a priority. The FBI handbook suggests having daily e-mail or in-person briefings for all staff involved in the investigation and providing periodic summary briefings to patrol officers and managers. Looking back on a majority of serial murderer arrests, most are exercised by patrol officers in the course of their everyday duties and unrelated to the ongoing serial murder investigation.

Keppel provides examples of Larry Eyler, who was arrested during a traffic stop for a parking violation, and Ted Bundy, who was arrested during a traffic stop for operating a stolen vehicle. In each case, it was uniformed officers, not directly involved in the investigation, who knew what to look for and took the direct action that stopped the killer. By providing up-to-date (as opposed to periodic) briefings and information to officers on the street the chances of catching a serial killer, or finding solid leads, are increased.

==== Data management ====
A serial murder investigation generates staggering amounts of data, all of which needs to be reviewed and analyzed. A standardized method of documenting and distributing information must be established and investigators must be allowed time to complete reports while investigating leads and at the end of a shift (FBI 2008). When the mechanism for data management is insufficient, leads are not only lost or buried but the investigation can be hindered and new information can become difficult to obtain or become corrupted.

During the Green River Killer investigation, reporters would often find and interview possible victims or witnesses ahead of investigators. The understaffed investigation was unable to keep up the information flow, which prevented them from promptly responding to leads. To make matters worse, investigators believed that the journalists, untrained in interviewing victims or witnesses of crimes, would corrupt the information and result in unreliable leads.

== Memorabilia ==
Notorious serial killers number in the thousands, and a subculture revolves around their legacies. That subculture includes the collection, sale, and display of serial killer memorabilia, dubbed "murderabilia" by Andrew Kahan, one of the most well-known opponents of collectors of serial killer remnants. Kahan is the director of the Mayor's Crime Victims Office in Houston. He is backed by the families of murder victims and "Son of Sam laws" existing in some states that prevent murderers from profiting from the publicity generated by their crimes.

Such memorabilia includes the paintings, writings, and poems of these killers. Recently, marketing has capitalized even more upon interest in serial killers with the rise of various merchandise such as trading cards, action figures, and books. Some serial killers attain celebrity status in the way they acquire fans and may have previous personal possessions auctioned off on websites like eBay. A few examples of this are Ed Gein's 150-pound stolen gravestone and Bobby Joe Long's sunglasses.

== See also ==
- Serial crime
- Serial rape
- List of serial killers by country
- List of serial killers by number of victims
- List of songs about or referencing serial killers

== Bibliography ==
- Arrigo, B.; Griffin, A. (2004). "Serial Murder and the Case of Aileen Wuornos: Attachment Theory, Psychopathy, and Predatory Aggression". Behavioral Sciences & the Law. 22 (3): 375–393. doi:10.1002/bsl.583. PMID 15211558.
- Atwood, Donald J. (February 25, 1992). "Department of Defense Directive AD-A272 176: Use of Deadly Force and the Carrying of Firearms by DoD Personnel Engaged in Law Enforcement and Security Duties" (PDF). DoD. Archived (PDF) from the original on March 28, 2018.
- Bartol, Curt R.; Bartol, Anne M. (2004). Introduction to Forensic Psychology: Research and Application. SAGE Publications. ISBN 978-1-4129-5830-1. Archived from the original on May 14, 2019.
- Brown, Pat (2008). Killing for Sport: Inside the Minds of Serial Killers. Phoenix Books, Inc. ISBN 9781597775755.
- Bruno, Anthony (1993). The Iceman: the True Story of a Cold-Blooded Killer. Delacorte Press Books for Young Readers. ISBN 9780385307789.
- Burkhalter Chmelir, Sandra (2003). "Serial Killers". In Robert Kastenbaum (ed.). Macmillan Encyclopedia of Death and Dying. Vol. 2. New York: Macmillan Reference USA/Thomson/Gale. p. 1. Archived from the original on May 3, 2009.
- Canter, David (1994). Criminal Shadows: Inside the Mind of the Serial Killer. HarperCollins. ISBN 9780002552158. Archived from the original on January 20, 2021.
- Castle, T.; Hensley, C. (2002). "Serial killers with military experience: Applying learning theory to serial murder" (PDF). International Journal of Offender Therapy and Comparative Criminology. 46 (4): 453–465. doi:10.1177/0306624x02464007. PMID 12150084. S2CID 35278358. Archived from the original (PDF) on October 27, 2011.
- Claus, C.; Lindberg, L. (1999). "Serial Murder as a 'Shariar Syndrome'". The Journal of Forensic Psychiatry. 10 (2): 427–435. doi:10.1080/09585189908403694.
- Davenport-Hines, Richard (2004). "Jack the Ripper (fl. 1888), serial killer". Oxford Dictionary of National Biography (online ed.). Oxford University Press. doi:10.1093/ref:odnb/38744. (Subscription, Wikipedia Library access or UK public library membership required.)
- DeFronzo, J; Prochnow, J (2004). "Violent cultural factors and serial homicide by males". Psychological Reports. 94 (1): 104–108. doi:10.2466/pr0.94.1.104-108. PMID 15077753. S2CID 29686594.
- Dobbert, Duane L. (2004). Halting the Sexual Predators Among Us: Preventing Attack, Rape, and Lust Homicide. Greenwood. ISBN 9780275978624. Archived from the original on September 1, 2016.
- Dvorchak, Robert J.; Holewa, Lisa (1991). Milwaukee Massacre: Jeffrey Dahmer and the Milwaukee Murders. Dell Pub. ISBN 9780440212867. Archived from the original on January 20, 2021.
- Egger, Steven A. (1990). Serial Murder: An Elusive Phenomenon. Praeger Publishers Inc. ISBN 9780275929862.<
- Egger, Steven A. (2002). The Killers Among Us: An Examination of Serial Murder and Its Investigation. Prentice Hall. ISBN 9780130179159. Archived from the original on January 20, 2021.
- Farrell, Amanda L.; Keppel, Robert D.; Titterington, Victoria B. (August 2011). "Lethal Ladies: Revisiting What We Know About Female Serial Murderers". Homicide Studies. 15 (3): 228–252. doi:10.1177/1088767911415938. S2CID 144327931.
- Flowers, R. Barri (2012). The Dynamics of Murder: Kill or Be Killed. CRC Press. ISBN 9781439879740. Archived from the original on September 1, 2016.
- Fox, James Alan; Levin, Jack (2005). Extreme Killing: Understanding Serial and Mass Murder. SAGE. ISBN 9780761988571. Archived from the original on September 2, 2016.
- Frei, A.; Völlm, B.; Graf, M.; Dittmann, V. (2006). "Female serial killing: Review and case report". Criminal Behaviour and Mental Health. 16 (33): 167–176. doi:10.1002/cbm.615. PMID 16838388.
- Fulero, Solomon M.; Wrightsman, Lawrence S. (2008). Forensic Psychology. Cengage Learning. ISBN 978-1111804954. Archived from the original on January 20, 2021.
- Geberth, Vernon J. (1995). "Psychopathic sexual sadists: The psychology and psychodynamics of serial killers". Law and Order. 43 (4): 82–86. Archived from the original on January 5, 2020.
- Gennat, Ernst (1930). "Die Düsseldorfer Sexualmorde". Kriminalistische Monatshefte.
- Giannangelo, Stephen J. (1996). The Psychopathology of Serial Murder: A Theory of Violence. Greenwood Publishing Group. ISBN 9780275954345. Archived from the original on January 20, 2021.
- Giannangelo, Stephen J. (2012). Real-life Monsters: A Psychological Examination of the Serial Murderer. ABC-CLIO. ISBN 9780313397844. Archived from the original on January 20, 2021.
- Godwin, Grover Maurice (2008). Hunting Serial Predators. Jones & Bartlett Learning. ISBN 9780763735104.
- Goldberg, Carl; Crespo, Virginia (2003). "A psychological examination of serial killer cinema: The case of copycat". Post Script. 22 (2). ISSN 0277-9897. Archived from the original on June 16, 2018.
- Graysmith, Robert (2007). Zodiac (Reissue ed.). Berkley. ISBN 978-0-425-21218-9.
- Guillen, Tomas (2007). Serial Killers: Issues Explored Through the Green River Murders. Pearson Prentice Hall. ISBN 9780131529663. Archived from the original on January 20, 2021.
- Hamamoto, D (2002). "Empire of death: militarized society and the rise of serial killing and mass murder". New Political Science. 24 (1): 105–120. doi:10.1080/07393140220122662. S2CID 145617529.
- Harrison, Marissa A.; Murphy, Erin A.; Ho, Lavina Y.; Bowers, Thomas G.; Flaherty, Claire V. (2015). "Female serial killers in the United States: means, motives, and makings". The Journal of Forensic Psychiatry & Psychology. 26 (3): 383–406. doi:10.1080/14789949.2015.1007516. S2CID 145149823.
- Hasselt, V. B. Van (1999). Handbook of psychological approaches with violent offenders: Contemporary strategies and issues. Kluwer Academic / Plenum Publishers. ISBN 9780306458453. Archived from the original on January 20, 2021.
- Hale, Robert L. (January 9, 1993). "The Application of Learning Theory to Serial Murder or 'You Too Can Learn to be a Serial Killer'". American Journal of Criminal Justice. 17 (2): 37–45. doi:10.1007/BF02885952. S2CID 144186286. Archived from the original on October 3, 2018.
- Howard, Amanda; Smith, Martin (2004). River of Blood: Serial Killers and Their Victims. Universal. ISBN 978-1-58112-518-4.
- Hickey, Eric W. (2010). Serial murderers and their victims. Wadsworth, Cengage Learning.
- Holmes, Ronald M.; Holmes, Stephen T. (2010). Serial murder (3rd ed.). Thousand Oaks, Sage, California. ISBN 978-1-4129-7442-4.
- Holmes, Ronald M.; Holmes, Stephen T. (1998). Serial Murder (Second ed.). Sage. ISBN 978-0-7619-1367-2. Archived from the original on May 14, 2019.
- Holmes, Ronald M; Holmes, Stephen T (2000). Mass murder in the United States. Prentice Hall. ISBN 978-0-13-934308-7.
- Holmes, Ronald M.; Holmes, Stephen T. (2001). Sex Crimes: Patterns and Behavior (Second ed.). Sage. ISBN 978-0-7619-2417-3. Archived from the original on March 9, 2020.
- Holmes, Ronald M.; Holmes, Stephen T. (2002). Profiling Violent Crimes: An Investigative Tool. Sage. ISBN 978-0-7619-2594-1. Archived from the original on May 14, 2019.
- Hough, Richard M.; McCorkle, Kimberly D. (2016). American Homicide. SAGE Publications. ISBN 978-1439138854. Archived from the original on January 20, 2021.
- Kelleher, Michael D.; Kelleher, C.L. (1998). Murder Most Rare: The Female Serial Killer. Westport, Connecticut: Praeger. ISBN 978-0-275-96003-2. Archived from the original on April 20, 2010 – via Questia.
- Keppel, Robert D. (2000). Serial Murder: Future Implications for Police Investigations. Authorlink Pr. ISBN 9781928704188.
- Kirby, Ashley M. (2009). Juvenile Serial Killers: Descriptive Characteristics and Profiles. Alliant International University, California School of Forensic Psychology, Fresno. Archived from the original on January 20, 2021.
- Linedecker, Clifford L.; Burt, William A. (1990). Nurses who Kill. Windsor. ISBN 978-1-55817-449-8.
- Maccoby, E. E (1992). "The role of parents in the socialization of children: An historical overview". Developmental Psychology. 28 (6): 1006–1017. doi:10.1037/0012-1649.28.6.1006. S2CID 7266774.
- MacCormick, Alex (2003). The Mammoth Book of Maneaters: Over 250 Terrifying True Accounts of Predators from Pre-history to the Present. Running Press. ISBN 9780786711703. Archived from the original on January 20, 2021.
- Mellor, Lee (2012). Cold North Killers: Canadian Serial Murder. Dundurn. ISBN 9781459701243. Archived from the original on January 20, 2021.
- Mitchell, Corey (2006). Evil Eyes. Pinnacle Books. ISBN 9780786016761.
- Morton, RJ (2005). "Serial murder multi-disciplinary perspectives for investigators" (PDF). Federal Bureau of Investigation. Archived from the original on June 15, 2016.
- Mount, George (2007). "Predicting Dangerousness". Journal of Police Crisis Negotiations. 7: 131–133. doi:10.1300/j173v07n01_11. S2CID 216088854.
- Myers, Wade C.; McElroy, Ross; Burton, Karen; Recoppa, Lawrence (1993). "Malignant Sex and Aggression: An Overview of Serial Sexual Homicide". Bulletin of the American Academy of Psychiatry and the Law. 21 (4): 435–451. PMID 8054674.
- Newton, Michael (2006). The Encyclopedia of Serial Killers. Infobase Publishing. ISBN 9780816069873. Archived from the original on June 1, 2020.
- Norder, Dan; Vanderlinden, Wolf; Begg, Paul (2004). Ripper Notes: Madmen, Myths and Magic. Inklings Press. ISBN 9780975912911.
- Peck, Dennis L.; Dolche, Norman Allan (2000). Extraordinary Behavior: A Case Study Approach to Understanding Social Problems. Greenwood. ISBN 978-0-275-97057-4. Archived from the original on May 14, 2019.
- Perri, Frank S.; Lichtenwald, Terrance G. (2010). "The Last Frontier: Myths & The Female Psychopathic Killer" (PDF). Forensic Examiner. 19 (2). Archived (PDF) from the original on July 7, 2011.
- Petherick, Wayne (2005). Serial Crime: Theoretical and Practical Issues in Behavioral Profiling. Elsevier. ISBN 9780080468549. Archived from the original on September 2, 2016.
- Qian, Sima (1993). "Han Dynasty". Records of the Grand Historian: Han dynasty. Vol. I (Revised ed.). Columbia University Press. ISBN 978-0-231-08164-1. Archived from the original on May 14, 2019.
- Ressler, Robert K.; Schachtman, Thomas (1993). Whoever Fights Monsters: My Twenty Years Tracking Serial Killers for the FBI. New York: Macmillan/St. Martin's. ISBN 978-0-312-95044-6.
- Rubinstein, W. D. (2004). Genocide: A History. Pearson Longman. ISBN 9780582506015. Archived from the original on September 10, 2015.
- Rule, Ann (2004). Kiss Me, Kill Me: Ann Rule's Crime Files. Simon and Schuster. ISBN 9781416500032.
- Schechter, Harold (2003). The Serial Killer Files: The Who, What, Where, How, and Why of the World's Most Terrifying Murderers. Ballantine Books. ISBN 978-0-345-47200-7. Archived from the original on May 14, 2019.
- Schechter, Harold (2012). The A to Z Encyclopedia of Serial Killers. Simon and Schuster. ISBN 9781439138854. Archived from the original on September 1, 2016.
- Schlesinger, Louis B. (2000). Serial Offenders: Current Thought, Recent Findings. CRC Press. ISBN 978-0-8493-2236-5.
- Schmid, David (2005). Natural Born Celebrities: Serial Killers in American Culture. University of Chicago Press. ISBN 978-0-226-73867-3. Archived from the original on May 14, 2019.
- Sitpond, M. (2000). Addicted to murder: The true story of Dr Harold Shipman. Virgin Books. ISBN 978-0-7535-0445-1.
- Silva, J. Arturo; Leong, Gregory B.; Ferrari, Michelle M. (2004). "A neuropsychiatric developmental model of serial homicidal behavior". Behavioral Sciences & the Law. 22 (6): 787–799. doi:10.1002/bsl.620. PMID 15568202.
- Singer, S.D; Hensley, C (2004). "Learning theory to childhood and adolescent fire-setting: Can it lead to serial murder". International Journal of Offender Therapy and Comparative Criminology. 48 (4): 461–476. doi:10.1177/0306624X04265087. PMID 15245657. S2CID 5991918.
- Skeem, Jennifer L.; Polaschek, Devon L. L.; Patrick, Christopher J.; Lilienfeld, Scott O. (December 2011). "Psychopathic Personality: Bridging the Gap Between Scientific Evidence and Public Policy". Psychological Science in the Public Interest. 12 (3): 95–162. doi:10.1177/1529100611426706. PMID 26167886.
- Tithecott, R (1997). Of Men and Monsters: Jeffrey Dahmer and the Construction of the Serial Killer. Madison, Wisconsin: The University of Wisconsin Press. ISBN 978-0-299-15680-0. Archived from the original on May 14, 2019.
- Vronsky, Peter (2004). Serial Killers: The Method and Madness of Monsters. Penguin Group/Berkley. ISBN 978-0-425-19640-3.
- Vronsky, Peter (2007). Female Serial Killers: How and Why Women Become Monsters. New York: Berkley Publishing Group. ISBN 978-0-425-21390-2. Archived from the original on May 14, 2019.
- Vronsky, Peter (2013). "Serial Killer Zombie Apocalypse and the Dawn of the Less Dead: An Introduction to Sexual Serial Murder Today", in Serial Killers: True Crime Anthology 2014. RJ Parker Publishing. ISBN 978-1494325893.
- Walsh, Anthony (November 2005). "African Americans and Serial Killing in the Media: The Myth and the Reality". Homicide Studies. 9 (4): 271–291. doi:10.1177/1088767905280080.
- Whittle, Brian; Ritchie, Jean (2000). Prescription for Murder: The True Story of Mass Murderer Dr Harold Frederick Shipman. Warner. ISBN 9780751529982.
- Wilson, W.; Hilton, T. (1998). "Modus operandi of female serial killers". Psychological Reports. 82 (2): 495–498. doi:10.2466/PR0.82.2.495-498. PMID 9621726.
- Wilson, Colin; Seaman, Donald (1992). The Serial Killers: A Study in the Psychology of Violence. True Crime. ISBN 9780863696152. Archived from the original on January 20, 2021.
- Woodhead, Charlotte; Sloggett; Bray, Issy; Bradbury, Jason; McManus, Sally; Meltzer, Howard; Brugha, Terry; Jenkins, Rachel; Greenberg, Neil; Wessely, Simon; Fear, Nicola (2009). "An Estimate of the Veteran Population in England: Based on data from the 2007 Adult Psychiatric Morbidity Survey". Population Trends. 138 (1): 50–54. doi:10.1057/pt.2009.47. PMID 20120251. S2CID 8483631.
- Woods, Paul; Baddeley, Gavin (2009). Saucy Jack: The Elusive Ripper. Ian Allan. ISBN 9780711034105. Archived from the original on January 20, 2021.
- Yardley, Elizabeth; Wilson, David (2015). Female Serial Killers in Social Context: Criminological Institutionalism and the Case of Mary Ann Cotton. Policy Press. ISBN 9781447327639. Archived from the original on January 20, 2021.
