= Peter Vronsky =

Canadian writer and film director

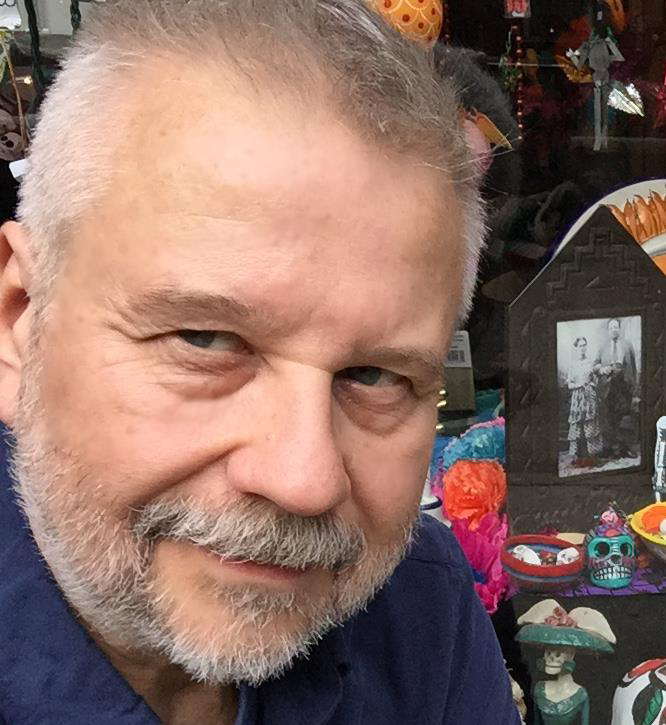
- Peter Vronsky in 2015
- Born: Toronto, Ontario, Canada
- Education: University of Toronto, PhD in espionage in international relations and criminal justice history
- Occupations: Author, historian, film director, professor
- Writing career
- Pen name: Peter Wronski
- Genres: True crime, military history
- Subjects: Serial killers, history, international relations
- Notable works: Serial Killers: The Method and Madness of Monsters; Female Serial Killers: How and Why Women Become Monsters (2007)
- Website: petervronsky.org

Peter Vronsky is a Canadian author, filmmaker, and investigative historian. He holds a PhD in criminal justice history and espionage in international relations from the University of Toronto.

He is the author of the bestseller true crime histories Serial Killers: The Method and Madness of Monsters (2004); Female Serial Killers: How and Why Women Become Monsters; and Sons of Cain: A History of Serial Killers From the Stone Age to the Present (2018), which was a New York Times Editors' Choice; and American Serial Killers: The Epidemic Years 1950–2000 (2021), a history exploring the epidemic surge of serial killers in the second half of the 20th century.

Vronsky is the creator of a body of formal video and electronic artworks and new media. He is the director of several feature films, including Bad Company (1980) and Mondo Moscow (1992).

He has also worked professionally in the motion picture and television industry as a producer and cinematographer in the field of documentary production and news broadcasting with CNN, CTV, CBC, RAI and other global television networks in North America and overseas.

He currently lectures at Toronto Metropolitan University's History Department in the history of international relations, terrorism, espionage, the American Civil War, and the Third Reich.

He consults as an investigative criminal historian to a number of law enforcement cold case homicide units including the New York City Police Department, New York State Police, and Bergen County, New Jersey's Prosecutor's Office.

== Education ==
While studying at the University of Toronto in the 1970s, Vronsky was a member of the University's Film Board (Hart House) and the Toronto Filmmakers Coop. At the Toronto Filmmakers Coop, he studied with Canadian film directors Don Shebib, Clarke Mackey, and Peter Pearson. Vronsky dropped out of the University of Toronto at the end of his second year to pursue filmmaking full-time.

Vronsky returned to the University of Toronto as a full-time student from 2003 to 2010, completing the following degrees:

- University of Toronto, Trinity College, Honours B.A., 2003.
- University of Toronto, Graduate School, M.A. (History) 2004.
- University of Toronto, Graduate School, Ph.D. (History), 2010.

== Biography ==
=== 1970s ===
During this period, Vronsky was a writer and film reviewer for the University of Toronto's newspaper The Varsity as well as Canada's national film magazine Cinema Canada.

He wrote and directed two thirty-minute short drama films starring Paul Young from the Canadian punk rock band the Cardboard Brains: American Nights (1976) and The Sheep-Eaters (1977). He received several Canada Council and Ontario Arts Council grants, and directed and produced a thirty-minute music documentary special on punk rock for CBC Television. Titled Crash'n'Burn (Dada's Boys) (1977), (Note: Not to be confused with Ross McLaren's independent film Crash 'n' Burn, made the same year on the same subject.) the documentary featured the Viletones, Teenage Head, The Dishes, The Ramones, and Dead Boys; it filmed at CBGB in New York and New Yorker Theatre and Crash'n'Burn in Toronto.

Vronsky produced and directed a feature film, Bad Company (1980). He worked as an assistant director on the Canadian feature films Nothing Personal (1979), The Last Chase (1979), and Screwballs (1981).

Vronsky frequently collaborated with documentary filmmaker Peter Lynch on Video Culture International projects and with horror film director Tibor Takacs who, before he left for Hollywood, worked as a cinematographer and art director on several Vronsky films.

=== 1980s ===
In the 1980s, Vronsky created numerous video art tapes and formal video installations, exhibited in Canada and internationally in Tokyo, Paris, Rome, Amsterdam, New York, and London. He was the Artist-in-Residence with Sony Corporation at Video/Culture International, 1983.

He frequently worked as an undercover video specialist – field producer with CBC's The Fifth Estate and CTV's W5. In 1984–1985 during the pioneering period of LaserDisc development, Vronsky was the Head of Interactive Laser Optical Software Development, Sony Corporation-Video/Culture, and the Project Director of the Berlin Wall Videodisc, Sony Canada-Image Over Time, 1985. He worked as a field producer/cameraman for CNN International, Rome Bureau, 1986–1990.

Vronsky was the producer-director of Russian Rock Underground (1988), a thirty-minute music television special on underground ("unofficial") rock music in the Soviet Union, featuring Boris Grebenshchikov, Televizor, Zvuki Mu and Auktion.

=== 1990s ===
Vronsky was the writer-producer-director of Mondo Moscow, a feature-length documentary on incipient Stalinism and underground culture in the USSR, 1990.

In 1991, Vronsky investigated Lee Harvey Oswald's activities in the USSR in 1959–1962 and was the first Westerner to interview Oswald's friends, lovers, and acquaintances in Russia.

Vronsky was the cameraman-line producer on The Hunt for Red Mercury, an investigative one-hour documentary (Discovery Channel – CTV) on nuclear weapons material smuggling in Chechnya, 1992. He was the writer-director of The Uncanadians, a NFB feature documentary 1994–1995 (but withdrew his name from the director's credit in a dispute with the National Film Board over the film's controversial contents). Vronsky was the Head of English Language Production, Panavideo, Venice Italy – service producer for Italy's national television network, RAI, 1997–1999.

=== 2000s ===
Vronsky was the Queens Park/Toronto Bureau Chief at E-Press, Canada's first online news streaming service, 2000 and the Broadband Content Specialist, Canada-Invest.com, financial news streaming service, 2000–2001.

He was the director of photography on the feature-length music documentaries, Life Could Be A Dream (Bravo Television, 2002) and I'll Fly Away Home (Bravo Television, 2004).

He authored two crime history books, Serial Killers The Method and Madness of Monsters (Berkley-Penguin Books, 2004) and Female Serial Killers: How and Why Women Become Monsters (Berkley-Penguin Books, 2007).

His 2011 book Ridgeway: The American Fenian Invasion and the 1866 Battle That Made Canada, is the definitive history of Canada's first modern battle, the Battle of Ridgeway, fought against Irish American Fenian insurgents who invaded across the border from the United States on the eve of Canadian Confederation shortly after the American Civil War.

In 2015, Leah McLaren, writing in The Globe and Mail, reported on the strange disappearance in Cambodia of Dave Walker, a friend of Vronsky's. According to McLaren, Vronsky was working hard to determine what happened to Walker, when the Canadian government seemed to want his story to be forgotten. Walker had told Vronsky that he had worked as an advisor for the Canadian Security Intelligence Service (CSIS) ferreting out genocidal Khmer Rouge perpetrators infiltrating Canada among legitimate refugees from Cambodia during the 1980s and 1990s. Vronsky suspected this could have played a role in his death in Cambodia.

=== 2020s ===
In 2017, he was chosen as the Writer-In-Residence at the Toronto Public Library.

Vronsky is currently writing American Werewolf: The True Story of the Torso Serial Killer Confessions based on a series of prison interviews he is conducting with the notorious serial killer Richard Cottingham. In January 2020, Vronsky revealed that Cottingham, who has been incarcerated since 1980 in the Trenton State Prison for six murders committed between 1967–1980, had recently confessed to an additional three unsolved murders of school girls in New Jersey 1968–1969. In 2021, Vronsky appeared on Joe Berlinger's Netflix show, Crime Scene: The Times Square Killer, about Cottingham.

== Books published ==
- Serial Killers: The Method and Madness of Monsters (Berkley-Penguin Books, 2004)
- Female Serial Killers: How and Why Women Become Monsters (Berkley-Penguin Books, 2007)
- Ridgeway: The American-Fenian Invasion and the 1866 Battle that made Canada (2011)
- Sons of Cain: A History of Serial Killers from the Stone Age to the Present (2018)
- American Serial Killers: The Epidemic Years, 1950–2000 (2021)
