= Arnt Simensen =

Norwegian footballer (1899–1947)

Personal information
- Date of birth: 7 September 1899
- Date of death: 10 January 1947 (aged 47)

International career
Years	Team	Apps	(Gls)
1921–1923	Norway	7	(0)

Arnt Simensen (7 September 1899 – 10 January 1947) was a Norwegian footballer. He played in seven matches for the Norway national football team from 1921 to 1923.
