= Jeff Dolven =

American academic and poet

- Education: Yale University; University of Oxford
- Occupations: Academic, poet
- Employer: Princeton University

Jeff Dolven is an American academic and poet. He is a professor of English at Princeton University, and the author of four books, one of which is a collection of his poems, and one of which was written in twenty-four hours.

== Career ==
Dolven graduated from Yale University, where he earned a bachelor's degree in philosophy. He was a Rhodes scholar at the University of Oxford, earned a PhD in English from Yale, and was a junior fellow at the Harvard Society of Fellows. He taught for a year at Brandeis University as a visiting assistant professor and joined the faculty at Princeton in 2001. At Princeton he has served as Behrman Professor of the Humanities and Acting Chair of the Department of English, and was the founding director of the Interdisciplinary Doctoral Program in the Humanities. He is also an editor at large at Cabinet magazine.

Dolven has also received fellowships from the American Council of Learned Societies, the Stanford Humanities Center, the American Philosophical Society, and the Guggenheim Foundation, and has been a fellow at the MacDowell Colony and Trinity College, Cambridge.

== Works ==
- Dolven, Jeff (2007). Scenes of Instruction in Renaissance Romance. Chicago, Illinois, U.S.: University of Chicago Press. ISBN 9780226155364. OCLC 928978642.
- Dolven, Jeff (2013). Speculative Music: Poems. Louisville, Kentucky: Sarabande Books. ISBN 9781936747580. OCLC 812258745.
- Dolven, Jeff (2017). Senses of Style: Poetry Before Interpretation. Chicago, Illinois, U.S.: University of Chicago Press. ISBN 9780226517087. OCLC 975443565.
- Dolven, Jeff (2018). Take Care. Brooklyn, New York, U.S.: Cabinet Books, 2017. ISBN 9781932698794. OCLC 999606053.
