= Serial Killers: The Method and Madness of Monsters =

2004 book by Peter Vronsky

- Author: Peter Vronsky
- Language: English
- Genre: True crime History
- Publisher: Berkley Books Penguin Group
- Publication date: 2004
- English publication date: 2004
- Pages: 412
- ISBN: 0-425-19640-2
- OCLC: 55671515

Serial Killers: The Method and Madness of Monsters (2004) is a non-fiction true crime history by Peter Vronsky, a criminal justice historian. It surveys the history of serial homicide, its culture, psychopathology, and investigation from the Roman Empire to the early 2000s. The book describes the rise of serial murder from its first early recorded instances in ancient Rome to medieval and Renaissance Europe, and Victorian Britain, and its rise and escalation in the United States and elsewhere in the world, in the postmodern era. The book also surveys a range of theoretical approaches to serial killers interspersed with dozens of detailed case studies of both notorious and lesser known serial murderers, illustrating the theory in practice. Considered by some a definitive history of serial homicide, this was the book serial killer Dennis Rader, the BTK Killer, was reading when he was arrested in 2005.

== Outline ==
Serial Killers is divided into three parts: Part one covers the history of serial murder from its ancient roots to approximately the mid-1960s, when Vronsky argues it became popular in its postmodernity. Vronsky proposes that modern culture, media, and society degrade certain classes of people in the perception of homicidal psychopaths, who serially target and murder them in an attempt to satisfy increasingly addictive sexual, hedonistic fantasies. Vronsky points to the high proportion of street prostitutes, runaway youths, cruising homosexuals, or people who are homeless, impoverished, disabled, or elderly among serial killer victims; i.e., victims who are often characterized as society's "throwaways". Vronsky argues that only the presence of children and young college girls among preferred victims of serial killers raise concerns about these predators in society at large. He reviews several sources of statistical data on serial homicide, its patterns, and trends, particularly in the United States, and explores the myth of the recent "serial killer epidemic".

Part 2 focuses on the psychopathology of serial killers, their evolution from child to adult, and the various emerging and evolving categories and profiles of serial offenders. Vronsky points out that law enforcement, psychologists, psychiatrists, and criminologists disagree among themselves as to how to categorize the broad range of offender types, and explores some of the different approaches, all illustrated with case study examples.

Part 3 focuses on the investigation of serial homicide, particularly on the various profiling systems from the FBI's "crime scene analysis" profiling, to British law enforcement's "psychological profiling", and Canadian police development of "geographic profiling". Vronsky explores the pros and cons of the various systems with case study examples of how profiling has both succeeded and failed in homicide investigations.

Serial Killers concludes with a chapter based on FBI studies and statements by serial killers and a few survivors of serial killer attacks as how to best survive an encounter with a serial killer.
