= Arnt Rindal =

Norwegian diplomat

Arnt Magne Rindal (28 June 1938 – 26 December 2015) was a Norwegian diplomat.

He was a cand.philol. (Master of Arts) by education. He started working for the Norwegian Ministry of Foreign Affairs in 1966. He served in the Soviet Union, the United States and at the NATO delegation in Brussels. He was a head of department in the Ministry of Foreign Affairs from 1988 to 1991, Norway's ambassador to Poland from 1991 to 1996, and acting deputy under-secretary of state in the Ministry of Foreign Affairs from 1996 to 1999. He was then the Norway's ambassador to Romania (and Bulgaria and Moldova) from 1999 to 2003 and Portugal from 2003 to 2006.
