= Lipid IVA 4-amino-4-deoxy-L-arabinosyltransferase =

Class of enzymes

Identifiers
- EC no.: 2.4.2.43

Databases
- IntEnz: IntEnz view
- BRENDA: BRENDA entry
- ExPASy: NiceZyme view
- KEGG: KEGG entry
- MetaCyc: metabolic pathway
- PRIAM: profile
- PDB structures: RCSB PDB PDBe PDBsum
Search
- PMC: articles
- PubMed: articles
- NCBI: proteins

Lipid IVA 4-amino-4-deoxy-L-arabinosyltransferase (EC 2.4.2.43, undecaprenyl phosphate-alpha-L-Ara4N transferase, 4-amino-4-deoxy-L-arabinose lipid A transferase, polymyxin resistance protein PmrK, arnT (gene)) is an enzyme with systematic name 4-amino-4-deoxy-alpha-L-arabinopyranosyl ditrans, octacis-undecaprenyl phosphate:lipid IVA 4-amino-4-deoxy-L-arabinopyranosyltransferase. This enzyme catalyses the following chemical reaction

(1) 4-amino-4-deoxy-alpha-L-arabinopyranosyl ditrans, octacis-undecaprenyl phosphate + alpha-Kdo-(2->4)-alpha-Kdo-(2->6)-lipid A $\rightleftharpoons$ alpha-Kdo-(2->4)-alpha-Kdo-(2->6)-[4-P-L-Ara4N]-lipid A + ditrans, octacis-undecaprenyl phosphate
(2) 4-amino-4-deoxy-alpha-L-arabinopyranosyl ditrans, octacis-undecaprenyl phosphate + lipid IVA $\rightleftharpoons$ lipid IIA + ditrans, octacis-undecaprenyl phosphate
(3) 4-amino-4-deoxy-alpha-L-arabinopyranosyl ditrans, octacis-undecaprenyl phosphate + alpha-Kdo-(2->4)-alpha-Kdo-(2->6)-lipid IVA $\rightleftharpoons$ 4'-alpha-L-Ara4N-alpha-Kdo-(2->4)-alpha-Kdo-(2->6)-lipid IVA + ditrans, octacis-undecaprenyl phosphate

This integral membrane protein is present in the inner membrane of certain Gram negative endobacteria.
