= Mike Aamodt =

American industrial and organizational psychology professor at Radford University

Michael G. Aamodt
- Born: September 1, 1957 (age 68)
- Education: Pepperdine University (B.A.); University of Arkansas (M.A., Ph.D.)

Michael G. Aamodt (born September 1, 1957) is an American industrial and organizational psychology professor at Radford University.

== Career ==
Aamodt is actively involved in SHRM and was the 2009 president of the New River Valley chapter of SHRM as well as the advisor for the Radford University Chapter. He received his B.A. in psychology from Pepperdine University in Malibu, California and both his M.A. and Ph.D. from the University of Arkansas.

== Areas of research ==
- Police psychology
- Industrial and Organizational Psychology
- Forensic psychology

== Publications ==
=== Books ===
- Industrial/Organizational Psychology: An Applied Approach
- Research in Law Enforcement Selection
- Law Enforcement Selection: Research Summaries
- Understanding Statistics: A Guide for I/O Psychologists and Human Resource Professionals
- Human Relations in Business

=== Journals ===
- Applied HRM Research
- Journal of Police and Criminal Psychology
- Criminal Justice and Behavior
