= Arnt Aamodt =

Norwegian trade unionist and politician

Arnt Aamodt (1 October 1871 – 22 July 1936) was a Norwegian trade unionist and politician for the Labour Party. He was best known as treasurer of the Norwegian Union of Iron and Metalworkers from 1908 to 1931.

== Early life ==
He was born in Fet. As a young man he moved to Kristiania, where he started as a mechanic at Myrens Verksted in 1892. He joined the Mechanics Association and by extension the Norwegian Union of Iron and Metalworkers.

== Career ==
He was a member of the secretariat of the Norwegian Confederation of Trade Unions from 1907, and served as treasurer of the Union of Iron and Metalworkers from 1908 to 1931. Aamodt was a member of Oslo city council for six years, and a central board member of the Labour Party for one period.

Eventually, Aamodt came under attack from a communist opposition in his union. In 1929, he was accused of obfuscating the accounts. Investments done by the union also came under scrutiny. A formal motion to replace Aamodt because he was a freemason, garnered 30 votes, but not a majority. Josef Larsson emerged as a leading critic, and spearheaded an internal scrutinizing committee. More of the criticism turned towards expenses for food, drinks and representation that Aamodt and the union leader Alfred Melgaard had spent. A power struggle broke out, lasting until 1931.

At the Mechanics Association congress that year, a formal motion was lodged to exclude Aamodt from the union. Shortly after, the Union of Iron and Metalworkers held their congress. Historian Finn Olstad called the congress a palace revolution, where Aamodt and Melgaard were accused for "promoting fascism", but also defended for their meticulous bookkeeping. Although Aamodt took the chair and defended himself, in the end he faced the reality that his period of treasurer was over. A solution was crafted in the backrooms, in which Melgaard and Aamodt were allowed to "retire". The congress formally decided to clear them of any allegations, in a 52–42 vote, and granted them an annual pension of 2500 kr though an 84–34 vote. Josef Larsson was not able to gather enough support to become the new leader, nor treasurer, but did get elected as secretary with a 59–57 vote.

Aamodt was also a board member of Arbeidernes landsbank and Norsk forening for sosialt arbeid. He died at the age of 64.

Trade union offices
Preceded by Hans Østerholt	Treasurer of the Norwegian Union of Iron and Metalworkers; 1908–1931	Succeeded by Hans Hegg
