= Arnt Dolven =

Norwegian politician (1892–1954)

Arnt Maurits Dolven (21 October 1892 – 29 July 1954) was a Norwegian agronomist and politician for the Agrarian Party.

He was born at Dolven in Brunlanes Municipality as a son of farmers Lauritz Olsen Dolven (1856–1915) and Johanne Marie Johansen (1858–1935). He finished middle school in 1909, then Fosnes Agricultural School in 1912 and the Norwegian College of Agriculture in 1917. In the same year he was hired as municipal agronomist in Sandar Municipality, but he moved to become a teacher at Eidsvoll Folk High School. In 1918 he became a rations inspector in Vestfold county, but from 1919 to 1927 he worked at the Norwegian College of Agriculture. From 1928 to 1940 he managed the state grain supplies of Oslo and Aker, located at Sinsen, and from 1940 to 1945 he managed Buskerud Agricultural School. From 1949 to his death he managed the state grain supplies in Gjøvik.

He was elected as a deputy representative to the Parliament of Norway in 1936 from the constituency Akershus and was a member of the municipal council of Aker Municipality from 1937 to 1940. He chaired the county party chapter from 1935 to 1940, and was a national board member of the Agrarian Party from 1934 to 1940. He was later proclaimed an honorary member. He also chaired the Aker and Oslo Agrarian Association from 1930 to 1936.

Dolven was also a supervisory council member of Fellesslakteriet and Felleskjøpet (1920–1928), Nationen (1931–1940), the Norwegian Automobile Federation and Norsk Bilforsikring. He resided in Gjøvik when he died in 1954, only 62 years old.
