= The Scenics =

Canadian band

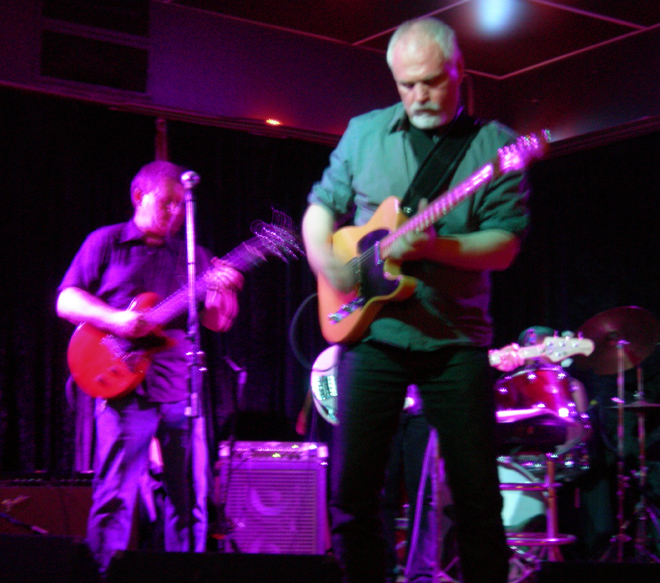
- The Scenics on stage in Hamilton, Ontario; April 2008

Background information
- Origin: Toronto, Ontario, Canada
- Genres: post punk , art rock
- Years active: 1976–1982; 2008–present
- Label: Dream Tower
- Members: Andy Meyers; Ken Badger; Mark Perkell
- Website: www.thescenics.bandcamp.com

The Scenics are a band from Toronto, Ontario, Canada, active from 1976 to 1982, and from 2008 to the present.

== History (1976–1982) ==
The Scenics were among the first Toronto punk bands, started when Ken Badger answered Andy Meyers music store ad in July 1976. Their style incorporates punk rock, post-punk, and art punk and features compositions by both Meyers and Badger.

"The most creative, the most original, and the most daring band in that original Toronto scene" Colin Brunton, director, The Last Pogo.

"These underground icons merged Television's guitar work, Big Star's pop prowess, Pere Ubu's dementia, & the Ramones' urgency.” Jonathon Cummins, Montreal Mirror

Their first two shows, with drummer Mike Cusheon, were in December 1976 and May 1977, both for audiences of young teens. When Cusheon left in the spring of 1977, Andy's high school friend Mark French agreed to play drums on a studio demo. French later went on to record and tour with Canadian roots music band Blue Rodeo.

The trio recorded 10 originals at Mushroom Sound, in Toronto's Annex, a four track studio run by Barry Steinburg. In 2016, five of these recordings were released on the LP “In The Summer: Studio recordings 1977/78”.

=== First lineup ===
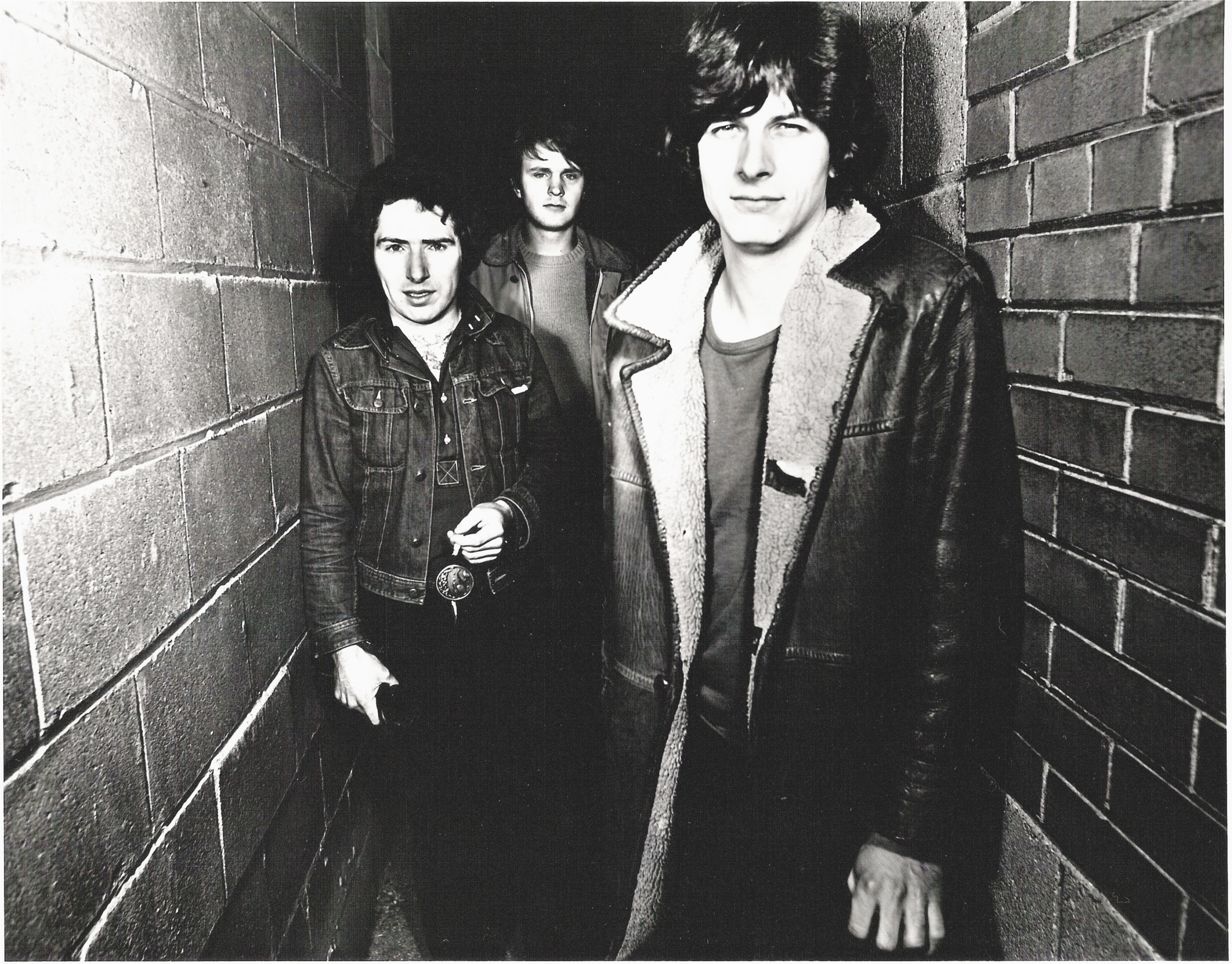
Andy Meyers, Brad Cooper, Ken Badger in 1979. Photo by Rodney Bowes

After finishing this recording, an ad placed in a music store found them drummer Brad Cooper, who stayed in the band till 1980. They began practicing four nights a week, a habit that would continue throughout that time.

In the summer of 1977, Meyers dropped off a cassette for promoter Gary Topp at the New Yorker Theatre. The New Yorker was a rep cinema, and Gary and his partner Gary Cormier ("The Garys") had recently built a stage and begun to book bands, including the Ramones. Topp was excited by their recording and booked the Scenics to open for Talking Heads at The New Yorker on September 16, 1977.

The Scenics began to play shows around town in August- at the Beverly Tavern, David's Discotheque, and a private party for a film producer. After the Talking Heads show, the Scenics returned to Mushroom Sound to record 6 songs with drummer Cooper's more robust style. Three of these songs were later released on In The Summer.

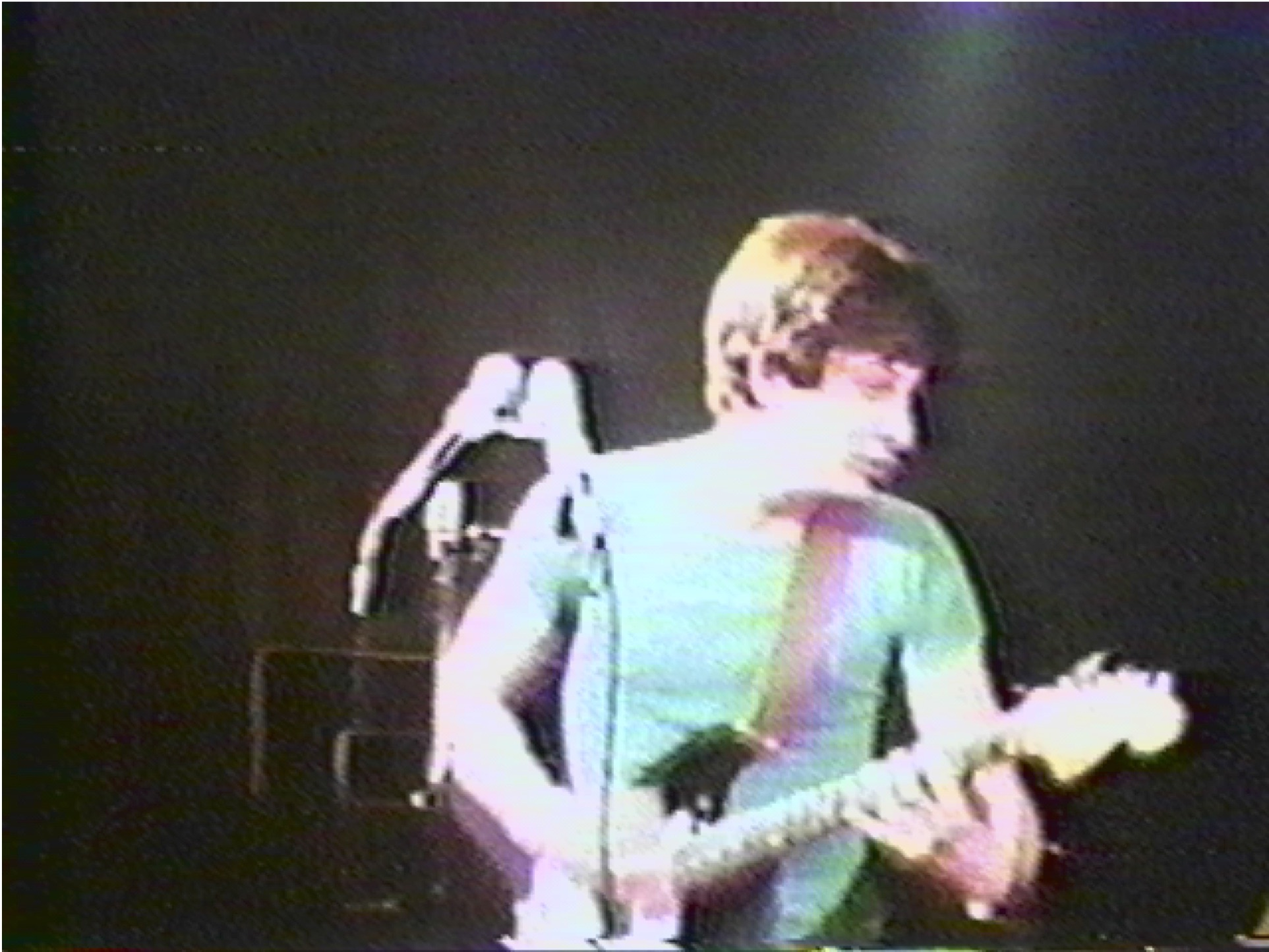
Ken Badger playing at the Last Pogo, Dec 1978, Horseshoe Tavern Toronto.

The Scenics continued to play shows at Toronto Punk venues. They played with the Viletones, Simply Saucer, The Demics, The Government, Telephone (punk from France) among others. In the spring of 1978 a live set and interviews were filmed for Mystery Train, a 30 minute cable television show. In the summer of 1978, The Scenics opened for The Troggs. In the fall of 1978, they recorded six songs at Kincke Sound, an 8 track studio. Four of these surfaced on In The Summer.

==== The Last Pogo ====
In December 1978 The Scenics played "The Last Pogo", two nights that marked the end of promoters "The Garys" run at the Horseshoe Tavern. The first night was filmed by Colin Brunton, and both nights were recorded by Toronto label Bomb Records. Brunton's 30 minute film The Last Pogo, featuring footage of seven bands from the concert (The Scenics perform Badger's "I Wanna Touch") as well as interview footage, was premiered in September 1979 at a Toronto concert by The Gang of Four and the Buzzcocks. A live album of The Last Pogo, produced by Keith Elshaw, came out on Bomb Records in 1979. Two Scenics songs, "I Killed Marx" and "In The Summer" are featured.

In March 1979, The Scenics went into Comfort Sound to record their first LP, produced by Elshaw. They recorded 10 originals and two covers. Seduced by hearing more fleshed-out arrangements recorded in an eight track studio, The Scenics decided to add a second guitarist. Mike Young, who they had played with once very early in their run, joins the band.

=== Second lineup ===
In January 1980, Brad Cooper leaves. Mark Perkell, who Meyers first played music with when they were 14, comes in on drums. Young switches to bass and Badger and Meyers become full-time guitarists.

==== First LP and 45 ====
In the summer of 1980 the Underneath the Door LP comes out on Bomb Records. Young, dissatisfied with playing bass, quits. Ken Fox, later of Jason and the Scorchers and now longtime Fleshtones bassist, comes in. In September The Scenics take part in the "Bomb Tour 80". Over a series of weekends 4 bands play one nighters at eight universities throughout southern Ontario. Many of these are the first "punk" shows booked in these venues.

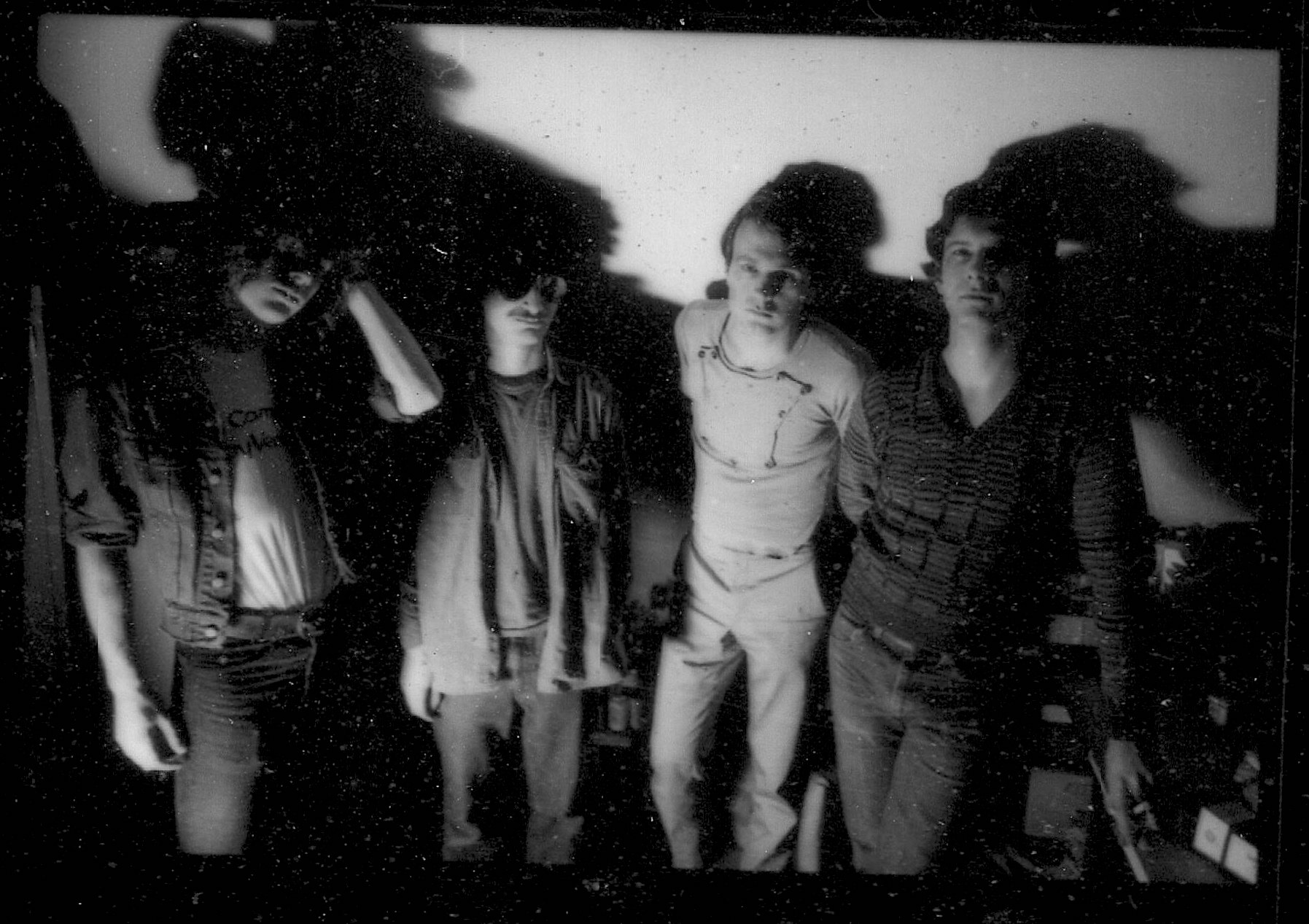
Ken Fox, Mark Perkell, Andy Meyers, Ken Badger, 1981. Photo by Mike Young.

In October 1980, the Scenics go into Captain Audio studio and record 6 songs. Two of them, Meyers' "Karen" and Badger's "See Me Smile", are pressed onto a 45 on their own "Scenic Route" label. Most of the other songs recorded have been lost. The "Karen/See Me Smile" 45 came out in early 1981. By then Ken and his wife are living three hours out of Toronto, where she is working as a teacher. The Scenics continue to write songs and play shows in Toronto, London, and Buffalo, New York, but with the Badgers starting a family, the band breaks up in the fall of 1981. They get together and do one last set opening for Ken Fox's band The Raving Mojos in the spring of 1982.

With Ken Badger raising his family north of Toronto, and Andy Meyers soon married and with children of his own, Ken and Andy remain in very sporadic contact, especially when Andy and his family move to Canada's West Coast in 1988.

== History (2007–present) ==
In 2007, Ken Badger mails a dozen Scenics cassettes recorded live and in rehearsal in the late 1970s to Meyers in British Columbia. (The Scenics have 300 hours of live and basement recordings that had remained in Ken's possession.) Meyers hadn't heard the Scenics for years. He played through several of the tapes one weekend and was moved by what he heard. Badger and he started talking on the phone. In 2008, The Scenics released a CD of 1977–1981 live material called How Does It Feel to Be Loved? The Scenics play the Velvet Underground. The album was distributed by Scratch and Sonic Unyon and made the top 30 in National Canadian Campus radio, and "Year's Best" lists in the Village Voice and Detroit Metro Times, among others. The group reformed with Mark Perkell on drums and Mike Young on bass and played their first show in 26 years at the Horseshoe Tavern, opening for Carla Bozulich in April 2008. They played another handful of shows around a NXNE festival show in June of that year. The NXNE film festival ended with double bill of The Last Pogo film (first screening since 1979) and Scenics' "Waiting for my Man" video (by Quebecois filmmaker Chet Lebeaux).

In September 2008, The Last Pogo film (featuring Toronto bands the Scenics, Viletones, Teenage Head, the Ugly, Cardboard Brains, Mods, and the Secrets) is released on DVD by the Scenics' label Dream Tower Records. The "Special Feature" is 7 unreleased Scenics performances on video from the "Mystery Train" filming of 1978.

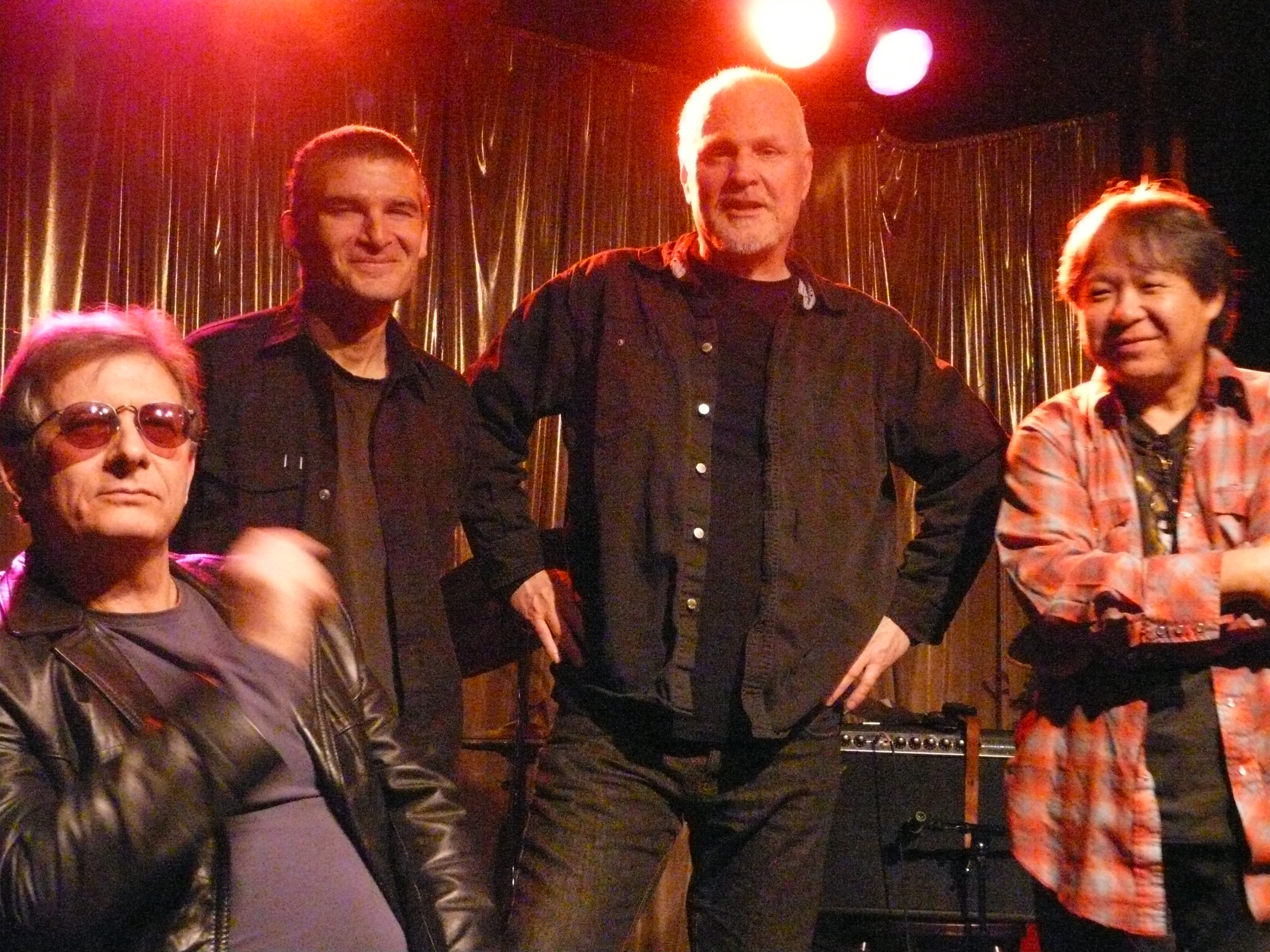
Ken Badger, Mark Perkell, Andy Meyers, Mike Young of The Scenics at "This Ain't Hollywood", Hamilton, Ontario 2009

In December 2008, The Scenics played at the Last Pogo's 30th anniversary at the Horseshoe Tavern with several other bands. The event is filmed by Colin Brunton. As well, the band went into #9 Studio and recorded 14 songs.

In October 2009, the band released another compilation from their vaults, Sunshine World (Studio Recordings 1977-78) on CD. The CD had limited distribution, but to promote the release the band performed dates in Ontario and Quebec. "Do The Wait" was pulled from the album to be featured in May 2010's Protopunk themed cover CD from the UK music mag UNCUT, along with music by the New York Dolls, MC5, The Flamin' Groovies and the Stooges.

=== Dead Man Walks Down Bayview ===
In 2012 the 2008 recordings from #9 Studio were finished and released on LP as Dead Man Walks Down Bayview on DreamTower Records. The album featured songs written over the last 20 years, including 5 that the Scenics had often played live in 1980 and 1981.The band got together for shows in Southern Ontario and Quebec.

In 2013, directors Colin Brunton and Kire Papputts release The Last Pogo Jumps Again a full length documentary on the Toronto punk scene then and now. Badgers' song "O Boy" is featured, as well as interviews with Badger and Meyers.

In 2014, the CD "Talking Songs" is released by "Scattered Bodies" (Andy Meyers with composer/vocalist Susheela Dawne and celebrated poet, Brian Brett). Funded by a Canada Council for the Arts grant, the album sets Brett's texts to music. The musical beds were created by Meyers from a wide array of samples pulled from Scenics cassettes 1976-81. The album was recorded at Meyers' Allowed Sound Studio, which he opened in 1999.

=== In The Summer ===
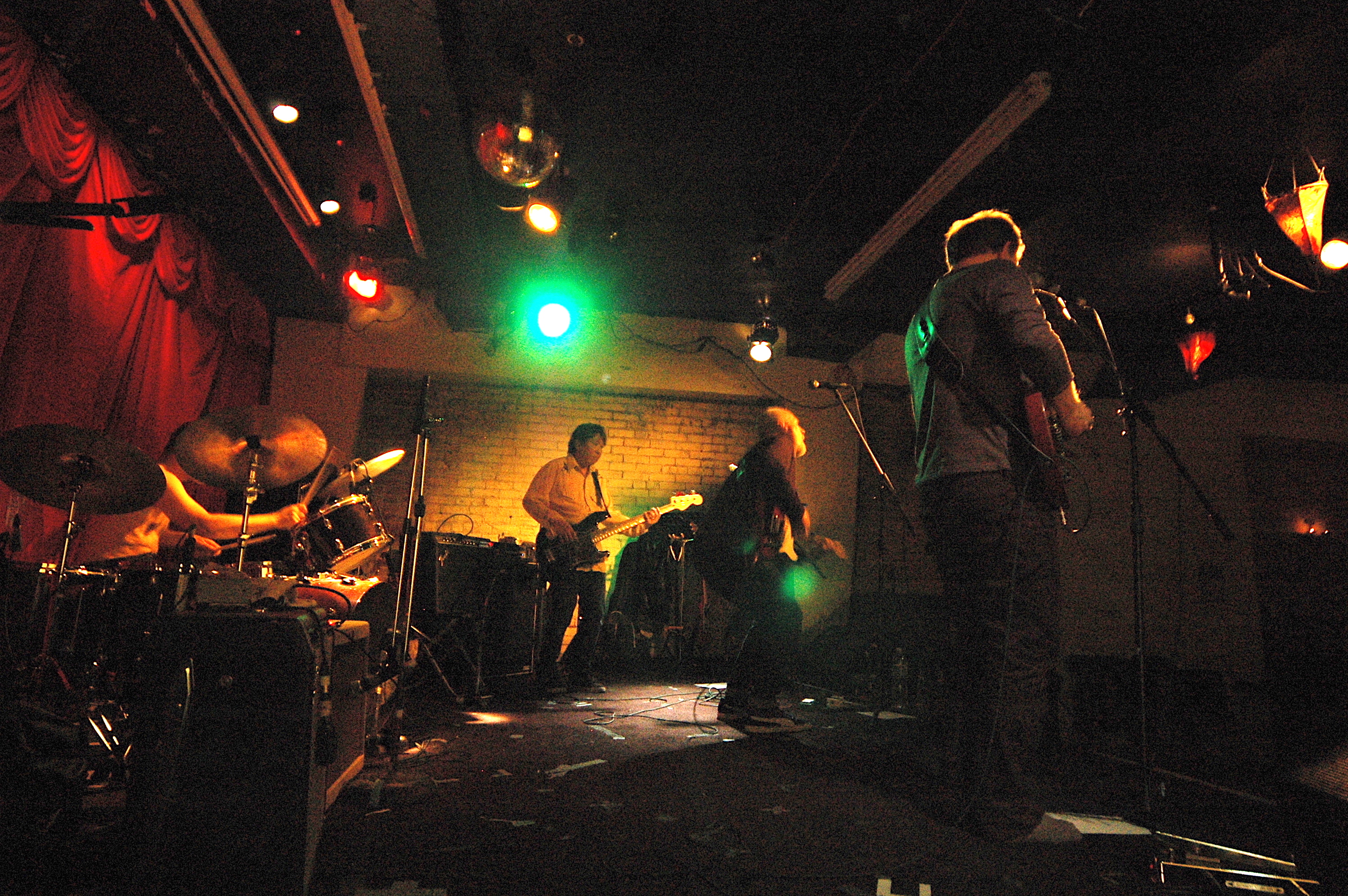
Scenics play the El Mocambo, Toronto. Photo by Mark Tearle.

Dissatisfied with the sound of 2009's Sunshine World CD, The Scenics remaster that material with British Columbia producer Joby Baker, who had mixed "Dead Man" and mastered "How Does It Feel". In 2016, the refurbished tracks are released as the In The Summer: Studio Recordings 1977/78 LP by Rave Out in Europe, and DreamTower, distributed by Light In The Attic, in North America.

The Scenics reconvene in Toronto in July 2016 to celebrate this release with dates in Canada and the US. However, their Visa is delayed and they are unable to play half a dozen shows in the US. Instead, they go into Toronto's Baldwin Sound and record seven songs. The shows are re-booked for the fall. The Scenics decide to go out as a trio, revisiting their first, more open ended sound, and tour Buffalo, Beacon New York, New York City, Jersey City New Jersey, Boston, Montreal, Detroit, Chicago, and Cleveland. Meyers then flies back to the west coast and does four solo shows in Seattle, Eugene, Ashland, and Portland.

In 2019, Meyers writes music included in the soundtrack for the documentary Dosed.

In March 2021, Meyers released Deeper Into the Forest, an album that sets poet/publisher Diana Hayes' performances to his music, with wordless vocals by Susheela Dawne.

In the spring of 2022, Meyers released Bones, an album of post rock ambient music he creates with Simon Millerd, pianist and trumpeter from Montreal.

In 2023, In The Summer is picked up for distribution by Supreme Echo Records in Canada and Revolver/Midheaven in the USA.

== Members ==
Andy Meyers (guitar, bass, vocals, sax, keyboards, songwriter)

Ken Badger (guitar, bass vocals, songwriter)

Mark Perkell (drums 1980–present)

=== Former members ===
Mike Young

Ken Fox

Brad Cooper

Mark French

Mike Cusheon

== Discography ==
=== Albums ===
Underneath the Door (LP 1980, Bomb/Rio Records)

How Does It Feel to Be Loved? The Scenics Play the Velvet Underground (CD 2008, Dream Tower Records)

Sunshine World - Studio Recordings 1977-78 (CD 2009, Dream Tower Records)

Dead Man Walks Down Bayview (LP/CD/Digital 2012, Dreamtower Records)

In The Summer- Studio Recordings 1977-78 (LP/CD/Digital 2016, Dream Tower Records and Rave Up Records)

=== Singles ===
Karen b/w See Me Smile (1981, Scenic Route Records)

=== Compilations ===
And Now Live from Toronto The Last Pogo (LP 1979, Bomb Records)

==== Albums by Andy Meyers ====
Talking Songs (Scattered Bodies, CD/Digital 2014, Dream Tower Records)

Deeper Into The Forest (Diana Hayes/Andy Meyers, CD/Digital 2021, Dream Tower Records)

Bones (Millerd Meyers, CD/Digital 2022, Dream Tower Records)

== See also ==
- Toronto punk rock
