= Steven Leckie =

Canadian singer (1957–2025)

Stephen Mitchell Leckie (19 September 1957 – 12 June 2025), known professionally as Steven Leckie, was a Canadian singer, songwriter and artist who was known as the frontman and founder of the Toronto punk rock band, The Viletones.

== Life and career ==
Born in Scarborough, Ontario, Leckie founded the Viletones in 1976 after attending a Ramones concert in Toronto. Performing under the provocative stage name "Nazi Dog," he attracted media attention through aggressive stage acts, including self-inflicted injuries during performances. Early shows, such as one at the Colonial Underground club in May 1977, drew controversy and criticism from the media.

In 1977, the Viletones released the single "Screaming Fist," considered among Canada's earliest punk recordings. Leckie also organized a showcase featuring Toronto punk bands at the CBGB club in New York City, an event dubbed the "Canadian invasion" that drew notice from critics like Lester Bangs. Leckie was also initially cast to play the lead role in the 1977 film adaptation of Stephen Zoller's rock musical Metal Messiah, but dropped out and the role was recast to star David Jensen of the band Kickback.

Due in part to internal tensions and Leckie's behaviour, the original Viletones lineup disbanded in 1978. Members who departed formed the band the Secrets, citing challenges of working with Leckie. He continued performing under the Viletones name with different musicians, releasing the EP Look Back in Anger in 1978, and participating in Toronto's notable Last Pogo concert. The band's first album, Saturday Night, Sunday Morning, a live recording, was released in 1983 after the initial wave of Canadian punk had diminished.

Leckie later opened a clothing boutique and gallery called Fleurs du Mal on Queen Street East in 1992. He periodically reunited versions of the Viletones for performances through 2016. His influence was recognized in various forms, including a reference in William Gibson's novel Neuromancer.

Leckie was married twice and had no children. He lived with multiple sclerosis and was diagnosed with lung cancer in 2023. Leckie died on 12 June 2025, at the age of 67.
