= Wyndham Wise =

Canadian film historian, critic, editor and publisher

Wyndham Paul Wise is a Canadian film historian, critic, editor and publisher. He was the founder and editor-in-chief of the film magazine Take One: Film & Television in Canada (1992–2006).

== Career ==
Born in London, England, Wyndham Wise was raised in Don Mills, a suburb of Toronto, where he performed on stage as a child with the Don Mills Players. He has a M.A. from the Graduate School of Drama, University of Toronto, and a Master of Fine Arts from the Graduate Programme in Film and Video, York University. He was the first film contributor to the monthly city listings in Toronto Life magazine (1972–74).

During the mid-1970s, Wise was part of the nascent Toronto underground theatre scene, producing Shop-Talk (Toronto Free Theatre, 1976), Spinning (Centre for Experimental Art and Communication and P.S. 1 Contemporary Art Center, New York City, 1977) and Con/Notes (Theatre Passe Muraille and CEAC, 1977) with Richard Shoichet. He was a camera operator and editor on several installations by Canadian artist Noel Harding, and he also produced and directed three 16-mm shorts: Garbage (1974), A Sound Film (1975) and Spinning (1976). Wise was a volunteer driver during the first Toronto Festival of Festivals (1976) and appeared in commercials, on television and in feature films, including a small part in the 1979 film The Black Stallion. In 1982, he co-produced the documentary Liona Boyd: First Lady of the Guitar for C Channel as well as Liona Boyd in Concert, which was broadcast on Global TV in 1983.

He founded and was the editor-in-chief of Take One: Film & Television in Canada, which was published from 1992–2006. The magazine introduced the term Toronto New Wave into the Canadian canon.

He taught film studies at Algoma University (1985 & 1988) and York University (1987–88), and media writing at Sheridan College (1989–93). He served as the last Toronto reporter for Cinema Canada magazine, launched Point of View magazine in 1990 for the Canadian Independent Film Caucus (now the Documentary Organization of Canada) and edited the final issue of Independent Eye (1991) for the Canadian Filmmakers Distribution Centre. In 1997, he was instrumental in founding the Toronto Film Critics Association and launched Canadian Screenwriter for the Writers Guild of Canada in 1998.

In 2001, Wise edited Take One's Essential Guide to Canadian Film, published by the University of Toronto Press, a concise history of Canadian cinema. In 2008, Wise was hired by the Canadian Society of Cinematographers to edit CSC News, which he turned into Canadian Cinematographer in 2009. That year, his historical survey "Up from the Underground: Filmmaking in Toronto from Winter Kept Us Warm to Shivers" appeared in Toronto on Film, published by the Wilfrid Laurier University Press.

He has lectured with the LIFE Institute at Ryerson University, is a former contributor and consultant to the Northernstars.ca website and Historica's Canadian Encyclopedia and is the author of over 400 articles, biographies, interviews and reviews. He sometimes wrote under the pseudonym Paul Townend.
