= The Dishes (band) =

Canadian punk rock band

The Dishes were a new wave band from the first era of punk rock in the late 1970s in Toronto, Canada.

== History ==
The Dishes were formed in 1975 with a lineup of Tony Malone (keyboards), Scott Davey (guitar), Murray Ball (vocals), Steven Davey (drums), Ken Farr (bass) and Michael LaCroix (saxophone); later joined by Glenn Schellenberg (keyboards) who replaced Tony in early 1977. Their sound was heavily influenced by art-rock bands and artists such as Roxy Music, David Bowie and Sparks, with a fondness for Bonzo-style comedy and the use of props during their live shows. Although they formed in Thornhill, Ontario while the members were attending Thornlea Secondary School, the band became known primary as a Toronto band.

They were one of the earliest bands of the new wave era in Toronto along with Rough Trade and both bands were notable in having openly gay members. Both bands played gigs at the Ontario College of Art (OCA) and The Dishes went on to play regular gigs at the Beverly Tavern. The Dishes presaged the Toronto punk scene by 2 years. They broke up just as the new scene was about to explode. Among their friends and admirers were future members of The Viletones, the B-Girls, and Martha and the Muffins; The Diodes played their 2nd gig opening for The Dishes at the OCA.

Their musical style had little in common with the loud and fast three chord punk of much of the era having more in common with art-punk bands of the era such as Talking Heads and early (John Foxx era) Ultravox, and the band would continue to do art gallery gigs including shows with the art collective General Idea and at fashion shows.

The band recorded an EP Fashion Plates in 1977, becoming the first Toronto band to record and release a self-created 45. In 1978 they released a second 45 "Hot Property". In 1977, The Dishes also filmed a televised concert for TV Ontario becoming the second Canadian New Wave band to appear on television after FM had previously done a TV Ontario show in 1976. Though thought of as an art-school band, none of the members had ever attended an art school. But their residency at The Beverley Tavern, a few blocks from OCA, meant a lot of art students would be checking them out. Their arty use of visual and graphic arts in aggressive street postering brought them a lot of attention. Later, collaborations with art collective General Idea (who designed their two record covers) and starting a fanzine as well as engaging in other photo-arts situations, established them as artists rather than just a band.

The band broke up in 1978 although they did reunite for a show at the Winnipeg Art Gallery in 1984. When Tony Malone left in 1977, he started Drastic Measures, a band that would achieve greater heights than The Dishes and even land a record deal with CBS and score a minor hit single.

After The Dishes disbanded, Steven Davey switched to vocals/guitar and started his own band, The Everglades. Both Drastic Measures and The Everglades contributed tracks to The Last Pogo LP although they do not appear in the film. Steven would later go on to become a journalist for the Toronto Star, MacLean's Magazine, Xtra and Now. He died suddenly and unexpectedly in 2014 of a heart attack. Tony kept playing solo, he died in 2023. Scott Davey joined a new band The Sharks with Sherry Kean and played with Rough Trade and then retired from music. Ken Farr joined Drastic Measures for a while, then went on to work for the Canadian government in its Silviculture dept. Murray Ball became a successful restaurant and club owner. Michael LaCroix became a professional sound recorder on big budget film sets.

Members of the band appear in the documentary The Last Pogo Jumps Again. A CD recording of their TV Ontario show plus a couple of other unreleased tracks was released in 2002.
