= The 'B' Girls =

Canadian punk rock band

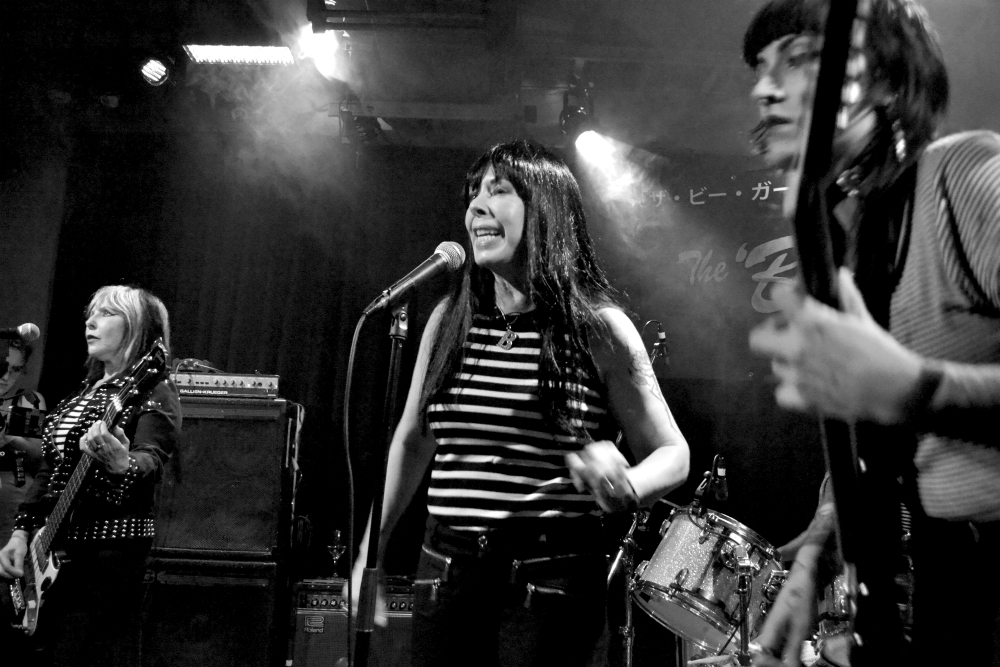
- The 'B' Girls in Japan, 2018

Background information
- Origin: Toronto, Canada
- Genre: Punk rock
- Years active: 1977–1982
- Labels: Bomp! Records, Other Peoples Music
- Past members: Lucasta Ross (nee Rochas); Renee Schilhab; Xenia Holiday; Cynthia Ross; Rhonda Ross; Marcy Saddy; Elisa Moldanado; Lyla Vander

The 'B' Girls were a Toronto punk rock band from the first wave of punk rock in the late 1970s and early 1980s. Where Toronto band The Curse was North America's first all-female punk band, the B-Girls were the second such band in Toronto.

== History ==
The 'B' Girls formed in 1977 after Cynthia and Lucasta met at the after-party of a Thin Lizzy concert. Both had been hanging out at the punk clubs and watching guys start bands, noting that most of them couldn't play. Lucasta was already a singer; Cynthia played piano; she translated that to the bass guitar. They recruited her sister Rhonda Ross as the drummer and Lucasta's friends Renee Schilhab and Xenia Holiday (nee Splawinsky) on guitar. At 20, Cynthia was the oldest band member. Rhonda would later be replaced by Marcy Saddy who had briefly played with the Demics. Cynthia and Rhonda are sisters and are not related to Lucasta.

The band chose the name after it was suggested by John Catto, guitarist for Diodes. 'B-Girls' were women who, in the post-World War Two era, got a take from bartenders after getting men to buy them drinks. Catto designed the band's logo and made the stencil for them; Cynthia painted all the T-shirts, the band made its own buttons and fliers, and only recorded the 'B' sides of covers because they were less expensive. They also set rules: no politics, no short skirts or shorts on stage, and no cleavage. Cynthia believes that their refusal to be sex objects was the reason they never secured a record deal.

Using gear borrowed from The Diodes, the four women began practicing in a basement in the Toronto suburb of Thornhill, working to hone a sound like The Ronettes or The Crystals. Their sound was closer to that of a 1960s Mersey Beat band than the usual loud, fast punk sound of the era. That was reflected in their dress, which included go-go boots, tight leggings and matching sweaters. They first perfected Nancy Sinatra's hit "These Boots Are Made for Walkin'", then added their own material. When they had six songs, they made their debut opening for The Viletones at Toronto's famed gay bar Club David's. They played the six songs twice, in a different order. No one minded. As Sam Sutherland noted in his 2012 book Perfect Youth: The Birth of Canadian Punk:

"Their lack of technical ability gave them a distinctly punk edge. Combined with Lucasta's trained professional singing voice, they were the perfect mix of punk ethos and pop ideal, a compelling mix that garnered the band a substantial fan base almost instantly."

The band soon became a fixture on the Toronto punk scene, playing clubs alongside Teenage Head, The Curse, The Poles, the Diodes and the Viletones. In September 1979, they toured with The Clash and The Undertones; they also opened for Iggy Pop and Blondie. The first time he heard the B-Girls, Toronto Star music critic Peter Goddard wrote that they were "too bad to set a bad example"; six months later, he called them "the most improved band in rock and roll".

In 1979 Greg Shaw, owner of Bomp! Records signed them to release the singles "Fun At The Beach" and "B-Side", which were produced by Bob Segarini. The singles were also released in the UK and Japan.

By 1980, The B-Girls were booked once a month at New York's CBGB. Cynthia had also become engaged to Dead Boys singer Stiv Bators. It was better than the band moved to New York. Lucasta and Rhonda declined. Xenia replaced Lucasta on vocals and Rhonda was replaced by former Demics drummer Marcy Saddy. The four women spent the first month sleeping on the floor of Sylvain Sylvain's apartment; they were soon getting steady gigs at CBGB and Max's Kansas City, often with Debbie Harry manning the sound system. They opened for Elvis Costello, The Heartbreakers, The Stranglers, Sham 69, Crowded House, The B-52's, The Romantics, Levi and the Rockats, Nikki & the Corvettes, Richard Hell, Lee Dorsey, The Cramps, Joey Ramone, Joan Jett, Johnny Thunders, and even Allen Ginsberg.

While their music was popular in Japan and the UK, they never toured out of the Toronto-New York area. They made one trip, to play the Whisky a Go Go in Los Angeles; while there, they sang (uncredited) back-up vocals on Blondie's hit song "The Tide Is High" and Bator's solo album, Disconnected. A video was shot for "High School Dance" (A.K.A. "Boys Are Drinking") and they created several demos, produced by Harry, Mick Jones, Craig Leon, and Liam Sternberg. I.R.S. Records and Phil Spector showed interest in signing them to a record deal, but that did not materialize. In 1982, the band returned to Toronto and broke up.

After the break-up, Lucasta formed a new band called Minutes From Downtown who had a hit with "Wrapped In Velvet". Marcy Saddy joined Certain General before becoming a full-time artist. Holiday became a yoga instructor. Schilhab married, became a reporter (as Renee Bullock), then a documentary filmmaker; she died of cancer in 2020. Cynthia Ross took time off to raise a family, then formed a band called New York Junk.

The 'B' Girls' collected recordings, remastered by Peter J. Moore, were released in 1997 as Who Says Girls Can't Rock. The members of the band appear in the 2013 documentary The Last Pogo Jumps Again.

In 2017, all of the B-Girls demos from 1977 to 1982 were released on the album Bad Not Evil. Cynthia and Lucasta re-formed the band, with The Trash Bags guitarist Elisa Moldanado and drummer Lyla Vander, from the band Roya. They played several gigs in the New York area but did not continue.

== Discography ==
- "Fun At The Beach" / "B Side" (1979, Singles) BOMP!
- Who Says Girls Can't Rock (1997), Other Peoples Music
- Bad Not Evil (2017), BOMP!

Compilation Inclusions

- Who Put The Bomp? (1979), Decca Records
- Stiv - No Compromise No Regrets (2019), MVD Audio
- Girls Go Power Pop! (2020), Big Beat Records
