= Metal Messiah =

- Directed by: Tibor Takács
- Written by: Stephen Zoller
- Produced by: Joseph L. Sutherland; Tibor Takács; Stephen Zoller
- Starring: David Jensen; John Paul Young; Richard Ward Allen
- Cinematography: Joseph L. Sutherland
- Edited by: Tibor Takács
- Music by: Tim Clement; Mychael Danna
- Production companies: Mega Media Productions; JLS Films
- Release date: 1977
- Running time: 76 minutes
- Country: Canada
- Language: English

Metal Messiah is a Canadian rock opera musical science fiction film, directed by Tibor Takács and released in 1977. An adaptation of Stephen Zoller's theatrical stage musical, the film centres on a space alien (David Jensen) who comes to earth to save humanity from destroying itself with the decadence of rock music, but must battle an evil concert promoter (John Paul Young) who wants to continue to profit from society's hedonism, and coopts the Messiah to perform as a rock star before attempting to destroy him.

Most of the film's cast were real Toronto-area rock musicians; Young was the lead singer of The Cardboard Brains, while Jensen was the lead singer of Kickback. Steven Leckie of The Viletones had been cast as the Messiah, but the role was recast to star Jensen.

The film was screened in 1977, before screening in 1978 at the Montreal International Festival of 16mm Cinema.

The film faced some criticism for being out of step with the youth culture of its time; the original play was based on the glam rock scene of the mid-1970s, although by the time of the film's release the leading edge of the live music scene had shifted toward punk rock.

Zoller received a Canadian Film Award nomination for Best Adapted Screenplay at the 28th Canadian Film Awards in 1977.
