= Centre for Experimental Art and Communication =

The Centre for Experimental Art and Communication (CEAC)
- Founded at: 15 Duncan St
- Location: Toronto, Canada
- Fields: Arts and Culture
- Co-Founder: Amerigo Marras
- Co-Founder: Suber Donald Corley
- Years active: 1976 to 1978
- Parent organization: Kensington Art Association

The Centre for Experimental Art and Communication (CEAC) was a Canadian artist-run centre that developed out of the Kensington Arts Association (KAA) [1973-1978] in 1976 as a multimedia space that provided an important venue for experimental and avant-garde art in Toronto, Ontario and beyond. CEAC was the first ever multi-media centre owned and operated by an artist-run centre in Toronto and the largest non-institutional art space during its time. The centre engaged with artists, musicians, and activists from across North America through organized exhibitions, in addition to hosting video production facilities, workshops, screening, and performance series'. CEAC encouraged artist-to-artist communication and provided a platform for Canadian artists to expand their knowledge through international tours. The centre was also home to the radical art magazine Art Communication Edition, later renamed STRIKE. Despite its success as an artist-run centre from 1976 through to 1978, CEAC was disbanded in the summer of 1978 following scandal and the withdrawal of government funding from the Ontario Arts Council

During its years of operation, CEAC was invested in the radical juxtaposition of materialist practices and communication through art. A recurring theme throughout its programming included the synthesis of language and/as art, and technology. CEAC's multimedia approach to art bridged across many platforms, and included art exhibitions, international tours, workshops, conferences, film and video screenings, art performances, and music events. The centre housed a library and archives, a video production studio, a performance space, a film theatre, and a punk-music venue.

A chief concern of CEAC was the critique of social norms and formalism and the commodification of art, a characteristic of similar art groups formed during the apex of conceptual art throughout the 1960s and 1970s. Amerigo Marras, CEAC's co-founder (alongside Suber Donald Corley) and chief theoretician, promoted "contextual art" as a process that deconstructs meanings that no longer correspond to reality and allows the audience to introduce new meanings. The group celebrated the exhibition of avant-garde and non-material art practices (performance art, happening, body art, experimental film, et cetera), and was dedicated to “a continuous collective experiment in living and in sociological infiltrations with practical demonstrations.”

== Locations ==
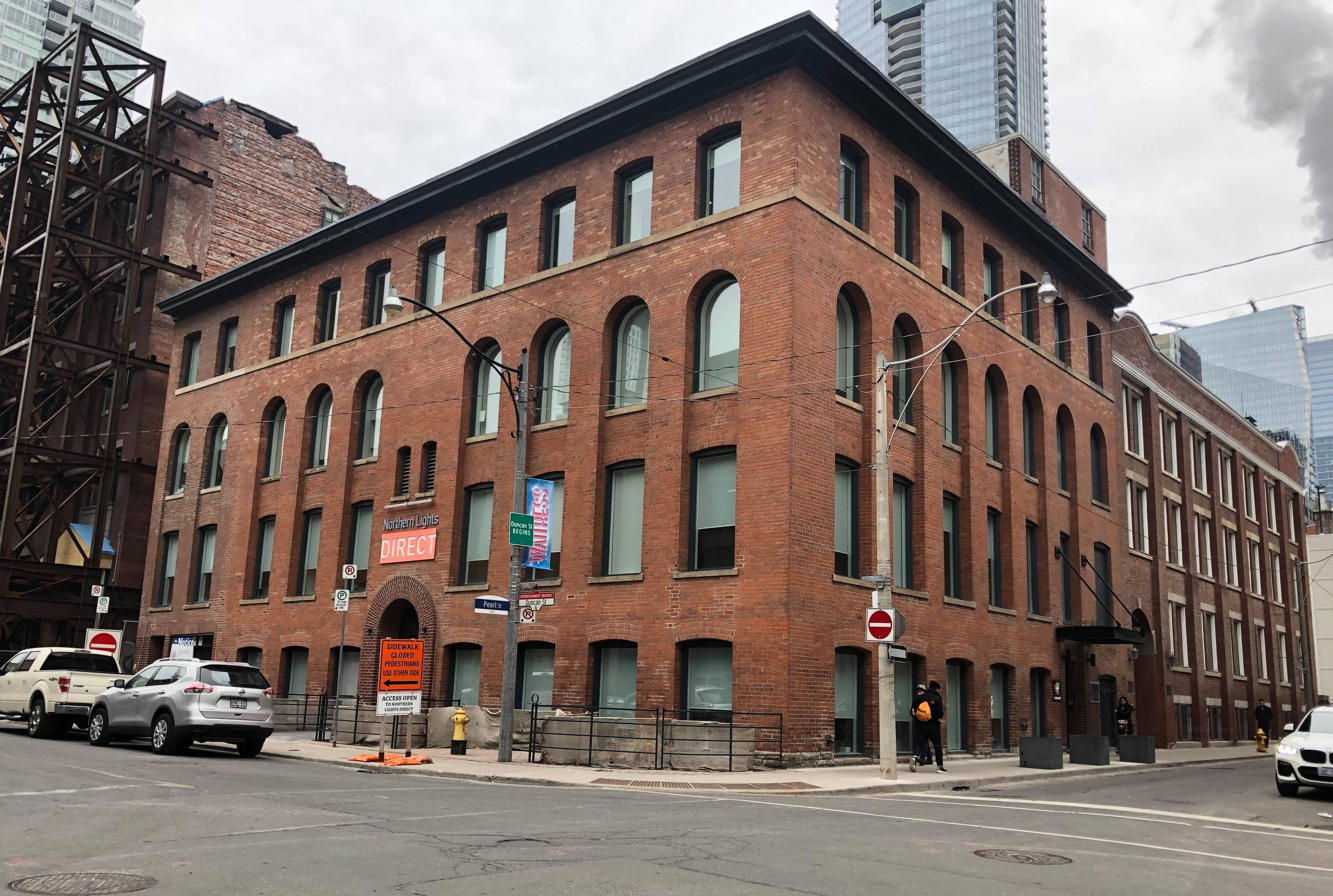
Photograph of present-day 15 Duncan Street, Toronto, Ontario.

Before the formation of CEAC, their members and their peers co-worked in shared spaces. CEAC's founders Amerigo Marras and Suber Donald Corley purchased a house at 4 Kensington Avenue in the Market area, allowing early incarnations of The Body Politic and Glad Day Bookshop to use a shed behind the house as an alternative space. In the early 1970s, Jearld Moldenhauer moved into Marras and Corley's apartment at 65 Kendal Avenue – this address served as the official home for Glad Day Books and The Body Politic.

Previous to the formation of CEAC, Marras and Corley were affiliated with the Kensington Art Association (KAA). Following a $55,000 Wintario grant, KAA became the first artist-run organization in Toronto to buy a building and effectively establish a large multimedia centre. After acquiring 15 Duncan Street in September 1976, KAA launched CEAC. The centre's large, four-storey building in the light-manufacturing in the area south west of Queen Street and University Avenue, now known as the Entertainment District, where it became an instrumental hub for Toronto's creative cultural scene.

=== Funnel Experimental Film Theatre ===
The Funnel Experimental Film Theatre (1977-1989) was an experimental cinema collective that gathered in the basement of CEAC's 15 Duncan Street location. The collective was born out a concept of "hybrid telemedia", whereby independent video production would intersect with television's mass communication systems; emphasizing broadcast quality and colour technology.

Founding the Canadian Super 8 Distribution Centre in 1976, CEAC organized regular screenings and Super 8 Open Screenings which provided a focus for local filmmakers. These screenings led to the creation of a video production studio in the basement of CEAC and the formation of The Funnel Experimental Film Theatre in September 1977, co-founded, amongst others, by filmmaker Ross McLaren, who was then teaching filmmaking at OCAD University.

The Funnel's video program included Noel Harding, David Clarkson, Elizabeth MacKenzie, Susan Britton, Peter Dudar, John Massey, Ian Murray, and members of the Development Education Centre and Trinity Square Video.

Filmmakers exhibiting at CEAC showcased during this period included: Vera Frenkel in the "Language Art" series of 1975; Darryl Tonkin's film Cantilever Tales (1975) in the "Body Art" series; Michael Snow, Rick Hancox, Vito Acconci, and David Rimmer in the "Art Film" series of 1977; Holly Dale, Janis Cole, and Al Razutis; and Ross McLaren with the documentary film Crash 'N' Burn (1977). Other associated artists included Jim Anderson, Robert Belton, Raphael Bendahan, Peter Dudar, Eldon Garnet, Chris Gallagher, Ron Gillespie, Rick Hancox, Noel Harding, Keith Locke, Robert Morphy, and David Rimmer.

Following CEAC's closure in 1978, The Funnel moved to 507 King Street East where about 30 members built a state-of-the-art 100-seat theatre, recording/projecting studio, darkroom, library and office. Suffering a political split in 1986, the group finally dissolved in 1989

=== Centre for Experimental Art and Language (CEAC) School ===
In early 1978, the centre established the CEAC school which held several workshops and seminars, including:

- "Basic Film Making" held by Ross McLaren, covering films, cameras, lenses, lighting, exposure, sound, editing, production and distribution.
- "Movement Workshop" held by Lily Eng, examined methods of movement and choreography, exercises and spatial explorations.
- "Words" held by John Faichney, aimed at making one's vocabulary a tool for expression.
- "Thought and Thinking"
- "Video Cassette Editing"
- "Art and Revolution"
- "Colour Theory and Practice'

== Publications ==
KAA/CEAC published 9 magazine issues under the name Art Communication Edition (A.C.E) between the years 1976-1977 and 3 issues as STRIKE in 1978. The publication Art Communication Edition was reinvented as STRIKE due to a desire to "merge with the social stance with consumerist tactics, the antithetical position".

The magazine dealt with contemporary art in Toronto and abroad. It was distributed monthly in Canada, the United States, throughout Europe, South America and Australia. The material published included activities of the CEAC, features on film and performances, books, and statements on recent research and developments in the arts.

== Controversy ==
The contents of the second issue of CEAC's magazine, STRIKE, and its radical political program caused major controversy that led to the withdrawal of funding from the Ontario Arts Council and the Canada Council. The May 1978 issue of STRIKE, in support of the Italian militarist group, The Red Brigades, and Red Brigade-style “art-world” kneecapping, was charged with promoting violent overthrow of authority. The controversial issue included an excerpt from a 1937 work by Mao Tse-tung: “To still maintain tolerance towards the servants of the State is to preserve the status quo of Liberalism. In the Manner of the [Red] Brigades, we support leg shooting/knee capping in order to accelerate the demise of the old system”. Scandal broke quickly after the editorial was published, with a headline on the front page of Toronto Sun on May 5, 1978, reading: “Ont. Grant Supports Red Brigades Ideology: Our Taxes Aid Blood Thirsty Radical Paper”.

Following nearly immediate loss of funding in June and July 1978 following the controversial May article, CEAC was forced to close its doors, unable to meet mortgage payments on the 15 Duncan Street location. Competitive animosities and lack of support between CEAC and other Torontonian artist-run centres, notably A Space Gallery, also became clear in the aftermath following the STRIKE scandal and CEAC's demise.

A 1978 letter to CEAC from the Video Officer for the Canada Council, Renee Bart, stated:

"[The] Council has received numerous written and verbal complaints about the lack of access to the CEAC facility, an alleged censorship of projects in the selection process, the disdainful manner in which many artists either using or requesting the use of the facilities were treated [...] This is a very clear indication of a lack of support for, or confidence in the CEAC from the very community which it was funded to serve, and gives rise to questions about CEAC's use of public funds.".

CEAC's subsequent and final third issue of STRIKE stated, in response to the scandal: “what we wish to make clear is that what happened to STRIKE and CEAC is a definite case of censorship, in fact, political repression [...] our project was conceived of as a social experiment, designed to expose the illusions of freedom within the arts and the greater context of liberal democracies”; "As the Futurists were in fascist Italy; as the Bauhaus was in Nazi Germany; as the Constructivists were in the Soviet Union, the CEAC was banned in Canada.” CEAC's founders Amerigo Marras and Suber Corley relocated to New York City following the controversy in 1978

== Influence ==
CEAC has been credited with influencing the development of the Toronto art scene and the art hub at Queen and Spadina by many art historians. Of the many existing art institutions that moved to the area during the mid-1970s, including the Music Gallery, Art Metropole, A Space Gallery, and others, as well as new spaces which opened up, YYZ, Mercer Union, and the Cabana Room, CEAC was the largest and most avant-garde. CEAC has also been credited with sponsoring the first punk venue in Canada, Crash ’N’ Burn and with developing the early punk-rock scene in Toronto.

=== Crash 'n' Burn ===
In the spring of 1977, the Toronto underground scene saw an explosion of local bands adopting the style and counterculture ethos of the New York and British punk movements. Perceiving the phenomenon as a spontaneous behavioural reaction against mainstream media, CEAC sponsored the first punk venue in Canada, Crash 'n' Burn. Organized by The Diodes, a band composed of OCA students, Crash 'n' Burn was located in the basement of CEAC from May through August 1977. The original members of The Diodes Paul Robinson, John Catto, David Clarkson, John Hamilton, and Ian MacKay—collaborated with Amerigo Marras and Bruce Eves in the production of a 45 rpm disc entitled "Raw/War", which was distributed as the 8th issue of Art Communication Edition. The music on the record was scattered among droning statements by Marras and Eves from the Behavioural Manifestos of CEAC and Reindeer Werk (performance-duo of Tom Puckey & Dirk Larsen). Heralded by Marras as the instrument to produce the “great awakening in the brain-washed television public”, Raw/War blended highly sophisticated rhetoric with the raw sound of hardcore punk. Other bands that played Crash 'n' Burn, included The Curse and The B Girls; The Poles; The Viletones; The Dishes; and The Dead Boys.

In 1977, Ross McLaren made the experimental film called "Crash 'n' Burn" shot in and named after the club. The film, shot on 16mm black-and-white stock, features punk rock performances by the Dead Boys, Teenage Head, The Boyfriends, and the Diodes. Village Voice critic Ed Halter called the film a "self-destructive document of Toronto's eponymous punk club."

The short-lived energy of the venue ended in September 1977, when CEAC closed Crash 'n' Burn forever. Later in 1977, the basement of CEAC was transformed into The Funnel Experimental Film Theatre's headquarters.

== Tours and exhibitions ==
CEAC's first exhibition, presented in January 1976, was entitled Body Art. The exhibition investigated the body's architecture, transmutation, and social behaviour. Featured artists included Suzy Lake, Darryl Tonkin, Lily Eng and Peter Dudar, amongst others. The exhibition was influenced in part by the Vienna School and Hermann Nitsch. It established a platform for performance and non-objective art, which countered present strategies of appropriation and parody then promoted by the art-collective General Idea, also operating in Toronto during that time.

Bound, Bent and Determined, a performance series organized by Bruce Eves, elaborated on the theme of sado-masochism taken up by Body Art.. Featured artists included: Wendy Knox-Leet, Ron Gillespie, Heather MacDonald, Darryl Tonkin, Blast-Bloom, Bruce Eves, Andy Fabo and Paul Dempsey

CEAC began to promote art in New York and on the European continent in 1976. CEAC highlighted the work of the Missing Associates, Ron Gillespie, and made their initial connections with the Polish contextual artists, the “action” school of performance, and Reindeer Werk.

CEAC's second European tour was in May 1977. Taking part in discussions held in Paris by the Sociological Art Collective and in Poland by the contextual art movement, the CEAC group also presented collaborative performances in various art venues, asserting the importance of performance as a means to break down audience/performer barriers. In one seminar/performance, Bruce Eves, Amerigo Marras, Diane Boadway, and Suber Corley placed themselves in the four corners of a gallery, taking turns reading from a text, and speaking in turns into a microphone for fifteen seconds at a time. The text consisted of “seventy statements proposing an antithetical stance to dominant ideology rather than alternative positions that could be reappropriated by the cultural hegemony”.

Throughout its few years of operation, CEAC collaborated and exhibited with a multitude of artists, such as Sarah Charlesworth, Joseph Kosuth, Anthony McCall, Dennis Oppenheim, Martha Rosler, Carolee Schneeman, and Lawrence Weiner, and had organized concerts by Philip Glass and Steve Reich.
