= The Last Pogo =

- Directed by: Colin Brunton; Patrick Lee
- Produced by: Colin Brunton
- Edited by: Patrick Lee
- Release date: 1978
- Country: Canada
- Language: English

The Last Pogo is a short film made by Colin Brunton in 1978.

Shot in Toronto, at the Horseshoe Tavern, The Last Pogo concert on December 1 was billed as "the last punk rock concert" in Toronto—at least for that original wave of punkers circa 1977/1978. Named as ironic tribute to "The Last Waltz", the concert film of the final concert by The Band directed by Martin Scorsese. Featuring performances by The Scenics, The Cardboard Brains, The Secrets, The Mods, The Ugly, The Viletones and Teenage Head, the event also spawned a live recording called And Now Live From Toronto -- The Last Pogo.

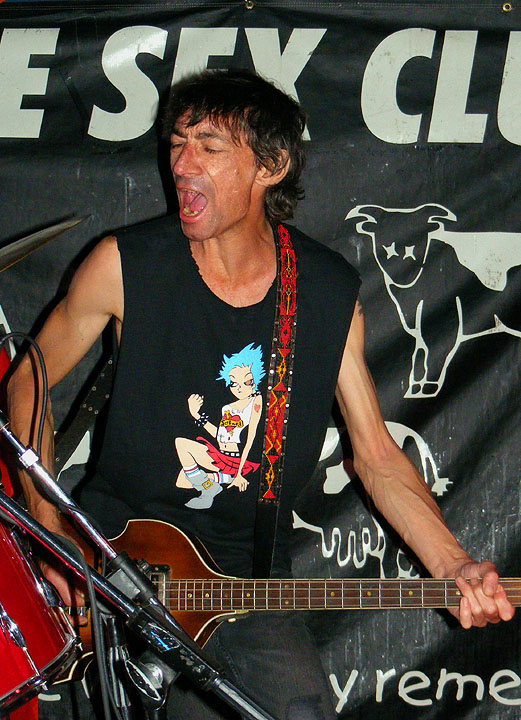
The UGLY-(band), Sam Ferrara on Bass

Apart from the performances, the highlight of the film was probably the shots of the aftermath, because during the show, a bit of a riot occurred. Brunton's crew was ushered outside by police and firefighters, but the sound recordist stuck it out.

The film itself was available only in bootleg copies and occasional airings until its release on DVD in 2008. The DVD was released as a tribute to Teenage Head frontman Frankie Venom.

== Cast ==
- Teenage Head as Themselves
- The Viletones as Themselves
- The Ugly as Themselves
- The Mods as Themselves
- The Secrets as Themselves
- The Cardboard Brains as Themselves
- The Scenics as Themselves
- Margaret Barnes-DelColle as herself
- Gary Courmier as himself
- Mickey DeSadist (of the Forgotten Rebels) as himself
- Gary Topp as himself
- Members of The Curse as Themselves

== Soundtrack ==
The soundtrack album was entitled "And Now Live From Toronto -- The Last Pogo" on Bomb Records and contained some performances that were not included in the film.

Track listing;

1. The Secrets - Teenage Rampage

2. Drastic Measures - Flowers

3. Cardboard Brains - Babies Run My World

4. The Scenics - In The Summer

5. The Scenics - Sunshine World

6. The Mods - Between Four Walls

7. The Everglades - Rock & Roll Cliche

8. The Secrets - Shout (Isley Brothers cover)

9. The Ugly - All Because Of You

10. Ishan Band - Egzebier (Peter Tosh cover)

11. Cardboard Brains - Jungles

12. Drastic Measures - Mr. America

13. The Everglades - I'm In A Coma

14. The Mods - Step Out Tonight

== Second film ==
In 2013 Brunton released The Last Pogo Jumps Again, which was a full-length documentary (200 minutes) about the first wave of punk in Toronto, Hamilton and London, Ontario in the late 1970s and early 1980s. The film, co-directed by Brunton and Kire Paputts, contained footage from the original film along with other archival footage of the era as well as contemporary interview footage. Besides the above-mentioned bands the film included footage and interviews with B-Girls, Nash the Slash, Johnny and the G-Rays, The Sidhes, Bob Segarini, Cleave Anderson (of Blue Rodeo), Martha and the Muffins, Rough Trade, The Diodes, The Demics and Simply Saucer among others.
