= The Secrets (disambiguation) =

The Secrets were an American girl group. It may also refer to:

- The Secrets (TV series)
- The Secrets (film)
- The Secrets (Canadian band)

== See also ==
- Secret (disambiguation)
- Secrets
