= CEAC =

CEAC may be an abbreviation for:

- European Civil Aviation Conference (French: Conférence Européenne de l'Aviation Civile)
- Controlled Environment Agriculture Center at the University of Arizona
- Central European Aluminum Company
- Compagnie Européenne d'Accumulateurs, former French battery seller, see Exide
- Centre for Experimental Art and Communication, a Canadian artist-run centre
