= Ross McLaren =

Ross McLaren may refer to:

- Ross McLaren (filmmaker) (1953–2023), Canadian filmmaker
- Ross McLaren (actor) (born 1991), English actor

== See also ==
- Ross MacLaren, Scottish footballer and coach
