= Horseshoe Tavern =

Concert venue in Toronto, Ontario, Canada

- The Horseshoe or The 'Shoe'
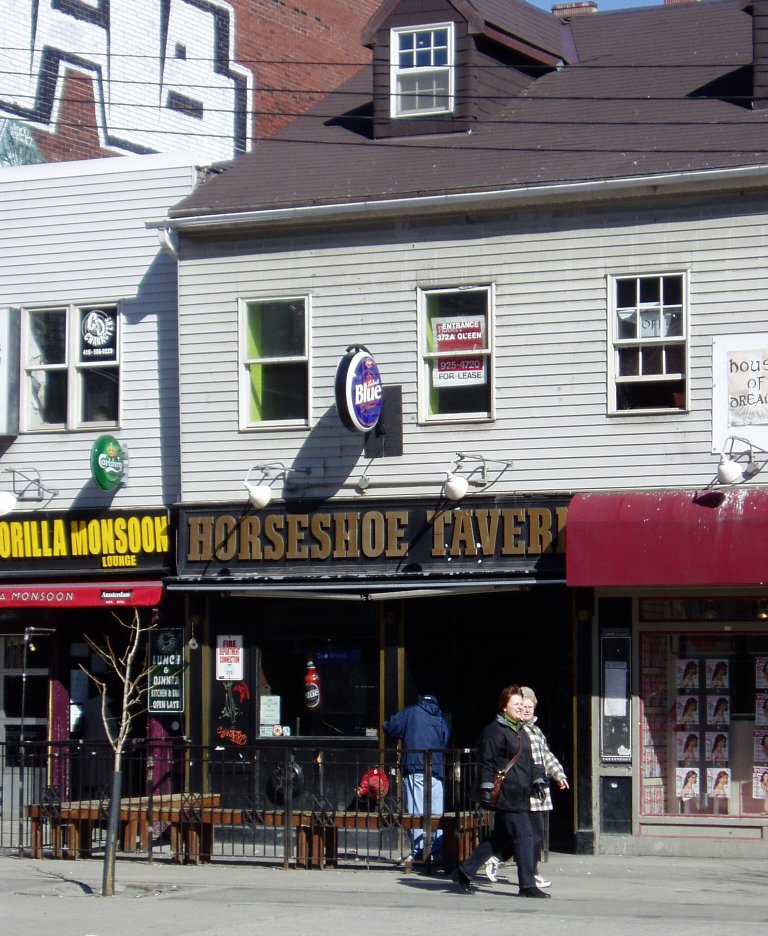
- The Horseshoe Tavern
- Interactive map of Horseshoe Tavern
- Former names: Country Roots n' Rockabilly Music Tavern
- Location: Toronto, Ontario, Canada
- Coordinates: 43.649081°N 79.395889°W
- Owner: Collective Concerts (Jeff Cohen)
- Capacity: 400
- Type: Nightclub
- Event: Indie

Construction
- Opened: 1947

Website
- horseshoetavern.com

The Horseshoe Tavern (known as The Horseshoe, The 'Shoe', The 'Toronto Tavern' and The 'Triple T' to Toronto locals) is a concert venue at 370 Queen Street West (northeast corner of Queen at Spadina) in downtown Toronto, Ontario, Canada, and has been in operation since 1947. Owned by "JC", Ken Sprackman, Craig Laskey, Naomi Montpetit, and the late Michael "X-Ray" MacRae, the venue is a significant part of Canadian musical lore. It is captured in the memories of thousands of concertgoers, and in books such as Have Not Been the Same.

== History ==
The building, erected in 1861, previously housed a blacksmith. Originally an 87-seat saloon, it was advertised in recent decades as a "Country Roots n' Rockabilly Music Tavern". The Horseshoe Tavern welcomed blues and folk artists in the 1960s; reggae, mod, punk and new wave acts in the 1970s and 1980s; and then alternative rock and everything from ska, surf and swing to Celtic music and alternative country from the 1990s onward.

The Horseshoe has supported up and coming Canadian artists through programs such as Dave Bookman's Nu Music Nite, a regular Tuesday showcase. Bookman was a Toronto radio DJ for Indie 88.

The Horseshoe Tavern celebrated its 60th anniversary in 2007 with six shows by Joel Plaskett. Plaskett played his entire catalogue over six consecutive nights, devoting each show to one full album. Special guests appearing at the concerts included Peter Elkas, Sarah Harmer and Gord Downie.

In 2023, several musicians withdrew their performances from the Horseshoe in response to the venue's cancellation of a pro-Palestine fundraiser and contentious emails from co-owner Jeff Cohen.

== Artists who have played at Horseshoe Tavern ==
=== International artists ===
- Billy Bragg
- Bon Iver
- Bright Eyes
- Cage the Elephant
- Cat Power
- Cecil Taylor
- The Charlatans
- The Cramps
- Crowded House
- Dandy Warhols
- Dead Boys
- Deerhunter
- Deer Tick
- Dick Dale
- Drive-by Truckers
- Elliott Smith
- Etta James
- Everclear
- Explosions in the Sky
- Father John Misty
- Foo Fighters
- Fountains of Wayne
- Frank Black
- Franz Ferdinand (band)
- Guided by Voices
- The Heartbreakers
- The Hold Steady
- Jason Isbell
- The Jayhawks
- Jesus Jones
- The Jesus Lizard
- Keith Urban
- Link Wray
- Linkin Park
- Live
- Los Lobos
- Manic Street Preachers
- Mission of Burma
- Mogwai
- Mudhoney
- My Chemical Romance
- My Morning Jacket
- The National
- Neko Case
- Neutral Milk Hotel
- Pedro the Lion
- Pixies
- The Police
- Ramones
- The Rolling Stones
- Talking Heads
- Sneaker Pimps
- The Soft Boys
- Soul Coughing
- Spin Doctors
- Spoon
- The Shins
- The Stranglers
- The Strokes
- Sufjan Stevens
- Sugar Ray
- Suicide
- Sun Ra
- Super Furry Animals
- Tame Impala
- Teenage Fanclub
- Throwing Muses
- Tripping Daisy
- The Troggs
- TV on the Radio
- Urge Overkill
- Vampire Weekend
- Veruca Salt
- Warren Zevon
- The War on Drugs
- The Wedding Present
- Wilco
- The Wonder Stuff
- Young the Giant
- The Bacon Brothers
- Radiohead

=== Canadian artists ===
- 13 Engines
- 54-40
- Arcade Fire
- Arkells
- Art Bergmann
- The Band
- Barenaked Ladies
- Big Sugar
- Big Wreck
- Billy Talent
- Blue Rodeo
- Brett Kissel
- Bryan Adams
- Change of Heart
- Constantines
- Death From Above 1979
- Do Make Say Think
- Fucked Up
- Great Big Sea
- Headstones
- Helix
- Images in Vogue
- Ian and Sylvia
- Jane Siberry
- Junkhouse
- The Jeff Healey Band
- Maestro Fresh Wes
- Mary Margaret O'Hara
- Nash the Slash
- Nickelback
- Our Lady Peace
- Prairie Oyster
- The Pukka Orchestra
- PUP
- Rheostatics
- Rough Trade
- Shania Twain
- Sloan
- Spirit of the West
- Spoons
- Stompin' Tom Connors
- Teenage Head
- Three Days Grace
- The Tea Party
- The Tragically Hip
- The Viletones
- The Watchmen
- The Weakerthans
- Wide Mouth Mason

== Media appearances ==
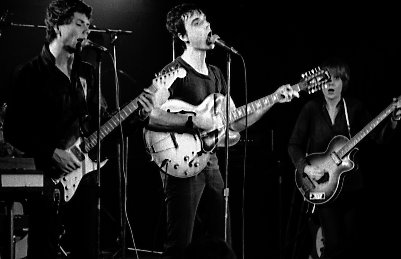
Talking Heads performing at The Horseshoe in 1978

Two Stompin' Tom Connors concert films, This Is Stompin' Tom (1972) and Across This Land with Stompin' Tom (1973) were shot at the Horseshoe, along with his 1971 album Live At The Horseshoe. The Live album includes an original tribute to the venue written by Connors, the "Horseshoe Hotel Song". In 1978, the tavern was the setting for Colin Brunton's punk rock documentary The Last Pogo, featuring the Scenics, the Cardboard Brains, The Secrets, the Mods, the Ugly, the Viletones, and Teenage Head. An archival photo montage of the Horseshoe Tavern's history was also featured in Brunton's 2013 feature film, The Last Pogo Jumps Again.

The Horseshoe was featured on Live on MTV in September 1997, when the Rolling Stones began their Bridges To Babylon Tour there with a 75-minute show. In 1998, the club's checkerboard floors were referenced in the Tragically Hip song "Bobcaygeon". In 2000, it hosted the Humble & Fred "Gift of Christmas" broadcast. In 2006, a live recording of "Red Flag" by Billy Talent from a performance at the tavern was released on the "Red Flag" CD single. In 2020, Kathleen Edwards referenced the Horseshoe in her song "Glenfern".

== Live releases ==
- 1971 - Stompin' Tom Connors: Live At The Horseshoe
- 1979 - Various Artists: And Now Live From Toronto... The Last Pogo (also a concert film)
- 1994 - Various Artists: Kumbaya Album Nineteen Ninety Four (Junkhouse track "Praying For The Rain")
- 1994 - Pat Temple And The High Lonesome Players: Cold Cuts
- 1995 - The Mods: Twenty 2 Months (4 tracks)
- 1998 - Edgefest 98 Rarities & Collectables (Watchmen track "Say Something")
- 1998 - Watchmen: Live Radar
- 2000 - Skydiggers: There And Back (12 tracks, recorded 1998)
- 2000 - Wilco: Why Would You Wanna Live (track "Passenger Side", recorded in 1997)
- 2001 - Melanie Doane: Melvin Live
- 2003 - Chris Bottomley's Brainfudge: Full Frontal Lobottomley Live 1990-1998 (7 tracks, recorded 1994)
- 2003 - The Mahones: Live At The Horseshoe
- 2004 - Tobin Sprout: Live At The Horseshoe Tavern
- 2004 - Pedro The Lion: Stations (3 tracks
- 2004 - Rheostatics: Calling Out The Chords - Vol. 1
- 2004 - Various Artists: It's A Team Mint Xmas Vol. 2
- 2006 - Hot Chip: Live At The Horseshoe, Toronto (recorded live 2005)
- 2006 - Loudness – Loudness In America 06 (concert film)
- 2006 - The Parkas: A Life Of Crime documentary / The Scars To Prove It E.P. (track "My Life Of Crime", recorded 2005)
- 2006 - Wolf Eyes: Live At Horseshoe Tavern, Toronto
- 2006 - Wolf Eyes / John Wiese: Live Frying: Toronto
- 2008 - Sun Ra: Live At The Horseshoe Tavern, Toronto 1978
- 2010 - The Master Plan: Maximum Respect (track "Picketts Charge")
- 2013 - Skydiggers: All Of Our Dreaming - Live 1988, 2000 & 2012 (10 tracks, recorded 1999)
- 2014 - The Tragically Hip: Fully Completely (2014 reissue bonus live disc, recorded 1992)
- 2015 - Neko Case: Fox Confessor Brings The Flood (track "John Saw That Number")
- 2015 - Teenage Jesus and the Jerks: Live 1977-1979 (three tracks, recorded 1978)
- 2016 - The Jeff Healey Band – Live At The Horseshoe Tavern 1993
- 2019 - The Unintended: The Unintended (2019 Reissue, Deluxe Version, three tracks recorded 2004)
- 2019 - The Hold Steady: Live In Toronto 9–14–18
- 2019 - The Hold Steady: Live In Toronto 9–15–18
- 2021 - The Lowest of the Low: Palaces and Taverns
- 2022 - The Hold Steady: Live In Toronto 5-4-22
