= Documentary Organization of Canada =

Canadian documentary filmmakers nonprofit

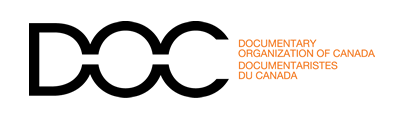
- Abbreviation: DOC
- Formation: 1983
- Type: Professional society
- Purpose: DOC advocates for documentary filmmakers nationwide on issues that affect the industry, and offers professional development workshops and networking opportunities
- Headquarters: Toronto with seven chapters across the country
- Region served: Canada
- Members: 1500+
- Official language: English, French
- Executive Director: Julian Carrington
- Affiliations: Chapter organizations Northwest, Alberta, Manitoba, Ontario, Quebec, Atlantic
- Website: Documentary Organization of Canada

The Documentary Organization of Canada (DOC) is a non-profit organization representing the interests of independent documentary filmmakers in Canada. It was founded as the Canadian Independent Film Caucus (CIFC) in the 1980s.

DOC advocates for documentary filmmakers nationwide on issues that affect the industry, and offers professional development workshops and networking opportunities. DOC was a founder of the Hot Docs Canadian International Documentary Festival in 1995,[2] and of the national magazine Point of View (POV).

== History ==
The Documentary Organization of Canada (DOC) is the collective voice of Canada’s independent documentary creators. DOC began in 1983 as the Canadian Independent Film Caucus (CIFC) to represent the interests of Canada’s growing community of indi-doc filmmakers.

In 2008, DOC celebrated its 25th anniversary. It was founded in 1982 by a dozen independent filmmakers who were invited and brought together by Cinema Canada magazine to a round table discussion of the film production scene. The following year, in 1983, a different group of filmmakers began meeting on their own in Toronto. These documentarians got together to discuss collective benefits (such as a dental plan), but it was a vital need for political representation and advocacy that inspired the group to create an organization of independent documentary filmmakers. They founded what would later be called the Canadian Independent Film Caucus (CIFC), which was subsequently incorporated as the Documentary Organization of Canada (DOC) in 2003.

DOC Chapters

DOC represents documentary filmmakers through its six chapters from coast-to-coast. The chapters are: DOC BC + Yukon + NWT, DOC Alberta, DOC Manitoba, DOC Ontario, DOC Quebec, and DOC Atlantic.

== Vision ==
Documentary is widely recognized as an essential part of Canada’s social fabric, fostering understanding and activating democratic discourse and social action.

Documentary production is rooted in a culture that values creative exploration, diversity of voice and expression, and deeply ethical practices anchored in respect, reciprocity and collaboration.

Canada’s history of documentary storytelling is known and celebrated by society while new generations of creators are supported to constantly reimagine the genre.

== Mission ==
The Documentary Organization of Canada (DOC) is the collective voice of Canada’s independent documentary creators. Its mission is to:

1. Promotes Canadian documentary creators, documentary culture and the documentary community.
2. Champions the creative, social and cultural contributions of documentary, including its role in fostering civic engagement and a democratic society.
3. Advances the rights of documentary creators from historically marginalized, underrepresented and misrepresented groups in Canada to hold agency in storytelling and production.
4. Advocates for a thriving ecosystem for the production and distribution of documentaries across all platforms.
5. Advocates for equitable access to resources, fair compensation and safer spaces for all documentary creators.
6. Promotes a culture of documentary making based on honest creative exploration, inventiveness, respect, reciprocity, and responsible and ethical documentary practices.
7. Connects and supports diverse documentary creators across Canada.
8. Fosters connections with documentarians and stakeholder organizations internationally.

== Organizational Values ==
These values continually guide and inspire DOC in all areas of internal and external activities, operations, programs and advocacy:

1. Respect
2. Inclusivity
3. Equity
4. Transparency
5. Responsibility
6. Reciprocity
7. Cultural Pluralism
8. Representation
9. Collaboration
10. Humility
11. Service
12. Active
13. Openness

== Advocacy ==
DOC actively advocates on behalf of documentary filmmakers to obtain representation in forums where decisions are made about the production and distribution of documentary films and videos. Specifically, DOC seeks to strengthen institutions, funders, broadcasters, distributors, co-ops, and exhibitors which contribute to the production of independent film and video in Canada. DOC also attempts to eliminate conflicts between different sources of funding for documentary film.

DOC’s advocacy mandate is established by the Executive Director and DOC’s Advocacy Committee. As a member-driven organization, DOC aims to present a collective voice to institutions and industry partners.

=== Mandate ===
The Documentary Organization of Canada (DOC) is a member driven, not for profit, National Arts Service Organization, with charitable status. Its mandate is to:

1. Support, promote and develop the art form of documentary creation;
2. Advocate on behalf of its members to foster an environment conducive to documentary production; and
3. Strengthen the sector within the broader screen industry.

=== Reports ===
DOC’s advocacy work is informed by regular reports on the state of the documentary film industry. These reports are produced in collaboration with a variety of partners and provide data that supports lobbying efforts across the film and television sector.

== DOC Institute ==
DOC Institute is an initiative of the Ontario chapter of the Documentary Organization of Canada. After several vital Canadian programs for filmmakers closed their doors, DOC Ontario undertook extensive research and conducted interviews with documentary practitioners to determine what they needed to make their films, make connections and make it. The result of that research is the DOC Institute. With the aim of supporting doc-makers’ creative journeys, the DOC Institute is a hub for established and emerging voices in the non-fiction world. Through its program streams—the Masters Series, the Producers Exchange and DOC Connects—the DOC Institute offers essential professional development for documentary media artists of all levels.

== Programs ==
=== DocSHIFT ===
DocSHIFT is a program that facilitates new creative partnerships and helps develop innovative digital and interactive documentaries through mentorship, prototype development, project incubators, training workshops, interviews with innovators in the field, case study research and networking opportunities. It also includes the docSHIFT Index, a comprehensive library of digital documentaries.

DocSHIFT is an initiative of chapter organization, DOC Toronto, and is made possible with the support of the Ontario Media Development Corporation on behalf of the Ministry of Culture, in partnership with the CFC Media Lab, Hot Docs, the National Film Board of Canada, Toronto Metropolitan University, and the Bell New Media Fund.

=== Allan King Memorial Fund ===
In 2009, a documentary film giant, Allan King died and the documentary community came together to mark the loss with the creation of the Allan King Memorial Fund. The purpose of the commemorative fund was not only to honour their colleague, but to put money into the hands of the independent documentary filmmakers of the future. The fund was established by DOC with the filmmaker's family for the benefit of the Canadian documentary community.

=== Point of View ===
Point of View, also known as POV, is a magazine on documentary film. First established in 1990 by the DOC under the editorship of Wyndham Wise, it became independent in 2010 but remains in close collaboration with the DOC.

The magazine publishes feature content in paper form twice annually, but publishes news, reviews, interviews, and feature articles more regularly on its website.

== Timeline ==
1983 – First meetings, first intervention letter. CIFC is founded in Toronto.

1985 – First newsletter is sent - by fax. It eventually becomes POV Magazine.

1988 – Montreal chapter (later to be known as Quebec chapter) is formed.

1991 – A National Executive is formed - John Walker, President.

1991 – First edition of POV Magazine, edited by Wyndham Wise – Geoff Bowie, first Publisher.

1992 — The CIFC was instrumental in bringing new documentary strands to public airwaves, including CBC’s Witness and The Passionate Eye

1994 – The first edition of Hot Docs is held, now North America’s biggest documentary-focused film festival. Paul Jay was Chair of CIFC and Founding Chair of Hot Docs.

1995 – Atlantic chapter is formed.

1996 – BC chapter is formed.

1997 – Hot Docs incorporates as a separate charitable organization.

1998 – First coast-to-coast National Executive elected - Gary Marcuse, Chair.

2003 – The CIFC changes its name to DOC.

2004 — DOC Quebec co-founded the RIDM Forum, the industry component of North America’s largest francophone documentary festival.

2006 – Ottawa chapter is formed.

2006 – Newfoundland chapter is formed.

2007 – Winnipeg chapter is formed.

2008 – Alberta chapter is formed.

2009 – Newfoundland chapter folds.

2010 — DOC successfully advocated for the creation of the Canada Media Fund’s English POV Program.

2013 — The Ontario Chapter launched the DOC Institute, a dedicated hub providing professional development activities for non-fiction professionals.

2019 — DOC launched a two-year free membership program for Indigenous filmmakers, encouraging greater representation and equity in Canada’s film industry.

2020 — DOC launched Documentary Production in the Era of COVID-19: Best Practice by and for Documentary Filmmakers.

2021 — DOC launched a two-year free membership program for filmmakers who identify as Black, Indigenous, and/or Persons of Colour, encouraging greater representation and equity in Canada’s film industry.

== See also ==
- Hot Docs
- documentary (TV channel)
- Cinema of Quebec
- Cinema of Canada
- National Film Board of Canada
