= New York City (The Demics song) =

Single by The Demics

from the album Talk's Cheap
- Released: 1979
- Genre: New wave
- Length: 4:32
- Label: Ready Records (1979 release); Fringe Product (1994 distributor)
- Songwriter(s): Keith Whittaker, Rob Brent, Iain Atkinson-Staines and J. D. Weatherstone.

"New York City" is a Canadian single by The Demics released in 1979 from their debut EP, Talk's Cheap. William New of Groovy Religion is quoted in Chart magazine stating "Singer Keith Whittaker never really wanted to go to N.Y.C. Instead, this song is a gentle rib of fellow '70s New London Punks The Regulators and their Lou Reed fixation. The grass is not always greener. Re-issued recently isn't it time to pay the band some royalties?"

It was named the greatest Canadian song of all time in a 1996 poll by music magazine Chart. In the 2000 poll, the song dropped to number 5.

The song was re-issued on a 1996 Demics compilation titled New York City. The single also appears on a various artists 1999 compilation Spiked: a punk overview Retro 80's, Volume 5 released by EMI Music Canada.
