= Crash 'n' Burn (1977 film) =

- Directed by: Ross McLaren
- Starring: The Viletones; The Boyfriends; Dead Boys; Diodes; Teenage Head; Stiv Bators; Cheetah Chrome
- Music by: The Boyfriends; Dead Boys; Diodes; Teenage Head
- Distributed by: The Film-Makers' Cooperative (U.S.); Canadian Filmmakers' Distribution Centre (Canada)
- Release date: 1977
- Running time: 27.5 minutes
- Country: Canada
- Language: English

Crash 'n' Burn is an experimental film shot in and named after Toronto, Ontario's first punk club by Canadian filmmaker Ross McLaren in 1977. (Not to be confused with Peter Vronsky's 1977 documentary on Toronto Punk shot for the CBC television network.) The film, shot on 16mm black-and-white stock, features punk rock performances by The Viletones, Dead Boys, Teenage Head, The Boyfriends, and The Diodes at venues such as; the New Yorker Theater in Toronto and the CBGB, and the Times Square Motor Inn in New York City.

== Critical response ==
Village Voice critic Ed Halter called the film a "self-destructive document of Toronto's eponymous punk club."

The film's most frequently-quoted review, written almost one year after the initial screening, was published in Creem magazine in 1978. Creem hailed McLaren's work for "doing everything in its flickering power to self-destruct," and deemed the film a living testament that not all Canadians "bored their beef to death."

== Versions ==
McLaren's original work emphasized the cacophony and riotousness of the punk scene in 1977 Toronto. In 2004, he debuted a karaoke-style version of the film – complete with syncopated subtitles corresponding to the bands' song lyrics – to a test audience at the Millennium Film Workshop in New York City.

== Distribution ==
16mm prints of McLaren's film are exclusively distributed by The Film-Makers' Cooperative in the United States, and the Canadian Filmmakers' Distribution Centre in Canada.

Crash 'n' Burn has never been officially released on either VHS or DVD, though several bootleg VHS versions are rumoured to have been shown publicly since the 1990s, without official authorization from the filmmaker or his distributors.

== See also ==
- Punk film
- List of punk films
