= The Mysterious Moon Men of Canada =

- Directed by: Colin Brunton
- Written by: David McFadden; Colin Brunton; John Pearson
- Produced by: Colin Brunton; Bruce McDonald
- Starring: Gerry Quigley; Colin Brunton; Carmela Albero
- Cinematography: Gerald Packer
- Edited by: Bruce McDonald
- Music by: The Gun Club; Shadowy Men on a Shadowy Planet
- Distributed by: Screamin' Banshee Productions
- Release date: 1988
- Running time: 26 minutes
- Country: Canada
- Language: English

The Mysterious Moon Men of Canada is a Canadian short film, directed by Colin Brunton and released in 1988.

A mockumentary, the film centres on Brownie McFadden (Gerry Quigley), a documentary filmmaker who is trying to track down two men from Owen Sound, Ontario who flew to the moon in a homemade rocket in 1959 — ten years before the Apollo 11 mission — but were too polite to publicly take credit for the achievement. Although he fails in his quest to locate the space travellers, he undergoes a variety of other experiences, including losing his virginity to an older woman, and being followed by a blind cyclist who is travelling across Canada in a parody of Terry Fox's Marathon of Hope.

The cast includes Clarence Haynes, Lynn Haynes, Larry Hudson, Ron Cook, Ellen Dean and Marsh Phillips.

== Accolades ==
The film won the Genie Award for Best Live Action Short Drama at the 10th Genie Awards.
