= Talk's Cheap =

EP by The Demics
- Released: 1979
- Genre: Punk rock
- Length: 11:49
- Label: Ready
- Producer: Andrew Crosbie, Angus MacKay

Talk's Cheap is the debut EP by Canadian punk rock band the Demics, released in 1979 on Ready Records.

The EP's first single "New York City" was the band's breakthrough on campus radio and commercial station CFNY. It was later named the greatest Canadian song of all time in a 1996 reader's poll by the Canadian music magazine Chart.

== Track listing ==
1. "I Wanna Know" - 2:34
2. "You Tell Me" - 2:09
3. "Talk's Cheap" - 1:43
4. "New York City" - 4:32
5. "Oh Well" - 0:51

== Personnel ==
The Demics

- Keith Whittaker – vocals
- Rob Brent – guitars
- Iain Atkinson-Staines – bass
- James Weatherstone – drums

Additional personnel

- Lyndon Andrews – artwork
- Kevin Doyle – engineering
- Mike Hannay – photography
- Andrew Crosbie – production
- Angus MacKay – production
