= The Cardboard Brains =

Canadian punk rock band

The Cardboard Brains was a Toronto punk rock band from the first wave of punk rock and New Wave in the late 1970s and early 1980s. It helped define Toronto's 'Queen Street Circuit', playing clubs like The Edge and The Horseshoe Tavern.

Formed in 1976, the line-up included John Paul Young (vocals), Vince Carlucci (guitar), bassists Paul O'Connell, Patrick Gregory, Paul Cohen and Rob Ross, and drummers Richard Miller, Dave Richardson and Rey Rattan. The band went through different names including Media Accident, Deadly Alien Foam, and Psychiatric Prison before settling on Cardboard Brains.

In 1977, the band recorded a four-song EP which received local airplay with the songs "I Wanna Be A Yank" and a cover version of the Monkees hit "Stepping Stone". In 1978, the band next appeared in The Last Pogo, a concert documentary filmed at the Horseshoe Tavern. This version of the band was a typically loud, fast three-chord punk band of the era. In 1979, they recorded another four-song EP The Black EP which was in a more New Wave direction.

In 1980, Young went out on his own, performing all of his own instrumentation in a new set of recordings entitled The Life Of Ermie Scub. The band reunited for The Edge's anniversary celebration on April 26, 1981; recordings from this performance were released as a live album in 1982 before the band split up for good.

In 1982, the band released a limited-edition live album which was originally recorded as part of a live-to-air simulcast for radio station CFNY; in 1998, Young released a compilation CD.

Young won the "Most Promising Male Vocalist" award at the 1982 CASBY Awards in 1982 but left the music business to become an actor and do soundtrack and voice-over work. Patrick Gregory (who played bass in 1978–79) went on to become a member of prominent local independent bands The Woods Are Full Of Cuckoos and The Lawn. Vincent Carlucci produced The Lawn's first album, Peace in the Valley, and contributed two songs, "Love Will Find A Way (a.k.a. Science Has A Way)" and "Everybody's Running", to the Golden Reel Award-winning movie The Gate (directed by Tibor Takács (director) who also produced The Brains White and Black E.P.). In 1984, Carlucci formed Station Twang with Sandy Macfadyen, releasing one vinyl album, Secret Sides (1984), the CD Adam and Eve (1990), and one split single with Mr. Fizzer in 1991.

== Discography ==
- 1977 Cardboard Brains, 7" WHITE EP (Brainco Worldwide)

White EP Guitar: Vince Carlucci Drums: Richard Miller Bass: Paul O'Connell Vocals: John Paul Young Produced by Tibor Takacs

- 1979 Cardboard Brains, The Last Pogo Compilation. LP (Bomb Records), Reissued 2001 by EMI

The Last Pogo. Babies Run My World, Jungles Guitar: Vince Carlucci Bass: Patrick Gregory (AKA John Thomas on "Last Pogo" Liner notes) Drums: David Richardson Vocals: John Paul Young Produced by Keith Elshaw

- 1980 Cardboard Brains, 12" BLACK EP (Guilt Records)

Black EP Guitar: Vince Carlucci Bass: Patrick Gregory Drums: Mike Keena Vocals, Keyboards: John Paul Young Produced by Tibor Takacs

- 1981 John Paul Young, single Our Time Escapes/Fire Incensed As In Rage (Canadian Media Development Company)
- 1981 John Paul Young, The Life of Ermie Scub LP (CMDC)
- 1982 John Paul Young and Cardboard Brains Live at the Edge LP (CMDC)

Live at the Edge Guitar, Synths: Vince Carlucci Keyboards, Mellotron: Don Dingwall Drums: Rey Rattan Bass: Robert Ross Vocals, Synths: John Paul Young Produced by The CFNY Mobile Studio

- 1986 John Paul Young World within a Dream single (MEG Entertainment)
- 1989 Cardboard Brains Number 26 BOOTLEG. LP (Killed By Death)
- 1998 John Paul Young John Paul Young and Cardboard Brains compilation CD (MEG)
