= The Secrets (Canadian band) =

Toronto punk rock band

- Origin: Toronto, Ontario, Canada
- Genres: Punk, garage punk
- Years active: 1978–1981
- Labels: Bomb Records, Other People's Music
- Spinoff of: The Viletones
- Members: Freddie Pompeii; Chris Haight; John Hamilton; Mike Anderson

The Secrets were a Toronto punk rock band during the first wave of late 1970s punk. Their line-up consisted of Freddie Pompeii (vocals & harmonica), Chris Haight (guitar), John Hamilton (bass), and Mike Anderson (aka Motor X) on drums.

The band had been The Viletones with Pompei as guitarist and Haight on bass behind singer Steven Leckie. When that version of the band broke up in 1978 the band reformed without Leckie, with Pompei moving to vocals and Haight to guitar. John Hamilton, previously a drummer with The Diodes, joined on bass.

The Viletones was a typically loud, fast and angry punk band; The Secrets were more of a 1960s garage punk band similar to contemporary bands like the Flaming Groovies, Real Kids, and Teenage Head. Their sets included covers of songs like The Isley Brothers "Shout", Bo Diddley's "Diddy Wah Diddy", Arthur "Guitar Boogie" Smith's "Guitar Boogie", and "Zoom", a Doo-Wop song by the Collegians.

The band played extensively, mostly in Toronto, from 1978 to 1980, and they made a trip to New York to play Max's Kansas City.. They were also included in The Last Pogo film and soundtrack in 1978.

They recorded an album, Success Without College, in 1979 for Bomb Records. That was followed by a single, a cover of Roy Orbison's "Pretty Woman". The album received favourable reviews but they did not translate into sales. Then Pompeii was arrested on a drug charge and he had to return to his native Philadelphia, where he went into the newspaper business. Hamilton played with The Ugly Ducklings then left the music business.

Their debut album was re-released in 1997 with bonus live tracks.

The band appears in the 2013 documentary The Last Pogo Jumps Again.

Mike "Motor X Anderson" died in 2012, Pompeii died in 2017.

== Discography ==
- Success Without College, 1980, Bomb Records
- "Pretty Woman", (Single), 1980, Bomb Records
- Teenage Rampage, 1997, Other People's Music
