= Stephen Zoller =

Stephen Zoller (born 1952) is a Canadian film and television writer and producer. He is most noted for the film Metal Messiah, for which he received a Canadian Film Award nomination for Best Adapted Screenplay at the 28th Canadian Film Awards in 1977.

He began his career as a partner with Tibor Takács in the independent film studio Mega-Media Productions. He initially wrote Metal Messiah as a stage musical in 1975, before working with Takács to readapt it as a film.

Zoller and Takács then collaborated on the feature film The Tomorrow Man (1981), also known as 984: Prisoner of the Future. Their 1983 short film Snow was a Genie Award nominee for Best Theatrical Short Film at the 5th Genie Awards in 1984.

He later wrote other screenplays including Office Party and Windsor Protocol, and episodes of the television series Are You Afraid of the Dark? and Charlie Jade.
