= Noel Harding =

Canadian contemporary artist

Noel R. Harding
- Born: 21 December 1945; London, England
- Died: 26 May 2016 (aged 70); Toronto
- Known for: video artist installation artist public sculptor

Noel R. Harding (21 December 1945 – 26 May 2016) was a Canadian contemporary artist. He produced sculptures, installations, video works, and public artworks during an artistic career that spanned over forty years.

== Life ==
Noel Robert Harding was born 21 December 1945, in London England.

Harding taught in the Department of Fine Art at the University of Guelph between 1972 and 1979, and in the Department of Experimental Art at the Ontario College of Art between 1977 and 1982. From 1984 to 1995, he taught at the Academie voor Beeldende Kunst (AKI) in Enschede, The Netherlands and at the Dutch Art Institute (ArtEZ) in Enschede, in the International Post Graduate Program.

He died in Caledon, Ontario, on 26 May 2016, from sudden heart failure.

== Work ==
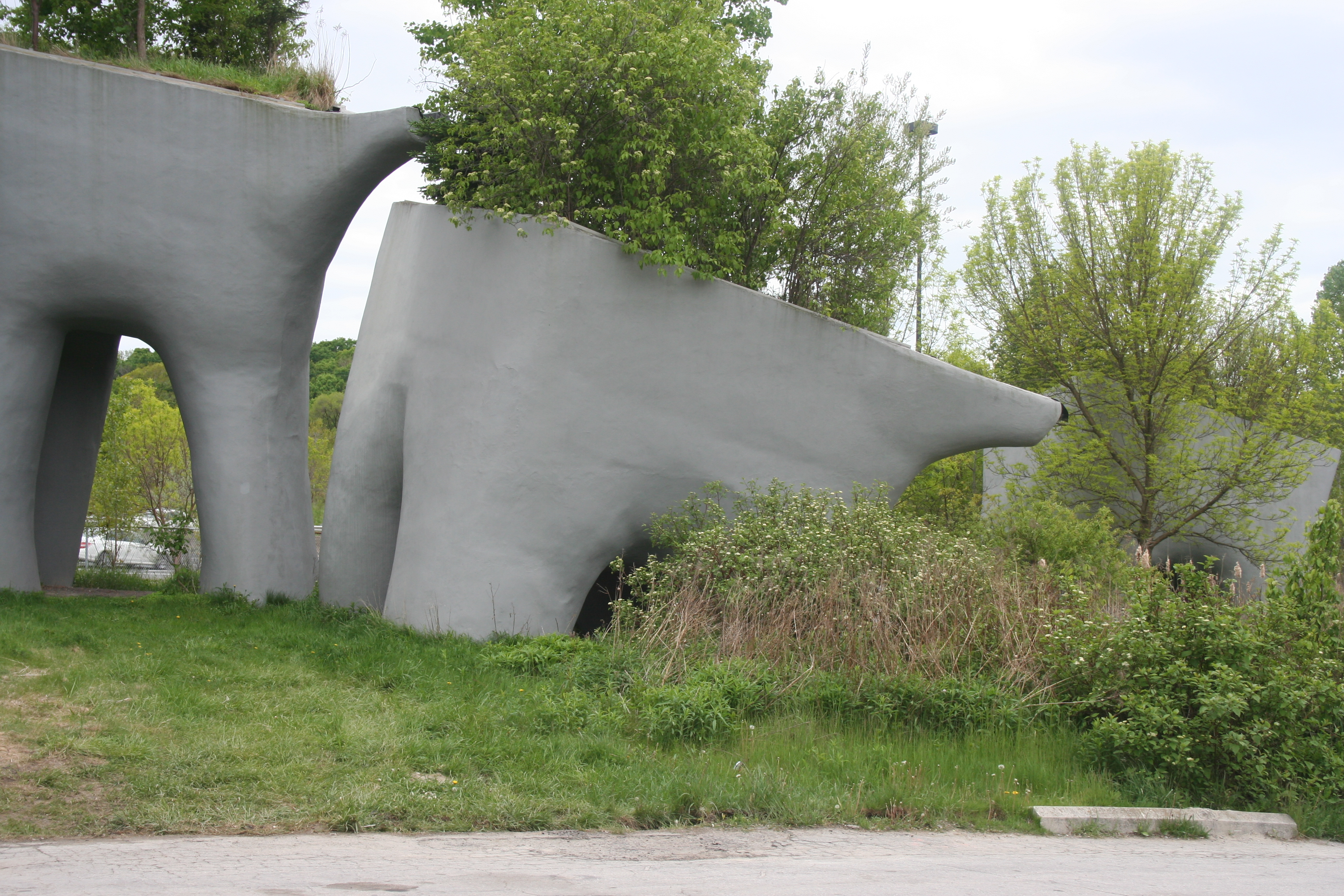
Noel Harding: The Elevated Wetlands

=== Video works ===
Harding initially became known as an artist through his video works in the early 1970s. Some of his video works include

- Untitled Using Barbara, 1973
- Birth’s Child, 1973
- Clouds, 1974
- Three Works for Mind/Body (versions 1 and 2), 1975
- Simplified Confusions, 1976
- A Serene Composition Suggestive of Pastoral Repose, 1977
- Yellow, 1979
- Out of Control, 1981
- Houses Belong to Those Who Live in them, 1982 and
- Elephants, 1983.

During the period that he was producing video art, Harding was a part of the Centre for Experimental Art and Communication that existed in Toronto between 1975 and 1978. In 1976, Harding was a founding member of the artist run video access centre Ed Video in Guelph Ontario.

=== Sculptural installations ===
In the 1980s, Harding built several installations around the theme of agriculture and the environment. In 1980 he was commissioned by the Ikon Gallery in Birmingham, England to produce the work Scenic Events on A Path of Upheaval. In Scenic Events, a small cart carrying live heads of lettuce traverses the gallery while goldfish swim in a wraparound tank along the gallery walls, and an overhead speaker relays the sound of bombs. Harding is reported to have made the work as a response to the Soviet–Afghan War that began in late 1979. In his 1981 piece Enclosure for a Conventional Habitat, he created a work that placed six live chickens on a conveyor belt with an automatic feeding mechanism. The piece brought the sight, sound and smell of food production into the art gallery environment.

=== Public art ===
From the 1990s until his death, Harding produced primarily public artworks. In 1990 he completed and installed "The Potato Eaters" at the Mississauga Civic Centre. This was followed by The Elevated Wetlands in 1997 and 1998. Installed in Taylor Creek park, Toronto, the piece consists of a set of elevated gardens supported on sculptures made of recycled polystyrene and acrylic. The sculptures act as a water filtration system, using solar panels to pump water from the adjacent Don River into the sculpture's elevated wetlands, where the water is purified organically. Elevated Wetlands is his most well known work.

In 2013 he installed the public sculpture Dawes Crossing at the intersection of Dawes Road and Victoria Park Avenue in Toronto, Ontario. The piece integrates the outline of a traditional barn with a solar wand wind-powered system that irrigates a small garden beneath the barn. The sculpture was negatively received by some local residents, who were confused as to what the purpose of the structure was.

His 2013 public artwork Raincatcher is installed outside the Edmonds Community Centre in Burnaby, British Columbia.

In 2015, Harding completed the public sculpture Reverb outside the General Motors Centre in Oshawa, Ontario. Harding also collaborated with CIMA+, DTAH and others to complete a master plan for the Alton Millpond landscape art and pond rehabilitation project in the community where he resided, Caledon, Ontario.

Just prior to his death in 2016, Harding had been selected to create a public artwork outside the Royal York (TTC) subway station in Toronto Ontario.

== Collections ==
Harding's work is included in the permanent collection of the National Gallery of Canada and the Canada Council Art Bank.
