= Colin Brunton =

Canadian producer and director

- Born: 1955 (age 69–70); Toronto, Ontario, Canada
- Occupation(s): Film producer, film director

Colin Brunton (born 1955) is a Canadian producer and director.

Brunton was born in Toronto, Ontario, Canada. After creating the short films The Last Pogo (1978), A Trip Around Lake Ontario (1988) and The Mysterious Moon Men of Canada (1989), Genie Award winner for Best Live Action Short), Brunton produced the feature films Roadkill (1989) and Highway 61 (1990) with director Bruce McDonald.

Brunton then went on to become the first executive director of The Feature Film Project, an initiative of Norman Jewison's Canadian Film Centre. Encouraging filmmakers to take risks, and giving them complete artistic freedom, from 1991 to 1995 he developed and then executive produced five feature films by first-time directors, producers and writers: Blood & Donuts, Cube, Rude, Shoemaker, and House. While faring poorly at the box office, they garnered generally favorable critical praise, and in two cases launched the healthy careers of two new directors: Clement Virgo with Rude and Vincenzo Natali with Cube.

After leaving the Feature Film Project, Brunton became a hired gun, working as a line producer, producer, and production manager on a variety of feature films including Hedwig and the Angry Inch, The Safety of Objects and Foolproof. His television producing credits include the sixth season of The Kids in the Hall, Little Mosque on the Prairie, Spun Out, The Newsroom, Our Hero, Schitt's Creek and Puppets Who Kill.

In 2007, Brunton completed the concert DVD Duality of Self featuring mysterious musician Jandek, and in 2013 he released the feature-length documentary The Last Pogo Jumps Again in collaboration with Kire Paputts. He was also in the 2007 movie How She Move.

He was line producer on Empire of Dirt, a film that was nominated in 2013 for Best Picture at the 2nd Canadian Screen Awards.
