= Cinema Canada =

Canadian film magazine

Cinema Canada (1972–1989) is a defunct Canadian film magazine, which served as the trade journal of record for the Canadian film and television sector. The magazine had its origins in the Canadian Society of Cinematographers (CSC), which began publishing a bi-monthly newsletter under the name Canadian Cinematography in 1962. In 1967, the publication's name was changed to Cinema Canada. In 1972, the CSC approached George Csaba Koller and Phillip McPhedran of Toronto to produce a glossier format. However, this association lasted only four issues, after which McPhedran resigned for personal reasons.

Koller continued to edit and publish the magazine, which became independent of the CSC in the fall of 1973. It was scrappy, provocative and ashamedly nationalistic. In March 1975, a non-profit organization, the Cinema Canada Foundation, was formed, and in September of that year it was transferred to Jean-Pierre Tadros and Connie Tadros, who moved the editorial office to Montreal while maintaining a Toronto office. Jean-Pierre had been the film critic for Le Devoir and editor of Cinema Quebec and had been a contributor to Cinema Canada. At first it was published 10 times a years, then it went monthly until its last issue in 1989. In all, there were 169 issues published over the span of 18 years.

A home for Canadian nationalists and cinema activists in the 1970s, Cinema Canada became the voice for The Council of Canadian Filmmakers, a lobby group of filmmakers and industry professionals campaigning for a quota for Canadian movies in the American-owned theatres. The Toronto office became a hub for the emerging Toronto New Wave in the 1980s, and Bruce McDonald edited Cinema Canada*'s "Outlaw" issue in the fall of 1988. Toronto's staff included, at one time or another, Tom Perlmutter (future National Film Board of Canada Commissioner), John Harkness (influential film critic for Now weekly), Cameron Bailey (future Toronto International Film Festival co-director) and Wyndham Wise, who would go on to publish and edit Take One: Film and Television in Canada (1992–2006), while the Montreal staff included René Balcer who went on to become an Emmy Award winning showrunner and TV series creator.

The impending GST and removal of postal subsidies in 1991 were the official reasons given when the magazine folded. The underlying truth, however, was that Cinema Canada had lost its reason for being. The production climate in Canada had changed considerably from the days in the early 1970s, and the magazine eventually lost its constituency.
