= Ross McLaren (filmmaker) =

Canadian artist and filmmaker

- Born: December 4, 1953; Sudbury, Ontario, Canada
- Died: November 28, 2023 (age 69); Brooklyn, New York
- Education: Ontario College of Art
- Known for: Filmmaker, Video artist
- Movement: Avant-Garde

Ross McLaren (December 4, 1953 – November 28, 2023) was a Canadian artist, filmmaker, and educator based in New York City.

== Biography ==
McLaren was born in 1953 in Sudbury, Ontario, Canada and graduated with honors from Ontario College of Art, where he also did post-graduate work. He was a faculty member at Cooper Union, Fordham University and Pratt Institute, and also taught at Millennium Film Workshop in New York City.

Following a stroke in July 2023, McLaren died in Brooklyn, New York on November 28, 2023.

== Work ==
=== Advocacy ===
Beginning in 1976, McLaren worked as a filmmaker, scholar, teacher, curator, critic, and community organizer. He founded and was first director of the Funnel Film Centre in Toronto, Ontario, Canada, an institution devoted to the production, exhibition, and distribution of film. As founder/director, McLaren encouraged continued recognition of film—particularly Super 8—in his native country.

=== Films ===
His films include: Crash 'n' Burn: the "self-destructive document of Toronto’s eponymous punk club," Wave, Weather Building, Dance of the Sacred Foundation Application (feat. Jack Smith), Sex Without Glasses, and the Ann Arbor Film Festival award-winning sensation Summer Camp.

A recipient of such prestigious grants as the Ontario and Canada Council awards, McLaren's works have been shown worldwide. His films screened at MoMA, Anthology Film Archives, the Menil Collection, the National Film Theatre in London, the Centre Georges Pompidou, the Biennale du Paris, Documenta VI, Jyväskylä University in Finland, and ARKEN Museum of Modern Art in Denmark. His work, which was presented in such esteemed venues as the Edinburgh, Toronto, and Oberhausen Film Festivals, is found in several permanent collections, including that of the American Federation of Arts, New York, the Arts Council of Great Britain, the Art Gallery of Ontario, Toronto, Ottawa’s National Film Archives and the National Gallery of Canada.

== Selected filmography ==
- Winning, 40 min (2005)
- Wave, 5 min. (2004)
- Dance of the Sacred Foundation Application (feat. Jack Smith), 15 min. (2003)
- Lapland, 3 min. (2002)
- Muted Horn, Squeaky Stool, 9:11 min. (2001)
- Another Story, S-8, 5 min. (1988)
- Spin, 16mm, 1 min. (1987)
- Warehouse Eyes, S-8 & 16mm, 13 min. (1986)
- Tilt, S-8, 3 min. (1985)
- Let's Run Amok, S-8, 3 min. (1984)
- Sex Without Glasses, 16mm 12:30 min. (1983)
- Calgary Girls, S-8, 5 min. (1983)
- Launch 5ive, S-8, 2:38 min. (1982)
- 9 X 12, 16mm, 1 min., (also microfiche insert for Impulse Magazine) (1979–81)
- Wednesday, January 17, 1979, 16mm, 4:40 min. (1979)
- Snorkel, 16mm. 10:10 min. (1976–79)
- Summer Camp, 16mm, 60 min. (1978)
- Crash 'n' Burn, 16mm, 27:45 (1977)
- I.E., 16mm, 14:45 min. (1976)
- Weather Building, 16mm, 10:15 min. (1976) (features weather beacon on the Canada Life Building)
- Baby Green, S-8, 10:15 min. (1974)

== Academic appointments ==
- Ontario College of Art, Toronto
- The Funnel Film Theatre, Toronto
- Fanshawe College, Fine Arts Dep’t., London
- The Cooper Union School of Art, New York
- Millennium Film Workshop, New York
- Fordham University: College at Lincoln Center, New York
- Koulu Lapland, Finland
- Pratt Institute, Brooklyn

== Selected awards and distinctions ==
- Albert Frank Toronto - Amsterdam Artist's Award
- Ann Arbor Film Festival Award (multiple)
- Black Maria Film Festival - Director's Citation
- Canada Council Grant, London Film Festival
- Canada Council Film Production Grant
- Ontario Arts Council Film Production Grant
- Ontario Arts Council Visual Arts Grant
- Parabola Arts Foundation Film Distribution Project

== See also ==
- Canada Life Building
- Crash 'n' Burn
- Diodes
- Punk film
- Stiv Bators
- Weather beacon
