= The Demics =

Canadian punk rock band

- Origin: London, Ontario, Canada
- Genres: Punk
- Years active: 1977–1980
- Labels: Ready; Huge Records (domestic); Other Peoples Music (international)
- Past members: Keith Whittaker; Rob Brent; Iain Atkinson-Staines; James Weatherstone; Steve Koch

The Demics were a Canadian punk rock band that formed in 1977 in London, Ontario.

== Biography ==
Originally formed in London, Ontario in 1977, the band consisted of vocalist Keith Whittaker, guitarist Rob Brent, bassist Iain Atkinson-Staines and drummer James Weatherstone. Through 1978, the band were rising stars in the Canadian punk scene. They recorded their debut EP in the fall of that year, and subsequently moved to Toronto to be closer to the centre of the punk scene. The EP's single, "New York City" released on Ready Records, was the band's breakthrough hit on CFNY in 1979.

Brent left the band and went on to form the post punk/new wave band, "Mettle" as guitarist and synth player. Brent was replaced by Steve Koch in the Demics. The band released a self-titled full-length album in 1980, but subsequently broke up due to internal tensions.

In 1996, a new CD compiling both of the band's original albums titled New York City was released domestically on Huge Records. Also that year, "New York City" was named the greatest Canadian song of all time in a reader poll by the music magazine Chart.

Vocalist Keith Whittaker died of cancer on July 16, 1996. Guitarist Rob Brent died of a heart condition on November 5, 2014 at the age of 57. Drummer James Weatherstone died in his sleep on July 18, 2021 at the age of 63.

== Discography ==
- 1979: Talk's Cheap
- 1980: The Demics
- 1981: The 400 Blows
- 1996: New York City

== See also ==
- Music of Canada
- Canadian punk rock
- List of bands from Canada
