= The Diodes =

Canadian punk rock band

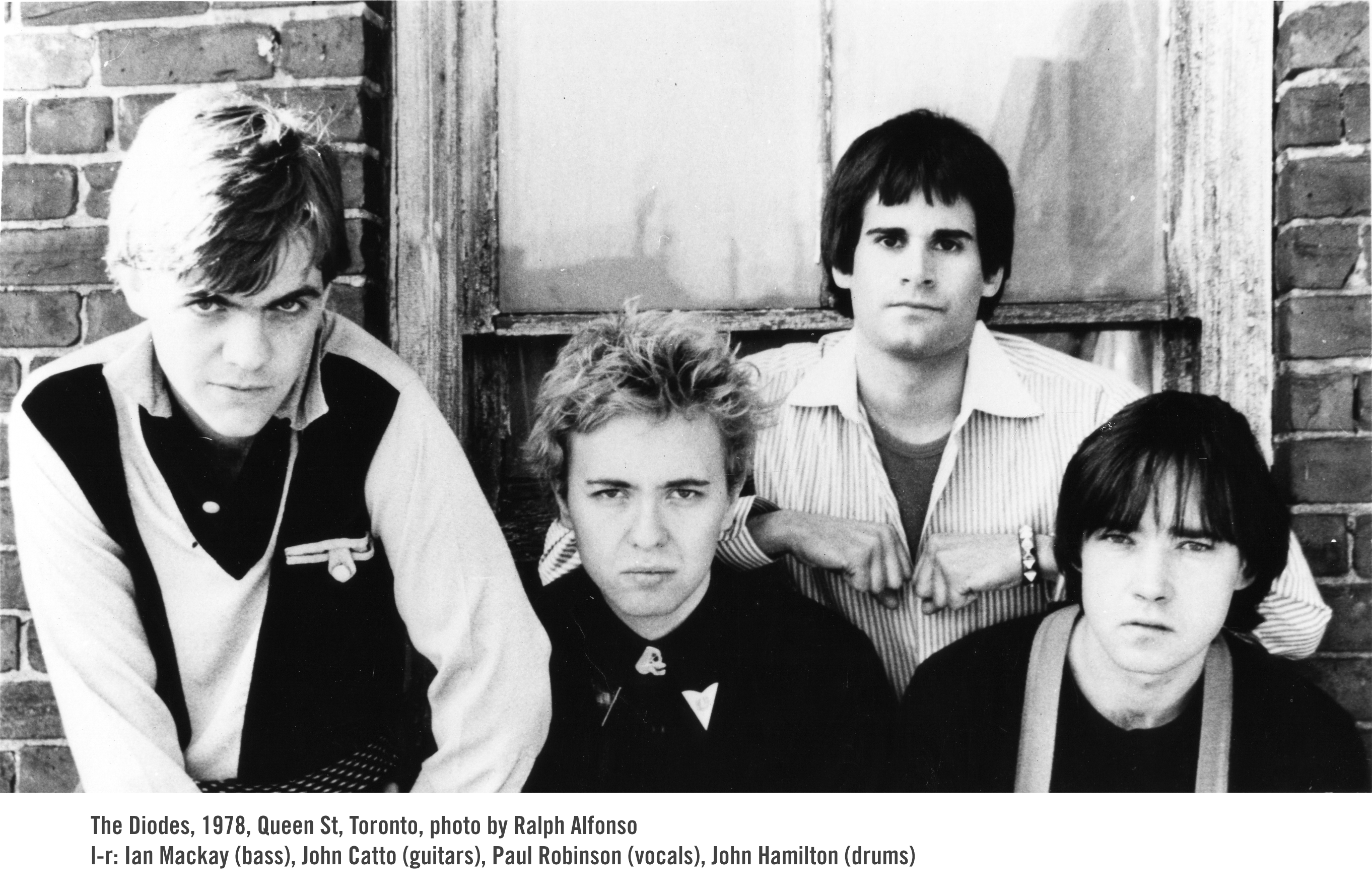
- From left to right: Ian Mackay, John Catto, Paul Robinson, and John Hamilton; Photo by Ralph Alfonso

Background information
- Origin: Toronto, Ontario, Canada
- Genres: Punk rock; power pop; new wave
- Years active: 1976–1982; 1999; 2007; 2010–2011; 2015
- Labels: Epic; Orient/RCA; Bongo Beat
- Past members: Mike Lengyell; John Corbett; Dave Clarkson; Steve Robinson; Richard Citroen; Paul Robinson; John Catto; Ian Mackay; John Hamilton; John Andrew
- Website: www.thediodestoronto.com

The Diodes were a Canadian punk rock band formed in 1976 in Toronto. They released five albums: Diodes (1977), Released (1979), Action-Reaction (1980), Survivors (1982), and Time/Damage Live 1978 (2010). They were one of the first Canadian bands to embrace this style of music and helped to foster the original core Punk scene in Toronto.

== History ==
The Diodes formed in October 1976 at OCAD University after a chance meeting between members. They played their first gig supporting Talking Heads in January 1977. The band, along with their manager Ralph Alfonso, went on to open Canada's first punk nightclub, the Crash 'n Burn, in June 1977. Many of the city's founding punk bands played in this iconic venue. The first groups to play the club were The Nerves, on a bill with The Diodes. Other international bands performing at the Crash 'n Burn included The Dead Boys. The club, which was housed in The Diodes' basement rehearsal space, was closed at the end of the summer of 1977, due to complaints by the Liberal Party of Ontario (the principal tenants of the building). The Crash 'n Burn was the subject of a movie by experimental filmmaker Ross McLaren, Crash 'n' Burn. Footage of the club also exists in the CBC Television archives because it was the subject of a TV special in 1977.

The band put out their first record in summer 1977, a single featuring Bruce Eves and Amerigo Maras of the Centre for Experimental Art and Communication (CEAC), an avant garde, performance art collective and gallery. Mickey Skin of the all-girl punk band The Curse spews profanities on one side, The Diodes provide musical backing with Paul Robinson counting down the spoken intervals, on the other. It was released on the Crash 'n' Burn label. One side was called "Raw", the other "War". It is considered one of the first punk records to come out of Canada. The single was actually part of an issue of the CEAC Newsletter (published by CEAC, the owners of the building that housed the Crash 'n' Burn club).

The Diodes played CBGBs in New York in July 1977 supporting The Cramps as part of a Toronto punk bill featuring The Viletones, Teenage Head, The Curse, The B Girls and The Dents. They signed to Columbia Records in Canada shortly afterward in August 1977, releasing their self-titled debut album The Diodes in October 1977. The release was produced by Bob Gallo and was accompanied by a single with two tracks from the LP. The A-side of the single featured a punk-rock deconstruction of the Cyrkle's sixties hit "Red Rubber Ball". The LP also included a cover of the Max Frost & The Troopers' "Shape of Things to Come" done in a similar style, along with eight original tunes written by the band. It was domestically released in Europe and Australia, however it was overlooked in the US and UK, where it was import only.

The Diodes were featured in the January 9, 1978 issue of Maclean's, on the cover and included in the article "The Class of '78: Introducing the New Elite". They were touted as the Canadians "we'll soon be talking about". Others included in this elite group included Wayne Gretzky and Conrad Black. On January 20, 1978 they opened for the Ramones and Runaways at the Aragon Ballroom in Chicago to an encore. The band also toured the U.S. east coast during the blizzard of 1978; performing in New York City, Boston, Philadelphia and Baltimore.

In 1979, the Diodes released their second Bob Gallo produced LP, on Epic Records in Canada, after a year of delays. Ironically titled Released, after the band's internal problems with the label, it again opened with the track "Red Rubber Ball". This was due to the song getting US airplay on the American CBS compilation album Permanent Wave. It was followed by nine original tracks, including the highly regarded single, "Tired of Waking Up Tired", which also got UK domestic release. Unlike the band's debut album, which was exported heavily to the United States by Jem and other record importers, Released was not widely distributed in US record stores and the band seemed to disappear in the minds of many of their fans outside of Canada.

1980 saw the release of the Diodes' third album, Action/Reaction on the independent label Orient Records, distributed by RCA. It was produced by Ian Gunther and Willi Morrison. The band performed concerts in Los Angeles supported by The Circle Jerks and Agent Orange. They also played in San Francisco. The year was rounded off by a cross Canada tour with U2, Ultravox, Gary Numan and Split Enz.

In 1981, John Catto and Paul Robinson moved to London, England to launch a short-lived version of The Diodes with a new rhythm section consisting of bassist Steve Robinson (ex-Barracudas) and drummer Richard Citroen (ex-Loved Ones). An album of new material was recorded, but remains unreleased. This version of The Diodes toured Ontario in 1982, to promote the group's fourth album Survivors, a compilation of unreleased outtakes, demos, and live recordings (from the first two albums, live with John Hamilton on drums, plus demo recordings with Mike Lengyell on drums).

Upon returning to England, the group metamorphosed into High Noon (consisting of John Catto, Paul Robinson, Steve Robinson, David Buckley (ex-Barracudas, backing vocals), and drummer Rick Zsigmond) in 1983. High Noon lasted until 1985 and were regulars playing around the London scene including headlining The Embassy club and the Marquee Club on Wardour Street. The band also recorded sessions which remain unreleased. High Noon peaked playing an anti-heroin charity gig at The Moonlight Club in West Hampstead supported by The Stone Roses, which culminated in a jam session including High Noon, The Stone Roses and Pete Townshend playing the songs "Substitute" and "The Kids are Alright". The group gradually disbanded, with each member going his own way, and singer Paul Robinson and guitarist John Catto remaining in London, England.

"Tired of Waking Up Tired" was listed at No. 23 in the book The Top 100 Canadian Singles, by Bob Mersereau, published by Goose Lane Editions.

On July 2, 2011, The Diodes were voted "Best Toronto Band. Ever" in a contest run by the Toronto Star. Readers voted for them over the course of a month, beating out such peers as Rush, The Tragically Hip, Martha and the Muffins and others.

== Reunions and new releases ==
In 1998, Sony Music released Tired of Waking Up Tired: The Best of The Diodes on CD, and in 1999, the band reunited in 1999 to perform one song on The Mike Bullard Show to promote that CD. On May 24, 2007, The Diodes (Robinson, Mackay, Catto) played the Cavern Club in Liverpool as part of the International Pop Overthrow Festival. On May 25, 2007, they did an afternoon concert at Lennon's Bar in Liverpool, also as part of the festival. On June 9, 2007, the original lineup from the first album (Robinson, Mackay, Catto, Hamilton) reunited for 30th anniversary concerts for the NXNE festival. They performed a free afternoon concert at Sankofa Square (then named Yonge-Dundas Square) and a midnight show at Sneaky Dees. A live vinyl album of a 1978 concert, Time Damage was released on Rave Up Records (Italy) in February 2010. Action-Reaction is now on iTunes on Bongo Beat Records (including bonus tracks from the Survivors album) and the physical CD released in January 2012. New tour dates were announced for 2015.

The original 1977 line-up (Robinson, Catto, Mackay, Hamilton) re-united again in 2010 for touring and recording. They performed at The Horseshoe (Toronto), Call The Office (London), Starlight (Waterloo), This Ain't Hollywood (Hamilton), Road to Ruins Festival (Rome, Italy), Pop Corn Club (Venice, Italy), and The Sound Of Music Festival (Burlington, Canada; with The New York Dolls). The 1977 line-up toured Canada again in November, 2011, but added original 1976 drummer Bent Rasmussen (also of Johnny & The G-Rays) behind the kit while John Hamilton could finally play his album keyboard parts live. The Diodes also presented awards at the 2011 Hamilton Music Awards on November 19 and also November 20.

A documentary about the band Circa 1977 The Diodes, directed by Aldo Erdic, premiered at NXNE 2010.

In 2015, the Diodes reunited once again for a five-city tour: The Phoenix (Toronto), Manantler Brewery (Bowmanville), This Ain't Hollywood (Hamilton), the Brantford Station Gallery (Brantford) and the Phi Centre (Montreal). At the exclusive show for Manantler Brewery in Bowmanville, the Diodes celebrated the creation of their own beer—Time Damage, IPA. The tour revealed a dynamic, re-energized Diodes driven by the powerful Keith Moon-style playing of new British drummer John Andrew making his Canadian debut, and perfectly complementing lead guitarist John Catto's Townsend stylings. Original drummer John Hamilton continued in his keyboard role contributing deep-bass synth a la Nine Inch Nails and Jon Lord Hammond accents adding a Prog dimension to the Diodes' proto-Punk.

== Members ==
- Paul Robinson – vocalist
- John Catto – guitarist
- Ian Mackay – bassist
- John Hamilton – drummer/keyboards
- John Andrew – present drummer (2015)
- Mike Lengyell – drummer
- David Clarkson – bassist (on "Raw"/"War" single only)
- John Corbett – bassist (not on any recordings)
- Bent Rasmussen – drums (not on any recordings)
- Steve Robinson – bassist (not on any released recordings)
- Richard Citroen – drums (not on any released recordings)

== Discography ==
- 1977 The Diodes
- 1979 Released
- 1980 Action/Reaction
- 1982 Survivors
- 2010 Time/Damage Live 1978
- 2017 Rarities

== See also ==
- List of 1970s punk rock musicians
