= The Viletones =

Canadian punk band

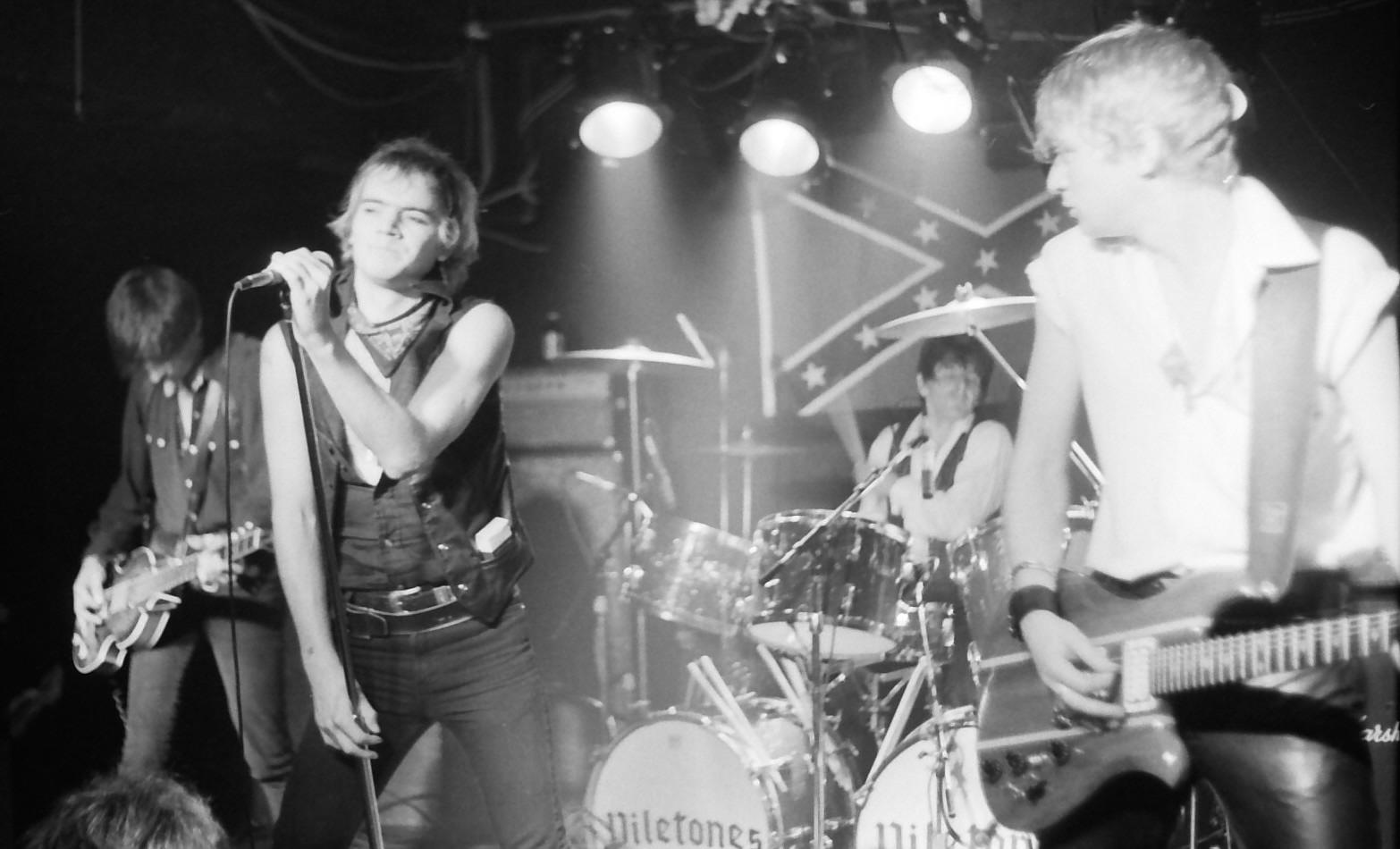
- The Viletones perform at Larry's Hideaway, Toronto, 1980

Background information
- Origin: Toronto, Ontario, Canada
- Genre: Punk rock
- Years active: 1977–2016
- Labels: Vile, Razor, Fleurs du Mal, Other People's Music
- Past members: Freddie Pompeii; Chris Hate; Mike Anderson; Jim Hare; Steven Leckie
- Website: viletonesofficial.com

The Viletones were a Canadian punk band from Toronto led by Steven Leckie on vocals. Other members from the original line-up were Freddie Pompeii, (some sources list him as 'Frederick DiPasquale') on guitar; Chris Hate (Chris Paputts), on bass guitar, and Mike Anderson on drums. The original line-up was active in 1976 and 1977, and thereafter featured Steven Leckie as the only original member, with various backing musicians.

== Career ==
=== Early period ===
The Viletones were one of the first generation punk rock bands from Toronto. Steven Leckie founded the band, and footage of the band can be found on the official Viletones website. They appeared on the front cover of various magazines, including Leckie on the front cover of Record Week and Fanfare.

July 7–10, 1977, the group joined The Diodes and Teenage Head at the New York punk club CBGB at a showcase featuring "three outrageous punk bands from Toronto, Canada". The rock critic Lester Bangs described the show in an April 29, 1981, article for the Village Voice: "This guy Nazi Dog hung from the rafters, crawled all over the stage, and hurled himself on the first row until his body was one huge sore." The concert was spoofed in an early episode of the television comedy show SCTV, where comedian Rick Moranis as newscaster David Brinkley, looking a little rough, reviews a Viletones concert.

=== Recording period ===
Also that year, The Viletones released their first single, "Screamin Fist" b/w "Possibilities" and "Rebel" on their own label Vile Records.

In 1978, they released Look Back In Anger, which featured the songs "Don't You Lie" and "Dirty Feeling", b/w "Back Door To Hell", "Swastika Girl" and "Danger Boy". The same year Pompeii, Hate and X abruptly left The Viletones to form The Secrets. That year, the new lineup of the Viletones appeared at the concert The Last Pogo, filmed at the Horseshoe Tavern in Toronto May 1, 1978, and became a feature film documentary, which was followed by a sequel in 2013.

At the Rock Against Radiation concert in Nathan Phillips Square, Toronto, on July 19, 1980, The Viletones shared a bill with DOA, Stark Naked and the Fleshtones, Forgotten Rebels and Joe College and The Rulers.

In 1983, The Viletones released their first full-length album, Saturday Night, Sunday Morning, recorded live at Larry's Hideaway in Toronto. Later that decade, they released a U.S.-only release, Live At Max's. In 1994, the record label Other Peoples Music, released a retrospective, A Taste Of Honey. Leckie also ran an art gallery in Toronto called Fleurs Du Mal; notable patrons included The Sex Pistols manager Malcolm McLaren. Leckie discovered and mentored various young artists whom later went on to be auctioned at Waddington's and Ritchie's. Leckie also made a brief appearance in the film, American Psycho.

A reference to their song, "Screamin Fist", turned up in the pages of Neuromancer, a novel by William Gibson, and a computer virus was also named after the song.

Over time, other members of the Viletones included Screamin' Sam Ferrara (bass), Tony Vincent (drums), Steve Koch (guitar), Steven Stergiu (guitar), Conrad Wiggins (guitar), Ian Blurton (guitar), Scott McCullough (guitarist of Rusty and former Doughboy), Jeff Zurba (drums), Steve Scarlet (guitar).

After a reunion, the Viletones released their first commercial music video, which received regular rotation on Much Music, MTV (America & Europe) and some coverage on the BBC. The first comeback show with the new lineup was recorded live by Doug McClement and was released soon after. It featured live material and three new tracks written by Leckie and Stergiu, and was their first new material since the early 1980s. This release was called What It Feels Like To Kill (1998). Leckie and Stergiu then relocated to London and formed a British version of the band.

=== 2000 onwards ===
In November 2012, Steven Leckie posted an obituary for original drummer, Mike "Motor X" Andersen, on his Facebook page, which was featured in Now Magazine. Leckie has also performed as a spoken word artist, reading from his yet unpublished autobiography tentatively titled 'Screamin Fist', and has appeared on various panels and discussion groups on the subject of addiction and recovery.

The Viletones final performances were on August 15, 2015, despite Leckie's battle with multiple sclerosis, which was filmed in 3-D by Regg Hartt for Cineforum. and in 2016 at This Ain't Hollywood in Hamilton Ontario.

Leckie died in June 2025, at the age of 67. He had been living with multiple sclerosis and was diagnosed with lung cancer in 2023.

== Discography ==
=== Singles and EPs ===
- 1977 "Screaming Fist" (7-inch single: "Screaming Fist", "Possibilities", "Rebel")
- 1978 Look Back In Anger (7-inch EP: "Don't You Lie", "Dirty Feelin", "Back Door To Hell", "Swastika Girl", "Danger Boy")
- 2013 "Auschwitz Jerk" (7-inch single: "Auschwitz Jerk", "Wet Dream Girl", "Heinrich Himmler")
- 2025 "Haunted By Love" " Connie Chrom3 featuring Steven Leckie" ( All music streaming platforms)

=== Albums ===
- 1983 Saturday Night, Sunday Morning
- 1994 A Taste of Honey (recorded 1977)
- 1998 What It Feels Like to Kill (As "Steven Leckie & Viletones")
