= Emmett/Furla Oasis =

American film production company

Emmett/Furla Oasis Films
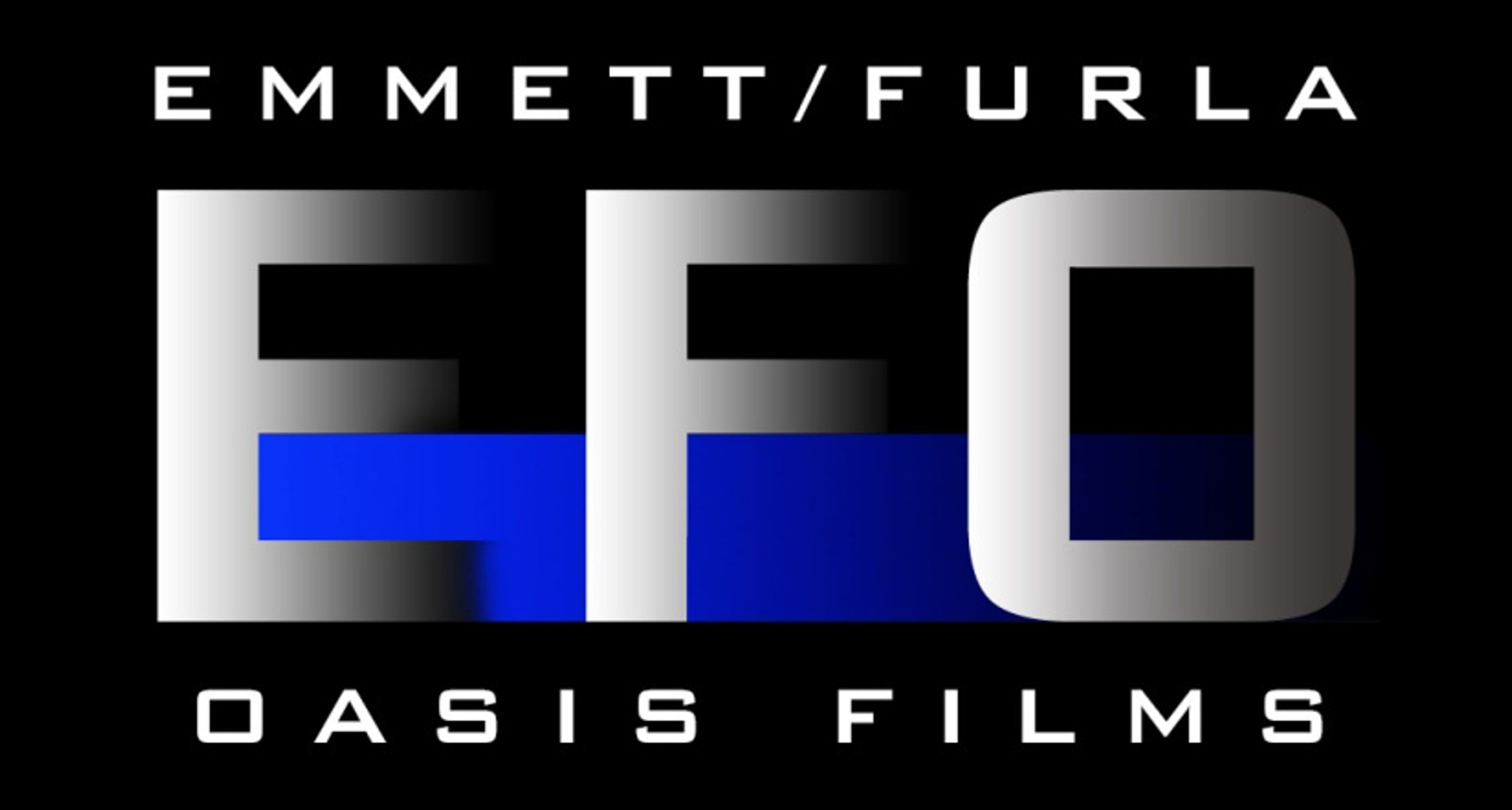
- Formerly: Emmett/Furla Films (1998–2013)
- Type: Private
- Industry: Film
- Founded: 1998
- Founders: Randall Emmett; George Furla
- Defunct: 2020
- Fate: Bankruptcy
- Headquarters: Beverly Hills, California, United States
- Key people: Randall Emmett; George Furla (CEOs)
- Products: Motion pictures; Television programs
- Owner: EFO (49%)
- Website: www.efofilms.com

Emmett/Furla Oasis Films (EFO Films), previously known as Emmett/Furla Films and Oasis Ventures Entertainment separately, was an American film and television production and financing company founded by Randall Emmett and George Furla in 1998. It is notable for funding and producing the films End of Watch, 2 Guns and Lone Survivor.

In 2018, the company was acquired by Helios and Matheson Analytics, which gained a 51% ownership stake in EFO. It began producing films under MoviePass. Two years later, following a litany of civil and federal lawsuits against HMNY and EFO, in combination with controversy surrounding the latter's business practices and workplace issues, the former filed for Chapter 7 bankruptcy in late 2019, with both the latter and MoviePass dissolving their partnership and ending operations a year later.

== History ==
=== Foundation (1998) ===
The company was founded as Emmett/Furla Films by Randall Emmett and George Furla in 1998.

=== Production of films and financial success (1999–2013) ===
The company's first production was the direct-to-video film, Escape to Grizzly Mountain, which was released in 2000.

They continued producing other films from 2001 to 2013. They include Held for Ransom, Ticker, Narc, Control, Edison, 16 Blocks, Home of the Brave, Borderland, Rambo, Righteous Kill, Freelancers, End of Watch and Broken City.

=== Merger with Oasis Ventures and continued productions (2013–17) ===
The company was later joined by Dubai-based financier Oasis Ventures Entertainment on July 22, 2013. Emmett said, "We are excited about working with Oasis and really see tremendous synergy. We will continue financing our bigger budget studio co-productions and will be more aggressive than ever in our financing commitments." The now-renamed Emmett/Furla Oasis Films celebrated the fifteenth anniversary of its foundation in September.

In between the EFF-Oasis merger, the companies released two of its successful box office films in 2013 (in association with Universal Pictures), 2 Guns and Lone Survivor.

In 2013, EFO financed its only syndicated television series, SAF3, which would later be cancelled the following year after one season. That September, they signed a deal which Toronto-based company, Corsan N.V. invested $125 million in the film label.

On June 3, 2014, Emmett/Furla Oasis Films signed a first-look deal with Craig Piligian's Pilgrim Studios to develop and produce docu-series and other unscripted shows.

=== MoviePass Films and dissolution (2018–20) ===
In May 2018, Helios and Matheson Analytics, the parent company of MoviePass, acquired the option to purchase the assets of Emmett/Furla Oasis Films plus gain its executives' expertise in making films for a new subsidiary, MoviePass Films. The new company would be 51% owned by Helios and the remaining 49% by EFO. By early-August 2018, Helios and Matheson completed the acquisition of the company's assets. Therefore, EFO was converted into an in-name-only subsidiary of MoviePass Films. The first film produced under the MoviePass Films name was announced to be 10 Minutes Gone starring Bruce Willis, which the first of a three film pact with Willis. In late-September 2018, the company acquired equity stakes and co-distribution in the two Neon-distributed films, Monsters and Men and Border.

MoviePass' quarterly revenue began to decrease by April 2019, with subscribers falling from over 90% to 225,000. Around October 2019, after announcing their Chapter 7 bankruptcy filing a month prior, HMNY effectively dissolved ongoing operations of MoviePass. As a result of Helios and Matheson's bankruptcy filing and MoviePass' closure on January 28, 2020, Emmett/Furla Oasis Films (being a part-owned subsidiary of the latter) ceased operations. The company's website was shut down.

MoviePass Films was the only company to bear the MoviePass name after MoviePass was shut down on January 28, 2020. The final film produced under that name was the EFO co-financed Boss Level, which was released in early 2021 on Hulu.

=== Reunions (2021–present) ===
After the closure of EFO, both Randall Emmett and George Furla, the company's co-founders, continued producing films under the company name in-credit, starting with The War with Grandpa (2020) and continuing so on, with High Rollers (2025) as its most recent film.

== Legal issues and other controversies ==
On October 23, 2015, Grindstone, a division of Lionsgate, sued EFO over the rights to the film, Bus 657. Six days later, Morgan Creek Entertainment and the estate of Tupac Shakur filed suit against the label over the financing of the rapper's biopic, All Eyez on Me, claiming breach of agreement. The plaintiffs stated they demanded a renewed 50-percent agreement from co-founders Randall Emmett and George Furla after the film's budget exceeded over $34 million; the defendants refused.

Nemesis Finance had filed a lawsuit in June 2016 against Randall Emmett/George Furla Productions and also both of them as individuals for breach of contract, fraud and violating the RICO Act. The suit had claimed Nemesis faced losing $1.6 million after producers Randall Emmett and George Furla allegedly misrepresented the amount of debt owed to investors so that they could reduce the residuals reserve deposits required by the major guilds. The case was settled in September 2016. In a joint statement announcing the settlement, the parties said they have "amicably resolved the dispute…and look forward to continuing an ongoing business relationship."

On August 18, 2017, director Jonathan Baker filed a lawsuit against Emmett/Furla Oasis Films over breach of contract and fraudulent inducement over a two way co-finance and production deal. Jonathan Baker claims Randall Emmett told him if he agreed to Inconceivable he'd return the favor by co-financing and producing a film of Baker's choosing. According to the agreements Baker and Emmett Furla entered into, the suit states, Baker was to be paid $125K for directing fee and it was later agreed that he would also have 49% of the copyright. The producing fee for Baker Entertainment was to be $425K and $550K for Emmett Furla. He entered into the agreement because he was told that in order to do his passion project Fate, he would have to do one of their films first. However, the suit states, shortly after Baker put the $1M into escrow in exchange to become the only equity player, the filmmaker says in the suit that Emmett/Furla began paying themselves $650,000 (each) in producer fees, said Baker, and then brought in more equity players and paid them out first in breach of their initial contract. He is seeking at least $4.5M in damages and has asked for a jury trial. As of August 18, 2017, Martin Barab (attorney for Emmett/Furla) advised The Hollywood Reporter that Baker Entertainment had already been repaid half of its investment in the weeks since the film's June 30 release. He described the suit is "bogus and frivolous."

In March 2019, The Boies/Schiller Film Group filed suit on Tuesday, accusing Emmett/Furla Oasis Films of breaching a deal to produce two Escape Plan sequels starring Sylvester Stallone. According to the suit, Boies/Schiller put up a $6 million loan for the $65 million project. The arrangement also gave Boies/Schiller rights to finance and produce the sequels, Escape Plan 2: Hades and Escape Plan: The Extractors. Boies/Schiller alleges that Emmett/Furla Oasis Films breached that agreement, and did not allow Boies/Schiller to put up financing for the sequels. The suit claims Emmett/Furla also failed to pay an executive producing fee on each of the two movies.

Oasis Ventures Entertainment sued MoviePass Films on October 14, 2019 over the theft of films and for lack of consent from Oasis in making the deal with Helios and Matheson.

On July 1, 2021, Blumhouse Productions sued EFO and Hulu over the rights to their film, Boss Level.

By June 2022, the defunct EFO faced a $25 million debt as a result of the civil and federal lawsuits they faced. That same month, actor Bruce Willis (on behalf of his former attorney) accused company co-founder Randall Emmett of mistreatment during his health issues. Willis claims that Emmett and other affiliates of EFO "pushed him to keep working" despite his battle with aphasia. Worse for Emmett, a Los Angeles Times news article was published at the same time, accusing him of racial or gender discrimination, employment abuse, termination and retaliation at the company's California offices and outside. In one lawsuit, Emmett was accused by a former employee of making racial slurs against him, including the employee's race, as well as other slurs about rappers Quavo, Cardi B and former partner 50 Cent (with whom Emmett co-founded another film label, Cheetah Vision, in 2008). The plaintiff also accused Emmett of hiding a Rolls-Royce in an insurance fraud scam and ordering him to retrieve a supply of cocaine. His scandals were later exploited on the Hulu documentary, The Randall Scandal: Love, Loathing and Vanderpump, which premiered on May 22, 2023.

Between 2022 and 2023, former employees sued EFO for racial discrimination, workplace harassment and wrongful termination.

In October 2024, Baker Entertainment, LLC. sued Emmett Furla Oasis Holdings, LLC. for breach of contract, fraud and breach of fiduciary duty. The plaintiff accused the latter of breaching an agreement on a co-financing partnership which was signed in 2015.

== Films ==
- 2000 – Escape to Grizzly Mountain
- 2000 – Andrew Dice Clay: I'm Over Here Now
- 2000 – Held for Ransom
- 2001 – Ticker
- 2001 – Good Advice
- 2002 – Hard Cash
- 2002 – Gentlemen of the Hunt
- 2002 – Narc
- 2002 – The Badge
- 2002 – Try Seventeen
- 2003 – Out for a Kill
- 2003 – Wonderland
- 2003 – Blind Horizon
- 2003 – Belly of the Beast
- 2004 – A Love Song for Bobby Long
- 2004 – Control
- 2005 – Edison
- 2005 – Submerged
- 2005 – Today You Die
- 2005 – Before It Had a Name
- 2006 – 16 Blocks
- 2006 – Mercenary for Justice
- 2006 – Lonely Hearts
- 2006 – The Wicker Man
- 2006 – The Contract
- 2006 – Home of the Brave
- 2007 – Klopka
- 2007 – King of California
- 2007 – 88 Minutes
- 2007 – Shortcut to Happiness
- 2007 – White Air
- 2007 – Borderland
- 2007 – Finding Rin Tin Tin
- 2008 – Day of the Dead
- 2008 – Righteous Kill
- 2008 – Major Movie Star
- 2009 – Thick as Thieves
- 2009 – Streets of Blood
- 2010 – Once Fallen
- 2010 – Mercy
- 2010 – Gun
- 2011 – Setup
- 2011 – Touchback
- 2011 – Catch .44
- 2012 – Lay the Favorite
- 2012 – Playback
- 2012 – Freelancers
- 2012 – Fire with Fire
- 2012 – End of Watch
- 2012 – Alex Cross
- 2013 – Broken City
- 2013 – Empire State
- 2013 – The Frozen Ground
- 2013 – Escape Plan
- 2013 – 2 Guns
- 2013 – Lone Survivor
- 2014 – The Prince
- 2015 – Vice
- 2015 – 90 Minutes in Heaven
- 2015 – Heist
- 2015 – Extraction
- 2016 – Exposed
- 2016 – Marauders
- 2016 – Silence
- 2017 – Arsenal
- 2017 – Aftermath
- 2017 – Inconceivable
- 2017 – First Kill
- 2018 – Acts of Violence
- 2018 – A Vigilante
- 2018 – Gotti
- 2018 – Escape Plan 2: Hades
- 2018 – The Row
- 2018 – Reprisal
- 2018 – Backtrace
- 2019 – Escape Plan: The Extractors
- 2019 – 10 Minutes Gone
- 2019 – Trauma Center
- 2020 – Survive the Night
- 2020 – Force of Nature
- 2020 – Hard Kill

=== Films credited to Emmett/Furla Oasis Films following dissolution ===
- 2020 – The War with Grandpa
- 2021 – Boss Level
- 2021 – American Traitor: The Trial of Axis Sally
- 2021 – Out of Death
- 2021 – Midnight in the Switchgrass
- 2021 – Survive the Game
- 2021 – Fortress
- 2022 – Fortress: Sniper's Eye
- 2022 – Wrong Place
- 2022 – Wire Room
- 2022 – Savage Salvation
- 2022 – Detective Knight: Rogue
- 2022 – Detective Knight: Redemption
- 2023 – Detective Knight: Independence

=== Films credited to Convergence Entertainment Group ===
- 2024 – Cash Out
- 2025 – Alarum
- 2025 – High Rollers
- 2026 – The Gentleman Thief
- 2026 – Conspiracy of Thieves

== Television ==
- 2013–14 – SAF3
- 2014–20 – Power (Note: Only credited to Randall Emmett)
- 2021–23 – BMF (Note: Only credited to Randall Emmett)
