= High Rollers (film) =

Film by Ives (Randall Emmett)

- Theatrical release poster
- Directed by: Ives
- Written by: Chris Sivertson
- Produced by: Joel Cohen; Alissa Holley; Gwen Osbourn; Sean Stone
- Starring: John Travolta; Gina Gershon; Lukas Haas; Quavo; Danny Pardo; Kelly Greyson; Joel Cohen; Alex Hurt
- Cinematography: Alejandro Lalinde
- Edited by: Marc Fusco
- Music by: Yagmur Kaplan
- Production companies: Convergence Entertainment Group; Transparency Media; Highland Film Group
- Distributed by: Saban Films
- Release date: March 14, 2025
- Running time: 102 minutes
- Country: United States
- Language: English
- Box office: $72,805

High Rollers is a 2025 American action thriller film directed by Ives, written by Chris Sivertson, and starring John Travolta, Gina Gershon, Lukas Haas, Quavo, Danny Pardo, Kelly Greyson, and Alex Hurt. It is a sequel to Cash Out (2024).

The film was released on March 14, 2025.

== Plot ==
After leaving the criminal world, Mason and his lover Amelia go on vacation. Meanwhile, his technician accomplice Link falls in love with Georgios Caras, the bank manager from a previous robbery. They held their wedding ceremony on an island, and in addition to Mason and Amelia, Mason's brother Shawn and his friends Anton and Hector were also present. Suddenly, an armed force led by Abel Salzar disrupted the wedding and kidnapped Amelia. They then discovered that the data on the Salzar hard drive on the server had been wiped. Mason learns that Salzar wants to take Amelia hostage to force them to carry out a mission.

Salzar's lawyer, Mr. Flowers, claims that Mason's team will break into Scarlet Pearl Casino and steal an item from a safe in a penthouse room. The casino is run by crime boss Zade Black, who is also Salzar's brother and an adversary. In order to rescue Amelia, Mason leads Shawn, Link, Anton, Hector, and Callas to infiltrate the casino under new identities. Salzar, through his informants, remotely monitors their every move.

Mason and Shawn found only a crypto wallet hard drive in the safe. The hard drive belonged to Salzar's ex-girlfriend, Bella, who is now Black's girlfriend and casino manager. Mason deduced that Salzar wanted the hard drive in the secret vault to prevent it from falling into Salzar's hands. Later, Link discovered that Caras was Salzar's informant and the one who secretly wiped the server, so he angrily kicked him out. Mason discovers the hard drive is hidden inside Bella's ruby necklace, and steals the necklace. After Mason and his group were exposed, they were captured by Black; Caras appeared to help them and ambushed Black, who was then shot and killed by Bella. Bella claims that Black took her encrypted wallet hard drive.

Mason and his men began to retreat, but were stopped by Salzar. Salzar claimed he wanted revenge on Mason, so he forced Mason to choose between Amelia's life and Shawn's. At this moment, a large number of FBI agents appeared to arrest both parties; it turned out that Mason had already exchanged terms with the FBI. Mason handed over Salzar's hard drive and the secret vault to the FBI in exchange for the release of himself and his team. Finally, Shawn revealed Bella's encrypted wallet hard drive, claiming they now have $600 million.

== Cast ==
- John Travolta as Mason Goddard
- Gina Gershon as Amelia Decker
- Lukas Haas as Shawn Goddard
- Quavo as Anton
- Natali Yura as Link
- Noel Gugliemi as Hector
- Swen Temmel as Georgios Caras
- Demián Castro as Zade Black
- Alex Hurt as Mr. Flowers
- Danny Pardo as Abel Salzar
- Kelly Greyson as Bella
- Joel Cohen as Vernon Richter
- Daniel Louis Rivas as Chaz Antonelli
- Meadow Williams as Penelope
- Brittany Furlan as Adrianna

== Development ==
In April 2024, a sequel to Cash Out was directed by Randall Emmett under his pseudonym Ives. It was filmed in April 2023 and was shot at the Scarlet Pearl Casino Resort in D'Iberville, Mississippi and other locations across the Mississippi Gulf Coast. Kristin Davis's role in the previous film has been replaced by Gina Gershon in this one.

== Release ==
High Rollers was released digitally and in limited theaters by Saban Films on March 14, 2025. It released in the United Kingdom by 101 Films on June 16, 2025.

== Reception ==
On the review aggregator website Rotten Tomatoes, 20% of 10 critics' reviews are positive.

=== Box office ===
As of September 24, 2025, High Rollers grossed $72,805 in the United Arab Emirates.

== Sequel ==
Cash Out 3 began principal photography in Miami on March 31, 2025, before moving to the Gulf Coast on April 5 and ending on April 24. Locations included Biloxi and Ocean Springs, Mississippi. Travolta returned as Mason Goddard.
