= Randall Emmett =

American film producer (born 1971)

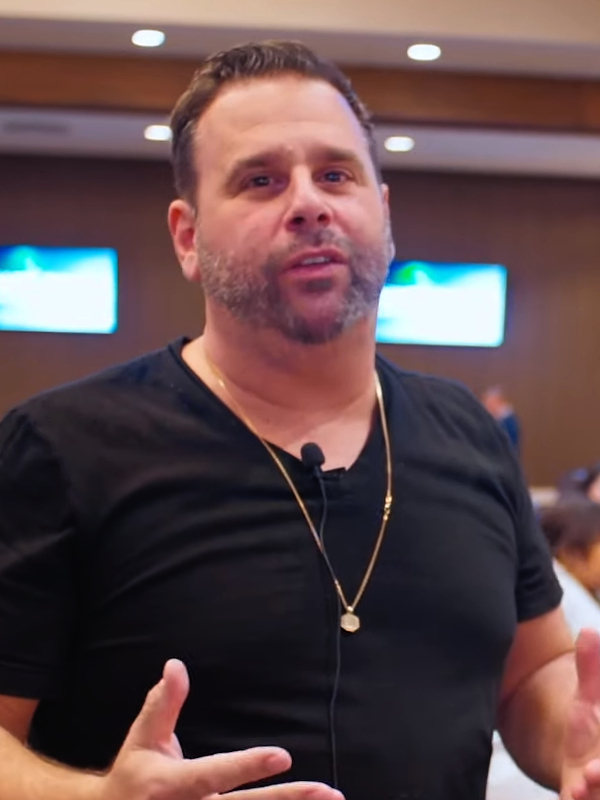
- Randall Emmett in 2020
- Born: Randall Ives Emmett; March 25, 1971 (age 55); Miami, Florida, U.S.
- Other name: Ives
- Education: School of Visual Arts
- Occupations: Film producer, director, television personality
- Years active: 1995–present
- Television: Vanderpump Rules
- Spouse: Ambyr Childers (m. 2009; div. 2017)
- Partner: Lala Kent (2015–2021)
- Children: 3

Randall Ives Emmett (born March 25, 1971) is an American film producer, director and television personality. He is the chairman and co-founder of production company Emmett/Furla Oasis Films.

Emmett is best known for pioneering the geezer teaser, a genre of low-budget action movies "teased" as starring a "geezer" (Note: Usually an older action star considered to be past their prime, notable examples of Emmett produced Geezer Teaser "Geezers" include: Bruce Willis, Nicolas Cage, Mel Gibson, Robert De Niro, Al Pacino, Sylvester Stallone and Matthew Modine.) to quickly garner international financial backing, before producing a low-quality movie with the advertised "geezer" barely appearing.

He also appeared in the eighth and ninth seasons of the Bravo reality television series Vanderpump Rules as the partner of Lala Kent.

== Early life and education ==
Born to a family in Miami, Florida, according to Emmett, a "distant cousin", through his mother, of Jerry Bruckheimer, and received a Bachelor of Fine Arts degree from the School of Visual Arts in New York City. Emmett is also a highschool alumnus of New World School of the Arts. In 1996 Emmett moved to Los Angeles and worked as an assistant at International Creative Management.

== Career ==
In 1995, Emmett began his Hollywood career as a personal assistant to Mark Wahlberg. Emmett approached Wahlberg about the possibility of him producing movies but was turned down. Later, he met George Furla, a hedge fund manager who agreed to finance his dream of being a producer, with whom he co-founded Emmett/Furla Films in 1998.

Emmett would receive a crash-course in producing by Avi Lerner and through him was introduced to Michael Oblowitz and pitched a low-budget, direct to video movie starring Steven Seagal, who had just finished acting in the highly troubled production of The Foreigner. Mostly through Lerner's vouching, Oblowitz agreed to let Emmett produce 2003's Out for a Kill starring Seagal. Out for a Kill created the "template" for a geezer teaser, as it was low quality, starred an aged Seagal and was mostly advertised and distributed in Eastern Europe. Out for a Kill making a profit caused other studios like Sony and Universal to take notice of the business strategy, and who also began heavily investing in the direct to DVD market; Emmett and Furla made three films in 2010, including Gun, before being approached in March 2011 to make films financed by Remington Chase and Stepan Martirosyan, who claimed to have made their money in Russia. However, both men had convictions related to cocaine trafficking; the SEC revealed that $62 million of the $525 million they raised for Emmett was done so fraudulently, and used for personal expenses.

In 2013, Emmett and Furla were joined by Dubai-based film financier Oasis Ventures Entertainment to become Emmet/Furla Oasis Films (EFO). Later that year, Christopher Eberts, who gave Emmett a credit on The Wicker Man, was found guilty on federal wire-fraud and money-laundering charges, while Emmett's co-producer on Speed Kills, Guy Griffithe, was found guilty of selling fictitious interests in a legal marijuana business.

In 2013, EFO was sued by Dan Bilzerian, who invested $1 million into Lone Survivor in exchange for a cameo, although he would later settle and appeared in EFO's Extraction. Lone Survivor, which had been financed by EFO's Russian money, was seen as a prestige film for EFO and Emmett, as he saw another influx of cash into his production efforts.

In 2013, EFO and Emmett were sued by Nemesis Finance for their stake in Broken City, with Emmett and Furla being accused of misrepresenting their debts to investors so they could reduce the amount of cash reserves they were required to keep on hand for residual payments to writers, actors and directors. However, the suit would be settled out of court.

Lionsgate would pressure EFO to hire Scott Mann to direct and "handle" Emmett during the production of Heist; however, Emmett would do everything in his power as producer to make Mann's life difficult, including last minute script changes and reducing filming time. However, when the reviews came in for Heist, it was noted that Mann and his directing was "battling a preposterous plot and second-tier performances." Heist had over-performed its expectations at the box office, and allowed Emmett to continue making low-quality movies.

Emmett has credits on 110 films, most of them are so bad that Vulture stated they deserve a category of their own. That category is the Geezer teaser, films notable for spending the vast majority of their budget for a day or two of work from aged action stars, and then advertising the film as starring said star in foreign markets before the film is even made, cashing in on investor funds to churn out low quality "bleak" films. Often times, the advertised "star" of a Geezer teaser is only in the film for upwards of ten minutes, being compared to the low quality Cannon Group films. Vulture also described Emmett as "Hollywood’s worst filmmaker" for, besides the poor quality of his films, his efforts to cut out union employees at every turn, from script-writers to stunt doubles, while filming wherever the tax-credit is the highest.

In 2017, Emmett and EFO was sued by Jonathan Baker, who co-produced their film Inconceivable, alleging that Emmett and Furla paid themselves $650,000 more in producer fees than had been agreed upon and failed to disclose it.

In 2019, Oasis Ventures sued Emmett and Furla over partnering with MoviePass; later that year, Boies/Schiller Film Group sued Emmett for breach of contract for the $6 million it had invested into Escape Plan.

Emmett earned a non-union producer credit for his role in financing the 2019 The Irishman, which he had hoped would increase his standing in Hollywood circles. It did not.

On June 29, 2022, the LA Times released an article accusing Emmett of offering women movie roles in exchange for sex. The article also claimed that Emmett paid a woman a $200,000 settlement for inappropriate contact, and knocked his ex-fiancée to the ground after she attempted to grab his phone.

In 2023, Emmett was the subject of the documentary The Randall Scandal: Love, Loathing, and Vanderpump, exposing allegations against him for racial discrimination and employment abuse at EFO.

Emmett began using Ives, his middle name, as a pseudonym, beginning with the film Cash Out.

=== Poker ===
Emmett has been playing poker since 2012. He has won four tournaments, which include two victories in $10,000 buy-in high roller tournaments at Aria Resort and Casino. He has one World Series of Poker cash in 2019 and two cashes on the World Poker Tour. As of February 2021, his live tournament winnings exceed $590,000.

Emmett has made regular TV poker appearances on PokerGO shows, including World Series of Poker coverage, Poker After Dark and Friday Night Poker.

== Personal life ==
In 2009, Emmett married actress Ambyr Childers, with whom he has two daughters. Emmett filed for separation from Childers in April 2015, but dismissed the petition the following year. Childers filed for divorce in January 2017. It was finalized in December 2017.

Emmett was engaged to Lauren "Lala Kent" Burningham from Vanderpump Rules. On March 15, 2021, their daughter, Ocean, was born. Kent ended their relationship in October 2021, after news broke of Emmett's cheating.

== Filmography ==
=== Producer ===
Feature film

- Eyes Beyond Seeing (1995)
- Speedway Junky (1999)
- Escape to Grizzly Mountain (2000)
- After Sex (2000)
- Ticker (2001)
- Good Advice (2001)
- Gentlemen of the Hunt (2002)
- Blind Horizon (2003)
- Unstoppable (2004) (co-producer)
- Edison (2005)
- The Tenants (2005)
- Before It Had a Name (2005)
- 16 Blocks (2006)
- The Wicker Man (2006)
- Home of the Brave (2006)
- King of California (2007)
- 88 Minutes (2007)
- Shortcut to Happiness (2007) (Associate producer)
- Borderland (2007)
- Righteous Kill (2008)
- Bad Lieutenant: Port of Call New Orleans (2009)
- Catch .44 (2011)
- Lay the Favorite (2012)
- Playback (2012)
- Alex Cross (2012)
- Broken City (2013)
- The Frozen Ground (2013)
- Escape Plan (2013)
- 2 Guns (2013)
- Lone Survivor (2013)
- The Prince (2014)
- 90 Minutes in Heaven (2015)
- Heist (2015)
- Extraction (2015)
- Precious Cargo (2016)
- Marauders (2016)
- Silence (2016)
- Aftermath (2017)
- Inconceivable (2017)
- First Kill (2017)
- Acts of Violence (2017)
- A Vigilante (2017)
- Gotti (2018)
- The Row (2018)
- Reprisal (2018)
- Backtrace (2018)
- The Irishman (2019)
- 10 Minutes Gone (2019)
- Trauma Center (2019)
- Survive the Night (2020)
- Force of Nature (2020)
- Hard Kill (2020)
- Boss Level (2021)
- American Traitor: The Trial of Axis Sally (2021)
- Midnight in the Switchgrass (2021)
- Out of Death (2021)
- Survive the Game (2021)
- Fortress (2021, also story writer)
- Fortress: Sniper's Eye (2022, also story writer)
- Hot Seat (2022)
- Wrong Place (2022)
- Wire Room (2022)
- Detective Knight: Rogue (2022)
- Savage Salvation (2022)
- Detective Knight: Redemption (2022)
- Detective Knight: Independence (2023)
- Armor (2024)
- Alarum (2025)

Direct-to-video

- Held for Ransom (2000)
- Out for a Kill (2003)
- Belly of the Beast (2003)
- Control (2004)
- Submerged (2005)
- Today You Die (2005)
- Mercenary for Justice (2006)
- The Contract (2006)
- Day of the Dead (2008)
- Private Valentine: Blonde & Dangerous (2008)
- Thick as Thieves (2009)
- Streets of Blood (2009)
- Caught in the Crossfire (2010)
- Gun (2010)
- All Things Fall Apart (2011)
- Setup (2011)
- Freelancers (2012)
- Fire with Fire (2012)
- Empire State (2013)
- Vice (2015)
- Escape Plan 2: Hades (2018)
- Backtrace (2018)
- Escape Plan: The Extractors (2019)
- Out of Death (2021)

=== Executive producer ===
Feature film

- Narc (2002)
- The Badge (2002)
- All I Want (2002)
- Half Past Dead (2002) (Co-executive producer)
- Wonderland (2003)
- A Love Song for Bobby Long (2004)
- Loverboy (2005) (Co-executive producer)
- The Amityville Horror (2005) (Co-executive producer)
- Lonely Hearts (2006)
- Shortcut to Happiness (2007) (Co-executive producer)
- White Air (2007)
- Finding Rin Tin Tin (2007)
- Rambo (2008)
- The Bleeding (2009)
- The Tomb (2009)
- Double Identity (2009)
- Once Fallen (2010)
- End of Watch (2012)
- Mississippi Grind (2015)
- Everest (2015)
- Exposed (2016)
- Amityville: The Awakening (2017)
- Speed Kills (2018)
- Mile 22 (2018)
- The War with Grandpa (2020)
- Desperation Road (2023)

Direct-to-video

- Hard Cash (2002)
- Blood Out (2011)
- Gunner (2024)
- Hellfire (2026)

Television

- Cutaway (2000) (Co-executive producer) (TV movie)
- Andrew Dice Clay: I'm Over Here Now (2000) (TV special)
- SAF3 (2013–14)
- Power (2014–20)

=== Director ===
- Midnight in the Switchgrass (2021)
- Savage Salvation (2022)

Under the pseudonym "Ives"

- Cash Out (2024)
- High Rollers (2025)
- The Gentleman Thief (2026)
- Conspiracy of Thieves (2026)
