= Geezer teaser =

Film categorization

"Geezer teaser" is a pejorative term used to describe a film—usually an action film released direct-to-video and distributed via video on demand (VOD)—for which older famous male actors ("geezers") who may be considered past their prime are billed in starring roles and prominently featured ("teased") in promotional material, only to then appear for a brief amount of time during the film itself. These actors help bring attention to films that are made on low budgets but become profitable through rentals and sales.

American production company Emmett/Furla Oasis (EFO) is considered a pioneer of the geezer teaser, especially through its co-founder Randall Emmett, with Bruce Willis starring in several films for the company from Setup (2011) until his 2022 retirement due to the onset of frontotemporal dementia; he typically only worked for one or two shooting days per film and was sometimes in the film for as little as seven minutes, such as in Hard Kill (2020). Although such films are usually panned by critics, they continue to be made, with companies such as EFO's main distributor Lionsgate calling them "consistently profitable". Other film companies such as Highland Film Group and Saban Films are known for releasing Geezer Teaser movies.

Other actors commonly associated with these films include Nicolas Cage, John Cusack, Mel Gibson, Steven Seagal, Sylvester Stallone, and John Travolta. Action films starring Liam Neeson have been described as the "prestige version" of the geezer teaser because, while Neeson has also appeared in multiple action films each year throughout the 2010s, his screen time in most of his films usually corresponds to his billing as a main character. The term came to public knowledge in a March 2021 Vulture article in which film distribution executive Adam Champ attributed it to a client.

== See also ==
- Euro War
- B movie
- Z movie
