= Swen Temmel =

Austrian–American actor and producer

- Born: August 25, 1991 (age 35); Graz, Styria, Austria
- Citizenship: Austrian, American
- Occupations: Actor, Producer
- Years active: 2006-present
- Height: 6'2
- Spouse: Vanessa Temmel
- Website: https://www.swentemmel.com/

Swen Temmel (born August 25, 1991, in Graz, Austria) is an Austrian–American actor and producer. He is best known for roles in the films After (2019), Guy Ritchie's The Covenant (2023), and Den of Thieves 2: Pantera (2025). As a producer, he earned a Daytime Emmy Award for Outstanding Digital Drama Series for the soap opera The Bay in 2020.

== Early life ==
Temmel was born in Graz, Austria. His father Charly Temmel, a restaurateur who managed Arnold Schwarzenegger's restaurant Schatzi on Main in Santa Monica, California. The family relocated to the United States in 1997. He attended Santa Monica Elementary School and graduated from Malibu High School. He became a naturalized United States citizen in 2018. He currently resides in Brentwood, Los Angeles, with his wife, Vanessa Temmel.

== Education and training ==
Temmel completed a two-year acting program at the Lee Strasberg Theatre and Film Institute in West Hollywood, CA, studied improvisation and comedic performance at The Groundlings in Hollywood, and attended a Shakespeare course at the Royal Academy of Dramatic Art (RADA) in London.

== Career ==
=== Stage ===
Temmel began his performance career on stage. He appeared in productions including The Laugh Lines, Master Harold...and the Boys and The Sunshine Boys sharing the stage with Dick Van Dyke in the latter production at the Malibu Stage Company, the musical Legally Blonde at the Marilyn Monroe Theatre.

=== Film ===
Temmel gained wider recognition in the 2019 romantic drama After, based on the novel by Anna Todd, playing the role of Jace; he also served as an executive producer on the film. His other film credits include Backtrace (2018), 10 Minutes Gone (2019), Hard Kill (2020), Force of Nature (2020), and Survive the Game (2021).

He appeared in American Traitor: The Trial of Axis Sally (2021) as attorney Billy Owen, and co-produced Aileen Wuornos: American Boogeywoman, for which he received a nomination at the 2022 Septimius Awards for Best American Actor. In 2022 he appeared in Bandit and served as an executive producer, and played Elvis Kincaid in Savage Salvation.

In 2023 he had a minor role in Guy Ritchie's The Covenant as "Team Member Joe". In 2024 he appaeared in the western Outlaw Posse and the crime-comedy The Clean Up Crew. In 2025 he played Milan Lovren and served as executive producer on Den of Thieves 2: Pantera.

=== Television ===
Temmel had a recurring role as Logan on the digital daytime drama series The Bay (2018–2020). As an executive producer of the series he received the Daytime Emmy Award for Outstanding Digital Drama Series at the 47th Daytime Emmy Awards in 2020; the series also received nominations in 2019 and 2021.

== Filmography ==
=== As film actor ===
Year	Title	Role	Notes
2006	The Doers of Coming Deeds	Hitler Youth	Short film
2007	2 Hitmen	Bobby the Bully	
2007	The Ringo Bingo Kid	Rainbow	
2007	Club Evil	Eric	Short film
2008	First Period	Alex	Short film
2011	In Time	Breitling	
2011	Turning Point	James	
2011	Bizney	Prince Charming	Short film
2014	Last Train Home	Eustis	Short film
2014	Very Vérité	Michael	Short film
2016	Big Star	Mark Ryder	Short film
2017	Spy vs. Spy	Unknown	Short film
2018	Escape	PR	Short film
2018	Backtrace	John Truby	
2019	After	Jace	Also executive producer
2019	10 Minutes Gone	Baxter	
2020	Boss Level	Cop #2	
2020	Force of Nature	Hodges	
2020	Hard Kill	Dash Hawkins	
2020	Concrete Cowboy	Security Guard	
2020	Killer Weekend	Store Clerk	
2020	Breach	Fitzgerald	
2021	American Traitor: The Trial of Axis Sally	Billy Owen	Also executive producer
2021	Midnight in the Switchgrass	Local Police Officer Gary	
2021	Symphoria	Brandon Hess	
2021	Aileen Wuornos: American Boogeywoman	Grady Miller	Also producer
2021	Survive the Game	Cal	
2022	Bandit	Hoffman	Also executive producer
2022	Savage Salvation	Elvis Kincaid	
2023	Guy Ritchie's The Covenant	Team Member Joe	
2024	Outlaw Posse	Willis	Also executive producer
2024	Cash Out	Georgios Caras	
2024	The Clean Up Crew	Chuck	Also executive producer
2025	High Rollers	Georgios Caras	
2026	Holiguards Saga — The Portal of Force	Chase	

=== As television actor ===
Year	Title	Role	Notes
2010	The Young and the Restless	Teenage Victor	1 episode
2013	Castle	Young Frank Henson	1 episode
2019–2023	The Bay	Logan	11 episodes

== Awards and nominations ==
46th Daytime Emmy Awards (2019)—Nominated Outstanding Digital Drama Series, The Bay (as executive producer)

47th Daytime Emmy Awards (2020)—Winner Outstanding Digital Drama Series, The Bay (as executive producer)

48th Daytime Emmy Awards (2021)—Nominated Outstanding Digital Drama Series, The Bay (as executive producer)

Septimius Awards (2022) — Nominated Best American Actor for American Traitor:The Trial of Axis Sally
