= 10 Minutes Gone =

2019 film by Brian A. Miller

- Theatrical release poster
- Directed by: Brian A. Miller
- Written by: Kelvin Mao; Jeff Jingle
- Produced by: Randall Emmett; George Furla; Lydia Hull; Shaun Sanghani; Mark Stewart
- Starring: Bruce Willis; Michael Chiklis
- Cinematography: Peter A. Holland
- Edited by: Bob Mori; Michael Trent
- Music by: Josh Atchley
- Production companies: EFO Films; MoviePass Films; Diamond Film Productions
- Distributed by: Lionsgate Films (United States); Highland Film Group (International)
- Release date: September 27, 2019 (United States)
- Running time: 89 minutes
- Countries: United States; Canada
- Language: English
- Box office: $332,731

10 Minutes Gone is a 2019 crime thriller action film directed by Brian A. Miller. The film stars Bruce Willis and Michael Chiklis, and was released on September 27, 2019.

== Plot ==
Expert bank robber Frank Sullivan (Michael Chiklis) never had a job go wrong until his brother is killed during a heist. Knocked unconscious, Frank wakes up in a dirty alley without memory of how the robbery went awry or who shot his brother. To Frank's boss, violent crime lord Rex (Bruce Willis), none of that matters, but he just wants the loot, which Frank does not have. Short on time and information, Frank must figure out which member of their crew betrayed them, avoid Rex's contract killer closing in on him, and locate a mysterious briefcase to save his own skin and avenge his brother's death.

== Cast ==
- Michael Chiklis as Frank Sullivan
- Bruce Willis as Rex
- Meadow Williams as Claire
- Kyle Schmid as Griffin O'Brien
- Texas Battle as Richard
- Lydia Hull as Ivory
- Swen Temmel as Baxter
- John Hickman at Mitch
- Sergio Rizzuto as Marshall
- Geoff Reeves as Dr. White
- Tyler Jon Olson as Joe Sullivan

== Production ==
The film was shot in Cincinnati in September 2018.

The film was produced by Emmett/Furla/Oasis Films and MoviePass Films, with Randall Emmett, George Furla, Lydia Hull, Shaun Sanghani and Mark Stewart among its producers.

== Box office ==
As of August 27, 2022, 10 Minutes Gone grossed $332,731 in the United Arab Emirates, Portugal, Mexico, and Colombia.

== Reception ==
On the review aggregator website Rotten Tomatoes, 0% of 9 critics' reviews are positive, with an average rating of 2/10. Metacritic, which uses a weighted average, assigned the film a score of 13 out of 100, based on 4 critics, indicating "overwhelming dislike".

Derek Smith of Slant Magazine awarded the film half a star out of four.
