= Savage Salvation =

- Theatrical release poster
- Directed by: Randall Emmett
- Written by: Adam Taylor Barker; Chris Sivertson
- Produced by: Randall Emmett; George Furla; Tim Sullivan; Chad A. Verdi; Shaun Sanghani; Joel Cohen
- Starring: Jack Huston; Robert De Niro; John Malkovich
- Cinematography: Eric Koertz
- Edited by: Eric Friedenberg
- Music by: Philip Klein
- Production companies: Emmett Furla Oasis Films; Verdi Productions; SSS Entertainment
- Distributed by: The Avenue Entertainment
- Release date: December 2, 2022
- Running time: 101 minutes
- Country: United States
- Language: English
- Box office: $132,152

Savage Salvation is a 2022 American action thriller film directed by Randall Emmett and starring Jack Huston, Robert De Niro and John Malkovich.

== Plot ==
After losing his fiancee to a heroin overdose, a rehabilitated addict seeks revenge against the drug cartel while hot on his heels is a sympathetic sheriff.

== Cast ==
- Jack Huston as Shelby John
- Robert De Niro as Sheriff Mike Church
- John Malkovich as Peter
- Willa Fitzgerald as Ruby Red
- Quavo as Coyote
- Meadow Williams as Detective Zeppelin
- Dale Dickey as Greta
- Swen Temmel as Elvis Kincaid
- Noel Gugliemi as Silas
- Jon Orsini as Skeeter
- Clay Wilcox as Darius
- Winter Ave Zoli as Darlene

== Production ==
On September 8, 2020, it was announced that De Niro, Malkovich and Machine Gun Kelly were cast in the film, then titled Wash Me in the River. On October 19, 2020, it was announced that Taylor Kitsch had replaced Machine Gun Kelly after the latter dropped out due to scheduling conflicts. On November 13, 2020, it was announced that Jack Huston had replaced Kitsch. Production on the film began in November 2020. Malkovich filmed his scenes in December 2020. Filming officially wrapped in January 2021, and the following month, it was announced that Quavo and Willa Fitzgerald would star in the film.

== Release ==
In March 2021, The Avenue Entertainment acquired North American distribution rights to the film. It was retitled Savage Salvation, and released on December 2, 2022.

=== Box office ===
As of May 7, 2024, Savage Salvation grossed $132,152 in Portugal, the Netherlands, South Korea, and Spain, plus $749,679 in home video sales.
