= The Gentleman Thief (film) =

Film by Ives (Randall Emmett)

- Release poster
- Directed by: Ives
- Written by: Chris Sivertson
- Produced by: Joel Cohen; Randall Emmett; Sean Stone
- Starring: John Travolta; Lukas Haas; Rebecca De Mornay; Danny Pardo; Sam Asghari; Quavo; DJ Khaled
- Cinematography: Alejandro Lalinde
- Edited by: Marc Fusco
- Music by: Yagmur Kaplan
- Production companies: Convergence Entertainment Group; Limitless Films; Highland Film Group
- Distributed by: Vertical
- Release date: July 28, 2026
- Running time: 97 minutes
- Country: United States
- Language: English

The Gentleman Thief is a 2026 American action thriller film directed by Ives, written by Chris Sivertson, and starring John Travolta, Lukas Haas, Rebecca De Mornay, Danny Pardo, Sam Asghari, Quavo, and DJ Khaled. It is a sequel to High Rollers (2025).

The film was released on July 28, 2026.

== Cast ==
- John Travolta as Mason Goddard
- Lukas Haas as Shawn Goddard
- Rebecca De Mornay as Odessa
- Sam Asghari as Victor
- Natali Yura as Link
- Quavo as Anton
- DJ Khaled as Juan
- Danny Pardo as Abel Salzar

== Production ==
A third Cash Out film, starring John Travolta as Mason Goddard, began principal photography in Miami, Florida on March 31, 2025. Filming also occurred in Biloxi and Ocean Springs, Mississippi, and other locations along the Gulf Coast, on April 5, before wrapping on April 24. By September 2025, the film was directed by Randall Emmett under his pseudonym Ives. In July 2026, it was revealed that Vertical had acquired the distribution rights to the film.

== Release ==
The Gentleman Thief was released digitally on July 28, 2026, followed by a limited theatrical release on July 31.
