= Empire State (2013 film) =

2013 action film

- DVD cover
- Directed by: Dito Montiel
- Written by: Adam Mazer
- Produced by: Mark Stewart; Randall Emmett
- Starring: Liam Hemsworth; Emma Roberts; Dwayne Johnson
- Cinematography: Dana Gonzales
- Edited by: Jake Pushinsky
- Music by: David Wittman
- Production companies: Grindstone Entertainment Group; EFF; Kind Hearts Entertainment
- Distributed by: Lionsgate
- Release date: March 19, 2013; (cinemas)
- Running time: 94 minutes
- Country: United States
- Language: English
- Box office: $187,500

Empire State is a 2013 American crime drama film centered on two childhood friends who rob an armored car repository and the NYPD officer who stands in their way. Directed by Dito Montiel and starring Liam Hemsworth, Emma Roberts and Dwayne Johnson.

The film was released straight to DVD and Blu-ray on September 3, 2013. It is based on the true story of the 1983 Sentry Armored Car Courier Company theft.

== Plot ==
Chris Potamitis lives with his parents and younger sister in Astoria, Queens, New York in the early 1980s. His immigrant father is fired from his job after 10 years of cleaning a shady Greek social club. Chris fails to get into the police academy because of a previous marijuana conviction.

Chris gets a low-paying job as a security guard with the Empire Armored Car Company, where security is extremely poor, morale is equally bad, and no reliable records are kept of money collected or stored. His partner is killed during a robbery, but the company gives the dead man's family only $5,000 in compensation rather than the $50,000 they are entitled to. After Chris is demoted to the position of night watchman, he steals one of the money bags he is guarding and gives some of the cash to his partner's widow.

Chris makes the mistake of showing the money to his loud-mouthed best friend Eddie and telling him about the company's worse-than-lax security. He then shares this information with Spiro, a gangster he wants to impress. Spiro subsequently stages a robbery that is foiled by James Ransome, a veteran detective in the New York Police Department who has been tipped off. A gun battle ensues in which two of the robbers are killed.

Then, on December 12, 1982, Eddie breaks into the company through the roof in the middle of the night, and he hectors a weak-willed Chris into opening the vault. Eddie knocks out Chris and steals $11 million in cash, the single largest cash robbery in U.S. history, exceeding the $5.8 million Lufthansa heist in December 1978. Eddie gives $3 million of the loot to Chris.

The FBI goes after the Five Families of organized crime, but Ransome decides that Chris, Eddie, and their associates need to be investigated. Eddie and his gangster friend Michael attempt to exchange $8 million of the loot for Colombian drugs, but the deal goes bad and Michael and the Colombians shoot it out. Meanwhile, Spiro demands that Chris turn over the money to him.

Ransome arrests Eddie and asks where Chris and the rest of the money are, but he says nothing and is released. Chris tells his friend Nancy that the money is hidden in a statue that he and Eddie had given to his mother. Eddie confronts Chris with a gun and demands that he hand over the money, but Chris's father shoots and wounds him just before the police arrive and arrest all three men. Chris and Eddie are released from federal prison on October 10, 1991, but the money is never recovered.

== Cast ==
- Liam Hemsworth as Chris Potamitis
- Dwayne Johnson as Detective James Ransome
- Michael Angarano as Eddie
- Emma Roberts as Nancy Michaelides
- Nikki Reed as Lizzette
- Paul Ben-Victor as Tommy Potamitis
- Jerry Ferrara as Jimmy "The Greek"
- Greg Vrotsos as Mike Dimitriu
- Michael Rispoli as Tony Cappolitti
- Wayne Pére as Williams
- Craig Leydecker as Chilewski
- Shenae Grimes as Eleni
- Sharon Angela as Dina Potamitis
- Chris Diamantopoulos as Spiro Stavrakis
- Lucky Johnson as Phil Johnson
- James Ransone as Agent Nugent
- Gia Mantegna as Vicky Potamitis

== Production ==
Shooting took place in New Orleans in 2012.

== Soundtrack ==
The soundtrack to Empire State was released on September 3, 2013.

== Release ==
Empire State premiered at the Gasparilla International Film Festival on March 19, 2013. It grossed $187,500 in Croatia, Mexico, and Thailand. Lionsgate Home Entertainment released the film on DVD and Blu-ray in the US on September 3, 2013, and it grossed $4 million.

== Reception ==
John Ferguson of the Radio Times rated it 2/5 stars and wrote that the film features "committed performances" but can not decide whether it is a gritty drama or flashy heist film.
