= Control (2004 film) =

- Directed by: Tim Hunter
- Written by: Todd Slavkin; Darren Swimmer
- Produced by: Lori Forte; John C. Donkin; Randall Emmett
- Starring: Ray Liotta; Willem Dafoe; Michelle Rodriguez; Stephen Rea; Polly Walker; Kathleen Robertson
- Cinematography: Denis Lenoir
- Edited by: Sunny Hodge
- Music by: Louis Febre
- Production companies: Millennium Films; Emmett/Furla Films; VIP Media Group
- Distributed by: Millennium Entertainment
- Release date: 7 December 2004
- Running time: 105 minutes
- Country: United States
- Language: English
- Budget: $6,800,000

Control is a 2004 American direct-to-video film directed by Tim Hunter, and starring Ray Liotta, Willem Dafoe, and Michelle Rodriguez. It was produced by a United States production company and filmed in Bulgaria. Originally given a proposed theatrical release in the United States by Lionsgate, the film was instead shelved until it was eventually given a release on home video by Millennium Entertainment.

== Plot ==
Lee Ray Oliver is a death row inmate who is given a lethal injection before a room of witnesses. He awakes in the morgue to find that he had only been administered saline and anaesthetic. A neuropharmacologist, Dr. Copeland, tells him that he has a choice: either agree to be a human subject for an experimental drug trial with potentially serious or fatal side effects, or he will receive a truly lethal injection.

Oliver opts for the drug trial, where he is administered a "calming" medicine on a daily basis and tested extensively to see if his sociopathic tendencies decrease. Twice, Oliver fakes being relaxed to lull the guards and scientists into a false sense of ease, whereupon he attempts an escape. First he asks for a smoke, second he talks to Dr. Copeland.

Over time, the medicine and psychological counseling do appear to lower his sociopathology, as measured physiologically and emotionally, and Oliver undergoes "phase two" of the procedure, where he is reintroduced into society, with a false identity and a changed appearance (tattoos and scars removed, dress and hairstyle change).

Oliver is under constant surveillance, but manages to escape supervision to attempt to befriend and assist a helpless bystander who was victimized during one of Oliver's past crimes. Oliver feels deep remorse now for shooting the man, which left him mentally disabled. Because the man no longer recognizes Oliver, he cheerfully accepts the friendly offerings. However, his brother, who is the man's caretaker, recognizes Oliver and seeks revenge. Simultaneously, Oliver is also being sought by the Russian mafia, who seek revenge upon Oliver for killing the nephew of a mafia boss.

Though Oliver makes progress in establishing a new life, getting a job, keeping his anger and violence in check, and developing a relationship with a female co-worker (Teresa), his past comes to haunt him, and he is captured by the victim's brother, who kills one of Oliver's pharmaceutical supervisors while kidnapping Oliver. This ultimately leads to a hit squad being sent out to put Oliver down. The doctor believes that Oliver was making progress and did not kill the man, so secretly tries to help him, entangling himself in the situation. They eventually learn that Oliver's progress was not due to the medicine after all, as he was in a control group which received a placebo, but instead was due to the counseling and Oliver's willingness to change. They try to flee the state, but are caught by the hit squad, which kills Oliver. Then the cops arrive and stop the squad from killing Dr. Copeland.

The film ends with Dr. Copeland as a counselor in a youth center.

== Cast ==
- Ray Liotta as Lee Ray Oliver
- Willem Dafoe as Dr. Michael Copeland
- Michelle Rodriguez as Teresa
- Stephen Rea as Dr. Arlo Penner
- Polly Walker as Barbara Copeland
- Kathleen Robertson as Eden Ross
- Tim DeKay as Bill Caputo
- Mark Pickard as Gary Caputo
- Glenn Wrage as Gibson
- Nick Brimble as Dimi Vertov
- Raicho Vasilev as Vlas

== Awards ==
Nominated for a Golden Reel Award.
