= All I Want (film) =

2002 comedy film by Jeffrey Porter

- DVD cover
- Directed by: Jeffrey Porter
- Written by: Charles Kephart
- Produced by: Mike Elliott; Randall Emmett; George Furla; Michele Wiesler; Holly Wiersma
- Starring: Elijah Wood; Franka Potente; Mandy Moore
- Cinematography: Blake Evans
- Edited by: David Richardson
- Music by: Andrew Gross
- Production company: Emmett/Furla Films
- Distributed by: Try Seventeen Productions
- Release dates: September 10, 2002 (Toronto International Film Festival); January 12, 2003 (Palm Springs International Film Festival)
- Running time: 96 minutes
- Countries: Canada; United States
- Language: English

All I Want (also known as Try Seventeen) is a 2002 coming-of-age comedy-drama film directed by Jeffrey Porter and written by Charles Kephart. It stars Elijah Wood, Franka Potente and Mandy Moore. The film premiered at the Toronto International Film Festival on September 10, 2002 and Palm Springs International Film Festival on January 12, 2003.

== Premise ==
After 17-year-old misfit Jones Dillon drops out of college on his first day, he moves into an old apartment building where he soon becomes entangled in the lives of his kooky new neighbors, including a temperamental photographer and a self-absorbed aspiring actress. When he's not busy flirting with the ladies or learning to live on his own, would-be writer Jones divides his time between fending off queries from his alcoholic mother, penning letters to an absentee father, and indulging in an overactive fantasy life. An auto accident forces a reality check, however, nudging Jones to grow up and decide what he really wants.

== Cast ==
- Elijah Wood as Jones Dillon
- Franka Potente as Jane
- Mandy Moore as Lisa
- Elizabeth Perkins as Blanche Dillon
- Deborah Harry as Ma
- Chris William Martin as Steve
- Aaron Pearl as Brad

== Production ==
This is the second film in which Elizabeth Perkins plays Elijah Wood's mother, the first being Avalon, directed by Barry Levinson.

== Reception ==
On the review aggregator website Rotten Tomatoes, 0% of 7 critics' reviews are positive, with an average rating of 3.5/10.
