= Planes: Fire & Rescue =

2014 American DisneyToon film

- Theatrical release poster
- Directed by: Bobs Gannaway
- Written by: Bobs Gannaway; Jeffrey M. Howard
- Produced by: Ferrell Barron
- Starring: Dane Cook; Ed Harris; Julie Bowen; Wes Studi; Brad Garrett; Teri Hatcher; Stacy Keach; Danny Mann; Regina King; Dale Dye
- Edited by: Dan Molina
- Music by: Mark Mancina
- Production company: Disneytoon Studios
- Distributed by: Walt Disney Studios; Motion Pictures (Note: Distributed under the Walt Disney Pictures banner.)
- Release dates: July 15, 2014 (El Capitan Theatre); July 18, 2014 (United States)
- Running time: 84 minutes
- Country: United States
- Language: English
- Budget: $50 million
- Box office: $147 million

Planes: Fire & Rescue is a 2014 American animated adventure comedy film produced by Disneytoon Studios and released by Walt Disney Pictures. Directed by Bobs Gannaway, written by Gannaway and Jeffrey M. Howard, and produced by Ferrell Barron, it is a sequel to Planes (2013), itself a spin-off of Pixar's Cars franchise. Dane Cook, Stacy Keach, Brad Garrett, Teri Hatcher, Danny Mann, and Cedric the Entertainer reprised their roles with new additions to the cast including Hal Holbrook, Julie Bowen, Ed Harris, Regina King, Wes Studi, Patrick Warburton, and Dale Dye. In the film, Dusty Crophopper (Cook) is assigned to become a wildland firefighting plane in Piston Peak National Park after he learns that his engine's gearbox is damaged.

Production began for six months after the start of the previous film. Gannaway intended to give each film its own different genre, Planes: Fire & Rescue being an "action-disaster film". The filmmakers researched the world of air-attack teams and smokejumpers by working with the California Department of Forestry and Fire Protection (CALFire), and sent a crew to the US Forest Service's annual training exercises for smokejumpers. Mark Mancina composed the musical score again, while Prana Studios returned to provided work on visual effects, animation and compositing.

Planes: Fire & Rescue premiered at the El Capitan Theatre in Los Angeles on July 15, 2014, and was theatrically released on July 18, 2014, in Disney Digital 3D, RealD 3D and D-BOX formats. The film received mixed reviews from critics, with many calling it an improvement over its predecessor, and grossed $147 million worldwide on a $50 million budget.

== Plot ==
Since winning the Wings Around the Globe Rally, (Note: As depicted in Planes (2013)) Dusty Crophopper has a successful career as an air racer, but his engine's gearbox becomes damaged due to him constantly overstressing his engine. His gearbox model has been out of production for years, forcing Dusty's mechanic Dottie to fit a warning light to prevent further damage. Disappointed, Dusty goes on a defiant flight, but in doing so, clips a transmission tower and is forced to make an unstable landing back at Propwash Junction's airport, colliding with a pole and inadvertently causing a fire.

Mayday, the town's only fire truck, fails to extinguish the fire due to poorly maintained equipment, forcing the residents to topple the nearby water tower out of desperation. The accident leads to government inspectors shutting down the airport for inadequate firefighting protocols until Mayday is refurbished, and another firefighter is added. Dusty, feeling remorseful, offers to become a firefighter to get the airport reopened, so he travels to Piston Peak National Park, where he meets a forest fire and smokejumper crew under the command of a helicopter named Blade Ranger, and is converted into an air tanker by Maru, the team's mechanic. Blade is initially unimpressed by the small newcomer, as Dusty's training proves to be difficult due to his damaged gearbox, which he initially does not reveal. Dusty learns that Blade was a former actor who played a police helicopter on the TV series CHoPs but left for unknown reasons. The next day, Dusty is devastated by a call from his friends back at Propwash Junction, revealing that all attempts at finding a replacement gearbox have failed, effectively ending his racing career.

Lightning from thunderstorms over a forest near Piston Peak starts several spot fires which unite into a larger, serious fire. The team seems to have extinguished it; but a day later, during the grand reopening of the park's lodge, visiting VIPs flew too low and restarted the fire, turning it into a much larger one and forcing the entire park to evacuate. Meanwhile, a forlorn Dusty struggles to contain the fire, much to Blade’s frustration, and things escalate when Dusty tries to refill his water tank in a dangerous river, only to be swept through the rapids with Blade racing to pull him out. They eventually reach land, where Dusty admits his gearbox is damaged, and Blade urges him not to give up. Taking shelter in an abandoned mine as the fire passes, Blade suffers severe damage while shielding Dusty from the intense heat, leading to his evacuation by airlift. While Blade recovers at the base, Windlifter takes charge and Dusty learns from Maru that Blade’s co-star and best friend, Nick “Loopin’” Lopez from CHoPs, died in a stunt gone wrong that Blade couldn’t prevent, inspiring him to become a firefighter to save lives for real.

Cad Spinner, the park superintendent, diverts the park's entire water supply to the roof sprinklers to prevent the lodge from burning. This would cost his job as the crew were unable to produce fire retardant and as a result, is forced to use their remaining supply to help guests evacuate after the fire initially blocked the park's only exit. Dusty is then alerted that two elderly campers, Harvey and Winnie, who Dusty and his crew had met earlier, are trapped on a burning bridge at the other side of the park. He races to the bridge and is forced to push his engine to maximum power while scaling up a waterfall to refill his tank. Blade shows up to assist Dusty, who successfully extinguishes the bridge, allowing the campers to escape; only for Dusty's overstressed engine to catastrophically fail immediately after, causing him to crash into the forest.

Dusty is airlifted back to base and recovers five days later. Learning that in addition to fully repairing him, Maru successfully refurbished Dusty's gearbox, allowing him to race again. When the new superintendent, Jammer arrives, Blade, impressed at Dusty's skills and heroism, certifies him as a firefighter. Propwash Junction airport is reopened with Mayday being fully refurbished and Dusty assuming duty as a firefighter. The town celebrates with an aerial show with his new colleagues from Piston Peak.

In the mid-credits scene, Cad is seen working as a Death Valley National Park ranger.

== Voice cast ==
- Dane Cook as Dusty Crophopper, a crop duster plane in the town of Propwash Junction who used to be a successful racer ever since winning the Wings Around the Globe Rally, but after learning that his engine's gearbox is damaged, he can no longer race and ultimately becomes a firefighter. He was inspired by the Air Tractor AT-502, Cessna 188, and the PZL-Mielec M-18 Dromader.
- Ed Harris as Blade Ranger, a veteran fire-and-rescue helicopter. He used to play a police helicopter in CHoPs with his co-star Nick "Loop'n" Lopez but became a firefighter when Nick died during a stunt gone wrong on set. He is inspired by the AgustaWestland AW109, AgustaWestland AW139 and Bell 429 GlobalRanger.
- Julie Bowen as Lil' Dipper, a Super Scooper who has a massive crush on Dusty. She is based on the Grumman G-21 Goose and CL-415 SuperScooper
- Curtis Armstrong as Maru, a forklift mechanic at the Piston Peak Air Attack base
- John Michael Higgins as Cad Spinner, a self-absorbed luxury sport utility vehicle whose sole concern was the grand reopening and protection of the park's luxurious lodge
- Hal Holbrook as Mayday, an old fire and rescue truck from Propwash Junction
- Wes Studi as Windlifter, a Sikorsky S-64 Skycrane heavy-lift helicopter who is Blade's second-in-command
- Brad Garrett as Chug, a fuel truck at Propwash Junction and Dusty's friend
- Teri Hatcher as Dottie, a forklift who is also Propwash Junction's mechanic
- Stacy Keach as Skipper Riley, a Chance-Vought F4U Corsair and Dusty's mentor
- Cedric the Entertainer as Leadbottom, a biplane at Propwash Junction
- Danny Mann as Sparky, a forklift who takes care of Skipper
- Barry Corbin as Ol' Jammer, a tour bus based on the White Model 706
- Regina King as Dynamite, the leader of The Smokejumpers, a team of ground vehicles who parachute into fire sites
- Jerry Stiller as Harvey, an RV and Winnie's husband
- Anne Meara as Winnie, an RV and Harvey's wife. This would be Meara's final role before her death in 2015.
- Fred Willard as Secretary of the Interior, a green four-wheel-drive with a roof rack
- Dale Dye as Cabbie, a Fairchild C-119 Flying Boxcar retired from military service
- Matt L. Jones as Drip, a smokejumper equipped with a skid-steer claw to clear fallen trees and brush
- Bryan Callen as Avalanche, a smokejumper equipped with a bulldozer
- Corri English as Pinecone, a smokejumper equipped with a rake tool to clear brush and debris
- Danny Pardo as Blackout, a smokejumper equipped with a circular saw
- Erik Estrada as Nick "Loopin" Lopez, a helicopter police officer who was the co-star of CHoPs who was killed before Blade became a firefighter
- Kevin Michael Richardson as Ryker, a transportation management safety truck with a roof-mounted watercannon for firefighting
- Patrick Warburton as Pulaski, a yellow structural firefighting fire truck with a roof-mounted watercannon for firefighting.
  - Pulaski's namesake, Ed Pulaski, was known for his heroism in saving most of his crew during the Great Fire of 1910 by sheltering in an abandoned mine. He also invented the firefighting axes/adze used by wildfire firefighters that bears his name.
- Brad Paisley as Bubba, a pickup truck
- Kari Wahlgren as Patch
- René Auberjonois as André
- Steve Schirripa as Steve
- Brent Musburger as Brent Mustangburger, a Ford Mustang
- John Ratzenberger as Brodi

== Production ==
According to director/co-writer Roberts "Bobs" Gannaway, "The first film [directed by Klay Hall] was a race film. I wanted to look at a different genre, in this case, an action-disaster film." Production on Planes: Fire & Rescue began six months after the start of the previous film. "We've been working on this film for nearly four years." The filmmakers researched the world of air-attack teams and smokejumpers by working with the California Department of Forestry and Fire Protection, and sent a crew to the US Forest Services' annual training exercises for smokejumpers. Gannaway explained, "We actually hooked cameras onto their helmets and had them drop out of the airplane so we could catch it on film." Nearly a year of research was done before the filmmakers started work on the story. The idea of Dusty becoming a fire and rescue plane was based on reality. Gannaway stated that during their research they discovered that in 1955 cropdusters were among the first planes to be used in aerial fire-fighting, "There was a group of cropdusters who reworked their planes so they could drop water." Gannaway also noted that in the first film "Dusty is doing things to his engine that should not be done to it—he is stressing the engine out and causing severe damage. It's great that the first movie teed this up without intending to. We just built on it, and the results were remarkable." Producer Ferrell Barron stated "I think we've all experienced some kind of loss at some point in our lives—an end of an era, a lost love, a failed career. We've all had to recalibrate. In Planes: Fire & Rescue, Dusty can't go back to being a crop duster, he left that behind. He has to move forward." Prana Studios provided work on visual effects, animation and compositing.

A pre-release screening of the film was conducted at the 2014 National Native Media Conference, where screenwriter Jeffrey M. Howard and art director Toby Wilson joined actor Wes Studi in Q & A to discuss the Native American themes in the film. They noted that the character of Windlifter, and the folkloric story he tells of how Coyote was renewed by fire, was developed in consultation with Dr. Paul Apodaca, an expert on Native American myths and folklore.

== Release ==
Planes: Fire & Rescue was released on July 18, 2014. The second official trailer for the film was released on April 8, 2014. The film's premiere was held at the El Capitan Theatre in Los Angeles on July 15, 2014.

=== Home media ===
Planes: Fire & Rescue was released by Walt Disney Studios Home Entertainment on DVD and Blu-ray on November 4, 2014. Blu-ray bonus features include the exclusive six-minute animated short film Vitaminamulch: Air Spectacular, directed by Roberts Gannaway, in which Dusty and Chug participate in an air show disguised as absent stunt planes Air Devil Jones and Vandenomium. Additional material includes a mockumentary called Welcome to Piston Peak!, a CHoPs TV promo, a featurette called Air Attack: Firefighters From The Sky; a behind-the-scenes look at real smokejumpers and firefighters plus making of the film with director Roberts Gannaway and producer Ferrell Barron, a music video of "Still I Fly" by Spencer Lee, two deleted scenes with filmmaker intros, and two animated shorts introducing Dipper and the Smokejumpers.

As of November 30, 2014, it has sold 639,436 DVD units and 478,129 Blu-ray units, totaling $20,142,246. It was ranked number 7 in the United States Combined DVD and Blu-ray Sales Chart.

== Reception ==
=== Critical response ===
On the critical response aggregation website Rotten Tomatoes, the film holds a rating of 44% based on 93 reviews, with an average rating of 5.2/10. The site's consensus reads: "Although it's too flat and formulaic to measure up against the best family-friendly fare, Planes: Fire and Rescue is a passable diversion for much younger viewers". On Metacritic, the film has a score of 48 out of 100, based on 29 critics, indicating "mixed or average reviews". Audiences polled by CinemaScore gave the film an average grade of "A" on an A+ to F scale, higher than its predecessor's "A–" grade.

Todd McCarthy of The Hollywood Reporter gave the film a mixed review, saying "Beautiful to look at, this is nothing more than a Little Engine That Could story refitted to accommodate aerial action and therefore unlikely to engage the active interest of anyone above the age of about 8, or 10 at the most." Justin Chang of Variety gave the film a positive review, saying "There are honestly stirring moments to be found in the movie's heartfelt tribute to the virtues of teamwork, courage and sacrifice, and in its soaring 3D visuals." Stephen Whitty of the Newark Star-Ledger gave the film two and a half stars out of four, saying "There are enough silly jokes and simple excitement here ... to keep the youngest ones interested, and a few mild puns to occasionally make the adults smile." Alan Scherstuhl of The Village Voice gave the film a negative review, saying "There's a fire. And a rescue. And lots of static, TV-quality scenes that drably cut from one car or plane to another as they sit in garages and discuss the importance of believing in yourself." Soren Anderson of The Seattle Times gave the film two and a half stars out of four, saying "Disney's Planes: Fire & Rescue isn't half bad. Kids should enjoy it and their parents won't be bored." Sara Stewart of the New York Post gave the film two out of four stars, saying "It's generic stuff, unless you're a kid who's really into playing with toy planes and trains and cars." Stephan Lee of Entertainment Weekly gave the film a B, saying "Canny references to '70s television and some genuinely funny moments will give grown-ups enough fuel to cross the finish line." A.A. Dowd of The A.V. Club gave the film a C−, saying "It's nice to look at, easy to watch, and impossible to remember for the length of a car-ride home."

Joe Williams of the St. Louis Post-Dispatch gave the film two and a half stars out of four, saying "Without the kindling of character development, Planes: Fire and Rescue is no smoldering success, but if Disney's flight plan is to share Pixar's airspace, it's getting warmer." Peter Hartlaub of the San Francisco Chronicle gave the film two out of four stars, saying "It's not a poor movie. But it's definitely a better movie for the kids." Claudia Puig of USA Today gave the film two out of four stars, saying "With the lackluster quality of its characters - aircraft, a smattering of trucks, RVs and motorcycles - the movie makes Pixar's Cars and its sequel look like masterpieces." Colin Covert of the Star Tribune gave the film three out of four stars, saying "There are a scattering of inside gags, asides and blink-and-you-missed-it details for the parents. The film's focus, though, is pleasing the milk-and-cookies crowd." Mark Feeney of The Boston Globe gave the film two and a half stars out of four, saying "Most DisneyToons releases are direct-to-video. That lowly status shows here in the pokey storytelling, dreadful score, and generally tired comedy." Kenneth Turan of the Los Angeles Times gave the film a positive review, saying "What this Disney feature lacks in the title department it makes up for with fluid visuals and fast-moving action of the, yes, firefighting variety." Linda Barnard of the Toronto Star gave the film two and a half stars out of four, saying "For the most part, Planes: Fire & Rescue is more about chuckles than big guffaws, coupled with thrilling 3-D flight and firefighting action scenes and lessons about friendship, respect and loyalty." Ben Kenigsberg of The New York Times gave the film a mixed review, saying "In 3-D, the firefighting scenes are visually striking - with plumes of smoke and chemical dust - though the backgrounds, like other aspects of the film, lack dimension."

Bill Zwecker of the Chicago Sun-Times gave the film three out of four stars, saying "Planes: Fire & Rescue is a good improvement over Planes, which Disney released last year. The story is stronger, there are some wonderful additions to the voice talent and the 3D cinematography is well-utilized." James Rocchi of TheWrap gave the film three out of four stars, saying "As it is in the merchandising aisle, so it is on the big screen: Planes: Fire and Rescue is precisely long, competent, and entertaining enough to be sold, and sold well." David Hiltbrand of The Philadelphia Inquirer gave the film one and a half stars out of four, saying "The animation in Planes: Fire & Rescue is considerably better, the landscapes grander, and the 3-D flight and firefighting scenes more exciting. But you get the same lame puns wedged into a succession of situations, rather than a story." Jordan Hoffman of the New York Daily News gave the film two out of five stars, saying "The meek action plays to the under-10 crowd, but the groaner puns will play only to masochists. Meanwhile, the 3-D ticket upcharge here is a big ripoff - the extra dimension is unnecessary." Lisa Kennedy of The Denver Post gave the film a positive review, saying "Vivid and folksy, Fire & Rescue nicely exceeds expectations dampened by last summer's stalled-out Planes." Catherine Bray of Time Out gave the film one out of five stars, saying "Displaying a weird lack of memorable or endearing characters, this animated effort feels more like a direct-to-video job from the 1990s than a fully fledged John Lasseter–exec-produced theatrical release."

=== Box office ===
Planes: Fire & Rescue grossed $59.2 million in North America, and $92.1 million in other countries, for a worldwide total of $151.1 million. In North America, the film earned $6.29 million on its opening day, and opened to number three in its first weekend, with $17.5 million, behind Dawn of the Planet of the Apes and The Purge: Anarchy. In its second weekend, the film dropped to number five, grossing an additional $9.5 million. In its third weekend, the film dropped to number six, grossing $6 million. In its fourth weekend, the film dropped to number ten, grossing $2.5 million.

== Soundtrack ==
Planes: Fire & Rescue

Soundtrack album by Mark Mancina
- Released: July 15, 2014
- Recorded: 2014
- Genres: Film score, Country, Rock
- Length: 56:37
- Label: Walt Disney

Mark Mancina film scores chronology
Planes (2013)	Planes: Fire & Rescue (2014)	Moana (2016)

Mark Mancina, who composed the music for the first film, returned for the sequel. In addition, Brad Paisley wrote and performed a song for the film titled "All In". Paisley also performed a song titled "Runway Romance", co-written by Bobs Gannaway and Danny Jacob. Spencer Lee performed an original song titled "Still I Fly". The soundtrack album was released on July 15, 2014.

Track listing

All music is composed by Mark Mancina, except as noted.

No.	Title	Length
1.	"Still I Fly" (performed by Spencer Lee)	3:57
2.	"Runway Romance" (performed by Brad Paisley)	2:44
3.	"All In" (performed by Brad Paisley)	3:45
4.	"Planes: Fire & Rescue – Main Title"	2:26
5.	"Propwash"	1:56
6.	"Out of Production"	1:09
7.	"Dusty Crash Lands"	0:57
8.	"Fire!"	1:29
9.	"An All New Mayday"	1:04
10.	"Sad Mayday"	2:00
11.	"Pontoons"	0:45
12.	"A Special Kind of Plane"	0:25
13.	"Training Dusty"	2:20
14.	"We Got the Gear Box"	0:37
15.	"Cad"	1:24
16.	"Blazin' Blade Mystery"	0:22
17.	"Mystery of Blaze-Lightning"	1:22
18.	"Lightning Storm Fire"	1:46
19.	"(It's) Hip to Be Cad"	2:28
20.	"Harvey & Winnie"	0:40
21.	"Cheers"	0:11
22.	"Nobody Has Your Gear Box"	0:55
23.	"Fire By the Lodge"	3:39
24.	"Behind Enemy Lines"	2:24
25.	"Evacuation"	1:25
26.	"Blade is Down"	1:04
27.	"Loopin' Lopez"	1:14
28.	"Tourist Trapped"	2:28
29.	"Fire Heroes"	2:18
30.	"Rescue Harvey & Winnie"	2:09
31.	"Dusty Saves the Day"	0:53
32.	"Saving Dusty"	1:07
33.	"You Had Us Worried"	3:12
Total length:		56:37

== Video game ==
A video game based on the film, titled Disney Planes: Fire & Rescue, was released on November 4, 2014, for Wii, Nintendo 3DS, and Wii U and was published by Little Orbit.

== Cancelled sequel and spin-offs ==
In July 2017, during the D23 Expo, it was announced that a third film in the Planes series was in development. The film, tentatively titled Beyond the Sky, was to explore the future of aviation in outer space. The film had a release date of April 12, 2019. On March 1, 2018, it was removed from the release schedule. On June 28, 2018, Disneytoon Studios was shut down, ending development on the film.

Before its closure, Disneytoon Studios also had several other films set in the Cars world on various stages of development. Their plans included films based on trains and boats. In November 2022, concept art for one of the proposed films, tentatively titled Metro, leaked online.

== Legacy ==
The film's location of Piston Peak National Park served as inspiration for an upcoming area at Magic Kingdom themed to Pixar's Cars franchise.
