= Hard Cash (2002 film) =

2002 film by Predrag Antonijević

- US DVD cover
- Directed by: Predrag Antonijević
- Written by: Willie Dreyfus
- Produced by: John Thompson; David Varot; Danny Lerner; Randall Emmett; George Furla; Joseph A. Nittolo; Allan Kassirer
- Starring: Christian Slater; Val Kilmer; Bokeem Woodbine; Sara Downing
- Cinematography: Phil Parmet
- Edited by: Ljiljana-Lana Vukobratovic
- Music by: Steve Edwards
- Production companies: Millennium Films; Emmett/Furla Films
- Distributed by: DEJ Productions
- Release dates: February 15, 2002 (Thailand); February 26, 2002 (United States)
- Running time: 98 minutes
- Country: United States
- Language: English

Hard Cash (also known as Run for the Money) is a direct-to-video action heist film, released in 2002.

== Plot ==
Master thief Thomas Taylor (Slater) is released on parole. Later, he uses his job as a Paramedic to rob an off-track betting office, inadvertently stealing cash that a corrupt FBI agent named 'Cornell' (Kilmer) had planned to steal himself. Cornell retaliates by kidnapping Taylor's daughter and forcing him and his crew to steal a large shipment of cash. Simultaneously, the Russian mafia wants revenge because the FBI's involvement prevented them from laundering the original cash. The members of Taylor's crew agree to the corrupt FBI heist, but each one plans to stab the others in the back and take the money for themselves. Taylor must satisfy or outwit the corrupt agent, the Russian mob, and the members of his own gang in order to escape with his daughter.

== Cast ==
- Christian Slater as Thomas Taylor
- Val Kilmer as FBI Agent Mark C. Cornell
- Sara Downing as Paige
- Vincent Laresca as Nikita
- Balthazar Getty as Eddie
- Bokeem Woodbine as "Rock"
- Daryl Hannah as Virginia
- Rodney Rowland as Butch
- Holliston Coleman as Megan
- Peter Woodward as FBI Agent Judd Jarvis
- Michael Anthony Rosas as José
- William Forsythe as Bo Young
- Verne Troyer as Attila
- Milos Milicevic as Attila's Guard
- Peter Jason as The Counter Boss

== Production ==
In March 2001, it was reported that Verne Troyer and Bokeem Woodbine were in final negotiations to co-star in In God We Trust,a heist film starring Christian Slater and Val Kilmer to be produced by Emmett/Furla Oasis and Nittolo Entertainment with financing and distribution to be handled by Millennium Films. The film was part of a 10 film deal between Emmett/Furla Oasis and Millennium.
