= Backtrace (film) =

2018 American action crime thriller film by Brian A. Miller

- Theatrical release poster
- Directed by: Brian A. Miller
- Screenplay by: Mike Maples
- Produced by: Randall Emmett; George Furla; Matt Luber; Mark Stewart
- Starring: Sylvester Stallone; Ryan Guzman; Meadow Williams; Christopher McDonald; Colin Egglesfield; Lydia Hull; Tyler Jon Olson; Sergio Rizzuto; Swen Temmel; Matthew Modine
- Cinematography: Peter Holland
- Music by: Tim Jones
- Production companies: Grindstone Entertainment Group; Emmett/Furla/Oasis Films; Diamond Film Productions LLC; Ingenious Media; Dreamscape Productions; The Fyzz; Happinet (I); Highland Film Group
- Distributed by: Lionsgate Premiere
- Release date: December 14, 2018 (United States)
- Running time: 87 minutes
- Country: United States
- Language: English
- Budget: $6 million
- Box office: $490,636

Backtrace is a 2018 American action crime thriller film directed by Brian A. Miller, and starring Sylvester Stallone, Matthew Modine and Ryan Guzman. The film was released as video on demand and limited theatrical release by Lionsgate Premiere on December 14, 2018 in the United States.

== Plot ==
After suffering a brain injury from a bank heist gone wrong, MacDonald (Matthew Modine) develops amnesia and is put into a prison psychiatric ward. Following his seventh year in evaluation, he is coerced by an inmate and a ward doctor (Ryan Guzman and Meadow Williams) to break out of prison and injected with a serum that forces him to relive the life he's forgotten. MacDonald must now elude a local detective (Sylvester Stallone), a toughened FBI agent (Christopher McDonald) and the drug's dangerous side effects in order to recover the stolen money all while confronting his past.

== Cast ==
- Sylvester Stallone as Detective Sykes: An experienced police detective, assigned to work with Agent Franks on the case involving Donovan MacDonald.
- Matthew Modine as Donovan "Mac" MacDonald: A suspected bank robber and thief, who is overcome with amnesia following a shootout. MacDonald is imprisoned in a prison psychiatric hospital for seven years, before escaping and seeking to remember his past and prove his innocence.
- Ryan Guzman as Lucas MacDonald: Introduced as MacDonald's inmate in prison, it is later revealed that Lucas is MacDonald's son.
- Meadow Williams as Dr. Erin MacDonald: Introduced as the medical official attending to MacDonald's condition in prison; it is later revealed that Erin is MacDonald's wife. Williams additionally served as executive producer on the film.
- Tyler Jon Olson as Farren MacDonald: Introduced as a security guard, assigned to MacDonald while in prison; it is later revealed that Farren is MacDonald's son.
- Christopher McDonald as Agent Franks: An FBI special agent, assigned to the investigation involving Donovan MacDonald. Franks is revealed to be the criminal mastermind, guilty with framing MacDonald and his family.
- Colin Egglesfield as Detective Carter: A young police detective, who works as the protégé under Det. Sykes on the case involving Donovan MacDonald.
- Brooks Nader as Orderly Lisa
- Jenna Willis as Detective Bay
- Lydia Hull as Dr. Nichols
- Baylee Curran as Secure Guard Alicia

== Production ==
Backtrace was officially announced in November 2018, co-starring Sylvester Stallone, Matthew Modine and Ryan Guzman. Brian A. Miller served as director, with a script written by Mike Maples, the story was detailed as an action crime-thriller involving Stallone's Det. Sykes pursuit of an escaped convicted psychotic bank robber.

Miller described the project as a whodunit-styled crime mystery. The filmmaker described his experiences with the cast with high praise, noting his life-long fandom of Sylvester Stallone. Miller stated that Stallone's experiences in filmmaking enhanced the film, classifying Stallone as an auteur. The filmmaker additionally that though the final act is a plot-twist, clues and hints are scattered throughout the movie, intended for repeated viewings from the audience. The script underwent several rewrites, prior to production, with major plot changes; while McDonald, Guzman, and Egglesfield joined production immediately after receiving word that Stallone had signed on to co-star in the film.

The film was shot in Savannah, Georgia and lasted 12 days. Production endured varied unexpected weather patterns, but quickly completed principal photography.

== Release ==
=== Theatrical ===
Backtrace was given a limited-theatrical, and simultaneous VOD release on December 14, 2018.

=== Home media ===
It was later released on home video, on February 19, 2019. Backtrace grossed $0 in North America and $488,148 in other countries, plus $717,998 with home video sales.

== Reception ==
=== Critical response ===
The film received generally negative reviews with critics criticizing the plot, while giving praise to the performances of Stallone and Guzman. On Rotten Tomatoes, the film has an approval rating of 9%, based on 11 reviews, with an average rating of 2.2/10.

Joe Leydon of Variety gave the film a positive review, stating: "Matthew Modine is outstanding as an amnesia-stricken bank robber in Brian A. Miller's VOD-centric thriller."

Kevin L. Lee of Film Inquiry called the film a "cinematic...headache." The critic criticized the writing, and the film's tone. Similarly, Noel Murray of the Los Angeles Times critiqued the plot as unoriginal and familiar, stating: "A movie that very quickly becomes yet another story about people with guns chasing other people with guns, through featureless forests and abandoned buildings."
