= Inconceivable (2017 film) =

- Theatrical release poster
- Directed by: Jonathan Baker
- Written by: Chloe King
- Produced by: Jonathan Baker; Daniel Herther; Randall Emmett; George Furla
- Starring: Gina Gershon; Faye Dunaway; Nicolas Cage; Nicky Whelan
- Cinematography: Brandon Cox
- Edited by: Richard Byard
- Music by: Kevin Kiner
- Production companies: Grindstone Entertainment; Emmett/Furla/Oasis Films; INGENIOUS; JB Entertainment
- Distributed by: Lionsgate Premiere
- Release date: June 30, 2017
- Running time: 106 minutes
- Country: United States
- Language: English
- Budget: $12.8 million
- Box office: $259,635

Inconceivable is a 2017 American thriller film directed by Jonathan Baker and written by Chloe King. It stars Gina Gershon, Faye Dunaway, Nicolas Cage, Nicky Whelan and Natalie Eva Marie. The film was released on June 30, 2017, by Lionsgate Premiere.

== Plot ==
While holding a crying baby, a woman fights with and kills a man. Four years later, Angela (Gina Gershon) and Brian (Nicolas Cage), both doctors, have a four-year-old daughter named Cora. Angela's friend Linda (Natalie Eva Marie) introduces Angela to Katie (Nicky Whelan), who has a four-year-old daughter, Maddie. Katie says she left an abusive husband but does not elaborate. Brian's mother, Donna, (Faye Dunaway) dislikes Katie from the start and questions her background.

Devastated after a miscarriage, Angela invites Katie to move into the guest house and be a part-time nanny while she recovers. One night, knowing Brian is watching, Katie steps naked into the pool. Brian becomes uncomfortable and leaves. When Angela returns to work at the hospital, Katie watches Cora.

Katie snoops through Angela and Brian's belongings. Angela comes home after work one day and catches Katie having sex in the guest house with whom she thinks is Brian, but is actually a woman. After the initial embarrassment, Angela relaxes somewhat and trusts Katie more, not believing she would ever have any interest in Brian. Linda excitedly tells Katie that Angela is going to ask her to be their surrogate, but Katie can barely hide how much it upsets her.

Angela has one embryo left from the same donor that Cora was conceived from, and she wants to use that so the two can be full siblings. Katie confides to Linda that she is the donor, and that her daughter Maddie was also hers but born from a mother in Maine. Katie abducted Maddie as a baby because "the mother didn't take care of her" and now she worries that Cora is not getting enough attention either and wants to take her. She clubs Linda over the head and drowns her in a lake. A couple later finds her body.

Months later, Angela and Brian tell Katie they are getting a full-time nanny, and Katie accuses them of wanting a complete stranger to raise their child. Angela suspects Katie is planning to keep the baby and disappear, and accuses her of killing Linda because she wanted it for herself. Katie fakes early labor pains. Brian is furious with Angela and is told by Katie that she is taking illegal prescription meds and losing her mind.

The next morning, while Brian is at work, Angela sneaks into the guest house and discovers Katie's secrets, confirming that she was a previous donor; she then gets a DNA test for the girls. While dropping off the DNA samples, Angela becomes very light headed and woozy, and tries to rush home, but then passes out while driving. Once she wakes, she realizes that Katie has drugged her and rushes home, where she confronts Katie, who admits everything to Angela and stabs herself in the stomach, then screams for Brian while stabbing Angela. Katie says she is going to tell everyone that Angela tried to kill her and Angela tells Katie that the truth will come out.

Katie is taken to the ER and an emergency C-section takes place. A healthy baby boy named Gabriel is born. The DNA test comes back and shows that Maddie and Cora were related to each other and to Katie, meaning Angela had told the truth. Katie is arrested then shown in a padded cell whilst the happy family of Brian, Angela, Maddie, Cora and Gabriel are shown all resting together.

== Cast ==
- Gina Gershon as Angela
- Nicolas Cage as Brian
- Nicky Whelan as Katie
- Faye Dunaway as Donna
- Natalie Eva Marie as Linda
- Jonathan Baker as Barry
- Ellie Peyton MacDonald as Baby Maddie

== Production ==
The project was unveiled during the 2014 Sundance Film Festival by Lindsay Lohan who said she would both produce and star in it. Producer and financier Randall Emmett said during a press conference announcing the project that audiences would be "really shocked when they see Lindsay take this role on". Lohan, who was also looking for a director, expressed interest in working with Jessica Lange and Juliette Lewis. In May 2015, Deadline reported that the film would mark Jonathan Baker's directorial debut. Baker also signed a deal to co-produce the film through his newly formed production company, Baker's Entertainment Group, with Emmett and his partner George Furla of Emmett/Furla/Oasis Films.

In October 2015, Baker announced through his Facebook page that Faye Dunaway and Gina Gershon were in talks to join the cast. In September 2016, it was announced Nicolas Cage, Faye Dunaway, Gina Gershon and Nicky Whelan had signed on to star in the film. That same month, Baker confirmed Whelan had replaced Lohan and wrote on his Facebook page, "As for Lindsay Lohan not being a part of Inconceivable..... The fans deserve to know, I loved her for the part of Katie. I fought for her to the very end. Sadly the studio has the final say and they just did not want to go in that direction. I think Lindsay is a very good actress." Baker later explained he tried to convince several major actresses to play the part, "Here's what happened, and here's the crazy thing: I go out to every major movie star—I just lost my mind—I went out for six months to major, major stars and they'd say, 'Who's the man?' I said, 'Are you kidding me? I'm offering you millions of dollars!'" Although his inability to convince a major actress left him frustrated, Baker changed his approach and offered a supporting role to Nicolas Cage, asking him to support the women.

Principal photography began on October 10, 2016, and was supposed to last three and a half weeks but was subsequently reduced to 15 days. Dunaway broke her leg a few days before filming but Baker refused to recast the role, as it had been written specifically for her, and rewrote her part so that she would be able to perform sitting down, "She was in so much pain and she came to the set and she worked did what she needed to do, she's an Oscar winner, a great actress and this is a small come-back role that was written in 12 hours so that it would flow with the script."

== Release ==
The film was simultaneously released in select theaters and video on demand on June 30, 2017.

== Reception ==
On review aggregator Rotten Tomatoes, the film holds an approval rating of 38% based on 13 reviews and an average rating of 3.7/10. Frank Scheck of The Hollywood Reporter wrote that it was "something that both Nicolas Cage and Faye Dunaway will want to leave off their filmographies, and at this point that's saying something."

Noel Murray of the Los Angeles Times commented that the actors were "poorly served by the script and direction. First-time feature-director Jonathan Baker keeps the pace too slack and the tone too earnest — and sometimes fails to convey basic visual information about what's happening."
