= Held for Ransom (2000 film) =

2000 American thriller film

- DVD cover
- Directed by: Lee Stanley
- Written by: Lois Duncan; Lee Stanley; Nickolas Perry
- Produced by: Randall Emmett; George Furla
- Starring: Dennis Hopper; Zachary Ty Bryan
- Cinematography: Steve Adcock
- Edited by: Danny Saphire
- Production company: Emmett/Furla Films
- Distributed by: Blockbuster Video
- Release date: November 14, 2000
- Running time: 88 minutes
- Country: United States
- Language: English
- Budget: $5 million

Held for Ransom is a 2000 direct-to-video thriller film starring Dennis Hopper, Zachery Ty Bryan, Morgan Fairchild and Debi Mazar. It was directed and written by Lee Stanley based on the novel by Lois Duncan.

== Plot ==
Five spoiled high-school students are kidnapped and held for ransom in a remote swamp area.

== Cast ==
- Dennis Hopper as J.D.
- Zachery Ty Bryan as Glenn Kirtland
- Kam Heskin as Jesse McCormick
- Tsianina Joelson as Marianne
- Jordan Brower as Bruce Kirtland
- Randy Spelling as Dexter
- Paul Dillon as John
- Morgan Fairchild as Mrs. Kirtland
- John Getz as Mr. Kirtland
- Timothy Bottoms as Fred Donavan
- Debi Mazar as Rita
- Joan Van Ark as Nancy Donovan
- Tyler Kuhn as Randy Donovan
- Shelly Burch as Mrs. McCormick
- Robert Noble as Mrs. Godfrey
- Keith MacKechnie as Detective Van Bommel
- David Siegel as Crime Scene Detective
- Russell Warner as Officer Matthews
- J.D. Husocki as Officer Bronson
- Joe Hess as Swamp Man #1
- Thomas Rosales, Jr. as Swamp Man #2

== Production ==
It was filmed over three weeks 1999 in the Everglades, Miami and Orlando Disney's MGM studios and surrounding areas.
