= Lukas Haas =

American actor (born 1976)

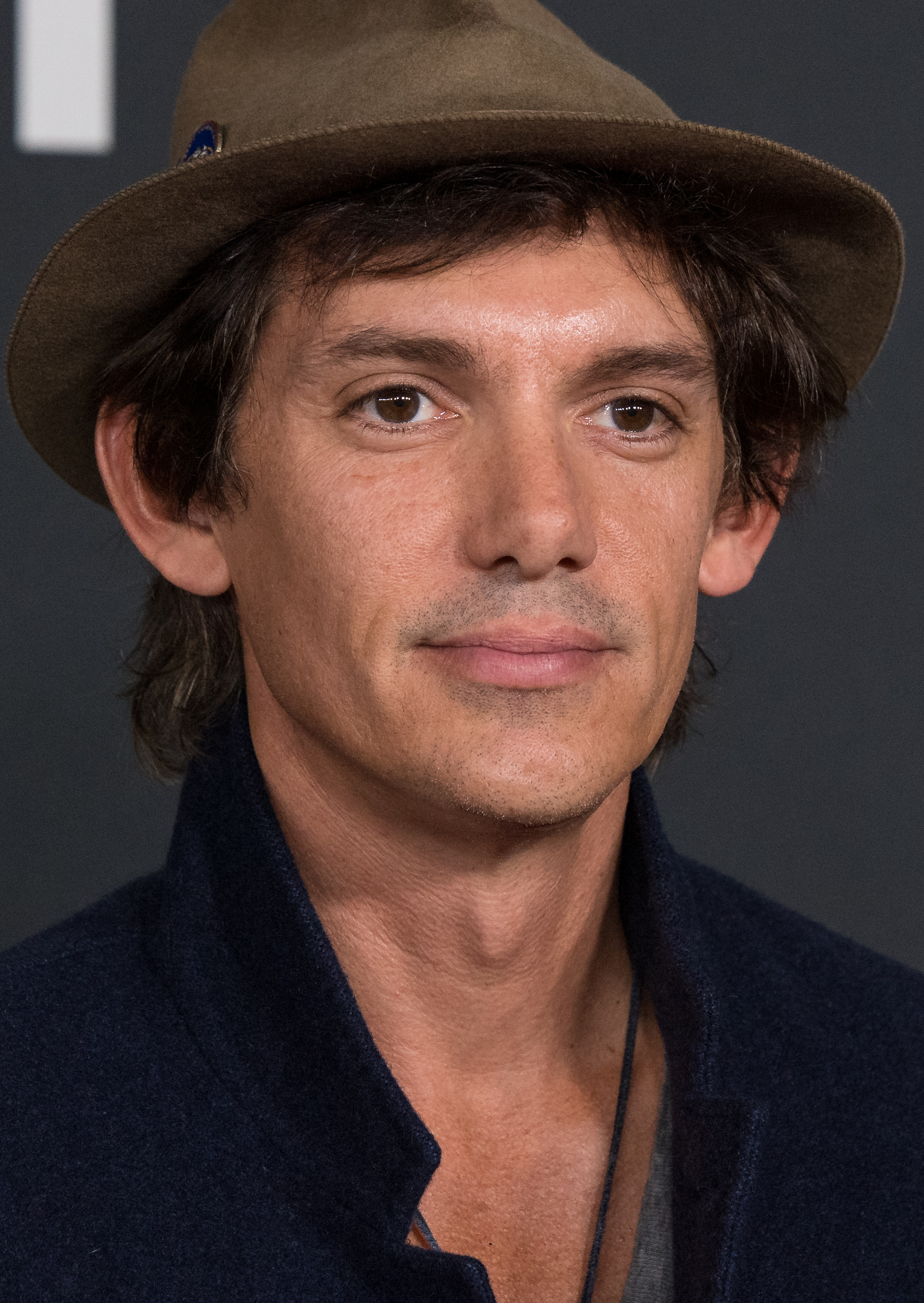
- Haas in October 2018
- Born: Lukas Daniel Haas; April 16, 1976 (age 50); West Hollywood, California, U.S.
- Occupations: Actor; musician
- Years active: 1983–present

Lukas Daniel Haas (born April 16, 1976) is an American actor and musician. His acting career has spanned four decades, during which he has appeared in more than 50 feature films and a number of television shows and stage productions. His notable credits include the films Witness (1985), Lady in White (1988), Mars Attacks! (1996), Brick (2005), Inception (2010), The Revenant (2015), and First Man (2018).

== Early life ==
Haas was born on April 16, 1976, in West Hollywood, California, the son of Berthold Haas, an artist, and Emily Tracy, an author. His mother is from Texas, and his father emigrated from Germany. He has two brothers: twins Simon Jakoway Haas and Nikolai Johannes Haas, both designers.

== Career ==
=== Acting ===
Haas was discovered at the age of five in his kindergarten by casting director Margery Simkin. His first screen role was as a child in the 1983 nuclear holocaust film Testament. He became more widely known in 1985 when, at the age of eight, he appeared in Witness. His performance as an Amish boy who is the sole witness to a police officer's murder was well received by critics. Haas followed this with roles in Solarbabies (1986) and Lady in White (1988). In 1989, he appeared in the film Music Box, as the 12-year-old son of Jessica Lange's character, and grandson of an immigrant who is accused of being a war criminal. For this role he was nominated for the Young Artist Award. He also starred in the films Alan and Naomi (1992) and Rambling Rose (1991).

Haas received an Emmy nomination for his portrayal of Ryan White in the television film The Ryan White Story (1989), about an American teenager who contracted AIDS through contaminated blood treatments for hemophilia. On stage in 1988, he performed in Samuel Beckett's Waiting for Godot at Lincoln Center in New York City. He went on to appear in Everyone Says I Love You, Mars Attacks!, and Breakfast of Champions. His work in the 2000s includes Brick, Last Days, and While She Was Out. Haas also gained recognition for his portrayal of The Patient in the music video for the My Chemical Romance song "Welcome to the Black Parade".

In March 2010, Haas was inducted into the Texas Film Hall of Fame. More recently he appeared in Red Riding Hood, Contraband and Christopher Nolan's Inception. He has made guest appearances in Amazing Stories, both the 1985 and the 2002 versions of The Twilight Zone, The Young Indiana Jones Chronicles, As Told by Ginger, The Zeta Project, 24, Criminal Minds, Dirt and Entourage. He had a role on the 2012 television series Touch. In 2014, he co-starred in the horror film Dark Was the Night.

In 2018, Haas played astronaut Michael Collins, the Apollo 11 command module pilot, in First Man, a film about the first human Moon landing space flight in 1969. The film was directed by Damien Chazelle, with whom he reunited in the 2022 film Babylon.

In September 2024, he was cast in a recurring role on the superhero series Spider-Noir.

=== Music ===
Haas is the drummer and pianist for The Rogues. He has composed parts of several film soundtracks, including Breakfast of Champions and Last Days, and performed as a guest musician on the Macy Gray album The Trouble with Being Myself and the Jet album Shaka Rock. In 2008, he released a solo EP. He appeared in the music videos for OutKast's "Roses," My Chemical Romance's "Welcome to the Black Parade," UGK's "International Player's Anthem (I Choose You)," Death Cab For Cutie's "Cath…," and Jet's "She's a Genius".

On February 25, 2011, the media announced that Haas had released a musical collaboration with Isabel Lucas called "Made for You". The recorded and video clip were filmed in Haas' L.A. studio, and were later revealed to be a marketing campaign of the Portuguese band The Gift for their album Explode.

== Filmography ==
=== Film ===
Year	Title	Role	Notes
1983	Testament	Scottie Wetherly	
1985	Witness	Samuel Lapp	
1986	Solarbabies	Daniel	
1988	Lady in White	Frankie Scarlatti	
1988	The Wizard of Loneliness	Wendall	
1989	See You in the Morning	Petey Goodwin	
1989	Music Box	Mikey Talbot	
1991	Convicts	Horace Robedaux	
1991	Rambling Rose	Buddy	
1992	Alan & Naomi	Alan Silverman	
1992	Leap of Faith	Boyd	
1996	Everyone Says I Love You	Scott	
1996	Boys	John Baker Jr	
1996	Mars Attacks!	Richie Norris	
1996	Johns	Donner	
1997	Kiss & Tell	Don the Forensic Intern	
1998	In Quiet Night	Russell	"David and Lisa"
1999	Breakfast of Champions	George "Bunny" Hoover	
2000	Running Free	Narrator	Voice
2001	Zoolander	Himself	
2001	The Pearl	Kino	
2002	Long Time Dead	Webster	
2003	Bookies	Casey Young	
2005	Brick	The Pin	
2005	Last Days	Luke	
2005	Dingle, Barry	Matt Huggins	
2006	Material Girls	Henry Baines	
2006	The Darwin Awards	Farley	
2006	Who Loves the Sun	Will Morrison	
2006	The Tripper	Ivan	
2006	Swedish Auto	Carter	
2006	Alpha Dog	Buzz Fecske	
2007	The Cradle	Frank	
2007	Gardener of Eden	Adam Harris	
2008	T Takes	The Guest in Room 108	
2008	Death in Love	Youngest Son	
2008	While She Was Out	Chuckie	
2008	The Brothers Bloom	Bar Patron	Uncredited
2009	The Perfect Age of Rock 'n' Roll	Clifton Hangar	
2010	Inception	Nash	
2011	Red Riding Hood	Father Auguste	
2011	Crazy Eyes	Zach	
2012	Contraband	Danny Raymer	
2012	Lincoln	First White Soldier	
2013	Meth Head	Kyle	
2013	Jobs	Daniel Kottke	
2013	Pawn Shop Chronicles	Vernon	
2014	Transcendence	James Thomas	
2014	Dark Was the Night	Donny Saunders	
2015	Always Worthy	Breck	
2015	Tooken	Buddy #1	Credited as Lucas Haas
2015	The Revenant	Jones	
2017	2031	Ethan	Short film
2018	First Man	Michael Collins	
2018	Widows	David	
2020	The Violent Heart	Joseph	
2021	Midnight in the Switchgrass	Peter Hillborough	
2022	Babylon	George Munn	Nominated—Screen Actors Guild Award for Outstanding Performance by a Cast in a Motion Picture
2024	Cash Out	Shawn Goddard	
2025	High Rollers	Shawn Goddard	
2025	Crystal Cross	TBA	
2026	The Gentleman Thief	Shawn Goddard	
2026	Fortitude	TBA	Post-production

=== Television ===
Year	Title	Role	Notes
1984	Jessie	Tim Buckley	Episode: "In the Line of Duty"
1984	Trapper John, M.D.	Nicholas	Episode: "Double Bubble"
1984	Love Thy Neighbor	Bobby Leob	Television film
1985	Brothers-in-Law	Luke	Television film
1985	Amazing Stories	Brian Globe	Episode: "Ghost Train"
1986	Shattered Spirits	Brian Mollencamp	Television film
1986	The Twilight Zone	Mike	Segment: "What Are Friends For?"
1987	CBS Schoolbreak Special	Mike Sanders	Episode: "My Dissident Mom"
1989	The Ryan White Story	Ryan White	Television film
1991	The Perfect Tribute	Benjamin Blair	Television film
1993	The Young Indiana Jones Chronicles	Norman Rockwell	Episode: "Paris, September 1908"
1994	Warrior Spirit	Rod	Television film
1995	Tales of the Wild	Rod Elliot	Episode: "Chasseurs de loups, chasseurs d'or"
1998	David and Lisa	David	Television film
2001	Son of the Beach	Krazy	Episode: "Queefer Madness"
2001–2002	Heavy Gear: The Animated Series	Marcus Rover	Voice, 10 episodes
2002	As Told by Ginger	Jake	Voice, episode: "Fast Reputation"
2002	The Zeta Project	Casey MacCurdy	Voice, episode: "On the Wire"
2002	Lathe of Heaven	George Orr	Television film
2002	The Twilight Zone	Corey Williams	Episode: "Harsh Mistress"
2003	Justice League	Private	Voice, episode: "Eclipsed"
2005	Criminal Minds	Clerk (The Footpath Killer)	2 episodes
2005	24	Andrew Paige	3 episodes
2007	Dirt	Marqui Jackson	2 episodes
2008	Entourage	L.B.	2 episodes
2013	Touch	Calvin Norburg	Season 2: 11 episodes
2022	War of the Worlds	Richard	Main role
2023	The Righteous Gemstones	Chuck Montgomery	Recurring role
2026	Spider-Noir	Winston	Recurring role

=== Music videos ===
- "Roses" (2004) by OutKast as the Dancing Student
- "Welcome to the Black Parade" (2006) by My Chemical Romance as the Patient
- "International Players Anthem (I Choose You)" (2007) by UGK as groomsman
- "Cath..." (2008) by Death Cab for Cutie

== Bibliography ==
- Holmstrom, John. The Moving Picture Boy: An International Encyclopaedia from 1895 to 1995, Norwich, Michael Russell, 1996, p. 398.
