= Blind Horizon =

- DVD cover
- Directed by: Michael Haussman
- Written by: F. Paul Benz; Steve Tomlin
- Produced by: Randall Emmett
- Starring: Val Kilmer; Neve Campbell; Sam Shepard; Noble Willingham; Amy Smart; Gil Bellows; Giancarlo Esposito
- Cinematography: Max Malkin
- Edited by: Quincy Z. Gunderson; Alain Jakubowicz; David Jakubovic
- Music by: Tobias Enhus; Mark Kilian; Machine Head; Christopher Mann; Adam Schiff
- Production company: Emmett/Furla Films
- Distributed by: Lionsgate
- Release date: December 16, 2003
- Running time: 99 minutes
- Country: United States
- Language: English
- Budget: $5 million

Blind Horizon is a 2003 American conspiracy mystery thriller film directed by Michael Haussman. The screenplay was co-written by F. Paul Benz and Steve Tomlin. The leading cast includes Val Kilmer, Neve Campbell, Sam Shepard, Amy Smart and Faye Dunaway.

== Plot ==
In the outskirts of rural New Mexico, Frank Kavanaugh, an unconscious man, is discovered by two local ranch hands. Suffering from a gunshot wound to the head, he is rushed to a nearby hospital in a small town called Black Point. Due to the extent of his injuries, Kavanaugh is placed in an intensive care unit under the care of a trauma nurse named Liz. After regaining consciousness, Kavanaugh is interviewed by Sheriff Kolb; however, because of his head injuries, he is unable to explain what has transpired due to a case of temporary amnesia. Given his condition, Kavanaugh is ordered to stay in the hospital for closer observation.

Much to their dismay, Sheriff Kolb and his deputies are unable to find any clues as to what might have happened to Kavanaugh. After a thorough search of the crime scene, Sheriff Kolb returns to the hospital to find that Kavanaugh, in a violent and confused state, is claiming to have knowledge of a possible assassination attempt on the president of the United States. Dr. Conway persuades Kavanaugh to remain calm and later explains to Sheriff Kolb that his paranoia stems from a delusional side effect of the amnesia. Amongst the added confusion, Kavanaugh experiences a myriad of images that could be pure fantasy or actual pre-amnesiatic memories. The most vivid image, one in which a dark, shadowy figure is seen talking with a mysterious woman named Ms. K, hints at various details of a possible assassination attempt involving key government parties. However, because of Kavanaugh's deranged state, he is unable to differentiate between reality and fantasy.

Sheriff Kolb believes that there is some credibility to Kavanaugh's story and continues to question him. To further complicate matters for Kavanaugh, his fiancée, Chloe, arrives at the hospital and makes arrangements for his immediate release. It is then revealed through Chloe that she and Kavanaugh are actually from Chicago and that Kavanaugh works for the IRS. She produces documentation that verifies Kavanaugh's employment with the government and further explains to Sheriff Kolb that she and Kavanaugh were in New Mexico on vacation. She also produces a seaside photo of Kavanaugh and herself walking on a beach as further proof that she is his fiancée. Kavanaugh still strongly believes in an imminent attempt on the president's life and later calls the US Secret Service and warns them of an assassination plot that will occur in Black Point within the next few days. Distraught over his situation, Chloe convinces Kavanaugh to leave the hospital with her, and she drives him back to the motel they had checked into days earlier. Incidentally, recent news updates reveal that the president and his campaign team have been touring the Southwest and will arrive in New Mexico within the next few days.

As the president arrives and prepares to address the public, Kavanaugh attempts to follow what evidence he has to warn the authorities and avert the assassination. While viewing the president from a nearby building, Kavanaugh discovers a set of sniper's equipment, including a rifle, which he instinctively assembles. Taking aim out of the window, he sights the president through the scope of the rifle and realizes that he, in fact, is the assassin and that his flashbacks are of all the preparation leading up to the date of the event. He notices another assassin taking aim at the president with his sniper rifle from the other side. Understanding that he has the power to change the course of events, Kavanaugh aims at the other assassin through his scope and shoots him, killing him and averting the assassination.

== Cast ==
- Val Kilmer as Frank Kavanaugh
- Neve Campbell as Chloe Richards
- Sam Shepard as Sheriff Jack Kolb
- Noble Willingham as Deputy Shirl Cash
- Amy Smart as Liz Culpepper
- Gil Bellows as Dr. Theodore Conway
- Giancarlo Esposito as J.C. Reynolds
- Charles Ortiz as Nico
- Leo Fitzpatrick as Sterling
- Trajan Cuevas as Dale Petmecky
- Jesus Mayorga as Dwight Petmecky
- Cole S. McKay as Burly Trucker
- Guadalupe A. Garcia as Navaro
- Faye Dunaway as Ms. K
- Ellen Blake as Helsa
- John B. Thayer as President
- Boots Southerland as Tom Brandt
- Shirly Brener as Darious Thorestensen
- Tim Carroll as Mexican Stranger
- John Hardman as Bartender
- Michelle Allred as Dancing Girl / Housekeeper
- Roy Tanner as Barber
- Thomas W. Poster as Balding Man
- Todd Anderson as Portly Barber
- William Sterchi as Bottle Nose Man
- Troy Dunlap as Reporter
- Joe Downey as Distinguished Man
- Stephen Glover as Man with Hat in Final Scene
- Simon Rhee as Hotel Man
- Richard Barela as Store Clerk
- Stephen Eiland as Bar Patron
- Jose Jacinto Marquez as Shopkeeper
- Heather McCluskey as News Crew Producer
- Chance Romero as Reporter
- Kriston Rutherford as Reporter
- J. Nathan Simmons as Parade Watcher
- Dar Warison as Townsperson
- Blake Woodruff as Crying Boy

== Production ==
In April 2001, it was reported that FilmEngine had Blind Horizon in development as a production for producers Newman-Tooley. In October 2002, it was reported that Val Kilmer would star in Blind Horizon for director Michael Haussman and producers Emmett/Furla Oasis with production to begin in New Mexico. In December of that year, it was reported that Neve Campbell, Amy Smart, Sam Shepard, and Faye Dunaway had joined the cast. In January 2003, the New Mexico Investment Council voted to invest $4.7 million in the form of a guaranteed interest-free loan in exchange for 5% profit participation.
