= Gun (2010 film) =

- Poster
- Directed by: Jessy Terrero
- Written by: Curtis Jackson
- Produced by: Randall Emmett; Curtis Jackson; George Furla
- Starring: Curtis Jackson; Val Kilmer; AnnaLynne McCord; James Remar; Danny Trejo; La La; Christa Campbell; John Larroquette
- Cinematography: Zeus Morand
- Edited by: Kirk Morri
- Music by: Ben Zarai; David Allen Kitchens
- Production companies: Cheetah Vision Films; Hannibal Pictures; Richard Jackson Films; 120 Tax Credit Finance; Emmett/Furla Films
- Distributed by: Image Entertainment
- Release date: July 30, 2010 (New York Latino)
- Running time: 82 minutes
- Country: United States
- Language: English

Gun is a 2010 American crime action film directed by Jessy Terrero, written by 50 Cent and starring himself, Val Kilmer and James Remar. Filming took place in Detroit and Grand Rapids, Michigan.

The film premiered at the New York International Latino Film Festival.

== Synopsis ==
Angel (Kilmer) is released from prison only to get involved in the gun-running ring of his old friend, Rich (Jackson). They raid a club, which results in the killing of a rival arms dealer called Ali Tyrell.

A police officer is assigned to investigate and calls a meeting, but two ATF agents come in disrupting the meeting. The discussion continues and centres around a mathematics teacher who bought a Smith & Wesson firearm, which was stolen from his house and used by a gangster in another killing. He decides to sell the gun back to the same shop it was originally bought from and it is then passed on to Rich and his gang.

Angel teams up with Rich who helped him before to move guns and gets involved with the torture of an arms dealer who lied to them. Rich also meets a news reporter to talk about the gun business.

The next day Angel meets with the police and it's shown that he was let out of prison to be an informant for them (a flashback scene shows his wife being killed as a result of the illegal arms trade). The reporter who met with Rich, goes to her wealthy boss proposing to sell advanced guns to him, but her boss is unsure saying he might simply be a thug selling firearms.

The next day they meet without knowing that Angel is against them and the police are seeing their every move. The boss introduces himself to Rich and gives his van full of guns to him. He calls one of his minions to give Rich one of the guns to examine. Rich immediately agrees to buy them and is just about to pay when the police attack. During the fight Rich gets shot. Angel rescues him, but when they are alone turns and points his gun at Rich, who realizes that Angel has been the rat all along.

Angel tells him that the cocktail waitress killed in an earlier raid that was his wife. Rich laughs and tells Angel that he is just like him, a killer, and that everybody that Angel has killed was someone's son or husband. As Angel breaks down, Rich pulls a gun, but Angel gets the shot off first and is about to kill him, when a police agent shoots Angel.

In the closing scenes, time has elapsed and Angel is shown walking down a corridor with a sling on his arm, meeting with his daughter. The police agent is seen walking into his office, answering questions on how he feels about the plea bargain which Rich has obtained. The final scene shows Rich walking to his cell in handcuffs, looking up through the bars of the cell as it is opening.

== Cast ==
- 50 Cent as Rich
- Val Kilmer as Angel
- AnnaLynne McCord as Gabriella
- James Remar as Detective Rogers
- Malik Barnhardt as Ali
- Paul Calderón as Detective Jenkins
- Christa Campbell as News Reporter
- Josh Carrizales as Valentine
- Alton Clinton as Ali's Crew #1
- Jill Dugan as Angel's Wife
- Mark Famiglietti as ATF Agent Peterson
- Gary Darnell Jackson Jr. as Young Rich
- Hassan Johnson as Clinton
- Kristin Kandrac as News Reporter #2
- Anthony Kennedy as Rich's Dad
- John Larroquette as Sam
- Mike Malin as ATF Agent Monroe
- Charles Malik Whitfield as Dante
- Danny Trejo as Frankie Makina
