= 7 Days to Vegas =

2019 American comedy film

- Theatrical release poster
- Directed by: Eric Balfour
- Screenplay by: Steve Alper; Vincent Van Patten
- Produced by: Vince Van Patten; James Van Patten; Adam Weinraub; Kim Waltrip
- Starring: Vincent Van Patten; Ross McCall; Paul Walter Hauser; Eileen Davidson; James Van Patten; Willie Garson; Lucas Bryant; Don Stark; John O'Hurley; Chad Lowe; Jennifer Tilly
- Cinematography: Christopher Gallo
- Edited by: Paul Buhl
- Music by: Bret Mazur
- Production companies: Van Patten Brothers Entertainment; WonderStar Productions; Big Block Media Holdings (in association with); World Poker Tour Enterprises (co-production)
- Distributed by: Gravitas Ventures
- Release date: September 20, 2019
- Running time: 92 mins
- Country: United States
- Language: English

7 Days to Vegas (also known as Walk to Vegas) is a 2019 American comedy film directed by Eric Balfour. Vincent Van Patten is the co-writer along with Steve Alper.

The film stars Vincent Van Patten, Ross McCall, Paul Walter Hauser, Eileen Davidson, James Van Patten, Willie Garson, Lucas Bryant, Don Stark, John O'Hurley, Chad Lowe, Jennifer Tilly, James Kyson, Danny Pardo, Christina Vidal, Joseph Siprut, Aron Eisenberg, Denise DuBarry, and Kara Weinraub. 7 Days to Vegas would be Eisenberg's last performance as he died on September 21, 2019, one day after the film's release.

== Plot ==
Hollywood big shots bet on anything in "sin city".

Duke is a former actor living in LA who runs a local poker game with a variety of characters. One day, a film director named Sebastian joins the game and quickly becomes the best player. Sebastian, working in Hollywood, has access to wealthy people willing to play so Duke partners up with him to make more money. They start to have side bets on everything, from throwing paper balls in trash cans to who can jump blindfolded from the roof to the pool; while their poker game grows bigger and bigger and Sebastian's true colors start to show. His bets, in fact, are always rigged in his favor. Contrary to Duke, Sebastian is not after the money - it’s all about the thrill of winning for him. In fact, this is Duke's only source of income.

After a Ponzi scheme run by Sebastian's friend, Duke loses everything and Sebastian brags about how he had never invested a dime with the guy. This is when Duke has had enough and decides to put in motion a series of events that ends with a bet on Duke walking to Las Vegas in 7 days, a total of 280 miles, with pages of rules and stipulations. Duke gets $1,000,000 and puts it up against Sebastian's $5,000,000 that Duke can do it. The guys pile in an RV and follow Duke on his 7 day journey filled with prop bets along the way. There are plenty of double crosses and things are never what they seem and in the end everyone gets what they deserve... or do they?

== Cast ==
- Vincent Van Patten as Duke
- Ross McCall as Sebastian
- Paul Walter Hauser as Puppet Hank
- Eileen Davidson as KC
- James Van Patten as Carl
- Willie Garson as Danny
- Lucas Bryant as Chucky
- Don Stark as Angry Jim
- John O'Hurley as Walter
- Chad Lowe as Sheriff
- Jennifer Tilly as Jennifer
- James Kyson as Wing
- Danny Pardo as Sandor
- Christina Vidal as Papiana
- Joseph Siprut as Squeeze
- Aron Eisenberg as Peanut
- Denise DuBarry as Denise
- Kara Weinraub as Amanda
- Bianca Rae as Newscaster
- Michael Emory as Big Mike
- Eric Olsson as Jesus
- Dylan Vox as Masked Robber
- Kat Martin as Kat
- Antonio Esfandiari as Antonio
- Mike Sexton as himself
- Nels Van Patten as Hobo
- Renée Willett as Kelly Boots
- Tom Alper as Poker Bore
- Brandon Irvin as Poker Player
- Harvey B. Jackson as Poker Player
- Brandon Johnston as Golf Caddie Twin
- Mitch Johnston as Golf Caddie Twin
- Eduardo Lezcano as Preacher
- Brian Nowak as New Guy
- Ian Salmon as Saxophone Player

== Release ==
7 Days to Vegas was released in theatres on September 20, 2019. The film was released on DVD and Blu-ray on September 24, 2019, by Gravitas Ventures.

=== Critical response ===
Sheri Linden of The Hollywood Reporter wrote in her review: "Walk to Vegas does not take itself too serious."

Richard Roeper of the Chicago Sun-Times wrote in his review: "Gambling insiders will recognize the authentic representation of that world throughout the movie. But even if you don't know a busted straight from a royal flush and you've never heard of a prop bet until now, 7 Days to Vegas works as a broad and funny comedy about some truly bent but hilarious characters." He gave the film 3/4 stars.

Bruce Fessier of The Desert Sun wrote in his review: "Its characters are eccentric, if not psychologically disturbed."

== See also ==
- List of films set in Las Vegas
