= Finding Rin Tin Tin =

- French theatrical release poster
- Directed by: Danny Lerner
- Written by: David Rolland; Jim Tierney
- Produced by: Les Weldon; George Furla; Kirk M. Hallam
- Starring: Tyler Jensen; Ben Cross; Gregory Gudgeon; Steve O'Donnell; William Hope; Todd Jensen
- Cinematography: Emil Topuzov
- Edited by: Michele Gisser
- Music by: Stephen Edwards
- Production companies: Emmett/Furla Films; Tosca Pictures; First Look Studios; Metropolitan Filmexport; Millennium Films
- Distributed by: Nu Image Films
- Release dates: August 15, 2007 (France); September 16, 2008 (United States)
- Running time: 87 minutes
- Countries: Bulgaria; United States
- Language: English
- Budget: $9 million

Finding Rin Tin Tin is a 2007 family comedy film directed by Israeli filmmaker Danny Lerner. Based loosely on historical events, the film is the most recent in a long line that includes the canine character Rin Tin Tin.

== Plot ==
Rin Tin Tin, the legendary German Shepherd, is rescued as a shell-shocked puppy from the World War I battlefield in Lorraine, France, by Lee Duncan, an American serviceman. The puppy is taken to America and becomes the hero of several films made in the 1920s and 1930s.

== Cast ==
- Tyler Jensen as Lee Duncan
- Ben Cross as Nikolaus
- Gregory Gudgeon as Gaston
- Steve O'Donnell as Johnson
- William Hope as Major Snickens
- Todd Jensen as Captain Sandman
- Ivan Renkov as Jacques
- Ian Porter as Lt. Bryant
- Garrick Hagon as The General
- Michal Yanai as Monique
- Wesley Stiller as Steve

As Rin Tin Tin

- Oskar
- Sunny
- Mira
- Zuza
- Lana (teenage)
- Andy (teenage)

== Reception ==
Finding Rin Tin Tin is the lowest ranked film on the French website AlloCiné, compiling the ratings of several film critics and was unanimously ranked 1 star.

== Lawsuit ==
In October 2008, Daphne Hereford, an American woman breeding progeny of the original Rin Tin Tin, asked a federal court in Houston, Texas, to protect her rights to the Rin Tin Tin name. The judge ruled in favor of the filmmakers, declaring the use of the name in the film to be fair use.
