= Scarlet Pearl Casino =

American casino hotel in Mississippi

Scarlet Pearl Casino Resort
- Interactive map of Scarlet Pearl Casino Resort
- Location: D'Iberville, Mississippi; 9380 Central Avenue, D'Iberville, MS 39540; 30°25′33″N 88°53′26″W
- Opened: December 9, 2015
- No. of rooms: 300
- Gaming space: 68,000 sq ft (6,300 m^{2})
- Notable restaurants: Scarlet's Steak and Seafood (Steakhouse/Seafood); Under the Oak Cafe (American); Chopstx (Asian); Ami Pizza (Pizza/Sandwiches); Lounge Nocherie (Coffee Shop/Bakery)
- Casino type: Land-based
- Website: www.scarletpearlcasino.com

Scarlet Pearl Casino Resort is a casino and hotel in D'Iberville, Mississippi.

The resort has 300 hotel rooms, 68,000 square feet (6,300 m^{2}) of gaming space, including a newly built high limit area (opened late 2020) and amenities including a 36-hole miniature golf course, a buffet, and three other restaurants. The property also features a swimming pool and fitness center.

== History ==
The project, originally named the Can Can Casino Resort and Spa, gained site approval from the Mississippi Gaming Commission in February 2010, but development stalled because of the Great Recession. Revised plans for the casino, by now known as the Scarlet Pearl, were approved by the commission in December 2013. Groundbreaking was held in July 2014. The property opened on December 9, 2015, at a cost of $290 million.

On October 1, 2019, the Scarlet Pearl's sportsbook took one of the largest bets in sports-betting history when they accepted Jim "Mattress Mack" Mcingvale's $3.5 million wager on the Houston Astros to win the 2019 World Series. In total, Mcingvale wagered $6.2 million at the Scarlet Pearl over the course of October, 2019 with all wagers on the Houston Astros to win the World Series.

== See also ==
- List of casinos in Mississippi
