= Midnight in the Switchgrass =

2021 crime thriller film by Randall Emmett

- Theatrical release poster
- Directed by: Randall Emmett
- Written by: Alan Horsnail
- Produced by: Randall Emmett; George Furla; Alex Eckert; Timothy C. Sullivan
- Starring: Megan Fox; Bruce Willis; Emile Hirsch; Lukas Haas; Colson "MGK" Baker; Lydia Hull
- Cinematography: Duane Manwiller
- Edited by: Colby Parker Jr.
- Music by: Robin Stout; Liam Westbrook
- Production companies: Emmett Furla Oasis Films; The Pimienta Film Co.
- Distributed by: Lionsgate
- Release date: July 23, 2021
- Running time: 99 minutes
- Country: United States
- Language: English
- Box office: $97,518

Midnight in the Switchgrass is a 2021 American crime thriller film directed by Randall Emmett in his directorial debut, and written by Alan Horsnail. It stars Megan Fox, Bruce Willis, Emile Hirsch, Lukas Haas, Colson "MGK" Baker and Lydia Hull.

It was released in limited theaters and video-on-demand on July 23, 2021, by Lionsgate.

== Plot ==
Based on the true story of Texas's most dangerous serial killer, the film has the dramatization translocated to Florida. FBI Agent Karl Helter and his partner, Rebecca Lombardi, are very close to busting a sex trafficking ring. When they realize their investigation has crossed the path of a brutal serial killer, they team up with Florida Department of Law Enforcement Agent Byron Crawford, who has worked for years on the case. When Rebecca herself is abducted by their target and her life hangs in the balance, Byron, without asking for assistance from fellow law enforcement agents, has precious few hours to piece together the last clues and to put an end to the infamous "Truck Stop Killer".

Peter Hillborough lives happily with his wife and daughter in a one-family house. At a gas station, he pretends to want to help a young woman, Tracey Lee, who has been sedated by a man. He takes her with him in his truck and locks her up in his garden shed. Hillborough meets Lombardi in a bar, adds knockout drops to her drink and also locks her in his garden shed. Lombardi encourages Lee to try to escape, who finds refuge with a neighbor, Georgia Kellogg. Crawford reviews the camera footage from a gas station and comes to the conclusion that Hillborough is the suspect and arrives there in time.

== Cast ==
- Megan Fox as Rebecca Lombardi
- Bruce Willis as Karl Helter
- Emile Hirsch as Byron Crawford
- Lukas Haas as Peter Hillborough
- Colson Baker as Calvin
- Sistine Stallone as Heather
- Michael Beach as Detective Yarbrough
- Caitlin Carmichael as Tracey Lee
- Alec Monopoly as Suspect / Tall Man
- Welker White as Ms. Georgia Kellogg
- Jackie Cruz as Suzanna

== Production ==
On January 22, 2020, it was announced that film producer Randall Emmett would make his directorial debut on the film, with Emile Hirsch set to star. Megan Fox and Bruce Willis were cast on February 16, with filming beginning on March 9 in Pensacola, Florida.

On March 12, 2020, Lukas Haas, Colson Baker, Sistine Stallone, Caitlin Carmichael, Michael Beach, Welker White, Alec Monopoly, and Jackie Cruz joined the cast of the film.

On March 16, production on the film was halted because of the COVID-19 pandemic. Production on the film resumed on June 29.

== Release ==
Midnight in the Switchgrass had its world premiere on June 13, 2021, at the Tampa Theatre, where it was the closing night film of the Gasparilla International Film Festival. In attendance were Randall Emmett, Alan Horsnail, Timothy C. Sullivan, Lukas Haas, Emile Hirsch, Caitlin Carmichael, and Katalina Viteri. The screening was followed by a 40-minute Q & A moderated by Tyler Martinolich.

The film was later released in limited theaters and VOD on July 23, 2021, by Lionsgate. Megan Fox did not attend the film's Los Angeles premiere and cited concerns regarding the COVID-19 pandemic. Machine Gun Kelly did not respond, but on Twitter, he mentioned that he does not talk about a movie if it is trash. In response, Emile Hirsch posted a screenshot of Machine Gun Kelly's tweet on Instagram and stated, "We definitely disagree here, Colson![Machine Gun Kelly] Nothing but respect to you guys though - especially because you and Megan are so f#*king great in this movie."

=== Box office ===
As of February 7, 2026, Midnight in the Switchgrass grossed $97,518 in Portugal and Russia, plus $656,446 in home video sales.

== Reception ==
On the review aggregator website Rotten Tomatoes, 8% of 38 critics' reviews are positive, with an average rating of 3.4/10. The website's consensus reads: "Dull and predictable, Midnight in the Switchgrass squanders an evocative setting and some committed performances on a would-be thriller that rarely raises a sweat." Metacritic, which uses a weighted average, assigned the film a score of 24 out of 100, based on 9 critics, indicating "generally unfavorable" reviews.

In his review for The New York Times, Ben Kenigsberg said that "the atmosphere is thoroughly sleazy without being distinctive, and everything about the movie - the emotionless line readings, the half-baked back stories - exudes a terse functionality." In a positive review for the San Jose Mercury News, Randy Myers said that "it's worth a watch if you like serial killer thrillers but don't expect to see anything revolutionary going on."

Jesse Hassenger was less complimentary in his review for Paste Magazine by saying that it looks like the filmmakers are trying to punish Megan Fox for her performance in Till Death, and he concluded, "It's entirely because of Fox that Switchgrass stays compelling far longer than it should, raising vain hopes that she'll be able to work it into something pulpier and more defined. Despite the eventual disappointment, I hope she sticks with genre fare a bit longer, and finds some more shackles to break." Waldemar Dalenogare Neto rated the film 2 out of 10 and stated that it is one of the "most generic thrillers of the year (...) I really don't know yet what the purpose of this film is other than the fact that it tries to profit from Megan Fox's image and Bruce Willis."

== Accolades ==
Year	Award	Category	Nominee(s)	Result	Ref.
2022	Golden Raspberry Awards	Worst Actress	Megan Fox	Nominated	
2022	Golden Raspberry Awards	Worst Performance by Bruce Willis in a 2021 Movie	Bruce Willis	Nominated [Rescinded] (Note: Following Willis' aphasia diagnosis in March 2022, the category and its nominations were rescinded by the Golden Raspberry Foundation.)	
