= Danny Pardo =

Argentinian actor

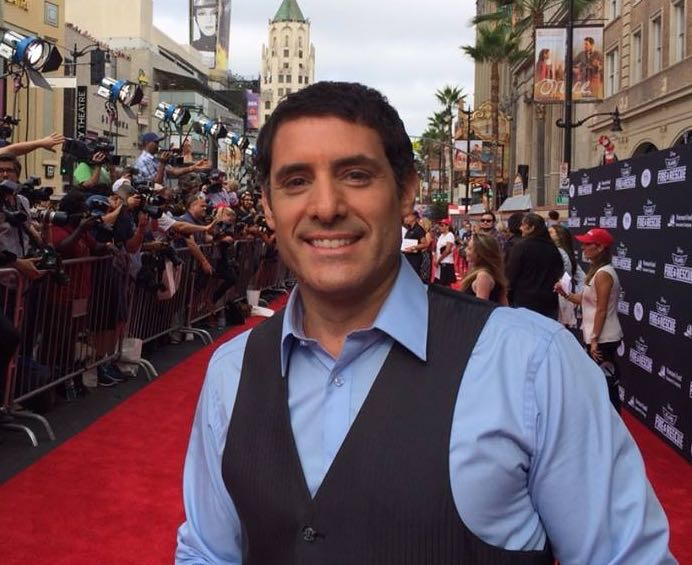
- Pardo at the premiere of Planes: Fire and Rescue (2014).
- Born: 15 November 1971 (age 55); Buenos Aires, Argentina
- Occupation: Actor
- Years active: September 2003 - present
- Height: 5 ft 10 in (1.78 m)

Danny Pardo (born 15 November 1971) is an Argentinian-born movie, TV, and voiceover actor living in Los Angeles. He became an international star in 2015 with his role as Padre Martin in the Argentinian-produced telenovela Entre Canibales (Among Cannibals).

Pardo is perhaps best known in the US for his roles in Planes: Fire & Rescue (2014), Prison Break (2007), and The Shield (2002).

== Biography ==
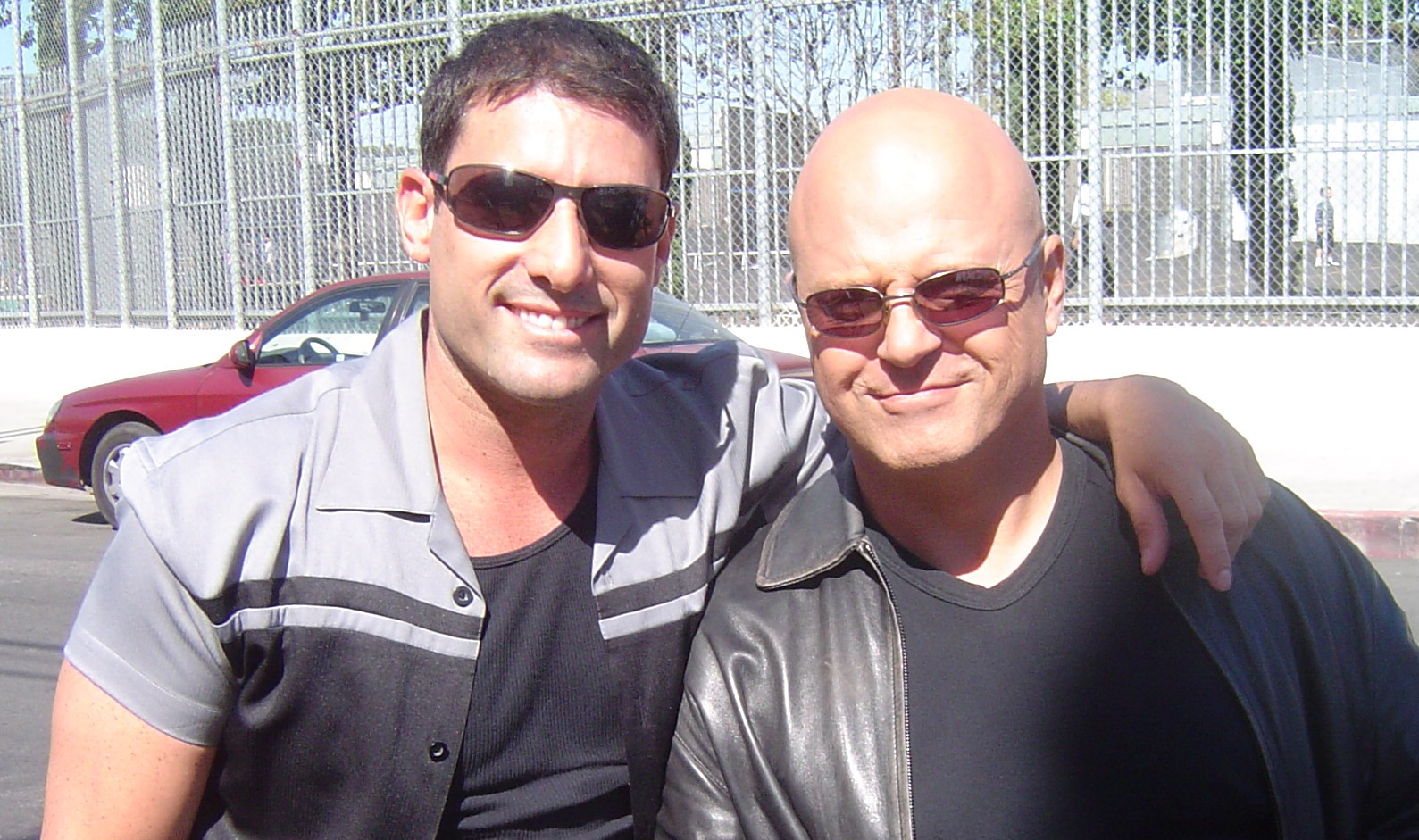
Danny Pardo (age 36) with Michael Chiklis on the set of The Shield (2008).

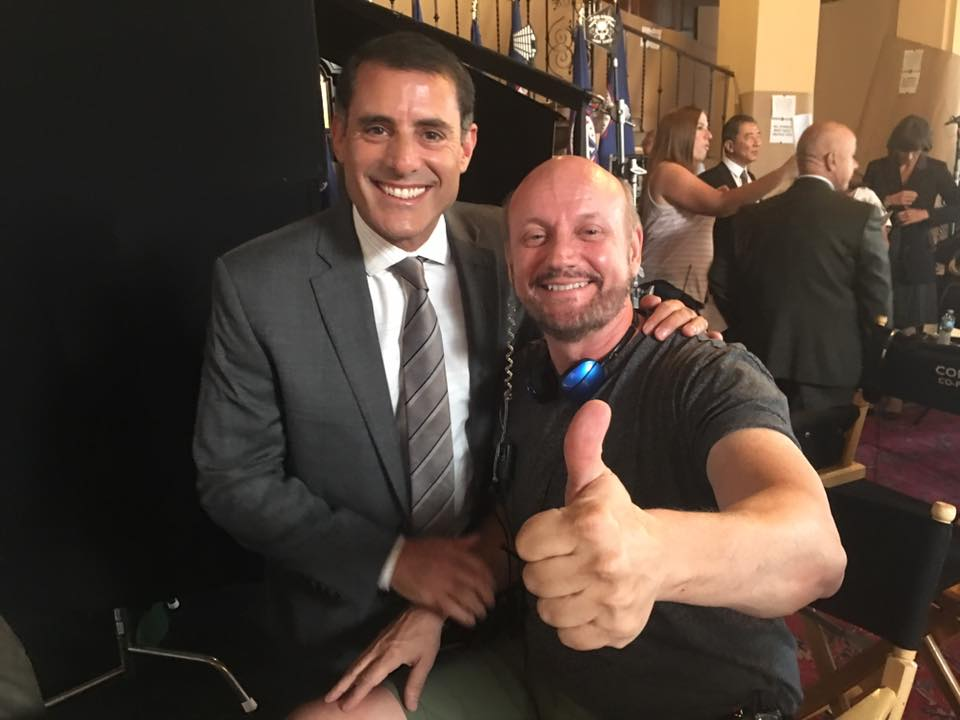
Danny Pardo (age 44) with director Juan Jose Campanella (2016).

Pardo was born in South America, and he can trace his family roots back to Italy, Spain, and Yugoslavia. He received degrees in marketing and business in Argentina before moving to Miami, Florida, United States, in January 2001 to run an import business. In September 2003, he switched to acting, and booked his first commercial, for the Florida lottery, one month later.

After building a strong base in Miami in commercials and as a host on E! Entertainment Latin America's Vidas Bonitas and a reporter for Univision, Pardo moved to Los Angeles in 2005, where his career took off. He landed recurring roles on the hit TV shows Prison Break, 24, and The Shield, as well as the movies Pretty Obsession (2012) and Counterpunch (2014). He speaks Spanish, English, Portuguese, and Italian fluently, and has performed in all of these languages.

Pardo's breakthrough role came in February 2015, when he was cast by Juan Jose Campanella, director of the Oscar winner The Secret in Their Eyes (2010), to play Padre Martin in the hit Argentinian telenovela Entre Canibales. The popularity of the series has made him a star in his native Argentina and throughout South America.

Pardo and Campanella got the chance to work together again when Pardo guest-starred in an episode of the TV show Colony (2017).

Pardo has also done voiceover work for movies, TV, and video games, including The Cleveland Show, Call of Duty: Black Ops II, and Grand Theft Auto V. In 2014, he voiced the character Blackout in Disney's Planes: Fire & Rescue.

== Filmography ==
=== Film ===
| Year | Title | Role | Notes |
|---|---|---|---|
| 2007 | La Vida por un Rato de Placer | Director Medico | |
| 2009 | La Vida Detras de la Puerta | Richard | |
| 2011 | Double Tap | Tito | |
| 2012 | Monte Reve | Eduardo Branco | |
| 2012 | Pretty Obsession | Rebecca's Dad | |
| 2012 | Halloween Party | Cole/Pirate | |
| 2013 | Crosshairs | Acturo | |
| 2013 | Dancing on a Dry Salt Lake | Guido | |
| 2014 | Planes: Fire & Rescue | Blackout (voice) | Cameo |
| 2015 | Violence | Sean | |
| 2015 | The Martial Arts Kid | Officer Vega | |
| 2015 | The Grid: Zombie Outlet Maul | Mane, Utility Supervisor (voice) | |
| 2016 | Sanctuary | Sam | |
| 2017 | Palm Swings | Michael Griffith | |
| 2017 | Ti Amo Speciale | Gianni Conte | Short film |
| 2017 | CounterPunch | Benjamin Portillo | |
| 2019 | 7 Days to Vegas | Sandor | |
| Unreleased | Nicole and O.J. | Geraldo Rivera | Principal photography is incomplete. |

=== Television ===
| Year | Title | Role | Notes |
|---|---|---|---|
| 2004 | Prisionera | Raul | 1 episode |
| 2004-2005 | Anita, No Te Rajes! | Aldo Mangiacavallo | 4 episodes |
| 2005 | Decisiones | Alfredo | 2 episodes |
| 2007 | 24 | CTU Officer | 2 episodes |
| 2007 | Prison Break | Panamanian Commander | 2 episodes |
| 2008 | The Shield | Cartel Driver | 2 episodes |
| 2008 | Hacienda Heights | Father Pascal | 3 episodes |
| 2007-2009 | Secretos | Eduardo/Bruno Roberti | 2 episodes |
| 2009 | Oh La La, I Speak French! | | TV Miniseries |
| 2010 | All My Children | Brazilian Businessman | 1 episode |
| 2011 | Illegal | Don Q | series regular |
| 2011 | Misadventures of the Unemployed | Officer | "Turf Wars" |
| 2011 | No Me Hallo | Richard | series regular |
| 2011 | MID: Murder Investigation Unit | Det. Mario Trujio | series regular |
| 2012 | Girls of Sunset Place | Rocco Verducci | 3 episodes |
| 2012 | Actor's Day in LA | Detective | "Elements of a TV Pilot Pitch" |
| 2012 | Sos mi hombre | Moderator | 1 episode |
| 2013 | Disque Santo Antonio | Antonio Santos | "Ele, o homem perfeito" |
| 2012-2013 | The Cleveland Show | Announcer, Poet (voices) | 2 episodes |
| 2013 | Madame Oola Mystery Series | Lt. Kantanis | TV movie |
| 2013 | Murphy's Law | Roberta | "Natural Woman" |
| 2014 | Oh La La, Hollywood Speaks French! | Pablo de la Barca | series regular |
| 2014 | My Crazy Ex | Priest Antonio | "Gone Viral" |
| 2015 | Deadly Sins | Jose Barco | "Miami Con & Swindle" |
| 2015 | Entre Canibales | Padre Martin | series regular |
| 2016 | Escape the Night | David Santos | "Did Someone Call for an Exorcist?" |
| 2017 | Colony | Argentinian Delegate | 1 episode |
| 2020 | Fast & Furious Spy Racers | Rocha (voice) | 5 episodes |

=== Videogames ===
| Year | Title | Role |
|---|---|---|
| 2012 | Call of Duty: Black Ops II | Additional Voices |
| 2013 | Grand Theft Auto V | Transvestite |
| 2014 | Planes: Fire & Rescue | Blackout |
| 2019 | Jumanji: The Video Game | Smolder Bravestone (Spain) |
| 2020 | Cyberpunk 2077 | Brazilian Thug |
| 2026 | Grand Theft Auto VI | The Local Population |
