= Cash Out (film) =

2024 film by Ives

- Theatrical release poster
- Directed by: Ives
- Written by: Dipo Oseni; Doug Richardson
- Produced by: Joel Cohen; Cecil Chambers
- Starring: John Travolta; Kristin Davis; Lukas Haas; Quavo; Joel Cohen
- Cinematography: Alejandro Lalinde
- Edited by: Marc Fusco
- Music by: Yagmur Kaplan
- Production companies: Convergence Entertainment Group; Highland Film Group; Transparency Media
- Distributed by: Saban Films
- Release date: April 26, 2024
- Running time: 90 minutes
- Country: United States
- Language: English
- Box office: $167,694

Cash Out is a 2024 American action thriller film directed by Ives, written by Dipo Oseni and Doug Richardson, and starring John Travolta, Kristin Davis, Lukas Haas, and Quavo. In this film, Professional thief Mason attempts his biggest heist with his brother, robbing a bank. When it goes wrong, they're trapped inside surrounded by law enforcement. Tension rises as Mason negotiates with his ex-lover, the lead negotiator.

The film was released on April 26, 2024.

== Plot ==
The film begins with Mason and his partner Amelia executing a car theft at a private plane exhibition. After a police chase, Amelia reveals her identity as an undercover FBI agent and impedes the theft. Mason decides to retire.

Three months later, Mason's brother Shawn convinces him to take part in a bank robbery. After taking hostages, Mason and Shawn discover that the bank vault they seek is a trap set by the FBI. Shawn reveals that he and his crew are after a hard drive containing millions of dollars' worth of cryptocurrency. They force the bank manager to open the vault, but it turns out to be a decoy. The manager admits that he doesn't know where the real vault is that contains the hard drive.

As the situation escalates, Mason learns that the vault and the hard drive belonging to crime lord Abel Salazar contains not just the large sum of cryptocurrency but also evidence incriminating high-ranking US officials. Mason decides to use the drive to blackmail the authorities to let his crew escape. The military, under Salazar's direction, demand the hostages be released, but Mason refuses to surrender. He and his crew find Salazar's hidden vault, and Mason's tech person, Link, hacks into it.

Mason releases the hostages two by two, and asks his crew to surrender as well; only he and Link remain in the vault. Mason detonates explosives in the bank, leading everyone to believe he and Link are killed in the explosion.

Amelia resigns from her job. She goes to the island for vacation, and meets Mason there. It turns out that Amelia never betrayed the crew to begin with. The failed car theft was a ruse, to trick the FBI into thinking Amelia was still loyal to the government, so Mason could have a mole within the FBI. During the stand-off in the bank vault, Mason had blackmailed Salazar's lawyer to transfer $500 million to his crew, along with new identities for them. Salazar's lawyer reluctantly agreed, and Mason and his crew retired in luxury from their life of crime.

== Cast ==
- John Travolta as Mason Goddard
- Kristin Davis as Amelia Decker
- Lukas Haas as Shawn Goddard
- Quavo as Anton
- Bernard White as Mr. Perez
- Noel G. as Hector
- Joel Cohen as Vernon Richter
- Natali Yura as Link
- Swen Temmel as Georgios Caras
- Matt Gerald as Captain Fabrizio
- Alex Hurt as Mr. Flowers

== Production ==
Principal photography occurred in Columbus, Georgia in June 2022.

== Release and reception ==
Cash Out was released digitally and in limited theaters by Saban Films on April 26, 2024. As of December 1, 2024, the film grossed $167,694 in South Korea and the United Arab Emirates.

On the review aggregator website Rotten Tomatoes, 20% of 20 critics' reviews are positive, with an average rating of 3.7/10. Metacritic, which uses a weighted average, assigned the film a score of 46 out of 100, based on 6 critics, indicating "mixed or average" reviews.
