= San Francisco City FC =

San Francisco City
- Full name: San Francisco City Football Club
- Nicknames: Fierroyoro (The Iron & Gold)
- Short name: SF City, SF City FC, SFCFC
- Founded: 2001; 25 years ago
- Stadium: Kezar Stadium
- Capacity: 10,000
- Owner(s): 51% San Francisco City FC Members Organization (nonprofit, supporter owned); 49% Private Investors
- Coach: Berdi Merdanov
- League: USL League Two
- 2026: 1st, NorCal Division; Playoffs: 1-1
- Website: sfcityfc.com
Home colors	Away colors	Third colors

San Francisco City Football Club (SFCFC) is a supporter-owned soccer club in San Francisco, California, that competes in USL League Two.

Founded in 2001, SF City plays its home matches at Kezar Stadium. The club has also hosted home matches at Boxer Stadium, Negoesco Stadium and Cox Stadium.

SF City has qualified in 2016 and 2018 for the U.S. Open Cup, the oldest ongoing national soccer competition in the United States.

== History ==
San Francisco City Football Club was founded in 2001 by Jonathan Wright. The club entered the San Francisco Soccer Football League beginning with the 2002 season. After a decade in the competition, the club won back-to-back promotions to reach the SFSFL Premier Division in 2012. On the heels of the club's SFSFL success, and with enthusiasm for soccer mounting in the buildup to the 2014 FIFA World Cup, former SF City player and current club president Jacques Pelham began discussions with members of the San Francisco Football Supporters Association and the San Francisco chapter of The American Outlaws about building a grassroots, supporter-owned professional soccer club in the city.

The club began offering membership in August 2014, but a bid to join the National Premier Soccer League (NPSL) for the spring 2015 campaign was blocked by San Francisco Stompers FC, who claimed territorial exclusivity in the league. SF City filed a grievance with US Soccer contesting the Stompers' claim. An independent arbiter eventually sided with SF City, but by the time the decision was made the club had already agreed to join US Club Soccer's NorCal Premier Soccer League.

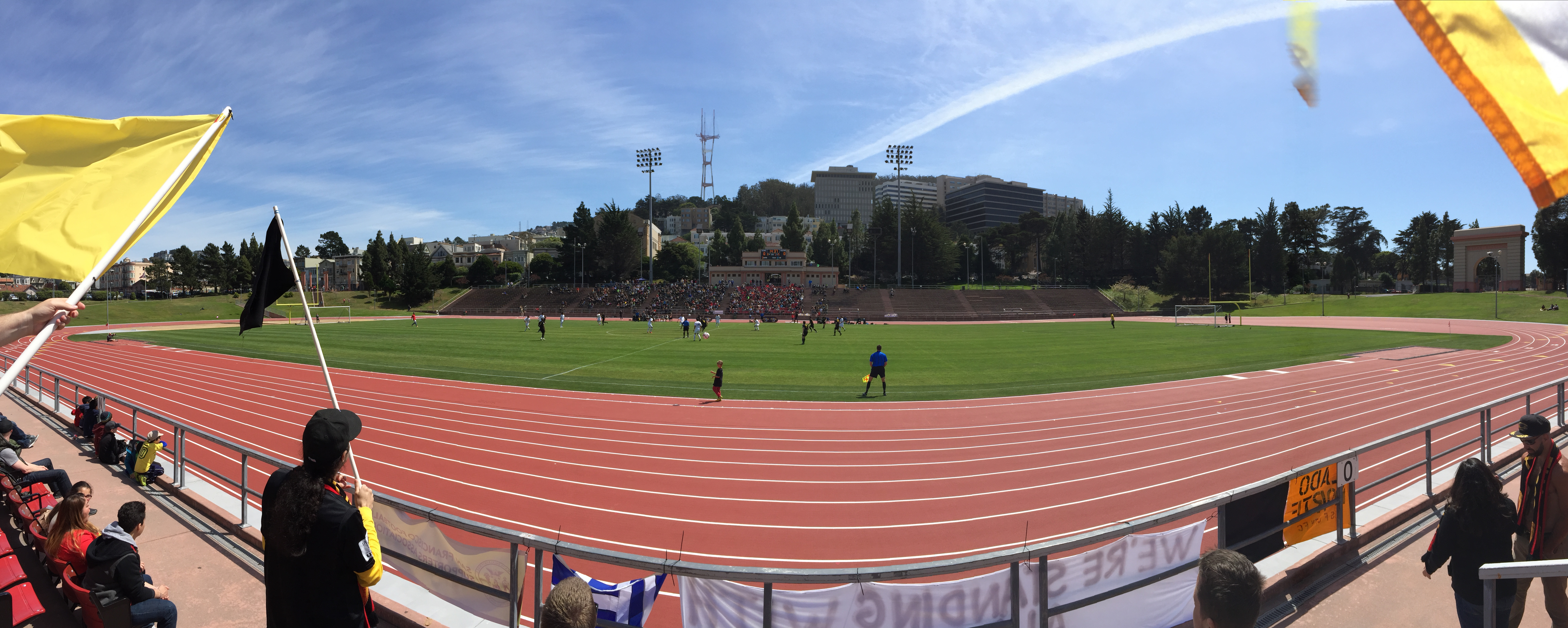
SF City in 2015 US Open Cup action against Cal FC at Kezar Stadium

In early 2015, with administration staff in place and membership on the rise, SF City approached dominant NorCal Premier Soccer League side Ticket Arsenal FC about merging its on-pitch talent, which included many former NCAA Division 1 players and some former Major League Soccer prospects, with SF City's organizational and supporter infrastructure. The merger was executed on the eve of the semifinal of the regional US Open Cup qualifying tournament.

The new-look SF City went on to qualify for the opening round of the US Open Cup. They became the first team from San Francisco to qualify for the competition since the 2007 California Victory, and the first amateur San Francisco side to do so since the reintroduction of professional clubs to the tournament in 1995. The April 25 play-in match between SF City and Cal FC set a US Open Cup preliminary round attendance record, with 1,519 spectators in the stands of the newly refurbished Kezar Stadium.

At the start of the 2016 season, SF City made their debut in the USL's Premier Development League. The club won six and drew two of their fourteen matches in that inaugural season, finishing third in the five-team Central Pacific Division.

For 2017, the club realigned to the Southwest Division. Eight wins and one draw put SF City in third place out of nine teams, just missing qualification for the playoffs.

In 2018, the team entered their second US Open Cup following their strong showing the previous season. At Raimondi Park in Oakland, SF City defeated CD Aguiluchos 4–0 to advance to the second round, where they fell to the USL Championship's Sacramento Republic. The PDL season was uneven, as the team finished sixth in the tightly contested Southwest.

In 2019, the PDL was renamed USL League Two and the Southwest Division shrank to eight teams. SF City finished in sixth place for the second consecutive season.

SF City, in conjunction with the rest of the division, canceled their 2020 season due to the COVID-19 pandemic. The club instead supported charitable causes online. In 2021, the League Two campaign was again called off, leading the club to call greater attention to their team in the SFSFL. That team won ten of their eleven matches to finish atop the Majors Division and earn promotion to the Premier Division in 2022. While the senior team struggled in their first season after quarantine, they have improved by at least four points in every season since.

In 2023, the club announced a kit sponsorship with the San Francisco Municipal Railway, the city's public transit operator.

In 2026, SF City won its first USL2 NorCal championship, clinching first place with a 1-0 win over Project 51O at home to end the regular season. This was followed by the club's first USL2 playoff win, a 1-0 victory over FC Tucson.

== Year-by-year ==
=== Senior team ===
Year	League	Division	Points	Position	Playoffs	US Open Cup
2015	US Club Soccer	NorCal Premier	25	1st	1-1	--
2016	USL PDL	Central Pacific	20	3rd	DNQ	Round 1
2017	USL PDL	Southwest	25	3rd	DNQ	DNQ
2018	USL PDL	Southwest	16	6th	DNQ	Round 2
2019	USL League Two	Southwest	15	6th	DNQ	DNQ
2020	USL League Two	Southwest	Did not play due to COVID-19 pandemic			
2021	USL League Two	Southwest	Did not play due to COVID-19 pandemic			
2022	USL League Two	Southwest	6	8th	DNQ	DNQ
2023	USL League Two	Nor Cal	14	5th	DNQ	DNQ
2024	USL League Two	Nor Cal	18	5th	DNQ	DNQ
2025	USL League Two	Nor Cal	22	4th	DNQ	DNQ
2026	USL League Two	Nor Cal	37	1st	1-1	--

=== Second Team (SFSFL) ===
Year	Division	Points	Position	Notes
2002	First (3rd tier)	--	--	First Season
2003	First (3rd tier)	--	1st	Promoted to Majors Division
2004	Majors (2nd tier)	--	1st	Promoted to Premier Division
2005	Premier (1st tier)	--	1st	Premier Division Champions
2011	First (3rd tier)	46	1st	Promoted to Majors Division
2012	Majors (2nd tier)	42	1st	Promoted to Premier Division
2013	Premier (1st tier)	15	9th	
2014	Premier (1st tier)	32	6th	
2015	Premier (1st tier)	16	11th	
2016	Premier (1st tier)	30	8th	
2017	Premier (1st tier)	29	5th	
2018	Premier (1st tier)	31	7th	
2019	Premier (1st tier)	15	11th	Relegated to Majors Division
2020	Majors (2nd tier)	Season canceled due to COVID-19 pandemic		
2021	Majors (2nd tier)	30*	1st	Promoted to Premier Division
2022	Premier (1st tier)	26	5th	
2023	Premier (1st tier)	20	9th	
2024	Premier (1st tier)	18	10th	
2025	Premier (1st tier)	40	4th	League semifinalist
2026	Premier (1st tier)	--	--	

* Abbreviated season; played opponents only once each

== Ownership and operations ==
SF City is a 51% supporter-owned club, with members paying annual dues in return for home match season tickets, club merchandise (such as the yearly scarf), and voting rights in club matters, including the election of its Members Board of Directors.

In 2016, SF City announced a new round of minority investors:

- Alex Bard, CEO at Campaign Monitor, previously EVP at Salesforce
- Mitch Lowe, angel investor and advisor, previously co-founder and COO at Redbox
- Gary Benitt, General Partner at Social Leverage, previously co-founder and COO at Desk.com
- Ethan Kurzweil, partner at Bessemer Venture Partners
- Scot Chisholm, CEO and co-founder at Classy
- Andy Jones, a fifteen-year veteran in the financial services industry
- Andrew Housser, co-founder and co-CEO of Freedom Financial Network
- András Petery, a tech media executive and investor who led mobile partnerships at Yahoo! and founded Enable Ventures

== Supporters ==
The supporters of SF City are known collectively as "El Lado Norte" or "The Northsiders," as they gather in the north stand at Kezar Stadium during matches. In addition to standing, singing, chanting, waving flags, and displaying tifos during matches, Northsiders frequently gather to socialize, attend or watch away matches, and perform community service. The Northsiders took Supporters Group of the Year honors at USL League Two's Golden Scarf Awards in 2019, and propelled SF City to the title in the league's Fan-Voted Season in 2020. 2025 saw the formation of two additional supporter groups, Kezar Union (for younger fans) and Fault Line Offenders. In 2026, the three groups united under the name La Bahía de Frisco.

== Kits ==
=== Kit history ===
Home and away kits.

- Home

2011	2013	2015	2016	2017	2018–19	2022	2023	2024

2025	2026

- Away

2012	2015	2016	2017	2018	2019	2022	2023	2024

2025	2026

=== Kit sponsors ===
Years	Kit Manufacturer	Kit Sponsors		Pride Kit Charity
2016	Nike	Classy	FreedomPlus	--
2017	Nike	Classy	FreedomPlus, Hostelling International USA	AIDS Legal Referral Panel
2018	Nike	Moviepass	FreedomPlus, Hostelling International USA, Standard Deviant Brewing	AIDS Legal Referral Panel
2019	Nike, Icarus (Pride kit)	FreedomPlus	Hostelling International USA, Standard Deviant Brewing	AGUILAS
2020	Did not play due to COVID-19 pandemic			AGUILAS
2021	Did not play due to COVID-19 pandemic			--
2022	Erreà	FreedomPlus	Standard Deviant Brewing	The Transgender District
2023	Inaria, Olive & York (Pride Kit)	--	--	Sisters of Perpetual Indulgence
2024	Inaria, Icarus (Keeper/Pride)	San Francisco Muni	Humanitix, Hostelling International USA	SF LGBT Center
2025	Meyba	San Francisco Muni	Legend, goodr	Queer LifeSpace
2026	Meyba	San Francisco Muni	--	--
