= MoviePass, MovieCrash =

2024 film

- Official poster
- Directed by: Muta’Ali
- Produced by: Mark Wahlberg; Stephen Levinson; Archie Gips; Jack Heller; Scott Veltri; Jevon Frank; David Wendall
- Cinematography: Axel Baumann
- Edited by: Brian Goetz; Yaniv Elani
- Music by: Max Aruj
- Production companies: HBO Documentary Films; Unrealistic Ideas; Assemble Media; Nightbrain Pictures; Tower Way
- Distributed by: HBO
- Release dates: March 9, 2024 (SXSW); May 29, 2024 (United States)
- Running time: 96 minutes
- Country: United States
- Language: English

MoviePass, MovieCrash is a 2024 American documentary film directed by Muta’Ali. It explores the rise, fall and resurrection of movie subscription service MoviePass.

It had its world premiere at South by Southwest on March 9, 2024, and was released on May 29, 2024 on HBO.

== Plot ==
Explores the rise, fall and resurrection of movie subscription service MoviePass under the leadership of Ted Farnsworth and CEO Mitch Lowe alongside the expensive parties, the co-founders Stacy Spikes and Hamet Watt, both African American, being pushed out of the company by Farnsworth and the production of the infamous 2018 film Gotti under MoviePass Ventures.

== Production ==
In February 2021, it was announced a documentary series revolving around MoviePass was in development, by Mark Wahlberg and set to produce under his Unrealistic Ideas banner.

== Release ==
It had its world premiere at South by Southwest on March 9, 2024. It was released on HBO and Max on May 29, 2024.

== Reception ==
On the review aggregator website Rotten Tomatoes, 88% of 24 critics' reviews are positive. The website's consensus reads: "MoviePass, MovieCrash cleverly unpacks the service's collapse, blending a gripping history with sharp commentary on racial inequality in business." Metacritic, which uses a weighted average, assigned the film a score of 71 out of 100, based on eight critics, indicating "generally favorable" reviews.

Rendy Jones of Rendy Reviews gave the film four out of five stars, writing: "Strengthened by its commentary about racial inequality in Black entrepreneurship and white privilege, MoviePass, MovieCrash is an eye-opening history lesson behind the subscription service designed to be great but co-opted to fail."

Clint Worthington of RogerEbert.com gave it two and a half out of four stars and wrote, "Credit to Muta'Ali for finding an interesting angle on the material, which, ultimately, is about the rise and fall of a scrappy startup business—hardly the most cinematic of subjects, even if movies lie at the core of its business model. See, while we're used to stories of venture capital ghouls and unchecked capitalist greed taking down even the most well-intentioned businesses, MoviePass recognizes its uniquely tragic nature as a cautionary tale for entrepreneurial racism: The story of two idealistic Black founders, their sensible idea for a buzzworthy company, and the greedy, old, white investors who stole it from them and spent it into the ground within a year."
