= Housser =

Housser is a surname. Notable people with the surname include:

- Andrew Housser (born 1973), American informatic entrepreneur
- Sally Housser (fl. 2024), Canadian politician in Saskatchewan
- Yvonne McKague Housser (1897–1996), Canadian Modernist painter
