= Moviefone =

Movie listing service

Moviefone Media LLC
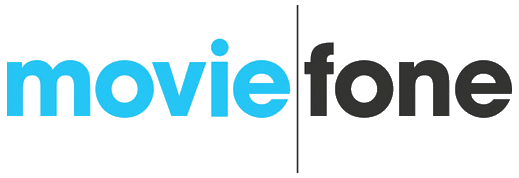
- Trade name: Moviefone
- Company type: Subsidiary
- Founded: 1989; 37 years ago
- Founders: Rob Gukeisen; Andrew Jarecki; Henry Jarecki; Russ Leatherman; Adam Slutsky
- Headquarters: United States
- Services: Online media, movie theatre information, movie tickets
- Parent: AOL (1999–2018); Helios and Matheson Analytics (2018–2020); Born in Cleveland LLC (2020–present)
- Website: moviefone.com

Moviefone is an American-based movie listing and information service. Moviegoers can obtain local showtimes, cinema information, film reviews, and advance tickets, as well as TV content and a comprehensive search tool that allows users to find theaters, channels, and streaming services offering movies and television shows. The service is owned by Born in Cleveland LLC, Cleveland O'Neal III's holding company. O'Neal is creator and producer of Made in Hollywood syndicated daytime entertainment show.

== History ==
In 1987, in Manhattan Beach, CA, Doug Hoitenga conceived the idea and business model for moviefone, and shortly thereafter compiled a founding team. In 1989, Doug Hoitenga, along with Russ Leatherman, Rob Gukeisen, Andrew Jarecki, Pat Cardamone, and Adam Slutsky launched the interactive telephone service, with initial service in Los Angeles and New York City. Leatherman provided the voice of "Mr. Moviefone" for the automated phone service. After gaining popularity, the service later expanded across the United States and eventually adopted an online presence as Moviefone.com.

In 1999, AOL purchased Moviefone for $388 million. The acquisition was completed on May 21, 1999.

In 2001, Moviefone entered into a partnership with MovieTickets.com that crosslinked their ticketing offerings; by 2004, Moviefone's online arm was acquired outright by MovieTickets.com. However, in 2012, Moviefone announced a partnership with MovieTickets.com's rival Fandango.

On February 23, 2014, it was reported that Moviefone would be shutting down its call-in service and its "777-FILM" phone number, but would maintain its mobile app services.

On May 5, 2014, Moviefone was relaunched with a new look, an expansion into TV content, and a comprehensive search tool that allows users to find theaters, channels, and streaming services offering movies and television shows.

On April 5, 2018, Helios and Matheson Analytics, the majority owner of the movie ticketing service MoviePass, announced the acquisition of Moviefone from Oath Inc. for $1 million in cash and $8 million in stock.

In early 2020, Helios and Matheson went bankrupt in deep controversy over multiple changes to the MoviePass service, and at that point had one employee, Matt Atchity, handling Moviefone. The company was worth just $4,379,504, or about 1% of the 388 million when it was purchased by AOL. Made in Hollywood Producer Cleveland O’Neal III purchased Moviefone out of bankruptcy in March 2020 via his holding company, Born in Cleveland LLC.

== In popular culture ==
In the Seinfeld episode, "The Pool Guy" (season 7, episode 8), the character Cosmo Kramer receives misdialed calls meant for a parodied Moviefone after getting a new phone number.

In an episode of the TV series of Dilbert, the Pointy-haired Boss confuses Moviefone with an automated hotline for checking his stocks, being frustrated that trying to check his IBM stock leads to buying tickets to a horror movie.

In the Family Guy episode "I Dream of Jesus", Marlee Matlin attempts to call Moviefone in order to hear showtimes for The Last Mimzy, but ends up purchasing tickets to 300 because of her impaired speech.

In the 2001 film Josie and the Pussycats, Mr. Moviefone is the voice of subliminal advertising messages planted into pop music by an ominous record agency.

In the 2023 film Beau Is Afraid, Moviefone can be seen in a shot of Beau's recently called contacts.
