= American Animals =

2018 UK/US heist film

- Theatrical release poster
- Directed by: Bart Layton
- Written by: Bart Layton
- Produced by: Derrin Schlesinger; Katherine Butler; Dimitri Doganis; Mary Jane Skalski
- Starring: Evan Peters; Barry Keoghan; Blake Jenner; Jared Abrahamson; Udo Kier; Ann Dowd
- Cinematography: Ole Bratt Birkeland
- Edited by: Nick Fenton; Chris Gill; Julian Hart
- Music by: Anne Nikitin
- Production companies: AI Film; Film4 Productions; RAW; Lava Bear Films
- Distributed by: The Orchard; MoviePass Ventures (United States); STXinternational (United Kingdom)
- Release dates: January 19, 2018 (Sundance); June 1, 2018 (United States); September 7, 2018 (United Kingdom)
- Running time: 116 minutes
- Countries: United Kingdom; United States
- Language: English
- Box office: $4.1 million

American Animals is a 2018 docudrama heist film written and directed by Bart Layton. Starring Evan Peters, Barry Keoghan, Blake Jenner, Jared Abrahamson, and Ann Dowd, it is an account of the Transylvania University book heist in Lexington, Kentucky in 2004. The film cuts between interview segments of the real-life people involved in the heist and actors playing out the same events.

American Animals premiered at the 2018 Sundance Film Festival on January 19, 2018. The film was theatrically released in the United States on June 1, 2018, by The Orchard and MoviePass Ventures. Among other awards the film won the Junior Jury Award at The Montclair Film Festival. It received generally favorable reviews from critics, particularly for its screenplay, acting, use of unreliable narrators, and an unconventional storytelling structure that fused real-life characters and actors representing those characters.

== Plot ==
Spencer Reinhard, an art student seeking excitement or tragedy for inspiration, is given a tour of Transylvania University library's rare-book collection; his eye is drawn to a rare first edition of John James Audubon's Birds of America. He and his friend Warren Lipka, a rebellious student on an athletic scholarship at the University of Kentucky, discuss the possibility of stealing it and other rare books. They note that the collection is guarded by only one librarian, whom they believe they could easily overpower before stealing the books and escaping via the staff elevator. Warren travels to Amsterdam to meet black-market buyers who express interest, informing Spencer they could make millions. They later enlist the help of two friends: Eric Borsuk to provide logistics and Chas Allen as the getaway driver.

They make an appointment for a private viewing of the collection in order to gain access to the room, and arrive disguised as elderly businessmen; but they abort the heist when Warren sees multiple librarians in the room. Spencer wants to abandon the plan, but Warren persuades him and the others to try again the next day. Spencer acts as a lookout as Warren and Eric, without disguises, enter the library. Warren clumsily uses a stun gun on the librarian, making Eric help restrain her. They blunder to the exit, dropping The Birds of America, but escape with two books.

The group travels to Christie's auction house in New York to get the authentication of value Warren said the Dutch buyers required. Spencer is told he has to return the next day and leaves his cell phone number with an assistant. Chas berates Spencer for using a phone number that can be identified as his, and they return to Lexington with the books. Shortly after, Spencer realizes the police will also be able to trace the email address they used to make the appointments with Christie's and the library; the FBI eventually does, and they are arrested.

In documentary interviews with the real-life thieves filmed years after they are released from prison, they express regret. Spencer suspects Warren lied about going to Amsterdam in order to convince the others to partake in the heist. Eric and Chas now live in California as a writer and a fitness coach, respectively; Warren studies filmmaking in Philadelphia; and Spencer lives in Lexington as an artist.

== Cast ==
- Evan Peters as Warren Lipka
- Barry Keoghan as Spencer Reinhard
- Blake Jenner as Chas Allen III
- Jared Abrahamson as Eric Borsuk
- Udo Kier as Mr. Van Der Hoek
- Ann Dowd as Betty Jean Gooch

Warren Lipka, Spencer Reinhard, Chas Allen, Eric Borsuk and Betty Jean Gooch all appear as themselves, along with Reinhard's parents, Allen's mother, Lipka's father, and one of the culprits' teachers.

Additionally, Gary Basaraba and Lara Grice portray Warren's parents, Jane McNeill portrays Spencer's mother, and Whitney Goin portrays Chas's mother. Wayne Duvall appears as Coach Bill Welton.

== Production ==
Filming began in Charlotte, North Carolina, in February 2017. Many of the scenes were filmed on campus at Davidson College. The title comes from Eric Borsuk's memoir, which derives its name from a passage in On the Origin of Species, one of the books stolen by the gang, about animals dwelling in the cave systems of Kentucky; this quote is featured at the beginning of the film.

The film blurs elements of fiction and documentary, with the real-life versions of people depicted occasionally appearing alongside the actors in scripted scenes, and different versions of the same scene shown to reflect different accounts of events by the participants.

== Soundtrack ==
The score and themes were composed by Anne Nikitin. Other songs include:

- Devil In Me - 22-20s
- Sound of da Police - KRS-One
- Free Animal - Foreign Air
- In Cold Blood - Alt-J Baauer remix
- Hurdy Gurdy Man - Donovan
- A Little Less Conversation - JXL Radio Edit Remix
- Breathe and Stop - Q-Tip
- Red Balloon - Tim Hardin
- Bullet in the Head - Rage Against the Machine
- Definition - Black Star
- D.R.E.A.M. - Pharoahe Monch, Talib Kweli
- What It's Worth - Black Milk
- Ms. Fat Booty - Mos Def
- Here Come the Nice - Small Faces
- Carbona Not Glue – The Ramones
- Runnin' - The Pharcyde
- NY State of Mind - Nas
- Are You Satisfied? - Reignwolf
- Shook Ones (Part II) - Mobb Deep
- It Was a Good Day - Ice Cube
- They Reminisce Over You (T.R.O.Y.) - Pete Rock
- When I B On tha Mic - Rakim
- Shark Fin Blues - The Drones
- Vitamin C - Can
- New York Groove - Ace Frehley
- Peace Frog - The Doors
- I'm Alive - Johnny Thunder
- Who By Fire - Leonard Cohen
- Crucify Your Mind - Rodriguez

== Release ==
It premiered at the 2018 Sundance Film Festival on January 19, 2018. The film's distribution rights were purchased by The Orchard and MoviePass Ventures for US$3 million. It was released on June 1, 2018.

=== Box office ===
In its opening weekend the film made US$140,629 from four theaters (an average of US$35,157), finishing 24th. According to their own reports, MoviePass members made up 25–35% of the film's opening weekend audience. Speaking about American Animals, as well as MoviePass Ventures' other film Gotti, one independent studio head told Deadline Hollywood: "It used to be in distribution, we'd all gossip whether a studio was buying tickets to their own movie to goose their opening. But in the case of MoviePass, there's no secret: They're literally buying the tickets to their own movie!"

=== Critical response ===
On Rotten Tomatoes, the film holds an approval rating of 88% based on 215 reviews, and an average rating of 7.6/10. The website's critical consensus reads, "American Animals tangles with a number of weighty themes, but never at the expense of delivering a queasily compelling true crime thriller." On Metacritic, the film has a weighted average score of 68 out of 100, based on 40 critics, indicating "generally favorable" reviews.

Robert Abele of TheWrap wrote that the film was "refreshing" in how it showed "the reality of bad decisions and corrosive entitlement." He thought that the film was ethical in not giving "undue attention to the fortune-seeking escapades of the already fortunate": it "wants to leave you wondering about how we tell stories, and whose we tell, rather than simply satisfied you saw one told well." Tom Russo of The Boston Globe liked how the film "palpably, potently conveys the group's misgivings, their jangling nerves, the foolhardy resignation pushing them on despite themselves", yet was disappointed it did not have "even more of its stylish opening symbolism." Katie Walsh of the Chicago Tribune wrote that the film was "an Escher-esque labyrinth where documentary meets narrative filmmaking, then collides, twists and keeps climbing." She liked how it became a "dark distillation of this white, millennial, American male crisis of the self." Walsh added that "when the real Betty Jean finally gets to speak, it’s a clarion call."

== Accolades ==
Layton won the Special Jury Prize at the Deauville American Film Festival and won Best Screenplay from the Writers' Guild of Great Britain. At the British Independent Film Awards, American Animals won for Best Debut Screenwriter and Best Editing. At the Montclair Film Festival, the film won the Junior Jury Award. The film also received an Independent Spirit Award nomination for Best Editing.
