= Sinemia =

Social platform and subscription-based service for film tickets

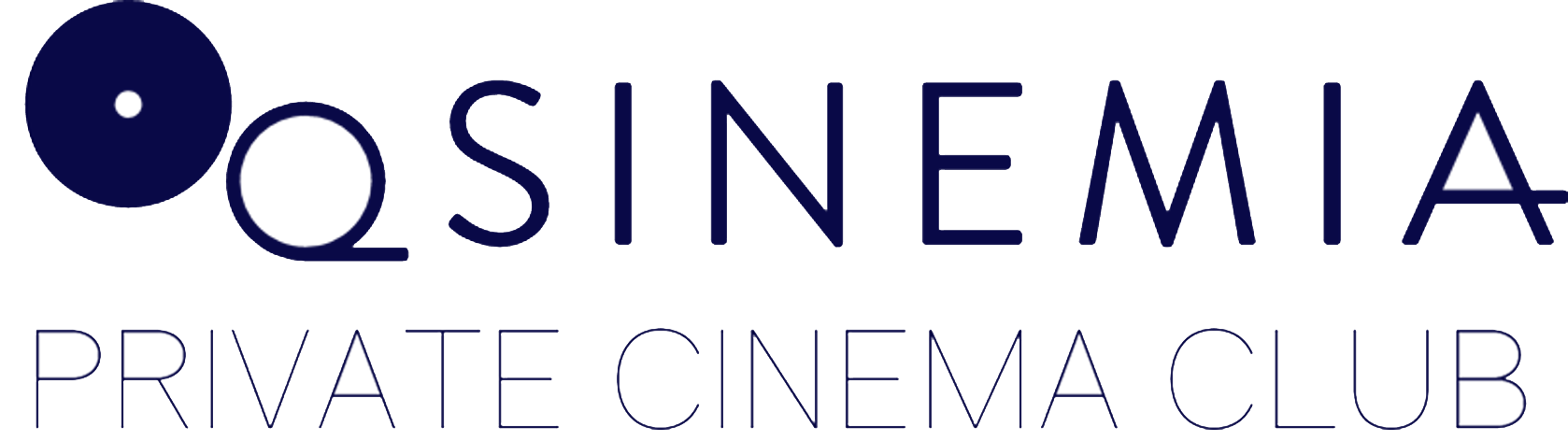
- Industry: Technology
- Founded: 2014
- Founder: Rıfat Oğuz (CEO)
- Defunct: 2019
- Headquarters: Los Angeles
- Website: https://www.sinemia.com (archived)

Sinemia was a subscription-based service for discounted movie-ticket plans. Sinemia advertised a variety of subscription types, including those allowing users to watch movies in every format available (2D – 3D – IMAX – 4DX – DBOX – ScreenX) at any movie theater with no limitation on the dates or movie showtimes, however the service was plagued with problems. Sinemia was the only international movie-ticket subscription service that operated in the UK, Canada, Turkey, and Australia alongside the US. Sinemia ceased operations in the US on April 26, 2019.

The company stated it was the subject of a pending FTC investigation in its US bankruptcy filing, and a class-action lawsuit was filed against Sinemia over fees. Sinemia also came under fire for requiring its users to provide photo identification, social security numbers and other personal information, termination of subscriber accounts without apparent cause as well as app errors which many believed were intentionally designed to slow use of the app, and that the company was able to selectively "fix" on a subscriber-by-subscriber basis depending upon how widely and frequently such customers complained on Twitter and other platforms.

== Service ==
The Sinemia app could be downloaded on iPhone, Android and Windows Phone devices. Upon purchase of a plan, a user's Sinemia membership began. However an activation period of ten days applied before users could use the service by choosing their preferred movie and theater in the Sinemia app, unless users paid an additional fee to start using the service right away. The app provided virtual credit card numbers members could use to purchase movie tickets online, however convenience fees charged by services like Atom and Fandango would be charged to the member's credit card separately.

Sinemia's “Rollover” feature allowed users to roll over unused movie ticket credits to the next month. The feature was applicable for both one-person plans and family plans.

In March 2019, Sinemia introduced and heavily promoted the “Sinemia Limitless” feature, which claimed to allow users to purchase tickets with a one-time payment at the location of their choosing without using the Sinemia app. This feature promised an option for movie goers who prefer not getting involved in subscriptions but charged a hefty $49.95 initiation fee, and up to a $19.95 card activation fee, and many users claimed their memberships were not activated until many weeks after their purchase.

Despite Sinemia previously calling competitor Moviepass's "Unlimited plan" unsustainable, Sinemia nonetheless introduced its own Unlimited plan in the US, UK, Canada, and Australia in 2018, which claimed to allow users to watch a movie every day with their membership.

== Additional Features ==
Advance Ticket Feature

Sinemia developed a feature allowing customers to buy movie tickets online in advance of the show date, however its service fees (above and beyond the monthly cost advertised) became the source of much controversy (see section below).

Sinemia Social

Sinemia Social was a content platform for movie-related content such as news and specially curated movie lists, and they planned to offer a database for actors, actresses, trailers, and movies.

== History ==
- In 2014, Sinemia was founded by entrepreneur Rıfat Oğuz.
- In 2016, Sinemia received an investment from 500 Startups and raised $1.5M for its initial US expansion led by Revo Capital.
- In 2018, Sinemia announced the Unlimited plan in the UK, US, Canada, and Australia, allowing the users to watch a movie every day.
- In October 2018, movie-ticket subscription company Sinemia announced it would begin to offer its tech to movie theaters so they could craft their own personalized subscription plans through its software platform, Sinemia Enterprise.
- In January 2019, Sinemia introduced the Rollover feature.
- In March 2019, Sinemia introduced the “Limitless” feature.
- On April 19, 2019, Sinemia faced a second class action lawsuit. This lawsuit claimed the company terminated user accounts for no reason and did not offer any type of refund.
- On April 24, 2019, Bloomberg reported that Sinemia was considering closing down its subscription service to focus more attention on creating similar programs for theater chains, according to sources familiar with the matter.
- On April 26, 2019 the company posted a letter on its website indicating that it will be "closing its doors and ending operations in the US effective immediately."
- On April 27, 2019 the company declared bankruptcy and confirmed that it is under FTC investigation.

== Controversy ==
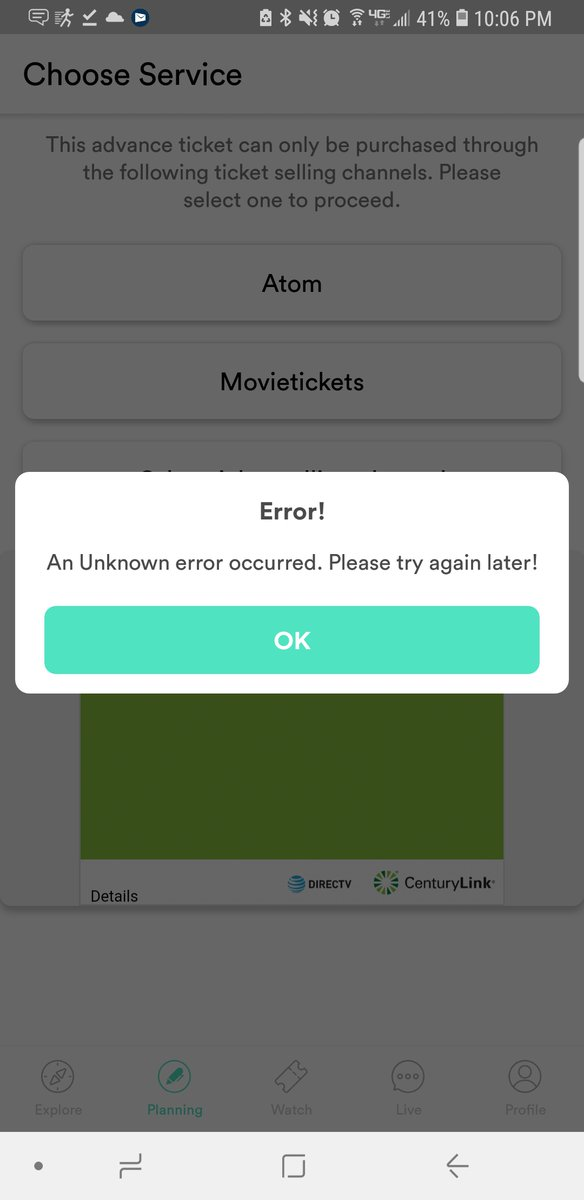
Error message commonly experienced by Sinemia app users

FTC Investigation

On April 27, 2019, Sinemia confirmed that it was under "pending" Federal Trade Commission investigation. While the FTC would neither confirm nor deny the investigation, the FTC's role in "stopping unfair, deceptive or fraudulent practices in the marketplace" matches many of the complaints logged by users.

Class-Action Lawsuit

In November 2018, a class-action lawsuit was filed against Sinemia alleging a "bait and switch" scheme over a new $1.80 per ticket processing fee charged to customers who had prepaid annual memberships. "[Sinemia] lures consumers in by convincing them to purchase a purportedly cheaper movie subscription, and then adds undisclosed fees that make such purchases no bargain at all," the lawsuit claims. "Sinemia fleeces consumers with an undisclosed, unexpected, and not-bargained-for processing fee each time a plan subscriber goes to the movies using Sinemia's service." The lawsuit was amended in February 2019 to include more plaintiffs across 10 states.

Photo ID Demands, "Exit Scam" Behavior and Privacy Concerns

Beginning late February 2019, customers found themselves unable to use the Sinemia app along with a message that Sinemia needed a copy of a driver's license, passport or other photo ID to "prevent fraud." In some cases, Sinemia required two forms of ID leading to speculation about the company's motivation. In many cases, once the company obtained the photo ID, passport, etc. the accounts were soon terminated. Those who refused to provide photo identification were barred from using the service with no refund, thus leaving many compelled to provide their personal identification documents despite how unusual and invasive the demand was. Some have noted that Sinemia at the time was acting as an "exit scam" in which they collect private information for sale on the dark web, and quickly cease operations and disappear. Within 60 days Sinemia announced that they were ceasing US operations, leaving customers exceptionally concerned about the fate of their photo ID, credit card information, and other personal information included date of birth, and in some cases social security numbers.

Account Terminations

In early March 2019, customers began reporting that their accounts were being terminated with no reason being given for the terminations. Despite outcry from many of those terminated that there was no misuse or fraud on their part, Sinemia claimed that it "has uncovered more than a thousand variations of fraud and has improved its fraud detection systems accordingly" and that it "detected fraudulent activities by a number of users whose memberships have been subsequently terminated due to violation of the Terms of Service." Many noted that they were terminated after the company updated their app to request "tips" when customers attempted to purchase movie tickets and once they refused to tip, their service was terminated. Sinemia subsequently offered partial refunds to customers "based on the difference between what you’ve paid to Sinemia and your spending which also includes the cost of the tickets you have received through your Sinemia membership," which for most users who were terminated ended up being zero, leading some users to speculate that the company terminated users that it was beginning to lose money on. The company claims that it has only removed 3% of user accounts since early March due to fraudulent activity, though it has provided no hard data to back up this claim. Publications such as Business Insider noted that they alone had received hundreds of complaints from customers on Sinemia problems, and many other sites reporting the "fraud" claims have dozens or hundreds of comments from irate terminated users, suggesting that the "3%" claim is highly understated. A survey conducted in the private Sinemia Chatter Facebook group (with 284 members total) showed that fully 80% effectively had their accounts or service effectively terminated, whether through outright account termination, account termination followed by reinstatement quickly followed by error messages, or unusual error message completely preventing the ability to use the app. One user termed this latter condition, "soft termination," a way to kick off users and stop them from seeing their allotted movies without the affront of a "fraud" accusation that was yielding Sinemia so much bad press.

Account Reinstatements

Following the outcry of users who claim they were terminated despite following all of the rules, Sinemia began selectively reinstating those accounts of the most vocal complainers, particular those posting about Sinemia's business practices on social media. This was very quickly followed by unusual and never-before-seen app errors (see "Sinemia App Issues, below)

Sinemia App Issues

In March 2019, Sinemia users began reporting problems with the company's app. Complaints ranged from the inability to purchase tickets due to error messages within the app, to not being able to check in via the app when seeing the movie as required under the company's terms of service. One common error message was termed the "Error OK" message due to the placement of a single "Error" word and the OK button beneath it (see photo). Many reported this problem had been happening for days and weeks, and that the response to customer service inquiries was either slow, unhelpful, or non-existent, with some cancelling their subscriptions due to the lack of assistance with the app's problems. The app currently holds a 2.5/5 rating on Google Play and 1.1/5 on iTunes.

Terms-of-Service Changes

In April 2019, it was reported that Sinemia had changed its terms of service to prevent users from bringing or participating in any class-action lawsuit against the company.

== IndieWire Interview ==
On April 2, 2019, IndieWire published an interview with Sinemia CEO Rifat Oguz which the interviewer described as "at times, contentious." When asked about the problems users experience with the app, Oguz stated, "The technology is always updated, currently we are updating almost every two days… so people always need to update and not use the outdated version," while also theorizing about some of the users who were unable to purchase tickets, "If you were a terminated user, you can’t use your app... Maybe they’re terminated but they don’t know that." Responding to reports of poor customer service, Oguz claimed, "We also increased our employee number maybe 30 percent this year, maybe 40 percent, so we’re growing and we’re advancing with increasing our customer support, increasing our team." When asked about the issue of requiring photo IDs from its users, he stated that this information "only stays 24 hours in our system" and promised that this information would not be shared, while also attributing the need for photo IDs to "the fraud that we are facing." When asked about the termination of user accounts with no reason offered for the terminations, Oguz stated, "We can of course try to do more, but right now, we need to fight the frauds to actually maintain the business."

== See also ==
- MoviePass
