= Stacy Spikes =

American film producer

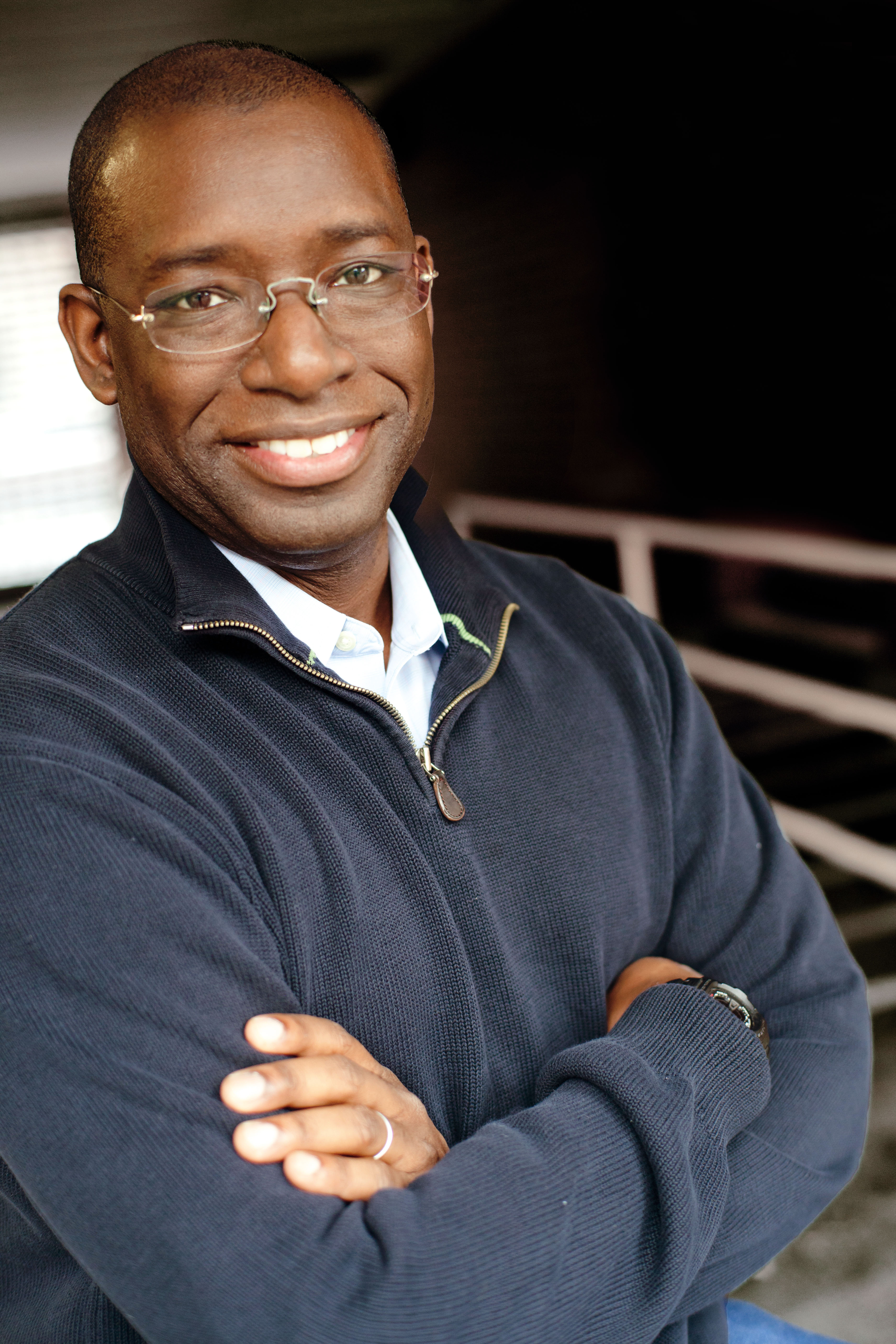
- Born: Houston, Texas, U.S.
- Occupations: CEO and Co-Founder, MoviePass
- Organization: MoviePass

Stacy Spikes is an American entrepreneur and inventor. He holds several business and technical patents. He is the co-founder of the subscription service MoviePass and founder of Urbanworld, an international festival dedicated to nurturing women and BIPOC storytellers and creators. A former film marketing executive and producer, Spikes has had senior executive roles at Motown Records, Sony Music Entertainment, Miramax Films, and October Films.

== Life and career ==
Spikes is from Houston. His father was a school principal, and his mother hosted a public-access TV show.

After high school, he relocated to Los Angeles, where he lived with an uncle and worked in a blue-collar job before getting his first job in the entertainment industry at Motown Records. By 1995, Spikes was working at Miramax Films and had been promoted a number of times, becoming the vice president of marketing. By 1996–97, Spikes was senior vice president of marketing at October Films.

=== Urbanworld Film Festival ===
Spikes founded Urbanworld Film Festival in 1997. The festival celebrated its 25th anniversary in 2021; it is held annually in New York City.

=== MoviePass, Co-Founder ===
In February 2011 Spikes launched MoviePass along with co-founder Hamet Watt. In October 2012, the company introduced a new business model which used proprietary location-based payment technology. Robert De Niro was an early supporter of MoviePass. After it was acquired by Helios and Matheson Analytics, Spikes was fired from the company in January 2018. MoviePass filed for bankruptcy in 2020.

=== MoviePass, Relaunch ===
In 2021, Spikes bought the company out of bankruptcy and relaunched it in the fall of 2022. Approximately 30,000 people registered on the pre-launch waitlist within five minutes of the announcement, causing the MoviePass website to crash. The new iteration of MoviePass has three subscriber tiers: basic, standard, or premium. The Financial Times commented: "In the roll call of terrible business ideas, MoviePass ranks alongside the Sinclair C5, Juicero, and The Soup Tube."

=== Book ===
Stacy Spikes's memoir Black Founder, The Hidden Power of Being an Outsider was published in February 2023; it chronicles his career.

=== Filmography ===
Spikes was the executive producer for Punks, The Visit, King of the Jungle, Higher Ed (2001), For da Love of Money (2002), and the TV movie Urbanworld Film Festival Special (2004).

=== Awards & Honors ===
He received a “Made in NY Award” from Michael Bloomberg, the mayor of New York City, in 2011 for his work with the Urbanworld Film Festival.
