= Bradford Stroh =

American entrepreneur

- Born: May 5, 1973 (age 53); Chicago, United States
- Occupations: Businessman, entrepreneur
- Known for: Achieve Company, Freedom Financial Network and Bills.com
- Spouse: Brandy Stroh
- Children: 2

Bradford G. Stroh is an American entrepreneur and businessman, who has founded and led several companies, and also an author. Stroh co-founded Achieve Company and several related specialty finance businesses.

== Early life and education ==
Stroh was born in 1973 in Chicago and received his MBA from Stanford Business School, where he was an Arjay Miller Scholar. He previously obtained a BA from Amherst College, where he captained the men's Lacrosse team.

== Career ==
Prior to founding Achieve, Stroh was an investor in financial services and growth companies at TA Associates, a private equity fund, CIVC Partners, an investment fund, and Doll Capital Management, a venture capital firm. Stroh has also worked with two start-ups: Trigo Technologies (sold to IBM) and Luminous Networks, a Gigabit Ethernet startup. He is an investor, board adviser and board member to several entrepreneurial companies, including Ujogo, BioIQ, Goldline International, Position2, SharesPost, Stream Dynamics, Realty Nation, Vertical Brands, Group Card, Home-Account and Vitality Health (sold to CarePayments Technology,).

In 2002, Stroh and his business partner Andrew Housser founded the company to provide a full range of specialty financial services to U.S. consumers. The company employs approximately 2,800 people.

Stroh also wrote the fictional novel The Dharma King about Tibetan Buddhism and the search for the Panchen Lama.

== Recognition ==
- 2008 Winner of the Ernst & Young Entrepreneurs of the Year for the Northern California region
- Named to the Silicon Valley/San Jose Business Journal's "40 Under 40" list

== Personal life ==
Brad is of German descent. Brad is married to Brandy Stroh and they have 2 kids Brooke and Brayden. They currently live in San Francisco Bay Area. Brad sits on several boards and advisory councils, including USA Lacrosse Foundation Board and the Amherst College President’s Council.
