= Andrew Housser =

Businessman

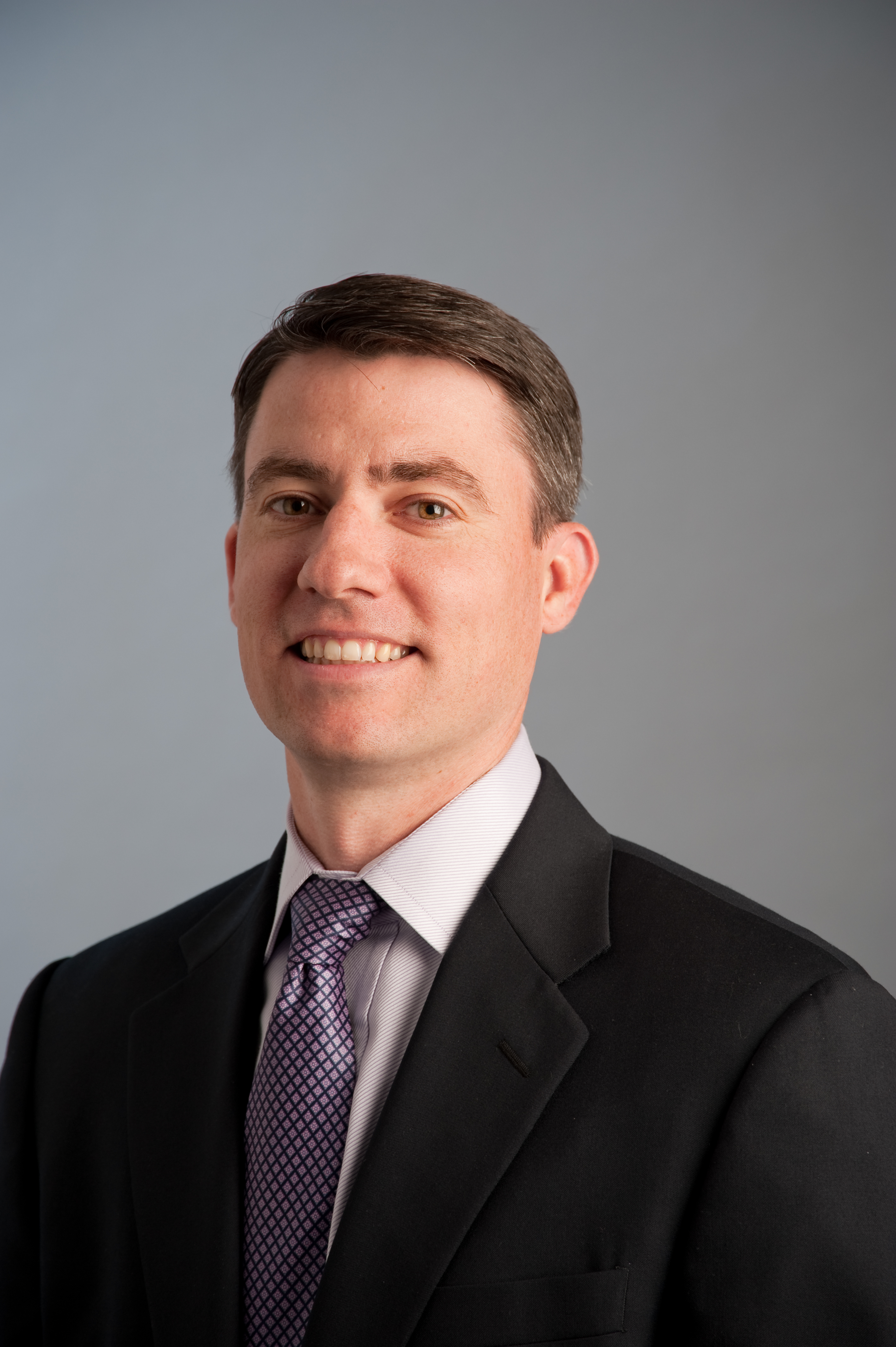
- Born: August 9, 1973 (age 53); Vancouver, Canada
- Occupation: Businessman
- Known for: Achieve Company; Freedom Financial Network; Freedom Debt Relief; Bills.com

Andrew Housser is an entrepreneur who co-founded Achieve (formerly Freedom Financial Network), and who co-founded Bills.com.

== Education ==
Housser attended Brentwood College School in Mill Bay, Canada. Housser received his MBA from Stanford Business School, where he was an Arjay Miller Scholar, and received a BA from Dartmouth College, where he graduated summa cum laude, and was a member of the Phi Beta Kappa honor society. Housser is on the Board of Advisors of the Magnuson Center for Entrepreneurship at Dartmouth College, serves on the board of Brentwood College School and previously served on the Phillips Brooks School board for six years.

== Career ==
Prior to founding Achieve, Housser was an investor in a variety of services, manufacturing, and distribution companies at Littlejohn & Company, a private equity firm based in Greenwich, Connecticut. Prior to Littlejohn & Company, he worked for Smith Barney in New York City in the company's investment banking division.

Housser and his business partner, Brad Stroh, founded Achieve in 2002. Housser serves on the American Fair Credit Council's (AFCC) board of directors, a position he has held since 2006, when it operated under the name The Association of Settlement Companies. In 2010, he was awarded the association's President's Award for outstanding voluntary service to the organization and contributions that "benefits the consumer".

In 2005, Stroh and Housser purchased the Bills.com domain and relaunched it as a website that provides consumers with information and interactive tools dealing with personal finance topics including debt relief assistance, mortgage loans, and insurance. In 2008, Entrepreneur magazine named Bills.com No. 3 in the Hot 100 Fastest Growing Companies in America.

In December 2013, the company announced that Vulcan Capital, an investment group owned by Microsoft co-founder Paul Allen, would invest $125 million of venture capital in Achieve Company, an online lending platform to make unsecured loans to consumers. Housser is CEO of Achieve Company.

In 2015, Stone Point Capital, a private equity firm based in Greenwich, CT purchased a minority stake in the company.

== Awards ==
- Winner of 2008 Ernst & Young Entrepreneurs of the Year for the Northern California region.
- Named to the Silicon Valley/San Jose Business Journal's "40 Under 40" list.
