= Bart Layton =

British filmmaker (b. 1975)

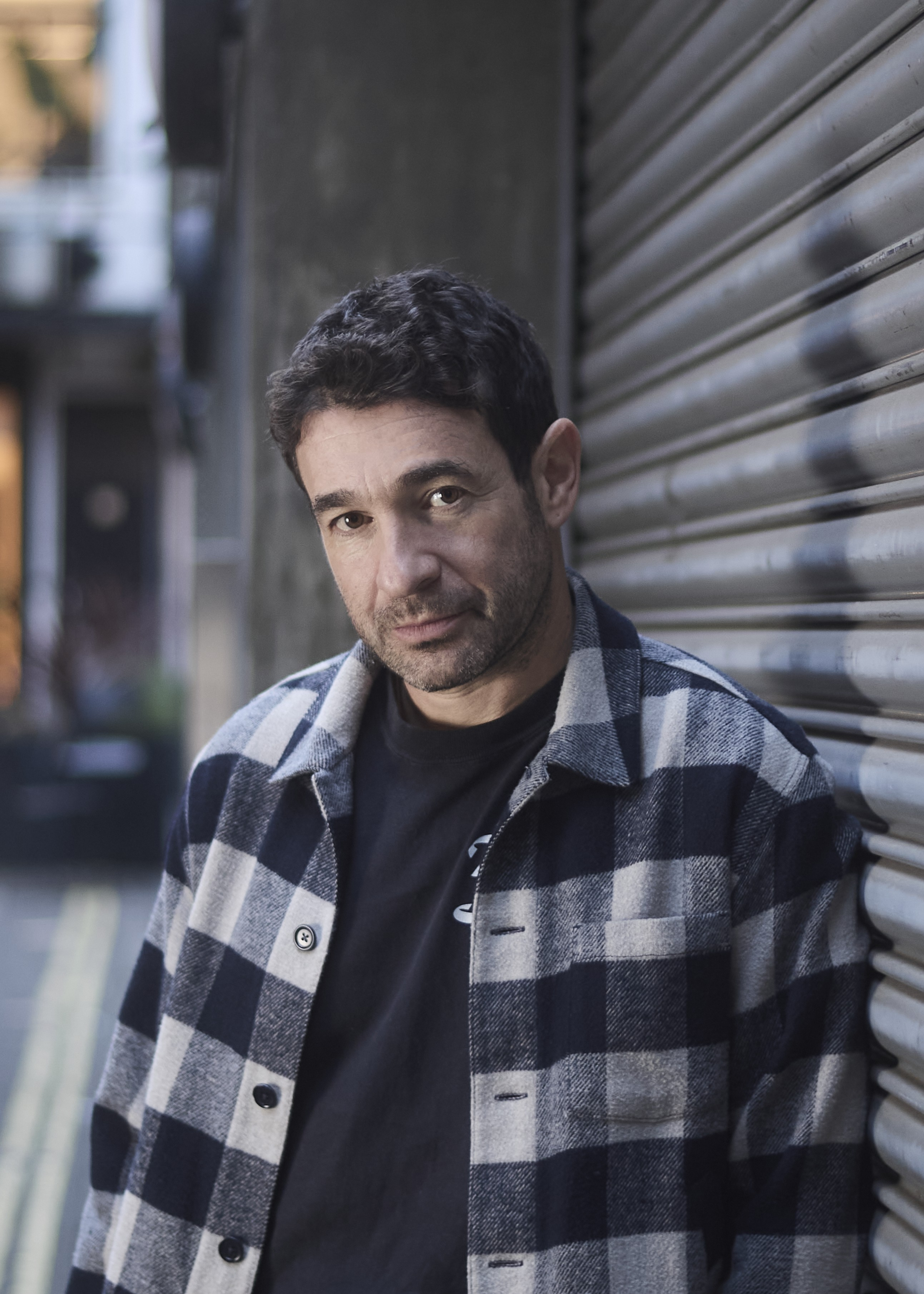
- Layton in 2026
- Born: Bartholomew Nicholas Layton; 1975 (age 50–51); London, England
- Occupations: Film director, screenwriter, producer

Bartholomew Nicholas Layton (born 1975) is an English filmmaker. He rose to prominence as a documentarian, winning a BAFTA Award for Outstanding Debut and a nomination for Best Documentary for The Imposter (2012). He then directed the 2018 film American Animals, a hybrid documentary/docudrama film based on the Transylvania University book heist.

== Early life and education ==
Layton was born in the Hammersmith district of London. Both of his parents were artists, one a sculptor and the other a painter and theatre director. Early in his life, he considered going into film or being a painter.

== Career ==
He made his directorial debut in 2012 with the true-crime story The Imposter. It is about Frédéric Bourdin, a French man who claimed to be a missing Texas teenager. Layton won a BAFTA for Outstanding Debut by a British Writer, Director or Producer for the film at the 2013 EE British Academy Film Awards.

He both wrote and directed American Animals. It depicts a 2004 book heist, with fictionalized versions and interviews with real people. Among the interviewees are the original criminals behind the heist. He had initially discovered the story in a magazine. The film was picked up by MoviePass.

In May 2018, he signed with the Creative Artists Agency.

As of 2018, Layton is the creative director of RAW, a British production company.

== Personal life ==
Layton lives with his family in London.

== Filmography ==
- Banged Up Abroad (2006–2022)
- The Imposter (2012)
- American Animals (2018)
- Crime 101 (2026)
