= Transylvania University =

Private university in Lexington, Kentucky, US

- Seal of Transylvania University
- Latin: Universitas Transylvaniensis
- Former names: Transylvania Seminary (1780–1799); Bacon College (1837–1851); Kentucky University (1858–1865)
- Motto: In Lumine Illo Tradimus Lumen (Latin)
- Motto in English: In That Light, We Pass on the Light
- Type: Private liberal arts college
- Established: 1780; 246 years ago
- Religious affiliation: Disciples of Christ
- Academic affiliations: NAICU
- President: Brien Lewis
- Students: 1,007 (fall 2024)
- Location: Lexington, Kentucky, U.S. 38.0522°N 84.4936°W
- Campus: 150 acres (61 ha)
- Colors: Crimson
- Nickname: Pioneers
- Sporting affiliations: NCAA Division III – HCAC, OAC, ORLC, CCIW,
- Mascots: Raf, Rafinesque's big-eared bat
- Website: transy.edu

Transylvania University (colloquially as Transy) is a private liberal arts college in Lexington, Kentucky, United States. It was founded in 1780 and is Kentucky's oldest university. It offers 46 major programs, as well as dual-degree engineering programs, and is accredited by the Southern Association of Colleges and Schools. Its medical program has graduated 8,000 physicians since 1859.

Transylvania University takes its name from the Latin phrase trans silvam, meaning “across the woods.” The name refers to the Transylvania Colony, a short-lived land claim established in 1775 in what is now Kentucky, which at the time was part of Virginia. The university was founded in 1780 as Transylvania Seminary in the Kentucky District of Virginia.

It is the alma mater of two U.S. vice presidents, three U.S. Supreme Court justices, 50 U.S. senators, 101 U.S. representatives, 36 U.S. governors, and 34 U.S. ambassadors, making it a large producer of American statesmen.

== History ==
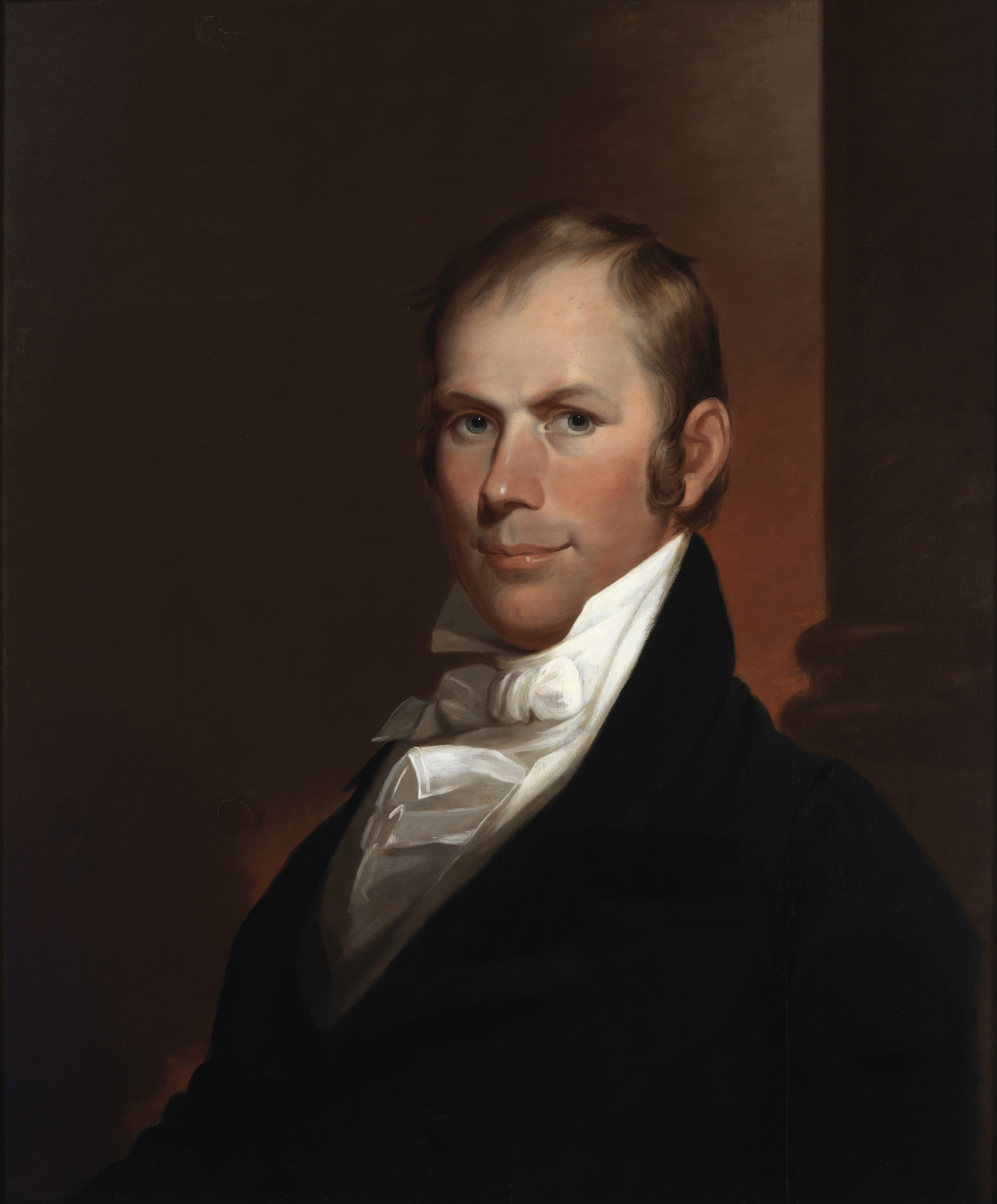
Henry Clay served off and on as professor of law and as trustee from 1807 to his death in 1852.

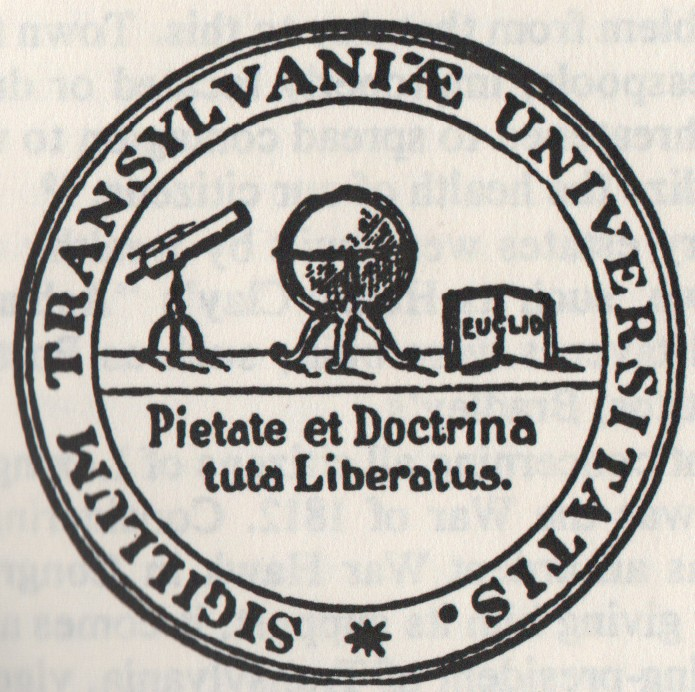
The original seal of Transylvania University

Transylvania—Latin for "across the woods"—was the first college west of the Allegheny Mountains and was named for the short-lived Transylvania Colony. The Virginia General Assembly chartered Transylvania Seminary in 1780, before Kentucky became a state. It was chiefly promoted by Presbyterians. Initially situated in a log cabin in Boyle County, the school moved to Lexington in 1789. The first site in Lexington was a single building in what is now Gratz Park.

By 1799, the institution was called "Transylvania University". By 1818, a new main classroom building was constructed. It burned down in 1829, and the school moved north of Third Street. Old Morrison was erected in 1830–34 under the supervision of Henry Clay, who both taught law and was a member of Transylvania's Board. By 1818, the university included a medical school, law school, divinity school, and college of arts and sciences.

The Disciples of Christ church founded "Bacon College" in Georgetown. It operated from 1837 to 1851 and 1858 to 1861. It was renamed Kentucky University in 1858. In 1865, the remnants of the school were merged into Transylvania University. The merged institution took the name "Kentucky University."

Transylvania has been a notable academic institution in the Bluegrass region ever since and was the sought-after destination for the children of the South's political leadership, military families, and business elite. It attracted many politically ambitious young men, including Stephen F. Austin, the founder of Texas.

=== After the Civil War ===
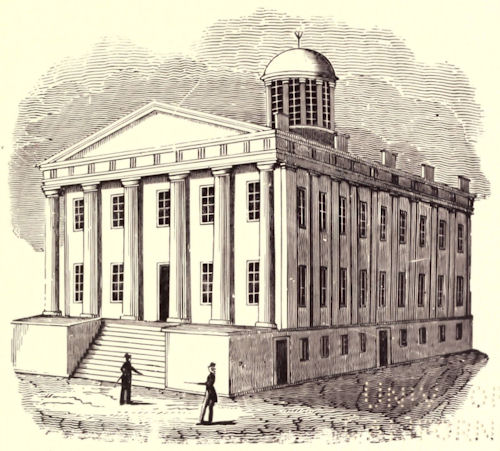
Medical Hall, which burned down in 1863

The merged institution used Transylvania's campus in Lexington while keeping the name Kentucky University. The university was reorganized into several new colleges, including the Agricultural and Mechanical College (A&M) of Kentucky, publicly chartered as a department of Kentucky University as a land-grant institution under the Morrill Act. But due to questions about having a federally funded land-grant college controlled by a religious body, the A&M college was spun off in 1878 as an independent, state-run institution. The A&M of Kentucky soon developed into one of the state's flagship public universities, the University of Kentucky. Kentucky University's College of the Bible, which traced its roots to Bacon College's Department of Hebrew Literature, received a separate charter in 1878. Kentucky University's seminary eventually separated but remained on the same campus until 1950. It later changed its name to the Lexington Theological Seminary. In 1903, Hamilton College, a Lexington-based women's college founded in 1869, merged into Kentucky University.

Due to confusion between Kentucky University and its daughter institution, the University of Kentucky, it was renamed "Transylvania University" in 1908.

=== 1988 trademark dispute ===
In 1988, Transylvania University experienced an infringement on its trademark when Hallmark Cards began selling "Transylvania University" T-shirts. The product, developed for Halloween, was intended to be a novelty item purporting to be college wear from the fictional Count Dracula's alma mater. When contacted by Transylvania University, Hallmark said it had been unaware of the real university and recalled all unsold products.

== Campus ==
The institution is on a 48-acre (19.4-hectare) urban campus about four blocks from the center of the city of Lexington. It has 24 buildings, 3 athletic fields, 3 dining areas, and a National Historic Landmark. The campus is divided by North Broadway: to the east stand the academic buildings; to the west, most of the residential buildings.

=== Academic campus ===
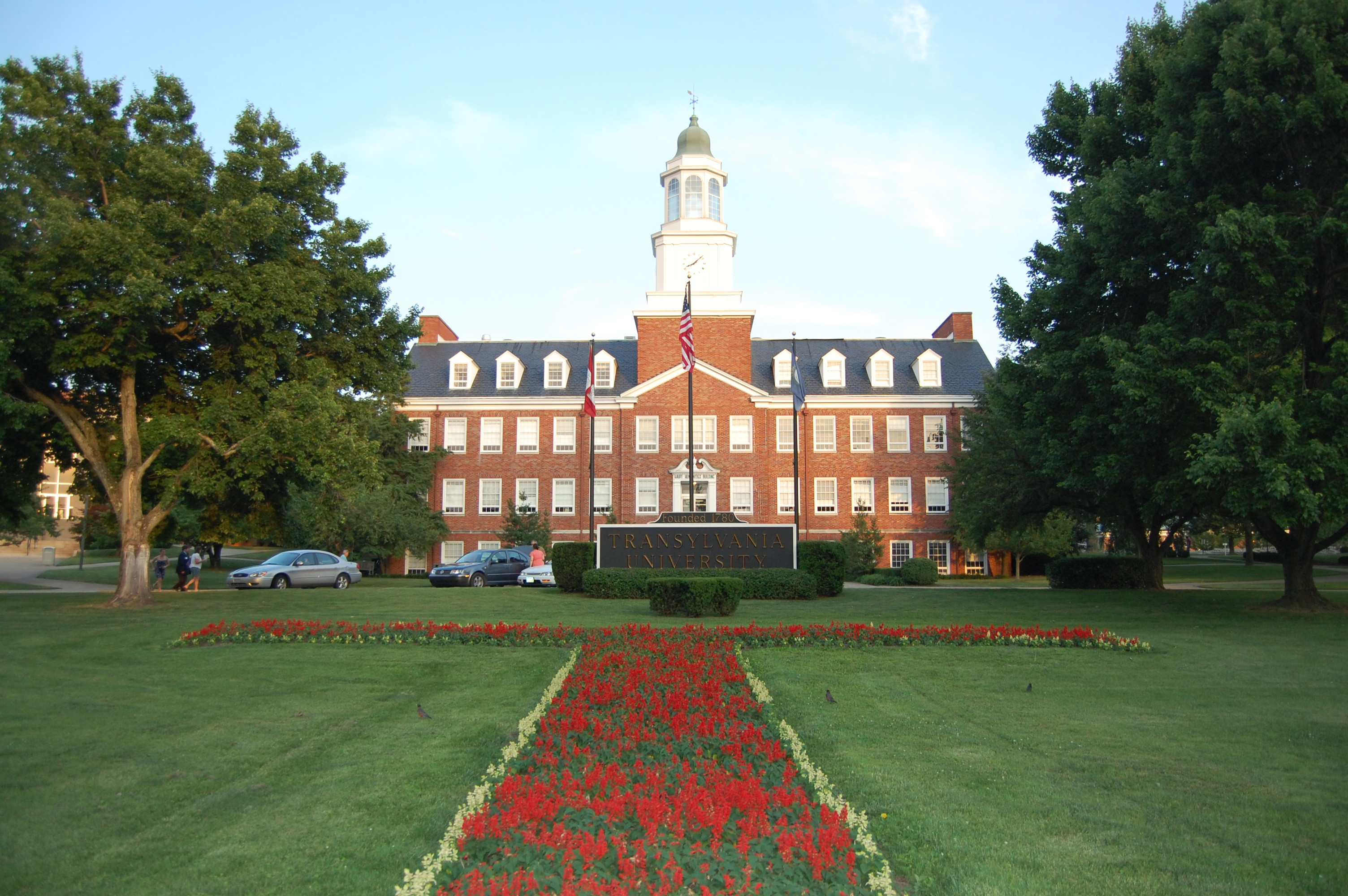
Carpenter Academic Center and the Transylvania Lawn

The academic side of campus lies east of North Broadway, one of the major streets in Lexington. Old Morrison is the central administration building. Designed by pioneer Kentucky architect Gideon Shryock and erected in 1833 under the supervision of Henry Clay (then professor of law at Transylvania), Old Morrison is the central image on Lexington's city seal. It houses the offices of financial aid, accounting, the registrar, the president, the dean, communications, the Center for Academic and Professional Enrichment, and more. The building also holds the tomb of Constantine Rafinesque, professor of natural science at the university from 1819 to 1826, and Sauveur Francois Bonfils, who taught at the university from 1842 to 1849 (a native of France, he was forced to flee because of political discord). During the Civil War, Old Morrison was a hospital for Union and Confederate soldiers. It was gutted by fire in 1969 but renovated and reopened in 1971. It was designated a National Historic Landmark in 1965 in recognition of the institution's status as the oldest west of the Allegheny Mountains.

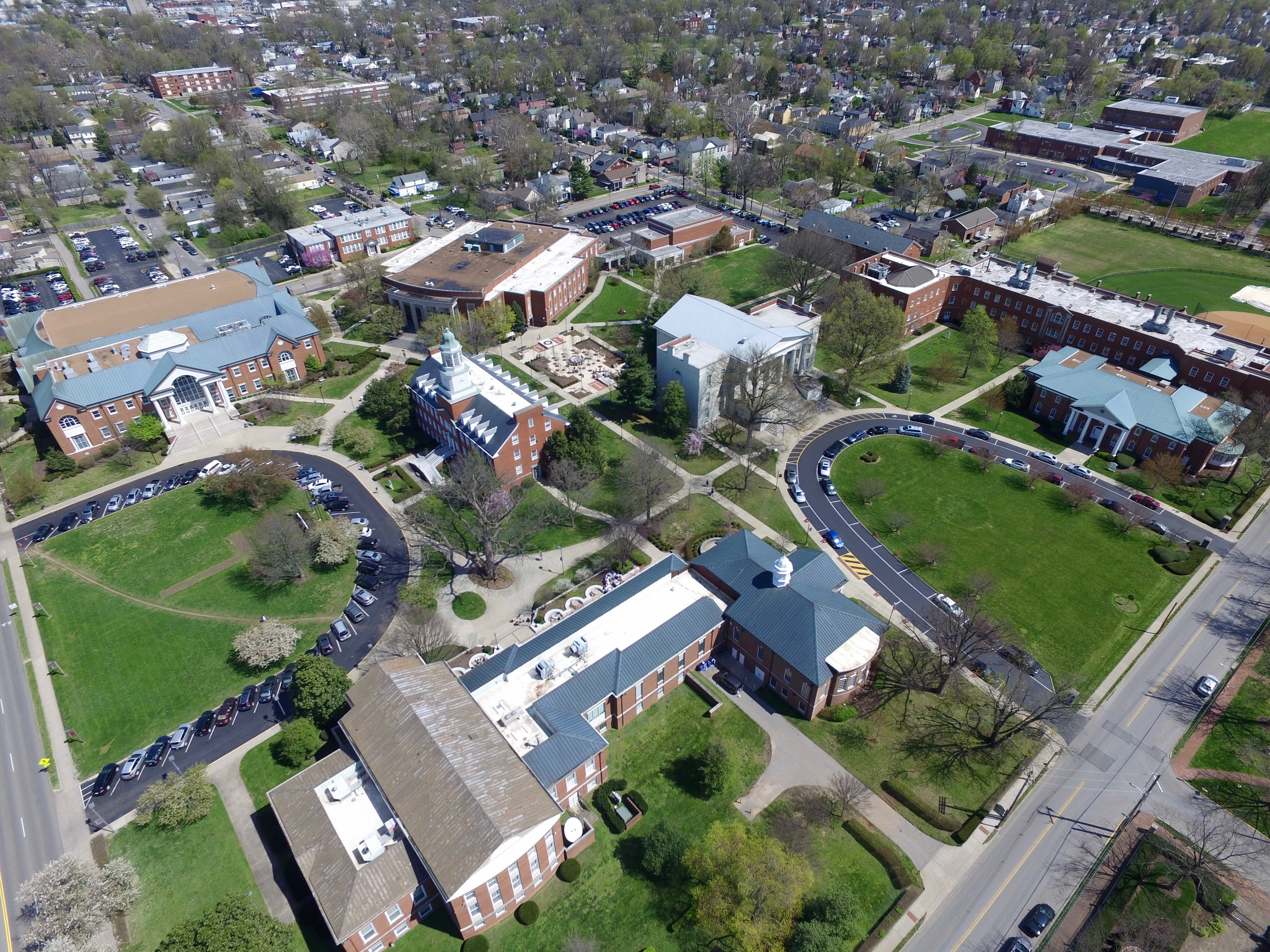
Academic Side of Campus in April 2016

Beside Old Morrison, the Carpenter Academic Center houses the faculties of English, philosophy, history, political science, foreign languages, and classics, as well as professors' offices. The center, formerly known as Haupt Humanities, was renovated during the 2017–18 academic year; classrooms and faculty offices were updated, student gathering spaces were added, and new technologies were integrated. Carpenter Academic Center reopened in May 2018.

Behind the Carpenter Academic Center is Alumni Plaza, which opened in 2015 as an outdoor classroom and social gathering area. Also on the academic side of campus, the Clive M. Beck Center, a state-of-the-art student indoor athletic facility, opened in 2002; it is a location for men's and women's athletics and holds student fitness equipment.

The Mitchell Fine Arts Center is the home of the music program, providing offices and classrooms for drama and music programs. It contains a large concert hall, a small theater, a recital hall, the Morlan Gallery, the music technology classroom, and the Office of Information Technology. The Morlan Gallery in the center has six or seven art exhibitions every academic year, primarily as a gallery of contemporary art, including Appalachian folk art, Chinese art, contemporary African art, sculptural installations, and performance and video pieces. The gallery offers guided tours and lectures for school groups, civic clubs, and senior-citizen organizations.

The Cowgill Center for Business, Economics, and Education has classrooms for these subjects and offices for professors. It features a high-tech multimedia classroom, a specialized classroom for training education majors, a computer lab, lecture halls, seminar rooms, study areas, faculty offices, and the Monroe Moosnick Medical and Science Museum. The L.A. Brown Science Center houses classrooms, laboratories and offices for the natural sciences, computer science, and mathematics programs. A state-of-the-art nuclear magnetic resonance spectrometer is available to enhance students' academic and research experience.

=== Library ===
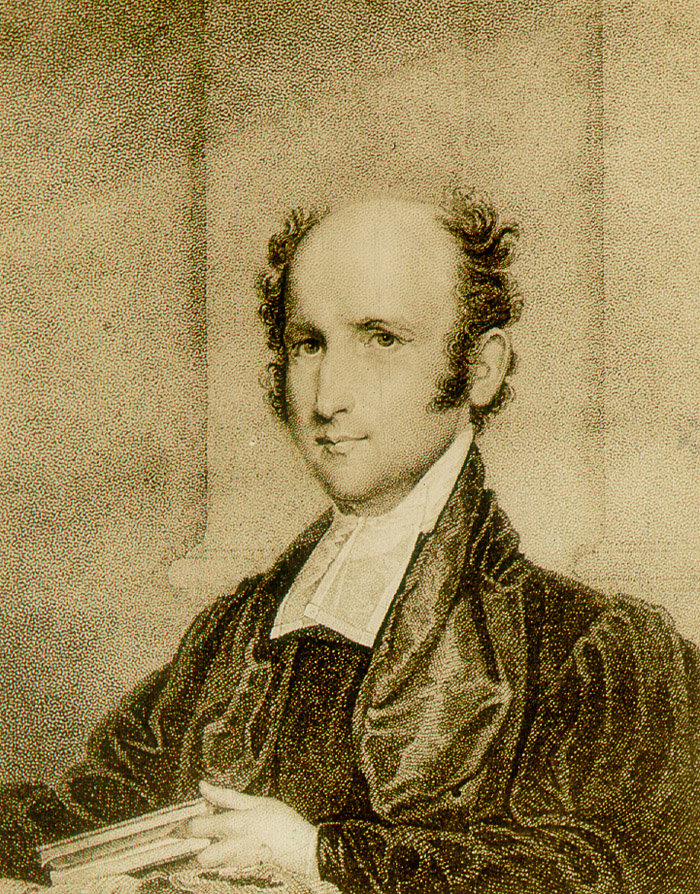
Horace Holley led Transylvania from 1818 to 1827

Originally completed in 1952 and dedicated by President Dwight D. Eisenhower, the main library building was renovated and enlarged in 1985; it was re-dedicated by then Vice President George H. W. Bush as the Douglas Gay Jr. and Frances Carrick Thomas Library. The Special Collections of the library houses a manuscript collection with letters, diaries, and documents of notable historical figures associated with the institution, including Henry Clay, Jefferson Davis, Robert Peter, John Wesley Hunt, Daniel Drake, and Horace Holley. The rare books section houses a collection of books relating to the history of horses and natural history and a collection of pre-1800 medical books. The books belonging to the Transylvania Medical Department, which closed in 1859, are now kept in special collections. The library was the setting for the film "American Animals", which told how four 20-year-old students stole and attempted to sell some of the rare books.

The basement of the library was renovated and became the Dugi Academic Center for Excellence in 2013 and the first floor was renovated in 2015.

The Glenn Building was constructed as a multi-purpose building in 2005 and houses a coffee shop, Gratz Perk, admissions offices, and expansion space for the library. It was named in honor of James F. Glenn, a former trustee who donated $1.1 million for its construction. It has an environmentally friendly geothermal heating and air conditioning system, and several mature trees near the site were preserved during construction.

=== Residence halls ===
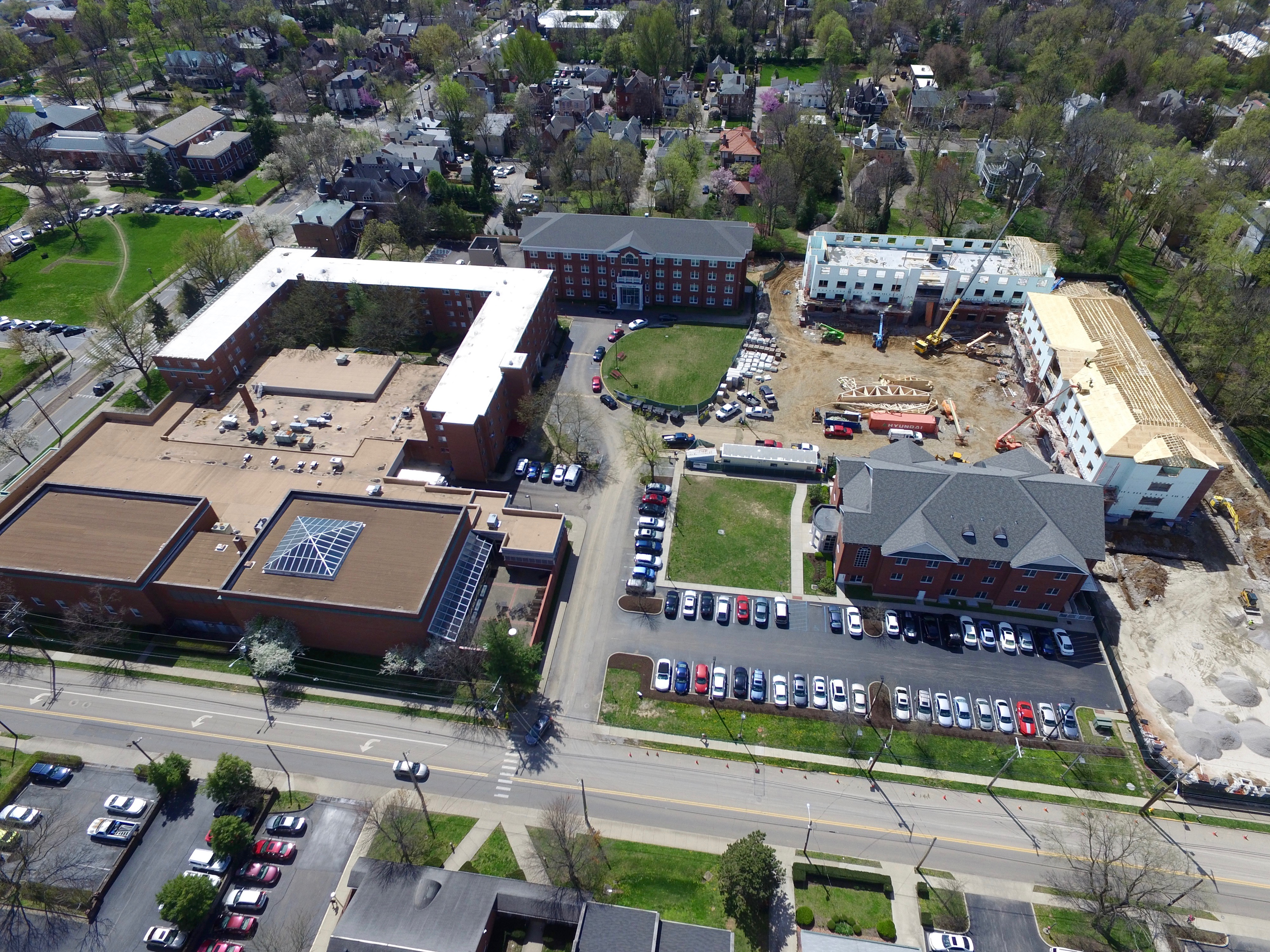
Residential side of campus in April 2016 showing construction

The western half of the campus contains most of the residential parts of the campus. Dalton-Voigt Hall opened in the fall of 2015 and houses first-year students. This $7 million, 144-bed facility offers suite-style living and common spaces for studying and activities. Jefferson Davis Hall and Henry Clay Hall were demolished in June 2015 to make space for construction of Kincaid Hall and Bassett Hall, which are similar to Dalton-Voigt and opened in January 2017.

Thomson Hall was opened in the fall of 2008. It received Energy Star rating in 2009. It features 31 suite-style units, including study areas, living rooms, kitchenettes, bathrooms, and bedrooms. The building is three stories tall, has 28,000 square feet (2,600 m^{2}) of space, and cost $5.5 million. Thomson Hall was built to be environmentally friendly and exceeds state insulating value requirements by 28 percent. It has geothermal heating and energy, low-flow shower heads, a total energy recovery wheel on outside ventilation, fifty percent recycled material in the parking lot surface, and energy-saving lighting.

Dalton-Voigt, Thomson, Kincaid, and Bassett Halls surround Back Circle, a central outdoor field where students can socialize, play sports, or do homework.

The other residence spaces on campus are Poole Residence Center and Rosenthal Apartment Complex. Poole houses first-year students in large, suite-style rooms. Rosenthal houses upper-class students in an outdoor apartment style.

=== Campus Center ===
The newly built and renovated William T. Young Campus Center opened in 2020. It is a 97,710-square-foot (9,078 m^{2}) building—61,400 square feet of new construction and 36,310 square feet of renovated space. Replacing Forrer Hall, the structure offers two dining locations, an athletic workout facility, a competition-sized swimming pool, and numerous meeting spaces of all sizes and uses. It also houses the health and wellness center, student life offices, and the bookstore.

The Campus Center was dedicated in October 2021 where William T. Young Sr., for whom the original Campus Center was named, and William T. Young Jr. were recognized for their many contributions to the institution over the years. Both chaired the Transylvania University Board of Trustees. Portraits of both men adorn a wall of the new center to commemorate the family's contributions.

== Academics ==
Academic rankings

Liberal arts
- U.S. News & World Report: 108
- Washington Monthly: 86

National
- Forbes: 307
- WSJ/College Pulse: 381

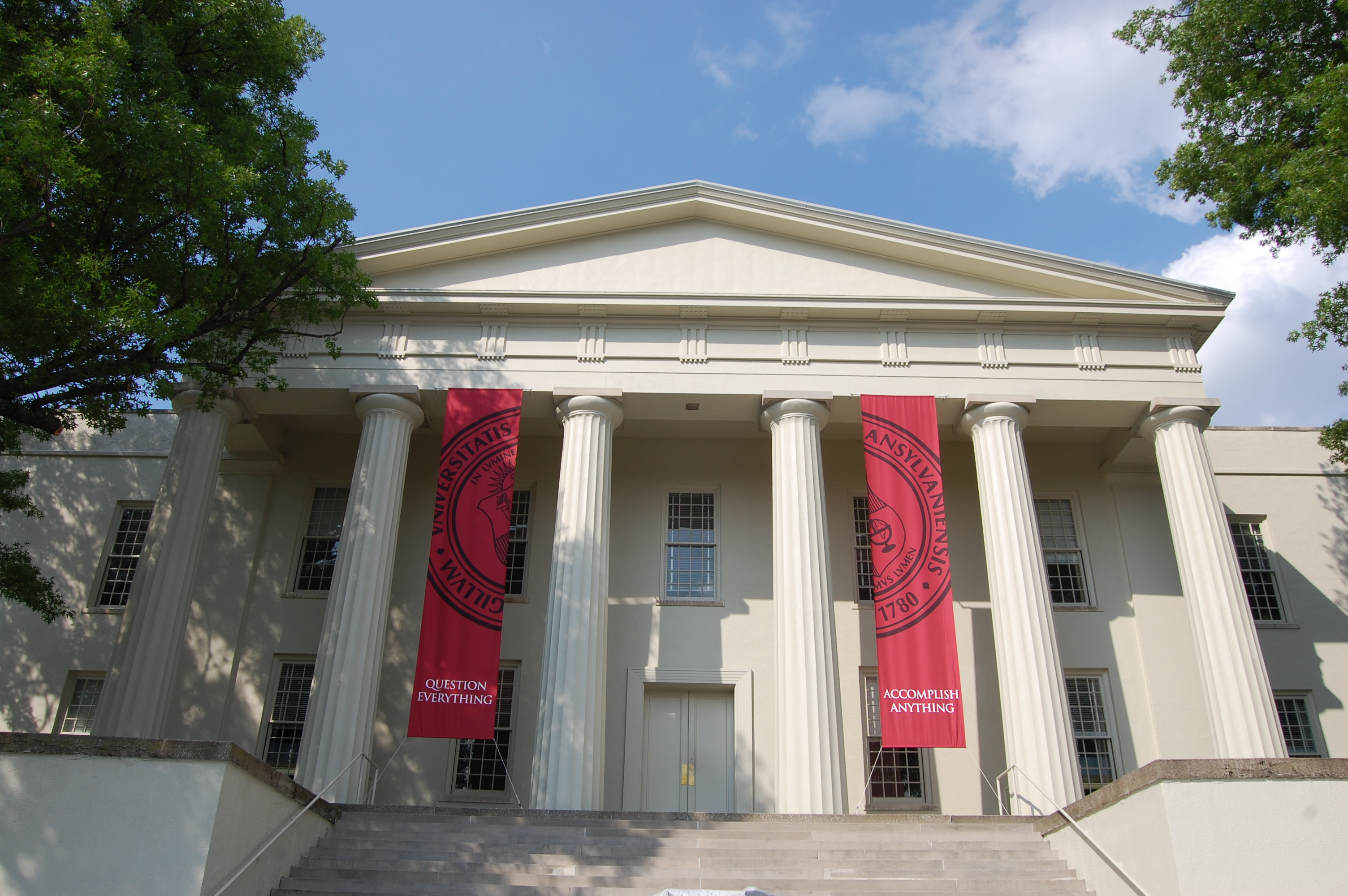
Old Morrison

According to U.S. News & World Report, Transylvania University has an acceptance rate of 92%. Accepted applicants have an SAT score range (25th–75th percentile) of 1050–1360. Transylvania presently offers 46 majors and 37 minors and many pre-professional tracks spread among four divisions: Fine Arts, Humanities, Natural Sciences & Mathematics and Social Sciences. It offers such majors as Philosophy, Politics, and Economics (PPE) and Writing, Rhetoric, and Communication (WRC), as well as interdisciplinary studies, or the ability of students to design their majors.

In 2018, Transylvania became the first of Kentucky's liberal arts colleges to partner with the Peace Corps to establish a Peace Corps Prep program, a diversity-oriented program designed to prepare undergraduates for international development fieldwork and potential Peace Corps service.

Transylvania also partnered with Appalachian Regional Healthcare to incentivize students from Eastern Kentucky and West Virginia interested in healthcare, whether as a practitioner or administrator, to attend Transylvania. Students who participate will return to their home region and communities to work for ARH post-graduation.

== Student life ==
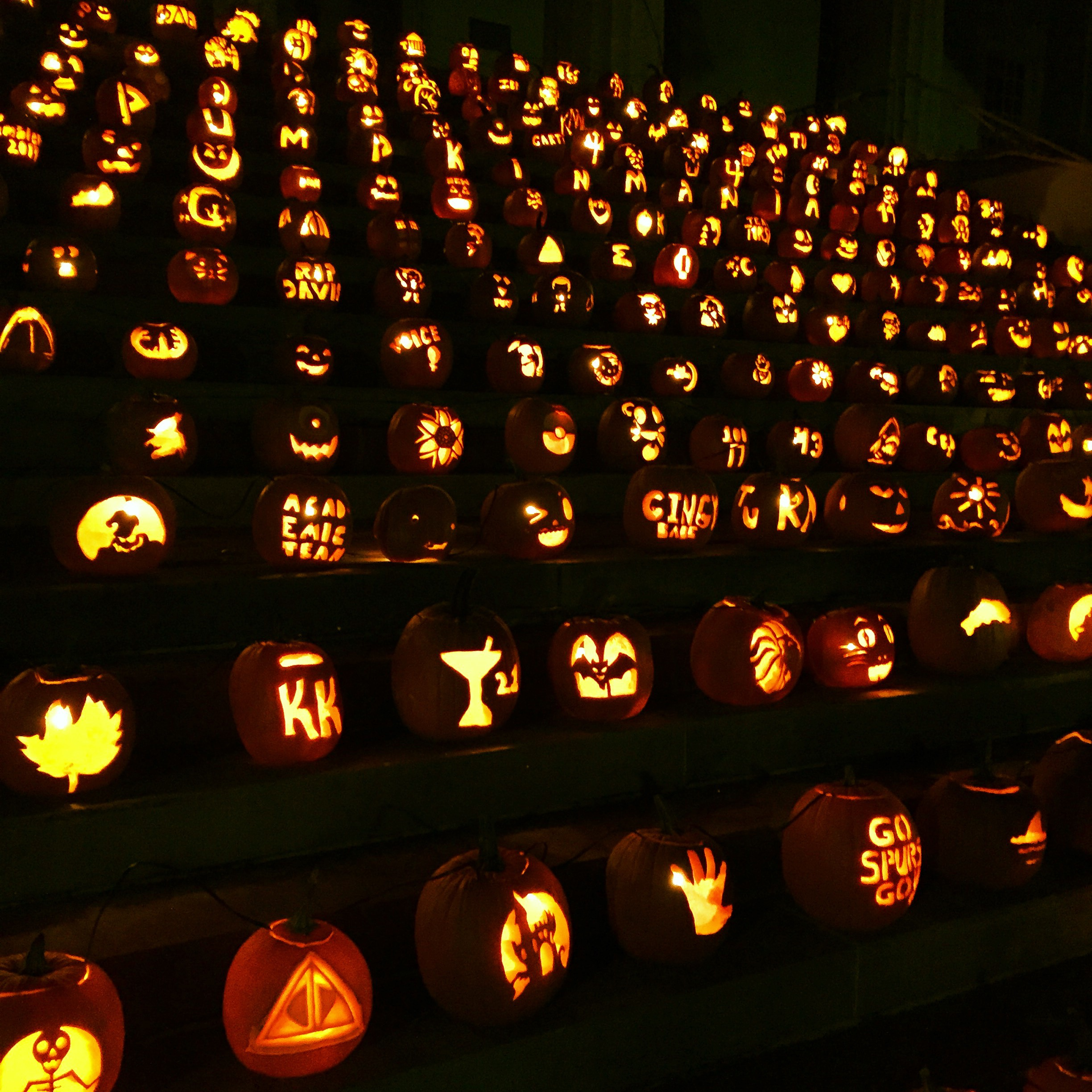
Pumpkins lit on the steps of Old Morrison

Before beginning classes, first-year students participate in an orientation week and various community-building exercises, including long-standing traditions, such as the first-year serenade and greet line. The serenade divides the class in two for a fun sing-off. The greeting line starts as a large arch comprising every member of the first-year class (and various faculty, staff, and campus student leaders). Every line member goes down and shakes hands with all other members, introducing themselves along the way.

There is a week-long celebration of Halloween by students known as "Raf Week" in honor of the 19th-century botanist, inventor, and Transylvania professor Constantine Rafinesque. The institution ends October with a unique combination of activities, including a lottery for four students to win the chance to spend the night in Rafinesque's tomb. The steps of Old Morrison are lined with pumpkins carved by students, faculty, staff, and members of the community around Halloween for what is called Pumpkinmania. In honor of Professor Rafinesque, the grab-and-go dining space in the Campus Center is named the "Rafskeller"—a pun on the word Rathskeller.

Transylvania is also known for the Kissing Tree, a white ash tree estimated to be nearly 280 years old—35 years older than the institution itself. In the 1940s and 1950s, the administration ignored students kissing in public near the tree when it was frowned upon elsewhere on campus. Today, with the rules on public displays of affection slackened, students refer to the tree as the Kissing Tree. In 2003, The Chronicle of Higher Education included the Kissing Tree among the most romantic places on college campuses in America and was mentioned in a Wall Street Journal article about romance on college campuses.

=== Arts ===
The campus, home to various Transylvania choirs and instrumental ensembles, also hosts several exhibitions in its Morlan Gallery that change by season. The gallery focuses on work produced in the past decade from worldwide viewpoints. Transylvania was honored with an international Gold Award for Transylvania Treasures, its publication dedicated to showcasing the rare and valuable items in Transylvania University's special collections and medical and science museum, and now is considered a treasure in its own right, concluding a prestigious national competition sponsored by the Council for Advancement and Support of Education. Transylvania's theatre department produces two to three stage productions every year. The Lucille C. Little Theater provides a performance space for theatre performances by students and professionals on campus.

=== Fraternities and sororities ===
Transylvania has Greek life on campus, with five fraternities and five sororities and 42% of the students as members of Greek organizations. In its 2022 edition of "The Best 387 Colleges", The Princeton Review named Transylvania in the top 10 U.S. schools on its list of colleges with "Lots of Greek Life".

== Athletics ==
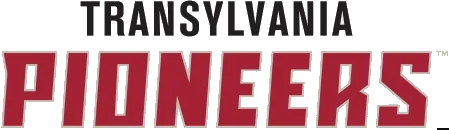
Transylvania Pioneers wordmark

Transylvania's athletic teams are nicknamed the Pioneers. The institution is a member of the Division III level of the National Collegiate Athletic Association (NCAA), primarily competing in the Heartland Collegiate Athletic Conference (HCAC) since the 2001–02 academic year. The Pioneers previously competed in the Kentucky Intercollegiate Athletic Conference (KIAC; now known as the River States Conference (RSC) since the 2016–17 school year) of the National Association of Intercollegiate Athletics (NAIA) from 1916–17 to 2000–01.

Transylvania competes in 27 intercollegiate varsity sports: Men's sports include baseball, basketball, cross country, golf, lacrosse, soccer, swimming & diving, tennis and track & field; women's sports include basketball, cross country, field hockey, golf, lacrosse, soccer, softball, swimming & diving, tennis, track & field, triathlon and volleyball; and co-ed teams include cheerleading, dance and equestrian (eventing).

The Transylvania Pioneers student-athletes compete under colors crimson and white at a variety of venues throughout the country; maintain successful results; and often compete against larger institutions including Ohio University.

The coaches at Transylvania University have been continually recognized for athletic achievements.

=== Football ===
Transylvania won the first-recorded football game in the state of Kentucky by defeating the Centre Praying Colonels of Centre College 13 3/4–0. Its 1903 team claimed a southern championship. The Pioneers played football from 1888 to 1941 (except 1906), when the team disbanded.

== Notable people ==
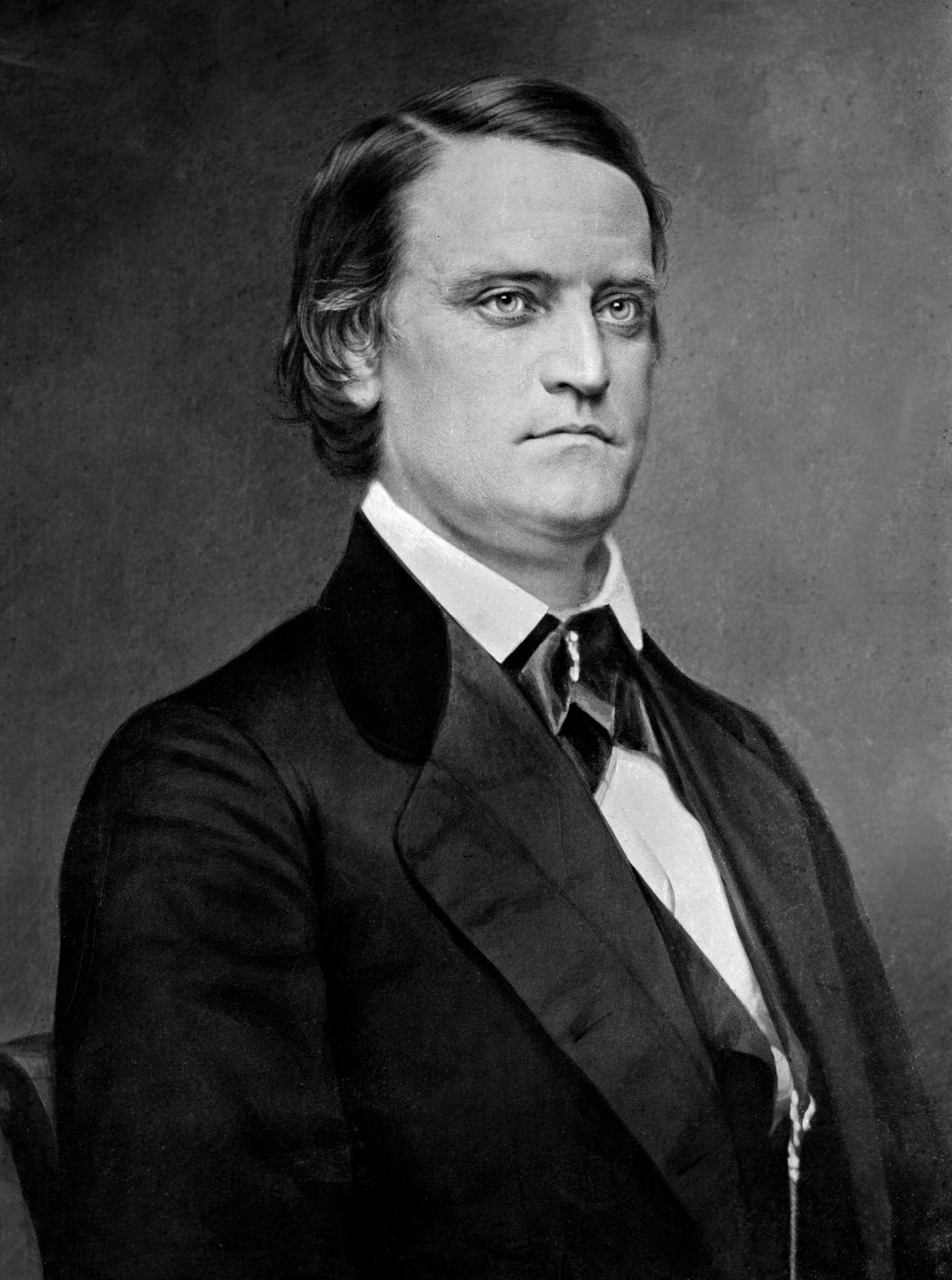
Alumnus John C. Breckinridge; Democratic U.S. Vice President to the 14th U.S. President Franklin Pierce

Amongst Transylvania's prominent alumni are two U.S. vice presidents, John C. Breckinridge and Richard Mentor Johnson, and three U.S. Supreme Court justices, Robert Trimble, John Marshall Harlan, and Samuel Freeman Miller.

=== Notable faculty ===
- Henry Bidleman Bascom (1796–1850) – U.S. Congressional Chaplain, Methodist Bishop, President of Transylvania University 1842–1849.
- Robert Hamilton Bishop, first president of Miami University in Oxford, Ohio
- Henry Clay, seminal law department professor
- Charles Caldwell, physician and founder of the University of Louisville School of Medicine
- Daniel Drake, taught materia medica from 1817 to 1818, dean from 1825 to 1827
- Maurice Manning, poet
- Charles Martin "C. M." Newton, TU basketball coach, 1956–68
- Constantine Samuel Rafinesque, professor of botany, buried on campus
- Charles Wilkins Short, American botanist
- Elisha Warfield, doctor and noted horse breeder, selected as the first Professor of Surgery and Obstetrics at the (then-) newly established medical school at Transylvania University

== In popular culture ==
- Robert Penn Warren set part of his 1946 novel All the King's Men at Transylvania University.
- Robert Lowell referred to the institution in his sonnet "The Graduate (Elizabeth)." The poem states gleefully, "Transylvania's Greek Revival Chapel is one of the best Greek Revival things in the South."
- A 2004 robbery at Transylvania University's special collections library is the subject of the 2018 true-crime drama film American Animals. It was also the focus of Episode 3 of the Audible podcast "Heist with Michael Caine," as well as a memoir by one of the culprits involved in the heist, Mr. Pink: The Inside Story of the Transylvania Book Heist.
- Transylvania is home to the Judy Gaines Young Book Award, given annually to honor an excellent work of fiction or poetry written in the Appalachian region in the prior two to three years.

== See also ==
- History of education in Kentucky
- List of presidents of Transylvania University
