= Transylvania University book heist =

2004 library theft

- Date: November-December 2004
- Location: Transylvania University, Lexington, Kentucky, U.S.
- Type: Theft
- Perpetrators: Warren Lipka; Spencer Reinhard; Chas Allen; Eric Borsuk
- Outcome: All four perpetrators sentenced to seven years in prison

The Transylvania University book heist, also known as the Transy book heist, was the theft of rare books from the library of Transylvania University in 2004.

== Background ==
The library at Transylvania University was the beneficiary of book collectors, particularly Clara Peck, a wealthy New York sportswoman. Her donations included original folios of The Birds of America by John James Audubon, a two volume edition of Hortus Sanitatis and a first edition of On the Origin of Species by Charles Darwin.

Betty Jean Gooch was the librarian who oversaw the Rare Books collection—she had started working at the university in 1994.

Spencer Reinhard was a student on an arts scholarship at Transylvania University. He had been best friends since age eight with Warren Lipka, a student on an athletics scholarship at the University of Kentucky. Both were from South Lexington.

Spencer had been on a freshman-orientation tour of the university, including the library and the Special Collection.

Lipka had become involved in selling fake IDs to students along with another University of Kentucky student Eric Borsuk. They had a falling-out when $2000 belonging to Borsuk went missing. After that, Lipka reached out to Reinhard.

Reinhard told Lipka about the valuable books in the collection. Reinhard watched the security at the library and told Lipka that the only security consisted of a single librarian and a visitors book.

Lipka met with a contact near Central Park. The contact gave him an email address and told him to use the name "Terry" in any communications. This led Lipka to a meeting in Amsterdam. He planned to get the stolen books evaluated in the New York offices of Christie's.

Lipka recruited Borsuk into the gang. They recruited Charles "Chas" Allen into the gang because of the weight of the books they planned to steal.

Lipka made an appointment with Christie's under the alias Walter Beckmann. He also emailed the librarian for an appointment in 16 December.

On that day, their planned getaway vehicle wasn't available, the stun-guns Lipka ordered hadn't arrived, the library was more crowded than they foresaw and their disguises as old men drew attention to them. They abandoned the attempt on that date. Lipka contacted the librarian and said he had missed the appointment due to a business trip and rescheduled for 11am on 17 December.

They agreed not to use the old men disguises for the raid.

== Theft ==
On the morning of 17 December, Reinhard watched from a neighboring building with a stolen mobile phone to communicate with Lipka. The getaway vehicle was driven by Allen. Lipka signed the visitors book as Beckmann going to the Rare Book room with Gooch. He asked if a friend he called "John" could accompany him, to which Gooch agreed. Borsuk was the second man.

When Gooch brought them into the Rare Book Room, she showed them some volumes, including the Audubon ones. Lipka attacked her with the stun gun, then pulled a woolen hat over her head and bound her with zip ties and gagged her. She noticed that her attacker used her work nickname ("BJ") when he threatened her, which struck her as odd.

The thieves put the Audubon folios in a bedsheet and smaller books in backpacks. They could not find the escape route they planned on using and abandoned the folios. They got away in the van, but not before another librarian spotted them. She told the police there were four thieves.

The thieves took the books they had to the New York offices of Christie's, where Lipka introduced himself as "Mr. Williams" and Reinhard as "Mr. Stephens". Melanie Halloran apologized that Tom Lecky, whom they had an appointment with, was not available because of an upcoming public auction, but that she would deal with them. The men claimed to be sole representatives of Walter Beckmann, a reclusive book collector from Boston. Halloran asked them about the provenance of the books and took notes. After half an hour the meeting ended and Halloran said she would discuss the best approach with her bosses. The two men left a phone number.

== Investigation ==
Yahoo provided law enforcement with all the information they had on the Walter Beckmann email account in response to a federal subpoena. The FBI interviewed Melanie Halloran and got other details from Christie's, including the phone number left with them. The number was registered to Gary Reinhard of Lexington, Kentucky. The voicemail had a recording "This is Spence. Leave a message.". This led law enforcement to the social media account of Lipka and Reinhard, who resembled the men seen at Christie's. The authorities followed them and raided their homes on 11 February 2005. Due to overwhelming evidence, all four confessed.

== Trial ==
In April 2005 they all pleaded guilty to six federal charges, including theft of cultural artifacts from a museum and interstate transportation of federal property.

The judge ruled they were all equally culpable, that the value of the theft should be of the books actually removed from the building and that the stun gun used was a dangerous weapon. They were sentenced to seven years each without parole.

== Aftermath ==
Betty Jean Gooch suffered psychological trauma as a result of the raid, though she forgave the thieves.

Gooch retired in 2020.

== In popular culture ==
The saga of the Transylvania University book heist was adapted by writer-director Bart Layton into the 2018 feature film American Animals, a docudrama that fuses a fictionalized account of the heist with interview segments with the real-life people involved, with Warren Lipka, Spencer Reinhard, Chas Allen, Eric Borsuk and Betty Jean Gooch all appearing as themselves. The film's title comes from Borsuk's memoir, which derives its name from a passage in Charles Darwin's On the Origin of Species, one of the books stolen by the gang.
