= Mitch Lowe =

American businessman

J. Mitchell Lowe
- Born: 1951/1952
- Occupation: Businessman
- Years active: 1984–present
- Employer(s): Netflix; McDonald's Corporation; Redbox; MoviePass
- Known for: Leadership roles in the video and rental industry
- Title: Former CEO, MoviePass
- Website: mitchlowe.net

J. Mitchell Lowe (born 1951/1952) is an American businessman known for his work in the video and rental industry. He was the CEO of MoviePass, a subscription service that charged members a monthly fee for movie tickets at cinemas. He has also served as an executive at Netflix and the president of Redbox.

== Career ==
Lowe was president of Video Droid from June 1984 to March 1998. Following Video Droid, Lowe was vice president of Business Development and Strategic Alliances for Netflix from March 1998 to January 2003. Then, at McDonald's Corporation, Lowe was Senior Director and VP of Operations from May 2003 to December 2005. After McDonald's, Lowe worked at Redbox as Chief Operating Officer (2005 to 2009) and President (2009 to 2011). After his tenure at Redbox, Lowe was the CEO of Quarterly Co. from September 2012 to July 2014.

From September 2011 to January 2016, he was a board member of the Charles Tillman Cornerstone Foundation, which helps children and families in need access needed opportunities and resources. From August 2015 to April 2016, he was a board member of Alchemy, an independent distributor of film and television content in North America. From March 2015 to November 2017, he was also on the board of Cantaloupe Systems, a retail payments service provider that was acquired by USAT for over $80 million.

Lowe was named CEO of MoviePass in June 2016 and oversaw the growth of its userbase to more than 3 million subscribers. However, the company's business model struggled, dropping to less than 300,000 subscribers in the end. Lowe instructed MoviePass employees to change user passwords to save money in July 2018 when it ran out of funds.

On September 13, 2019, Lowe announced to subscribers that MoviePass would shut down the next day because "efforts to recapitalize the company have not been successful to date." Lowe left the company around January 28, 2020, after MoviePass' parent company filed for Chapter 7 bankruptcy and announced that it had ceased all business operations.

On June 7, 2021, MoviePass and Lowe settled charges with the Federal Trade Commission alleging that resetting customers' passwords and related behaviors violated the Federal Trade Commission Act and the Restore Online Shoppers’ Confidence Act (ROSCA).

On November 4, 2022, Mitch Lowe, along with Theodore Farnsworth, the former CEO of MoviePass' parent company Helios and Matheson Analytics, were each charged with one count of securities fraud and three counts of wire fraud stemming from their time together at MoviePass.

On September 16, 2024, Lowe pleaded guilty to a securities fraud charge related to the all-you-can-watch subscription scheme at MoviePass.
