= Helios and Matheson Analytics =

American technology company

Helios and Matheson Analytics Inc.
- Formerly: Software Ben-Tov, Inc.; The A Consulting Team, Inc.; Helios & Matheson North America Inc.; Helios & Matheson Information Technology Inc.
- Type: Public
- Traded as: Expert Market: HMNY
- Industry: Data; Cinema
- Founded: 1983; 43 years ago
- Defunct: January 28, 2020; 6 years ago
- Fate: Chapter 7 bankruptcy
- Headquarters: Empire State Building, Manhattan, New York City, New York, U.S.
- Key people: Parthasarathy Krishnan (Interim CEO)
- Net income: ▼US$150.8 million (2017)
- Number of employees: 71 (2018)
- Subsidiaries: MoviePass; Moviefone; MoviePass Films; Zone Technologies

Helios and Matheson Analytics Inc. was a publicly traded data analytics company based in New York City, New York. The company became widely known during its final years for acquiring and subsequently operating MoviePass, which ultimately led to the company's bankruptcy.

== History ==
The company was founded in 1983 by Shmuel BenTov as Software Ben-Tov. It changed its name later that year to The A Consulting Team. The company made its initial public offering in 1997.

In 2006, Helios & Matheson Information Technology Ltd., an IT consulting firm based in Chennai, India, purchased a majority stake in the company. The A Consulting Team changed its name in 2007 to Helios & Matheson North America, to highlight its association with the parent company.

The company again changed its name in 2011 to Helios & Matheson Information Technology Inc., to reflect that it was seeking business opportunities worldwide, and then in 2013 to Helios and Matheson Analytics, to reflect that the business had "moved beyond IT".

The company acquired Zone Technologies, maker of the RedZone Map app, in November 2016. Zone founder Ted Farnsworth was appointed chairman of Helios, and then, in January 2017, became Helios's CEO.

In August 2017, Helios purchased a majority stake in MoviePass. Helios advanced MoviePass $55 million from December to February 20, 2018. MoviePass then converted the advances from debt to equity. This increased Helios' ownership stake from 62.4 percent to 81.2 percent. Another $35 million in advances converted to capital put Helios at 91.8 percent, allowing for a merger unilaterally initiated by the Helios board. In January 2018, co-founder Stacy Spikes was fired from the company.

In April 2018, Helios acquired the movie listings website Moviefone from Verizon's digital media subsidiary, Oath Inc. As part of the transaction, Verizon took an equity stake in MoviePass.

In March 2018, the board of directors began the process to spin off Zone Technologies to shareholders as a separate, publicly traded company, with the hope that it would allow Helios to focus on its strengths.

In April 2018, Helios sold $150 million in stock with $30 million of the shares at $2.75, a discount from the closing market price of $3.83. Most of the proceeds were used to fund MoviePass. With the diluting and discount on the shares, prior investors indicated their unhappiness with the company on Twitter.

In May 2018, the company acquired the assets of Emmett Furla Oasis Films, gaining its executives' expertise in making films for a new subsidiary, MoviePass Films, with an option to purchase the library. The new company would be 51% owned by Helios and the remainder by EFO. By early August 2018, Helios and Matheson completed the acquisition of Emmett Furla Oasis Films assets for the MoviePass subsidiary, MoviePass Films.

In August 2018, the company reported a loss of $100 million in the second quarter of 2018 with the company trading at an implied value of $30 million. In October 2018, the Attorney General of New York opened an investigation into Helios and Matheson Analytics, looking into whether it misled investors about the company's financial situation.

With market perception of MoviePass affecting Helios & Matheson's stock value, in October 2018 the company revealed a preliminary plan to spin off its film industry units as MoviePass Entertainment Holdings. The plan calls for a stock dividend of a minority of the holding company's stock allowing Helios to retain a controlling interest and for listing the new company on the NASDAQ or alternative market. The company's stock was delisted from the Nasdaq on February 12, 2019, and moved to over-the-counter markets. On January 28, 2020, the company filed for chapter 7 bankruptcy and announced plans to close the company.
