= Bills.com =

Bills.com, LLC.
- Type: Private
- Industry: Internet, Financial services
- Founded: 2005
- Headquarters: San Mateo, California, USA
- Key people: Brad Stroh (Co-Founder); Ethan Ewing (President); Bradford Stroh (CEO)
- Number of employees: 600
- Website: www.bills.com

Bills.com is a US-based web site providing financial planning tools and financial services for individuals. Topics include credit card, insurance, debt relief, mortgage loan, student loan and various other consumer lending products.

As of 2010, the company behind Bills.com employs approximately 600 people and has an annual revenue of $106 million. At that time, Bills.com was ranked number 10 on Inc. Magazine's Top 100 Financial Services Companies list.

== Awards and recognition ==
- Entrepreneur magazine names Bills.com #3 in the Hot 100, fastest growing companies in America.
- Bills.com is No. 17 on Inc. Magazine's Top 100 Financial Services Companies list for the year 2008.
- Bills.com Founders named to 40 Under 40 list in Silicon Valley.
- Recipient for Ernst & Young Entrepreneur Of The Year 2008 Award in Northern California.
- Bills.com is No. 10 on Inc. Magazine's Top 100 Financial Services Companies list for the year 2009.
- Bills.com is No. 8 amongst Silicon Valley's 70 fastest-growing privately held companies.
