= Achieve Company =

American debt consolidation company

Achieve
- Type: Limited Liability Company
- Industry: Financial services
- Founded: 2002; 24 years ago
- Founders: Andrew Housser and Brad Stroh
- Headquarters: Tempe, Arizona, United States
- Area served: United States
- Key people: Andrew Housser (Co-CEO), Bradford Stroh (Co-CEO)
- Products: Debt Consolidation; Debt Relief; Personal Loans; Home Equity Loans/HELOCs; Financial apps
- Number of employees: 2,800 (2024)
- Website: www.achieve.com

Achieve is an American online personal finance company headquartered in Tempe, Arizona. Achieve provides consumer financial services including debt consolidation, debt relief, personal loans, home equity loans, financial apps, and financial education.

Co-founded by co-CEOs Andrew Housser and Brad Stroh, Achieve is a subsidiary of Freedom Financial Network, which they also founded. By 2002, the company had served more than 1 million consumers. The company’s 2,800 employees work across the country with hubs in California, Arizona, and Texas.

== History ==
The company was founded as Freedom Plus and started a pilot program in 2008 that made unsecured loans to consumers struggling with their existing debt. The company lent $25 million to people who had average FICO scores of 576. Average loan balances were greater than $15,000, and annual default rates were less than 2%. Interest rates were 3.75% above prime consumer debt rates.

In September 2022, FreedomPlus changed its name to Achieve Personal Loans, part of Achieve Company.

== Recognition ==
Achieve has been rated a best employer in 2022, 2023, and 2024 and has provided $400,000 in grants to non-profits including Habitat for Humanity Central Arizona where Linda Luman (EVP, Human Resources - Achieve) was added as a board member. Achieve was also rated best place for women to work in Arizona in 2025.

Achieve’s Care Fund is a company-wide resource for employees to contribute money or PTO for fellow workers in need. In 2023, the company’s employees donated more than $150,000 to the fund.

== See also ==
- Alternative financial services
- Non-bank financial institution
