= MoviePass =

American subscription-based movie ticketing service

MoviePass, Inc.
- Type: Private
- Industry: Entertainment
- Founded: June 30, 2011; 15 years ago
- Founders: Stacy Spikes; Hamet Watt
- Headquarters: New York City
- Area served: United States
- Key people: Stacy Spikes (CEO)
- Services: Subscription-based movie ticketing
- Owner: Stacy Spikes
- Website: www.moviepass.com

MoviePass, Inc. is an American subscription-based movie ticketing service owned by co-founder Stacy Spikes.

The service was launched in 2011 and allowed subscribers to purchase up to a movie ticket a day for a monthly fee. The service utilized a mobile app, where users check in to a theater and choose a movie and showtime, which resulted in the cost of the ticket being loaded to a prepaid debit card, which was used to purchase the ticket from the movie theater.

In 2017, the service was acquired by Helios and Matheson Analytics (HMNY) and the subscription cost was significantly lowered to $9.95 per month. Membership ballooned to over three million subscribers by June 2018, but the service began to suffer from financial issues, which ultimately caused the service to shut down in September 2019. On January 28, 2020, MoviePass' parent company HMNY filed for Chapter 7 bankruptcy and announced that it had ceased all business operations.

On November 10, 2021, MoviePass co-founder Stacy Spikes was approved ownership of the company by a New York bankruptcy court judge. Spikes—who was fired from the company in 2018, shortly after it was acquired by HMNY—announced a relaunch of the service in 2022.

== History ==
=== Original service ===
MoviePass was founded in 2011 by technology and entertainment entrepreneurs Stacy Spikes and Hamet Watt. It was backed by major investors including True Ventures, AOL Ventures, Lambert Media, Moxie Pictures and other investors.

The company launched in beta in June 2011 in San Francisco. During initial trials, it encountered resistance from movie theater chains, resulting in the company going on a "temporary hiatus". At first, MoviePass operated with a voucher system. Members printed a voucher on their home computers and redeemed them for movie tickets at participating cinemas. In August 2011, the company partnered with Hollywood Movie Money to conduct its service through its preexisting voucher program and cinema network.

The voucher system was replaced after users complained it was cumbersome. In October 2012, following a national beta test, the service switched to a mobile app and electronically preloaded prepaid card. While MoviePass claimed the card could be used at all cinemas that accepted major credit cards, there was still some hostility from the industry, including AMC Theatres, who publicly disassociated itself from the service.

In June 2016, MoviePass named Mitch Lowe, a former executive of Netflix and Redbox, as its new CEO. Lowe had been an advisor to the company since 2014. Under Lowe, the service began to experiment with different pricing models; Lowe stated that his eventual goal was to have a low-end service at around $20 per month, ranging up towards a high-end service at around $100 with unlimited movies and availability of 3D screenings. In some regions, the service tried offering different subscription plans to users, such as a $50 plan for six movies per month, or $99 for unlimited—both allowing users to purchase tickets to 3D screenings. The new plans were criticized by those who felt that they were designed to gouge "unprofitable" frequent users of the service.

In July 2016, MoviePass unveiled a new plan structure effective in September, with tiers based on two, three, or unlimited movies per month. Prices vary by region, with (for example) the two-movie-per-month plan costing from $15 in small markets to $21 in larger ones. The unlimited plans were also modified to remove the previous restriction of one film every 24 hours, with prices ranging from $40 to $50 per month. Lowe argued that the new plans were designed to appeal to those who did not go to movies often. In December 2016, the service had 20,000 subscribers.

Studio Movie Grill purchased a stake in the company in December 2016. MoviePass and Studio Movie Grill were also partnering on testing food features through the MoviePass app including OpenTable (purchases) and Explore More (menu).

=== Helios and Matheson subsidiary ===
In August 2017, a majority stake in MoviePass was sold to the analytics firm Helios and Matheson. At the same time, the company announced that it would lower its price for an unlimited plan allowing one film per-day, to $9.95 per month. Lowe explained that "after years of studying and analysis we found that people want to go to the movies more often, but the pricing keeps going up, and that prevents them from going more. We're making it more affordable for people." Helios and Matheson's CEO Ted Farnsworth stated the service wanted to increase the size of its userbase in order to analyze viewing habits for targeted advertising. Farnsworth compared the model to those of Facebook and Google, whose free services are subsidized by the collection of personal information for advertising. After announcing their new pricing, the company's website went down due to the increase in traffic. By September 2017, the number of subscribers had increased to 400,000, to 600,000 in mid-October, to one million in December, and two million in February 2018. In June 2018, the company announced in a press release that it had more than three million paying subscribers.

Helios advanced MoviePass $55 million from December to February 20, 2018. MoviePass then converted the advances from debt to capital. Helios ownership stake thus increased from 62.4 percent to 81.2 percent. Another $35 million in advances converted to capital put Helios to 91.8 percent allowing for a merger unilaterally initiated by the Helios board. On January 19, 2018, at the Sundance Film Festival, MoviePass announced the new subsidiary MoviePass Ventures, which would co-acquire films with traditional distributors.

In February 2018, the price further dropped to $7.95 per month for new customers if they paid annually. In March, they lowered it to $6.95. In April 2018, Helios and Matheson acquired the movie listings website Moviefone from Verizon Communications's digital media subsidiary Oath Inc., with Verizon taking a stake in MoviePass stock.

Also in April 2018, MoviePass quietly removed the unlimited plan for new customers, and replaced it with a new plan limited to three movies per-month, bundled with a complimentary three-month trial of iHeartRadio All-Access. Lowe stated that he was not sure if the previous plan would be reinstated, explaining that "We just always try different things. Every time we try a new promotion, we never put a deadline on it." There was also a change that prohibited MoviePass customers from buying multiple tickets to "select" movies. The unlimited plan was reinstated two weeks later, with the limited plan maintained as a cheaper option at the $7.95 price point; Lowe stated that the company was "absolutely committed" to keeping the unlimited option.

==== Financial issues ====
In May 2018, MoviePass' cash expenses exceeded its revenues by $40 million and the company announced that it expected to run a deficit of $45 million in the month of June. In late June 2018, Forbes reported that MoviePass was responding to the creation of the competitor AMC Stubs A-List by announcing new fees for its service, with surge fees added to popular films and prime timeslots. The peak pricing rolled out was $2 to $6 extra during peak times. In the summer of 2018 the company launched a $164 million bond sale. MoviePass said subscribers could waive one peak fee per month. At the end of the month, MoviePass announced it would begin selling merchandise.

On July 2, Helios and Matheson Analytics filed to raise $1.2 billion to keep MoviePass solvent. They filed to sell debt and securities. Following a "service interruption" on July 26, the firm announced that it was forced to borrow $5 million in order to continue its operations; auditors doubted whether the company would be able to remain in business. The weekend following this disruption, there were reports that screenings of Mission: Impossible – Fallout had been blacked out from the service. The following Monday, the company announced it would not be offering its services for upcoming major releases, such as The Meg (which was projected to debut to about $20 million), but would continue operating for smaller films, albeit with the continued peak pricing.

On August 6, 2018, MoviePass backtracked on plans to raise its monthly fee from $9.95 to $14.95, but announced that it would instead limit these subscribers to three free tickets per-month, with any further screening offering a $5 discount on the ticket price instead. MoviePass stated that this measure was intended to "protect the longevity of our company and prevent abuse of the service." On August 16, 2018, MoviePass announced that it would also limit the service's film options to "up to six films to choose from daily, including a selection of major studio first-run films and independent releases".

By early August 2018, Helios and Matheson completed the acquisition of Emmett Furla Oasis Films assets for the MoviePass subsidiary, MoviePass Films. On August 24, 2018, MoviePass announced that it had ceased providing its previous annual unlimited plan, with all subscribers transitioned to the monthly limited plan. Subscribers who do not wish to have this plan were instructed to cancel their subscriptions by August 31, 2018, to receive a pro-rated refund (as per the MoviePass terms of service, users who cancel their subscription may not re-join the service for 9 months). By October, reportedly over a million subscribers had cancelled the service, and by April 2019, paying subscribers had fallen over 90% from its peak, to 225,000.

In November 2018, a class action lawsuit was filed in San Francisco for not following through on its promises by blacking out various popular movies. On February 2, 2019, another class action suit was filed in New York state court against MoviePass for using bait-and-switch tactics.

The company announced its closure on September 14, 2019, because "efforts to recapitalize MoviePass have not been successful to date." On September 17, 2019, Ted Farnsworth resigned as MoviePass CEO and chairman while placing an offer for MoviePass assets and related businesses: Moviefone, MoviePass Films production company, MoviePass Ventures film co-acquisition unit.

On November 10, 2021, a bankruptcy judge allowed the sale of the company back to one of the original founders, Stacy Spikes. Spikes has announced that the company is exploring a relaunch.

=== 2022 relaunch ===
In August 2022, after co-founder Stacy Spikes reacquired the company, Spikes announced the service would relaunch. Its new pricing model would be a tiered system, with $10, $20, and $30 options, with variation by market. The firm announced there would be a waitlist with a limited number of users under its beta model, and its launch would differ from region to region based on engagement.

In September 2022, Insider reported that the Moviepass' beta relaunch will kick off in Chicago, Dallas and Kansas City starting on Labor Day, adding that the subscribers can watch up to five movies in a month. A week prior to this announcement, the company said that more than 775,000 people signed up to the waitlist.

In January 2023, MoviePass raised seed financing led by Animoca Brands for an undisclosed amount. MoviePass said it plans to use the new funding to accelerate the beta relaunch of its movie theatre subscription service, and to develop and implement the company's Web3 strategy, which includes virtual reality cinema experiences and using technology to drive traffic to theaters. As of January 2023, the MoviePass beta version is live in nine U.S. markets including Atlanta, Chicago, Dallas, Houston, Indianapolis, Kansas City, Oklahoma City and Tampa Bay.

== Accolades ==
MoviePass was named as one of the "25 Most Disruptive Apps of 2012" and part of "The Best of Everything in 2012" by Business Insider. The 2017 change in business model was successful in attracting customers; the service reported having 2 million subscribers in February 2018. That same month, the company announced at the Sundance Film Festival that it would also acquire and distribute films under the new subsidiary, MoviePass Ventures.

== Operation ==
Subscribers to MoviePass were issued a branded prepaid debit card. Using the MoviePass mobile app, users checked-in at a supported cinema, and selected a film and showtime occurring within the next 30 minutes; the card was automatically loaded with the amount of money needed to purchase a single ticket from the cinema for that film. The user then purchased their ticket as usual, using their MoviePass card as their payment method. Hence, the service was subsidizing the purchase of tickets directly from the cinema by the customer. Some cinemas supported e-tickets through MoviePass. MoviePass said that its service was supported at 91% of U.S. cinemas. One regional dine-in chain, Studio Movie Grill, made an investment in MoviePass, and partnered to pilot features such as food ordering from within the app.

The service went through several pricing structures following its original invite-only launch (including those limited to two or three films per month, and "unlimited" plans, with pricing based on market size), before announcing in August 2017 that it would switch to offering a plan with a single film per day priced at $9.95 per month. The change in business model came with the acquisition of a majority stake in the company by an analytics firm, which sought to widen the service's reach so it could collect more information on customer viewing habits.

The MoviePass service had several limitations. It could not be used for screenings in specialty formats such as 3D or IMAX. The service also did not support advance purchase of tickets, and only allowed solo purchases. Effective April 2018, a user could only use MoviePass on a particular film once. As of July 2018, certain screenings had possible additional fees based on demand.

== Criticism and controversies ==
The business model of MoviePass faced notable resistance from major cinema chains since its launch; the company's 21-theatre pilot in San Francisco was called off after objections by AMC Theatres and Landmark Theatres, who were included in the slate of locations without their knowledge. Stacy Spikes explained to Deadline Hollywood that he "imagine[d] a day where studio executives can see real-time decisions that subscribers are making from their phones and devices. If studios say they are not interested in being able to talk to their customers, knowing what they are thinking and being able to notify them of things like ancillary items, and that theater owners aren't interested in having these people go to the movies more, and drive up concessions sales, and having us put all this in the palms of their hands, then I'm in the wrong business."

Following the announcement of MoviePass' new pricing model in August 2017, AMC stated that it was "actively working now to determine whether it may be feasible to opt out and not participate in this shaky and unsustainable program", as "by definition and absent some other form of other compensation, MoviePass will be losing money on every subscriber seeing two movies or more in a month", and that lowering its prices in response to the service would harm the customer experience. The service's original pricing depended on a business model similar to those of health clubs, where the company would profit more if customers paid for the service but only used it on occasion. On March 13, 2019, MoviePass executive VP Khalid Itum departed the company. Itum had assumed day-to-day control of the service since November 2018.

In an effort to limit costs during the height of the service's popularity, MoviePass CEO Mitch Lowe directed the product team to implement three programs that were designed to artificially throttle users' benefits. First, they forcibly reset the passwords for approximately 75,000 of the most active user accounts under the false pretense of detecting "suspicious activity". When these users tried to change their passwords, the system would be non-functional, leading to service outages of a week or more. Second, they implemented a "random" audit process where some users would be required to take a photograph of their ticket stub to verify that they had actually watched the movie. In truth, these audits targeted the 450,000 most active users and the verification process was prone to errors, sometimes leading to closure of the account. Third, they added a hidden "trip wire" for users who saw more than three movies in a month which prevented them from using the service at all when this undisclosed limit was reached. Other executives who were aware of the programs feared consumer backlash and a Federal Trade Commission (FTC) investigation if they were ever discovered. The FTC filed a legal complaint against MoviePass over these deceptive business practices, who chose to settle the case in 2021.

On August 20, 2019, cybersecurity firm SpiderSilk informed MoviePass of a data breach involving sensitive data including credit card numbers for tens of thousands of MoviePass users.

== MoviePass Ventures ==
On January 19, 2018, at the Sundance Film Festival, MoviePass announced the new subsidiary MoviePass Ventures, which would co-acquire films with traditional distributors. Lowe explained that the company wanted to "bring great films to the big screen across the country for our subscribers", and that "given the successes we have demonstrated for our distributor partners in ensuring strong box office in the theatrical window, it's only natural for us to double down and want to play alongside them – and share in the upside."

MoviePass Ventures' first acquisition (in partnership with The Orchard), Bart Layton's American Animals, was on June 1, 2018, while their second, Gotti starring John Travolta as the titular mob boss, was released on June 15, 2018. The MoviePass Venture operation was questioned by some in the industry, with one independent studio head telling Deadline Hollywood: "It used to be in distribution, we'd all gossip whether a studio was buying tickets to their own movie to goose their opening, but in the case of MoviePass, there's no secret: They're literally buying the tickets to their own movie". According to MoviePass' own reports, the service made up 25–35% of American Animals' opening weekend ticket sales, and around 40% of Gotti's.

=== MoviePass Venture films ===
It was noted that the MoviePass Ventures film Gotti had large disparities between critic and audience scores on Rotten Tomatoes, with most of the positive reviews coming from new users, and those whose only other review was of fellow release American Animals. This led to allegations that MoviePass was attempting to manipulate reviews in order to bolster the service.

Title	Release date	Director	Production companies	Distributor
American Animals	June 1, 2018	Bart Layton	Film4; AI Film; Raw production; Lava Bear Films	co-distributed with The Orchard
Gotti	June 15, 2018	Kevin Connolly	Emmett/Furla/Oasis; Highland Film Group; Fiore Films	co-distributed with Vertical Entertainment

== MoviePass Films ==
In May 2018, Helios and Matheson Analytics, the parent company of MoviePass, acquired the option to purchase the assets of Emmett/Furla Oasis plus gain its executives' expertise in making films for a new subsidiary, MoviePass Films. The new company would be 51% owned by Helios and the remainder by EFO. By early August 2018, Helios and Matheson completed the acquisition of Emmett Furla Oasis Films assets for the MoviePass subsidiary, MoviePass Films. The first film produced under the MoviePass Films was announced to be 10 Minutes Gone starring Bruce Willis, which the first of a three film pact with Willis. In late September 2018, the company acquired equity stakes and co-distribution in two films distributed by Neon to be released soon.

In March 2019, The Boies/Schiller Film Group filed suit on Tuesday, accusing Emmett/Furla Oasis Films of breaching a deal to produce Escape Plan sequels starring Sylvester Stallone. According to the suit, Boies/Schiller put up a $6 million loan for the $65 million project. The arrangement also gave Boies/Schiller rights to finance and produce the sequels, Escape Plan 2: Hades and Escape Plan: The Extractors. Boies/Schiller alleges that Emmett/Furla Oasis Films breached that agreement, and did not allow Boies/Schiller to put up financing for the sequels. The suit claims Emmett/Furla also failed to pay an executive producing fee on each of the two movies.

Oasis Ventures Entertainment sued MoviePass Films on October 14, 2019, over the theft of films and for lack of consent from Oasis in making the deal with Helios and Matheson.

MoviePass Films was the final company to bear the MoviePass name after MoviePass was shut down in 2020, thus being Boss Level the last released film of the company in 2021. Originally they had acquired American Traitor: The Trial of Axis Sally but after its closure they will no longer produce it, the rights of the film were transferred to Vertical Entertainment and Redbox Entertainment.

=== MoviePass Films ===
Title	Release date	Director	Production companies	Distributor
A Vigilante	March 10, 2018	Sarah Daggar-Nickson	Emmett/Furla/Oasis; Pulse Films; Uncorked Productions; FilmScience	Saban Films
Escape Plan: The Extractors	July 2, 2019	John Herzfeld	Emmett/Furla/Oasis; Highland Film Group; Diamond Films Productions; Leomus Pictures; The Fyzz; Ingenious Media	Lionsgate/Summit Entertainment/Grindstone Entertainment Group (United States) Universal Pictures (International)
10 Minutes Gone	September 27, 2019	Brian A. Miller	Emmett/Furla/Oasis; Diamond Film Productions; Highland Film Group	Lionsgate/Grindstone Entertainment Group
Boss Level	March 5, 2021	Joe Carnahan	Highland Film Group; Emmett/Furla/Oasis; Diamond Film Productions; The Fyzz; Ingenious Media; WarParty Films	Hulu

=== Acquired films ===
Title	Release date	Director	Notes
Monsters and Men	September 28, 2018	Reinaldo Marcus Green	Equity stakes & co-release with Neon
Border	May 10, 2018	Ali Abbasi	Equity stakes & co-release with TriArt Film
Villains	September 20, 2019	Dan Berk Robert Olsen	Equity stakes & co-release with Gunpowder & Sky and Bron Studios
The Reckoning	August 20, 2020	Neil Marshall	Equity stakes & co-release with Highland Film Group

== See also ==
- Sinemia – Social platform and subscription-based service for film tickets
