= Dirty (Malina Moye album) =

Album by Malina Moye

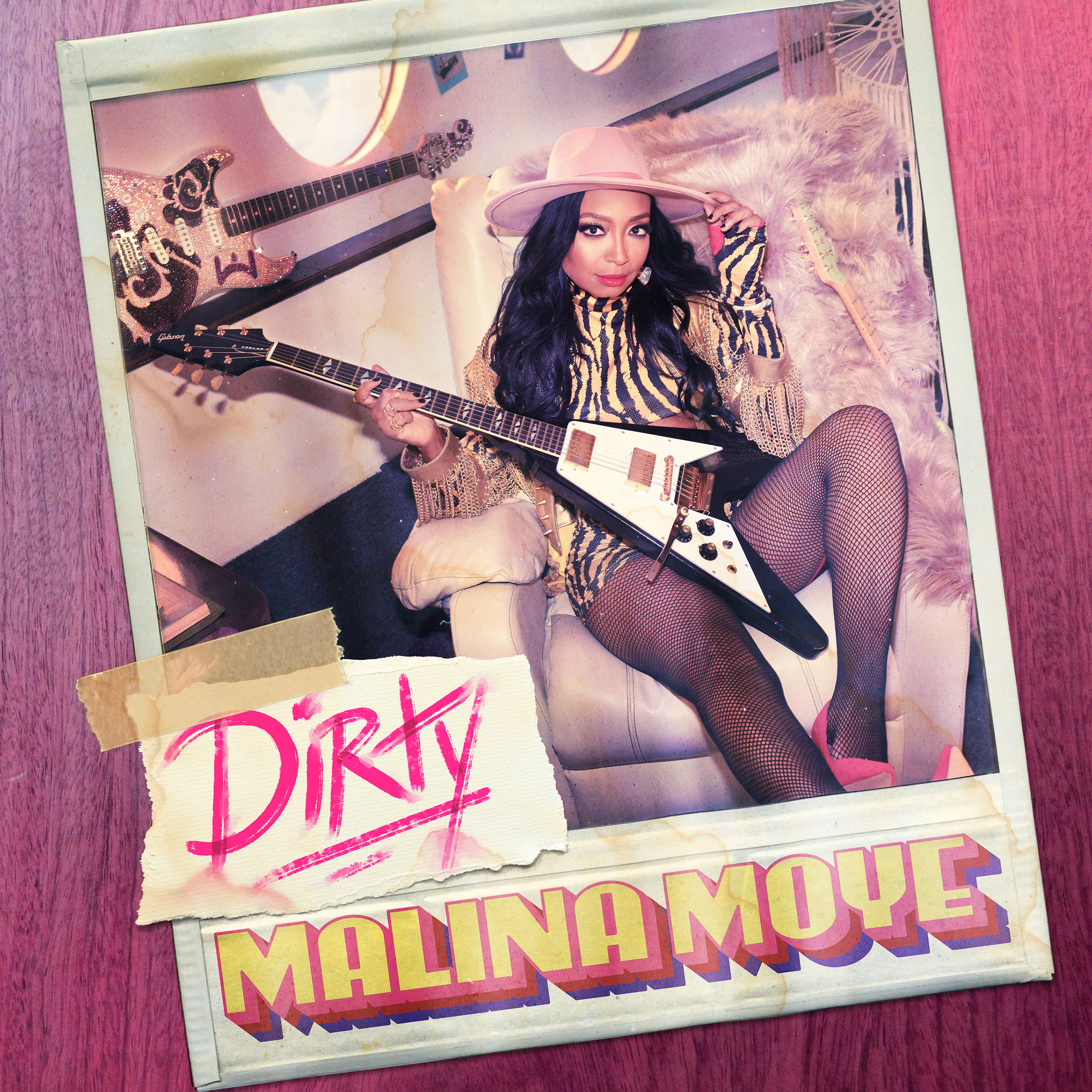

Studio album by Malina Moye
- Released: March 17, 2023
- Genre: pop rock, blues, rock, funk
- Length: 39:20
- Label: WCE Records, The Orchard
- Producer: Björn 'Polarbear' Soderberg, Malina Moye

Malina Moye chronology
Bad As I Wanna Be (2018)	Dirty (2023)

Singles from Dirty
- 1. "Say My Name" Released: January 18, 2023; 2. "F.I.N.E" Released: March 13, 2023

Dirty is the fourth album from singer-songwriter-guitarist Malina Moye. The album was released worldwide on March 17, 2023, landing at number 12 on the Billboard Blues chart marking Moye's eighth appearance on the chart. Dirty was also voted into the top five Best Guitar Albums of 2023 by Guitar World Magazine. Moye toured extensively in Europe and the United States making stops at Eric Clapton’s Crossroads Festival, the I Made Rock 'N' Roll Festival and the Ellnora Guitar Festival.

== Background ==
Moye stated in an AXS TV interview that the theme of the album is "taking the high road when others do you wrong, which is so hard to do." Dirty continues with Moye's signature sound of blues, rock, pop, and soul. Guitar Player Magazine called the instrumental single "F.I.N.E" a "blues-rock opus.". The music video for "F.I.N.E" was released on March 13, 2023.

The album's first single "Say My Name" was released on January 18, 2023, with the music video directed by award-winning filmmaker Marc Fusco.

In its March 2023 print issue, American Songwriter Magazine stated that "it's a nine-track surge through emotive blues instrumentals like "F.I.N.E.", flirtatious songs like "Obsexxed", nods to past greats like her cover of Led Zeppelin's "D'yer Mak'er" and pronouncements like "What Do You Stand For".

While promoting the album, Moye played the national anthem for the 2022 Vikings vs Colts game at US Bank Stadium in Minneapolis now known as the greatest comeback in NFL history and also played the national anthem for the Los Angeles Lakers in honor of Lebron James becoming the all-time leading scorer in NBA history. Moye made her NASCAR debut playing the national anthem at Sonoma Raceway on Fox and also played the Cleveland Browns onto the field in a first-of-its kind Rock & Roll Hall of Fame themed game at Huntington Bank Field in a game against the Cincinnati Bengals. The game activities featured Rock And Roll Hall of fame inductees Ozzy Osborne, Zakk Wylde, Foreigner, Flavor Flav, and Robert "Kool "Bell from Kool and the Gang.

All the tracks on Dirty were written by Malina Moye with the exception of D'yer Mak'er, and produced by Bjorn "Polarbear" Soderberg and Moye. In 2024, AXS TV and Spin Magazine listed Moye as one of the top left-handed guitarists of all time and one of the 30 most famous left-handed players in the world. Moye was also featured at the Rock and Roll Hall Of Fame's Revolutionary Women exhibit unveiled in March 2024 for Women's History Month.

== Track listing ==
1. "Y.A.T.O (You Ain't the One)" - 3:38
2. "F.I.N.E (F*cked Up, Insecure, Neurotic, and Emotionally Unstable)" – 4:43
3. "Over Ur Lies" – 3:43
4. "Say My Name" – 3:52
5. "D'yer Mak'er" – 4:16
6. "Courage" – 5:51
7. "Dirty" – 3:11
8. "Obsexxed" – 3:16
9. "What Do You Stand For" – 6:42

== Charts ==
Chart performance for Dirty
Chart (2023)	Peak position
US Top Blues Albums (Billboard)	12
