= Are You the One (Malina Moye song) =

"Are You The One"

Single by Malina Moye

from the album Rock & Roll Baby
- Released: March 4, 2016
- Genre: R&B, Soul
- Length: 3:29
- Label: WCE Records/BDG/RED
- Songwriter(s): Malina Moye, Antonio Daniels
- Producer(s): Bjorn Soderberg (Remix), Grant Nicholas

"Are You the One" is the third single from Malina Moye's Rock & Roll Baby album. The remix of the single was released March 4, 2016 and was the second-most added song at the Urban Adult Contemporary radio format upon its release. The single was remixed by Bjorn Soderberg also produced Moye’s previous singles "Alone" and "Girlfriend." Singersroom stated that “Moye is considered one of the top female guitarists in the world, and has carved out her own lane in today’s music scene as one of the few artists able to straddle both Rock and Soul genres.”

“As for a ballad like ‘Are You the One,’ Moye offers up a mid-tempo beat before she kicks down the door with blazing fretwork,’ stated Fender.

All Access calls the single a "hit." It debuted at No. 32 on Billboard 's national Adult R&B airplay chart. The "Are You The One" music video premiered on Guitar World on February 14, 2015, and was directed by the independent film director Marc Fusco. Moye toured Europe in early 2016 and the United States in support of the hit single.
