= Armor (film) =

2024 film by Justin Routt

- Theatrical release poster
- Directed by: Justin Routt
- Written by: Cory Todd Hughes; Adrian Speckert
- Produced by: Randall Emmett; Joel Cohen; Gwen Osborne
- Starring: Sylvester Stallone; Jason Patric; Josh Wiggins; Dash Mihok
- Cinematography: Cale Finot
- Edited by: Marc Fusco
- Music by: Yagmur Kaplan
- Production companies: Grindstone Entertainment Group; Convergence Entertainment Group
- Distributed by: Lionsgate Films
- Release dates: October 30, 2024 (Philippines); November 22, 2024 (United States)
- Running time: 89 minutes
- Country: United States
- Language: English
- Box office: $665,598

Armor is a 2024 American action thriller film directed by Justin Routt and starring Sylvester Stallone, Jason Patric, Josh Wiggins, and Dash Mihok. The film tells the story of a father and son who work as security guards on an armored truck. They are robbed on a bridge and must try to survive and escape.

Armor was simultaneously released in theaters and on demand in the United States on November 22, 2024.

== Plot ==
Since the tragic death of his wife, James Brody has appeared to be battling alcoholism and has even hosted anonymous Alcoholics Anonymous meetings, but in reality, he has never quit drinking. During the Mississippi summer, James, who worked as an armored truck security guard, and his son Casey were forced to break regulations and take an extra box of packages from a credit union.

They were quickly stopped by seven armed thugs, causing the armored truck to overturn on the bridge. James and Casey were trapped inside the truck after killing three of the attackers; Casey was shot in the leg. The armed thugs, led by Rook, demanded the gold in an extra package in exchange for a ride to the hospital, but James refused because he didn't trust them.

Rook and his crew planned to drill a hole in the car door, but James seized the opportunity to burn Tex, who was in charge of drilling, to death.

Rook's hot-tempered accomplice Smoke betrayed him, shooting Rook and another accomplice, Echo, before throwing the armored truck into the river. When James and Casey swam ashore, Smoke attacked James, but Rook, who survived, shot and killed Smoke. As the gold sank into the river, Rook asked James and Casey to pretend he didn't exist as the police were about to arrive. After James agreed, Rook left alone.

== Cast ==
- Sylvester Stallone as Rook
- Jason Patric as James Brody
- Josh Wiggins as Casey Brody
- Dash Mihok as Smoke
- Blake Shields as Tex
- Joshua Davis Whites as Echo
- Jeff Chase as Viper
- Erin Ownbey as Trisha Brody
- Joel Cohen as Frank
- Deirdre V. Lyons as FBI Agent Gannon
- Vahik Pirhamzei as Ohan 'The Ghost' Petros

== Production ==
Filming occurred in Pearlington, Mississippi and Waveland, Mississippi in September 2023. Since filming occurred during the 2023 SAG-AFTRA strike, the filmmakers were granted interim agreements which gave them permission to make the film.

Crew members dispute the directorial credit Routt received for the film alleging that Randall Emmett coordinated several production elements while remaining unlisted on call sheets and avoiding the spotlight. According to props assistant Michael Castro, "He (Routt) literally was pretending he was directing the scene that was going on - looking at the monitor and then looking over at the action and making hand movements to make it look like he was telling people what to do. It was all make-believe."

== Release ==
=== Theatrical ===
Armor was first released in the Philippines on October 30, 2024. It was released day-and-date in the United States on November 22, 2024.

== Reception ==
=== Critical response ===
On the review aggregator website Rotten Tomatoes, 0% of 24 critics' reviews are positive, with an average rating of 3.4/10.

On Variety, Dennis Harvey wrote that "neither its staging nor its performances transcend the limitations of Adrian Speckert and Cory Todd Hughes’ script, leaving mediocre material unredeemed by any special thrills, style, or character detailing."
