= Jennifer Garner filmography =

Performances by American actress

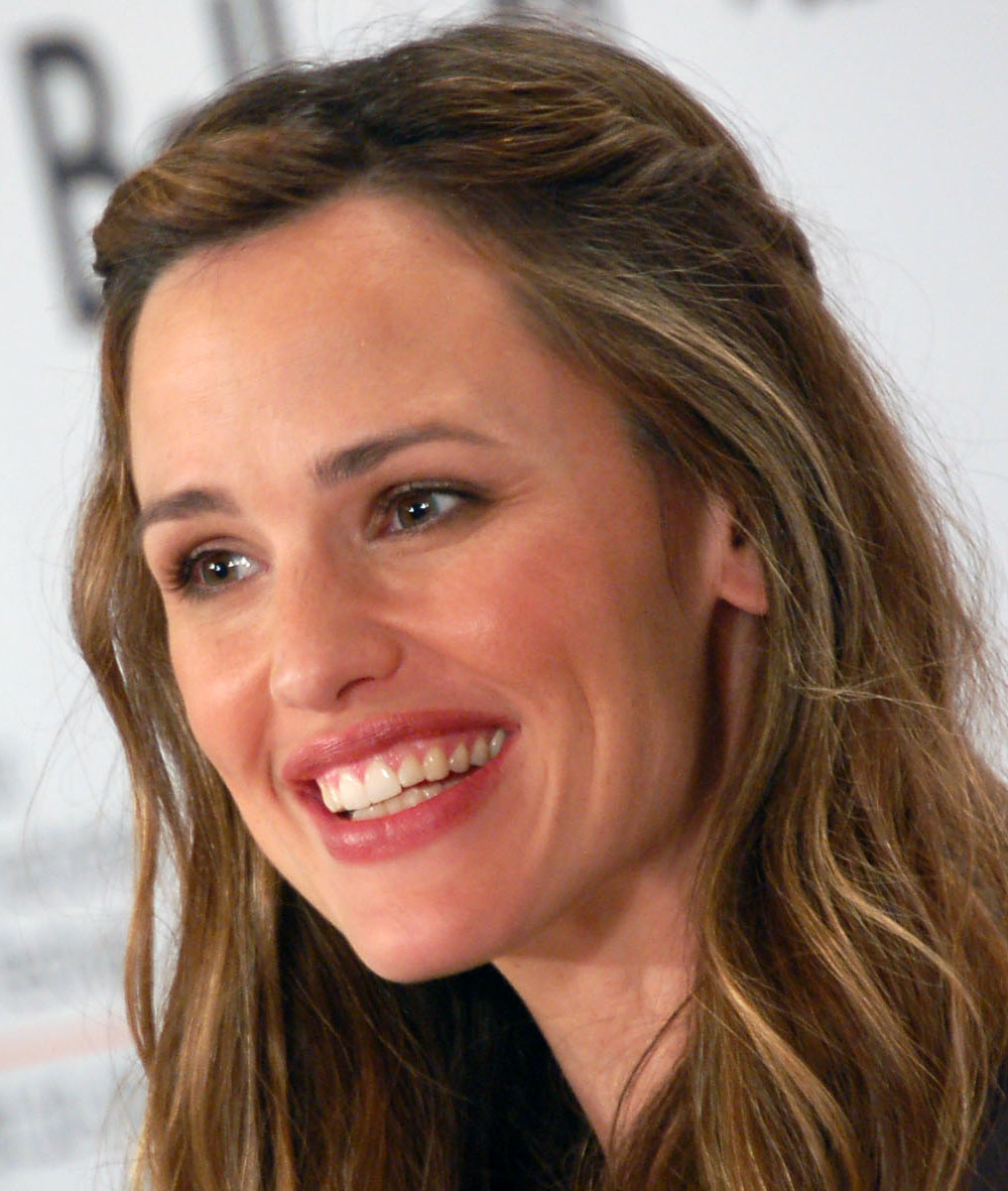
Garner at a press conference for The Invention of Lying at the 2009 Toronto International Film Festival

The following is the complete filmography of American actress and producer Jennifer Garner.

== Film ==
Key
| † | Denotes film or TV productions that have not yet been released |

| Year | Title | Role | Notes | Ref. |
|---|---|---|---|---|
| 1997 | In Harm's Way | Kelly | Short film | |
| 1997 | 1999 | Annabell | | |
| 1997 | Deconstructing Harry | Woman in Elevator | | |
| 1997 | Washington Square | Marian Almond | | |
| 1997 | Mr. Magoo | Stacey Sampanahoditra | | |
| 2000 | Dude, Where's My Car? | Wanda | | |
| 2001 | Stealing Time | Kiley Bradshaw | | |
| 2001 | Pearl Harbor | Nurse Sandra | | |
| 2002 | Catch Me If You Can | Cheryl Ann | | |
| 2003 | Daredevil | Elektra Natchios | | |
| 2004 | 13 Going on 30 | Jenna Rink | | |
| 2005 | Elektra | Elektra Natchios | | |
| 2006 | Catch and Release | Gray Wheeler | | |
| 2007 | The Kingdom | Janet Mayes | | |
| 2007 | Juno | Vanessa Loring | | |
| 2009 | Ghosts of Girlfriends Past | Jenny Perotti | | |
| 2009 | The Invention of Lying | Anna McDoogles | | |
| 2010 | Valentine's Day | Julia Fitzpatrick | | |
| 2011 | Arthur | Susan Johnson | | |
| 2011 | Butter | Laura Pickler | Also producer | |
| 2012 | Serena | Serena | Short film | |
| 2012 | The Odd Life of Timothy Green | Cindy Green | | |
| 2013 | Dallas Buyers Club | Dr. Eve Saks | | |
| 2014 | Draft Day | Ali Parker | | |
| 2014 | Men, Women & Children | Patricia Beltmeyer | | |
| 2014 | Alexander and the Terrible, Horrible, No Good, Very Bad Day | Kelly Cooper | | |
| 2015 | Danny Collins | Samantha Leigh Donnelly | | |
| 2016 | Miracles from Heaven | Christy Beam | | |
| 2016 | Mother's Day | Dana Barton | | |
| 2016 | Nine Lives | Lara Brand | | |
| 2016 | Wakefield | Diana Wakefield | | |
| 2017 | A Happening of Monumental Proportions | Nadine | | |
| 2017 | The Tribes of Palos Verdes | Sandy Mason | | |
| 2018 | Love, Simon | Emily Spier | | |
| 2018 | Peppermint | Riley North | | |
| 2019 | Wonder Park | Mrs. Bailey (voice) | | |
| 2021 | Yes Day | Allison Torres | Also producer | |
| 2022 | The Adam Project | Ellie Reed | | |
| 2023 | Family Switch | Jess Walker | Also producer | |
| 2024 | Deadpool & Wolverine | Elektra Natchios | | |
| 2024 | The Battle for Brandon | Narrator | Documentary | |
| TBA | One Attempt Remaining † | TBA | Filming | |

== Television ==
| Year | Title | Role | Notes |
|---|---|---|---|
| 1995 | Zoya | Sasha | Television film |
| 1996 | Harvest of Fire | Sarah Troyer | Television film |
| 1996 | Dead Man's Walk | Clara Forsythe | Recurring role |
| 1996 | Swift Justice | Allison | Episode: "No Holds Barred" |
| 1996 | Law & Order | Jaime | Episode: "Aftershock" |
| 1996 | Spin City | Becky | Episode: "The Competition" |
| 1997 | The Player | Celia Levison | Television film |
| 1997 | Rose Hill | Mary Rose Clayborne | Television film |
| 1998 | Significant Others | Nell Glennon | Main role |
| 1998 | Fantasy Island | Sally | Episode: "Dreams" |
| 1998–2002 | Felicity | Hannah Bibb | 3 episodes |
| 1999 | Aftershock: Earthquake in New York | Diane Agostini | Miniseries |
| 1999 | The Pretender | Billie Vaughn | Episode: "Pool" |
| 1999–2000 | Time of Your Life | Romy Sullivan | Main role |
| 2001–2006 | Alias | Sydney Bristow | Main role; also producer (17 episodes); also director (Episode: "In Dreams...") |
| 2003 | Mad TV | Herself | Episode: "8.15" |
| 2003 | The Simpsons | Herself (voice) | Episode: "Treehouse of Horror XIV" |
| 2003–2013 | Saturday Night Live | Herself | 2 episodes |
| 2011 | A Poem Is... | Narrator | 2 episodes |
| 2013 | Martha Speaks | Jennifer (voice) | Episode: "Too Many Marthas" |
| 2018–2019 | Llama Llama | Mama Llama (voice) | Main cast |
| 2018 | Camping | Kathryn McSorley-Jodell | Main cast |
| 2019 | Ask the StoryBots | Cell Tower Operators | Episode "How Do Cell Phones Work?" |
| 2020 | Home Movie: The Princess Bride | Princess Buttercup / The Ancient Booer | Episode: "Chapter Seven: The Pit of Despair" |
| 2020 | Make It Work! | Herself | Television special |
| 2022 | Upload | Officer Jennifer Garner | Episode: "Download" |
| 2023 | Party Down | Evie Adler | Main cast (6 episodes) |
| 2023—present | The Last Thing He Told Me | Hannah Hall | Main role; also executive producer |
| 2026—present | The Five-Star Weekend | Hollis Shaw | Main role; also executive producer |

== Theatre ==
| Year | Title | Role | Venue | Notes |
|---|---|---|---|---|
| 1995 | A Month in the Country | Verochka / Katya | Criterion Center Stage Right | Understudy |
| 2007 | Cyrano de Bergerac | Roxane | Richard Rodgers Theatre | |
| 2024 | Gutenberg! The Musical! | Producer | James Earl Jones Theatre | One night only |

== Video games ==
| Year | Title | Role | Notes |
|---|---|---|---|
| 2004 | Alias | Sydney Bristow (voice) | |
