= Burn (2019 film) =

2019 American thriller film by Mike Gan

- Theatrical release poster
- Directed by: Mike Gan
- Written by: Mike Gan
- Produced by: Jordan Yale Levine; Jordan Beckerman; Sukee Chew; Russ Posternak; Michael J. Rothstein; Ash Christian
- Starring: Tilda Cobham-Hervey; Suki Waterhouse; Harry Shum Jr.; Shiloh Fernandez; Josh Hutcherson
- Cinematography: Jon Keng
- Edited by: Marc Fusco
- Music by: Ceiri Torjussen
- Production companies: Yale Productions; Film Mode Entertainment; Inwood Road Films; Particular Crowd
- Distributed by: Momentum Pictures
- Release date: August 23, 2019 (United States)
- Running time: 88 minutes
- Country: United States
- Language: English
- Box office: $25,373

Burn is a 2019 American psychological comedy crime thriller film written and directed by Mike Gan. It stars Tilda Cobham-Hervey, Suki Waterhouse, Harry Shum Jr., Shiloh Fernandez and Josh Hutcherson.

It was released on August 23, 2019, by Momentum Pictures to mixed or average reviews.

== Plot ==
Melinda begins the graveyard shift as an attendant at a gas station. A man named Billy parks his stolen vehicle outside and enters the store with a concealed handgun. A police officer named Liu pulls up and strikes up a conversation with Melinda. Later, as Liu purchases coffee, Melinda takes a photo of him, and her coworker Sheila catches her in the act. Melinda drops her phone, breaking the screen, and Liu consoles her before being called away on an alert. Sheila bullies Melinda into showing her the multiple photos she has taken of Liu.

Upon returning from a break, Melinda finds Billy engaging Sheila in a robbery. In a rather jovial manner, he demands cash and demonstrates that his gun is real by firing it when she doubts him. Billy is disappointed by the small amount of cash in the register and Melinda offers to empty the safe for him. Returning with a backpack of money, she tells Billy she wants to go with him. A struggle ensues when she refuses to hand over the backpack until he agrees. Billy wrestles the backpack from Melinda, but Sheila berates him as he leaves, angering him. He grabs her and forces her to the ground, ordering Melinda to lock the doors and go into the bathrooms. Billy hauls Sheila to the break room and begins beating her, but Melinda sneaks up behind him and throws the pot of coffee in his face. Scalded, he accidentally fires his gun, killing Sheila before Melinda hits him over the head with a fire extinguisher, knocking him out. When he awakens, he finds himself strapped to a chair as Melinda quietly mops up the blood.

Melinda and Billy converse and she gets him a cigarette, aspirin and water. She gives him some pills, but he realizes that she has given him cheap erectile medication instead of aspirin. She proceeds to tape his eyes and mouth shut and attempts to rape him. He struggles and he is able to rip the tape holding one of his arms, knocking Melinda away. Still blind, he tries chasing after her, but knocks himself out again. Melinda takes his gun and the backpack and cleans up the room.

Melinda quietly unlocks the front door for a customer, who berates her for not having any coffee. Melinda puts the gun to her chin briefly before breaking down and sobbing, telling the customer to leave her alone. Perry, Sheila's boyfriend, then shows up to give her a ride home and finds her phone on the floor. Melinda tells him that Sheila left with another man. Once Perry leaves, Melinda steps out back to find somewhere to bury the bodies when some bikers arrive looking for Billy. She claims not to have seen him and will not let them enter the store. After an armed standoff, the bikers leave.

Realizing she cannot access the surveillance data to destroy it, Melinda begins filling containers with gasoline. Liu then returns, recognizing Billy's car as stolen. He questions Melinda, who says she has not seen anything suspicious, but Liu calls the manager for access to the surveillance data. Melinda fails to stop Liu from searching the store, but finding nothing, he leaves. Billy has escaped, leaving only zip ties behind. Melinda begins dousing the store with gasoline when she hears Billy entering the store and hides. He disables the power, which locks the front doors just as Perry returns, suspicious about Sheila's disappearance. Billy escapes through the back door and barricades it with dumpsters before strangling Perry. Melinda calls Liu and admits that she needs help as Billy rams Perry's car into the front doors, shattering the glass.

Backed into a corner, Melinda pleads with Billy to simply take the money and leave, but he wants revenge. He fires his gun, which ignites the gas and engulfs him in flames. Melinda grabs a fire extinguisher and escapes through the front door as Liu and other officers arrive. He helps Melinda into his car and comforts her.

== Cast ==
- Tilda Cobham-Hervey as Melinda
- Josh Hutcherson as Billy
- Suki Waterhouse as Sheila
- Harry Shum Jr. as Officer Liu
- Shiloh Fernandez as Perry
- Keith Leonard as Daryl
- Angel Valle as Cory
- John Hickman as Bruce
- Wayne Pyle as Fred
- Winter-Lee Holland as Doris
- Rob Figueroa as Phillip
- Doug Motel as Howard
- James Devoti as Dominic
- Joe James as Marcus
- Malina Moye as police dispatcher

== Production ==
In February 2018, it was announced Tilda Cobham-Hervey, Suki Waterhouse and Josh Hutcherson had joined the cast of the film, with Mike Gan directing from a screenplay he wrote. In March 2018, it was announced Shiloh Fernandez and Harry Shum Jr. joined the cast of the film. In May 2018, it was announced the film had been re-titled from Plume to Burn.

=== Filming ===
Principal photography began in March 2018.

== Release ==
It was released on August 23, 2019, by Momentum Pictures.

== Reception ==
=== Box office ===
Burn grossed nothing in North America and $25,373 in other territories.

=== Critical response ===
On Rotten Tomatoes, the film has an approval rating of 50% based on 12 reviews, with an average rating of 6.6/10. On Metacritic, the film has a score of 50 out of 100, based on 4 critics, indicating "mixed or average" reviews.

Dennis Harvey of Variety wrote: "The problem is that writer-director Mike Gan's first feature, though competently handled in most departments, doesn't commit enough to any approach to fulfill its potential."
