= Are You the One? (disambiguation) =

Are You the One? is an American reality television series on MTV, in which young singles try to find love.

Are You the One or Are You the One? may also refer to:

== Music ==
- "Are You the One" (Malina Moye song), a 2016 single by Malina Moye
- "Are You the One?" (The Presets song), a 2005 single by The Presets

== Television ==
- Are You the One? Brasil, a Brazilian version of Are You the One? television series
- Are You the One? El Match Perfecto, a Mexican version of Are You the One? television series
- Are You the One? (German TV series)

== See also ==
- You Are the One (disambiguation)
- "(Are You) The One That I've Been Waiting For", a 1997 single by Nick Cave and the Bad Seeds
