= William Joseph (musician) =

American musician (born 1980)

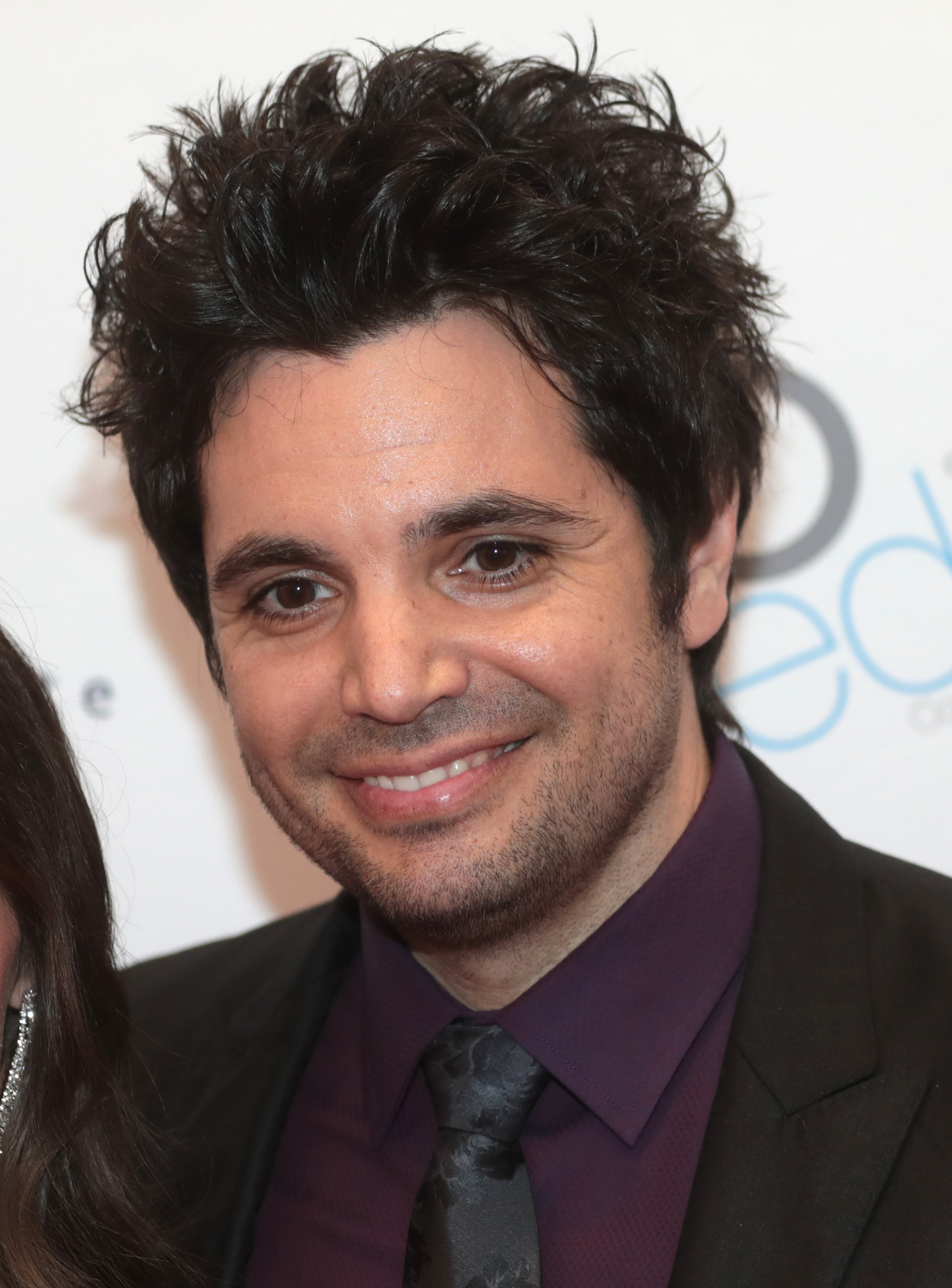

Background information
- Also known as: willy
- Born: William Joseph Schwartz III; 1980 (age 45–46); Phoenix, Arizona, United States
- Origin: instrumental
- Genres: Classical, Pop
- Occupations: pianist, composer
- Instrument: piano
- Years active: 2004–present
- Label: 143 Records (Reprise Records / Warner Music)
- Website: http://www.william-joseph.com

→ William Joseph Schwartz III (born 1980), better known as William Joseph, is an American pianist and recording artist from Phoenix, Arizona. He has released three studio albums: Within (2004), Beyond (2008) and Be Still (2012).

== Life and career ==
At age 8 Joseph won a full music scholarship provided by the Boys Clubs of America, enabling him to study piano with Russian pianist Stella Saperstein. Joseph is a member of the Church of Jesus Christ of Latter-day Saints.

He was the first teacher hired by Piano Warehouse in Phoenix, Arizona and taught for the company Arizona Music Lessons, later renamed the Arizona Music Academy, for which he still performs short teaching periods.

In 2003, Joseph performed at a charity event in his hometown and bumped into David Foster, for whom he played. Foster was impressed, and they began collaborating, eventually writing several songs together that would appear on 2004's Within, Joseph's major-label debut. By this time, Joseph was signed under Foster's 143 Records, a sub-label of Reprise Records and Warner Bros. Records.

In August and September 2004, Joseph opened for Josh Groban's "Closer Tour", covering 12 cities in the US and Canada, giving 16 concerts. During November and December 2005, Joseph was the opening act for Clay Aiken's "Joyful Noise Tour", which covered 36 cities in the US and Canada, giving 40 concerts.

2008 saw the release of Joseph's second album Beyond. In 2009, Joseph played an acoustic version of "Within" for BETA Records TV.

In 2012, he released his third album Be Still.

== Discography ==
Singles

- Safe & Sound (2012)
- Halo Theme Song (2013) with Lindsay Stirling
- Wanted (2013) featuring Colton Avery
- Bella's Lullaby (2013)
- Radioactive (2013)
- Jar of Hearts (2013) featuring Caroline Campbell
- Piano Fantasy (2013) featuring Caroline Campbell
- Miserlou (2016) featuring Tina Guo
- Nothing Else Matters (2016)
- A New Hope (2017)
- Mad World (2018)
- My Heart Will Go On (2018) featuring Caroline Campbell
- Bohemian Rhapsody (2018)
- La Vie En Rose (2018) with Caroline Campbell
- Drivers License (2021)
- Time After Time (2021)
- Anyone (2021)
- Be Still My Soul (2021)
- New Beginnings (2022)
- Take Me Home, Country Roads (2022)
- Walking in the Air (2023)
- Can't Help Falling in Love (2024)
- Thunderstruck (2024)

Albums

Album details	Track list
Within: Date released: August 10, 2004; Record label: 143 Records / Reprise Records; Producer: David Foster; Co-producer: Chris Boardman, Jochem Van Der Saag; Engineer: Humberto Gatica	1. "Within" – 3:02; 2. "Eternal" – 4:04; 3. "Stella's Theme" – 3:43; 4. "Butterflies and Hurricanes" – 3:45; 5. "Ave Maria" – 5:03; 6. "Kashmir (featuring Lucia Micarelli)" – 3:44; 7. "Homeward Bound" – 3:44; 8. "Piano Fantasy" – 4:26; 9. "Se Si Perde Un Amore" – 4:29; 10. "Dust in the Wind (featuring Garou)" – 3:41; 11. "Grace" – 3:37
Beyond: Date released: May 20, 2008; Record label: 143 Records / Reprise Records; Producer: Jochem Van Der Saag, William Ross; Executive Producer – David Foster; Engineer: Haydn Bendall, Jorge Vivo, Larry Goetz, Sasha Jankovic, Tim Bryson	1. "Standing The Storm" – 4:21; 2. "Beyond" – 4:04; 3. "Leningrad" – 4:27; 4. "Heroes" – 4:23; 5. "Once Upon Love (Featuring David Foster)" – 4:22; 6. "Kashmir" – 3:44; 7. "Sweet Remembrance Of You" – 3:29; 8. "Apasionada" – 4:02; 9. "Return With Honor" – 4:08; 10. "Cinema Paradiso" – 4:57; 11. "Asturias (Featuring Jesse Cook)" – 4:43; 12. "A Mother's Heart" – 3:39
Be Still: Date released: March 1, 2012; Producer: Russ Dixon	1. "Come Thou Fount" – 3:43; 2. "Be Still My Soul" – 3:57; 3. "Jesus Once of Humble Birth" – 4:10; 4. "A New Day" – 3:19; 5. "I Know That My Redeemer Lives" (Featuring Jenny Oaks Baker) – 4:39; 6. "With Royal Praise" – 3:49; 7. "God Be With You Still We Meet Again / He Is Risen" – 4:08; 8. "Nearer My God to Thee" – 4:10; 9. "How Great Thou Art" – 5:20; 10. "Silent Night" – 3:58; 11. "I Rest in You" – 4:03; 12. "Amazing Grace" – 4:01
