= You Are the One =

You Are the One or You're the One may refer to:

== Film and television ==
- You Are the One (Andy Warhol), a lost music video made by Andy Warhol in 1986
- You Are the One (film), a 2006 Filipino romantic comedy
- You Are the One (Singaporean TV series), a 2005 Singapore Chinese drama series
- You Are the One (Argentine TV series) (Sos mi vida), a 2006 Argentine romantic comedy TV series
- You're the One (2000 film) (Una historia de entonces), a Spanish film directed by José Luis Garci
- You're the One (1941 film), a 1941 musical film
- You're the One (TV series), a 1998 American sitcom

== Music ==
=== Albums ===
- You're the One (Paul Simon album), and the title song, 2000
- You're the One (Rhiannon Giddens album), 2023
- You're the One, by Lory Bianco, 1993

=== Songs ===
- "You Are the One" (A-ha song), 1988
- "You're the One" (The Black Keys song), 2007
- "You're the One" (Bonnie Tyler song), 1995
- "You Are the One" (C21 song), 2003
- "You Are the One" (Carl Smith song), 1956
- "You're the One" (Charli XCX song), 2012
- "You're the One" (Dondria song), 2009
- "You're the One" (Dwight Yoakam song), 1990
- "You're the One" (Greta Van Fleet song), 2018
- "You're the One" (Glen Campbell song), 1977
- "You're the One" (Little Sister song), 1970
- "You're the One" (Petula Clark song), notably covered by The Vogues, 1965
- "You Are the One" (Safia song), 2014
- "You're the One" (Sandeé song), 1987
- "You're the One" (Shane MacGowan and Máire Brennan song), 1995
- "You Are the One" (Shiny Toy Guns song), 2007
- "You're the One" (SWV song), 1996
- "You're the One" (Yoko Ono song), 1984
- "Tum Hi Ho" (lit. 'You Are the One'), by Arijit Singh from the Indian film Aashiqui 2, 2013
- "You Are the One", by Camel from The Single Factor
- "You're the One", by The Carpenters from Lovelines
- "You're the One", by Clannad from Anam
- "You Are the One", by Con Funk Shun from To the Max
- "You're the One", by Crazy Town from Darkhorse
- "You Are the One", by Elliott Yamin from the self-titled album
- "You're the One", by Guerilla Black from Guerilla City
- "You Are the One", by HIM from Deep Shadows and Brilliant Highlights
- "You're the One", by Hoobastank from Fornever
- "You're the One", by Julian Lennon from Mr. Jordan
- "You're the One", by Kana Nishino from To Love
- "You're the One", by Kate Bush from The Red Shoes
- "You're the One", by Magnum from Sleepwalking
- "You're the One", by The Marvelettes from Sophisticated Soul
- "You Are the One", by Mike + The Mechanics from the self-titled album
- "You're the One", by The New Seekers from Together
- "You Are the One", by Pet Shop Boys from Hotspot
- "You're the One", by Roy Orbison from King of Hearts
- "You Are the One", by Take That from Everything Changes
- "You Are the One", by S Club Juniors from Together
- "You're the One", by Sugarcult from Start Static
- "You Are the One", by Take That from Everything Changes
- "You Are the One", by TKA, 1989
- "You Are the One", by Toni Gonzaga, featuring Sam Milby, from You Are the One
- "You're the One", by Tracy Chapman from Let It Rain
- "You're the One", composed by Vincent Youmans, with lyrics by J. Russel Robinson and George Waggner
- "You're the One (For Me)", by Frank Sinatra
- "You're the One", by Elaine from Elements

== See also ==
- Are You the One? (disambiguation)
- If You Are the One (game show), a Chinese dating reality show
- "You're Still the One", by Shania Twain
