= Enough (Malina Moye song) =

2019 R&B song

Single by Malina Moye
- Released: June 28, 2019
- Genre: R&B, soul
- Length: 3:52
- Label: WCE Records
- Songwriter: Malina Moye
- Producers: Bjorn Soderberg, Malina Moye

"Enough" is an American R&B song written, co-produced and performed by Malina Moye. The song was released on June 28, 2019. Billboard called it an "empowering and a much needed song". The music video was directed by the filmmaker Marc Fusco and was premiered on Shonda Rhymes' Shondaland.

The single was released in conjunction with a campaign spearheaded by Moye called #IAMENOUGH. The campaign ran from April 28 to May 2019, when Moye asked everyone to put up an image of themselves with the hashtag #IAMENOUGH to celebrate who one is at this moment and to claim that one is perfect just the way one is. The campaign sparked a global movement when other celebrities such as Yolanda Adams, Shawn Stockman from Boyz II Men and Kathy Sledge from Sister Sledge posted images of themselves to their social media accounts.

The song is used in the film The Samuel Project. Moye encouraged everyone to buy the #IAMENOUGH shirt with all proceeds going to her foundation, DriveHope.org. Moye also added fuel to the campaign by adding "motivational speaker" to her titles while sharing her story about being homeless then achieving a number one Billboard album. She reinforced #IAMENOUGH with events such as GRRRL LIVE, She Rocks It at Live Nation headquarters, high schools and non-profit organizations around the US.
