= My Uncle Rafael =

- Theatrical release poster
- Directed by: Marc Fusco
- Written by: Scott Yagemann; Vahik Pirhamzei
- Based on: Rafael Keroo Gandzere by Vahik Pirhamzei
- Produced by: Anahid Avanesian; Michael Garrity; Vahik Pirhamzei; Randy Simon; Todd Slater
- Starring: John Michael Higgins; Missi Pyle; Vahik Pirhamzei
- Cinematography: Keith Holland
- Edited by: Marc Fusco
- Music by: Joey Newman; Christopher Westlake
- Production companies: World Entertainment Connections; Richmond Media Entertainment; The Nickel Palace
- Distributed by: Rocky Mountain Pictures; Slater Brothers Entertainment
- Release date: September 21, 2012
- Running time: 102 minutes
- Country: United States
- Language: English
- Budget: $1.3 million
- Box office: $234,830 (USA)

My Uncle Rafael is a 2012 film directed by Marc Fusco. The screenplay was written by Scott Yagemann and Vahik Pirhamzei, based on Pirhamzei's play Rafael Keroo Gandzere.

== Plot ==
A desperate TV producer convinces an old Armenian Uncle to star in a new reality show. Cultures collide when Uncle Rafael is thrown into the Schumacher family household where he has one week to save a broken and dysfunctional American family from falling apart. The only rule-everyone must follow his rules.

== Cast ==
- John Michael Higgins as Damon
- Missi Pyle as Blair
- Vahik Pirhamzei as Rafael/Hamo
- Anthony Clark as Jack
- Rachel Blanchard as Michele
- Carly Chaikin as Kim
- Ellington Ratliff as Photographer
- Giovanni Cirfiera as Pietro

== Reception ==
On Rotten Tomatoes the film has an approval rating of 20% based on reviews from 5 critics. On Metacritic the film has a score of 36 out of 100 based on 5 reviews, indicating "generally unfavorable" reviews.

Gary Goldstein of The Los Angeles Times: "My Uncle Rafael elicits plenty of goofy chuckles even as it regularly threatens to fly off the rails. The film, directed by Marc Fusco from a script by Scott Yagemann and star Vahik Pirhamzei (based on a character from Pirhamzei's stage plays), feels a bit made up as it goes along but, like the best send-ups, also never feels so far from the actual truth."

Nick Schager of The Village Voice: "The term "contrived" doesn't begin to capture the sheer nonsensicality of this sitcom setup, but more painful is Rafael's shtick, which involves delivering endlessly flat punchlines such as, with regard to the show, "A pilot? But I don't fly." When not broadly riffing about love, commitment, and Jay-Z and Kim Kardashian, Rafael heals everyone around him (all of them dull types, including the angry goth teen and misbehaving young son) with advice like "When you learn to love someone without condition, you will be loved in return"—nauseating platitudes that turn the film into a comedy of corny homilies."
