= Joey Newman =

American composer, orchestrator, arranger, and conductor

- Born: September 9, 1976 (age 50)
- Origin: United States
- Genre: Film score
- Occupations: Composer, orchestrator, musician, music producer
- Instruments: Guitar, bass, drums, keyboards
- Years active: 2001–present

Joey Newman (born September 9, 1976) is an American film composer, orchestrator, arranger and conductor working in the fields of film and television.

== Early life, family and education ==
Newman is a third generation film composer, born into a musical family. His father was Joe Frank Carollo, a Mississippi-born rock/R&B bass player who played with the T-Bones in the 1960s and the pop group Hamilton, Joe Frank & Reynolds in the 1970s. Newman's mother, Jenifer Newman, was a classically trained ballet dancer who danced with the New York City Ballet and the Boston Repertory Ballet. His grandfather was Lionel Newman, the Oscar-winning composer/conductor who headed 20th Century Fox's Music Department for 47 years after Lionel's older brother and nine-time Oscar winner, Alfred Newman, retired. Newman's cousins include composers Randy Newman, David Newman, Thomas Newman and Maria Newman. His family is of Jewish descent.

Raised in Los Angeles, California, Joey was drumming at the age of three, owning his first set of drums at the age of eight. At nine, he was chosen for the boys' chorus of The Los Angeles Master Chorale where he performed with The Deutsche Oper Berlin Company's production of Tosca and Die Tote Stadt, featuring Plácido Domingo. That same year, he performed in the boys' chorus of La Boheme at UCLA's Royce Hall. At the age of 11, he studied piano under the tutelage of Herb Donaldson. He began his serious approach to drumming under the instruction of veteran drummer, Michael Barsimanto.

Newman began composition studies at the Berklee College of Music in Boston, Massachusetts, where he earned a Bachelor of Music degree.

== Career ==
After college, Newman returned to Los Angeles where he began his career working in television with Emmy-winning composer W.G. "Snuffy" Walden. He co-composed the final seasons of the TV series Once and Again and Providence. Newman also provided orchestrations for Aaron Sorkin's The West Wing among other primetime dramas and sitcoms.

Newman has composed the music to features, network/cable television series, and video games. As a conductor and orchestrator, Joey has worked across the media spectrum including conducting alongside Michael Tilson Thomas and John Williams. From 2001–2006, Joey composed the orchestral score to NCsoft's Lineage, one of the biggest online role-playing games in history.

In 2003, Joey began a fruitful collaboration with his cousin Randy, providing orchestrations for the features Seabiscuit and Cars. He also conducted the music to the Disney California Adventure Park ride Monsters, Inc. Mike & Sulley to the Rescue! which his cousin, Randy, originally scored.

For six seasons, Joey composed the score to the everyday life of the Roloff family in TLC's docu-series, Little People, Big World, including the Grand Canyon episode in season 3 for which he was nominated for an Emmy Award for Outstanding Music Composition for a Series (Original Dramatic Score). Joey's music can be heard on the ABC comedy The Middle. He composed the score for the 2012 feature film Any Day Now and provided a string arrangement for Rufus Wainwright's song "Metaphorical Blanket".

Newman composed the score for the 2013 animated short film, Adam and Dog, directed by Walt Disney animator, Minkyu Lee; the film was Oscar-nominated. In late 2016, Newman composed the score to Stephen Vitale's Star Wars fan film Hoshino, starring Anna Akana. The film has over 4 million views on YouTube.

== Discography ==
- Avatar Aang: The Last Airbender (2026), Milan Records [co-conductor with Anthony Parnther]
- Toy Story 5 (2026) [score producer, conductor]
- Any Day Now (2012), Lakeshore Records
- My Uncle Rafael (2016), LaLaLand Records
- The Space Between (2012)
- Underscored: Music for the Human Condition (2009)
- Cars (2006) [orchestrator]
- An Unfinished Life (2005) [orchestrator, conductor]
- Stealing Time (2004), LaLaLand Records
- Seabiscuit (2003) [orchestrator]
