= John C. Miller =

American businessman

- Education: University of Redlands (BA); Stanford University (JD)
- Spouse: Caroline Campbell (m. 2005; div. 2018)
- Partner: Jennifer Garner (2022–present)
- Children: 2

John C. Miller is an American businessman and attorney serving as the Chairman of the investment company Cali Group and CEO of PopID (a Cali Group portfolio company).

== Early life and education ==
John C. Miller was raised in Los Angeles. Miller has a bachelor's degree in economics from the University of Redlands. After graduating from Stanford Law School with a JD, Miller was admitted to the California Bar.

== Career ==
Miller was vice president of intellectual property at the public pharmaceutical company Arrowhead Pharmaceuticals, from 2004 to 2010. In 2004 he co-authored The Handbook of Nanotechnology: Business, Policy, and Intellectual Property Law, in which Miller, Ruben Serrato, Jose Miguel Represas-Cardenas and Griffith Kundahl explore issues regarding commercial application of nanotechnology.

Miller is the founder, CEO and chairman of the Pasadena based investment company CaliGroup. CaliGroup invests in technology within restaurant and retail industries. In May 2026 the company's investing portfolio included CaliBurger, Miso Robotics, Super League Gaming, PopID, Antler, Kolo, Simon and Gatler Robotics.

CaliGroup's new technology is trialed at the CaliBurger chain of restaurants, offering solutions for "food production, delivery, take out and drive-thru". Miller aims to use robotics to "drive down costs associated with labor, especially turnover." In a Fox News interview in 2017, Miller said the robotic technology increased the quality, consistency and hygiene standards of food as "robots don't spit in food or contaminate food." He said employees' strengths were related to "social interaction" with customers. In response to the COVID-19 pandemic in 2020, Miller said body thermometer devices would check for feverish temperatures as customers entered CaliBurger's Pasadena store.

In 2020, Miller was included on Nation's Restaurant News' Power List.

== CaliBurger ==
CaliBurger is a fast-food restaurant with West Coast-styled fries, burgers, and milkshakes. The menu in certain locations includes vegan options with sauces and cheese, and patties by Beyond Meat.

Miller opened the first store in China with some friends. The company has locations in the United States, Mexico, China, Kuwait, Malaysia, Philippines, Qatar, Saudi Arabia, Spain, Sweden, Taiwan, and United Arab Emirates.

CaliBurger was sued by In-N-Out Burger in 2012 for selling "Animal Style" fries and serving milkshakes in palm-tree-print cups. The lawsuit was settled out of court and CaliBurger agreed to change their menu and decor.

Miller served as CaliBurger CEO for a brief period (2012 to 2014). CaliBurger has had two CEOs since then: Silas Adler and Jeffrey Kalt.

== Restaurant kitchen robotics ==
CaliBurger uses a robotic device named "Flippy" in its restaurants for certain types of food preparation. An upgraded version called "Flippy Robot-on-a-Rail" or "Flippy ROAR" was announced in October 2020. It is being implemented in 50 CaliBurger locations. In 2018, a Flippy robot was installed in food concession in Dodger Stadium. In July 2020, White Castle began trials with a Flippy robot in one of their restaurants in Chicago.

In 2020, Miso Robotics, a subsidiary of the CaliGroup, unveiled the next generation kitchen robot called Flippy 2.0, which is faster and more versatile than the previous model. Time magazine called it one of the best inventions of 2022. In 2022, Flippy 2.0 was installed in 100 White Castle locations and Jack in the Box began trials at a single location in San Diego. During the same year, Chipotle tested a tortilla chip making version named Chippy at a single location in Fountain Valley.

== PopID ==
Miller has served as the CEO of PopID, a facial recognition-based payment system, since 2018. Under his leadership, the company has expanded its services to multiple sectors, including restaurants and retail. The company has formed partnerships with businesses such as Whataburger and J.P. Morgan Payments, working to implement biometric payment systems.

PopID has also introduced its biometric payment technology at major international events, including the 2022 FIFA World Cup in Qatar and the Miami Grand Prix, where attendees were able to make contactless payments through facial recognition.

== Personal life ==
Miller married violinist Caroline Campbell in April 2005. He filed for divorce in June 2011, but they reconciled the following February. They filed divorce papers again in October 2014. In October 2016, they agreed to joint legal custody of their daughter Violet and son Quest. The divorce was finalized in November 2018.

Miller dated actress Jennifer Garner from mid-2018 to early 2020. According to sources and paparazzi photos, they restarted their relationship in April 2021 and have been together since.
