= Violet Affleck =

American health advocate (born 2005)

- Born: December 1, 2005 (age 20)
- Education: Yale University
- Occupation: Health spokesperson
- Parents: Ben Affleck (father); Jennifer Garner (mother)
- Relatives: Casey Affleck (uncle)

Violet Anne Affleck (born December 1, 2005) is an American spokesperson for global health issues. She is the daughter of actors Ben Affleck and Jennifer Garner.

== Early life ==
Violet Anne Affleck was born December 1, 2005, the daughter of actors Ben Affleck and Jennifer Garner. She was "raised out of the spotlight" and kept from using social media. She attends Yale University.

== Activist career ==
In 2024, Affleck testified against a mask ban proposed by Los Angeles mayor Karen Bass in a public hearing at a Los Angeles County Board of Supervisors meeting, saying that she contracted a post-viral condition, similar to long COVID, in 2019. In May 2025, she published "A Chronically Ill Earth: COVID Organizing as a Model Climate Response in Los Angeles" in the Yale Global Health Review.

On September 23, 2025, she addressed the United Nations on the subject of air pollution and the need for masking to prevent the spread of long COVID. She described herself as "furious" on the behalf of children who had contracted the condition. "It is a neglect of the highest order to look children in the eyes and say, 'We knew how to protect you and we didn't do it. We have access to a technology to prevent airborne disease, something that millions of our ancestors and millions of people around the world today would kill for, and we refuse to use it." In her speech, she characterized filtered air as a human right.
