= Diamonds & Guitars =

Studio album by Malina Moye
- Released: August 18, 2009
- Genre: Funk, rock, R&B
- Length: 35:31
- Label: WCE Records
- Producer: Bjorn Soderberg, Malina Moye, Marc Fusco

Malina Moye chronology
Diamonds & Guitars (2009)	Rock & Roll Baby (2014)

Singles from Diamonds & Guitars
- 1. "Alone" Released: 2009; 2. "Need Your Lovin" Released: 2008; 3. "Girlfriend" Released: 2007

Diamonds & Guitars is the debut album from American singer, songwriter and guitarist Malina Moye. The record was removed from retail outlets after WCE Records' distribution and marketing deal was signed with Sony's RED Distribution in 2013.

The album represents a gumbo of Moye's influences: hip hop, rock, funk and soul. Seventeen Magazine said "Her songs are in touch with her musical roots, yet are totally organic and fresh." BET stated the album is an "amalgamation of collective throwback with a contemporary edge." The album was also a part of Victoria's Secret's "Love Rocks LIFE IS PINK" campaign. To promote the album, Moye appeared on DL Hughley's Weekends at the D.L. and Emeril Lagasse's Emeril Live.

Notable tracks include "Ain't It a Shame" featuring Layzie Bone of Bone thugs & Harmony and "Alone". The track "Girlfriend" appeared in an episode of MTV's The Hills. "Alone" peaked at number 93 on the Billboard R&B/Hip-Hop Songs chart.

== Track listing ==
1. "Alone" - 3:40
2. "Girlfriend" – 3:19
3. "Nobody" – 2:57
4. "You're the 1" – 4:02
5. "Yaah!" – 3:11
6. "Need Your Lovin" featuring Big Steele – 3:28
7. "Hustler's Blues" – 3:22
8. "Ain't It a Shame" featuring Layzie Bone – 3:37
9. "K-yotic" – 4:23
10. "Sexxy Man" – 3:21
