= List of awards and nominations received by Jennifer Garner =

List of Jennifer Garner awards
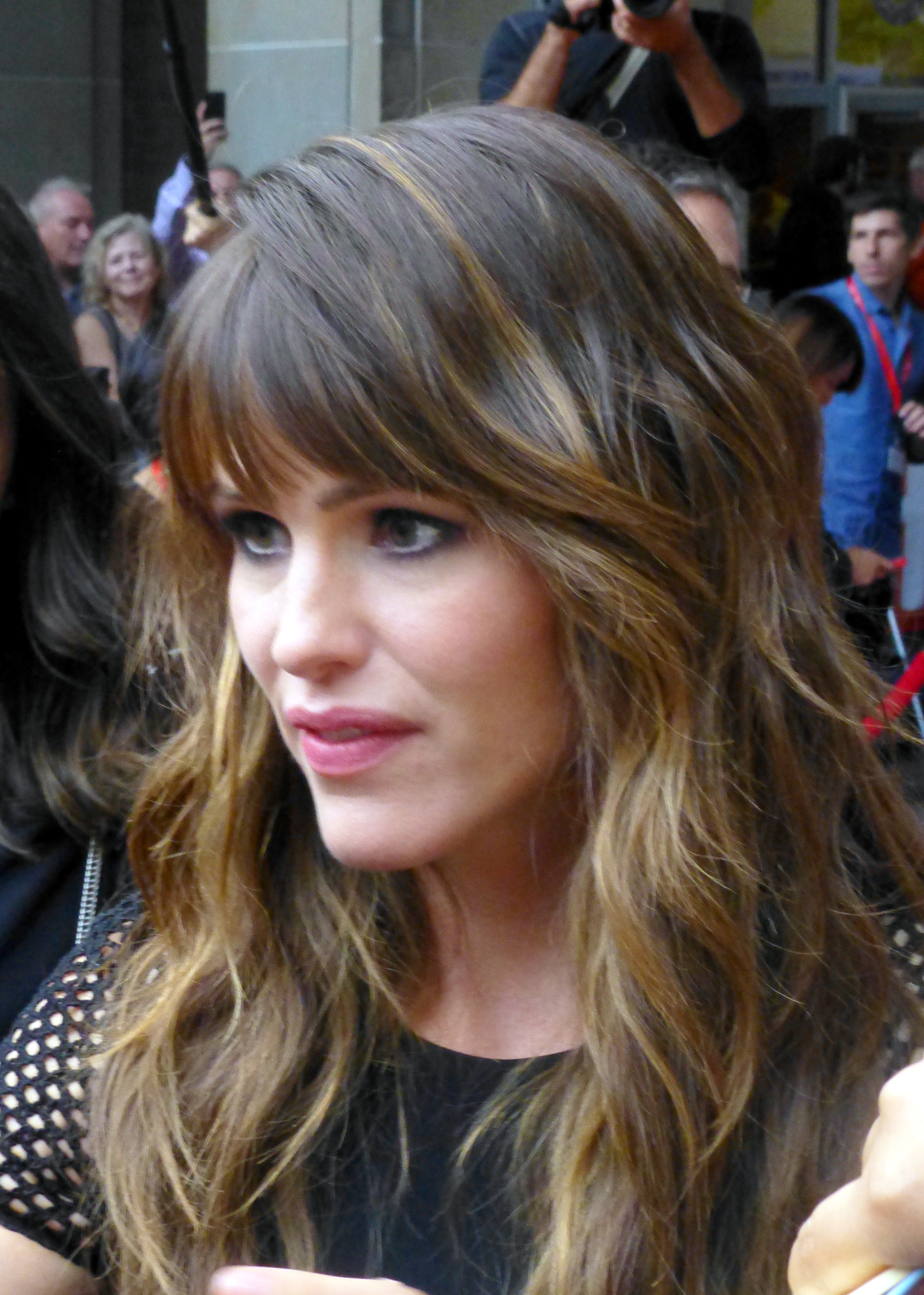
Award	Wins	Nominations
Golden Globe Awards	1	4
Primetime Emmy Awards	0	4
Screen Actors Guild Awards	1	3

The following is a list of awards and nominations received by American actress and producer Jennifer Garner.

== Major associations ==
=== Golden Globe Awards ===
Year	Category	Nominated work	Result	Ref.
2002	Best Actress – Television Series Drama	Alias	Won	
2003	Best Actress – Television Series Drama	Alias	Nominated	
2004	Best Actress – Television Series Drama	Alias	Nominated	
2005	Best Actress – Television Series Drama	Alias	Nominated	

=== Primetime Emmy Awards ===
Year	Category	Nominated work	Result	Ref.
2002	Outstanding Lead Actress – Drama Series	Alias	Nominated	
2003	Outstanding Lead Actress – Drama Series	Alias	Nominated	
2004	Outstanding Lead Actress – Drama Series	Alias	Nominated	
2005	Outstanding Lead Actress – Drama Series	Alias	Nominated	

=== Screen Actors Guild Awards ===
Year	Category	Nominated work	Result	Ref.
2004	Outstanding Performance by a Female Actor in a Drama Series	Alias	Nominated	
2005	Outstanding Performance by a Female Actor in a Drama Series	Alias	Won	
2014	Outstanding Performance by a Cast in a Motion Picture	Dallas Buyers Club	Nominated	

== Other awards and nominations ==
=== Critics' Choice Movie Awards ===
Year	Category	Nominated work	Result	Ref.
2008	Best Acting Ensemble	Juno	Nominated	

=== Critics' Choice Super Awards ===
Year	Category	Nominated work	Result	Ref.
2025	Best Actress in a Superhero Movie	Deadpool & Wolverine	Nominated	

=== Hasty Pudding Theatrical Awards ===
Year	Category	Nominated Work	Results	Ref.
2022	Woman of the Year	—N/a	Won	

=== MTV Movie & TV Awards ===
Year	Category	Nominated work	Result	Ref.
2003	Best Breakthrough Female Performance	Daredevil	Won	
2003	Best Kiss (shared with Ben Affleck)	Daredevil	Nominated	
2005	Best Musical Performance (shared with Mark Ruffalo)	13 Going on 30	Nominated	
2005	Best Kiss (shared with Natassia Malthe)	Elektra	Nominated	

=== Nickelodeon Kids' Choice Awards ===
Year	Category	Nominated work	Result	Ref.
2015	Favorite Movie Actress	Alexander and the Terrible, Horrible, No Good, Very Bad Day	Nominated	
2024	Favorite Movie Actress	Family Switch	Nominated	

=== Online Film Critics Society ===
Year	Category	Nominated work	Result	Ref.
2008	Best Supporting Actress	Juno	Nominated	

=== People's Choice Awards ===
Year	Category	Nominated work	Result	Ref.
2005	Favorite Hair		Won	
2005	Favorite Leading Actress	13 Going on 30	Nominated	
2005	Favorite Female TV Performer	Alias	Nominated	
2006	Favorite Female Action Star	Elektra	Won	
2006	Favorite Hair		Nominated	
2006	Favorite Female TV Performer	Alias	Won	

=== Satellite Awards ===
Year	Category	Nominated work	Result	Ref.
2003	Best Actress – Television Series Drama	Alias	Nominated	
2004	Best Actress – Television Series Drama	Alias	Nominated	
2005	Best Actress – Television Series Drama	Alias	Nominated	

=== Saturn Awards ===
Year	Category	Nominated work	Result	Ref.
2003	Best Actress on Television	Alias	Won	
2004	Best Actress on Television	Alias	Nominated	
2005	Best Actress on Television	Alias	Nominated	
2006	Best Actress on Television	Alias	Nominated	

=== ShoWest Awards ===
Year	Category	Nominated work	Result	Ref.
2004	Female Star of Tomorrow		Won	

=== TCA Awards ===
Year	Category	Nominated work	Result	Ref.
2003	Individual Achievement in Drama	Alias	Nominated	

=== Teen Choice Awards ===
Year	Category	Nominated work	Result	Ref.
2002	Choice TV Actress: Drama	Alias	Nominated	
2002	Choice TV: Breakout Actress	Alias	Nominated	
2003	Choice Movie Actress: Action	Daredevil	Nominated	
2003	Choice Movie: Breakout Actress	Daredevil	Nominated	
2003	Choice Movie: Chemistry (shared with Ben Affleck)	Daredevil	Nominated	
2003	Choice TV Actress: Drama	Alias	Nominated	
2004	Choice TV Actress: Action	Alias	Won	
2004	Choice Movie Actress: Comedy	13 Going on 30	Nominated	
2004	Choice Movie: Hissy Fit	13 Going on 30	Nominated	
2004	Choice Movie: Blush	13 Going on 30	Nominated	
2004	Choice Movie: Liplock (shared with Mark Ruffalo)	13 Going on 30	Nominated	
2004	Choice Movie: Chemistry (shared with Mark Ruffalo)	13 Going on 30	Nominated	
2005	Choice Female Red Carpet Fashion Icon		Nominated	
2005	Choice Movie Actress: Action	Elektra	Nominated	
2005	Choice TV Actress: Drama	Alias	Nominated	
2005	Choice TV: Chemistry (shared with Michael Vartan)	Alias	Nominated	
2006	Choice TV Actress	Alias	Nominated	
2016	Choice Movie Actress: Drama	Miracles from Heaven	Nominated	
