= Bad as I Wanna Be (album) =

Album by Malina Moye

Bad As I Wanna Be

Studio album by Malina Moye
- Released: March 23, 2018
- Genre: Funk, blues rock, pop rock
- Length: 21:31
- Label: WCE Records
- Producer: Björn ‘Polarbear’ Soderberg, Malina Moye

Malina Moye chronology
Rock & Roll Baby (2014)	Bad As I Wanna Be (2018)

Bad as I Wanna Be is the third album released by American singer/songwriter/guitarist Malina Moye, produced by Björn ‘Polarbear’ Soderberg. Moye stated to HuffPost that the album is about "celebration of self and being your own super hero." Parade Magazine said "Moye has proven herself once again as an über talented, electric guitar powerhouse." The record was released worldwide March 23, 2018 to critical acclaim after Moye made a promotional tour in Berlin, Cologne, Paris, London, and Amsterdam. The American version of the album has six songs and the European version has ten songs. The album reached number one for two weeks straight on the Billboard Blues chart published May 8 and 15, 2018.

"The collection contains six powerful songs, each unique in lyrical content and sound that showcase Moye's distinct fusion of rock, soul, pop, and funk," states Women's International Music Network. People Magazine declared Moye "one of the top guitarist in the world." Guitar World Magazine called the song Betta Than U" a "catchy, pulsating, riff-filled pop-rock anthem." Moye was on the cover of Guitarist Magazine France while also appearing in fashion magazines Madame Figaro, Vogue India, Vogue Italy, and Galore Magazine Germany.

Moye's empowerment song "Enough" premiered on Minnesota’s KCMP The Current 89.3, an NPR station, and stated that, "Malina reinvents the Minneapolis sound." Rolling Stone France gave the album 4 stars stating that "Moye blends, Blues, Funk, Rock and Pop." Moye also performed on Hollands's popular late night TV show RTL Late Night in February 2018 in support of the album's European release.

== Track listing ==
1. "Something to Say" - 3:39
2. "Jumpin'" – 3:26
3. "If 6 Were 9" – 4:08
4. "Betta>U" – 3:44
5. "Are You the One" – 3:33
6. "Little Rough" – 2:58
7. "Woman 2 Woman" – 4:08
8. "Run Free" – 3:44
9. "Enough" – 3:33
10. "K-yotic" – 2:58
