= Caroline Campbell =

American violinist

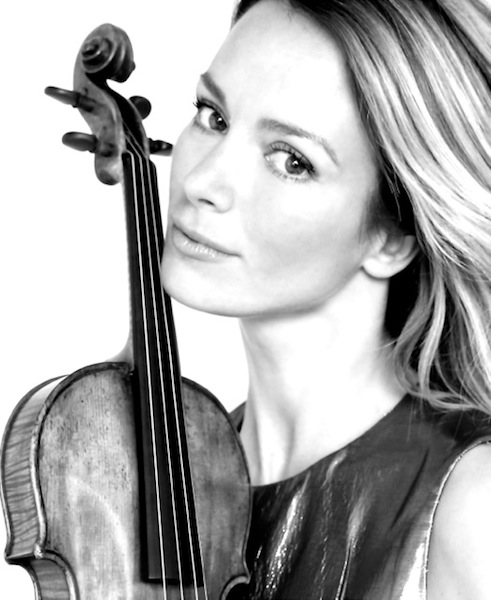

Background information
- Born: Albany, New York
- Genres: Classical, Pop, Rock
- Instrument: Violin
- Spouse: John C. Miller (m. 2005; div. 2018) Christopher Estwanik (m. 2021)

Caroline Campbell is an American violinist. She is a soloist and chamber musician who performs and records classical, jazz, film and popular music.

== Early life ==
Campbell was born in Albany, New York, and grew up in Hawaii, Nevada, and northern California. She began playing violin in a Suzuki method preschool class at age three. At age eight, she performed solo with the Reno Philharmonic Orchestra. As a senior in high school, she was selected as a Presidential Scholar and performed at the Kennedy Center.

She completed high school as a student in the Young Artists Program at the Cleveland Institute of Music, and continued collegiate work at the Cleveland Institute, where she studied with David Cerone and Donald Weilerstein. Campbell transferred to Stanford University in 2000. She studied computer science, logic, linguistics, and psychology. While at Stanford, she studied violin with Gennady Kleyman, the Soviet-born musician who chaired the university's violin department. In 2004, she graduated Phi Beta Kappa with a BS in symbolic systems and an MA in sociology.

== Career ==
Campbell has appeared as soloist with the Cleveland Orchestra, Los Angeles Philharmonic, Detroit Symphony, Houston Symphony, Indianapolis Symphony, and Dallas Symphony. She has soloed at Carnegie Hall, Kennedy Center, Sydney Opera House, Hollywood Bowl, and Barclays Center. She has performed duets with Andrea Bocelli, Sting, Michael Bublé, Chris Botti, Josh Groban, Rod Stewart, and Julio Iglesias.

Campbell performs regularly with jazz trumpeter Chris Botti, and is featured in Oblivion on Botti’s latest CD, Impressions. As a guest artist, she has toured five continents with Botti, and joined Barbra Streisand in her 2012 tour. Campbell was a featured guest artist with Andrea Bocelli on his 2012 U.S. tour and performed duets with him in his PBS Great Performances concert in Portofino, Italy, and in the film Love in Portofino.

Campbell is first violinist of the Los Angeles–based Sonus Quartet, a string quartet that fuses diverse musical styles. With the Sonus Quartet, Campbell performed with Stevie Wonder at the Library of Congress, recorded with Norah Jones for her album Little Broken Hearts, performed Crazy with Gnarls Barkley, and recorded film scores such as The Curious Case of Benjamin Button, Transformers: Revenge of the Fallen, Spider-Man, and The Lone Ranger.

Campbell is a founding member of Opus X, a classical musical foursome including Russian-Danish pianist Tanja Zapolski, British clarinetist Lone Madsen, and Japanese-American cellist Kristina Reiko Cooper. The group’s first single, Libertango, was released June 10, 2013. Opus X recorded its debut album with Grammy Award winning producer, Steven Epstein.

Campbell's debut CD, Truly, Simply, Deeply, was released in 2011. Her second CD, With Love from Hollywood, was released in July, 2013.

== Personal life ==
Campbell was married to American businessman and attorney, John Miller, with whom she has two children, daughter Violet and son Quest. The couple divorced in November 2018 after 13 years of marriage. In August 2021, Campbell married businessman and competitive distance runner Christopher Estwanik in Bermuda.
