= Malina Moye =

American singer-songwriter

- Moye performing at Star of the Desert Arena, Las Vegas, Nevada in 2009

Background information
- Born: August 20, 1984 (age 42)
- Genres: Rock, blues rock, pop rock, R&B, neo soul, funk
- Occupations: Singer-songwriter, musician, record label owner, actress
- Instruments: Lead guitar, vocals
- Years active: 2004–present
- Labels: WCE Records, BDG, RED Distribution
- Website: www.malinamoye.com

Malina Moye (born August 20, 1984) is an American singer-songwriter, lefty guitarist, actress, model, entrepreneur and businesswoman who fuses pop, rock, and soul. Widely cited as an influential, barrier-breaking artist for women in music, she has earned global acclaim as a modern guitar icon while establishing a highly successful career as a Billboard-charting songwriter and live performer. As a lefty, Moye draws comparisons to Jimi Hendrix, but plays her guitars flipped upside-down like Albert King. Moye founded WCE Records in 2004 and released four albums and fifteen singles. Fender guitars recognizes Moye as one of their first African-American left-handed upside-down female endorsee to join the Fender family and has been listed among the best guitarists of the 21st century by multiple publications, standing as one of the most important voices in Modern Guitar culture. Moye has shaped her image as a global recording artist and has made a cultural impact through fashion and branding in the mainstream market. Moye's fourth album Dirty was released worldwide on March 17, 2023, to critical acclaim landing on top of the Billboard blues chart,marking Moye's eighth appearance on the chart. Dirty was also voted into the top five of Guitar World Magazine's Best Guitar Albums of 2023 list. Malina's third studio album Bad as I Wanna Be was released March 23, 2018, reaching number one for two weeks straight on the Billboard Blues chart and landed on Billboard's Heatseakers Album Chart at number 19. Parade Magazine declared "Moye has proven herself once again as an über talented, electric guitar powerhouse." The song "Enough" premiered on Minnesota's KCMP The Current 89.3, an NPR station, and is also featured in the film The Samuel Project and was played in heavy rotation on MTV's Brand Spankin' New. Rolling Stone France gave the album four stars stating that "Moye perfectly blends, Blues, Funk, Rock and Pop."

In 2020 her single "Enough" had a resurgence with the Black Lives Matter movement and in 2021 the Rock and Roll Hall of Fame chose to feature Malina as one of today's most influential artists in the "Here And Now" exhibit at the museum alongside artists Janelle Monae, Taylor Swift, Harry Styles, and Drive-By Truckers. Also in 2021, Moye was featured in Bella Thorne's single Phantom. The music video garnered three million views in 48 hours and over one million views on triller in 24 hours. In July 2021, Dean Markley announced a historic partnership with Moye to release the Malina Moye Signature guitar strings, making her the first woman of color in history to have her own line of strings.

In 2024, AXS TV and Spin Magazine listed Moye as one of the Top left-handed guitarists of all time and one of the 30 most famous left-handed players in the world. Moye was also featured at the Rock and Roll Hall Of Fame's Revolutionary Women exhibit unveiled in March 2024 for Women's History Month. Moye made her NASCAR debut playing the national anthem at Sonoma Raceway on Fox and also played the Cleveland Browns onto the field in a first-of-its kind Rock & Roll Hall of Fame themed game at Huntington Bank Field in a game against the Cincinnati Bengals. The game activities featured Rock And Roll Hall of fame inductees Ozzy Osborne, Zakk Wylde, Foreigner, Flavor Flav, and Robert "Kool "Bell from Kool and the Gang. In 2026, Moye was a guest artist on the Grammy-nominated album "Colors In My Mind" at the 68th Grammy Awards. Further cementing her cultural impact as a modern guitar icon, Chris Brown and Usher featured Moye in a curated montage of influential women in music on their 51-date The R&B stadium tour alongside trailblazers Sister Rosetta Tharpe, Meshell N'degeocello, and Billie Holiday. In Summer of 2026, Malina partnered with Kramer Guitars (a Gibson brand) and launched the Malina Moye Pacer Deluxe making history as the first African American women with a signature guitar in Kramer's 50 year history and the first left-handed female guitarist with a signature guitar across all guitar manufacturers. The launch also served as the 50th anniversary of Kramer.

== Career ==
After releasing her single "Girlfriend" and cross-marketing it with her new calendar "Spend 12 Months With Malina Moye: Hot Fun in California Sun," she caught the attention of critics alike, who dubbed Malina a "Madonna-like ingénue of marketing". This helped land her song, "Girlfriend", on the R&B Hip-Hop Sales Billboard listing at number 43 for one week. Recently, Guitar World Magazine named Moye as one of the ten female guitarists in the world to know.

Moye's next single "Alone" was released independently, peaking at number 10 on the Billboard R&B Hip-Hop single sales chart, and remained on the chart for over twenty weeks. The song also reached number 93 on the Hot R&B Airplay chart and number 27 on the Billboard Hot 100. She has appeared on national TV shows including Weekends at the D.L., Emeril Live and morning shows such as Good Morning Chicago and Showcase Minnesota. In 2007, Moye was featured in the UK documentary Stratmaster: The Greatest Guitar Story Ever Told, alongside Robert Cray, Mark Knopfler, and Jimi Hendrix. Moye has also been seen on the catwalk and on the silver screen.

With her unorthodox style and musicianship, Moye received an invite to appear at the Robert Johnson Blues Festival as the only female singer, lefty guitarist on the roster, sharing the stage with last living blues musicians David "Honeyboy" Edwards, Hubert Sumlin, and Pinetop Perkins. In 2009, Moye opened for Robin Thicke and Boyz II Men on several US dates.

Along with playing at other notable festivals around the world, Moye serves as an ambassador to the King's Trust of King Charles III, to which she donated her song "Hustler's Blues" to the trust-supported, charitable Wilberforce compilation record released on AMD/Universal Music. With a soft digital release in 2009, Moye released Diamonds & Guitars. That fall Malina was also a part of Victoria's Secret's "Life is Pink" campaign and sang the National Anthem for more than 40,000 people at Petco Park for a Cubs vs. Padres baseball game. Moye also received her own day and a proclamation from the Mayor of her hometown for her musical contributions before performing at the Rock and Roll Hall of Fame and Museum in Cleveland honoring Michael Jackson.

In 2010 Moye played the National Anthem on the guitar at the sold-out Vikings/Cowboys game in her hometown of Minneapolis in front of 80,000 people, making history as the first woman, not to mention the first African-American woman, to play the anthem on electric guitar at any professional sports event. Also in 2010, Moye was named best dressed at the 52nd Grammy awards, wearing an electric blue dress by Kevan Hall.

In 2011, after playing the main stage at one of Europe's biggest rock festivals, Bospop, Moye headlined the west coast's largest peace concert "Artists for Peace" with Chaka Khan, Eric Benet, and Flora Martirosian honoring the iconic Stevie Wonder for his musical lifetime achievements and promoting world peace.

In 2012, Moye voted by Glamour Magazine as one of the best dressed at the Grammy Awards. Also that year, she joined the Experience Hendrix Tour as the only female guitarist with guitar greats such as Eric Johnson, Robert Randolph, Eric Gales, Brad Whitford, Kenny Wayne Shepherd, and Jonny Lang to all honor Jimi Hendrix. In the fall, Moye made her second appearance at the Rock and Roll Hall of Fame as a featured artist for the institution's tribute concert honoring Chuck Berry where she performed the song "Stop and Listen" to Berry and his wife Themetta "Toddy" Suggs in the audience. The show also featured such prominent music icons as Ernie Isley, Darryl McDaniels (DMC), Steve Jordan, Lemmy Kilmister, Vernon Reid, Earl Slick, Merle Haggard, and Joe Bonamassa to name a few.

In 2013, Moye signed a global marketing and distribution deal with Brody Distribution Group (BDG), distributed by RED Distribution (a division of Sony Music Corp). In the Summer, Moye performed a successful European tour promoting the first single "K-yotic" featuring Bootsy Collins from her 2014 album "Rock & Roll Baby." During the tour, Moye honored the Queen of England's 60-year reign with her rendition of "God Save The Queen" at the Goodwood Festival of Speed in West Sussex, culminating in a Royal flyover by the famed Red Arrows fighter jet squadron.

In 2014, Moye released Rock & Roll Baby. The first single "K-yotic" featuring Bootsy Collins was a viral hit that Billboard called "explosive" when it debuted on the Billboard Twitter 140 chart at No. 5, and at No. 11 on Billboard's Hot Singles Sales chart. Guitar World stated that "Moye's record is insanely good bringing a certain passion and feel to her guitar playing". Elmore Magazine said "Moye demonstrates once again she can play with the best of them fusing rock, blues, funk and soul…[her] new EP indeed shows the influence of Hendrix, while reaffirming her own unique sound." WNKU listed the record at No. 9 on its Top 89 Albums of 2014. Moye also appeared on the Arsenio Hall Show to support the album and played her rock anthem "A Little Rough" which peaked at no. 44 on Billboard's Social chart. In 2015, Moye appeared on the January cover of Asia's number one guitar magazine Gitar Plus, which named her the "Queen of funk rock".

== Personal life ==
In 2017, Moye became engaged to film director Marc Fusco.

== Discography ==
- Diamonds & Guitars (2009)
- Rock & Roll Baby (2014)
- Bad as I Wanna Be (2018)
- Dirty (2023)
