= Vahik Pirhamzei =

- Born: Tehran, Iran

Vahik Pirhamzei (Persian: واهیک پیرحمزه ای, Armenian: Վահիկ Փիրհամզեյի) is an Iranian-Armenian actor, producer, director, and writer who produces works in English, Armenian and Persian. His film My Uncle Rafael (2012), which was based after his play Rafael Keroo Gandzere, earned him national recognition and awards.

== Early life and education ==
Before moving to the United States in 1989, Vahik Pirhamzei lived in the suburbs of Tehran. He began drawing extensively when he was ten years old and later became involved in various forms of visual arts. He performed stories and puppet shows for his family and friends.

After the fall of the Shah and the Pahlavi dynasty in 1978–79, Vahik was forced to leave his hometown. He moved to Mettmann, Germany in 1988, where he registered for painting classes in local schools.

Vahik arrived in Los Angeles in 1989, engaging in auditions and freelance work on cable TV programs for Iranian viewers in Southern California. He wrote, directed, and starred in various comedy sketches such as; "Nika's Café", "The Specialist" and "Moshkelat.com" depicting the immigrant life in Los Angeles. He appeared in over 300 of his own comedy skits. Since then, Vahik has contributed widely to the Iranian community theatre in L.A. He has starred in more than 25 stage productions, as well as performed in various locations throughout the United States, Canada, and Europe.

== Career ==
In 2020, Vahik launched a new production and film services company Nico Nazar Creative with filmmaker Marc Fusco.

In 2018, Pirhamzei directed the coming of age feature comedy "10E " from his screenplay with Menua Minasian. It garnered a limited theatrical release in the Fall of 2019 and opened with the highest per screen average in the United States during the September 27 weekend opening. The film was then acquired by Gravitas Ventures and released in North America on all streaming and Video On Demand platforms. Featured at the 2019 Pomegranate Film Festival, 10E along with Pirhamzei were honored with the POM Scholastic Award

In October 2016 Vahik brought his play Look Me in The Eye to the stage with the collaboration between the actors from Armenia, Luiza Nersisyan and Sos Janibekyan with the diaspora Armenian actors, Anahid Avanesian and himself created a refreshing dynamic on stage for the Los Angeles Armenian community of theater goers.

In 2016, Pirhamzei filmed 3 Weeks in Yerevan in Armenia. The movie premiered in Armenia and the United States.

In 2014, Pirhamzei completed his full-length feature film "Guardian Angel."

In 2013 Vahik Pirhamzei wrote, directed, and starred in the feature film "Guardian Angel" and won Golden Pom Award from Pomegranate Film Festival Awards in Toronto. In 2013 Pirhamzei directed and produced a music video for Russian actress Kristina Orbakaitė and Armenian pop singer Tata.

In 2012, Pirhamzei co-wrote a spin-off of "The Garden of Uncle Rafael" with Scott Yagemann as a feature film, My Uncle Rafael. The film included cast members John Michael Higgins, Missi Pyle and Rachel Blanchard and was directed by Marc Fusco, who formerly worked with Steven Spielberg. The film followed a desperate TV producer convincing an old Armenian Uncle to star in a reality show. Cultures clash when Uncle Rafael is thrown into the Schumacher family household, a dysfunctional American family in the midst of falling apart. Pirhmazei won the Best Screenplay and Best Actor Awards from ARPA International Film Festival for My Uncle Rafael. It also earned the Best Director Award for Marc Fusco.

Later in 2012, Pirhamzei wrote, directed, and produced "Don't Say Goodbye", short film/music video with Eric Roberts for Googoosh. He also wrote, directed, and produced "Ejaz" (Miracle) for Googoosh in 2012.

In 2010, Pirhamzei released a new play called Man Ravanshenas Lazem Nadaram ("I Don't Need a Psychologist"). In the year that followed (2011), he wrote yet another play "Honest Liars" and then followed it up with "Experienced Liars" in 2012.

Vahik staged his play "Mez Lavootchoon Chi Egell" ("Nothing Good Has Come Our Way"). Vahik played his best known character, Rafael Keri (Uncle Rafael), a 72-year-old, quick-witted Armenian senior living in L.A. Two spin-off productions called "Rafel Keroo Gandzer'e" ("The Treasures of Uncle Rafael") and its sequel; "Rafael Keroo Bardez" ("Uncle Rafael's Garden") took the stage, depicting the life of Uncle Rafael and his dysfunctional, yet amusing family. Vahik wrote, produced, directed, and starred in both productions.

In 2000 Pirhamzei debuted "The Richmond Comedy Club" on TV. In 2004, he launched a weekly entertainment magazine news show called "World Entertainment Connections".

After Vahik's first original production "Sky Blue" was staged in Los Angeles, he began receiving offers to present more of his work. He directed several music videos for Iranian, Armenian, and other Middle Eastern artists. He worked with L.A. Iranian artists, including Moein, Googoosh, Dariush, Kamran & Hooman, Armenian pop musicians Armenchik and Tata Simonyan and Russian star Kristina Orbakaitė.

== Filmography ==
=== Actor ===
- 10E (2019) as "Robert"
- 3 Weeks in Yerevan (2016) as "Armen"
- Guardian Angel (2014) as "Ray Ardalan"
- My Uncle Rafael (2012) as "Rafael" and "Hamo"
- Immigrants (2009, TV Series) as "Andy Gregorian"
- Surviving Paradise (2000) as "Mo"

=== Writer ===
- 10E (2019)
- Guardian Angel (2014)
- My Uncle Rafael (2012)

=== Producer ===
- Dig as Co-Executive Producer (2022)
- Slayers as Co-Producer (2022)
- Code Red: Youth of a Nation as Co-Producer (2022)
- 10E (2019)
- 3 Weeks in Yerevan (2016)
- Guardian Angel (2014)
- My Uncle Rafael (2012)
- World Entertainment Connections (2005)

=== Director ===
- 10E (2019)
- 3 Weeks in Yerevan (2016)
- Guardian Angel (2014)
- World Entertainment Connections (2005)

=== Editor ===
- Slayers (2022)

== Awards ==
- 2011 - Breakthrough Performance Award from Arpa Film Festival for actor's performance in My Uncle Rafael (AFFMA)
- 2011 - Best Screenplay Award from Arpa Film Festival for My Uncle Rafael screenplay
- 2011 - Audience Choice Award from Pomegranate Film Festival in Toronto for the movie My Uncle Rafael
- 2013 - Golden Pom Award from Pomegranate Film Festival in Toronto for the movie Guardian Angel (2014)
- 2015 - World Armenian Entertainment Awards
- 2019 - POM Scholastic Award
