= The Samuel Project =

2018 American film by Marc Fusco

- Directed by: Marc Fusco
- Written by: Marc Fusco; Chris Neighbors; Steven Mark
- Produced by: Jeff Deverett; Steven Mark; Jane Hare; Rebecca Reyes
- Starring: Hal Linden; Ryan Ochoa; Mateo Arias; Michael B. Silver; Ken Davitian; Liza Lapira; Catherine Siggins
- Cinematography: Stephen Sheridan
- Edited by: Marc Fusco
- Music by: Joey Newman
- Distributed by: in8 Releasing
- Release date: September 28, 2018
- Running time: 92 minutes
- Country: United States
- Language: English

The Samuel Project is a 2018 family comedy drama film directed by Marc Fusco and written by Fusco, Chris Neighbors and Steven Mark. The film stars Hal Linden, Ryan Ochoa and was shot in San Diego, California.

== Plot ==
A high school teen reconnects with his Jewish grandfather and creates art based on his experience in The Holocaust.

== Cast ==
- Hal Linden
- Ryan Ochoa as Eli Bergman
- Mateo Arias
- Michael B. Silver
- Ken Davitian
- Liza Lapira
- Catherine Siggins

== Production ==
=== Development ===
In an interview with AARP, Linden talks about distancing the film from Schindler's List. He states “so the movie became less of a Holocaust picture and more about a boy pursuing his dream of being an artist. [...] The Samuel Project is about three generations that don’t communicate much — it isn’t until art tells the story that you get communication.”

=== Casting ===
Fusco cast Linden, Lapira and Bowgen during the time they were performing in Steve Martin's Picasso at the Lapin Agile at San Diego's Old Globe Theater.

=== Filming ===
Principal photography took place in March and April 2017 in San Diego. "Action traveled to the streets of Hillcrest, a pawn shop on University Avenue, the Chuck Jones Gallery in the Gaslamp, Balboa Park, a La Jolla estate masquerading as a Newport Beach mansion, a farm in Ramona, Shelter Island Cleaners, and more."

== Themes ==
Dave McNary of Variety said "Through art, the film explores how Jewish immigrants struggled to find new homes in the U.S. following World War II and explores themes of the universal struggle for acceptance and opportunity with direct relevance to today’s headlines."

== Release ==
The Samuel Project had a limited release on September 28, 2018, and expanded to nationwide on October 5, 2018. The film opened to 25 markets and was distributed by in8 Releasing and selected by AMC Independent. Fusco said "Audiences are hungry for independent, character-driven films like ours which are a refreshing alternative to the big blockbuster franchises."

== Reception ==
=== Critical response ===
Kimber Myers of the Los Angeles Times said "Despite its flaws, The Samuel Project is likely to make an impact on open-hearted audiences, with extra credit due Linden for an authentic performance in line with the actor's body of work." Tim Appelo of AARP scored it 3 out of 5 and said "It could use more of grandpa's drama and less teen dramedy, but it's heartwarming." John Delia of Aced Magazine called it "a very good inspirational film" scoring it 4 out of 5 stars.

=== Accolades ===
The family-friendly film won three San Diego Film Awards, Best Narrative Feature, Best Actor for Hal Linden and Best Director for Marc Fusco. Ryan Ochoa was also nominated for Best Actor.

== See also ==
- List of media set in San Diego
