= Marc Fusco =

American film director

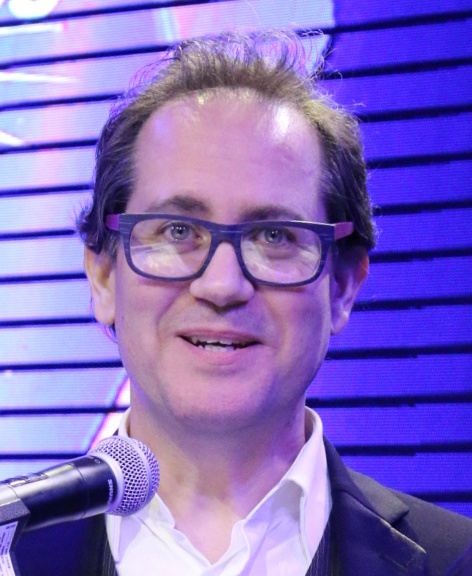
- Fusco in 2019
- Education: Hempfield High School; Pennsylvania State University
- Occupations: Film director; screenwriter; film editor; film producer
- Years active: 2004-present
- Notable work: Burn: My Uncle Rafael; The Samuel Project; Stealing Time

Marc Fusco is an American film director, screenwriter and film editor known for Stealing Time, My Uncle Rafael, and The Samuel Project.

== Life and career ==
Fusco was born to Nicola Fusco, an Italian immigrant, and Jane Fusco, and grew up in Lancaster, Pennsylvania. He graduated from Hempfield High School in 1989 and Pennsylvania State University in 1993. After working as production assistant at Amblin Entertainment, Fusco was handpicked by Steven Spielberg to work closely as the director's personal assistant in 1997. For over five years, he assisted the Spielberg on the films The Lost World: Jurassic Park, Amistad, Saving Private Ryan. During his tenure with Spielberg, Fusco and co-writer Chris Perkins sold the screenplay The Reel Killers to DreamWorks.

Fusco also directed the short film The Interview that premiered at the 1998 Venice International Film Festival. He edited the suspense film Burn starring Josh Hutcherson and Suki Waterhouse, Confession starring Michael Ironside, the vampire horror-comedy Slayers starring Thomas Jane and Abigail Breslin, Dig starring Emile Hirsch and Thomas Jane, and The Samuel Project starring Hal Linden and Ryan Ochoa. Fusco later launched the production company Nico Nazar Creative with filmmaker Vahik Pirhamzei.

=== 2012-2019 ===
In 2012, My Uncle Rafael was released theatrically earning over $230,000 at the box office. Prior to My Uncle Rafael, Fusco directed and co-wrote the Stealing Time, a film he said took about five years to complete.

In 2016, Fusco co-founded the Drive Hope Foundation with the mission to expand the minds of underserved youth to consider careers outside of their own difficult circumstances. He was engaged to singer-guitarist Malina Moye in 2017. By 2018, The Samuel Project was purchased for worldwide distribution. The film was released theatrically in over 80 cities from 2018–2019 through the theatrical distribution company in8 Releasing that Fusco co-founded in 2018.

== Filmography ==
=== Film ===
Year	Film	Director	Writer	Editor	Producer	Notes
2004	Stealing Time	Yes	Yes	No	No	co-writer
2012	My Uncle Rafael	Yes	No	Yes	No	
2018	The Samuel Project	Yes	Yes	Yes	No	co-writer
2019	Burn	No	No	Yes	No	
2022	Confession	No	No	Yes	No	
2022	Code Red: Youth Of The Nation	No	Yes	Yes	No	
2022	Dig	No	No	Yes	No	
2022	Slayers	No	No	Yes	Yes	co-producer
2023	Helen's Dead	No	No	Yes	No	
2024	Cash Out	No	No	Yes	No	
2024	Armor	No	No	Yes	No	
2025	High Rollers	No	No	Yes	No	
2026	The Gentleman Thief	No	No	Yes	No	
