= Rock & Roll Baby =

EP by Malina Moye
- Released: October 14, 2014
- Genres: Funk, rock
- Length: 21:28
- Label: WCE Records/BDG/RED
- Producers: Grant Nicholas, Malina Moye, John Taylor

Malina Moye chronology
Diamonds & Guitars (2009)	Rock & Roll Baby (2014)	Bad as I Wanna Be (2018)

Singles from Rock & Roll Baby
- 1. "K-yotic" Released: 2014; 2. "Are You the One" Released: 2015

Rock & Roll Baby is an EP from American singer/songwriter/guitarist Malina Moye. The first single “K-yotic” featured Rock and Roll Hall of Fame’s funk legend Bootsy Collins which Billboard called "explosive" debuted on Billboard Twitter 140 chart at #5, and at #11 on Billboard’s Hot Singles Sales chart. Guitar World stated that “Moye's record is insanely good bringing a certain passion and feel to her guitar playing." Elmore Magazine said “Moye demonstrates once again she can play with the best of them fusing rock, blues, funk and soul…[her] new EP indeed shows the influence of Hendrix, while reaffirming her own unique sound.” WNKU listed the record at #9 on its Top 89 Albums of 2014. Moye also appeared on the Arsenio Hall Show to support the album and played her rock anthem "A Little Rough" which peaked at no. 44 on the Billboard Social chart. In 2015, Moye appeared on the January cover of Asia's number one guitar magazine Gitar Plus, which named her the "Queen of Funk rock". The single "Are You The One" was the second-most added song on the Billboard Adult Contemporary chart in the week of its release.

== Track listing ==
1. "K-yotic" feat. Bootsy Collins - 3:39
2. "Hustler's Blues" – 3:26
3. "Foxey Lady" – 4:08
4. "A Little Rough" – 3:44
5. "Are You The One" – 3:33
6. "Run Free" – 2:58
