= Stealing Time =

2001 film

- Directed by: Marc Fusco
- Written by: Marc Fusco; Michael Garrity
- Produced by: Mike Gabrawy; Michael Garrity; Anthony Romano; Michel Shane
- Starring: Peter Facinelli; Jennifer Garner; Charlotte Ayanna; Ethan Embry; Scott Foley; Jeff Anderson
- Distributed by: Nickel Palace
- Release date: June 15, 2001
- Running time: 103 minutes
- Country: United States

Stealing Time, originally titled Rennie's Landing, is a 2001 coming-of-age drama film involving the reuniting of four college friends, each of them now dealing with their own problems. They ultimately come up with a solution: rob a bank.

The film had its national premiere on June 17, 2001 at the Seattle International Film Festival.

== Plot ==
The movie starts off with a voice over by Alec of events later in the movie, asking "Why do we make the decisions we make?" It then cuts to a year before, when the main characters are still at college in Eugene, Oregon. Alec's in the Administration and Records Office at his college where he argues with a clerk about a credit that is apparently missing from his transcript. Despite the fact that he is clearly one credit short of graduating, after four hours Alec convinces the college that he indeed has the credit and is set to graduate. The four of them have to move out of their apartment and proceed to work book buy back day, an event at college that lets students buy and sell used textbooks. The movie shows them repeatedly stealing some of the books and then selling them back to the book buyer in a smooth and elegant manner, as though they have done this many times. They also visit their favorite bar, Rennie's Landing, one last time. Casey asks Sam at one point why nothing has ever happened between the two of them, but she brushes him off and just tells him "don't."

The movie then picks up a year after they have graduated from college. Alec, the main character, is working as the secretary for a producer who he hates. Sam is in a dead end relationship and working at a Mexican restaurant in Salt Lake City, Utah. Casey is working as a coach for a girls' soccer team. Trevor is trying to become an actor, and working as stage crew for movies.

Sam tells her boyfriend that she got the social service job she always wanted, but her boyfriend isn't quite as thrilled. He has also spent most of their money without her knowing. Consequently, Casey was coming to visit as this happens and he and Sam leave to visit Alec and Trevor, who are now roommates. During the visit, Alec is diagnosed with a brain tumor, a fact that he conceals from his friends. Casey reconnects with a woman he used to date and who had had his baby without his support. Upon learning that the child died before his fifth birthday, Casey visits the child's grave and says that he's more responsible than he used to be, and he's ready to be a father now.

The four friends visit a convenience store, which Alec attempts to rob on a whim. This alarms his friends, who demand some kind of explanation, which he fails to provide. He then takes a long walk and decides that they all must take control of their lives. His solution to their problems is obvious in his mind; he wants them to rob a bank. At first his friends are skeptical, but they're all gradually shown how meticulous Alec has been about details; he had the whole thing planned down to the minute, but stresses that any slip up will cost them time and potentially cause them to fail the mission. Slowly they all join the plan and go to rob the bank to help cope with the new problems in their lives. Sam wants to run away with Casey, who wants to help an immigrant woman and her daughter stay in the country, Trevor wants to go to Fiji, and Alec's plans aren't really clear.

The gang then don their disguises and proceed to rob the bank. The robbery is successful in that they find a larger amount than expected, $5 million. They steal the cash and successfully get out of the bank, splitting up according to their plan, except Alec inadvertently knocks over a jar of pennies that he brought into the bank with him as a distraction for the bank manager and security guard. The jar shatters and its contents spill out all over the floor. Realizing he does not have time to recover the jar's contents, Alec leaves it behind. Casey and Sam meet up at a restaurant called The Outlaws, the agreed-upon meeting point. They are joined by Trevor, and the three wait nervously for Alec, who is late. A television news broadcast in the bar states that the police have recovered a very good lead. Stuffed among the jar of pennies that Alec unintentionally left behind at the bank was a Rennie's Landing badge that Trevor was playing with innocently earlier in the film. The badge has Trevor's full name on it. Using this lead, the police issue a broadcast alert for Trevor, who had just used his credit card at the restaurant to pay for their drinks. The bartender calls the police, who surround the bar. Casey is stopped leaving the bar. Sam goes to the ladies' room. Trevor comes outside to join Casey and sees that he is surrounded. He reaches into his back pocket for his keys, but the police (thinking he is reaching for a gun) fire on Trevor and Casey, instantly killing Trevor and mortally wounding Casey. Sam, hearing the commotion, exits the ladies' room using a back window. As she inches around the bar, she sees Trevor dead and Casey lying on the ground. He looks up at her and realizes she can still escape. When the police ask a dying Casey if anyone else is still inside, he says no, then dies.

Watching all of this from a distance is Alec, who was running late but showed up at the meeting point to join his friends. As he watches Trevor and Casey lying dead or dying, all of a sudden Alec falls to the ground. From that point, the viewers see a montage of the events in the movie, some of which were previously shown out of order. The viewers ultimately realize that everything that transpired after the first 20 or 30 minutes of the film (including the liquor store robbery and the bank robbery) were just hallucinations in Alec's head. In fact, he collapsed from his brain tumor at the bank that he robbed in his fantasies. We see Alec die and then hear his voiceover narration wishing his friends well and saying he hopes they live rich lives and can see each other again someday.

== Cast ==
- Peter Facinelli as Alec Nichols
- Jennifer Garner as Kiley Bradshaw
- Charlotte Ayanna as Samantha 'Sam' Parkes
- Ethan Embry as Trevor Logan
- Scott Foley as Casey Shepard
- Jeff Anderson as Convenience Store Clerk
