= Rude Dog and the Dweebs =

- Based on: Rude Dog by Brad McMahon
- Written by: Kayte Kuch; Hank Saroyan; Sheryl Scarborough
- Voices of: Rob Paulsen; Dave Coulier; Peter Cullen; Jim Cummings; Ellen Gerstell; Hank Saroyan; Mendi Segal; Frank Welker
- Theme music composer: Hank Saroyan
- Country of origin: United States
- Original language: English
- No. of series: 1
- No. of episodes: 13 (26 segments)

Production
- Executive producers: Margaret Loesch; Joe Taritero
- Producer: Hank Saroyan
- Running time: 23 minutes (2 11-minute segments)
- Production company: Marvel Productions

Original release
- Network: CBS
- Release: September 16 – December 16, 1989

Rude Dog and the Dweebs is a 1989 American Saturday-morning cartoon television series developed by Sun Sportswear, based on the Rude Dog character created by Brad McMahon featured in clothes advertising. The series was produced by Marvel Productions and animated by AKOM.

== Plot ==
The series takes place in Beverly Hills. Rude Dog (voiced by Rob Paulsen in a conventional New Jersey accent) runs a package delivery service and lives in a garage with a group of seven other dogs called the Dweebs. The team includes the stuttering Dachshund Caboose (voiced by Frank Welker), the uptight Bulldog Winston (voiced by Peter Cullen in an English accent), the Smooth Fox Terrier Reginald a.k.a. Reggie (voiced by Mendi Segal impersonating Jack Nicholson), the Great Dane Barney (voiced by Dave Coulier in a Southern accent), the Chinese Crested mix Ditzy Kibble (voiced by Ellen Gerstell), the Beagle Satch (voiced by Jim Cummings impersonating Ed Wynn), and the friendly Chihuahua Tweek (voiced by Hank Saroyan). Rude Dog has a girlfriend named Gloria (voiced by Ellen Gerstell).

The dogs have an enemy in the vicious cat Seymour (also voiced by Frank Welker), as well as the ubiquitous dog catcher Herman (also voiced by Peter Cullen) and his dimwitted Rottweiler assistant Rot (also voiced by Frank Welker). Each week, Rude Dog and company balance their delivery duties with attempts to elude the persistent Seymour, Herman, and Rot.

== Distribution ==
The show aired in the United States on CBS from September 16 to December 16, 1989 for one season. It was also broadcast around the world on various channels such as the BBC, The Children's Channel, Sky One, Gold and Nickelodeon in the United Kingdom, Network Ten and Fox Kids in Australia, M-Net, SABC 1 and SABC 2 in South Africa, Club Super3 in Spain, ZNBC in Zambia, TV1 and TV3 in Malaysia, Dubai 33 in the United Arab Emirates, Mediacorp Channel 5 and Prime 12 in Singapore, TVB Pearl in Hong Kong, GMA Network in the Philippines, Magic Kids in Argentina, TV3 in Sweden, StarPlus in India, TVRI in Indonesia, TV2 in New Zealand and ZBC TV in Zimbabwe.

== Ownership ==
Ownership of the series passed to Disney in 2001 when Disney acquired Fox Kids Worldwide, which also includes Marvel Productions. The series is not available on Disney+.

== Episodes ==
No.	Title	Original release date
1	"Hello, Mr. Kitty? / The Fish Who Went Moo"	September 16, 1989
Rude Dog takes the Dweebs to the zoo so they can learn the dynamic between cats and dogs. The Dweebs are interested in having a pet, specifically a fish. Barney accidentally brings home a cow that says "maa" instead of "moo", prompting the dogs to go find its owner.
2	"Dweebiest Dog on the Beach / Dweeb-Illac Dilemma"	September 23, 1989
While having a fun day at the beach, the Dweebs see a flyer for a talent show and decide to participate. The talent show, however, ends up being a scheme by Herman and Rot to take the dogs to the pound. Rude Dog and Tweek go and get pizza, but the pizza accidentally ends up on the hubcap of the Pink Cadillac when the other Dweebs are trying to clean the car and Reggie loses the hubcap.
3	"No Dweebs Aloud / Ding-a-Ling Kitty"	September 30, 1989
Rude Dog takes the Dweebs to a museum so they won't be bored. Despite the "No Dweebs Allowed" sign, the dogs manage to get in using a disguise, which Herman and Rot take advantage of. Seymour develops amnesia and thinks he is a dog, so the Dweebs attempt to make Seymour adapt to their lifestyle.
4	"War of the Dweebs / Dweebs in Space"	October 7, 1989
The Dweebs are convinced that aliens are attacking after Winston accidentally changes the TV channel from the news to a disaster movie, and attempt to guard the house at all costs. Things get crazier when Rude Dog and Tweek come home wearing alien costumes that they bought for their Halloween trick-or-treating. Reggie tries to take Satch's place when he is recruited to go to outer space. Meanwhile, Seymour attempts to sabotage the trip.
5	"Nightmare on Dweeb Street / Dweebsy Kind'a Love"	October 14, 1989
Caboose starts having recurring nightmares about being chased by trains, so the others take him to a railroad depot to conquer his fear. Tweek is in love with another dog across the street, so the others attempt to teach Tweek some helpful tips about romance.
6	"Call of the Dweeb / Dumbbell Dweeb"	October 21, 1989
The dogs take Kibble on a camping trip so she can get some Pup Scout Merit Badges. Satch feels like he does not know anything after he fails to get all the answers right while watching a game show, so the others try to help him.
7	"Waiter, There's a Dweeb in My Soup! / Boardwalk Boss"	October 28, 1989
Rude Dog is invited to go on a date with Gloria at a fancy French restaurant, where the Dweebs try to set the mood by playing music and cooking food to hilarious results. The dogs go to the Boardwalk Carnival. Herman and Rot take advantage of this and visit the carnival for the sole purpose of capturing the Dweebs.
8	"To Kibble or Not to Kibble / Dweebsday Afternoon"	November 4, 1989
9	"Dweebochondriacs / Surprise, You're Itch!"	November 11, 1989
10	"Leave It to Tweek / Polly Wanna Dweeb?"	November 18, 1989
11	"Winston's Family TreeRot / Pretty Dweebs All in a Row"	November 25, 1989
Winston shows Rude Dog a poster of his family tree. Satch mistakes the poster for a "connect-the-dogs" game, thus causing Winston to believe he is related to Rot. Kibble decides to take up gardening with Rude Dog and Winston's assistance. Meanwhile, Tweek finds a bugle and keeps playing it badly, much to the other Dweebs' annoyance.
12	"The Hiccuping Bandit / Dweeb Your Manners"	December 2, 1989
Satch's hiccups get in the way of the Dweebs' neighborhood watch. Rude Dog encourages Winston to teach the Dweebs some manners.
13	"Tuesday the 14th, Part Dweeb / Home Sweet Dweeb"	December 16, 1989
Barney believes he is cursed with bad luck after experiencing several unfortunate events throughout the day. Herman tricks Barney, Tweek and Caboose into carrying a tracking device to lead him to the Dweebs.

== Home media ==
In 1990 and 1991, select episodes were released in the United States on 30-minute, 60-minute, and 120-minute NTSC VHS tapes and laserdiscs by Celebrity Home Entertainment's "Just for Kids Mini-Features" line. Beginning in 1990, select episodes were released in the United Kingdom on 70-minute, PAL VHS tapes by Leisureview Video and Boulevard Entertainment (MARVEL VIDEO COMICS), rated U for "Universal" and deemed suitable for all ages.

In the UK, the series was released on VHS by Leisureview Video in 1990.

U.K. VHS releases
VHS title	Release date	Episodes
Rude Dog and the Dweebs	April 30, 1990	Hello, Mr. Kitty? / The Fish Who Went Moo, Dweebiest Dog On The Beach / Dweeb-Illac Dilemma, No Dweebs Aloud / Ding-A-Ling Kitty

Rude Dog and the Dweebs was also released on DVD around 2005.

== Reception ==
The series received negative reviews. In 2014, listing it among twelve 1980s cartoons that did not deserve remembrance, io9 characterized the series as "an animated atrocity", noting that the series appeared to glorify the "rudeness" that was the main character's defining characteristic.
