= Bressack =

Bressack is a surname. Notable people with the surname include:

- Gordon Bressack (1951–2019), American television writer
- James Cullen Bressack (born c. 1992), American film producer, screenwriter, and film director, son of Gordon
