= Ellen Gerstell =

American voice actress (born 1954)

- Born: October 16, 1954 (age 71); United States
- Occupations: Voice actress Vocal coach
- Spouse: Gordon Bressack
- Children: 3, including James

Ellen Gerstell (born October 16, 1954) is an American voice actress. She is most known for providing the voice of Rapture in Jem and Mihoshi Kuramitsu in the Tenchi Muyo! franchise. She is the wife of the late Emmy Award-winning writer Gordon Bressack and mother of film producer James Cullen Bressack.

== Early life and education ==
She was a contestant on the $100,000 Pyramid in January 1986, where she won $49,950 in cash and other prizes while making it to the $100,000 tournament with one of the three fastest winner circle times of that season.

== Voice roles ==
- Aaahh!!! Real Monsters - Twarp
- Blondie and Dagwood - Cookie Bumstead
- Captain Simian & the Space Monkeys - Dr. Kelb
- Darkwing Duck - Ample Grime
- Dragon's Lair - Princess Daphne
- Jem - Rapture/Phoebe Ashe, Astral
- Little Clowns of Happytown - Tickles
- Little Nemo: Adventures in Slumberland - Page
- Magical Girl Pretty Sammy - Mihoshi Mizutani, Yuka, Chihiro Kawai (ep. 1)
- Mighty Max - Flight Attendant, Sarah
- Monchhichis - Tootoo
- My Little Pony 'n Friends - Locket, Lofty, Scoops
- My Little Pony: The Movie - Magic Star
- Poochie - Poochie
- Rude Dog & the Dweebs - Ditzy Kibble, Gloria; Additional Voices
- TaleSpin - Katie Dodd
- Tenchi Muyo! - Mihoshi Kuramitsu (OVAs 1-2), (Tenchi Universe), (Tenchi Muyo! Mihoshi Special), (Tenchi Muyo in Love), (Magical Girl Pretty Sammy (OVA 1))
