= Hate crime (disambiguation) =

A hate crime is a crime motivated by prejudice.

Hate crime may also refer to:

- Hate Crime (2005 film), a drama film
- Hate Crime (2013 film), a horror film
