= Sam Asghari =

American model and fitness trainer (born 1994)

- حسام اصغری
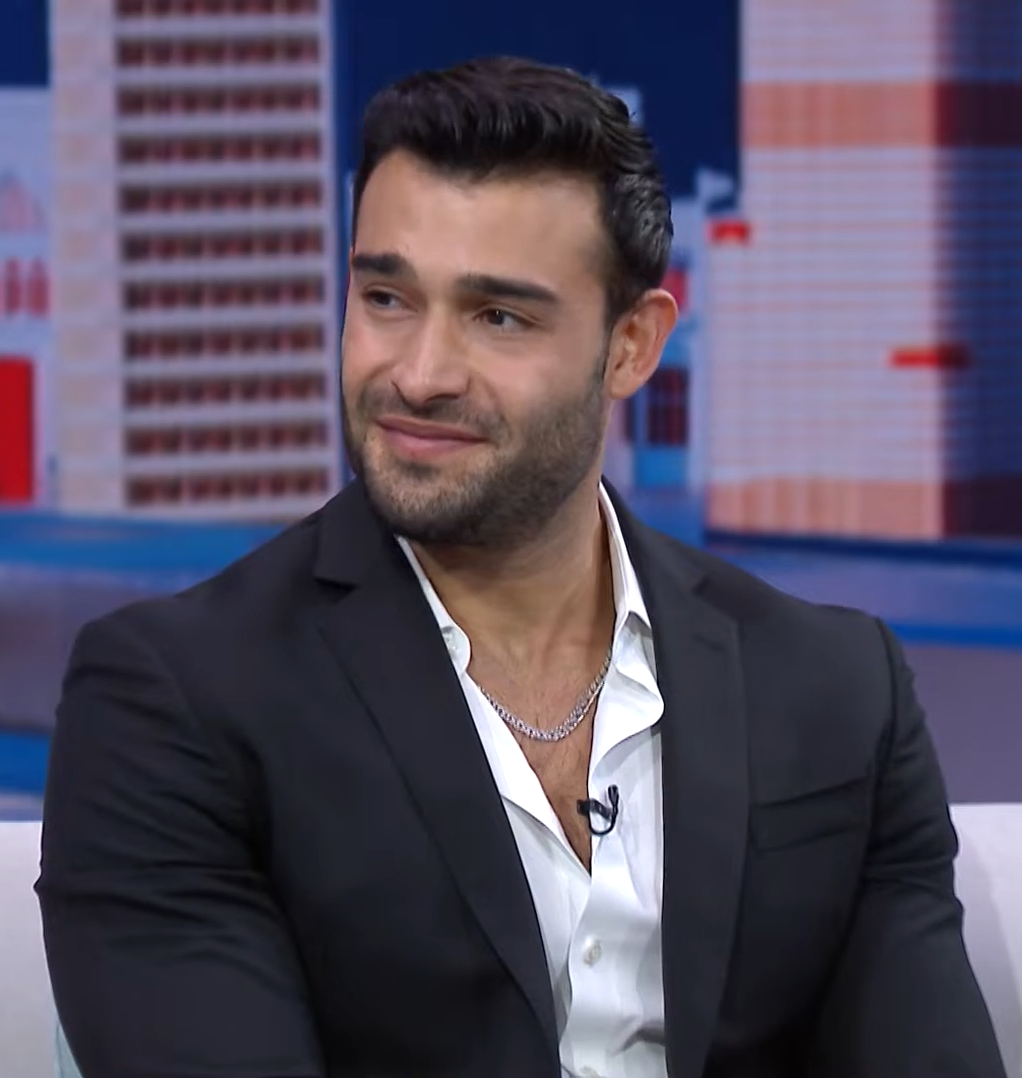
- Asghari in 2024
- Born: Hesam Asghari; March 3, 1994 (age 32); Tehran, Iran
- Other names: Sam Asghari; Persian: سام اصغری
- Citizenship: United States
- Education: Moorpark College
- Occupations: Model; actor; fitness trainer
- Years active: 2009–present
- Height: 6 ft 2 in (1.88 m)
- Spouse: Britney Spears (m. 2022; div. 2024)

Hesam Asghari (Persian: حسام اصغری, known as Sam Asghari (سام اصغری); born March 3, 1994) is an Iranian-American model and actor. He has appeared on the television shows Black Monday, Hacks, The Family Business, and The Traitors, as well as in several music videos. He was married to singer Britney Spears from 2022 to 2024.

== Early life and education ==
Hesam Asghari was born on March 3, 1994, in Tehran, Iran. The youngest of four children, he has three sisters. He started gymnastics at four years old, moving to the United States nine years later at age 13 when he knew no English. He learned the language mainly by watching American films and television series.

Asghari shortened his given name Hesam to Sam as it was considered easier to pronounce. In high school, he took theater classes, acting in the plays Hamlet and Macbeth, and played football. After high school, he attended Los Angeles Pierce College, in Woodland Hills, California. He eventually dropped out but continued to work his job at Best Buy.

== Career ==
At age 21, Asghari was introduced to modeling by his sister Fay. His first runway show was in Palm Springs, California for designer Michael Costello. Asghari has modeled for multiple magazines, including having spreads in Vulkan, Men's Health, Iron Man, GQ, and others. In 2019, he received a Daytime Beauty Award at the 2nd annual Daytime Beauty Awards for Outstanding Achievement in Fitness.

In 2018, Asghari appeared in his film debut in the parody Star Trek spoof Unbelievable!!!!! headed by Snoop Dogg. Asghari's role was a cameo. In 2021, he appeared in Black Monday season 3 for a multi-episode arc, in which he played Giancarlo, "a super sexy model who works for Pfaffashions." Later the same year, he appeared on the television show Hacks for an episode as a "sexy Santa"; he stated, "Working with Jean Smart — I'm flattered to work with such amazing talents that have been around the craft for such a long time. She was so professional. We had a great time." Producer Lucia Aniello praised Asghari for the role, stating, "He was really funny. He improvised a ton. He looked like Sexy Santa. He just checked all the boxes and he was really so sweet and funny. We just loved him." Also in 2021, he auditioned for the part of Carrie Bradshaw's physical therapist Travis on the And Just Like That... episode "Tragically Hip", but was not selected for the role.

In October 2021, Asghari joined the action thriller film Hot Seat as a co-star alongside Mel Gibson and Kevin Dillon. People noted it would be Asghari's first major film role. Director James Cullen Bressack told TooFab Asghari is "one of the nicest people, he's such a kind human being and he's a very talented actor. I think people are gonna like his role in this. He knows how to do some really cool action shots and I think he shows it off in the movie so it's pretty exciting." Asghari portrayed SWAT Sergeant Tobias, a role for which he had been physically training.

Since 2020, Asghari has been the owner of Asghari Fitness, a website that offers personalized training programs.

Asghari has said he has avoided roles that play into Middle Eastern stereotypes, such as terrorist characters. He declined appearances on two reality television shows: Celebrity Big Brother and the Masked Singer. However, Asghari was cast in the third season of The Traitors, which was released in early 2025.

== Personal life ==
Asghari became an American citizen in 2012. During the 2023 SAG-AFTRA strike, he picketed along with other union members. Asghari said, "We're here to raise awareness on my brothers and sisters working hard and striking for my future. And I hope everything gets resolved very fast so we can all go back to what we love doing the most, which is making art and inspiring people."

=== Relationships ===
Asghari formerly dated American actress and singer Mayra Verónica after appearing in the music video accompanying her song "No Boyfriend, No Problem".

Asghari first met Britney Spears in her 2016 music video for "Slumber Party" featuring Tinashe. The two got engaged in September 2021. Before marrying, Asghari and Spears signed a prenuptial agreement to protect Spears' fortune, estimated at $60 million as of June 2022.

On April 11, 2022, Spears announced that she was pregnant with her third child and Asghari's first, but she suffered a miscarriage a month later. Asghari and Spears married June 9, 2022, at Spears' California home. After the wedding, they moved to a new $11.8 million mansion in Calabasas, which Spears purchased. In July 2023, Asghari and Spears separated, and Asghari filed for divorce in August, due to irreconcilable differences. On May 1, 2024, Spears and Asghari reached a divorce settlement. The following day, the judge signed off on the settlement, and the couple were divorced on December 2, 2024 (Spears' 43rd birthday).

== Filmography ==
Film
Year	Title	Role	Notes
2018	Unbelievable!!!!!	Himself	Cameo
2019	Can You Keep a Secret?	Omar	
2022	Hot Seat	Sergeant Tobias	
2024	Jackpot!	Senior Agent Ash	
2026	The Gentleman Thief	Victor	

Television
Year	Title	Role	Notes
2019	NCIS	Security Guard Russell	Episode: "The North Pole"
2020	The Family Business	Armeen	Episode: "Heat It Up!"
2021	Hacks	Sexy Santa	Episode: "There is no Line"
2021	Black Monday	Giancarlo	3 episodes
2021	When We Grow Up	Eli	
2022	PBC	Christian	3 episodes
2022	Dollface	Tyler	Episode: "Right Hand Woman"
2023	Special Ops: Lioness	Kamal	Episodes: "Bruise Like a Fist" and "The Choice of Failure"
2025	The Traitors 3	Contestant	Murdered; 9th place

Music videos
Year	Song	Artist
2014	"No Boyfriend, No Problem"	Mayra Verónica with Sak Noel, DJ Kuba & Neitan
2016	"Work from Home"	Fifth Harmony feat. Ty Dolla Sign
2016	"Slumber Party"	Britney Spears feat. Tinashe
