= Hot seat =

Hot seat or hotseat may refer to:

== Television ==
- Hot Seat (game show), American show on ABC
- Hot Seat (talk show), political talk show hosted by Wally George
- Hot Seat, a pricing game on the game show The Price Is Right
- Hot seat, the term used for the contestant's chair on the game show Who Wants to Be a Millionaire?
- Millionaire Hot Seat, the 2009 relaunch of the Australian version of Who Wants to Be a Millionaire?

== Others ==
- A slang term for the electric chair
- Hot Seat (film), 2022 action thriller
- Hot Seat (G.I. Joe), a fictional character in the G.I. Joe universe
- Hotseat (multiplayer mode), in computer games when players take consecutive turns in a single "seat"
