= Ghosthunters (film) =

- Directed by: Pearry Reginald Teo
- Written by: Pearry Reginald Teo
- Produced by: David Michael Latt
- Starring: Francesca Santoro; Stephen Manley; David O'Donnell
- Cinematography: Spencer Hutchins
- Edited by: Christopher Roth
- Music by: Scott Glasgow
- Production company: The Asylum
- Distributed by: The Asylum
- Release date: July 5, 2016
- Running time: 90 minutes
- Country: United States
- Language: English

Ghosthunters is a 2016 American direct-to-video horror film written and directed by Pearry Reginald Teo. The film stars Francesca Santoro, Stephen Manley and David O'Donnell. The film was released by The Asylum on July 5, 2016. In the tradition of The Asylum's catalog, Ghosthunters is a mockbuster of the 2016 film reboot Ghostbusters.

== Plot ==
A group of paranormal investigators, Neal, Henry, Jessica, Neal's girlfriend Amy, and Jessica's girlfriend Devon, have arrived at a house where Henry's wife and daughter were murdered by a serial killer known only as the Night Stalker. The team hopes to free the pair's souls via a device created by Neal, which can capture ghosts and seal them in containers. As the investigation proceeds Devon leaves and is killed by a floating knife while another Amy experiences a series of visions. These visions not only show her the deaths of Henry's wife and daughter, but also reveal that Henry is the Night Stalker. Henry had murdered them as part of a paranormal experiment, in the hopes that their extreme distress would amplify paranormal energy. Amy manages to get a recording of Henry confessing to the murders, an action that ends with Henry shooting Neal with a gun he was carrying with him. Amy and Jessica flee, but are caught by Henry. They are almost shot, but are spared when the ghost of Henry's wife appears and distracts him long enough for Jessica to break the containers of ectoplasm. The now released ghosts attack Henry, killing him and giving Amy and Jessica a chance to escape - only for Jessica to get shot and die. The film ends with Amy, the sole survivor of the night's events, leaving the house as police arrive.

== Cast ==
- Francesca Santoro as Amy
- Stephen Manley as Henry
- David O'Donnell as Neal
- Liz Fenning as Jessica
- Web Crystal as Devon
- Phyllis Spielman as Martha
- Anna Harr as Gabby
- Kim Shannon as Sally
- Aaron Moses as Stanley
- Kris Marconi as Officer Mack

== Release ==
The films was released direct-to-video on July 5, 2016 in the United States.

== Reception ==
HorrorNews.net reviewed the movie, criticizing it for a lack of logic and sense while stating that "In the end, though, horror fans tend to prioritize tension and dread over lucidity, and if you are willing to make that tradeoff, Ghosthunters can be oddly satisfying."
