= Eminence Hill =

2019 film

- Directed by: Robert Conway
- Written by: Robert Conway
- Produced by: Mem Ferda; Robert Conway; Richard Southard
- Starring: Barry Corbin; Dominique Swain; Lance Henriksen; Clint James; Owen Conway; Dustin James Leighton; Anna Harr
- Cinematography: Barry Cohen
- Edited by: Robert Conway
- Music by: Jay Martin
- Release dates: October 5, 2019 (The Wild Bunch Film Festival); November 1, 2019 (United States)
- Running time: 100 minutes
- Country: United States
- Language: English

Eminence Hill is an American Western film written and directed by Robert Conway. It stars Barry Corbin, Dominique Swain, Lance Henriksen, Clint James, Owen Conway, Dustin James Leighton and Anna Harr.

== Plot ==
In search of revenge against the twelve jurors who sentenced his brother to death, Royce Tullis (Clint James) left a trail of bloody revenge against them.

== Cast ==
- Barry Corbin as Noah
- Dominique Swain as Gretchen James
- Lance Henriksen as Mason Mills
- Clint James as Royce Tullis
- Louie Iaccarino as Cyrus Pope
- Cameron Kotecki as Samson Sullivan
- Owen Conway as Quincy Hollis Foster
- Charlie Motley as Carson Garret
- Anna Harr as Ruth Ackerman
- Brinke Stevens as Wilhelmina
- Dustin James Leighton as Dathan
