= Survive the Game =

2021 action film by James Cullen Bressack

- Film poster
- Directed by: James Cullen Bressack
- Written by: Ross Peacock
- Produced by: Randall Emmett; George Furla; Shaun Sanghani; Alex Eckert; Tyler Jon Olson; Luillo Ruiz; Mark Stewart; Chad A. Verdi
- Starring: Chad Michael Murray; Bruce Willis
- Cinematography: Bryan Koss
- Edited by: R. J. Cooper
- Music by: Tim Jones
- Production companies: Grindstone Entertainment Group; EFO; The Pimienta Film Co.
- Distributed by: Lionsgate
- Release date: October 8, 2021 (United States)
- Running time: 97 minutes
- Country: United States
- Language: English
- Box office: $59,347

Survive the Game (also known as Killing Field) is a 2021 American action thriller film directed by James Cullen Bressack, and starring Bruce Willis and Chad Michael Murray.

It was released in the United States on October 8, 2021 by Lionsgate.

== Plot ==
When David, a cop, gets injured during a drug bust gone wrong, his partner, Cal, pursues the two culprits to a remote farm owned by Eric, a troubled veteran. As Cal and Eric plan their defense, more of the gang arrives—along with a wounded David. Outnumbered, the three men must now use stealth, smarts and marksmanship to take down the drug-dealing mob.

== Cast ==
- Bruce Willis as Det. David Watson
- Chad Michael Murray as Eric
- Swen Temmel as Cal
- Michael Sirow as Frank
- Kate Katzman as Violet
- Zack Ward as Mickey Jean
- Donna D'Errico as Carly
- Canyon Prince as Andrew
- Sarah Roemer as Hannah
- Sean Kanan as Ed

== Release ==
The film was released in select theaters and on VOD on October 8, 2021 and on Blu-ray and DVD on October 12, 2021.

=== Box office ===
As of August 27, 2022, Survive the Game grossed $59,347 in the United Arab Emirates.

== Reception ==
On the review aggregator website Rotten Tomatoes, 14% of 7 critics' reviews are positive, with an average rating of 3.5/10.

Bobby LePire of Film Threat rated the film an 8 out of 10 and wrote "Survive The Game may tell an oft-told story, but the script avoids most well-worn tropes in favor of a no-frills actioner."

=== Accolades ===
Bruce Willis was nominated for his performance in this movie, as he was for all movies he appeared in, in 2021, in the category Worst Performance by Bruce Willis in a 2021 Movie at the Golden Raspberry Awards. The category was later rescinded after he announced his retirement due to aphasia.
