= Bethany (film) =

- Film poster
- Directed by: James Cullen Bressack
- Written by: James Cullen Bressack; Zack Ward
- Produced by: James Cullen Bressack; Randy Charach; Shannen Doherty; Kenneth Gust; Shahen Jordan; Shant Jordan; Ace Underhill; Zack Ward
- Starring: Shannen Doherty; Tom Green; Stefanie Estes; Zack Ward
- Cinematography: John DeFazio
- Edited by: Bobby K. Richardson
- Music by: Alex Csillag
- Production companies: Brilliant Screen Studios; Grit Film Works; Koed Films
- Distributed by: Uncork'd Entertainment
- Release date: April 7, 2017
- Running time: 90 minutes
- Country: United States
- Language: English

Bethany is a 2017 American horror film directed and co-written by James Cullen Bressack and starring Shannen Doherty, Tom Green, Stefanie Estes and Zack Ward.

== Cast ==
- Stefanie Estes as Claire
- Zack Ward as Aaron
- Tom Green as Dr. Brown
- Shannen Doherty as Susan
- Anna Harr as Bethany / Young Claire
- Felissa Rose as Janice the Realtor
- Leon Russom as Doctor Merman
- Kevin Porter as Nurse Foster
- Keith Jardine as Harrison

== Reception ==
As of June 2020, the film holds a 29% approval rating on Rotten Tomatoes, based on seven reviews with an average rating of 5 out of 10.
