= Pearry Reginald Teo =

Singaporean filmmaker (1978–2023)

Pearry Teo
- Born: Pearry Reginald Teo Zhang Pingli; 23 July 1978; Singapore
- Died: 9 March 2023 (aged 44); Los Angeles, California, U.S.
- Other name: Pearry Reginald Teo
- Education: New York University Tisch School of the Arts; Institute of Metaphysical Humanistic Science
- Occupations: Film director, film producer and screenwriter
- Years active: 2002–2023
- Website: http://www.pearryteo.com/

Pearry Reginald Teo Zhang Pingli (23 July 1978 – 9 March 2023), commonly known as Pearry Teo, was a Singaporean filmmaker. He is considered the first Singaporean movie director to make a Hollywood film.

== Biography ==
Teo began his career as a school drop out, making quirky horror films, with borrowed cameras. His first film, Liberata Me, won the New York International Film Festival for best horror film. Shortly after, his following films won him awards leading to his first feature film deal The Gene Generation.

A fashion design drop out, Teo attended school in Melbourne, Australia before arriving to the United States to pursue his career in filmmaking (then he studied until he obtained a doctorate degree ). His fan base comprises mostly those in the underground sub-culture, whose keen interest in him lies in his unique but dark visual style. The movie, The Gene Generation, stars Bai Ling and Faye Dunaway. The movie was released on DVD on 27 January 2009.

In August 2009, Teo shot NBC / Universal (Syfy) first production in China called Witchville which starred Luke Goss, MyAnna Buring and Sarah Douglas. The film premiered on 22 May 2010 in the USA via Syfy Channel.

In 2013, Teo collaborated with author Christine Converse on Bedlam Stories, a fictional account of famous reporter Nellie Bly's stay in a mental institution in the 1920s. The novel combines the fictional worlds of Alice in Wonderland and Wizard of Oz in a horror genre.

Teo died at his North Hollywood home on 9 March 2023, at the age of 44.

== Filmography ==
Year	Title	Director	Writer	Producer	Ref.
2002	Liberata Me (aka Fade to Black)	Yes	Yes	Yes	
2003	Children of the Arcana	Yes	Yes	Yes	
2004	Take Me Somewhere Nice	Yes	Yes	Yes	
2007	The Gene Generation	Yes	No	No	
2009	Necromentia	Yes	Yes	No	
2010	Witchville	Yes	No	No	
2011	The Evil Inside	Yes	No	No	
2013	Dracula: The Dark Prince	Yes	No	No	
2015	Strange Blood	No	Yes	Yes	
2016	The Curse of Sleeping Beauty	Yes	Yes	Yes	
2016	Pale Horse	Yes	No	No	
2016	Ghosthunters	Yes	Yes	No	
2017	Stasis	No	No	Yes	
2018	The Ghost Beyond	No	Yes	No	
2019	The Assent	Yes	Yes	No	
2021	Fast Vengeance	Yes	Yes	No	
2022	Shadow Master	Yes	Yes	No	
2023	19 HZ	Yes	Yes	No	
