= Sean Kanan =

American actor (born 1966)

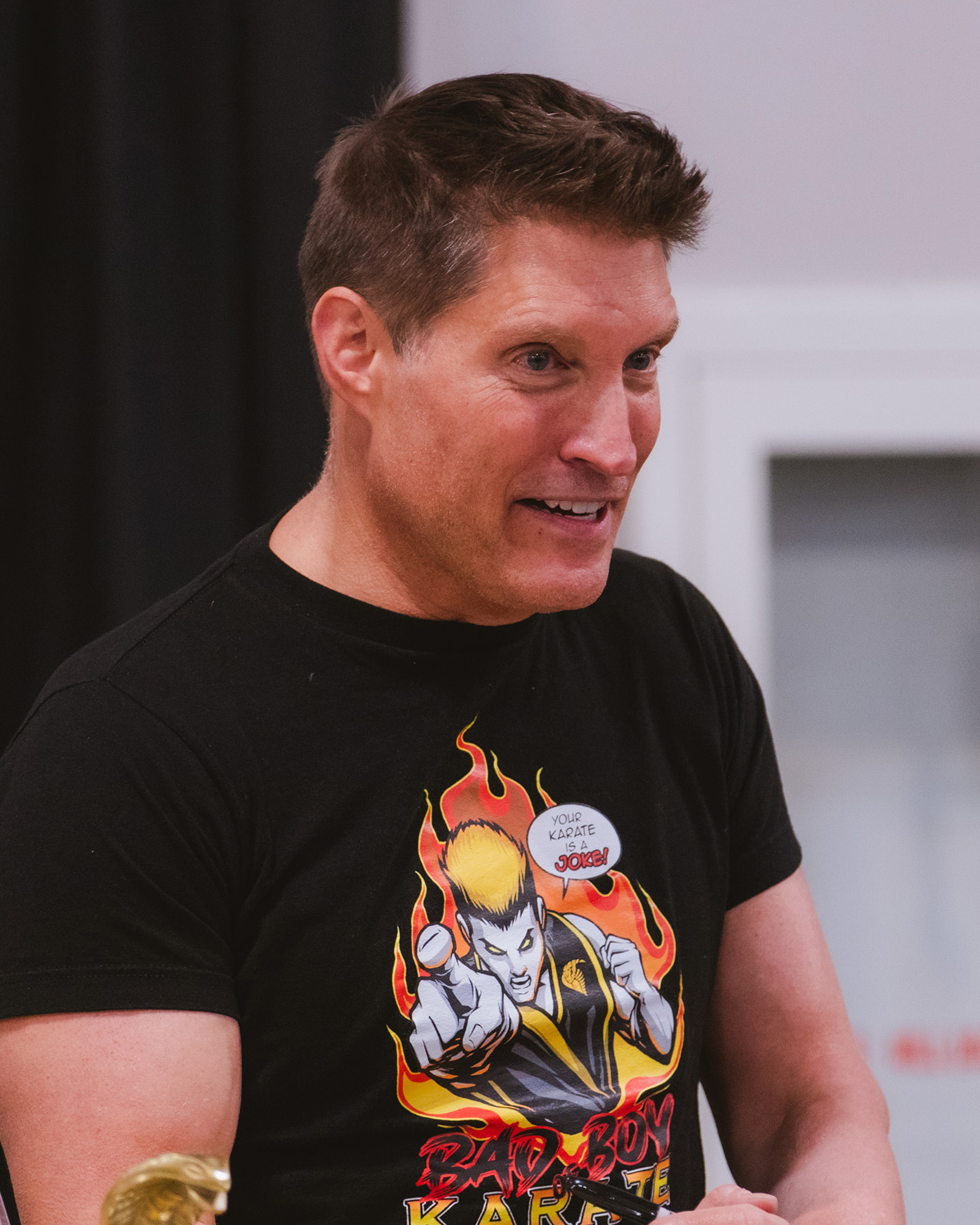
- Kanan in 2025
- Born: Sean Perelman; November 2, 1966 (age 60); Cleveland, Ohio, U.S.
- Education: Boston University; UCLA
- Occupations: Actor; producer; author
- Years active: 1988–present
- Known for: The Karate Kid Part III (1989); General Hospital (1993–1997, 2012–2014); The Bold and the Beautiful (2000–2005, 2012, 2014–2017, 2021–); The Young and the Restless (2009–2012, 2022); Studio City (2019–)
- Height: 180 cm (5 ft 11 in)
- Spouse: Michele Kanan (m. 2012)
- Children: 5
- Awards: Emmy Award

Sean Kanan (/keɪnən/; né Perelman; born November 2, 1966) is an American actor, producer, and author, best known for his portrayals of Mike Barnes (in The Karate Kid Part III and Cobra Kai), A. J. Quartermaine (on General Hospital), and Deacon Sharpe (on The Bold and the Beautiful and The Young and the Restless).

== Early life ==
Kanan was born Sean Perelman in Cleveland, Ohio, to Dale and Michelle Perelman. His family later relocated to New Castle, Pennsylvania. He was raised Jewish. Kanan attended Mercersburg Academy in Pennsylvania, Boston University and UCLA where he earned a degree in political science.

== Career ==
=== The Karate Kid Part III ===
Kanan's first notable role was that of villain Mike Barnes in the 1989 film The Karate Kid Part III directed by Academy Award winning Director, John Avildsen.

As a teenager, Kanan studied Shotokan karate under Sensei William Stoner. By the time he landed the role, Kanan had a good foundation of Japanese Karate which would be essential for portraying the central villain opposite of hero Daniel LaRusso played by Ralph Macchio. He trained in Shitō-ryū at a school run by Karate master Fumio Demura and with stunt coordinator and Tang Soo Do master Pat E. Johnson.

During filming, he suffered internal bleeding after injuring his omentum, a membrane that connects the stomach with other organs, supplying them with blood along with physically protecting them. Kanan collapsed at a Las Vegas hotel four days after shooting the scene and underwent life-saving surgery.

=== Television and film ===
==== 1990–2000 ====
The following year, he starred on the Fox television series The Outsiders, Executive Produced by Francis Ford Coppola. In 1993, Kanan joined the ABC soap opera General Hospital as A. J. Quartermaine the troubled son of Dr. Alan and Dr. Monica Quartermaine. Kanan was nominated for an award in the Outstanding Newcomer category by Soap Opera Digest for his believable portrayal of the fictional character whose storylines often centered on an ongoing battle with alcoholism. He also appeared in an advertisement and campaign for the clothing company C&A in 1994, the main theme was the culture of North American Indians, the advertisement was called Indian Spirits. The video was shot in San Francisco. He left the series in 1997 and returned in 2012 for the 50th anniversary of the show. Kanan's last appearance was on April 23, 2014, after his on-screen television character was killed. In 1999, Kanan joined the cast of Aaron Spelling's NBC soap opera Sunset Beach as Jude Cavanaugh and remained with the show until its cancellation later that year.

==== 2000–present ====
In 2000 he joined the cast of the CBS soap opera The Bold and the Beautiful as Deacon Sharpe, playing a character that was originally conceived as a short-term villain, but would later prove to be the basis for a popular, on-going storyline for the show.He would remain with the show until 2005 when he opted for recurring status while his on-screen character served a prison sentence for obstructing justice. Kanan also starred in several feature films in tandem with his television career. He wrote and executive-produced Chasing Holden, which was distributed by Lionsgate, and starred Kanan along with DJ Qualls. In 2002 he hosted the Miss World Pageant in London, and in 2006 competed in the third season of Ballando con le Stelle, the Italian version of Dancing with the Stars.

On July 10, 2009, Kanan reprised his role as Deacon Sharpe on the CBS sister soap opera The Young and the Restless. While appearing on The Young and the Restless, he starred in the 2009 Indie film Abracadabra, which was directed by Julie Pacino (Al Pacino's daughter) and was screened at the Cannes Film Festival. In May 2010, Kanan starred in My Trip to the Dark Side, written and directed by Shane Stanley. He later starred in the 2011 sequel My Trip Back to the Dark Side. Upon leaving The Young and the Restless in January 2012, Kanan reprised his role as Deacon Sharpe on The Bold and the Beautiful, but as of February 2024, he was taken off of the CBS web site for the cast of characters for the show, noting that Deacon is his favorite of all the characters he has played due in part to the writing of Bradley Bell.

=== Studio City ===
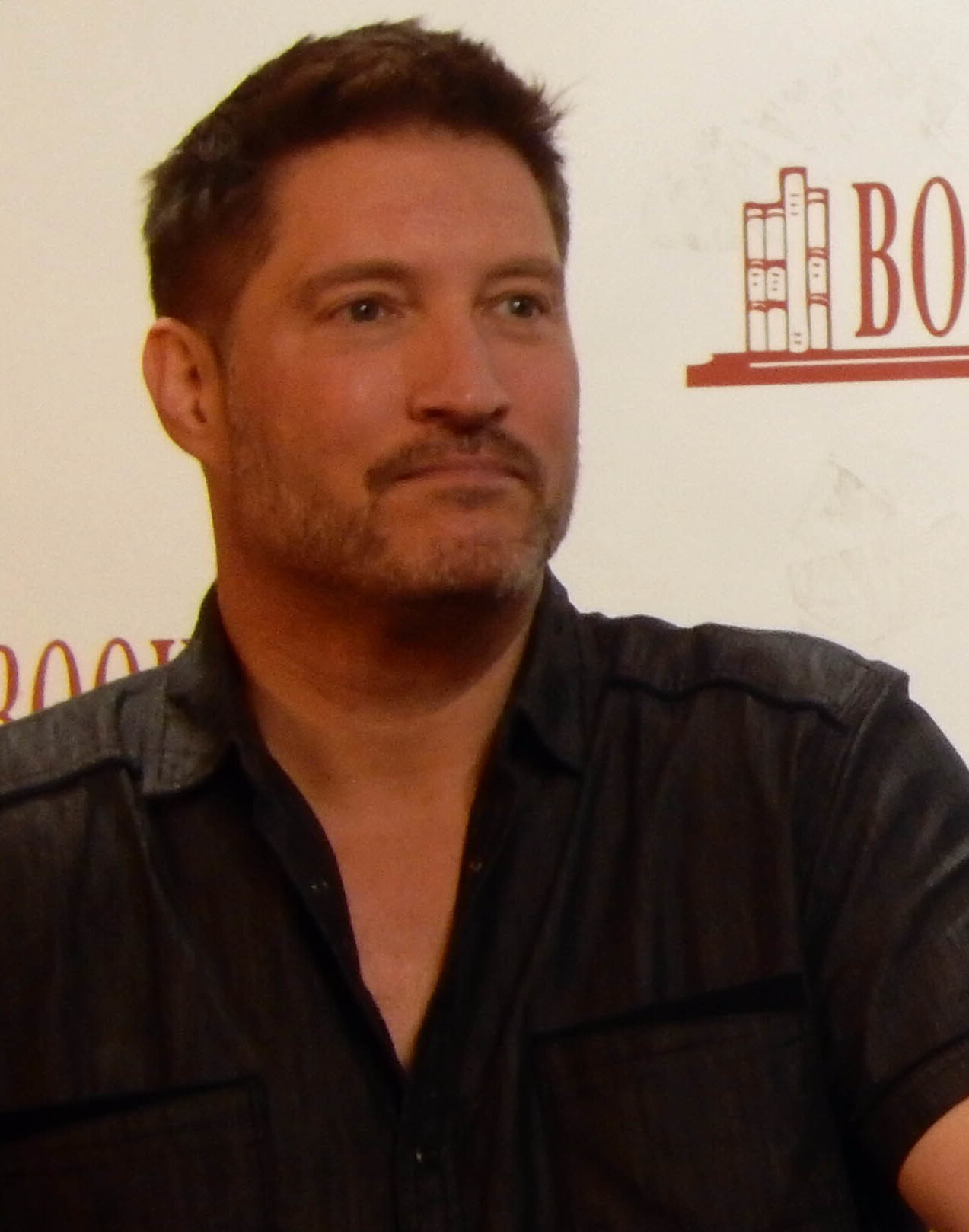
Kanan in 2019

In 2019 Kanan created the Emmy Award-winning digital drama series Studio City, directed by Timothy Woodward Jr., as a somewhat autobiographical love letter to the Daytime Soaps. Kanan stars as Sam Stevens, who portrays Dr. Pierce Hartley on the show-with-in-a show “Hearts on Fire”, along with Soap veterans Tristan Rogers, Carolyn Hennesy, Sarah Joy Brown, Patrika Darbo, and Scott Turner Schofield, the first openly transgender actor on Daytime TV. The episodes are penned by Kanan, along with Michele Kanan, Timothy Woodward Jr., and Lauren de Normandie (season one). The series explores issues like #meToo sexual harassment, ageism, gender identity and surprise paternity with enough levity to keep the story moving. Studio City was truly a family affair, with Kanan's Emmy-nominated wife Michele Kanan writing / producing and her daughter (Sean's step-daughter), Juliet Vega starring as Sam's surprise love child. STUDiO CiTY is streaming on Amazon Prime.

=== Cobra Kai ===
Kanan reprised his role as Mike Barnes from The Karate Kid III for the fifth season of Cobra Kai.

== Other ventures ==
=== Writing ===
In 2011, Kanan wrote The Modern Gentleman; Cooking and Entertaining with Sean Kanan, published by Dunham Books. He shared many of his favorite recipes, but also took the opportunity to help "rebrand men" by offering tips on etiquette, manners, and entertaining for special occasions. The goal of the book is to inspire people to be the best they can be, to get in touch with their authentic selves and to use cooking as a conduit for developing connections.

In 2019, the book Success Factor X, co-written by Kanan and motivational speaker Jill Liberman, was released. The book, published by Plain Sight Publishing, is described as a collection of strategies and secrets from a diverse group of high achievers ranging from billionaire entrepreneur Mark Cuban to hip-hop icons Run-DMC In 2021, Sean wrote Way of the COBRA in which he, as Sensei, inspires and instructs students on techniques to define their most authentic and successful self. The acronym COBRA stands for character, optimization, balance, respect, and abundance. He shares some of his own experiences from landing the breakout role of Mike Barnes in the Karate Kid III, to how he almost lost the role and his life in the process. In 2024, Kanan co-authored the third book in the WOTC series titled Way of the COBRA Couples, with his wife Michele Kanan.

=== Daytime Emmy and Walk of Fame ===
Kanan's career has been acknowledged through numerous industry awards including the Daytime Emmy for his series STUDiO CiTY. In 2016, Kanan received the 400th star on the Walk of Fame in Palm Springs.

== Personal life ==
Sean and Michele Kanan married in July 2012. He has a daughter by his prior relationship and Michele has four children of her own. Actor Steve Burton is his second cousin, by marriage.

Kanan is an active advocate for anti-bullying and an Ambassador for the organization Boo 2 Bullying. His charities include the American Cancer Society, Project Angel Food, and his tour with the USO entertaining troops in Bosnia.

== Filmography ==
=== Film ===
Year	Title	Role	Notes
1988	Hide and Go Shriek	John Robbins	Directed by Skip Schoolnik
1989	The Karate Kid Part III	Mike Barnes	Directed by John G. Avildsen
1991	Rich Girl	Jeffrey	
1994	Oasis Cafe	Actor	Also writer and executive producer
2000	The Chaos Factor	Jay	
2001	Crash Point Zero	Don Spengler	Directed by Jim Wynorski
2001	10 Attitudes	Craig	
2001	March	Julian March	Also executive producer
2003	Chasing Holden	Alex Patterson	Also writer and executive producer
2005	Carpool Guy	Tom	Directed by Corbin Bernsen
2006	Sons of Italy	Michele Morri	
2007	Hack!	Vincent King	Also executive producer
2008	Jack Rio	Adam McNeil	Also executive producer
2010	Changing Hands	Tom	Directed by Scott L. Schwartz
2010	My Trip to the Dark Side	David Prince	Directed by Shane Stanley
2014	My Trip Back to the Dark Side	David Prince	Directed by Shane Stanley
2014	A Place Called Hollywood	Gordon Plum	Directed by Gregori J. Martin
2017	Limelight	Sergio Veneto	
2019	Verotika	Sgt. Anders	Segment: "Change of Face"
2019	Beyond the Law	Delahunt	Directed by James Cullen Bressack
2021	Survive the Game	Ed	
2021	Fortress	Vlad	

=== Television ===
Year	Title	Role	Notes
1989	Baby Boom	Scott	Episode: "X-y-l-o-p-h-o-n-e"
1990	Who's the Boss?	Charlie	Episode: "Take Me Back to the Ballgame"
1990	The Outsiders	Gregg Parker	Recurring, 4 episodes
1991	Perry Mason: The Case of the Maligned Mobster	Jeff Sorrento	TV movie
1991	Revenge of the Nerds	Todd Channing	TV movie
1993	Perry Mason: The Case of the Killer Kiss	Mark Stratton	TV movie
1993	Wild Palms	Jacob	Episode: "Everything Must Go", Executive Producer Oliver Stone
1993	Step by Step	Michael	Episode: "Sister Act"
1993–97, 2012–14	General Hospital	A.J. Quartermaine	Main cast: February 16, 1993 – June 10, 1997; October 29, 2012 – April 29, 2014
1994	Dead at 21	Unknown	Episode: "Shock the Monkey"
1995	Lois & Clark: The New Adventures of Superman	Steve Law	Episode: "Super Mann"
1996	The Nanny	Mike McMullen	Episode: "The Cradle Robbers"
1998	Walker, Texas Ranger	Brad Alt	Episode: "Eyes of the Ranger"
1999	V.I.P.	Stu Solomon	Episode: "Three Days to a Kill"
1999	Sunset Beach	Jude Cavanaugh	Main cast: August 26 – December 31, 1999
2000–05, 2012, 2014–17, 2021–present	The Bold and the Beautiful	Deacon Sharpe	Main cast: November 1, 2000 – February 22, 2005; June 13, 2014 – June 16, 2017; October 7, 2021–present Recurring cast: May 24 – October 11, 2012
2001	Rendez-View	Unknown	Episode: "Surf's Up, Thumbs Down"
2006	Freddie	Steve Mulroy	Episode: "Eligible Bachelor"
2009–12, 2022	The Young and the Restless	Deacon Sharpe	Recurring cast: July 10, 2009 – January 30, 2012; Guest: September 20–21, 2022
2012	Happily Divorced	Keith	Episode: "Daddy's Girl"
2012	Desperate Housewives	Jason	Episode: "With So Little to Be Sure Of"
2014	Hell's Kitchen	Himself	Episode: "Winner Chosen"; Guest for Season 12's final Service
2019	Studio City	Sam Stevens and Dr. Pierce Hartley	Main role
2022	Killer Ambition	Earl	TV movie
2022–2024	Cobra Kai	Mike Barnes	Guest role (seasons 5–6)
2024–present	Bloodhound	Special Agent Chris Stone	Main role

== Awards and nominations ==
Year	Award	Category	Work	Result	Ref
1994	Soap Opera Digest Award	Outstanding Male Newcomer	General Hospital	Nominated	
1997	Online Film and Television Association Award	Best Supporting Actor in a Daytime Serial	General Hospital	Nominated	
2002	Daytime Emmy Award	America's Favorite Couple (shared with Katherine Kelly Lang)	The Bold and the Beautiful	Nominated	
2005	Soap Opera Digest Award	Outstanding Supporting Actor	The Bold and the Beautiful	Nominated	
2021	Independent Series Award	Outstanding Lead Actor	STUDiO CiTY	Won	
2021	Emmy Award	Outstanding Production Team	STUDiO CiTY	Won	

Preceded by Gerald Hopkins	A. J. Quartermaine (role); 1993–97; 2012–14	Succeeded by Billy Warlock
Preceded by Billy Warlock	A. J. Quartermaine (role); 1993–97; 2012–14	None
