= Strange Blood =

2015 film by Chad Michael Ward

- theatrical release poster
- Directed by: Chad Michael Ward
- Written by: Pearry Reginald Teo; Chad Michael Ward
- Produced by: Ehud Bleiberg; Nicholas Donnermeyer; John Eslinger; Allex Gregoire; Andreas Hohl; Pearry Reginald Teo; Oana Voicu; Rosie Zwaduk
- Starring: Robert Brettenaugh; Alexandra Bard; James Adam Lim
- Cinematography: Oscar Rivera
- Edited by: Damian Drago
- Music by: Holly Amber Church
- Production companies: Tiberius Film; Compound B Stone Studios; Teo Ward Productions
- Distributed by: Paramount Pictures; Tiberius Film; XLrator Media
- Release dates: January 30, 2015 (Turkey); April 2015 (US)
- Running time: 83 minutes
- Country: United States
- Language: English

Strange Blood is a 2015 science fiction horror film directed and written by Chad Michael Ward and starring Robert Brettenaugh and Alexandra Bard. It received its world premiere on 30 January 2015 in Turkey. Strange Blood was released on demand in April 2015 and DVD in June 2015.

== Plot ==
Dr. Henry Moorehouse (Robert Brettenaugh) is obsessively determined to find a universal cure for disease. He plans on doing this with an organism known only as 'Ella', a large parasite which he claims can successfully create a vaccine for any virus it's exposed to. Gemma (Alexandra Bard) is Henry’s assistant, who claims to have personally witnessed him going from being a genius doctor to an insane vampiric creature after an experiment gone awry.

== Cast ==
- Robert Brettenaugh as Henry Moorehouse
- Alexandra Bard as Gemma
- James Adam Lim as Det. Joseph Song
- Barbara Breidenbach as Sara
- Rosie Zwaduk as Waitress
- Scott Harders as Private Investigator
- Michelle Gabriela Lamarr as Goth Girl
- David Horn as Bouncer
- Thomas O'Halloran as Jacob Moorehouse
- Anna Harr as Ella Moorehouse
- Ian Whittaker as Fire Inspector
