= Beyond the Law (2019 film) =

2019 American crime action film

- Poster
- Directed by: James Cullen Bressack
- Story by: Johnny Martin Walters; Chad Law
- Produced by: Micah E. Brandt; James Cullen Bressack; Timothy Woodward Jr.
- Starring: Steven Seagal; Johnny Messner; DMX; Zack Ward; Bill Cobbs
- Cinematography: David Newbert; Alex Brendea
- Edited by: Stephen Kaiser-Pendergrast
- Music by: Charlie Wilkins
- Production company: Charach Productions
- Distributed by: Cinedigm (USA, theatrical)
- Release date: December 6, 2019
- Running time: 89 minutes
- Country: United States
- Language: English

Beyond the Law is a 2019 American crime action film directed by James Cullen Bressack. It stars Steven Seagal, Johnny Messner, DMX, and Bill Cobbs. The film follows a former detective who vows to avenge his estranged son's death and eventually takes on the local mob.

The film was released on VOD and limited theaters on December 6, 2019. The DVD was released on January 14, 2020. It also marks a reunion for Seagal and DMX who previously collaborated for Exit Wounds in 2001. Beyond the Law was the final film appearance of DMX before his death in April 2021.

== Plot ==
A young man named Chance Wilson falls into a life of corruption moving back into the intercity against the wishes of his father Frank Wilson. Frank Wilson initially hoped to keep his son safe and out of trouble by moving out into the country after the death of his wife. Believing life outside the big city is no life at all, Chance returns to the city where he becomes involved with gangsters led by Desmond Packard. While in the city, Chance develops a notorious reputation for gambling, oftentimes wagering more than he could afford to pay. One night after gambling at Packard's club, Chance's apartment is invaded by Packard and his men. Unable to produce the money he owes, Chance is brutally beaten and fatally shot by Packard.

Police Detective Ray Munce is called to the murder scene. Afterwards, he locates Frank Wilson's residence via Frank's closest friend and neighbor Mr. Swilley. The detective informs Frank of his son's murder and Frank embarks on a quest for justice for his son. He is visited in a diner by a colleague named Ashley Millet, formerly employed at the DA's office who offers her support. Meanwhile, news of Chance's murder quickly reaches the local mob. The boss Augustino "Finn" Adair is displeased to learn that Packard killed what is revealed as the "son of a cop". Making matters worse is that Frank Wilson is not simply a former cop living off-grid, but a man Boss Adair personally knows as being "one of the dirtiest cops" in the city, and a man whose life either must be bought or ended.

As Wilson returns to life in the city, he meets Charlotte who was Chance's girlfriend and an employee at one of the clubs Chance frequently visited. Despite her claim that Chance developed a bad reputation as a gambler with excessively high debt, Frank discovers Charlotte bought drugs using all of Chance's money that was owed to Packard. She confesses she wanted to leave the city with Chance but could not convince him. Frank blames her as the cause of his son's death and holds her accountable for the rest of her life. Frank also confronts Packard himself and vows justice for his son's death. It is later revealed that Munce is a dirty cop, working as an informant for Adair's mob. He reveals Frank's location in the country to Packard, who then sends out a hit squad. Frank dispatches most of the hit squad before being wounded. Munce visits the hospital Frank is recovering at and meets Frank's friends Swilley and Ashley.

Meanwhile, Boss Adair and Packard have a falling out after Adair condemns Packard's conduct and blames him for endangering their mob family for his wrongful murdering of Chance. Packard hatches a scheme to take over the mob family with his "father"'s second-in-command. The conspiracy is quickly discovered however and Adair executes his second-in-command as punishment. Meanwhile, Munce informs Packard of Frank's two closest friends and Packard sets out to silence Swilley. Packard confronts and kills Swiley at his home. Munce attempts to have Frank killed during his release from the hospital by other dirty cops. The ambush fails and Frank soon after meets and fatally shoots Munce after he admits his corruption. Frank proceeds to go to Packard's headquarters where he confronts and kills him, but not before being wounded by one of Packard's men. Soon after, Boss Adair is waiting for Frank who he now knows he must kill to protect his mob operation and legacy. The two fight, but Adair easily overpowers the wounded Frank and shoots him. Police respond to a 9-1-1 call on Frank's phone as the dying Frank smiles with content at the knowledge Adair will be imprisoned for life.

The film's final moments follow Charlotte who apparently went into hiding at a hotel. She reads a breaking news bulletin on her smartphone reporting Boss Adair's arrest and questioning for the murders of Frank Wilson and Detective Munce. Fearing any possible connections, Charlotte attempts to flee for her life but is intercepted by one of Adair's associates armed with a gun.

== Cast ==
- Steven Seagal as Augustino "Finn" Adair
- Johnny Messner as Frank Wilson
- DMX as Detective Ray Munce
- Bill Cobbs as Swilley
- Zack Ward as Desmond Packard
- Randy Charach as "Fitzy"
- Patrick Kilpatrick as Terrance
- Chester Rushing as Chance Wilson
- Saxon Sharbino as Charlotte Bayles
- Kim DeLonghi as Ashley Millet
- Jeff M Hill as Barrigan
- Sean Kanan as Delahunt
- Mike Ferguson as "Jynx"
- Yulia Klass as Karina
- Ken Garito as Ed
- Kansas Bowling as Chastity
