= Hot Seat (film) =

2022 American film by James Cullen Bressack

- South African theatrical release poster
- Directed by: James Cullen Bressack
- Written by: Collin Watts; Leon Langford
- Produced by: Randall Emmett; George Furla; Ceasar Richbow; Shaun Sanghani; Chad A. Verdi
- Starring: Kevin Dillon; Mel Gibson
- Cinematography: Bryan Koss
- Edited by: R.J. Cooper
- Music by: Timothy Stuart Jones
- Production company: 5 Star Films
- Distributed by: Lionsgate
- Release date: July 1, 2022
- Running time: 99 minutes
- Country: United States
- Language: English
- Box office: $68,798

Hot Seat is a 2022 American action-thriller film directed and produced by James Cullen Bressack. It stars Kevin Dillon and Mel Gibson.

== Premise ==
An anonymous criminal plants a bomb under the chair of an ex-hacker, and forces him to break into high-level banking institutions. The bomber forces Orlando to carry out a series of increasingly complex cyber-intrusions, threatening to detonate the device if he refuses or attempts to escape. As Orlando works to outsmart the attacker, a bomb-squad veteran, Wallace Reed, attempts to locate the anonymous criminal and defuse the situation from outside. Meanwhile, Orlando's family is drawn into the crisis as the attacker expands his targets, escalating the tension and raising questions about Orlando's past in the hacking world.

== Cast ==
- Kevin Dillon as Orlando Friar
- Mel Gibson as Wallace Reed
- Shannen Doherty as Chief Pam Connelly
- Michael Welch as Enzo
- Sam Asghari as Sgt. Tobias
- Eddie Steeples as Jackson
- Lydia Hull as Kim Friar
- Anna Harr as Zoey Friar
- Kate Katzman as Ava Adamson

== Production ==
Hot Seat is an action-thriller written by Collin Watts and Leon Langford. It is part of a long-term partnership between Grindstone Entertainment (a subsidiary of Lionsgate Films) and Emmett/Furla Oasis. The film was announced on October 15, 2021, as the third collaboration between actor Mel Gibson and producers Randall Emmett and George Furla. Filming took place in Las Cruces, New Mexico.

== Release ==
The film was released in select theaters, digital, and on demand on July 1, 2022.

== Reception ==
=== Critical response ===
On the review aggregator website Rotten Tomatoes, 17% of 18 critics' reviews are positive, with an average rating of 3.5/10.

=== Box office ===
Hot Seat, in its limited theatrical release, grossed $68,798 at the box office.
