= Skinwalker (2021 film) =

American Western thriller film

- Directed by: Robert Conway
- Written by: Robert Conway
- Produced by: Robert Conway; Norman S Davis; Phil Staley; Tommye Staley
- Starring: Eva Hamilton; Cameron Kotecki; Amelia Haberman; Dan Higgins
- Cinematography: Robert Conway
- Edited by: Owen Conway
- Music by: Guthrie Lowe
- Distributed by: Uncork’d Entertainment
- Release date: July 13, 2021
- Country: United States
- Language: English

Skinwalker is a 2021 American Western thriller film written and directed by Robert Conway. It stars Eva Hamilton, Cameron Kotecki and Amelia Haberman. The film was released on DVD and digital platforms on July 13, 2021.

== Plot ==
When two cowboys rob a Native American burial site, a hunter takes the famous Skinwalker, a shapeshifting monster, into an unheard-of world.

== Cast ==
- Eva Hamilton as Maisie
- Cameron Kotecki as Riggs
- Amelia Haberman as Nellie
- Dan Higgins as Bascom
- Daniel Link as Willard
- Charlie E Motley as Vern
