= Darkness of Man =

- Official DVD cover
- Directed by: James Cullen Bressack
- Written by: James Cullen Bressack; Alethea Hnatko-Cho
- Produced by: Jessica Bennett; James Cullen Bressack; Jarrett Furst; Andre Relis
- Starring: Jean-Claude Van Damme; Kristanna Loken; Emerson Min; Spencer Breslin; Sticky Fingaz; Shannen Doherty
- Cinematography: Pascal Combes-Knoke
- Edited by: R.J. Cooper
- Music by: Tim Jones; James T. Sale
- Production companies: JCB Pictures; Robotic Donut; Sandaled Kid Productions; VMI Worldwide
- Distributed by: Saban Films
- Release date: May 21, 2024 (VOD)
- Running time: 109 minutes
- Country: United States
- Language: English
- Budget: $5 million
- Box office: $17,324

Darkness of Man is a 2024 American action thriller film written, directed and co-produced by James Cullen Bressack. It stars Jean-Claude Van Damme, Kristanna Loken, Emerson Min, Spencer Breslin, Sticky Fingaz, and Shannen Doherty (in her final film released during her lifetime). The plot follows Interpol operative Russell Hatch (Van Damme) who witnesses the death of an informant when a seemingly routine raid goes wrong. Years later, he finds himself protecting the informant's son from a group of merciless gangs involved in an all-out turf war.

The film was released on VOD on May 21, 2024. It received generally positive reviews from critics.

== Plot ==
For two years Russell Hatch (Jean Claude Van Damme), an ex-Interpol agent has lived in darkness within punishing himself for what went wrong on that fateful night two years ago when an informant was killed. Hatch has been fulfilling a promise that he made that night to keep Jayden (Emerson Min) safe to lookout for him as a father would. Jayden lives with his Grandfather Mr Kim (Ji Yong Lee) who runs a shop in Korea town. Hatch is only a phone call away and is always there if they need him. Jayden`s Uncle Dae Hyun (Peter Jae)) is involved with the gangs of Korea Town, and plays on Jayden`s youth and him looking up to his lifestyle. Soon an on-going gang war comes to a head, now; Hatch has no choice but to call on the darkness inside. As the turf war gets out of control Hatch will go through anyone who gets in his way of protecting Jayden and his grandfather.

== Cast ==
- Jean-Claude Van Damme as Russell Hatch
- Kristanna Loken as Claire
- Emerson Min as Jayden
- Peter Jae as Dae Hyun
- Spencer Breslin as Chris
- Ji Yong Lee as Mr. Kim
- Sticky Fingaz as Yates
- Andrey Ivchenko as Lazar
- Shannen Doherty as Vivian
- Zack Ward as Alexei
- Chika Kanamoto as Esther
- Nick Diaz as Bo
- Weston Cage as Anton
- Kristos Andrews as Victor
- Shane Yoon as Min
- Sean Rhee as Joon
- Jay Kwon as Chul
- Lorenzo Antonucci as Markov
- Cynthia Rothrock as Nurse Leslie
- April Toledo as Cindy
- Kris Van Damme as Igor
- Galadriel Stineman as Dana
- B.J. Hendricks as Andy
- Nicolas Van Varenberg as Nikolai
- Danielle Vasinova as Sandra
- Marina Mazepa as Natalia
- SwagboyQ as Eric
- Eric Roberts as Larry
- Jackie Dallas as Ji-Soo
- David Josh Lawrence as Sasha
- Justin Bradley as Dennis
- Randall Bacon as Ed
- Andrea S. Loveless as Ethel
- Juliet Vega as Wendy
- Erik Walker Neill as Officer Stanislav
- Anna Harr as Bethany
- Sky Shim as Korean Gangster
- Mike Ferragamo as Russian Gangster
- Todd Senofonte as Russian Gangster
- Yavuz Topuz as Vlad
- Matt Staudt as Sergei
- Terrence Rotolo as Lazar's Driver
- James Cullen Bressack as Gordon
- Luke LaFontaine as Russian Cop
- Victoria De Mare as Makeup Room Girl

== Production ==
In November 2022, it was announced that an action film titled Darkness of Man was in development, with James Cullen Bressack directing, co-producing and co-writing the screenplay. Jean-Claude Van Damme was cast in the lead role as Russell Hatch. In March 2024, with the release of the official trailer, it was revealed that Kristanna Loken, Emerson Min, Spencer Breslin, Sticky Fingaz, and Shannen Doherty had joined the cast.

== Release ==
In February 2023, Saban Films acquired distribution rights to the film in the U.S., U.K., Australia, New Zealand, Africa, Spain, and Scandinavia.

Darkness of Man was released on VOD on May 21, 2024 with a DVD release following in June.

== Reception ==
On the review aggregator website Rotten Tomatoes, 63% of 8 critics' reviews are positive, with an average rating of 6.1/10.
