= Krampus: The Reckoning =

- Official release poster
- Directed by: Robert Conway
- Written by: Robert Conway
- Story by: Owen Conway; Robert Conway
- Produced by: Joseph Mbah; Owen Conway; Robert Conway; Justin L. Anderson
- Starring: Kevin Tye; James Ray; Monica Engesser; Amelia Haberman
- Cinematography: Travis Amery; Joseph Mbah
- Edited by: Robert Conway; Justin L. Anderson
- Music by: Kevin Tye; Owen Conway
- Production companies: Ugly Salamander; Alexander Designs; FunHouse Features
- Distributed by: Uncork'd Entertainment
- Release date: 3 November 2015 (United States)
- Running time: 89 minutes
- Country: United States
- Language: English

Krampus: The Reckoning (also known as The Hunted) is a 2015 American horror film written and directed by Robert Conway, and co-written by Owen Conway. Released direct-to-video, the film stars Monica Engesser as a child psychologist who is attempting to unravel the link between a mysterious young girl (Amelia Haberman) and the mythological creature known as Krampus (William Connor).

== Plot ==
One Christmas, a woman tells her granddaughter, Zoe Weaver, about Krampus. Zoe is placed in foster care after the death of her parents, and is eventually adopted by an abusive couple, who she kills using homemade, Voodoo doll-like effigies that can bring forth Krampus. While at a hospital, Zoe is interviewed by a child psychologist named Rachel Stewart, and uses her dolls to summon Krampus to murder a pedophilic orderly, as well as the negligent, alcoholic father of a fellow patient named Ashley.

Rachel looks into Zoe's past, and discovers that one of Zoe's previous foster fathers died under mysterious circumstances, and that Zoe, despite looking like a preadolescent, may in fact be over 30. Rachel, who has amnesia regarding her own childhood, begins having nightmares about Krampus, which eventually appears in her home alongside Zoe. Rachel flees with her adoptive son, Lamaar, but gets into a car accident, resulting in them both being hospitalized. A flashback reveals that Rachel is actually Zoe's older sister, and that she was a juvenile delinquent who, in an attempt to summon Krampus, set a fire that killed her parents and Zoe. In her dreams, Rachel is confronted by Zoe and Krampus, who she begs to save the dying Lamaar. Rachel spontaneously combusts in her hospital bed while Lamaar revives on the operating table, Krampus having taken Rachel's life in exchange for Lamaar's.

Zoe disappears, as does all evidence of her existence past her death year of 1992. Rachel's friend Miles visits her grave, and while leaving the cemetery, unknowingly walks past Zoe's tombstone.

== Cast ==
- Monica Engesser as Doctor Rachel Stewart
- Amelia Haberman as Zoe Eliza Weaver
- James Ray as Detective Miles O'Connor
- Kevin Tye as Doctor Tom Jennings
- Sean G.P. Anderson as Lamaar Coleman
- Owen Conway as Joseph Mooney
- Carrie Fee as Katherine A. Hoelzer
- Shawn Saavedra as Andrew Kelly
- Nathaniel Burns as Clayton Ellsworth
- Alexandria Stevens as Delores M. Kelly
- Benjamin Foronda as Theodore D. Hoelzer
- Angelina Mann as Ashley Ellsworth
- Jeffrey Lamaar as Detective James Cegan
- Gianna Frangella as Young Rachel Stewart
- Karen Rolston as Grandmother Weaver
- William Connor as Krampus/Brian the Bartender

== Reception ==
Luiz H.C. of Bloody Disgusting had a middling response to the film, writing, "Krampus: The Reckoning isn't an altogether-horrible movie. There is enough quality present to make up for much of the bad acting and effects, not to mention a low-budget charm that few filmmakers are capable of pulling off convincingly. The ending was also properly impactful, a rare feat for this kind of film. That being said, if you crave some spooky Christmas fun this year, Michael Dougherty's Krampus is probably a better choice, though there is room out there for more than one entertaining Krampus movie." A score of 1½ out of a possible 5 was awarded to the film by Matt Boiselle of Dread Central, who wrote, "As this complete lump of coal dragged on like a tranquilized reindeer in the snow, the detestable visuals were rivaled only by the incomprehensibly lackluster acting performances. I've seen local high school drama productions with more passion and delivery than this yule log. Sadly enough, if you're willing to sit through the majority of this fecal catastrophe, the final 20 minutes or so actually aren't that bad, but with the inclusion of some moronic backstories and wasteful plot pacing, this whole film closely resembles that crappy gift you've been given from your kooky aunt – just smile... and wait for her to leave before you toss it in the trash." Fellow Dread Central reviewer Ted Hentschke, who gave Krampus: The Reckoning a grade of 2/5, was more lenient towards the film, writing, "This film is a mess, but surprisingly it isn't the biggest mess. The shots are mostly passable, and I don't remember the audio cutting awkwardly more than once. It's a low bar, but this film is kinda watchable. I liked the cop character despite him starting every sentence with a manly growl. The monster is kind of stupid, but the biggest problem is that the plot is inconsequential. Not that things don't happen, but the conclusion and ultimate twist just has little to do with the rest of the movie."

The film was wholly condemned by Chris Coffel of Film School Rejects, who succinctly stated, "I'm pretty sure this is an allegory for child abuse with really bad digital effects and a creeper police detective. This film does score some bonus points for having a scene take place in Seamus McCaffrey's, an Irish pub in downtown Phoenix that I used to frequent. If you've never been to McCaffrey's, though, there is no bonus for you." John Noonan of Horror News had a similarly negative response to the film, writing, "At times, the film does look pretty slick for what is obviously a horror film on the low end of the budget spectrum. But when the Krampus reveals itself – not in that way, you dirty boy – it's hard not to break out into fits of giggles. Jerkily moving across the screen like an 8 bit end boss, Jurassic Shark is profoundly more effective than this. Coupled with some shoddy acting from all avenues and there's very little to keep Krampus: The Reckoning off the naughty list. As festive horror movies go, you'd do well to return to sender." UK Horror Scene's Elliott Maguire awarded the film a score of 5/10 and heavily criticized its computer-generated effects, but conceded, "The pace is fine, but it could have been even tighter, and in fairness, this is actually an interesting story. While it's easy to poke holes in, the plot takes some interesting turns towards the end that I actually didn't see coming, showing the filmmakers had more ambition than to just get confused with bigger budget films on the DVD shelves."

== See also ==
- List of Christmas films
- Krampus Unleashed, another Krampus film directed by Robert Conway
