= Krampus Unleashed =

2016 horror film

- Film poster
- Directed by: Robert Conway
- Written by: Robert Conway
- Produced by: Robert Conway
- Starring: Tim Sauer; Daniel Link; Bryson Holl; Taylor Buckley; Amelia Brantley; Caroline Lassetter; Emily Lynne Aiken
- Cinematography: Travis Amery
- Edited by: Owen Conway; Robert Conway
- Music by: John Rios
- Production companies: Triple G Production; FunHouse Features
- Distributed by: Uncork'd Entertainment
- Release date: 1 November 2016 (United States)
- Running time: 80 minutes
- Country: United States
- Language: English

Krampus Unleashed is a 2016 horror film written and directed by Robert Conway. Premiering on video on demand before being released direct-to-video, the film stars Bryson Holl, Caroline Lassetter, Tim Sauer, and Emily Lynne Aiken as members of a dysfunctional family who run afoul of the mythological creature Krampus (Travis Amery) while spending Christmas with relatives in the Southwestern United States.

== Plot ==
In 1898, German outlaw Erik Klaus disappeared, leaving behind ominous warnings to those looking for the treasure he buried in the Arizona desert. Years later, a group of cowboys discovers the loot: "summoning stone" that releases Krampus when exposed to open flames. According to myth, Saint Nicholas left pieces of the stone in the shoes and stockings of his enemies, so that Krampus would kill them when the clothing was placed by a fire to dry. When the stone is dropped on a lantern, Krampus is summoned and proceeds to massacre the cowboys. As Cooper, the sole survivor, flees, the stone falls into a stream, and is lost.

Decades later, Will and Amber, along with their children Tommy and Fiona, travels to Arizona to spend Christmas with Amber's parents, Dale and Alice Henderson. Also present are Amber's environmentalist brother, David, his wife, Vivian, and their delinquent son, Troy. While gold panning in a creek near the house, Tommy finds the summoning stone. When Troy accidentally burns the stone with a lit cigarette, bringing forth Krampus. The creature runs amok, murdering a pair of Bigfoot hunters, as well as the boyfriend of a woman named Bonnie who lives nearby. Bonnie seeks aid from the Hendersons and uses their telephone to call 911.

As they wait for the police to arrive, Will, Dale, Alice and Amber are all slaughtered by Krampus. David, Vivian, Fiona, Troy, Tommy and Bonnie try to flee in a car, but it crashes, killing Vivian. David attacks Krampus to buy the others time to run away and is ripped to pieces. Bonnie, Fiona, Troy and Tommy make it to Cooper's trail who has spent his life studying Krampus ever since he survived it all those years ago. Cooper reveals that Krampus is summoned by fire, but can be banished back to Hell by earth.

Cooper, Bonnie, Fiona, Troy and Tommy lure Krampus into an abandoned mine shaft with the summoning stone, and Cooper sacrifices himself to collapse the cavern on Krampus with TNT while the others escape. In the morning, Bonnie, Tommy and Fiona and are found by Bonnie's ex-boyfriend, a state trooper named Dan. Troy, who had become separated from the others, is mauled by a baby Krampus that had hatched from the summoning stone.

== Cast ==
- Amelia Brantley as Bonnie Tyler
- Bryson Holl as Tommy
- Caroline Lassetter as Fiona
- Taylor Buckley as Troy Henderson
- Tim Sauer as Will
- Emily Lynne Aiken as Amber
- Daniel Link as David Henderson
- Tori Osborn as Vivian Henderson
- Michael Harrelson as Dale Henderson
- Linda Cushma as Alice Henderson
- Travis Amery as Krampus
- Dujhan Brown as Trooper Dan Shilling
- Juliet Rose Serrato as Fran
- Jeffrey Aguilar Jr. as James
- Eric Lettman as Rodger
- Owen Conway as Terry
- Kerry Keepers as Cooper
- William Connor as Harvey
- Sean Dillingham as Clayton Olson
- Greg Lutz as Fritz
- Adam Berardi as Ben Rawlings
- David Casillas as Larry Light Foot
- William Kenny as Young Cooper

== Release ==
Krampus Unleashed premiered on video on demand on November 1, 2016 and was released on DVD by Uncork'd Entertainment on December 3, 2016. It was made available on the streaming service Hulu in December 2018.

== Reception ==
Scott Foy of Dread Central, who awarded Krampus Unleashed a score of 1½ out of a possible 5, commended the film's creature design and gore effects, but heavily criticized every other aspect of it, writing, "When your movie is only 75 minutes but feels longer because so little happens for so long, that will definitely get you on my naughty list." While fellow Dread Central reviewer Ted Hentschke was slightly more lenient towards the film, giving it a grade of 2/5, he still derided it as being "uninteresting" and "bland" and concluded, "It wasn't good enough to want to love, and wasn't shit enough to make me hate it." Chris Coffel of Film School Rejects wrote, "This is the second Krampus movie on this list from director Robert Conway (Krampus: The Reckoning). You would think if one director was going to make two different Krampus movies that Krampus would have the same mythos, but that is not the case. This film does offer up some practical effects with the creature which makes it far better than Conway's previous film. It's still not good at all, but I'll take the slight improvement as a step in the right direction." Nolen Boe of Horror News opined that the film's gore effects were its only positive quality, and dismissively stated, "Krampus Unleashed was not entertaining, in any way worth my money as a consumer." A score of 3/10 was awarded to the film by Starburst's Scott Clark, who wrote, "Sure it's better than Conway's first Krampus flick, but that's not saying much. The dialogue feels clunky and overdone, the acting is passable yet never involving, and worst perhaps is that its plain old dull" before concluding, "There's potential here for a good horror comedy (rednecks mistake Krampus prints for Bigfoot) but Conway takes things too seriously and spends too much time acquainting us with Krampus fodder families. Krampus: Unleashed feels most comfortable when its offing terrible people with terrible violence, we just wish it did that more."

== See also ==
- List of Christmas films
- Krampus: The Reckoning, another Krampus film directed by Robert Conway
