= Necromentia =

2009 film by Pearry Teo

- Teaser poster
- Directed by: Pearry Reginald Teo
- Written by: Pearry Reginald Teo; Stephanie Joyce
- Starring: Layton Matthews; Chad Grimes; Santiago Craig; Zelieann Rivera; Zach Cumer
- Cinematography: Darin Meyer
- Edited by: Damian Drago
- Music by: Timothy Andrew Edwards
- Distributed by: Image Entertainment (US)
- Release date: October 18, 2009 (Screamfest Horror Film Festival)
- Running time: 82 mins
- Country: United States
- Language: English

Necromentia is a 2009 horror film directed by Pearry Reginald Teo. The screenplay concerns three men who have their lives turned over by the existence of a tattooed Ouija Board, which opens the gateways to other dimensions. Hagen keeps the corpse of his lover in his house, hoping that one day she will come back from the dead as promised. When he meets a man named Travis, he learns that maybe he could venture into hell and bring her back from the dead himself.

== Plot ==
Travis cares for his mentally disabled younger brother and works as a torturer for hire. He is also addicted to heroin; it is ketamine, however, that catapults him into the realm of a black-eyed demon called Morbius. Morbius informs Travis that his brother has been taken by another demonic troublemaker called Mister Skinny. Mister Skinny appears as a diaper-wearing fat caucasian butcher in a pig mask who first entices the boy to eviscerate his slumbering baby-sitter. If Travis helps Morbius exact vengeance then Morbius will allegedly help Travis find his dead brother.

Morbius instructs Travis to find a man called Hagen and extract an agreement to use him as a gateway to Hell. Travis does this by assuring the desperate Hagen that the process will allow Hagen to enter the next realm and possibly retrieve the soul of his decomposing lover whom he has been attempting to revive. Travis proceeds to carve demonic symbols into Hagen's back and sends him straight into Hell, where he is gruesomely mutilated by a monstrous eyeless beast before ever setting out in search of his lover. Travis follows in search of his own brother and is disabled and dragged into the darkness by the hideous beast.

Morbius is then shown as being the beast and being controlled by another entity who looks like a gray-skinned adult man in a gas mask. It is then discovered that Morbius was a mute who worked as a bartender and dabbled in the occult. Morbius' girlfriend Elizabeth ultimately grew bored with her relationship, working with her lover Hagen to poison Morbius. When Morbius fails to expire on schedule, however, Hagen inadvertently becomes a murderer by killing the mute with a folding chair after Morbius manages to choke the life out of his treacherous girlfriend. Morbius abruptly finds himself in Hell and facing the gas-masked entity, who reveals himself to be a visage of Elizabeth's unborn son. Morbius pleads for revenge and the entity agrees on the condition that Morbius will then belong to the entity, as the act of revenge will ensure that Morbius will be lost to the darkness forever. Morbius agrees, then collapses to the floor, where he slowly is shown becoming his demonic form, with paper white skin and hair, and solid black eyes. He then continues to transform further until eventual becoming the large mutilated demon, who was seen exacting its revenge against Hagen, and dragging Travis away.

== Cast ==
- Layton Matthews as Morbius
- Chad Grimes as Travis
- Santiago Craig as Hagen
- Zelieann Rivera as Elizabeth
- Zach Cumer as Thomas
- Nathan Ginn as Mr. Skinny
