= Robert Conway (director) =

American independent filmmaker

- Born: August 10, 1979 (age 46); Philadelphia, Pennsylvania, U.S.
- Occupations: Director, Writer, Editor and Producer
- Years active: 2004–present

Robert Conway is an American independent filmmaker. He is best known for his work on the horror thriller films The Encounter, Krampus Unleashed, Krampus: The Reckoning, Krampus Origins, and The Covenant.

== Life and career ==
Robert was born in Philadelphia, Pennsylvania. His directorial debut feature film Redemption, in 2009. He is also slated to direct the upcoming feature films Eminence Hill and Rhea.

== Filmography ==
Year	Title	Director	Writer	Editor	Producer	notes
2004	Lynch	Yes	Yes	Yes	Yes	Short Film
2009	Redemption	Yes	Yes	Yes	Yes	Feature Film
2010	Necro Wars	Yes	Yes		Yes	Short Film
2013	Exit to Hell	Yes	Yes	Yes	Yes	Feature Film
2015	The Encounter	Yes	Yes	Yes	Yes	Feature Film
2015	Krampus: The Reckoning	Yes	Yes	Yes	Yes	Feature Film
2016	Krampus Unleashed	Yes	Yes	Yes	Yes	Feature Film
2017	The Covenant	Yes	Yes	Yes	Yes	Feature Film
2018	Krampus Origins	Yes	Yes	Yes	Yes	Feature Film
2019	Eminence Hill	Yes	Yes		Yes	
2019	Rhea	Yes	Yes		Yes	Post-production
2021	Skinwalker	Yes	Yes		Yes	
