= Hate Crime (2012 film) =

2012 found footage horror film

- Promotional release poster
- Directed by: James Cullen Bressack
- Written by: James Cullen Bressack; Jarret Cohen
- Produced by: James Cullen Bressack; Jarret Cohen
- Starring: Jody Barton; Nicholas Clark; Greg Depetro; Debbie Diesel; Tim Moran; Ian Roberts; Sloane Morgan Siegel; Maggie Wagner
- Cinematography: James Cullen Bressack
- Edited by: James Cullen Bressack
- Production company: Psykik Junky Pictures
- Distributed by: Unearthed Films
- Release dates: October 19, 2012 (Pollygrind); October 15, 2013 (United States)
- Running time: 71 minutes
- Country: United States
- Language: English

Hate Crime is a 2012 American found footage horror film directed by James Cullen Bressack, who also co-wrote, produced, shot, and edited the film. The story follows a Jewish family whose home is broken into and terrorized by violent neo-Nazis. It premiered at the 2012 Pollygrind Film Festival, before releasing on DVD on October 15, 2013.

== Plot ==
A group of crystal meth-crazed neo-Nazis invade a Jewish family's home and subject them to beating, rape, torture, incest and murder.

== Cast ==
- Jody Barton as John Buckly Jr./One
- Nicholas Clark as Tyler
- Greg Depetro as Dan
- Debbie Diesel as Lindsey
- Tim Moran as Thomas Middle/Two
- Ian Roberts as Bill Buckly/Three
- Sloane Morgan Siegel as Alex
- Maggie Wagner as Melissa

== Release ==
Hate Crime premiered at the Pollygrind Film Festival on October 19, 2012. It received the Best Transgression Film and Most Horrifying awards at Pollygrind. After appearing at numerous other films festivals, it was released on DVD in the United States by Unearthed Films on October 15, 2013.

== Ban in the United Kingdom ==
In March 2015 the British Board of Film Classification (BBFC) refused to issue a certificate to the film for a video-on-demand release, stating:

It is the Board's carefully considered conclusion that the unremitting manner in which [the film] focuses on physical and sexual abuse, aggravated by racist invective, means that to issue a classification to this work, even if confined to adults, would be inconsistent with the Board's Guidelines, would risk potential harm, and would be unacceptable to broad public opinion.

James Cullen Bressack commented that he was "honoured to know that [his] mind is officially too twisted for the UK." Though some reacted positively to the ban, Bressack stated:

As a Jewish man, and a victim of anti-Semitic hate, I made a horror film that depicts the very thing that haunts my dreams. As an artist I wanted to tell a story to remind us that we live in a dangerous world; a world where racial violence is on the rise. It saddens me to learn that censorship is still alive and well.

== See also ==
- List of films banned in the United Kingdom
