= Captain Simian & the Space Monkeys =

American animated television series

- Created by: Gordon Bressack
- Developed by: Gordon Bressack; Rob Hudnut; Gary Hartle
- Voices of: Jerry Doyle; Karen Maruyama; Maurice LaMarche; Dom Irrera; James Avery; Jeff Bennett; Michael Dorn; Malcolm McDowell; Frank Welker
- Composers: Thomas Chase Jones; Steve Rucker; Dale Schacker
- Country of origin: United States
- Original language: English
- No. of episodes: 26

Production
- Running time: 21 minutes
- Production companies: Hallmark Entertainment; Monkeyshine Productions, Inc.

Original release
- Network: Syndication (Amazin' Adventures)
- Release: August 16, 1996 – June 21, 1997

Captain Simian & the Space Monkeys is an American science fiction comedy animated television series. The show premiered in August 16, 1996 in the United Kingdom and September 7, 1996, in the United States, and ended after 26 episodes on June 21, 1997. It was produced by Hallmark Entertainment, Monkeyshine Productions, Inc., and distributed by Bohbot Entertainment and aired as part of the company's Amazin' Adventures syndicated animation block, later known as the Bohbot Kids Network.

The series is currently available on Tubi in select countries as of October 2025.

== Summary ==
During the monkey-manned spaceflights of the 1960s, one rocket veered off course, sending a chimp named Charles off into the outer reaches of space. After many years, Charles' craft was discovered by the most intelligent race in the universe; a running gag involves them being so advanced their name is unpronounceable, the characters mistake references to them as empty pauses.

Charles was given enhanced intelligence, weapons, and futuristic technology, along with a charge to protect the universe from the evil Lord Nebula. One of the more unusual villains in cartoon history, Nebula was a half-human, half-black hole who hoped to become a complete black hole, swallow the universe in a "Big Crunch", then remake it in his own image. His one problem was that, being half human, he was still susceptible to human ailments, such as the common cold and stomach aches.

To aid Charles (who was given the title "Captain Charles Simian"), The " " allowed him to recruit a team of fellow Earth monkeys and apes: Shao Lin, a Chinese golden monkey with swift fighting skills and serene wisdom; Spydor, a wisecracking little spider monkey with a long prehensile tail; Dr. Splitz/Splitzy, an orangutan with a scientist/madman split-personality; and Gor-illa/Gor, a big, strong gorilla.

The group cruises the stars in their ship, the Primate Avenger, battling Nebula and his cyborg monkey henchman, Rhesus 2, and searching for the ever-elusive bananas.

== Characters ==
=== Heroes ===
- Captain Charles "Chuck" Simian (voiced by Jerry Doyle): Originally a chimpanzee named Charles, sent into space in the 1960s by NASA. After drifting off course and being frozen for many years, he was discovered by The " ". They believed he was sent by Earth as the most advanced species of the planet. When they realized he was not, they used a machine to give Charles sentience. After being told about Nebula, Captain Simian (as he now called himself) recruited a team of primates to help him save the universe.
- Spydor (voiced by Dom Irrera): A wisecracking spider monkey, originally the property of an organ grinder from New York City. A pickpocket, grifter, and all-around thief, he often tries to take advantage of Gor by trying to get him to do his work and trying numerous get-rich-quick schemes which get him into trouble with the Captain. Despite these flaws, Spydor is loyal to the mission, and will never betray his friends or the universe for money. He is especially close to Gor, and will not let anyone else take advantage of him. Spydor is in charge of communications.
- Shao Lin (voiced by Karen Maruyama): A golden snub-nosed monkey who originally lived at a Buddhist temple, where she was worshiped as a goddess. She continues to act as a goddess with the rest of the crew, even addressing herself in the Royal "we". This leads to considerable tension at first, though over time she warms to the others and vice versa. Skilled in martial arts and knowledgeable in Buddhist wisdom, she is Captain Simian's first officer.
- Gor (voiced by James L. Avery Sr.): A gorilla originally from Rwanda as a dominant male and the crew's muscle. During the evolution process, he accidentally wrecked the intelligence-enhancing machine before its completion. This left Gor rather naive and childlike. Possessing extraordinary strength, Gor is naturally quite peaceful and does not wish to do anyone harm. But when his friends are in danger he can go into a berserk rage. Gor is later experimented on by Apax, turning him into a gigantic, mindless form called Gormongous. Dr. Splitz is unable to reverse the effect of Apax's isotope, meaning that Gor turns into Gormongous when sufficiently angered.
- Dr. Splitz/Splitzy (voiced by Maurice LaMarche): A former zoo orangutan with a dual personality that alternates between an effete academic ("Dr. Splitz") and a rustic yokel ("Splitzy"). Splitz excels at scientific theory and is somewhat cowardly, while Splitzy is a mechanic and engineer eager to jump into a fight. The two personalities are aware of each other and bicker constantly, but often rely on each other to make up for their individual shortcomings.
- Orbitron (voiced by Jeff Bennett): A spherical robot given to Charles by The " " to help him on his mission. Its role was to provide the monkeys with the additional knowledge they required for their journey. Orbitron was accidentally damaged by Gor, causing it to sputter nonsense that only occasionally makes sense.

=== Villains ===
- Lord Nebula (voiced by Michael Dorn): Nebula is a humanoid with the power of a black hole who intends to become a complete black hole, swallow the universe in a "Big Crunch", then remake it in his image.
- Rhesus 2 (voiced by Malcolm McDowell): An enforcer of Lord Nebula. Originally a rhesus monkey sent into space, Nebula made him intelligent and turned him into a cyborg. His brain is detachable and frequently changes from one to another in order to get different ideas.
- Apax (voiced by Frank Welker): An alien with green skin and snakes in place of hair. Apax forces other alien creatures to fight in an arena.
- Kaz-Par (voiced by Maurice LaMarche): An owner of a club on Maltese 1, who simply planned to steal the Primate Avenger, but had to go under the identity of Gor when someone else replaced him to steal the Orbitron and sell it to Nebula.

=== Other ===
- Matrix (voiced by Maurice LaMarche): A computer who captures the Monkeys and learns from them to eventually evolve into a living being.
- Vog: Vog is a two-dimensional alien. When Rhesus 2 steals gravitons from a cosmic storm, Vog's world rips open, so he follows Charles to his universe and asks his help to put the gravitons back before the cosmic storm ends to seal the rip and save his universe.
- Holo Boons (voiced by Jeff Bennett and Maurice LaMarche): Holographic baboons created by Dr. Splitz to test the conditions of unknown planets. They are a parody of the redshirts from the original Star Trek series, and almost always get destroyed.
- Grixilpix (voiced by Oliver Muirhead): The keeper of the Great Ear. This ear is that of the Sleeping Giant, whom Grxilpix tells the monkeys is dreaming about the whole universe. Anything that someone asks for to the ear appears.
- Largo Trix (voiced by Jeff Bennett): A swashbuckling space adventurer who meets the crew in a bar. He possesses the ability to duplicate the characteristics and traits of others via physical contact. After spending time with the Space Monkeys, Largo gradually turns into a monkey-like form.
- The " " (voiced by Oliver Muirhead): An advanced alien race that is so advanced, the name of their species cannot be spoken or written, only thought. They intercepted Captain Simian while he was still a wild chimpanzee. Believed to be a human broken free of his evolutionary bonds, they gave Simian advanced intelligence and the power of speech. They assigned Simian to stop Nebula before he gets the anti-force and completes his dark goal which is to destroy and recreate the universe.
- Mandrax (voiced by David Carradine): A mandrill who is able to levitate, become intangible, and mentally connect with others. He speaks in ominous and cryptical phrases and seems to know everyone in the crew better than they know themselves. At the end of the series, Mandrax is revealed to be a future version of Captain Simian.

== Episodes ==
No.	Title	Directed by	Written by	Original release date	Prod. code
1	"Yes, We Have No Bananas, Part 1"	Bradley Rader	Gordon Bressack and Rob Hudnut	September 7, 1996	1
During the monkey-manned spaceflights, one of the rockets, with a chimp named Charles, went off course and into the far reaches of the universe. An advanced race of aliens enhanced Charles' intelligence and gives him a monkey and ape crew and a ship and names him Captain Charles Simian. Their mission is to defeat an alien named Nebula, who plans on taking over the universe with a matter called the "Anti-Force".
2	"Yes, We Still Have No Bananas, Part 2"	Bradley Rader	Gordon Bressack and Rob Hudnut	September 7, 1996	2
Charles is determined to destroy the Anti-force that Nebula needs by casting it into the nearest Sun. Unable to make it he instead puts it inside a disco ball and rigs it to blow. When Nebula absorbs the ball, it absorbs all of Nebula's energy and he turns back into his original self and then blows up. Charles then names the ship the Primate Avenger.
3	"Ape-lien"	Bradley Rader	Pamela Hickey and Dennys McCoy	September 14, 1996	3
The crew answers a distress call from the NC-17 galaxy, where they find a derelict ship and split up to search it. Spydor recovers an egg from the ship, which rapidly grows and Splitzy says that the alien's DNA is changing rapidly, allowing it to change shape quickly; as Gor fights the alien, it absorbs his DNA, reconstructing itself and becoming stronger. Splitzy uses Spydor's crystals to create a cage to trap the alien; Spydor lures the alien into the cage, and the primates dump it into space.
4	"The Monkey Has Landed"	David Schwartz	Mark Seidenberg and Gordon Bressack	September 14, 1996	4
The ship is warped to a planet in another galaxy, where they are attacked by unmanned planes. After blowing up the planes, they search the planet further, finding that it looks like Earth but is covered entirely with jungle, and meet an intelligent monkey named Lilith. Lilith identifies herself as the caretaker of the planet and tells them that an alien race recently visited the planet and gave its residents increased intelligence. They all left to explore space, leaving her behind as the chosen caretaker. Rhesus 2 attacks Captain Simian and explains that the planet is not Earth, but his former homeworld Terrestria. Long ago, its human scientists sent him into space, but his pod escaped orbit and was beamed on board by Lord Nebula, who made him intelligent. Lilith is revealed to be a robot and is destroyed by Rhesus. However, Splitzy repairs Lilith, allowing her to return to her caretaker role.
5	"Gorilla My Dreams"	Bradley Rader	Martin Olson and Gordon Bressack	September 21, 1996	5
Nebula tells Rhesus 2 to go to a planet named Medusa 4, where he will find a device to produce the anti-force. Captain Simian intercepts the message and quickly travels to Medusa. Spydor falls down a trench and the rest follow after him. They land in a chamber, where they meet an alien named Grxylpk. Grxylpk takes them to a wall shaped like an ear, which may be the ear of a sleeping giant. Grxylpk says that the sacred ear keeps the galaxy running and can make anything them through the power of dreams. Rhesus attacks the group, with both sides using the ear to upgrade their weaponry. The giant wakes up during the battle, causing the galaxy to begin disappearing. Splitzy creates a huge sound wave which sounds like a lullaby, putting the giant back to sleep.
6	"Splitzy's Choice"	Bradley Rader	Pamela Hickey and Dennys McCoy	September 21, 1996	7
Splitzy uses a device he created to get rid of his split personality, splitting him and Dr. Splitz into separate bodies. A sand monster destroys the Holo Boon, and goes after Simian and Shao Lin, but is shot and retreats. When they see that the ship is coming apart, Splitzy and Splitz work together to fix the ship and realize that they need each other. Dr. Splitz and Splitzy use their machine to merge back into one monkey.
7	"Repo Ape"	Bradley Rader	Pamela Hickey and Dennys McCoy	October 5, 1996	9
Splitzy finds that Charles' capsule was not destroyed with the planet and made its way to the XJ-12 galaxy. So the crew get ready to go there. When they get into the galaxy, their ship is caught in a magnetic anomaly and crashes in a junkyard. The monkeys encounter Matrix, a robot who captures them to "deconstruct and assimilate". Gor gets free and then frees everyone else, but is recaptured along with Gor. On the ship, the monkeys learn that Matrix was once an automated salvage vehicle who deconstructed and assimilated abandoned space vehicles. Stranded after being caught in the anomaly, Matrix continued its job, but was unable to distinguish between machine and Monkeys. Splitzy creates a magnetic field to cancel the anomaly, and the robots overload. Then the crew makes it back to the ship and they flee. Splitzy tells the Monkeys that Matrix survived and continues to evolve, but it will take 20 centuries to complete.
8	"Gormongus!"	David Schwartz	Nick Sagan	November 2, 1996	6
Gor and Spydor are captured by an unknown ship and encounter Apex, an alien with snakes for hair. Apax tells Gor that he's going to make him a champion, and takes Gor and Spydor to an arena. Gor is forced to fight, or else he will be killed. Apax injects Gor with a special isotope that causes him to transform into a large, monstrous state. Spydor sings Gor a lullaby, which causes him to go to sleep and changes back to normal. Splitzy later does tests on Gor and determines that the isotope's effects are irreversible.
9	"Invasion of the Banana Snatchers"	David Schwartz	Gordon Bressack and Beth Slick	November 9, 1996	8
The crew finds giant alien bananas attached to the hull of the ship. The bananas capture Gor, Spydor, and Splitzy and creates clones of them. The clones take over the ship, forcing Shao Lin and Captain Simian to escape. In the end Shao Lin and Simian go to the space station that the bananas came from and free their crew from them. When the crew is freed, their clones evaporate.
10	"Lawnmower Ape"	David Schwartz	Alan Swayze and Gordon Bressack	November 16, 1996	10
Gor has been having a hard time keeping up with the rest of the crew. Splitzy uses the cerebrotron to increase Gor's intelligence, causing him to become smarter than Splitzy. Rhesus 2 attacks the ship to get Gor's brain because Gor is now smart and knows how to create anti-force. Spydor tries to make Gor transform into Gormongous so that he can defeat Rhesus, but Gor has gotten too smart to get angry. Gor uses Splitzy's cerebrotron to decrease his intelligence back to how he was before. Gor successfully transforms and defeats Rhesus.
11	"Monkey in the Middle"	Bradley Rader	Story by : Gordon Bressack; Teleplay by : Marlowe Weisman and Laraine Arkow	November 23, 1996	11
Rhesus 2 steals gravitons from a cosmic storm, which causes a rip in the universe and Charles goes in it and when he comes back an alien follows him. The alien then tells Charles that his name is Vog and when the gravitons were stolen his world ripped open and says he must put the gravitons back before the cosmic storm ends to seal the rip and save his universe. With the aliens' help, the crew gets the gravitons back and saves the universe.
12	"Plan Ape from Outer Space"	Bradley Rader	Lynn Mills, Jimmy Huston & Gordon Bressack	November 30, 1996	13
To escape from a space creature and nearly out of fuel, the Space Monkeys ride a meteor through a wormhole. On the other side, they discover an inhabited planet and decide to refuel there. However, they also discover that the meteor is about to hit the planet. They try to warn the inhabitants, but the universal translator is broken and the inhabitants think they have been invaded. Despite repeated attempts to communicate, they cannot convince the inhabitants of their peaceful intentions. So, to save the planet pretend to invade and lure all of the missiles coming from the planet, towards the meteor. After the meteor is destroyed, the inhabitants think they have destroyed the ship and averted an alien invasion.
13	"Monkey Puzzle Man"	Joe Pearson	Pamela Hickey and Dennys McCoy	January 25, 1997	15
The crew encounter a smooth-talking spacefarer called Largo Thrix, who becomes more monkey-like the longer he hangs out with them. Everyone assumes Simian's bad feeling about him is just jealousy, but it ultimately turns out Largo can duplicate the characteristics of other beings and is in cahoots with Rhesus 2. After he helps Rhesus capture the Space Monkeys, his conscience is reawoken by Simian deliberately 'infecting' him with some of his own persona and he helps them escape.
14	"The Apes of Wrath"	David Schwartz	Richard Mueller and Gordon Bressack	February 1, 1997	12
Rhesus 2 destroys the Holo Boon generator to force the crew to Velasquez 9 for a replacement. Unbeknownst to them, he has modified the replacement to generate a megalomaniacal dictator whose "Holo Boon horde" seizes the ship.
15	"Mind Over Monkey"	Joe Pearson	Martin Olson and Gordon Bressack	February 8, 1997	14
Rhesus 2 plants a Psycho Neutron Annihilator which will destroy all organic life on the Primate Avenger but leave the ship intact. To prevent the crew from locating it before it blows up, the bomb creates several realistic and dangerous hallucinations of their greatest fears which they must pass through in order to get closer.
16	"Planet of the Humans"	Bradley Rader	D.C. Fontana	February 15, 1997	16
The crew lands on an alien planet populated entirely by barbaric humans as well as two alien brothers who had been abandoned on the planet for three years as a test to enter adulthood. While one brother wandered alone the other allied himself with the human population who "knew how to survive". Unable to leave, the crew is captured by the human tribe which confirms many of their preconceived notions about humanity. Although Shao Lin was worshiped by humans on Earth and Simian claimed to have a good "working relationship" with them, Gor, Splitzy and Spydor had all been abused by various humans and Gor, who had been hunted by poachers back on Earth, especially disliked them. However, when Gor frightens a young human girl he finds her to be innocent and that humans are capable of change. When the brothers' father finally returns for his sons the crew rethinks what it means to be "evolved".
17	"Little House on the Primate"	Bradley Rader	Laraine Arkow and Marlowe Weisman	February 22, 1997	18
When Spydor demands that the crew land on an uninhabited natural world for some recreation, his plans to officially claim the planet and colonize it for his own benefit are ironically mimicked by a tiny spaceship full of flea-sized aliens, who attempt to colonize Spydor's body. Since their moral codes prohibit them from simply destroying the diminutive aliens, the rest of the crew use one of Dr. Splitz's inventions to shrink down small enough to attempt diplomacy. However, Rhesus 2 attacks the Primate Avenger and captures Spydor whilst the crew are shrunken, forcing the Space Monkeys and the aliens to work together. In the end the crew leaves and the aliens seek out the body of Rhesus.
18	"Felonious Monks"	David Schwartz	Christy Marx	March 1, 1997	17
Primate Avenger's crew is kidnapped by Apax, and only one Space Monkey can now free them all: Shao Lin (with Orbitron's "help").
19	"The Maltese Monkey"	David Schwartz	Pamela Hickey, Dennys McCoy & Gordon Bressack	April 19, 1997	19
In a parody of Noir films, Captain Simian and the Space Monkeys must navigate the treacherous twists and turns of the denizens of Maltese 1 in order to recover the stolen Orbitron, which has revealed it contains the formula for GLOPP, before a local crimeboss can sell it to Lord Nebula.
20	"Escape From the Plant of the Apes"	Bradley Rader	Laraine Arkow and Marlowe Weisman	April 26, 1997	21
The Primate Avenger comes across a spacecraft containing a huge forest of trees and plants. The roots of the trees suddenly come to life and drag the Avenger on board. The forest is dying and requires a gardener to maintain it. The nature-loving Gor would be ideal for the post and when his companions try to interfere their lives are put in jeopardy. To add to their problems, Splitzy unintentionally switches the minds of Simian and Shao Lin.
21	"Rhesus Pieces"	John Fox	Gordon Bressack and D.C. Fontana	May 3, 1997	20
A powerful being calling himself the Glyph offers Simian the chance of destroying Nebula. The plan is to lure Rhesus 2 into a trap and get him to lead them to his master. But the crew soon discovers that their new ally has an agenda of his own.
22	"A Clockwork Orang"	David Schwartz	Gordon Bressack and Rob Hudnut	May 10, 1997	22
While the crew argues about whether or not they should try to return to Earth when the universe is still in jeopardy, Gor wishes he had a friend to share his interests. Splitzy has created a small android orangutan as an experiment and decides to use Gor's simple mind as a basis for its thought patterns. Gor names it Isaac and the Captain thinks an android crew might be the ideal solution to allow the Primate crew to go home. They travel to Cyber 1, an android planet, for parts. When they arrive, they find the planet is ruled by Matrix, who refuses to let them leave. When they find the power grid for the planet, Issac decides to stay behind as he is the only one who can shut down the power grid. He declares that he is an android and belongs there, and says goodbye to Gor. Later, Isaac is shown growing a flower and sharing it with the other androids.
23	"Surf Monkeys Must Dive!"	Bradley Rader	Laraine Arkow and Marlowe Weisman	May 17, 1997	23
When the Primate Avenger's scanners register that an occupied oceanic planet is undergoing critical core destabilization, the Space Monkeys attempt to land to warn the inhabitants, only to be attacked by the militaristic society and shot down. The planet's ocean is made of hyper-liquidized oxygen, and thus breathable. Determined to continue their mission, the Space Monkeys discover the planet's inhabitants are divided into two subspecies; the surface-dwellers who attacked them, and another culture that lives entirely under the ocean and has been enslaved by the surface dwellers. Their rampant mining has destabilized the planet, and unless a substantial portion of metal is returned soon, its core will break through to the surface. With the planet on the verge of exploding, the Space Monkeys convince the species to work together to stabilize the core, creating the first natural landmasses on the planet. As the Space Monkeys leave, the representatives of the former factions argue over how to integrate their people together and how to share the land and water.
24	"The Mandrill Who Knew Too Much, Part 1"	John Fox and Joe Pearson	Gordon Bressack	June 7, 1997	24
Lord Nebula finally creates an almost complete GLOPP generator, and deduces that the one thing he needs to complete it is the Orbitron. He dispatches Rhesus 2 to retrieve Orbitron. Meanwhile, the Space Monkeys encounter a mysterious mandrill named Mandrax, who speaks ominously of things to come.
25	"Ape-pocalypse Now!, Part 2"	David Schwartz and Joe Pearson	Gordon Bressack	June 14, 1997	25
Rhesus 2 attacks the Primate Avenger with incredible ferocity, and ultimately manages to capture all of the Space Monkeys except for Captain Simian. Realizing that Rhesus's goal is to retrieve Orbitron for Nebula, Captain Simian makes the hardest decision of his career and is forced to retreat, leaving his crews in Rhesus's clutches. He lands on a barren wasteland planet... but in his eyes, it's a paradisaical jungle world, where a willing and affectionate Shao Lin awaits him.
26	"Ape-pocalypse... A Little Later!, Part 3"	Bradley Rader	Gordon Bressack	June 21, 1997	26
The Space Monkeys languish aboard Nebula's ships, awaiting interrogation at the hands of Rhesus 2. Captain Simian is still wandering a desolate planet, believing himself to be in paradise, until he is attacked by imaginary monsters. Mandrax appears and dispels the illusion, which was created by a pair of psychic aliens. After some conversation with Mandrax, Captain Simian returns to Lord Nebula's ship to rescue his crew, trading Orbitron for their safety. The GLOPP generator goes haywire, transforming Nebula into a tiny round sphere and disabling his powers. Rhesus realizes that he no longer needs to obey Nebula in his diminished state and throws the GLOPP generator into space before declaring his intent to conquer the universe. The Space Monkeys vow to continue fighting until Rhesus is defeated, and Mandrax watches as they fly away, before revealing himself to be a time-traveling Captain Simian from the future.

== Production and personnel ==
Epoch and Toon-Us-In provided all pre-production in L.A., including layout. Animation, ink and paint and camera was provided by Seoul-based studios Sunmin Image Pictures and Jireh Animation. Vitello Productions provided post-production services. The series was produced by Joe Pearson, with Rob Hudnut, Gordon Bressack, and Gary Hartle serving as executive producers.

== Merchandise figures ==
In 1996, Mattel released a collection of action figures based on Captain Simian & the Space Monkeys. Designed by Bluebird Toys of the UK, the line included nine basic figures and four large vehicles or accessories. The figures, armed with several accessories, were packaged so that the consumer could rotate them inside the card bubble as though they were floating in space.
