= Poochie (toy) =

1980s toy by Mattel

Poochie was a popular Mattel toy in the 1980s, a white poodle with pink ears and paws that wore a pair of purple sunglasses. An animated special featuring the character was produced by DIC Audiovisuel in 1984.
