= Gordon Bressack =

American television writer (1951–2019)

- Born: 28 May 1951; New York City, New York, US
- Died: 30 August 2019 (aged 68); Los Angeles, California, US
- Occupation: Screenwriter
- Spouse: Ellen Gerstell
- Children: James Cullen Bressack
- Writing career
- Language: English
- Notable works: Pinky and the Brain, Animaniacs

Gordon Joseph Bressack (May 28, 1951 – August 30, 2019) was an American television writer who won Emmy Awards for Pinky and the Brain and Animaniacs. He was the father of filmmaker James Cullen Bressack.

== Television credits ==
Series head writer denoted in bold.

- The 13 Ghosts of Scooby-Doo (1985)
- Yogi's Treasure Hunt (1986)
- Pound Puppies (1986)
- **Bionic Six** (1987)
- The Adventures of Raggedy Ann and Andy (1988)
- DuckTales (1989)
- The Smurfs (1989)
- New Kids on the Block (1990)
- The Real Ghostbusters (1990)
- The Wizard of Oz (1990)
- Tiny Toon Adventures (1990)
- Teenage Mutant Ninja Turtles (1991)
- Yo Yogi! (1991)
- Darkwing Duck (1991)
- Adventures of Sonic the Hedgehog (1993)
- **Mighty Max** (1994): season 2 head writer
- **Captain Simian & the Space Monkeys** (1996)
- Animaniacs (1997)
- Pinky and the Brain (1998)
- Fat Dog Mendoza (1998)
- Pinky, Elmyra & the Brain (1999)
- The Adventures of Jimmy Neutron, Boy Genius (2002)
- Little People (2002)
- Tutenstein (2004)
- Loonatics Unleashed (2006)
- Sushi Pack (2007)
- WordGirl (2014)
- Octonauts (2017)
