= James Cullen Bressack =

American film director

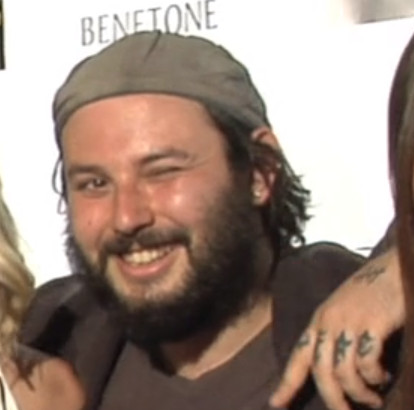
- Bressack in 2015
- Born: c. 1992 (age 33–34); Los Angeles, California, United States
- Occupations: Film director; screenwriter; film producer
- Parents: Gordon Bressack (father); Ellen Gerstell (mother)
- Website: jamescullenbressack.com

James Cullen Bressack (born c. 1992 in Los Angeles, California) is an American film producer, screenwriter and film director. He is the son of Emmy Award-winning writer Gordon Bressack and voice actress Ellen Gerstell.

Bressack directed his first feature at the age of 18 and worked chiefly in low-budget horror before moving into action films in the 2020s, directing several late-career vehicles for Bruce Willis as well as films with Jean-Claude Van Damme and Mel Gibson.

== Career ==
Bressack's first feature film, My Pure Joy, was released in 2011. His 2012 film Hate Crime, the story of a Jewish family being terrorized in their home by neo-Nazis, was banned in the UK in 2015 by the BBFC due to the "unremitting manner in which [it] focuses on physical and sexual abuse, aggravated by racist invective."

His 2013 film To Jennifer, a found footage feature, was filmed entirely using an iPhone. His 2014 horror film Pernicious was described as "The Ring meets Hostel".

In 2015, he started the Grit Film Works production company with Zack Ward, the two co-writing the films Bethany (directed by Bressack and starring Ward, Shannen Doherty and Tom Green) and Restoration (directed by Ward).

He directed the 2017 thriller Limelight. In late 2017, he was reported to be directing supernatural revenge thriller Together, and in 2018 the psychological thriller Alone.

From 2019 Bressack worked mainly in direct-to-video and limited-release action films. He directed Beyond the Law with Steven Seagal, and two 2021 films starring Bruce Willis, Survive the Game and Fortress; he directed a third Willis film, Hot Seat, released in 2022.

In 2022 he adapted his father's play Murder, Anyone? into a feature of the same name, which was acquired by Uncork'd Entertainment and released digitally in February 2023.

He directed the 2024 noir action thriller Darkness of Man, starring Jean-Claude Van Damme. His found footage revenge film The Workout premiered at Fantastic Fest and was given a limited theatrical release in August 2025 by Anchor Bay Entertainment. He also co-wrote the 2025 science-fiction action film Speed Train, directed by Ryan Francis.

== Personal life ==
Bressack is Jewish. His father, the Emmy Award-winning animation writer Gordon Bressack, died in 2019.

== Filmography ==
Films
Year	Title	Director	Writer	Producer	Cinematographer	Editor	Notes
2011	My Pure Joy	Yes	Yes	Yes	No	Yes	
2011	Theatre of the Deranged	Co-director	Co-writer	Yes	Co-cinematographer	Co-editor	segments "Andy's Theatre of Derange", "Speak Easy"
2013	13/13/13	Yes	Yes	No	No	No	
2013	Hate Crime	Yes	Co-writer	Yes	Yes	Yes	banned in the United Kingdom in 2015
2013	To Jennifer	Yes	Yes	Executive	Co-cinematographer	Yes	
2014	White Crack Bastard	Yes	No	No	No	No	
2014	Theatre of the Deranged II	Co-director	Co-writer	Yes	No	Co-editor	segment "Unmimely Demise"
2015	Pernicious	Yes	Co-writer	No	No	No	
2015	The Condo	Yes	No	Co-executive	No	No	
2016	2 Jennifer	No	Characters	Executive	No	No	
2017	Limelight	Yes	No	Executive	No	No	featuring Paul Vandervort, Sean Kanan, Jonathan Lipnicki, Jenna Jameson, Keith Coogan
2017	CarGo	Yes	Co-writer	No	No	No	
2017	Bethany	Yes	Co-writer	Yes	No	No	
2019	Beyond the Law	Yes	No	Yes	No	No	
2020	The Call	No	No	Co-producer	No	No	
2021	Survive the Game	Yes	No	No	No	No	
2021	The Fortress	Yes	No	No	No	No	
2022	Sally Floss: Digital Detective	Yes	No	Executive	No	No	featuring Vernon Wells, Tara Reid, Eric Roberts
2022	Hot Seat	Yes	No	No	No	No	
2023	Mike & Fred vs The Dead	No	No	Executive	No	No	
2023	Murder, Anyone?	Yes	Yes	No	No	No	adapted from the play by Gordon Bressack
2024	Darkness of Man	Yes	Yes	Yes	No	No	
2025	The Workout	Yes	Yes	Yes	No	No	found footage; premiered at Fantastic Fest
2025	Speed Train	No	Co-writer	No	No	No	directed by Ryan Francis

=== Short films ===
- The Pointless Adventure of Brad and Dylan (2004)
- Heroine Junky for Dummies (2005)
- Lunar Impossible (2006)
- Reflecting Love (2008)
- The Moving Chair (2008)
- CollEDGE (2008)
- The Music-Box Killer (2008)
- Unmimely Demise (2011)
- Dr. Suess's There's a Wocket in My Pocket (2012)
- Family Time (2013)
- Unicorn Zombie Apocalypse (2014)

=== Television ===
- Oh, We Review! (2010–2012, 19 episodes)
- Blood Lake: Attack of the Killer Lampreys (2014, TV movie)
