= Rude Dog =

- Art concept and design by Rick Tuthill
- First appearance: 1986
- Created by: Brad McMahon
- Voiced by: Rob Paulsen

In-universe information
- Species: Dog
- Occupation: Mechanic
- Nationality: American

Rude Dog is a fictional animated white dog originally created by artist Brad McMahon while under contract to Sun Sportswear in the 1980s as part of a line of surfing- and skateboarding-related clothing. As of 2015, Rude Dog was once again trademarked, this time in the name of original series/character creator Brad McMahon. McMahon also created Rude Dog's gang of canine misfits known as "the Dweebs", as well as Seymour, Rude Dog's nemesis.

== Adult animated series revival ==
An adult animated series adaptation of Rude Dog was announced in 2022.
