= Anna Harr =

American actress (born 2000)

- Born: April 5, 2000 (age 26); Phoenix, Arizona, U.S.
- Occupation: Actress
- Years active: 2012–present

Anna Harr is an American actress. She is known for her work on the films Stasis, Bethany and Krampus Origins.

== Life and career ==
Anna was born in Phoenix, Arizona. She has four sisters and two brothers. She is a gymnast and a dancer. In 2017, she was cast in a role as Bethany/Young Claire in the film Bethany and played both lead roles in the film Stasis, later released by Netflix. In 2022 she played the role of Kevin Dillon's daughter in the film Hot Seat, also starring Mel Gibson.

== Filmography ==
Year	Title	Role
2012	Shake It Up	Shoe Rap Dancer
2013	The Soup	Child Director
2013	A Lovely Afternoon	Kerri
2013	The Flip Side	Party host
2013	Up North	Mikey
2013	Ladykillers, Inc	Kelly Smith
2014	Chasing the Sunset	
2015	Strange Blood	Ella Moorehouse
2015	The Woman of the Mountain	Beth
2015	A Beautiful Now	Ballerina
2016	The Curse of Sleeping Beauty	Young Briar Rose
2016	Restoration	Katherine
2016	Ghosthunters	Gabby
2017	Take a Stand	Janie
2017	Bethany	Bethany / Young Claire
2017	Stasis	Ava / Seattle
2018	Eleven Eleven	Abductee Child
2018	Krampus Origins	Adelia
2019	Patsy Lee & The Keepers of the 5 Kingdoms	Squirrel
2019	Blood Craft	Young Grace
2019	Eminence Hill	Ruth
2020	The Dark Side of Opulent	Nelly Amari
2020	Battlefield 2025	Allie
2020	Meteor Moon	Private Diaz
2021	Methuselah	Lydia Sherman
2022	Hot Seat	Zoey
2022	Tales from the Other Side	Tina
2022	Shadow Master	Dewitt
2023	Love by Design	Teen Brooke
2024	Hellhounds	Brandy
2024	The Keepers of the 5 Kingdoms	Squirrel
2024	Darkness of Man	Bethany
TBA	Rhea	Rhea
